= Rod Bockenfeld =

American politician from Colorado (1955–2025)

Member of the Colorado House of Representatives from the 56th district
- In office January 4, 2019 – January 8, 2025
- Preceded by: Philip Covarrubias
- Succeeded by: Chris Richardson

Personal details
- Born: December 9, 1955 Quincy, Illinois, U.S.
- Died: February 13, 2025 (aged 69) Watkins, Colorado, U.S.
- Party: Republican
- Spouse: Susan Bockenfeld
- Education: Western Illinois University; Graduate School of Banking at Colorado
- Occupation: Banker, small business owner

Rodney Joseph Bockenfeld (December 9, 1955 – February 13, 2025) was an American politician who served as a member of the Colorado House of Representatives from the 56th district, which encompassed portions of Arapahoe and Adams counties, including the communities of Aurora, Bennett, Brick Center, Brighton, Byers, Comanche Creek, Commerce City, Deer Trail, Lochbuie, Peoria, Strasburg, Thornton, Todd Creek, and Watkins.

== Early life and education ==
Bockenfeld was born on December 9, 1955, in Quincy, Illinois. He graduated from Quincy Notre Dame High School, a private Catholic school, in 1974 before attending Western Illinois University, from which he graduated in 1978 with a Bachelor of Science in law enforcement administration. Shortly thereafter, Bockenfeld moved to Colorado and began working as a financial crimes investigator. In 1989, he received a diploma from the Graduate School of Banking at Colorado at the University of Colorado Boulder.

== Political career ==
In 2004, Bockenfeld was elected Arapahoe County Commissioner, a post he held for 12 years. He was also chairman of the Board of County Commissioners.

=== Elections ===
After defeating the incumbent Philip Covarrubias in the primaries, Bockenfeld was elected in the general election on November 6, 2018, winning 56 percent of the vote over 41 percent of Democratic candidate Dave Rose.

In the 2020 Colorado House of Representatives election, Bockenfeld defeated his Democratic Party and Libertarian Party opponents, winning 35,520 votes. Democrat Giugi Carminati won 23,790 votes and Libertarian Kevin Gulbranson won 2,531 votes.

In the 2022 Colorado House of Representatives election, he again defeated his Democratic Party and Libertarian Party opponents, winning 75.83% of the total votes cast.

Bockenfeld did not run for re-election in 2024, citing health reasons.

== Personal life and death ==
Bockenfeld lived in Watkins, Colorado, with his wife Susan. He had five children and four grandchildren. Bockenfeld died on February 13, 2025, at the age of 69.
