= Philip Covarrubias =

American politician

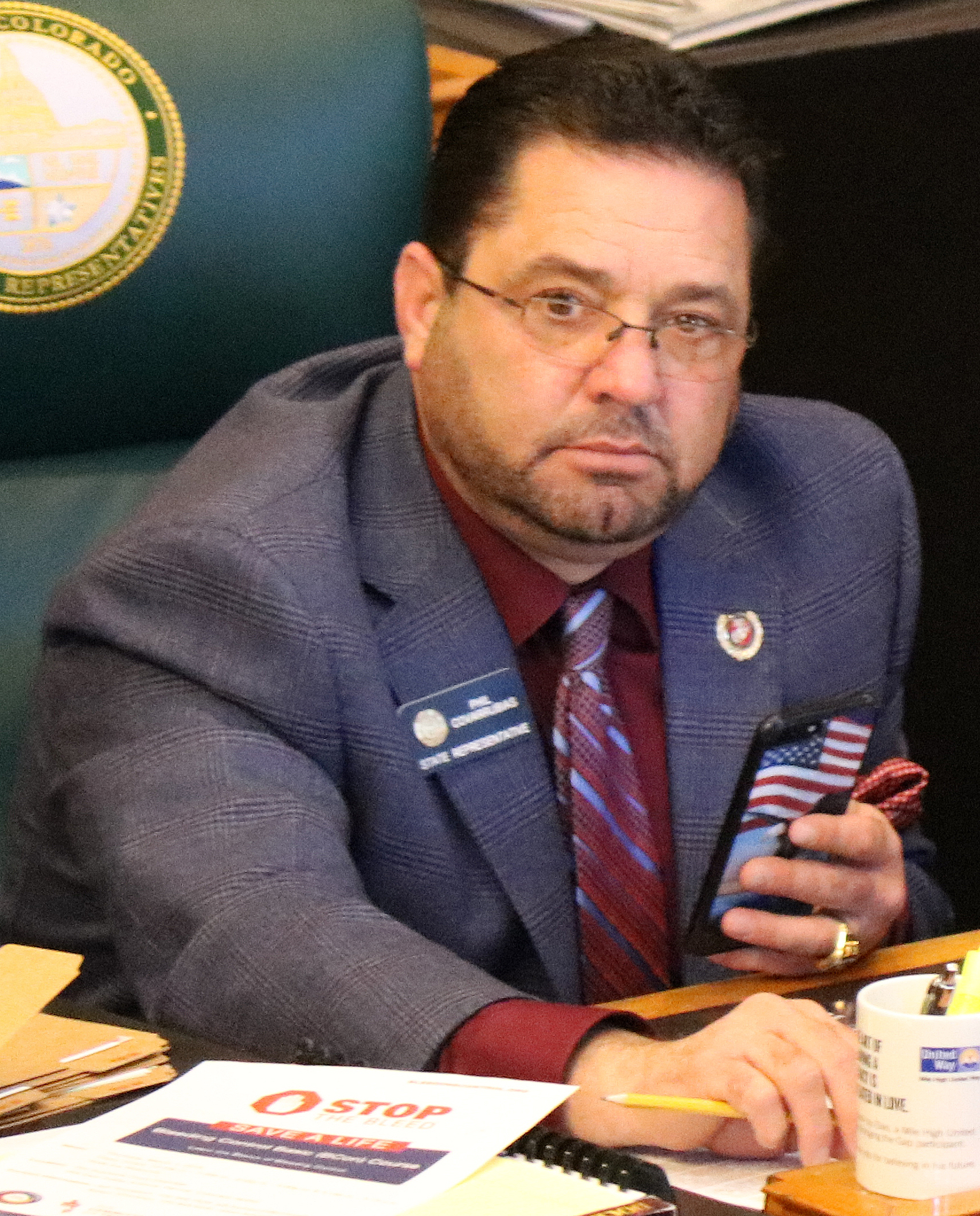
- Covarrubias in 2018.

Member of the Colorado House of Representatives from the 56th district
- In office January 11, 2017 – January 4, 2019
- Preceded by: Kevin Priola
- Succeeded by: Rod Bockenfeld

Personal details
- Party: Republican
- Spouse: Tonya
- Children: Nicholas; Erik
- Profession: Lead Foreman/Project Manager
- Website: www.philcforhd56.com

Philip Covarrubias is a Colorado politician and a former member of the Colorado House of Representatives from the 56th District, which encompasses portions of Arapahoe and Adams counties, including the communities of Aurora, Bennett, Brick Center, Brighton, Byers, Comanche Creek, Commerce City, Deer Trail, Lochbuie, Peoria, Strasburg, Thornton, Todd Creek, and Watkins. He served on the Finance and Health, Insurance, & Environment committees.

Covarrubias, a Republican, formerly lived in Brighton. He currently lives in Seabrook, Texas. He co-founded an excavation and construction company that worked on the FasTracks project connecting downtown Denver to Denver International Airport, and currently works as a foreman for Xcel Energy. He is Mexican-American and a co-founder of Hispanic Contractors of Colorado; having experienced racial discrimination while growing up, he is part of the Sociedad Protección Mutua De Trabajadores Unidos.

== Elections ==
Covarrubias was first elected to office in 2016. In the Republican primary that year, he faced no opposition. In the general election, he won the race, winning 58.60% of the vote against one Democratic and one Libertarian candidate.

In 2018, he ran for re-election but lost to Rod Bockenfeld in the Republican primary.

In 2020, he ran for the Adams County Board of Commissioners, but was defeated by former Brighton City Councilwoman Lynn Baca.

In 2022, he ran for the new Texas's 38th congressional district, having moved to Seabrook, Texas in 2021.

== Legislative positions ==
Covarrubias supported Colorado HB17-1242, putting a measure on Colorado's November 2017 ballot asking voters to approve a sales tax increase to improve transportation infrastructure.

As an opponent of HB17-1372, a bill to mandate that oil and gas companies provide the public with maps of flowlines, Covarrubias filibustered and helped defeat the bill.

== Japanese internment comments ==
In March 2017, commenting on the Japanese-American internment, Covarrubias said that in the "heat of combat", "there's no time to ask questions and find out who's a citizen and who's not." In a later interview Covarrubias said he was "sorry that [the internment] was a part of our history" and that "under no circumstances, regardless of who they are, should people be treated in the way that people were being treated during the World War II period".
