= James Fawcett (disambiguation) =

Sir James Fawcett (1913–1991) was a British barrister.

James Fawcett may also refer to:

- James Fawcett (professor) (1752–1831), Norrisian professor at Cambridge
- James Fawcett (politician), member of the Kansas House of Representatives
- James Fawcett of Fawcett and Ashworth, a British design partnership
