= Saint Mary's Glacier =

Semi-permanent snowfield in Colorado

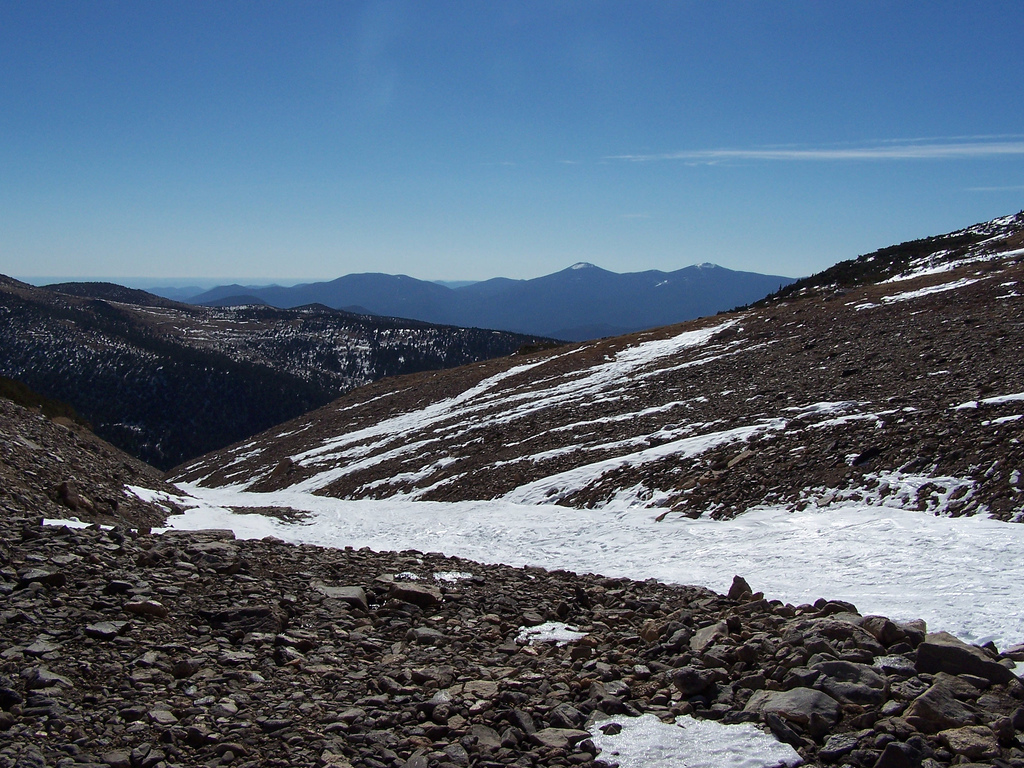
- Saint Mary's Glacier

- Location within Colorado
- Type: Semi-permanent snowfield
- Location: Clear Creek County, Colorado, United States
- Coordinates: 39°50′09″N 105°38′49″W
- Status: Retreating

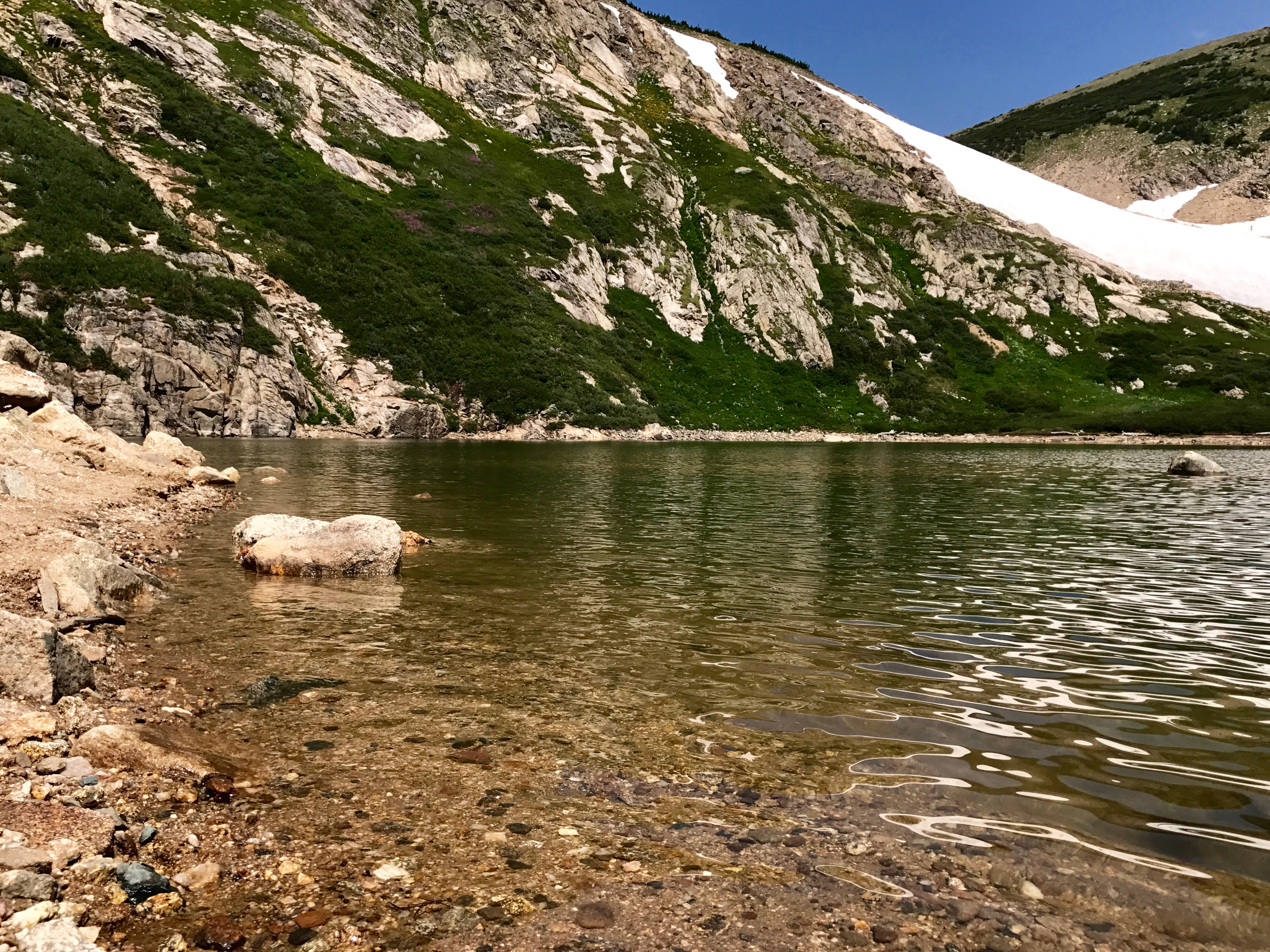
Glacial Lake at the base of Saint Mary's Glacier

Saint Mary's Glacier (or St. Marys) is a semi-permanent snowfield located in Arapaho National Forest in the U.S. state of Colorado. Saint Mary's Glacier is 2.5 mi (4.0 km) southeast of James Peak, and about an hour drive northwest from Denver The nearest community is the unincorporated Alice, Colorado and is accessible via a 1.6 mile out and back hike from a parking lot in Alice. The area is very popular for fishing, and hiking.

In 2026, Saint Mary's Glacier melted away following a hot summer. This is the first time the snowfield has completely melted in at least several hundred years.

Description of the Trail

The trail to St. Mary's Glacier is short with spectacular views. From the trailhead, the trail slowly climbs through a forest of pine and aspen trees. This first section is around .75 miles long and gains around 400 feet in elevation. Then this transitions from the forest to a clearing at St. Mary's Lake. This lake is located at the base of the snowfield. From here there are views of the surrounding mountains along with spots to rest and relax.

From the lake the trail becomes steeper and rockier, as it travels to the base of the snowfield itself. Then from this base, you can see a panoramic view of the mountain peaks of the surrounding Front Range.

== See also ==
- List of glaciers in the United States
