= Bakerville, Colorado =

Ghost town in Clear Creek County, Colorado, United States

- ghost town
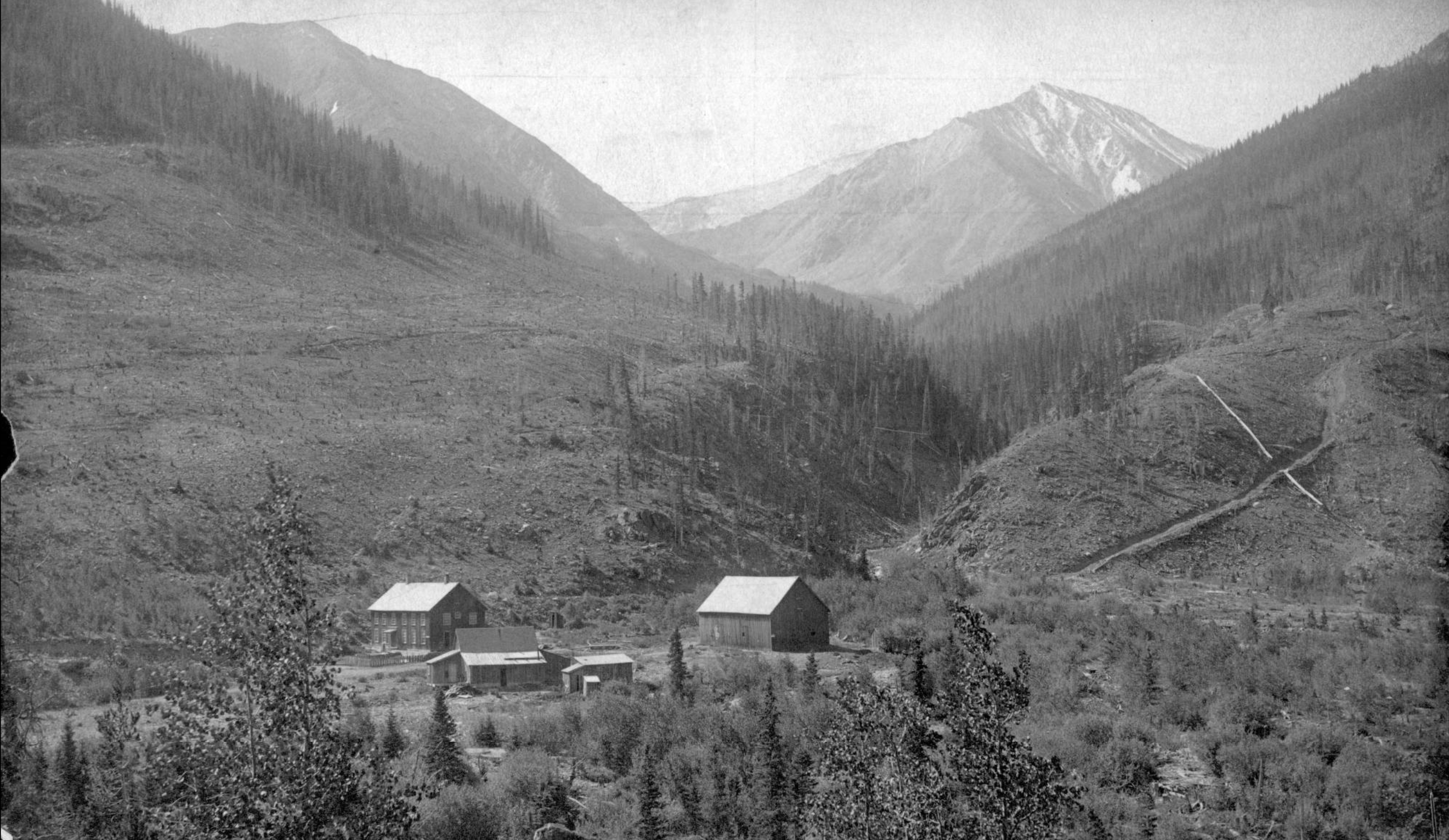
- Bakerville in the late 1860s

- Location of Bakerville, Colorado. Bakerville (Colorado)
- Coordinates: 39.6914°N 105.8050°W
- Country: United States
- State: Colorado
- County: Clear Creek
- Elevation: 9,787 ft (2,983 m)
- Time zone: UTC−07:00 (MST)
  - Summer (DST): UTC−06:00 (MDT)
- ZIP codes: 80452
- GNIS pop ID: 196497

Bakerville is a mining ghost town in Clear Creek County, Colorado, United States. It is located west of modern-day Silver Plume, south of I-70 near the fourteener peaks of Grays and Torreys.

== Description ==
Bakerville is located south of I-70, along Stevens Gulch Road, which runs towards Grays and Torreys to the South. The location is where Quayle Creek, flowing from Grays and Torreys, feeds into Clear Creek, which flows from the Continental Divide. The town is roughly 5 miles (8.0 km) east of the entrance to the Eisenhower Tunnel and 8 miles (13 km) northeast of Montezuma. The site currently includes a parking lot and several small structures.

== History ==
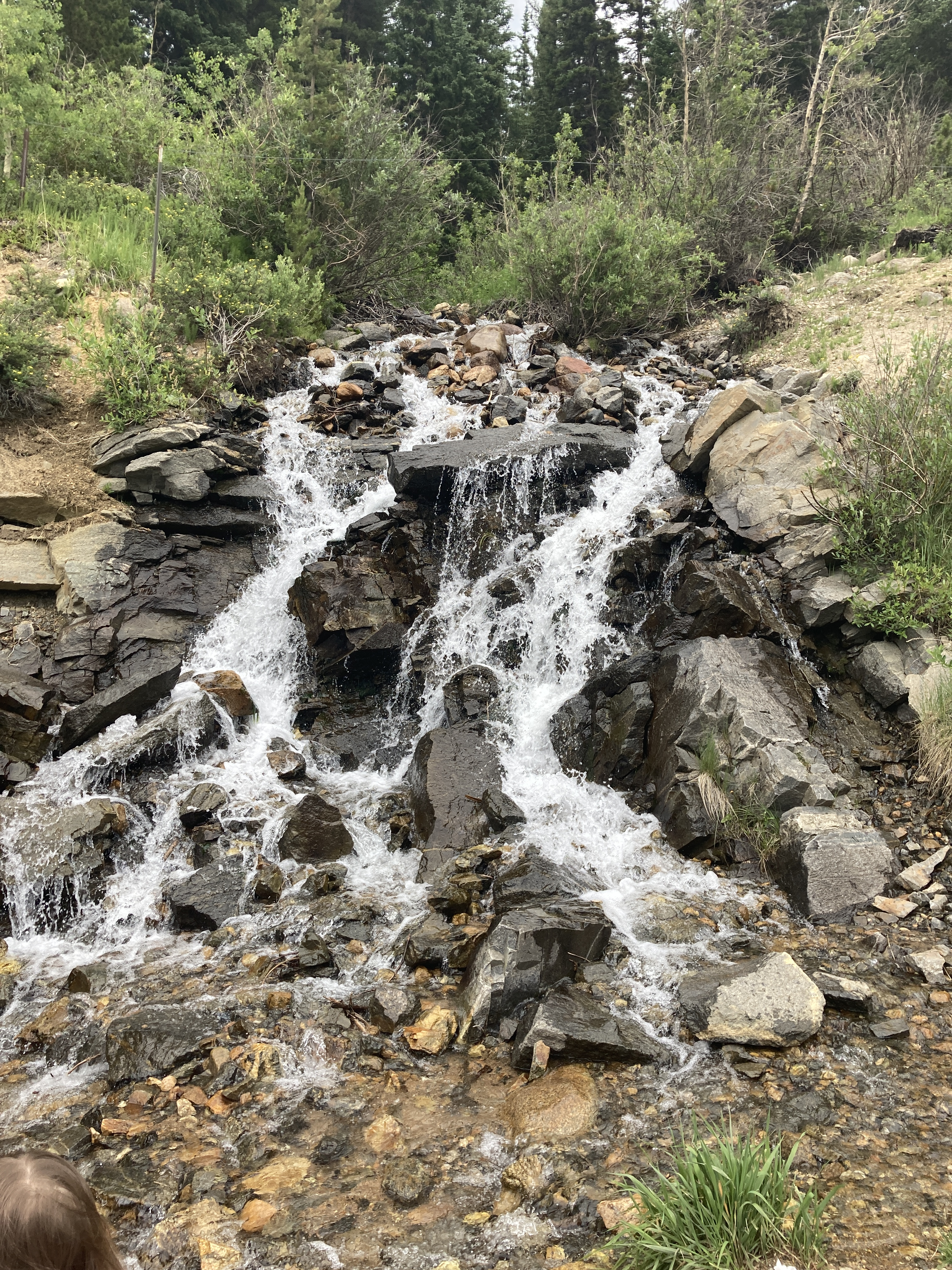
A stream near the town

The settlement was founded by three men: John Baker, William F. Kelso, and Dick Irwin, in 1865 to support their mine. The town and Baker Mine were named for Baker, while the mountain the town sits below was named for Kelso. By the late 1860s, the town sported several log cabins and fences built from timber logged off of Kelso Mountain.

In 2010, Clear Creek County opened a portion of paved trail connecting Bakerville with the Loveland Ski Area. This trail addition was part of a larger project of bike and pedestrian trails ranging from where U.S. Route 6 enters eastern Clear Creek County from Jefferson County to the Bakerville portion that merges with the Continental Divide Trail and leads into Summit County. Bakerville never had a post office.

== See also ==
- Denver–Aurora–Lakewood, CO Metropolitan Statistical Area
- Front Range Urban Corridor
- List of ghost towns in Colorado
