= List of Colorado counties by per capita income =

Coordinates: 38.9972°N 105.5478°W

The 64 counties of the U.S. State of Colorado.

Colorado is the eighth-richest state in the United States, with a per capita income of $47,346 (2022) and a median household income of $87,598 (2022).

== Colorado counties ranked by per capita income ==
Note: Per capita income data, median household income and median family income data, and number of households is sourced from the 2022 American Community Survey. Population data is sourced from the 2020 United States census.

Rank	County	Per capita income	Median household income	Median family income	Population	Number of households
1	Pitkin	$87,561	$96,123	$122,870	17,358	8,114
2	Douglas	$63,186	$139,010	$158,102	357,978	131,971
3	Broomfield	$60,862	$117,541	$154,023	74,112	30,103
4	Clear Creek	$59,550	$87,169	$123,354	9,397	4,589
5	Routt	$58,304	$95,144	$116,203	24,829	10,279
6	Gilpin	$57,593	$95,902	$116,235	5,808	2,853
7	Boulder	$57,339	$99,770	$136,591	330,758	133,390
8	Denver	$56,381	$85,853	$109,682	715,522	322,964
9	Elbert	$55,535	$124,360	$136,020	26,062	9,514
10	San Miguel	$55,184	$72,829	$97,472	8,072	3,850
11	Eagle	$55,007	$98,887	$114,344	55,731	20,084
12	Summit	$54,935	$100,611	$120,716	31,055	11,750
13	Jefferson	$54,571	$103,167	$127,276	582,910	238,372
14	Arapahoe	$49,530	$92,292	$114,803	655,070	250,751
15	Park	$48,221	$85,019	$107,599	17,390	7,688
16	Ouray	$47,768	$78,750	$89,070	4,874	2,435
	Colorado	$47,346	$87,598	$108,664	5,773,714	2,278,044
17	Hinsdale	$46,944	$58,712	$73,977	788	478
18	Larimer	$46,676	$87,199	$112,985	359,066	148,851
19	Lake	$44,794	$78,942	$98,158	7,436	2,837
20	La Plata	$44,614	$81,936	$104,101	55,638	22,691
21	Gunnison	$44,167	$76,538	$113,112	16,918	7,759
22	Grand	$43,553	$79,367	$104,579	15,717	6,238
23	San Juan	$42,678	$67,344	$72,292	705	337
24	Teller	$41,836	$69,655	$88,829	24,710	11,040
25	El Paso	$41,444	$82,748	$98,645	730,395	276,371
	United States	$41,261	$75,149	$92,646	331,449,281	125,736,353
26	Weld	$39,480	$89,182	$102,620	328,981	115,536
27	Archuleta	$39,155	$66,813	$78,896	13,359	5,738
28	Garfield	$39,024	$82,772	$96,416	61,685	22,390
29	Cheyenne	$38,791	$65,577	$88,125	1,748	740
30	Chaffee	$38,167	$65,703	$83,786	19,476	9,066
31	Dolores	$38,098	$64,708	$91,985	2,326	1,185
32	Phillips	$37,996	$58,474	$69,659	4,530	1,760
33	Mineral	$37,647	$58,929	$67,344	865	418
34	Adams	$37,550	$86,297	$98,225	519,572	181,211
35	Custer	$37,232	$66,250	$72,297	4,704	2,181
36	Mesa	$36,303	$68,077	$83,034	155,703	63,098
37	Kit Carson	$36,039	$58,992	$72,062	7,087	2,979
38	Montrose	$35,755	$62,817	$78,074	42,679	17,042
39	Rio Grande	$34,328	$57,591	$81,904	11,539	4,657
40	Saguache	$34,311	$51,946	$58,552	6,368	3,071
41	Washington	$33,374	$59,087	$69,648	4,817	2,030
42	Delta	$33,055	$56,349	$72,437	31,196	12,263
43	Moffat	$33,019	$63,983	$79,722	13,292	5,187
44	Sedgwick	$32,776	$45,855	$72,031	2,404	1,049
45	Yuma	$32,575	$60,118	$71,279	9,988	3,953
46	Pueblo	$31,513	$59,436	$73,803	168,162	67,090
47	Montezuma	$31,044	$61,377	$72,887	25,849	10,520
48	Morgan	$30,422	$70,471	$81,066	29,111	10,872
49	Rio Blanco	$30,140	$69,882	$84,716	6,529	2,513
50	Jackson	$29,657	$38,686	$53,750	1,379	645
51	Huerfano	$29,508	$49,631	$65,211	6,820	2,877
52	Logan	$29,440	$54,864	$79,579	21,528	7,985
53	Las Animas	$29,432	$48,965	$63,730	14,555	6,631
54	Prowers	$29,026	$49,422	$61,755	11,999	4,507
55	Alamosa	$28,945	$52,271	$65,720	16,376	6,471
56	Fremont	$28,224	$56,165	$73,966	48,939	17,677
57	Baca	$28,115	$42,115	$65,735	3,506	1,586
58	Kiowa	$27,957	$45,250	$60,000	1,446	551
59	Lincoln	$27,610	$59,167	$89,519	5,675	1,922
60	Otero	$25,789	$47,500	$62,013	18,690	7,594
61	Conejos	$25,240	$44,093	$62,375	7,461	3,087
62	Costilla	$24,318	$34,578	$49,120	3,499	1,530
63	Crowley	$20,909	$40,685	$62,143	5,922	1,315
64	Bent	$19,041	$45,776	$53,500	5,650	1,808

== See also ==
- Bibliography of Colorado
- Geography of Colorado
- History of Colorado
- Index of Colorado-related articles
- List of Colorado-related lists
  - List of counties in Colorado
    - List of Colorado counties by population
    - List of Colorado counties by socioeconomic factors
    - List of Colorado counties by statistical area
    - List of Colorado county high points
    - List of Colorado municipalities by county
    - List of Colorado populated places by county
    - List of county courthouses in Colorado
    - List of county seats in Colorado
- Outline of Colorado
