= List of Colorado counties by socioeconomic factors =

Coordinates: 38.9972°N 105.5478°W

The location of the State of Colorado in the United States of America.

The 64 counties of the U.S. State of Colorado.

This list of the 64 counties of the U.S. State of Colorado by socioeconomic factors is sourced from the 2020 United States census, the 2022 American Community Survey, and the County Health Rankings & Roadmaps program of the University of Wisconsin Population Health Institute. All data are five-year estimates from 2018–2022, unless otherwise noted.

Compared to the United States as a whole, Colorado has a higher per capita income, a higher rate of population growth, a better-educated population (as measured by the percentage of population aged 25 years and over with bachelor's degree or higher), and lower poverty and uninsured rates. Colorado's population has a higher percentage of non-Hispanic whites than the U.S. as a whole, although two Colorado counties — Costilla and Conejos — have a majority-Hispanic population. The state's vote in the 2024 presidential election was greater for the Democratic candidate than the Republican candidate.

Colorado has a longer life expectancy than the U.S. as a whole. In 2014, a study by the Institute for Health Metrics and Evaluation concluded that the residents of Summit, Pitkin, and Eagle counties — noted for their ski resorts in Breckenridge, Aspen, and Vail, respectively — in the high-elevation Rocky Mountains enjoyed the longest life expectancy among all U.S. counties. Factors contributing to their lengthy life expectancy were "high education, high income, high access to medical care", as well as people being "physically active", with obesity being "lower than anywhere else" per Dr. Ali Mokdad, one of the study's co-authors.

Colorado's median household income and median family income exceed the national median. By median household income, Colorado's Douglas county ranks 8th, Elbert ranks 24th, and Broomfield ranks 40th among all U.S. counties.

While some Colorado counties exceed the U.S. average in positive socioeconomic factors, a sizable number of Colorado counties are below the U.S. average. 40 Colorado counties have a median household income below the national median and 26 have a life expectancy below the national average.

Depending on the methodology used and the time of measurement, socioeconomic statistics cited may vary from year to year — especially in counties with small populations where, for example, the gain or loss of a major employer may result in a sizable change in measurements of poverty, population growth, income, and others.

== Socioeconomic statistics for Colorado counties ==
	Per capita income	Median household income	Median family income	Population 2020	Number of households	Population growth rate 2010–2020	% white alone, not Hispanic or Latino 2020	Life expectancy in years 2019–2021	% of people in poverty	% of population 25 years and over with bachelor's degree or higher	% of people without health insurance	% vote for Harris in 2024 election
United States	$41,261	$75,149	$92,646	331,449,520	125,736,353	7.4%	57.8%	77.6	12.5%	34.3%	8.7%	48.32%
Colorado	$47,346	$87,598	$108,664	5,773,714	2,278,044	14.8%	65.1%	79.0	9.6%	43.7%	7.8%	54.13%
Adams	$37,550	$86,297	$98,225	519,572	181,211	17.7%	46.1%	77.5	9.6%	27.2%	10.8%	53.13%
Alamosa	$28,945	$52,271	$65,720	16,376	6,471	6.0%	45.7%	73.0	15.5%	28.2%	8.4%	43.09%
Arapahoe	$49,530	$92,292	$114,803	655,070	250,751	14.5%	56.2%	79.7	8.0%	44.9%	8.7%	58.57%
Archuleta	$39,155	$66,813	$78,896	13,359	5,738	7.0%	76.2%	80.9	8.2%	39.4%	11.0%	41.72%
Baca	$28,115	$42,115	$65,735	3,506	1,586	−7.4%	83.2%	72.4	23.0%	24.4%	6.6%	13.72%
Bent	$19,041	$45,776	$53,500	5,650	1,808	−13.1%	58.7%	73.9	27.1%	15.5%	7.0%	29.47%
Boulder	$57,339	$99,770	$136,591	330,758	133,390	12.3%	74.1%	82.2	11.3%	63.2%	4.4%	76.49%
Broomfield	$60,862	$117,541	$154,023	74,112	30,103	32.6%	72.7%	82.0	5.0%	58.4%	5.2%	62.81%
Chaffee	$38,167	$65,703	$83,786	19,476	9,066	9.4%	83.2%	81.8	11.8%	41.4%	8.2%	55.41%
Cheyenne	$38,791	$65,577	$88,125	1,748	740	−4.8%	84.1%	77.5	10.9%	23.4%	7.2%	10.24%
Clear Creek	$59,550	$87,169	$123,354	9,397	4,589	3.4%	86.7%	82.8	6.6%	55.0%	9.2%	56.77%
Conejos	$25,240	$44,093	$62,375	7,461	3,087	−9.6%	46.4%	72.7	15.7%	24.6%	14.4%	39.63%
Costilla	$24,318	$34,578	$49,120	3,499	1,530	−0.7%	35.3%	73.4	22.5%	23.7%	8.0%	55.53%
Crowley	$20,909 (Note: Crowley County hosts a large prison with nearly 3,000 prisoners which accounts for the exceptionally low per capita income.)	$40,685	$62,143	5,922	1,315	1.7%	58.1%	72.5	24.2%	12.7%	6.6%	24.74%
Custer	$37,232	$66,250	$72,297	4,704	2,181	10.5%	89.5%	80.9	7.7%	36.5%	10.9%	30.72%
Delta	$33,055	$56,349	$72,437	31,196	12,263	0.8%	79.8%	76.2	15.0%	24.5%	11.0%	30.96%
Denver	$56,381	$85,853	$109,682	715,522	322,964	19.2%	54.3%	78.1	11.7%	54.2%	9.1%	76.65%
Dolores	$38,098	$64,708	$91,985	2,326	1,185	12.7%	83.8%	74.6	16.7%	26.3%	8.3%	22.90%
Douglas	$63,186	$139,010	$158,102	357,978	131,971	25.4%	77.9%	82.8	3.0%	60.0%	3.6%	45.27%
Eagle	$55,007	$98,887	$114,344	55,731	20,084	6.1%	65.0%	88.9	8.0%	51.8%	10.4%	60.94%
El Paso	$41,444	$82,748	$98,645	730,395	276,371	17.4%	65.8%	76.9	9.2%	40.2%	7.5%	43.73%
Elbert	$55,535	$124,360	$136,020	26,062	9,514	12.9%	85.1%	81.6	4.3%	35.6%	5.0%	23.35%
Fremont	$28,224	$56,165	$73,966	48,939	17,677	4.5%	77.1%	76.0	15.0%	20.2%	6.9%	29.55%
Garfield	$39,024	$82,772	$96,416	61,685	22,390	8.9%	62.6%	80.2	8.1%	33.7%	17.5%	49.80%
Gilpin	$57,593	$95,902	$116,235	5,808	2,853	6.7%	85.3%	80.8	9.3%	43.9%	8.7%	54.58%
Grand	$43,553	$79,367	$104,579	15,717	6,238	5.9%	85.5%	84.8	8.6%	37.8%	12.3%	47.99%
Gunnison	$44,167	$76,538	$113,112	16,918	7,759	10.4%	84.3%	82.9	10.8%	59.3%	7.2%	62.94%
Hinsdale	$46,944	$58,712	$73,977	788	478	−6.5%	87.9%		7.4%	44.6%	12.6%	42.34%
Huerfano	$29,508	$49,631	$65,211	6,820	2,877	1.6%	62.0%	73.7	20.6%	26.1%	6.1%	44.24%
Jackson	$29,657	$38,686	$53,750	1,379	645	−1.1%	84.2%		20.9%	27.5%	10.0%	20.74%
Jefferson	$54,571	$103,167	$127,276	582,910	238,372	9.0%	74.7%	79.5	6.7%	49.1%	5.2%	58.30%
Kiowa	$27,957	$45,250	$60,000	1,446	551	3.4%	86.2%		15.9%	18.0%	8.4%	11.82%
Kit Carson	$36,039	$58,992	$72,062	7,087	2,979	−14.3%	74.9%	76.2	9.4%	18.0%	12.1%	15.04%
La Plata	$44,614	$81,936	$104,101	55,638	22,691	8.4%	76.2%	81.1	11.4%	47.0%	9.5%	57.93%
Lake	$44,794	$78,942	$98,158	7,436	2,837	1.7%	57.7%	82.2	7.3%	39.2%	16.4%	56.20%
Larimer	$46,676	$87,199	$112,985	359,066	148,851	19.8%	78.7%	81.0	11.4%	50.9%	5.9%	57.33%
Las Animas	$29,432	$48,965	$63,730	14,555	6,631	−6.1%	54.7%	74.8	19.0%	16.5%	8.9%	42.04%
Lincoln	$27,610	$59,167	$89,519	5,675	1,922	3.8%	74.9%	78.4	11.6%	22.7%	8.1%	16.80%
Logan	$29,440	$54,864	$79,579	21,528	7,985	−5.2%	75.9%	75.4	11.7%	19.7%	7.2%	20.64%
Mesa	$36,303	$68,077	$83,034	155,703	63,098	6.1%	77.6%	77.0	11.5%	30.0%	9.9%	36.64%
Mineral	$37,647	$58,929	$67,344	865	418	13.1%	89.6%		11.2%	57.7%	14.5%	42.10%
Moffat	$33,019	$63,983	$79,722	13,292	5,187	3.6%	77.6%	74.6	14.8%	20.5%	10.1%	17.49%
Montezuma	$31,044	$61,377	$72,887	25,849	10,520	1.2%	69.8%	75.1	12.5%	30.1%	11.2%	38.27%
Montrose	$35,755	$62,817	$78,074	42,679	17,042	3.4%	72.9%	78.7	11.6%	27.7%	13.3%	32.60%
Morgan	$30,422	$70,471	$81,066	29,111	10,872	3.4%	56.8%	75.6	12.8%	17.7%	11.6%	24.44%
Otero	$25,789	$47,500	$62,013	18,690	7,594	−0.7%	53.6%	70.9	24.0%	18.3%	8.0%	35.45%
Ouray	$47,768	$78,750	$89,070	4,874	2,435	9.9%	88.4%	87.5	4.8%	49.6%	14.6%	59.59%
Park	$48,221	$85,019	$107,599	17,390	7,688	7.3%	85.7%	85.4	6.8%	35.5%	8.8%	40.18%
Phillips	$37,996	$58,474	$69,659	4,530	1,760	2.0%	71.7%	77.7	13.9%	26.3%	8.0%	17.49%
Pitkin	$87,561	$96,123	$122,870	17,358	8,114	1.2%	83.1%	92.7	6.7%	63.1%	4.4%	71.02%
Prowers	$29,026	$49,422	$61,755	11,999	4,507	4.4%	55.7%	74.1	17.6%	18.2%	10.5%	23.85%
Pueblo	$31,513	$59,436	$73,803	168,162	67,090	5.7%	50.9%	73.6	16.6%	24.1%	6.3%	46.20%
Rio Blanco	$30,140	$69,882	$84,716	6,529	2,513	−2.2%	84.4%	78.9	12.9%	23.8%	9.3%	17.25%
Rio Grande	$34,328	$57,591	$81,904	11,539	4,657	−3.7%	54.3%	74.3	10.3%	31.3%	14.2%	37.23%
Routt	$58,304	$95,144	$116,203	24,829	10,279	5.6%	85.6%	84.0	8.0%	50.0%	8.5%	62.49%
Saguache	$34,311	$51,946	$58,552	6,368	3,071	4.4%	56.2%	78.6	17.5%	24.4%	11.1%	50.10%
San Juan	$42,678	$67,344	$72,292	705	337	0.9%	81.6%		19.1%	41.7%	16.5%	63.84%
San Miguel	$55,184	$72,829	$97,472	8,072	3,850	9.7%	83.7%	88.3	8.5%	62.2%	10.3%	73.46%
Sedgwick	$32,776	$45,855	$72,031	2,404	1,049	1.1%	80.4%	76.3	16.1%	26.5%	7.8%	20.84%
Summit	$54,935	$100,611	$120,716	31,055	11,750	10.9%	76.6%	93.0	7.4%	52.3%	11.0%	67.04%
Teller	$41,836	$69,655	$88,829	24,710	11,040	5.8%	85.1%	79.4	7.0%	38.0%	7.0%	31.00%
Washington	$33,374	$59,087	$69,648	4,817	2,030	0.1%	84.2%	75.1	9.7%	24.5%	4.6%	11.72%
Weld	$39,480	$89,182	$102,620	328,981	115,536	30.1%	62.6%	79.3	9.7%	30.7%	8.5%	38.21%
Yuma	$32,575	$60,118	$71,279	9,988	3,953	−0.5%	69.6%	79.0	14.0%	24.4%	15.4%	16.26%

== See also ==
- Bibliography of Colorado
- Geography of Colorado
- History of Colorado
- Index of Colorado-related articles
- List of Colorado-related lists
  - List of counties in Colorado
    - List of Colorado counties by per capita income
    - List of Colorado counties by population
    - List of Colorado counties by statistical area
    - List of Colorado county high points
    - List of Colorado municipalities by county
    - List of Colorado populated places by county
    - List of county courthouses in Colorado
    - List of county seats in Colorado
- Outline of Colorado
