= St. Mary's, Colorado =

Unincorporated community in Clear Creek County, CO, USA

- Census-designated place
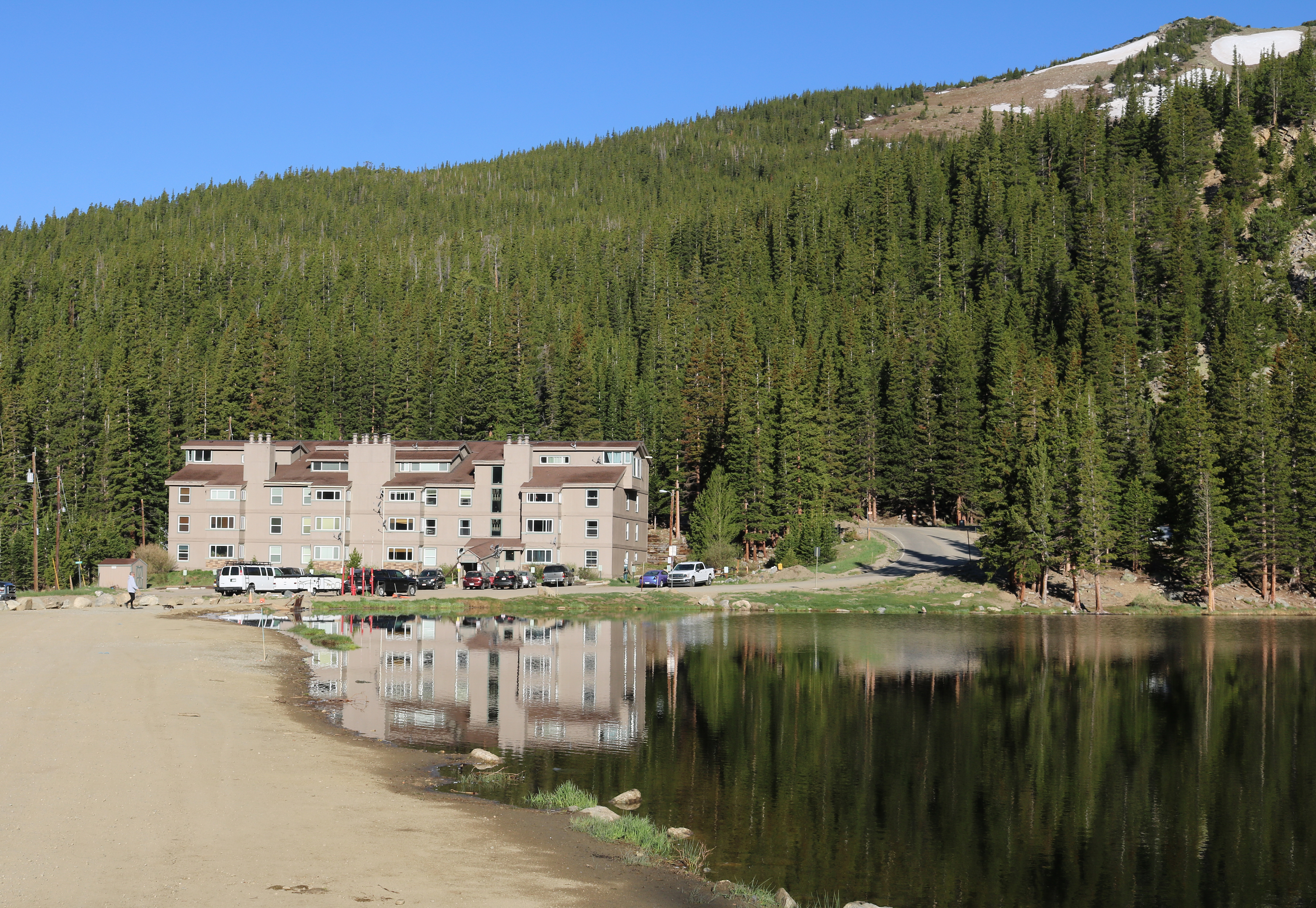
- The Silver Lake Condos, with part of Silver Lake on the right, June 2021

- Location of the St. Mary's CDP in Clear Creek County, Colorado
- Coordinates: 39°48′59″N 105°38′52″W
- Country: United States
- State: Colorado
- County: Clear Creek County

Government
  - Type: unincorporated community

Area
  - Total: 1.446 sq mi (3.744 km^{2})
  - Land: 1.439 sq mi (3.726 km^{2})
  - Water: 0.0069 sq mi (0.018 km^{2})
- Elevation: 10,063 ft (3,067 m)

Population (2020)
  - Total: 333
  - Density: 231/sq mi (89.4/km^{2})
- Time zone: UTC-7 (MST)
  - Summer (DST): UTC-6 (MDT)
- ZIP Code: Idaho Springs 80452
- Area codes: 303 & 720
- GNIS feature ID: 2409229

St. Mary's or Saint Mary's is a census-designated place (CDP) located in and governed by Clear Creek County, Colorado, United States. The CDP is a part of the Denver–Aurora–Lakewood, CO Metropolitan Statistical Area. The population of the St. Mary's CDP was 333 at the United States Census 2020. The St. Mary's Glacier Metropolitan District and the St. Mary's Glacier Water & Sanitation District provide services. The Idaho Springs post office (Zip Code 80452) serves the area.

== Geography ==
The St. Mary's CDP has an area of 925 acres (3.744 km^{2}), including 4.4 acres (0.018 km^{2}) of water.

== Demographics ==
St. Mary's CDP, Colorado
Year	Pop.	±%
2000	251	—
2010	283	+12.7%
2020	333	+17.7%
Source: United States Census Bureau

The United States Census Bureau initially defined the St. Mary's CDP for the United States Census 2000.

== Historic ski area ==
- St. Mary's Glacier Ski Area

== See also ==
- List of census-designated places in Colorado
