= Alice, Colorado =

Ghost town in Clear Creek County, Colorado, United States

- Ghost town
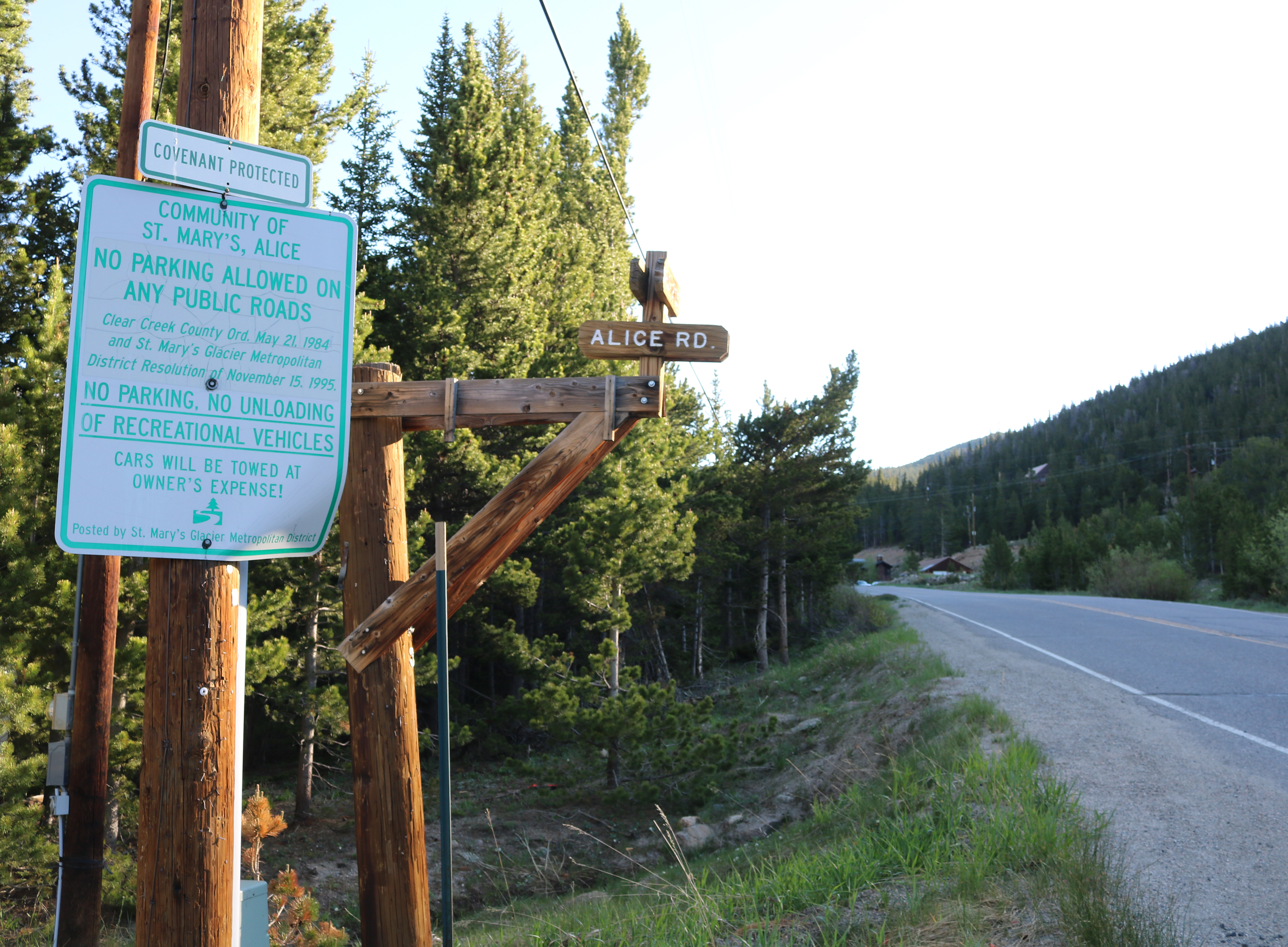
- Signs at the intersection of Fall River and Alice roads in Alice

- Location of Alice, Colorado. Alice (Colorado)
- Coordinates: 39.8183°N 105.6428°W
- Country: United States
- State: Colorado
- County: Clear Creek

Government
  - Body: Clear Creek County
- Elevation: 10,092 ft (3,076 m)
- Time zone: UTC−07:00 (MST)
  - Summer (DST): UTC−06:00 (MDT)
- GNIS pop ID: 181369

Alice is a ghost town located in Clear Creek County, Colorado, United States.

== History ==
The Alice post office operated from August 20, 1898, until December 31, 1938. The community was named after Alice Taylor, the wife of a mine official.

== See also ==
- Denver–Aurora–Lakewood, CO Metropolitan Statistical Area
- Front Range Urban Corridor
- List of populated places in Colorado
- List of post offices in Colorado
