= James Fawcett (politician) =

American politician

Member of the Kansas House of Representatives from the 65th district
- In office January 10, 2011 – January 14, 2013
- Preceded by: Barbara Craft
- Succeeded by: Allan Rothlisberg

Personal details
- Party: Republican
- Spouse: Sue
- Children: Todd and Emily
- Education: Washburn University; Graduate School of Banking at Colorado

James Fawcett is a former Republican member of the Kansas House of Representatives representing the 65th district, which includes Junction City and Alta Vista and parts of Geary and Wabasunsee Counties, from 2011 until 2013. Fawcett attended Washburn University for his BA in History/Political Science and studied banking at the Graduate School of Banking at Colorado at the University of Colorado. Fawcett served in the 101st Airborne Division leaving the service in 1975 as a disabled Vietnam War veteran with the rank of captain.

== Committee membership ==
- Veterans, Military and Homeland Security
- Financial Institutions
- Insurance
- Transportation
