= Echo Hills, Colorado =

Census-designated place in Clear Creek County, Colorado, United States

- Census-designated place
- Location of the Echo Hills CDP, Colorado. Echo Hills (Colorado)
- Coordinates: 39°40′29″N 105°24′48″W
- Country: United States
- State: Colorado
- County: Clear Creek

Government
  - Type: Unincorporated community
  - Body: Clear Creek County

Area
  - Total: 0.568 sq mi (1.472 km^{2})
  - Land: 0.568 sq mi (1.472 km^{2})
  - Water: 0 sq mi (0.000 km^{2})
- Elevation: 9,046 ft (2,757 m)

Population (2020)
  - Total: 313
- Time zone: UTC−07:00 (MST)
  - Summer (DST): UTC−06:00 (MDT)
- ZIP code: Evergreen 80439
- Area codes: 303/720/983
- GNIS town ID: 2804449
- FIPS code: 08-22882

Echo Hills is an unincorporated community and a census-designated place (CDP) located in and governed by Clear Creek County, Colorado, United States. The population was 313 at the 2020 census. The CDP is a part of the Denver-Aurora-Centennial, CO Metropolitan Statistical Area. The Evergreen post office (Zip Code 80439) serves the area.

== Geography ==
The Echo Hills CDP has an area of 364 acres (1.472 km^{2}), all land.

== Demographics ==
The United States Census Bureau defined the Echo Hills CDP for the United States Census 2020.

Echo Hills CDP, Colorado
Year	Pop.	±%
2020	313	—
Source: United States Census Bureau

== See also ==
- Front Range Urban Corridor
