= Pine Valley, Colorado =

Census-designated place in Clear County, CO, USA

- Census-designated place
- Location of the Pine Valley CDP in the State of Colorado
- Coordinates: 39°41′27″N 105°24′48″W
- Country: United States
- State: Colorado
- County: Clear Creek County

Government
  - Type: unincorporated community

Area
  - Total: 0.824 sq mi (2.133 km^{2})
  - Land: 0.824 sq mi (2.133 km^{2})
  - Water: 0 sq mi (0.000 km^{2})
- Elevation: 8,406 ft (2,562 m)

Population (2020)
  - Total: 363
  - Density: 441/sq mi (170/km^{2})
- Time zone: UTC-7 (MST)
  - Summer (DST): UTC-6 (MDT)
- ZIP Code: Evergreen 80439
- Area codes: 303 & 720
- GNIS feature ID: 2804448

Pine Valley is an unincorporated community and a census-designated place (CDP) located in and governed by Clear Creek County, Colorado, United States. The population was 363 at the 2020 census. The CDP is a part of the Denver–Aurora–Lakewood, CO Metropolitan Statistical Area. The Evergreen post office (Zip Code 80439) serves the area.

== Geography ==
The Pine Valley CDP has an area of 527 acres (2.133 km^{2}), all land.

== Demographics ==
The United States Census Bureau defined the Pine Valley CDP for the United States Census 2020.

Pine Valley CDP, Colorado
Year	Pop.	±%
2020	363	—
Source: United States Census Bureau

== See also ==
- Front Range Urban Corridor
