= Colorado State Highway 103 =

State highway in Colorado, United States

State Highway 103
- SH 103 highlighted in red

Route information
- Maintained by CDOT
- Length: 22.488 mi (36.191 km)

Major junctions
- North end: I-70 / US 6 / US 40 at Idaho Springs
- South end: CR 103

Location
- Country: United States
- State: Colorado
- Counties: Clear Creek

Highway system
- Colorado State Highway System; Interstate; US; State; Scenic
← SH 101	→ SH 105

State Highway 103 (SH 103) in the U.S. state of Colorado runs from Interstate 70 (I-70), U.S. Route 6 (US 6) and US 40 at Idaho Springs to county roads 151 and 103 at Mestaa'ėhehe Pass. The 13 miles (19 km) from Idaho Springs to SH 5 forms about half of the Mount Blue Sky Scenic Byway.

== Route description ==
East of where the route begins at County Road 151, the highway is maintained by Clear Creek County, where it continues as County Road 103 (formerly Squaw Pass Road) that descends towards the Jefferson County Border. East of the county border, it continues as County Road 66 into Evergreen. Near Mestaa'ėhehe Pass, the highway heads west along the upper end of Echo Mountain Ski Area. The highway then reaches an elevation of 10,000 feet at Echo Lake Park, where it meets SH 5. At this point, both SH 103 and SH 5 forms the Mount Blue Sky Scenic Byway, which is the highest paved road in North America. The route then descends in elevation, heading northeast along the Chicago Creek, then enters Idaho Springs after crossing Clear Creek. SH 103 terminates at Interstate 70 at a diamond interchange and the road continues as 13th Avenue through the neighborhood.

== History ==
The route was established in 1923, where it began at US 285 and traversed to Idaho Springs. The segment east of Mestaa'ėhehe Pass was renumbered in 1954, and the route was entirely paved by 1956.

== Major intersections ==
The entire route is in Clear Creek County.

Location	mi	km	Destinations	Notes
Mestaa'ėhehe Pass	0.000	0.000	Little Bear Creek Road (CR 151)	Southern terminus; road continues east as CR 103
	5.488– 6.771	8.832– 10.897	Juniper Pass Summit – elevation 11,020 feet (3,360 m)	
	9.223	14.843	SH 5 south – Mount Blue Sky	Northern terminus of SH 5
Idaho Springs	22.369– 22.488	35.999– 36.191	I-70 / US 6 / US 40 – Denver, Grand Junction	Northern terminus; I-70 exit 240; road continues as 13th Street
1.000 mi = 1.609 km; 1.000 km = 0.621 mi

== Gallery ==
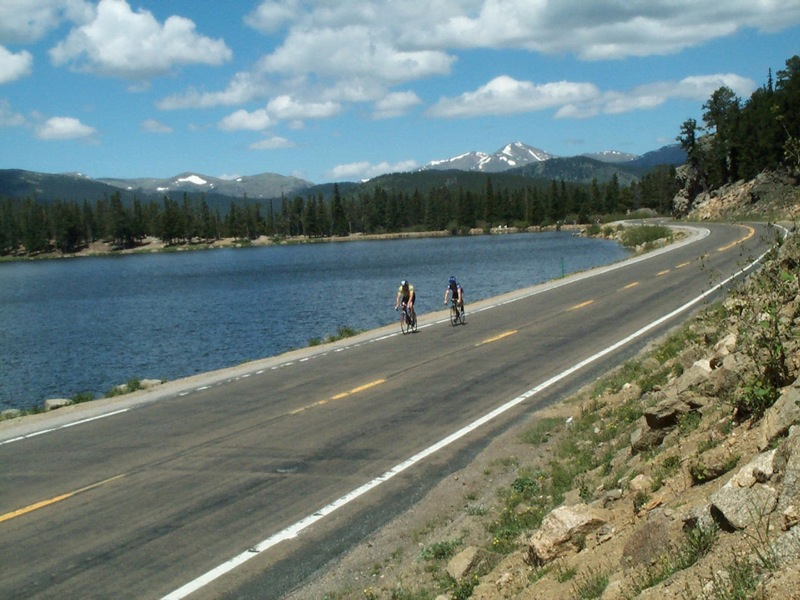
SH 103 at Echo Lake

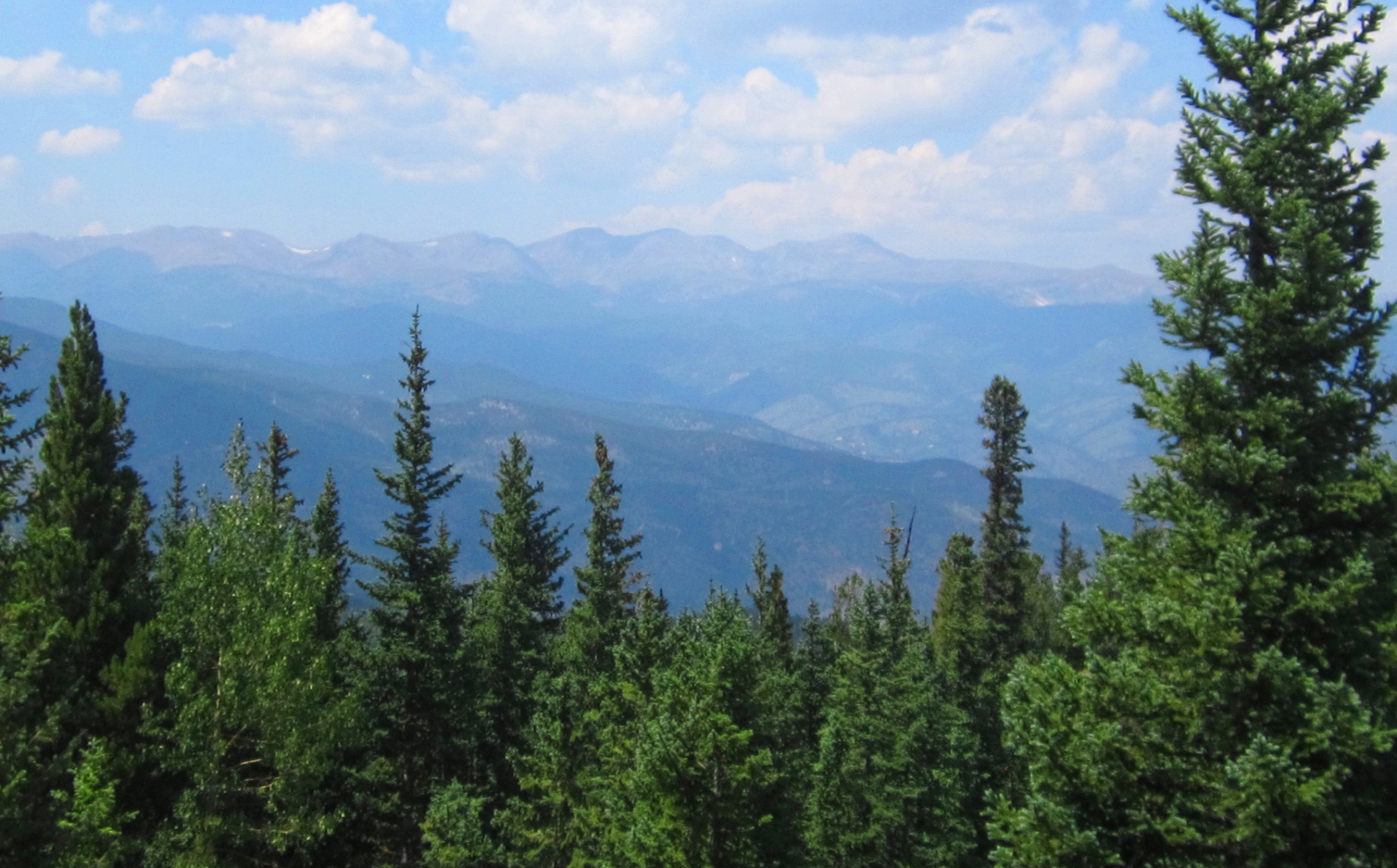
Looking northwest from near the summit of Mestaa'ėhehe Pass

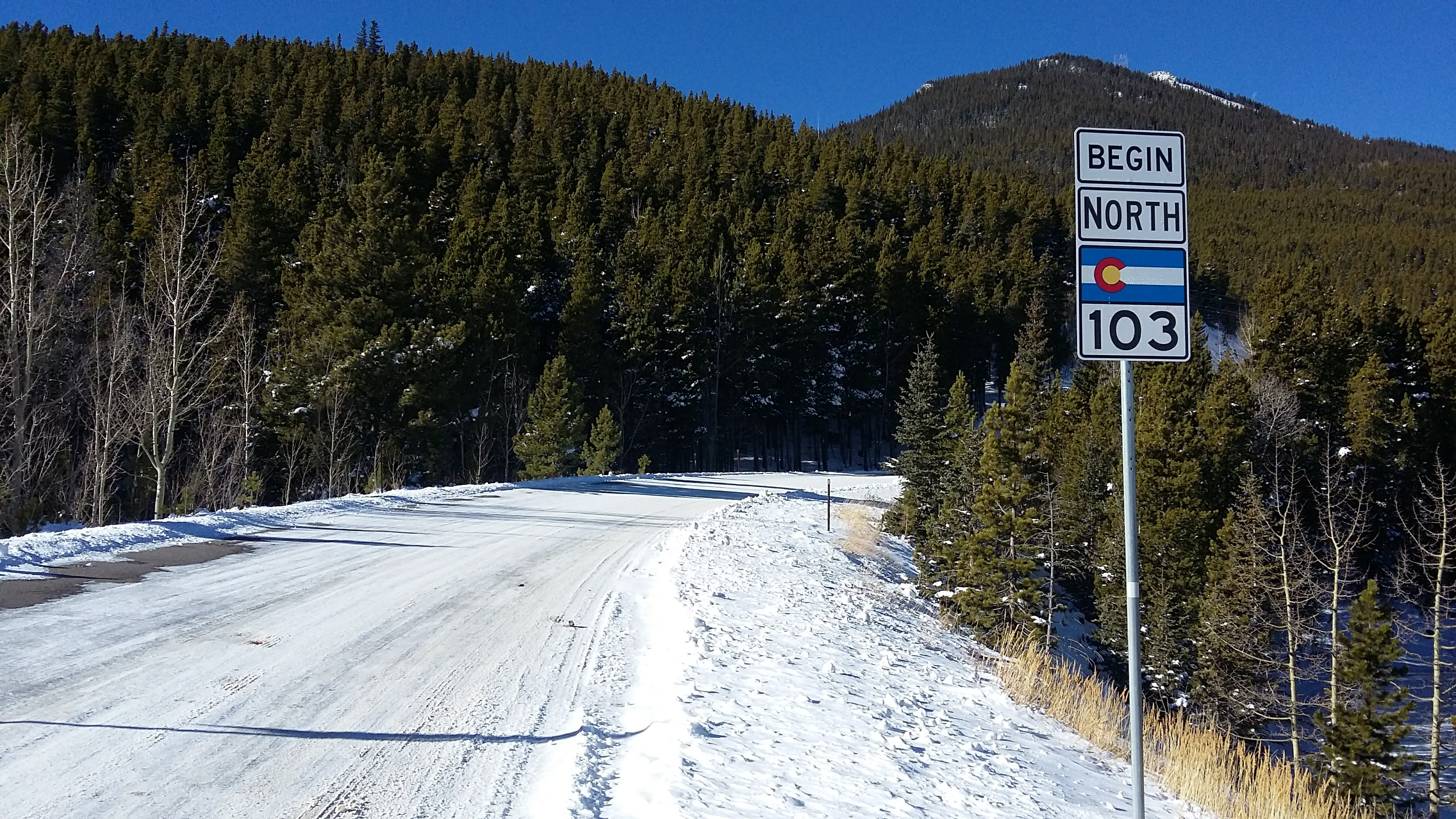
State Highway 103 near the southern terminus

== See also ==
- List of state highways in Colorado
