= Barbara Craft =

American politician (born 1942)

Member of the Kansas House of Representatives from the 65th district
- In office January 13, 2003 – January 10, 2011
- Preceded by: Bill Levinson
- Succeeded by: James Fawcett

Personal details
- Born: November 23, 1942 (age 83) Junction City, Kansas, U.S.
- Party: Republican

Barbara Craft (November 23, 1942) is a Republican former member of the Kansas House of Representatives, representing the 65th district. She served from 2003 to 2011.

Prior to her election to the House, Craft served on the Unified School District 475 Board of Education from 1987 to 2003. She has worked as owner/manager of Craft's Prescription Pharmacy and was director of the blood bank and Irwin Army Hospital.

Craft is currently a member of the Geary County Republican Women, Kansas for a Strong Fort Riley (KFSFR), Kansans Committee Old Trooper Regiment, Incorporated, Women's Connection, and the Junction City Chamber of Commerce.

== Committee membership ==
- Appropriations
- Vision 2020
- Veterans, Military and Homeland Security
- Education Budget
- Joint Committee on Corrections and Juvenile Justice Oversight

== Major donors ==
The top 5 donors to Craft's 2008 campaign are mostly professional organizations:

- 1. Kansas Dental Assoc $1,000
- 2. Kansas Medical Society $1,000
- 3. Kansas Contractors Assoc $1,000
- 4. Greater Kansas City Chamber of Commerce $750
- 5. Kansas Livestock Assoc $750
