= Blue Valley, Colorado =

Census-designated place in Clear Creek County, Colorado, United States

- Census-designated place
- Location of Blue Valley, Colorado. Blue Valley (Colorado)
- Coordinates: 39°41′57″N 105°29′50″W
- Country: United States
- State: Colorado
- County: Clear Creek

Government
  - Type: Unincorporated community
  - Body: Clear Creek County

Area
  - Total: 1.052 sq mi (2.725 km^{2})
  - Land: 1.052 sq mi (2.725 km^{2})
  - Water: 0 sq mi (0.000 km^{2})
- Elevation: 9,334 ft (2,845 m)

Population (2020)
  - Total: 173
  - Density: 164/sq mi (63.5/km^{2})
- Time zone: UTC−07:00 (MST)
  - Summer (DST): UTC−06:00 (MDT)
- ZIP Code: Idaho Springs 80452
- Area codes: 303/720/983
- GNIS town ID: 2812662
- FIPS code: 08-07455

Blue Valley is an unincorporated community and a census-designated place (CDP) located in Clear Creek County, Colorado, United States. The population was 173 at the 2020 census. The CDP is a part of the Denver–Aurora–Lakewood, CO Metropolitan Statistical Area. Blue Valley has never had a post office, but the Idaho Springs post office (Zip Code 80452) serves the area.

== Geography ==
At the 2020 United States Census, the Blue Valley CDP had an area of 673 acres (2.725 km^{2}), all land.

== Demographics ==
The United States Census Bureau defined the Blue Valley CDP for the United States Census 2020.

Blue Valley CDP, Colorado
Year	Pop.	±%
2020	173	—
Source: United States Census Bureau

== See also ==
- Front Range Urban Corridor
