= Brook Forest, Colorado =

Census-designated place in Jefferson and Clear Creek counties, Colorado, United States

- Census-designated place
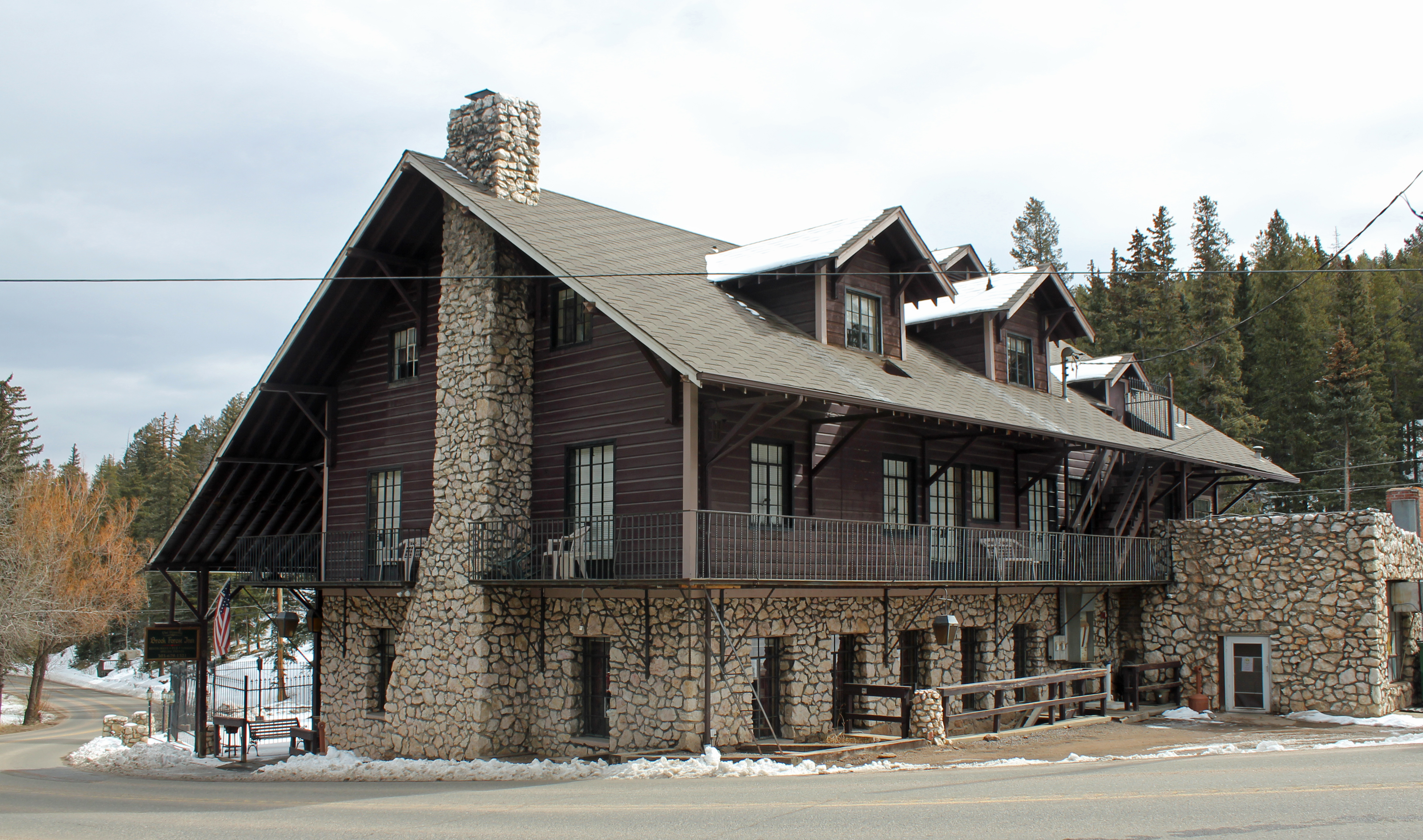
- Brook Forest Inn.

- Location of Brook Forest, Colorado. Brook Forest (Colorado)
- Coordinates: 39°34′26″N 105°23′40″W
- Country: United States
- State: Colorado
- County: Jefferson and Clear Creek

Government
  - Type: unincorporated community
  - Body: Jefferson and Clear Creek counties

Area
  - Total: 1.389 sq mi (3.597 km^{2})
  - Land: 1.389 sq mi (3.597 km^{2})
  - Water: 0 sq mi (0.000 km^{2})
- Elevation: 8,449 ft (2,575 m)

Population (2020)
  - Total: 622
  - Density: 448/sq mi (173/km^{2})
- Time zone: UTC−07:00 (MST)
  - Summer (DST): UTC−06:00 (MDT)
- ZIP code: Evergreen 80439
- Area codes: 303/720/983
- GNIS town ID: 2804446
- FIPS code: 08-08950

Brook Forest is an unincorporated community and a census-designated place (CDP) located in Jefferson and Clear Creek counties, Colorado, United States. The population was 622 at the 2020 census. The CDP is a part of the Denver–Aurora–Lakewood, CO Metropolitan Statistical Area.

== History ==
The Brook Forest, Colorado, post office operated from October 11, 1921, until Feb 15, 1949. The Evergreen Post Office (ZIP Code 80439) now serves the area.

== Geography ==
At the 2020 United States Census, the Brook Forest CDP had an area of 889 acres (3.597 km^{2}), all land.

== Demographics ==
The United States Census Bureau defined the Brook Forest CDP for the United States Census 2020.

Brook Forest CDP, Colorado
Year	Pop.	±%
2020	622	—
Source: United States Census Bureau

== See also ==
- Front Range Urban Corridor
