= Upper Witter Gulch, Colorado =

Census-designated place in Clear Creek County, CO, USA

- Census-designated place
- Location of the Upper Witter Gulch CDP in the State of Colorado
- Coordinates: 39°39′40″N 105°25′37″W
- Country: United States
- State: Colorado
- County: Clear Creek County

Government
  - Type: Unincorporated community

Area
  - Total: 0.910 sq mi (2.358 km^{2})
  - Land: 0.910 sq mi (2.358 km^{2})
  - Water: 0 sq mi (0.000 km^{2})
- Elevation: 8,275 ft (2,522 m)

Population (2020)
  - Total: 347
  - Density: 381/sq mi (147/km^{2})
- Time zone: UTC-7 (MST)
  - Summer (DST): UTC-6 (MDT)
- ZIP Code: Evergreen 80439
- Area codes: 303 & 720
- GNIS feature ID: 2804450

Upper Witter Gulch is an unincorporated community and a census-designated place (CDP) located in and governed by Clear Creek County, Colorado, United States. The population was 347 at the 2020 census. The CDP is a part of the Denver–Aurora–Lakewood, CO Metropolitan Statistical Area. The Evergreen post office (Zip Code 80439) serves the area.

== Geography ==
The Upper Witter Gulch CDP has an area of 583 acres (2.358 km^{2}), all land.

== Demographics ==
The United States Census Bureau defined the Upper Witter Gulch CDP for the United States Census 2020.

Upper Witter Gulch CDP, Colorado
Year	Pop.	±%
2020	347	—
Source: United States Census Bureau

== See also ==
- Front Range Urban Corridor
