= Floyd Hill, Colorado =

Census-designated place in Clear Creek County, Colorado, United States

- Census-designated place
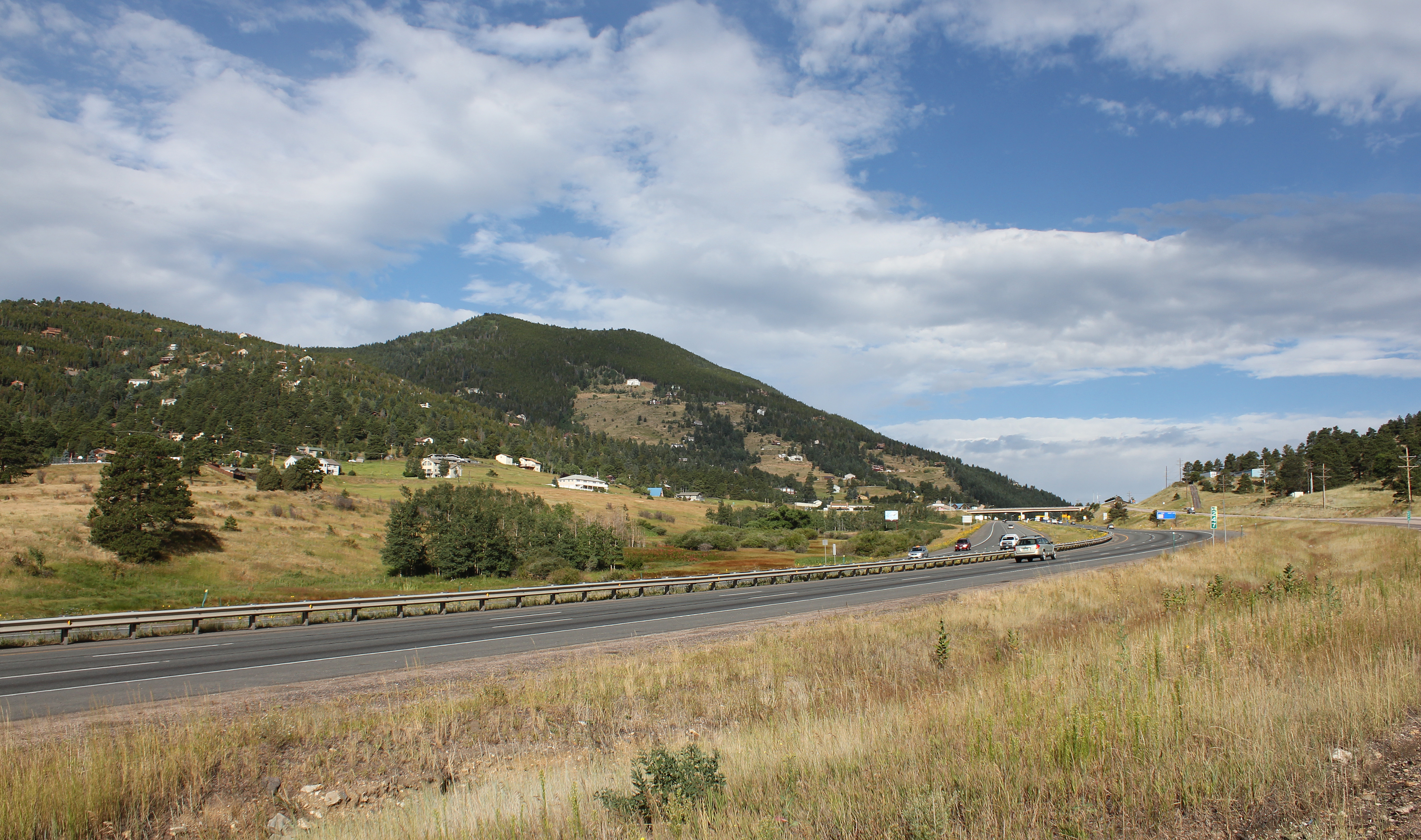
- Interstate 70 passes through the community of Floyd Hill.

- Location of the Floyd Hill CDP in Clear Creek County, Colorado.
- Coordinates: 39°43′18″N 105°25′53″W
- Country: United States
- State: Colorado
- County: Clear Creek

Government
  - Type: unincorporated community
  - Body: Clear Creek County

Area
  - Total: 6.293 sq mi (16.298 km^{2})
  - Land: 6.290 sq mi (16.290 km^{2})
  - Water: 0.0031 sq mi (0.008 km^{2})
- Elevation: 9,095 ft (2,772 m)

Population (2020)
  - Total: 1,048
  - Density: 166.6/sq mi (64.33/km^{2})
- Time zone: UTC−07:00 (MST)
  - Summer (DST): UTC−06:00 (MDT)
- ZIP code: Evergreen 80439
- Area codes: 303/720/983
- GNIS CDP ID: 2583236
- FIPS code: 08-27175

Floyd Hill is an unincorporated community and a census-designated place (CDP) located in and governed by Clear Creek County, Colorado, United States. Interstate 70 passes through the community. Floyd Hill is a part of the Denver-Aurora-Centennial, CO Metropolitan Statistical Area. The population of the Floyd Hill CDP was 1,048 at the United States Census 2020.

== History ==
Floyd Hill is named after Merril H. Floyd, head of the Clear Creek Wagon Road Company that operated in the 1860s. Mr. Floyd owned a ranch on a hill in the area and the land around the hill, which became known as "Floyd's Hill", where his company built a wagon road over from Idaho Springs to Bergen's ranch.

On February 24, 1873, the Colorado Central Railroad completed a rail spur from Forks Creek 3.3 miles (5.3 km) to Floyd Hill.

The Floyd Hill, Colorado, post office operated from September 9, 1912, until June 30, 1937. The Evergreen, Colorado, post office (ZIP code 80439) now serves the area.

== Geography ==
Floyd Hill is located in eastern Clear Creek County.

At the 2020 United States Census, the Floyd Hill CDP had an area of 4,027 acres (16.298 km^{2}), including 2.0 acres (0.008 km^{2}) of water.

== Demographics ==
Floyd Hill CDP, Colorado
| Year | Pop. | ±% |
|---|---|---|
| 2010 | 998 | — |
| 2020 | 1,048 | +5.0% |
Source: United States Census Bureau

=== 2020 census ===
As of the 2020 census, Floyd Hill had a population of 1,048. The median age was 48.4 years. 15.1% of residents were under the age of 18 and 18.4% of residents were 65 years of age or older. For every 100 females there were 107.1 males, and for every 100 females age 18 and over there were 106.5 males age 18 and over.

0.0% of residents lived in urban areas, while 100.0% lived in rural areas.

There were 446 households in Floyd Hill, of which 21.1% had children under the age of 18 living in them. Of all households, 66.8% were married-couple households, 15.7% were households with a male householder and no spouse or partner present, and 11.2% were households with a female householder and no spouse or partner present. About 17.9% of all households were made up of individuals and 8.1% had someone living alone who was 65 years of age or older.

There were 503 housing units, of which 11.3% were vacant. The homeowner vacancy rate was 1.6% and the rental vacancy rate was 31.0%.

Racial composition as of the 2020 census
| Race | Number | Percent |
|---|---|---|
| White | 915 | 87.3% |
| Black or African American | 3 | 0.3% |
| American Indian and Alaska Native | 9 | 0.9% |
| Asian | 18 | 1.7% |
| Native Hawaiian and Other Pacific Islander | 0 | 0.0% |
| Some other race | 9 | 0.9% |
| Two or more races | 94 | 9.0% |
| Hispanic or Latino (of any race) | 65 | 6.2% |

=== 2010 census ===
The United States Census Bureau initially defined the Floyd Hill CDP for the United States Census 2010.

== See also ==
- Front Range Urban Corridor
