= Upper Bear Creek, Colorado =

Census-designated place in Clear Creek County, CO, USA

- Census-designated place
- Location of the Upper Bear Creek CDP in Clear Creek County, Colorado
- Coordinates: 39°37′38″N 105°25′12″W
- Country: United States
- State: Colorado
- County: Clear Creek County

Government
  - Type: Unincorporated community

Area
  - Total: 3.791 sq mi (9.819 km^{2})
  - Land: 3.785 sq mi (9.803 km^{2})
  - Water: 0.0062 sq mi (0.016 km^{2})
- Elevation: 7,536 ft (2,297 m)

Population (2020)
  - Total: 984
  - Density: 260/sq mi (100/km^{2})
- Time zone: UTC-7 (MST)
  - Summer (DST): UTC-6 (MDT)
- ZIP Code: Evergreen 80439
- Area codes: 303 & 720
- GNIS feature ID: 2583309

Upper Bear Creek is an unincorporated community and a census-designated place (CDP) located in and governed by Clear Creek County, Colorado, United States. The CDP is a part of the Denver–Aurora–Lakewood, CO Metropolitan Statistical Area. The population of the Upper Bear Creek CDP was 984 at the United States Census 2020. The Evergreen post office (Zip Code 80439) serves the area.

== History ==
The Upper Bear Creek area is rich in history - Troutdale in the Pines, a posh resort hotel, catered to Hollywood movie stars and America's elite in the 1920s and served as a vacation spot for Denverites escaping the summer heat. Other summer resorts sprang up in the area as well, including the Greystone Guest Ranch and the Brookforest Inn.

Additionally, the Mt. Evans Outdoor Lab School, a campus of the Jefferson County Public Schools, is located in the Upper Bear Creek area. Many Jeffco 6th graders will spend a week at Mt. Evans, or the other outdoor lab school, Windy Peak, where they stay in cabins or dorms and study various aspects of the outdoors, including forestry, astronomy, ecology, and pioneer history, among others.

== Geography ==
The Upper Bear Creek CDP has an area of 2,426 acres (9.819 km^{2}), including 4.0 acres (0.016 km^{2}) of water.

=== Climate ===
Corral Creek (RAWS) and Evergreen 6.5 WSW (CoCoRaHS) are weather stations near Upper Bear Creek with temperature and precipitation/snowfall data, respectively. Corral Creek has a humid continental climate (Köppen Dfb), with long, snowy winters and warm but relatively short summers that are more characteristic of a subalpine climate (Köppen Dfc).

Climate data for Corral Creek (RAWS), Colorado, 2002–2020 normals: 8210ft (2502m)
Month	Jan	Feb	Mar	Apr	May	Jun	Jul	Aug	Sep	Oct	Nov	Dec	Year
Record high °F (°C)	65 (18)	66 (19)	73 (23)	74 (23)	84 (29)	91 (33)	90 (32)	92 (33)	89 (32)	80 (27)	71 (22)	65 (18)	92 (33)
Mean maximum °F (°C)	60.0 (15.6)	58.7 (14.8)	65.5 (18.6)	69.3 (20.7)	76.8 (24.9)	85.2 (29.6)	86.5 (30.3)	84.5 (29.2)	81.0 (27.2)	74.4 (23.6)	66.7 (19.3)	59.5 (15.3)	88.1 (31.2)
Mean daily maximum °F (°C)	42.0 (5.6)	40.6 (4.8)	47.7 (8.7)	52.3 (11.3)	60.0 (15.6)	72.4 (22.4)	77.5 (25.3)	75.2 (24.0)	69.4 (20.8)	57.8 (14.3)	49.2 (9.6)	40.8 (4.9)	57.1 (13.9)
Daily mean °F (°C)	29.6 (−1.3)	27.8 (−2.3)	34.8 (1.6)	39.5 (4.2)	46.8 (8.2)	57.4 (14.1)	63.0 (17.2)	60.8 (16.0)	54.5 (12.5)	43.8 (6.6)	35.7 (2.1)	28.1 (−2.2)	43.5 (6.4)
Mean daily minimum °F (°C)	17.1 (−8.3)	14.9 (−9.5)	21.8 (−5.7)	26.7 (−2.9)	33.6 (0.9)	42.4 (5.8)	48.5 (9.2)	46.4 (8.0)	39.6 (4.2)	29.9 (−1.2)	22.1 (−5.5)	15.3 (−9.3)	29.9 (−1.2)
Mean minimum °F (°C)	−4.9 (−20.5)	−7.2 (−21.8)	2.6 (−16.3)	11.4 (−11.4)	20.1 (−6.6)	31.7 (−0.2)	41.1 (5.1)	37.7 (3.2)	28.3 (−2.1)	13.2 (−10.4)	2.4 (−16.4)	−7.1 (−21.7)	−13.0 (−25.0)
Record low °F (°C)	−14 (−26)	−24 (−31)	−15 (−26)	−5 (−21)	10 (−12)	27 (−3)	36 (2)	33 (1)	23 (−5)	−8 (−22)	−16 (−27)	−20 (−29)	−24 (−31)
Average precipitation inches (mm)	0.75 (19)	0.91 (23)	2.02 (51)	2.67 (68)	2.73 (69)	2.02 (51)	3.35 (85)	2.73 (69)	2.01 (51)	1.39 (35)	0.92 (23)	0.73 (19)	22.23 (563)
Average snowfall inches (cm)	12.7 (32)	18.2 (46)	23.2 (59)	26.3 (67)	9.7 (25)	0.4 (1.0)	0.0 (0.0)	0.0 (0.0)	1.0 (2.5)	11.1 (28)	10.8 (27)	16.7 (42)	130.1 (329.5)
Average extreme snow depth inches (cm)	8.1 (21)	10.7 (27)	12.2 (31)	11.4 (29)	6.1 (15)	0.6 (1.5)	0.0 (0.0)	0.0 (0.0)	1.8 (4.6)	7.2 (18)	6.4 (16)	8.2 (21)	19.3 (49)
Average precipitation days (≥ 0.01 in)	7.0	9.2	8.7	10.8	12.5	10.9	15.1	14.6	9.2	8.1	5.9	7.2	119.2
Average snowy days (≥ 0.1 in)	7	9	8	8	4	0	0	0	1	4	5	7	53
Source 1: XMACIS2 (Corral Creek normals & Evergreen6.5 2003-2020 snowfall)
Source 2: NOAA (Evergreen 6.5 precip/precip days)

== Demographics ==
The United States Census Bureau initially defined the Upper Bear Creek CDP for the United States Census 2010.

Upper Bear Creek CDP, Colorado
Year	Pop.	±%
2010	1,059	—
2020	984	−7.1%
Source: United States Census Bureau

== See also ==
- Front Range Urban Corridor
