= Colorado State Highway 5 =

State highway in Colorado, United States

State Highway 5
- Mount Blue Sky Highway
- SH 5 highlighted in red

Route information
- Maintained by CDOT
- Length: 14.894 mi (23.970 km)
- Tourist routes: Mount Blue Sky Scenic Byway
- Restrictions: Closed winters

Major junctions
- North end: SH 103 at Echo Lake
- South end: Summit of Mount Blue Sky

Location
- Country: United States
- State: Colorado
- Counties: Clear Creek

Highway system
- Colorado State Highway System; Interstate; US; State; Scenic
← SH 3	→ US 6

Colorado State Highway 5 (SH 5) is a 14.89-mile-long (23.96 km) state highway in the U.S. state of Colorado that is the highest paved road in North America with its upper terminus at 14,140 feet (4,310 m) elevation near the summit of Mount Blue Sky and its lower terminus at 10,650 feet (3,246 m) elevation at State Highway 103 near Echo Lake.

== Route description ==
SH 5 is short, slightly less than 15 miles (24 km). It passes through the Mount Evans Wilderness. This particular state highway is quite unusual in that it does not pass through any cities, towns, or unincorporated communities.

The route is entirely contained within Clear Creek County. This highway forms half of the Mount Blue Sky Scenic Byway, running from the summit of Mount Blue Sky to the junction with SH 103 at Echo Lake Park, about 13 miles (21 km) south of Idaho Springs, the nearest municipality to SH 5.

Because of its mountainous route, SH 5 is closed seasonally when snow clearance becomes excessively difficult, usually from Labor Day to Memorial Day. During the warmer months the road is open 24 hours a day. A toll (or "park fee") is charged, though technically the toll is only necessary for the use of the parking lot at the summit between 8 A.M. and 6:30 P.M. As a state highway, the road is open to the public and free to traverse out and back.

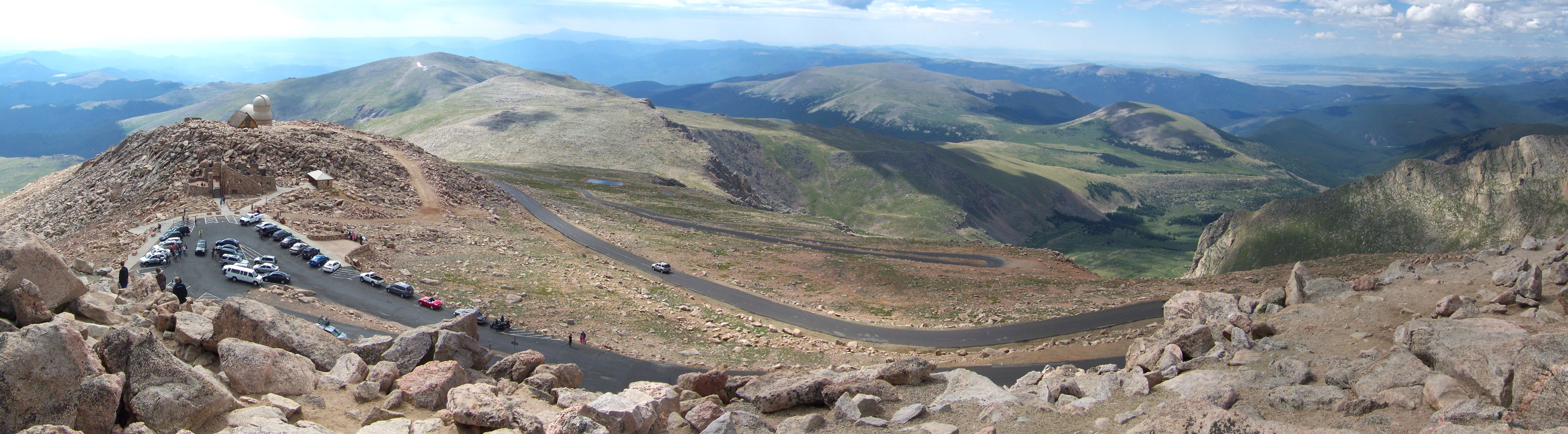
State Highway 5 from summit of Mount Blue Sky

== History ==
SH 5's current routing up to Mount Blue Sky was originally a part of SH 103; however, it was renumbered as SH 5 by year 1955.

== Major intersections ==
The entire route is in Clear Creek County.

Location	mi	km	Destinations	Notes
	0.000	0.000	Mestaa'ėhehe Road (SH 103) to I-70 – Idaho Springs, Bergen Park	Northern terminus; Mt. Blue Sky Scenic Byway continues as SH 103 north
Mount Blue Sky	14.894	23.970	Mount Blue Sky summit parking	Southern terminus
1.000 mi = 1.609 km; 1.000 km = 0.621 mi
