= Colorado statistical areas =

Coordinates: 38.9972°N 105.5478°W

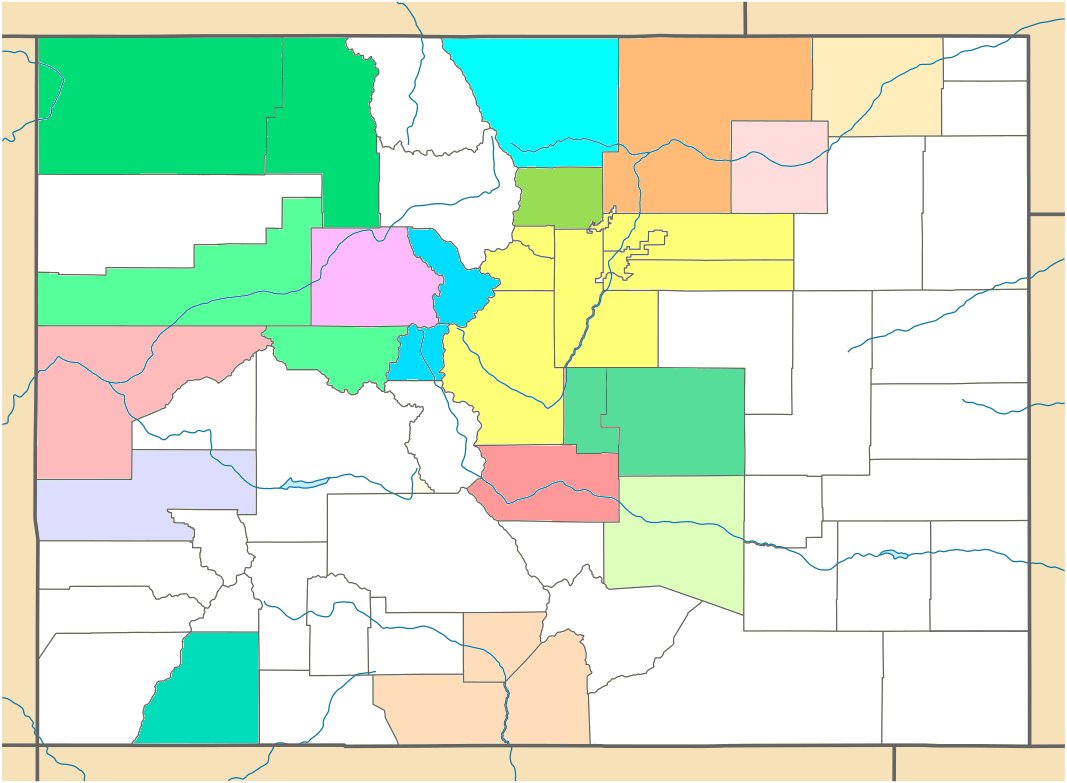

The 17 core-based statistical areas in the U.S. State of Colorado.

The U.S. State of Colorado has 20 statistical areas that have been delineated by the Office of Management and Budget (OMB). Statistical areas are important geographic delineations of population clusters used by the OMB, the United States Census Bureau, planning organizations, and federal, state, and local government entities.

On July 21, 2023, the OMB delineated three combined statistical areas, seven metropolitan statistical areas, and ten micropolitan statistical areas in Colorado. The most populous of these statistical areas is the 12-county Denver–Aurora–Greeley, CO Combined Statistical Area with a United States Census Bureau estimated population of 3,752,505 as of July 1, 2024. (Note: United States Census Bureau population estimates for July 1, 2024.)

The Denver–Aurora–Greeley, CO Combined Statistical Area, the Colorado Springs, CO Metropolitan Statistical Area, the Fort Collins–Loveland, CO Metropolitan Statistical Area, the Pueblo-Cañon City, CO Combined Statistical Area, and the Cheyenne, WY Metropolitan Statistical Area comprise what is known as the Front Range Urban Corridor.

== Statistical areas ==
The Office of Management and Budget (OMB) has designated more than 1,000 statistical areas for the United States and Puerto Rico. These statistical areas are important geographic delineations of population clusters used by the OMB, the United States Census Bureau, planning organizations, and federal, state, and local government entities.

The OMB defines a core-based statistical area (commonly referred to as a CBSA) as the county or counties (or county-equivalents) surrounding at least one densely-settled core of at least 10,000 population, "plus adjacent counties having a high degree of social and economic integration with the core as measured through commuting ties with the counties containing the core". The OMB further divides core-based statistical areas based on population into metropolitan statistical areas (MSAs) for those with at least 50,000 and micropolitan statistical areas (μSAs) for those with 10,000 to 49,999 people.

The OMB defines a combined statistical area (CSA) as two or more adjacent core-based statistical areas where the employment interchange rate (% commuting from A to B plus % commuting from B to A) is at least 15%. The primary statistical areas (PSAs) include all combined statistical areas and any core-based statistical area that is not a constituent of a combined statistical area.

== Colorado statistical areas ==
The following table contains each of the 64 Colorado counties with their statistical areas and their population as estimated by the United States Census Bureau for July 1, 2025.

The 64 counties and 20 statistical areas of the State of Colorado
64 counties		17 core-based statistical areas		3 combined statistical areas	
county	2025 population estimate	CBSA	2025 population estimate	CSA	2025 population estimate
City and County of Denver	740,613	Denver-Aurora-Centennial, CO MSA	3,092,037	Denver-Aurora-Greeley, CO CSA	3,799,023
Arapahoe County	673,820	Denver-Aurora-Centennial, CO MSA	3,092,037	Denver-Aurora-Greeley, CO CSA	3,799,023
Jefferson County	580,451	Denver-Aurora-Centennial, CO MSA	3,092,037	Denver-Aurora-Greeley, CO CSA	3,799,023
Adams County	554,668	Denver-Aurora-Centennial, CO MSA	3,092,037	Denver-Aurora-Greeley, CO CSA	3,799,023
Douglas County	399,396	Denver-Aurora-Centennial, CO MSA	3,092,037	Denver-Aurora-Greeley, CO CSA	3,799,023
City and County of Broomfield	79,174	Denver-Aurora-Centennial, CO MSA	3,092,037	Denver-Aurora-Greeley, CO CSA	3,799,023
Elbert County	30,534	Denver-Aurora-Centennial, CO MSA	3,092,037	Denver-Aurora-Greeley, CO CSA	3,799,023
Park County	18,314	Denver-Aurora-Centennial, CO MSA	3,092,037	Denver-Aurora-Greeley, CO CSA	3,799,023
Clear Creek County	8,994	Denver-Aurora-Centennial, CO MSA	3,092,037	Denver-Aurora-Greeley, CO CSA	3,799,023
Gilpin County	6,073	Denver-Aurora-Centennial, CO MSA	3,092,037	Denver-Aurora-Greeley, CO CSA	3,799,023
Weld County	378,426	Greeley, CO MSA	378,426	Denver-Aurora-Greeley, CO CSA	3,799,023
Boulder County	328,560	Boulder, CO MSA	328,560	Denver-Aurora-Greeley, CO CSA	3,799,023
El Paso County	757,040	Colorado Springs, CO MSA	781,796	none	
Teller County	24,756	Colorado Springs, CO MSA	781,796	none	
Larimer County	377,292	Fort Collins-Loveland, CO MSA	377,292	none	
Pueblo County	169,277	Pueblo, CO MSA	169,277	Pueblo-Cañon City, CO CSA	219,316
Fremont County	50,039	Cañon City, CO μSA	50,039	Pueblo-Cañon City, CO CSA	219,316
Mesa County	162,845	Grand Junction, CO MSA	162,845	none	
Garfield County	63,474	Rifle, CO μSA	80,099	Edwards-Rifle, CO CSA	134,390
Pitkin County	16,625	Rifle, CO μSA	80,099	Edwards-Rifle, CO CSA	134,390
Eagle County	54,291	Edwards, CO μSA	54,291	Edwards-Rifle, CO CSA	134,390
La Plata County	56,898	Durango, CO μSA	56,898	none	
Montrose County	44,591	Montrose, CO μSA	44,591	none	
Routt County	25,329	Steamboat Springs, CO μSA	38,451	none	
Moffat County	13,122	Steamboat Springs, CO μSA	38,451	none	
Summit County	31,517	Breckenridge, CO μSA	39,069	none	
Lake County	7,552	Breckenridge, CO μSA	39,069	none	
Morgan County	30,306	Fort Morgan, CO μSA	30,306	none	
Alamosa County	16,688	Alamosa, CO μSA	27,896	none	
Conejos County	7,529	Alamosa, CO μSA	27,896	none	
Costilla County	3,679	Alamosa, CO μSA	27,896	none	
Logan County	20,654	Sterling, CO μSA	20,654	none	
Delta County	32,178	none		none	
Montezuma County	26,678	none		none	
Chaffee County	20,831	none		none	
Otero County	17,683	none		none	
Gunnison County	17,439	none		none	
Grand County	16,496	none		none	
Las Animas County	14,391	none		none	
Archuleta County	14,306	none		none	
Prowers County	11,884	none		none	
Rio Grande County	11,087	none		none	
Yuma County	9,896	none		none	
San Miguel County	7,753	none		none	
Kit Carson County	7,069	none		none	
Huerfano County	7,011	none		none	
Saguache County	6,732	none		none	
Rio Blanco County	6,683	none		none	
Bent County	5,716	none		none	
Crowley County	5,677	none		none	
Lincoln County	5,645	none		none	
Custer County	5,590	none		none	
Ouray County	5,265	none		none	
Washington County	4,732	none		none	
Phillips County	4,420	none		none	
Baca County	3,347	none		none	
Dolores County	2,466	none		none	
Sedgwick County	2,247	none		none	
Cheyenne County	1,713	none		none	
Kiowa County	1,412	none		none	
Jackson County	1,211	none		none	
Mineral County	910	none		none	
San Juan County	813	none		none	
Hinsdale County	753	none		none	
All 64 Colorado counties	6,012,561	The 17 Colorado core-based statistical areas	5,732,527	The 3 Colorado combined statistical areas	4,152,729

== Colorado core-based statistical areas ==
The following table provides the in-state population rank of each of the 17 Colorado core-based statistical areas with their population histories.

The 17 core-based statistical areas of the State of Colorado
2025 rank	Core-based statistical area	Population						
2025 rank	Core-based statistical area	2025 estimate	Change	2020 Census	Change	2010 Census	Change	2000 Census
1	Denver-Aurora-Centennial, CO MSA	3,092,037	+4.33%	2,963,821	+16.53%	2,543,482	+16.70%	2,179,476
2	Colorado Springs, CO MSA	781,796	+3.53%	755,105	+16.96%	645,613	+20.12%	537,475
3	Greeley, CO MSA	378,426	+15.03%	328,981	+30.12%	252,825	+39.86%	180,766
4	Fort Collins-Loveland, CO MSA	377,292	+5.08%	359,066	+19.84%	299,630	+19.14%	251,494
5	Boulder, CO MSA	328,560	−0.66%	330,758	+12.29%	294,567	+9.19%	269,784
6	Pueblo, CO MSA	169,277	+0.66%	168,162	+5.72%	159,063	+12.42%	141,490
7	Grand Junction, CO MSA	162,845	+4.59%	155,703	+6.12%	146,723	+25.47%	116,939
8	Rifle, CO μSA	80,099	+1.34%	79,043	+7.49%	73,537	+25.33%	58,675
9	Durango, CO μSA	56,898	+2.26%	55,638	+8.38%	51,334	+16.78%	43,957
10	Edwards, CO μSA	54,291	−2.58%	55,731	+6.77%	52,197	+25.40%	41,623
11	Cañon City, CO μSA	50,039	+2.25%	48,939	+4.52%	46,824	+1.48%	46,140
12	Montrose, CO μSA	44,591	+4.48%	42,679	+3.40%	41,276	+23.44%	33,438
13	Steamboat Springs, CO μSA	38,451	+0.87%	38,121	+2.19%	37,304	+13.53%	32,857
14	Breckenridge, CO μSA	39,069	+1.50%	38,491	+9.03%	35,304	+12.53%	31,374
15	Fort Morgan, CO μSA	30,306	+4.10%	29,111	+3.38%	28,159	+3.63%	27,172
16	Alamosa, CO μSA	27,896	+2.05%	27,336	+0.41%	27,225	+0.74%	27,026
17	Sterling, CO μSA	20,654	−4.06%	21,528	−5.20%	22,709	+10.42%	20,566
The 17 Colorado core-based statistical areas		5,732,527	+4.26%	5,498,213	+15.56%	4,757,772	+17.76%	4,040,252

== Colorado combined statistical areas ==
The following table provides the in-state population rank of each of the three Colorado combined statistical areas with their population histories.

The three combined statistical areas of the State of Colorado
2025 rank	Combined statistical area	Population						
2025 rank	Combined statistical area	2025 estimate	Change	2020 Census	Change	2010 Census	Change	2000 Census
1	Denver-Aurora-Greeley, CO CSA	3,799,023	+4.84%	3,623,560	+17.23%	3,090,874	+17.52%	2,630,026
2	Pueblo-Cañon City, CO CSA	219,316	+1.02%	217,101	+5.45%	205,887	+9.73%	187,630
3	Edwards-Rifle, CO CSA	134,390	−0.28%	134,774	+7.19%	125,734	+25.36%	100,298
The 3 Colorado combined statistical areas		4,152,729	+4.46%	3,975,435	+16.16%	3,422,495	+17.29%	2,917,954

== See also ==
- Bibliography of Colorado
- Geography of Colorado
- History of Colorado
- Index of Colorado-related articles
- List of Colorado-related lists
  - List of counties in Colorado
    - List of Colorado counties by per capita income
    - List of Colorado counties by population
    - List of Colorado counties by socioeconomic factors
    - List of Colorado county high points
    - List of Colorado municipalities by county
    - List of Colorado populated places by county
    - List of county courthouses in Colorado
    - List of county seats in Colorado
- Outline of Colorado
