= Denver metropolitan area =

Denver–Aurora–Centennial, CO Metropolitan Statistical Area
- Metropolitan Statistical Area
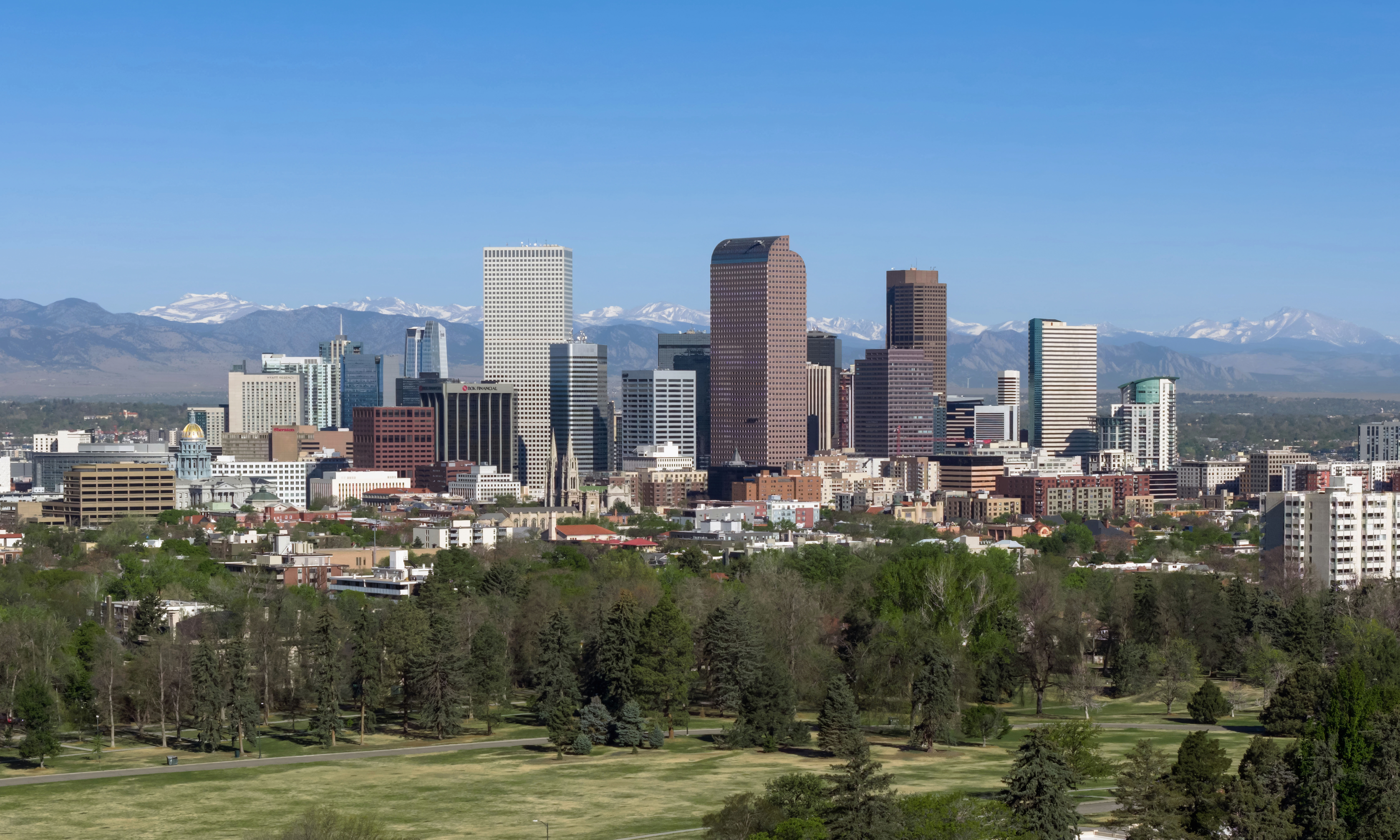
- Skyline of Downtown Denver
Denver–Aurora–Greeley, CO CSA
City and County of Denver
Denver–Aurora–Centennial MSA
Boulder MSA
Greeley MSA
- Country: United States
- State: Colorado
- Largest city: Denver
- Other principal cities: • Arvada • Aurora • Broomfield • Centennial • Lakewood • Thornton

Area
  - Total: 8,405 sq mi (21,770 km^{2})

Population (April 1, 2020)
  - Total: 2,963,821

GDP
  - Total: $311.876 billion (2023)
- Time zone: UTC−7 (MST)
  - Summer (DST): UTC−6 (MDT)

Denver is the central city of a conurbation region in the U.S. state of Colorado. The conurbation includes one continuous region consisting of the six central counties of Adams, Arapahoe, Broomfield, Denver, Douglas, and Jefferson. The Denver region is part of the Front Range Urban Corridor and its metropolitan planning organization is the Denver Regional Council of Governments. The area is also referred to as Greater Denver.

The United States Office of Management and Budget has delineated the Denver–Aurora–Centennial, CO Metropolitan Statistical Area consisting of ten Colorado counties: the City and County of Denver, Arapahoe County, Jefferson County, Adams County, Douglas County, the City and County of Broomfield, Elbert County, Park County, Clear Creek County, and Gilpin County. The population, as of the 2020 Census, is 2,963,821, an increase of 16.5% since 2010.

The Office of Management and Budget also delineated the more extensive 12-county Denver–Aurora–Greeley, CO Combined Statistical Area comprising the Denver–Aurora–Centennial Metropolitan Statistical Area, the Boulder, CO Metropolitan Statistical Area, and the Greeley, CO Metropolitan Statistical Area.

The central part of the metropolitan statistical area (MSA) includes Denver and three immediately adjacent counties: Jefferson County to the west, Adams County to the north and east, and Arapahoe County to the south and east. The continuously urbanized area extends northwest into the City and County of Broomfield, bordering Jefferson and Adams counties, and south into Douglas County, adjoining Arapahoe County. Also included in the federally defined MSA are four rural counties: Elbert County on the southeastern prairie and Clear Creek, Gilpin, and Park counties in the Rocky Mountains.

== Counties ==
The Denver–Aurora–Centennial Metropolitan Statistical Area, as defined by the Office of Management and Budget, comprises ten counties.

Denver–Aurora–Centennial, CO Metropolitan Statistical Area
County	Seat	2025 estimate	2020 Census	Change	Area	Density
Denver	Denver	740,613	715,522	+3.51%	155 sq mi (400 km^{2})	4,787/sq mi (1,848/km^{2})
Arapahoe	Littleton	673,820	655,070	+2.86%	805 sq mi (2,080 km^{2})	837/sq mi (323/km^{2})
Jefferson	Golden	580,451	582,910	−0.42%	774 sq mi (2,000 km^{2})	750/sq mi (290/km^{2})
Adams	Brighton	554,668	519,572	+6.75%	1,184 sq mi (3,070 km^{2})	468/sq mi (181/km^{2})
Douglas	Castle Rock	399,396	357,978	+11.57%	843 sq mi (2,180 km^{2})	474/sq mi (183/km^{2})
Broomfield	Broomfield	79,174	74,112	+6.83%	34 sq mi (88 km^{2})	2,360/sq mi (911/km^{2})
Elbert	Kiowa	30,534	26,062	+17.16%	1,851 sq mi (4,790 km^{2})	16/sq mi (6/km^{2})
Park	Fairplay	18,314	17,390	+5.31%	2,211 sq mi (5,730 km^{2})	8/sq mi (3/km^{2})
Clear Creek	Georgetown	8,994	9,397	−4.29%	396 sq mi (1,030 km^{2})	23/sq mi (9/km^{2})
Gilpin	Central City	6,073	5,808	+4.56%	150 sq mi (390 km^{2})	40/sq mi (16/km^{2})
Total		3,092,037	2,963,821	+4.33%	8,403 sq mi (21,760 km^{2})	368/sq mi (142/km^{2})

== Metropolitan area cities and towns ==
Historical population
Census	Pop.	Note	%±
1900	162,323		—
1910	246,767		52.0%
1920	299,087		21.2%
1930	352,563		17.9%
1940	407,768		15.7%
1950	563,832		38.3%
1960	868,953		54.1%
1970	1,116,226		28.5%
1980	1,450,768		30.0%
1990	1,650,489		13.8%
2000	2,157,756		30.7%
2010	2,543,482		17.9%
2020	2,963,821		16.5%
2025 (est.)	3,092,037		4.3%
data source:

The following are cities and towns categorized based on the United States Census Bureau 2025 population estimates. No population estimates are released for census-designated places (CDPs), which are marked with an asterisk (*). These places are categorized based on their 2020 Census population. Places designated "principal cities" by the U.S. Office of Management and Budget are italicized.

=== Places with over 100,000 inhabitants ===
- Denver (740,613)
- Aurora (410,053)
- Lakewood (156,927)
- Thornton (147,766)
- Arvada (122,901)
- Westminster (116,182)
- Centennial (108,658)
- Highlands Ranch* (105,631)

=== Places with 10,000 to 100,000 inhabitants ===
- Castle Rock (83,815)
- Broomfield (79,174)
- Commerce City (72,345)
- Parker (65,985)
- Littleton (46,246)
- Brighton (partial) (45,395)
- Northglenn (partial) (38,893)
- Englewood (35,305)
- Dakota Ridge* (33,892)
- Ken Caryl* (33,811)
- Wheat Ridge (32,081)
- Columbine* (25,229)
- Four Square Mile* (22,872)
- Golden (20,390)
- Sherrelwood* (19,228)
- Castle Pines (15,583)
- Welby* (15,553)
- Greenwood Village (15,323)
- Lone Tree (15,278)
- Federal Heights (14,075)
- Superior (partial) (13,637)
- Berkley* (12,536)
- Cherry Creek* (11,488)
- The Pinery* (11,311)

=== Places with fewer than 10,000 inhabitants ===
- Roxborough Park* (9,416)
- Fairmount* (9,324)
- Evergreen* (9,307)
- Stonegate* (9,072)
- Lochbuie (partial) (8,776)
- Derby* (8,407)
- Twin Lakes* (8,226)
- Applewood* (7,833)
- Cherry Hills Village (6,389)
- Sheridan (5,972)
- Dove Valley* (5,640)
- Shaw Heights* (5,185)
- Todd Creek* (5,028)
- Edgewater (4,870)
- Meridian* (4,786)
- Glendale (4,475)
- Castle Pines Village* (4,327)
- West Pleasant View* (4,327)
- Bennett (4,224)
- Genesee* (3,610)
- Sierra Ridge* (3,490)
- Ponderosa Park* (3,334)
- Strasburg* (3,307)
- Meridian Village* (3,202)
- Elizabeth (2,957)
- Acres Green* (2,922)
- Stepping Stone* (2,780)
- Holly Hills* (2,683)
- Coal Creek* (partial) (2,494)
- Inverness* (2,226)
- Perry Park* (1,932)
- Idaho Springs (1,842)
- Sterling Ranch* (1,789)
- Deer Trail (1,755)
- Columbine Valley (1,684)
- Aetna Estates* (1,496)
- Indian Hills* (1,474)
- Byers* (1,322)
- Kittredge* (1,308)
- Georgetown (1,217)
- Floyd Hill* (1,048)
- Upper Bear Creek* (984)
- Bow Mar (832)
- Aspen Park* (810)
- Central City (807)
- Foxfield (746)
- Fairplay (743)
- Kiowa (738)
- North Washington* (733)
- Grand View Estates* (689)
- Watkins* (682)
- Brook Forest* (622)
- Simla (587)
- Downieville-Lawson-Dumont* (527)
- Mountain View (517)
- Comanche Creek* (442)
- Franktown* (409)
- Morrison (364)
- Pine Valley* (363)
- Upper Witter Gulch* (347)
- East Pleasant View* (333)
- St. Mary's* (333)
- Empire (317)
- Echo Hills* (313)
- Alma (312)
- Louviers* (293)
- Idledale* (244)
- Larkspur (219)
- Rollinsville* (194)
- Elbert* (188)
- Silver Plume (180)
- Sedalia* (177)
- Blue Valley* (173)
- Peoria* (153)
- Black Hawk (120)
- Westcreek* (120)
- Guffey* (111)
- Brick Center* (105)
- Matheson* (79)
- Hartsel* (38)
- Lakeside (16)

=== Communities previously part of the Denver metro area ===
==== Now part of the Boulder metropolitan area ====
- Boulder
- Longmont
- Lafayette
- Louisville
- Superior

==== Now part of the Greeley metropolitan area ====
- Dacono
- Firestone
- Fort Lupton
- Frederick

== Regional cooperation ==
The Denver Regional Council of Governments (DRCOG, pronounced Doctor Cog) is a regional planning and inter-governmental coordination organization in a nine-county region. The Scientific and Cultural Facilities District (SCFD) provides funding for scientific and cultural facilities in a seven-county region including:

- The Denver Museum of Nature and Science
- The Denver Zoo
- The Denver Art Museum
- The Denver Center for the Performing Arts
- The Denver Botanic Gardens

In addition, the Regional Transportation District (RTD) provides mass transit, including a light rail system. In 2005 the RTD developed a twelve-year comprehensive plan, called "FasTracks", to build and operate rail transit lines and expand and improve bus service throughout the region.

== Economy ==
The most prosperous parts of the area are in the south and the northwest, while the most industrialized areas are in the northeast, specifically in the northern part of Denver proper and extending to areas such as Commerce City in Adams County.

Changes in house prices for the area are publicly tracked on a regular basis using the Case-Shiller index; the statistic is published by Standard & Poor's and is also a component of S&P's 10-city composite index of the value of the residential real estate market. The Denver MSA is also home to one of the fastest growing tech scenes outside of Silicon Valley in the country.

Electricity is provided by Xcel Energy. Cable television is provided by Comcast.

== Sports ==
The following table shows sports teams in the Denver metropolitan area that average more than 12,000 fans per game:

Club	Sport	League	Venue	City	Capacity	Attendance	Since	Titles
Denver Broncos	Football	NFL	Empower Field at Mile High	Denver	76,125	76,939	1960	3 (1997, 1998, 2015)
Colorado Rockies	Baseball	MLB	Coors Field	Denver	50,398	31,334	1993	0
Colorado Avalanche	Ice hockey	NHL	Ball Arena	Denver	18,007	16,176	1995	3 (1996, 2001, 2022
Colorado Rapids	Soccer	MLS	Dick's Sporting Goods Park	Commerce City	18,061	15,657	1996	1 (2010)
Denver Nuggets	Basketball	NBA	Ball Arena	Denver	19,115	14,700	1967	1 (2023)
Colorado Mammoth	Box Lacrosse	NLL	Ball Arena	Denver	18,007	14,077	2003	2 (2006, 2022)

== Air quality ==
The center of the metropolitan area sits in a valley, the Denver Basin, and suffers from air pollution known colloquially as the brown cloud, building up if the air is stagnant as it often is in the winter. Severity of pollution in this area has varied enormously over the years. In the late 1980s the area was frequently in violation of multiple National Ambient Air Quality Standards established by the United States Environmental Protection Agency (EPA). The Regional Air Quality Council (RAQC) was formed in 1989 to create plans to address the problem. Through a variety of measures the area's air quality was improved and in 2002 the EPA designated the area in compliance with all federal health-based air quality standards. Denver was the first major city in the United States to reach compliance with all six of these standards after previously violating five of them. Since then the EPA introduced a new standard for small particulates and made the existing ozone standard stricter. In 2003, the new ozone standard was frequently exceeded in the area and was occasionally exceeded as far away as Rocky Mountain National Park. The RAQC hopes to implement plans enabling the area to comply with the new standards by 2007.

== Sister cities ==
Though Aurora, Brighton, Broomfield, Denver, Lakewood, and Longmont have their own individual sister city relationships, the Denver Regional Council of Governments (DRCOG) as a whole has a sister city relationship with the Baghdad Governorate of Iraq.

== See also ==
- Colorado
  - Outline of Colorado
    - Index of Colorado-related articles
  - List of places in Colorado
    - List of cities and towns in Colorado
    - List of census-designated places in Colorado
  - List of counties in Colorado
  - Colorado statistical areas
    - Front Range Urban Corridor
    - North Central Colorado Urban Area
    - Denver–Aurora, CO Combined Statistical Area
- Regional Transportation District
