= Comanche Creek, Colorado =

Unincorporated community in Colorado, US

- Census-designated place
- Location of the Comanche Creek CDP in Arapahoe County, Colorado
- Coordinates: 39°37′40″N 104°19′32″W
- Country: United States
- State: Colorado
- County: Arapahoe

Government
  - Type: unincorporated community
  - Body: Arapahoe County

Area
  - Total: 21.768 sq mi (56.380 km^{2})
  - Land: 21.692 sq mi (56.183 km^{2})
  - Water: 0.076 sq mi (0.197 km^{2})
- Elevation: 5,627 ft (1,715 m)

Population (2020)
  - Total: 442
  - Density: 20.4/sq mi (7.87/km^{2})
- Time zone: UTC−07:00 (MST)
  - Summer (DST): UTC−06:00 (MDT)
- ZIP code: Strasburg 80136
- Area codes: 303/720/983
- GNIS CDP ID: 2583225
- FIPS code: 08-16465

Comanche Creek is an unincorporated community and a census-designated place (CDP) located in and governed by Arapahoe County, Colorado, United States. The CDP is a part of the Denver–Aurora–Lakewood, CO Metropolitan Statistical Area. The population of the Comanche Creek CDP was 442 at the United States Census 2020. The Strasburg post office (Zip code 80136) serves the area.

== Geography ==
At the 2020 United States Census, the Comanche Creek CDP had an area of 13,932 acres (56.380 km^{2}), including 49 acres (0.197 km^{2}) of water.

== Demographics ==
The United States Census Bureau initially defined the Comanche Creek CDP for the United States Census 2010.

Comanche Creek CDP, Colorado
Year	Pop.	±%
2010	369	—
2020	442	+19.8%
Source: United States Census Bureau

== See also ==
- Front Range Urban Corridor
