= Graduate School of Banking at Colorado =

Banking school in Westminster, Colorado

Coordinates: 39.8966°N 105.1217°W

Graduate School of Banking at Colorado is a banking school in Westminster, Colorado. It provides courses tailored to banking, including industry leadership.

The school was formed in 1950. The school provides professional development programs in banking at the Leeds School of Business at the University of Colorado Boulder.
