= Todd Creek, Colorado =

Census-designated place in Adams County, CO, USA

- Census-designated place
- Location of the Todd Creek CDP in Adams County, Colorado
- Coordinates: 39°59′36″N 104°53′03″W
- Country: United States
- State: Colorado
- County: Adams County

Government
  - Type: unincorporated community

Area
  - Total: 9.889 sq mi (25.612 km^{2})
  - Land: 9.694 sq mi (25.108 km^{2})
  - Water: 0.195 sq mi (0.504 km^{2})
- Elevation: 5,036 ft (1,535 m)

Population (2020)
  - Total: 5,028
  - Density: 518.7/sq mi (200.3/km^{2})
- Time zone: UTC-7 (MST)
  - Summer (DST): UTC-6 (MDT)
- ZIP Code: 80602
- Area codes: 303 & 720
- GNIS feature: 2409327

Todd Creek (also known as Todd Creek Village) is an unincorporated community and a census-designated place (CDP) located in and governed by Adams County, Colorado, United States. The CDP is a part of the Denver–Aurora–Lakewood, CO Metropolitan Statistical Area. The population of the Todd Creek CDP was 5,028 at the United States Census 2020. The Todd Creek Village Metropolitan District and the Todd Creek Village Park and Recreation District provide services to the community, which lies in ZIP Code 80602.

== Geography ==
The Todd Creek CDP has an area of 6,329 acres (25.612 km^{2}), including 125 acres (0.504 km^{2}) of water.

== Demographics ==
The United States Census Bureau initially defined the Todd Creek CDP for the United States Census 2000.

Todd Creek CDP, Colorado
Year	Pop.	±%
2000	1,299	—
2010	3,768	+190.1%
2020	5,028	+33.4%
Source: United States Census Bureau

=== 2020 census ===
As of the 2020 census, Todd Creek had a population of 5,028. The median age was 45.1 years. 22.9% of residents were under the age of 18 and 13.9% of residents were 65 years of age or older. For every 100 females there were 102.6 males, and for every 100 females age 18 and over there were 100.8 males age 18 and over.

56.2% of residents lived in urban areas, while 43.8% lived in rural areas.

There were 1,648 households in Todd Creek, of which 36.5% had children under the age of 18 living in them. Of all households, 81.3% were married-couple households, 7.8% were households with a male householder and no spouse or partner present, and 7.0% were households with a female householder and no spouse or partner present. About 6.1% of all households were made up of individuals and 2.1% had someone living alone who was 65 years of age or older.

There were 1,683 housing units, of which 2.1% were vacant. The homeowner vacancy rate was 0.3% and the rental vacancy rate was 9.1%.

Racial composition as of the 2020 census
Race	Number	Percent
White	4,009	79.7%
Black or African American	40	0.8%
American Indian and Alaska Native	43	0.9%
Asian	151	3.0%
Native Hawaiian and Other Pacific Islander	4	0.1%
Some other race	177	3.5%
Two or more races	604	12.0%
Hispanic or Latino (of any race)	777	15.5%

== See also ==
- Front Range Urban Corridor
