= Brick Center, Colorado =

Census-designated place in Arapahoe County, Colorado, United States

- census-designated place
- Location of the Brick Center CDP in Arapahoe County, Colorado
- Coordinates: 39°36′00″N 104°27′29″W
- Country: United States
- State: Colorado
- County: Arapahoe

Government
  - Type: unincorporated community
  - Body: Arapahoe County

Area
  - Total: 5.798 sq mi (15.016 km^{2})
  - Land: 5.778 sq mi (14.964 km^{2})
  - Water: 0.020 sq mi (0.052 km^{2})
- Elevation: 5,824 ft (1,775 m)

Population (2020)
  - Total: 105
  - Density: 18.2/sq mi (7.02/km^{2})
- Time zone: UTC−07:00 (MST)
  - Summer (DST): UTC−06:00 (MDT)
- ZIP code: Bennett 80102
- Area codes: 303/720/983
- GNIS CDP ID: 2583216
- FIPS code: 08-08530

Brick Center is an unincorporated community and a census-designated place (CDP) located in Arapahoe County, Colorado, United States. The CDP is a part of the Denver–Aurora–Lakewood, CO Metropolitan Statistical Area. The population of the Brick Center CDP was 105 at the United States Census 2020. Brick Center has never had its own post office. The Bennett post office (Zip code 80102) serves the area.

== Geography ==
At the 2020 United States Census, the Brick Center CDP had an area of 3,711 acres (15.016 km^{2}), including 13 acres (0.052 km^{2}) of water.

== Demographics ==
The United States Census Bureau initially defined the Brick Center CDP for the |United States Census 2010.

Brick Center CDP, Colorado
Year	Pop.	±%
2010	107	—
2020	105	−1.9%
Source: United States Census Bureau

== See also ==
- Front Range Urban Corridor
