= Clear Creek County, Colorado =

County in Colorado, United States

- County
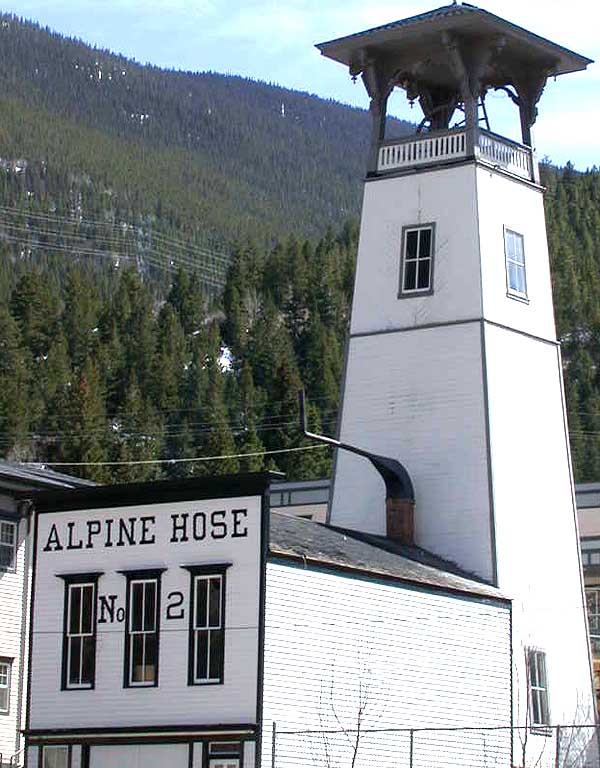
- Alpine Hose, historic firehouse in Georgetown.
- Motto: Where The Old West Meets New Adventures
- Location within the U.S. state of Colorado
- Coordinates: 39.69°N 105.64°W
- Country: United States
- State: Colorado
- Founded: November 1, 1861
- Named for: Clear Creek
- Seat: Georgetown
- Largest city: Idaho Springs

Area
  - Total: 396 sq mi (1,030 km^{2})
  - Land: 395 sq mi (1,020 km^{2})
  - Water: 1.3 sq mi (3.4 km^{2}) 0.3%

Population (2020)
  - Total: 9,397
  - Estimate (2025): 8,994 ▼
  - Density: 23.8/sq mi (9.19/km^{2})
- Time zone: UTC−7 (Mountain)
  - Summer (DST): UTC−6 (MDT)
- Congressional district: 2nd
- Website: www.clearcreekcounty.us

Clear Creek County is a county located in the U.S. state of Colorado. As of the 2020 census, the population was 9,397. The county seat is Georgetown.

== History ==
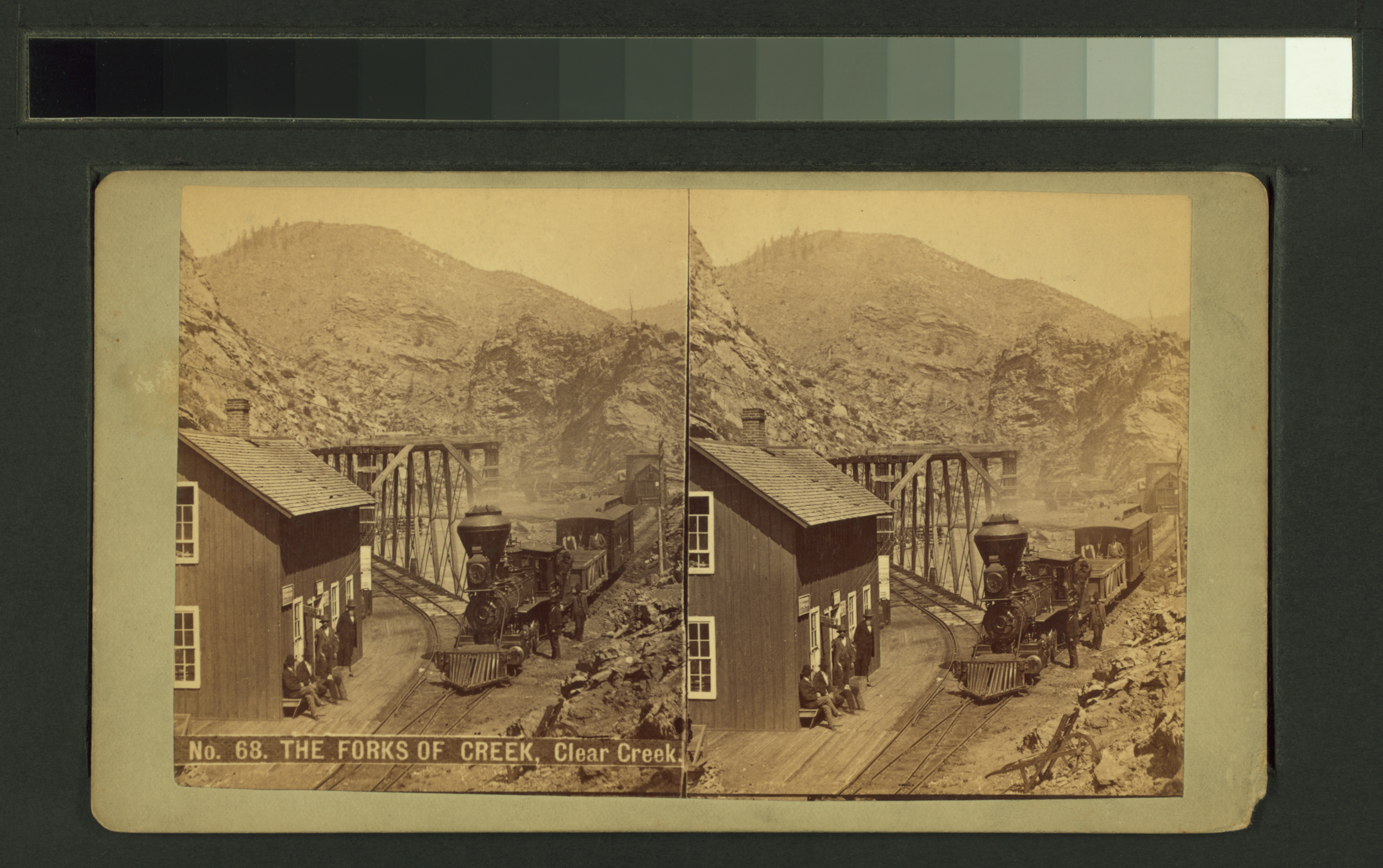
Clear Creek, ca. 1870

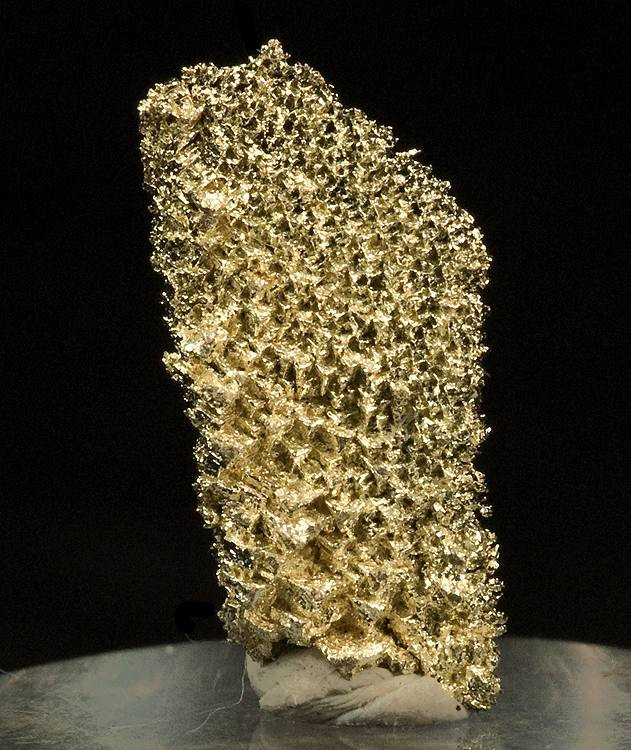
Crystalline gold specimen from the Dixie mine, Lamartine District, SW of Idaho Springs, Colorado. Size: 1.8 x 0.9 x 0.2 cm.

Clear Creek County was one of the original 17 counties created by the Colorado legislature on November 1, 1861, and is one of only two counties (along with Gilpin) to have persisted with its original boundaries unchanged. It was named after Clear Creek, which runs down from the continental divide through the county. Idaho Springs was originally designated the county seat, but the county government was moved to Georgetown in 1867.

== Geography ==
According to the U.S. Census Bureau, the county has a total area of 396 square miles (1,030 km^{2}), of which 395 square miles (1,020 km^{2}) is land and 1.3 square miles (3.4 km^{2}) (0.3%) is water.

=== Adjacent counties ===
- Jefferson - east
- Gilpin - northeast
- Park - south
- Summit - west
- Grand - northwest

=== Major highways ===
- Interstate 70
  - I-70 BS(Idaho Springs)
- U.S. Highway 6
- U.S. Highway 40
- State Highway 5
- State Highway 103
- CR 103
- Central City Parkway

=== National protected areas ===
- Pike National Forest
- Roosevelt National Forest
- James Peak Wilderness
- Mount Evans Wilderness

=== Scenic trails and byways ===
- American Discovery Trail
- Continental Divide National Scenic Trail
- Grays Peak National Recreation Trail
- Mount Evans National Recreation Trail
- Guanella Pass Scenic Byway
- Mount Blue Sky Scenic Byway

== Demographics ==
Historical population
Census	Pop.	Note	%±
1870	1,596		—
1880	7,823		390.2%
1890	7,184		−8.2%
1900	7,082		−1.4%
1910	5,001		−29.4%
1920	2,891		−42.2%
1930	2,155		−25.5%
1940	3,784		75.6%
1950	3,289		−13.1%
1960	2,793		−15.1%
1970	4,819		72.5%
1980	7,308		51.6%
1990	7,619		4.3%
2000	9,322		22.4%
2010	9,088		−2.5%
2020	9,397		3.4%
2025 (est.)	8,994	▼	−4.3%
U.S. Decennial Census; 1790-1960 1900-1990; 1990-2000 2010-2020

=== 2020 census ===
As of the 2020 census, the county had a population of 9,397. Of the residents, 14.7% were under the age of 18 and 21.2% were 65 years of age or older; the median age was 48.3 years. For every 100 females there were 113.5 males, and for every 100 females age 18 and over there were 113.0 males. 0.0% of residents lived in urban areas and 100.0% lived in rural areas.

Clear Creek County, Colorado – Racial and ethnic composition Note: the US Census treats Hispanic/Latino as an ethnic category. This table excludes Latinos from the racial categories and assigns them to a separate category. Hispanics/Latinos may be of any race.
Race / Ethnicity (NH = Non-Hispanic)	Pop 2000	Pop 2010	Pop 2020	% 2000	% 2010	% 2020
White alone (NH)	8,759	8,371	8,149	93.96%	92.11%	86.72%
Black or African American alone (NH)	26	50	49	0.28%	0.55%	0.52%
Native American or Alaska Native alone (NH)	46	56	41	0.49%	0.62%	0.44%
Asian alone (NH)	33	51	82	0.35%	0.56%	0.87%
Pacific Islander alone (NH)	3	3	7	0.03%	0.03%	0.07%
Other race alone (NH)	11	11	38	0.12%	0.12%	0.40%
Mixed race or Multiracial (NH)	83	117	383	0.89%	1.29%	4.08%
Hispanic or Latino (any race)	361	429	648	3.87%	4.72%	6.90%
Total	9,322	9,088	9,397	100.00%	100.00%	100.00%

The racial makeup of the county was 88.6% White, 0.6% Black or African American, 0.8% American Indian and Alaska Native, 0.9% Asian, 0.1% Native Hawaiian and Pacific Islander, 1.7% from some other race, and 7.4% from two or more races. Hispanic or Latino residents of any race comprised 6.9% of the population.

There were 4,391 households in the county, of which 20.9% had children under the age of 18 living with them and 19.2% had a female householder with no spouse or partner present. About 31.7% of all households were made up of individuals and 11.6% had someone living alone who was 65 years of age or older.

There were 5,672 housing units, of which 22.6% were vacant. Among occupied housing units, 75.2% were owner-occupied and 24.8% were renter-occupied. The homeowner vacancy rate was 1.5% and the rental vacancy rate was 6.6%.

=== 2000 census ===
At the 2000 census there were 9,322 people, 4,019 households, and 2,608 families living in the county. The population density was 24 people per square mile (9.3 people/km^{2}). There were 5,128 housing units at an average density of 13 units per square mile (5.0 units/km^{2}). The racial makeup of the county was 96.37% White, 0.28% Black or African American, 0.73% Native American, 0.36% Asian, 0.03% Pacific Islander, 1.02% from other races, and 1.20% from two or more races. 3.87% of the population were Hispanic or Latino of any race. Of the 4,019 households 28.20% had children under the age of 18 living with them, 54.60% were married couples living together, 6.90% had a female householder with no husband present, and 35.10% were non-families. 27.20% of households were one person and 4.30% were one person aged 65 or older. The average household size was 2.31 and the average family size was 2.81.

The age distribution was 22.60% under the age of 18, 5.60% from 18 to 24, 32.60% from 25 to 44, 32.20% from 45 to 64, and 7.10% 65 or older. The median age was 40 years. For every 100 females, there were 108.80 males. For every 100 females age 18 and over, there were 110.20 males.

The median household income was $50,997 and the median family income was $61,400. Males had a median income of $41,667 versus $30,757 for females. The per capita income for the county was $28,160. About 3.00% of families and 5.40% of the population were below the poverty line, including 6.80% of those under age 18 and 5.60% of those age 65 or over

== Communities ==
=== City ===
- Central City (partially)
- Idaho Springs

=== Towns ===
- Empire
- Georgetown
- Silver Plume

=== Census-designated places ===
- Blue Valley
- Brook Forest (partially)
- Downieville-Lawson-Dumont
- Echo Hills
- Floyd Hill
- Pine Valley
- St. Mary's
- Upper Bear Creek
- Upper Witter Gulch

=== Ghost towns ===
- Bakerville
- Silver Creek

== Politics ==
Throughout its history, Clear Creek County tended to be somewhat divided between Republicans and Democrats, but has reliably voted Democratic in recent elections, with George W. Bush having been the most recent Republican to win the county, in 2000, while his father, George H. W. Bush, was the last Republican to win the narrow majority of the county's votes, in 1988. In 2008, Barack Obama won the county with the best performance by a Democrat since 1964. During the 2016 presidential election, Hillary Clinton became the first Democrat since her husband in 1996 to not win the majority of the county's vote, while still winning the county by a plurality. Since then, the county has decisively swung further into the Democratic column, and in 2024 it saw a continued leftward shift, opposite of the national average.

United States presidential election results for Clear Creek County, Colorado
Year	Republican		Democratic		Third party(ies)	
Year	No.	%	No.	%	No.	%
1880	1,567	60.02%	961	36.81%	83	3.18%
1884	1,399	59.36%	915	38.82%	43	1.82%
1888	1,244	60.62%	696	33.92%	112	5.46%
1892	494	22.10%	0	0.00%	1,741	77.90%
1896	101	2.92%	3,345	96.84%	8	0.23%
1900	761	24.38%	2,309	73.96%	52	1.67%
1904	1,691	56.22%	1,252	41.62%	65	2.16%
1908	872	33.44%	1,702	65.26%	34	1.30%
1912	469	23.83%	1,166	59.25%	333	16.92%
1916	474	26.35%	1,289	71.65%	36	2.00%
1920	765	58.31%	518	39.48%	29	2.21%
1924	722	61.87%	284	24.34%	161	13.80%
1928	790	61.05%	481	37.17%	23	1.78%
1932	597	38.17%	939	60.04%	28	1.79%
1936	720	34.68%	1,340	64.55%	16	0.77%
1940	1,018	44.15%	1,281	55.55%	7	0.30%
1944	795	55.29%	636	44.23%	7	0.49%
1948	810	48.68%	836	50.24%	18	1.08%
1952	1,145	67.71%	540	31.93%	6	0.35%
1956	973	64.87%	520	34.67%	7	0.47%
1960	964	58.35%	688	41.65%	0	0.00%
1964	676	38.26%	1,086	61.46%	5	0.28%
1968	1,011	52.71%	719	37.49%	188	9.80%
1972	1,557	62.23%	815	32.57%	130	5.20%
1976	1,477	55.36%	1,069	40.07%	122	4.57%
1980	1,784	56.22%	837	26.38%	552	17.40%
1984	2,151	65.34%	1,089	33.08%	52	1.58%
1988	1,820	50.11%	1,698	46.75%	114	3.14%
1992	1,356	30.40%	1,744	39.10%	1,360	30.49%
1996	1,746	41.97%	1,863	44.78%	551	13.25%
2000	2,247	45.63%	2,188	44.44%	489	9.93%
2004	2,522	44.93%	2,989	53.25%	102	1.82%
2008	2,300	39.88%	3,332	57.78%	135	2.34%
2012	2,430	42.31%	3,119	54.31%	194	3.38%
2016	2,575	43.90%	2,729	46.52%	562	9.58%
2020	2,754	42.06%	3,604	55.04%	190	2.90%
2024	2,452	40.18%	3,464	56.77%	186	3.05%

United States Senate election results for Clear Creek County, Colorado2
Year	Republican		Democratic		Third party(ies)	
Year	No.	%	No.	%	No.	%
2020	2,835	43.77%	3,494	53.94%	148	2.29%

United States Senate election results for Clear Creek County, Colorado3
Year	Republican		Democratic		Third party(ies)	
Year	No.	%	No.	%	No.	%
2022	2,040	39.37%	2,966	57.25%	175	3.38%

Colorado Gubernatorial election results for Clear Creek County
Year	Republican		Democratic		Third party(ies)	
Year	No.	%	No.	%	No.	%
2022	1,919	37.05%	3,118	60.19%	143	2.76%

== Education ==
The county is served by Clear Creek School District RE-1.

=== Elementary Schools ===
- Carlson Elementary School (Idaho Springs)
- King-Murphy Mountain School (Evergreen)

=== Middle School ===
- Clear Creek Middle School (Idaho Springs)

=== High School ===
- Clear Creek High School (Evergreen)

=== Charter School ===
- Georgetown Community School (Georgetown)

== Historic areas ==
- Georgetown Loop Historic Mining & Railroad Park
- Georgetown–Silver Plume National Historic District

== Ski areas ==
- Echo Mountain
- Loveland
- Otter Mountain

== See also ==
- Bibliography of Colorado
- Geography of Colorado
- History of Colorado
  - Arapahoe County, Kansas Territory
  - Mountain County, Jefferson Territory
  - National Register of Historic Places listings in Clear Creek County, Colorado
- Index of Colorado-related articles
- List of Colorado-related lists
  - List of counties in Colorado
  - List of statistical areas in Colorado
- Outline of Colorado
  - Front Range Urban Corridor
