= List of census-designated places in Colorado =

The location of the State of Colorado in the United States of America.

The 64 counties of the U.S. State of Colorado.

The U.S. State of Colorado has 210 census-designated places. The United States Census Bureau defines certain unincorporated communities as census-designated places (CDPs) for enumeration in each decennial census. The Census Bureau defined 187 CDPs in Colorado for the 2010 Census and 210 CDPs for the 2020 Census. Five former Colorado CDPs no longer exist: Carriage Club and Heritage Hills (now incorporated within the City of Lone Tree), Castlewood and Southglenn (now incorporated within the City of Centennial), and Keystone (now incorporated as the Town of Keystone).

At the 2020 United States Census, 714,417 of the 5,773,714 Colorado residents (12.37%) lived in one of these 210 census-designated places. Another 4,299,942 residents (74.47%) lived in one of the 272 municipalities of the state, while the remaining 759,355 residents (13.15%) lived in the many rural and mountainous regions of the state.

Colorado CDPs range in population from Highlands Ranch with a 2020 population of 103,444, to Fulford which lost both of its year-round residents before the 2020 Census. Black Forest is the most extensive CDP with 101 square miles (261 km^{2}) of land area, while Blue Sky is the least extensive with 23 acres (0.093 km^{2}) of land area. Orchard Mesa was the most densely populated with a 2020 population density of 41,840 residents per square mile (16,155/km^{2}), while Cathedral was the lease densely populated of the populated CDPs with 0.70 resident per square mile (0.27/km^{2}).

Five Colorado CDPs extend into more than one county: Brook Forest, Coal Creek, Columbine, Strasburg, and Watkins.

The Town of Keystone in the Keystone, CO CDP incorporated on February 8, 2024.

== Census-designated places ==
†	County seat
‡	Former county seat

The 210 census-designated places in the State of Colorado
Census-designated place	County	Population			2020 land area	2020 population density (Note: The population density per land area at the 2020 Census.)	2020 map	Coordinates
Census-designated place	County	2020 Census	2010 Census	Change	2020 land area	2020 population density	2020 map	Coordinates
Acres Green	Douglas	2,922	3,007	−2.83%	0.601 sq mi 1.557 km^{2}	4,861/sq mi 1,877/km^{2}	map	39.5557°N 104.8958°W
Aetna Estates	Arapahoe	1,496	834	+79.38%	0.131 sq mi 0.339 km^{2}	11,430/sq mi 4,413/km^{2}	map	39.7381°N 104.6732°W
Air Force Academy	El Paso	6,608	6,680	−1.08%	9.989 sq mi 25.873 km^{2}	661/sq mi 255/km^{2}	map	38.9942°N 104.8639°W
Alamosa East	Alamosa	1,453	1,458	−0.34%	3.249 sq mi 8.414 km^{2}	447/sq mi 173/km^{2}	map	37.4767°N 105.8397°W
Allenspark	Boulder	568	528	+7.58%	11.927 sq mi 30.891 km^{2}	47.6/sq mi 18.4/km^{2}	map	40.2098°N 105.5112°W
Alpine	Rio Grande	169	174	−2.87%	1.051 sq mi 2.721 km^{2}	160.9/sq mi 62.1/km^{2}	map	37.6878°N 106.5861°W
Altona	Boulder	512	501	+2.20%	1.686 sq mi 4.366 km^{2}	304/sq mi 117/km^{2}	map	40.1254°N 105.2924°W
Amherst	Phillips	47	58	−18.97%	0.454 sq mi 1.176 km^{2}	103.5/sq mi 40.0/km^{2}	map	40.6832°N 102.1726°W
Applewood	Jefferson	7,833	7,160	+9.40%	4.064 sq mi 10.527 km^{2}	1,927/sq mi 744/km^{2}	map	39.7524°N 105.1605°W
Arapahoe	Cheyenne	102	NA	NA	0.277 sq mi 0.718 km^{2}	368/sq mi 142/km^{2}	map	38.8529°N 102.1789°W
Arboles	Archuleta	308	280	+10.00%	5.155 sq mi 13.352 km^{2}	59.7/sq mi 23.1/km^{2}	map	37.0202°N 107.4221°W
Aristocrat Ranchettes	Weld	1,715	1,344	+27.60%	1.867 sq mi 4.835 km^{2}	919/sq mi 355/km^{2}	map	40.1096°N 104.7549°W
Aspen Park	Jefferson	810	882	−8.16%	2.486 sq mi 6.438 km^{2}	326/sq mi 126/km^{2}	map	39.5423°N 105.2968°W
Atwood	Logan	138	133	+3.76%	1.034 sq mi 2.678 km^{2}	133.5/sq mi 51.5/km^{2}	map	40.5505°N 103.2746°W
Avondale	Pueblo	594	674	−11.87%	0.628 sq mi 1.627 km^{2}	946/sq mi 365/km^{2}	map	38.2352°N 104.3482°W
Bark Ranch	Boulder	202	213	−5.16%	0.862 sq mi 2.232 km^{2}	234.4/sq mi 90.5/km^{2}	map	40.1156°N 105.4417°W
Battlement Mesa	Garfield	5,438	4,471	+21.63%	11.459 sq mi 29.678 km^{2}	475/sq mi 183/km^{2}	map	39.4505°N 108.0064°W
Berkley	Adams	12,536	11,207	+11.86%	3.600 sq mi 9.323 km^{2}	3,483/sq mi 1,345/km^{2}	map	39.8045°N 105.0281°W
Beulah Valley	Pueblo	518	556	−6.83%	2.572 sq mi 6.660 km^{2}	201.4/sq mi 77.8/km^{2}	map	38.0710°N 104.9830°W
Black Forest	El Paso	15,097	13,116	+15.10%	100.640 sq mi 260.657 km^{2}	150.0/sq mi 57.9/km^{2}	map	39.0608°N 104.6753°W
Blende	Pueblo	788	878	−10.25%	0.839 sq mi 2.172 km^{2}	940/sq mi 363/km^{2}	map	38.2470°N 104.5715°W
Blue Sky	Morgan	65	24	+170.83%	0.036 sq mi 0.093 km^{2}	1,810/sq mi 699/km^{2}	map	40.3001°N 103.8055°W
Blue Valley	Clear Creek	173	NA	NA	1.052 sq mi 2.725 km^{2}	164.4/sq mi 63.5/km^{2}	map	39.6997°N 105.4921°W
Bonanza Mountain Estates	Boulder	127	128	−0.78%	0.168 sq mi 0.436 km^{2}	754/sq mi 291/km^{2}	map	39.9769°N 105.4796°W
Brandon	Kiowa	21	21	0.00%	0.117 sq mi 0.304 km^{2}	178.9/sq mi 69.1/km^{2}	map	38.4464°N 102.4412°W
Brick Center	Arapahoe	105	107	−1.87%	5.778 sq mi 14.964 km^{2}	18.17/sq mi 7.02/km^{2}	map	39.6001°N 104.4579°W
Briggsdale	Weld	134	NA	NA	0.650 sq mi 1.683 km^{2}	206.2/sq mi 79.6/km^{2}	map	40.6360°N 104.3284°W
Brook Forest	Jefferson, Clear Creek	622	NA	NA	1.389 sq mi 3.597 km^{2}	448/sq mi 173/km^{2}	map	39.5739°N 105.3944°W
Byers	Arapahoe	1,322	1,160	+13.97%	11.450 sq mi 29.657 km^{2}	115.5/sq mi 44.6/km^{2}	map	39.7101°N 104.2189°W
Capulin	Conejos	134	200	−33.00%	0.947 sq mi 2.453 km^{2}	141.5/sq mi 54.6/km^{2}	map	37.2819°N 106.1049°W
Cascade-Chipita Park	El Paso	1,628	1,655	−1.63%	13.452 sq mi 34.841 km^{2}	121.0/sq mi 46.7/km^{2}	map	38.9433°N 105.0024°W
Castle Pines Village	Douglas	4,327	3,614	+19.73%	4.452 sq mi 11.532 km^{2}	972/sq mi 375/km^{2}	map	39.4418°N 104.8970°W
Cathedral	Hinsdale	15	14	+7.14%	21.279 sq mi 55.113 km^{2}	0.70/sq mi 0.27/km^{2}	map	38.0836°N 107.0307°W
Catherine	Garfield	235	228	+3.07%	0.858 sq mi 2.223 km^{2}	274/sq mi 106/km^{2}	map	39.4017°N 107.1329°W
Cattle Creek	Garfield	662	641	+3.28%	1.295 sq mi 3.355 km^{2}	511/sq mi 197/km^{2}	map	39.4666°N 107.2599°W
Chacra	Garfield	331	329	+0.61%	0.946 sq mi 2.450 km^{2}	350/sq mi 135/km^{2}	map	39.5770°N 107.4509°W
Cherry Creek	Arapahoe	11,488	11,120	+3.31%	1.669 sq mi 4.322 km^{2}	6,884/sq mi 2,658/km^{2}	map	39.6095°N 104.8645°W
Cimarron Hills	El Paso	19,311	16,161	+19.49%	5.939 sq mi 15.382 km^{2}	3,252/sq mi 1,255/km^{2}	map	38.8597°N 104.6996°W
Clifton	Mesa	20,413	19,889	+2.63%	6.016 sq mi 15.582 km^{2}	3,393/sq mi 1,310/km^{2}	map	39.0764°N 108.4605°W
Coal Creek (Note: The Coal Creek CDP should not be confused with the Town of Coal Creek in Fremont County.)	Jefferson, Boulder, Gilpin	2,494	2,400	+3.92%	9.389 sq mi 24.316 km^{2}	266/sq mi 103/km^{2}	map	39.9071°N 105.3799°W
Coaldale	Fremont	343	255	+34.51%	31.048 sq mi 80.413 km^{2}	11.05/sq mi 4.27/km^{2}	map	38.3557°N 105.8131°W
Colona	Ouray	36	30	+20.00%	0.061 sq mi 0.157 km^{2}	594/sq mi 229/km^{2}	map	38.3275°N 107.7793°W
Colorado City	Pueblo	2,237	2,193	+2.01%	14.956 sq mi 38.735 km^{2}	149.6/sq mi 57.8/km^{2}	map	37.9381°N 104.8453°W
Columbine	Jefferson, Arapahoe	25,229	24,280	+3.91%	6.631 sq mi 17.173 km^{2}	3,805/sq mi 1,469/km^{2}	map	39.5879°N 105.0694°W
Comanche Creek	Arapahoe	442	369	+19.78%	21.692 sq mi 56.183 km^{2}	20.38/sq mi 7.87/km^{2}	map	39.6150°N 104.3268°W
Conejos (Note: Conejos is the only remaining unincorporated county seat in Colorado.)†	Conejos	46	58	−20.69%	0.484 sq mi 1.254 km^{2}	95.0/sq mi 36.7/km^{2}	map	37.0873°N 106.0160°W
Cope	Washington	53	NA	NA	1.796 sq mi 4.651 km^{2}	29.5/sq mi 11.4/km^{2}	map	39.6692°N 102.8501°W
Copper Mountain	Summit	650	385	+68.83%	32.058 sq mi 83.030 km^{2}	20.28/sq mi 7.83/km^{2}	map	39.4769°N 106.2011°W
Cotopaxi	Fremont	44	47	−6.38%	0.286 sq mi 0.740 km^{2}	154.0/sq mi 59.5/km^{2}	map	38.3739°N 105.6908°W
Crisman	Boulder	179	186	−3.76%	1.457 sq mi 3.774 km^{2}	122.8/sq mi 47.4/km^{2}	map	40.0416°N 105.3674°W
Dakota Ridge	Jefferson	33,892	32,005	+5.90%	9.386 sq mi 24.311 km^{2}	3,611/sq mi 1,394/km^{2}	map	39.6192°N 105.1343°W
Derby	Adams	8,407	7,685	+9.39%	1.750 sq mi 4.532 km^{2}	4,805/sq mi 1,855/km^{2}	map	39.8403°N 104.9168°W
Divide	Teller	143	127	+12.60%	0.336 sq mi 0.869 km^{2}	426/sq mi 165/km^{2}	map	38.9450°N 105.1619°W
Dotsero	Eagle	1,172	705	+66.24%	1.356 sq mi 3.511 km^{2}	865/sq mi 334/km^{2}	map	39.6463°N 107.0540°W
Dove Valley	Arapahoe	5,640	5,243	+7.57%	3.578 sq mi 9.267 km^{2}	1,576/sq mi 609/km^{2}	map	39.5752°N 104.8308°W
Downieville-Lawson-Dumont	Clear Creek	527	594	−11.28%	0.778 sq mi 2.014 km^{2}	678/sq mi 262/km^{2}	map	39.7662°N 105.6126°W
East Pleasant View	Jefferson	333	356	−6.46%	0.111 sq mi 0.287 km^{2}	3,005/sq mi 1,160/km^{2}	map	39.7277°N 105.1572°W
Echo Hills	Clear Creek	313	NA	NA	0.568 sq mi 1.472 km^{2}	551/sq mi 213/km^{2}	map	39.6747°N 105.4134°W
Edwards (Note: Edwards is the principal community of the Edwards, CO Micropolitan Statistical Area and the Edwards-Rifle, CO Combined Statistical Area.)	Eagle	11,246	10,266	+9.55%	26.636 sq mi 68.988 km^{2}	422/sq mi 163/km^{2}	map	39.6215°N 106.6183°W
El Jebel	Eagle	4,130	3,801	+8.66%	5.305 sq mi 13.739 km^{2}	779/sq mi 301/km^{2}	map	39.4051°N 107.0920°W
El Moro	Las Animas	216	221	−2.26%	11.091 sq mi 28.725 km^{2}	19.48/sq mi 7.52/km^{2}	map	37.2350°N 104.4491°W
Elbert	Elbert	188	230	−18.26%	0.474 sq mi 1.227 km^{2}	397/sq mi 153/km^{2}	map	39.2189°N 104.5404°W
Eldora	Boulder	140	142	−1.41%	4.156 sq mi 10.763 km^{2}	33.7/sq mi 13.0/km^{2}	map	39.9536°N 105.5780°W
Eldorado Springs	Boulder	559	585	−4.44%	2.584 sq mi 6.692 km^{2}	216.3/sq mi 83.5/km^{2}	map	39.9367°N 105.2625°W
Ellicott	El Paso	1,248	1,131	+10.34%	10.922 sq mi 28.287 km^{2}	114.3/sq mi 44.1/km^{2}	map	38.8256°N 104.3829°W
Evergreen	Jefferson	9,307	9,038	+2.98%	11.522 sq mi 29.843 km^{2}	808/sq mi 312/km^{2}	map	39.6349°N 105.3356°W
Fairmount	Jefferson	9,324	7,559	+23.35%	6.084 sq mi 15.758 km^{2}	1,532/sq mi 592/km^{2}	map	39.7931°N 105.1712°W
Florissant	Teller	128	104	+23.08%	0.516 sq mi 1.336 km^{2}	248.1/sq mi 95.8/km^{2}	map	38.9446°N 105.2899°W
Floyd Hill	Clear Creek	1,048	998	+5.01%	6.290 sq mi 16.290 km^{2}	166.6/sq mi 64.3/km^{2}	map	39.7217°N 105.4313°W
Fort Carson	El Paso	17,693	13,813	+28.09%	27.969 sq mi 72.440 km^{2}	633/sq mi 244/km^{2}	map	38.7095°N 104.7720°W
Fort Garland	Costilla	464	433	+7.16%	0.376 sq mi 0.973 km^{2}	1,235/sq mi 477/km^{2}	map	37.4279°N 105.4350°W
Four Square Mile	Arapahoe	22,872	NA	NA	2.702 sq mi 6.997 km^{2}	8,466/sq mi 3,269/km^{2}	map	39.6807°N 104.8879°W
Franktown (Note: Frankstown (now spelled Franktown) was the original seat of Douglas County.)	Douglas	409	395	+3.54%	2.944 sq mi 7.625 km^{2}	138.9/sq mi 53.6/km^{2}	map	39.3905°N 104.7487°W
Fruitvale	Mesa	8,271	7,675	+7.77%	2.906 sq mi 7.526 km^{2}	2,846/sq mi 1,099/km^{2}	map	39.0933°N 108.4789°W
Fulford	Eagle	0	2	−100.00%	0.222 sq mi 0.575 km^{2}	0/sq mi 0/km^{2}	map	39.5166°N 106.6575°W
Gardner	Huerfano	106	NA	NA	2.472 sq mi 6.403 km^{2}	42.9/sq mi 16.6/km^{2}	map	37.7889°N 105.1645°W
Garfield	Chaffee	27	15	+80.00%	0.341 sq mi 0.883 km^{2}	79.2/sq mi 30.6/km^{2}	map	38.5493°N 106.2893°W
Genesee	Jefferson	3,610	3,609	+0.03%	6.657 sq mi 17.242 km^{2}	542/sq mi 209/km^{2}	map	39.6873°N 105.2719°W
Gerrard	Rio Grande	264	278	−5.04%	1.198 sq mi 3.103 km^{2}	220.4/sq mi 85.1/km^{2}	map	37.6783°N 106.5752°W
Glendale (Note: The Glendale CDP in Boulder County should not be confused with the City of Glendale in Arapahoe County.)	Boulder	64	69	−7.25%	1.255 sq mi 3.251 km^{2}	51.0/sq mi 19.7/km^{2}	map	40.0869°N 105.3715°W
Gleneagle	El Paso	6,649	6,611	+0.57%	2.338 sq mi 6.056 km^{2}	2,844/sq mi 1,098/km^{2}	map	39.0453°N 104.8287°W
Gold Hill	Boulder	218	230	−5.22%	2.075 sq mi 5.374 km^{2}	105.1/sq mi 40.6/km^{2}	map	40.0597°N 105.4189°W
Goldfield	Teller	63	49	+28.57%	0.141 sq mi 0.365 km^{2}	447/sq mi 173/km^{2}	map	38.7176°N 105.1253°W
Grand View Estates	Douglas	689	528	+30.49%	0.998 sq mi 2.584 km^{2}	691/sq mi 267/km^{2}	map	39.5439°N 104.8206°W
Guffey	Park	111	98	+13.27%	8.674 sq mi 22.466 km^{2}	12.80/sq mi 4.94/km^{2}	map	38.7591°N 105.5024°W
Gunbarrel	Boulder	9,554	9,263	+3.14%	6.249 sq mi 16.185 km^{2}	1,529/sq mi 590/km^{2}	map	40.0632°N 105.1713°W
Hartsel	Park	38	NA	NA	0.188 sq mi 0.486 km^{2}	202.5/sq mi 78.2/km^{2}	map	39.0221°N 105.7982°W
Hasty	Bent	182	144	+26.39%	2.753 sq mi 7.131 km^{2}	66.1/sq mi 25.5/km^{2}	map	38.0999°N 102.9639°W
Heeney	Summit	74	76	−2.63%	0.227 sq mi 0.589 km^{2}	325/sq mi 126/km^{2}	map	39.8711°N 106.3001°W
Hidden Lake	Boulder	24	31	−22.58%	0.611 sq mi 1.583 km^{2}	39.3/sq mi 15.2/km^{2}	map	40.1055°N 105.4777°W
Highlands Ranch	Douglas	103,444	96,713	+6.96%	24.269 sq mi 62.855 km^{2}	4,262/sq mi 1,646/km^{2}	map	39.5419°N 104.9708°W
Hoehne	Las Animas	80	111	−27.93%	3.106 sq mi 8.046 km^{2}	25.75/sq mi 9.94/km^{2}	map	37.2814°N 104.3891°W
Holly Hills (Note: The Holly Hills CDP is an enclave of the City and County of Denver.)	Arapahoe	2,683	2,521	+6.43%	0.580 sq mi 1.503 km^{2}	4,623/sq mi 1,785/km^{2}	map	39.6677°N 104.9216°W
Howard	Fremont	852	723	+17.84%	16.741 sq mi 43.360 km^{2}	50.9/sq mi 19.6/km^{2}	map	38.4098°N 105.8424°W
Idalia	Yuma	97	88	+10.23%	0.085 sq mi 0.220 km^{2}	1,142/sq mi 441/km^{2}	map	39.7029°N 102.2938°W
Idledale	Jefferson	244	252	−3.17%	0.277 sq mi 0.717 km^{2}	881/sq mi 340/km^{2}	map	39.6689°N 105.2432°W
Indian Hills	Jefferson	1,474	1,280	+15.16%	5.425 sq mi 14.051 km^{2}	272/sq mi 105/km^{2}	map	39.6294°N 105.2509°W
Inverness	Arapahoe	2,226	1,532	+45.30%	1.117 sq mi 2.893 km^{2}	1,993/sq mi 769/km^{2}	map	39.5758°N 104.8653°W
Jackson Lake	Morgan	131	154	−14.94%	3.060 sq mi 7.924 km^{2}	42.8/sq mi 16.5/km^{2}	map	40.3757°N 104.0712°W
Jansen	Las Animas	101	112	−9.82%	1.173 sq mi 3.039 km^{2}	86.1/sq mi 33.2/km^{2}	map	37.1582°N 104.5501°W
Joes	Yuma	82	80	+2.50%	2.085 sq mi 5.401 km^{2}	39.3/sq mi 15.2/km^{2}	map	39.6559°N 102.6785°W
Johnson Village	Chaffee	299	246	+21.54%	0.299 sq mi 0.774 km^{2}	1,001/sq mi 386/km^{2}	map	38.8119°N 106.1071°W
Ken Caryl	Jefferson	33,811	32,438	+4.23%	9.833 sq mi 25.467 km^{2}	3,439/sq mi 1,328/km^{2}	map	39.5770°N 105.1143°W
Keystone (Note: The Town of Keystone incorporated on February 8, 2024.)	Summit	1,369	1,079	+26.88%	41.402 sq mi 107.230 km^{2}	33.1/sq mi 12.8/km^{2}	map	39.5901°N 105.9383°W
Kirk	Yuma	61	59	+3.39%	4.101 sq mi 10.622 km^{2}	14.87/sq mi 5.74/km^{2}	map	39.6127°N 102.5920°W
Kittredge	Jefferson	1,308	1,304	+0.31%	1.884 sq mi 4.880 km^{2}	694/sq mi 268/km^{2}	map	39.6593°N 105.3045°W
La Junta Gardens	Otero	123	153	−19.61%	0.533 sq mi 1.381 km^{2}	230.7/sq mi 89.1/km^{2}	map	38.0013°N 103.5549°W
Laird	Yuma	46	47	−2.13%	0.150 sq mi 0.389 km^{2}	306/sq mi 118/km^{2}	map	40.0818°N 102.1019°W
Laporte (Note: La Porte (now spelled Laporte) was the original seat of Heele County, Jefferson Territory, and later Larimer County, Colorado Territory.)	Larimer	2,409	2,450	−1.67%	6.116 sq mi 15.841 km^{2}	394/sq mi 152/km^{2}	map	40.6385°N 105.1443°W
Lazear	Delta	168	NA	NA	1.602 sq mi 4.150 km^{2}	104.8/sq mi 40.5/km^{2}	map	38.7788°N 107.7804°W
Lazy Acres	Boulder	957	920	+4.02%	5.289 sq mi 13.700 km^{2}	180.9/sq mi 69.9/km^{2}	map	40.0837°N 105.3313°W
Leadville North	Lake	1,892	1,794	+5.46%	2.449 sq mi 6.343 km^{2}	773/sq mi 298/km^{2}	map	39.2600°N 106.3113°W
Lewis	Montezuma	257	302	−14.90%	3.111 sq mi 8.056 km^{2}	82.6/sq mi 31.9/km^{2}	map	37.5017°N 108.6601°W
Leyner	Boulder	40	29	+37.93%	0.195 sq mi 0.506 km^{2}	204.7/sq mi 79.1/km^{2}	map	40.0511°N 105.1074°W
Lincoln Park	Fremont	3,934	3,546	+10.94%	3.785 sq mi 9.803 km^{2}	1,039/sq mi 401/km^{2}	map	38.4255°N 105.2132°W
Loghill Village	Ouray	617	521	+18.43%	6.129 sq mi 15.874 km^{2}	100.7/sq mi 38.9/km^{2}	map	38.1992°N 107.7753°W
Loma	Mesa	1,314	1,293	+1.62%	10.889 sq mi 28.203 km^{2}	120.7/sq mi 46.6/km^{2}	map	39.2075°N 108.8050°W
Louviers	Douglas	293	269	+8.92%	1.580 sq mi 4.093 km^{2}	185.4/sq mi 71.6/km^{2}	map	39.4799°N 105.0033°W
Lynn	Las Animas	11	12	−8.33%	0.717 sq mi 1.857 km^{2}	15.34/sq mi 5.92/km^{2}	map	37.4219°N 104.6431°W
Marvel	La Plata	68	NA	NA	0.133 sq mi 0.345 km^{2}	510/sq mi 197/km^{2}	map	37.1112°N 108.1263°W
Matheson	Elbert	79	NA	NA	1.716 sq mi 4.444 km^{2}	46.0/sq mi 17.8/km^{2}	map	39.1683°N 103.9770°W
Maybell	Moffat	76	72	+5.56%	0.518 sq mi 1.342 km^{2}	146.7/sq mi 56.6/km^{2}	map	40.5190°N 108.0888°W
Maysville	Chaffee	173	135	+28.15%	12.420 sq mi 32.167 km^{2}	13.93/sq mi 5.38/km^{2}	map	38.5305°N 106.2156°W
McClave	Bent	129	NA	NA	1.914 sq mi 4.956 km^{2}	67.4/sq mi 26.0/km^{2}	map	38.1315°N 102.8504°W
McCoy	Eagle	30	24	+25.00%	0.294 sq mi 0.761 km^{2}	102.1/sq mi 39.4/km^{2}	map	39.9144°N 106.7257°W
Meridian	Douglas	4,786	2,970	+61.14%	0.509 sq mi 1.319 km^{2}	9,398/sq mi 3,629/km^{2}	map	39.5281°N 104.8258°W
Meridian Village	Douglas	3,202	NA	NA	2.563 sq mi 6.639 km^{2}	1,249/sq mi 482/km^{2}	map	39.5457°N 104.8533°W
Midland	Teller	182	156	+16.67%	1.721 sq mi 4.458 km^{2}	105.7/sq mi 40.8/km^{2}	map	38.8468°N 105.1579°W
Morgan Heights	Morgan	298	266	+12.03%	0.285 sq mi 0.739 km^{2}	1,044/sq mi 403/km^{2}	map	40.2875°N 103.8274°W
Mountain Meadows	Boulder	237	274	−13.50%	1.723 sq mi 4.462 km^{2}	137.6/sq mi 53.1/km^{2}	map	40.0270°N 105.3831°W
Mulford	Garfield	259	174	+48.85%	0.668 sq mi 1.731 km^{2}	388/sq mi 150/km^{2}	map	39.4064°N 107.1660°W
Nathrop	Chaffee	288	NA	NA	0.723 sq mi 1.873 km^{2}	398/sq mi 154/km^{2}	map	38.7487°N 106.0764°W
Niwot	Boulder	4,306	4,006	+7.49%	3.996 sq mi 10.350 km^{2}	1,078/sq mi 416/km^{2}	map	40.0980°N 105.1552°W
No Name	Garfield	117	123	−4.88%	0.179 sq mi 0.463 km^{2}	654/sq mi 253/km^{2}	map	39.5597°N 107.2928°W
Norrie	Pitkin	7	7	0.00%	0.188 sq mi 0.487 km^{2}	37.2/sq mi 14.4/km^{2}	map	39.3281°N 106.6563°W
North La Junta	Otero	482	512	−5.86%	1.360 sq mi 3.523 km^{2}	354/sq mi 137/km^{2}	map	37.9985°N 103.5227°W
North Washington	Adams	733	484	+51.45%	5.175 sq mi 13.403 km^{2}	141.6/sq mi 54.7/km^{2}	map	39.8084°N 104.9792°W
Orchard	Morgan	76	90	−15.56%	3.698 sq mi 9.577 km^{2}	20.55/sq mi 7.94/km^{2}	map	39.0363°N 108.5166°W
Orchard Mesa	Mesa	6,688	6,836	−2.17%	0.160 sq mi 0.414 km^{2}	41,840/sq mi 16,155/km^{2}	map	40.3320°N 104.1178°W
Padroni	Logan	75	76	−1.32%	0.811 sq mi 2.101 km^{2}	92.5/sq mi 35.7/km^{2}	map	40.7818°N 103.1733°W
Paragon Estates	Boulder	975	928	+5.06%	1.676 sq mi 4.341 km^{2}	582/sq mi 225/km^{2}	map	39.9802°N 105.1813°W
Park Center	Fremont	2,953	NA	NA	6.549 sq mi 16.962 km^{2}	451/sq mi 174/km^{2}	map	38.4835°N 105.2240°W
Parshall	Grand	42	47	−10.64%	0.299 sq mi 0.774 km^{2}	140.5/sq mi 54.3/km^{2}	map	40.0556°N 106.1760°W
Penrose	Fremont	3,685	3,582	+2.88%	17.846 sq mi 46.221 km^{2}	206.5/sq mi 79.7/km^{2}	map	38.4213°N 105.0004°W
Peoria	Arapahoe	153	163	−6.13%	13.765 sq mi 35.650 km^{2}	11.12/sq mi 4.29/km^{2}	map	39.6649°N 104.1456°W
Perry Park	Douglas	1,932	1,646	+17.38%	8.552 sq mi 22.149 km^{2}	225.9/sq mi 87.2/km^{2}	map	39.2595°N 104.9824°W
Peyton	El Paso	214	250	−14.40%	2.297 sq mi 5.950 km^{2}	93.2/sq mi 36.0/km^{2}	map	39.0330°N 104.4904°W
Phippsburg	Routt	234	204	+14.71%	1.186 sq mi 3.072 km^{2}	197.3/sq mi 76.2/km^{2}	map	40.2301°N 106.9508°W
Piedra	Hinsdale	31	28	+10.71%	11.621 sq mi 30.098 km^{2}	2.67/sq mi 1.03/km^{2}	map	37.4418°N 107.1684°W
Pine Brook Hill	Boulder	975	983	−0.81%	2.860 sq mi 7.408 km^{2}	341/sq mi 132/km^{2}	map	40.0471°N 105.3104°W
Pine Valley	Clear Creek	363	NA	NA	0.823 sq mi 2.133 km^{2}	441/sq mi 170/km^{2}	map	39.6909°N 105.4132°W
Placerville	San Miguel	362	NA	NA	0.757 sq mi 1.961 km^{2}	478/sq mi 185/km^{2}	map	38.0051°N 108.0395°W
Ponderosa Park	Elbert	3,334	3,232	+3.16%	14.583 sq mi 37.770 km^{2}	228.6/sq mi 88.3/km^{2}	map	39.3987°N 104.6355°W
Portland	Ouray	136	135	+0.74%	3.202 sq mi 8.293 km^{2}	42.5/sq mi 16.4/km^{2}	map	38.0892°N 107.6952°W
Pueblo West	Pueblo	33,086	29,637	+11.64%	49.688 sq mi 128.692 km^{2}	666/sq mi 257/km^{2}	map	38.3465°N 104.7246°W
Red Feather Lakes	Larimer	426	343	+24.20%	9.116 sq mi 23.610 km^{2}	46.7/sq mi 18.0/km^{2}	map	40.8071°N 105.5864°W
Redlands	Mesa	9,061	8,685	+4.33%	13.350 sq mi 34.575 km^{2}	679/sq mi 262/km^{2}	map	39.0887°N 108.6585°W
Redstone	Pitkin	127	130	−2.31%	0.438 sq mi 1.134 km^{2}	290/sq mi 112/km^{2}	map	39.1840°N 107.2406°W
Redvale	Montrose	172	236	−27.12%	4.680 sq mi 12.121 km^{2}	36.8/sq mi 14.2/km^{2}	map	38.1761°N 108.4125°W
Rock Creek Park	El Paso	68	58	+17.24%	0.266 sq mi 0.688 km^{2}	256.0/sq mi 98.8/km^{2}	map	38.7011°N 104.8347°W
Rollinsville	Gilpin	194	181	+7.18%	1.412 sq mi 3.658 km^{2}	137.4/sq mi 53.0/km^{2}	map	39.9232°N 105.5136°W
Roxborough Park	Douglas	9,416	9,099	+3.48%	9.232 sq mi 23.911 km^{2}	1,020/sq mi 394/km^{2}	map	39.4492°N 105.0746°W
Saddle Ridge	Morgan	66	56	+17.86%	0.174 sq mi 0.451 km^{2}	379/sq mi 146/km^{2}	map	40.3131°N 103.8023°W
Salt Creek	Pueblo	507	587	−13.63%	0.432 sq mi 1.119 km^{2}	1,173/sq mi 453/km^{2}	map	38.2407°N 104.5866°W
San Acacio	Costilla	56	40	+40.00%	1.257 sq mi 3.255 km^{2}	44.6/sq mi 17.2/km^{2}	map	37.2086°N 105.5666°W
Security-Widefield	El Paso	38,639	32,882	+17.51%	12.993 sq mi 33.653 km^{2}	2,974/sq mi 1,148/km^{2}	map	38.7488°N 104.7142°W
Sedalia	Douglas	177	206	−14.08%	1.363 sq mi 3.531 km^{2}	129.8/sq mi 50.1/km^{2}	map	39.4397°N 104.9699°W
Segundo	Las Animas	100	98	+2.04%	0.694 sq mi 1.797 km^{2}	144.1/sq mi 55.6/km^{2}	map	37.1225°N 104.7397°W
Seven Hills	Boulder	129	121	+6.61%	0.489 sq mi 1.266 km^{2}	264/sq mi 102/km^{2}	map	40.0361°N 105.3323°W
Shaw Heights	Adams	5,185	5,116	+1.35%	0.700 sq mi 1.814 km^{2}	7,403/sq mi 2,858/km^{2}	map	39.8566°N 105.0391°W
Sherrelwood	Adams	19,228	18,287	+5.15%	2.429 sq mi 6.290 km^{2}	7,917/sq mi 3,057/km^{2}	map	39.8389°N 105.0014°W
Sierra Ridge	Douglas	3,490	NA	NA	0.506 sq mi 1.311 km^{2}	6,895/sq mi 2,662/km^{2}	map	39.5286°N 104.8172°W
Smeltertown	Chaffee	88	120	−26.67%	0.146 sq mi 0.378 km^{2}	603/sq mi 233/km^{2}	map	38.5523°N 106.0084°W
Snyder	Morgan	136	132	+3.03%	0.354 sq mi 0.917 km^{2}	384/sq mi 148/km^{2}	map	40.3308°N 103.5920°W
Somerset	Gunnison	55	NA	NA	0.190 sq mi 0.492 km^{2}	290/sq mi 112/km^{2}	map	38.9267°N 107.4725°W
Southern Ute	La Plata	158	177	−10.73%	15.959 sq mi 41.335 km^{2}	9.90/sq mi 3.82/km^{2}	map	37.0749°N 107.5933°W
St. Ann Highlands	Boulder	325	288	+12.85%	1.391 sq mi 3.602 km^{2}	233.7/sq mi 90.2/km^{2}	map	39.9873°N 105.4558°W
St. Mary's	Clear Creek	333	283	+17.67%	1.438 sq mi 3.726 km^{2}	231.5/sq mi 89.4/km^{2}	map	39.8163°N 105.6479°W
Stepping Stone	Douglas	2,780	NA	NA	0.737 sq mi 1.908 km^{2}	3,774/sq mi 1,457/km^{2}	map	39.5140°N 104.8217°W
Sterling Ranch	Douglas	1,789	NA	NA	5.529 sq mi 14.320 km^{2}	324/sq mi 125/km^{2}	map	39.4932°N 105.0475°W
Stonegate	Douglas	9,072	8,962	+1.23%	1.832 sq mi 4.745 km^{2}	4,952/sq mi 1,912/km^{2}	map	39.5357°N 104.8033°W
Stonewall Gap	Las Animas	66	67	−1.49%	1.920 sq mi 4.974 km^{2}	34.4/sq mi 13.3/km^{2}	map	37.1605°N 105.0342°W
Strasburg	Adams, Arapahoe	3,307	2,447	+35.15%	20.805 sq mi 53.885 km^{2}	159.0/sq mi 61.4/km^{2}	map	39.7181°N 104.3195°W
Stratmoor	El Paso	6,518	6,900	−5.54%	2.633 sq mi 6.819 km^{2}	2,476/sq mi 956/km^{2}	map	38.7731°N 104.7786°W
Sugarloaf	Boulder	274	261	+4.98%	2.178 sq mi 5.640 km^{2}	125.8/sq mi 48.6/km^{2}	map	40.0189°N 105.4077°W
Sunshine	Boulder	198	230	−13.91%	1.730 sq mi 4.481 km^{2}	114.4/sq mi 44.2/km^{2}	map	40.0637°N 105.3696°W
Tabernash	Grand	401	417	−3.84%	4.747 sq mi 12.295 km^{2}	84.5/sq mi 32.6/km^{2}	map	39.9788°N 105.8444°W
Tall Timber	Boulder	185	208	−11.06%	0.574 sq mi 1.487 km^{2}	322/sq mi 124/km^{2}	map	40.0151°N 105.3498°W
The Pinery	Douglas	11,311	10,517	+7.55%	10.379 sq mi 26.882 km^{2}	1,090/sq mi 421/km^{2}	map	39.4462°N 104.7591°W
Todd Creek	Adams	5,028	3,768	+33.44%	9.694 sq mi 25.108 km^{2}	519/sq mi 200/km^{2}	map	39.9795°N 104.8725°W
Towaoc (Note: Towaoc is the headquarters of the Ute Mountain Ute Tribe.)	Montezuma	1,120	1,087	+3.04%	3.585 sq mi 9.284 km^{2}	312/sq mi 121/km^{2}	map	37.2126°N 108.7265°W
Towner	Kiowa	18	22	−18.18%	0.037 sq mi 0.097 km^{2}	481/sq mi 186/km^{2}	map	38.4704°N 102.0805°W
Trail Side	Morgan	157	59	+166.10%	0.717 sq mi 1.856 km^{2}	219.1/sq mi 84.6/km^{2}	map	40.2490°N 103.8432°W
Twin Lakes (Note: The Twin Lakes CDP in Adams County should not be confused with Twin Lakes CDP in Lake County.)	Adams	8,226	6,101	+34.83%	1.644 sq mi 4.258 km^{2}	5,004/sq mi 1,932/km^{2}	map	39.8229°N 105.0036°W
Twin Lakes	Lake	204	171	+19.30%	6.735 sq mi 17.444 km^{2}	30.3/sq mi 11.7/km^{2}	map	39.1037°N 106.3190°W
Upper Bear Creek	Clear Creek	984	1,059	−7.08%	3.785 sq mi 9.803 km^{2}	260/sq mi 100/km^{2}	map	39.6319°N 105.4154°W
Upper Witter Gulch	Clear Creek	380	NA	NA	0.911 sq mi 2.358 km^{2}	417/sq mi 161/km^{2}	map	39.6611°N 105.4268°W
Valdez	Las Animas	46	47	−2.13%	1.608 sq mi 4.166 km^{2}	28.6/sq mi 11.0/km^{2}	map	37.1239°N 104.6794°W
Valmont	Boulder	64	59	+8.47%	0.270 sq mi 0.698 km^{2}	237.5/sq mi 91.7/km^{2}	map	40.0342°N 105.2059°W
Vernon	Yuma	38	29	+31.03%	1.132 sq mi 2.933 km^{2}	33.6/sq mi 13.0/km^{2}	map	39.9400°N 102.3074°W
Vineland	Pueblo	269	251	+7.17%	0.566 sq mi 1.467 km^{2}	475/sq mi 183/km^{2}	map	38.2447°N 104.4599°W
Watkins	Arapahoe, Adams	682	653	+4.44%	24.752 sq mi 64.109 km^{2}	27.6/sq mi 10.6/km^{2}	map	39.6984°N 104.5772°W
Welby	Adams	15,553	14,846	+4.76%	3.706 sq mi 9.597 km^{2}	4,197/sq mi 1,621/km^{2}	map	39.8403°N 104.9655°W
Weldona	Morgan	113	139	−18.71%	0.157 sq mi 0.406 km^{2}	721/sq mi 278/km^{2}	map	40.3484°N 103.9694°W
West Pleasant View	Jefferson	4,327	3,840	+12.68%	1.543 sq mi 3.996 km^{2}	2,805/sq mi 1,083/km^{2}	map	39.7319°N 105.1784°W
Westcreek	Douglas	120	129	−6.98%	1.218 sq mi 3.155 km^{2}	98.5/sq mi 38.0/km^{2}	map	39.1499°N 105.1626°W
Weston	Las Animas	53	55	−3.64%	3.099 sq mi 8.026 km^{2}	17.10/sq mi 6.60/km^{2}	map	37.1459°N 104.8683°W
Wolcott	Eagle	20	15	+33.33%	0.369 sq mi 0.956 km^{2}	54.2/sq mi 20.9/km^{2}	map	39.7035°N 106.6800°W
Woodmoor	El Paso	9,536	8,741	+9.10%	6.031 sq mi 15.621 km^{2}	1,581/sq mi 610/km^{2}	map	39.1063°N 104.8456°W
Woody Creek	Pitkin	290	263	+10.27%	0.613 sq mi 1.587 km^{2}	473/sq mi 183/km^{2}	map	39.2709°N 106.8883°W
All 210 census-designated places		714,417	619,293	NA	1,077.3 sq mi 2,790.3 km^{2}	663/sq mi 256/km^{2}	map	38.9972°N 105.5478°W

=== Census-designated places in multiple counties ===
The following table contains the 2020 population of each of the five census-designated places that currently extend into more than one Colorado county.

Colorado census-designated places in multiple counties
Census-designated place	2020 Census			
Census-designated place	Total	County	by county	%
Brook Forest	622	Jefferson	334	53.7%
Brook Forest	622	Clear Creek	288	46.3%
Coal Creek	2,494	Jefferson	1,537	61.6%
Coal Creek	2,494	Boulder	665	26.7%
Coal Creek	2,494	Gilpin	292	11.7%
Columbine	25,229	Jefferson	23,247	92.1%
Columbine	25,229	Arapahoe	1,982	7.9%
Strasburg	3,307	Adams	2,036	61.6%
Strasburg	3,307	Arapahoe	1,271	38.4%
Watkins	682	Arapahoe	594	87.1%
Watkins	682	Adams	88	12.9%

== See also ==
- Bibliography of Colorado
- Geography of Colorado
- History of Colorado
- Index of Colorado-related articles
- List of Colorado-related lists
  - List of counties in Colorado
  - List of populated places in Colorado
  - List of populated places in Colorado by county
- Outline of Colorado
