= Colorado's 2nd congressional district =

U.S. House district for Colorado

Coordinates: 40°08′53″N 105°44′40″W

- Interactive map of district boundaries since January 3, 2023
- Representative: Joe Neguse; D–Lafayette
- Distribution: 81.04% urban; 18.96% rural
- Population (2025): 729,991
- Median household income: $106,034
- Ethnicity: 76.1% White; 14.2% Hispanic; 4.3% Two or more races; 3.5% Asian; 0.9% Black; 0.9% other
- Cook PVI: D+20

Colorado's 2nd congressional district is a congressional district in the U.S. state of Colorado. The district is located in the north-central part of the state, and encompasses the Front Range northwest of Denver, mainly centered around the college towns of Boulder and Fort Collins. The district also includes the mountain towns of Vail, Granby, Steamboat Springs, and Idaho Springs. Redistricting in 2011 moved Larimer County, including the cities of Fort Collins and Loveland, to the 2nd from the 4th district. Meanwhile, redistricting in 2021 moved Loveland back to the 4th district and Broomfield and western Jefferson County to the 7th district.

The district is currently represented by Democrat Joe Neguse. He was elected in 2018 to replace Jared Polis, who retired after being elected governor of Colorado.

== History ==
=== 1890s ===
Following the 1890 U.S. census and associated reapportionment of seats in the United States House of Representatives, Colorado gained a second congressional district. The first representative elected to this district was John Calhoun Bell of The Populist party.

=== 1990s ===
Following the 1990 U.S. census and associated realignment of Colorado congressional districts, the 2nd congressional district consisted of Boulder, Clear Creek, and Gilpin counties, as well as portions of Adams, and Jefferson counties.

=== 2000s ===
Following the 2000 U.S. census and associated realignment of Colorado congressional districts, the 2nd congressional district consisted of Broomfield, Clear Creek, Eagle, Gilpin, Grand, and Summit counties, as well as portions of Adams, Boulder, Jefferson, and Weld counties.

=== 2010s ===
Following the 2010 U.S. census and associated realignment of Colorado congressional districts, the 2nd congressional district consisted of Broomfield, Clear Creek, Gilpin, Grand and Summit counties; most of Boulder and Jefferson counties; and portions of Eagle, Larimer and Weld counties. Following the census, the 2nd district stretched further north to the Wyoming border while losing the western portion of Eagle County.

=== 2020s ===
Redistricting in 2021 moved Loveland back to the 4th district and Broomfield and western Jefferson County to the 7th district. Also the 3rd congressional district lost Jackson County, Routt County, and most of Eagle County to the 2nd district.

== Composition ==
For the 118th and successive Congresses (based on redistricting following the 2020 census), the district contains all or portions of the following counties and communities:

Boulder County (34)

Allenspark, Altona, Bark Ranch, Bonanza Mountain Estates, Boulder, Coal Creek (shared with Gilpin and Jefferson counties), Crisman, Eldora, Eldorado Springs, Erie (shared with Weld County), Glendale, Gold Hill, Gunbarrel, Hidden Lake, Jamestown, Lafayette, Lazy Acres, Leyner, Longmont (shared with Weld County), Louisville, Lyons, Mountain Meadows, Nederland, Niwot, Paragon Estates, Pine Brook Hill, St. Ann Highlands, Seven Hills, Sugarloaf, Sunshine, Superior, Tall Timber, Valmont, Ward

Clear Creek County (14)

All 14 communities

Eagle County (10)

Avon, Eagle, Edwards, Fulford, Gypsum (part; also 3rd), McCoy, Minturn, Red Cliff, Vail, Wolcott

Gilpin County (4)

All 4 communities

Grand County (8)

All 8 communities

Jackson County (1)

Walden

Jefferson County (2)

Arvada, Coal Creek (shared with Boulder and Gilpin counties)

Larimer County (5)

Estes Park, Fort Collins, Laporte, Red Feather Lakes, Timnath

Routt County (5)

All 5 communities

Summit County (9)

All 9 communities

Weld County (2)

Erie (shared with Boulder County), Longmont (shared with Boulder County)

== Recent election results from statewide races ==
Year	Office	Results
2008	President	Obama 65% - 33%
2008	Senate	Udall 63% - 33%
2010	Senate	Bennet 59% - 36%
2010	Governor	Hickenlooper 63% - 8%
2010	Secretary of State	Buescher 55% - 40%
2010	Treasurer	Kennedy 60% - 40%
2010	Attorney General	Garnett 56% - 44%
2012	President	Obama 64% - 36%
2014	Senate	Udall 51% - 44%
2016	President	Clinton 61% - 30%
2016	Senate	Bennet 60% - 33%
2018	Governor	Polis 67% - 30%
2018	Attorney General	Weiser 65% - 32%
2020	President	Biden 69% - 29%
2020	Senate	Hickenlooper 67% - 31%
2022	Senate	Bennet 69% - 28%
2022	Governor	Polis 72% - 26%
2022	Secretary of State	Griswold 69% - 29%
2022	Treasurer	Young 67% - 30%
2022	Attorney General	Weiser 68% - 29%
2024	President	Harris 68% - 29%

== Characteristics ==
This district is anchored in Boulder and Larimer counties which have the bulk of population in the district: both counties are anchored by the large college towns consisting of Colorado's two main state universities - University of Colorado Boulder in Boulder and Colorado State University in Fort Collins, providing Democratic strength in the district.

The other parts of the district are diverse, ranging from far western Denver suburbs to agricultural areas and mountain towns. Eagle and Summit counties, home to the ski resort towns of Vail and Breckenridge and other tourism dependent towns such as Avon, Frisco and Silverthorne, are Democratic strongholds: however Gilpin and Clear Creek counties, while also being tourism dependent and Democratic leaning, do not vote as strongly for the Democrats. Grand County leans Republican, though the ski resort areas of the county in Winter Park are heavily Democratic. While the district included Denver's northwestern suburbs for a long time, redistricting caused Jefferson and Broomfield counties to be mostly moved to the 7th district outside of a small part of Arvada that remains in the 2nd.

== List of members representing the district ==
Member (District home)	Party	Years	Cong ress	Electoral history	District location
District created March 4, 1893
John Calhoun Bell (Montrose)	Populist	March 4, 1893 – March 3, 1903	53rd 54th 55th 56th 57th	Elected in 1892. Re-elected in 1894. Re-elected in 1896. Re-elected in 1898. Re-elected in 1900. Lost re-election.	
Herschel M. Hogg (Telluride)	Republican	March 4, 1903 – March 3, 1907	58th 59th	Elected in 1902; Re-elected in 1904. Retired.	
Warren A. Haggott (Idaho Springs)	Republican	March 4, 1907 – March 3, 1909	60th	Elected in 1906. Lost re-election.	
John Andrew Martin (Pueblo)	Democratic	March 4, 1909 – March 3, 1913	61st 62nd	Elected in 1908. Re-elected in 1910. Retired.	
Harry H. Seldomridge (Colorado Springs)	Democratic	March 4, 1913 – March 3, 1915	63rd	Elected in 1912. Lost re-election.	
Charles B. Timberlake (Sterling)	Republican	March 4, 1915 – March 3, 1933	64th 65th 66th 67th 68th 69th 70th 71st 72nd	Elected in 1914. Re-elected in 1916. Re-elected in 1918. Re-elected in 1920. Re-elected in 1922. Re-elected in 1924. Re-elected in 1926. Re-elected in 1928. Re-elected in 1930. Lost renomination.	
Fred N. Cummings (Fort Collins)	Democratic	March 4, 1933 – January 3, 1941	73rd 74th 75th 76th	Elected in 1932. Re-elected in 1934. Re-elected in 1936. Re-elected in 1938. Lost re-election.	
William S. Hill (Fort Collins)	Republican	January 3, 1941 – January 3, 1959	77th 78th 79th 80th 81st 82nd 83rd 84th 85th	Elected in 1940. Re-elected in 1942. Re-elected in 1944. Re-elected in 1946. Re-elected in 1948. Re-elected in 1950. Re-elected in 1952. Re-elected in 1954. Re-elected in 1956. Retired.	
Byron Johnson (Denver)	Democratic	January 3, 1959 – January 3, 1961	86th	Elected in 1958. Lost re-election.	
Pete Dominick (Englewood)	Republican	January 3, 1961 – January 3, 1963	87th	Elected in 1960. Retired to run for U.S. senator.	
Don Brotzman (Boulder)	Republican	January 3, 1963 – January 3, 1965	88th	Elected in 1962. Lost re-election.	
Roy H. McVicker (Wheat Ridge)	Democratic	January 3, 1965 – January 3, 1967	89th	Elected in 1964. Lost re-election.	
Don Brotzman (Boulder)	Republican	January 3, 1967 – January 3, 1975	90th 91st 92nd 93rd	Elected again in 1966. Re-elected in 1968. Re-elected in 1970. Re-elected in 1972. Lost re-election	
Tim Wirth (Boulder)	Democratic	January 3, 1975 – January 3, 1987	94th 95th 96th 97th 98th 99th	Elected in 1974. Re-elected in 1976. Re-elected in 1978. Re-elected in 1980. Re-elected in 1982. Re-elected in 1984. Retired to run for U.S. senator.	
David Skaggs (Boulder)	Democratic	January 3, 1987 – January 3, 1999	100th 101st 102nd 103rd 104th 105th	Elected in 1986. Re-elected in 1988. Re-elected in 1990. Re-elected in 1992. Re-elected in 1994. Re-elected in 1996. Retired.	
Mark Udall (Eldorado Springs)	Democratic	January 3, 1999 – January 3, 2009	106th 107th 108th 109th 110th	Elected in 1998. Re-elected in 2000. Re-elected in 2002. Re-elected in 2004. Re-elected in 2006. Retired to run for U.S. senator.	
Mark Udall (Eldorado Springs)	Democratic	January 3, 1999 – January 3, 2009	106th 107th 108th 109th 110th	Elected in 1998. Re-elected in 2000. Re-elected in 2002. Re-elected in 2004. Re-elected in 2006. Retired to run for U.S. senator.	2003–2013
Jared Polis (Boulder)	Democratic	January 3, 2009 – January 3, 2019	111th 112th 113th 114th 115th	Elected in 2008. Re-elected in 2010. Re-elected in 2012. Re-elected in 2014. Re-elected in 2016. Retired to run for Governor of Colorado.	2003–2013
Jared Polis (Boulder)	Democratic	January 3, 2009 – January 3, 2019	111th 112th 113th 114th 115th	Elected in 2008. Re-elected in 2010. Re-elected in 2012. Re-elected in 2014. Re-elected in 2016. Retired to run for Governor of Colorado.	2013–2023
Joe Neguse (Lafayette)	Democratic	January 3, 2019 – present	116th 117th 118th 119th	Elected in 2018. Re-elected in 2020. Re-elected in 2022. Re-elected in 2024. Re-elected in 2026.	2013–2023
Joe Neguse (Lafayette)	Democratic	January 3, 2019 – present	116th 117th 118th 119th	Elected in 2018. Re-elected in 2020. Re-elected in 2022. Re-elected in 2024. Re-elected in 2026.	2023–present

== Previous election results ==
=== 2002–2012 ===
==== 2002 ====
2002 Colorado's 2nd congressional district election
Party	Candidate	Votes	%
Democratic	Mark Udall (incumbent)	123,504	60.1
Republican	Sandy Hume	75,564	36.8
Libertarian	Norm Olsen	3,579	1.7
Natural Law	Patrick West	1,617	0.8
American Constitution	Erik Brauer	1,258	0.6
Majority		47,940	23.3
Total votes		205,522	100.0
Democratic win (new boundaries)			

==== 2004 ====
2004 Colorado's 2nd congressional district election
Party	Candidate	Votes	%	±%
Democratic	Mark Udall (incumbent)	207,900	67.2	+7.1
Republican	Stephen Hackman	94,160	30.4	–6.3
Libertarian	Norm Olsen	7,304	2.4	+0.6
Majority		113,740	36.8	+13.4
Total votes		309,364	100.0	
Democratic hold		Swing	+6.7	

==== 2006 ====
2006 Colorado's 2nd congressional district election
Party	Candidate	Votes	%	±%
Democratic	Mark Udall (incumbent)	157,850	68.2	+1.0
Republican	Rich Mancuso	65,481	28.3	–2.2
Libertarian	Norm Olsen	5,025	2.2	–0.2
Green	J.A. Calhoun	2,951	1.3	N/a
Majority		92,369	39.9	+3.2
Total votes		231,307	100.0	
Democratic hold		Swing	+1.6	

==== 2008 ====
2008 Colorado's 2nd congressional district election
Party	Candidate	Votes	%	±%
Democratic	Jared Polis	215,602	62.6	–5.6
Republican	Scott Starin	116,619	33.9	+5.5
Green	J.A. Calhoun	10,031	2.9	+1.6
Unity	William Robert Hammons	2,176	0.6	N/a
Majority		98,983	28.7	–11.2
Total votes		344,428	100.0	
Democratic hold		Swing	–5.6	

==== 2010 ====
2010 Colorado's 2nd congressional district election
Party	Candidate	Votes	%	±%
Democratic	Jared Polis (incumbent)	148,768	57.4	–5.2
Republican	Stephen Bailey	98,194	37.9	+4.0
American Constitution	Jenna Goss	7,087	2.7	–0.2
Libertarian	Curtis Harris	5,060	2.0	N/a
Majority		50,574	19.5	–9.2
Total votes		259,116	100.0	
Democratic hold		Swing	–4.6	

=== 2012–2022 ===
==== 2012 ====
2012 Colorado's 2nd congressional district election
Party	Candidate	Votes	%
Democratic	Jared Polis (incumbent)	234,758	55.7
Republican	Kevin Lundberg	162,639	38.6
Libertarian	Randy Luallin	13,770	3.3
Green	Susan Hall	10,413	2.5
Majority		72,119	17.1
Total votes		421,580	100.0
Democratic win (new boundaries)			

==== 2014 ====
2014 Colorado's 2nd congressional district election
Party	Candidate	Votes	%	±%
Democratic	Jared Polis (incumbent)	196,300	56.7	+1.1
Republican	George Leing	149,645	43.3	+4.7
Majority		46,655	13.5	–3.6
Total votes		345,945	100.0	
Democratic hold		Swing	–1.8	

==== 2016 ====
2016 Colorado's 2nd congressional district election
Party	Candidate	Votes	%	±%
Democratic	Jared Polis (incumbent)	260,175	56.9	+0.1
Republican	Nicholas Morse	170,001	37.2	–6.1
Libertarian	Richard Longstreth	27,136	5.9	N/a
Majority		90,174	19.7	+6.2
Total votes		457,312	100.0	
Democratic hold		Swing	+3.1	

==== 2018 ====
2018 Colorado's 2nd congressional district election
Party	Candidate	Votes	%	±%
Democratic	Joe Neguse	259,608	60.3	+3.4
Republican	Peter Yu	144,901	33.6	–3.5
Independent	Nick Thomas	16,356	3.8	N/a
Libertarian	Roger Barris	9,749	2.3	–3.7
Majority		114,707	26.6	+6.9
Total votes		430,614	100.0	
Democratic hold		Swing	+3.5	

==== 2020 ====
2020 Colorado's 2nd congressional district election
Party	Candidate	Votes	%	±%
Democratic	Joe Neguse (incumbent)	316,925	61.5	+1.2
Republican	Charles Winn	182,547	35.4	+1.8
Libertarian	Thom Atkinson	13,657	2.6	+0.4
Unity	Gary Swing	2,534	0.5	N/a
Majority		134,378	26.6	–0.6
Total votes		515,663	100.0	
Democratic hold		Swing	–0.3	

=== 2022–2032 ===
==== 2022 ====
2022 Colorado's 2nd congressional district election
Party	Candidate	Votes	%
Democratic	Joe Neguse (incumbent)	244,107	70.0
Republican	Marshall Dawson	97,770	28.0
Center	Steve Yurash	2,876	0.8
American Constitution	Gary Nation	2,188	0.6
Unity	Tim Wolf	1,968	0.6
Majority		146,337	41.9
Total votes		348,839	100.0
Democratic win (new boundaries)			

==== 2024 ====
2024 Colorado's 2nd congressional district election
Party	Candidate	Votes	%	±%
Democratic	Joe Neguse (incumbent)	284,994	68.4	–1.6
Republican	Marshall Dawson	120,633	28.9	+0.9
Libertarian	Gaylon Kent	5,180	1.2	N/a
Unity	Cynthia Munhos de Aquino Sirianni	3,744	0.9	+0.3
Approval Voting	Jan Kok	2,349	0.6	N/a
Write-in		8	0.0	N/a
Majority		164,361	39.4	–2.5
Total votes		416,908	100.0	
Democratic hold		Swing	–1.3	

== Historical district boundaries ==
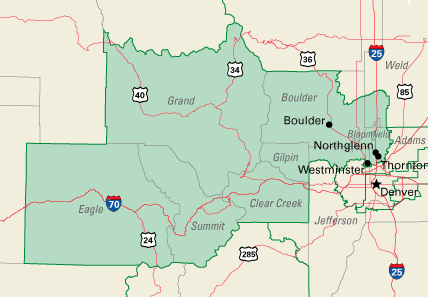
2003–2013

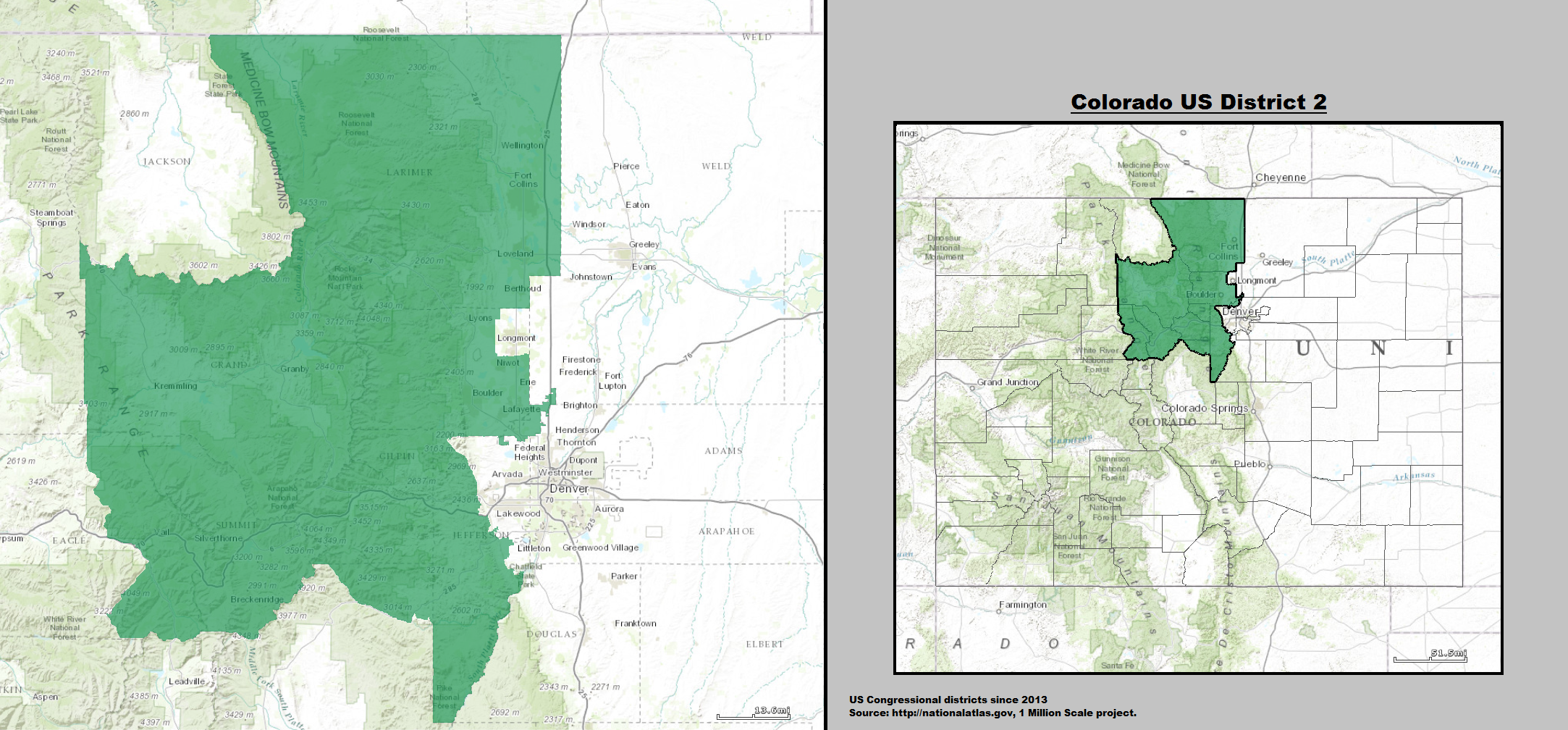
2013–2023

== See also ==
- Colorado's congressional districts
- List of United States congressional districts
