= Sunshine, Colorado =

Census-designated place in Boulder County, CO, USA

- Census-designated place
- Location of the Sunshine CDP in Boulder County, Colorado
- Coordinates: 40°03′53″N 105°22′34″W
- Country: United States
- State: Colorado
- County: Boulder County

Government
  - Type: unincorporated community

Area
  - Total: 1.730 sq mi (4.481 km^{2})
  - Land: 1.730 sq mi (4.481 km^{2})
  - Water: 0 sq mi (0.000 km^{2})
- Elevation: 7,346 ft (2,239 m)

Population (2020)
  - Total: 198
  - Density: 114/sq mi (44.2/km^{2})
- Time zone: UTC-7 (MST)
  - Summer (DST): UTC-6 (MDT)
- ZIP Code: Boulder 80302
- Area codes: 303 & 720
- GNIS feature ID: 2583302

Sunshine (also known as Sunshine Canyon) is an unincorporated community and a census-designated place (CDP) located in and governed by Boulder County, Colorado, United States. The CDP is a part of the Boulder, CO Metropolitan Statistical Area. The population of the Sunshine CDP was 198 at the United States Census 2020. The Boulder post office (Zip Code 80302) serves the area.

== History ==
Gold ore was discovered in Sunshine in 1873, and many prospectors moved to the area to seek their fortunes. By 1876 Sunshine was a booming mining camp, with a population of 1,200. Sunshine had a post office, a schoolhouse, a newspaper, The Sunshine Courier, several hotels and boarding houses, two mercantile firms, three blacksmiths, and two saloons.

Sunshine built a stone schoolhouse in 1900, which is still in good condition and used for community events. Noted for its sophisticated construction and neoclassical design, the building was placed on the National Register of Historic Places in 1989.

As gold became harder to find and extract, most mines shut down, and by 1908 Sunshine's population dwindled to about 200. Ranching was prevalent after World War I, with just a few mines still operating. The remaining mines were closed in July, 1942, by a decree of President Franklin D. Roosevelt, as the United States geared up for production of wartime materials.

== Geography ==
Sunshine is located in central Boulder County, in the hills northwest of the city of Boulder. It is bordered by the Crisman CDP to the south, and the Glendale and Lazy Acres CDPs are to the north.

The Sunshine CDP has an area of 1,107 acres (4.481 km^{2}), all land.

== Demographics ==
The United States Census Bureau initially defined the Sunshine CDP for the United States Census 2010.

Sunshine CDP, Colorado
Year	Pop.	±%
2010	230	—
2020	198	−13.9%
Source: United States Census Bureau

== See also ==
- Boulder, CO Metropolitan Statistical Area
