= Canfield, Colorado =

Unincorporated community in Boulder County, CO, USA

- Unincorporated community
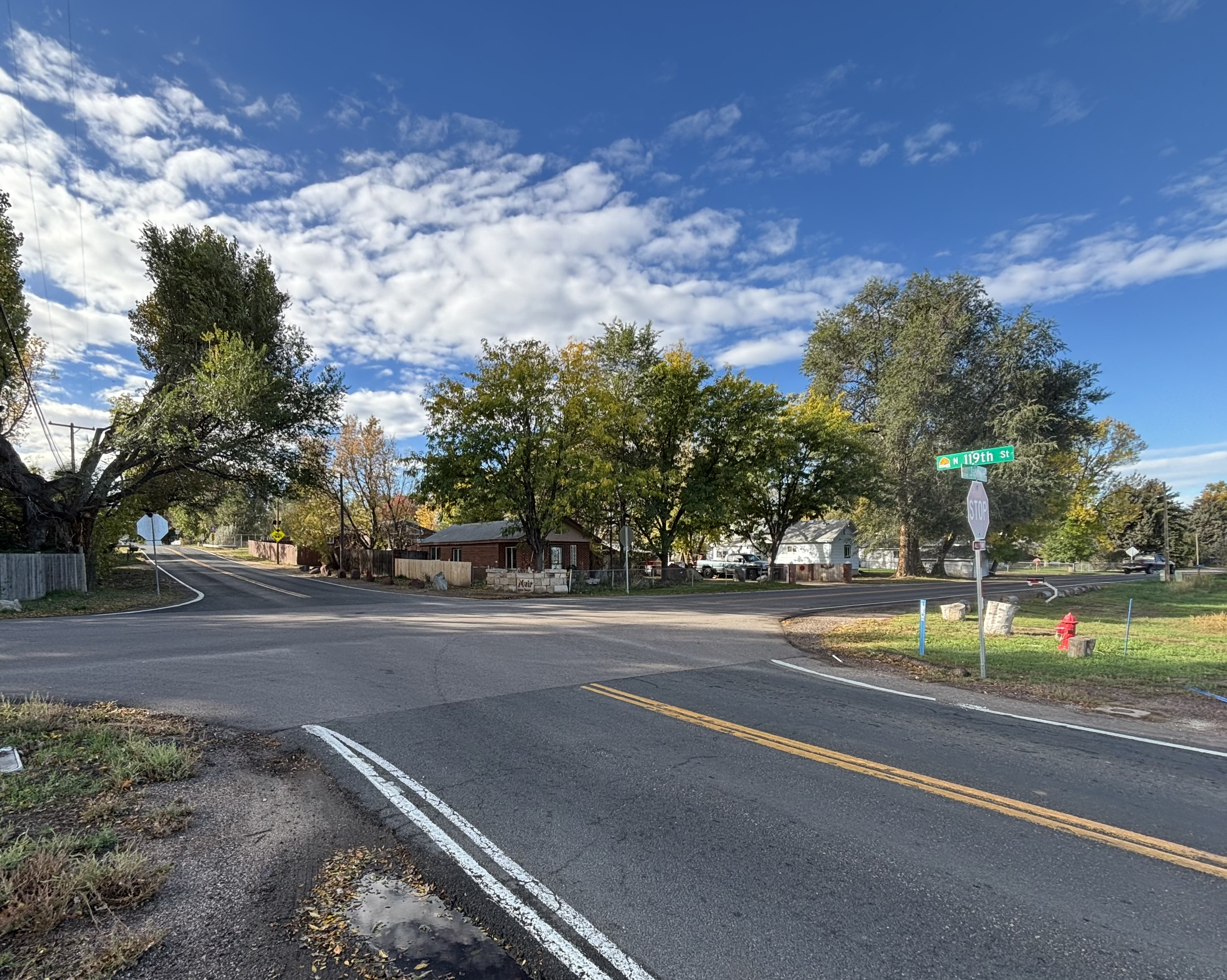
- Looking north at the rural intersection of 119th Street and Jasper Road in the Canfield area of Boulder County, Colorado.

- Location of Canfield, Colorado. Canfield (Colorado)
- Coordinates: 40°03′13″N 105°04′29″W
- Country: United States
- State: Colorado
- County: Boulder

Government
  - Type: unincorporated community
  - Body: Boulder County
- Elevation: 5,033 ft (1,534 m)
- Time zone: UTC−07:00 (MST)
  - Summer (DST): UTC−06:00 (MDT)
- Area codes: 303/720/983
- GNIS pop ID: 178599

Canfield is an unincorporated community in Boulder County, in the U.S. state of Colorado.

== History ==
The Canfield, Colorado, post office operated from March 28, 1878, until June 15, 1906. The community was named after Isaac Canfield, a businessman in the local coal mining industry.

== See also ==
- Boulder, CO Metropolitan Statistical Area
- Front Range Urban Corridor
