= Liggett, Colorado =

Unincorporated community in Boulder County, CO, USA

- Unincorporated community
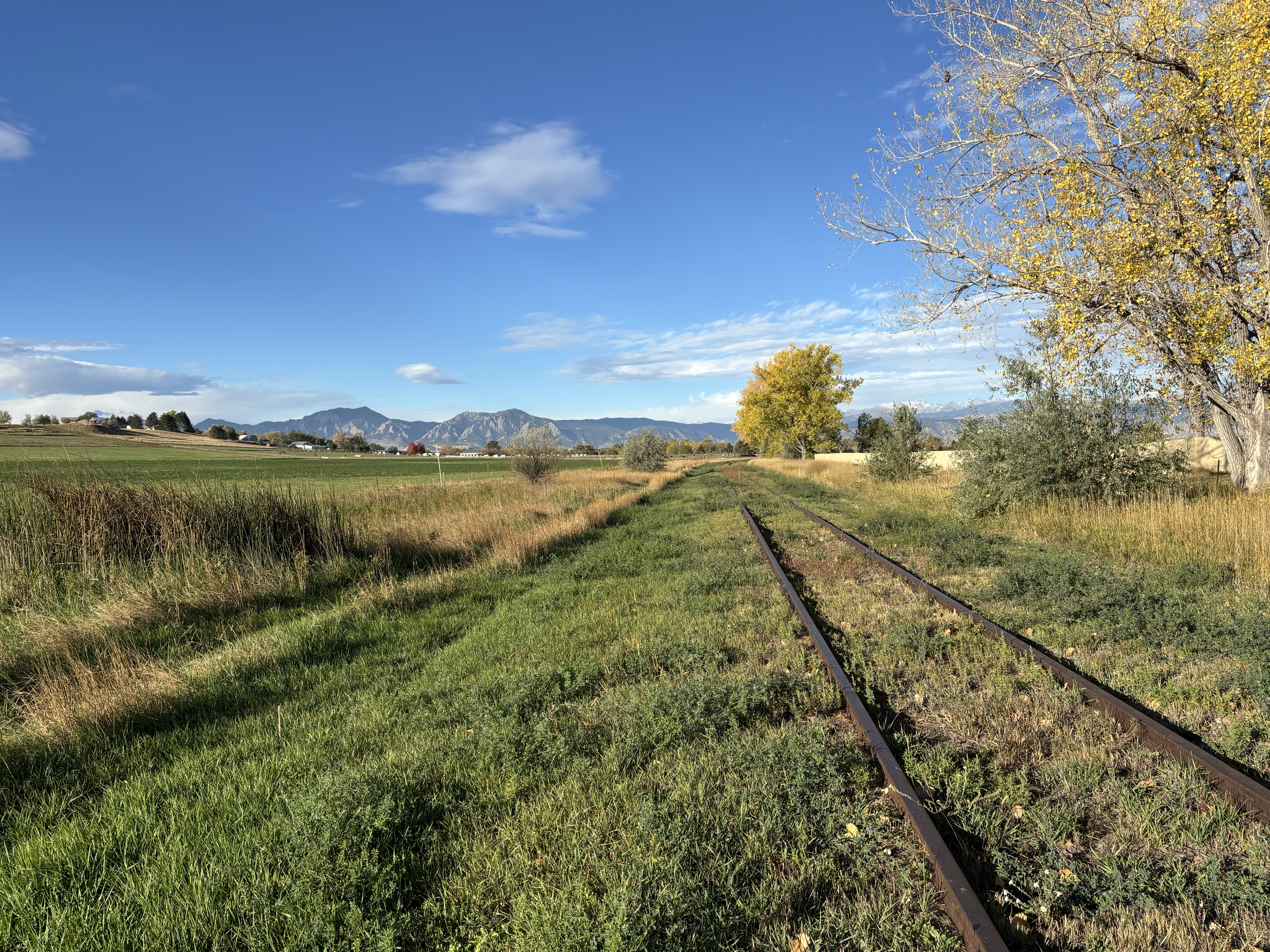
- Disused railroad tracks at the former Liggett siding near North 95th Street in Boulder County, Colorado, looking west toward the Flatirons with autumn cottonwoods.
- Interactive map of Liggett, Colorado
- Coordinates: 40°02′42″N 105°08′02″W
- Country: United States
- State: Colorado
- County: Boulder
- Elevation: 5,063 ft (1,543 m)
- Time zone: UTC-7 (Mountain (MST))
  - Summer (DST): UTC-6 (MDT)
- Postal code: 80301
- Area code: 720
- GNIS feature ID: 178718

Liggett is an unincorporated community in Boulder County, Colorado, United States. It is to the northwest of Lafayette.

== Description ==
Liggett is mostly rural grassland, with a few buildings. Nearby are two lakes, Boulder Creek, and a former Union Pacific rail line currently owned by the Regional Transportation District. Directly to the west of Liggett is 95th Street, heading south to Lafayette and north to Longmont. A second road, Valmont Road, terminates at 95th Street and heads west to Boulder.

The post office in Boulder serves Liggett addresses.

== History ==
Liggett was established prior to 1904, and was originally known as White Rock. The name was changed to Liggett sometime between 1945 and 1957. The railway was built through the area in the early 1870s by the Denver & Boulder Valley Railroad, and connected Boulder to Brighton.

The rail line was acquired by the Union Pacific Railroad via a merger in 1898, and later bought by the Regional Transportation District in 2009.

== Name ==
The origin is not known for certain, but the community is possibly named after Liggett, Indiana.
