= Gooding, Colorado =

Unincorporated community in Boulder County, CO, USA

- Unincorporated community
- Location within Colorado Location within the United States
- Coordinates: 40°04′25″N 105°04′59″W
- Country: United States
- State: Colorado
- County: Boulder
- Elevation: 4,994 ft (1,522 m)
- Time zone: UTC-7 (Mountain (MST))
  - Summer (DST): UTC-6 (MDT)
- Area codes: 303 & 720
- GNIS feature ID: 178727

Gooding is an unincorporated community in Boulder County, Colorado, United States.

== History ==
The Gooding School was established sometime between 1945 and 1956, near the banks of Boulder Creek. Gooding did not appear on topographic maps as a settlement until 1967.
