= Smeltertown, Colorado =

Census-designated place in Chaffee County, CO, USA

- Census-designated place
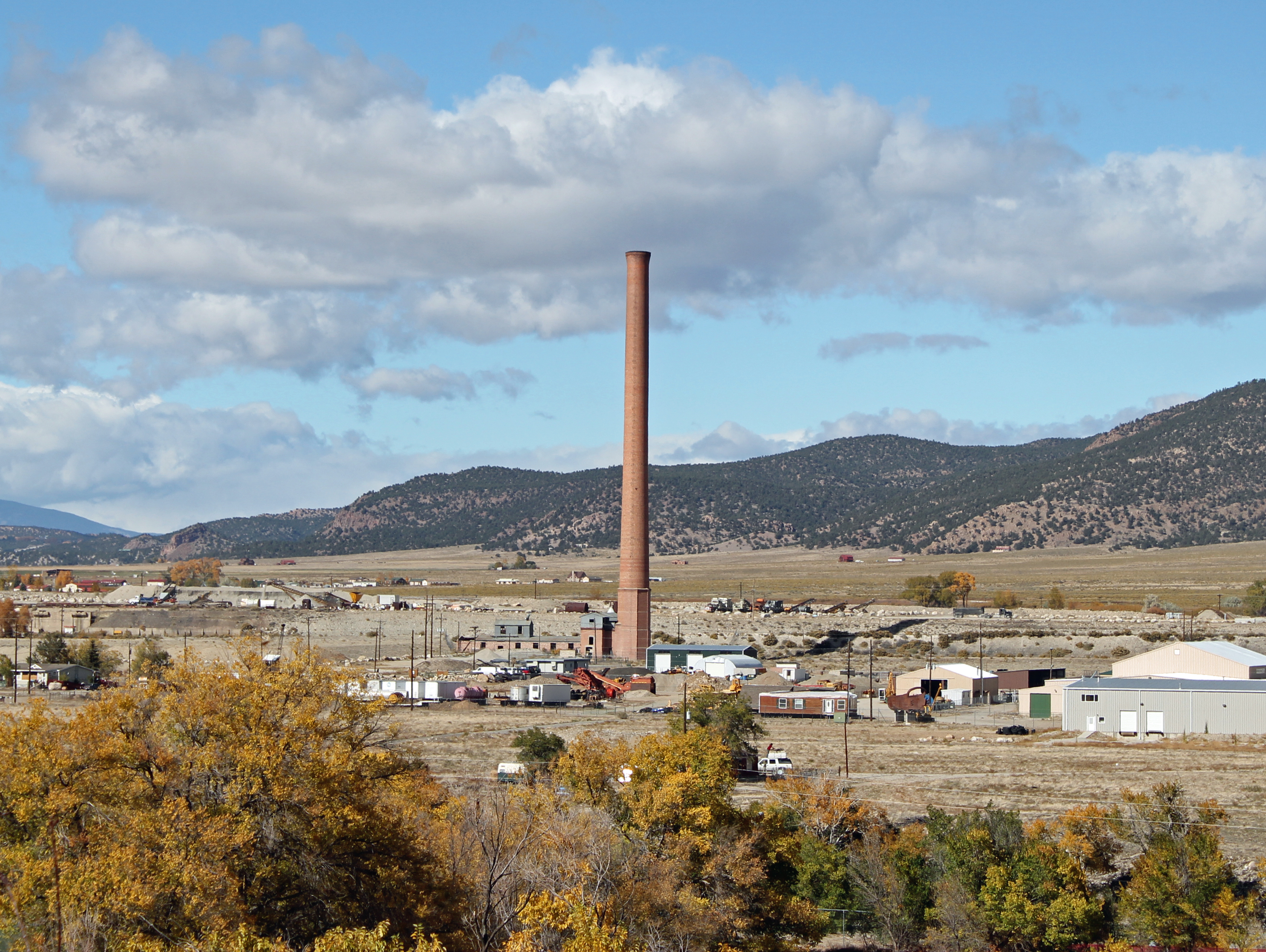
- The old Ohio-Colorado Smelting and Refining Company Smokestack is located in Smeltertown.

- Location of the Smeltertown CDP in Chaffee County, Colorado.
- Coordinates: 38°33′08″N 106°00′30″W
- Country: United States
- State: Colorado
- County: Chaffee

Government
  - Type: Unincorporated community

Area
  - Total: 0.146 sq mi (0.378 km^{2})
  - Land: 0.146 sq mi (0.378 km^{2})
  - Water: 0 sq mi (0.000 km^{2})
- Elevation: 7,143 ft (2,177 m)

Population (2020)
  - Total: 88
  - Density: 600/sq mi (230/km^{2})
- Time zone: UTC-7 (MST)
  - Summer (DST): UTC-6 (MDT)
- ZIP Code: Salida 81201
- Area code: 719
- GNIS feature ID: 2583297

Smeltertown is an unincorporated community and a census-designated place (CDP) located in and governed by Chaffee County, Colorado, United States. The population of the Smeltertown CDP was 88 at the United States Census 2020. The Salida post office (Zip Code 81201) serves the area.

== Geography ==
The Smeltertown CDP has an area of 93 acres (0.378 km^{2}), all land.

== Demographics ==
The United States Census Bureau initially defined the Smeltertown CDP for the United States Census 2010.

Smeltertown CDP, Colorado
Year	Pop.	±%
2010	120	—
2020	88	−26.7%
Source: United States Census Bureau

== See also ==
- Colorado census designated places
