= Bonanza Mountain Estates, Colorado =

Census-designated place in Boulder County, Colorado, United States

- Census-designated place
- Location of the Bonanza Mountain Estates CDP in Boulder County, Colorado
- Coordinates: 39°58′37″N 105°28′46″W
- Country: United States
- State: Colorado
- County: Boulder

Government
  - Type: Unincorporated community
  - Body: Boulder County

Area
  - Total: 0.168 sq mi (0.436 km^{2})
  - Land: 0.168 sq mi (0.436 km^{2})
  - Water: 0 sq mi (0.000 km^{2})
- Elevation: 8,449 ft (2,575 m)

Population (2020)
  - Total: 127
  - Density: 754/sq mi (291/km^{2})
- Time zone: UTC−07:00 (MST)
  - Summer (DST): UTC−06:00 (MDT)
- ZIP Code: Nederland 80466
- Area codes: 303/720/983
- GNIS town ID: 2583214}
- FIPS code: 08-07580

Bonanza Mountain Estates is an unincorporated community and a census-designated place (CDP) located in Boulder County, Colorado, United States. The CDP is a part of the Boulder, CO Metropolitan Statistical Area. The population of the Bonanza Mountain Estates CDP was 127 at the United States Census 2020. The Nederland post office (Zip Code 80466) serves the area.

== Geography ==
The CDP is a residential community located in southern Boulder County in the Front Range of the Colorado Rocky Mountains, just east of the town of Nederland. It is situated on a ridge between Middle Boulder Creek and North Boulder Creek. Ridge Road is the main street through the community, leading west to Nederland and east to St. Ann Highlands.

At the 2020 United States Census, the Bonanza Mountain Estates CDP had an area of 108 acres (0.436 km^{2}), all land.

== Demographics ==
The United States Census Bureau initially defined the Bonanza Mountain Estates CDP for the United States Census 2010.

Bonanza Mountain Estates CDP, Colorado
Year	Pop.	±%
2010	128	—
2020	127	−0.8%
Source: United States Census Bureau

== See also ==
- Front Range Urban Corridor
