= Glendale, Boulder County, Colorado =

Census-designated place in Boulder County, CO, USA

Glendale CDP, Colorado
- Census-designated place
- Location of the Glendale CDP in Boulder County, Colorado
- Coordinates: 40°05′14″N 105°22′31″W
- Country: United States
- State: Colorado
- County: Boulder County

Government
  - Type: unincorporated community

Area
  - Total: 1.255 sq mi (3.251 km^{2})
  - Land: 1.255 sq mi (3.251 km^{2})
  - Water: 0 sq mi (0.000 km^{2})
- Elevation: 7,359 ft (2,243 m)

Population (2020)
  - Total: 64
  - Density: 51/sq mi (20/km^{2})
- Time zone: UTC-7 (MST)
  - Summer (DST): UTC-6 (MDT)
- ZIP Code: Jamestown 80455
- Area codes: 303 & 720
- GNIS feature ID: 2583240

Glendale is an unincorporated community and a census-designated place (CDP) located in and governed by Boulder County, Colorado, United States. The CDP is a part of the Boulder, CO Metropolitan Statistical Area. The population of the Glendale CDP was 64 at the United States Census 2020. The Jamestown post office (Zip Code 80455) serves the area.

== Geography ==
Glendale is located in central Boulder County in the Front Range of the Colorado Rocky Mountains, in the valley of Left Hand Creek. Lefthand Canyon Drive leads east 7 miles (11 km) to Altona and U.S. Highway 36, and west 9 miles (14 km) to Ward and State Highway 72.

The Glendale CDP has an area of 803 acres (3.251 km^{2}), all land.

== Demographics ==
The United States Census Bureau initially defined the Glendale CDP for the United States Census 2010.

Glendale CDP, Colorado
Year	Pop.	±%
2010	69	—
2020	64	−7.2%
Source: United States Census Bureau

== See also ==
- Boulder, CO Metropolitan Statistical Area
