= Marfell Lakes =

Reservoirs in Boulder County, Colorado, USA

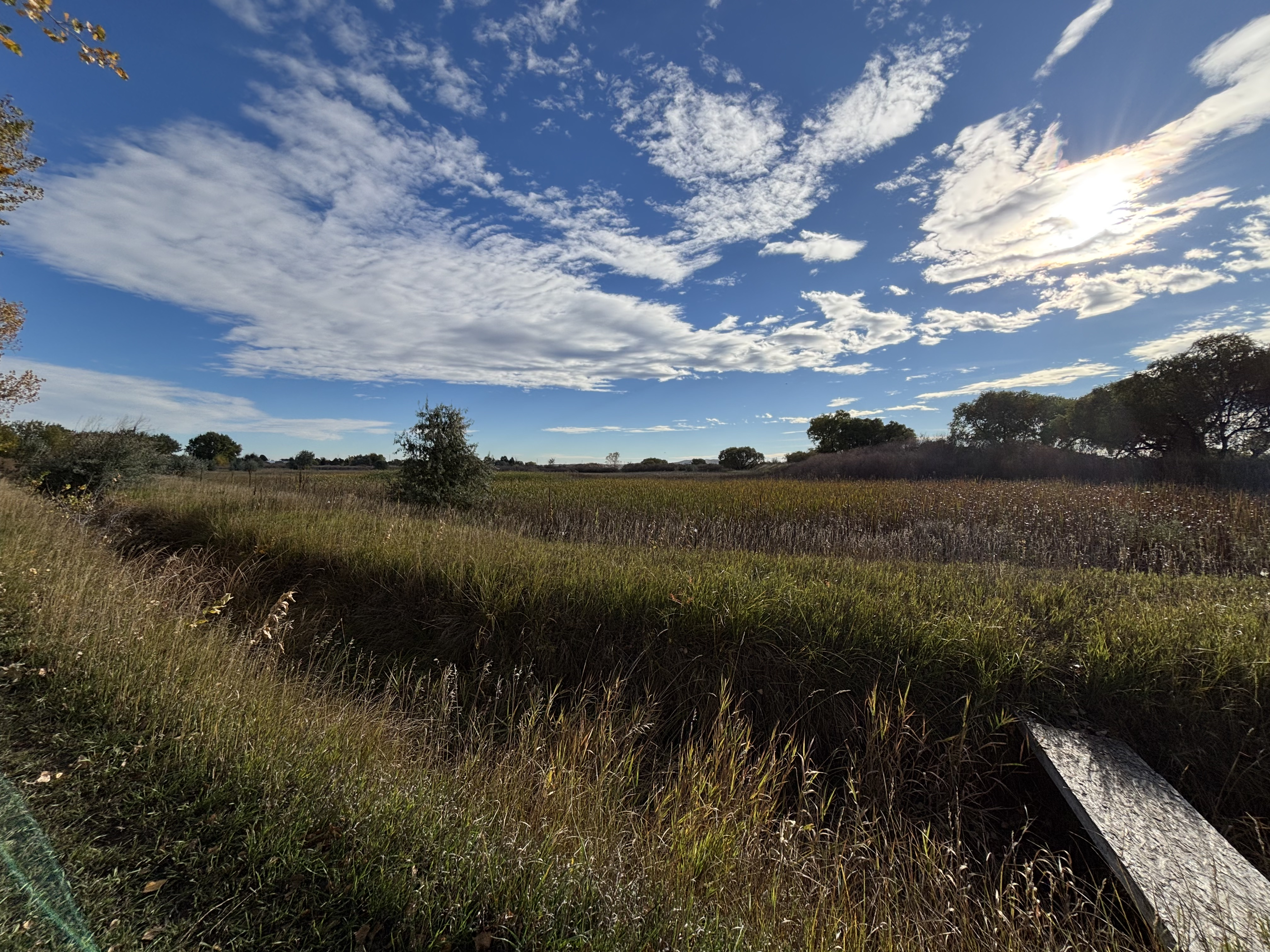
- View across the marsh at Marfell Lakes from Lakota Ranch Road near Erie, Colorado, showing autumn grasses, scattered trees, and dramatic morning clouds.

- Location within Colorado Location within the United States
- Location: Boulder County, Colorado
- Coordinates: 40.0192°N 105.0797°W
- Surface elevation: 5,223 feet (1,592 m)

The Marfell Lakes (1 and 2) are reservoirs in Boulder County near Lafayette-Louisville in the U.S. state of Colorado. The altitude is 5,223 feet (1,592 m).
