= Seven Hills, Colorado =

Census-designated place in Boulder County, CO, USA

- Census-designated place
- Location of the Seven Hills CDP in Boulder County, Colorado
- Coordinates: 40°02′10″N 105°19′56″W
- Country: United States
- State: Colorado
- County: Boulder County

Government
  - Type: unincorporated community

Area
  - Total: 0.489 sq mi (1.267 km^{2})
  - Land: 0.489 sq mi (1.266 km^{2})
  - Water: 0.00031 sq mi (0.0008 km^{2})
- Elevation: 6,447 ft (1,965 m)

Population (2020)
  - Total: 129
  - Density: 264/sq mi (102/km^{2})
- Time zone: UTC-7 (MST)
  - Summer (DST): UTC-6 (MDT)
- ZIP Code: Boulder 80302
- Area codes: 303 & 720
- GNIS feature ID: 2583293

Seven Hills is an unincorporated community and a census-designated place (CDP) located in and governed by Boulder County, Colorado, United States. The CDP is a part of the Boulder, CO Metropolitan Statistical Area. The population of the Seven Hills CDP was 129 at the United States Census 2020. The Boulder post office (Zip Code 80302) serves the area.

== Geography ==
Seven Hills is located in central Boulder County, in the hills west of the city of Boulder. It lies between Sunshine Canyon Drive, which forms the northeast edge of the CDP, and Fourmile Canyon Drive, which touches the southwest edge of the CDP. Elevations range from 6,050 feet (1,840 m) at Fourmile Canyon Drive to 6,780 feet (2,070 m) along Sunshine Canyon Drive. Poorman Road connects the two drives, running through the center of the CDP.

The Seven Hills CDP has an area of 313 acres (1.267 km^{2}), including 0.20 acres (0.0008 km^{2}) of water.

== Demographics ==
The United States Census Bureau initially defined the Seven Hills CDP for the United States Census 2010.

Seven Hills CDP, Colorado
Year	Pop.	±%
2010	121	—
2020	129	+6.6%
Source: United States Census Bureau

== See also ==
- Boulder, CO Metropolitan Statistical Area
