= Tall Timber, Colorado =

Census-designated place in Boulder County, CO, USA

- Census-designated place
- Location of the Tall Timber CDP in Boulder County, Colorado
- Coordinates: 40°00′55″N 105°20′59″W
- Country: United States
- State: Colorado
- County: Boulder

Government
  - Type: unincorporated community

Area
  - Total: 0.574 sq mi (1.487 km^{2})
  - Land: 0.574 sq mi (1.487 km^{2})
  - Water: 0 sq mi (0.000 km^{2})
- Elevation: 6,418 ft (1,956 m)

Population (2020)
  - Total: 185
  - Density: 322/sq mi (124/km^{2})
- Time zone: UTC-7 (MST)
  - Summer (DST): UTC-6 (MDT)
- ZIP Code: Boulder 80302
- Area codes: 303 & 720
- GNIS feature ID: 2583304

Tall Timber is an unincorporated community and a census-designated place (CDP) located in and governed by Boulder County, Colorado, United States. The CDP is a part of the Boulder, CO Metropolitan Statistical Area. The population of the Tall Timber CDP was 185 at the United States Census 2020. The Boulder post office (Zip Code 80302) serves the area.

== Geography ==
Tall Timber is located in central Boulder County, in the hills west of the city of Boulder. Sugarloaf Road runs through the center of the CDP, leading south to State Highway 119 (Boulder Canyon Drive) and west to Sugarloaf and eventually the Peak to Peak Highway.

The Tall Timber CDP has an area of 367 acres (1.487 km^{2}), all land.

== Demographics ==
The United States Census Bureau initially defined the Tall Timber CDP for the United States Census 2010.

Tall Timber CDP, Colorado
| Year | Pop. | ±% |
|---|---|---|
| 2010 | 208 | — |
| 2020 | 185 | −11.1% |
Source: United States Census Bureau

== See also ==
- Boulder, CO Metropolitan Statistical Area
