= Boulder County, Colorado =

County in Colorado, United States

- County
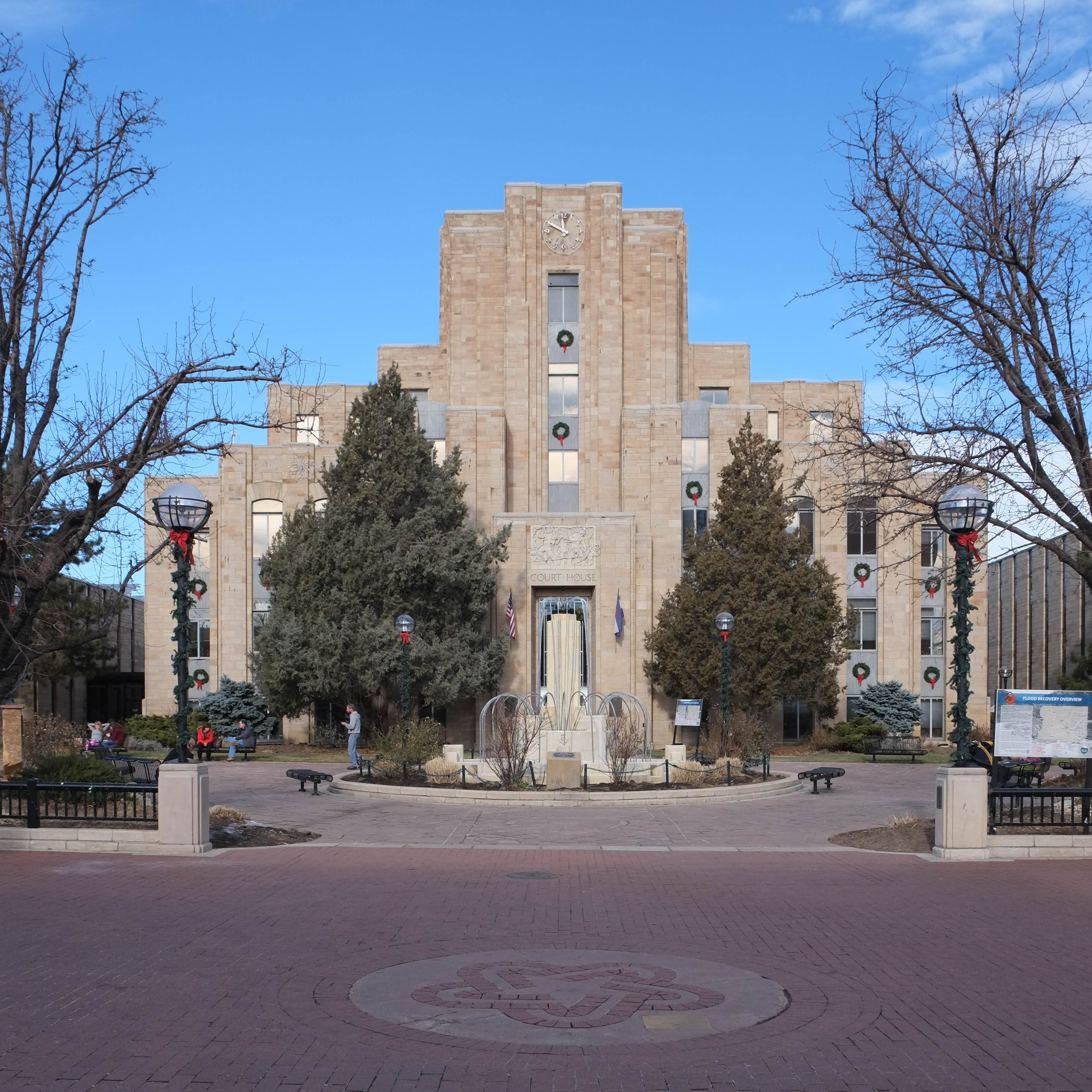
- Boulder County Courthouse

- Seal

- Location within the U.S. state of Colorado
- Coordinates: 40.09°N 105.36°W
- Country: United States
- State: Colorado
- Founded: November 1, 1861
- Named for: large granite boulders in area
- Seat: Boulder
- Largest city: Boulder

Area
  - Total: 740 sq mi (1,900 km^{2})
  - Land: 726 sq mi (1,880 km^{2})
  - Water: 14 sq mi (36 km^{2}) 1.9%

Population (2020)
  - Total: 330,758
  - Estimate (2025): 328,560 ▼
  - Density: 456/sq mi (176/km^{2})
- Time zone: UTC−7 (Mountain)
  - Summer (DST): UTC−6 (MDT)
- Congressional districts: 2nd, 4th
- Website: www.bouldercounty.org

Boulder County is a county located in the U.S. state of Colorado. As of the 2020 census, the population was 330,758. The most populous municipality in the county and the county seat is Boulder. Boulder County comprises the Boulder, Colorado Metropolitan Statistical Area, which is included in the 12-county Denver-Aurora-Greeley, CO Combined Statistical Area.

== History ==
Boulder County was one of the original 17 counties created by the Territory of Colorado on November 1, 1861. The county was named for Boulder City and Boulder Creek, so named because of the abundance of boulders in the creek which hampered early gold prospecting efforts. Boulder County retains essentially the same borders as in 1861, although a 27.5 square miles (71.2 km^{2}) of its southeastern corner and its approximate population of 40,000 became part of the City and County of Broomfield in 2001.

Before the arrival of the first US settlers, the area was occupied by Native Americans led by Chief Niwot on the plains and seasonally by Utes in the mountains to the west. The first European American settlers were gold prospectors led by Captain Thomas Aikins. His group of about twenty settled at the mouth of Boulder Creek Canyon on October 17, 1858. Chief Niwot told them not to stay and it is said they promised to move into the mountains to prospect in the spring. However, in February 1859, they founded the town of Boulder. At about the same time, they also founded the first Gold Mining town in what would become Colorado, Gold Hill which is about 10 miles west from Boulder. Gold Hill was founded because of the placer gold discovered there. The area was the site of the first commercial scale placer mine in Colorado, producing over 5,500 ounces of gold in the first year of operations (1859).

In late December 2021, the Marshall Fire raged through the parched lands near Boulder, Colorado. Marshall Fire is the most destructive in Colorado's history. The fire impacted City of Superior, City of Louisville and unincorporated Boulder County areas. 991 homes were destroyed with an additional 127 damaged. Over 13,000 people in Superior and 21,000 in Louisville were ultimately evacuated while the fire was spreading due to unusual 100 mile per hour winds. Additionally, one person died and another is missing and presumed dead. The cause of the fire has not been officially announced, pending an investigation. However, an incident report filed by a ranger with Boulder Open Space and Mountain Parks identified two ignition points for the fire. The first ignition point was a shed that began to burn at approximately 11:30AM MST, December 30, 2021. The second ignition point was upwind from the first, and started around noon of the same day on "western side of the Marshall Mesa trailhead".

== Geography ==
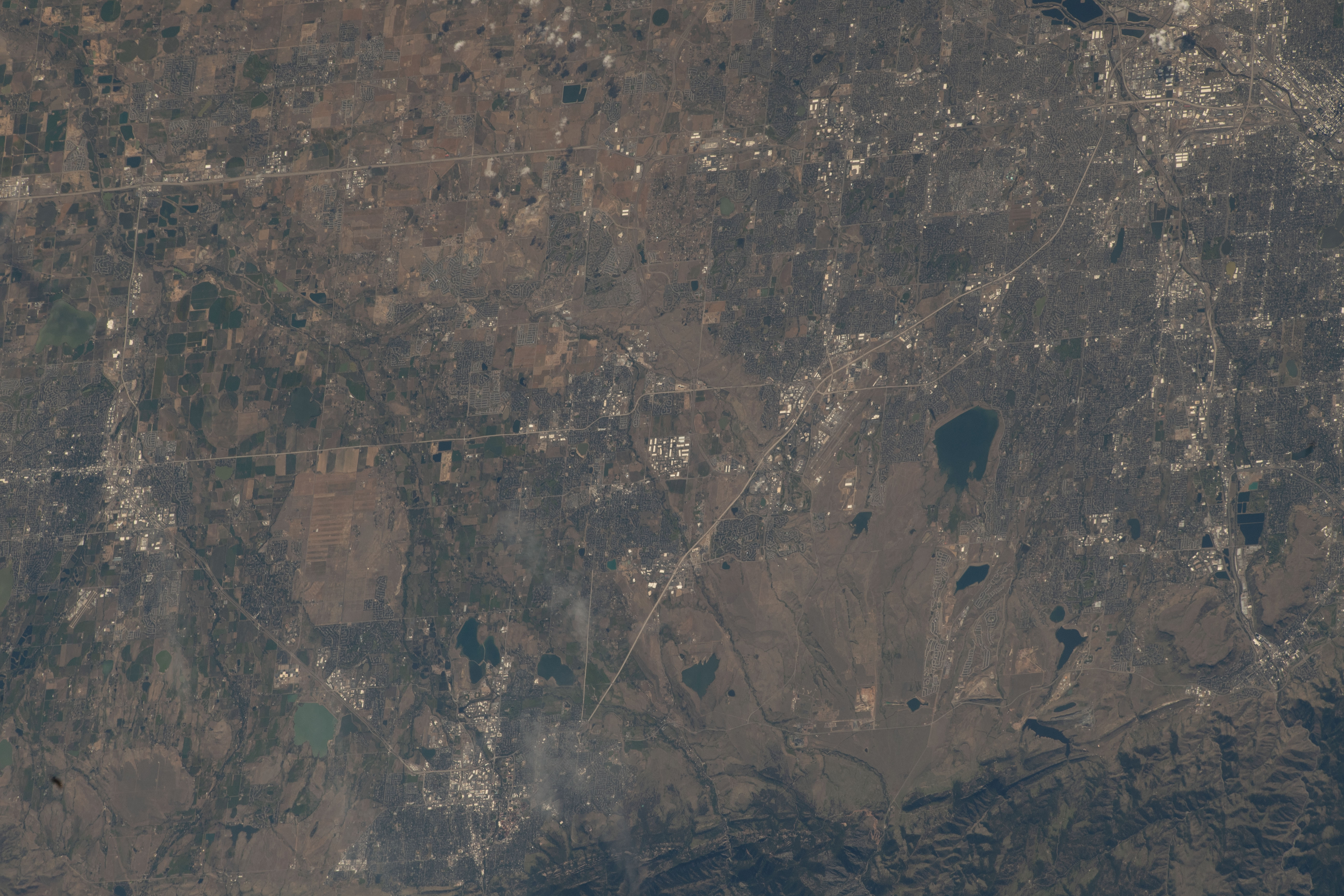
View of the eastern and southern borders of Boulder County and adjacent areas in Weld, Broomfield, and Jefferson counties, with north oriented to the left. The city of Boulder is near the lower border. Taken from the International Space Station on July 1, 2022.

According to the U.S. Census Bureau, the county has a total area of 740 square miles (1,900 km^{2}), of which 726 square miles (1,880 km^{2}) is land and 14 square miles (36 km^{2}) (1.9%) is water.

=== Adjacent counties ===
- Larimer County, Colorado – north
- Weld County, Colorado – east
- City and County of Broomfield, Colorado – southeast
- Jefferson County, Colorado – south
- Gilpin County, Colorado – south
- Grand County, Colorado – west

=== Major highways ===
- U.S. Highway 36 (Denver-Boulder Turnpike)
- U.S. Highway 287
- State Highway 7
- State Highway 42
- State Highway 52
- State Highway 66
- State Highway 72
- State Highway 93
- State Highway 119
- State Highway 170
- Northwest Parkway (tollway)

=== National protected areas ===
- Arapaho National Forest
- Roosevelt National Forest
- Indian Peaks Wilderness
- James Peak Wilderness

Rocky Mountain National Park is in Boulder County, Larimer County, and Grand County. Longs Peak, the park's highest summit at 4,345 meters (14,255 feet) elevation, is located in Boulder County.

=== State protected area ===
- Eldorado Canyon State Park

=== Scenic trails and byways ===
- Continental Divide National Scenic Trail
- Peak to Peak Scenic and Historic Byway

=== Historic district ===
- Colorado Chautauqua National Historic District
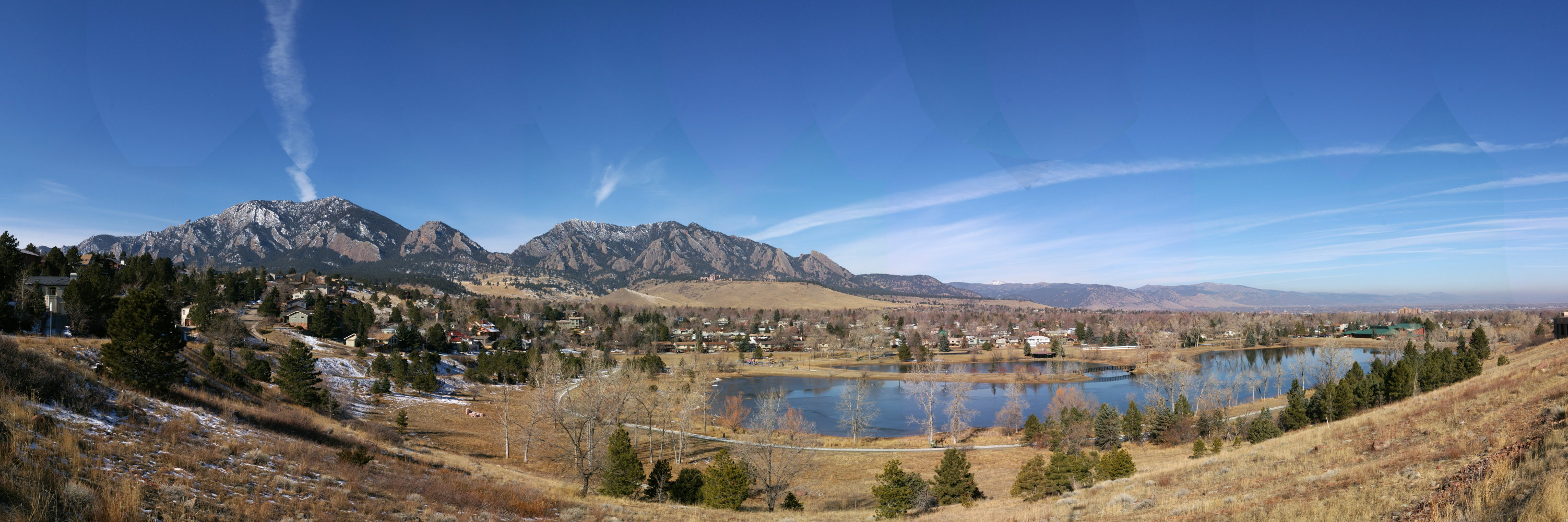
Boulder and the mountains to the west of the city

== Demographics ==
Historical population
Census	Pop.	Note	%±
1870	1,939		—
1880	9,723		401.4%
1890	14,082		44.8%
1900	21,544		53.0%
1910	30,330		40.8%
1920	31,861		5.0%
1930	32,456		1.9%
1940	37,438		15.4%
1950	48,296		29.0%
1960	74,254		53.7%
1970	131,889		77.6%
1980	189,625		43.8%
1990	226,374		19.4%
2000	271,651		20.0%
2010	294,567		8.4%
2020	330,758		12.3%
2025 (est.)	328,560	▼	−0.7%
U.S. Decennial Census; 1790-1960 1900-1990; 1990-2000 2010-2020

=== 2020 census ===
As of the 2020 census, the county had a population of 330,758. Of the residents, 18.8% were under the age of 18 and 15.5% were 65 years of age or older; the median age was 37.6 years. For every 100 females there were 101.7 males, and for every 100 females age 18 and over there were 100.7 males. 90.6% of residents lived in urban areas and 9.4% lived in rural areas.

Boulder County, Colorado – Racial and ethnic composition Note: the US Census treats Hispanic/Latino as an ethnic category. This table excludes Latinos from the racial categories and assigns them to a separate category. Hispanics/Latinos may be of any race.
Race / Ethnicity (NH = Non-Hispanic)	Pop 2000	Pop 2010	Pop 2020	% 2000	% 2010	% 2020
White alone (NH)	243,512	233,741	245,203	83.60%	79.35%	74.13%
Black or African American alone (NH)	2,393	2,265	3,149	0.82%	0.77%	0.95%
Native American or Alaska Native alone (NH)	1,206	1,061	1,112	0.41%	0.36%	0.34%
Asian alone (NH)	8,834	11,996	16,291	3.03%	4.07%	4.93%
Pacific Islander alone (NH)	147	153	241	0.05%	0.05%	0.07%
Other race alone (NH)	439	478	1,820	0.15%	0.16%	0.55%
Mixed race or Multiracial (NH)	4,301	5,597	14,774	1.48%	1.90%	4.47%
Hispanic or Latino (any race)	30,456	39,276	48,168	10.46%	13.33%	14.56%
Total	291,288	294,567	330,758	100.00%	100.00%	100.00%

The racial makeup of the county was 77.4% White, 1.0% Black or African American, 0.8% American Indian and Alaska Native, 5.0% Asian, 0.1% Native Hawaiian and Pacific Islander, 5.8% from some other race, and 10.0% from two or more races. Hispanic or Latino people of any race comprised 14.6% of the population.

There were 132,551 households in the county, of which 26.4% had children under the age of 18 living with them and 25.2% had a female householder with no spouse or partner present. About 28.7% of all households were made up of individuals and 10.1% had someone living alone who was 65 years of age or older.

There were 140,848 housing units, of which 5.9% were vacant. Among occupied housing units, 61.0% were owner-occupied and 39.0% were renter-occupied. The homeowner vacancy rate was 0.9% and the rental vacancy rate was 5.1%.

=== 2000 census ===
As of the 2000 census, there were 271,651 people, 114,680 households, and 68,808 families residing in the county. The population density was 392 people per square mile (151 people/km^{2}). There were 119,900 housing units at an average density of 162 per square mile (63/km^{2}). The racial makeup of the county was 88.54% White, 0.88% Black or African American, 0.61% Native American, 3.06% Asian, 0.06% Pacific Islander, 4.67% from other races, and 2.18% from two or more races. 10.46% of the population were Hispanic or Latino of any race.

There were 114,680 households, out of which 30.70% had children under the age of 18 living with them, 48.90% were married couples living together, 7.70% had a female householder with no husband present, and 40.00% were non-families. 26.30% of all households were made up of individuals, and 5.50% had someone living alone who was 65 years of age or older. The average household size was 2.47 and the average family size was 3.03.

In the county, the population was spread out, with 22.90% under the age of 18, 13.40% from 18 to 24, 33.60% from 25 to 44, 22.30% from 45 to 64, and 7.80% who were 65 years of age or older. The median age was 33 years. For every 100 females, there were 102.20 males. For every 100 females age 18 and over, there were 101.70 males.

=== Income and rankings ===
In 2014, the median income for a household in the county was $69,407, and the median income for a family was $94,938. Males had a median income of $65,489 versus $48,140 for females. About 7.0% of families and 14.6% of the population were below the poverty line, including 14.6% of those under age 18 and 5.9% of those age 65 or over.

In 2017, Bloomberg ranked the Boulder metropolitan area as the top "brain" area in the US.

== Government ==
Boulder County is divided into three districts each represented by a commissioner elected county-wide. The three commissioners comprise the county Board of Commissioners and represent the county as a whole. Each commissioner must reside in their respective district and may be elected to a maximum of two four-year terms.

The Board of County Commissioners are full-time public servants and approve the budget for the entire County government. The Board also oversees the management of 10 County departments and the daily operations of the county, work that is done by a county manager or a chief administrative officer in some counties.

Boulder County has seven other county-wide elected officials, including the District Attorney, who represents the 20th Judicial District.

=== Elected officials ===
Name	Office	Year term began	Year re-elected
Claire Levy	County Commissioner	2021	
Marta Loachamin	County Commissioner	2021	
Ashley Stolzmann	County Commissioner	2023	
Cynthia Braddock	Assessor	2017	2018, 2023
Molly Fitzpatrick	Clerk and Recorder	2018	2023
Jeff Martin	Coroner	2024	
Curtis Johnson	Sheriff	2023	
Lee Stadele	Surveyor	2015	2018, 2023
Paul Weissmann	Treasurer	2015	2018, 2023

Boulder County is coterminous with the 20th Judicial District, which is represented by District Attorney Michael Dougherty.

== Politics ==
Boulder County went Republican in all but three presidential elections from 1920 to 1984, the exceptions being the national Democratic landslides of 1932, 1936 and 1964. However, it has swung heavily to the Democrats since the late 1980s, and has supported Democrats at every election since 1988. Since the 1990s, it has become one of the most liberal counties in Colorado; in most years, it is the second-strongest Democratic bastion in the state, behind only the City and County of Denver. The GOP has not crossed the 40% mark in the county since 1988. This tracks closely with the Democratic trend in other counties dominated by college towns.

In recent years, Republican vote share has significantly declined. Republicans took less than 28% of the vote in Boulder County in both 2008 and 2012, only 22% in 2016, and just over 20% in 2020 and 2024.

In 2020, Joe Biden received over 77% of the vote, the best performance for a Democrat since 1896. Unlike the national trend, Boulder shifted right by just 1% in the 2024 election. Kamala Harris received 76.5% of the vote in 2024, which with the exception of 2020, was also a record performance for a Democrat in the county.

In 2000, Green Party presidential candidate Ralph Nader took 11.82% of the vote in Boulder County, more than twice the 5.25% he took statewide in Colorado, and more than four times his 2.73% nationwide vote share.

The cities of Boulder and Longmont are Democratic strongholds, as well as all the mountain towns to the west within the county. In fact, every precinct within the county is majority-Democratic, and most by heavy margins, save one rural plains region in the far northeast corner of the county, north of Longmont, which leans slightly Republican.

United States presidential election results for Boulder County, Colorado
Year	Republican		Democratic		Third party(ies)	
Year	No.	%	No.	%	No.	%
1880	1,313	54.66%	796	33.14%	293	12.20%
1884	1,445	51.59%	954	34.06%	402	14.35%
1888	1,639	54.98%	1,176	39.45%	166	5.57%
1892	1,338	36.42%	0	0.00%	2,336	63.58%
1896	1,033	14.33%	6,046	83.87%	130	1.80%
1900	3,719	40.57%	5,117	55.81%	332	3.62%
1904	5,483	53.90%	4,030	39.62%	659	6.48%
1908	4,856	41.76%	5,772	49.63%	1,001	8.61%
1912	2,445	23.02%	4,330	40.77%	3,845	36.21%
1916	3,986	33.02%	7,419	61.46%	666	5.52%
1920	6,456	57.91%	4,200	37.67%	492	4.41%
1924	7,595	58.75%	3,273	25.32%	2,059	15.93%
1928	9,457	67.48%	4,363	31.13%	195	1.39%
1932	7,487	44.81%	8,412	50.35%	808	4.84%
1936	7,244	41.39%	9,788	55.93%	469	2.68%
1940	10,525	53.22%	9,039	45.71%	212	1.07%
1944	10,054	57.09%	7,442	42.26%	114	0.65%
1948	10,335	52.09%	8,792	44.32%	712	3.59%
1952	15,069	65.29%	7,767	33.65%	243	1.05%
1956	16,748	66.89%	8,149	32.55%	142	0.57%
1960	19,791	61.47%	12,276	38.13%	130	0.40%
1964	17,373	43.08%	22,737	56.38%	220	0.55%
1968	27,671	57.66%	17,422	36.30%	2,895	6.03%
1972	40,766	56.80%	29,484	41.08%	1,520	2.12%
1976	42,830	52.71%	33,284	40.96%	5,139	6.32%
1980	40,698	46.74%	28,422	32.64%	17,949	20.61%
1984	53,535	55.06%	42,195	43.40%	1,493	1.54%
1988	48,174	44.93%	57,265	53.41%	1,784	1.66%
1992	33,553	26.47%	64,567	50.93%	28,651	22.60%
1996	41,922	34.55%	63,316	52.17%	16,116	13.28%
2000	50,873	36.44%	69,983	50.12%	18,770	13.44%
2004	51,586	32.39%	105,564	66.28%	2,109	1.32%
2008	44,904	26.14%	124,159	72.29%	2,700	1.57%
2012	49,981	27.84%	125,091	69.69%	4,427	2.47%
2016	41,396	22.00%	132,334	70.34%	14,415	7.66%
2020	42,501	20.62%	159,089	77.19%	4,521	2.19%
2024	40,758	20.76%	150,149	76.49%	5,397	2.75%

United States Senate election results for Boulder County, Colorado2
Year	Republican		Democratic		Third party(ies)	
Year	No.	%	No.	%	No.	%
2020	47,321	23.03%	154,552	75.20%	3,643	1.77%

United States Senate election results for Boulder County, Colorado3
Year	Republican		Democratic		Third party(ies)	
Year	No.	%	No.	%	No.	%
2022	33,858	20.47%	128,227	77.51%	3,343	2.02%

Colorado Gubernatorial election results for Boulder County
Year	Republican		Democratic		Third party(ies)	
Year	No.	%	No.	%	No.	%
2022	30,454	18.45%	132,173	80.07%	2,450	1.48%

Boulder County has also demonstrated its progressive leanings in referendums on social issues, such as in 2006, when nearly 2/3 of Boulder County voters voted to reject Amendment 43, a constitutional amendment defining marriage as between one man and one woman. Although the amendment passed statewide with 55% of the vote, only 33% of Boulder County supported it. In 2012, over 66% of Boulder County voted in favor of Amendment 64, legalizing marijuana in the state of Colorado.

== Local courts ==
The 20th Judicial District of Colorado, the state trial court of general jurisdiction, serves and is coextensive with Boulder County. As of 2009 the 20th Judicial Circuit has eight District Court judges. The Boulder County Court, the state trial court of limited jurisdiction, consists of five judges and six magistrates.

Boulder County has two combined courthouses:

- The Boulder County Justice Center is located in the City of Boulder and is headquarters to the 20th Judicial District of Colorado. The office of the district attorney is also here, as is the Juvenile Assessment Center, the county's combined assessment and detention facility.
- The Longmont Courthouse in the City of Longmont acts as an extension of the County Court and the District Attorney's Office.

== Communities ==
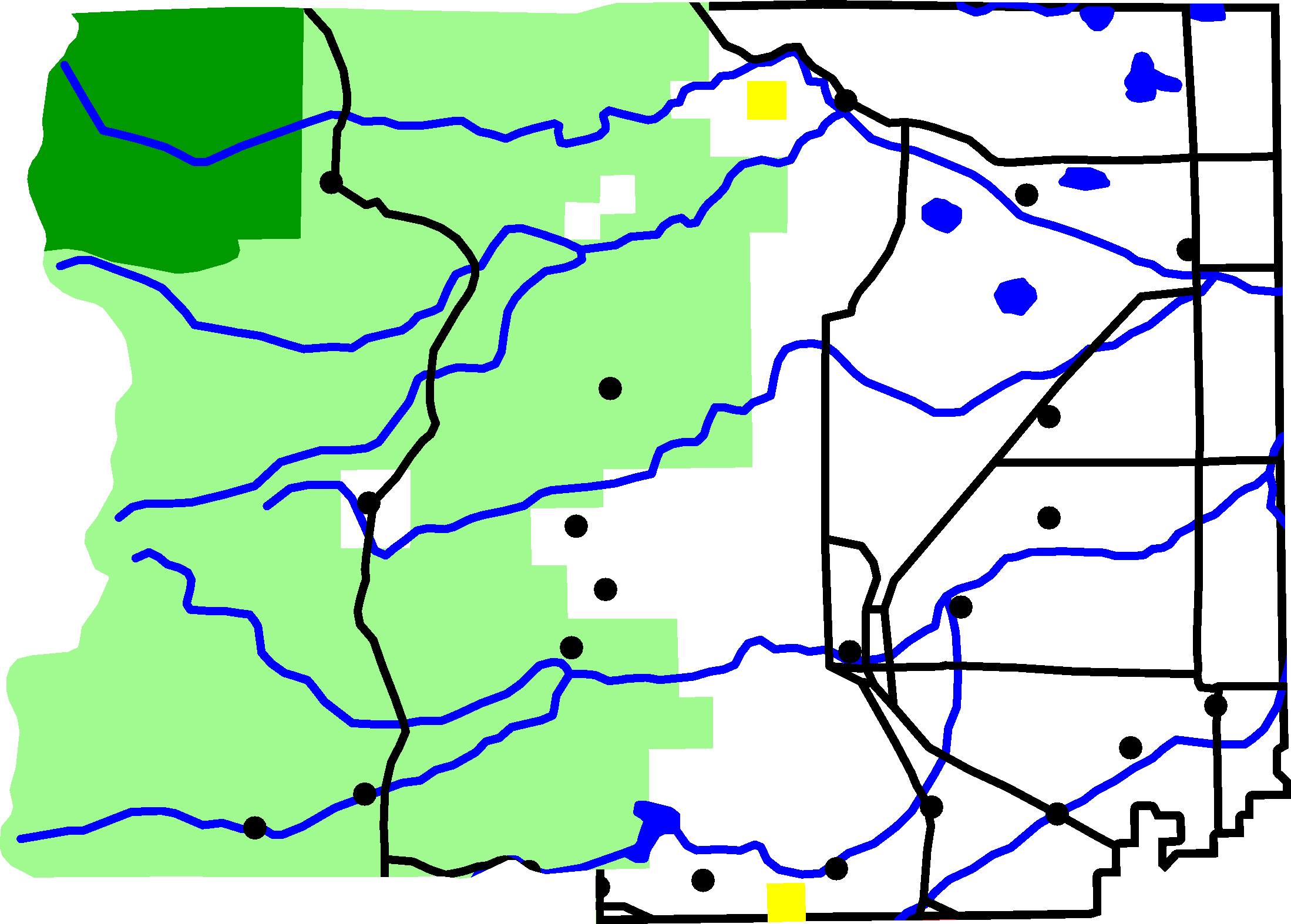
Boulder County, Colorado

=== Cities ===
- Boulder
- Lafayette
- Longmont (partly in Weld County)
- Louisville

=== Towns ===
- Erie (partly in Weld County)
- Jamestown
- Lyons
- Nederland
- Superior (partly in Jefferson County)
- Ward

=== Census-designated places ===
- Allenspark
- Altona
- Bark Ranch
- Bonanza Mountain Estates
- Coal Creek (partly in Gilpin County and Jefferson County)
- Crisman
- Eldora
- Eldorado Springs
- Glendale
- Gold Hill
- Gunbarrel
- Hidden Lake
- Lazy Acres
- Leyner
- Mountain Meadows
- Niwot
- Paragon Estates
- Pine Brook Hill
- Seven Hills
- St. Ann Highlands
- Sugarloaf
- Sunshine
- Tall Timber
- Valmont

=== Other unincorporated communities ===
- Caribou
- Canfield
- Gooding
- Hygiene
- Highland
- Liggett
- Morey
- Pinecliffe
- Pleasant View Ridge (partly in Weld County)
- Tabor

== Education ==
School districts serving Boulder County include:

- Boulder Valley School District RE-2
- Estes Park School District R-3
- St. Vrain Valley School District RE-1J
- Thompson School District R-2J

== See also ==
- Boulder, CO Metropolitan Statistical Area
- Denver-Aurora-Greeley, CO Combined Statistical Area
- Front Range Urban Corridor
- Bibliography of Colorado
- Geography of Colorado
  - Marfell Lakes
- History of Colorado
  - 2013 Colorado floods
  - Jackson County, Jefferson Territory
  - National Register of Historic Places listings in Boulder County, Colorado
- Index of Colorado-related articles
- List of Colorado-related lists
  - List of counties in Colorado
  - List of statistical areas in Colorado
- Outline of Colorado
