= Hidden Lake, Colorado =

Census-designated place in Boulder County, CO, USA

- Census-designated place
- Location of the Hidden Lake CDP in Boulder County, Colorado
- Coordinates: 40°06′20″N 105°28′40″W
- Country: United States
- State: Colorado
- County: Boulder County

Government
  - Type: unincorporated community

Area
  - Total: 0.625 sq mi (1.620 km^{2})
  - Land: 0.611 sq mi (1.583 km^{2})
  - Water: 0.014 sq mi (0.037 km^{2})
- Elevation: 8,960 ft (2,730 m)

Population (2020)
  - Total: 24
  - Density: 39/sq mi (15/km^{2})
- Time zone: UTC-7 (MST)
  - Summer (DST): UTC-6 (MDT)
- ZIP Code: Ward post office (Zip Code 80481
- Area codes: 303 & 720
- GNIS feature ID: 2583245

Hidden Lake is an unincorporated community and a census-designated place (CDP) located in and governed by Boulder County, Colorado, United States. The CDP is a part of the Boulder, CO Metropolitan Statistical Area. The population of the Hidden Lake CDP was 24 at the United States Census 2020. The Ward post office (Zip Code 80481) serves the area.

== Geography ==
Hidden Lake is located in western Boulder County in the Front Range of the Colorado Rocky Mountains. State Highway 72, the Peak to Peak Highway, forms the western edge of the community, leading south 4 miles (6 km) to Ward and 15 miles (24 km) to Nederland, and north 27 miles (43 km) to Estes Park.

The Hidden Lake CDP has an area of 400 acres (1.620 km^{2}), including 9.1 acres (0.037 km^{2}) of water.

== Demographics ==
The United States Census Bureau initially defined the Hidden Lake CDP for the United States Census 2010.

Hidden Lake CDP, Colorado
Year	Pop.	±%
2010	31	—
2020	24	−22.6%
Source: United States Census Bureau

== See also ==
- Boulder, CO Metropolitan Statistical Area
