= Jamestown, Colorado =

Town in Colorado, United States

Town of Jamestown, Colorado
- Statutory Town
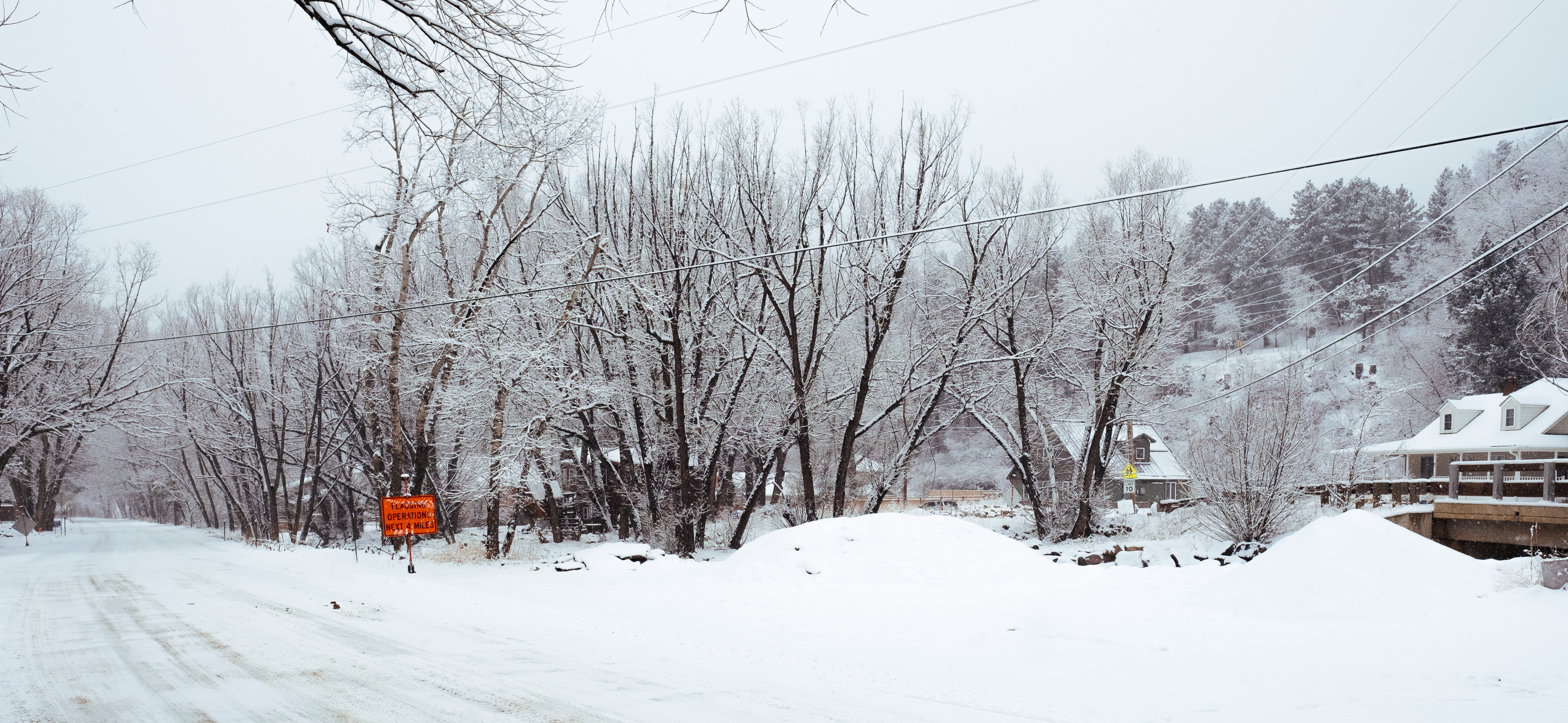
- A view from Mill street looking towards Main Street

- Location of Jamestown in Boulder County, Colorado.
- Coordinates: 40°07′21″N 105°23′39″W
- Country: United States
- State: Colorado
- County: Boulder
- Incorporated (town): June 22, 1883

Government
  - Type: Statutory Town

Area
  - Total: 0.63 sq mi (1.62 km^{2})
  - Land: 0.63 sq mi (1.62 km^{2})
  - Water: 0 sq mi (0.00 km^{2})
- Elevation: 7,208 ft (2,197 m)

Population (2020)
  - Total: 256
  - Density: 398.0/sq mi (153.66/km^{2})
- Time zone: UTC-7 (Mountain (MST))
  - Summer (DST): UTC-6 (MDT)
- ZIP code: 80455
- Area code: 303
- FIPS code: 08-39195
- GNIS feature ID: 2412800
- Website: www.jamestownco.org

The historic Town of Jamestown is a Statutory Town in Boulder County, Colorado, United States. The population was 256 at the 2020 United States census, down from 274 in 2010. It was named for James Smith, an early discoverer of gold. Jamestown was hit hard by the September 2013 Colorado floods when the town was isolated due to road damage from the rains and the flooding of James Creek. Under a mandatory evacuation order, most residents were airlifted to safety under the direction of the Colorado National Guard to nearby Boulder.

== Geography ==
Jamestown is in central Boulder County and lies along James Creek within the Front Range of the Colorado Rockies. Access is via James Canyon Drive, which leads east 8 miles (13 km) to U.S. Highway 36 in Altona and west 6.5 miles (10.5 km) to State Highway 72 (the Peak to Peak Highway) near Peaceful Valley.

According to the United States Census Bureau, the town has an area of 0.62 square miles (1.6 km^{2}), all of it land.

== Demographics ==
Historical population
Census	Pop.	Note	%±
1890	212		—
1900	164		−22.6%
1910	157		−4.3%
1920	150		−4.5%
1930	69		−54.0%
1940	190		175.4%
1950	118		−37.9%
1960	107		−9.3%
1970	185		72.9%
1980	223		20.5%
1990	251		12.6%
2000	205		−18.3%
2010	274		33.7%
2020	256		−6.6%
U.S. Decennial Census

As of the census of 2000, there were 205 people, 96 households, and 52 families residing in the town. The population density was 314.2 inhabitants per square mile (121.3/km^{2}). There were 102 housing units at an average density of 156.3 units per square mile (60.3 units/km^{2}). The racial makeup of the town was 97.56% White, 0.98% Asian, 0.49% Pacific Islander, and 0.98% from two or more races. Hispanic or Latino of any race were 0.49% of the population. There are now (2010) a couple of French people representing 0.98% of the people.

There were 96 households, out of which 26.0% had children under the age of 18 living with them, 47.9% were married couples living together, 3.1% had a female householder with no husband present, and 44.8% were non-families. 30.2% of all households were made up of individuals, and 5.2% had someone living alone who was 65 years of age or older. The average household size was 2.14 and the average family size was 2.74.

In the town, the population was spread out, with 19.0% under the age of 18, 2.0% from 18 to 24, 46.3% from 25 to 44, 26.8% from 45 to 64, and 5.9% who were 65 years of age or older. The median age was 39 years. For every 100 females, there were 101.0 males. For every 100 females age 18 and over, there were 100.0 males.

The median income for a household in the town was $67,500, and the median income for a family was $73,250. Males had a median income of $46,042 versus $31,875 for females. The per capita income for the town was $29,904. About 5.9% of families and 5.4% of the population were below the poverty line, including none of those under the age of eighteen and 46.7% of those 65 or over.

== See also ==
- North Central Colorado Urban Area
- Denver-Aurora-Boulder, CO Combined Statistical Area
- Roosevelt National Forest
