= Paragon Estates, Colorado =

Census-designated place in Boulder County, CO, USA

- Census-designated place
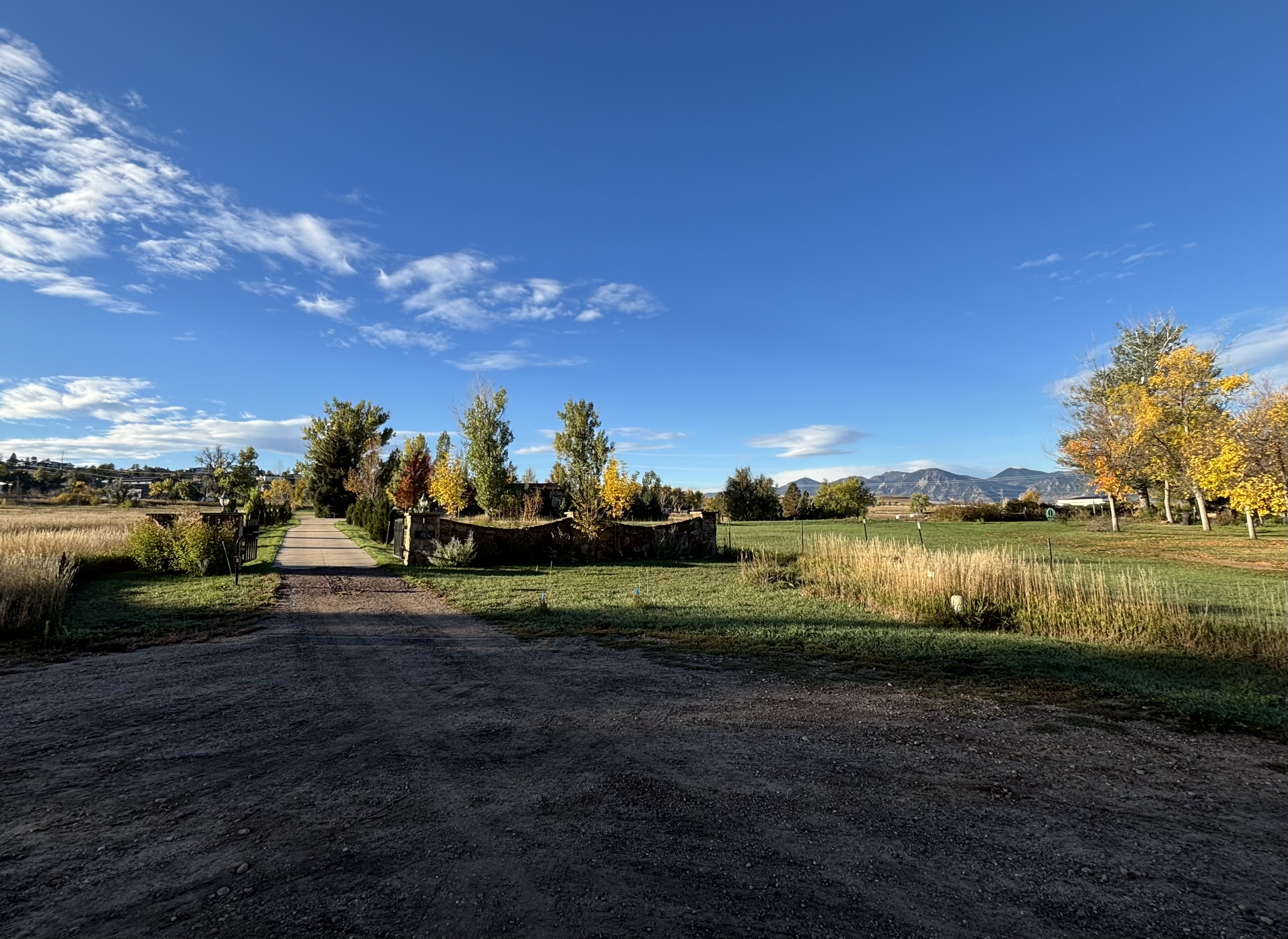
- Looking west along the paved path at Vaquero Drive in Paragon Estates, Boulder County, Colorado, with autumn trees and the Flatirons on the horizon.

- Location of the Paragon Estates CDP in Boulder County, Colorado
- Coordinates: 39°58′49″N 105°10′53″W
- Country: United States
- State: Colorado
- County: Boulder County

Government
  - Type: unincorporated community

Area
  - Total: 1.684 sq mi (4.361 km^{2})
  - Land: 1.676 sq mi (4.341 km^{2})
  - Water: 0.0077 sq mi (0.020 km^{2})
- Elevation: 5,440 ft (1,660 m)

Population (2020)
  - Total: 975
  - Density: 582/sq mi (225/km^{2})
- Time zone: UTC-7 (MST)
  - Summer (DST): UTC-6 (MDT)
- ZIP Code: Boulder 80303
- Area codes: 303 & 720
- GNIS feature ID: 2583275

Paragon Estates is an unincorporated community and a census-designated place (CDP) located in and governed by Boulder County, Colorado, United States. The CDP is a part of the Boulder, CO Metropolitan Statistical Area. The population of the Paragon Estates CDP was 975 at the United States Census 2020. Mailing addresses in the community are assigned the Zip Code 80303.

== Geography ==
Paragon Estates is located in southeastern Boulder County on the northwest edge of Louisville and 6 miles (10 km) southeast of Boulder. U.S. Highway 36, the Denver–Boulder Turnpike, forms the southwest edge of the CDP.

The Paragon Estates CDP has an area of 1,078 acres (4.361 km^{2}), including 4.9 acres (0.020 km^{2}) of water.

== Demographics ==
The United States Census Bureau initially defined the Paragon Estates CDP for the United States Census 2010.

Paragon Estates CDP, Colorado
| Year | Pop. | ±% |
|---|---|---|
| 2010 | 928 | — |
| 2020 | 975 | +5.1% |
Source: United States Census Bureau

== See also ==
- Boulder, CO Metropolitan Statistical Area
