= Pine Brook Hill, Colorado =

Census-designated place in Boulder County, CO, USA

- Census-designated place
- Location of the Pine Brook Hill CDP in Boulder County, Colorado
- Coordinates: 40°02′46″N 105°18′35″W
- Country: United States
- State: Colorado
- County: Boulder

Government
  - Type: Unincorporated community

Area
  - Total: 2.867 sq mi (7.426 km^{2})
  - Land: 2.860 sq mi (7.408 km^{2})
  - Water: 0.0069 sq mi (0.018 km^{2})
- Elevation: 6,539 ft (1,993 m)

Population (2020)
  - Total: 975
  - Density: 341/sq mi (132/km^{2})
- Time zone: UTC-7 (MST)
  - Summer (DST): UTC-6 (MDT)
- ZIP Code: Boulder 80304
- Area codes: 303 & 720
- GNIS feature ID: 2583281

Pine Brook Hill is an unincorporated community and a census-designated place (CDP) located in and governed by Boulder County, Colorado, United States. The CDP is a part of the Boulder, CO Metropolitan Statistical Area. The population of the Pine Brook Hill CDP was 975 at the United States Census 2020. The Boulder post office (Zip Code 80304) serves the area.

== Geography ==
Pine Brook Hill is located in central Boulder County on the northwest edge of the city of Boulder. It is located in the hills directly overlooking Boulder, with elevations ranging from 5,800 feet (1,800 m) at the eastern base of the hills to 6,953 feet (2,119 m) on a hilltop near the western edge of the CDP.

The Pine Brook Hill CDP has an area of 1,835 acres (7.426 km^{2}), including 4.4 acres (0.018 km^{2}) of water.

== Demographics ==
The United States Census Bureau initially defined the Pine Brook Hill CDP for the United States Census 2010.

Pine Brook Hill CDP, Colorado
Year	Pop.	±%
2010	983	—
2020	975	−0.8%
Source: United States Census Bureau

== See also ==
- Boulder, CO Metropolitan Statistical Area
