= Leyner, Colorado =

Census-designated place in Boulder County, CO, USA

- Census-designated place
- Location of the Leyner CDP in Boulder County, Colorado
- Coordinates: 40°03′04″N 105°06′27″W
- Country: United States
- State: Colorado
- County: Boulder County

Government
  - Type: unincorporated community

Area
  - Total: 0.236 sq mi (0.612 km^{2})
  - Land: 0.195 sq mi (0.506 km^{2})
  - Water: 0.041 sq mi (0.106 km^{2})
- Elevation: 5,033 ft (1,534 m)

Population (2020)
  - Total: 40
  - Density: 200/sq mi (79/km^{2})
- Time zone: UTC-7 (MST)
  - Summer (DST): UTC-6 (MDT)
- ZIP Code: Lafayette 80026
- Area codes: 303 & 720
- GNIS feature ID: 2583260

Leyner is an unincorporated community and a census-designated place (CDP) located in and governed by Boulder County, Colorado, United States. The CDP is a part of the Boulder, CO Metropolitan Statistical Area. The population of the Leyner CDP was 40 at the United States Census 2020. The Lafayette post office (Zip Code 80026) serves the area.

== Geography ==
Leyner is located in eastern Boulder County along the west side of U.S. Route 287, 4 miles (6 km) north of Lafayette. Boulder Creek forms the northern edge of the CDP.

The Leyner CDP has an area of 151 acres (0.612 km^{2}), including 26 acres (0.106 km^{2}) of water.

== History ==
A rail line was built through the Leyner area in the early 1870s by the Denver & Boulder Valley Railroad, connecting Boulder and Brighton. The D&BV was acquired by the Union Pacific Railroad in 1898. Leyner does not appear on topographic maps until 1951, and it was adjacent to a siding, indicating that it was probably a railway station at some point in history.

The rail line has been owned since 2009 by the Regional Transportation District.

== Demographics ==
The United States Census Bureau initially defined the Leyner, CDP for the United States Census 2010.

Leyner CDP, Colorado
Year	Pop.	±%
2010	29	—
2020	40	+37.9%
Source: United States Census Bureau

== See also ==
- Boulder, CO Metropolitan Statistical Area
