= Crisman, Colorado =

Unincorporated community in Colorado, US

- Census-designated place
- Location of the Crisman CDP in Boulder County, Colorado
- Coordinates: 40°02′25″N 105°22′16″W
- Country: United States
- State: Colorado
- County: Boulder
- Founded: 1874

Government
  - Type: Unincorporated community
  - Body: Boulder County

Area
  - Total: 1.457 sq mi (3.774 km^{2})
  - Land: 1.457 sq mi (3.774 km^{2})
  - Water: 0.00015 sq mi (0.0004 km^{2})
- Elevation: 6,592 ft (2,009 m)

Population (2020)
  - Total: 179
  - Density: 123/sq mi (47.4/km^{2})
- Time zone: UTC−07:00 (MST)
  - Summer (DST): UTC−06:00 (MDT)
- ZIP code: Boulder 80302
- Area codes: 303/720/983
- GNIS CDP ID: 2583229
- FIPS code: 08-18585

Crisman is an unincorporated community and a census-designated place (CDP) located in and governed by Boulder County, Colorado, United States. The CDP is a part of the Boulder, CO Metropolitan Statistical Area. The population of the Crisman CDP was 179 at the United States Census 2020. The Boulder post office (Zip Code 80302) serves the area.

== History ==
Crisman was founded in 1874 as a mining camp and named after the adjacent Crisman Mill, an ore-processing mill owned by prospector and early settler Obed Crisman. The Crisman, Colorado Territory, post office operated from July 20, 1876, until June 15, 1894, and then again from January 4, 1898, until May 31, 1918. The Boulder, Colorado, post office (ZIP code 80302) now serves the area. Crisman became a boomtown in 1881, when the Yellow Pine Mine produced a massive silver strike. Crisman became a stop on the Greeley, Salt Lake and Pacific Railway. The Panic of 1893 and the subsequent crash of the silver market severely damaged Crisman's economy, although the nearby mines remained open for the duration. In 1894, Boulder Creek flooded, and much of the town was destroyed, including a section of railroad track. The obliterated structures were never rebuilt, and Crisman was significantly reduced in size. In 1901, the Logan Mine, a large gold operation near Crisman, uncovered a second strike, which prevented the town from disappearing altogether. By 1918, Crisman had become increasingly depopulated, and the post office closed that year. In 1919, another catastrophic flood swept through Fourmile Canyon, again destroying a section of railroad track and leaving little left of Crisman. The town has since been reduced to a hamlet.

== Geography ==
Crisman is located in central Boulder County in the Front Range of the Colorado Rocky Mountains, in the valley of Fourmile Creek at an elevation of 6,578 feet (2,005 m). Four Mile Canyon Drive leads 7 miles (11 km) southeast to Boulder and 5 miles (8 km) northwest to Gold Hill.

The Crisman CDP has an area of 933 acres (3.774 km^{2}), including 0.099 acres (0.0004 km^{2}) of water.

== Demographics ==
The United States Census Bureau initially defined the Crisman CDP for the United States Census 2010.

Crisman CDP, Colorado
Year	Pop.	±%
2010	186	—
2020	179	−3.8%
Source: United States Census Bureau

== See also ==
- Front Range Urban Corridor
