= St. Anton Highlands, Colorado =

Census-designated place in Boulder County, CO, USA

- Census-designated place
- Location of the St. Anton Highlands CDP in the United States St. Anton Highlands (Colorado)
- Coordinates: 39°59′14″N 105°27′21″W
- Country: United States
- State: Colorado
- County: Boulder County

Government
  - Type: unincorporated community

Area
  - Total: 1.391 sq mi (3.602 km^{2})
  - Land: 1.391 sq mi (3.602 km^{2})
  - Water: 0 sq mi (0.000 km^{2})
- Elevation: 8,285 ft (2,525 m)

Population (2020)
  - Total: 325
  - Density: 234/sq mi (90.2/km^{2})
- Time zone: UTC-7 (MST)
  - Summer (DST): UTC-6 (MDT)
- ZIP Code: Nederland 80466
- Area codes: 303 & 720
- GNIS feature ID: 2583290

St. Anton Highlands or Saint Ann Highlands is an unincorporated community and a census-designated place (CDP) located in and governed by Boulder County, Colorado, United States. The CDP is a part of the Boulder, CO Metropolitan Statistical Area. The population of the St. Anton Highlands CDP was 325 at the United States Census 2020. The Nederland post office (Zip Code 80466) serves the area.

== Geography ==
St. Anton Highlands is located in southern Boulder County, 4 miles (6 km) northeast of the town of Nederland. It occupies a ridge between the valleys of North Boulder Creek and Middle Boulder Creek. State Highway 119 forms the southern edge of the CDP, connecting Nederland to the west with Boulder 12 miles (19 km) to the east.

== Geography ==
The St. Anton Highlands CDP has an area of 890 acres (3.602 km^{2}), all land.

== Demographics ==
The United States Census Bureau initially defined the St. Anton Highlands CDP for the United States Census 2010.

St. Anton Highlands CDP, Colorado
Year	Pop.	±%
2010	288	—
2020	325	+12.8%
Source: United States Census Bureau

== See also ==
- Boulder, CO Metropolitan Statistical Area
