= Lazy Acres, Colorado =

Census-designated place in Boulder County, CO, USA

- Census-designated place
- Location of the Lazy Acres CDP in Boulder County, Colorado
- Coordinates: 40°05′01″N 105°19′53″W
- Country: United States
- State: Colorado
- County: Boulder County

Government
  - Type: unincorporated community

Area
  - Total: 5.291 sq mi (13.704 km^{2})
  - Land: 5.290 sq mi (13.700 km^{2})
  - Water: 0.0015 sq mi (0.004 km^{2})
- Elevation: 5,033 ft (1,534 m)

Population (2020)
  - Total: 957
  - Density: 181/sq mi (69.9/km^{2})
- Time zone: UTC-7 (MST)
  - Summer (DST): UTC-6 (MDT)
- ZIP Code: Boulder 80302
- Area codes: 303 & 720
- GNIS feature ID: 2583258

Lazy Acres is an unincorporated community and a census-designated place (CDP) located in and governed by Boulder County, Colorado, United States. The CDP is a part of the Boulder, CO Metropolitan Statistical Area. The population of the Lazy Acres CDP was 957 at the United States Census 2020. The Boulder post office (Zip Code 80302) serves the area.

== Geography ==
Lazy Acres is located in central Boulder County in the Front Range of the Southern Rocky Mountains. It is situated on a ridge northwest of the city of Boulder.

The Lazy Acres CDP has an area of 3,386 acres (13.704 km^{2}), including 1.0 acre (0.004 km^{2}) of water.

== Demographics ==
The United States Census Bureau initially defined the Lazy Acres CDP for the United States Census 2010.

Lazy Acres CDP, Colorado
Year	Pop.	±%
2010	920	—
2020	957	+4.0%
Source: United States Census Bureau

== See also ==
- Boulder, CO Metropolitan Statistical Area
