= Area codes 303, 720, and 983 =

Colorado telephone area codes

Coordinates: 40°N 105°W

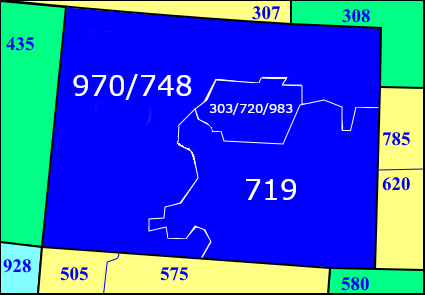
Numbering plan areas of Colorado (blue) and area codes.

Area codes 303, 720, and 983 are telephone area codes in the North American Numbering Plan (NANP) for the north-central portion of the U.S. state of Colorado. The numbering plan area (NPA) comprises Denver and Boulder, as well as their surrounding suburbs, including Lakewood, Littleton, Longmont, Broomfield, Aurora, and Castle Rock. Area code 303 is the original area code of the NPA, as well as for the entire state, reduced in geographic extent over time. Area codes 720 and 983 were added in 1998 and 2022, respectively, to form an overlay complex for the area, meaning that the same geographic service area is served by all area codes and that ten-digit dialing is required for all calls made within the service area.

== History ==
Area code 303 was one of the original North American area codes of 1947, and originally served the entire state of Colorado. It remained the state's sole area code for 40 years.

Colorado's growth in the second half of the 20th century, particularly in the Denver/Boulder area, made it a certainty that Colorado would need another area code. An impending number shortage in the late 1980s meant this split could no longer be staved off. On March 5, 1988, southeastern Colorado, including Colorado Springs and Pueblo, was split off as area code 719.

This was intended as a long-term solution, but within five years further demand for numbers and the proliferation of cell phones and pagers (especially in and around Denver) forced another split. The northeastern and western portions of area code 303, including Fort Collins, Grand Junction, Vail and Aspen, were separated on April 2, 1995, and became area code 970. This split reduced 303 to the Denver-Boulder area. With the 1995 split, 303 was the only Colorado area code that did not border another state.

Within two years, continued sharp growth in the Front Range made further relief necessary. The Front Range is home not only to most of Colorado's landlines, but also most of the state's cell phones, fax machines, and pagers. On September 1, 1998, area code 720 was instituted in the 303 service area to create an overlay.

In 2020, the North American Numbering Plan Administrator estimated that the Denver metropolitan area would reach numbering exhaustion by 2023. On May 21, 2021, the Colorado Public Utilities Commission approved an additional area code, 983, for the 303/720 overlay complex. Area code 983 was activated on June 17, 2022. This addition resulted in 23.8 million numbers being assigned to an area of about 3.5 million people.

== Local calling ==
The numbering plan area is one of the largest toll-free calling zones in the western United States. With the exception of Roggen, Brighton, and Wiggins, no long-distance charges are levied for any calls made from one telephone to another in the area.

== Unofficial holiday ==
303 Day, named for the area code, is an unofficial holiday on which Colorado businesses celebrate their state by offering discounts on March 3. The observance was created in 2009 by Jeb Freedman, a KTCL radio personality, and members of the band 3OH!3.

== See also ==
- Geography of Colorado
- List of North American Numbering Plan area codes
- List of populated places in Colorado

Colorado area codes: 303/720/983, 719, 748/970
	North: 970	
West: 970	303/720/983	East: 719
	South: 719	
