= Mount Blue Sky =

Mountain in Colorado, United States

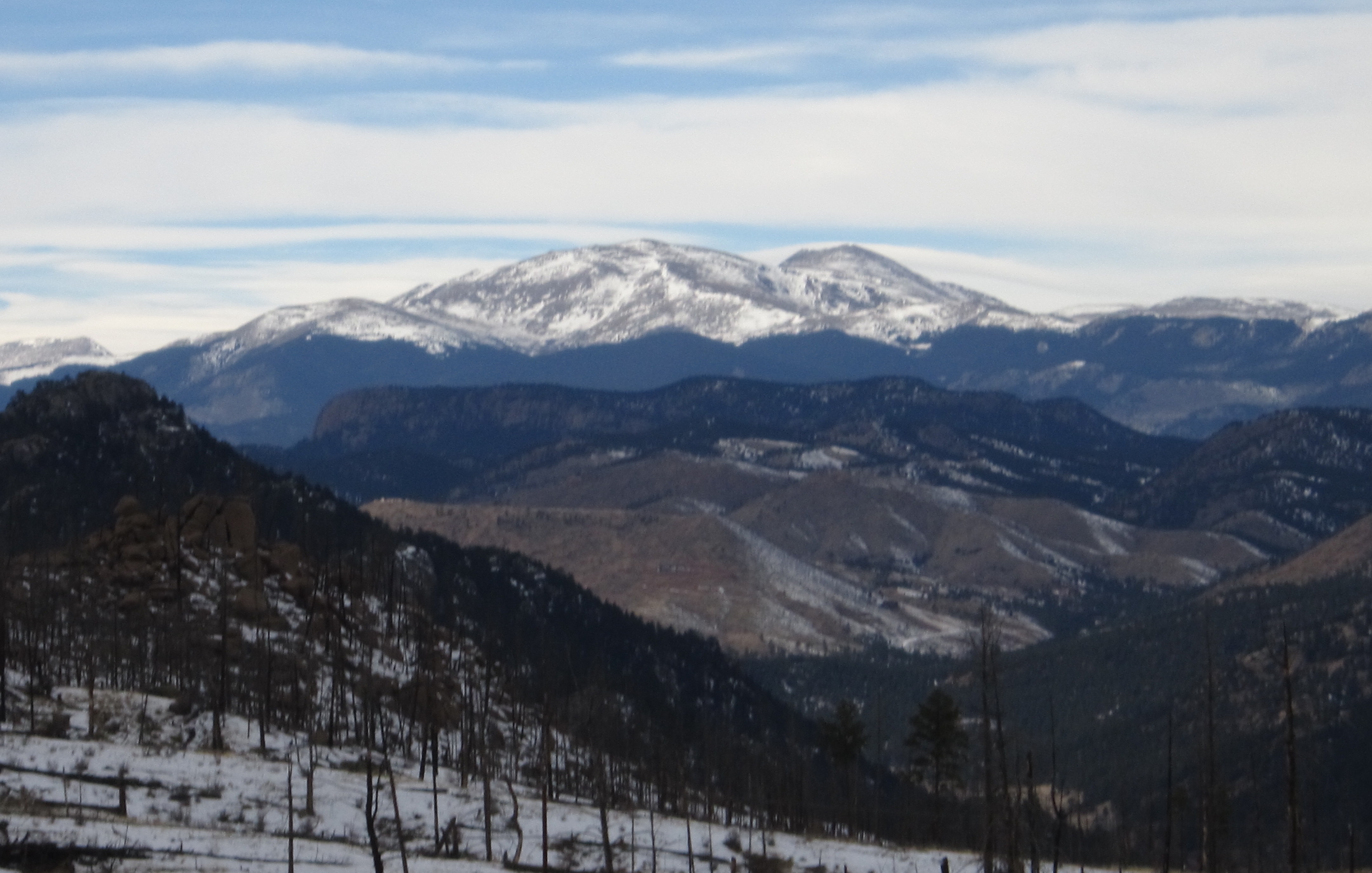
- Mount Blue Sky seen from the south

Highest point
- Elevation: 14,266.1 feet (4,348 m); NAPGD2022
- Prominence: 2,770 feet (844 m)
- Isolation: 9.79 miles (15.76 km)
- Listing: North America highest peaks 41st; US highest major peaks 27th; Colorado highest major peaks 12th; Colorado fourteeners 14th
- Coordinates: 39.5883°N 105.6438°W

Geography
- Location within Colorado
- Location: Clear Creek County, Colorado, U.S.
- Parent range: Front Range
- Topo map(s): USGS 7.5' topographic map Mount Blue Sky, Colorado

Climbing
- First ascent: disputed: 1863 by Albert Bierstadt; 1872 by Judge Lunt
- Easiest route: West Ridge from Summit Lake: Hike, class 2

Mount Blue Sky (previously Mount Evans) is the highest peak in the Mount Evans Wilderness in the Front Range of the Rocky Mountains of North America. The prominent 14,266.1-foot (4,348 m) fourteener is located 13.4 miles (21.6 km) southwest by south (bearing 214°) of Idaho Springs in Clear Creek County, Colorado, United States, on the drainage divide between Clear Creek in Arapaho National Forest and the North Fork South Platte River in Pike National Forest.

The peak is one of the characteristic Front Range peaks, dominating the western skyline of the Great Plains along with Pikes Peak, Longs Peak, and nearby Mount Bierstadt. Mount Blue Sky can be seen from over 100 miles (160 km) to the east, and many miles in other directions. Mount Blue Sky dominates the Denver metropolitan area skyline, rising over 9,000 feet (2,700 m) above the area. Mount Blue Sky can be seen from points south of Castle Rock (65 miles or 105 km south), as far north as Fort Collins (95 miles or 153 km north), and from areas near Limon (105 miles or 169 km east).

The mountain was previously named for the second governor of the Territory of Colorado, John Evans. However, due to Evans's involvement in the 1864 Sand Creek Massacre, there were years of discussion over renaming Mount Evans. On September 15, 2023, the United States Board on Geographic Names officially changed the mountain's name to Mount Blue Sky.

== Geography ==
Mount Blue Sky is the highest peak in a massif. The peak is 35 miles (56 km) west of Denver as the crow flies and approximately 51 miles (82 km) by road via Idaho Springs. Other peaks in the massif are:

- Mount Spalding (13,842 ft or 4,219 m), 1.1 mi (1.8 km) northwest
- Gray Wolf Mountain (13,602 ft or 4,146 m), 2.2 mi (3.5 km) north-northwest
- The Sawtooth (13,780 ft or 4,200 m), 1.2 mi (1.9 km) west
- Mount Bierstadt (14,060 ft or 4,290 m), 1.5 mi (2.4 km) west-southwest
- Mount Warren (13,307 ft or 4,056 m), 1.2 mi (1.9 km) north-northeast
- Rogers Peak (13,391 ft or 4,082 m), 2.33 mi (3.75 km) northeast.
- Mount Goliath (12,216 ft or 3,723 m), 4.7 mi (7.6 km) northeast,
- Epaulet Mountain (13,523 ft or 4,122 m), 1.4 mi (2.3 km) southeast,
- Rosalie Peak (13,579 ft or 4,139 m), 3.0 mi (4.8 km) southeast,

At least 7 deep glacial cirques cut into the massif. The cirques around Mount Blue Sky are the deepest cirques in the Colorado Rockies. The bottoms of many of these contain tarns, the most notable being:

- Summit Lake at the head of Bear Creek, 0.5 miles (0.80 km; 800 m) north
- the Chicago Lakes at the head of Chicago Creek, 2 miles (3.2 km; 3,200 m) north
- Abyss Lake at the head of Lake Fork, 1 mile (1.6 km; 1,600 m) west-southwest

The Mount Blue Sky Scenic Byway consists of State Highway 103 from Idaho Springs, Colorado on I-70 about 13 miles (21 km) to Echo Lake, and Colorado 5 from Echo Lake 15 miles (24 km), ending at a parking area and turnaround just below the summit. The latter has long been the highest paved road in North America (5th highest in the world) and is only open in the summer. Colorado 103 continues east from Echo Lake to Mestaa'ėhehe Pass, from which it connects, via Clear Creek County Road 103 and Jefferson County Road 66, to Bergen Park from which Colorado 74 leads to Evergreen.

The Guanella Pass Scenic Byway passes within 4 miles (6.4 km) west of Mount Blue Sky, linking Georgetown and I-70 with Grant and US 285, 22 miles (35 km) to the south.

A marked hiking trail roughly parallels the highway from Echo Lake to the summit and is rated class 2. A class 3 side route of Mount Bierstadt climbs to the northeastern peak of The Sawtooth, from which an easier ridge leads to the summit of Mount Blue Sky.

Most of the Evans massif is now part of the Mount Evans Wilderness area in Arapaho National Forest and Pike National Forest. The exception is a narrow corridor along the highway from Echo Lake that is excluded from the wilderness. Summit Lake Park and Echo Lake Park are part of the historic Denver Mountain Parks system.

== History ==
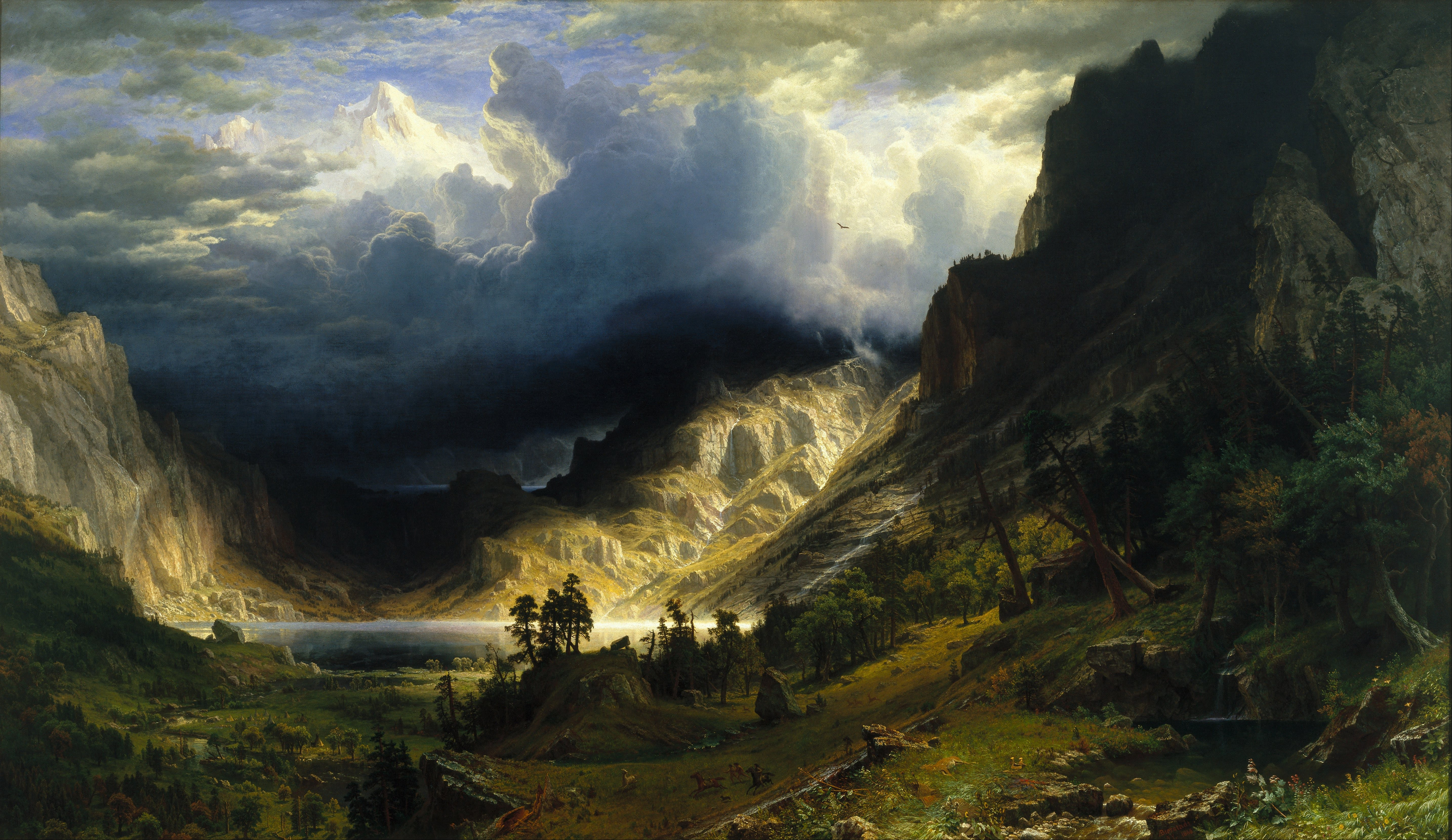
A Storm in the Rocky Mountains, Mt. Rosalie, a landscape oil painting by German-American painter Albert Bierstadt (1866)

At least 48 different tribes have ancestral ties to the area around the mountain.

Albert Bierstadt and his guide, William Newton Byers, approached the mountain along Chicago Creek from Idaho Springs in 1863. Bierstadt called it Mount Rosalie, initially naming the mountain after his wife-to-be Rosalie Osborne, spending several days painting sketches of the mountain from the Chicago Lakes before climbing to Summit Lake and onward to the summit. Bierstadt's sketch, Mountain Lake, accurately portrays the view of Mount Spalding over the Chicago Lakes. His painting A Storm in the Rocky Mountains, Mt. Rosalie, is based on that and other sketches.

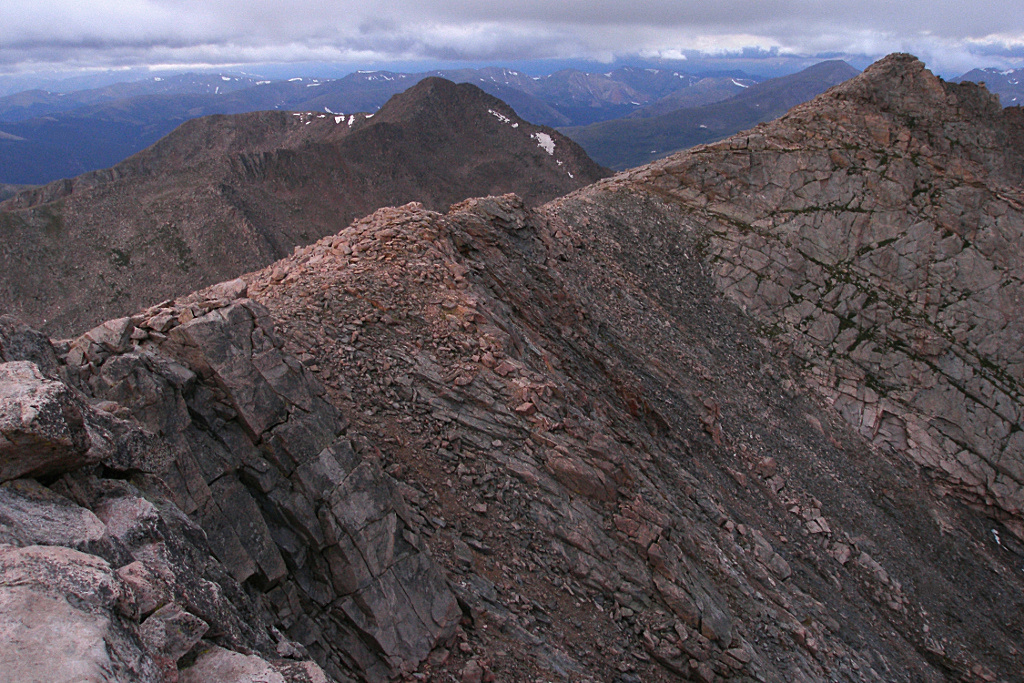
Looking west along ridge from summit

William Henry Jackson, attached to the Hayden Survey, visited the Chicago Lakes in 1873, where he took numerous photographs; the summit of the mountain is barely visible in several of these, peeking over the col between upper Chicago Lake and Summit Lake. The Hayden survey reported that Mount Rosalie was 14,330 feet (4,370 m) above sea level, measured by triangulation.

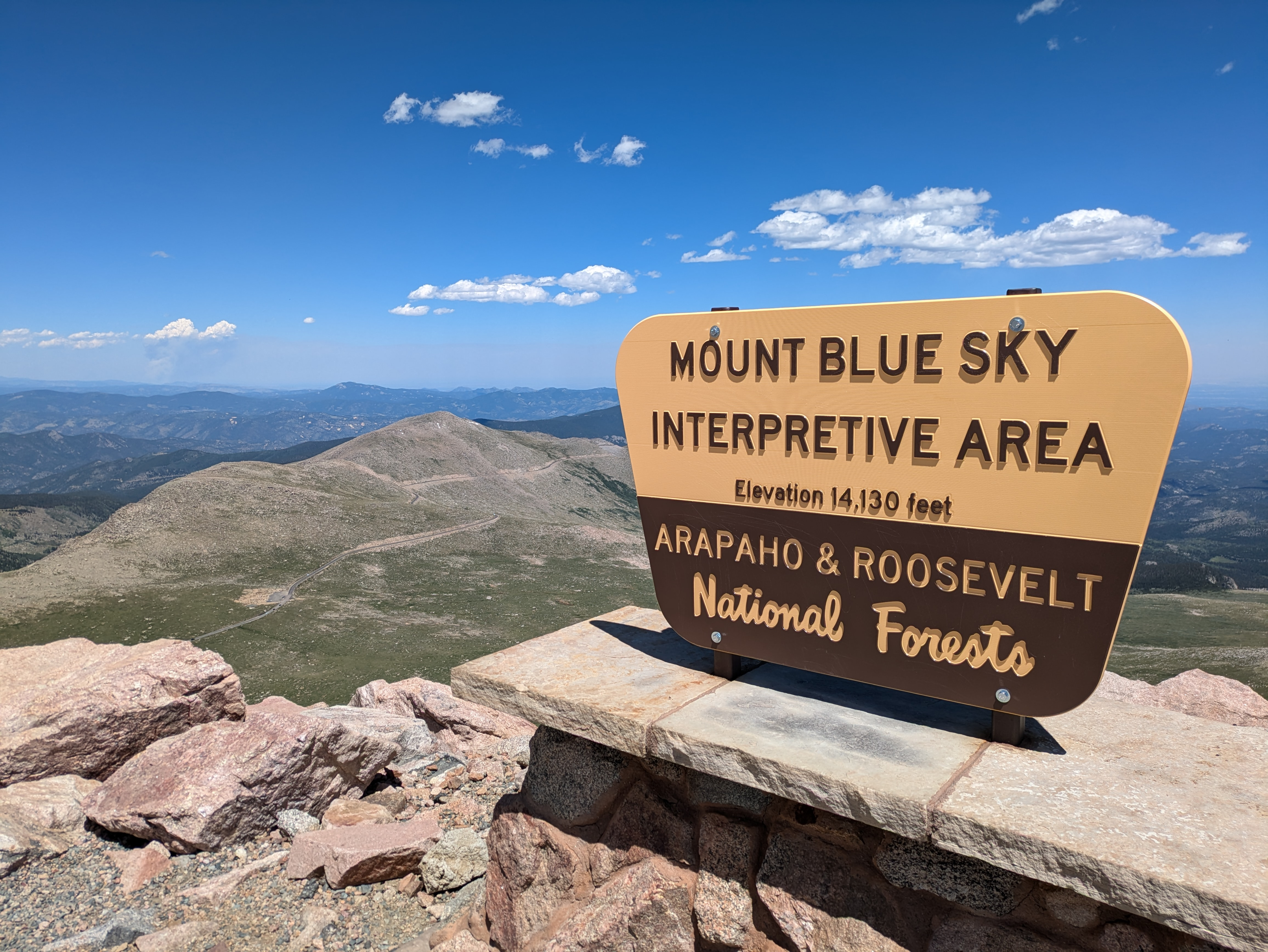
The United States Forest Service sign at the summit of Mount Blue Sky with Scenic Byway in background.

The history of the Mount Blue Sky Scenic Byway is part of a larger story of the Denver Mountain Parks system. The City and County of Denver initiated the construction of a series of automobile "scenic loops" to allow Denverites to explore the mountains. One road circuit, Circle G, was to traverse the ridge to Mestaa'ėhehe Pass on to Echo Lake, culminate in a climb up Mount Blue Sky, and loop down to Idaho Springs. In order to achieve this goal, Denver Mountain Parks acquired a series of land parcels, including the acquisition of Bergen Park in 1915. The Bear Creek segment from the Genesee saddle to Bergen Park was finished in 1915, while the Denver Mountain Parks committee worked to make Mount Evans a National Park, going as far as getting support in Congress for the construction of a "cement road" to the mountain. The first mile was paid for by Denver with the understanding that the State Highway Commission would do the rest. The Denver Mountain Parks committee was not without disagreement and setbacks, however. $30,000 was acquired early in 1916 to construct the Bergen Park to Mestaa'ėhehe Pass segment and all seemed to be flowing towards the goal of Mount Evans when the mayor of Denver, Robert W. Speer, appointed W.F.R. Mills as the Commissioner of Improvements, who summarily stopped the construction of the road, stating that "It is a road that starts nowhere, ends nowhere, and never gets there". After studying the issue, Mills later recanted and became a supporter of the park system, and the segment between Bergen Park and Mestaa'ėhehe Pass was constructed beginning in the spring of 1918. The next act was to get Mount Evans classified as a National Park, but 1916 was a tumultuous time between the National Park system and the U.S. Forest Service, who currently held claim to the mountain. Already in bitter struggle to prevent the formation of a National Park Service, Chief Forester Graves adamantly blocked the relinquishment of this area of National Forest, in exchange for Forest Service development of the area including the immediate construction of a road between Mestaa'ėhehe Pass and Echo Lake (Colorado). This joint exercise between the City and County of Denver, the U.S. Congress, the State Highway System, and now the Forest Service would be completed with help of a newly formed Federal Agency, the Bureau of Public Roads. In 1918, the Bureau of Public Roads provided the plan to construct 9.41 miles (15.14 km) of road from Soda Pass (later called Squaw Pass and now called Mestaa'ėhehe Pass) to Echo Lake beginning in 1919. By 1920, the road only went as far as Chief Mountain. By October 1, 1921, the Bureau of Public Roads had completed construction to Echo Lake. The first survey for the road from Echo Lake to the peak of Mount Blue Sky was made in 1923, finishing the layout by January 1924 despite a flu outbreak in the camp, damaging windstorms, and nearly insurmountable environmental hardships. Battling the unusual problems that come with high-altitude construction (steam shovels performing only half as effectively at high altitude, difficulty of hauling coal and water, horse suicide, etc.) the last 600 feet (180 m) were finally built by hand, being completed in 1930.

The ruins of the Crest House (1941–1942) sit nearby. Once containing both a restaurant and a gift shop, it burned down on September 1, 1979, and was not rebuilt, remaining as a place of contemplation today. The rock foundation and walls remain as a windbreak for mountain travelers, and the viewing platform is one of Colorado's premier scenic overlooks.

The mountain, along with Echo Lake, was designated as a historic site by the American Physical Society in 2017, commemorating the many cosmic-ray physics experiments conducted on the mountain between 1935 and 1960.

Mount Blue Sky also hosts the annual Mt. Evans Hill Climb, a 27.4 miles (44.1 km) bicycle race with a total of 6,915 feet (2,108 m) of climbing.

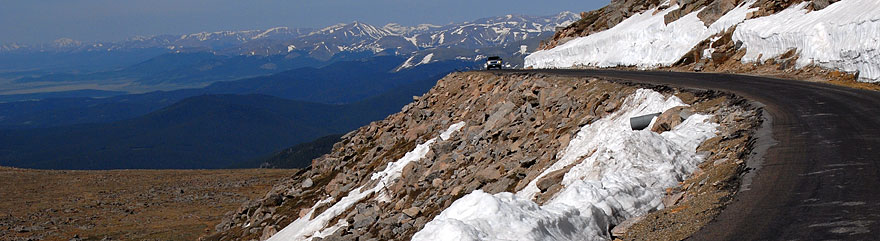
Mount Blue Sky Scenic Byway above Summit Lake, highest paved road in North America

== Environment ==
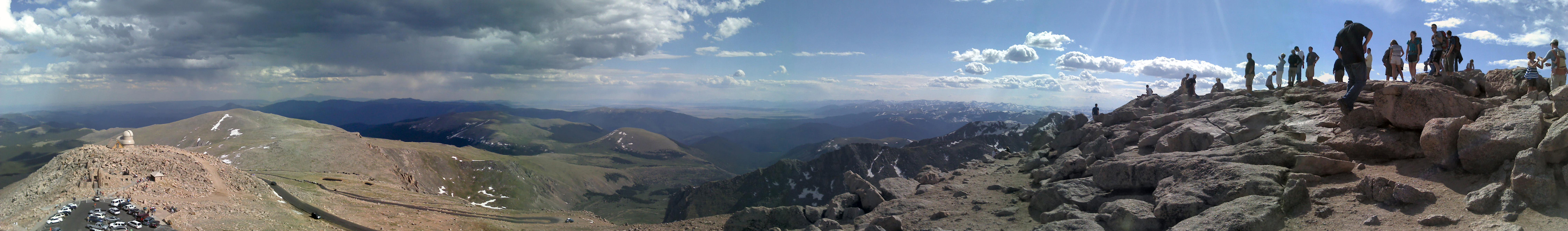
Summer crowds on Mount Blue Sky summit, July 3, 2011.

=== Climate ===
The atmospheric pressure on the summit is around 460 Torr (610 mbar), while a standard atmosphere (sea level) is 760 Torr (1013 mbar). At this pressure, many people suffer from altitude sickness.

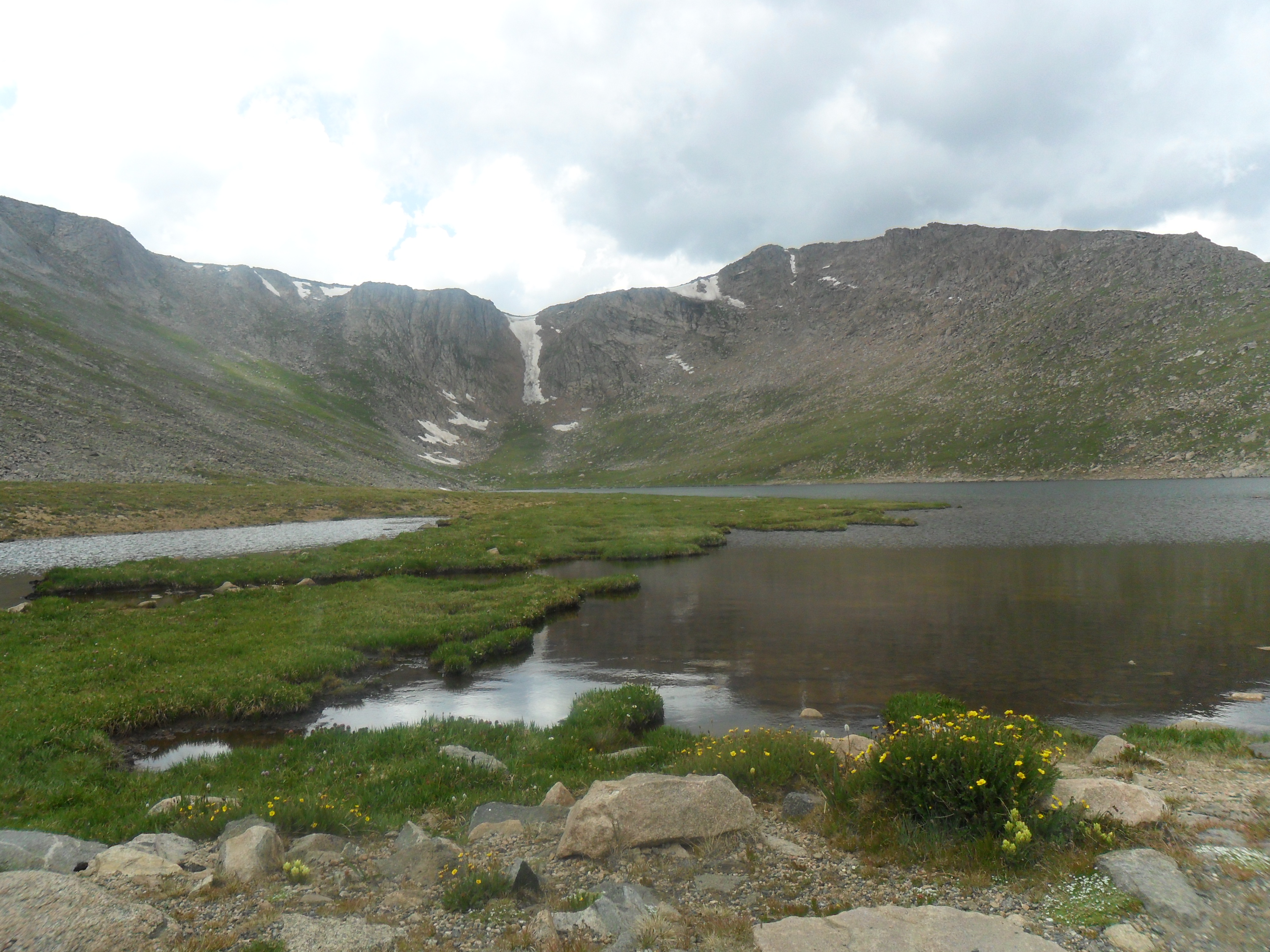
Summit Lake Park on Mount Blue Sky

The climate on the summit of Mount Blue Sky can be extreme. The mean annual temperature on the summit is 18 °F (−8 °C). Temperatures often fall below 0 °F (−18 °C), and occasionally fall as low as −40 °F (−40 °C). The highest temperature recorded on the summit was 65 °F (18 °C), and below freezing temperatures may occur at any time of year. The maximum wind speed measured was 107 knots (123 mph; 198 km/h), the average is from 25 to 30 knots (29 to 35 mph; 46 to 56 km/h). When the wind speed is over 15 knots (17 mph; 28 km/h), the wind is almost always from the west-southwest.

Climate data for Mount Blue Sky 39.5835 N, 105.6454 W, Elevation: 13,665 ft (4,165 m) (1991–2020 normals)
Month	Jan	Feb	Mar	Apr	May	Jun	Jul	Aug	Sep	Oct	Nov	Dec	Year
Mean daily maximum °F (°C)	19.9 (−6.7)	19.1 (−7.2)	24.9 (−3.9)	31.3 (−0.4)	39.7 (4.3)	50.4 (10.2)	56.1 (13.4)	53.4 (11.9)	47.5 (8.6)	36.9 (2.7)	26.6 (−3.0)	20.2 (−6.6)	35.5 (1.9)
Daily mean °F (°C)	8.9 (−12.8)	7.9 (−13.4)	13.1 (−10.5)	18.6 (−7.4)	27.3 (−2.6)	37.4 (3.0)	43.4 (6.3)	41.5 (5.3)	35.4 (1.9)	25.3 (−3.7)	16.1 (−8.8)	9.5 (−12.5)	23.7 (−4.6)
Mean daily minimum °F (°C)	−2.0 (−18.9)	−3.2 (−19.6)	1.2 (−17.1)	5.9 (−14.5)	14.9 (−9.5)	24.4 (−4.2)	30.7 (−0.7)	29.5 (−1.4)	23.2 (−4.9)	13.7 (−10.2)	5.5 (−14.7)	−1.2 (−18.4)	11.9 (−11.2)
Average precipitation inches (mm)	3.58 (91)	3.22 (82)	3.43 (87)	4.69 (119)	3.31 (84)	2.15 (55)	3.55 (90)	3.08 (78)	2.11 (54)	2.15 (55)	2.80 (71)	2.93 (74)	37 (940)
Source: PRISM Climate Group

=== 2012 tornado ===
At 2:51 pm on July 28, 2012, a weak, short-lived tornado touched down northeast of Mount Blue Sky's summit at an elevation estimated by the National Weather Service of 11,900 feet (3,600 m) above sea level. The tornado was the second highest recorded in the United States but did not cause any damage because it was above tree line.

=== Flora ===
The slopes of Mount Blue Sky include several distinct environments. Below Echo Lake, the montane forest is dominated by lodgepole pine (Pinus contorta) and in some areas, blue spruce (Picea pungens), with patches of quaking aspen. Echo Lake is high enough to be in the subalpine forest, where Engelmann spruce (Picea engelmannii), subalpine fir (Abies lasiocarpa) and bristlecone pine (Pinus aristata) dominate.

At tree line, the trees are reduced to krummholz, battered and twisted by wind and frost. The bristlecone pine grove on the east slope of Mount Goliath (39°38′24.95″N 105°35′56.24″W) contains at least one tree that sprouted in the year 403 AD. For many years, these were the oldest known trees in Colorado, but in 1992, trees dating to 442 BC were found in the southern Front Range and South Park. The Mount Goliath Natural Area, jointly managed by the United States Forest Service and the Denver Botanic Gardens protects this grove of old trees.

Above tree line, the landscape is mostly alpine tundra. In the lower tundra, dwarf willow (Salix herbacea) is common, along with a wide variety of flowering plants such as Rocky Mountain Columbine (Aquilegia saximontana) and various species of dwarf alpine sunflowers. Toward the summit, the vegetation shrinks until the largest plants are little more than compact green cushions in the cracks between the rocks. Here, Alpine Forget-me-not (Myosotis alpestris) plants with hundreds of blossoms occupy areas of only a few square centimeters and rise only centimeters above the soil surface.

The tundra around Summit Lake, particularly in Summit Lake Flats, the gently sloping area east of the lake, is frequently described as the southernmost area of arctic tundra in the world because it is water saturated and underlain by an extensive area of permafrost.

=== Fauna ===
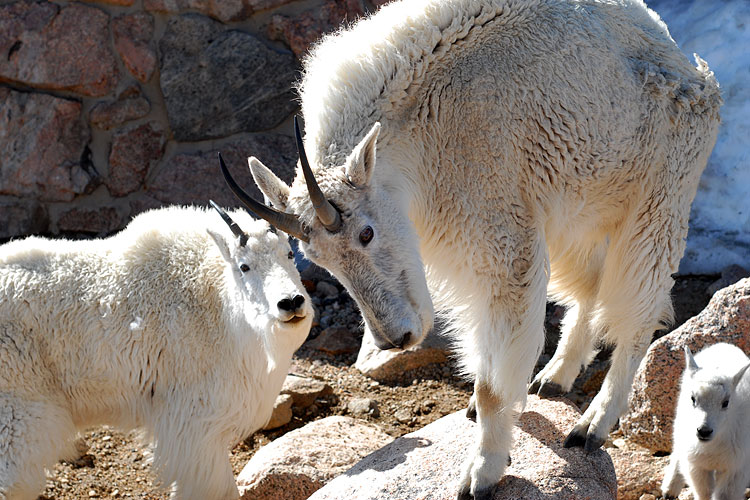
Mountain goats on Mt Blue Sky

The top predators found in the area are mountain lions (Puma concolor), anywhere on the mountain, and black bears (Ursus americanus), generally below tree line. These prey on bighorn sheep (Ovis canadensis) and mountain goats (Oreamnos americanus), as well as one of the highest densities of yellow-bellied marmot (Marmota flaviventris) in the region. Above tree-line, pikas (Ochotona princeps) are common. Below tree line, elk (Cervus canadensis) and mule deer (Odocoileus hemionus) are common.

Among birds, the white-tailed ptarmigan (Lagopus leucurus) are present on the mountain, but so well camouflaged that they are difficult to see even when almost underfoot. Brown-capped rosy finches (Leucosticte australis), pipits and rock wrens (Salpinctes obsoletus) are also seen near the summit.

== Geology ==
Mount Blue Sky was carved from the rock of the Mount Evans Batholith, formed by an intrusion of magma into the Earth's crust about 1.4 billion years ago (in the Mesoproterozoic Era of the Precambrian Eon). Much of the rock is granodiorite, a close relative of granite, modified by later intrusions of quartz and pegmatite.

The body of this batholith has been deeply cut by glacial cirques and canyons. Each of the nearby lakes, Summit Lake, the Chicago Lakes, Lincoln Lake and Abyss Lake are tarns located in cirques or glacial canyons surrounding Mount Blue Sky. Echo Lake was dammed by a lateral moraine of the glacier that formed Chicago Canyon. Prior to glaciation, Mount Blue Sky, Long's Peak and several other summits were monadnocks in an upland Peneplain. Glaciation has not entirely destroyed the ancient Flattop Peneplain, named for Flattop Mountain in Grand County. The peaks of these mountains are all remnant features of this peneplain.

== Scientific research ==
View from the summit of Mount Blue Sky of the end of the Mount Blue Sky Scenic Byway, Crest House and the Meyer–Womble Observatory, 2010.

The easy access to the summit provided by the Mount Blue Sky Highway has made it a popular location for scientific research. Arthur H. Compton conducted pioneering research on cosmic rays on the mountain in 1931, shortly after the road to the summit was completed. The University of Denver built a pair of A-frame buildings on the summit to house cosmic-ray researchers. By the 1950s, Mount Blue Sky, the Aiguille du Midi, the Pic du Midi and the Jungfrau were considered the premier locations for high-altitude physics experiments.

The first accurate measurement of the lifetime of the muon (originally called the mesotron) by Bruno Rossi in 1939, used sites at Mount Blue Sky, Echo Lake, Denver and Chicago. This experiment verified the reality of time dilation, one of the key predictions of Einstein's theory of relativity.

In the summer of 1948, MIT, Cornell, Princeton, NYU, Michigan, Chicago, Denver conducted an intensive experimental program on the mountain and at Echo Lake. Bruno Rossi and Giuseppe Cocconi were among those involved.

In 1965, the Midwestern Universities Research Association began doing high-energy physics experiments on the summit using cosmic rays to explore energies above those accessible with the most powerful particle accelerators of the day. The first experiments were conducted in a semi-trailer, and then in 1966, a temporary laboratory building was erected near the summit. This building was moved to Echo Lake that fall, where research continued until 1972.

The University of Denver erected the 0.6 m (24 in) Ritchey–Chrétien telescope in its summit laboratory in 1972. This was used to observe comets Kohoutek and Halley in 1972 and 1986. In 1996, the university finished construction on the Meyer–Womble Observatory, near the site of the A-frame laboratory buildings. At 14,148 feet (4,312 m) this was, from 1972 to 1999, the world's highest optical observatory. It is now the third-highest.

Mount Blue Sky has also been the site of significant research in the life sciences. In 1940, for example, it was the site of a significant study of high-altitude physiology. Pioneering studies on the effects of altitude training on track athletes were conducted on Mount Blue Sky in 1966.

Mount Evans Road is also noteworthy as a high-altitude vehicle testing venue for auto manufacturers. With full visibility on a public road, most manufacturers' road test teams tend to conceal their designs with various creative styles of camouflage, e.g. wild zebra paint motif, possibly paired with other temporary body coverings.

== Name ==
Mount Evans was named after the second territorial Governor of Colorado, John Evans. Commissions at Northwestern University and the University of Denver – both universities that were established by Evans himself – determined that Evans was among those responsible for the 1864 Sand Creek Massacre, which resulted in the death of between 150 and 500 Cheyenne and Arapaho people, most of whom were elderly, women, and children. Attempts were made to change the name of the mountain due to the history and actions of Governor Evans. In 2020, 43rd Colorado Governor Jared Polis established The Colorado Geographic Naming Advisory Board, which included Mount Evans for a possible renaming. The new name was proposed by the Southern Cheyenne and Arapaho Tribes. According to the proposal, the name "signifies the Arapaho as they were known as the Blue Sky People and the Cheyenne who have an annual ceremony of renewal of life called Blue Sky". In March 2022, Clear Creek County approved a proposal to rename the peak to Mount Blue Sky, pending state and federal review. Five other names were also submitted: Mount Rosalie, Mount Soule (after Silas Soule), Mount Sisty, Mount Evans (after Anne Evans), and Mount Cheyenne Arapaho. On November 17, 2022, the Colorado Geographic Naming Advisory recommended unanimously that the name be changed to Mount Blue Sky.

On March 3, 2023, Governor Jared Polis formally asked the United States Board on Geographic Names to rename the mountain to Mount Blue Sky. The board delayed any decision after the Northern Cheyenne Tribe requested a consultation, with tribal administrator William F. Walks Along saying the proposed name "conflicted with his nation’s use of the term in their confidential sacred ceremonies." On September 15, 2023, the BGN voted to change the name, becoming effective immediately. Despite the peak's name change, the efforts to make a corresponding name change for the Mount Evans Wilderness Area still require congressional approval.

On October 16, 2023, Joe Neguse (Colorado-2 Democrat) introduced H.R. 5962 to the 118th Congress, titled "To redesignate the Mount Evans Wilderness as the 'Mount Blue Sky Wilderness', and for other purposes".

== See also ==
- List of mountain peaks of North America
  - List of mountain peaks of the United States
    - List of mountain peaks of Colorado
      - List of Colorado fourteeners
- Mount Blue Sky Scenic Byway — Colorado State Highway 5
- Mount Evans Hill Climb
