= Mount Evans Wilderness =

Wilderness area in Colorado, U.S.

- IUCN category Ib (wilderness area)
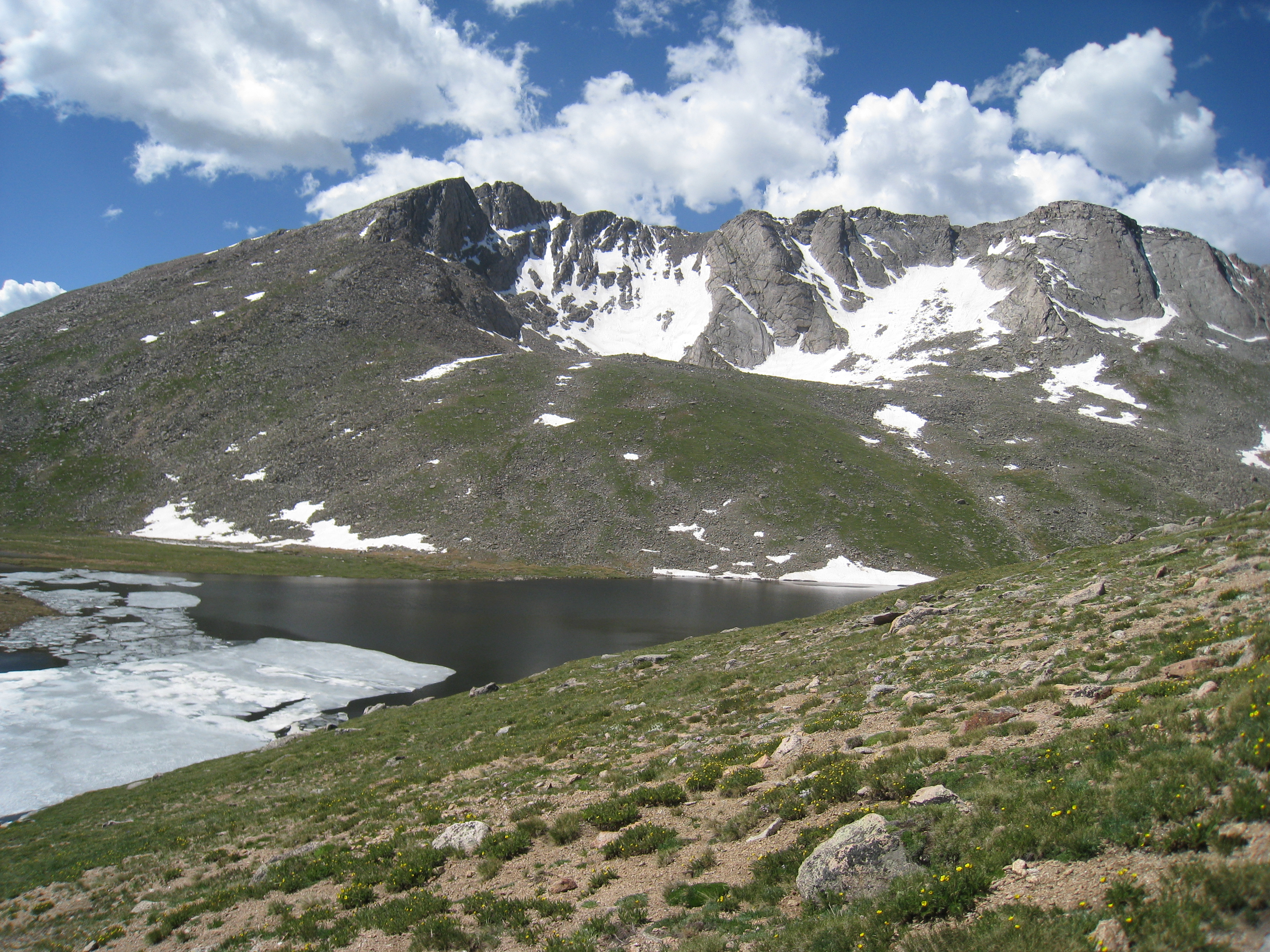
- Mount Blue Sky (formerly Mount Evans) and Summit Lake

- Location within the United States
- Location: Clear Creek County / Park County, CO, USA
- Nearest city: Idaho Springs
- Coordinates: 39°35′16″N 105°38′34″W
- Area: 74,401 acres (301.09 km^{2})
- Established: 1980
- Governing body: U.S. Forest Service

The Mount Evans Wilderness is a U.S. Wilderness Area in Arapaho National Forest and Pike National Forest about 30 miles (48 km) west of Denver, Colorado. The wilderness area is named after Mount Blue Sky's former name, Mount Evans.

== History ==
The first efforts to protect the Mount Evans (now known as Mount Blue Sky) area involved the purchase of Echo Lake Park and Summit Lake Park as part of the system of parks designed by Frederick Law Olmsted Jr. for the Denver Mountain Parks. This effort led to a proposal for a National Park overlapping, to a significant extent, what is now the Mount Evans Wilderness Area.

The first large tract of land in what is now the Mount Evans Wilderness area to be formally protected was the Abyss Lake Scenic Area in Pike National Forest, protecting the Abyss Lake cirque and much of the Lake Fork of Scot Gomer Creek, a tributary of Geneva Creek that drains the south side of Mount Blue Sky. This area was designated prior to 1955.
