= Mount Blue Sky Scenic Byway =

Colorado Scenic and Historic Byway

Coordinates: 39.5883°N 105.6438°W

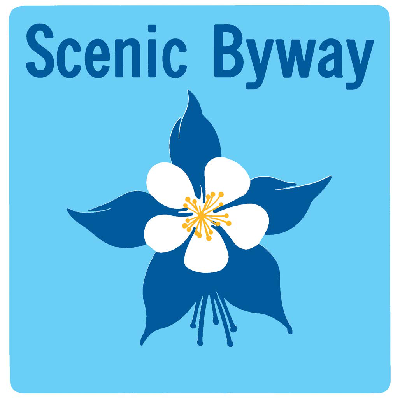
Mount Blue Sky Scenic Byway

Route information
- Maintained by CDOT
- Length: 49 mi (79 km)
- Existed: 1991–present

Major junctions
- North end: SH 103 / I-70 Exit 240 Idaho Springs
- East end: SH 74 Bergen Park

Location
- Country: United States
- State: Colorado
- Counties: Clear Creek, Jefferson

Highway system
- Scenic Byways; National; National Forest; BLM; NPS; Colorado State Highway System; Interstate; US; State; Scenic

The Mount Blue Sky Scenic Byway is a 49-mile (79 km) National Forest Scenic Byway and Colorado Scenic and Historic Byway located in Clear Creek and Jefferson counties, Colorado, United States. The byway ascends to 14,140 feet (4,310 m) of elevation near the 14,271-foot (4,350 m) summit of Mount Blue Sky, (Note: In September 2023, Mount Evans was renamed to Mount Blue Sky.) making it the highest paved road in North America (beating the 14,115-foot (4,302 m) Pikes Peak Highway by only 25 feet (8 m).) The byway visits Echo Lake Park, the Mount Goliath Natural Area, the Dos Chappell Nature Center, and Summit Lake Park on its way to the summit. A fee is charged to travel State Highway 5 to the summit and vehicles over 30 feet (9.1 m) long are not allowed, although they are allowed on State Highway 103 which reaches its highest elevation of 11,020 feet (3,359 m) at Juniper Pass.

The byway connects to the Lariat Loop Scenic and Historic Byway at Bergen Park.

== Route ==
The byway begins at the Idaho Springs Visitor Center. Take Exit 241 off Interstate 70 for 1 mile. Stop at the Visitor Center for information, then continue on Miner Street to 13th Avenue which is State Highway 103 and continues on State Highway 5 through a corridor between the Mount Evans Wilderness where it ends near the summit of Mount Blue Sky. The byway is 28 miles (45 km) in length and gains over 7,000 feet (2,100 m) of elevation. Achieving a final elevation of 14,140 feet (4,310 m), this is the highest paved road in North America.

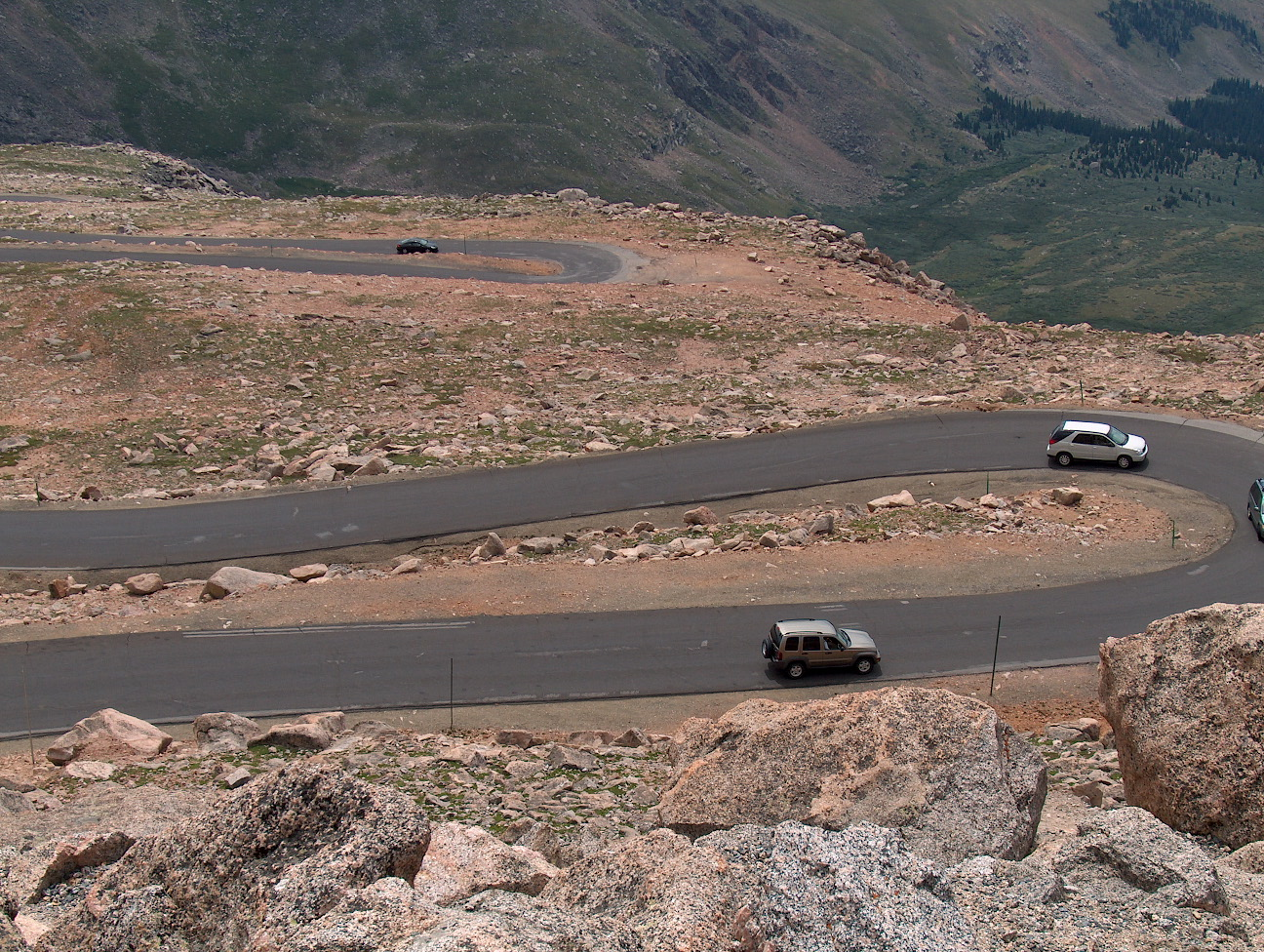
The Mount Blue Sky Scenic Byway approaching the summit

The road was originally planned by the Denver Mountain Parks system to link Summit Lake Park and Echo Lake Park to their lower altitude parks in the foothills. As originally planned, the road ran from Bergen Park near Evergreen to Echo Lake, and then to the summit, while the road from Echo Lake down into Chicago Creek Canyon was a secondary branch. From the start, the road was planned in terms of the scenic vistas along the way. The route was set by Frederick Law Olmsted Jr., and for a while, between 1915 and 1920, it was to be the primary access road for a proposed National Park comprising much of what is now the Mount Evans Wilderness Area.

There is a park fee charged if using parking lots and facilities along the upper portion of the byway. Prior to 2012, the Forest Service was charging anyone entering the highway at the entrance to Highway 5. This portion of the byway is often narrow, with sudden dropoffs that have no guardrails. It is typically accessible from Memorial Day weekend through Labor Day, although the amount of access and specific dates vary depending on the weather and road conditions. Construction for improvements to Highway 5 closed the highway in September 2024, and the highway will remain closed for all of 2025.

This route was designated a National Forest Scenic Byway on July 1, 1993 by the US Forest Service and has also been designated a Colorado Scenic Byway by the Colorado Department of Transportation.

== See also ==
- History Colorado
