= A Storm in the Rocky Mountains, Mt. Rosalie =

1866 oil painting by Albert Bierstadt

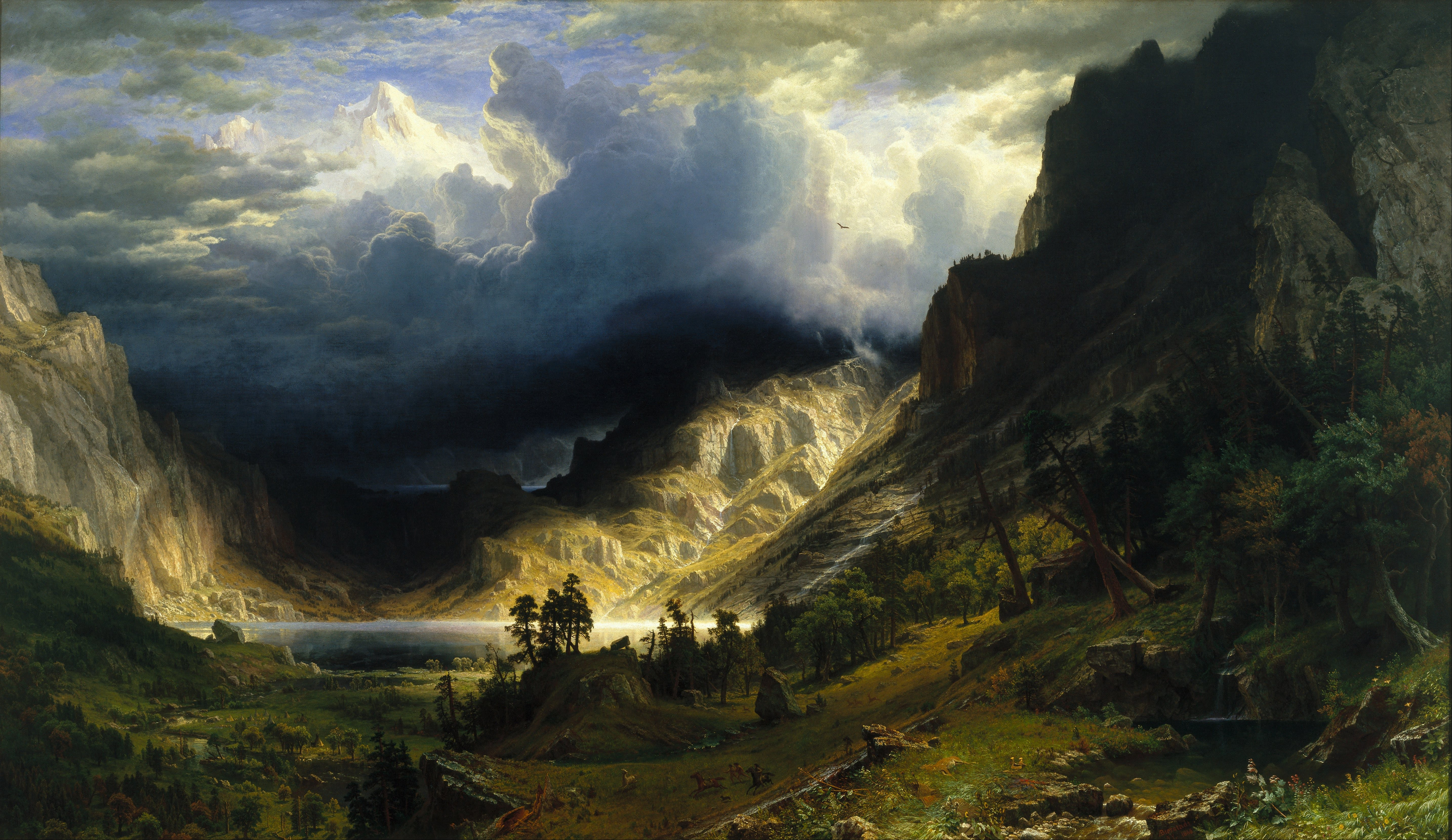
- Artist: Albert Bierstadt
- Year: 1866
- Medium: Oil on canvas
- Dimensions: 210.8 cm × 361.3 cm (83 in × 142.25 in)
- Location: Brooklyn Museum, Brooklyn
- Website: Collections: American Art

A Storm in the Rocky Mountains, Mt. Rosalie is an 1866 landscape oil painting by German-American painter Albert Bierstadt (1830–1902) which was inspired by sketches created on an 1863 expedition.

Bierstadt traveled to the Colorado Rocky Mountains where he was taken up to the Chicago Lakes beneath Mount Blue Sky. The painting is named after Bierstadt's mistress and, at the time, his friend's wife, Rosalie Osborne Ludlow. The painting, measuring at 210.8 × 361.3 cm (83.0 × 142.2 in), is exhibited at the Brooklyn Museum, which acquired it in 1976.

== Background ==
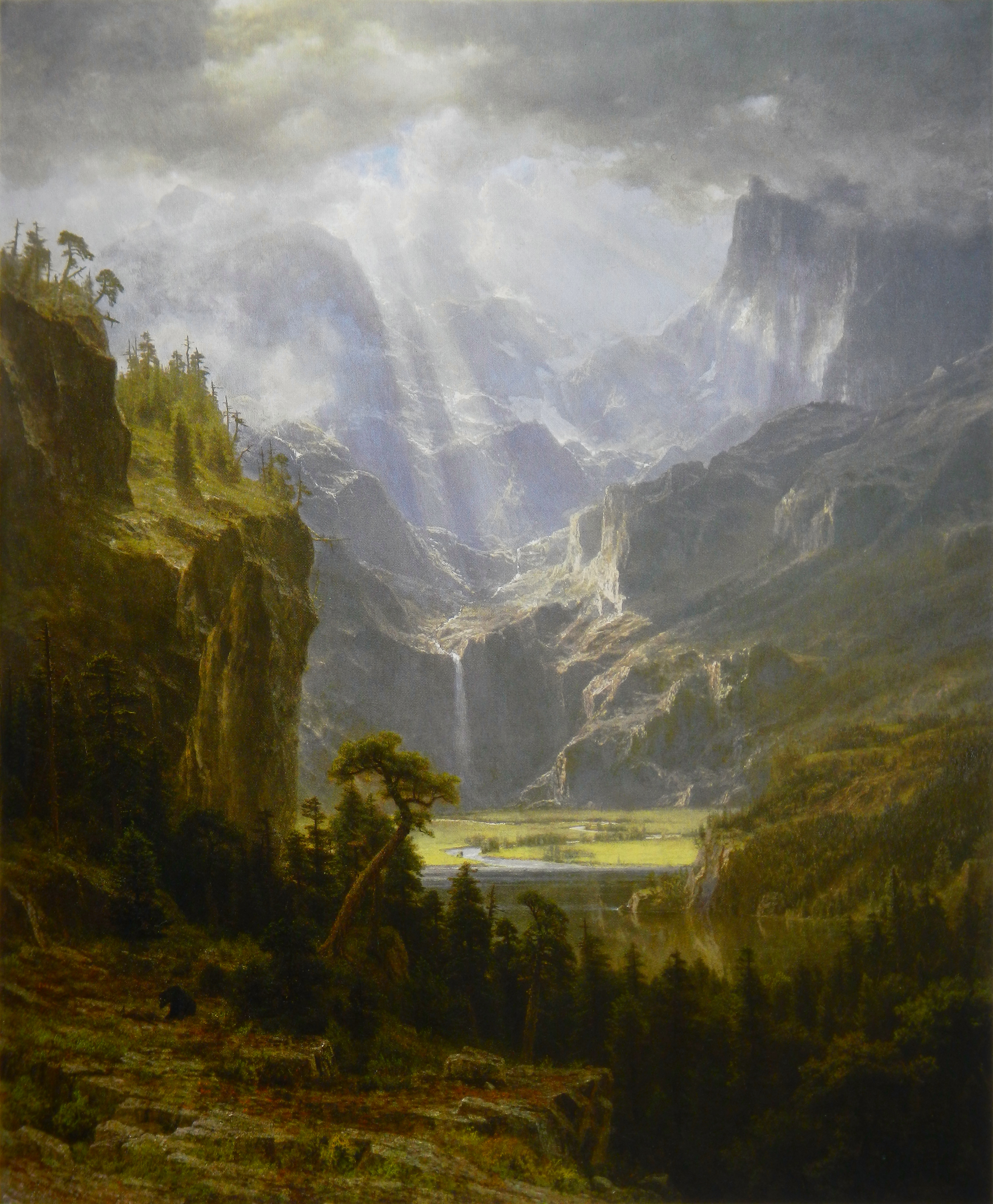
The Rocky Mountains, Lander's Peak, 1863. This smaller version was painted from sketches made during Bierstadt's 1859 expedition.

By the mid-19th century, the U.S. Government had begun sending surveying expeditions into the newly incorporated territories of the American West. Albert Bierstadt ventured on at least two of these expeditions, which, along with other trips in the West, would inspire an incredible amount of his creative output. On his first expedition in 1859, he joined U.S. explorer Frederick W. Lander, taking photographs of Native Americans and painting field sketches of the landscape. They traveled through Kansas, Nebraska, and into the Wind River Range of the Rocky Mountains in Wyoming. This expedition resulted in paintings such as On the Sweetwater Near the Devil's Gate, Nebraska; Thunderstorm in the Rockies; and most notably, two works similarly titled The Rocky Mountains, Lander's Peak.

A Storm in the Rocky Mountains, Mt. Rosalie was born from sketches created during his second expedition to the West in 1863. The voyage would take Bierstadt to the Colorado and Wyoming Rocky Mountains, then on to Salt Lake City, Utah, and into California, with stops at Lake Tahoe, San Francisco, and Yosemite. The expedition ended in Oregon by November 1863. After a journey totaling eight months, both Ludlow and Bierstadt returned to New York on 17 December.

== To the Rocky Mountains ==
Bierstadt desired to return to the West, "in search of a subject for a great Rocky Mountain picture", so in April 1863, he departed New York with his friend and explorer, Fitz Hugh Ludlow and two other gentlemen. They met Ludlow's wife, Rosalie Osborne, in St. Louis, Missouri, who accompanied them as far as Atchison, Kansas, the starting point for the Overland Trail stagecoach.

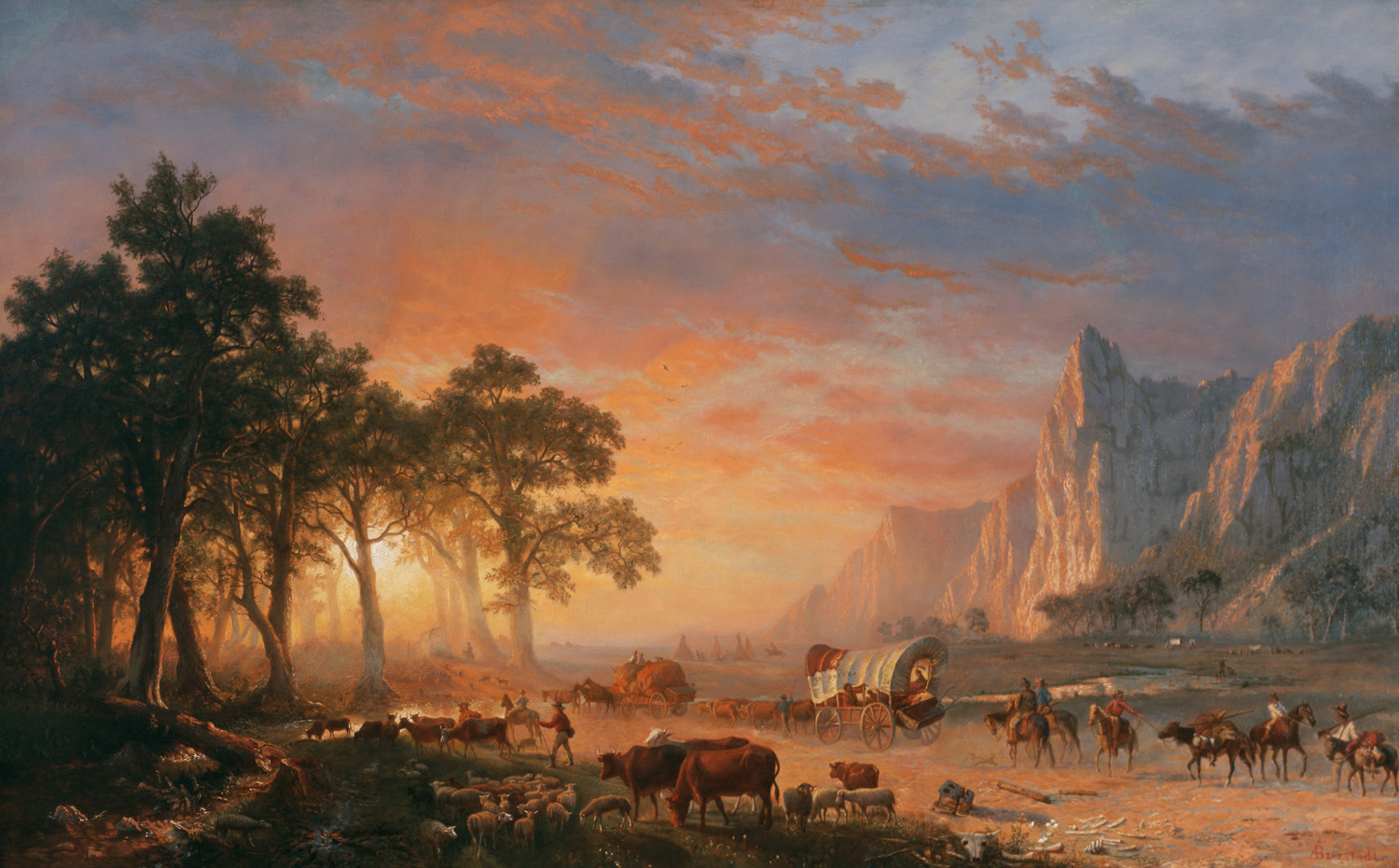
Emigrants Crossing the Plains, 1869. This painting was likely inspired by the 1863 expedition.

As they proceeded into and through Nebraska, Bierstadt would continuously sketch the land, weather, animals, and people around him. During this time, their party passed a fifty-wagon train of German emigrants who were headed to Oregon. This event most likely inspired several paintings of the Oregon Trail, including Emigrants Crossing the Plains and The Oregon Trail. It was also during this trip through Nebraska that Bierstadt produced a series of sketches titled The Last of the Buffalo, which were possibly referenced later on for his 1888 painting of the same name.

While still in the plains, the party stopped at a ranch to enjoy a buffalo hunt. Although Bierstadt did not participate, he was excited to paint the hunted animals. One of the men had wounded a bull and called to Ludlow to fetch Bierstadt. Ludlow described Bierstadt's set-up: "[Bierstadt] leapt from the buggy; out came the materials of success following him, and in a trifle over three minutes from his first halt, the big blue umbrella was pointed and pitched, and he sat under it on his camp-stool, with his color-box on his knees, his brush and palette in hand, and a clean board pinned in the cover of his color-box." Ludlow and two other men taunted the bull so "that [Bierstadt] may see him in action."

The party continued through Nebraska, before following the South Platte River toward Denver, Colorado. It was just after dawn when the expedition driver pointed westward and said, "There are the Rocky Mountains". Ludlow described his first view of the mountain range: "[T]o see an exquisite marine ghost appear, almost evanescent in its faint azure, but still a literal existence which had been called up from the deeps and laid to rest with infinite delicacy and difficulty, then you will form some conception of the first view of the Rocky Mountains."

=== Colorado Springs ===
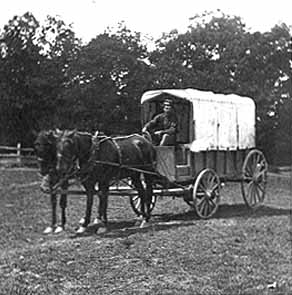
An example of an ambulance wagon from 1861.

Ludlow and Bierstadt's party rested in Denver for several days before deciding on a spontaneous 70-mile diversion to the south to visit the base of Pike's Peak and the Garden of the Gods near Old Colorado City (now a part of modern-day Colorado Springs). The journey would not have been possible because they lacked suitable vehicles, but Governor John Evans kindly lent the expedition his ambulance wagon and "a pair of stout serviceable" horses. Bierstadt rode with his color-box alongside the guide, following the ambulance in a buckboard pulled by a single horse. On 10 June, the six-person party set off after breakfast.

Thirty miles into their journey, they arrived at Castle Rock, "a peculiar hill of the butte kind, a single cone, rising abrupt and solitary out of the level plain to the height of about four hundred feet". Ludlow and another man hiked to the top, describing it as "the quietest, sunniest, most satisfying mount of vision we had yet climbed." Bierstadt stopped long enough to sketch the butte before continuing his way south.

The expedition spent three days at the base of Pike's Peak to explore the Fontaine qui Bouille (now called Fountain Creek), which allowed the men to bathe before beginning their work, making studies and collecting samples of the local geology. On reaching the actual springs, the men compared the tastes of each spring, created lemon-flavored soda, and bottled pure spring water to later compare with city water. The afternoon of their last day was spent in the Garden of the Gods. The men enjoyed squeezing into a narrow cavern and reaching "a vault about fifty feet long, ten feet high", which they examined by candlelight, and comparing the Garden's rock formations to recognizable shapes, including animals and "a statue of Liberty, standing by her escutcheon, with the usual Phrygian cap on her head." The men were so impressed by the landscape, that "[i]t was a great disappointment to some of our kind friends that our artist [Bierstadt] did not choose the Garden of the Gods for a 'big picture.' It was such an interesting place in nature that they could not understand its unavailability for art." Ludlow later surmised that, "however impressive it might be outdoors, [the scenery] was absolutely incommunicable by paint and canvas".

=== Idaho Springs ===
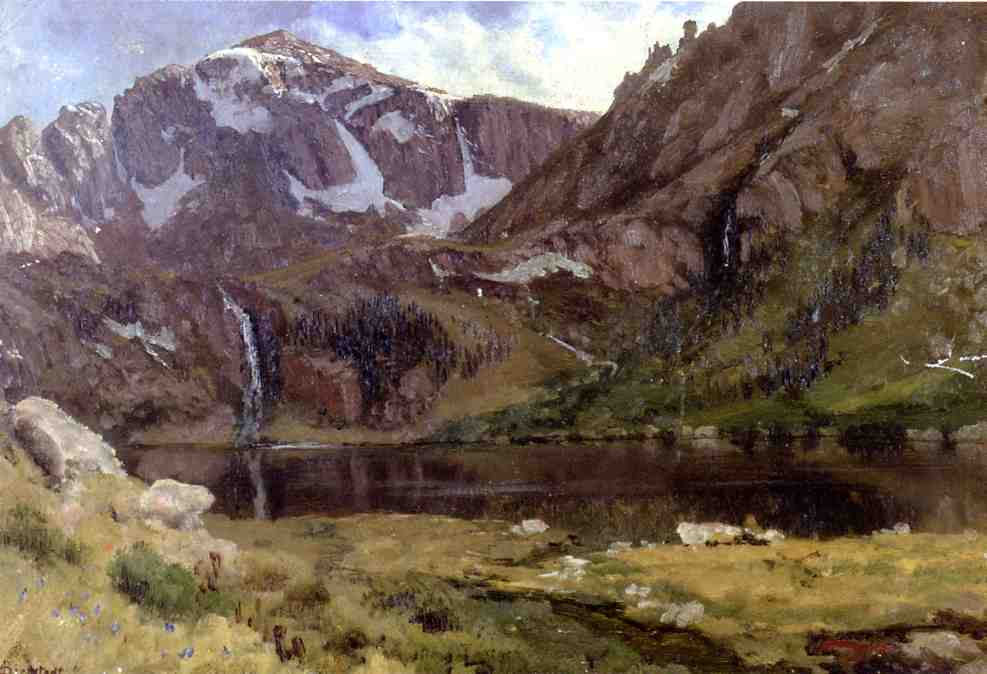
Mountain Lake, possibly 1863.

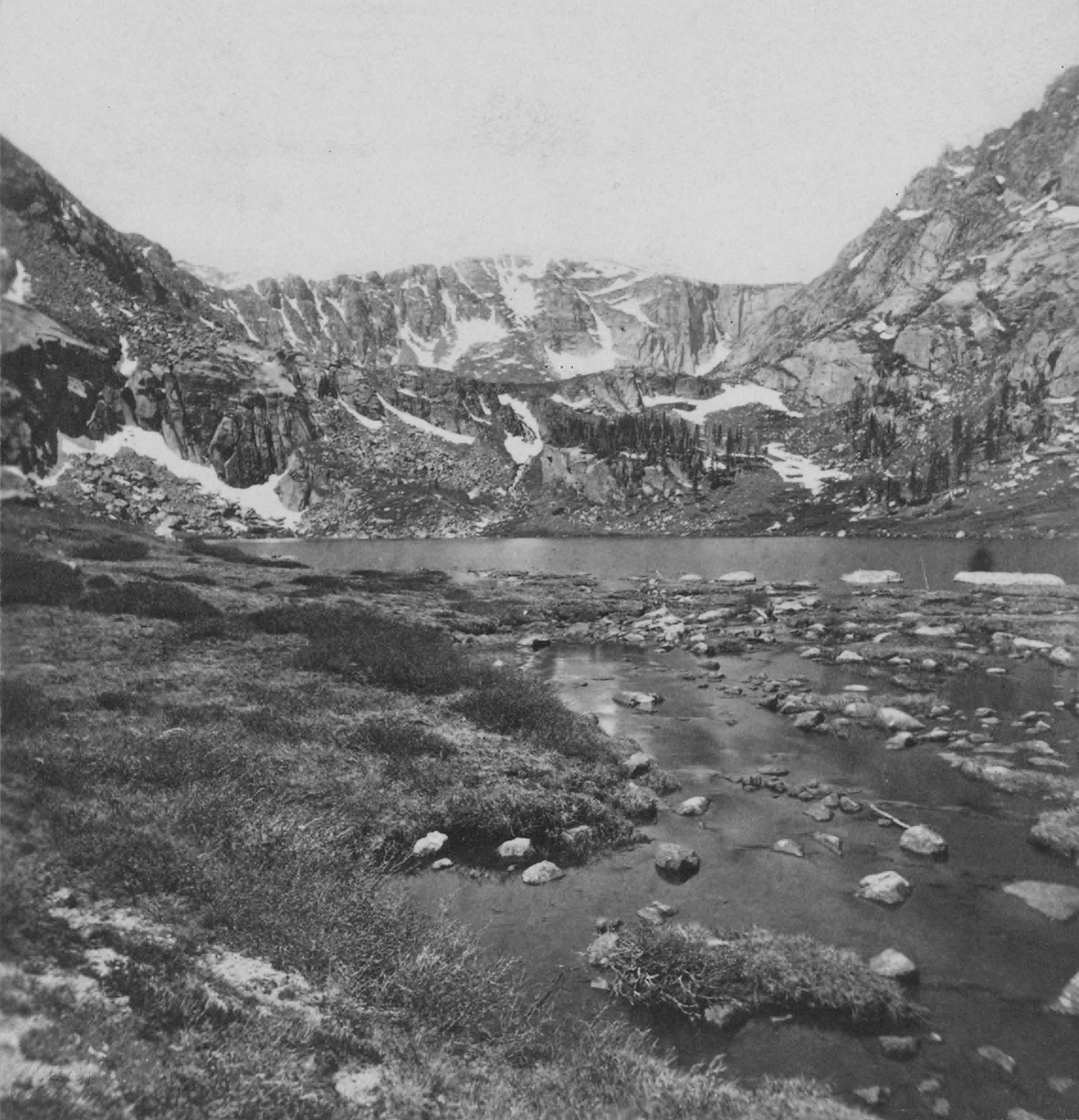
Chicago Lake, near Georgetown, 1873. Photographed by William H. Jackson. Mount Blue Sky appears in the far back left.

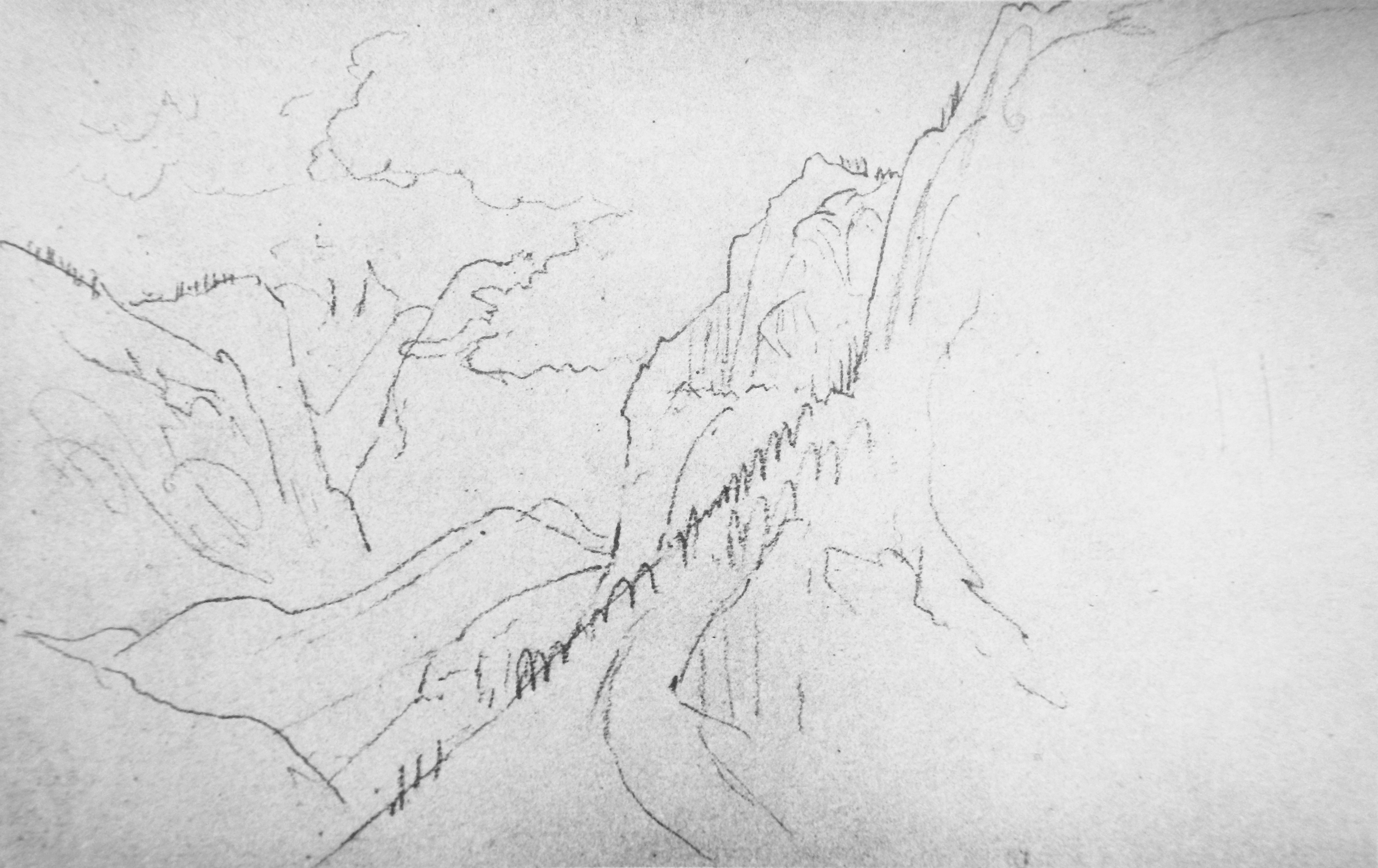
A sketch for Storm in the Rocky Mountains, possibly created in 1863, and believed to be the "earliest conception of the painting".

Upon their return to Denver, Bierstadt, still looking for a mountain subject, was referred to William N. Byers, founder and editor of the Rocky Mountain News, who considered himself "something of a mountain tramp". Byers knew the Chicago Lakes would impress the artist. Bierstadt separated from his expedition, and he and Byers rode a buckboard up to Idaho Springs, located 30 miles west of Denver. Byers would later write, "There we secured saddle animals and two or three donkeys to pack our bedding, provisions, paint-boxes, etc." Despite the rainy weather, they headed south from Idaho Springs further into the mountains, with Byers in the lead and Bierstadt behind the pack animals. They followed Chicago Creek through "dense forest" until they emerged into a "beautiful little flower-decked meadow". Byers rode out of Bierstadt's line of sight so that he could witness the artist's first impression of the valley.

Bierstadt emerged leisurely. His enthusiasm was badly dampened, but the moment he caught the view, fatigue and hunger were forgotten. He said nothing, but his face was a picture of intense life and excitement. Taking in the view for a moment, he slid off his mule, glanced quickly to see where the jack was that carried his paint outfit, walked sideways to it and began fumbling at the lash-ropes, all the time keeping his eyes on the scene up the valley.

Bierstadt told his guide, "I must get a study in colors; it will take me fifteen minutes!" The weather, however deteriorated, was impressive, and the view in front of Bierstadt included storm clouds drifting low over "sharp pinnacles and spires and masses of broken granite". Rays of sunlight broke through the cloud, and flowing down a mountain were "ribbons of water from the last hard shower [ ... ] reflecting back the sunshine." Byers patiently waited for his guest to complete his sketch. When finished, Bierstadt asked, "There, was I more than fifteen minutes?" to which Byers replied, "Yes, you were at work forty-five minutes by the watch!"

After continuing to Lower Chicago Lake, Bierstadt crossed the valley to sketch the landscape from a different vantage. Over the duration of their stay, Bierstadt "worked industriously [ ... ], making many sketches in pencil and studies in oil—these latter in order to get the colors and shade." One of these studies, Mountain Lake, was painted on the periphery of Lower Chicago Lake, featuring Mount Spalding. William Henry Jackson would take a photograph of Lower Chicago Lake ten years later in nearly the same spot that Bierstadt painted his study.

Byers took Bierstadt to Upper Chicago Lake before climbing "to the crest of the rim of the upper basin and to Summit Lake, and beyond that to the summit of the highest snowy peak in the group", which is both "the subject [in the painting]" and "is visible from the streets of Denver". The peak was unnamed at the time, so Bierstadt christened it "Mount Rosalie", after Ludlow's wife. Byers believed Bierstadt had named the peak "after one of the loftiest summits of the Alps".

Bierstadt and Byers's return trip to Denver was "uneventful" and Fitz Hugh Ludlow would get to look at Bierstadt's studies, which he later described as "some of the finest color studies he made along that [mountain] chain—among others an exquisite series of lakes on a mountain to whose very top he ascended with his color-box, a height of over 15,000 feet, or considerably taller than Mont Blanc." Ludlow marveled at the landscape sketches and their colors and especially of the main peak that Bierstadt had named:

That glorious roseate mountain stood nameless among the peaks in its virgin vail of snew [sic, "veil of snow"]; so Bierstadt, by right of first portrayal, baptized it after one far away from our sides, but very near and dear to our hearts—a gentle nature who had followed us clear to the verge of our Overland wanderings at Atchison, and parted from us bravely lest she should make our purpose fainter by seeming moved. Henceforth that shining peak is Monte Rosa.

On 23 June 1863, Bierstadt and Byers left Denver to continue their journey to California. The expedition's two other men would meet up with them at a later point.

=== Rosalie ===
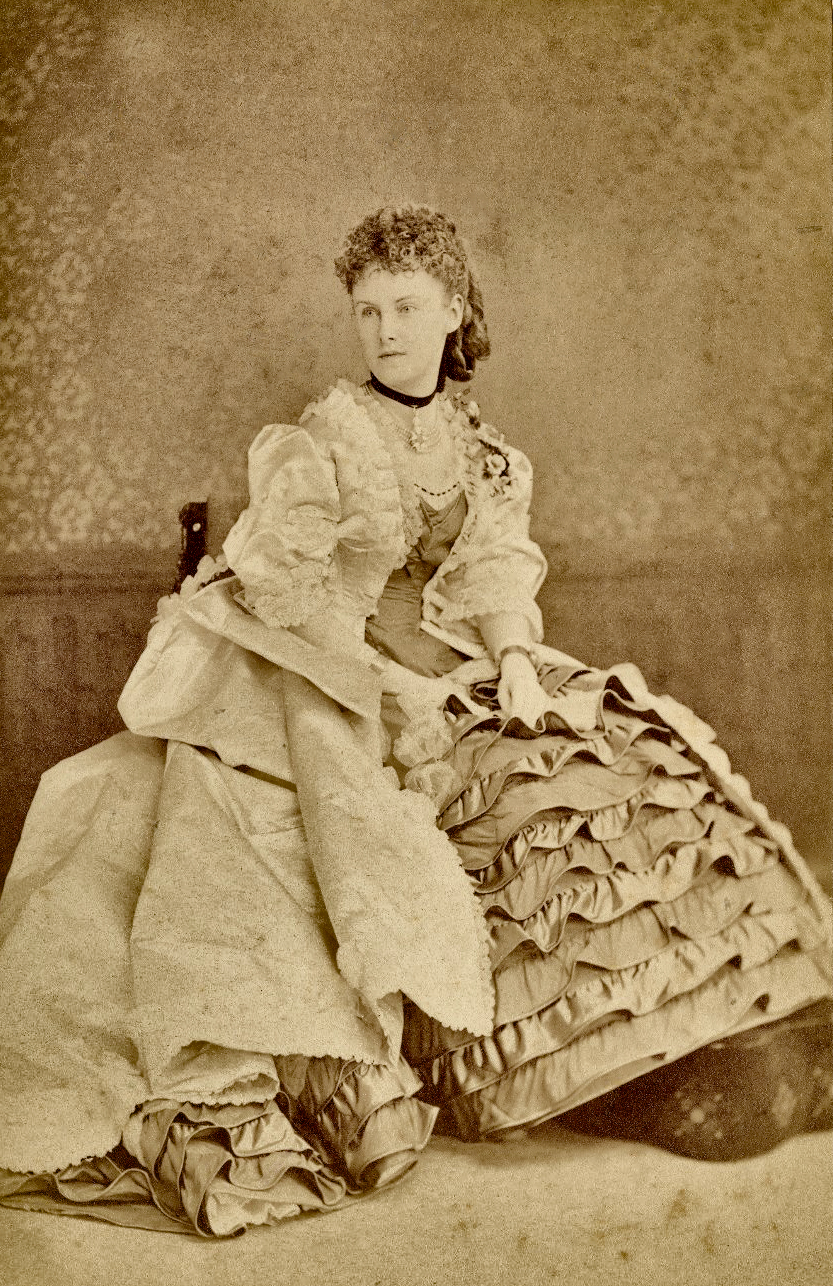
Rosalie Osborne Bierstadt, unknown date.

By 1857, Fitz Hugh Ludlow had become a known hashish addict and the bestselling author of The Hasheesh Eater. In 1859, he married Rosalie Osborne in her hometown of Waterville, New York. Her mother had reservations about Ludlow, who continuously struggled with finances. At one point, Rosalie was forced to write at least one job inquiry for him in a letter that could have been construed as flirtatious.

Bierstadt returned to his studio in New York and, in 1866, completed his oil painting, one of many inspired by field sketches made during that trip. He named the painting after his mistress, Rosalie Osborne, whom he had married on November 21, 1866.

== Description ==
The painting depicts Native American hunter/gatherers hunting deer in the foreground. A Native American encampment resides by a stream in the distance. The mountains are thrown into either sunlight or the darkness of a thunderstorm. In order to increase its dramatic value, Bierstadt exaggerated the scale of the Rocky Mountains.

Peering through a break in the clouds in the far distance is a snow-capped Mt. Rosalie, named after Bierstadt's wife.

Upon its completion, the painting toured the United States for a year. On 7 February 1866, A Storm in the Rocky Mountains, Mount Rosalie exhibited for one day and evening at the Somerville Art Gallery in New York City as a benefit for the "Nursery and Child's Hospital".

== See also ==
- List of works by Albert Bierstadt
