= Crest House =

- Crest House circa 1950
- Interactive map of the Crest House area

General information
- Architectural style: Organic, Futuristic, Art Moderne
- Location: Mount Blue Sky, Colorado
- Coordinates: 39°35′19″N 105°38′34″W
- Elevation: 14,120 ft (4,304 m)
- Construction started: 1940
- Completed: 1941
- Cost: $50,000
- Owner: U.S. Forest Service

Design and construction
- Architect: Edwin A. Francis
- Main contractor: Justus "Gus" Roehling

The Mount Evans Crest House is a building, now in ruins, located at the summit of Mount Blue Sky in Colorado. It is notable for both its significant architectural design and its unusual location. Built at the terminus of the Mount Blue Sky Scenic Byway, it was the highest business structure in the United States. Constructed between 1940 and 1941, it served as a restaurant, gift shop and tourist attraction until it was partially destroyed by a fire in 1979.

== History ==
Inspired by his first visit to Mount Blue Sky in the 1920s, carpenter and German immigrant Justus "Gus" Roehling dreamed of constructing a "Castle in the Sky" for his then girlfriend (and future wife) Edith.

Financial backing was provided by Thayer Tutt (owner of similar attractions atop Pikes Peak and the Broadmoor Hotel in Colorado Springs), and Quigg Newton, future mayor of Denver. With a design by notable Colorado architect Edwin A. Francis, ground was broken in the spring of 1940.

Roehling, his wife and his crew lived in tents at the Mt. Blue Sky Summit while construction was taking place. The extreme environment provided many challenges. No company would insure the building against loss or provide performance bonds during construction. Cold, damp conditions provided difficulties getting concrete to cure. All the materials had to be hauled to the summit or fabricated on site, and the high elevation afforded a building season limited only to summer months.

With winter fast approaching, Roehling and his team were forced to abandon the uncompleted structure in fall of 1940. Upon returning in spring of 1941, Roehling found that much of the glass and woodwork had been destroyed during the hard alpine winter. Undeterred, Roehling and his team repaired the damage and completed construction by the fall of 1941.

Crest House opened to much fanfare in fall of 1941. Amenities provided to travelers by Crest House included a restaurant, gift shop, rest rooms, emergency oxygen, and an observation deck. It was particularly well known for its fried doughnuts, coffee, and hot chocolate. Early employees were Denver area college students on their summer break, who resided in bunks located in the rear of the building.

Thayer's Broadmoor Hotel Company operated the Crest House until 1956, when it was sold to the Stewart Corporation, which also operated the Pikes Peak Summit House. Under the terms of the original lease agreement, ownership reverted to the U.S. Forest Service in 1969.

== Destruction ==
On 1 September 1979, an employee of a propane company failed to secure a safety valve while filling a propane tank on site, and fire broke out. All the occupants were evacuated safely, and although the volunteer fire department from Idaho Springs responded quickly, high winds and a lack of water hampered their efforts to contain the fire.

Most of the steel, glass, and wood timbers, paneling, and flooring were destroyed in the fire, leaving only the cast concrete walls and outer stonework. The U.S. Forest service received a $450,000 settlement from the propane company for the loss—insufficient to cover the estimated $2 million in restoration costs, so the funds were used to rehabilitate the ruins into an observation platform.

== Design ==
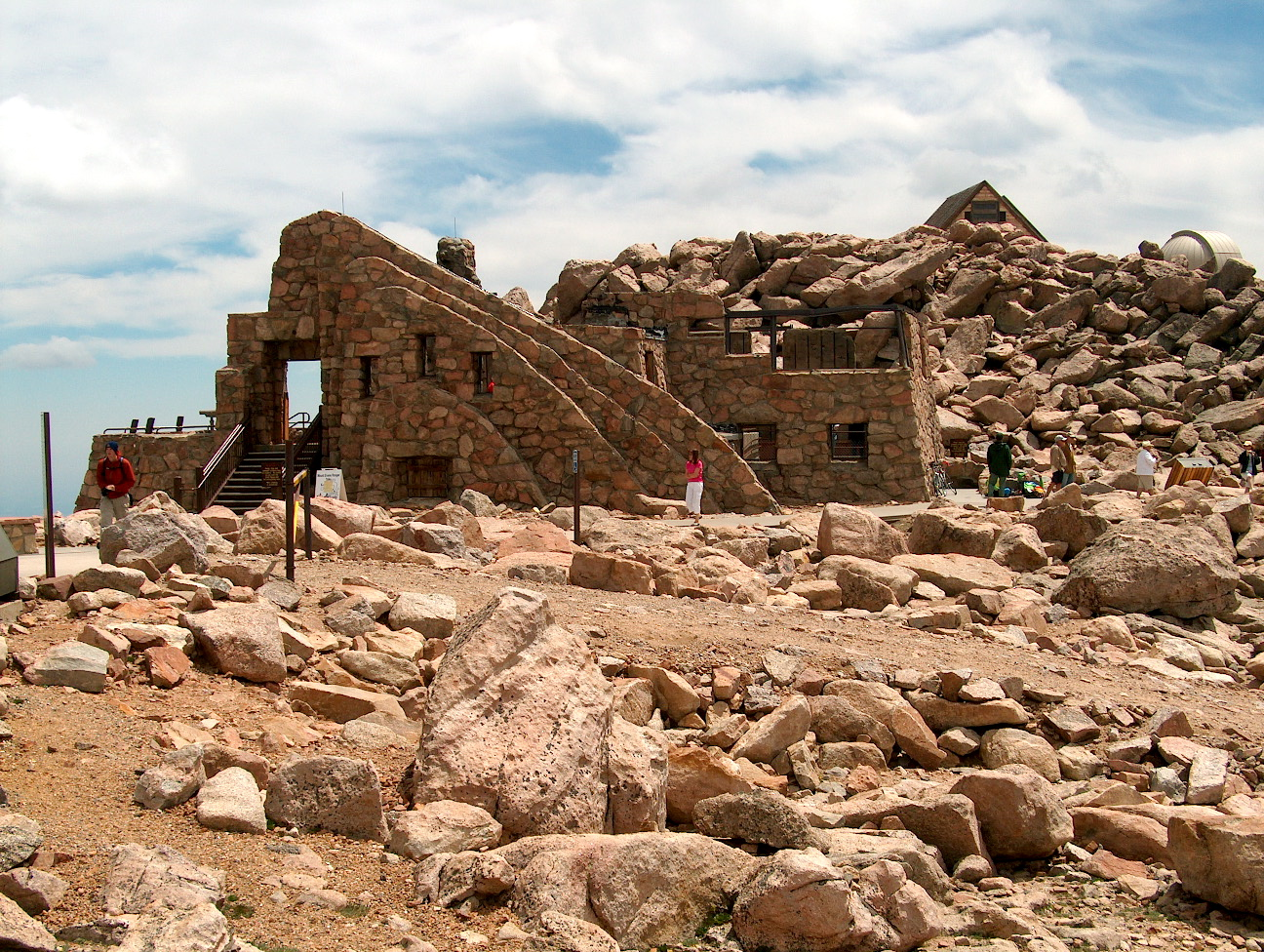
Partially reconstructed ruins of Crest House

Crest House represents a mixture of several different architectural styles, including Organic, Futuristic, Art Moderne.

The overall design is intended to evoke a shooting star, with moon-shaped light fixtures inside completing the motif.

The highlight of the design was the two-story star-shaped glass and steel platform. The upper floor housed an observation platform, while the lower floor housed the coffee shop. The star-shaped foundation is still evident on the observation platform today.

The other main design feature are the four stone arches that flowed from the star platform that housed the main entrance to the building. These arches, like the rest of the concrete portions of the building, were faced with native stone, in order to better blend in with the environment. In fact, it blends in so well that the building can be difficult to see from a distance. These arches are still standing today.

The interior was purportedly of an old-world style that Gus Roehling was fond of. This included details such as knotty paneling, sturdy timbers, hardwood floors, and heavy doors.
