= Lariat Loop Scenic and Historic Byway =

Colorado Scenic and Historic Byway

Coordinates: 39.7290°N 105.2374°W

Lariat Loop Scenic and Historic Byway

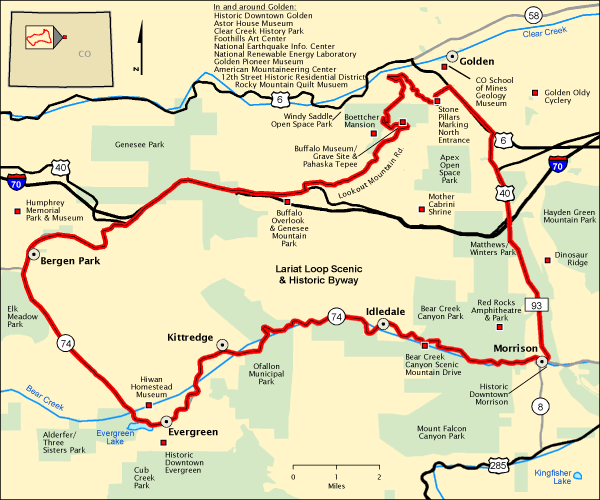

Route information
- Maintained by CDOT
- Length: 40 mi (64 km)
- Existed: 2002–present

Major junctions
- North end: US 6 Golden
- South end: SH 74 Golden

Location
- Country: United States
- State: Colorado
- Counties: Jefferson

Highway system
- Scenic Byways; National; National Forest; BLM; NPS; Colorado State Highway System; Interstate; US; State; Scenic

The Lariat Loop National Scenic and Historic Byway is a National Scenic Byway and a Colorado Scenic and Historic Byway located in Jefferson County, Colorado, USA. The byway is a 40-mile (64 km) loop in the Front Range foothills west of Denver through Golden, Lookout Mountain Park, Genesee Park, Evergreen, Morrison, Red Rocks Park, and Dinosaur Ridge. The Lariat Loop connects to the Mount Blue Sky Scenic Byway at Bergen Park.

== Route ==
The byway includes portions of State Highway 93 between Golden and Morrison, State Highway 74 from Morrison to Evergreen via Bear Creek Canyon, and the same road north to Interstate 70, which bisects the loop. The Lariat Trail connects Golden with the top of Lookout Mountain and Lookout Mountain Road completes the loop back to Interstate 70. This route formed the foundation for the surrounding 150-square-mile (390 km^{2}) area’s designation as a Colorado Heritage Area in 2000; the Byway was so designated by the Colorado Dept. of Transportation and Governor Owens in April 2002. The Lariat Loop connects to the Mount Blue Sky Scenic Byway via Jefferson County Road 66 (formerly Squaw Pass Road).

The Lariat Loop Byway blends natural, cultural, and historic attributes in a route that has been promoted as a tourist destination since 1914 and can be enjoyed in a half-day’s drive from Denver. Along the route are dozens of historic sites, scenic parks, and other attractions (see list below), many of which are listed on the National Register of Historic Places. Although the Lariat Loop is not listed, it comprises two registered routes, the Bear Creek Canyon Scenic Mountain Drive and the Lariat Trail Scenic Mountain Drive.

The Lariat Loop encompasses parts of Denver’s original “circle drives,” within the unique Denver Mountain Parks system designed by F.L. Olmsted, Jr, in 1914. The diverse geography of the foothills setting offers dense forests, mountain vistas, winding roads, rocky outcrops and ridges, and historic “beauty spots.” Many of these scenic areas have become county or city parks and are accessible to the public.

All roads along the Lariat Loop Byway are accessible via passenger vehicle, with convenient services, year-round. Open Space and Mountain Parks are protected areas and all wildlife and plants are protected.

== Attractions ==
- Golden, Colorado
- Windy Saddle Park
- Lookout Mountain Park
  - Buffalo Bill Museum and Grave
- Lookout Mountain Preserve and Nature Center
- Genesee, Colorado
- Genesee Park
  - Chief Hosa Lodge
- El Rancho, Colorado
- Fillius Park
- Bergen Park, Colorado
- Elk Meadow Park
- Evergreen, Colorado
  - Dedisse Park
  - Evergreen Lake
  - Hiwan Homestead Museum
- Kittredge, Colorado
- O'Fallon Park
- Corwina Park
- Lair O'the Bear Park
- Little Park
- Idledale, Colorado
- Morrison, Colorado
  - Morrison Historic District
  - Morrison Natural History Museum
- Red Rocks Park
  - Red Rocks Amphitheatre
  - Red Rocks Park and Mount Morrison Civilian Conservation Corps Camp, a National Historic Landmark
- Dinosaur Ridge
- Matthews/Winters Park
  - Mount Vernon, Colorado
- Apex Park
- Golden, Colorado
  - Astor House Museum
  - Clear Creek History Park
  - Colorado Railroad Museum
  - Colorado School of Mines
    - Mines Museum of Earth Science
  - Coors Brewery (world's largest)
  - Foothills Art Center
  - Golden Pioneer Museum
  - Golden Visitors Center
  - National Renewable Energy Laboratory (NREL)
  - Rocky Mountain Quilt Museum

== Major intersections ==
The entire route is in Jefferson County.

Location	mi	km	Exit	Destinations	Notes
El Rancho				I-70 east / US 40 east	
El Rancho				US 40 west to I-70 west	
Morrison				SH 74 east	Byway continues onto Hogback Road north
Golden				US 40 west	Byway continues onto US 40 east
Golden				US 40 east	Byway continues onto Heritage Road
Golden				US 6 east	Byway continues onto US 6 west
Golden				US 6 west	Byway continues onto 19th Street west
				US 40 east	Byway continues onto US 40 west
			254	I-70 east	Byway continues onto I-70 west
			253	Chief Hosa	
			252	I-70 west	
1.000 mi = 1.609 km; 1.000 km = 0.621 mi

== Gallery ==
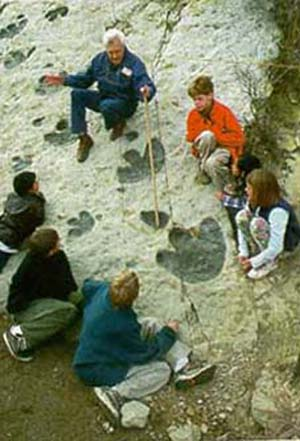
Dinosaur footprints along the Lariat Loop Scenic and Historic Byway

== See also ==
- History Colorado
