= Meyer–Womble Observatory =

Astronomical observatory in Colorado, USA

- Organization: University of Denver
- Observatory code: 707
- Location: Mount Blue Sky, Colorado
- Coordinates: 39.5870°N 105.6409°W
- Altitude: 4,326 meters (14,193 ft)
- Established: 1995
- Website: Mt. Evans Meyer–Womble Observatory

Telescopes
- Meyer Binocular Telescope: 0.7 m reflector (×2)

Meyer–Womble Observatory (MWO) is an astronomical observatory owned and operated by the University of Denver. It is located near the summit of Mount Blue Sky in the Arapaho National Forest approximately 60 kilometers (37 mi) west of Denver, Colorado (USA). At an elevation of 4,326 meters (14,193 ft), it is the third-highest optical/infrared observatory in the world, and was the highest until the Indian Astronomical Observatory opened in 2001.

Through a gift of $3.8 million from the estate of William Womble, construction of the facility began in 1995 and was completed in 1996. Eric Meyer, M.D., an anesthesiologist who designed the dual-aperture 0.72 m (28 in) f/21 Ritchey-Chretien telescope, and his wife, Barbara, donated $1 million and brought the optical components personally from Chicago. The optical/infrared telescopes saw first light in August 1997.

During the 2011–12 winter, the dome over the telescope was damaged by high winds, allowing snow to enter the observing area. The telescope was secured in early April 2012 by a mountaineer who hiked to the summit. A complete inspection of the damage did not take place until the road to the summit opened in May. During the following summer, the remains of the old dome were demolished and a new dome was fabricated. Installation of the new structure occurred on October 20, 2012.

== Decommissioning ==
Citing a lack of funds and interest, the University of Denver began decommissioning the observatory in 2018. The facility will be razed and the site will be abandoned.

== See also ==
- Chamberlin Observatory
- List of astronomical observatories
