= Echo Lake Park =

- U.S. National Register of Historic Places
- Colorado State Register of Historic Properties
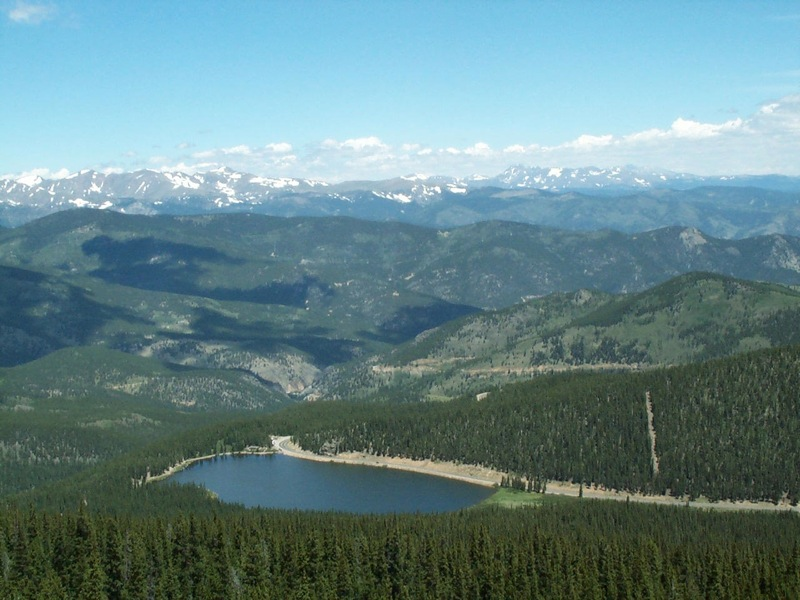
- Echo Lake from above
- Nearest city: Idaho Springs, Colorado
- Area: 600 acres (2.4 km^{2})
- Built: 1921, 1926
- Architect: Jacques Benedict
- Architectural style: Rustic
- MPS: Denver Mountain Parks MPS
- NRHP reference No.: 95000109
- CSRHP No.: 5CC.646
- Added to NRHP: February 24, 1995

Echo Lake Park is a park located along the Mount Blue Sky Scenic Byway about 33.5 mi (54 km) west of Denver, Colorado. The park provides a stone shelter with picnic tables and barbecue grills on one end of the lake, and the 1926 Echo Lake Lodge (gift shop and restaurant service only) and an Arapaho National Forest campground are found at the other. Access to backpacking trails, including the Chicago Lakes trail and Lincoln Lakes trail, can be found adjacent to the lake. The park is part of the Denver Mountain Parks system.

== Historic designation ==
Echo Lake Park was listed on the National Register of Historic Places in 1995. The listing included two contributing buildings, two contributing structures, and a contributing site on 600 acres (2.4 km^{2}). It included the Echo Lake Lodge, built in 1926, which was designed by Denver architect Jacques Benedict, a two-story octagonal log building on a base of local granite that resembles a Native American earth lodge.

Echo Lake, along with Mount Blue Sky, was designated as a historic site by the American Physical Society in 2017, in honor of many cosmic-ray physics experiments conducted at the lake and on the mountain between 1935 and 1960. The historic plaque is outside the Echo Lake Lodge.

== Echo Lake ==
Echo Lake
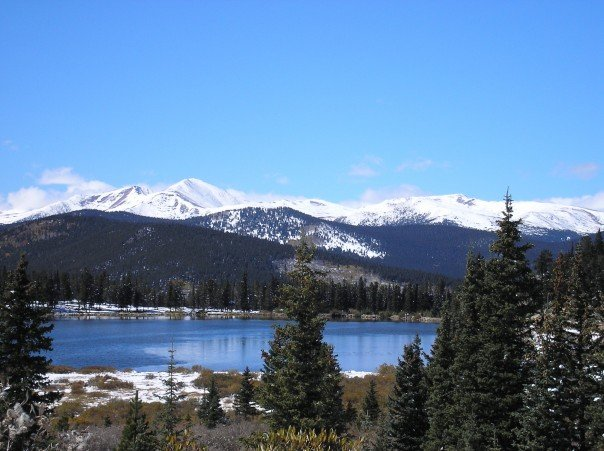
- After Year's First Snowfall

- Location within Colorado Location within the United States
- Location: Clear Creek County, Colorado, United States
- Coordinates: 39°39′30″N 105°36′12″W
- Type: oligotrophic
- Basin countries: United States
- Surface elevation: 10,600 ft (3,230 m)

Echo Lake is a shallow, oligotrophic lake situated at 10,600 ft (3,230 m) above sea level near Mount Blue Sky in the Colorado Rocky Mountains. It formed during the latest period of glaciation roughly 10,000 years ago. As glaciers retreated in the Chicago Creek valley, lateral moraines formed a natural dam to drainage, forming the lake. The ecosystem around the lake is dominated by Engelmann Spruce (Picea engelmannii) and Subalpine Fir (Abies lasiocarpa), with some Limber Pine (Pinus flexilis) on exposed sites.

== Climate ==
Climate data for Echo Lake 39.6581 N, 105.6029 W, Elevation: 10,630 ft (3,240 m) (1991–2020 normals)
Month	Jan	Feb	Mar	Apr	May	Jun	Jul	Aug	Sep	Oct	Nov	Dec	Year
Mean daily maximum °F (°C)	27.5 (−2.5)	28.3 (−2.1)	35.6 (2.0)	41.7 (5.4)	50.6 (10.3)	62.3 (16.8)	67.7 (19.8)	65.1 (18.4)	58.7 (14.8)	47.1 (8.4)	35.1 (1.7)	27.5 (−2.5)	45.6 (7.5)
Daily mean °F (°C)	18.2 (−7.7)	18.5 (−7.5)	24.7 (−4.1)	30.3 (−0.9)	39.1 (3.9)	49.2 (9.6)	54.9 (12.7)	53.0 (11.7)	46.6 (8.1)	36.2 (2.3)	25.6 (−3.6)	18.3 (−7.6)	34.6 (1.4)
Mean daily minimum °F (°C)	8.8 (−12.9)	8.7 (−12.9)	13.8 (−10.1)	18.9 (−7.3)	27.5 (−2.5)	36.2 (2.3)	42.0 (5.6)	40.9 (4.9)	34.6 (1.4)	25.4 (−3.7)	16.2 (−8.8)	9.1 (−12.7)	23.5 (−4.7)
Average precipitation inches (mm)	1.41 (36)	1.85 (47)	3.22 (82)	4.52 (115)	3.29 (84)	2.33 (59)	3.21 (82)	3.37 (86)	1.98 (50)	2.26 (57)	2.05 (52)	1.33 (34)	30.82 (784)
Average snowfall inches (cm)	24.4 (62)	33.9 (86)	54.4 (138)	61.1 (155)	25.9 (66)	4.3 (11)	0.0 (0.0)	0.1 (0.25)	11.0 (28)	25.8 (66)	39.9 (101)	20.1 (51)	300.9 (764.25)
Source 1: PRISM Climate Group
Source 2: NOAA (Mt Evans Research Station precipitation & snowfall)

== See also ==
- National Register of Historic Places listings in Clear Creek County, Colorado
- Summit Lake Park
- List of lakes in Colorado
