= Vasquez Peak Wilderness =

Wilderness area in Colorado, United States

- IUCN category Ib (wilderness area)
- Location within the United States
- Location: Grand County, Colorado, USA
- Nearest city: Winter Park, CO
- Coordinates: 39°49′00″N 105°50′00″W
- Area: 12,300 acres (5,000 ha)
- Established: 1993
- Governing body: U.S. Forest Service

The Vasquez Peak Wilderness is a U.S. Wilderness Area located southwest of Winter Park, Colorado. The 12,300-acre (5,000 ha) wilderness established in 1993 in the Arapaho and Roosevelt national forests has 15 miles (24 km) of trails.
