= Dedisse Park =

- U.S. National Register of Historic Places
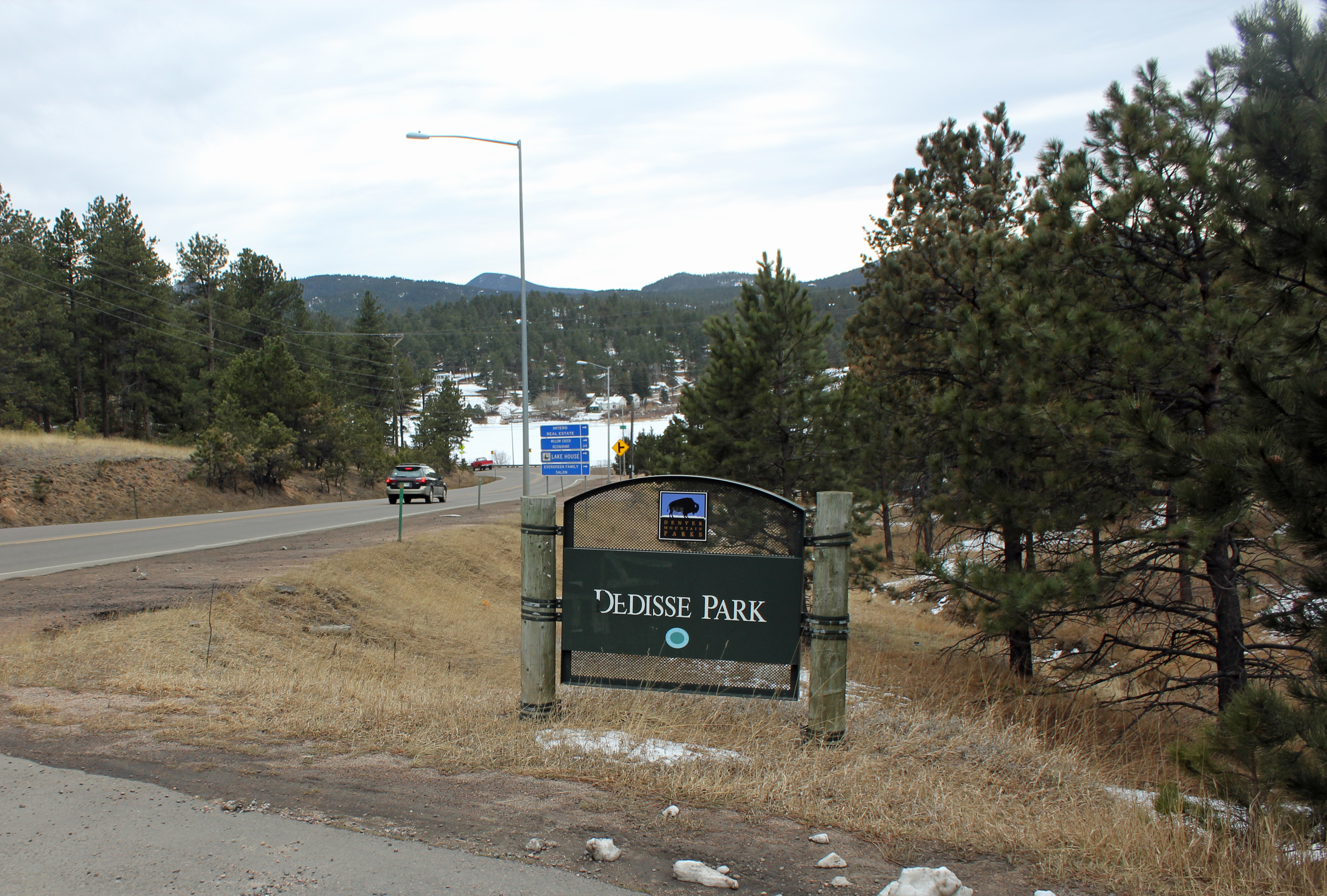
- The park in 2014.

- Location within Colorado Location within the United States
- Location: Evergreen, Colorado
- Coordinates: 39°38′03″N 105°20′00″W
- Area: 420 acres (1.7 km^{2})
- Built: 1927
- Architectural style: Rustic
- MPS: Denver Mountain Parks MPS
- NRHP reference No.: 90001709
- Added to NRHP: 1990-11-15

Dedisse Park is a Denver Mountain Park located in Jefferson County, Colorado, USA. It was originally the scenic mountain ranch of 1860s pioneer Julius C. Dedisse. This 420 acres (1.7 km^{2}) of land was awarded to the city of Denver in 1919 through a condemnation suit against the Dedisse family who received $25,000 in compensation for it. In 1927–1928, Denver constructed the 35-foot (11 m) high Evergreen dam as a flood control measure on the notoriously flood-prone Bear Creekcreating the 55-acre (220,000 m^{2}) Evergreen Lake which became an instant hit with recreationists in summer and winter. Colorado's first mountain golf course, the Evergreen Golf Course, was constructed here in 1925, which features the rustic lodge Keys on the Green restaurant.

== See also ==
- National Register of Historic Places listings in Jefferson County, Colorado
- Denver Mountain Parks
