= Summit Lake Park =

- U.S. National Register of Historic Places
- Colorado State Register of Historic Properties
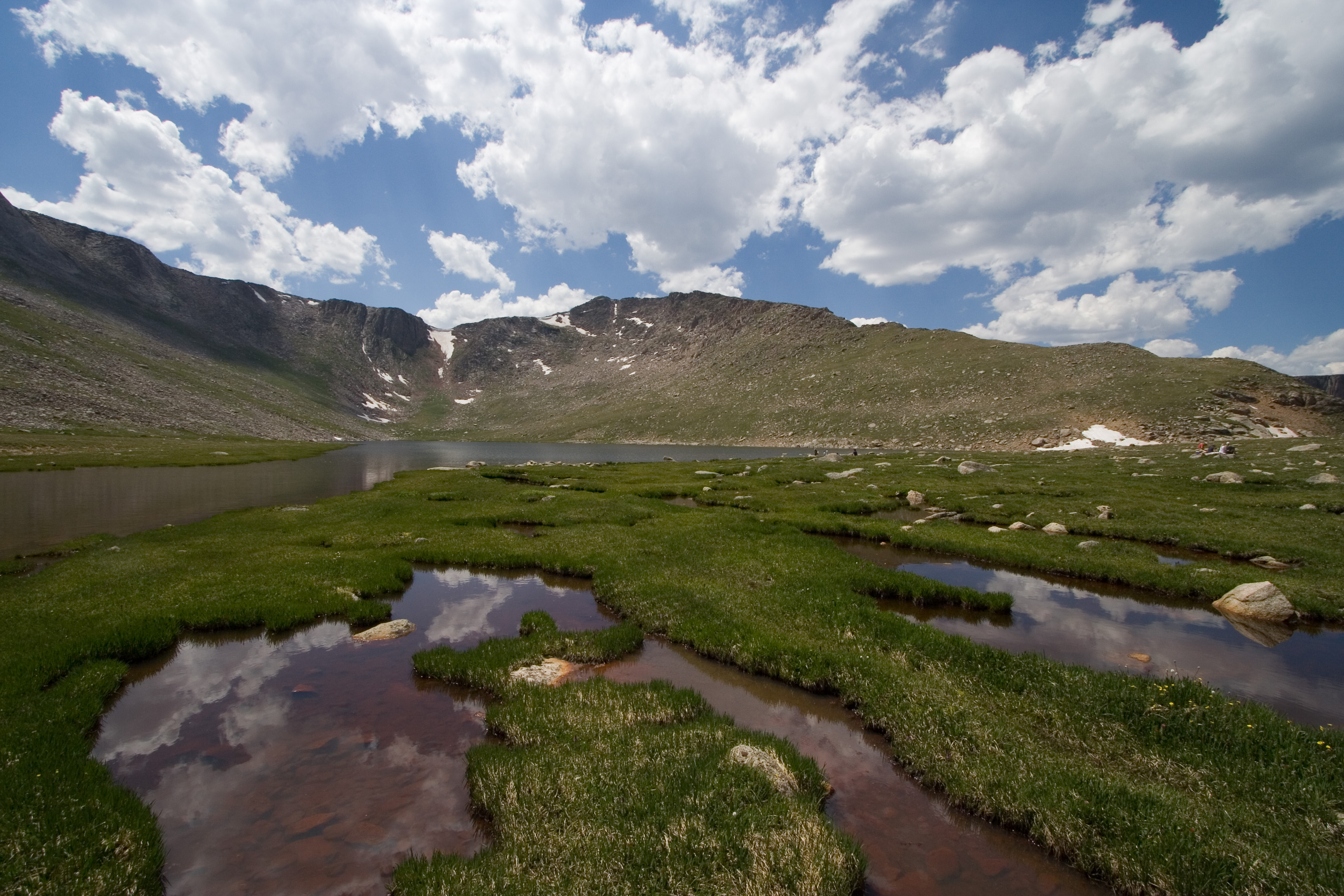
- Summit Lake Park
- Location: Clear Creek County, Colorado, US
- Nearest city: Idaho Springs, Colorado
- Coordinates: 39°35′55″N 105°38′39″W
- Built: 1924
- Architect: Benedict, Jules Jacques Benoit; CCC
- MPS: Denver Mountain Parks MPS
- NRHP reference No.: 95000110

U.S. National Natural Landmark
- Designated: April 1965
- CSRHP No.: 5CC.645
- Added to NRHP: February 24, 1995

Summit Lake Park is a park located along Mount Blue Sky Scenic Byway about 64 miles (100 km) west of Denver, Colorado. The park is 160 acres (0.65 km^{2}) in size and contains alpine tundra. Land to the east of the lake is in a state of permafrost which helps to prevent drainage of the area. During the summer, the park is filled with wildflowers, some of which have not been found anywhere else outside of the Arctic Circle. The park is named after Summit Lake, the headwaters of Bear Creek.

== Summit Lake ==
Summit Lake is a tarn which sits at 12,836 feet (3,912 m) elevation in a glacial cirque on the north face of Mount Blue Sky and the east face of Mount Spalding. To the north, there is a col (12,855 feet/3918 m elevation) looking down into the chain of two cirques holding the Chicago Lakes at the headwaters of Chicago Creek. By one count that includes several unnamed lakes, Summit Lake is the 13th highest lake in the United States. In 1915, the USGS reported that Summit Lake was the highest lake in Colorado, at 12,740 feet. Later secondary sources occasionally report it as the highest lake in the United States.

The land was acquired by Denver in 1924 and incorporated into the Denver Mountain Parks system. It was declared a National Natural Landmark in April 1965.

== See also ==
- National Register of Historic Places listings in Clear Creek County, Colorado
- Echo Lake Park
