= Bergen Park =

Park near Evergreen, Colorado, USA

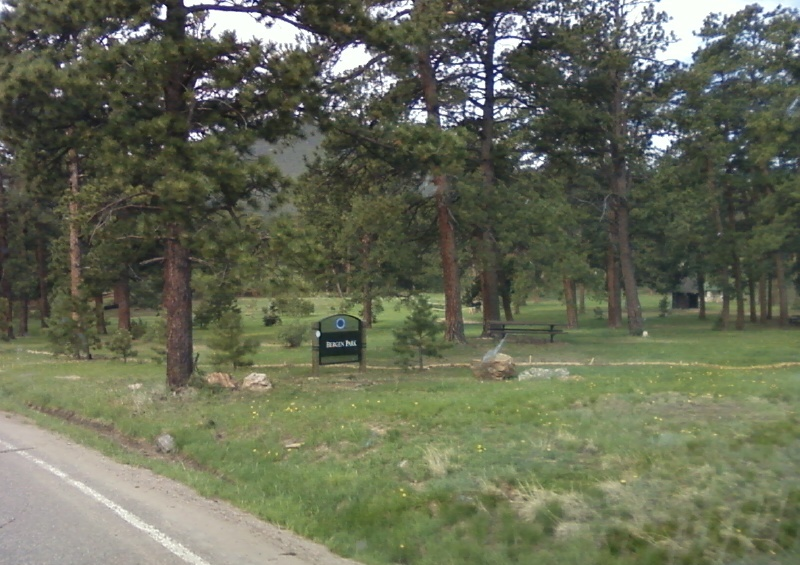

- Location within Colorado Location within the United States
- Type: city park
- Location: Evergreen, Colorado, USA
- Coordinates: 39°41′24″N 105°21′43″W
- Area: 25.1 acres (10.2 ha)
- Elevation: 7,798 feet (2,377 m)
- Operator: City and County of Denver
- Open: yes
- Bergen Park
- U.S. National Register of Historic Places
- U.S. Historic district
- Built: 1915
- Architect: Olmsted Brothers; J.J.B. Benedict
- Architectural style: Rustic
- MPS: Denver Mountain Parks MPS
- NRHP reference No.: 90001707
- Added to NRHP: November 15, 1990

Bergen Park is a park near Evergreen, Colorado. It is on the National Register of Historic Places.

Bergen Park was established in 1859 when pioneer settler Thomas Cunningham Bergen built a log cabin on his land and named his property.

== History ==
Thomas Cunningham Bergen (1820–1888) took up the first squatter's claim at the site, then known as Elk Park, in June 1859, and completed a log cabin there on July 4, 1859. "Bergen's Ranch" became a way station on the stagecoach and wagon road to the mines. Bergen served on the first Jefferson County Board of Commissioners from 1862 and was inducted into the Jefferson County Hall of Fame in 1993. He later moved to a farm near Morrison. The City and County of Denver acquired the ground for its mountain parks system on October 13, 1915, and the State Historical Society of Colorado and the city placed a monument to Bergen there on July 4, 1934. The park was listed on the National Register of Historic Places in 1990.

== See also ==
- Denver Mountain Parks
