= Denver Mountain Parks =

Park system in Colorado, United States

Denver Mountain Parks logo

The Denver Mountain Parks system contains more than 14,000 acres (5,700 ha) of parklands in the mountains and foothills of Jefferson, Clear Creek, Douglas, and Grand counties in Colorado, west and south of Denver.

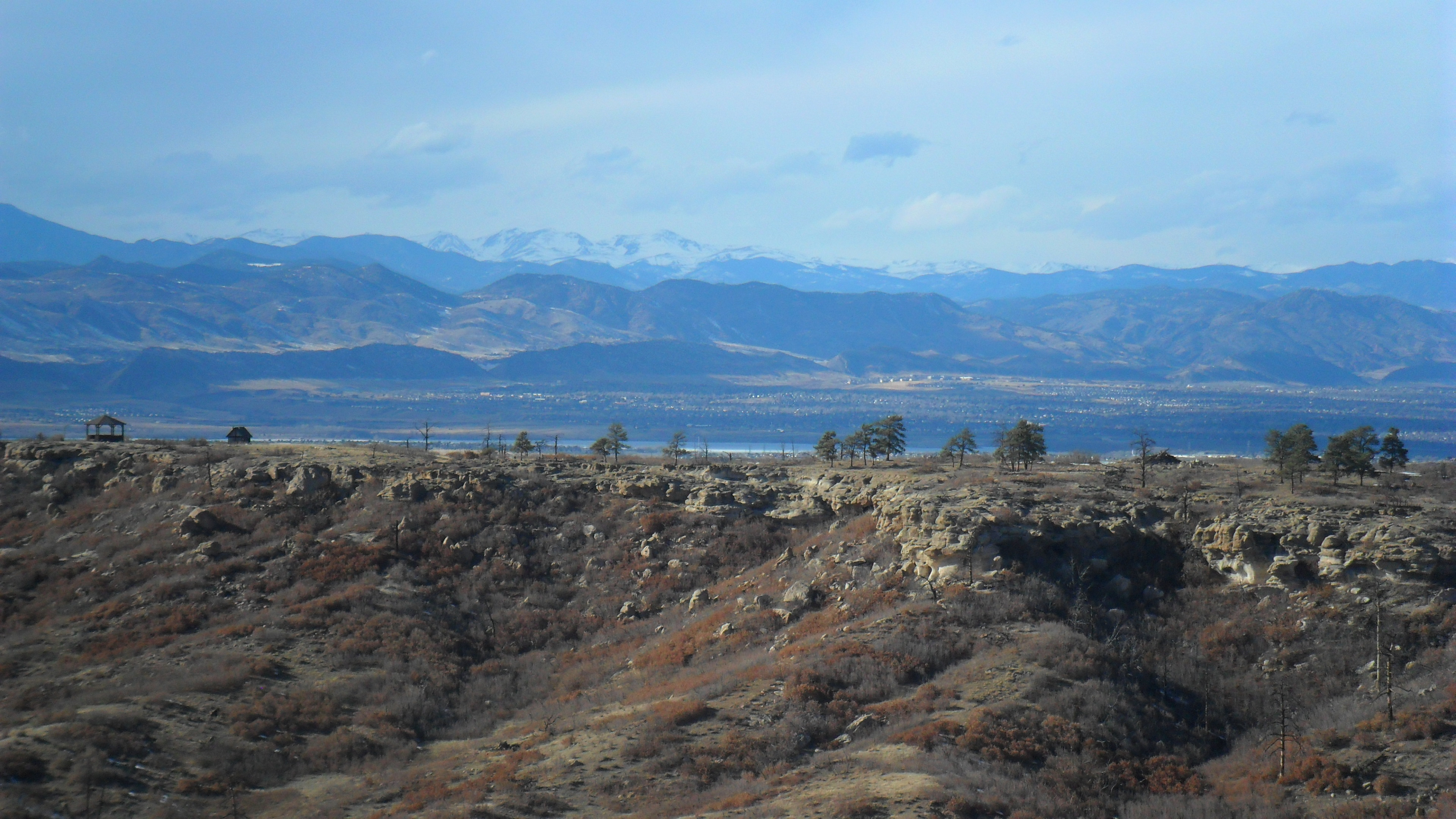
Daniels Park in Douglas County

Owned and maintained by the City and County of Denver, this historic system was launched in 1910 and required Congressional approval in 1914 for the city to purchase federal lands outside its municipal limits. The mountain parks system was created “for the purpose of assuring perpetually to the residents of Denver the sublime scenery of the Rockies, the preservation of native forests and having for all time a pleasure ground in the mountains for the thousands of annual visitors to the city easily accessible.”

The Denver Mountain Parks system currently consists of 22 developed parks and other undeveloped parklands that serve as open space, scenic viewsheds, and wildlife habitat. It ranges in elevation from 5,800 to 13,000 ft above sea level. Many of the parks have picnic areas and some have trails. J.J.B. Benedict designed many of the pavilions and shelters in these parks, using native stone and timber to create a “mountain architecture” style that blends into the natural sites. Two shelters, one in Genesee Park and one in Dedisse Park, were built in the late 1930s by the Civilian Conservation Corps.

The Denver Mountain Park properties encompass a variety of habitats, including prairie, mountain meadow, riparian forests, montane (ponderosa pine, Douglas fir) and subalpine (Engelmann spruce) forests, and alpine tundra. Bison herds were established in wildlife preserves at Genesee Park in 1914 and later in Daniels Park as part of an effort to recover this species extirpated from Colorado.

== History ==
Beginning in about 1909-10, the idea of a mountain park in the foothills west of Denver was promoted by John Brisben Walker and Denver's Mayor Robert W. Speer. Walker approached the Denver Real Estate Exchange, the Denver Chamber of Commerce, and the Denver Motor Club, and each of these appointed a committee to evaluate the idea. Later these were formed into a "Joint Committee of the Commercial Bodies." A city election in May 1912 gave voter approval to a mill levy to support the project.

In 1912, Frederick Law Olmsted Jr. was hired to plan the park system. Olmsted identified 41,310 acres (167 km²) of land that Denver should acquire for parks, mountain roads, and to protect scenic vistas. Acquisition of Genesee Park began in 1912; it was the first park established and, at 2,413 acres (9.7 km²), is still the largest. The last new parks were Red Rocks Park, purchased in 1927-28; O'Fallon Park and Newton Park, donated in 1939; and Winter Park, purchased in 1939. Daniels Park was also expanded at that time.

The major parks in the system were designated to the National Register of Historic Places in 1990 and 1995 as a result of multiple-property submissions that ultimately included sixteen parks. Two of the highways originally built by Denver in 1912-1914, the Bear Creek Canyon Scenic Mountain Drive and the Lariat Trail Scenic Mountain Drive, were also included in that designation. These drives today are part of the Lariat Loop Scenic & Historic Byway. The designated parks are listed at National Register of Historic Places listings in Jefferson County, Colorado.

Despite their historical significance, dedicated funding for the parks was eliminated in 1955 when they became part of the Denver Parks and Recreation Department. After that time, the parks were relatively neglected, a situation that led to the formation of the Denver Mountain Parks Foundation as an advocacy group in 2004. In 2008, the Foundation and the Department joined forces to create a Master Plan for the system, the first since the original Olmsted Plan. The Plan "examines the value of the Mountain Parks to the people of Denver; provides sustainable management strategies for the funding, marketing, and protection of the currently underfunded system; and proposes both large and small improvements for the next 5-20+ years, to take this system to a level of quality commensurate with its international status." For the plan, a new logo (above) was commissioned from artist Michael Schwab to help create an identity for the park system.

In 2013, the Denver Mountain Parks Foundation and the City of Denver marked the centennial of the park system with a book featuring park history, scenic and historic photographs, and a guide to the system. Denver Mountain Parks: 100 Years of the Magnificent Dream was released August 1, 2013, by John Fielder Publishing.

== List of Mountain Parks ==
Properties owned by the City & County of Denver as Mountain Parks vary in degree of development and use. Some familiar parks are well known and regularly visited (Red Rocks Park, Echo Lake, for example); others are remote or small parcels that receive less use (Pence Park, Turkey Creek Park). Most parks have picnic areas and restrooms, but in some cases in this list, "developed" may refer only to accessibility, e.g., Bear Creek Canyon and Deer Creek Canyon. A few park names are duplicated in Jefferson County Open Space parks.

Traditional Developed Parks	Conservation/wilderness Areas
Developed parklands that are central to the system include well known and more modest examples established to provide mountain recreation to City residents. These parks have been used by Denver residents since the 1910s. Today they are equally used by nearby residents, Denver residents, and visitors to or residents of the entire metropolitan area.: Bear Creek Canyon; Bell Park; Bergen Park; Colorow Point Park; Corwina Park; Cub Creek & Dillon Park; Daniels Park; Dedisse Park; Deer Creek Park; Echo Lake Park; Fillius Park; Genesee Park; Katherine Craig Park; Little Park; Lookout Mountain Park; Newton Park; O'Fallon Park; Pence Park; Red Rocks Park (includes Morrison Park); Starbuck Park; Summit Lake Park; Turkey Creek Park	Considerable acreage in the Denver Mountain Parks is devoted to parcels that "were intended never to be developed." Some (marked with asterisks) are adjacent to Jefferson County Open Space parks and may have trail access as a result of cooperative efforts. Many are surrounded by private property and have no public access. These conservation tracts include: Bear Creek Canyon; Bergen Peak*; Berrian Mountain; Birch Hill; Double Header Mountain; Elephant Butte; Fenders; Flying J*; Forsberg; Hicks Mountain; Hobbs Peak; Legault Mountain*; Mount Falcon*; Mount Judge; Mount Lindo; North Turkey Creek; Old Cemetery Ground; Parmalee Gulch; Pence Mountain; Snyder Mountain; Stanley Park; Strain Gulch; West Jefferson School; Yegge Peak
