= Fire Station No. 2 =

Fire Station No. 2, and variations such as Engine House No. 2, may refer to:

in the United States

(by state then city)

- Alpine Hose Company No. 2, Georgetown, Colorado
- Hose House No. 2 (Idaho Springs, Colorado)
- Fire Station No. 2 (Miami, Florida)
- Fire Station No. 2 (Athens, Georgia)
- Fire Station No. 2 (Waterloo, Iowa)
- Fire Station No. 2 (Topeka, Kansas)
- Falls Fire Station No. 2, North Attleborough, Massachusetts, now the Falls Fire Barn Museum
- Fire Department Headquarters; Fire Station No. 2, Kansas City, Missouri
- Fire House No. 2 (Billings, Montana)
- Fire Station No. 2 (Charlotte, North Carolina)
- Fire Station No. 2 (Tacoma, Washington)

== See also ==
- List of fire stations
