= National Register of Historic Places listings in Clear Creek County, Colorado =

Location of Clear Creek County in Colorado

This is a list of the National Register of Historic Places listings in Clear Creek County, Colorado.

This is intended to be a complete list of the properties and districts on the National Register of Historic Places in Clear Creek County, Colorado, United States. The locations of National Register properties and districts for which the latitude and longitude coordinates are included below, may be seen in a map.

There are 25 properties and districts listed on the National Register in the county, including 1 National Historic Landmark.

This National Park Service list is complete through NPS recent listings posted April 3, 2026.

== Current listings ==
	Name on the Register	Image	Date listed	Location	City or town	Description
1	Alpine Hose Company No. 2	Alpine Hose Company No. 2	January 25, 1973 (#73000464)	507 5th St. 39°42′19″N 105°41′48″W	Georgetown	
2	Argo Tunnel and Mill	Argo Tunnel and Mill	January 31, 1978 (#78000836)	2517 Riverside Dr. 39°44′35″N 105°30′17″W	Idaho Springs	
3	Bryan Hose House	Bryan Hose House	March 19, 1998 (#98000174)	Junction of Illinois and Virginia Sts. 39°44′37″N 105°30′46″W	Idaho Springs	
4	Dumont School	Dumont School	March 1, 1996 (#96000201)	150 County Road 260; 39°45′56″N 105°36′13″W	Dumont	
5	Echo Lake Park	Echo Lake Park	February 24, 1995 (#95000109)	Along State Highways 5 and 103 southwest of Idaho Springs; 39°39′33″N 105°36′03″W	Idaho Springs	
6	Anne Evans Mountain Home		January 28, 1992 (#91001530)	Address Restricted	Evergreen	
7	Evans-Elbert Ranch		September 11, 1980 (#80000885)	Upper Bear Creek Rd. 39°39′10″N 105°28′49″W	Idaho Springs	
8	Georgetown Loop Railroad	Georgetown Loop Railroad	December 18, 1970 (#70000909)	Runs between Georgetown and Silver Plume; 39°41′56″N 105°42′42″W	Georgetown and Silver Plume	
9	Georgetown-Silver Plume Historic District	Georgetown-Silver Plume Historic District	November 13, 1966 (#66000243)	Interstate 70; 39°41′55″N 105°42′48″W	Georgetown and Silver Plume	
10	Grace Episcopal Church	Grace Episcopal Church	August 14, 1973 (#73000465)	Taos St. between 4th and 5th Sts. 39°42′19″N 105°41′46″W	Georgetown	
11	Hamill House	Hamill House	May 31, 1972 (#72000267)	Argentine and 3rd Sts. 39°42′17″N 105°41′55″W	Georgetown	
12	Hose House No. 2	Hose House No. 2	March 19, 1998 (#98000173)	600 Colorado Boulevard; 39°44′39″N 105°31′33″W	Idaho Springs	
13	Hotel de Paris	Hotel de Paris	April 28, 1970 (#70000154)	Alpine St. 39°42′20″N 105°41′27″W	Georgetown	
14	Idaho Springs Downtown Commercial District	Idaho Springs Downtown Commercial District	January 5, 1984 (#84000801)	Roughly bounded by Center Alley, 14th Ave., Riverside Dr., and Idaho St. 39°44′32″N 105°30′56″W	Idaho Springs	
15	Lebanon and Everett Mine Tunnels	Lebanon and Everett Mine Tunnels	October 7, 1971 (#71000214)	Northeast of Silver Plume, adjacent to the Interstate 70 right-of-way 39°41′54″N 105°42′47″W	Silver Plume	
16	McClellan House	McClellan House	December 5, 1972 (#72000268)	919 Taos St. 39°41′57″N 105°41′43″W	Georgetown	
17	Methodist Episcopal Church	Methodist Episcopal Church	March 5, 1998 (#98000176)	1440 Colorado Boulevard; 39°44′35″N 105°31′00″W	Idaho Springs	
18	Mill City House	Mill City House	April 30, 2009 (#09000250)	247 County Road 308; 39°45′52″N 105°35′59″W	Dumont	
19	Miner Street Bridge	Miner Street Bridge	February 4, 1985 (#85000193)	Miner St. 39°44′40″N 105°30′45″W	Idaho Springs	
20	Mint Saloon	Mint Saloon	February 3, 1993 (#92001845)	13 E. Park Ave. (U.S. Highway 40); 39°45′40″N 105°40′55″W	Empire	
21	Ore Processing Mill and Dam	Ore Processing Mill and Dam	May 6, 1971 (#71000213)	1 mile southwest of Georgetown off Interstate 70; 39°41′54″N 105°42′44″W	Georgetown	
22	Peck House	Peck House	March 25, 1993 (#93000201)	83 Sunny Ave. 39°45′46″N 105°40′59″W	Empire	
23	Silver Plume Depot	Silver Plume Depot	May 6, 1971 (#71000215)	Off Interstate 70; 39°41′44″N 105°43′24″W	Silver Plume	
24	Summit Lake Park	Summit Lake Park	February 24, 1995 (#95000110)	Mt. Evans Rd., southwest of Idaho Springs; 39°35′55″N 105°38′40″W	Idaho Springs	
25	Toll House	Toll House	December 18, 1970 (#70000155)	Southern side of Georgetown adjacent to Interstate 70; 39°42′15″N 105°42′12″W	Georgetown	Gothic Revival house from before 1878 which sat beside gates of private toll road between silver mines.

== See also ==
- List of National Historic Landmarks in Colorado
- List of National Register of Historic Places in Colorado
- Bibliography of Colorado
- Geography of Colorado
- History of Colorado
- Index of Colorado-related articles
- List of Colorado-related lists
- Outline of Colorado
