= Hose House No. 2 =

Hose House No. 2 may refer to:

- Hose House No. 2 (Idaho Springs, Colorado), listed on the NRHP in Clear Creek County, Colorado
- Alpine Hose Company No. 2, in Georgetown, Colorado, listed on the NRHP in Clear Creek County, Colorado
- Hose House No. 2 (Beverly, Massachusetts), also NRHP-listed
