= Hotel de Paris (Georgetown, Colorado) =

- U.S. National Register of Historic Places
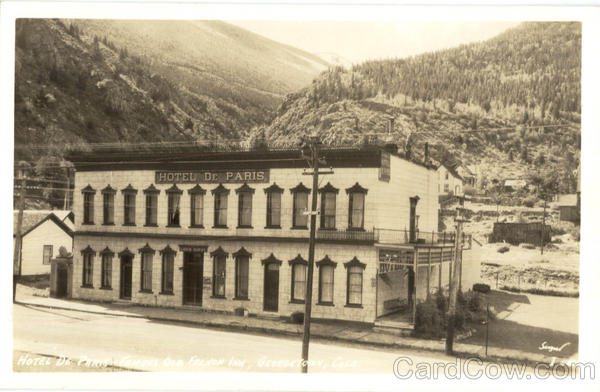
- Hotel De Paris Georgetown

- Location within Colorado Location within the United States
- Location: 409 6th St., Georgetown, Colorado
- Coordinates: 39.70586°N 105.6958°W
- Area: 9.9 acres (4.0 ha)
- Built: 1889
- NRHP reference No.: 70000154
- Added to NRHP: April 28, 1970

The Hotel de Paris is an historic hotel and museum located in the town of Georgetown, Colorado. The building stands on 6th Street, across from Georgetown Town Hall, in the eastern end of the town. Originally opened in 1875 by French immigrant Louis Dupuy, the hotel became famous for its luxury and the high-class French cuisine offered to visitors, at the height of the Colorado Silver Boom in Georgetown and the Mountain West. The museum is a popular tourist attraction, known for its well-preserved interiors containing over 5,000 items from the Victorian era, 90% of which are original to the Dupuy era. It was purchased in 1954 by the Colorado chapter of the National Society of the Colonial Dames of America, which have operated it as a museum ever since.

== Louis Dupuy ==
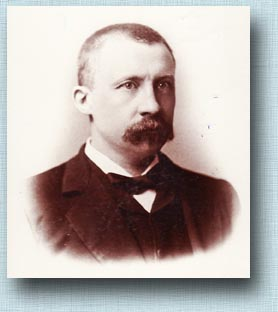
Image of Louis Dupuy (1844-1900)

The hotel was the creation of Louis Dupuy (né Adolphe François Gerard), a French immigrant from Alençon born in 1844. As a young man he entered a seminary to study for the priesthood, but left after a short time to enroll in culinary school. Gerard immigrated to the United States in 1866 and briefly worked in New York City as a writer, until he was caught plagiarizing a piece of writing which he sold to the Illustrated Newspaper as his own. He thereafter joined the US Army, which sent him West to Cheyenne, Wyoming to work as a desk clerk. For unknown reasons, he deserted soon after, changing his name to Louis Dupuy and walking on foot to Denver, Colorado, where he found work with the Rocky Mountain News as a mining reporter beginning in 1868. Dupuy's work brought him to Georgetown, then a booming mining town, and he soon became a miner himself, which ended in disaster when he was injured in an explosion at a mine near Silver Plume in 1873. Soon after, the community in Georgetown raised money which enabled him to rent the Delmonico Bakery in the Powers Building, plus two smaller adjacent structures, which he transformed into the Hotel de Paris.

== History ==
The Hotel de Paris opened on October 9, 1875. The establishment was modelled after a French inn in Dupuy's native Alençon, and charged an exorbitant $4.00 per night to guests. The arrival of the Colorado Central Railroad in 1877 provided a further stimulus to Georgetown's growth and Dupuy's business. By 1881 he was able to purchase an additional 1/2 lot to the west, on which he built an extension with four further hotel rooms and an outhouse with laundry facility. Dupuy ensured that the hotel was fitted with the very latest conveniences, including gaslight (replaced in 1893 with electric lighting), radiant heating, and washbasins in every room equipped with hot and cold running water. Dupuy acted as chef in addition to hotelier, using his familiarity with French cuisine to offer unusually refined fare to hotel guests. A wine cellar supplied fine wines, champagne, spirits and liqueurs.

Dupuy made several major additions to the hotel in 1878, 1882, and 1889, which transformed it into the 7,000 square foot building seen today. With the final addition, Dupuy had a stucco covering applied to the façade painted to appear like ashlar masonry, to give the hotel a more uniform appearance. A commercial kitchen was built and the restaurant enlarged, becoming the piéce de résistance of the hotel. The dining room featured silver maple and black walnut floors and a dining service of Haviland China imported from Limoges, France. Dupuy, who spoke four languages, furnished his study with over 2,500 volumes written in French, English, German, and Latin, which could be loaned to guests. These are all preserved in the existing museum. Dupuy capitalized on a clientele of travelling salesmen passing through Georgetown by creating three galleries in the hotel for the salesmen to exhibit their wares to locals.

Some of the more notable guests of the Hotel de Paris included the railroad speculator Jay Gould, photographer William Henry Jackson and English explorer Isabella Bird.

The hotel reached the peak of its success in the early 1890s, but the Panic of 1893 caused a permanent drop in the value of silver, from which Georgetown's mining-dependent economy never recovered. The hotel received minor damage in January 1892, when the McClellan Opera House two buildings down from the hotel caught fire, destroying the opera house and the millinery shop separating it from the Hotel de Paris. In October 1900 Louis Dupuy died after a weeks-long battle with pneumonia, and the hotel passed into the ownership of Dupuy's housekeeper, Sophie Gally, who herself died not long after. In 1903 Sarah Burkholder purchased the hotel and at some point turned it into a boarding house, which she co-managed with her daughter Hazel McAdams. The Georgetown Courier called the hotel of the immediate post-Dupuy era "famous the world over" for the continued excellence of its cuisine and the comfort of its appointments. The hotel remained in the ownership of the Burkholder family until 1954, when after years of declining business the family sold it to the Colonial Dames of America.

== Museum ==
The museum opened in 1954, and offers guided tours in multiple languages. In 1970 the building was placed on the National Register of Historic Places, and in 2007 it was named a site of the National Trust for Historic Preservation. On the 60th anniversary of the museum's opening in 2014, Colorado Governor John Hickenlooper declared May 24 "Hotel de Paris Day" in Colorado.

== In popular culture ==
- In 1959, a CBS television series called Hotel de Paree, inspired by the august Colorado hotel, premiered. Set in the wild west, it starred Earl Holliman and aired between October 1959 and June 1960.
- The 1998 movie Phantoms, starring Rose McGowan, Joanna Going, and Ben Affleck, featured several scenes filmed at the hotel, which stood in as a bakery and hotel for the fictional town of "Snowfield".
