= Toll House (Georgetown, Colorado) =

- U.S. National Register of Historic Places
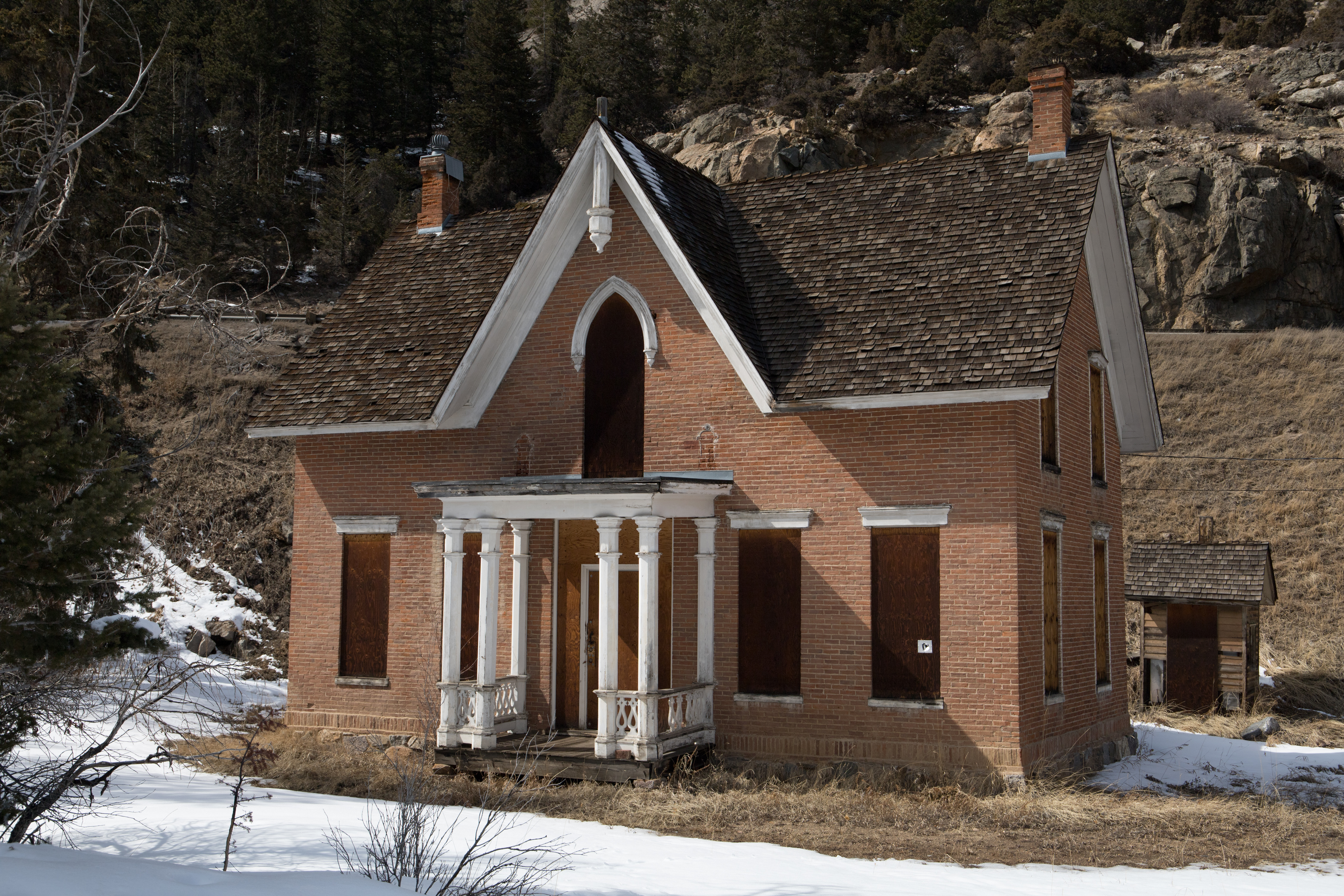

- Location within Colorado
- Location: South side of Georgetown adjacent to the I-70, Georgetown, Colorado
- Coordinates: 39.704178°N 105.703468°W
- Area: 0.5 acres (0.20 ha)
- Built: before 1878
- Architectural style: Gothic Revival, Early Gothic Revival
- NRHP reference No.: 70000155
- Added to NRHP: December 18, 1970

The Toll House is a residence in Clear Creek County, Colorado. It was built by 1878 near the toll gates of a private road linking mines between the towns of Silver Plume, Colorado and Georgetown, Colorado. The home belonged to Julius G. Pohle, an officer of the Lebanon Mining Company; the Lebanon Mine was one of the earliest hard rock silver mines in Colorado, operating from around 1870 until the 1940s. It was listed on the National Register of Historic Places in 1970.

The home is located on the southern side of Georgetown, Colorado adjacent to (and below) Interstate 70. It appears to be viewable from an overlook off the northbound I-70. It would be accessed by what is now known as Loop Road or as the Silver Plume to Georgetown Express.

It is described as a wood-frame house, but has particularly sturdy construction using 10 by 10 inches (25 cm × 25 cm) beams and 4 by 4 inches (10 cm × 10 cm) upright posts. It has a brick veneer exterior. It can be and apparently has been moved.

It is Gothic Revival in style.
