= Phantoms (film) =

1998 film directed by Joe Chappelle

- Theatrical release poster
- Directed by: Joe Chappelle
- Screenplay by: Dean Koontz
- Based on: Phantoms by Dean Koontz
- Produced by: Joel Soisson; Michael Leahy; Robert Pringle; Steven Lane
- Starring: Peter O'Toole; Rose McGowan; Joanna Going; Liev Schreiber; Ben Affleck; Nicky Katt; Clifton Powell; Michael DeLorenzo
- Cinematography: Richard Clabaugh
- Edited by: Randolph Bricker
- Music by: David C. Williams
- Production company: Dimension Films
- Distributed by: Dimension Films
- Release date: January 23, 1998
- Running time: 96 minutes
- Country: United States
- Language: English
- Budget: $12–16 million
- Box office: $5.8 million

Phantoms is a 1998 American science fiction horror film directed by Joe Chappelle and starring Peter O'Toole, Rose McGowan, Joanna Going, Liev Schreiber, Ben Affleck, Nicky Katt, and Clifton Powell. The screenplay was adapted by Dean Koontz from his own 1983 novel of the same name. The film takes place in the peaceful town of Snowfield, Colorado, where something evil has wiped out the community. It is up to a group of people to stop it or at least get out of Snowfield alive. While Koontz's novel included many literary references to the work of H. P. Lovecraft, these are largely absent from the film.

== Plot ==
Dr. Jennifer "Jenny" Pailey brings her sister Lisa to Snowfield, Colorado, a small ski resort village nestled in the Rocky Mountains where Jenny works. There, the sisters find no one around but some corpses. They then stumble upon the severed heads of the town baker and his wife in an oven before being found by Sheriff Bryce Hammond, a former FBI agent, and his deputies Stu Wargle and Steve Shanning. Hammond and his deputies are investigating the killings.

The group arrives at a nearby hotel and find the writing of a victim on the mirror reading "Timothy Flyte". Shanning leaves to investigate a sound outside but does not return. The others find only his gun, hat and shoes while the rest of him is gone. At the sheriff's office, they request aid and create roadblocks around Snowfield. The group gets a phone call but are interrupted by an attack by a moth-like creature that rips Wargle's face off before Hammond kills it. Lisa later encounters Wargle while in the bathroom. They return to the morgue and find his body missing.

Hammond's FBI associates find Flyte, a British academic who theorizes that the town has fallen victim to the Ancient Enemy, an entity he generalizes as "chaos in the flesh". It periodically wipes out civilizations including that of the Mayans and the Roanoke Island colonists.

They are joined by an Army commando unit and a group of scientists led by General Copperfield who has come to Snowfield. They, along with Flyte, investigate the town. The creature kills soldiers investigating the sewers, while a dog approaches Flyte and the scientists and transforms into a monster that converts the group, except for Flyte. Flyte regroups with Hammond, Jenny, Lisa, and Copperfield. The creature attacks Copperfield through a manhole, converting him. Copperfield vomits a sample before melting into a puddle of liquid. Through it, Flyte and the group learn the nature of the Enemy.

The Enemy is an Earth-based amoebic life form that mimics its absorbed victims while gaining their knowledge. The creature creates Phantoms as temporary detachments for it to act through before absorbing them back into it. Furthermore, the Enemy absorbs all of the thoughts of its victims, making it intelligent, and because of the previous civilizations' perception of it, it believes itself to be a god. It had arranged all of the prior events so Flyte can assist the creature in revealing its existence to the world. The creature's body is physiologically almost identical to crude oil, and could be killed by bacteria bio-engineered to ingest fossil fuels. With the limited amount of the bacteria they have, they need to get it into the nucleus that is within the Enemy's main body.

They form a plan to use the Enemy's arrogance and god complex against itself. To do so, Flyte acts as if he is turning against the group by revealing their entire plan to the Enemy. In anger (and believing itself indestructible), it reabsorbs all the Phantoms and emerges from the sewers to assume a Mother Mass form. Hammond and the Pailey sisters fire the bacteria into the Enemy before it retreats underground with Hammond in pursuit.

While the sisters find themselves dealing with Wargle's Phantom, Jenny seemingly kills it with a gun containing the bacteria. Hammond finds the Enemy as it has assumed the form of the boy he accidentally killed during an FBI drug raid. When the boy grabs the last vial from him, Hammond shoots at it to expose the creature to its contents. It dies from the bacteria.

Though Hammond reassures Lisa and Jenny that it is gone, with the former stating the townsfolk are at peace, Flyte admits that the Enemy did achieve its victory as he has decided to tell the world what happened with a book based on what occurred in Snowfield. Later, watching Flyte being interviewed about his book, The Ancient Enemy, two bar patrons argue about the existence of alien life. Hearing laughter nearby, the patrons turn to see Wargle, who asks if they want to see something interesting.

== Cast ==
- Peter O'Toole as Timothy Flyte
- Rose McGowan as Lisa Pailey
- Joanna Going as Jenny Pailey
- Liev Schreiber as Deputy Stu Wargle
- Ben Affleck as Sheriff Bryce Hammond
- Nicky Katt as Deputy Steve Shanning
- Clifton Powell as General Copperfield
- Rachel Shane as Yamaguchi, Scientist
- Michael DeLorenzo as Velazquez, Soldier
- Bo Hopkins as FBI Agent Hawthorne
- Rob Knepper as FBI Agent Wilson

== Production ==
The rights to Koontz' book were initially purchased by producer Steven Lane, a producer on The Howling series. Producer Joel Soisson, after reading the book, spent the next ten years pursuing the rights and was instrumental in getting the film set up at Miramax Films. It would be handled by Miramax Films' horror-focused label Dimension Films, who produced it in conjunction with Japanese company Fuji Creative. Due to Fuji's involvement, the film's country of origin is sometimes listed as being both the United States and Japan.

Phantoms was filmed on location in Georgetown, Colorado in late 1996, with over five sets of reshoots later happening in 1997. The Hotel de Paris Museum was used to depict the bakery and hotel where several scenes were set. While the film was in post-production during the first half of 1997, actress Joanna Going flew to New Zealand for three months to shoot another Miramax film titled Heaven. Post-production on Phantoms was originally intended to wrap around mid-1997, and Dimension/Miramax announced a release date of October 24, 1997, in time for Halloween. However, it was delayed to January 1998. The film still has a 1998 copyright date in the credits, as there were further post-production changes done shortly before the film's release. Actor Ben Affleck had cosmetic work done on his teeth for the film Armageddon, which was shot in late 1997, and in reshoots for Phantoms, his teeth appear noticeably whiter than in scenes that were shot earlier.

In 2017, Rose McGowan claimed that she was sexually assaulted by Miramax boss Harvey Weinstein while attending the Sundance Film Festival in January 1997. She was at the festival promoting Going All the Way, a non-Miramax film which also starred both McGowan and Affleck. McGowan further claimed that shortly after the assault, she did a photoshoot for Phantoms, where she revealed to Affleck what had happened to her, with Affleck allegedly responding by saying that he'd already told Weinstein to stop engaging in this behaviour. Affleck did not publicly respond to this allegation McGowan made about him. In early 2018, Weinstein's lawyer Ben Brafman released an email which he claimed disproved this allegation, and the matter never made it to court.

== Release ==
=== Box office ===
Phantoms was released theatrically in the United States on January 23, 1998, in 1,859 theaters. The film earned $3,065,951 during its opening weekend, and went on to gross a total of $5,755,333.

== Home media ==
Buena Vista Home Entertainment released Phantoms on VHS on August 19, 1998, and on DVD in 1999; the DVD was reissued in 2001.

On May 1, 2012, Echo Bridge released the film on Blu-ray. Paramount later made Phantoms available on their subscription streaming service Paramount+, as well as on their free streaming service Pluto TV. Paramount also sublicensed home video rights to Scream Factory, who released the film in a collector's edition dual-format 4K UHD and Blu-ray set on July 16, 2024. The 4K scan of the film from the original camera negative was approved by director Joe Chappelle.

== Reception ==
=== Critical response and legacy ===
On the review aggregator website Rotten Tomatoes, 9% of 32 critics' reviews are positive, with an average rating of 4.2/10. Metacritic, which uses a weighted average, assigned the film a score of 26 out of 100, based on 19 critics, indicating "generally unfavorable" reviews.

Roger Ebert gave the film 1 star out of 4, saying: "If only we could learn to think more kindly of those who digest us, this movie could have ended happily". Godfrey Cheshire of Variety gave the film a favorable review, writing that it is "perhaps most enthralling in its early sections, when the enemy is still unspecified and the horror thus remains purely psychological. After the Army arrives and the visual maelstrom is unleashed, there are moments when it’s hard to keep track of the characters or to tell exactly what the sound and fury are meant to signify. Still, the film rights itself in time to deliver a satisfying ending."

Phantoms was referenced in the 2001 film Jay and Silent Bob Strike Back, which was released by Dimension/Miramax and had Ben Affleck in a small role. The film included several other meta-references to Miramax and the film industry.

== See also ==
- The Stuff
- X the Unknown
- The X-Files
