= Georgetown–Silver Plume Historic District =

Historic district in Colorado, United States

- Georgetown–Silver Plume National Historic Landmark District
- U.S. National Register of Historic Places
- U.S. National Historic Landmark District
- Colorado State Register of Historic Properties
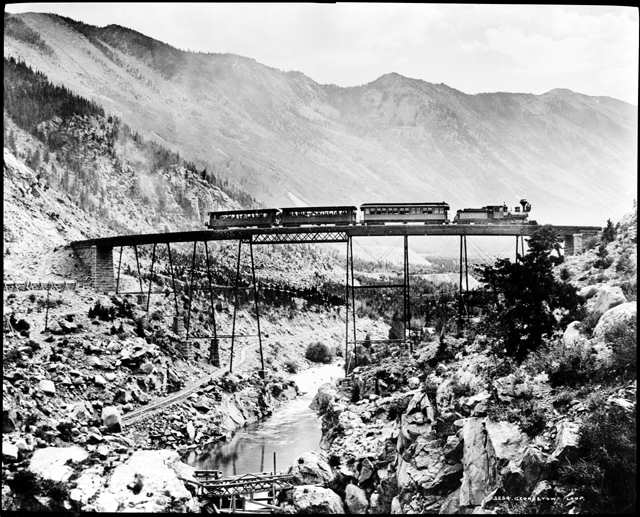
- The Georgetown Loop high bridge as seen c. 1885.

- Location within Colorado Location within the United States
- Nearest city: Georgetown, Colorado and Silver Plume, Colorado
- Coordinates: 39°41′55″N 105°42′48″W
- Area: 3,288 acres (1,331 ha)
- Built: 1859
- Architectural style: Late Victorian
- NRHP reference No.: 66000243
- CSRHP No.: 5CC.3

Significant dates
- Added to NRHP: November 13, 1966
- Designated NHLD: November 13, 1966

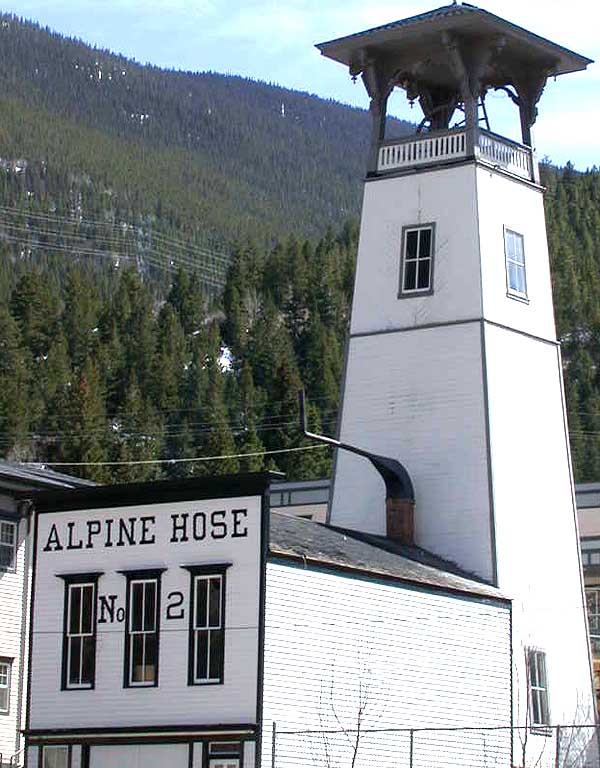
The historic Alpine Hose Firehouse No. 2 in Georgetown.

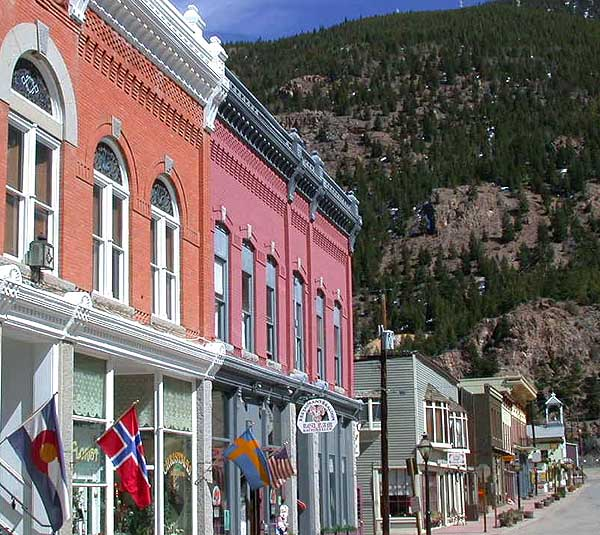
View west along Sixth Street in downtown Georgetown.

The Georgetown–Silver Plume National Historic Landmark District is a federally designated United States National Historic Landmark that comprises the Town of Georgetown, the Town of Silver Plume, and the Georgetown Loop Historic Mining & Railroad Park between the two silver mining towns along Clear Creek in the Front Range of the Rocky Mountains in Clear Creek County, Colorado, United States.

The district includes well-preserved examples of the buildings and mining structures of the Colorado Silver Boom from 1864 to 1893. The Georgetown Loop Historic Mining & Railroad Park includes the reconstructed Georgetown Loop, an example of 19th-century 3 ft (914 mm) narrow gauge railway engineering required to negotiate the 601 feet (183 meters) of elevation rise in the mere 2.0 miles (3.2 kilometers) between the two towns. Historic steam locomotives pull passenger trains over the loop from late May through early October. Guided tours of the Lebanon Silver Mine are also available.

The district was designated a National Historic Landmark on November 13, 1966.

== History ==
Gold was discovered in Georgetown by George and David Griffiths in 1859, and Georgetown eventually took its name from the former. The gold finds in the area were relatively minor, but a major lode of silver was discovered in 1864, kicking off the local boom. Georgetown became a center for thousands of miners operating in the surrounding hills. Silver Plume was developed as one of a series of satellite camps, and in 1884 the Georgetown Loop Railroad was built, connecting the two by rail. Mining declined in the 1890s, and the area has since had a relatively low population.

== See also ==
- National Register of Historic Places listings in Clear Creek County, Colorado
