= Adolphe Gérard =

French chef, restaurant and hotel owner

- Born: 13 October 1844; Alençon
- Died: October 7, 1900 (aged 55); Georgetown
- Occupations: Chef, Restaurant and Hotel owner

Adolphe Gérard (1844–1900) was a French chef, restaurant and hotel owner in Colorado, US.

Gérard was born in Alençon, France, in 1844. At age 15, he enrolled in a seminary in the commune of Sées. At age 20, Gérard moved to Paris, where he was apprenticed as a chef in a hotel. He then moved to London, where he worked with a newspaper on its reviews and translations (Gérard was fluent in English, German and Latin).

At age 22, Gérard moved to New York City, where he again worked for a newspaper. In 1868, he enlisted in the U.S. Army at Fort Hamilton, New York, and was assigned to Fort D. A. Russell near Cheyenne, Wyoming. In April 1869, he deserted and moved to Denver, Colorado, assuming the name "Louis Dupuy". He started working for the Rocky Mountain News as a roving reporter for the mining camps.

Gérard soon decided to become a miner himself. In 1873, while working in the Cold Stream Mine on Mount Sherman in Silver Plume, Colorado, he was badly injured in a delayed dynamite explosion in the Kennedy Tunnel. Gérard took the brunt of the blast and saved the life of a fellow miner. Gérard broke a rib and clavicle, and injured his left eye. Because he could not return to mining, the people of Georgetown, Colorado, raised enough money for him to rent the former Delmonico Bakery. He was able to purchase the property within a few years and created a successful restaurant and hotel that he called Hotel de Paris.

By the early 1890s, the original building had tripled in size. It contained numerous rooms, a formal dining room, a sizeable kitchen and an apartment for Gérard. The Hotel de Paris had indoor plumbing with a washbasin in each room, as well as electric lighting which replaced gas lighting in 1893. Dinners were served on Haviland & Co. china from Limoges, France, with elegant linens and imported glassware. The menu included steaks from cattle raised on Louis' ranch Troublesome Creek, delicacies such as oysters and anchovies in olive oil imported from France.

Gérard was an avid reader of literature and philosophy. His library contained a full set of Encyclopædia Britannica.

On October 7, 1900, Gérard died from pneumonia at age 56. He left the hotel to his housekeeper Sophie Gally, who died only four months later. In 1904, the Hotel de Paris was purchased by James H. and Sarah Burkholder. Their daughter, Hazel Burkholder McAdams, owned the hotel until 1954, when the National Society of The Colonial Dames of America in the State of Colorado acquired it and turned it into a museum.

Gérard is buried with Sophie Gally. They share a grave marker inscribed with the words "Deux Bons Amis" ("Two good friends").

In 1985, Gérard was fictionalized by Louis L'Amour in his novel The Proving Trail.
