= Bryan Hose House =

- U.S. National Register of Historic Places
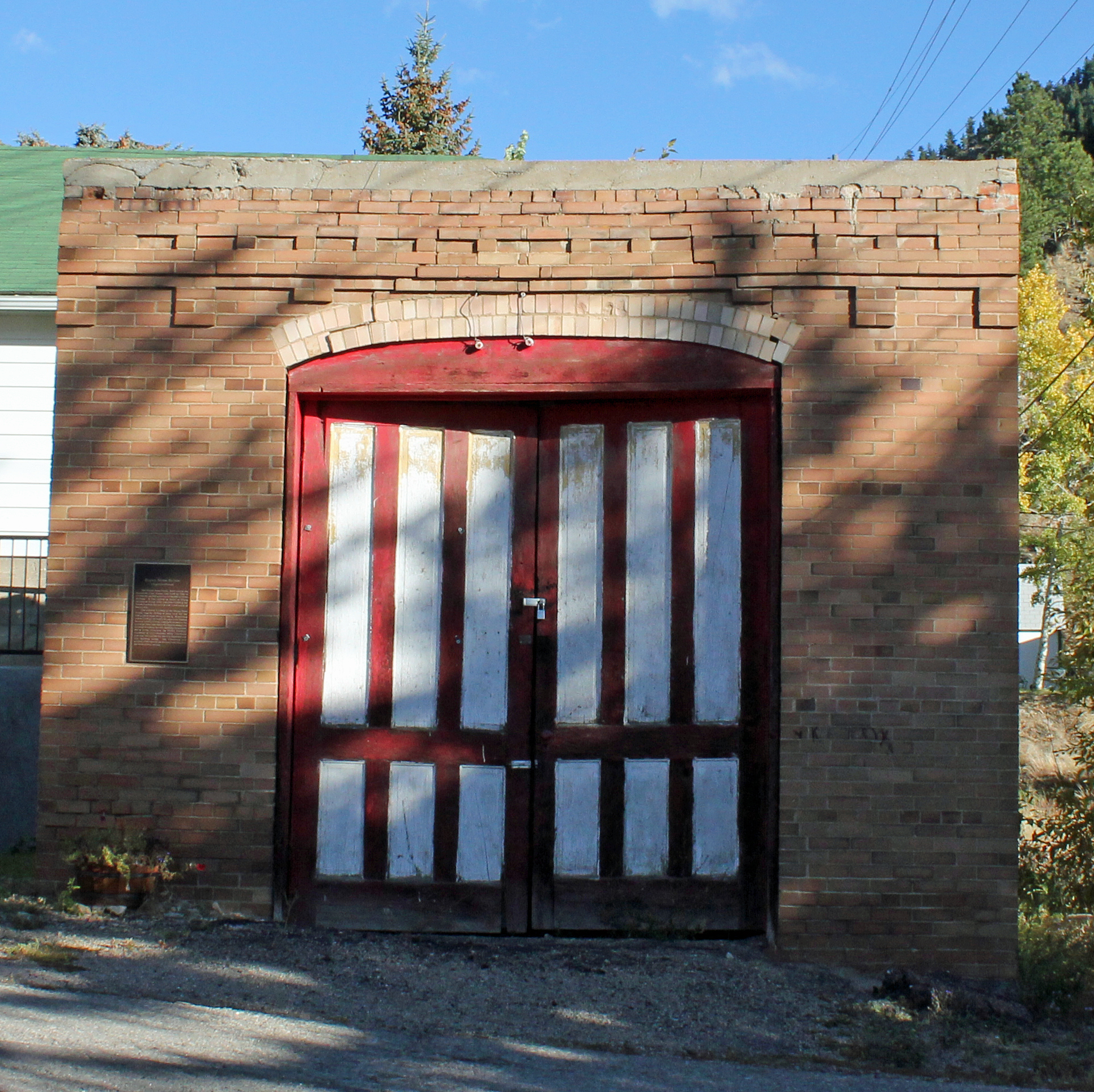

- Location within Colorado
- Location: Jct. of Illinois and Virginia Sts., Idaho Springs, Colorado
- Coordinates: 39°44′37″N 105°30′46″W
- Area: less than one acre
- Built: 1881
- Architectural style: Late Victorian
- NRHP reference No.: 98000174
- Added to NRHP: March 19, 1998

The Bryan Hose House, in Idaho Springs, Colorado, was built in 1881. It was listed on the National Register of Historic Places in 1998.

It has also been known as the Sunnyside Hose House and as Hose Company No. 2. It is located at the junction of Illinois and Virginia Streets in Idaho Springs.

== See also ==
- Hose House No. 2 (Idaho Springs, Colorado)
- National Register of Historic Places listings in Clear Creek County, Colorado
