= Clear Creek (Colorado) =

Stream in Colorado, United States

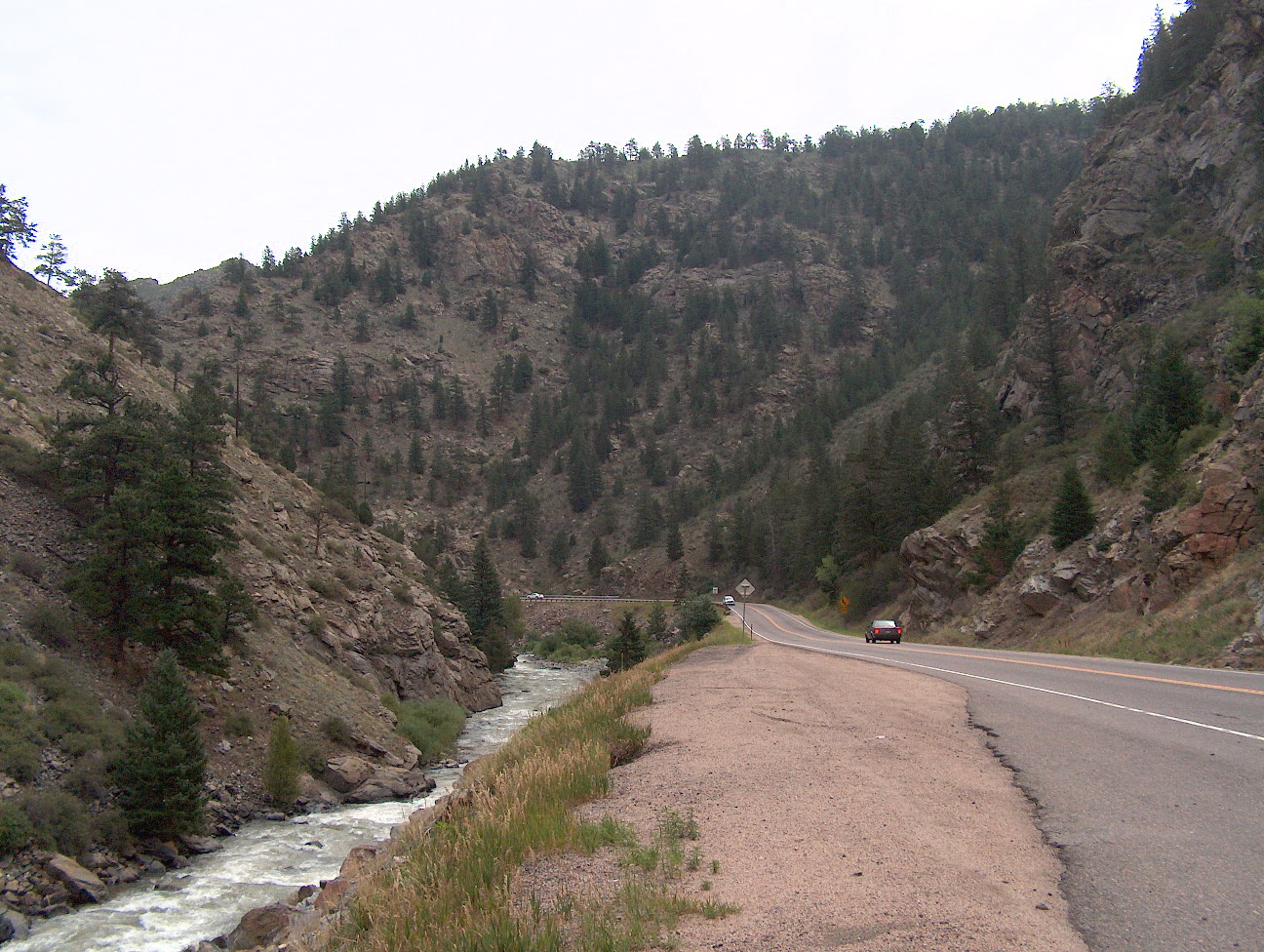
- US 6 in Clear Creek Canyon west of Golden

Physical characteristics
- Source
  - location: Clear Creek County, Colorado
  - coordinates: 39°40′29″N 105°55′23″W
- Mouth
  - location: Confluence with South Platte
  - coordinates: 39°49′39″N 104°56′57″W
  - elevation: 5,092 ft (1,552 m)
- Length: 66 mi (106 km)
- Discharge
  - location: Golden, Colorado
  - average: 191 cu/ft. per sec.

Basin features
- Progression: South Platte—Platte— Missouri—Mississippi

Clear Creek is a tributary of the South Platte River, approximately 66 miles (106 km) long, in north central Colorado in the United States. The creek flows through Clear Creek Canyon in the Rocky Mountains directly west of Denver, descending through a long gorge to emerge at the town of Golden, finally ending in the Colorado Eastern Plains where it joins the South Platte. Clear Creek is unusual in that it is a stream named "creek" fed by a stream named "river"; typically "rivers" are fed by "creeks", and are larger bodies of water, although the nomenclature is ambiguous and there is no clear system. Fall River empties into Clear Creek along I-70 west of Idaho Springs, Colorado.

== Colorado gold rush ==
The creek is famous as the location of the most intense early mining activity during the Colorado Gold Rush of 1859. The creek provided the route of the Colorado Central Railroad, and later for U.S. Highway 6 and Interstate 70 as they ascend to the Continental Divide west of Denver.

== Geography ==
The creek rises at the continental divide near Loveland Pass in the Front Range, northwest of Grays Peak in western Clear Creek County. It descends eastward through Clear Creek Canyon past the towns of Silver Plume, Georgetown, and Idaho Springs, all of which were founded as mining camps in the 1859 gold rush. Within the canyon it receives numerous smaller tributary creeks that descend from the rugged mountains on either side.

At the mouth of the canyon, the creek passes through the town of Golden, past the Coors brewery which is MolsonCoors Beverage Company but used to be MillerCoors owned by MolsonCoors. East of the foothills, it flows through the northwest part of the Denver Metropolitan Area, passing through north Lakewood and Wheat Ridge, then roughly along the route of Interstate 76. Along this section it is largely an ignored urban stream, with an undeveloped floodplain. Part of the creek path forms a wooded park with bicycle/foot path. It passes under Interstate 25 between its junction with Interstate 70 and U.S. Highway 36 (the Boulder Turnpike). It joins the South Platte from the west in southeast Thornton, near the junction of Interstate 76 and State Highway 224.

== History ==
Clear Creek was originally named Cannonball Creek as early as 1820, called so by the French hunters of the expedition of Stephen Harriman Long, after the river rocks in its bed. In the 1830s it became known as Vasquez Fork, also Vasquez River, after the fur trader Louis Vasquez, who had his fort at the mouth of the river and trapped along it. It gained its present name from the gold rushers in 1859.

== Gallery ==
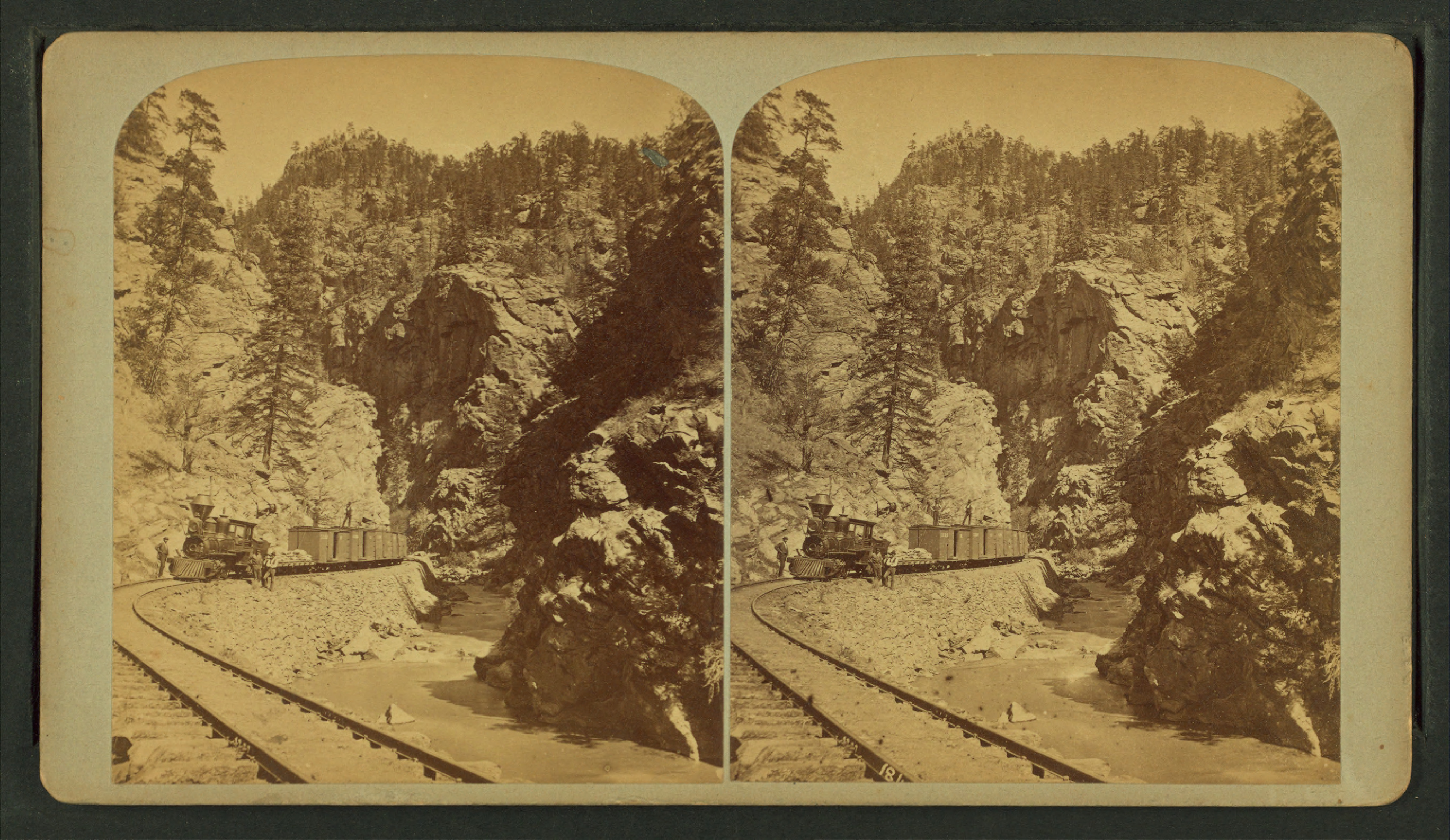
Stereoscopic view of silver ore train in Clear Creek Canyon, circa 1868

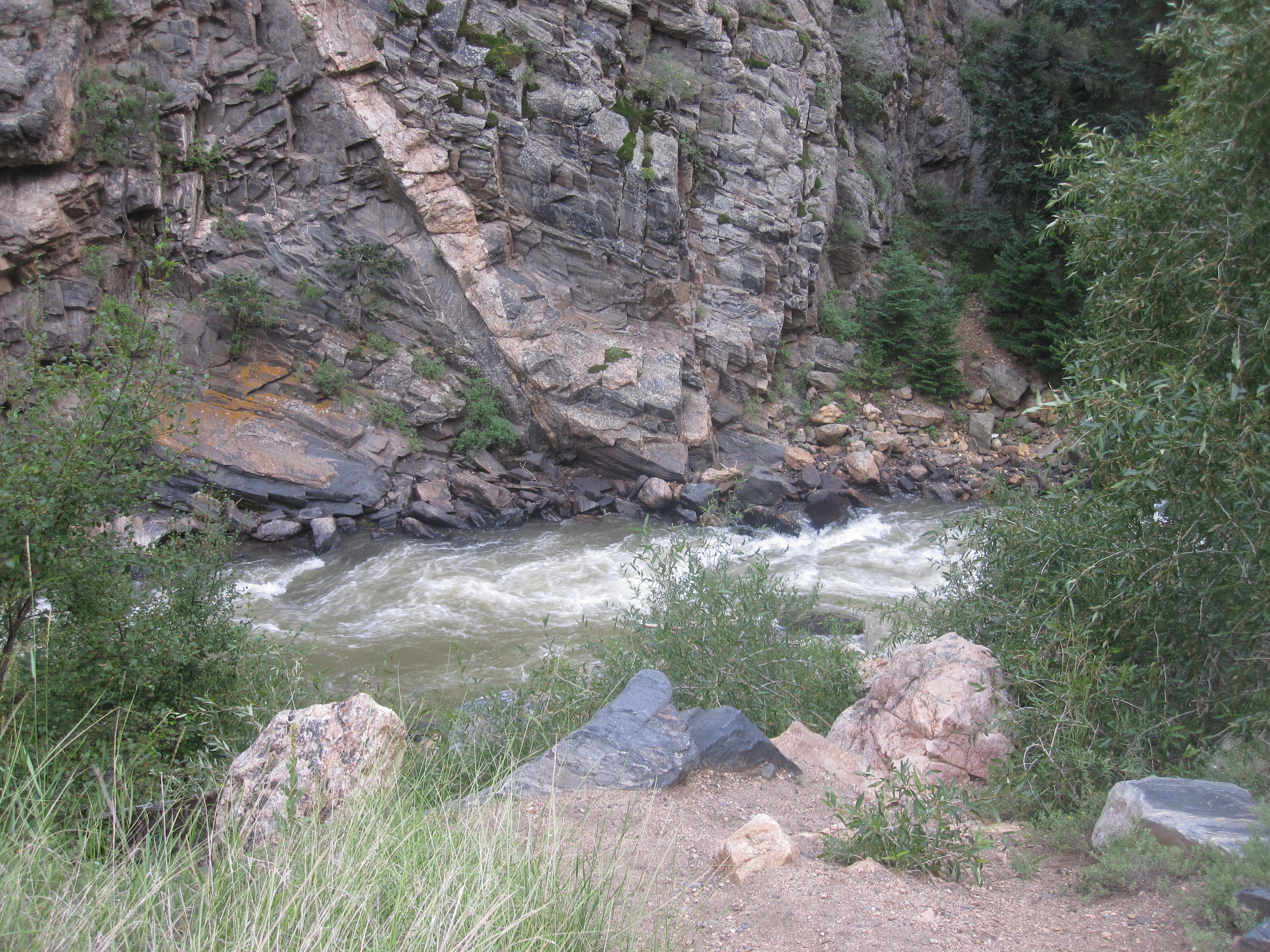
Clear Creek west of Golden

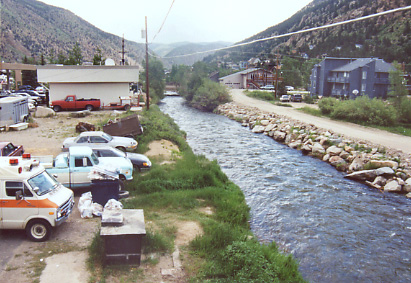
Clear Creek at Georgetown, 2003

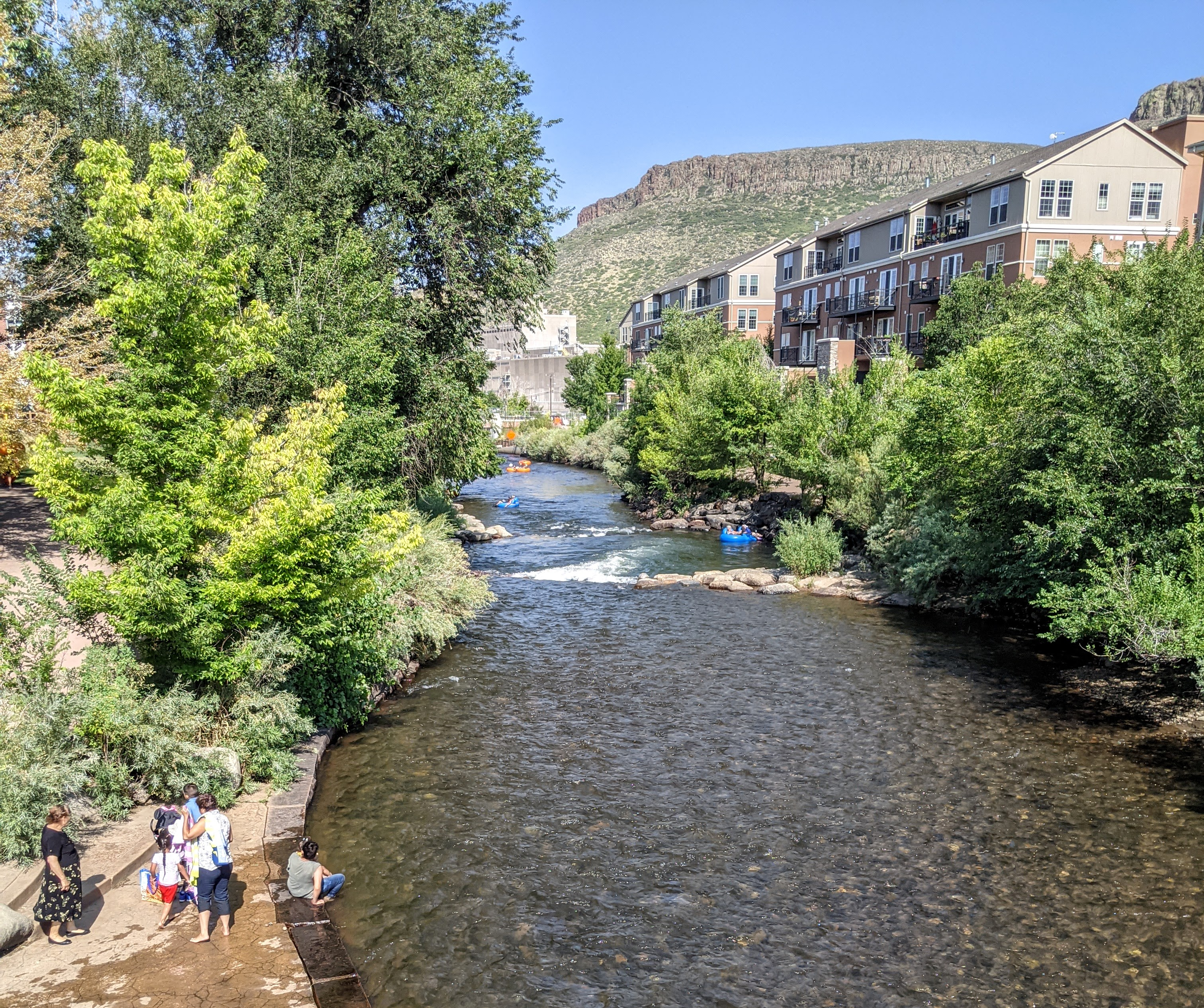
Looking east from the Washington Avenue bridge in Golden

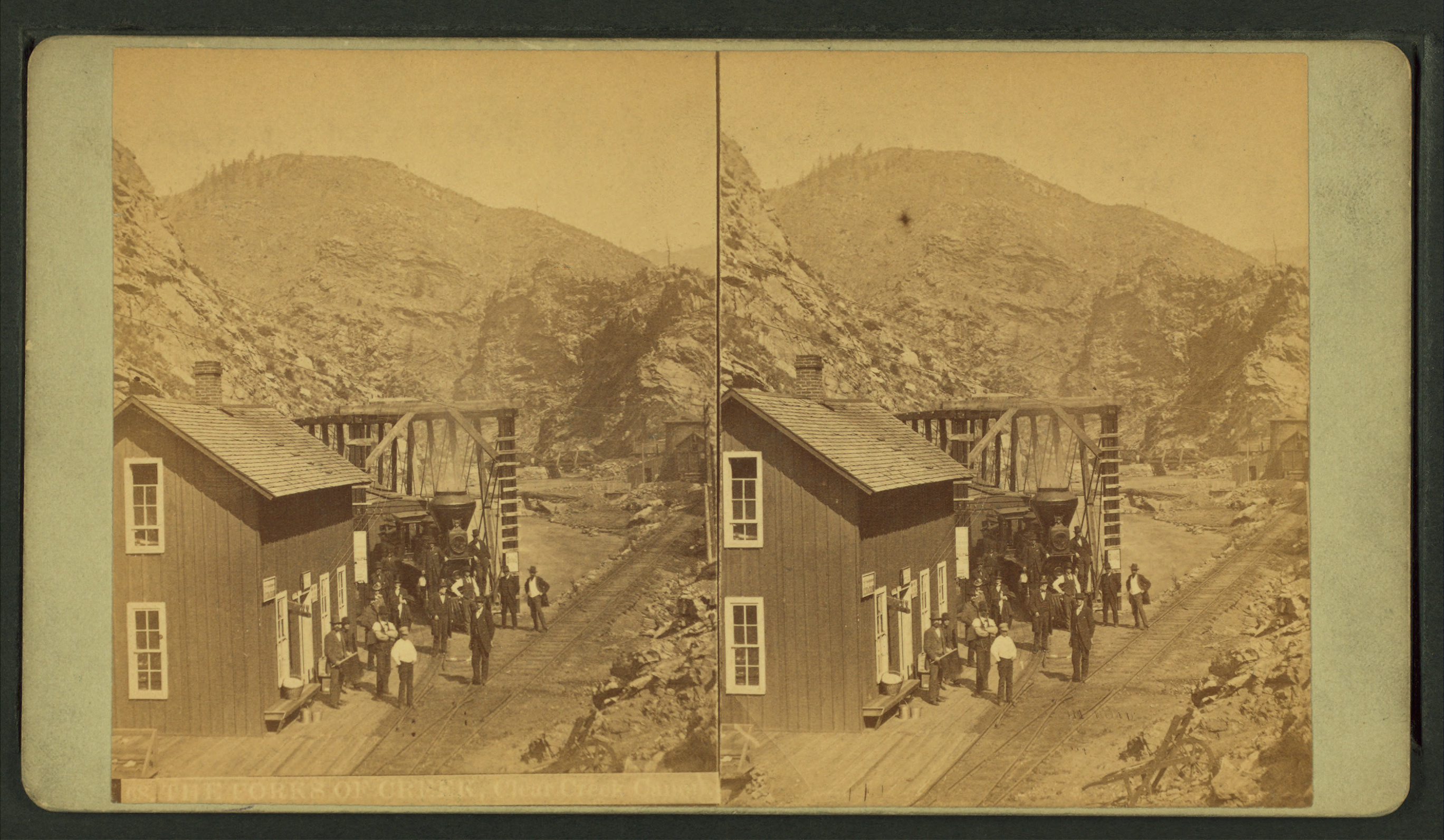
Stereoscopic of Colorado Central Railroad in Clear Creek Canyon, circa 1868

== See also ==
- List of rivers of Colorado
- Crabtree Creek (South Santiam River), another creek with a river tributary
