= Idaho Springs Downtown Commercial District =

Historic district in Colorado, United States

- U.S. National Register of Historic Places
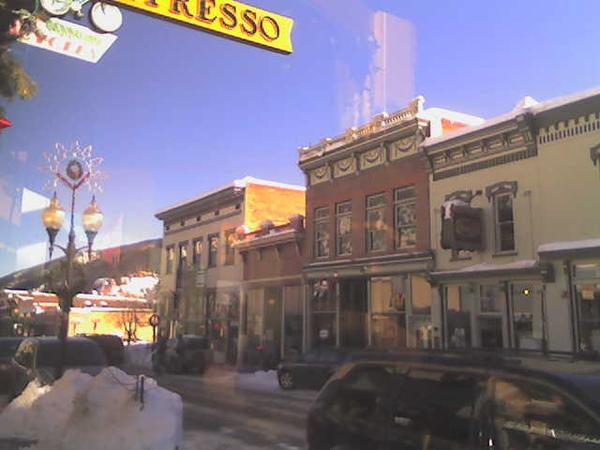
- View of Idaho Springs in 2006

- Location within Colorado
- Location: Roughly bounded by Center Alley, 14th Ave., Riverside Dr., and Idaho St., Idaho Springs, Colorado
- Coordinates: 39°44′32″N 105°30′56″W
- Area: 9 acres (3.6 ha)
- Built: 1877
- Architectural style: Early Commercial
- NRHP reference No.: 84000801
- Added to NRHP: January 5, 1984

The Idaho Springs Downtown Commercial District includes Early Commercial architecture in Idaho Springs, Colorado. The historic district was listed on the National Register of Historic Places in 1984. The listing includes 46 contributing buildings on 9 acres (3.6 ha).

The district is roughly bounded by Center Alley, 14th Ave., Riverside Dr., and Idaho St. in Idaho Springs. It is less than .5 miles (0.80 km) from where George A. Jackson discovered gold in Chicago Creek on January 7, 1859, setting off a gold rush which brought people to Denver and Colorado.

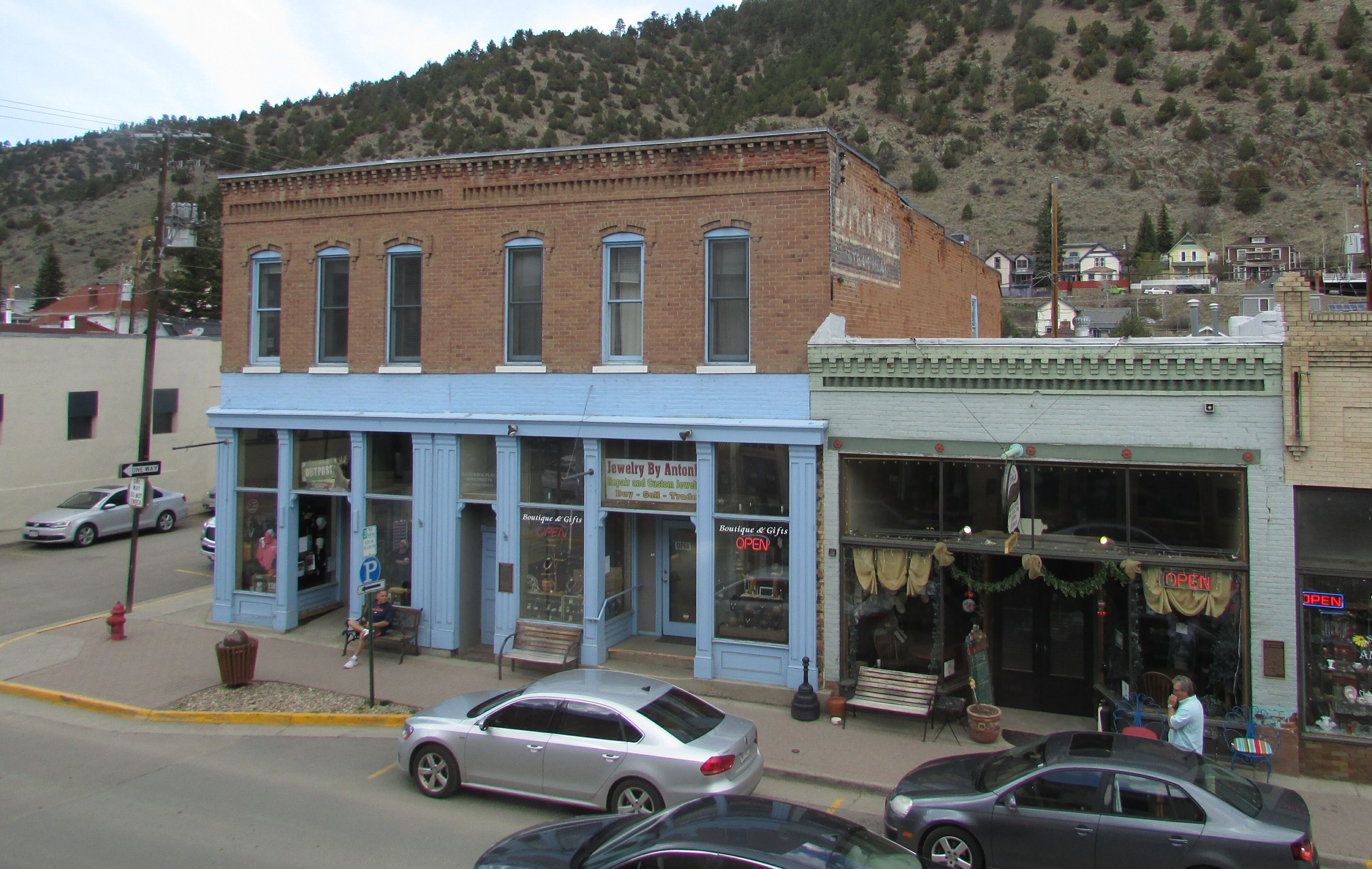
Brunswick Flats or the Pharmacy Bldg is located in the Idaho Springs Commercial District.

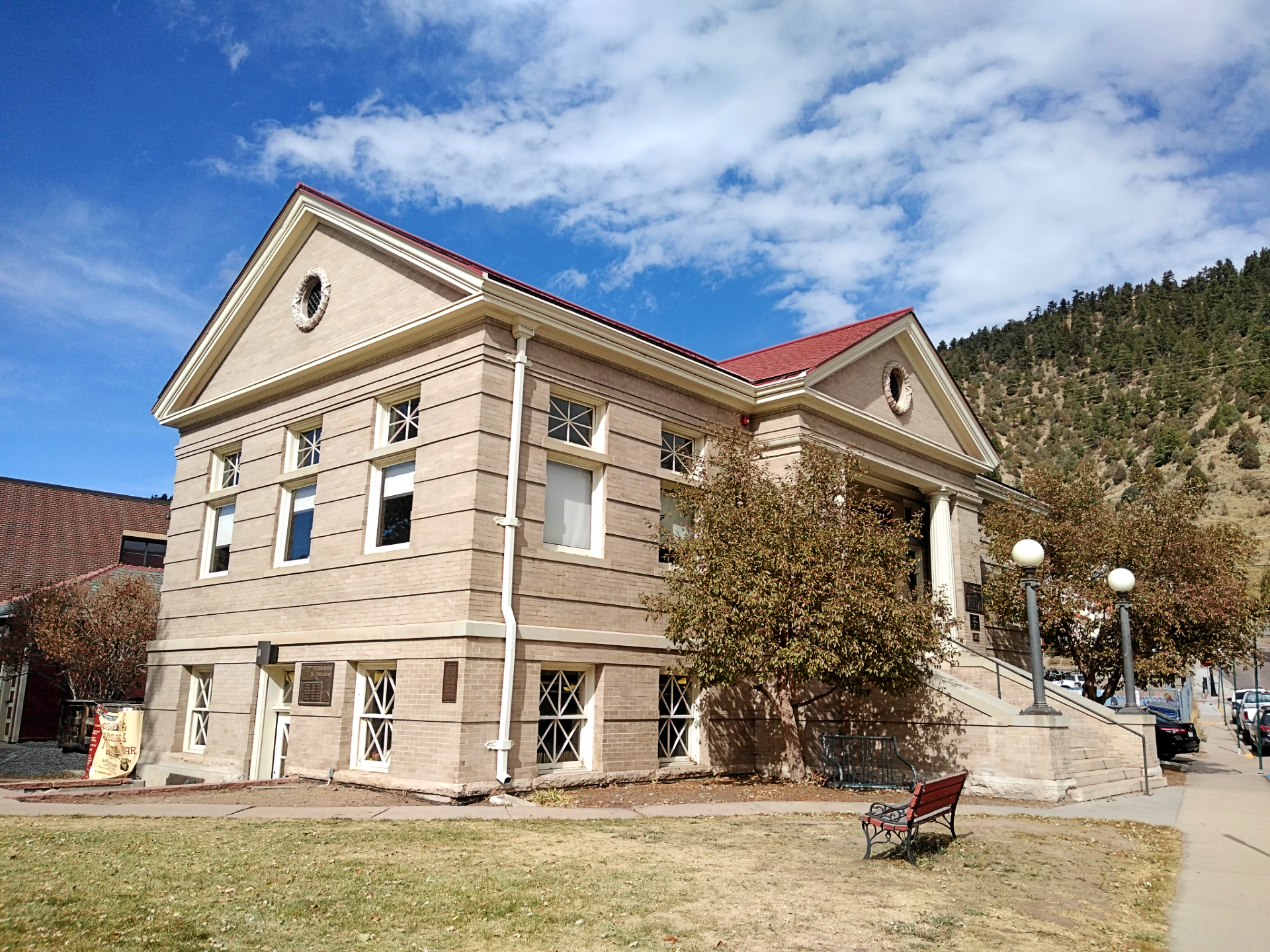
Idaho Springs Public Library in Idaho Springs, Colorado.

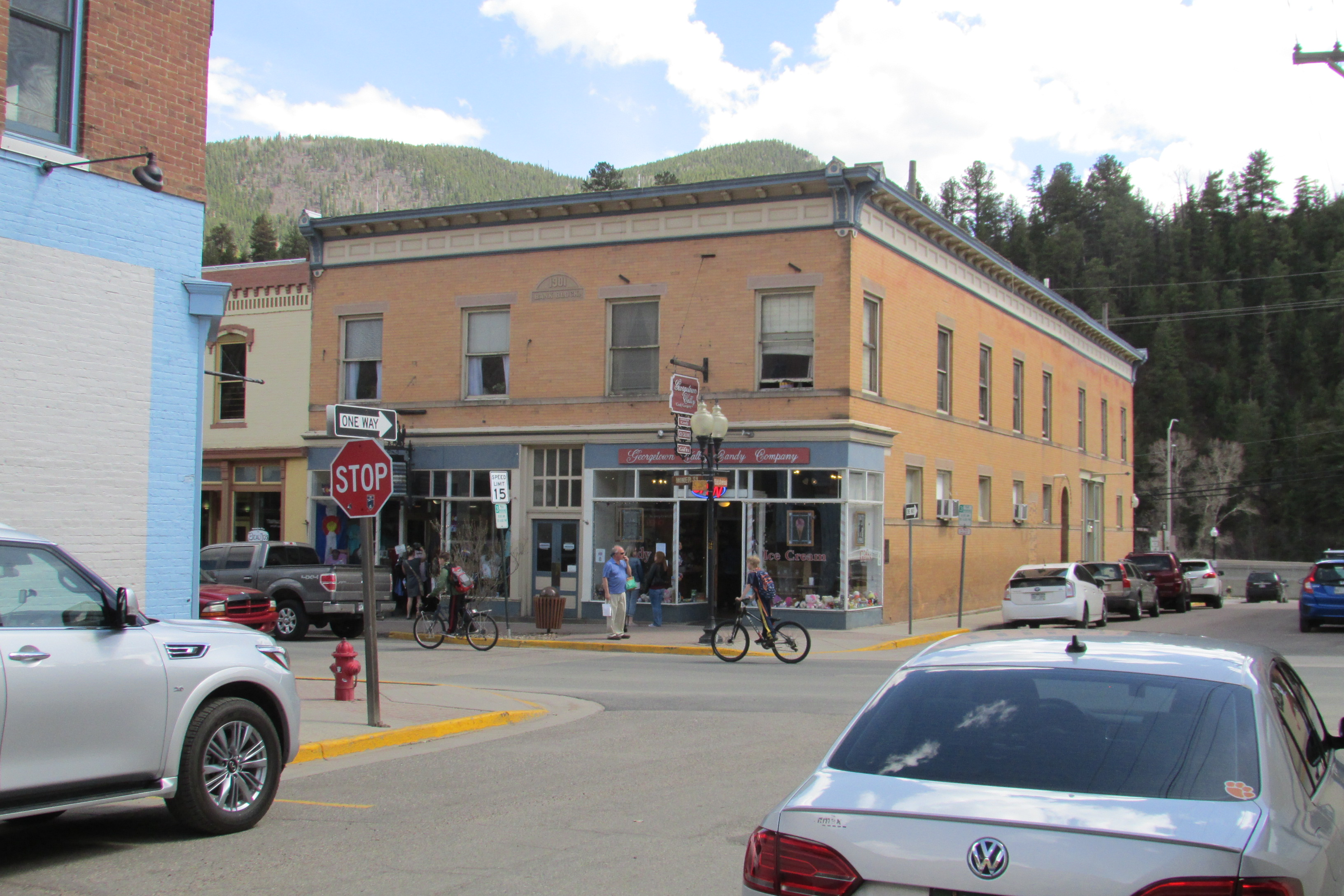
Miners Merchant & Bank (Bank Block) on the corner of Miner and 15th Streets in Idaho Springs, Colo.

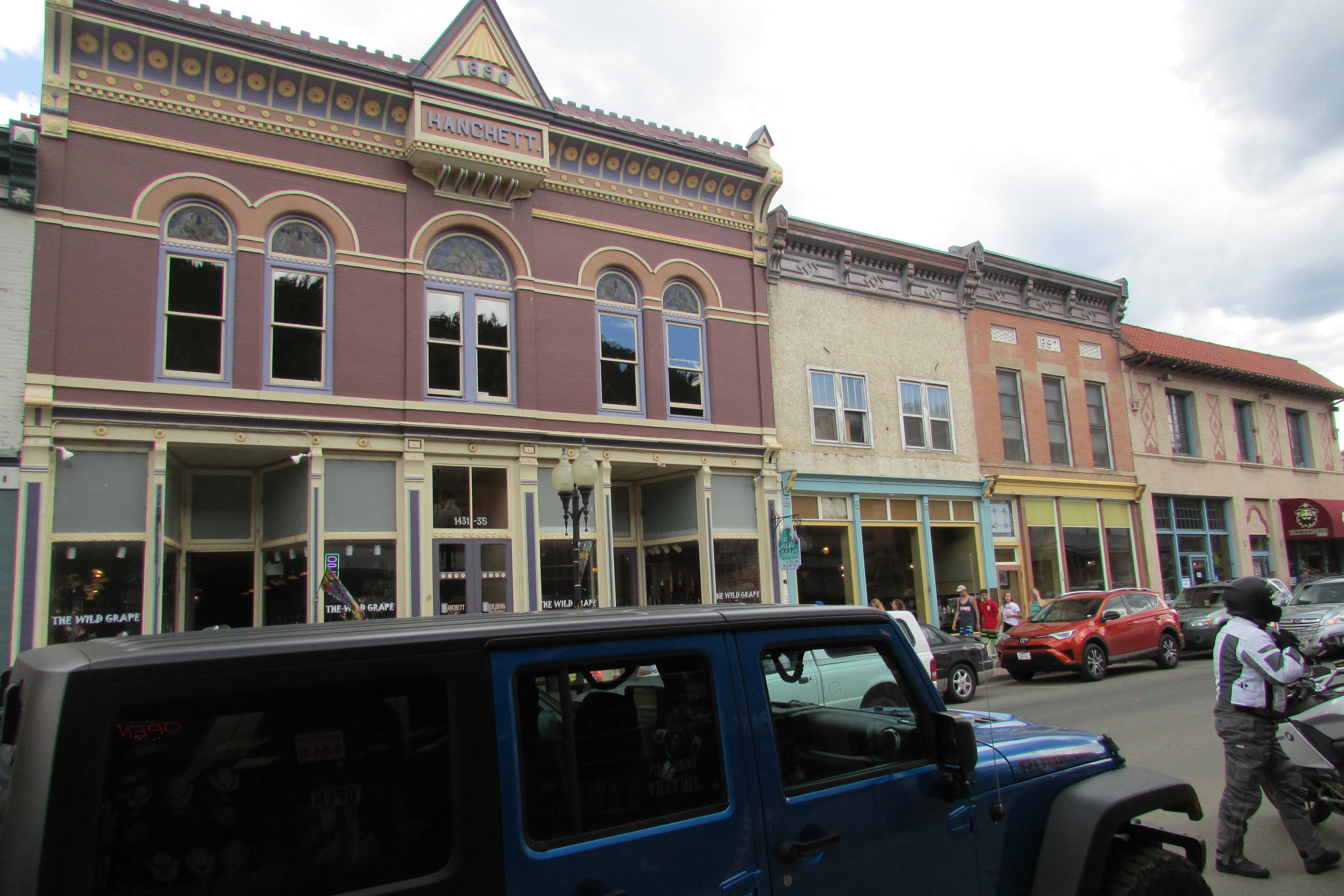
Hanchett Building in Idaho Springs, Colo.
