= Fire Station No. 2 (Waterloo, Iowa) =

- U.S. National Register of Historic Places
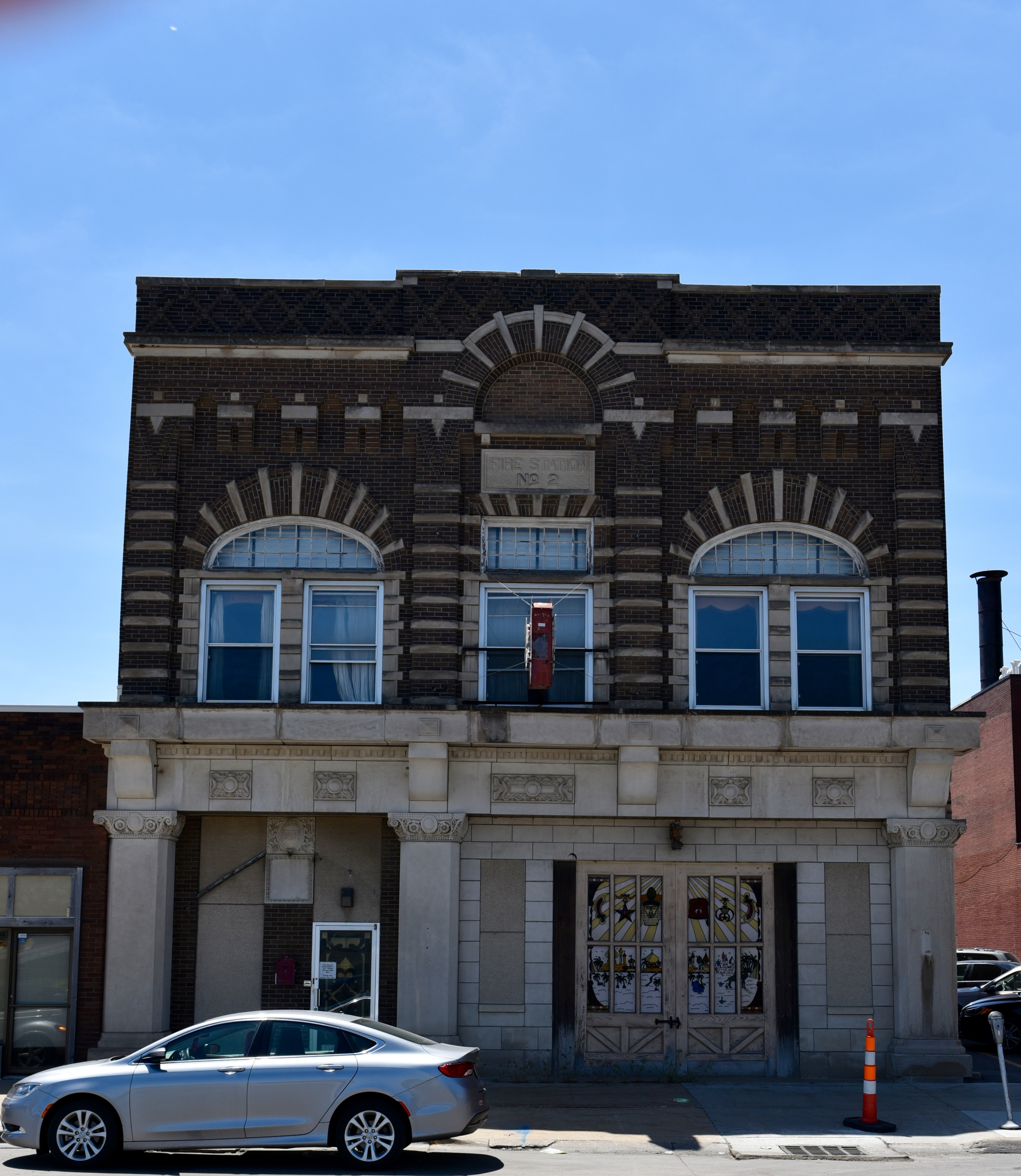

- Location within Iowa Location within the United States
- Location: 716 Commercial St. Waterloo, Iowa
- Coordinates: 42°29′37.8″N 92°20′17.5″W
- Area: less than one acre
- Built: 1907
- Architect: John G. Ralston
- Architectural style: Renaissance Revival; Romanesque Revival
- MPS: Waterloo MPS
- NRHP reference No.: 88001321
- Added to NRHP: November 29, 1988

Fire Station No. 2, also known as El Mecca Shrine Club, is a historic building in Waterloo, Iowa. The city's paid fire department was established in 1904; previously, private fire companies served Waterloo. Built in 1907, this is the only early fire station remaining in the city. The building is an eclectic combination of Renaissance Revival and Romanesque Revival styles, and was designed by prominent Waterloo architect John G. Ralston. Decorative elements on the main floor include columns with foliated capitals that support a broad entablature. The second story is primarily brick with lighter stone accents that create a polychromatic effect. The building functioned as a fire station until 1969, when the city built five new stations. Afterwards, Black Hawk County used the building as an office for issuing food stamps. El Mecca Shrine acquired the building in 1976 and converted it into a restaurant and club. It was listed on the National Register of Historic Places in 1988.
