= Fire House No. 2 (Billings, Montana) =

- U.S. National Register of Historic Places
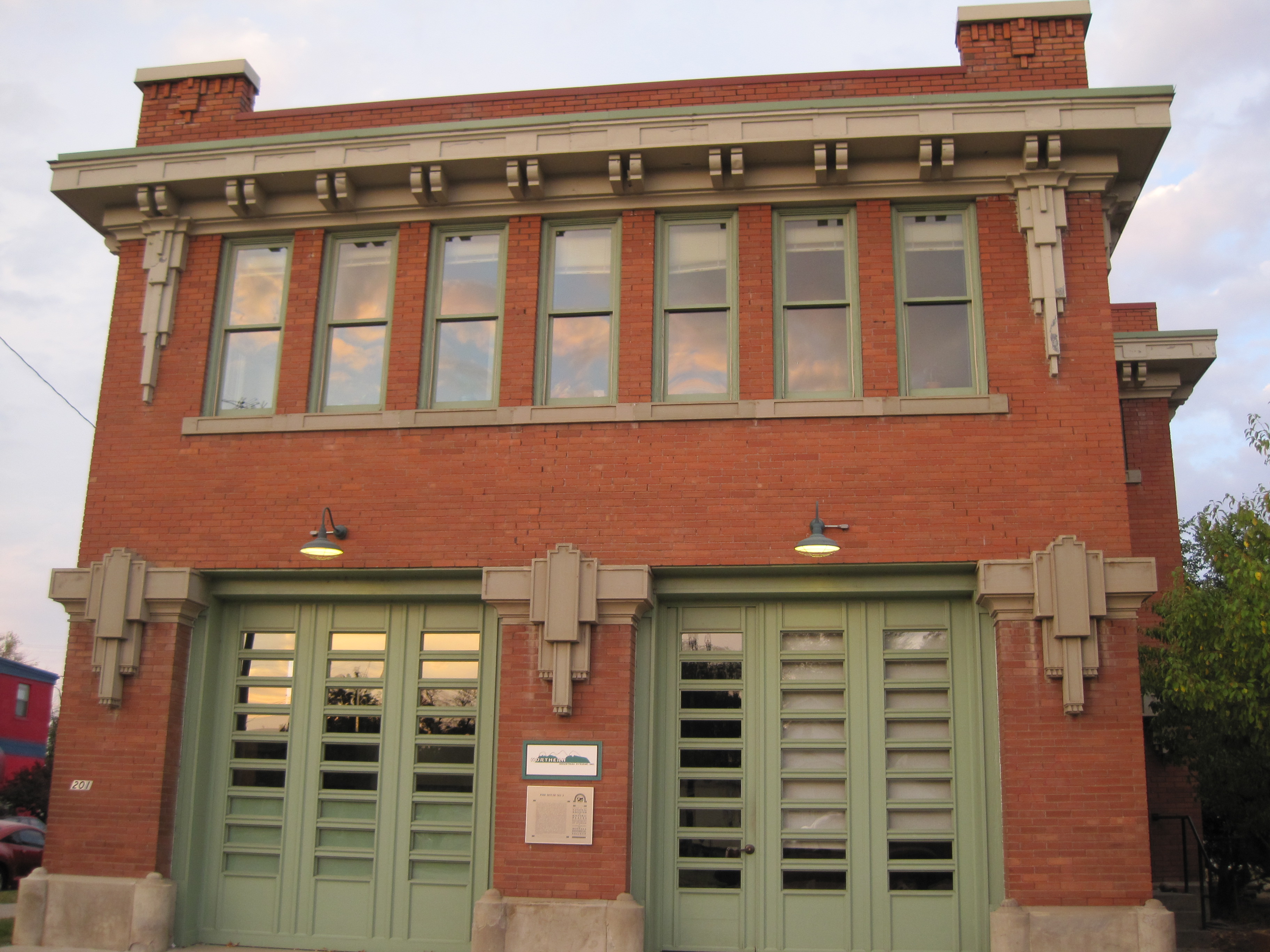

- Location within Montana
- Location: 201 S. 30th St., Billings, Montana
- Coordinates: 45°46′39″N 108°30′12″W
- Area: less than one acre
- Built: 1911
- Architect: Curtis E. Ohme
- Architectural style: Prairie School
- NRHP reference No.: 80002436
- Added to NRHP: February 29, 1980

The Fire House No. 2 in Billings, Montana, at 201 S. 30th St., was built in 1911. It has also been known as the South Side Fire Station. It was listed on the National Register of Historic Places in 1980.

It is Prairie School in style with ornamentation in abstracted Greek Revival style. It is a two-story red brick building with a full basement. On its second floor it included an apartment for the fire chief and residence for the firemen.
