= Falls Fire Barn Museum =

Museum in North Attleborough, Massachusetts

- Fire Barn
- U.S. National Register of Historic Places
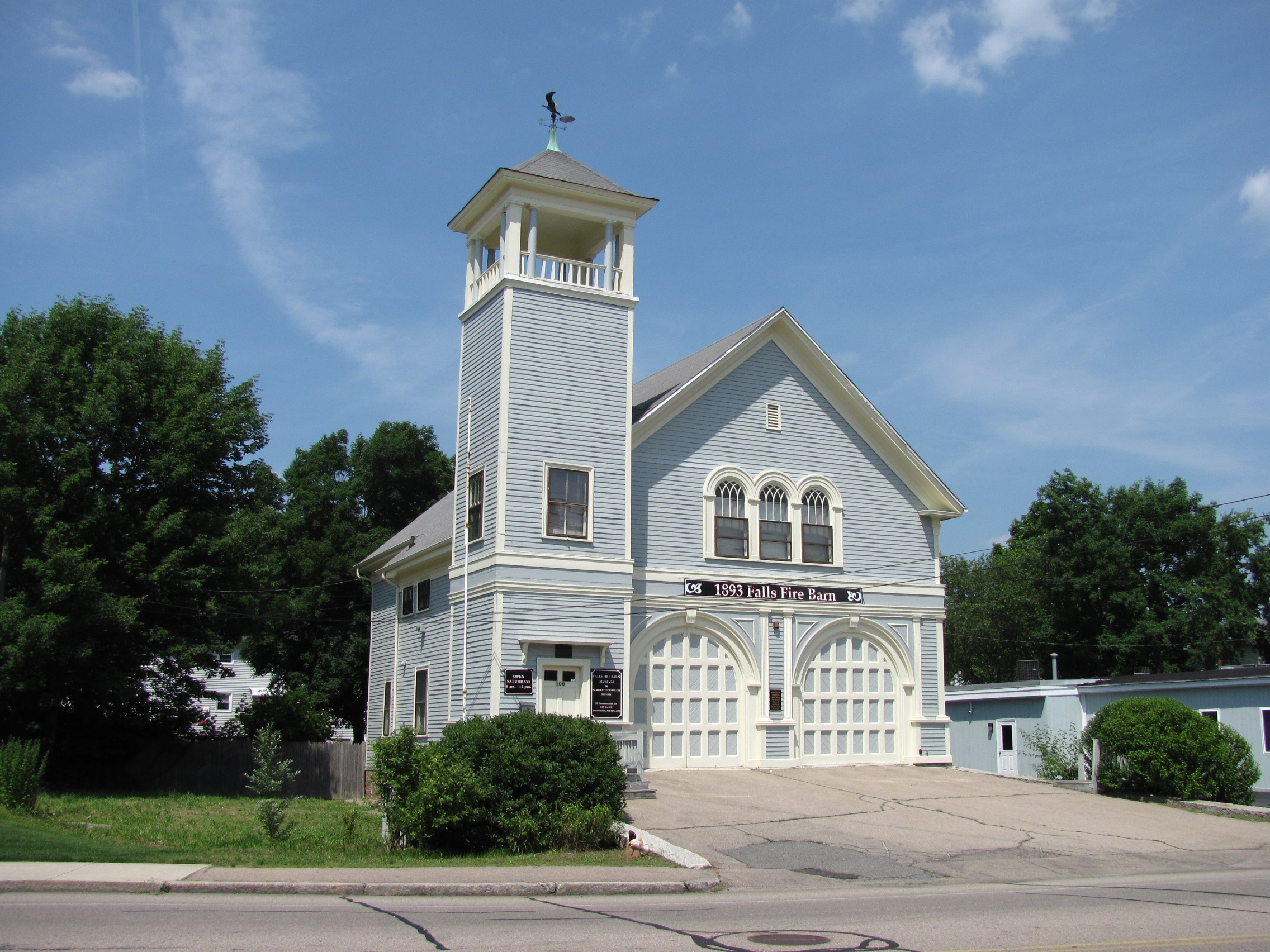
- Falls Fire Barn

- Location within Massachusetts Location within the United States
- Location: North Attleborough, Massachusetts
- Coordinates: 41°58′17″N 71°18′52″W
- Built: 1893
- NRHP reference No.: 82004960
- Added to NRHP: January 28, 1982

The Falls Fire Barn Museum, also known as the Fire Barn or Falls Fire Station No. 2 is a historic fire station on Commonwealth Avenue in the village of Attleboro Falls in North Attleborough, Massachusetts, United States. It was listed on the National Register of Historic Places as "Fire Barn" in 1982.

== History ==
The Italianate two story structure was built in 1893 and added to the National Register of Historic Places in 1982. It was an active fire station until 1976 and housed Engines 1 and 2, when it was replaced by a station built on Kelly Blvd (Rte 152). It has since been made into a museum for the local fire dept as well as the town history in general, and has many artifacts of local interest. The first curator was the late George Cunningham, who was active there until his late 90s.

== Visiting information ==
It is supported by admission fees and by fundraisers sponsored by the local historical society.

== See also ==
- National Register of Historic Places listings in Bristol County, Massachusetts
