= Hose House No. 2 (Idaho Springs, Colorado) =

Historic place in Colorado, United States

- U.S. National Register of Historic Places
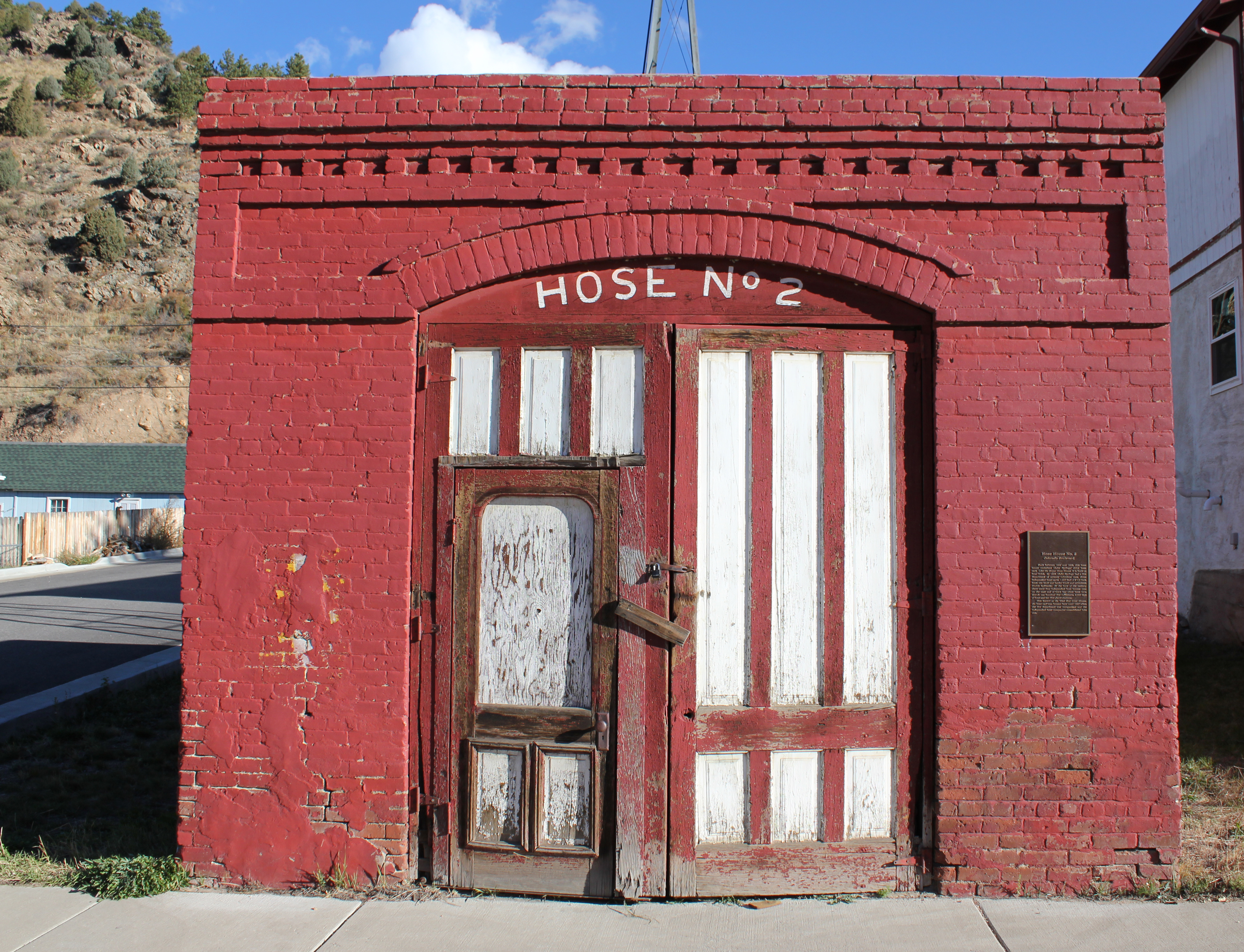

- Location within Colorado
- Location: 600 Colorado Blvd., Idaho Springs, Colorado
- Coordinates: 39°44′39″N 105°31′33″W
- Area: less than one acre
- Built: c.1882
- Architectural style: Late Victorian
- NRHP reference No.: 98000173
- Added to NRHP: March 19, 1998

Hose House No. 2, at 600 Colorado Blvd. in Idaho Springs, Colorado, was built around 1882. It was listed on the National Register of Historic Places in 1998.

It is a one-story 16 by 20 feet (4.9 m × 6.1 m) building. "It was built to house a fire hose cart associated with early volunteer fire fighting efforts in the west end of Idaho Springs." It served in that way until 1929.

It has also been known as the West End Hose House and as the 6th and Colorado Hose House.

== See also ==
- Bryan Hose House
- National Register of Historic Places listings in Clear Creek County, Colorado
