= Alpine Hose Company No. 2 =

- U.S. National Register of Historic Places
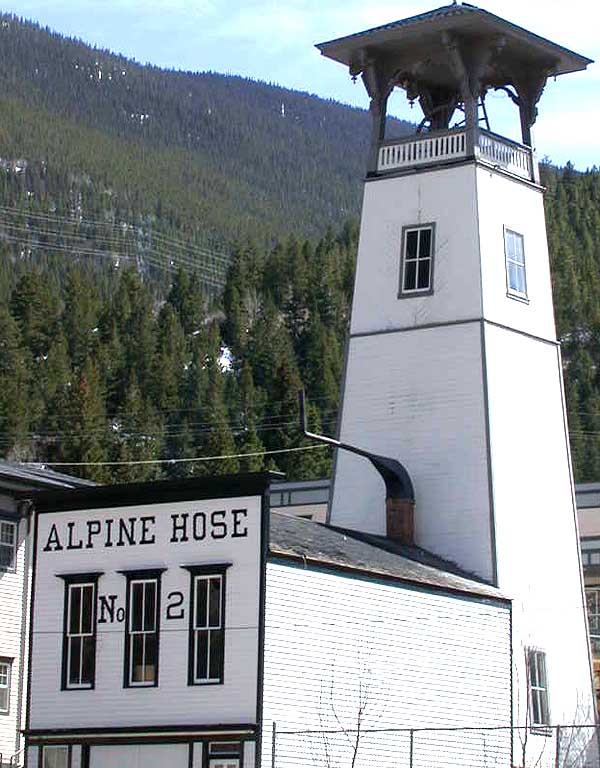

- Location within Colorado
- Location: 507 5th St., Georgetown, Colorado
- Coordinates: 39°42′19″N 105°41′48″W
- Area: 0.5 acres (0.20 ha)
- Built: 1874, 1878, 1880
- NRHP reference No.: 73000464
- Added to NRHP: January 25, 1973

Alpine Hose Company No. 2 was organized in Georgetown, Colorado. Its building at 507 5th St. in Georgetown, dating from 1874 (Note: Note the NRHP document states in one place it was built in 1874, and elsewhere states its component structures were built in 1878 and 1880.) was listed on the National Register of Historic Places in 1973.

The building consists of two structures: a hose house which was built in 1878, and a bell tower built in 1880.
