= Silver Plume, Colorado =

Town in Colorado, United States

Town of Silver Plume, Colorado
- Town
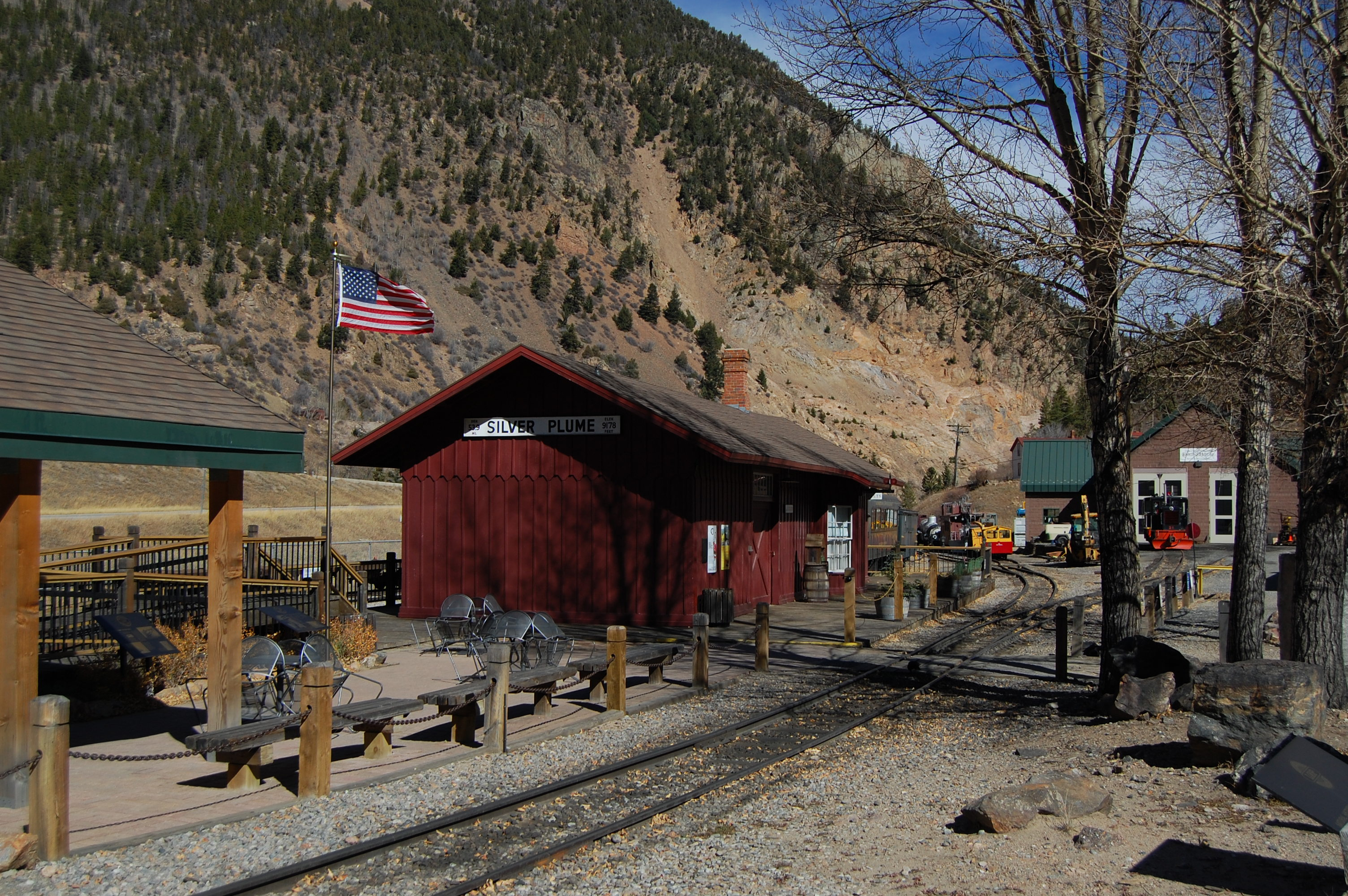
- Train station in Silver Plume

- Location of Silver Plume in Clear Creek County, Colorado.
- Coordinates: 39°41′45″N 105°43′35″W
- Country: United States
- State: Colorado
- County: Clear Creek County
- Incorporated: September 24, 1880

Government
  - Type: Statutory Town

Area
  - Total: 0.26 sq mi (0.68 km^{2})
  - Land: 0.26 sq mi (0.67 km^{2})
  - Water: 0.0039 sq mi (0.01 km^{2})
- Elevation: 9,118 ft (2,779 m)

Population (2020)
  - Total: 207
  - Density: 800/sq mi (310/km^{2})
- Time zone: UTC-7 (MST)
  - Summer (DST): UTC-6 (MDT)
- ZIP code: 80476
- Area codes: Both 303 and 720
- FIPS code: 08-70360
- GNIS feature ID: 2413287
- Website: silverplumetown.com

Silver Plume is a statutory town located in Clear Creek County, Colorado, United States. Silver Plume is a former silver mining camp along Clear Creek in the Front Range of the Rocky Mountains. The federally designated Georgetown-Silver Plume Historic District comprises Silver Plume, the neighboring town of Georgetown, and the Georgetown Loop Historic Mining & Railroad Park between the two towns.

The town population was 207 at the 2020 census. The Silver Plume Post Office has the ZIP code 80476.

== History ==
The family of John Henry Bowman (1850–1900) came to the Silver Plume area in 1864. The Silver Plume, Colorado, post office opened on December 1, 1875, and the Town of Silver Plume was incorporated on September 24, 1880. The spelling of the town's name was briefly changed to Silverplume, but was later changed back to the original Silver Plume. The town has a very rich history. That history can be viewed by the general public either at the George Rowe Museum, which is in the original school house of the town, or by walking the 7:30 Mine Trail, which gives the individual a grand view of the Silver Plume valley and the town nestled at its base.

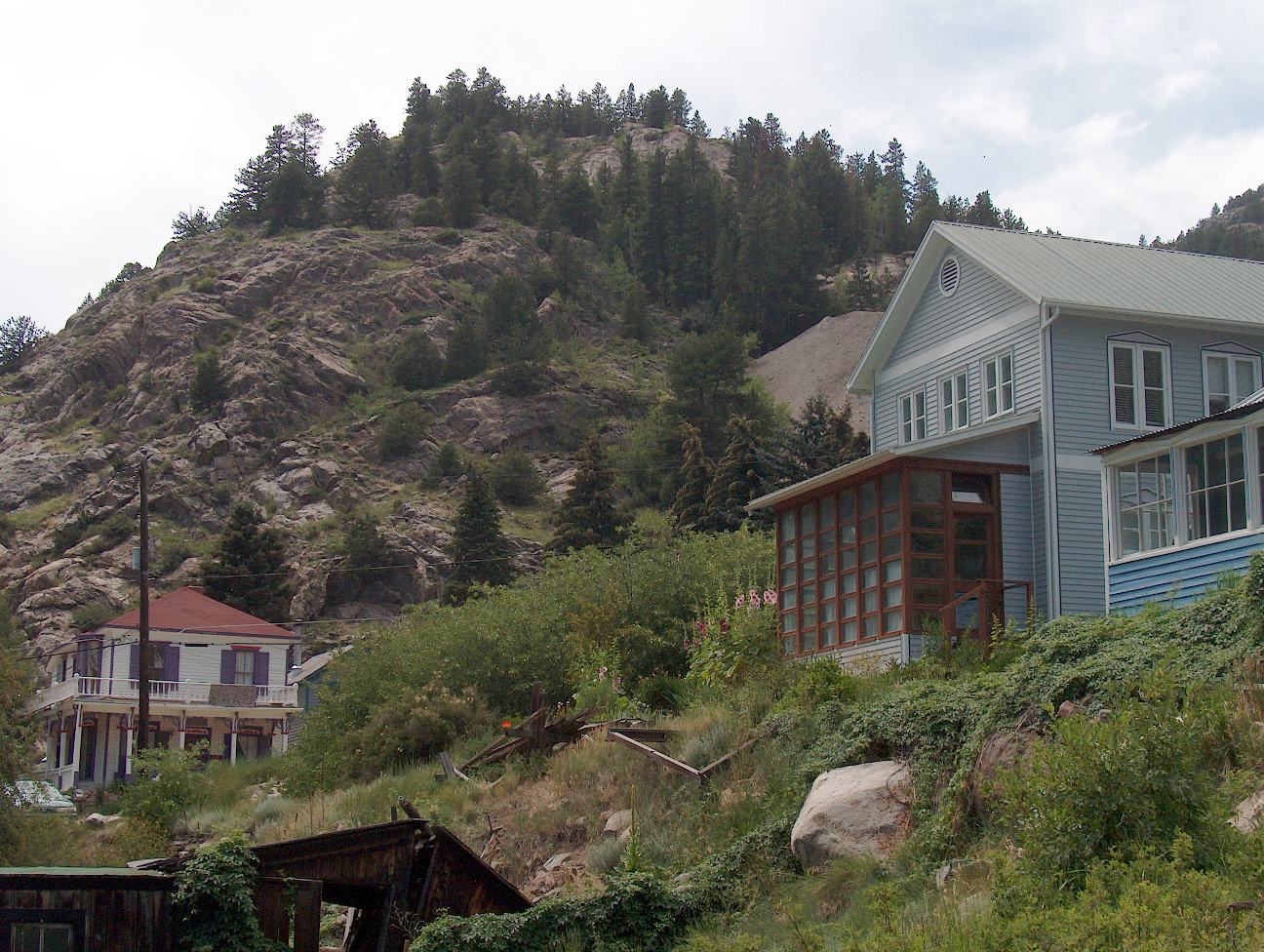
Homes dot a mountainside at Silver Plume, Colorado.

== Demographics ==
Historical population
Census	Pop.	Note	%±
1890	908		—
1900	775		−14.6%
1910	460		−40.6%
1920	272		−40.9%
1930	126		−53.7%
1940	139		10.3%
1950	136		−2.2%
1960	86		−36.8%
1970	164		90.7%
1980	140		−14.6%
1990	134		−4.3%
2000	203		51.5%
2010	170		−16.3%
2020	207		21.8%
U.S. Decennial Census

== Geography ==
Silver Plume is located in the valley of Clear Creek. Interstate 70 and U.S. Route 6 pass through the town, with access from Exit 226. It is 20 miles (32 km) west across the Continental Divide to Silverthorne and 46 miles (74 km) east to Denver.

According to the United States Census Bureau, the town of Silver Plume has a total area of 0.2 square miles (0.6 km^{2}), all of it land.

=== Climate ===
According to the Köppen Climate Classification system, Silver Plume has a subarctic climate, abbreviated "Dfc" on climate maps.

Climate data for Cabin Creek, Colorado, 1991–2020 normals, extremes 1968–present
Month	Jan	Feb	Mar	Apr	May	Jun	Jul	Aug	Sep	Oct	Nov	Dec	Year
Record high °F (°C)	56 (13)	55 (13)	65 (18)	64 (18)	75 (24)	81 (27)	85 (29)	79 (26)	78 (26)	76 (24)	63 (17)	57 (14)	85 (29)
Mean maximum °F (°C)	48.4 (9.1)	47.0 (8.3)	53.1 (11.7)	58.0 (14.4)	66.9 (19.4)	75.4 (24.1)	77.0 (25.0)	74.6 (23.7)	71.9 (22.2)	65.6 (18.7)	54.6 (12.6)	48.1 (8.9)	77.7 (25.4)
Mean daily maximum °F (°C)	31.8 (−0.1)	31.5 (−0.3)	37.9 (3.3)	42.8 (6.0)	52.6 (11.4)	64.2 (17.9)	69.3 (20.7)	67.1 (19.5)	61.2 (16.2)	49.8 (9.9)	39.2 (4.0)	31.9 (−0.1)	48.3 (9.0)
Daily mean °F (°C)	21.9 (−5.6)	21.5 (−5.8)	27.4 (−2.6)	32.8 (0.4)	41.9 (5.5)	52.2 (11.2)	57.4 (14.1)	55.6 (13.1)	49.4 (9.7)	39.2 (4.0)	28.9 (−1.7)	22.0 (−5.6)	37.5 (3.1)
Mean daily minimum °F (°C)	12.0 (−11.1)	11.5 (−11.4)	16.9 (−8.4)	22.8 (−5.1)	31.3 (−0.4)	40.1 (4.5)	45.5 (7.5)	44.0 (6.7)	37.6 (3.1)	28.5 (−1.9)	18.6 (−7.4)	12.2 (−11.0)	26.8 (−2.9)
Mean minimum °F (°C)	−8.1 (−22.3)	−8.5 (−22.5)	−2.4 (−19.1)	4.6 (−15.2)	16.2 (−8.8)	28.5 (−1.9)	37.2 (2.9)	35.8 (2.1)	24.3 (−4.3)	8.4 (−13.1)	−2.7 (−19.3)	−8.9 (−22.7)	−13.6 (−25.3)
Record low °F (°C)	−28 (−33)	−28 (−33)	−20 (−29)	−14 (−26)	2 (−17)	18 (−8)	27 (−3)	24 (−4)	9 (−13)	−9 (−23)	−21 (−29)	−23 (−31)	−28 (−33)
Average precipitation inches (mm)	0.99 (25)	1.23 (31)	2.04 (52)	2.79 (71)	2.15 (55)	1.55 (39)	2.77 (70)	2.63 (67)	1.63 (41)	1.40 (36)	1.31 (33)	1.16 (29)	21.65 (549)
Average snowfall inches (cm)	15.9 (40)	19.3 (49)	24.9 (63)	28.4 (72)	11.9 (30)	0.3 (0.76)	0.0 (0.0)	0.1 (0.25)	2.1 (5.3)	10.4 (26)	20.1 (51)	20.3 (52)	153.7 (389.31)
Average precipitation days (≥ 0.01 in)	7.7	8.6	9.0	10.4	9.0	8.1	13.2	14.3	9.3	7.4	7.1	7.8	111.9
Average snowy days (≥ 0.1 in)	7.8	8.9	8.9	9.6	3.8	0.3	0.0	0.0	0.6	4.8	6.6	7.6	58.9
Source 1: NOAA
Source 2: National Weather Service

== See also ==
- List of National Register of Historic Places in Clear Creek County, Colorado
- List of statistical areas in Colorado
