= Georgetown, Colorado =

Town in Colorado, United States

- Territorial charter municipality
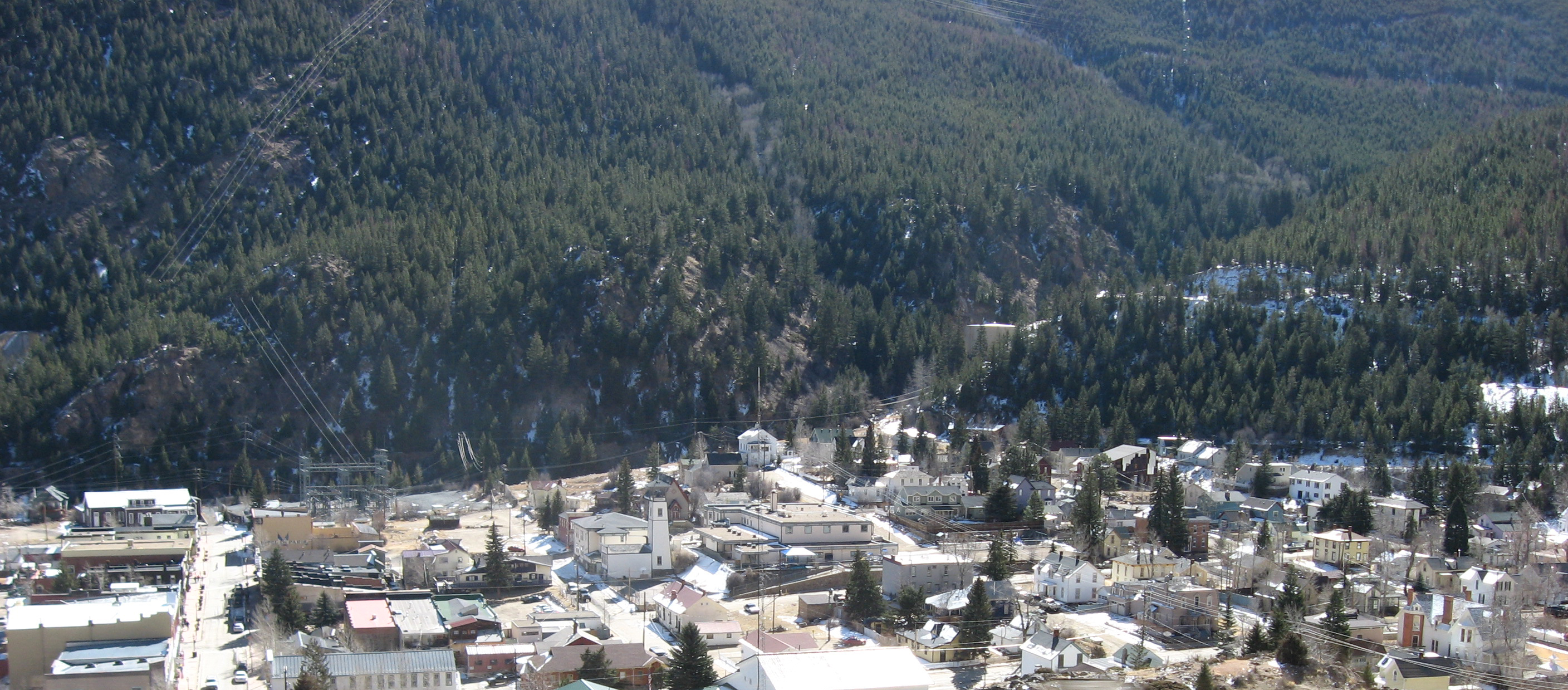
- Georgetown as seen from I-70

- Flag Logo

- Location of the Town of Georgetown in Clear Creek County, Colorado
- Coordinates: 39°43′05″N 105°41′39″W
- Country: United States
- State: Colorado
- County: Clear Creek
- Established: 1859
- Incorporated: November 16, 1885

Government
  - Type: Territorial Charter Municipality

Area
  - Total: 1.098 sq mi (2.845 km^{2})
  - Land: 0.997 sq mi (2.583 km^{2})
  - Water: 0.101 sq mi (0.262 km^{2})
- Elevation: 8,458 ft (2,578 m)

Population (2020)
  - Total: 1,118
  - Density: 1,121/sq mi (433/km^{2})
- Time zone: UTC−07:00 (MST)
  - Summer (DST): UTC−06:00 (MDT)
- ZIP code: 80444
- Area codes: Both 303 and 720
- FIPS code: 08-29735
- GNIS feature ID: 2412677
- Highways: I-70
- Website: www.townofgeorgetown.us
- The only surviving Colorado Territorial Charter Municipality

Georgetown is the territorial charter municipality that is the county seat of Clear Creek County, Colorado, United States. The town population was 1,118 at the 2020 United States census. Georgetown has a 2026 population of 1,324, and is growing at a rate of 2.64% annually. The former silver mining camp along Clear Creek in the Front Range of the Rocky Mountains was established in 1859 during the Pike's Peak Gold Rush. The federally designated Georgetown-Silver Plume Historic District comprises Georgetown, the neighboring town of Silver Plume, and the Georgetown Loop Historic Mining & Railroad Park between the two towns. The Georgetown Post Office has the ZIP code 80444.

The town sits at an elevation of 8,530 feet (2,600 m) above sea level, nestled in the mountains near the upper end of the valley of Clear Creek in the mountains west of Denver along I-70. Although population was only about 1,000 at the 2010 census, the town was a historic center of the mining industry in Colorado during the late 19th century, earning the nickname the "Silver Queen of Colorado". It has evolved into a lively historical summer tourist center today with many preserved structures from the heyday of the Colorado Silver Boom. The town stretches roughly north–south along Clear Creek, hemmed in by the mountains, with the historic downtown located at the southern (upper) end and modern development located at the northern (lower) end of town. Georgetown is now a part of the Denver-Aurora-Centennial, CO Metropolitan Statistical Area and the Front Range Urban Corridor.

== History ==
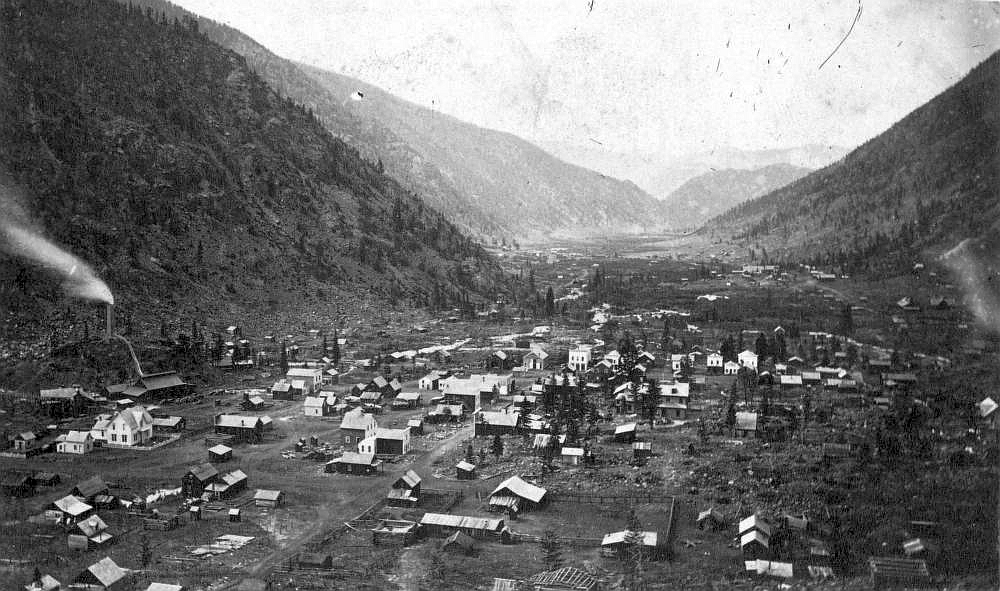
Georgetown, 1867

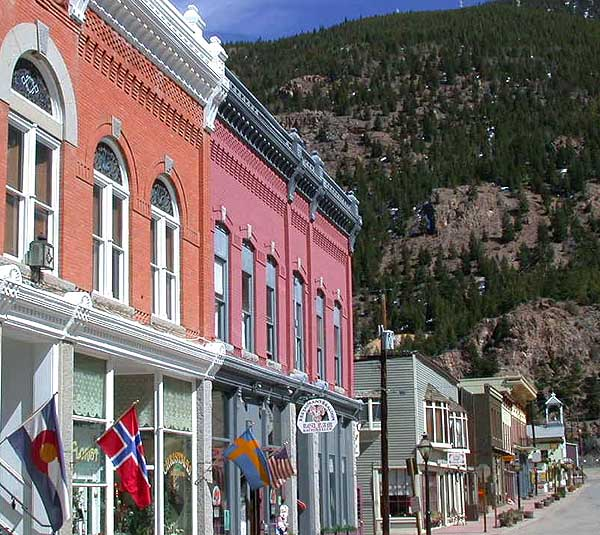
View west along Sixth Street in downtown Georgetown, with the historic Masonic Temple in the foreground

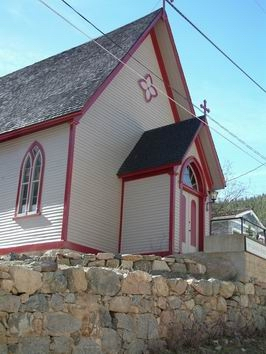
Grace Episcopal Church, built in 1870, now overlooks Interstate 70.

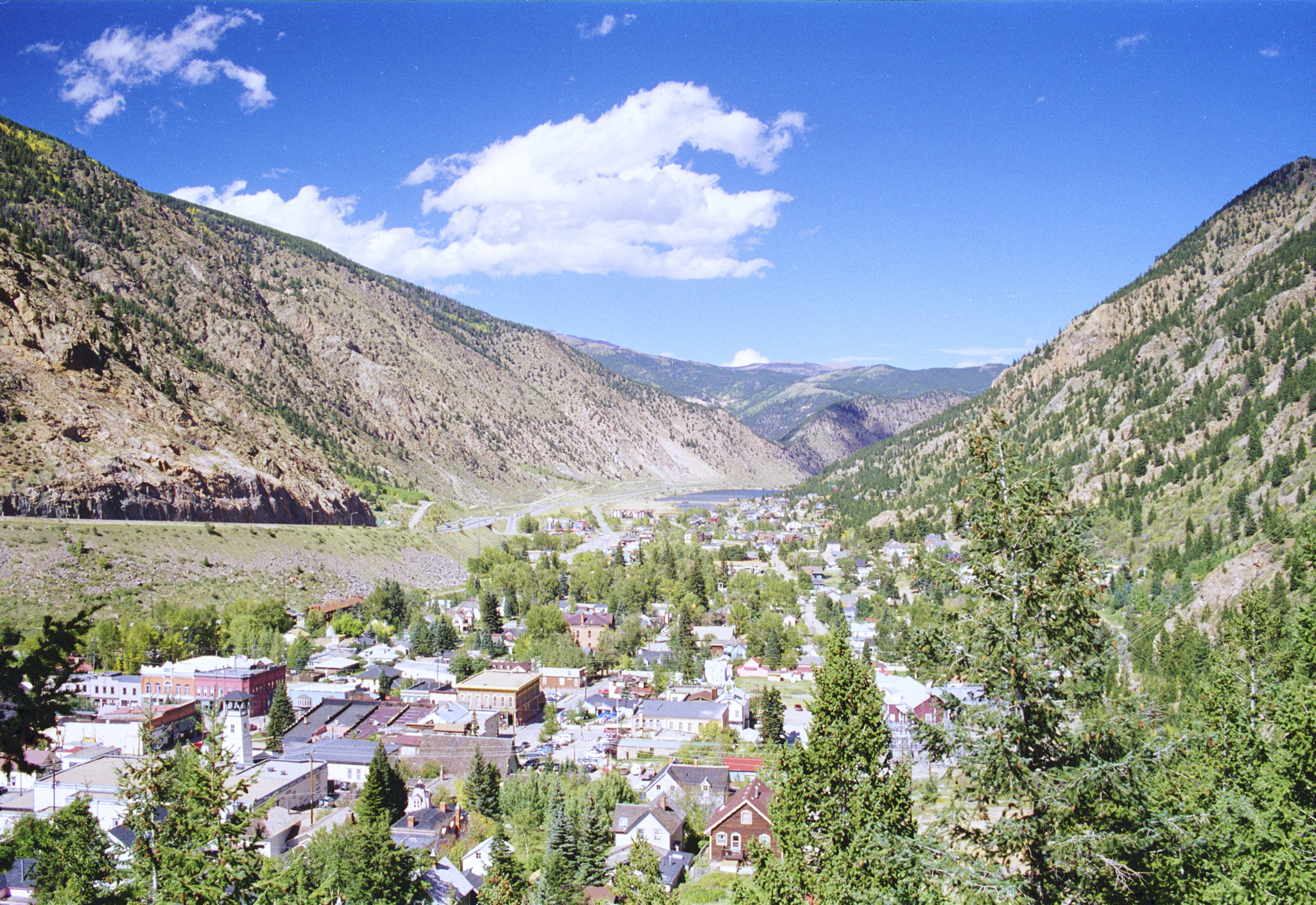
Georgetown

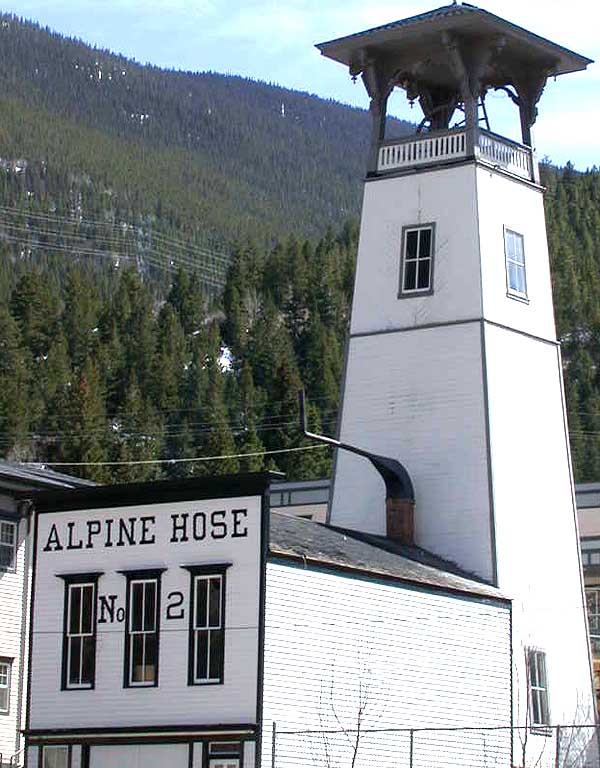
The historic Alpine Hose Firehouse No. 2 in Georgetown

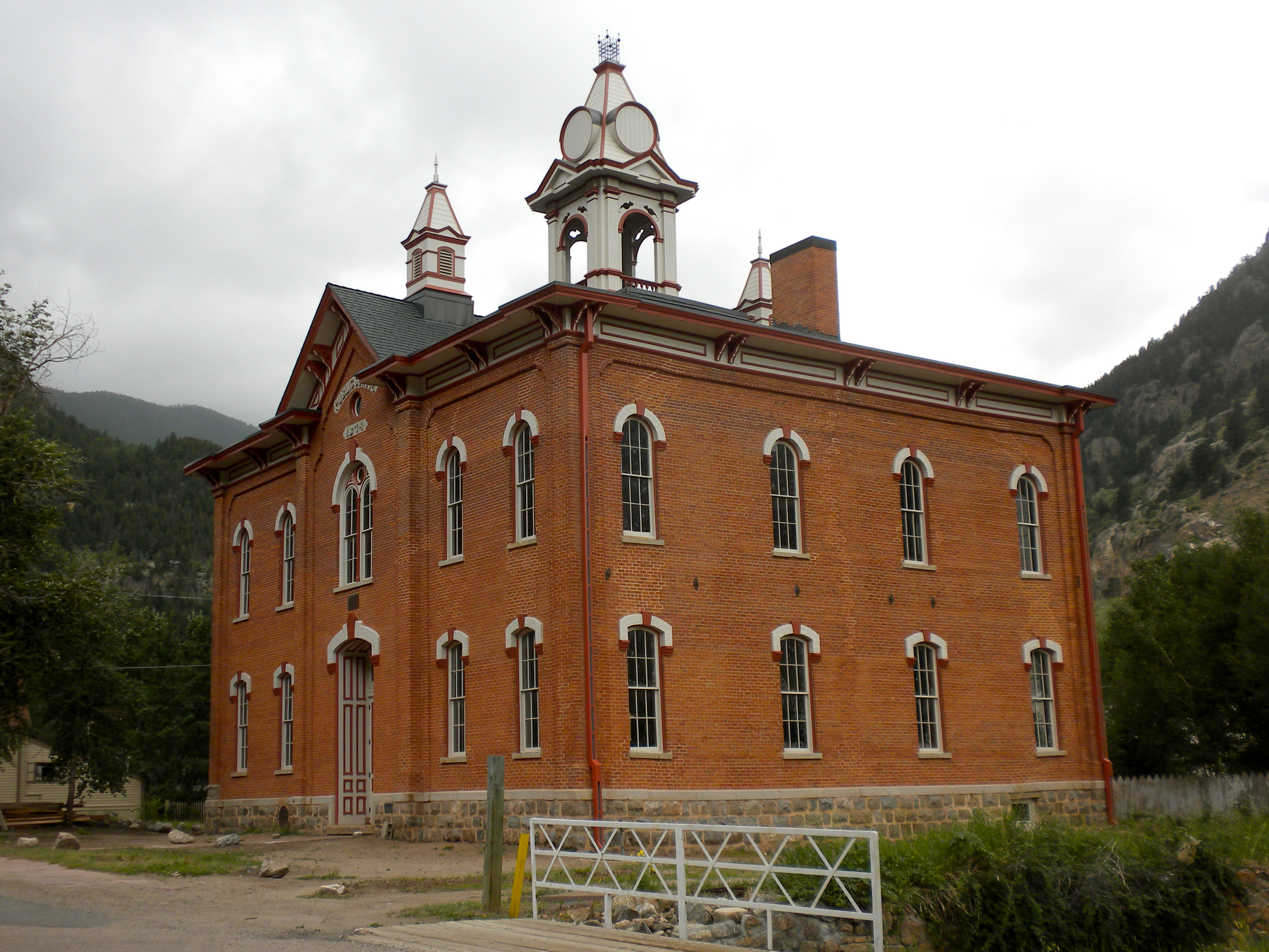
Georgetown Public School

The area was first settled in 1859 during the Pike's Peak Gold Rush. George and David Griffith were members of a mining party which decided to separate from the others in the Central City and Idaho Springs areas. They found gold in Clear Creek (near the present-day site of the Alpine Inn) and decided to settle in the area for the rest of the summer and fall. The Griffith Mining District incorporated in June 1860. Soon after the formation of the Griffith Mining District, several early residents joined to form the "Georgetown Company," claiming 640 acres for a townsite. The townsite would be overseen by the Griffith Mining District. The commercial district was tagged "Main Street," a name which would continue into the 20th century. The center of the nascent town was roughly in the area of the I-70 interchange, close to the present-day Rutherford stables.

Silver, the main product from the district, was not discovered until 1864. John Henry Bowman (1850–1900) came to Silver Plume, Colorado, in 1883, then moved to Georgetown, Colorado, in 1885. A machinist, he worked as foreman of the Miners Sampling Works. Later, he was superintendent of the American Sisters Mine, a company in which he owned stock. American Sisters Mine was a consolidation of Two Sisters Mine and Native American Mine, silver mines located on Columbia Mountain in upper Clear Creek County, Colorado. In 1891–1892, John Bowman and his wife, Lavinia Potts Bowman (1848–1901) built what later became known as the Bowman/White House in Georgetown (a historical site today). There they raised two daughters, Iorria and Mary Ellen ("Mellie"). In 1899, Iorria married J. E. Carnal and moved to Ohio.

For the most part, Mellie (1876–1969) stayed in the family home after she married John James ("J.J.") White (1870–1932) in 1901. She inherited half of her father's share in the American Sisters Mine and served on the Georgetown Library Association from 1911–1922.

Mellie's husband, John James White Sr., bought the remaining stock of what was now called the Two American Sisters Mine. He managed construction of a dam and power plant north of Georgetown, and built a new shaft house and mill at the mine site. White, an attorney, practiced law, served as the Police Judge (Mayor) of Georgetown from 1900–1902, and was President of the Georgetown school board. The Bowman-White House still remains, and is registered as a historical site in Georgetown, Colorado.

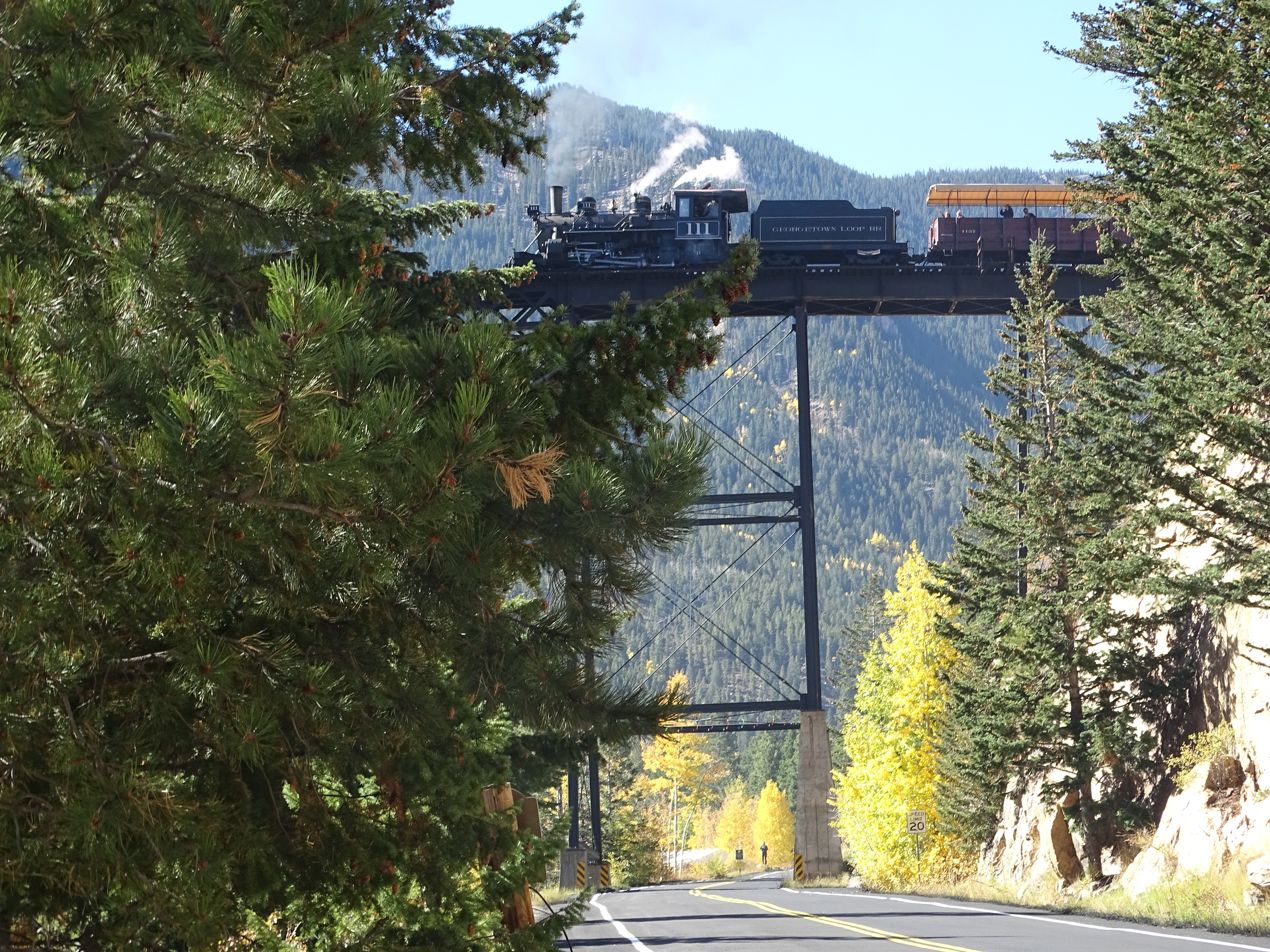
Georgetown Loop Railroad on overhead tressle

In the fall of 1867 discussions began about the formation of a town. On January 28, 1868, the Territorial Legislature passed a law incorporating the Town of Georgetown. A few months later it wrested the county seat from nearby Idaho Springs, which is a larger community today. The historic courthouse dates from this year. Georgetown is the only Colorado municipality that still operates under a charter from the Territory of Colorado which includes a Police Judge as Mayor and a Board of Selectmen instead of a Town Council. The building of the narrow-gauge Colorado Central Railroad up the canyon from Golden in the 1870s further increased the central position of the town. Although most of the railroad was later removed, a portion remained between the town and Silver Plume and is operated today as a tourist railroad called the Georgetown Loop. The town experienced its greatest growth and prosperity during the Colorado silver boom of the 1880s when it rivaled Leadville to the west as the mining capital of Colorado. At one time, before the collapse of the silver boom in 1893, the town population exceeded 10,000, and a movement arose briefly among local citizens to move the state capital there from Denver.

The frontier gambler, Poker Alice, lived for a time in Georgetown and in several other Colorado communities where she was considered an expert player and dealer.

Following the collapse of the Silver Boom, the town population dwindled. In the 1950s the town began to experience a small renaissance as an après-ski watering hole for the thousands of skiers who passed through the town on their way down from the mountains at the ski areas near Loveland Pass and Guanella Pass. Small craft shops began to set up businesses in the once decrepit 19th century storefronts. By the late 1960s, the establishment of a museum in one of the historic hotels had made the town a popular summer tourist destination where visitors could relive the experience of walking among structures from the mining boom. Furthermore, as the front range ski areas grow in popularity, the town makes for a good midway-stop for the returning skiers coming through I-70. More winter sports traffic comes from the nearby Otter Mountain, and in the winter the town's hotels house many skiers.

The made-for-TV movie The Christmas Gift, starring John Denver, was filmed in Georgetown in 1986. The film is about a widower and his daughter who go to Georgetown for vacation and business and find the true meaning of Christmas.

Other movies filmed at least partly in Georgetown include the made-for-TV movies "Perry Mason: The Case of the Reckless Romeo, and "Perry Mason: The Case of the Skin Deep Scandal"; and the feature film "Switchback" with Danny Glover and Dennis Quaid; and at least one scene from "The Duchess and the Dirtwater Fox", with Goldie Hawn and George Segal. In addition, it has been the site for the filming of various commercials, and some music videos, including part of John Tesh's "A Romantic Christmas."

The Sonic Bloom Music Festival previously took place every June in Georgetown, but has been on hiatus since 2024.

On February 19, 2020, a dog named Parker was sworn in as honorary mayor of Georgetown. He was unanimously elected by the town Board of Selectmen.

Georgetown was the setting of the 1870-set Roblox videogame, "Pax Americana", released in 2024.

== Geography ==
Georgetown is located in the valley of Clear Creek. I-70 and US 6 run along the western edge of the town, with access from Exit 228. It is 45 miles (72 km) east to Denver and 22 miles (35 km) west across the Continental Divide to Silverthorne.

At the 2020 United States census, the town had a total area of 703 acres (2.845 km^{2}) including 65 acres (0.262 km^{2}) of water.

=== Climate ===
According to the Köppen Climate Classification system, Georgetown has a warm-summer humid continental climate, abbreviated "Dfb" on climate maps.

Climate data for Georgetown, Colorado, 1991–2020 normals, extremes 1893–present
Month	Jan	Feb	Mar	Apr	May	Jun	Jul	Aug	Sep	Oct	Nov	Dec	Year
Record high °F (°C)	60 (16)	62 (17)	68 (20)	76 (24)	83 (28)	92 (33)	92 (33)	89 (32)	86 (30)	81 (27)	70 (21)	62 (17)	92 (33)
Mean maximum °F (°C)	52.0 (11.1)	51.9 (11.1)	61.6 (16.4)	65.9 (18.8)	73.8 (23.2)	83.9 (28.8)	85.5 (29.7)	82.4 (28.0)	79.9 (26.6)	72.7 (22.6)	62.3 (16.8)	52.1 (11.2)	86.4 (30.2)
Mean daily maximum °F (°C)	36.4 (2.4)	37.7 (3.2)	44.5 (6.9)	49.8 (9.9)	59.6 (15.3)	71.7 (22.1)	77.1 (25.1)	74.5 (23.6)	68.3 (20.2)	56.7 (13.7)	44.2 (6.8)	36.3 (2.4)	54.7 (12.6)
Daily mean °F (°C)	25.9 (−3.4)	26.5 (−3.1)	32.8 (0.4)	37.9 (3.3)	47.1 (8.4)	57.0 (13.9)	62.9 (17.2)	60.5 (15.8)	53.8 (12.1)	43.5 (6.4)	33.0 (0.6)	25.9 (−3.4)	42.2 (5.7)
Mean daily minimum °F (°C)	15.5 (−9.2)	15.3 (−9.3)	21.1 (−6.1)	26.0 (−3.3)	34.6 (1.4)	42.4 (5.8)	48.8 (9.3)	46.5 (8.1)	39.3 (4.1)	30.3 (−0.9)	21.9 (−5.6)	15.4 (−9.2)	29.8 (−1.2)
Mean minimum °F (°C)	−3.1 (−19.5)	−5.3 (−20.7)	3.4 (−15.9)	13.2 (−10.4)	20.9 (−6.2)	33.1 (0.6)	40.5 (4.7)	37.7 (3.2)	28.4 (−2.0)	13.6 (−10.2)	4.6 (−15.2)	−5.0 (−20.6)	−9.6 (−23.1)
Record low °F (°C)	−28 (−33)	−25 (−32)	−15 (−26)	−8 (−22)	7 (−14)	24 (−4)	31 (−1)	29 (−2)	8 (−13)	−4 (−20)	−16 (−27)	−17 (−27)	−28 (−33)
Average precipitation inches (mm)	0.81 (21)	0.90 (23)	1.39 (35)	2.33 (59)	2.13 (54)	1.54 (39)	2.49 (63)	2.18 (55)	1.52 (39)	1.25 (32)	0.89 (23)	0.86 (22)	18.29 (465)
Average snowfall inches (cm)	12.5 (32)	12.6 (32)	18.5 (47)	20.9 (53)	6.6 (17)	0.2 (0.51)	0.0 (0.0)	0.0 (0.0)	1.6 (4.1)	7.5 (19)	11.1 (28)	14.4 (37)	105.9 (269.61)
Average precipitation days (≥ 0.01 in)	8.5	9.0	10.5	11.6	10.4	9.5	13.4	13.6	9.6	7.6	7.3	8.5	119.5
Average snowy days (≥ 0.1 in)	9.1	9.3	10.0	9.2	3.2	0.1	0.0	0.0	0.5	3.6	7.3	8.8	61.1
Source 1: NOAA
Source 2: National Weather Service (mean maxima and minima 2006–2020)

== Demographics ==
Historical population
Census	Pop.	Note	%±
1870	802		—
1880	3,294		310.7%
1890	1,927		−41.5%
1900	1,418		−26.4%
1910	950		−33.0%
1920	703		−26.0%
1930	303		−56.9%
1940	391		29.0%
1950	329		−15.9%
1960	307		−6.7%
1970	542		76.5%
1980	830		53.1%
1990	891		7.3%
2000	1,088		22.1%
2010	1,034		−5.0%
2020	1,118		8.1%
U.S. Decennial Census

As of the census of 2000, there were 1,088 people, 503 households, and 278 families residing in the town. The population density was 1,146.2 inhabitants per square mile (442.6/km^{2}). There were 670 housing units at an average density of 705.8 units per square mile (272.5 units/km^{2}). The racial makeup of the town was 95.96% White, 0.18% African American, 0.74% Native American, 0.28% Asian, 0.18% Pacific Islander, 1.10% from other races, and 1.56% from two or more races. Hispanic or Latino of any race were 4.41% of the population.

There were 503 households, out of which 24.1% had children under the age of 18 living with them, 44.1% were married couples living together, 8.3% had a female householder with no husband present, and 44.7% were non-families. 34.6% of all households were made up of individuals, and 5.2% had someone living alone who was 65 years of age or older. The average household size was 2.08 and the average family size was 2.67.

In the town, the population was spread out, with 19.0% under the age of 18, 7.9% from 18 to 24, 33.9% from 25 to 44, 31.0% from 45 to 64, and 8.2% who were 65 years of age or older. The median age was 39 years. For every 100 females, there were 109.2 males. For every 100 females age 18 and over, there were 112.3 males.

The median income for a household in the town was $42,969, and the median income for a family was $53,333. Males had a median income of $35,952 versus $28,068 for females. The per capita income for the town was $25,180. About 3.4% of families and 6.2% of the population were below the poverty line, including 7.1% of those under age 18 and 7.0% of those age 65 or over.

== Notable person ==
- Adolphe Gérard (1844–1900), a French chef, restauranteur and owner of the Hotel de Paris in Georgetown, died here.

== See also ==
- 2013 Colorado floods
- Arapaho National Forest
- Georgetown-Silver Plume National Historic District

== Local publication ==
- Historic Georgetown: Centennial Gazette 1868−1968
