= 1984 United States presidential election in Colorado =

- November 6, 1984

| Nominee | Ronald Reagan | Walter Mondale |
| Party | Republican | Democratic |
| Home state | California | Minnesota |
| Running mate | George H. W. Bush | Geraldine Ferraro |
| Electoral vote | 8 | 0 |
| Popular vote | 821,818 | 454,974 |
| Percentage | 63.44% | 35.12% |
County results
Reagan
40–50%
50–60%
60–70%
70–80%
80–90%
Mondale
40–50%
50–60%
60–70%
President before election
Ronald Reagan
Republican
Elected President
Ronald Reagan
Republican

The 1984 United States presidential election in Colorado took place on November 6, 1984. All 50 states and the District of Columbia, were part of the 1984 United States presidential election. State voters chose eight electors to the Electoral College, which selected the president and vice president of the United States. Colorado was won by incumbent United States President Ronald Reagan of California, who was running against former Vice President Walter Mondale of Minnesota. Reagan ran for a second time with incumbent Vice President and former C.I.A. Director George H. W. Bush of Texas, and Mondale ran with Representative Geraldine Ferraro of New York, the first major female candidate for the vice presidency.

The presidential election of 1984 was a very partisan election for Colorado, with over 98% of the electorate voting for either the Democratic or Republican parties, though several parties appeared on the ballot. All but two counties gave either Reagan or Mondale an outright majority, the two exceptions being Huerfano (which gave Mondale a plurality) and Lake (which gave Reagan a plurality).

Reagan did best in Rio Blanco County, and Mondale did the best in Costilla County, along the Southern Rockies. As of the 2024 presidential election, this is the last election in which Adams County, Boulder County, Gilpin County, Lake County, Pitkin County, Saguache County, and San Miguel County voted for a Republican presidential candidate. This was the last election until 2020, won by Democrat Joe Biden, in which Colorado was decided by double digits. This election remains the last time Colorado voted to the right of Texas.

Reagan won Colorado by a landslide margin of 28.3%, a little more than 10% in excess of his national 18.2% margin. His 63.4% vote share made the Columbine State Reagan's 15th-best in the nation. This was typical for Colorado at the time, as the Mountain West in general had trended toward being a Republican bastion since 1952. Gerald Ford had carried Colorado by a double-digit margin amid his narrow national defeat in 1976. Reagan performed strongly throughout rural Colorado outside the Southern Rockies, along the border with northern New Mexico; not only did he carry a vast majority of Colorado's counties, but he exceeded 60% in a majority of them. However, particularly important for the strength of his win was his strong showing in the state's second and third-largest counties, the Denver-area suburban counties of Jefferson and Arapahoe, in both of which he exceeded two-thirds of the vote.

There were few signs of any shakiness of the Republican strength in Colorado; Reagan even carried Pitkin County, the one county in the state that had switched from Nixon in 1968 to McGovern in 1972. Like several Mountain West states, Colorado was weaker than usual for the Republican Party in 1988, but would rebound to being sufficiently red to vote for Dole in 1996. The beginnings of Colorado's slide toward swing-state status, which would materialize in 2008, could, however, be seen in the ongoing weakening of Republican strength in Boulder County, one of the state's larger counties and at the time a traditionally Republican county. Reagan carried the county with 55.1%, substantially less than his national vote share; in 1976, Ford had carried it with 52.7%, 4.7% in excess of his national vote share. In 1968, Nixon received 57.7% of the county's vote; and in 1960, 61.5%.

Another sign was the city-county of Denver switching from Reagan in 1980 to Mondale in 1984, despite Reagan running considerably stronger nationally in 1984 than in 1980. Denver was not strongly Democratic at the time; it voted for Kennedy and Carter only very narrowly in the nationally close elections of 1960 and 1976, respectively. In 1980, it had given Reagan a 42.2%-41.0% plurality (with John Anderson scoring a strong 13.7%). Republican fortunes in Denver and Boulder County steadily continued to sink after 1984, which was, as of 2024, the last election in which the Republican would stay above 40% in the former or carry the latter.

== Results ==
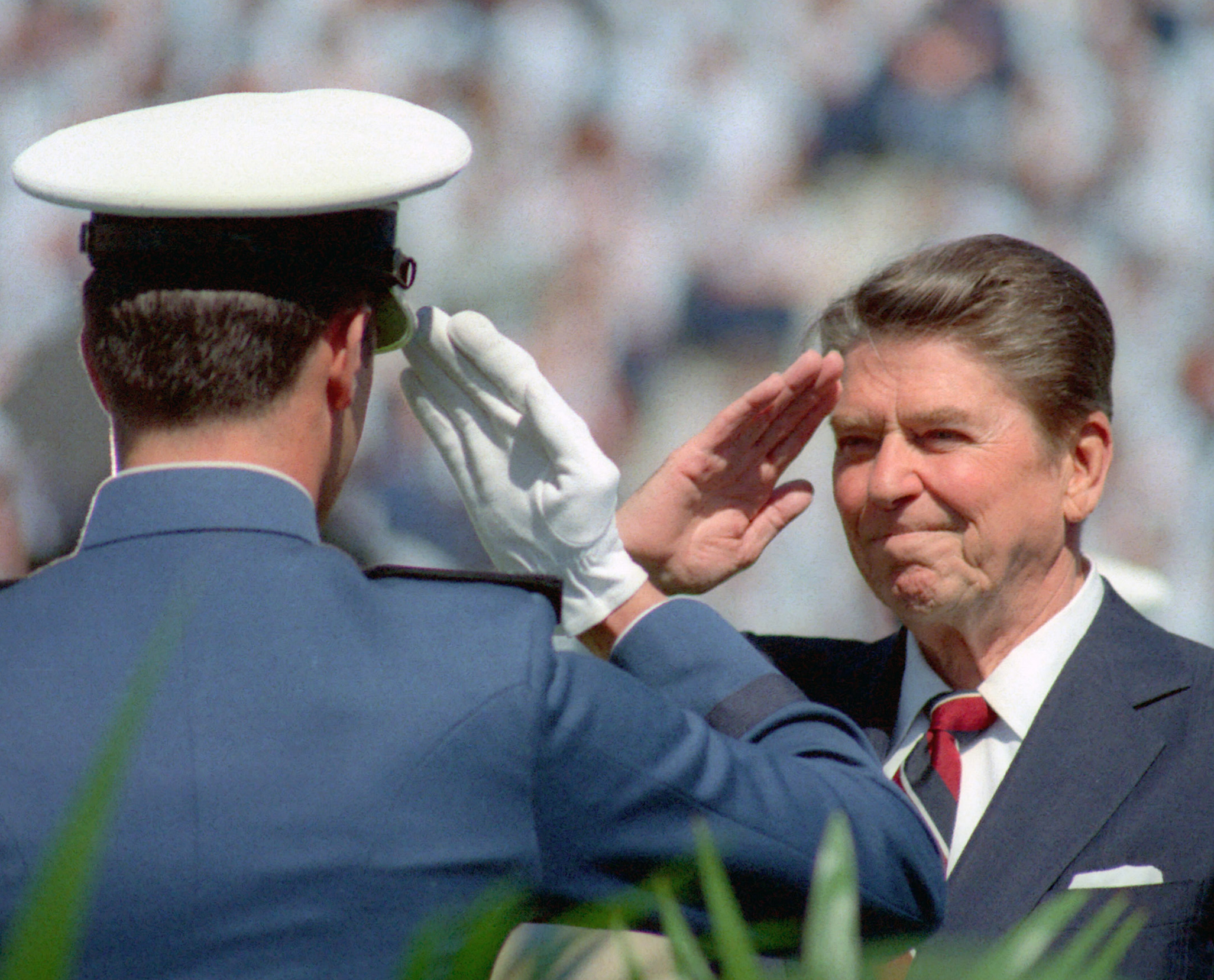
On the campaign trail, President Reagan is welcomed at the graduation commencement for the United States Air Force Academy, in Colorado Springs, Colorado. May, 1984.

1984 United States presidential election in Colorado
| Party | Candidate | Votes | Percentage | Electoral votes |
|---|---|---|---|---|
| Republican | Ronald Reagan (incumbent) | 821,818 | 63.44% | 8 |
| Democratic | Walter Mondale | 454,974 | 35.12% | 0 |
| Libertarian | David Bergland | 11,257 | 0.87% | 0 |
| Independent | Lyndon LaRouche | 4,662 | 0.36% | 0 |
| New Alliance Party | Dennis Serrette | 978 | 0.08% | 0 |
| Prohibition | Earl Dodge | 859 | 0.07% | 0 |
| Socialist Workers Party | Melvin Mason | 810 | 0.06% | 0 |
| Write-Ins | | 23 | >0.01% | 0 |
| Totals | | 1,295,381 | 100.0% | 8 |

=== By county ===
| County | Ronald Reagan Republican | | Walter Mondale Democratic | | Various candidates Other parties | | Margin | | Total votes cast |
| County | # | % | # | % | # | % | # | % | Total votes cast |
|---|---|---|---|---|---|---|---|---|---|
| Adams | 55,092 | 60.20% | 35,285 | 38.56% | 1,134 | 1.24% | 19,807 | 21.64% | 91,511 |
| Alamosa | 2,953 | 62.68% | 1,720 | 36.51% | 38 | 0.81% | 1,233 | 26.17% | 4,711 |
| Arapahoe | 107,556 | 71.92% | 39,891 | 26.67% | 2,107 | 1.41% | 67,665 | 45.25% | 149,554 |
| Archuleta | 1,557 | 71.98% | 584 | 27.00% | 22 | 1.02% | 973 | 44.98% | 2,163 |
| Baca | 1,903 | 75.85% | 580 | 23.12% | 26 | 1.03% | 1,323 | 52.73% | 2,509 |
| Bent | 1,314 | 59.75% | 859 | 39.06% | 26 | 1.19% | 455 | 20.69% | 2,199 |
| Boulder | 53,535 | 55.06% | 42,195 | 43.40% | 1,493 | 1.54% | 11,340 | 11.66% | 97,223 |
| Chaffee | 3,680 | 66.31% | 1,779 | 32.05% | 91 | 1.64% | 1,901 | 34.26% | 5,550 |
| Cheyenne | 892 | 73.23% | 307 | 25.21% | 19 | 1.56% | 585 | 48.02% | 1,218 |
| Clear Creek | 2,151 | 65.34% | 1,089 | 33.08% | 52 | 1.58% | 1,062 | 32.26% | 3,292 |
| Conejos | 1,669 | 51.40% | 1,553 | 47.83% | 25 | 0.77% | 116 | 3.57% | 3,247 |
| Costilla | 621 | 38.07% | 997 | 61.13% | 13 | 0.80% | -376 | -23.06% | 1,631 |
| Crowley | 993 | 65.03% | 517 | 33.86% | 17 | 1.11% | 476 | 31.17% | 1,527 |
| Custer | 832 | 76.12% | 241 | 22.05% | 20 | 1.83% | 591 | 54.07% | 1,093 |
| Delta | 6,678 | 69.28% | 2,835 | 29.41% | 126 | 1.31% | 3,843 | 39.87% | 9,639 |
| Denver | 105,096 | 47.83% | 110,200 | 50.15% | 4,442 | 2.02% | -5,104 | -2.32% | 219,738 |
| Dolores | 667 | 78.47% | 173 | 20.35% | 10 | 1.18% | 494 | 58.12% | 850 |
| Douglas | 12,249 | 79.33% | 3,011 | 19.50% | 181 | 1.17% | 9,238 | 59.83% | 15,441 |
| Eagle | 4,500 | 67.84% | 2,032 | 30.63% | 101 | 1.53% | 2,468 | 37.21% | 6,633 |
| El Paso | 88,377 | 75.04% | 28,185 | 23.93% | 1,210 | 1.03% | 60,192 | 51.11% | 117,772 |
| Elbert | 2,605 | 75.27% | 802 | 23.17% | 54 | 1.56% | 1,803 | 52.10% | 3,461 |
| Fremont | 8,250 | 67.31% | 3,895 | 31.78% | 111 | 0.91% | 4,355 | 35.53% | 12,256 |
| Garfield | 7,111 | 69.14% | 3,076 | 29.91% | 98 | 0.95% | 4,035 | 39.23% | 10,285 |
| Gilpin | 896 | 57.03% | 634 | 40.36% | 41 | 2.61% | 262 | 16.67% | 1,571 |
| Grand | 2,865 | 72.72% | 1,017 | 25.81% | 58 | 1.47% | 1,848 | 46.91% | 3,940 |
| Gunnison | 3,100 | 67.32% | 1,424 | 30.92% | 81 | 1.76% | 1,676 | 36.40% | 4,605 |
| Hinsdale | 310 | 74.88% | 98 | 23.67% | 6 | 1.45% | 212 | 51.21% | 414 |
| Huerfano | 1,581 | 49.04% | 1,602 | 49.69% | 41 | 1.27% | -21 | -0.65% | 3,224 |
| Jackson | 722 | 78.22% | 191 | 20.69% | 10 | 1.09% | 531 | 57.53% | 923 |
| Jefferson | 124,496 | 68.92% | 53,700 | 29.73% | 2,432 | 1.35% | 70,796 | 39.19% | 180,628 |
| Kiowa | 850 | 75.22% | 265 | 23.45% | 15 | 1.33% | 585 | 51.77% | 1,130 |
| Kit Carson | 2,762 | 77.06% | 778 | 21.71% | 44 | 1.23% | 1,984 | 55.35% | 3,584 |
| La Plata | 8,719 | 67.49% | 4,040 | 31.27% | 159 | 1.24% | 4,679 | 36.22% | 12,918 |
| Lake | 1,364 | 49.65% | 1,324 | 48.20% | 59 | 2.15% | 40 | 1.45% | 2,747 |
| Larimer | 49,883 | 66.65% | 23,896 | 31.93% | 1,069 | 1.42% | 25,987 | 34.72% | 74,848 |
| Las Animas | 2,992 | 44.38% | 3,670 | 54.43% | 80 | 1.19% | -678 | -10.05% | 6,742 |
| Lincoln | 1,661 | 72.91% | 587 | 25.77% | 30 | 1.32% | 1,074 | 47.14% | 2,278 |
| Logan | 5,883 | 72.33% | 2,155 | 26.50% | 95 | 1.17% | 3,728 | 45.83% | 8,133 |
| Mesa | 23,736 | 69.66% | 9,938 | 29.17% | 400 | 1.17% | 13,798 | 40.49% | 34,074 |
| Mineral | 333 | 72.55% | 117 | 25.49% | 9 | 1.96% | 216 | 47.06% | 459 |
| Moffat | 3,630 | 72.88% | 1,228 | 24.65% | 123 | 2.47% | 2,402 | 48.23% | 4,981 |
| Montezuma | 4,753 | 73.06% | 1,665 | 25.59% | 88 | 1.35% | 3,088 | 47.47% | 6,506 |
| Montrose | 7,162 | 70.40% | 2,864 | 28.15% | 147 | 1.45% | 4,298 | 42.25% | 10,173 |
| Morgan | 6,097 | 71.26% | 2,331 | 27.24% | 128 | 1.50% | 3,766 | 44.02% | 8,556 |
| Otero | 5,373 | 62.37% | 3,005 | 34.88% | 237 | 2.75% | 2,368 | 27.49% | 8,615 |
| Ouray | 914 | 70.85% | 366 | 28.37% | 10 | 0.78% | 548 | 42.48% | 1,290 |
| Park | 2,041 | 70.33% | 782 | 26.95% | 79 | 2.72% | 1,259 | 43.38% | 2,902 |
| Phillips | 1,689 | 71.36% | 651 | 27.50% | 27 | 1.14% | 1,038 | 43.86% | 2,367 |
| Pitkin | 3,117 | 56.39% | 2,293 | 41.48% | 118 | 2.13% | 824 | 14.91% | 5,528 |
| Prowers | 3,501 | 68.71% | 1,467 | 28.79% | 127 | 2.50% | 2,034 | 39.92% | 5,095 |
| Pueblo | 24,634 | 47.19% | 27,126 | 51.97% | 440 | 0.84% | -2,492 | -4.76% | 52,200 |
| Rio Blanco | 2,131 | 80.81% | 484 | 18.35% | 22 | 0.84% | 1,647 | 62.46% | 2,637 |
| Rio Grande | 3,122 | 73.25% | 1,104 | 25.90% | 36 | 0.85% | 2,018 | 47.35% | 4,262 |
| Routt | 4,239 | 66.15% | 2,051 | 32.01% | 118 | 1.84% | 2,188 | 34.14% | 6,408 |
| Saguache | 1,201 | 57.63% | 867 | 41.60% | 16 | 0.77% | 334 | 16.03% | 2,084 |
| San Juan | 320 | 61.66% | 183 | 35.26% | 16 | 3.08% | 137 | 26.40% | 519 |
| San Miguel | 833 | 54.77% | 654 | 43.00% | 34 | 2.23% | 179 | 11.77% | 1,521 |
| Sedgwick | 1,146 | 72.39% | 429 | 27.10% | 8 | 0.51% | 717 | 45.29% | 1,583 |
| Summit | 3,253 | 66.14% | 1,588 | 32.29% | 77 | 1.57% | 1,665 | 33.85% | 4,918 |
| Teller | 3,460 | 75.84% | 1,043 | 22.86% | 59 | 1.30% | 2,417 | 52.98% | 4,562 |
| Washington | 2,080 | 77.50% | 568 | 21.16% | 36 | 1.34% | 1,512 | 56.34% | 2,684 |
| Weld | 31,293 | 68.51% | 13,863 | 30.35% | 523 | 1.14% | 17,430 | 38.16% | 45,679 |
| Yuma | 3,394 | 74.32% | 1,121 | 24.55% | 52 | 1.13% | 2,273 | 49.77% | 4,567 |
| Total | 821,818 | 63.44% | 454,974 | 35.12% | 18,589 | 1.44% | 366,844 | 28.32% | 1,295,381 |

==== Counties that flipped from Republican to Democratic ====
- Denver

=== By congressional district ===
Reagan won five of six congressional districts, including one held by a Democrat.

| District | Reagan | Mondale | Representative |
|---|---|---|---|
| 1st | 48% | 52% | Pat Schroeder |
| 2nd | 61% | 39% | Tim Wirth |
| 3rd | 63% | 37% | Ray Kogovsek |
| 3rd | 63% | 37% | Scott McInnis |
| 4th | 68% | 32% | Hank Brown |
| 5th | 75% | 25% | Ken Kramer |
| 6th | 69% | 31% | Daniel Schaefer |

== See also ==
- Presidency of Ronald Reagan
