= Slick Rock, Colorado =

Unincorporated community in San Miguel County, CO, USA

- Unincorporated community
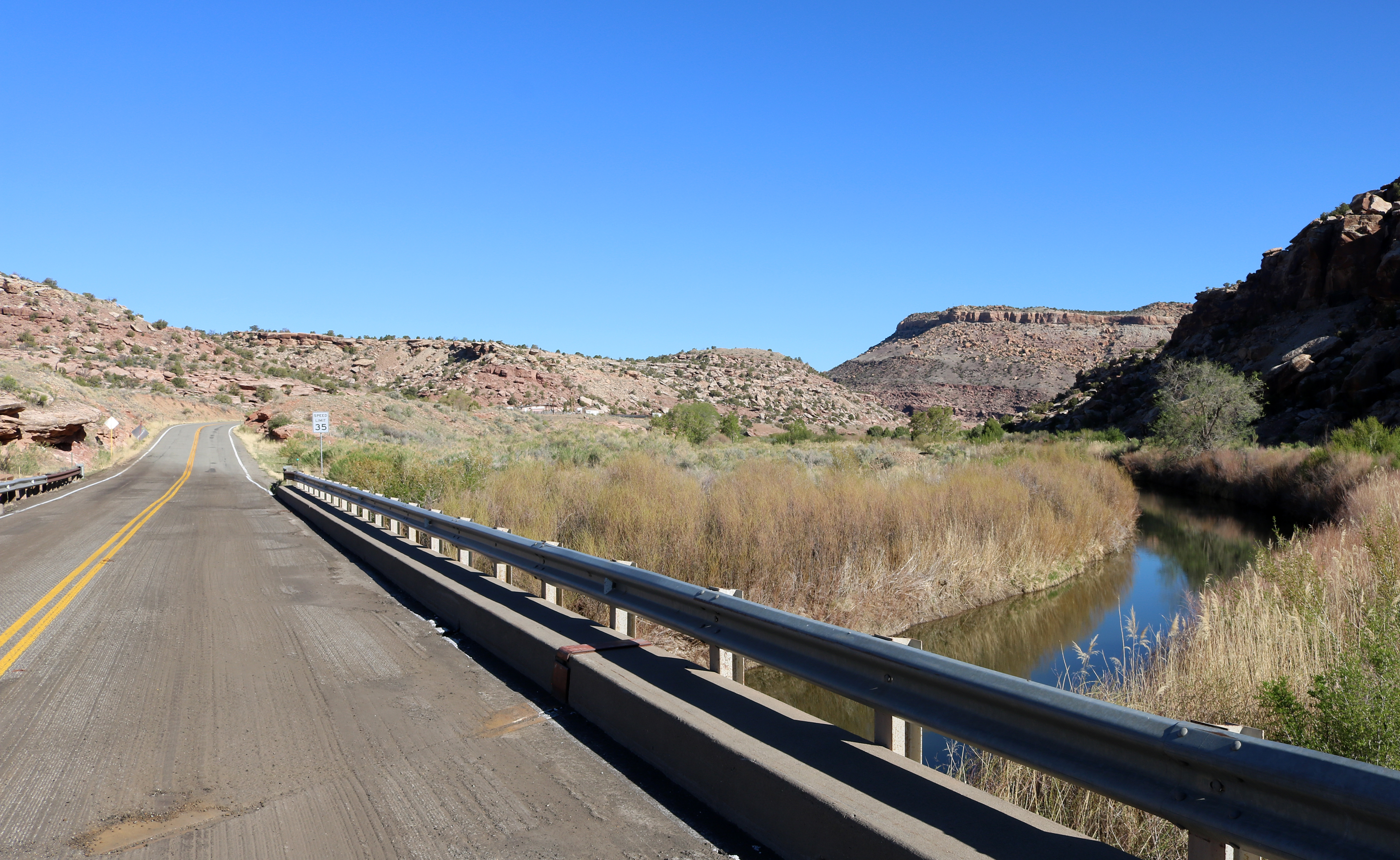
- Dolores River with Slick Rock in distance.

- Location of Slick Rock in the State of Colorado
- Coordinates: 38°02′34″N 108°53′19″W
- Country: United States
- State: Colorado
- County: San Miguel County

Government
  - Type: unincorporated community
- Elevation: 5,540 ft (1,690 m)
- Time zone: UTC-7 (MST)
  - Summer (DST): UTC-6 (MDT)
- ZIP Code: 80325
- Area codes: 970

Slick Rock is an unincorporated community located in western San Miguel County, Colorado, United States. Slick Rock sits next to the Dolores River and is named for the surrounding sandstone formations.

== History ==
Slick Rock was originally known as Gladel. The Gladel post office opened in 1922, but closed in 1929. The Slick Rock post office opened in 1941, but has since closed. Slick Rock addresses are now served by the Egnar post office with the ZIP code 81325.

== See also ==
- List of places in Colorado
