= 1976 United States presidential election in Colorado =

- November 2, 1976

Nominee	Gerald Ford	Jimmy Carter
Party	Republican	Democratic
Home state	Michigan	Georgia
Running mate	Bob Dole	Walter Mondale
Electoral vote	7	0
Popular vote	584,367	460,353
Percentage	54.05%	42.58%
County results
Ford
40–50%
50–60%
60–70%
Carter
40–50%
50–60%
60–70%
70–80%
President before election
Gerald Ford
Republican
Elected President
Jimmy Carter
Democratic

The 1976 United States presidential election in Colorado took place on November 2, 1976, as part of the 1976 United States presidential election. Voters chose seven representatives, or electors, to the Electoral College, who voted for president and vice president.

Colorado was won by incumbent President Gerald Ford (R–Michigan) with 54.05% of the popular vote, against Jimmy Carter (D–Georgia), with 42.58% of the popular vote. Like most of the Mountain West, Colorado was comfortably in Ford's column; Colorado was Ford's ninth-best state overall (and one of only nine which he won by double digits). Ford held Carter's margin in the city of Denver to 2.8%, and rolled up large margins in the reliably Republican suburban Denver-area counties of Jefferson and Arapahoe. He also ran well in Boulder County, at the time a traditionally Republican county; he would be the last Republican apart from Reagan in his 1984 landslide to win a majority in the county. Despite the large national swing in favor of the Democrats, Ford even took back Pitkin County, which had supported McGovern in 1972.

Nevertheless, Carter showed some strength in some rural parts of Colorado that later Democrats would fail to replicate. As of the 2024 presidential election, this was the last occasion on which Dolores County, Prowers County, Phillips County, and Cheyenne County voted for a Democratic presidential candidate.

None of the third-party candidates amounted to a significant portion of the vote, but Eugene McCarthy (I–Minnesota) won 2.41% of the popular vote, proportionally significantly ahead of his national 0.91%. This was the first presidential election in which Colorado recorded one million votes.

Despite losing in Colorado, Carter went on to win the national election and became the 39th president of the United States. Colorado had previously voted Republican fifteen times, Democratic nine times, and Populist once (for James B. Weaver in 1892).

Lucretia Potts, Jeanne Meyer, Kay Johnson, Sheldon Sheperd, Fern Wolaver, Martyn Butler, and Clyde Kissinger served as Republican presidential electors.

== Results ==
1976 United States presidential election in Colorado
Party	Candidate	Votes	%
Republican	Gerald Ford (inc.)	584,367	54.05%
Democratic	Jimmy Carter	460,353	42.58%
Independent	Eugene McCarthy	26,107	2.41%
Libertarian	Roger MacBride	5,330	0.49%
Colorado Prohibition	Benjamin Bubar	2,882	0.27%
Socialist Labor	Peter Camejo	1,126	0.10%
U.S. Labor	Lyndon LaRouche	567	0.05%
Communist	Gus Hall	403	0.04%
Total votes		1,081,135	100%

=== By county ===
County	Gerald Ford Republican		Jimmy Carter Democratic		Eugene McCarthy Independent		Roger MacBride Libertarian		Various candidates Other parties		Margin		Total votes cast
County	#	%	#	%	#	%	#	%	#	%	#	%	Total votes cast
Adams	35,392	45.30%	40,551	51.90%	1,618	2.07%	416	0.53%	150	0.19%	-5,159	-6.60%	78,127
Alamosa	2,599	53.51%	2,052	42.25%	179	3.69%	15	0.31%	12	0.25%	547	11.26%	4,857
Arapahoe	63,154	63.45%	33,685	33.85%	1,748	1.76%	449	0.45%	490	0.49%	29,469	29.60%	99,526
Archuleta	768	53.63%	632	44.13%	29	2.03%	1	0.07%	2	0.14%	136	9.50%	1,432
Baca	1,303	51.97%	1,164	46.43%	28	1.12%	10	0.40%	2	0.08%	139	5.54%	2,507
Bent	1,156	46.61%	1,268	51.13%	39	1.57%	4	0.16%	13	0.52%	-112	-4.52%	2,480
Boulder	42,830	52.71%	33,284	40.96%	4,252	5.23%	558	0.69%	329	0.40%	9,546	11.75%	81,253
Chaffee	2,925	56.66%	2,064	39.98%	118	2.29%	18	0.35%	37	0.72%	861	16.68%	5,162
Cheyenne	610	48.15%	625	49.33%	22	1.74%	8	0.63%	2	0.16%	-15	-1.18%	1,267
Clear Creek	1,477	55.36%	1,069	40.07%	80	3.00%	9	0.34%	33	1.24%	408	15.29%	2,668
Conejos	1,426	44.65%	1,698	53.16%	45	1.41%	7	0.22%	18	0.56%	-272	-8.51%	3,194
Costilla	392	26.96%	1,033	71.05%	16	1.10%	2	0.14%	11	0.76%	-641	-44.09%	1,454
Crowley	834	54.90%	667	43.91%	14	0.92%	2	0.13%	2	0.13%	167	10.99%	1,519
Custer	491	62.39%	259	32.91%	27	3.43%	7	0.89%	3	0.38%	232	29.48%	787
Delta	4,980	58.82%	3,232	38.17%	194	2.29%	35	0.41%	26	0.31%	1,748	20.65%	8,467
Denver	105,960	46.73%	112,229	49.50%	5,386	2.38%	1,105	0.49%	2,058	0.91%	-6,269	-2.77%	226,738
Dolores	343	45.61%	374	49.73%	26	3.46%	6	0.80%	3	0.40%	-31	-4.12%	752
Douglas	5,078	65.54%	2,459	31.74%	162	2.09%	38	0.49%	11	0.14%	2,619	33.80%	7,748
Eagle	2,963	64.18%	1,502	32.53%	111	2.40%	34	0.74%	7	0.15%	1,461	31.65%	4,617
El Paso	50,929	59.13%	32,911	38.21%	1,574	1.83%	530	0.62%	186	0.22%	18,018	20.92%	86,130
Elbert	1,279	52.72%	1,068	44.02%	64	2.64%	13	0.54%	2	0.08%	211	8.70%	2,426
Fremont	5,647	52.44%	4,886	45.38%	174	1.62%	29	0.27%	32	0.30%	761	7.06%	10,768
Garfield	4,699	59.74%	2,852	36.26%	223	2.83%	41	0.52%	51	0.65%	1,847	23.48%	7,866
Gilpin	451	41.19%	563	51.42%	59	5.39%	14	1.28%	8	0.73%	-112	-10.23%	1,095
Grand	1,703	61.77%	910	33.01%	113	4.10%	22	0.80%	9	0.33%	793	28.76%	2,757
Gunnison	2,568	61.88%	1,250	30.12%	260	6.27%	30	0.72%	42	1.01%	1,318	31.76%	4,150
Hinsdale	189	66.55%	83	29.23%	11	3.87%	1	0.35%	0	0.00%	106	37.32%	284
Huerfano	1,182	37.35%	1,932	61.04%	38	1.20%	7	0.22%	6	0.19%	-750	-23.69%	3,165
Jackson	455	60.83%	279	37.30%	14	1.87%	0	0.00%	0	0.00%	176	23.53%	748
Jefferson	87,080	60.44%	52,782	36.64%	3,141	2.18%	770	0.53%	300	0.21%	34,298	23.80%	144,073
Kiowa	598	52.59%	529	46.53%	8	0.70%	1	0.09%	1	0.09%	69	6.06%	1,137
Kit Carson	1,888	52.28%	1,647	45.61%	59	1.63%	10	0.28%	7	0.19%	241	6.67%	3,611
La Plata	6,228	59.05%	3,843	36.44%	312	2.96%	65	0.62%	99	0.94%	2,385	22.61%	10,547
Lake	1,575	48.03%	1,549	47.24%	89	2.71%	26	0.79%	40	1.22%	26	0.79%	3,279
Larimer	32,169	60.72%	19,005	35.87%	1,356	2.56%	297	0.56%	156	0.29%	13,164	24.85%	52,983
Las Animas	2,615	36.45%	4,459	62.15%	82	1.14%	8	0.11%	11	0.15%	-1,844	-25.70%	7,175
Lincoln	1,276	53.46%	1,059	44.37%	47	1.97%	4	0.17%	1	0.04%	217	9.09%	2,387
Logan	4,256	53.32%	3,543	44.39%	140	1.75%	22	0.28%	21	0.26%	713	8.93%	7,982
Mesa	17,924	65.44%	8,807	32.15%	541	1.98%	74	0.27%	44	0.16%	9,117	33.29%	27,390
Mineral	235	55.56%	167	39.48%	20	4.73%	1	0.24%	0	0.00%	68	16.08%	423
Moffat	2,099	55.68%	1,451	38.49%	120	3.18%	30	0.80%	70	1.86%	648	17.19%	3,770
Montezuma	3,002	57.99%	1,993	38.50%	152	2.94%	20	0.39%	10	0.19%	1,009	19.49%	5,177
Montrose	4,838	58.42%	3,164	38.20%	220	2.66%	19	0.23%	41	0.50%	1,674	20.22%	8,282
Morgan	4,603	53.34%	3,798	44.01%	136	1.58%	20	0.23%	72	0.83%	805	9.33%	8,629
Otero	4,597	51.54%	4,118	46.17%	72	0.81%	19	0.21%	114	1.28%	479	5.37%	8,920
Ouray	645	62.50%	333	32.27%	49	4.75%	4	0.39%	1	0.10%	312	30.23%	1,032
Park	1,034	55.24%	741	39.58%	67	3.58%	13	0.69%	17	0.91%	293	15.66%	1,872
Phillips	1,142	48.12%	1,173	49.43%	48	2.02%	7	0.29%	3	0.13%	-31	-1.31%	2,373
Pitkin	2,955	53.61%	2,194	39.80%	304	5.52%	46	0.83%	13	0.24%	761	13.81%	5,512
Prowers	2,578	46.13%	2,861	51.20%	57	1.02%	9	0.16%	83	1.49%	-283	-5.07%	5,588
Pueblo	18,518	41.06%	25,841	57.29%	568	1.26%	120	0.27%	56	0.12%	-7,323	-16.23%	45,103
Rio Blanco	1,439	67.24%	627	29.30%	57	2.66%	13	0.61%	4	0.19%	812	37.94%	2,140
Rio Grande	2,627	62.37%	1,475	35.02%	88	2.09%	14	0.33%	8	0.19%	1,152	27.35%	4,212
Routt	2,822	54.13%	2,130	40.86%	213	4.09%	39	0.75%	9	0.17%	692	13.27%	5,213
Saguache	1,094	49.50%	1,059	47.92%	51	2.31%	1	0.05%	5	0.23%	35	1.58%	2,210
San Juan	221	53.77%	167	40.63%	21	5.11%	1	0.24%	1	0.24%	54	13.14%	411
San Miguel	622	43.83%	674	47.50%	106	7.47%	14	0.99%	3	0.21%	-52	-3.67%	1,419
Sedgwick	902	53.06%	773	45.47%	21	1.24%	3	0.18%	1	0.06%	129	7.59%	1,700
Summit	1,826	58.15%	1,087	34.62%	166	5.29%	36	1.15%	25	0.80%	739	23.53%	3,140
Teller	1,410	55.93%	986	39.11%	94	3.73%	24	0.95%	7	0.28%	424	16.82%	2,521
Washington	1,440	52.63%	1,211	44.26%	61	2.23%	16	0.58%	8	0.29%	229	8.37%	2,736
Weld	21,976	55.35%	16,501	41.56%	922	2.32%	153	0.39%	150	0.38%	5,475	13.79%	39,702
Yuma	2,350	52.20%	2,025	44.98%	95	2.11%	23	0.51%	9	0.20%	325	7.22%	4,502
Total	584,367	54.05%	460,353	42.58%	26,107	2.41%	5,330	0.49%	4,978	0.46%	124,014	11.47%	1,081,135

==== Counties that flipped from Republican to Democratic ====
- Gilpin
- Heurfano
- Las Animas
- Pueblo
- Conejos
- Adams
- Prowers
- Bent
- Dolores
- San Miguel
- Phillips
- Cheyenne
- Denver

==== Counties that flipped from Democratic to Republican ====
- Pitkin

=== Results by congressional district ===
President Ford won four out of five of the congressional districts in Colorado. President Carter won the 1st Congressional district in Colorado by a margin of 41 votes or 93,764 to 93,723.

District	Ford		Carter	
District	#	%	#	%
1st	93,723	50%	93,764	50%
2nd	137,501	57.8%	100,538	42.2%
3rd	88,106	51%	84,783	49%
4th	130,713	58.4%	93,021	41.6%
5th	124,534	58.4%	82,313	41.6%
