= San Miguel County, Colorado =

County in Colorado, United States

- County
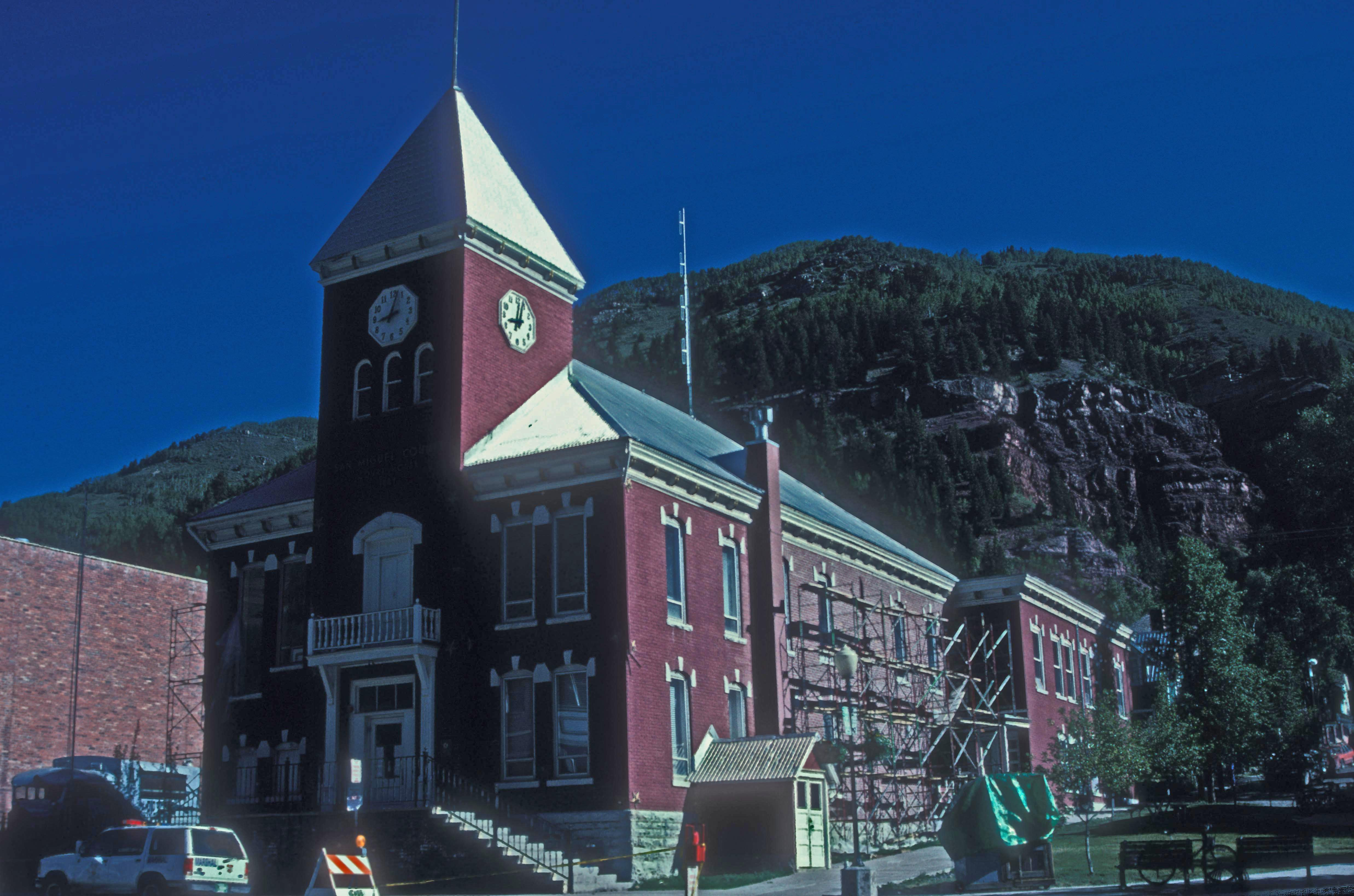
- The San Miguel County Courthouse

- Location within the U.S. state of Colorado
- Coordinates: 38.01°N 108.43°W
- Country: United States
- State: Colorado
- Founded: March 2, 1883
- Named for: San Miguel River
- Seat: Telluride
- Largest town: Telluride

Area
  - Total: 1,289 sq mi (3,340 km^{2})
  - Land: 1,287 sq mi (3,330 km^{2})
  - Water: 2.0 sq mi (5.2 km^{2}) 0.2%

Population (2020)
  - Total: 8,072
  - Estimate (2025): 7,753 ▼
  - Density: 6.272/sq mi (2.422/km^{2})
- Time zone: UTC−7 (Mountain)
  - Summer (DST): UTC−6 (MDT)
- Congressional district: 3rd
- Website: www.sanmiguelcountyco.gov

San Miguel County is a county located in the U.S. state of Colorado. As of the 2020 census, the population was 8,072. The county seat is Telluride. The county is named for the San Miguel River.

== History ==
San Miguel County was given the Spanish language name for "Saint Michael" due to the nearby San Miguel River. On February 27, 1883, Ouray County was split to form San Miguel County. Originally the San Miguel County portion was to retain the name Ouray County with the new portion called Uncompahgre County.

Mining operators in the San Juan mountain area of Colorado formed the San Juan District Mining Association (SJDMA) in 1903, as a direct result of a Western Federation of Miners proposal to the Telluride Mining Association for the eight-hour day, which had been approved in a referendum by 72 percent of Colorado voters. The new association consolidated the power of thirty-six mining properties in San Miguel, Ouray, and San Juan counties. The SJDMA refused to consider any reduction in hours or increase in wages, helping to provoke a bitter strike.

In 1875, the Smuggler gold vein was discovered near Telluride. The Smuggler-Union, Tomboy, and Liberty Bell mines combined produced over a hundred tons of gold by 1920, third in the state of Colorado.

== Geography ==
According to the U.S. Census Bureau, the county has a total area of 1,289 square miles (3,340 km^{2}), of which 1,287 square miles (3,330 km^{2}) is land and 2.0 square miles (5.2 km^{2}) (0.2%) is water.

=== Adjacent counties ===
- Montrose County - north
- Ouray County - east
- San Juan County - southeast
- Dolores County - south
- San Juan County, Utah - west

=== Major highways ===
- State Highway 62
- State Highway 141
- State Highway 145

=== National protected areas ===
- Lizard Head Wilderness
- Mount Sneffels Wilderness
- Old Spanish National Historic Trail
- Telluride National Historic District
- Uncompahgre National Forest

=== Trails and byways ===
- Great Parks Bicycle Route
- San Juan Skyway National Scenic Byway
- Unaweep/Tabeguache Scenic and Historic Byway
- Western Express Bicycle Route

== Demographics ==
Historical population
Census	Pop.	Note	%±
1890	2,909		—
1900	5,379		84.9%
1910	4,700		−12.6%
1920	5,281		12.4%
1930	2,184		−58.6%
1940	3,664		67.8%
1950	2,693		−26.5%
1960	2,944		9.3%
1970	1,949		−33.8%
1980	3,192		63.8%
1990	3,653		14.4%
2000	6,594		80.5%
2010	7,359		11.6%
2020	8,072		9.7%
2025 (est.)	7,753	▼	−4.0%
U.S. Decennial Census; 1790-1960 1900-1990; 1990-2000 2010-2020

=== 2020 census ===
As of the 2020 census, the county had a population of 8,072. Of the residents, 19.3% were under the age of 18 and 14.2% were 65 years of age or older; the median age was 41.0 years. For every 100 females there were 111.9 males, and for every 100 females age 18 and over there were 111.5 males. 56.8% of residents lived in urban areas and 43.2% lived in rural areas.

San Miguel County, Colorado – Racial and ethnic composition Note: the US Census treats Hispanic/Latino as an ethnic category. This table excludes Latinos from the racial categories and assigns them to a separate category. Hispanics/Latinos may be of any race.
Race / Ethnicity (NH = Non-Hispanic)	Pop 2000	Pop 2010	Pop 2020	% 2000	% 2010	% 2020
White alone (NH)	5,959	6,514	6,757	90.37%	88.52%	83.71%
Black or African American alone (NH)	10	19	20	0.15%	0.26%	0.25%
Native American or Alaska Native alone (NH)	49	33	47	0.74%	0.45%	0.58%
Asian alone (NH)	49	52	55	0.74%	0.71%	0.68%
Pacific Islander alone (NH)	4	4	0	0.06%	0.05%	0.00%
Other race alone (NH)	25	8	44	0.38%	0.11%	0.55%
Mixed race or Multiracial (NH)	59	99	267	0.89%	1.35%	3.31%
Hispanic or Latino (any race)	439	630	882	6.66%	8.56%	10.93%
Total	6,594	7,359	8,072	100.00%	100.00%	100.00%

The racial makeup of the county was 85.8% White, 0.3% Black or African American, 1.1% American Indian and Alaska Native, 0.7% Asian, 0.0% Native Hawaiian and Pacific Islander, 4.9% from some other race, and 7.2% from two or more races. Hispanic or Latino residents of any race comprised 10.9% of the population.

There were 3,597 households in the county, of which 26.4% had children under the age of 18 living with them and 22.4% had a female householder with no spouse or partner present. About 32.5% of all households were made up of individuals and 8.3% had someone living alone who was 65 years of age or older.

There were 6,551 housing units, of which 45.1% were vacant. Among occupied housing units, 59.7% were owner-occupied and 40.3% were renter-occupied. The homeowner vacancy rate was 3.3% and the rental vacancy rate was 16.4%.

=== 2000 census ===
At the 2000 census there were 6,594 people, 3,015 households, and 1,423 families living in the county. The population density was 5 people per square mile (1.9 people/km^{2}). There were 5,197 housing units at an average density of 4 units per square mile (1.5 units/km^{2}). The racial makeup of the county was 93.57% White, 0.29% Black or African American, 0.85% Native American, 0.74% Asian, 0.08% Pacific Islander, 3.37% from other races, and 1.11% from two or more races. 8.6% of the population were Hispanic or Latino of any race. Of the 3,015 households 22.80% had children under the age of 18 living with them, 38.30% were married couples living together, 5.40% had a female householder with no husband present, and 52.80% were non-families. 32.70% of households were one person and 2.50% were one person aged 65 or older. The average household size was 2.18 and the average family size was 2.77.

The age distribution was 17.60% under the age of 18, 9.90% from 18 to 24, 43.30% from 25 to 44, 25.80% from 45 to 64, and 3.40% 65 or older. The median age was 34 years. For every 100 females there were 120.80 males. For every 100 females age eighteen 18 and over, there were 126.40 males.

The median household income was $48,514 and the median family income was $60,417. Males had a median income of $35,922 versus $30,278 for females. The per capita income for the county was $35,329. About 6.60% of families and 10.40% of the population were below the poverty line, including 11.10% of those under age 18 and 8.00% of those age 65 or over.

=== Other statistics ===
In June 2021, U.S. News & World Report ranked the San Miguel County as having the best life expectancy in the United States at 100+ years old.

Among all counties in Colorado, San Miguel County has the highest percentage of adults over 25 with at least a bachelor's degree, with 65.2% measured between 2019 and 2023.

== Politics ==
For most of the 20th century, San Miguel County was a national bellwether. It voted for the winner in every presidential election from 1912 to 1984. Since 1988, the county has become one of the most Democratic in Colorado and the nation, largely due to the presence of the Telluride Ski Resort and the influx of liberal-minded voters in the 1960s and 1970s. These trends have made San Miguel similar in vein to other heavily Democratic ski resort counties like Blaine County in Idaho, Teton County in Wyoming, and Pitkin County within Colorado. In the 2000 presidential election, San Miguel County was Green Party candidate Ralph Nader's best countywide performance in the country with 17.2% of the vote.

United States presidential election results for San Miguel County, Colorado
Year	Republican		Democratic		Third party(ies)	
Year	No.	%	No.	%	No.	%
1884	433	54.19%	365	45.68%	1	0.13%
1888	540	57.51%	378	40.26%	21	2.24%
1892	272	23.43%	0	0.00%	889	76.57%
1896	87	3.90%	2,136	95.70%	9	0.40%
1900	717	30.39%	1,604	67.99%	38	1.61%
1904	1,370	61.16%	797	35.58%	73	3.26%
1908	882	45.30%	927	47.61%	138	7.09%
1912	639	30.36%	1,029	48.88%	437	20.76%
1916	578	29.13%	1,325	66.78%	81	4.08%
1920	928	54.30%	688	40.26%	93	5.44%
1924	677	43.62%	567	36.53%	308	19.85%
1928	721	54.91%	554	42.19%	38	2.89%
1932	383	29.74%	862	66.93%	43	3.34%
1936	433	32.12%	860	63.80%	55	4.08%
1940	729	45.94%	851	53.62%	7	0.44%
1944	536	45.69%	630	53.71%	7	0.60%
1948	451	41.80%	613	56.81%	15	1.39%
1952	654	55.19%	524	44.22%	7	0.59%
1956	648	57.86%	469	41.88%	3	0.27%
1960	525	46.09%	612	53.73%	2	0.18%
1964	332	34.23%	636	65.57%	2	0.21%
1968	422	53.22%	311	39.22%	60	7.57%
1972	583	54.95%	426	40.15%	52	4.90%
1976	622	43.83%	674	47.50%	123	8.67%
1980	774	42.79%	651	35.99%	384	21.23%
1984	833	54.77%	654	43.00%	34	2.24%
1988	798	43.39%	961	52.26%	80	4.35%
1992	628	23.58%	1,380	51.82%	655	24.60%
1996	773	28.18%	1,535	55.96%	435	15.86%
2000	1,043	32.04%	1,598	49.09%	614	18.86%
2004	1,079	26.85%	2,876	71.56%	64	1.59%
2008	933	21.45%	3,349	76.99%	68	1.56%
2012	1,154	27.11%	2,992	70.30%	110	2.58%
2016	1,033	23.86%	2,975	68.72%	321	7.42%
2020	1,136	22.07%	3,924	76.24%	87	1.69%
2024	1,154	24.02%	3,529	73.46%	121	2.52%

United States Senate election results for San Miguel County, Colorado2
Year	Republican		Democratic		Third party(ies)	
Year	No.	%	No.	%	No.	%
2020	1,227	23.96%	3,808	74.36%	86	1.68%

United States Senate election results for San Miguel County, Colorado3
Year	Republican		Democratic		Third party(ies)	
Year	No.	%	No.	%	No.	%
2022	888	21.75%	3,110	76.17%	85	2.08%

Colorado Gubernatorial election results for San Miguel County
Year	Republican		Democratic		Third party(ies)	
Year	No.	%	No.	%	No.	%
2022	815	19.95%	3,199	78.29%	72	1.76%

== Communities ==
=== Towns ===
- Mountain Village
- Norwood
- Ophir
- Sawpit
- Telluride (county seat)

=== Census-designated place ===
- Placerville

=== Unincorporated communities ===
- Ames
- Egnar
- Pandora
- Sams
- Slick Rock
- Tomboy (ghost town)

== Education ==
School districts include:

- Telluride School District R-1
- Norwood School District R-2J
- Dolores County School District RE-2

== See also ==
- Bibliography of Colorado
- Geography of Colorado
- History of Colorado
  - National Register of Historic Places listings in San Miguel County, Colorado
- Index of Colorado-related articles
- List of Colorado-related lists
  - List of counties in Colorado
- Outline of Colorado
