= Piñon, Colorado =

Unincorporated area in Montrose County, Colorado

Piñon
- Unincorporated area
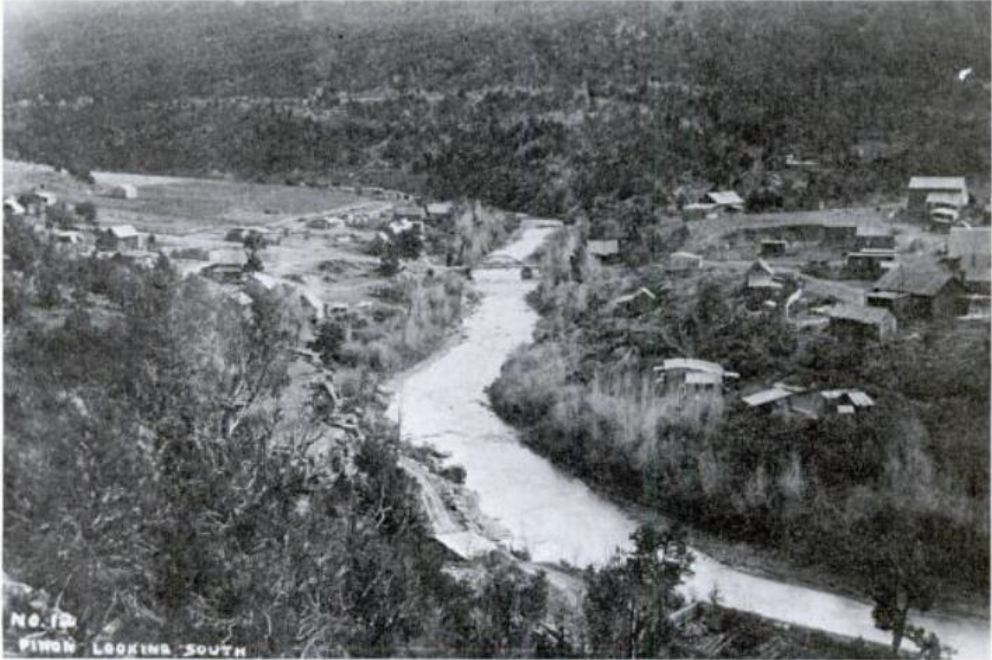
- Piñon townsite on the San Miguel River, looking south, c.1906

- Location within Colorado Location within the United States
- Coordinates: 38°16′00″N 108°24′02″W
- Country: United States
- State: Colorado
- County: Montrose County
- Established: 1896
- Highest elevation: 5,840 ft (1,780 m)
- GNIS feature: 185901

Piñon was a town in Montrose County, Colorado, United States. The town was 58 miles (93 km) south of Grand Junction, Colorado, along the San Miguel River and was created as a colony for the Colorado Cooperative Company. During the height of mining from 1902 to 1904, Piñon was the second largest town in Montrose County. The colony was one of several utopian communities that were established in Colorado during the late 19th century.

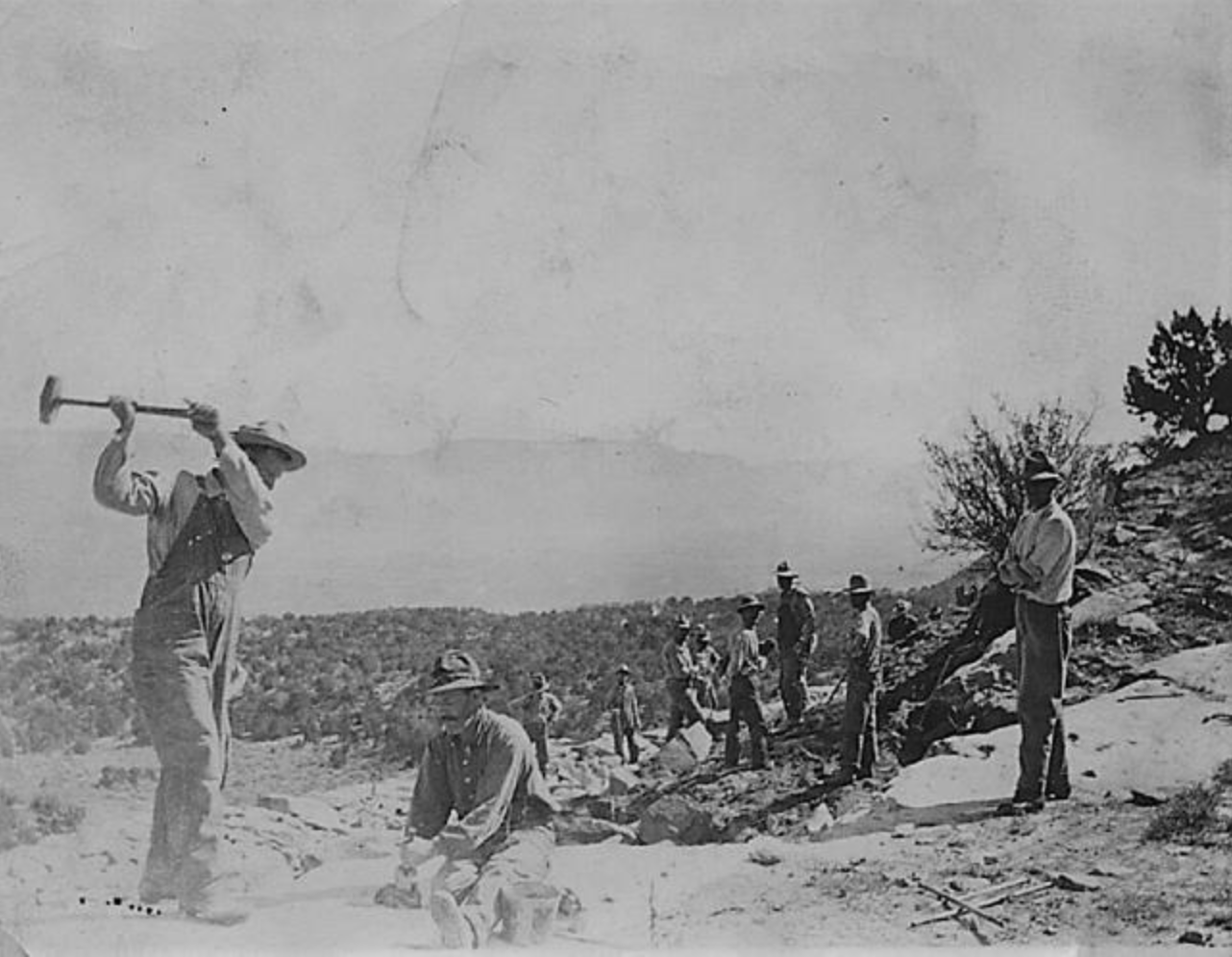
Members of the Colorado Cooperative Co. at work on the colony's irrigation ditch, circa 1900

The community's people and infrastructure largely displaced to nearby Nucla in the early 20th century.

== History ==
In 1894, the Colorado Cooperative Company created a town for its members. Paul O'Rourke writes in his book Frontier in Transition: A History of Southwestern Colorado, that the company was conceived as a "utopian enterprise" based on the notion of "equality and service, rather than greed and competition, were the bases of conduct." Piñon grew out of an earlier colony at Tabeguache Park, five miles from Naturita. The colony then relocated to the confluence of the San Miguel River and Cottonwood Creek where Piñon was established. The first task was to construct an irrigation ditch for the new settlement that connected Tabegueache Park to Piñon. A sawmill was then built nearby to mill lumber for constructing homes and irrigation flumes.

In 1895, the newspaper, The Alturian, which was published by the company, stated, “We do not invite any indolent individual, man or woman, that seeks a Colony with the expectation of living easy,”...“We want willing muscle owners that can swing a pick, turn over a rock, cut down a tree, load a wagon, hold a scraper, drive a team and do a thousand and one things.”

The settlement was eventually named Piñon, and by 1901 the town had 50 buildings, including the company office, a print shop, commissary, library, school, hall, carpenter shop, barn, cabins, a rooming house known as “The Beehive” as well as a community dining hall.

Two years later, in 1903, the "Cottonwood Trestle" was completed over the San Miguel River. At this time, approximately 7 miles of irrigation ditch had been built. The trestle was 840 feet long, and 108 feet high at its apex; it was reportedly both the longest and the highest trestle for irrigation in the world. The following year, in 1904, the ditch was finished.

The colony existed at Piñon from 1894 to 1906; having been established by 300 to 400 socialists. All workers in the town were paid 20 cents per hour irrespective of the type of work they did. Land ownership was based on the "single tax" system. Worker's wages could only be used at the colony dining room, or to purchase items at the communal store. Leftover wage credits were put into the colony's fund to work on the irrigation ditch and to purchase additional property. A total of 30,000 acres had been acquired by the colony during the time it existed. The entirety of this property was owned by the cooperative company. The main objective of the cooperative was to build a 17-mile long irrigation ditch from the San Miguel River to Tabequache Park in order to develop the land, establish manufacturing operations and to "insure members against want, provide recreational, educational facilities, provide social harmony based on principles of cooperation". However the majority of activity circulated around the task of ditch-digging.

The San Miguel Basin Forum newspaper reported that Piñon was the second largest town in the county for many years, and that early life in the town was difficult. The commissary distributed supplies and its sergeant dispensed monthly coupon books to each worker or family living in Piñon. Food was rationed and in scant supply; the staples were flour, salt, oatmeal, beans and salt pork. Each family received $15 per month in coupons, while single miners only received $3.50 monthly.

The community also had a cultural component and Piñon attracted creatives, including musicians, actors and artists. Performances and literary events were held in the assembly hall. Dances would occur on Saturday nights. For a time Pinon was a "Center of Culture"; in 1896, acting and elocution lessons were provided to the community members. The Piñon Dramatic Club gave their first performances in Company Hall the same year. By 1902, there were as many as three dances per week occurring. The mining families were interested in art and engaged in politics, they were considered to be intellectual and engaged with reading and discussing books after mining was done for the day. Pinon had its own newspaper, The Altrurian, as well as other community-run establishments, such as an irrigation ditch-digging company.

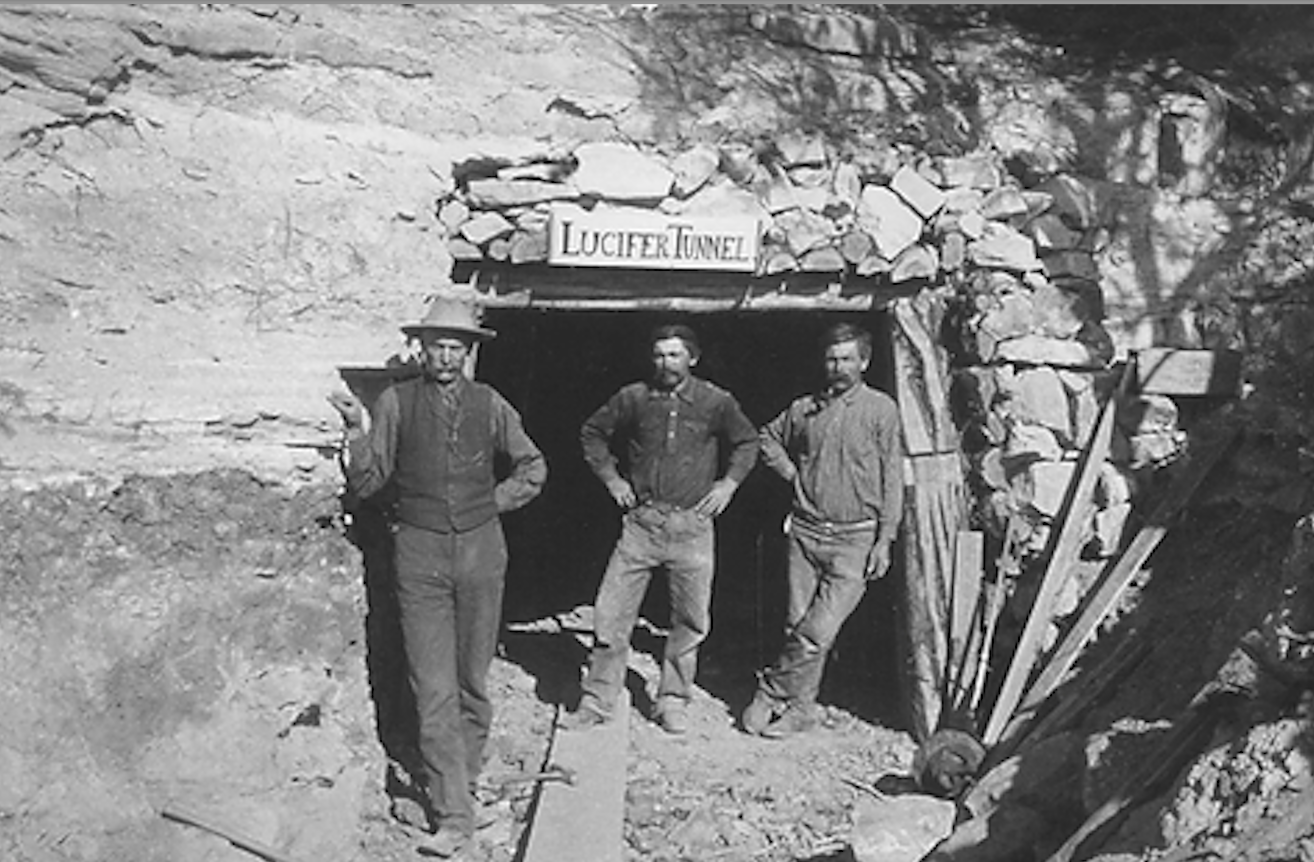
Colorado Cooperative Company ditch crew, c.1904

After the irrigation ditch was completed in 1904, settlers in Piñon dismantled their houses and moved them to Tabeguache Park. The population in Piñon began to dwindle. The town post office eventually closed in 1921 after the population had decreased to 120 residents. The president of the Rimrocker Historical Society, Jane Thompson, stated that the members of the colony then focused their labor on establishing their own farms, rather than the collective. According to Thompson, “Certainly, they still had a spirit of cooperation” and worked together to build a school, church and community buildings in the new town of Nucla." By the second decade of the century, the agricultural focus shifted to Nucla. In 1906, 400 people had invested in the community as stockholders. By that time, the first of those who settled there began to establish the town of Nucla nearby.

A book was written about the colony at Piñon by Ellen Peterson who moved there in 1900 with her family when she was still a child.
