= Lincoln County, Colorado =

County in Colorado, United States

- County
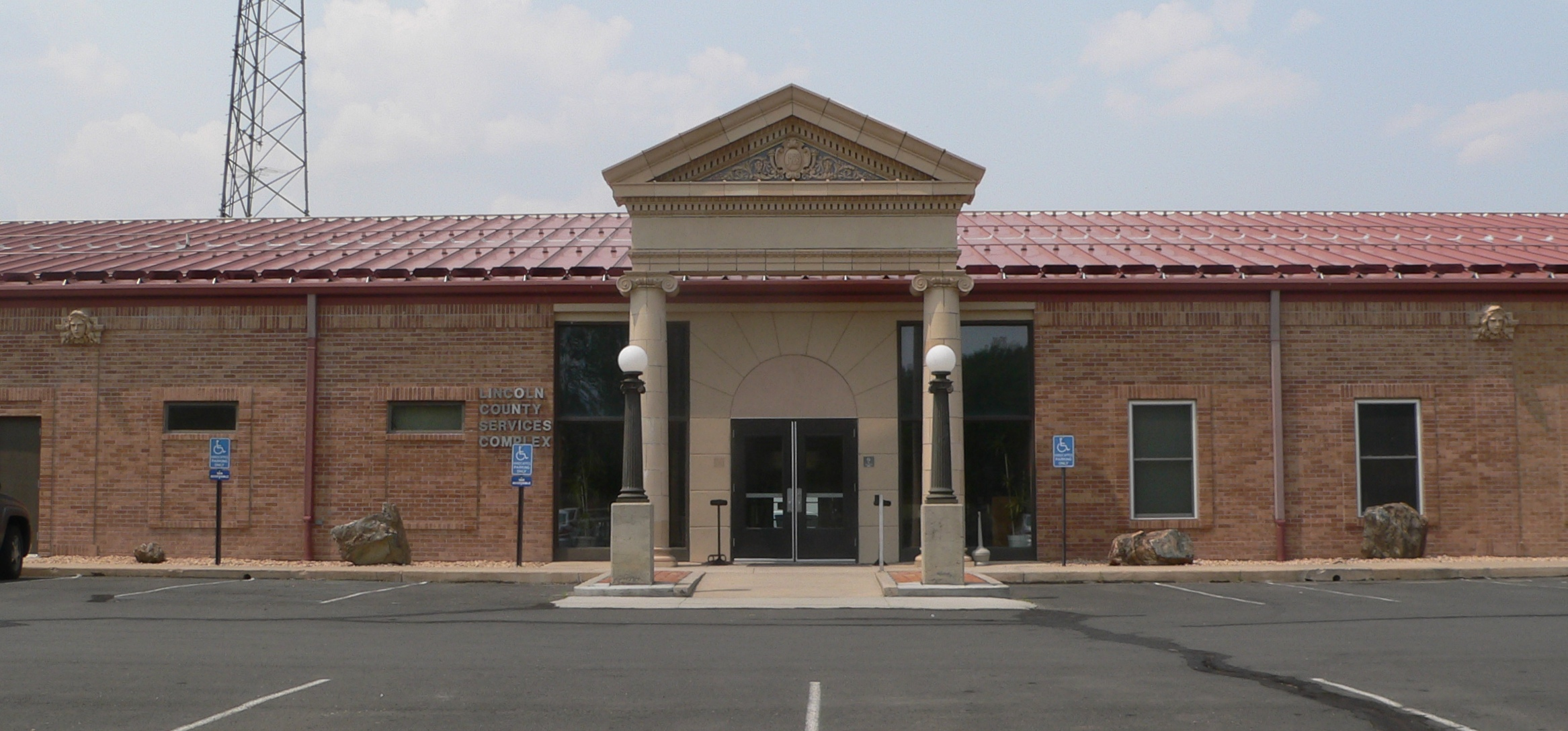
- Lincoln County Courthouse in Hugo

- Location within the U.S. state of Colorado
- Coordinates: 38.98°N 103.52°W
- Country: United States
- State: Colorado
- Founded: April 11, 1889
- Named for: Abraham Lincoln
- Seat: Hugo
- Largest town: Limon

Area
  - Total: 2,586 sq mi (6,700 km^{2})
  - Land: 2,578 sq mi (6,680 km^{2})
  - Water: 8.8 sq mi (23 km^{2}) 0.3%

Population (2020)
  - Total: 5,675
  - Estimate (2025): 5,645 ▼
  - Density: 2.201/sq mi (0.8499/km^{2})
- Time zone: UTC−7 (Mountain)
  - Summer (DST): UTC−6 (MDT)
- Congressional district: 4th
- Website: lincolncounty.colorado.gov

Lincoln County is a county located in the U.S. state of Colorado. As of the 2020 census, the population was 5,675. The county seat is Hugo. The county obtains its name in memory of the United States President Abraham Lincoln. The county was formed from portions of Bent and Elbert counties in 1889 from a restructuring of Colorado counties.

== Geography ==
According to the U.S. Census Bureau, the county has a total area of 2,586 square miles (6,700 km^{2}), of which 2,578 square miles (6,680 km^{2}) is land and 8.8 square miles (23 km^{2}) (0.3%) is water.

The main watersheds include the Arikaree and Republican Rivers in the northern part of the county and the Big Sandy, Rush, and Horse Creeks in the southern part of the county. Big Sandy and Rush Creeks ultimately drain into the Arkansas River.

=== Adjacent counties ===
- Washington County - north
- Kit Carson County - east
- Cheyenne County - east
- Crowley County - south
- Kiowa County - south
- Elbert County - west
- El Paso County - west
- Arapahoe County - northwest
- Pueblo County - southwest

=== Major highways ===
- I-70
  - I-70 BL
- US 24
- US 40
- US 287
- SH 71
- SH 94
- CR 109

== Government ==
Lincoln County's government is based in the county courthouse in Hugo which is the office of the board of three elected commissioners and a county administrator, as well as the county sheriff, county clerk and recorder, county assessor, county treasurer, county coroner, and the county court (the trial court of limited jurisdiction for county affairs). Lincoln County is part of the 18th Colorado Judicial District — the state trial court of general jurisdiction — with judicial matters conducted in the Littleton and Centennial courthouses in Arapahoe County. Lincoln County's government operation also includes a department of social services, land use office, road and bridge department, human services department, public health department, mobile library services, probation department, county landfill, county fairgrounds, and county extension service.

United States presidential election results for Lincoln County, Colorado
Year	Republican		Democratic		Third party(ies)	
Year	No.	%	No.	%	No.	%
1892	113	64.57%	0	0.00%	62	35.43%
1896	123	36.72%	210	62.69%	2	0.60%
1900	255	66.93%	124	32.55%	2	0.52%
1904	323	69.91%	132	28.57%	7	1.52%
1908	794	56.23%	576	40.79%	42	2.97%
1912	534	23.41%	796	34.90%	951	41.69%
1916	1,129	37.81%	1,702	57.00%	155	5.19%
1920	1,815	61.26%	1,013	34.19%	135	4.56%
1924	1,642	54.70%	634	21.12%	726	24.18%
1928	2,110	69.11%	888	29.09%	55	1.80%
1932	1,453	41.09%	1,979	55.97%	104	2.94%
1936	1,420	44.89%	1,660	52.48%	83	2.62%
1940	1,780	59.57%	1,185	39.66%	23	0.77%
1944	1,689	59.49%	1,147	40.40%	3	0.11%
1948	1,271	50.52%	1,231	48.93%	14	0.56%
1952	1,843	66.46%	927	33.43%	3	0.11%
1956	1,603	61.25%	1,012	38.67%	2	0.08%
1960	1,498	58.93%	1,041	40.95%	3	0.12%
1964	1,104	45.26%	1,327	54.41%	8	0.33%
1968	1,407	57.08%	809	32.82%	249	10.10%
1972	1,678	70.03%	685	28.59%	33	1.38%
1976	1,276	53.46%	1,059	44.37%	52	2.18%
1980	1,535	64.74%	602	25.39%	234	9.87%
1984	1,661	72.91%	587	25.77%	30	1.32%
1988	1,356	60.29%	874	38.86%	19	0.84%
1992	1,079	46.79%	640	27.75%	587	25.46%
1996	1,272	57.74%	729	33.09%	202	9.17%
2000	1,630	74.12%	510	23.19%	59	2.68%
2004	1,819	77.83%	503	21.52%	15	0.64%
2008	1,717	74.52%	546	23.70%	41	1.78%
2012	1,687	73.76%	552	24.14%	48	2.10%
2016	1,892	77.67%	409	16.79%	135	5.54%
2020	2,135	80.54%	470	17.73%	46	1.74%
2024	2,090	81.29%	432	16.80%	49	1.91%

United States Senate election results for Lincoln County, Colorado2
Year	Republican		Democratic		Third party(ies)	
Year	No.	%	No.	%	No.	%
2020	2,141	81.22%	434	16.46%	61	2.31%

United States Senate election results for Lincoln County, Colorado3
Year	Republican		Democratic		Third party(ies)	
Year	No.	%	No.	%	No.	%
2022	1,624	77.11%	401	19.04%	81	3.85%

Colorado Gubernatorial election results for Lincoln County
Year	Republican		Democratic		Third party(ies)	
Year	No.	%	No.	%	No.	%
2022	1,608	76.57%	390	18.57%	102	4.86%

== Demographics ==
Historical population
Census	Pop.	Note	%±
1890	689		—
1900	926		34.4%
1910	5,917		539.0%
1920	8,273		39.8%
1930	7,850		−5.1%
1940	5,882		−25.1%
1950	5,909		0.5%
1960	5,310		−10.1%
1970	4,836		−8.9%
1980	4,663		−3.6%
1990	4,529		−2.9%
2000	6,087		34.4%
2010	5,467		−10.2%
2020	5,675		3.8%
2025 (est.)	5,645	▼	−0.5%
U.S. Decennial Census; 1790-1960 1900-1990; 1990-2000 2010-2020

=== 2020 census ===
As of the 2020 census, the county had a population of 5,675. Of the residents, 21.0% were under the age of 18 and 17.2% were 65 years of age or older; the median age was 39.2 years. For every 100 females there were 140.9 males, and for every 100 females age 18 and over there were 149.2 males. 0.0% of residents lived in urban areas and 100.0% lived in rural areas.

Lincoln County, Colorado – Racial and ethnic composition Note: the US Census treats Hispanic/Latino as an ethnic category. This table excludes Latinos from the racial categories and assigns them to a separate category. Hispanics/Latinos may be of any race.
Race / Ethnicity (NH = Non-Hispanic)	Pop 2000	Pop 2010	Pop 2020	% 2000	% 2010	% 2020
White alone (NH)	5,126	4,345	4,252	84.21%	79.48%	74.92%
Black or African American alone (NH)	298	280	275	4.90%	5.12%	4.85%
Native American or Alaska Native alone (NH)	50	38	61	0.82%	0.70%	1.07%
Asian alone (NH)	33	39	40	0.54%	0.71%	0.70%
Pacific Islander alone (NH)	2	2	22	0.03%	0.04%	0.39%
Other race alone (NH)	0	3	21	0.00%	0.05%	0.37%
Mixed race or Multiracial (NH)	59	77	195	0.97%	1.41%	3.44%
Hispanic or Latino (any race)	519	683	809	8.53%	12.49%	14.26%
Total	6,087	5,467	5,675	100.00%	100.00%	100.00%

The racial makeup of the county was 77.5% White, 4.8% Black or African American, 1.3% American Indian and Alaska Native, 0.8% Asian, 0.4% Native Hawaiian and Pacific Islander, 8.7% from some other race, and 6.4% from two or more races. Hispanic or Latino residents of any race comprised 14.3% of the population.

There were 1,980 households in the county, of which 28.6% had children under the age of 18 living with them and 24.4% had a female householder with no spouse or partner present. About 32.8% of all households were made up of individuals and 15.7% had someone living alone who was 65 years of age or older.

There were 2,358 housing units, of which 16.0% were vacant. Among occupied housing units, 65.4% were owner-occupied and 34.6% were renter-occupied. The homeowner vacancy rate was 2.7% and the rental vacancy rate was 7.8%.

=== 2000 census ===
At the 2000 census there were 6,087 people in 2,058 households, including 1,389 families, in the county. The population density was 2 people per square mile (0.77 people/km^{2}). There were 2,406 housing units at an average density of 1 units per square mile (0.39 units/km^{2}). The racial makeup of the county was 86.30% White, 4.96% Black or African American, 0.94% Native American, 0.56% Asian, 0.03% Pacific Islander, 5.65% from other races, and 1.56% from two or more races. 8.53% of the population were Hispanic or Latino of any race. Of the 2,058 households 33.70% had children under the age of 18 living with them, 55.30% were married couples living together, 8.40% had a female householder with no husband present, and 32.50% were non-families. 29.00% of households were one person and 13.00% were one person aged 65 or older. The average household size was 2.44 and the average family size was 3.04.

The age distribution was 23.90% under the age of 18, 7.10% from 18 to 24, 33.00% from 25 to 44, 21.80% from 45 to 64, and 14.30% 65 or older. The median age was 38 years. For every 100 females there were 130.90 males. For every 100 females age 18 and over, there were 140.70 males.

The median household income was $31,914 and the median family income was $39,738. Males had a median income of $25,742 versus $22,188 for females. The per capita income for the county was $15,510. About 8.10% of families and 11.70% of the population were below the poverty line, including 14.40% of those under age 18 and 11.50% of those age 65 or over.

== Communities ==
=== Towns ===
- Arriba
- Genoa
- Hugo
- Limon

=== Unincorporated communities ===
- Bovina
- Boyero
- Karval
- Punkin Center

== Historic trail ==
- Smoky Hill Trail

The name "Smoky Hill" comes from the appearance of the misty or smoky hills that the westward travelers viewed on their journey from Kansas and Nebraska Territories and Missouri toward the Colorado Gold Rush starting in 1858. Gold, had been discovered in the Cherry Creek, near Denver. The image of the misty hills and valleys along the route west gave the name to the trail for these travelers — the Smoky Hill Trail. Parts of the trail can still be seen as a two-track road on the Eastern Plains in what was once Kansas Territory but now is Colorado.

The section of the Smoky Hill Trail which passes through much of the High Plains has become known as the "starvation trail." This section of the trail proved to be the most difficult, due to a lack of water, yet the Plains Indians of the day considered this region as prime hunting ground.

== See also ==
- Bibliography of Colorado
- Geography of Colorado
- History of Colorado
  - National Register of Historic Places listings in Lincoln County, Colorado
- Index of Colorado-related articles
- List of Colorado-related lists
  - List of counties in Colorado
- Outline of Colorado
