= Montrose County, Colorado =

County in Colorado, United States

- County
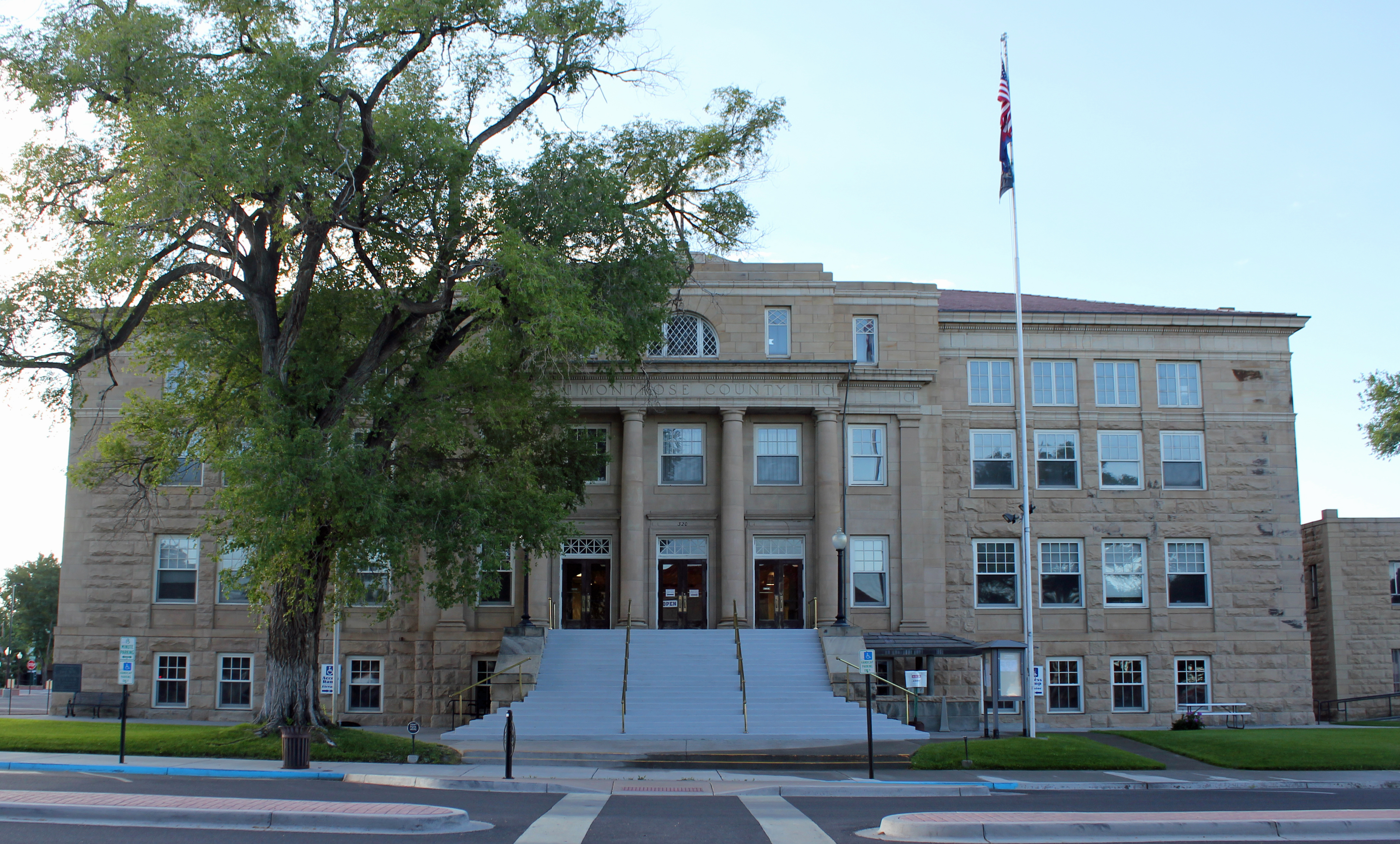
- Montrose County Courthouse in Montrose

- Location within the U.S. state of Colorado
- Coordinates: 38.41°N 108.27°W
- Country: United States
- State: Colorado
- Founded: February 11, 1883
- Named for: City of Montrose
- Seat: Montrose
- Largest city: Montrose

Area
  - Total: 2,243 sq mi (5,810 km^{2})
  - Land: 2,241 sq mi (5,800 km^{2})
  - Water: 1.9 sq mi (4.9 km^{2}) 0.08%

Population (2020)
  - Total: 42,679
  - Estimate (2025): 44,591 ▲
  - Density: 19/sq mi (7.3/km^{2})
- Time zone: UTC−7 (Mountain)
  - Summer (DST): UTC−6 (MDT)
- Congressional district: 3rd
- Website: www.montrosecounty.net

Montrose County is a county located in the U.S. state of Colorado. As of the 2020 census, the population was 42,679. The county seat is Montrose, for which the county is named.

Montrose County comprises the Montrose micropolitan area (a Micropolitan Statistical Area).

== Geography ==
According to the U.S. Census Bureau, the county has a total area of 2,243 square miles (5,810 km^{2}), of which 2,241 square miles (5,800 km^{2}) is land and 1.9 square miles (4.9 km^{2}) (0.08%) is water.

=== Adjacent counties ===
- Mesa County - north
- Delta County - northeast
- Gunnison County - east
- Ouray County - southeast
- San Miguel County - south
- San Juan County, Utah - west

=== Major highways ===
- U.S. Highway 50
- U.S. Highway 550
- State Highway 90
- State Highway 92
- State Highway 141
- State Highway 145
- State Highway 348

=== National protected areas ===
- Black Canyon of the Gunnison National Park
- Black Canyon of the Gunnison Wilderness
- Curecanti National Recreation Area (part)
- Dominguez-Escalante National Conservation Area (part)
- Gunnison Gorge National Conservation Area (part)
- Gunnison Gorge Wilderness
- Gunnison National Forest (part)
- Manti-La Sal National Forest (part)
- Old Spanish National Historic Trail
- Uncompahgre National Forest (part)

=== River ===
- Dolores River (part)
- Uncompahgre River (part)
- San Miguel River (part)
- Gunnison River (part)

=== Trails and byways ===
- Great Parks Bicycle Route
- Unaweep/Tabeguache Scenic and Historic Byway
- West Elk Loop Scenic Byway
- Western Express Bicycle Route

=== Historical site ===
- Hanging Flume
- Uravan, Colorado

== Demographics ==
Historical population
Census	Pop.	Note	%±
1890	3,980		—
1900	4,535		13.9%
1910	10,291		126.9%
1920	11,852		15.2%
1930	11,742		−0.9%
1940	15,418		31.3%
1950	15,220		−1.3%
1960	18,286		20.1%
1970	18,366		0.4%
1980	24,352		32.6%
1990	24,423		0.3%
2000	33,432		36.9%
2010	41,276		23.5%
2020	42,679		3.4%
2025 (est.)	44,591	▲	4.5%
U.S. Decennial Census; 1790-1960 1900-1990; 1990-2000 2010-2020

A July 1, 2009 U.S. Census Bureau estimate placed the population at 41,412.

=== 2020 census ===
As of the 2020 census, the county had a population of 42,679. Of the residents, 21.3% were under the age of 18 and 24.5% were 65 years of age or older; the median age was 45.5 years. For every 100 females there were 98.1 males, and for every 100 females age 18 and over there were 95.9 males. 57.4% of residents lived in urban areas and 42.6% lived in rural areas.

Montrose County, Colorado – Racial and ethnic composition Note: the US Census treats Hispanic/Latino as an ethnic category. This table excludes Latinos from the racial categories and assigns them to a separate category. Hispanics/Latinos may be of any race.
Race / Ethnicity (NH = Non-Hispanic)	Pop 2000	Pop 2010	Pop 2020	% 2000	% 2010	% 2020
White alone (NH)	27,554	31,989	31,126	82.42%	77.50%	72.93%
Black or African American alone (NH)	78	118	159	0.23%	0.29%	0.37%
Native American or Alaska Native alone (NH)	228	204	262	0.68%	0.49%	0.61%
Asian alone (NH)	130	236	334	0.39%	0.57%	0.78%
Pacific Islander alone (NH)	19	24	26	0.06%	0.06%	0.06%
Other race alone (NH)	17	59	183	0.05%	0.14%	0.43%
Mixed race or Multiracial (NH)	439	519	1,562	1.31%	1.26%	3.66%
Hispanic or Latino (any race)	4,967	8,127	9,027	14.86%	19.69%	21.15%
Total	33,432	41,276	42,679	100.00%	100.00%	100.00%

The racial makeup of the county was 78.2% White, 0.4% Black or African American, 1.4% American Indian and Alaska Native, 0.8% Asian, 0.1% Native Hawaiian and Pacific Islander, 9.1% from some other race, and 10.0% from two or more races. Hispanic or Latino residents of any race comprised 21.2% of the population.

There were 17,482 households in the county, of which 26.6% had children under the age of 18 living with them and 24.2% had a female householder with no spouse or partner present. About 27.7% of all households were made up of individuals and 14.8% had someone living alone who was 65 years of age or older.

There were 18,952 housing units, of which 7.8% were vacant. Among occupied housing units, 73.1% were owner-occupied and 26.9% were renter-occupied. The homeowner vacancy rate was 1.6% and the rental vacancy rate was 6.1%.

=== 2010 census ===
As of the census of 2010, there were 41,276 people, 16,484 households, and 11,461 families residing in the county. The population density was 18 people per square mile (6.9 people/km^{2}). There were 18,250 housing units at an average density of 8 units per square mile (3.1 units/km^{2}). The racial makeup of the county was 86.70% White, 0.40% Black or African American, 1.10% Native American, 0.60% Asian, 0.10% Pacific Islander, 8.70% from other races, and 2.40% from two or more races. 19.70% of the population were Hispanic or Latino of any race.

There were 16,484 households, out of which 31.20% had children under the age of 18 living with them, 56.10% were married couples living together, 9.10% had a female householder with no husband present, and 30.50% were non-families. 25.80% of all households were made up of individuals, and 12.00% had someone living alone who was 65 years of age or older. The average household size was 2.47 and the average family size was 2.97.

The county population was spread out, with 24.70% under the age of 18, 6.40% from 18 to 24, 22.50% from 25 to 44, 28.60% from 45 to 64, and 17.80% who were 65 years of age or older. The median age was 42 years. For every 100 females there were 96.00 males. For every 100 females age 18 and over, there were 94.00 males.

Also from the census of 2010, the median income for a household in the county was $46,058, and the median income for a family was $52,152. Males had a median income of $41,301 versus $31,659 for females. The per capita income for the county was $22,413. About 7.30% of families and 10.20% of the population were below the poverty line, including 13.40% of those under age 18 and 9.80% of those age 65 or over.

== Politics ==
Montrose is a staunch Republican county. It has not been won by a Democratic presidential nominee since Lyndon Johnson‘s 1964 landslide – indeed since then, no Democrat has managed forty percent of the county's vote. The county has leaned Republican ever since 1920; although before this, it did tend to vote Democratic between 1896 and 1916 except during the landslide loss of Alton B. Parker in 1904.

United States presidential election results for Montrose County, Colorado
Year	Republican		Democratic		Third party(ies)	
Year	No.	%	No.	%	No.	%
1884	420	62.69%	230	34.33%	20	2.99%
1888	512	55.65%	372	40.43%	36	3.91%
1892	301	34.88%	0	0.00%	562	65.12%
1896	182	11.64%	1,348	86.19%	34	2.17%
1900	658	35.88%	1,038	56.60%	138	7.52%
1904	1,306	51.56%	922	36.40%	305	12.04%
1908	1,193	38.71%	1,461	47.40%	428	13.89%
1912	631	16.82%	1,478	39.39%	1,643	43.79%
1916	1,315	31.47%	2,571	61.52%	293	7.01%
1920	2,225	54.83%	1,522	37.51%	311	7.66%
1924	2,077	45.82%	1,239	27.33%	1,217	26.85%
1928	2,873	67.27%	1,297	30.37%	101	2.36%
1932	1,992	41.00%	2,516	51.79%	350	7.20%
1936	2,248	41.44%	2,938	54.16%	239	4.41%
1940	3,744	54.62%	3,013	43.95%	98	1.43%
1944	2,952	56.37%	2,258	43.12%	27	0.52%
1948	2,473	48.34%	2,544	49.73%	99	1.94%
1952	4,279	67.16%	2,037	31.97%	55	0.86%
1956	4,054	62.04%	2,461	37.66%	19	0.29%
1960	4,040	58.34%	2,861	41.31%	24	0.35%
1964	2,678	39.92%	4,009	59.76%	22	0.33%
1968	3,547	52.85%	2,394	35.67%	771	11.49%
1972	4,571	64.75%	1,870	26.49%	618	8.75%
1976	4,838	58.42%	3,164	38.20%	280	3.38%
1980	6,685	68.21%	2,232	22.78%	883	9.01%
1984	7,162	70.40%	2,864	28.15%	147	1.45%
1988	6,012	60.16%	3,748	37.51%	233	2.33%
1992	4,847	41.35%	3,713	31.67%	3,163	26.98%
1996	6,730	54.99%	4,019	32.84%	1,490	12.17%
2000	9,266	65.18%	4,041	28.43%	908	6.39%
2004	11,218	69.17%	4,776	29.45%	225	1.39%
2008	12,199	63.69%	6,495	33.91%	459	2.40%
2012	13,552	67.32%	6,138	30.49%	440	2.19%
2016	14,382	67.88%	5,466	25.80%	1,338	6.32%
2020	16,770	67.29%	7,687	30.84%	465	1.87%
2024	16,704	65.18%	8,354	32.60%	568	2.22%

United States Senate election results for Montrose County, Colorado2
Year	Republican		Democratic		Third party(ies)	
Year	No.	%	No.	%	No.	%
2020	16,978	68.31%	7,321	29.45%	557	2.24%

United States Senate election results for Montrose County, Colorado3
Year	Republican		Democratic		Third party(ies)	
Year	No.	%	No.	%	No.	%
2022	12,894	61.90%	7,255	34.83%	681	3.27%

Colorado Gubernatorial election results for Montrose County
Year	Republican		Democratic		Third party(ies)	
Year	No.	%	No.	%	No.	%
2022	12,835	61.41%	7,529	36.02%	536	2.56%

In other offices, Montrose also is strongly Republican. The last Democratic Senatorial candidate it backed was Ben Nighthorse Campbell, who later shifted to the Republican Party, in the 1992 election. Montrose County did back Constitution Party nominee Tom Tancredo in the 2010 gubernatorial election, and Bill Ritter did win 46 percent in 2006, but Roy Romer in 1990 remains the last Democratic candidate for governor to win Montrose County.

== Culture ==
- Ute Indian Museum

== Communities ==
=== City ===
- Montrose

=== Towns ===
- Naturita
- Nucla
- Olathe

=== Census-designated place ===
- Redvale

=== Other unincorporated places ===
- Bedrock
- Cimarron
- Coventry
- Maher
- Mountain View
- Oak Grove
- Paradox
- Pea Green Corner
- Piñon
- Uravan

== See also ==
- Bibliography of Colorado
- Geography of Colorado
- History of Colorado
  - National Register of Historic Places listings in Montrose County, Colorado
- Index of Colorado-related articles
- List of Colorado-related lists
  - List of counties in Colorado
  - List of statistical areas in Colorado
- Outline of Colorado
