= 1956 United States presidential election in Colorado =

- November 6, 1956

All 6 Colorado votes to the Electoral College

Nominee	Dwight D. Eisenhower	Adlai Stevenson
Party	Republican	Democratic
Home state	Pennsylvania (Note: Although he was born in Texas and grew up in Kansas before his military career, at the time of the 1952 election Eisenhower was president of Columbia University and was, officially, a resident of New York. During his first term as president, he moved his private residence to Gettysburg, Pennsylvania, and officially changed his residency to Pennsylvania.)	Illinois
Running mate	Richard Nixon	Estes Kefauver
Electoral vote	6	0
Popular vote	394,479	263,997
Percentage	59.49%	39.81%
County results
Eisenhower
50–60%
60–70%
70–80%
Stevenson
50–60%
President before election
Dwight D. Eisenhower
Republican
Elected President
Dwight D. Eisenhower
Republican

The 1956 United States presidential election in Colorado took place on November 6, 1956, as part of the 1956 United States presidential election. State voters chose six representatives, or electors, to the Electoral College, who voted for president and vice president.

Colorado was won by incumbent President Dwight D. Eisenhower (R–Pennsylvania), running with Vice President Richard Nixon, with 59.49% of the popular vote, against Adlai Stevenson (D–Illinois), running with Senator Estes Kefauver, with 39.81% of the popular vote.

== Results ==
1956 United States presidential election in Colorado
Party	Candidate	Votes	%
Republican	Dwight D. Eisenhower (inc.)	394,479	59.49%
Democratic	Adlai Stevenson	263,997	39.81%
Socialist Labor	Eric Hass	3,308	0.50%
Constitutional States’ Rights	T. Coleman Andrews	759	0.11%
Socialist	Darlington Hoopes	531	0.08%
Total votes		663,074	100%

=== By county ===
County	Dwight D. Eisenhower Republican		Adlai Stevenson Democratic		Eric Hass Socialist Labor		T. Coleman Andrews Constitutional States’ Rights		Darlington Hoopes Socialist		Margin		Total votes cast
County	#	%	#	%	#	%	#	%	#	%	#	%	Total votes cast
Adams	12,778	52.23%	11,470	46.89%	200	0.82%	15	0.06%	0	0.00%	1,308	5.34%	24,463
Alamosa	2,442	62.33%	1,465	37.39%	7	0.18%	4	0.10%	0	0.00%	977	24.94%	3,918
Arapahoe	19,716	63.11%	11,351	36.33%	157	0.50%	4	0.01%	15	0.05%	8,365	26.78%	31,243
Archuleta	635	59.91%	423	39.91%	2	0.19%	0	0.00%	0	0.00%	212	20.00%	1,060
Baca	1,715	59.63%	1,150	39.99%	8	0.28%	3	0.10%	0	0.00%	565	19.64%	2,876
Bent	1,718	57.25%	1,283	42.75%	0	0.00%	0	0.00%	0	0.00%	435	14.50%	3,001
Boulder	16,748	66.89%	8,149	32.55%	121	0.48%	21	0.08%	0	0.00%	8,599	34.34%	25,039
Chaffee	2,284	63.67%	1,303	36.33%	0	0.00%	0	0.00%	0	0.00%	981	27.34%	3,587
Cheyenne	820	61.70%	507	38.15%	2	0.15%	0	0.00%	0	0.00%	313	23.55%	1,329
Clear Creek	973	64.87%	520	34.67%	1	0.07%	3	0.20%	3	0.20%	453	30.20%	1,500
Conejos	1,884	55.89%	1,471	43.64%	8	0.24%	1	0.02%	7	0.21%	413	12.25%	3,371
Costilla	958	42.50%	1,256	55.72%	23	1.02%	17	0.75%	0	0.00%	-298	-13.22%	2,254
Crowley	1,220	62.05%	745	37.89%	1	0.05%	0	0.00%	0	0.00%	475	24.16%	1,966
Custer	534	66.83%	264	33.04%	1	0.13%	0	0.00%	0	0.00%	270	33.79%	799
Delta	4,531	64.71%	2,458	35.10%	5	0.07%	4	0.06%	4	0.06%	2,073	29.61%	7,002
Denver	121,402	55.91%	93,812	43.21%	1,545	0.71%	156	0.07%	206	0.09%	27,590	12.70%	217,121
Dolores	544	60.38%	354	39.29%	2	0.22%	1	0.11%	0	0.00%	190	21.09%	901
Douglas	1,508	68.08%	697	31.47%	2	0.09%	5	0.23%	3	0.14%	811	36.61%	2,215
Eagle	1,154	57.36%	852	42.35%	4	0.20%	2	0.10%	0	0.00%	302	15.01%	2,012
El Paso	27,282	58.46%	18,879	40.46%	31	0.07%	445	0.95%	29	0.06%	8,403	18.00%	46,666
Elbert	1,295	64.75%	702	35.10%	1	0.05%	1	0.05%	1	0.05%	593	29.65%	2,000
Fremont	6,040	67.40%	2,896	32.31%	4	0.04%	14	0.16%	8	0.09%	3,144	35.09%	8,962
Garfield	3,332	62.90%	1,953	36.87%	2	0.04%	8	0.15%	2	0.04%	1,379	26.03%	5,297
Gilpin	394	61.66%	244	38.18%	1	0.16%	0	0.00%	0	0.00%	150	23.48%	639
Grand	1,239	71.33%	496	28.55%	1	0.06%	1	0.06%	0	0.00%	743	42.78%	1,737
Gunnison	1,400	62.31%	846	37.65%	1	0.04%	0	0.00%	0	0.00%	554	24.66%	2,247
Hinsdale	155	76.73%	47	23.27%	0	0.00%	0	0.00%	0	0.00%	108	53.46%	202
Huerfano	2,091	47.90%	2,262	51.82%	7	0.16%	2	0.05%	3	0.07%	-171	-3.92%	4,365
Jackson	594	66.59%	297	33.30%	1	0.11%	0	0.00%	0	0.00%	297	33.29%	892
Jefferson	25,398	63.71%	14,270	35.80%	145	0.36%	33	0.08%	19	0.05%	11,128	27.91%	39,865
Kiowa	810	64.64%	443	35.36%	0	0.00%	0	0.00%	0	0.00%	367	29.28%	1,253
Kit Carson	2,243	70.96%	911	28.82%	3	0.09%	4	0.13%	0	0.00%	1,332	42.14%	3,161
La Plata	4,770	66.81%	2,366	33.14%	2	0.03%	1	0.01%	1	0.01%	2,404	33.67%	7,140
Lake	1,433	51.31%	1,355	48.51%	3	0.11%	2	0.07%	0	0.00%	78	2.80%	2,793
Larimer	14,364	71.77%	5,612	28.04%	9	0.04%	12	0.06%	18	0.09%	8,752	43.73%	20,015
Las Animas	5,290	50.80%	5,099	48.96%	16	0.15%	9	0.09%	0	0.00%	191	1.84%	10,414
Lincoln	1,603	61.25%	1,012	38.67%	2	0.08%	0	0.00%	0	0.00%	591	22.58%	2,617
Logan	5,199	64.50%	2,841	35.25%	6	0.07%	12	0.15%	2	0.02%	2,358	29.25%	8,060
Mesa	12,869	62.79%	7,567	36.92%	24	0.12%	26	0.13%	10	0.05%	5,302	25.87%	20,496
Mineral	168	62.69%	99	36.94%	1	0.37%	0	0.00%	0	0.00%	69	25.75%	268
Moffat	1,762	68.80%	797	31.12%	1	0.04%	1	0.04%	0	0.00%	965	37.68%	2,561
Montezuma	2,492	63.59%	1,402	35.77%	8	0.20%	17	0.43%	0	0.00%	1,090	27.82%	3,919
Montrose	4,054	62.04%	2,461	37.66%	10	0.15%	2	0.03%	7	0.11%	1,593	24.38%	6,534
Morgan	5,325	64.17%	2,956	35.62%	11	0.13%	6	0.07%	0	0.00%	2,369	28.55%	8,298
Otero	5,964	61.53%	3,722	38.40%	1	0.01%	3	0.03%	3	0.03%	2,242	23.13%	9,693
Ouray	634	65.90%	322	33.47%	1	0.10%	5	0.52%	0	0.00%	312	32.43%	962
Park	715	70.58%	297	29.32%	1	0.10%	15	0.06%	0	0.00%	418	41.26%	1,013
Phillips	1,535	63.35%	887	36.61%	1	0.04%	0	0.00%	0	0.00%	648	26.74%	2,423
Pitkin	550	62.15%	334	37.74%	1	0.11%	0	0.00%	0	0.00%	216	24.41%	885
Prowers	3,350	57.61%	2,460	42.30%	4	0.07%	1	0.02%	0	0.00%	890	15.31%	5,815
Pueblo	23,454	52.34%	20,433	45.60%	876	1.95%	4	0.01%	47	0.10%	3,021	6.74%	44,814
Rio Blanco	1,593	71.47%	635	28.49%	1	0.04%	0	0.00%	0	0.00%	958	42.98%	2,229
Rio Grande	2,816	66.04%	1,441	33.79%	5	0.12%	2	0.05%	0	0.00%	1,375	32.25%	4,264
Routt	1,811	57.55%	1,330	42.26%	1	0.03%	1	0.03%	4	0.13%	481	15.29%	3,147
Saguache	1,149	58.03%	823	41.57%	3	0.15%	5	0.25%	0	0.00%	326	16.46%	1,980
San Juan	324	58.38%	231	41.62%	0	0.00%	0	0.00%	0	0.00%	93	16.76%	555
San Miguel	648	57.86%	469	41.88%	3	0.27%	0	0.00%	0	0.00%	179	15.98%	1,120
Sedgwick	1,334	63.55%	760	36.21%	1	0.05%	1	0.05%	3	0.14%	574	27.34%	2,099
Summit	429	64.61%	235	35.39%	0	0.00%	0	0.00%	0	0.00%	194	29.22%	664
Teller	977	66.42%	494	33.58%	0	0.00%	0	0.00%	0	0.00%	483	32.84%	1,471
Washington	2,020	65.20%	1,067	34.44%	2	0.06%	4	0.13%	5	0.16%	953	30.76%	3,098
Weld	17,228	62.75%	10,170	37.04%	34	0.12%	7	0.03%	16	0.06%	7,058	25.71%	27,455
Yuma	2,782	64.26%	1,544	35.67%	2	0.05%	1	0.02%	0	0.00%	1,238	28.59%	4,329
Total	394,479	59.49%	263,997	39.81%	3,308	0.50%	759	0.11%	531	0.08%	130,482	19.68%	663,074

==== Counties that flipped from Democratic to Republican ====
- Lake
- Las Animas
- Pueblo
