= Arriba, Colorado =

Statutory town in Lincoln County, Colorado, United States

- Statutory town
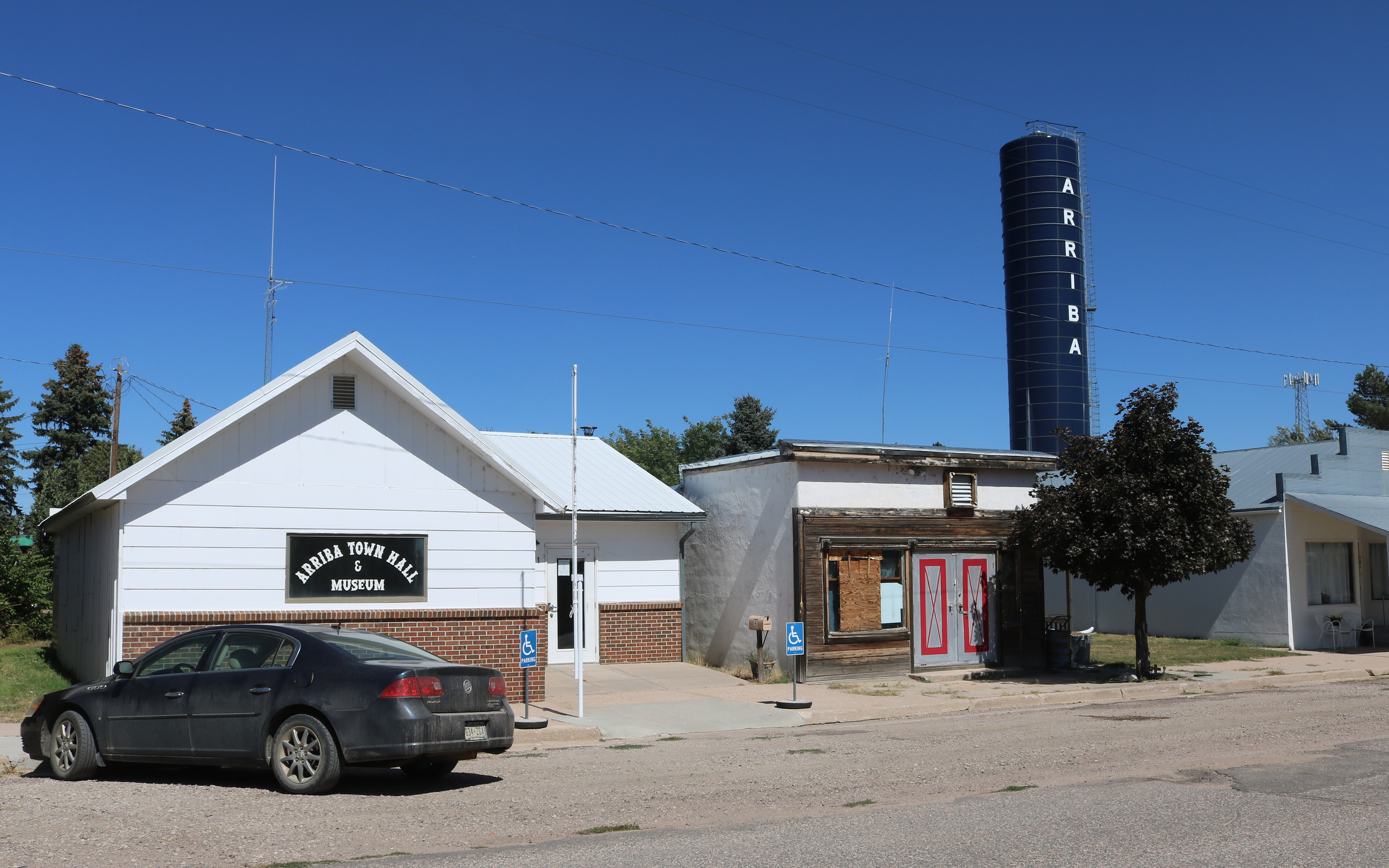
- Arriba town hall and museum (2019)

- Location within Lincoln County
- Coordinates: 39°17′04″N 103°16′27″W
- Country: United States
- State: Colorado
- County: Lincoln
- Incorporated: August 28, 1918

Government
  - Type: statutory town

Area
  - Total: 0.499 sq mi (1.292 km^{2})
  - Land: 0.499 sq mi (1.292 km^{2})
  - Water: 0 sq mi (0.000 km^{2})
- Elevation: 5,240 ft (1,600 m)

Population (2020)
  - Total: 202
  - Density: 405/sq mi (156/km^{2})
- Time zone: UTC−07:00 (MST)
  - Summer (DST): UTC−06:00 (MDT)
- ZIP Code: 80804
- Area code: 719
- GNIS town ID: 2411647
- FIPS code: FIPS 08 03235
- Website: Town of Arriba

Arriba (/ˌærɪbɑːˌ/) is a statutory town located in Lincoln County, Colorado, United States. The town population was 202 at the 2020 United States census.

== History ==
Arriba is the Spanish word for "on high" or "above others." The Arriba, Colorado, post office opened on February 4, 1889, and the Town of Arriba was incorporated on August 29, 1918.

== Geography ==
Arriba is located along Interstate 70.

At the 2020 United States census, the town had a total area of 319 acres (1.292 km^{2}), all of it land.

== Demographics ==
Historical population
Census	Pop.	Note	%±
1920	334		—
1930	337		0.9%
1940	286		−15.1%
1950	367		28.3%
1960	296		−19.3%
1970	254		−14.2%
1980	236		−7.1%
1990	220		−6.8%
2000	244		10.9%
2010	193		−20.9%
2020	202		4.7%
U.S. Decennial Census

As of the census of 2000, there were 244 people, 106 households, and 62 families residing in the town. The population density was 523.1 inhabitants per square mile (202.0/km^{2}). There were 127 housing units at an average density of 272.2 per square mile (105.1/km^{2}). The racial makeup of the town was 94.67% White, 0.82% Native American, 1.64% Asian, 2.05% from other races, and 0.82% from two or more races. Hispanic or Latino of any race were 5.74% of the population.

There were 106 households, out of which 26.4% had children under the age of 18 living with them, 48.1% were married couples living together, 6.6% had a female householder with no husband present, and 40.6% were non-families. 34.0% of all households were made up of individuals, and 17.9% had someone living alone who was 65 years of age or older. The average household size was 2.30 and the average family size was 3.05.

In the town, the population was spread out, with 25.8% under the age of 18, 6.1% from 18 to 24, 26.2% from 25 to 44, 23.4% from 45 to 64, and 18.4% who were 65 years of age or older. The median age was 41 years. For every 100 females, there were 96.8 males. For every 100 females age 18 and over, there were 96.7 males.

The median income for a household in the town was $25,000, and the median income for a family was $27,500. Males had a median income of $27,188 versus $19,000 for females. The per capita income for the town was $13,370. About 8.1% of families and 13.5% of the population were below the poverty line, including 3.0% of those under the age of eighteen and 19.6% of those 65 or over.

== Attractions ==
The Arriba Town Museum is located in the Arriba Town Hall and contains memorabilia and historic artifacts on the history of the area. Grandpa Jerry's Clown Museum started in 1986 in Sterling and moved to Arriba in 2001. The museum claims to be the largest known collection of collectible clowns (baby rattles, cookie jars, cups, salt and pepper shakers, tea sets, vases, "piggy" banks, music boxes, frames, porcelain pieces, lamps, puppets, etc.). The collection comprises items from 28 states and 13 countries. The museum has since closed.

== See also ==
- List of municipalities in Colorado
