= Egnar, Colorado =

Unincorporated community in San Miguel County, Colorado, United States

- unincorporated community
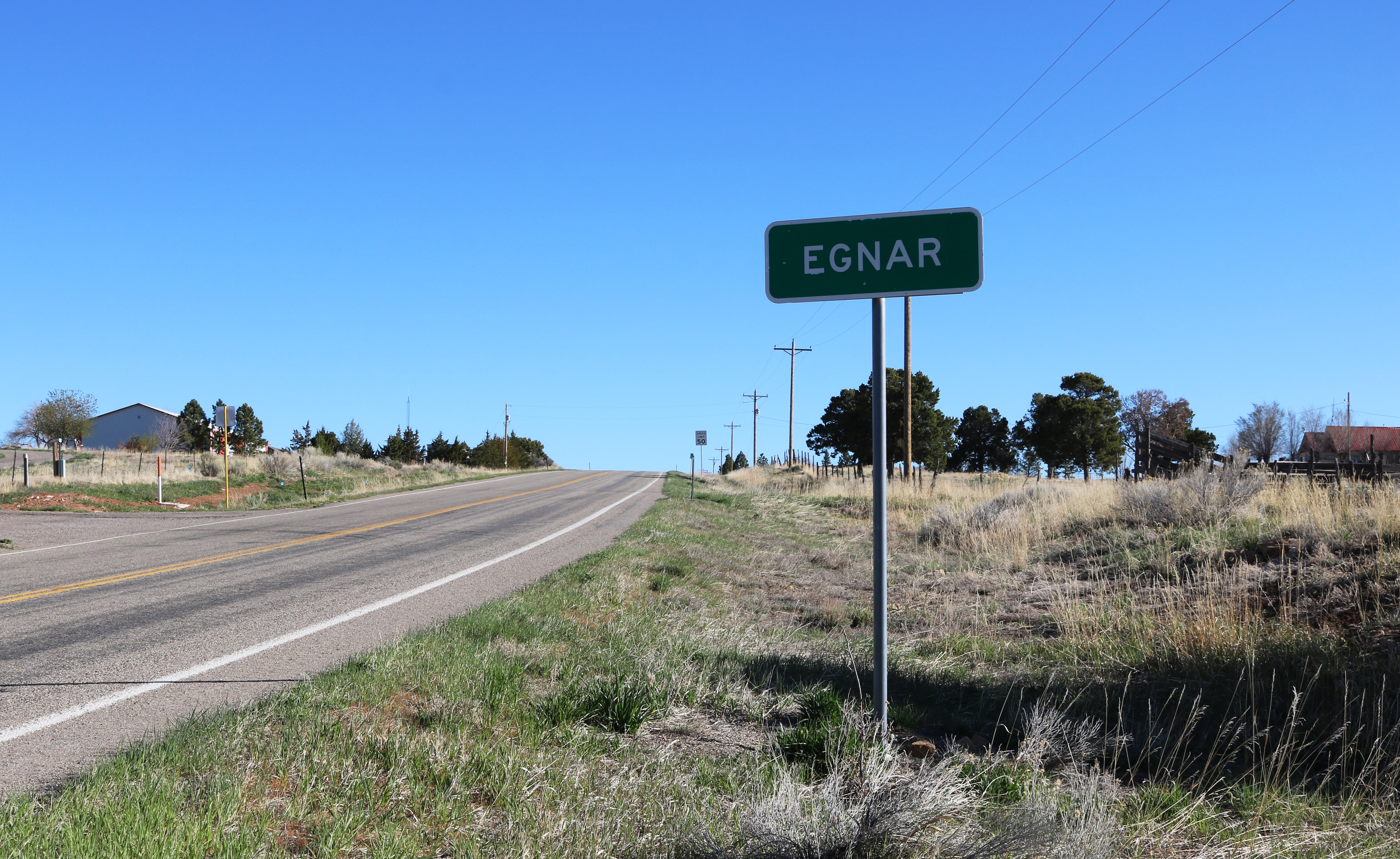
- Entering Egnar along Colorado State Highway 141 from the south, April 2020

- Location of Egnar, Colorado. Egnar (Colorado)
- Coordinates: 37°54′59″N 108°56′24″W
- Country: United States
- State: Colorado
- County: San Miguel

Government
  - Type: Unincorporated community
  - Body: San Miguel County
- Elevation: 7,330 ft (2,230 m)
- Time zone: UTC−07:00 (MST)
  - Summer (DST): UTC−06:00 (MDT)
- ZIP code: 81325
- Area codes: 970/748
- GNIS place ID: 176280

Egnar is an unincorporated community located in and governed by San Miguel County, Colorado, United States. Egnar has a U.S. Post Office with the ZIP Code 81325.

== History ==
The Egnar, Colorado, post office opened on May 28, 1917. The community's name is "Range" spelled backward.

== Geography ==
Egnar is located in far western San Miguel County near the Colorado/Utah border.
