= 1960 United States presidential election in Colorado =

- November 8, 1960

Nominee	Richard Nixon	John F. Kennedy
Party	Republican	Democratic
Home state	California	Massachusetts
Running mate	Henry Cabot Lodge Jr.	Lyndon B. Johnson
Electoral vote	6	0
Popular vote	402,242	330,629
Percentage	54.63%	44.91%
County results
Nixon
50–60%
60–70%
Kennedy
40–50%
50–60%
60–70%
President before election
Dwight D. Eisenhower
Republican
Elected President
John F. Kennedy
Democratic

The 1960 United States presidential election in Colorado took place on November 8, 1960, as part of the 1960 United States presidential election. State voters chose six representatives, or electors, to the Electoral College, who voted for president and vice president.

Colorado was won by incumbent Vice President Richard Nixon (R–California), running with United States Ambassador to the United Nations Henry Cabot Lodge Jr., with 54.63% of the popular vote, against Senator John F. Kennedy (D–Massachusetts), running with Senator Lyndon B. Johnson, with 44.91% of the popular vote.

== Results ==
1960 United States presidential election in Colorado
Party	Candidate	Votes	%
Republican	Richard Nixon	402,242	54.63%
Democratic	John F. Kennedy	330,629	44.91%
Socialist Labor	Eric Hass	2,803	0.38%
Socialist Workers	Farrell Dobbs	572	0.08%
Total votes		736,246	100%

=== By county ===
County	Richard Nixon Republican		John F. Kennedy Democratic		Eric Hass Socialist Labor		Farrell Dobbs Socialist Workers		Margin		Total votes cast
County	#	%	#	%	#	%	#	%	#	%	Total votes cast
Adams	18,452	46.36%	21,168	53.19%	164	0.41%	14	0.04%	-2,716	-6.83%	39,798
Alamosa	2,271	55.58%	1,811	44.32%	3	0.07%	1	0.02%	460	11.26%	4,086
Arapahoe	26,379	60.07%	17,400	39.62%	109	0.25%	28	0.06%	8,979	20.45%	43,916
Archuleta	489	46.26%	567	53.64%	1	0.09%	0	0.00%	-78	-7.38%	1,057
Baca	1,815	65.48%	952	34.34%	2	0.07%	3	0.11%	863	31.14%	2,772
Bent	1,671	57.54%	1,228	42.29%	4	0.14%	1	0.03%	443	15.25%	2,904
Boulder	19,791	61.47%	12,276	38.13%	105	0.33%	25	0.08%	7,515	23.34%	32,197
Chaffee	2,094	52.14%	1,918	47.76%	3	0.07%	1	0.02%	176	4.38%	4,016
Cheyenne	806	65.69%	419	34.15%	2	0.16%	0	0.00%	387	31.54%	1,227
Clear Creek	964	58.35%	688	41.65%	0	0.00%	0	0.00%	276	16.70%	1,652
Conejos	1,367	38.80%	2,069	58.73%	42	1.19%	45	1.28%	-702	-19.93%	3,523
Costilla	637	31.83%	1,351	67.52%	10	0.50%	3	0.15%	-714	-35.69%	2,001
Crowley	1,099	60.89%	705	39.06%	1	0.06%	0	0.00%	394	21.83%	1,805
Custer	509	61.85%	314	38.15%	0	0.00%	0	0.00%	195	23.70%	823
Delta	4,644	63.24%	2,689	36.62%	6	0.08%	4	0.05%	1,955	26.62%	7,343
Denver	109,446	49.59%	109,637	49.68%	1,429	0.65%	189	0.09%	-191	-0.09%	220,701
Dolores	476	55.22%	386	44.78%	0	0.00%	0	0.00%	90	10.44%	862
Douglas	1,490	64.42%	823	35.58%	0	0.00%	0	0.00%	667	28.84%	2,313
Eagle	989	52.86%	880	47.03%	2	0.11%	0	0.00%	109	5.83%	1,871
El Paso	31,625	64.93%	17,018	34.94%	40	0.08%	21	0.04%	14,607	29.99%	48,704
Elbert	1,240	64.32%	686	35.58%	2	0.10%	0	0.00%	554	28.74%	1,928
Fremont	5,690	60.19%	3,730	39.45%	13	0.14%	21	0.22%	1,960	20.74%	9,454
Garfield	3,215	58.04%	2,313	41.76%	9	0.16%	2	0.04%	902	16.28%	5,539
Gilpin	315	58.55%	223	41.45%	0	0.00%	0	0.00%	92	17.10%	538
Grand	1,104	62.62%	657	37.27%	1	0.06%	1	0.06%	447	25.35%	1,763
Gunnison	1,296	55.31%	1,044	44.56%	1	0.04%	2	0.09%	252	10.75%	2,343
Hinsdale	138	62.73%	82	37.27%	0	0.00%	0	0.00%	56	25.46%	220
Huerfano	1,367	33.73%	2,673	65.95%	8	0.20%	5	0.12%	-1,306	-32.22%	4,053
Jackson	504	58.27%	360	41.62%	1	0.12%	0	0.00%	144	16.65%	865
Jefferson	34,105	59.62%	22,962	40.14%	107	0.19%	30	0.05%	11,143	19.48%	57,204
Kiowa	865	63.42%	498	36.51%	1	0.07%	0	0.00%	367	26.91%	1,364
Kit Carson	2,248	66.88%	1,103	32.82%	2	0.06%	8	0.24%	1,145	34.06%	3,361
La Plata	4,772	58.83%	3,329	41.04%	6	0.07%	4	0.05%	1,443	17.79%	8,111
Lake	954	34.03%	1,842	65.72%	2	0.07%	5	0.18%	-888	-31.69%	2,803
Larimer	15,671	67.39%	7,550	32.47%	23	0.10%	11	0.05%	8,121	34.92%	23,255
Las Animas	2,989	30.74%	6,704	68.96%	15	0.15%	14	0.14%	-3,715	-38.22%	9,722
Lincoln	1,498	58.93%	1,041	40.95%	3	0.12%	0	0.00%	457	17.98%	2,542
Logan	5,002	59.97%	3,334	39.97%	1	0.01%	4	0.05%	1,668	20.00%	8,341
Mesa	13,015	58.81%	9,072	40.99%	32	0.14%	13	0.06%	3,943	17.82%	22,132
Mineral	146	47.87%	158	51.80%	1	0.33%	0	0.00%	-12	-3.93%	305
Moffat	1,754	59.32%	1,200	40.58%	2	0.07%	1	0.03%	554	18.74%	2,343
Montezuma	2,778	56.69%	2,115	43.16%	5	0.10%	2	0.04%	663	13.53%	4,900
Montrose	4,040	58.34%	2,861	41.31%	17	0.25%	7	0.10%	1,179	17.03%	6,925
Morgan	5,092	61.65%	3,151	38.15%	11	0.13%	5	0.06%	1,941	23.50%	8,259
Otero	6,015	58.80%	4,199	41.05%	7	0.07%	8	0.08%	1,816	17.75%	10,229
Ouray	508	54.04%	432	45.96%	0	0.00%	0	0.00%	76	8.08%	940
Park	642	59.33%	438	40.48%	2	0.18%	0	0.00%	204	18.85%	1,082
Phillips	1,455	62.77%	862	37.19%	1	0.04%	0	0.00%	593	25.58%	2,318
Pitkin	679	58.18%	488	41.82%	0	0.00%	0	0.00%	191	16.36%	1,167
Prowers	3,567	59.15%	2,457	40.75%	3	0.05%	3	0.05%	1,110	18.40%	6,030
Pueblo	20,579	42.36%	27,421	56.44%	541	1.11%	41	0.08%	-6,842	-14.08%	48,582
Rio Blanco	1,391	63.57%	794	36.29%	2	0.09%	1	0.05%	597	27.28%	2,188
Rio Grande	2,524	58.53%	1,782	41.33%	5	0.12%	1	0.02%	742	17.20%	4,312
Routt	1,651	53.83%	1,414	46.10%	1	0.03%	1	0.03%	237	7.73%	3,067
Saguache	956	49.05%	984	50.49%	6	0.31%	3	0.15%	-28	-1.44%	1,949
San Juan	218	45.23%	261	54.15%	3	0.62%	0	0.00%	-43	-8.92%	482
San Miguel	525	46.09%	612	53.73%	2	0.18%	0	0.00%	-87	-7.64%	1,139
Sedgwick	1,230	61.41%	769	38.39%	3	0.15%	1	0.05%	461	23.02%	2,003
Summit	424	51.27%	400	48.37%	3	0.36%	0	0.00%	24	2.90%	827
Teller	723	53.60%	622	46.11%	3	0.22%	1	0.07%	101	7.49%	1,349
Washington	1,979	65.49%	1,039	34.38%	3	0.01%	1	0.03%	940	31.11%	3,022
Weld	17,558	60.99%	11,179	38.83%	30	0.10%	23	0.08%	6,379	22.16%	28,790
Yuma	2,806	65.18%	1,489	34.59%	5	0.12%	5	0.12%	1,317	30.59%	4,305
Total	402,242	54.63%	330,629	44.91%	2,803	0.38%	572	0.08%	71,613	9.72%	736,246

==== Counties that flipped from Republican to Democratic ====
- Saguache
- Las Animas
- Pueblo
- Conejos
- Adams
- Archuleta
- Denver
- Lake
- Mineral
- San Juan
- San Miguel
