= 1980 United States presidential election in Colorado =

- November 4, 1980

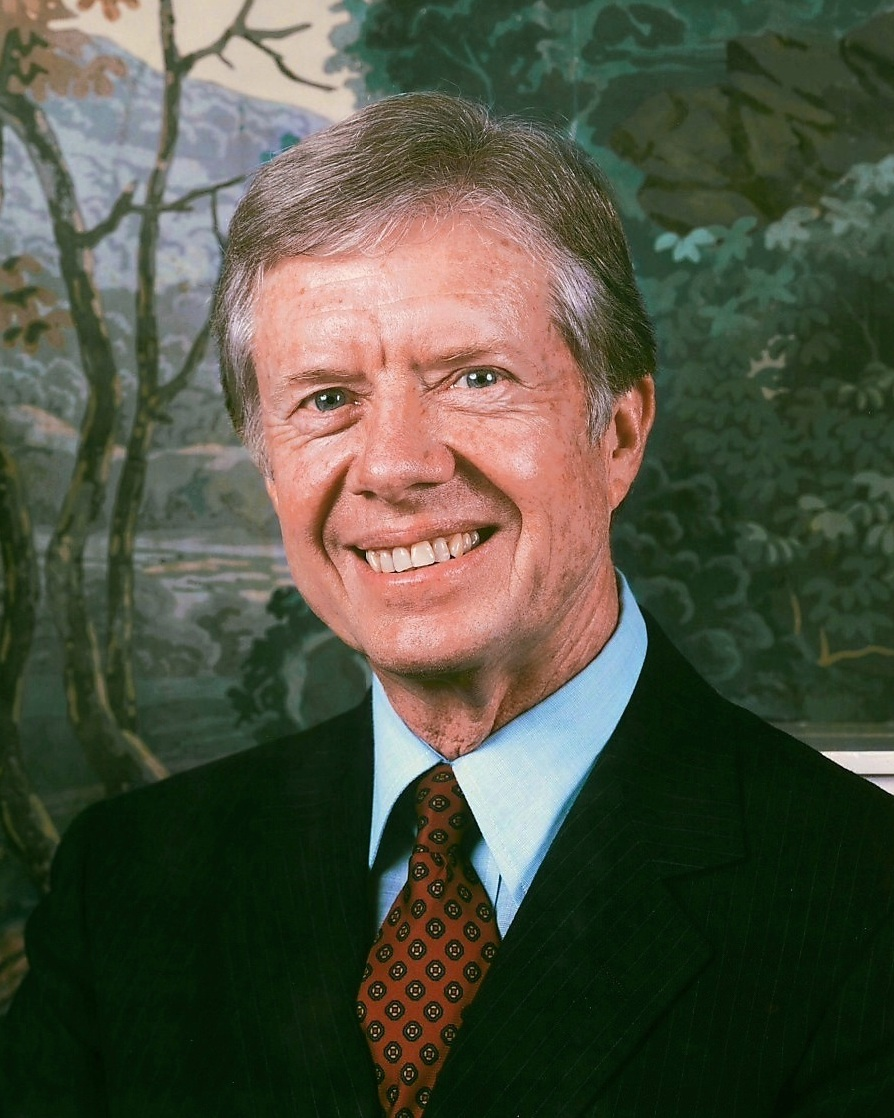

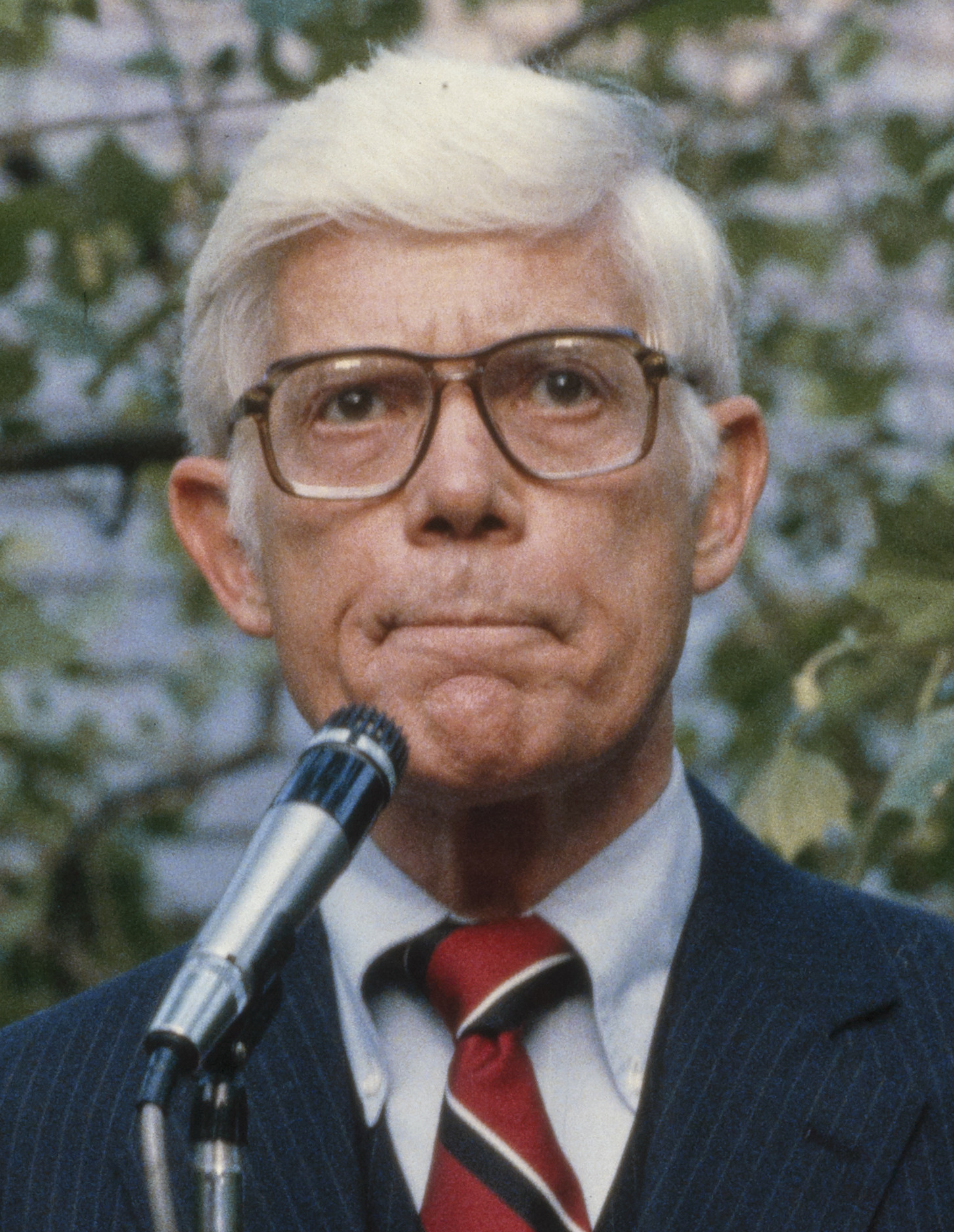
Nominee	Ronald Reagan	Jimmy Carter	John B. Anderson
Party	Republican	Democratic	National Unity
Home state	California	Georgia	Illinois
Running mate	George H. W. Bush	Walter Mondale	Patrick Lucey
Electoral vote	7	0	0
Popular vote	652,264	367,973	130,633
Percentage	55.07%	31.07%	11.03%
County results
Reagan
30–40%
40–50%
50–60%
60–70%
70–80%
Carter
40–50%
50–60%
60–70%
President before election
Jimmy Carter
Democratic
Elected President
Ronald Reagan
Republican

The 1980 United States presidential election in Colorado took place on November 4, 1980. All 50 states and The District of Columbia, were part of the 1980 United States presidential election. State voters chose seven electors to the Electoral College, who voted for president and vice president.

Colorado was won by the Republican Party candidate, former California Governor Ronald Reagan by a landslide of 24 points, defeating Democratic incumbent president Jimmy Carter. John B. Anderson, an Illinois Republican congressman running on the National Unity ticket, received 11% of the vote.

As of the 2024 presidential election, this is the last occasion where a Republican candidate carried the City and County of Denver. Since then, Denver has remained a reliable Democratic stronghold in presidential elections, which would eventually cause the state to flip consistently Democratic from 2008 onward.

== Results ==
Presidential Candidate	Running Mate	Party	Electoral Vote (EV)	Popular Vote (PV)	
Ronald Reagan of California	George H. W. Bush	Republican	7	652,264	55.07%
Jimmy Carter (incumbent)	Walter Mondale (incumbent)	Democratic	0	367,973	31.07%
John B. Anderson	Patrick Lucey	National Unity	0	130,633	11.03%
Ed Clark	David Koch	Libertarian	0	25,744	2.17%
Barry Commoner	LaDonna Harris	Citizens	0	5,614	0.47%
Benjamin Bubar	Earl Dodge	Statesman	0	1,180	0.10%
Andrew Pulley	Matilde Zimmermann	Socialist Workers	0	520	0.04%
Gus Hall	Angela Davis	Communist	0	487	0.04%

=== By county ===
County	Ronald Reagan Republican		Jimmy Carter Democratic		John B. Anderson Independent		Ed Clark Libertarian		Various candidates Other parties		Margin		Total votes cast
County	#	%	#	%	#	%	#	%	#	%	#	%	Total votes cast
Adams	42,916	50.50%	31,357	36.90%	8,342	9.82%	2,044	2.41%	316	0.37%	11,559	13.60%	84,975
Alamosa	2,601	53.87%	1,821	37.72%	289	5.99%	96	1.99%	21	0.43%	780	16.15%	4,828
Arapahoe	79,594	62.19%	30,148	23.56%	15,329	11.98%	2,307	1.80%	602	0.47%	49,446	38.63%	127,980
Archuleta	1,252	65.89%	532	28.00%	83	4.37%	30	1.58%	3	0.16%	720	37.89%	1,900
Baca	1,999	74.26%	551	20.47%	106	3.94%	35	1.30%	1	0.04%	1,448	53.79%	2,692
Bent	1,206	51.76%	894	38.37%	164	7.04%	42	1.80%	24	1.03%	312	13.39%	2,330
Boulder	40,698	46.74%	28,422	32.64%	13,712	15.75%	2,630	3.02%	1,607	1.85%	12,276	14.10%	87,069
Chaffee	3,327	60.73%	1,583	28.90%	432	7.89%	102	1.86%	34	0.62%	1,744	31.83%	5,478
Cheyenne	816	65.86%	322	25.99%	76	6.13%	19	1.53%	6	0.48%	494	39.87%	1,239
Clear Creek	1,784	56.22%	837	26.38%	402	12.67%	126	3.97%	24	0.76%	947	29.84%	3,173
Conejos	1,597	49.41%	1,503	46.50%	90	2.78%	40	1.24%	2	0.06%	94	2.91%	3,232
Costilla	489	30.89%	1,036	65.45%	38	2.40%	15	0.95%	5	0.32%	-547	-34.56%	1,583
Crowley	926	62.86%	472	32.04%	57	3.87%	17	1.15%	1	0.07%	454	30.82%	1,473
Custer	674	66.73%	231	22.87%	59	5.84%	41	4.06%	5	0.50%	443	43.86%	1,010
Delta	6,179	66.97%	2,348	25.45%	455	4.93%	160	1.73%	85	0.92%	3,831	41.52%	9,227
Denver	88,398	42.19%	85,903	41.00%	28,610	13.66%	4,435	2.12%	2,162	1.03%	2,495	1.19%	209,508
Dolores	615	75.28%	157	19.22%	32	3.92%	12	1.47%	1	0.12%	458	56.06%	817
Douglas	8,126	70.08%	2,108	18.18%	1,058	9.12%	266	2.29%	38	0.33%	6,018	51.90%	11,596
Eagle	3,061	52.63%	1,608	27.65%	906	15.58%	193	3.32%	48	0.83%	1,453	24.98%	5,816
El Paso	66,199	63.66%	27,463	26.41%	7,886	7.58%	2,042	1.96%	400	0.38%	38,736	37.25%	103,990
Elbert	2,107	67.49%	698	22.36%	238	7.62%	74	2.37%	5	0.16%	1,409	45.13%	3,122
Fremont	7,162	59.13%	3,952	32.63%	731	6.03%	199	1.64%	69	0.57%	3,210	26.50%	12,113
Garfield	5,416	58.08%	2,639	28.30%	978	10.49%	226	2.42%	66	0.71%	2,777	29.78%	9,325
Gilpin	694	50.04%	441	31.80%	175	12.62%	55	3.97%	22	1.59%	253	18.24%	1,387
Grand	2,133	61.28%	820	23.56%	413	11.86%	102	2.93%	13	0.37%	1,313	37.72%	3,481
Gunnison	2,756	55.45%	1,297	26.10%	704	14.16%	135	2.72%	78	1.57%	1,459	29.35%	4,970
Hinsdale	232	69.05%	76	22.62%	13	3.87%	12	3.57%	3	0.89%	156	46.43%	336
Huerfano	1,258	41.49%	1,574	51.91%	146	4.82%	22	0.73%	32	1.06%	-316	-10.42%	3,032
Jackson	673	63.55%	283	26.72%	80	7.55%	21	1.98%	2	0.19%	390	36.83%	1,059
Jefferson	97,008	59.66%	41,525	25.54%	19,530	12.01%	3,929	2.42%	619	0.38%	55,483	34.12%	162,611
Kiowa	754	65.06%	331	28.56%	61	5.26%	12	1.04%	1	0.09%	423	36.50%	1,159
Kit Carson	2,622	71.78%	790	21.63%	185	5.06%	52	1.42%	4	0.11%	1,832	50.15%	3,653
La Plata	7,291	59.76%	3,034	24.87%	1,537	12.60%	225	1.84%	114	0.93%	4,257	34.89%	12,201
Lake	1,375	45.45%	1,213	40.10%	289	9.55%	120	3.97%	28	0.93%	162	5.35%	3,025
Larimer	36,240	56.51%	17,072	26.62%	8,887	13.86%	1,484	2.31%	446	0.70%	19,168	29.89%	64,129
Las Animas	2,917	39.37%	4,117	55.57%	278	3.75%	90	1.21%	7	0.09%	-1,200	-16.20%	7,409
Lincoln	1,535	64.74%	602	25.39%	175	7.38%	57	2.40%	2	0.08%	933	39.35%	2,371
Logan	5,238	63.16%	2,332	28.12%	588	7.09%	122	1.47%	13	0.16%	2,906	35.04%	8,293
Mesa	22,686	68.92%	7,549	22.93%	2,004	6.09%	582	1.77%	95	0.29%	15,137	45.99%	32,916
Mineral	271	60.22%	125	27.78%	41	9.11%	13	2.89%	0	0.00%	146	32.44%	450
Moffat	3,344	67.90%	1,079	21.91%	329	6.68%	139	2.82%	34	0.69%	2,265	45.99%	4,925
Montezuma	4,120	68.60%	1,467	24.43%	275	4.58%	124	2.06%	20	0.33%	2,653	44.17%	6,006
Montrose	6,685	68.21%	2,232	22.78%	635	6.48%	225	2.30%	23	0.23%	4,453	45.43%	9,800
Morgan	5,209	62.50%	2,246	26.95%	693	8.32%	136	1.63%	50	0.60%	2,963	35.55%	8,334
Otero	4,801	54.55%	3,294	37.43%	572	6.50%	99	1.12%	35	0.40%	1,507	17.12%	8,801
Ouray	813	67.69%	237	19.73%	129	10.74%	14	1.17%	8	0.67%	576	47.96%	1,201
Park	1,623	59.34%	674	24.64%	293	10.71%	122	4.46%	23	0.84%	949	34.70%	2,735
Phillips	1,488	63.21%	640	27.19%	193	8.20%	29	1.23%	4	0.17%	848	36.02%	2,354
Pitkin	2,153	39.75%	1,760	32.49%	1,128	20.82%	285	5.26%	91	1.68%	393	7.26%	5,417
Prowers	3,115	59.77%	1,669	32.02%	340	6.52%	57	1.09%	31	0.59%	1,446	27.75%	5,212
Pueblo	20,770	44.72%	21,874	47.10%	3,102	6.68%	585	1.26%	110	0.24%	-1,104	-2.38%	46,441
Rio Blanco	1,971	74.46%	462	17.45%	143	5.40%	63	2.38%	8	0.30%	1,509	57.01%	2,647
Rio Grande	2,844	63.37%	1,370	30.53%	185	4.12%	84	1.87%	5	0.11%	1,474	32.84%	4,488
Routt	3,574	53.33%	1,944	29.01%	920	13.73%	230	3.43%	34	0.51%	1,630	24.32%	6,702
Saguache	1,124	52.65%	893	41.83%	71	3.33%	41	1.92%	6	0.28%	231	10.82%	2,135
San Juan	268	48.82%	146	26.59%	94	17.12%	36	6.56%	5	0.91%	122	22.23%	549
San Miguel	774	42.79%	651	35.99%	297	16.42%	55	3.04%	32	1.77%	123	6.80%	1,809
Sedgwick	1,151	67.39%	438	25.64%	100	5.85%	15	0.88%	4	0.23%	713	41.75%	1,708
Summit	2,027	46.54%	1,285	29.51%	845	19.40%	167	3.83%	31	0.71%	742	17.03%	4,355
Teller	2,457	66.28%	802	21.63%	322	8.69%	107	2.89%	19	0.51%	1,655	44.65%	3,707
Washington	2,007	71.40%	568	20.21%	160	5.69%	70	2.49%	6	0.21%	1,439	51.19%	2,811
Weld	23,901	58.80%	11,433	28.13%	4,309	10.60%	790	1.94%	213	0.52%	12,468	30.67%	40,646
Yuma	3,220	68.89%	1,043	22.31%	319	6.82%	87	1.86%	5	0.11%	2,177	46.58%	4,674
Total	652,264	55.07%	367,973	31.07%	130,633	11.03%	25,744	2.17%	7,801	0.65%	284,291	24.00%	1,184,415

==== Counties that flipped from Democratic to Republican ====
- Adams
- Bent
- Cheyenne
- Conejos
- Denver
- Dolores
- Gilpin
- Phillips
- Prowers
- San Miguel

=== Results by congressional district ===
District	Reagan	Carter	Representative
1st	44.3%	41.1%	Pat Schroeder
2nd	55.5%	31.0%	Tim Wirth
3rd	56.5%	36.5%	Ray Kogovsek
4th	60.0%	28.8%	James Paul Johnson (96th Congress)
4th	60.0%	28.8%	Hank Brown (97th Congress)
5th	63.5%	26.3%	Ken Kramer
