= 1972 United States presidential election in Colorado =

- November 7, 1972

Nominee	Richard Nixon	George McGovern
Party	Republican	Democratic
Home state	California	South Dakota
Running mate	Spiro Agnew	Sargent Shriver
Electoral vote	7	0
Popular vote	597,189	329,980
Percentage	62.61%	34.59%
County results
Nixon
50–60%
60–70%
70–80%
McGovern
50–60%
President before election
Richard Nixon
Republican
Elected President
Richard Nixon
Republican

The 1972 United States presidential election in Colorado took place on November 7, 1972, as part of the 1972 United States presidential election. State voters chose seven representatives, or electors, to the Electoral College, who voted for president and vice president.

Colorado voted for the Republican incumbent, Richard Nixon, over the Democratic challenger, South Dakota Senator George McGovern. Nixon took 62.61% of the vote to McGovern's 34.59%, a margin of 28.01 points.

Like most of the rest of the Mountain West, Colorado voted powerfully Republican in 1972, giving Nixon a margin in excess of his national margin by 4.8%. Nevertheless, Pitkin County, home to Aspen, shifted powerfully against the national trend, switching from supporting Nixon in 1968 to supporting McGovern in 1972, one of six counties outside of McGovern's home state of South Dakota to do so. Nixon thus became the first Republican to win the White House without carrying Pitkin County since William Howard Taft in 1908.

== Results ==
1972 United States presidential election in Colorado
Party	Candidate	Votes	Percentage	Electoral votes
Republican	Richard Nixon (incumbent)	597,189	62.61%	7
Democratic	George McGovern	329,980	34.59%	0
American Independent	John G. Schmitz	17,269	1.81%	0
Socialist Labor	Louis Fisher	4,361	0.46%	0
People's	Benjamin Spock	2,403	0.25%	0
Libertarian	John Hospers	1,111	0.12%	0
Socialist Workers	Linda Jenness	666	0.07%	0
Prohibition	E. Harold Munn	467	0.05%	0
Communist	Gus Hall	432	0.05%	0
Write-ins	Scattered (write-ins)	6	0.00%	0
Totals		953,884	100.00%	7
Voter turnout				—

=== By county ===
County	Richard Nixon Republican		George McGovern Democratic		John G. Schmitz American Independent		Various candidates Other parties		Margin		Total votes cast
County	#	%	#	%	#	%	#	%	#	%	Total votes cast
Adams	40,372	60.79%	24,170	36.39%	1,133	1.71%	737	1.11%	16,202	24.40%	66,412
Alamosa	2,916	62.51%	1,540	33.01%	191	4.09%	18	0.39%	1,376	29.50%	4,665
Arapahoe	52,283	72.24%	18,631	25.74%	816	1.13%	646	0.89%	33,652	46.50%	72,376
Archuleta	606	64.47%	300	31.91%	30	3.19%	4	0.43%	306	32.56%	940
Baca	1,645	73.93%	527	23.69%	50	2.25%	3	0.13%	1,118	50.24%	2,225
Bent	1,525	64.29%	787	33.18%	52	2.19%	8	0.34%	738	31.11%	2,372
Boulder	40,766	56.80%	29,484	41.08%	837	1.17%	683	0.95%	11,282	15.72%	71,770
Chaffee	2,859	66.63%	1,354	31.55%	45	1.05%	33	0.77%	1,505	35.08%	4,291
Cheyenne	815	63.37%	400	31.10%	68	5.29%	3	0.24%	415	32.27%	1,286
Clear Creek	1,557	62.23%	815	32.57%	94	3.76%	36	1.44%	742	29.66%	2,502
Conejos	1,658	55.51%	1,140	38.17%	184	6.16%	5	0.15%	518	17.34%	2,987
Costilla	602	42.16%	744	52.10%	18	1.26%	64	4.48%	-142	-9.94%	1,428
Crowley	1,094	70.67%	414	26.74%	35	2.26%	5	0.32%	680	43.93%	1,548
Custer	495	71.43%	154	22.22%	43	6.20%	1	0.14%	341	49.21%	693
Delta	4,890	67.73%	1,903	26.36%	396	5.48%	31	0.43%	2,987	41.37%	7,220
Denver	121,995	54.14%	98,062	43.52%	2,306	1.02%	2,972	1.32%	23,933	10.62%	225,335
Dolores	498	71.76%	166	23.92%	28	4.03%	2	0.28%	332	47.84%	694
Douglas	3,625	75.52%	1,048	21.83%	100	2.08%	27	0.28%	2,577	53.69%	4,800
Eagle	1,920	58.16%	1,306	39.56%	50	1.51%	25	0.77%	614	18.60%	3,301
El Paso	53,892	69.11%	21,234	27.23%	2,262	2.90%	597	0.76%	32,658	41.88%	77,985
Elbert	1,416	73.29%	451	23.34%	56	2.90%	9	0.47%	965	49.95%	1,932
Fremont	6,701	68.41%	2,813	28.72%	248	2.53%	33	0.34%	3,888	39.69%	9,795
Garfield	4,452	66.27%	2,088	31.08%	143	2.13%	35	0.51%	2,364	35.19%	6,718
Gilpin	516	57.02%	362	40.00%	19	2.10%	8	0.88%	154	17.02%	905
Grand	1,721	69.93%	685	27.83%	40	1.63%	15	0.61%	1,036	42.10%	2,461
Gunnison	2,231	63.60%	1,187	33.84%	58	1.65%	32	0.91%	1,044	29.76%	3,508
Hinsdale	172	77.48%	44	19.82%	5	2.25%	1	0.45%	128	57.66%	222
Huerfano	1,620	53.52%	1,341	44.30%	48	1.59%	18	0.59%	279	9.22%	3,027
Jackson	623	76.72%	178	21.92%	7	0.86%	4	0.50%	445	54.80%	812
Jefferson	80,082	69.88%	31,555	27.54%	1,813	1.58%	1,147	0.32%	48,527	42.34%	114,597
Kiowa	849	67.92%	372	29.76%	27	2.16%	2	0.16%	477	38.16%	1,250
Kit Carson	2,316	70.89%	824	25.22%	124	3.80%	3	0.09%	1,492	45.67%	3,267
La Plata	5,691	62.24%	2,830	30.95%	575	6.29%	48	0.52%	2,861	31.29%	9,144
Lake	1,556	53.67%	1,263	43.57%	28	0.97%	52	1.79%	293	10.10%	2,899
Larimer	27,462	65.02%	13,731	32.51%	658	1.56%	383	0.91%	13,731	32.51%	42,234
Las Animas	3,659	52.59%	3,222	46.31%	59	0.85%	17	0.25%	437	6.28%	6,957
Lincoln	1,678	70.03%	685	28.59%	28	1.17%	5	0.20%	993	41.44%	2,396
Logan	5,352	67.27%	2,426	30.49%	150	1.89%	28	0.36%	2,926	36.78%	7,956
Mesa	15,527	68.66%	6,358	28.12%	628	2.78%	100	0.44%	9,169	40.54%	22,613
Mineral	247	70.98%	96	27.59%	4	1.15%	1	0.29%	151	43.39%	348
Moffat	1,928	67.70%	591	20.75%	329	11.15%	0	0.00%	1,337	46.95%	2,848
Montezuma	3,391	73.49%	1,223	26.51%	0	0.00%	0	0.00%	2,168	46.98%	4,614
Montrose	4,571	64.75%	1,870	26.49%	585	8.29%	33	0.47%	2,701	38.26%	7,059
Morgan	5,365	70.40%	2,081	27.31%	138	1.81%	37	0.48%	3,284	43.09%	7,621
Otero	6,016	65.75%	2,929	32.01%	70	0.77%	135	1.47%	3,087	33.74%	9,060
Ouray	669	74.58%	186	20.74%	33	3.68%	9	1.00%	483	53.84%	897
Park	1,001	70.29%	386	27.11%	23	1.62%	14	0.98%	615	43.18%	1,424
Phillips	1,480	65.31%	687	30.32%	94	4.15%	5	0.21%	793	34.99%	2,266
Pitkin	2,064	44.16%	2,531	54.15%	33	0.71%	46	0.98%	-467	-9.99%	4,674
Prowers	3,272	61.58%	1,860	35.01%	159	2.99%	22	0.42%	1,412	26.57%	5,313
Pueblo	25,607	54.43%	19,620	41.70%	1,113	2.37%	705	1.50%	5,987	12.73%	47,045
Rio Blanco	1,586	77.25%	414	20.17%	46	2.24%	7	0.34%	1,172	57.08%	2,053
Rio Grande	2,787	69.69%	1,029	25.73%	171	4.28%	12	0.30%	1,758	43.96%	3,999
Routt	2,629	59.33%	1,613	36.40%	159	3.59%	30	0.68%	1,016	22.93%	4,431
Saguache	1,062	63.18%	578	34.38%	38	2.26%	3	0.18%	484	28.80%	1,681
San Juan	238	58.33%	140	34.31%	28	6.86%	2	0.50%	98	24.02%	408
San Miguel	583	54.95%	426	40.15%	42	3.96%	10	0.94%	157	14.80%	1,061
Sedgwick	1,129	67.85%	485	29.15%	43	2.58%	7	0.42%	644	38.70%	1,664
Summit	1,082	59.03%	707	38.57%	14	0.76%	30	1.64%	375	20.46%	1,833
Teller	1,440	70.45%	535	26.17%	50	2.45%	19	0.93%	905	44.28%	2,044
Washington	1,837	69.87%	643	24.46%	135	5.14%	14	0.53%	1,194	45.41%	2,629
Weld	24,695	66.29%	11,690	31.38%	416	1.12%	454	1.21%	13,005	34.91%	37,255
Yuma	2,873	71.03%	1,066	26.35%	94	2.32%	12	0.30%	1,807	44.68%	4,045
Total	597,189	62.61%	329,980	34.59%	17,269	1.81%	9,446	0.99%	267,209	28.02%	953,884
