= Crown Hill =

Crown Hill may refer to:

Canada

- Crown Hill, Ontario

New Zealand

- Crown Hill, New Zealand, in Auckland

United States

- Crown Hill Park in Jefferson County, Colorado
- Crown Hill, South Dakota, a ghost town
- Crown Hill, Seattle, Washington
- Crown Hill, West Virginia

== See also ==
- Crown Hill Cemetery (disambiguation)
