= Crown Hill Park =

Park in Colorado, United States

Coordinates: 39°45′35″N 105°05′53″W

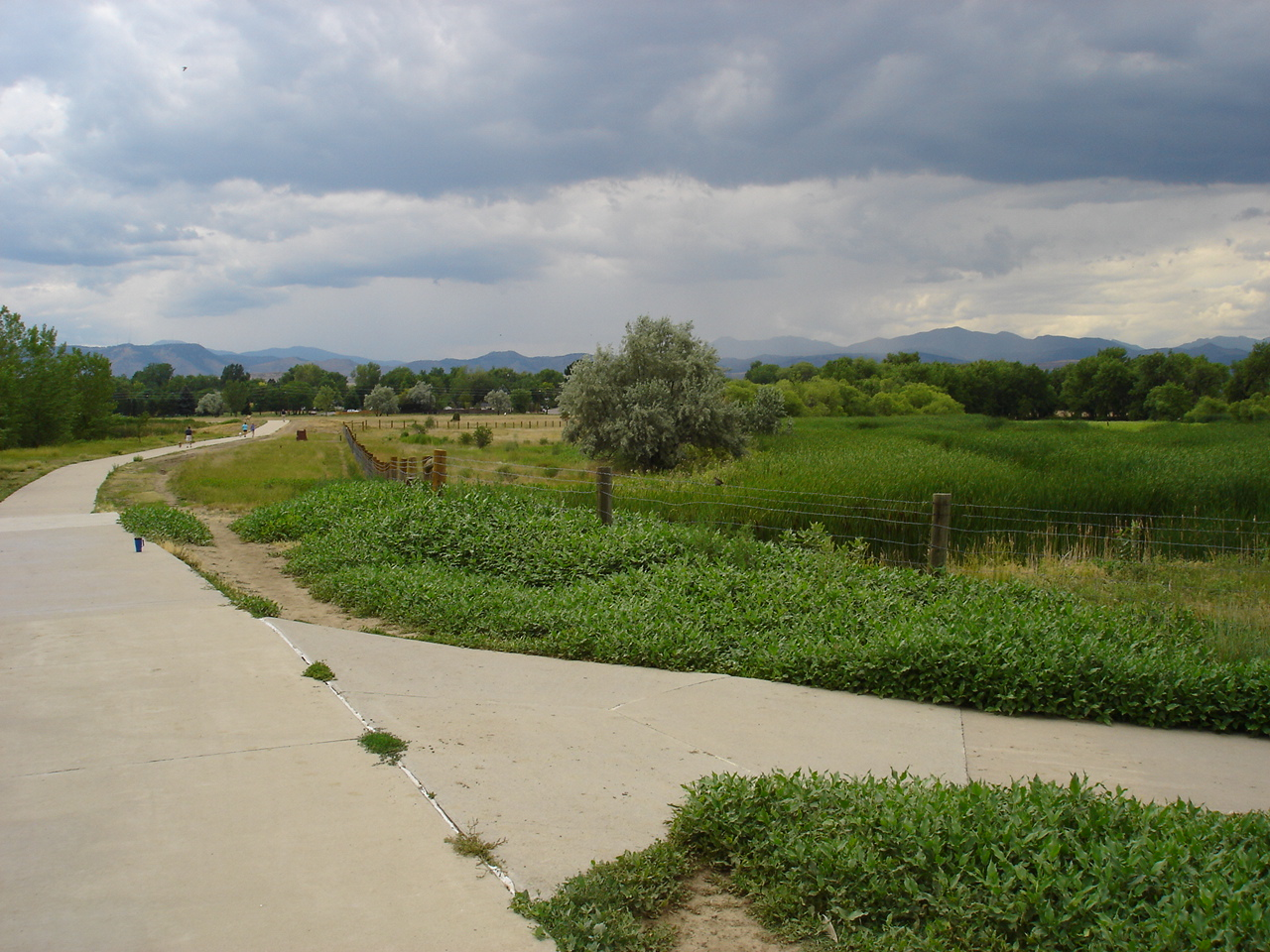
Crown Hill Park, overlooking the wildlife refuge and grasslands with the Rocky Mountains on the horizon.

Crown Hill Park is a 242-acre (0.98 km^{2}) recreation area operated by Jefferson County Open Space in unincorporated Jefferson County, Colorado. The park is located between the cities of Wheat Ridge and Lakewood. Within the borders of the park is a National Urban Wildlife Refuge. Activities at the park include picnicking, hiking, biking, horseback riding, wildlife viewing, walking, roller blading, jogging, and fishing.

== Accessibility ==
Crown Hill Park is located in a highly developed region of Jefferson County in close proximity to Denver, Colorado. It is convenient to many of the transportation networks in the metro area, including

=== RTD (Regional Transportation District) ===
- Bus # 76 runs along Wadsworth Boulevard, 1-mile (1.6 km) from the park's eastern border.
- Bus # 100 runs along Kipling Parkway, on the park's western border.
- Bus # 28 and # 32 run along W 26th and W 32nd Avenues respectively, but end at Wadsworth, now making them no closer than the 76.

(The 28 and 32 bus routes previous to COVID-19 service reductions both continued west of Wadsworth, but in 2021 they don't.)

=== Automobile ===
Crown Hill Park is located 2 miles (3.2 km) south of I70 at exit 267, and 2 miles (3.2 km) east of I70 at exit 264. Denver and I25 are located 5 miles (8.0 km) east, and may be conveniently reached via Colfax Avenue/Business Route 70. The park lies along 2 major thoroughfares, Kipling Parkway and Wadsworth Boulevard. For those arriving by car, the park features 6 ADA accessible parking spaces.

=== Bicycle ===
The cities of Lakewood and Wheat Ridge maintain 2 on-street bike routes, along the southern border of the park on West 26th Avenue, and along the park's western border on Kipling Parkway

=== Horseback ===
Signs are posted along West 26th Avenue advising motorists to exercise caution for those visiting the park by horse. The park features a horse arena beside the dedicated parking lot for equestrian activities.

== Facilities ==
ADA accessible picnic shelter, with ADA accessible fishing pier visible through table.

- 3 miles (4.8 km) of natural surface trail
- 6.5 miles (10.5 km) of hard surface trail
- Flush restroom and drinking fountain, ADA accessible
- 2 small picnic shelters, each with one ADA accessible picnic table; 1 at main parking lot, 1 overlooking Kestrel Pond
- 18 park benches
- 8 picnic tables, 1 ADA accessible in each picnic shelter
- Horse hitching rail near restroom
- Horse exercise arena maintained by the City of Lakewood
- ADA accessible fishing pier
- Fitness trail; Wells Fargo Gamefield course installed with the support of the East Jeffco Kiwanis
- 2 asphalt parking lots; 1 lot with 103 parking spaces plus 5 ADA accessible, equestrian parking lot with 13 parking spaces plus 1 ADA accessible and 2 horse trailer spaces

== Ecology ==
=== Flora ===
Crown Hill Park's general lack of vegetative diversity is the legacy of its agricultural past. 85% of the cover is non-native grasslands; the remaining 15% are wetland/riparian.

==== Graminoids ====
(Grasses, grass-like plants)

- Canada bluegrass ([Poa compressa])
- Canada wildrye (Elymus canadensis) - native
- cheatgrass (Bromus tectorum)
- crested wheatgrass (Agropyron cristatum)
- fescue (Festuca sp.)
- foxtail barley (Hordeum jubatum) - native
- goatgrass (Aegilops cylindrica)
- green needlegrass (Nassella viridula) - native
- intermediate wheatgrass (Thinopyrum intermedium, syn. Elytrigia intermedia)
- Japanese brome (Bromus japonicus)
- Kentucky bluegrass (Poa pratensis)
- orchardgrass (Dactylis glomerata)
- quackgrass (Agropyron repens)
- rye (Secale cereale)
- sand dropseed (Sporobolus cryptandrus) - native
- slender wheatgrass (Elymus trachycaulus) - native
- smooth brome (Bromus inermis)
- sedge (Carex sp.) - native
- spikerush (Eleocharis sp.) - native
- tall wheatgrass (Elytrigia elongata)
- timothy (Phleum pratense)
- western wheatgrass (Agropyron smithii) - native
- wild oats (Avena fatua ssp. sativa)

==== Forbs ====

(Non-woody flowering plant that is not a grass)

- alfalfa (Medicago sativa)
- alyssum (Alyssum minus)
- asparagus (Asparagus officinalis)
- aster (Aster sp.) - native
- bindweed (Convolvulus arvensis)
- black medic (Medicago lupulina)
- Canada thistle (Cirsium arvense)
- cattails (Typha sp.) - native
- cf. coreopsis (Coreopsis tinctoria) - native
- clasping peppergrass (Lepidium perfoliatum)
- copper mallow (Sphaeralcea coccinea) - native
- curly dock (Rumex crispus)
- Dalmatian toadflax (Linaria dalmatica)
- dandelion (Taraxacum officinale)
- false flax (Camelina microcarpa)
- false salsify (Scorzonera (Podospermum) laciniatum)
- fieldcress (Neolepia campestre)
- fleabane (Erigeron divergens) - native
- fogfruit (Phyla (Lippia) cuneifolia) - native
- giant ragweed (Ambrosia trifida)
- goosefoot (Chenopodium sp.)
- groundcherry (Physalis sp.) - native
- gumweed (Grindelia squarrosa) - native
- hairy evening-primrose (Oenothera villosa) - native
- hairy vetch (Vicia villosa)
- horseweed (Conyza canadensis)
- Jimm Hill mustard (Sisymbrium altissimum)
- kochia (Kochia scoparia)
- mallow (Malva neglecta)
- mullein (Verbascum thapsus)
- musk thistle (Carduus nutans)
- narrow-leaf plantain (Plantago lanceolata)
- oyster plant (Tragopogon porrifolius)
- pennycress (Thlaspi arvense)
- poison hemlock (Conium maculatum)
- prickly lettuce (Lactuca serriola)
- ragweed (Ambrosia sp.)
- red clover (Trifolium pratense)
- salsify (Tragopogon dubius)
- scarlet gaura (Gaura coccinea) - native
- showy milkweed (Asclepias speciosa) - native
- slim-flowered scurfpea (Psoralea tenuiflora) - native
- tansy mustard (Descurainia sp.)
- thistle (Cirsium cf. undulatum) - native
- tumble knapweed (Centaurea diffusa)
- velvety gaura (Gaura parviflora) - native
- white heath aster (Aster ericoides) - native
- white sweetclover (Melilotus alba)
- whitetop (Cardaria chalapense)
- whitetop (Cardaria draba)
- wintercress (Cardaria chalepensis)
- yellow sweetclover (Melilotus officinalis)
- wild licorice (Glycyrrhiza lepidota) - native

==== Trees and shrubs ====
A stand of trees with a Russian olive prominent in the right foreground.

- green ash (Fraxinus pensylvanica)
- black locust (Robinia sp.)
- peachleaf willow (Salix amygdaloides) - native
- plains cottonwood (Populus deltoides ssp. monolifera) - native
- rabbitbrush (Chrysothamnus nauseosus ssp. graveolens) - native
- Rocky Mountain juniper (Juniperus scopulorum)
- Russian olive (Eleagnus angustifolia)
- sandbar willow (Salix exigua) - native
- Siberian elm (Ulmus pumila)
- silver maple (Acer saccharinum)
- wild rose (Rosa sayi) - native

=== Fauna ===
==== Avian ====
In order of frequency of observations

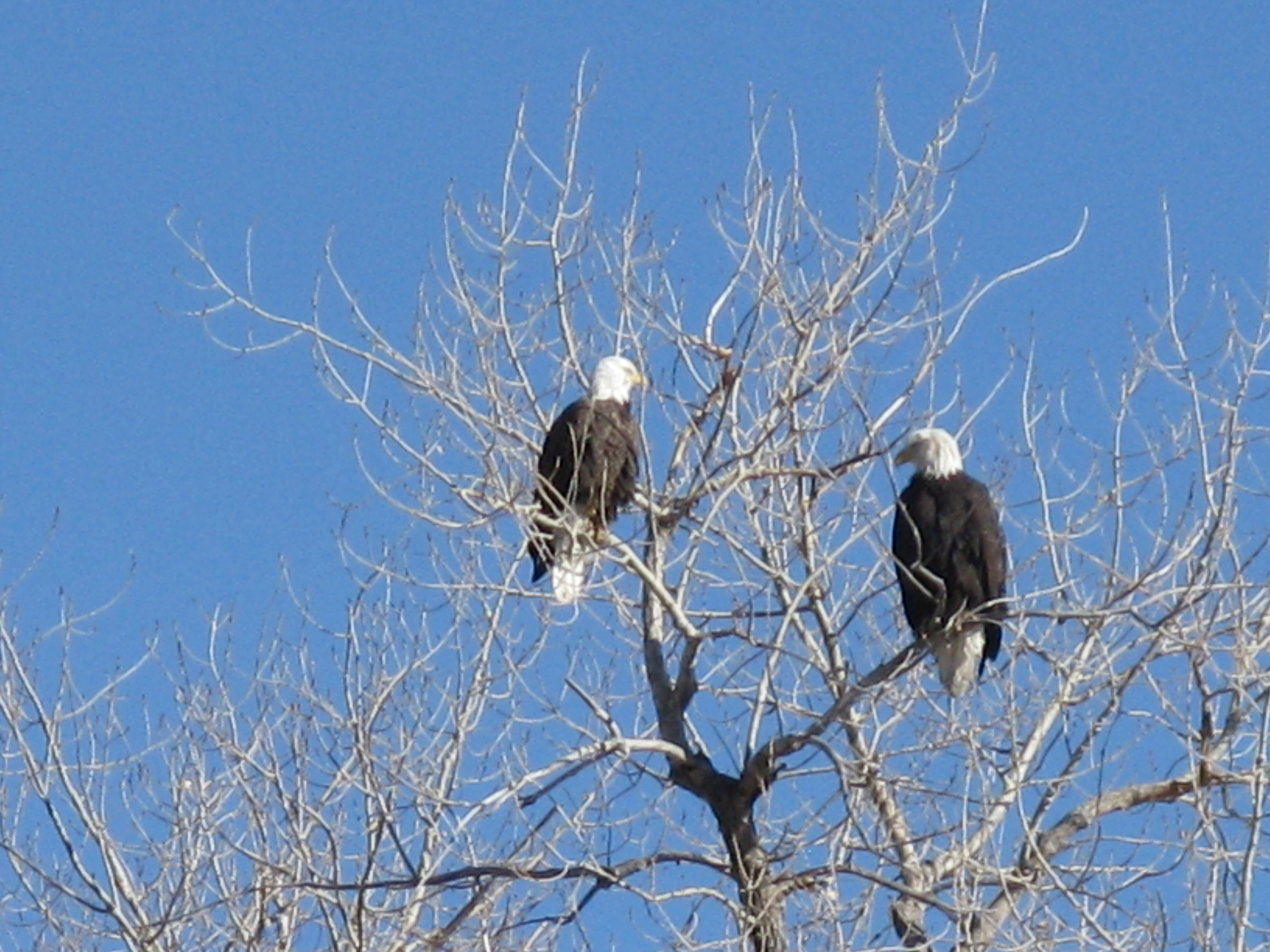
Bald eagles at Crown Hill Park, December 24, 2016.

- European starling
- Canada goose
- mallard
- red-winged blackbird
- mourning dove
- northern flicker (common)
- house finch
- killdeer
- black-billed magpie
- house sparrow
- American robin
- song sparrow
- Brewer's blackbird
- American tree sparrow
- black-capped chickadee
- common grackle
- green-winged teal
- northern shoveler
- American kestrel
- blue-winged teal
- wood duck
- gadwall
- Wilson's warbler
- western kingbird
- northern shrike
- violet-green swallow
- black tern
- cinnamon teal
- bullock's oriole
- spotted sandpiper
- western meadowlark
- yellow warbler
- great blue heron
- downy woodpecker
- red-tailed hawk
- sora
- Virginia rail
- warbling vireo
- American coot
- belted kingfisher
- blue jay
- hooded merganser
- merlin
- pied-billed grebe
- spotted towhee (rufous-sided)
- yellow-headed blackbird
- yellow-rumped warbler
- bald eagle

==== Fish ====
- catfish - stocked
- carp - stocked
- largemouth bass - stocked
- sunfish
- trout

==== Mammals ====
- beaver
- coyote
- rabbit
- squirrel

== History ==
When early settlers first came to Colorado they were often drawn by the lure of riches to be found in the towering mountains to the west. The California gold rush of 1849 brought tens of thousands of men, many of them previously farmers, to the west. Many prospected on their way through Colorado. Often their dreams of riches ended in dust, and the disappointed miners returned to the plains to resume their former way of life – farming.

A number of small farming communities grew up on the rolling highlands west of pioneer Denver and Auraria. The area offered rich soil that, with irrigation, yielded abundant crops of wheat and vegetables. As its name reveals, the town of Wheat Ridge was built on a highland area that was soon covered with wheat farms. To its north the Clear Creek valley was soon filled with orchards and became known as Fruitdale. Further north, beyond the valley, other farmers built Arvada.

Henry Lee was born in Iowa, Oct. 31, 1841, to English immigrants. He became one of the best known Denver and Colorado pioneers. Henry came to Denver in 1864 from Iowa, following his elder brother, William, who arrived in the Denver area in 1845. William Lee had acquired extensive farming property between Wheat Ridge and Golden, just south of Clear Creek. The road to William's farm later became known as Lee Street. For the first few years Henry Lee earned his living by peddling vegetables from William's farm to miners in the mining camps of Gilpin, Clear Creek and Park counties. William Lee served as a member of the First Colorado Constitutional Convention in 1859, representing Jefferson County. He also founded the first grange in Colorado and was a prominent member of the Colorado Pioneer Society. William Lee died on January 21, 1911, at the age of 74.

Jennie Paul Lee was born in Iowa City, Iowa, on March 8, 1850. She married Henry Lee in 1873, and moved to Colorado in 1875, where they settled on Henry's farm. The Lee's had three children, two sons, Murray and Robert Paul, and a daughter, Jessie.

Always a public-spirited citizen, Henry Lee took a great deal of interest in politics. He represented Jefferson County in the House of Representatives Third Assembly and served two terms in the State Senate for the Fifth and Sixth Assemblies.

While a member of the Third General Assembly and chairman of its committee on public lands, Henry Lee introduced a bill providing for the sale to the City of Denver, at a nominal price and without competition, of two sections of school land for park purposes. One of these sections comprises what is now Denver's City Park. Lee was generally acknowledged as the father of the Denver park system, and served as Park Commissioner under both Mayors Johnson and Speer.

Over time Henry Lee acquired considerable land in Jefferson County, and at one time owned a whole section of what is now known as Edgewater and a large portion of Wheat Ridge. Crown Hill Cemetery is part of his old farm. Lee sold 180 acres (0.73 km^{2}) of land to the Crown Hill Cemetery Association in 1908 for $47,000. In 1914 Henry Lee still owned 300 acres (1.2 km^{2}) of the finest land in Jefferson County.

Henry Lee's involvement in irrigation and water-related problems led to the construction of Denver's first pumping station and the founding of the Agriculture Ditch Company. Henry served as secretary from the time the company was organized until his death. To support their extensive farming business, Henry and William Lee built the Lee and Brothers Lateral Irrigation Ditch, which ran along Middle Golden Road, now known as 32nd Avenue. William Lee also ran the Lee Sand and Gravel Company along Youngfield from 38th Avenue to North Golden Road (now known as 44 Avenue).

Henry Lee was a partner in the Pioneer Seed Company of Denver, and also owned Henry Lee's Seed and Farm Implements, selling seeds and farm equipment, and designing and selling farm and market wagons, road carts, spring wagons, surreys, and carriages. He had originally brought farm implements and seeds from Iowa to start his prosperous business.

In 1908 Crown Hill Associates also purchased land from the Union Pacific Railroad, which was adjacent to the property purchased from William and Henry Lee. With this last purchase of land, the Crown Hill Associates' total holdings included 290 acres (1.2 km^{2}). Located on the property was the "Old Morgan House". Henry Lee had purchased the Morgan (also recorded as "Margan") Jones homestead in 1900. The portion containing the house, barns and other outbuildings, which are no longer standing, were contained in the land sold to Crown Hill in 1908.

On March 11, 1914, Henry Lee was the victim of one of Denver's first auto-pedestrian accidents. Henry Lee died on March 24 from his injuries, and was buried at Crown Hill Cemetery.

Jennie Lee continued to help run their farm until their son, Murray, died in 1939. Jennie Paul Lee died in November 1943 at the age of 93.

The two water bodies on the park property today were natural ponds. Waters stored in Crown Hill Lake originate in Clear Creek and are transported via the Crown Hill Agricultural Ditch to Crown Hill Lake. Most of the water in Kestrel Pond is seepage from Crown Hill Lake.

The farming communities of Wheat Ridge and Lakewood gradually grew. Local residents were becoming increasingly concerned about the loss of their country lands. When the citizens of Jefferson County created the Open Space Program in 1972, Crown Hill's neighbors began to urge the two cities to find a way to preserve one of the last large parcels of undeveloped land in what was then the most populous area of Jefferson County. In 1978 the Cities of Lakewood and Wheat Ridge joined the County in purchasing 168 acres (0.68 km^{2}) next to Crown Hill Cemetery and including Crown Hill Lake, creating Crown Hill Open Space Park.
