= Plastic, Colorado =

- Unincorporated community
- Interactive map of Plastic, Colorado
- Coordinates: 39°51′39″N 105°13′43″W
- Country: United States
- State: Colorado
- County: Jefferson County
- Elevation: 6,109 ft (1,862 m)
- Time zone: UTC-7 (Mountain (MST))
  - Summer (DST): UTC-6 (MDT)
- Postal code: 80403
- Area code: 720
- GNIS feature ID: 181650

Plastic is an unincorporated community in Jefferson County, Colorado, United States. It is 8 miles north of Golden and 11 miles south of Boulder. No known post office has operated in Plastic itself. It is served by the Moffat Tunnel Division of the Union Pacific Railroad. An unused Union Pacific branch extends across Plastic, and into what was formerly the Rocky Flats Plant. During this period, the area was alternatively known as Plastic Siding.
