= South Valley Park =

Park in Jefferson County, Colorado, United States

- Location within Colorado
- Location: Jefferson County, Colorado, United States
- Nearest city: Ken Caryl, Colorado
- Coordinates: 39°33′56″N 105°9′9″W
- Area: 909 acres (3.68 km^{2})
- Created: 1999
- Operator: Jefferson County Open Space

South Valley Park is Jefferson County Open Space located in Jefferson County west of Ken Caryl, Colorado. The 909-acre (3.68 km^{2}) Front Range park established in 1999 has 8 miles (13 km) of hiking trails. Horse and bicycle travel is allowed on 7 miles (11 km). Facilities include a parking lot, restrooms, picnic sites.

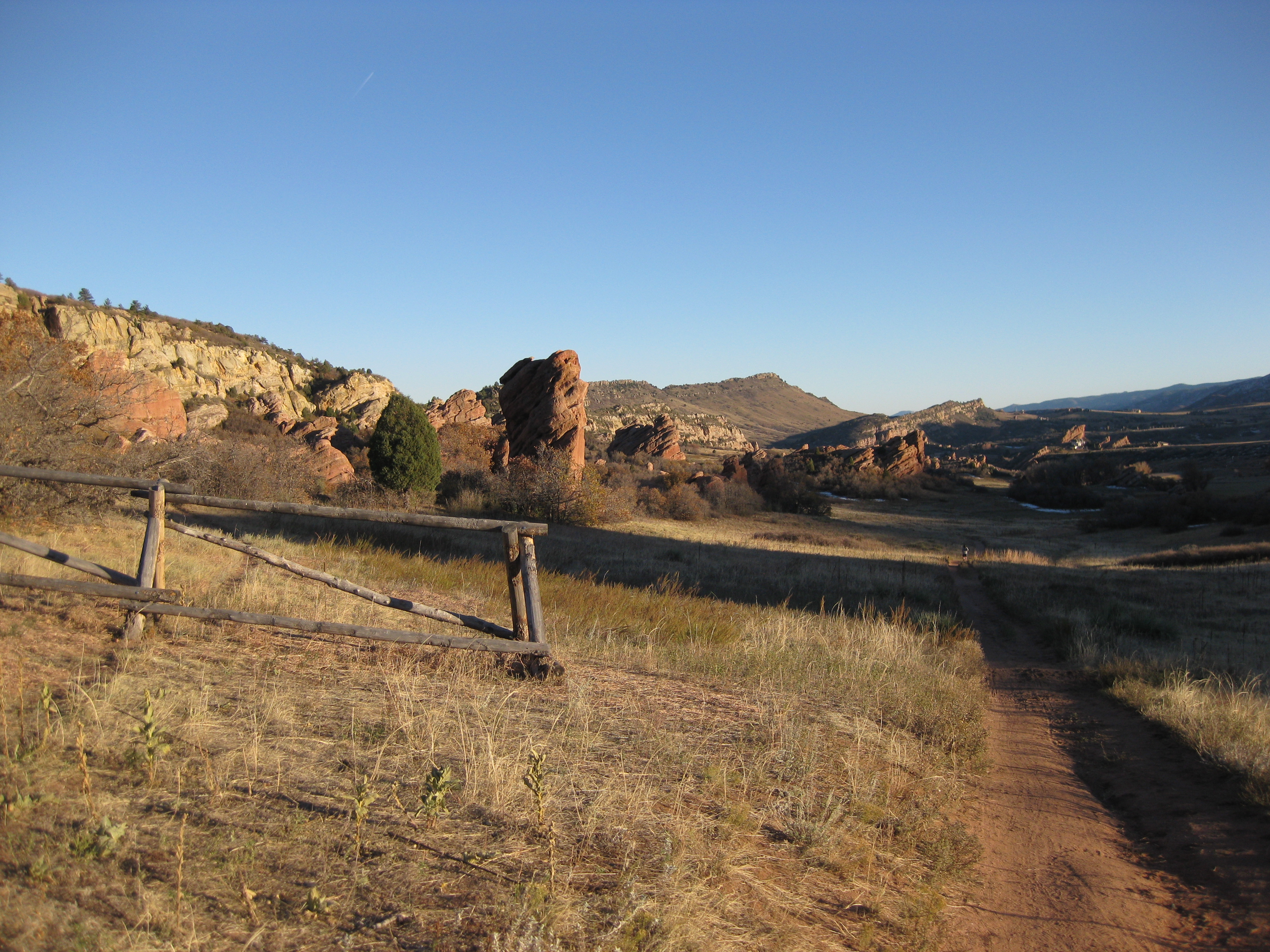
Coyote Song Trail

The Fountain and Lyons Formations pierce the meadows and scrubland of the park. Rocky mountain juniper and Gambel oak are found around the rock spires. Commonly seen wildlife includes mule deer, elk. Common birds include steller's jay.

The park has been occupied by humans as early as 10,000 years ago. The earliest evidence is a 10,000-year-old Folsom spear point found in the park. Numerous fire pits and stone tools have also been found in the area. A human skull found at a burial site has been carbon dated to approximately 1,900 years ago.

== Gallery ==
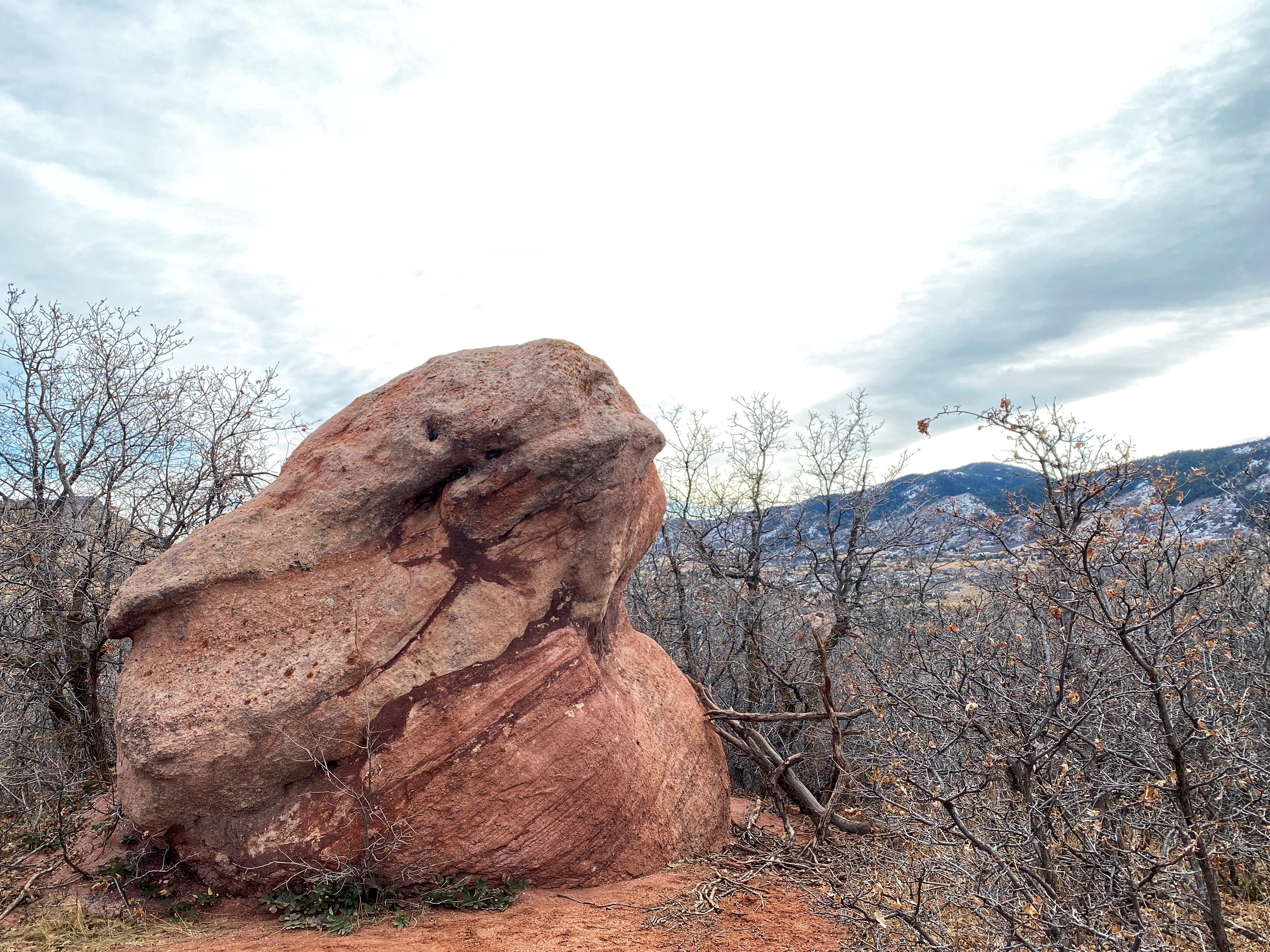
red rock formation

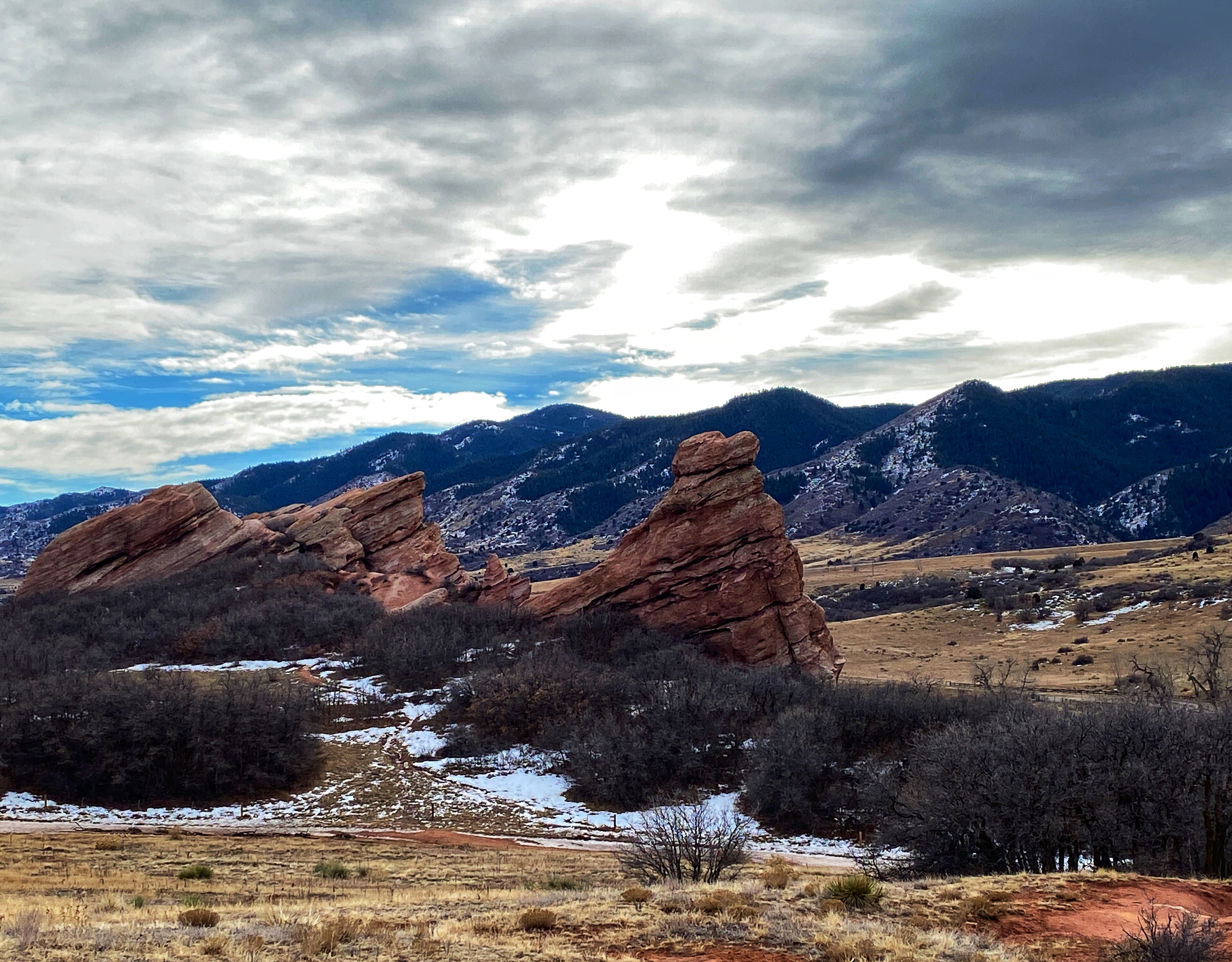
red rock formations

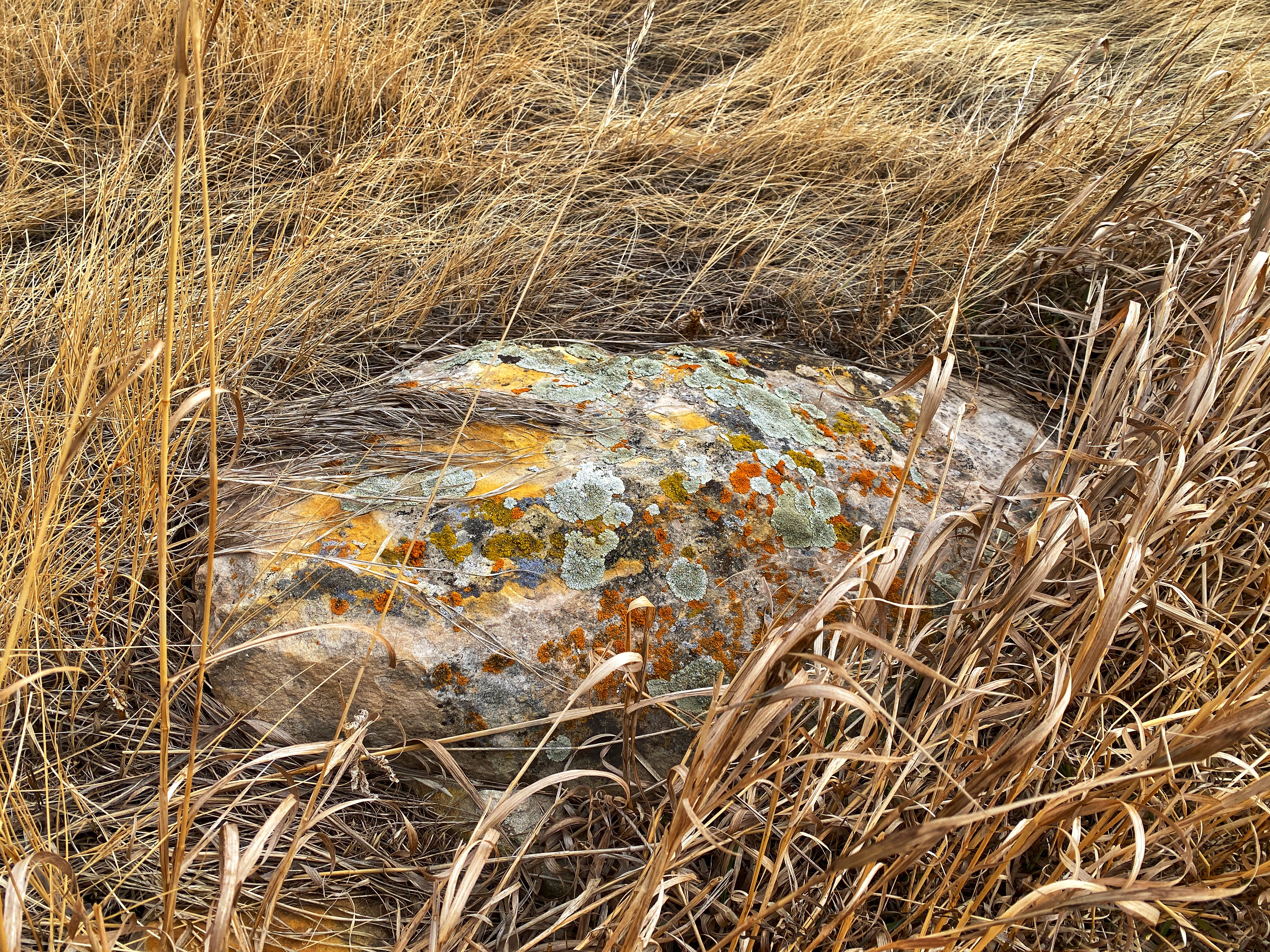
rock with lichen

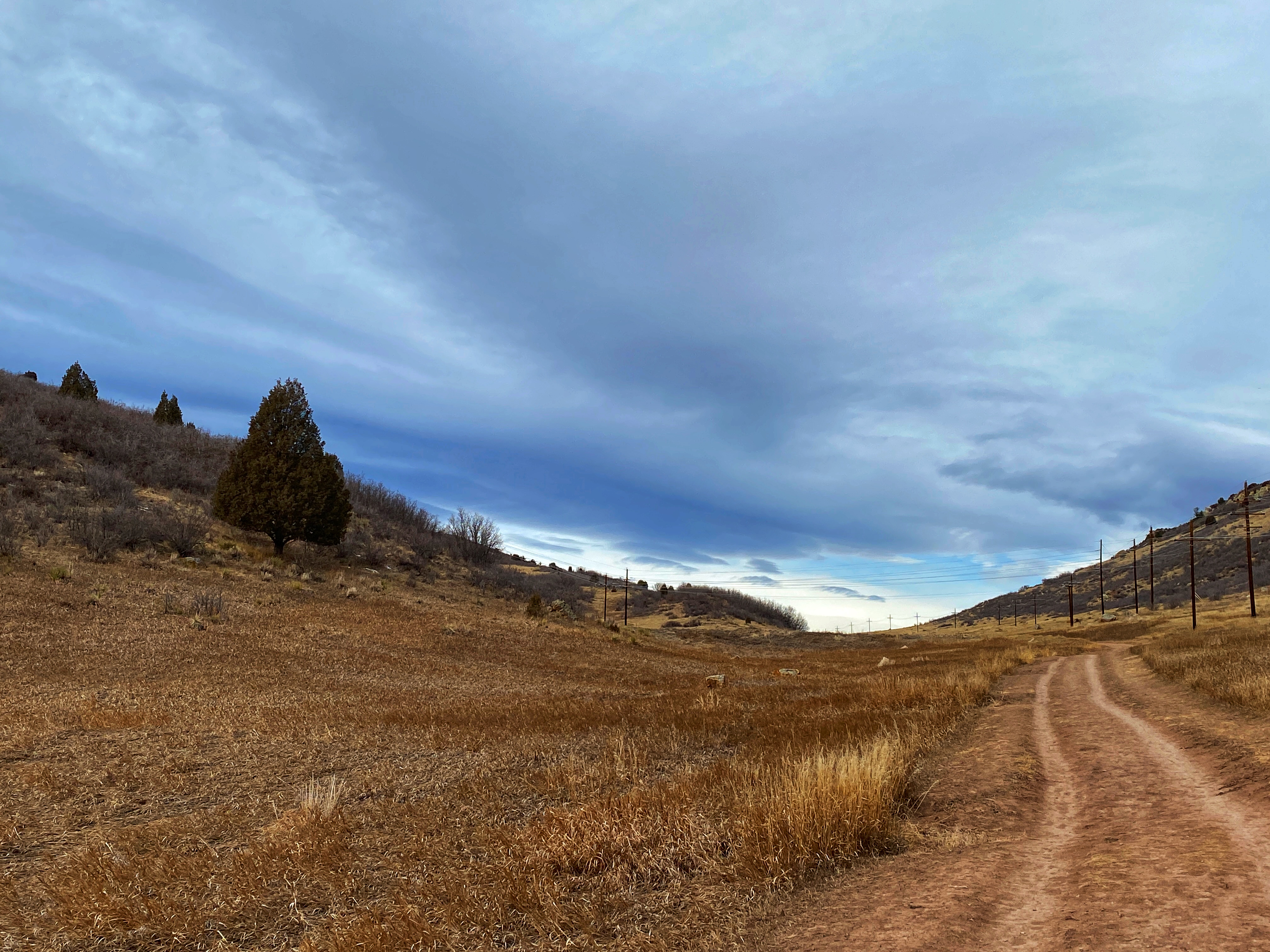
Columbine trail

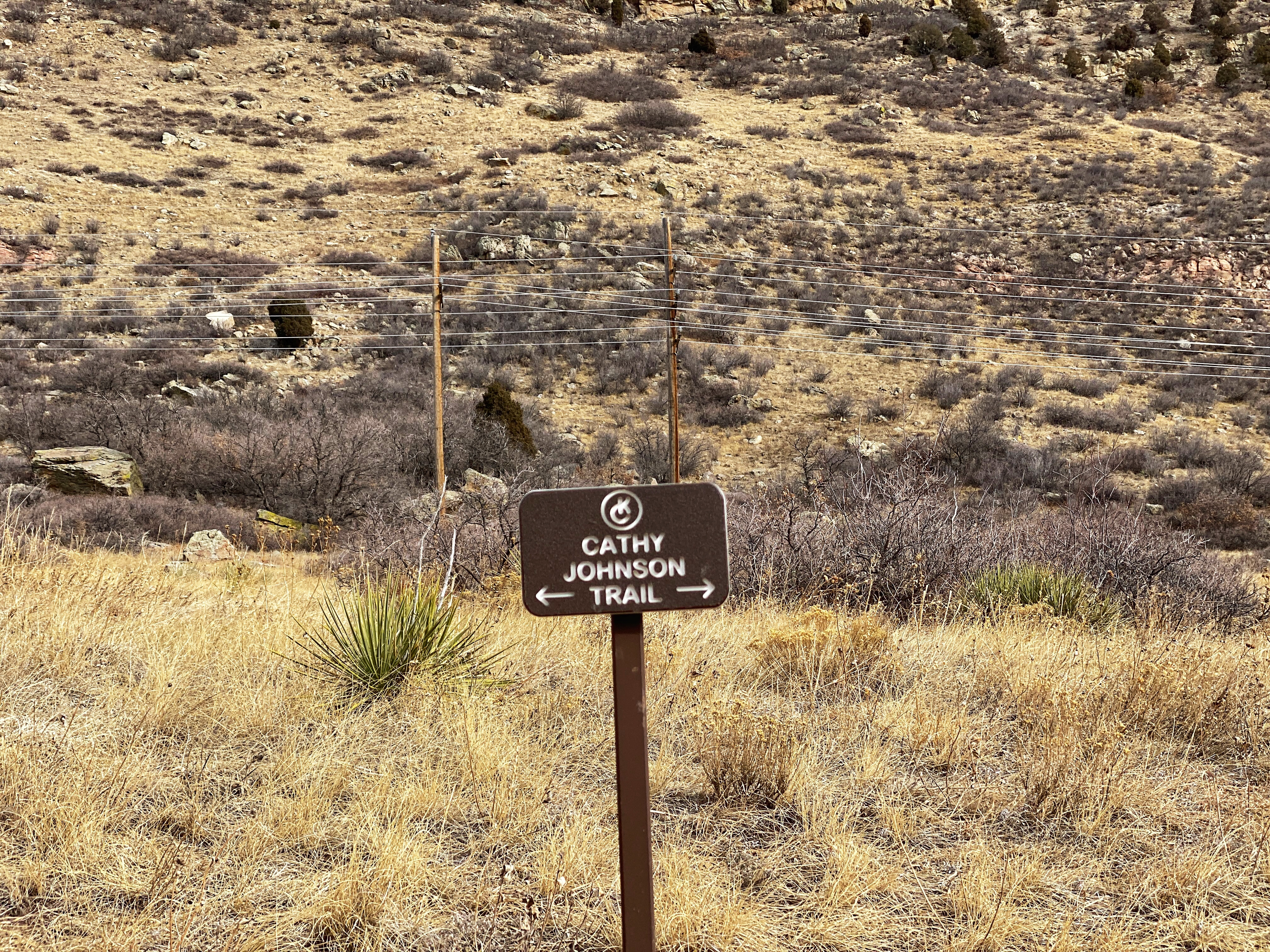
Cathy Johnson trail marker

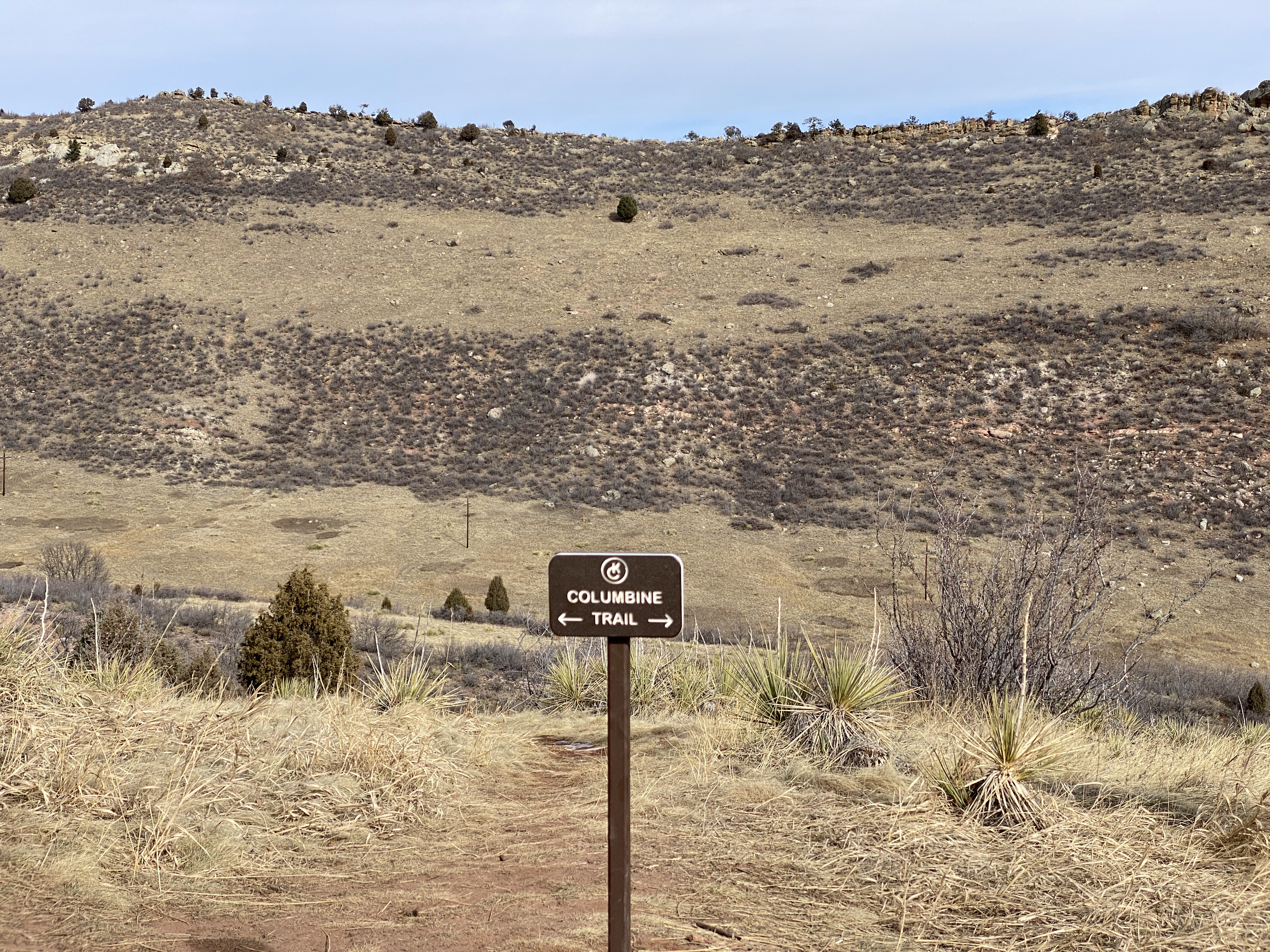
Columbine trail marker

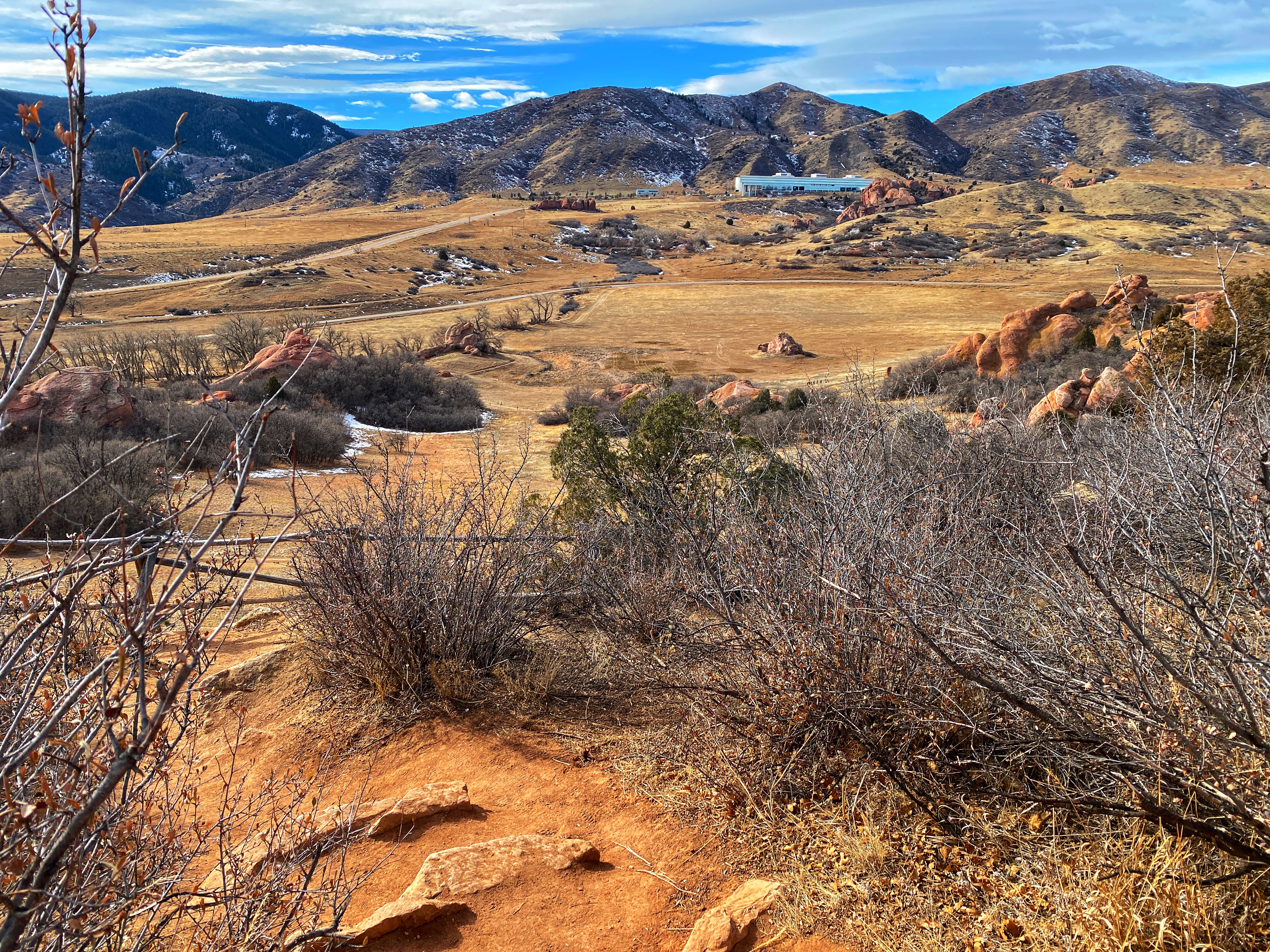
trail

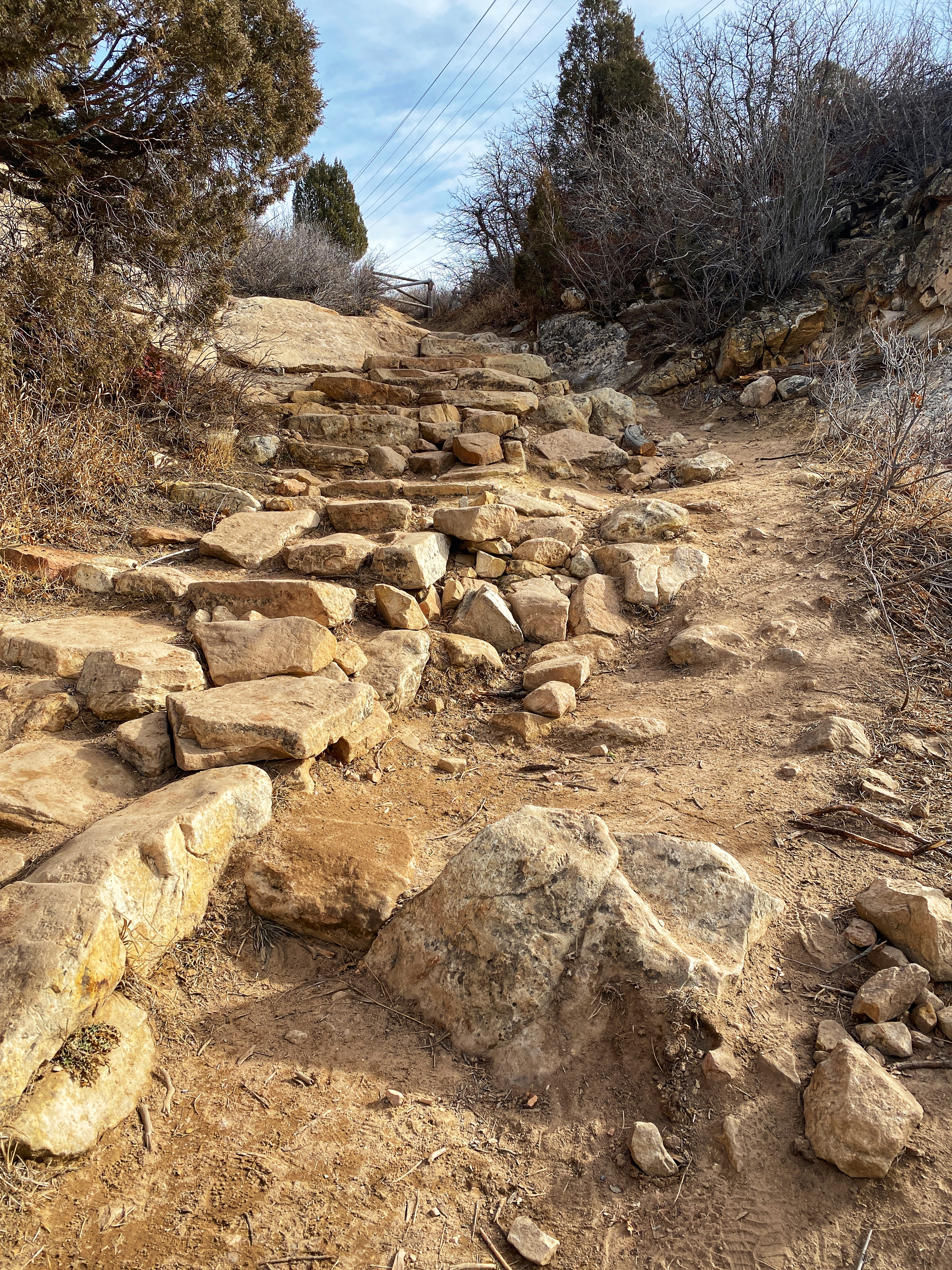
steps on trail

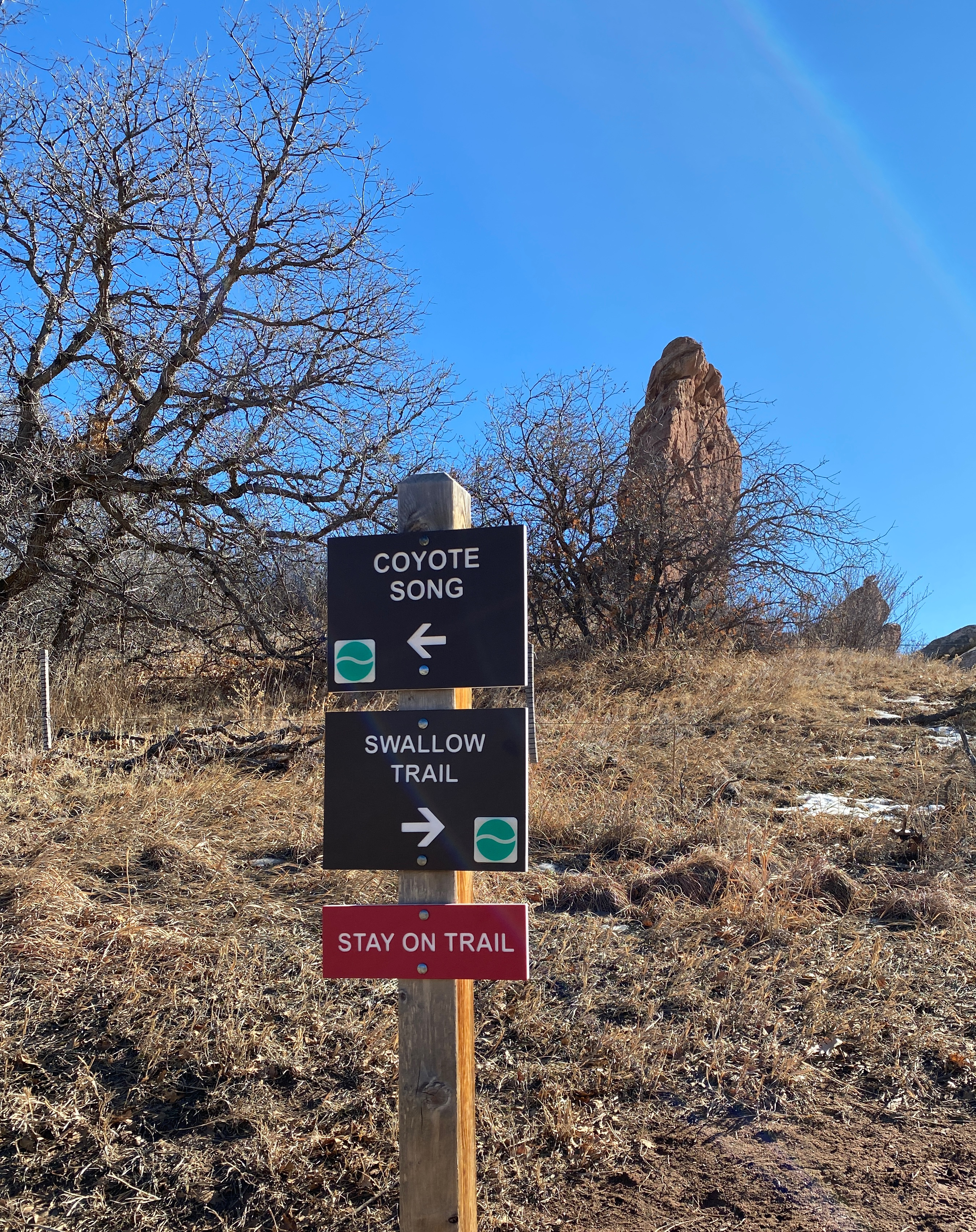
Coyote Song and Swallow Trail marker sign

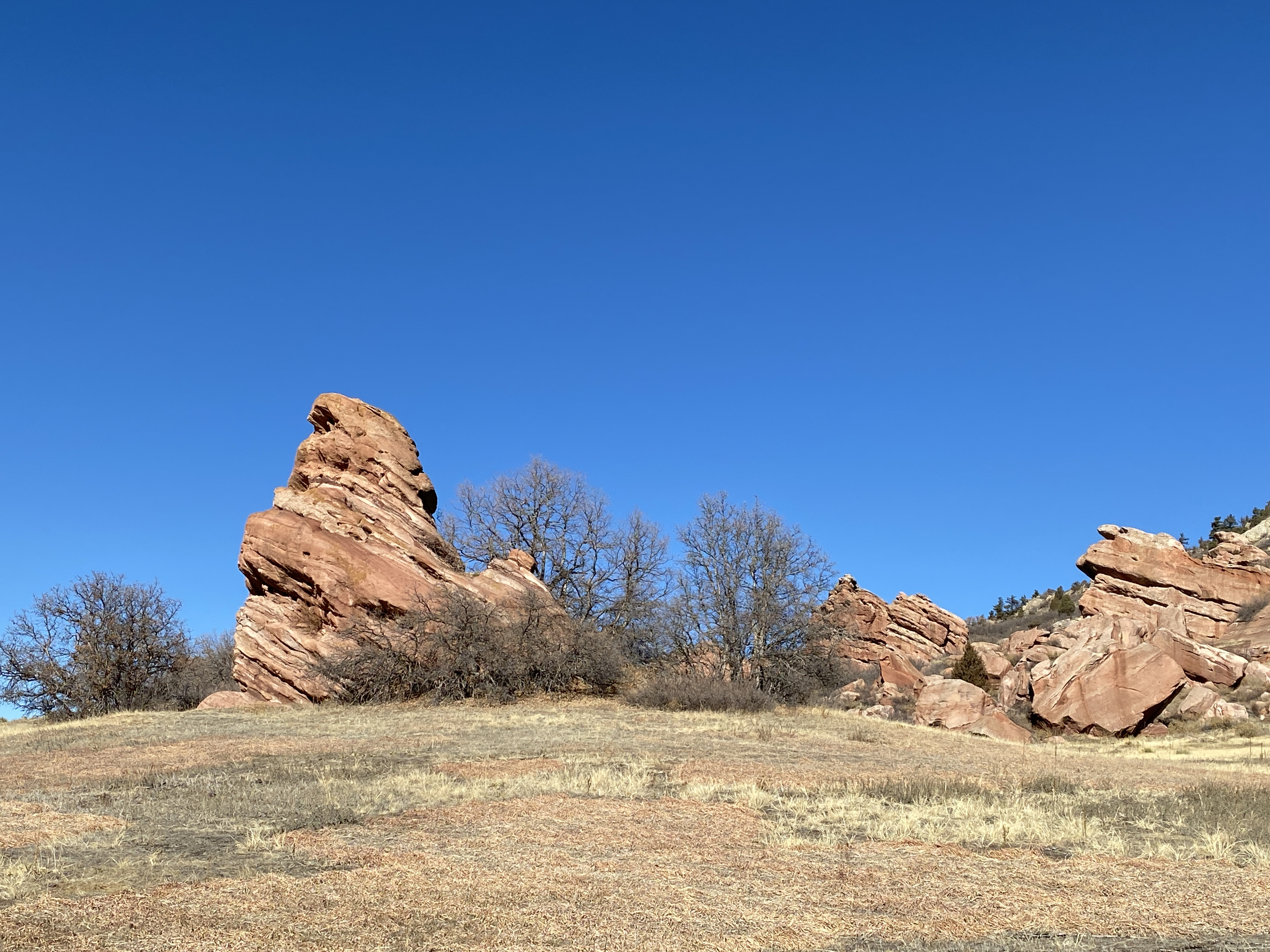
red rocks

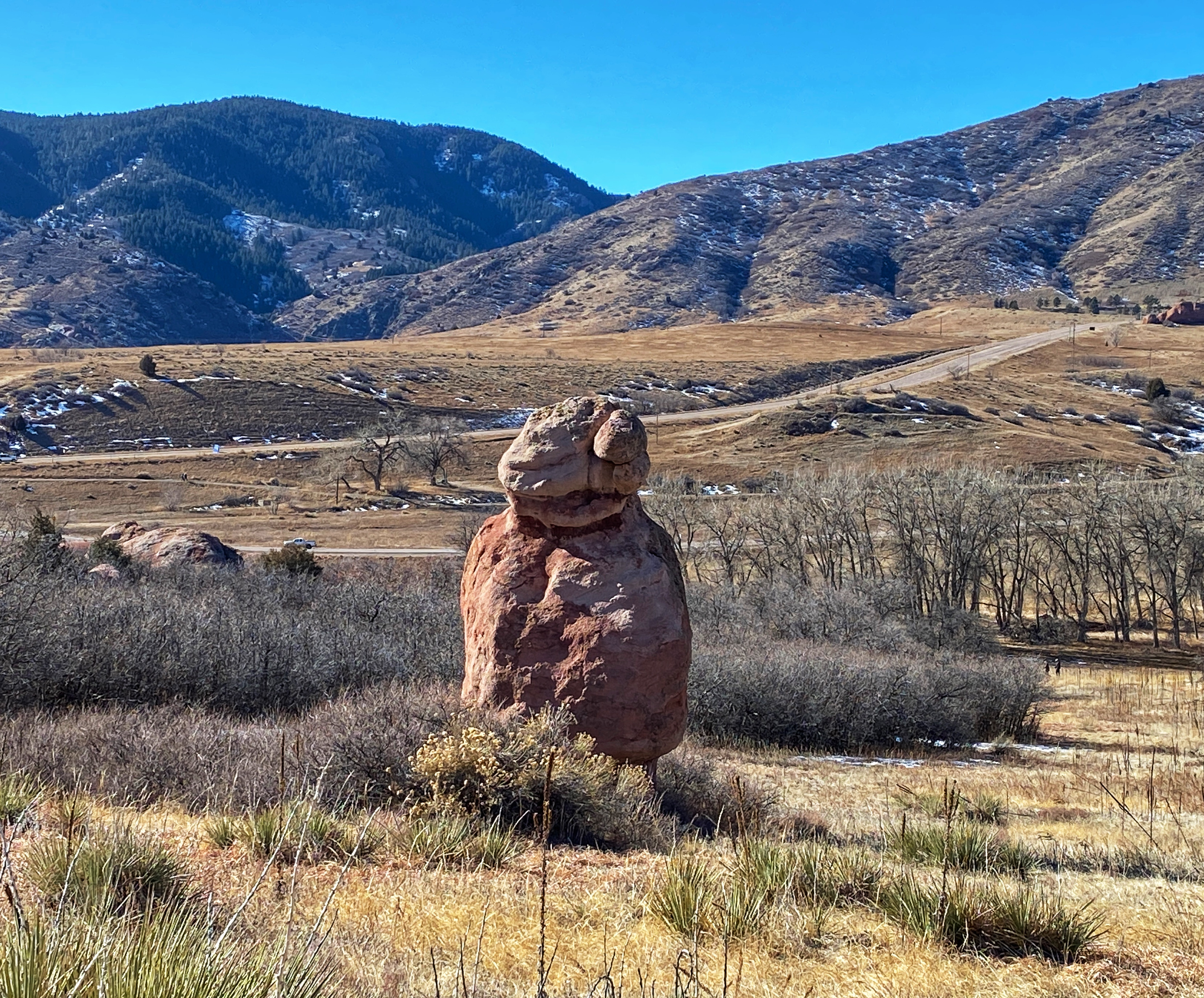
tall red rocks
