= Two Ponds National Wildlife Refuge =

Small urban wildlife refuge in Arvada, Colorado, USA

- IUCN category IV (habitat/species management area)
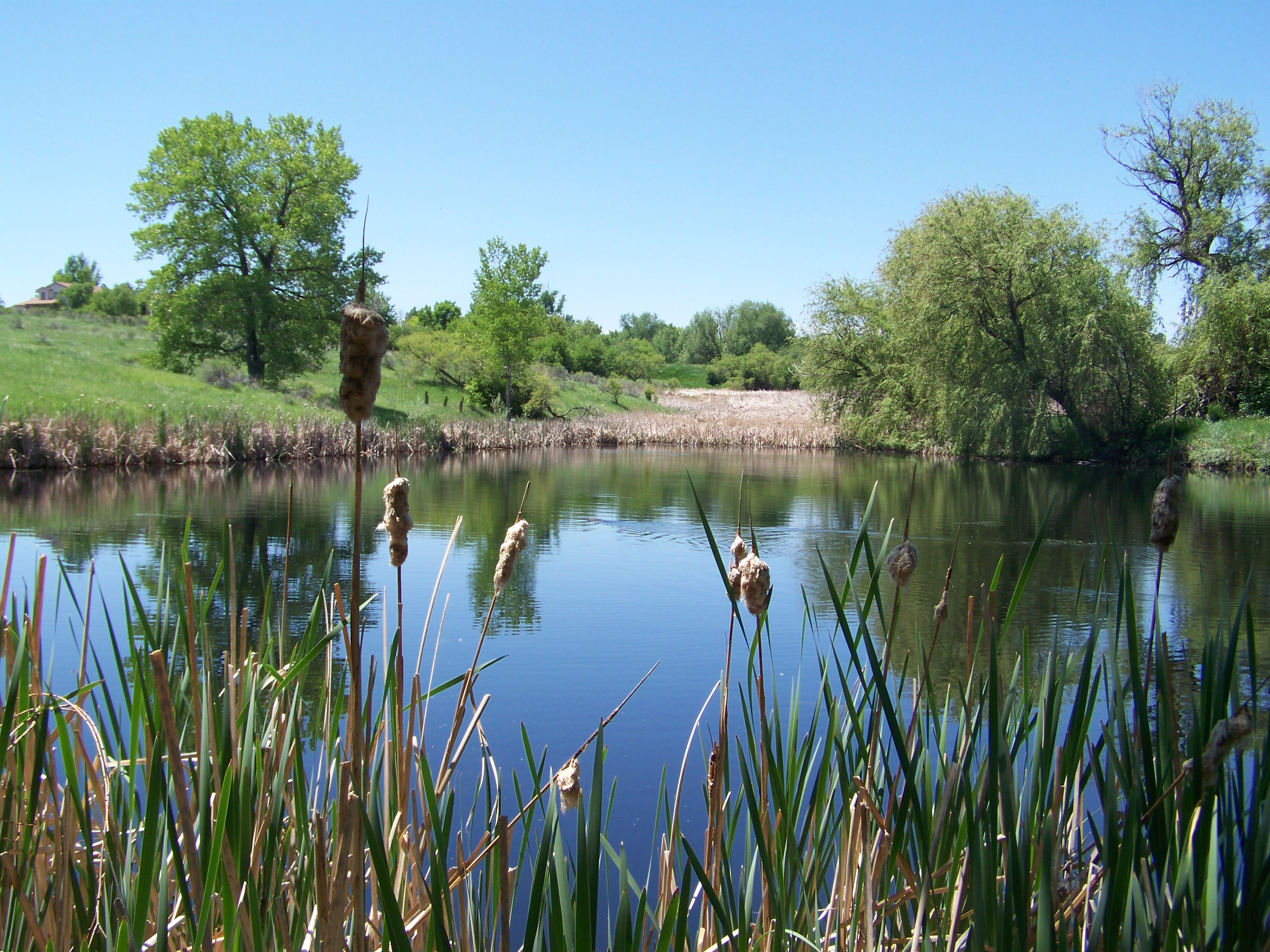

- Location within the United States
- Location: 9210 W 80th Avenue, Arvada, Colorado (located in Jefferson County, Colorado, United States)
- Coordinates: 39°50′24″N 105°6′15″W
- Area: 72.2 acres (29.2 ha)
- Established: 1992
- Governing body: U.S. Fish and Wildlife Service
- Website: Two Ponds National Wildlife Refuge

Two Ponds National Wildlife Refuge is the smallest urban unit of the National Wildlife Refuge System. The refuge is located in the City of Arvada, Jefferson County, Colorado, United States. The refuge consists of 72.2 acres (29.2 ha) of land, including 63.2 acres (25.6 ha) of uplands, 9.0 acres (3.6 ha) of wetlands, and three small ponds. The site sits in the midst of a region of suburban expansion of the Denver Metropolitan Area, and was saved from development in 1990 by a group of concerned people, now a Friend's group entitled the Two Ponds Preservation Foundation. The refuge was established in 1992 and continues to protect various animals as well as unique high prairie plants, and offers visitors many activities, including hiking, guided tours, and group educational opportunities.
