= Jefferson County, Colorado =

County in Colorado, United States

- County
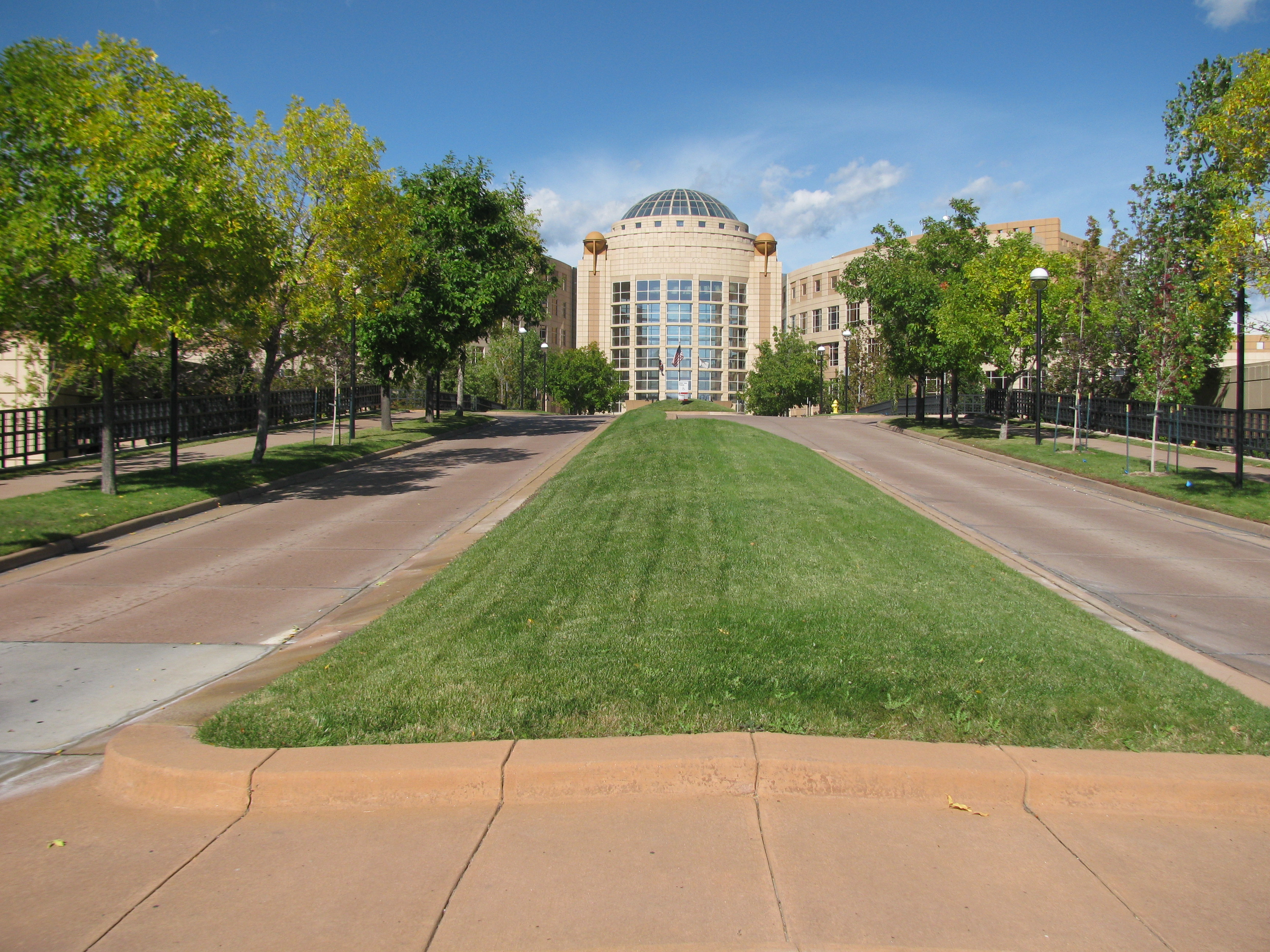
- Jefferson County Courthouse in Golden, nicknamed "Colorado's Taj Mahal" for its dome architecture

- Flag Seal
- Motto: Gateway to the Rocky Mountains
- Location within the U.S. state of Colorado
- Coordinates: 39.59°N 105.25°W
- Country: United States
- State: Colorado
- Founded: November 1, 1861
- Named for: Jefferson Territory
- Seat: Golden
- Largest city: Lakewood

Area
  - Total: 774 sq mi (2,000 km^{2})
  - Land: 764 sq mi (1,980 km^{2})
  - Water: 9.8 sq mi (25 km^{2}) 1.3%

Population (2020)
  - Total: 582,910
  - Estimate (2025): 580,451 ▼
  - Density: 763/sq mi (295/km^{2})
- Time zone: UTC−7 (Mountain)
  - Summer (DST): UTC−6 (MDT)
- Congressional districts: 1st, 2nd, 6th, 7th
- Website: www.jeffco.us

Jefferson County is a county located in the U.S. state of Colorado. As of the 2020 census, the population was 582,910, making it the fourth-most populous county in Colorado. The county seat is Golden, which was Colorado's capital twice, and its most populous city is Lakewood.

Jefferson County is included in the Denver-Aurora-Lakewood, CO Metropolitan Statistical Area. Located along the Front Range of the Rocky Mountains, Jefferson County is adjacent to the state capital of Denver.

In 2010, the center of population of Colorado was located in Jefferson County.

The county's slogan is the "Gateway to the Rocky Mountains", and it is commonly nicknamed Jeffco. The name Jeffco is incorporated in the name of the Jeffco School District, the Jeffco Business Center Metropolitan District No. 1, and several businesses located in Jefferson County. Jeffco is also incorporated in the unofficial monikers of many Jefferson County agencies. The Rocky Mountain Metropolitan Airport operated by Jefferson County was previously known as the Jeffco Airport.

A major employer in Jefferson County is the large Coors Brewing Company in Golden. Also, the state-supported Colorado School of Mines, a university specializing in mining, geology, chemistry, and engineering is located in Jefferson County.

== History ==
On August 25, 1855, the Kansas Territorial Legislature created Arapahoe County to govern the entire western portion of the territory. The county was named for the Arapaho Nation of Native Americans who lived in the region.

In June 1858, gold was discovered along the South Platte River in Arapahoe County (in present-day Englewood) by William Greeneberry Russell and Sam Bates who had been following up the June 22, 1850, discovery of gold on Ralston Creek in today's Jefferson County by Lewis Ralston, for whom the creek was named. This discovery precipitated the Pike's Peak Gold Rush. The Doniphan Party upon arriving upon Clear Creek discovered markers left over from earlier mining in 1834 by the Estes Party, placed their own alongside and on November 29, 1858, founded the future county's first town of Arapahoe City upon the land southeast of today's West 44th Avenue and McIntyre Street (with West 44th running through the town). On June 16, 1859, its second town, Golden, Colorado, was founded in the valley to the west. Many residents of the mining region felt disconnected from the remote territorial governments of Kansas and Nebraska, so they voted to form their own Territory of Jefferson on October 24, 1859. The following month on November 28, 1859, the Jefferson Territorial Legislature organized 12 counties for the new territory, including Jefferson County. Jefferson County was named for the namesake of the Jefferson Territory, Thomas Jefferson, the principal author of the Declaration of Independence and the nation's third president. Golden City was elected on January 2, 1860, as the county seat of Jefferson County. Robert Williamson Steele, Governor of the Provisional Government of the Territory of Jefferson from 1859 to 1861, built his home in the county at Mount Vernon and later at Apex. Originally Jefferson County's borders extended to the 40th parallel north, the South Platte River (excluding the town of Highland) to the east, and to Bear Creek to the south.

The Jefferson Territory never received federal sanction, but during his last week in office, President James Buchanan signed an act which organized the Territory of Colorado on February 28, 1861. That November 1, the new Colorado General Assembly organized the 17 original counties of Colorado, including Jefferson County. The reorganized Jefferson County extended to most of its current borders and Golden continued as county seat. In 1908, the southern tip of Jefferson County was transferred to Park County, reducing Jefferson County to its present length of 54 miles (87 km). Several annexations by the City & County of Denver and the 2001 consolidation of the City & County of Broomfield removed the east and extreme northeastern corner of the county, respectively.

== Geography ==
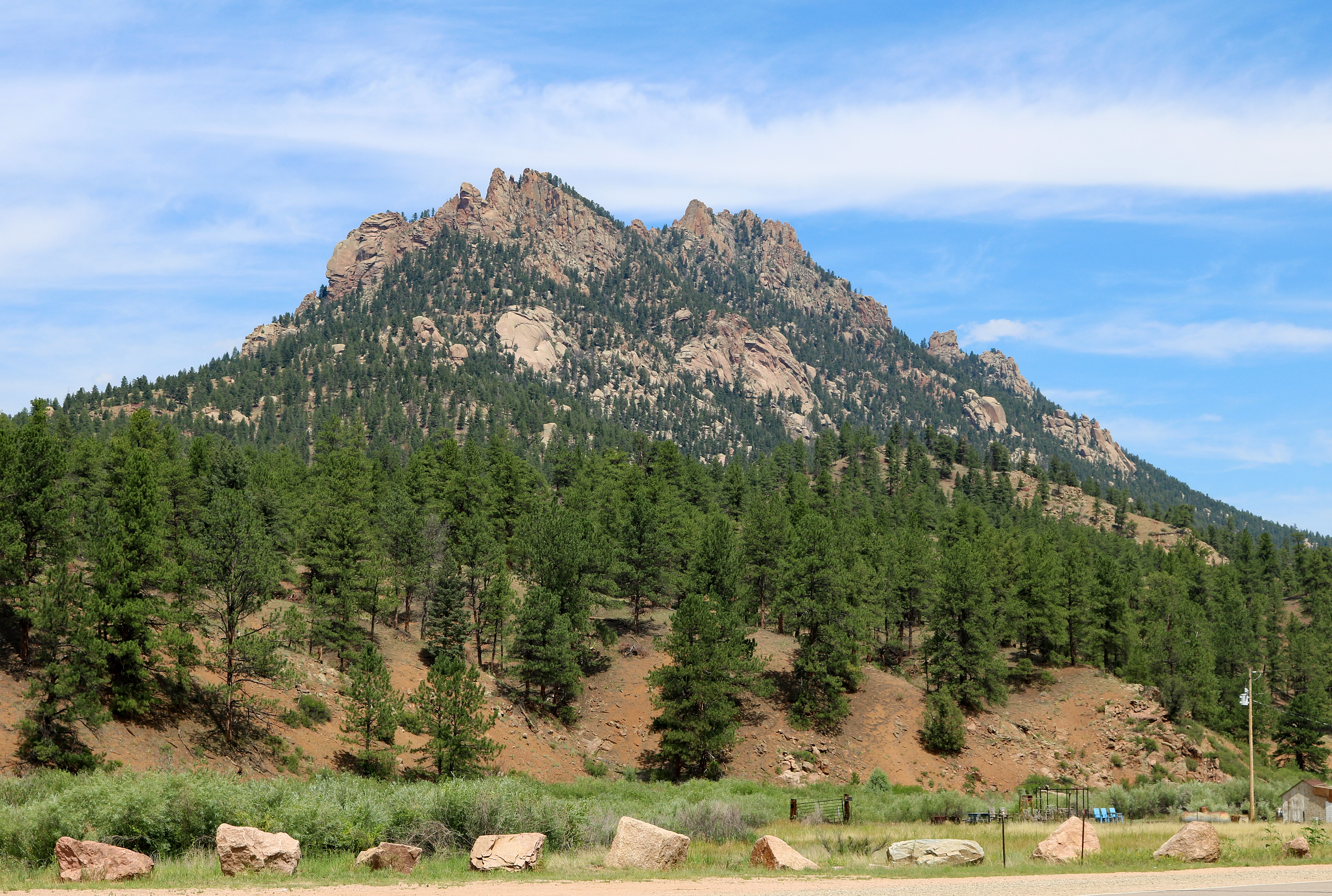
Long Scraggy Peak in the southeastern part of the county.

At the 2020 United States census, the county had a total area of 774 square miles (2,000 km^{2}), of which 764 square miles (1,980 km^{2}) is land and 9.8 square miles (25 km^{2}) (1.3%) is water. As of April 1, 2020, the mean population center of the State of Colorado was located in Jefferson County at coordinates 39.5347°N 105.1854°W near the tiny hamlet of Phillipsburg.

=== Adjacent counties ===
Jefferson County is one of the few counties in the United States to border as many as ten counties.

- Boulder County – north
- City and County of Broomfield – northeast
- Adams County – east
- City and County of Denver – east
- Arapahoe County – east
- Douglas County – east
- Teller County – south
- Park County – southwest
- Clear Creek County – west
- Gilpin County – northwest

=== Major highways ===
- Interstate 70
- I-70 BS
- U.S. Highway 6
- U.S. Highway 40
- U.S. Highway 285
- State Highway 8
- State Highway 58
- State Highway 72
- State Highway 74
- State Highway 75
- State Highway 93
- State Highway 121
- State Highway 391
- State Highway 470
- Chatfield Ave
- 44th Ave
- CR 65
- CR 66 (Mount Blue Sky Scenic Byway)
- CR 67
- CR 73
- CR 93 (Hogback Road)
- CR 126 (Pine Valley Road/Deckers Road)

=== Recreational areas ===
- Alderfer/Three Sisters Park
- Apex Park
- Bear Creek Lake Park
- Centennial Cone Park
- Clear Creek Canyon Park
- Coal Creek Canyon
- Crown Hill Park
- Deer Creek Canyon Park
- Elk Meadow Park
- Evergreen Lake
- Fairmount Trail
- Flying J Ranch Park
- Hildebrand Ranch Park
- Hiwan Homestead Museum
- Lair o' the Bear Park
- Lewis Meadows Park
- Lookout Mountain Nature Center
- Matthews/Winters Park
- Meyer Ranch Park
- Mount Falcon Park
- Mount Galbraith Park
- Mount Glennon
- Mount Lindo
- North Table Mountain Park
- Pine Valley Ranch Park
- Ranson/Edwards Homestead Ranch
- Reynolds Park
- Sister City Park
- South Table Mountain Park
- South Valley Park
- Standley Lake Regional Park
- Van Bibber Park
- Welchester Tree Grant Park
- White Ranch Park
- Windy Saddle Park
- Urban Trails

== Demographics ==
Historical population
Census	Pop.	Note	%±
1870	2,390		—
1880	6,804		184.7%
1890	8,450		24.2%
1900	9,306		10.1%
1910	14,231		52.9%
1920	14,400		1.2%
1930	21,810		51.5%
1940	30,725		40.9%
1950	55,687		81.2%
1960	127,520		129.0%
1970	233,031		82.7%
1980	371,753		59.5%
1990	438,430		17.9%
2000	527,056		20.2%
2010	534,543		1.4%
2020	582,910		9.0%
2025 (est.)	580,451	▼	−0.4%
U.S. Decennial Census 1790-1960 1900-1990 1990-2000 2010-2020

=== 2020 census ===
As of the 2020 census, the county had a population of 582,910. Of the residents, 19.5% were under the age of 18 and 17.4% were 65 years of age or older; the median age was 40.3 years. For every 100 females there were 99.5 males, and for every 100 females age 18 and over there were 98.2 males. 92.9% of residents lived in urban areas and 7.1% lived in rural areas.

Jefferson County, Colorado – Racial and ethnic composition Note: the US Census treats Hispanic/Latino as an ethnic category. This table excludes Latinos from the racial categories and assigns them to a separate category. Hispanics/Latinos may be of any race.
Race / Ethnicity (NH = Non-Hispanic)	Pop 2000	Pop 2010	Pop 2020	% 2000	% 2010	% 2020
White alone (NH)	447,416	427,160	435,245	84.89%	79.91%	74.67%
Black or African American alone (NH)	4,312	5,001	6,653	0.82%	0.94%	1.14%
Native American or Alaska Native alone (NH)	2,748	2,638	2,898	0.52%	0.49%	0.50%
Asian alone (NH)	11,855	13,682	17,694	2.25%	2.56%	3.04%
Pacific Islander alone (NH)	335	390	464	0.06%	0.07%	0.08%
Other race alone (NH)	534	715	2,816	0.10%	0.13%	0.48%
Mixed race or Multiracial (NH)	7,407	8,512	25,626	1.41%	1.59%	4.40%
Hispanic or Latino (any race)	52,449	76,445	91,514	9.95%	14.30%	15.70%
Total	527,056	534,543	582,910	100.00%	100.00%	100.00%

The racial makeup of the county was 79.0% White, 1.3% Black or African American, 1.0% American Indian and Alaska Native, 3.1% Asian, 0.1% Native Hawaiian and Pacific Islander, 4.6% from some other race, and 10.8% from two or more races. Hispanic or Latino residents of any race comprised 15.7% of the population.

There were 237,676 households in the county, of which 26.9% had children under the age of 18 living with them and 24.2% had a female householder with no spouse or partner present. About 26.7% of all households were made up of individuals and 10.7% had someone living alone who was 65 years of age or older.

There were 248,429 housing units, of which 4.3% were vacant. Among occupied housing units, 69.3% were owner-occupied and 30.7% were renter-occupied. The homeowner vacancy rate was 0.7% and the rental vacancy rate was 5.9%.

=== 2000 census ===
As of the 2000 census, there were 527,056 people, 206,067 households, and 140,537 families residing in the county. The population density was 683 people per square mile (264 people/km^{2}). There were 212,488 housing units at an average density of 275 people per square mile (106 people/km^{2}). The racial makeup of the county was

90.59%	White
0.89%	Black or African American
0.75%	Native American
2.28%	Asian
0.08%	Pacific Islander
3.23%	from other races
9.95% of the population were either Hispanic or Latino of any race
2.18% in two or more races

There were 206,067 households, out of which 33.40% had children under age 18 living with them, 55.10% were married couples living together, 9.10% had a female householder with no husband present, and 31.80% were non-families. 24.50% of all households were made up of individuals, of those 6.30% were someone living alone who was 65 years of age or older. The average household size was 2.52, and the average family size was 3.03 persons.

In the county, the population ages were spread out:

25.30%	under age 18
8.10%	aged 18–24
32.10%	aged 25–44
24.90%	aged 45–64
9.60%	65 years of age or older
The median age was 37 years.

For every 100 females there were 99.00 males. For every 100 females age 18 and over, there were 96.80 males.

The median income for a household in the county was $57,339, and the median income for a family was $67,310. Males had a median income of $45,306 versus $32,372 for females. The per capita income for the county was $28,066. About 3.40% of families and 5.20% of the population were below the poverty line, including 5.80% of those under age 18, and 5.10% of those age 65 or over.

According to a report in the JAMA, residents of Jefferson County had a 2014 life expectancy of 80.02 years.

== Education ==
The sole school district serving the county is Jefferson County School District R-1.

Private schools

- Colorado Academy

Higher Education

- Colorado Christian University
- Colorado School of Mines
- Red Rocks Community College
- Rocky Mountain College of Art and Design

Jefferson County Public Library is the county library system.

== Government and infrastructure ==
- The Federal Correctional Institution, Englewood is in unincorporated Jefferson County.
- The Rocky Flats Plant produced nuclear weapons in Jefferson County from 1952 until 1989.
- The Jefferson County Public Library, established in 1952.
- The Jefferson County Government Center, also known as the "courts and admin building".
- The Denver Federal Center, the largest concentration of federal government agencies outside of Washington, D.C., is located in Lakewood.

=== Government ===
The Board of County Commissioners operates as the governing body of the county. Established in 1861, the board consists of three commissioners who are elected at-large to four-year terms. The board sets policies that guide county programs and operations which serves residents and businesses. There are several elected officials that oversee a department or aspect of county operations.

Board of County Commissioners
District	Commissioner	Party
District 1	Rachel Zenzinger	Democratic
District 2	Andy Kerr	Democratic
District 3	Lesley Dahlkemper	Democratic

Elected County Officials
Title	Official	Party
Assessor	Scot Kersgaard	Democratic
Clerk and Recorder	Amanda Gonzalez	Democratic
Coroner	Dr. Annette Cannon	Democratic
Sheriff	Regina "Reggie" Marinelli	Democratic
Surveyor	Robert Hennessy	Republican
Treasurer	Gerald "Jerry" DiTullio	Democratic

Jefferson County lies within the 1st Judicial District which is represented by District Attorney Alexis King.

=== Sheriff's office ===
The Jefferson County Sheriff is an oldest elective office in Jefferson County (along with Clerk and Recorder, Assessor and Treasurer) and among the first popularly elected offices in Colorado, established in 1859 with the first Sheriff, Walter Pollard, elected on January 2, 1860. Its office holders over the course of over 150 years have included some of the most noted law enforcement officers in Colorado history.

The Jefferson County Sheriff's Office responded to the 1999 Columbine High School massacre, and investigated it together with the F.B.I. The Sheriff's Office (under then sheriff John P. Stone) received backlash after it was revealed the agency had the perpetrators Eric Harris and Dylan Klebold in and out of custody prior to the shooting. After the shooting, Sue Klebold sued the Sheriff's office for failing to prevent her son from carrying out the Columbine High shootings. According to a "notice of intent to sue" filed by Susan and Thomas Klebold, county officials were "reckless, willful and wanton" in the way they handled a 1998 police report about Eric Harris' Internet ravings. This lawsuit was dismissed along with several others pertaining to the shooting.

The current county sheriff is Regina "Reggie" Marinelli. She was elected in 2022 and became the first woman to do so in county history and became the first Democrat to hold the office in nearly a century. She previously worked in the county Sheriff's Office for over 30 years.

=== Politics ===
In federal elections, Jefferson County was a Republican stronghold for most of the 20th century, voting Republican in all but one presidential election between 1940 and 2004. However, it has voted Democratic in every presidential election since 2008, consistent with the general trend in the Denver metropolitan area. In 2024, Kamala Harris won the largest percentage for a Democratic presidential candidate since 1916.

In local politics, the county historically leaned Republican. The county commission and most countywide positions were often held by Republicans. Since the late 2010s, Democrats have controlled the county commission and represented most countywide offices.

United States presidential election results for Jefferson County, Colorado
Year	Republican		Democratic		Third party(ies)	
Year	No.	%	No.	%	No.	%
1880	832	49.55%	790	47.05%	57	3.39%
1884	845	50.97%	743	44.81%	70	4.22%
1888	970	52.92%	767	41.84%	96	5.24%
1892	792	42.86%	0	0.00%	1,056	57.14%
1896	300	8.41%	3,176	88.99%	93	2.61%
1900	1,807	44.79%	2,138	53.00%	89	2.21%
1904	2,903	60.76%	1,739	36.40%	136	2.85%
1908	2,623	48.58%	2,583	47.84%	193	3.57%
1912	1,011	18.87%	2,309	43.10%	2,037	38.03%
1916	2,040	36.60%	3,368	60.42%	166	2.98%
1920	3,593	61.52%	1,941	33.24%	306	5.24%
1924	4,869	63.69%	1,271	16.63%	1,505	19.69%
1928	6,754	69.09%	2,880	29.46%	141	1.44%
1932	5,522	45.83%	6,023	49.99%	503	4.17%
1936	5,271	41.10%	7,283	56.79%	271	2.11%
1940	8,780	52.81%	7,745	46.59%	100	0.60%
1944	9,815	57.20%	7,277	42.41%	68	0.40%
1948	9,903	51.29%	9,145	47.36%	260	1.35%
1952	19,971	63.05%	11,509	36.34%	194	0.61%
1956	25,398	63.71%	14,270	35.80%	197	0.49%
1960	34,105	59.62%	22,962	40.14%	137	0.24%
1964	33,398	43.48%	43,162	56.19%	252	0.33%
1968	50,847	56.90%	31,392	35.13%	7,118	7.97%
1972	80,082	69.88%	31,555	27.54%	2,960	2.58%
1976	87,080	60.44%	52,782	36.64%	4,211	2.92%
1980	97,008	59.66%	41,525	25.54%	24,078	14.81%
1984	124,496	68.92%	53,700	29.73%	2,432	1.35%
1988	110,820	56.39%	81,824	41.64%	3,867	1.97%
1992	82,705	37.05%	80,834	36.22%	59,664	26.73%
1996	101,517	48.41%	89,494	42.67%	18,712	8.92%
2000	120,138	51.02%	100,970	42.88%	14,383	6.11%
2004	140,644	51.79%	126,558	46.60%	4,366	1.61%
2008	131,628	44.61%	158,158	53.60%	5,282	1.79%
2012	144,197	46.36%	159,296	51.21%	7,559	2.43%
2016	138,177	42.01%	160,776	48.89%	29,930	9.10%
2020	148,417	39.33%	218,396	57.88%	10,545	2.79%
2024	140,505	38.84%	210,875	58.30%	10,336	2.86%

United States Senate election results for Jefferson County, Colorado2
Year	Republican		Democratic		Third party(ies)	
Year	No.	%	No.	%	No.	%
2020	158,276	41.99%	210,619	55.87%	8,069	2.14%

United States Senate election results for Jefferson County, Colorado3
Year	Republican		Democratic		Third party(ies)	
Year	No.	%	No.	%	No.	%
2022	115,978	38.61%	176,378	58.72%	8,000	2.66%

Colorado Gubernatorial election results for Jefferson County
Year	Republican		Democratic		Third party(ies)	
Year	No.	%	No.	%	No.	%
2022	108,638	36.19%	185,398	61.77%	6,129	2.04%

== Recreation ==
=== State parks ===
- Chatfield State Park
- Golden Gate Canyon State Park
- Staunton State Park

=== National forests and wilderness ===
- Pike National Forest
- Roosevelt National Forest
- Lost Creek Wilderness

=== National wildlife refuges ===
- Rocky Flats National Wildlife Refuge
- Two Ponds National Wildlife Refuge

=== Historic trail ===
- South Platte Trail

=== Recreational trails ===
- American Discovery Trail
- Apex National Recreation Trail
- Big Dry Creek National Recreation Trail
- Colorado Trail
- Platte River Greenway National Recreation Trail
- Two Ponds National Recreation Trail

=== Scenic byway ===
- Lariat Loop Scenic and Historic Byway

=== Golf course ===
- Hiwan Golf Club
- Indian Tree Golf Club

== Communities ==
=== Cities ===
- Arvada (part)
- Edgewater
- Golden
- Lakewood
- Littleton (part)
- Westminster (part)
- Wheat Ridge

=== Towns ===
- Bow Mar (part)
- Lakeside
- Morrison
- Mountain View
- Superior (part)

=== Census-designated places ===
- Applewood
- Aspen Park
- Brook Forest (part)
- Coal Creek (part)
- Columbine (part)
- Dakota Ridge
- East Pleasant View
- Evergreen
- Fairmount
- Genesee
- Idledale
- Indian Hills
- Ken Caryl
- Kittredge
- West Pleasant View

=== Unincorporated communities ===
- Buffalo Creek
- Conifer
- Foxton
- Pine
- Pine Junction
- Plastic
- West Lochwood (a covenant-controlled community)

== See also ==
- Bibliography of Colorado
- Geography of Colorado
- History of Colorado
  - Arapahoe County, Kansas Territory
  - National Register of Historic Places listings in Jefferson County, Colorado
- Index of Colorado-related articles
- List of Colorado-related lists
  - List of counties in Colorado
  - List of statistical areas in Colorado
- Outline of Colorado
  - Front Range Urban Corridor
