= Mount Lindo =

Mountain in Colorado, United States

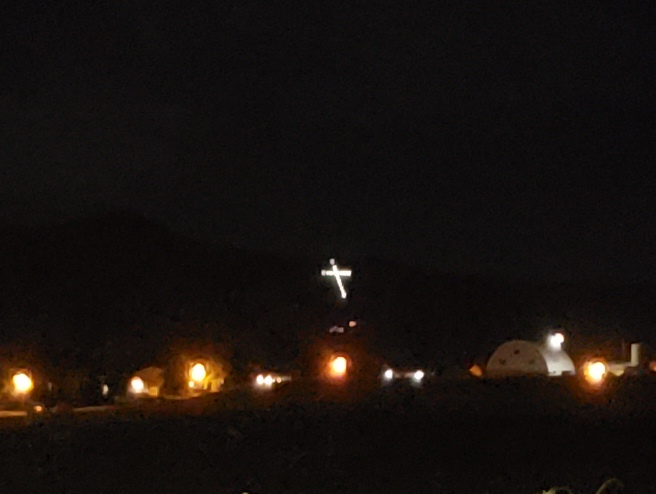
- Mt. Lindo at night as seen from near U.S. 285

Highest point
- Elevation: 7,814 ft (2,382 m)
- Coordinates: 39.609127°N 105.210571°W

Geography
- Location within Colorado
- Location: Jefferson County, Colorado
- Parent range: Front Range
- Topo map: USGS Mount Lindo

Mount Lindo is a summit near Morrison, Colorado in Jefferson County, Colorado, in the United States. With an elevation of 7,814 feet (2,382 m), Mount Lindo is the 4,256th highest summit in the state of Colorado. While not notable for its height, Mount Lindo is known locally for the 393-foot (120 m) lighted cross erected on its eastern face, which can be seen at night for miles across the Denver metropolitan area. The cross is near U.S. Route 285.

== History ==
Francis C. Van Derbur owned the land on Mount Lindo in the 1940s, and he built the cross near his resting place so that his wife could see it from her Denver home after he died. Donald Frees assisted with the design of the cross, which was first lit on the morning of March 29, 1964.

In 2015, the cross underwent a restoration.
