= Centennial Cone =

Mountain in the U.S. state of Colorado

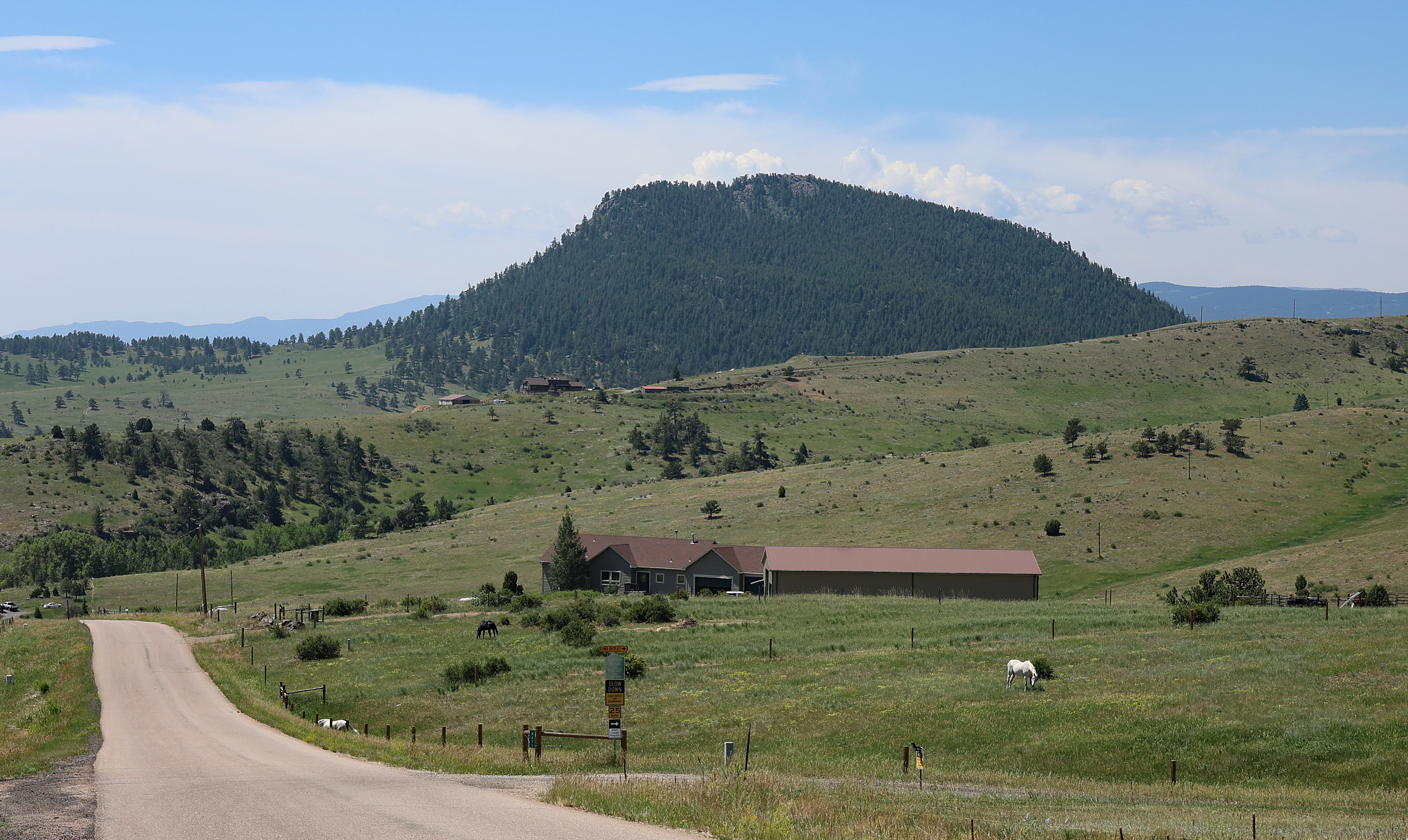
- The mountain in 2024

Highest point
- Elevation: 8,649 ft (2,636 m)
- Prominence: 783 ft (239 m)
- Isolation: 2.05 mi (3.30 km)
- Coordinates: 39°45′8.99″N 105°21′32.40″W

Geography
- Location within Colorado
- Location: Jefferson County, Colorado
- Parent range: Front Range
- Topo map(s): USGS; Ralston Buttes

Centennial Cone is a 8,649-foot (2,636-meter) mountain in Jefferson County, Colorado. Centennial Cone Park takes its name from the mountain. The park features a 12-mile (19-kilometer) long equestrian, mountain biking, and hiking trail that offers scenic views and wildlife viewing.

== Name ==
The mountain's original name was Sheep Mountain. The Colorado Mountain Club then petitioned the U.S. Board on Geographic Names to change the name to Centennial Cone. The change request was approved on August 7, 1912.

== Geology ==
The mountain has a pegmatite deposit that includes biotite granite gneiss, quartz-albite-muscovite, and quartz-microcline-muscovite. At one time, there was a beryllium mine on the peak.
