= Jefferson County Public Library =

Public library in Colorado, United States

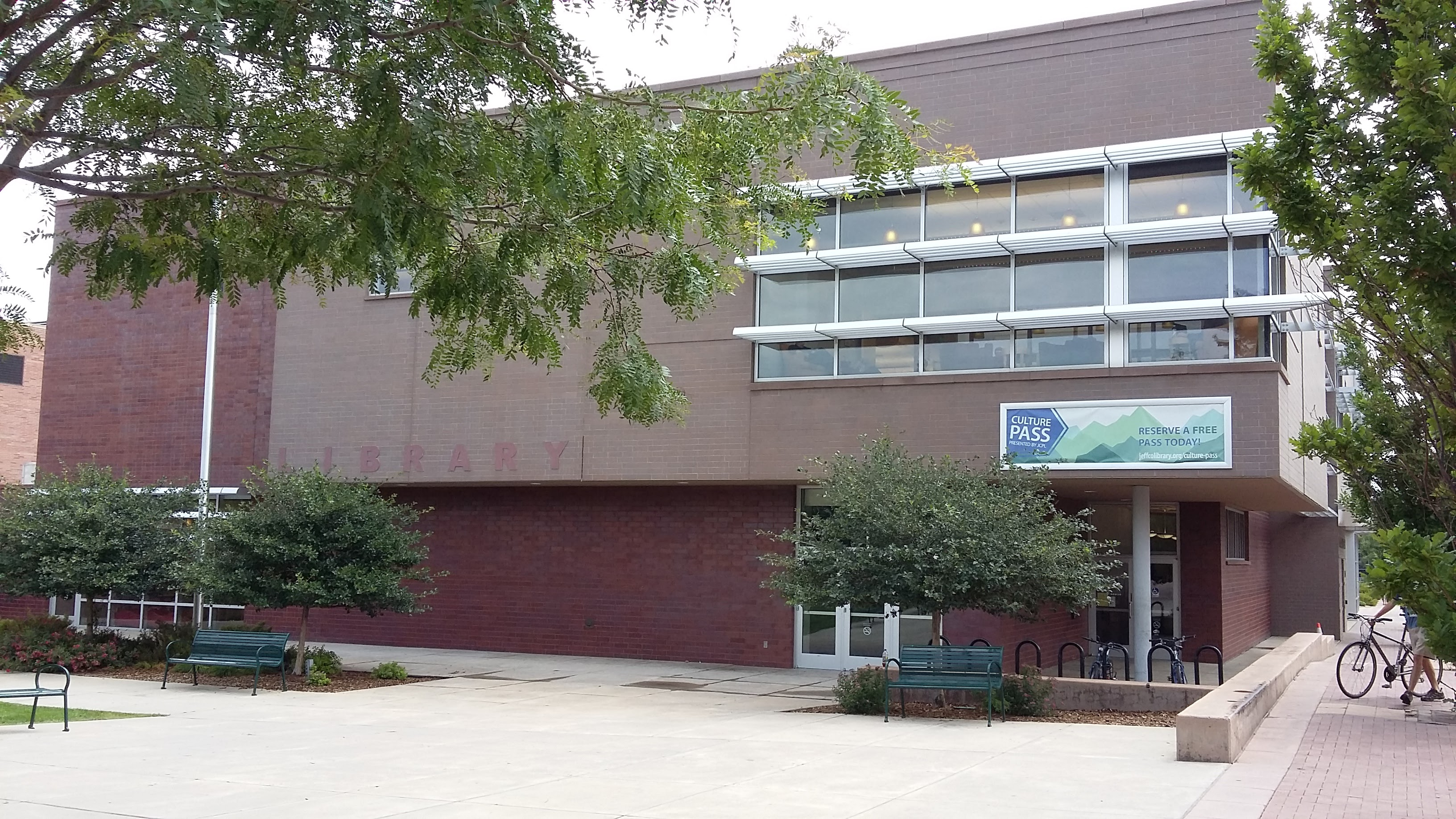
- The Arvada Library
- 39°44′49″N 105°06′49″W
- Location: Jefferson County, Colorado; United States
- Established: 1952
- Branches: 10

Collection
- Size: 1.3 million

Access and use
- Circulation: 7,900,913 (2016)
- Members: 361,881 (2016)

Other information
- Budget: $13,729,434 (2017)
- Director: Donna Walker
- Website: https://jeffcolibrary.org/

Jefferson County Public Library (JCPL) serves Jefferson County, Colorado, United States, and is the third largest public library in the state. Its service area spans from the foothills of Colorado's Rocky Mountains to the edge of the metro Denver area. It serves a diverse set of Colorado communities, from Lakewood, (pop. 144,000) to Morrison (pop. 420), to unincorporated areas of the county (pop. 190,000). The demographics of the populations served are equally diverse, ranging from the very wealthy to the poor and underserved.

The library's mission is to meet the changing needs of their communities by providing information and environments that promote personal growth and community transformation. A library card gives access to the system's 10 libraries, Bookmobile, traveling children's library, and mobile computer training lab. The library offers a collection of more than 1.3 million books, periodicals, CDs and DVDs, in addition to computer and Internet resources.

Over the past decade, services across the system have continued to grow, with most nearly doubling in use. Online use alone has increased nearly 20-fold. In recent years the library has introduced self-checkout and holds pickup. Downloadable music, audiobooks and eBooks are available 24/7.

== JCPL history ==
Established in 1952, Jefferson County Public Library was founded on a commitment to freedom through knowledge for all residents. It began when several small municipal libraries came together under one system. During its 59-year history as a county library system, the collection has grown from 35,000 items to more than 1.3 million items. Revenue has increased from $10,000 to $25.6 million.

=== JCPL Workers Unionize ===
On March 7, 2024, workers at the Jefferson County Public Library overwhelmingly voted to form a Union with the American Federation of State, County, and Municipal Employees. The 350 JCPL workers voted 213-62 to become the first county workers to organize under Colorado Senate Bill 22-230. JCPL workers have been contending with a number of issues, including low wages and workplace safety. Safety in particular was a concern, as libraries have become ground zero in culture wars and default social service agencies.

== Community opportunities ==
Each year, JCPL supports thousands of children with programs and services designed to promote early literacy, academic achievement, socialization, workforce readiness and more. Storytimes are held at each library for children of all ages.

In January 2011, JCPL launched the "Every Child Ready to Read" effort, which seeks to inform parents of their crucial role as their child's first teacher. This program provides literacy resources for parents and their children.

The annual Summer Challenge holds a long tradition of stopping the "summer slide." Research conducted by the Department of Education reveals that students make steady progress in their reading skills during the school year, but if they don't continue to read over the summer risk, a noticeable decline in both their reading and spelling skills. This is most evident among low-income students, who can lose the equivalent of around two months of literacy skills each summer.

The Traveling Children's Library (TCL) enhances the early literacy experiences of preschool-aged children by delivering books and programs to children in Head Start and other classrooms. Through a monthly bilingual storytime visit from JCPL staff and a monthly deposit of books in English and Spanish, the TCL provides children with greater exposure to books, reading and stories. The TCL also works to educate children's families about the free services and materials available to them through the public library, and how parents, as a child’s first teacher, can help develop their child's pre-reading skills.

=== Facilities ===
JCPL patrons have access to several meeting rooms and smaller study rooms to conduct business or organizational meetings.

=== Programs ===
The library offers classes and programs for adults and seniors; discussion groups that focus on current global issues, online databases and research resources; and the InSight & InPerson Distinguished Author Series. Twice a month, JCPL's Bookmobile delivers library resources to retirement communities, independent living and assisted living facilities in the county. The library also offers the Homebound Service, which delivers library materials to homebound individuals and assisted-living and nursing care facilities.

The library also provides instruction on basic computer skills, downloadable audio and eBooks, and a mobile computer training lab.

Patrons may take part in the Culture Pass program, which allows library card holders to visit participating cultural institutions using the library's membership.

== Jefferson County Library Foundation and Friends ==
The Jefferson County Library Foundation and Friends works to support and enrich the capabilities, resources and services of Jefferson County Public library through fundraising and advocacy efforts that benefit the community. It is a county-wide organization of volunteers dedicated to enhancing library programs and resources.

== Branches ==
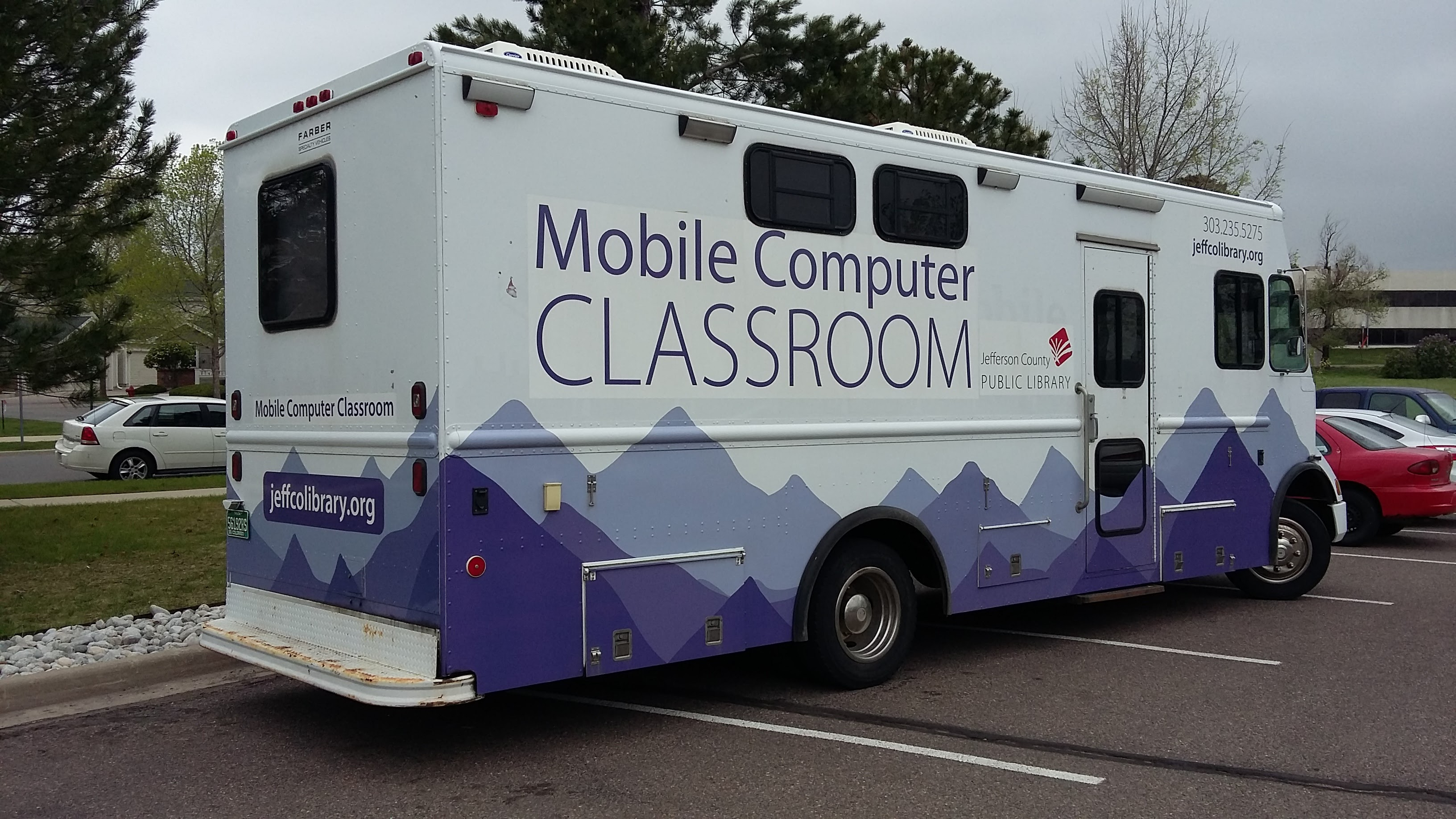
The JCPL Bookmobile

Branch	Address
Arvada Library	7525 W. 57th Ave, Arvada
Belmar Library	555 S. Allison Parkway, Lakewood
Columbine Library	7706 W. Bowles Ave, Littleton
Conifer Library	10441 Highway 73, Conifer
Edgewater Library	5843 W. 25th Ave, Denver
Evergreen Library	5000 Co Rd, Evergreen
Golden Library	1019 10th St, Golden
Lakewood Library	10200 W. 20th Ave, Lakewood
Standley Lake Library	8485 Kipling St, Arvada
Wheat Ridge Library	5475 W. 32nd Ave, Wheat Ridge
