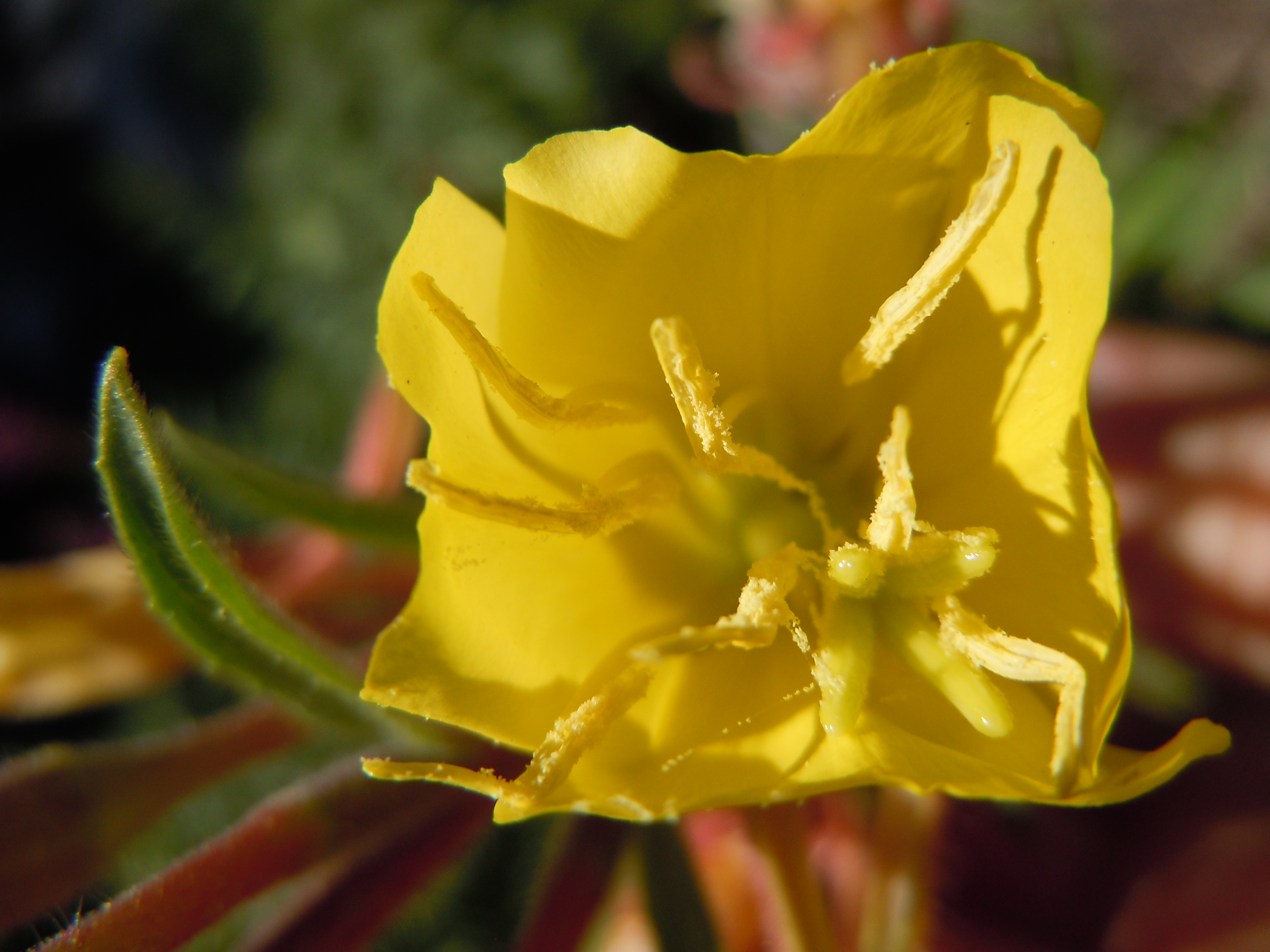
- Close-up of flower
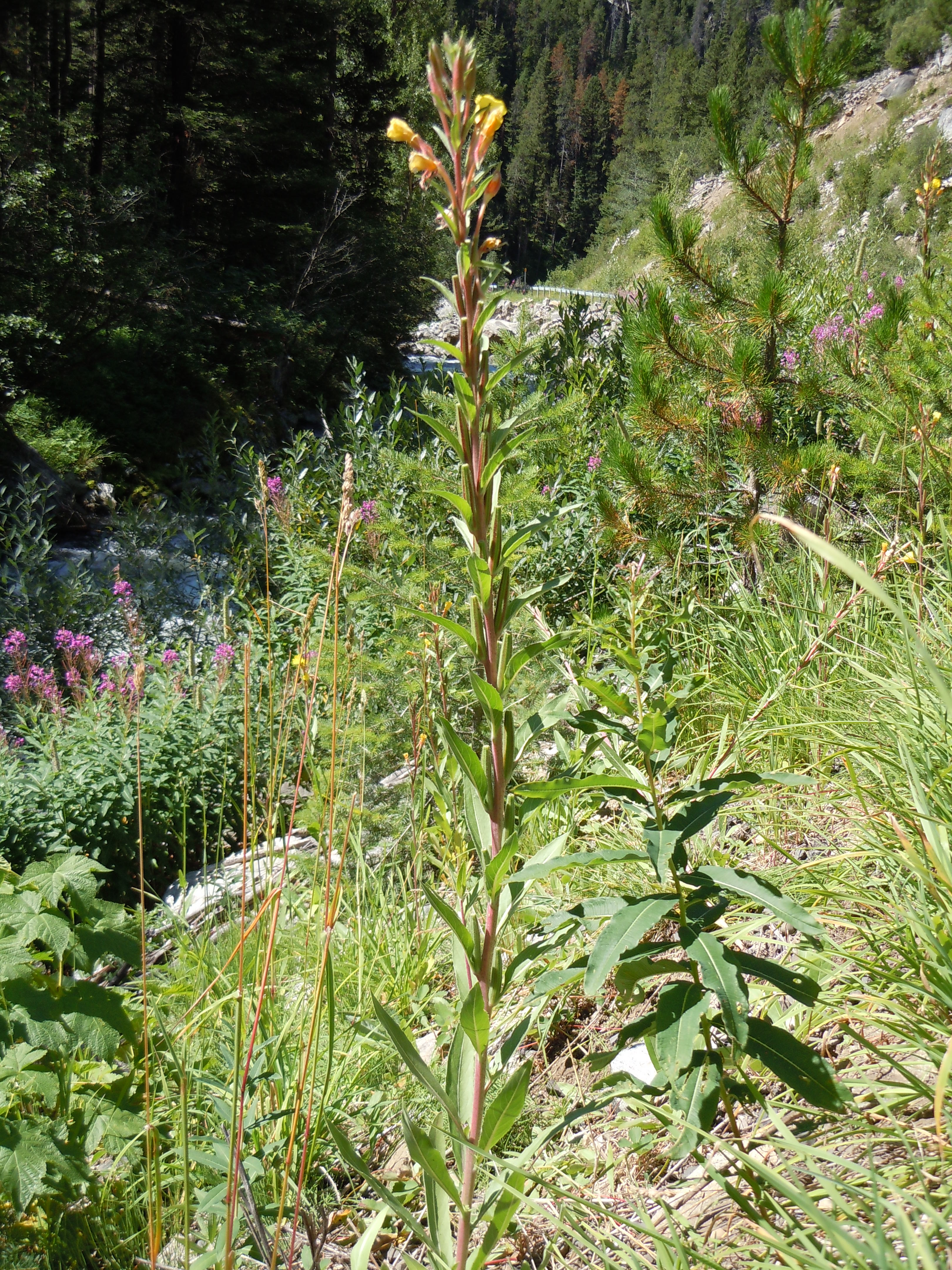
- Habit

Conservation status
- Secure (NatureServe)

Scientific classification
- Kingdom: Plantae
- Clade: Embryophytes
- Clade: Tracheophytes
- Clade: Spermatophytes
- Clade: Angiosperms
- Clade: Eudicots
- Clade: Rosids
- Order: Myrtales
- Family: Onagraceae
- Genus: Oenothera
- Species: O. villosa

Binomial name
- Oenothera villosa Thunb.

Subspecies
- O. v. subsp. strigosa; O. v. subsp. villosa

Synonyms
- List: Oenothera albinervis; Oenothera baurii; Oenothera canovertex; Oenothera canovirens; Oenothera cheradophila; Oenothera cockerellii; Oenothera depressa; Oenothera erosa; Oenothera hungarica; Oenothera prasina; Oenothera procera; Oenothera renneri; Oenothera rydbergii; Oenothera scandinavica; Oenothera strigosa; Oenothera subulifera; Oenothera velutinifolia; Onagra cockerellii; Onagra depressa; Onagra erosa; Onagra hungarica; Onagra lehmanniana; Onagra strigosa; Usoricum strigosum

= Oenothera villosa =

Plant species in the evening primrose family

Oenothera villosa, the hairy evening primrose, is a species of flowering plant in the family Onagraceae. It is native to nearly all of the United States (except Hawaii, Alaska, Louisiana, Florida, and South Carolina), and to all Canadian provinces and the Northwest Territories. It has been introduced to cool and cold-temperate regions worldwide. An erect biennial reaching 3–6 feet (0.91–1.83 m), it is typically found in open areas and disturbed situations.

== Description ==
This plant is a taproot dicotyledon (two stem leaves) biennial that has a red stem and is strigillose. This term means hairy. In this Scenario, the plant is covered in trichome hairs. The hairs are considered erect. This means that they stick straight out from the stem, not in a curled manner. The leaves are usually green in color and can have fully denticulate margins or part entire (smooth edges), part denticulate margins. in rarer scenarios the leaves can have moderate dentate margins. This all means that the leaves usually have small teeth on their edges, or have parts of their leaves of small-toothed edges. Also the rare moderate dentate margins means that sometimes a plant can be found with somewhat larger teeth on its leaf borders.

The flowers inflorescent head, or the whole flower part of the plant is in the open position. The shoot growing structure called the apex is of the obtuse type. The plant has fruit capsules that do not measure any longer than the plants shoot internodes. This means that the fruit capsules are not longer than the spacings between the plants leaf nodes. The plants campanuate (bell shaped) yellow flowers have red stripes on the outer part of the flowers, so if someone views the flowers from the sides, not staring into the flowers, they appear as yellow, and painted with red stripes. The inside of the flowers are all yellow. The flowers are arranged into a terminal spike. This means that the flowers grow from the crown, which is the middle of the plant. These flowers bloom in the summer months in the United States which is from June through September. The plant has lanceolate leaves meaning sword shaped and have sinuate lobes which means the leaf lobes have a bending wavy pattern on their lobes. The leaves are mildly to moderately covered with hairs on their surfaces, front and back. The leaves sometimes have a coating of wax on their edges. The leaves measure 2.5 to 10 cm long or 1-4 inches. The herbaceous branches are covered in these fine hairs also. The yellow striped flowers measure 1.5- 3.5 cm in width or around 0.5 inches to 1 inch. This plant has cylindrical seed pods (capsules) that are 1.3 to 3 cm (0.5-1.3 inches) long. These pods are thick at the base. The seeds are very small being only 1.3 to 1.5 mm long. The seeds are self-pollinating. This plant can usually reach a height of around 3-5 feet ( can reach 6 or 7) according to some other sources) and can be found in waste lands, disturbed areas, and alongside roads etc. The plant can be found in almost all of the U.S states except a couple extreme cold and hot/humid states. A thing to state is that some of my sources come from a species called Oenothera biennis which is in the same family and order, this is a subspecies of this plant with a few differences such as the hair (trichomes) on the stems, but most of the height and flower characteristics are very similar.

== Taxonomy ==
Oenothera villosa was given its scientific name by Carl Peter Thunberg in 1794. It is classified in the genus Oenothera as part of the Onagraceae family. It has two accepted subspecies:

- Oenothera villosa subsp. strigosa (Rydb.) W.Dietr. & P.H.Raven – western and central North America, and introduced to central Europe
- Oenothera villosa subsp. villosa – central and eastern North America, and introduced worldwide

Oenothera villosa has 48 synonyms of its two subspecies including 24 species.

Table of Synonyms
Name	Year	Rank	Synonym of:	Notes
Oenothera albinervis R.R.Gates	1936	species	subsp. villosa	= het.
Oenothera baurii Boedijn	1924	species	subsp. villosa	= het.
Oenothera biennis subsp. baurii (Boedijn) Tischler	1950	subspecies	subsp. villosa	= het.
Oenothera biennis var. canescens Torr. & A.Gray	1840	variety	subsp. villosa	= het.
Oenothera biennis var. strigosa (Rydb.) Cronquist	1992	variety	subsp. strigosa	≡ hom.
Oenothera canovertex Hudziok	1968	species	subsp. villosa	= het.
Oenothera canovirens E.S.Steele	1911	species	subsp. villosa	= het.
Oenothera cheradophila Bartlett	1907	species	subsp. strigosa	= het.
Oenothera cockerellii Bartlett ex de Vries	1913	species	subsp. villosa	= het.
Oenothera communis proles erosa (Lehm.) H.Lév.	1909	proles	subsp. villosa	= het.
Oenothera depressa Greene	1891	species	subsp. villosa	= het.
Oenothera depressa f. angustifolia Rostański	1965	form	subsp. villosa	= het.
Oenothera depressa f. latibracteata Rostański	1965	form	subsp. villosa	= het.
Oenothera erosa Lehm.	1828	species	subsp. villosa	= het.
Oenothera hookeri var. parviflora R.R.Gates	1915	variety	subsp. villosa	= het.
Oenothera hungarica (Borbás) Borbás	1903	species	subsp. villosa	= het.
Oenothera muricata var. canescens (Torr. & A.Gray) B.L.Rob.	1908	variety	subsp. villosa	= het.
Oenothera muricata f. hungarica (Borbás) Jáv.	1924	form	subsp. villosa	= het.
Oenothera parviflora var. canescens (Torr. & A.Gray) Farw.	1923	variety	subsp. villosa	= het.
Oenothera prasina Bartlett	1914	species	subsp. strigosa	= het., nom. nud.
Oenothera procera Wooton & Standl.	1913	species	subsp. strigosa	= het.
Oenothera renneri H.Scholz	1956	species	subsp. villosa	= het.
Oenothera renneri f. mollis Renner ex Rostański	1965	form	subsp. villosa	= het.
Oenothera rydbergii House	1921	species	subsp. strigosa	≡ hom., nom. superfl.
Oenothera scandinavica Rostański	2007	species	subsp. villosa	= het.
Oenothera strigosa (Rydb.) Mack. & Bush	1902	species	subsp. strigosa	≡ hom.
Oenothera strigosa var. albinervis (R.R.Gates) R.R.Gates	1957	variety	subsp. villosa	= het.
Oenothera strigosa subsp. canovirens (E.S.Steele) Munz	1965	subspecies	subsp. villosa	= het.
Oenothera strigosa subsp. cheradophila (Bartlett) Munz	1965	subspecies	subsp. strigosa	= het.
Oenothera strigosa var. cheradophila (Bartlett) R.R.Gates	1957	variety	subsp. strigosa	= het.
Oenothera strigosa var. cockerellii (Bartlett ex de Vries) R.R.Gates	1957	variety	subsp. villosa	= het.
Oenothera strigosa var. depressa (Greene) R.R.Gates	1958	variety	subsp. villosa	= het.
Oenothera strigosa subsp. hungarica (Borbás) Á.Löve & D.Löve	1961	subspecies	subsp. villosa	= het.
Oenothera strigosa var. procera (Wooton & Standl.) R.R.Gates	1957	variety	subsp. strigosa	= het.
Oenothera strigosa var. subulifera (Rydb.) R.R.Gates	1957	variety	subsp. strigosa	= het.
Oenothera subulifera (Rydb.) Rydb.	1913	species	subsp. strigosa	= het.
Oenothera velutinifolia Hudziok	1968	species	subsp. villosa	= het.
Oenothera villosa subsp. cheradophila (Bartlett) W.Dietr. & P.H.Raven	1976	subspecies	subsp. strigosa	= het.
Oenothera villosa var. strigosa (Rydb.) Dorn	1988	variety	subsp. strigosa	≡ hom.
Onagra biennis var. strigosa (Rydb.) Piper	1901	variety	subsp. strigosa	≡ hom.
Onagra cockerellii (Bartlett ex de Vries) de Vries	1913	species	subsp. villosa	= het.
Onagra depressa (Greene) Small	1896	species	subsp. villosa	= het.
Onagra erosa (Lehm.) Spach	1835	species	subsp. villosa	= het.
Onagra hungarica Borbás	1902	species	subsp. villosa	= het.
Onagra lehmanniana Spach	1835	species	subsp. villosa	= het.
Onagra strigosa Rydb.	1900	species	subsp. strigosa	≡ hom.
Onagra strigosa var. subulata Rydb.	1900	variety	subsp. strigosa	= het.
Usoricum strigosum (Rydb.) Lunell	1916	species	subsp. strigosa	≡ hom.
Notes: ≡ homotypic synonym; = heterotypic synonym

== Uses ==
This plant is not as common for use as some other garden or culinary plants, but it has some notable ones. A few people have planted Oenothera Villosa in gardens. This plant can be used to attract butterflies (lepidopterans) and other pollinating insects/birds. The plant has a chemical compound omega fatty-acid called Gamma Linolenic Acid (GLA) that is found in the oil called Evening Primrose Oil (EPO). This oil from a few of the closely related primrose plants including the hairy evening primrose is thought to be an ingredient that is active in some therapeutic medicine. This oil is found in the seeds of this primrose plant. The oil is being used to treat some conditions/disorders that can be targeted by using these helpful omega fatty acids found in the oil. However, the accuracy and efficacy of this oil actually relieving and treating some of these conditions is still being debated among medical people as of 2007.

Some treatment uses of EPO are in Assistive Reproductive health Technologies (ART) and medicine. This oil is being used to treat certain reproductive diseases/conditions such as female breast inflammation, Euteral diabetes, other inflammation, and menopause/menstrual disorders. Some women take this oil with the medicine before birth to help with reproductive qualities, and some have not experienced any harmful effects from its use.

This oil is prescribed for these illnesses due to its potential benefits in this field, so this is not 100 percent proven to help with these conditions.
