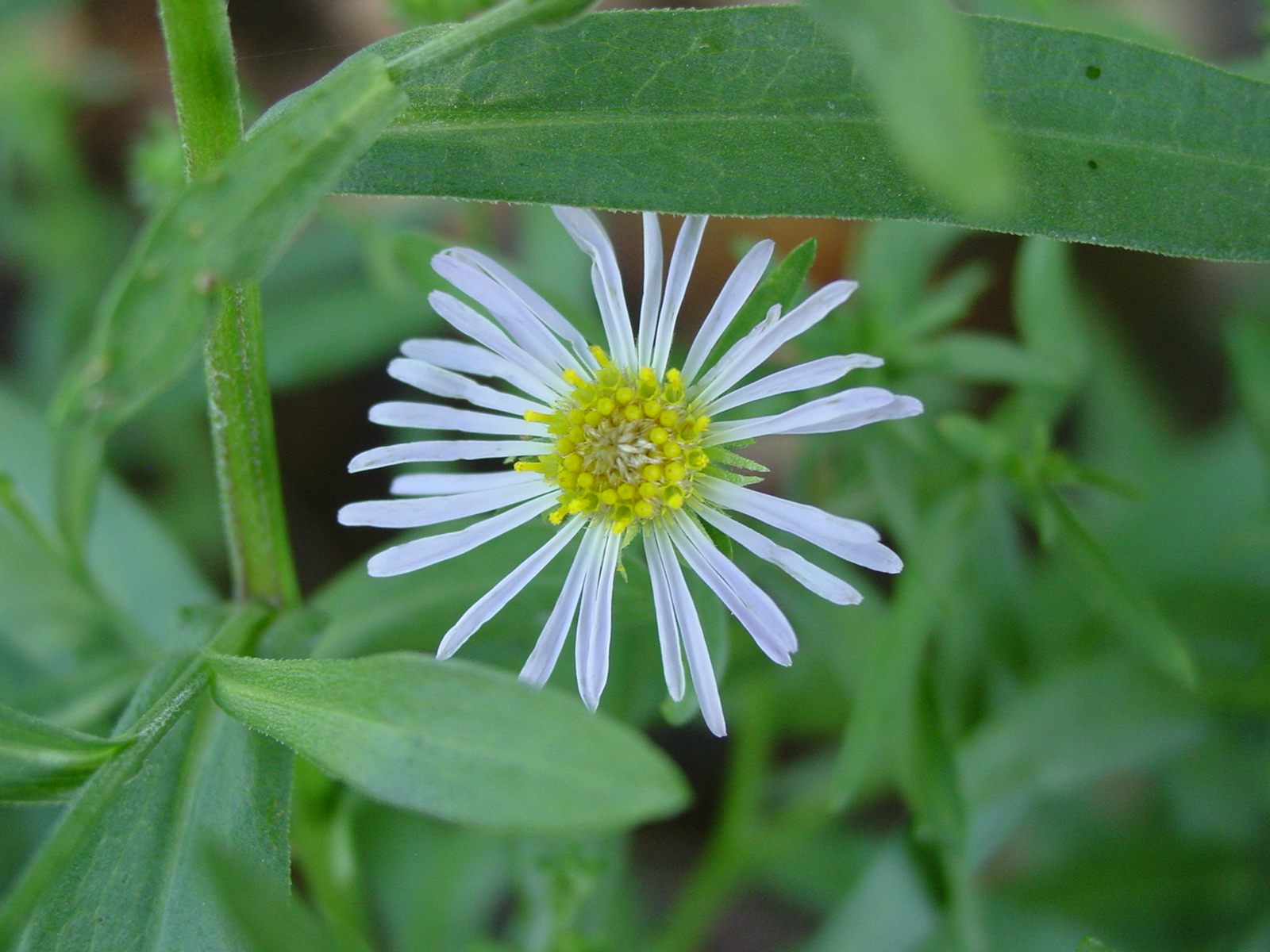

Conservation status
- Secure (NatureServe)

Scientific classification
- Kingdom: Plantae
- Clade: Tracheophytes
- Clade: Angiosperms
- Clade: Eudicots
- Clade: Asterids
- Order: Asterales
- Family: Asteraceae
- Genus: Erigeron
- Species: E. divergens

Binomial name
- Erigeron divergens Torr. & A.Gray

Synonyms
- Erigeron accedens Greene; Erigeron divaricatus Nutt. 1840, illegitimate homonym not Michx. 1803; Erigeron divaricatum Nutt.; Erigeron incomptus A.Gray; Erigeron ramosus Raf.; Erigeron solisaltator G.L.Nesom

= Erigeron divergens =

Species of flowering plant

Erigeron divergens is a species of flowering plant in the family Asteraceae known by the common name spreading fleabane. It is native to western North America.

This plant is highly variable in form. It is an annual or perennial herb growing from a taproot and sometimes a caudex. It produces one to many stems 7 to 70 centimeters (3 to 27 1/2 inches) tall. It is a hairy plant, and the hairs are usually glandular, at least near the top of the stem. The basal leaves are 1 to 7 cm (1/2 to 3 in) long, and leaves higher on the stem are smaller. Flowering from April to September, the inflorescence can hold over 100 flower heads, each about 2.5 cm (1 in) wide. The heads have 75 to 150 ray florets not more than 1 cm long which are white in color, fading purple, and sometimes absent. There are many yellow disc florets at the center. The fruit is seed-like and about 1 millimeter (1/16 in) long with bristles on the tip.

The species exhibits agamospermy, asexual reproduction via seeds. Many, but not all, individuals are polyploid. There are many similar species both inside and outside the genus.

This plant can be found in the western half of the United States (as far east as western Texas), the Canadian provinces of British Columbia and Alberta, and the Mexican states of Baja California, Chihuahua, Durango, Nuevo León, and Sonora. It occurs in many types of habitat, including desert shrublands and scrubs, grassland, meadows, pinyon–juniper woodland, oak and pine woodlands, riparian habitat, sagebrush, and disturbed areas.

This plant had a number of uses in Native American traditional medicine. The Navajo used it as an aid in childbirth, as a lotion, an eyewash, and a treatment for snakebite and headache. It was a good luck charm among the Kiowa people.

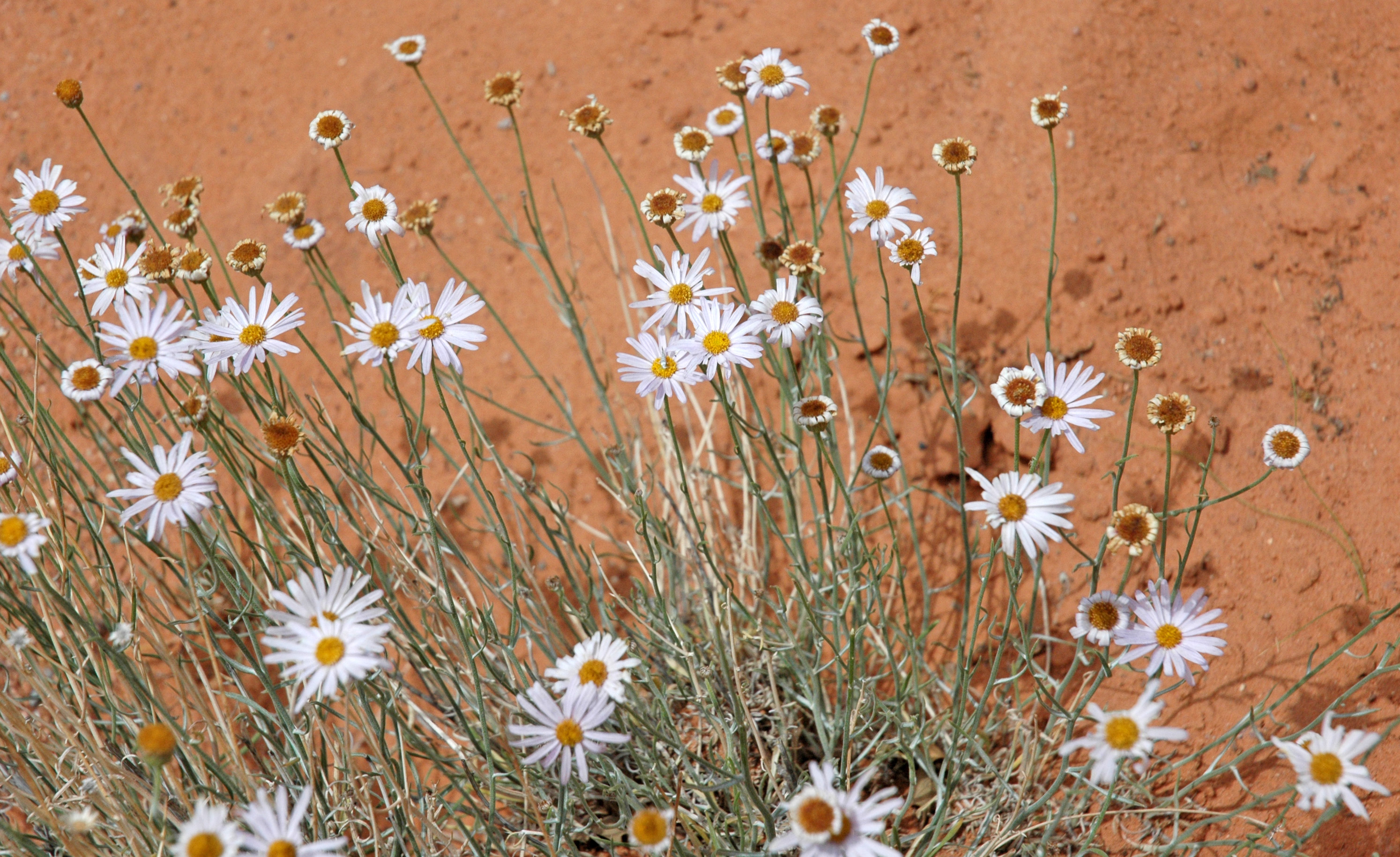
Erigeron divergens, Arches National Park
