= Crown Hill, South Dakota =

Coordinates: 44°26′40″N 103°52′17″W

Crown Hill is a ghost town in Lawrence County, in the U.S. state of South Dakota.

== History ==
Crown Hill took its name from the nearby Crown Hill Mine, operated by the Crown Mining Company.
