= Crown Hill, West Virginia =

Unincorporated community in West Virginia, United States

- Unincorporated community
- Location within West Virginia Location within the United States
- Coordinates: 38°12′00″N 81°21′49″W
- Country: United States
- State: West Virginia
- County: Kanawha
- Elevation: 633 ft (193 m)
- Time zone: UTC-5 (Eastern (EST))
  - Summer (DST): UTC-4 (EDT)
- Area codes: 304 & 681
- GNIS feature ID: 1554232

Crown Hill is an unincorporated community in Kanawha County, West Virginia, United States. Crown Hill is located on the south bank of the Kanawha River along West Virginia Route 61, 1.8 miles (2.9 km) west-southwest of Pratt. Crown Hill once had a post office, which closed on February 1, 1997.
