= Crown Hill Cemetery (disambiguation) =

Crown Hill Cemetery is a cemetery in Indianapolis, Indiana.

Crown Hill Cemetery may also refer to:

- Crown Hill National Cemetery, a section of Crown Hill Cemetery in Indianapolis
- Crown Hill Cemetery, in Vermilion County, Illinois
