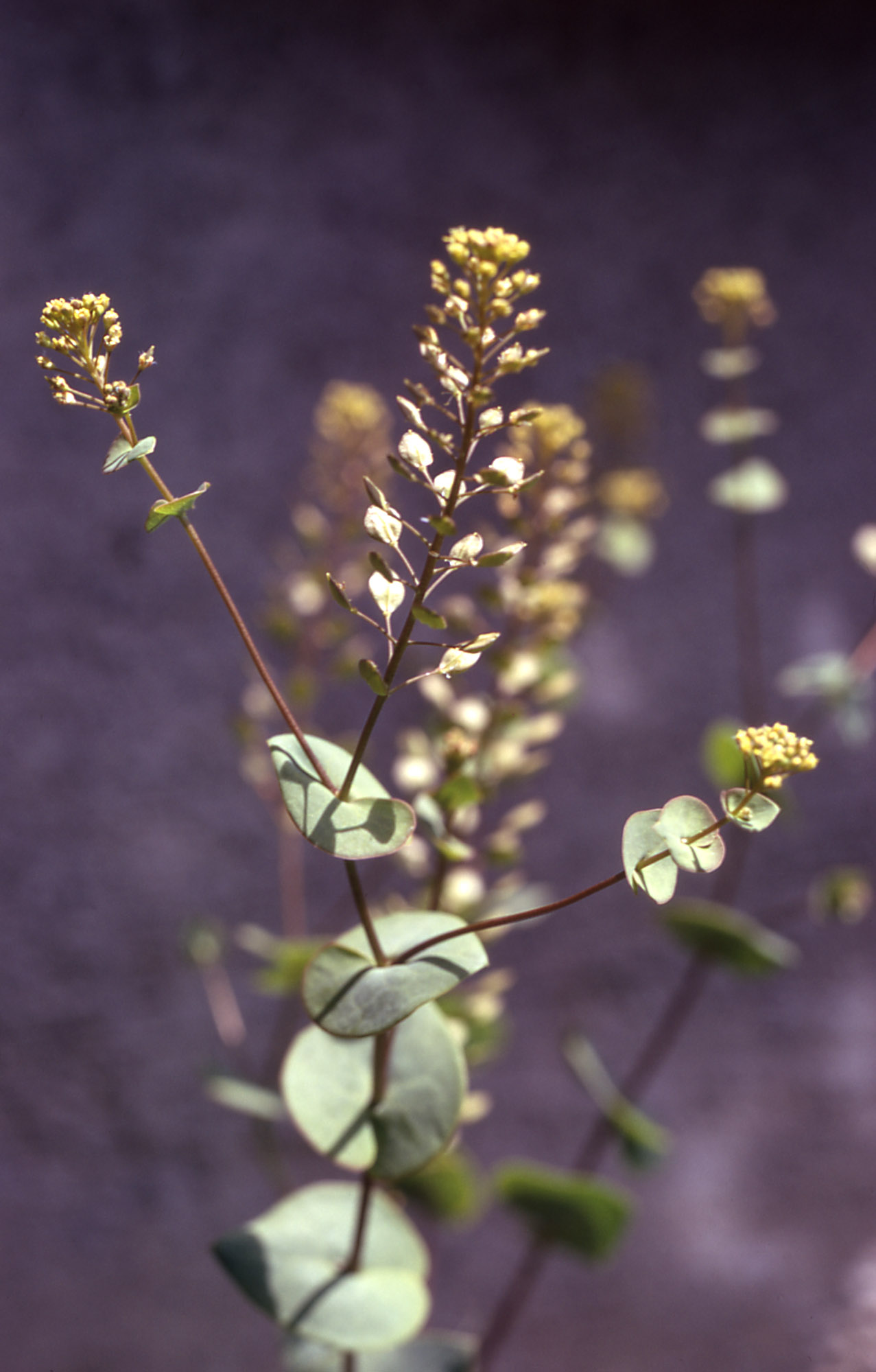

Scientific classification
- Kingdom: Plantae
- Clade: Tracheophytes
- Clade: Angiosperms
- Clade: Eudicots
- Clade: Rosids
- Order: Brassicales
- Family: Brassicaceae
- Genus: Lepidium
- Species: L. perfoliatum

Binomial name
- Lepidium perfoliatum L.

= Lepidium perfoliatum =

Species of flowering plant

Lepidium perfoliatum is a species of flowering plant in the mustard family known by the common names clasping pepperweed and perfoliate pepperwort. It is native to Europe and Asia and it can be found in other parts of the world as an introduced species.

This is an annual or biennial herb producing an erect stem to a maximum height near 60 centimeters. Leaves at the base of the plant are divided into linear lobes, while the leaves higher up on the stem are rounded to oval in shape and surround the stem. The tip of the stem is occupied by an inflorescence of very small flowers, each with yellow petals only 1 or 2 millimeters (0.039 or 0.079 in) long. The fruit is a flattened oval or diamond-shaped capsule about 4 millimeters (0.16 in) long.
