= Politics of Colorado =

US state politics

Colorado operates under a constitution adopted in 1876 and features both a traditional three-branch system of government and extensive direct democracy mechanisms, including citizen initiatives and referendums.

Colorado's political landscape has evolved significantly, transitioning from a swing state to a blue state in the early 21st century, though maintaining distinctive features like high voter participation and strong independent voting blocs. The state government consists of an executive branch led by the Governor of Colorado, a bicameral Colorado General Assembly, and a judiciary headed by the Colorado Supreme Court.

Colorado was a pioneer in women's suffrage, becoming the second state to grant women voting rights in 1893 and the first to do so by popular referendum.

Notable aspects of Colorado politics include its robust ballot initiative system, which has produced significant reforms like the Taxpayer Bill of Rights, and demographic shifts particularly in the Denver metropolitan area that have reshaped electoral patterns. The state has also pioneered various electoral innovations, including universal mail-in voting and being among the first states to legalize marijuana through popular vote.

== Historical development ==
=== Early political history (1876–1920) ===
Colorado entered the Union as the 38th state in 1876, during a period of significant populist and progressive influence. In its early years, the state showed strong support for the Populist Party, electing several candidates to federal and state offices between the 1890s and 1910s.

The state's early political dynamics were significantly influenced by silver mining interests. The Sherman Silver Purchase Act of 1890, which required the federal government to purchase large quantities of silver, was particularly important to Colorado's economy and politics. The act was championed by Colorado Senator Henry M. Teller, who later left the Republican Party over the gold standard issue. When President Grover Cleveland pushed for the act's repeal in 1893, it led to significant political upheaval in Colorado, contributing to the rise of the Populist movement and silver-based political coalitions.

The subsequent Panic of 1893 devastated Colorado's silver-based economy and reshaped the state's political landscape. Many miners and rural residents aligned with the Populist Party, which advocated for free silver coinage and economic reforms. This period marked one of the few times in American history where a third party achieved significant electoral success at the state level.

=== Mid-20th century (1920–1990) ===
The state predominantly voted Republican in presidential elections between 1920 and 1990, with only four Democratic victories during this period (1932, 1936, 1948, and 1964). However, state-level politics often favored Democrats, who typically positioned themselves as more moderate than their national counterparts.

=== Shifting political landscape (1990–present) ===
United States presidential election results for Colorado
Year	Republican		Democratic		Third party(ies)	
Year	No.	%	No.	%	No.	%
1880	27,450	51.26%	24,647	46.03%	1,449	2.71%
1884	36,084	54.25%	27,723	41.68%	2,712	4.08%
1888	50,772	55.22%	37,549	40.84%	3,625	3.94%
1892	38,620	41.13%	0	0.00%	55,271	58.87%
1896	26,271	13.86%	161,005	84.95%	2,263	1.19%
1900	93,072	42.04%	122,733	55.43%	5,603	2.53%
1904	134,661	55.26%	100,105	41.08%	8,901	3.65%
1908	123,693	46.88%	126,644	48.00%	13,521	5.12%
1912	58,386	21.88%	114,232	42.80%	94,262	35.32%
1916	102,308	34.75%	178,816	60.74%	13,251	4.50%
1920	173,248	59.32%	104,936	35.93%	13,869	4.75%
1924	195,171	57.02%	75,238	21.98%	71,851	20.99%
1928	253,872	64.72%	133,131	33.94%	5,239	1.34%
1932	189,617	41.43%	250,877	54.81%	17,202	3.76%
1936	181,267	37.09%	295,021	60.37%	12,396	2.54%
1940	279,576	50.92%	265,554	48.37%	3,874	0.71%
1944	268,731	53.21%	234,331	46.40%	1,977	0.39%
1948	239,714	46.52%	267,288	51.88%	8,235	1.60%
1952	379,782	60.27%	245,504	38.96%	4,817	0.76%
1956	394,479	59.49%	263,997	39.81%	4,598	0.69%
1960	402,242	54.63%	330,629	44.91%	3,375	0.46%
1964	296,767	38.19%	476,024	61.27%	4,195	0.54%
1968	409,345	50.46%	335,174	41.32%	66,680	8.22%
1972	597,189	62.61%	329,980	34.59%	26,715	2.80%
1976	584,367	54.05%	460,353	42.58%	36,415	3.37%
1980	652,264	55.07%	367,973	31.07%	164,178	13.86%
1984	821,818	63.44%	454,974	35.12%	18,589	1.44%
1988	728,177	53.06%	621,453	45.28%	22,764	1.66%
1992	562,850	35.87%	629,681	40.13%	376,649	24.00%
1996	691,848	45.80%	671,152	44.43%	147,704	9.78%
2000	883,745	50.75%	738,227	42.39%	119,393	6.86%
2004	1,101,256	51.69%	1,001,725	47.02%	27,344	1.28%
2008	1,073,629	44.71%	1,288,633	53.66%	39,200	1.63%
2012	1,185,243	46.09%	1,323,102	51.45%	63,501	2.47%
2016	1,202,484	43.25%	1,338,870	48.16%	238,893	8.59%
2020	1,364,607	41.90%	1,804,352	55.40%	88,021	2.70%
2024	1,377,441	43.14%	1,728,159	54.13%	87,145	2.73%

Colorado's political landscape began shifting in the 1990s. The state passed significant voter initiatives including Term Limits (1990) and the Taxpayer Bill of Rights (TABOR) (1992).

Democrats have held the governorship for 24 of the past 32 years since 1991, and since 2008, the state has voted Democratic in five consecutive presidential elections—the party's longest such streak in Colorado's history.

In the 1990s, various factors such as economic, historic racial and ideological diversity, and migration made Colorado and other western states in general more politically competitive.

In 2004, Democrats captured both chambers of the state legislature for the first time since 1963 and elected several Democrats, such as Ken Salazar to the U.S. Senate and his brother John Salazar to the 3rd Congressional District. With the election of Bill Ritter as governor in 2006, Democrats won a political trifecta.

By around 2010, Colorado was considered a swing state and by 2016, it was considered a blue-leaning swing state.

Colorado has been trending Democratic since the early 2000s due to the rising percentage of young, college-educated, suburban, and unaffiliated voters leaning Democratic. The increased organization and perceived spectrum of political beliefs (such as progressivism and centrism) within the state's Democratic Party has also been advanced as a reason for the political shift. The growing social and religious conservative shift of the state's Republican Party has also been cited as a reason for the changing voting patterns of Colorado, along with the party shifting right-ward politically.

The year 2018 saw the state undergo a political shift. In the 2018 state elections, Democrats gained control of the state Senate, won all the constitutional statewide offices (including the governorship), and expanded their majority in the state House. They also gained a numerical majority for the U.S. House delegation. By 2020, Colorado was considered a safe blue state, with Joe Biden winning by more than 13% over Donald Trump.

In 2024, Kamala Harris won Colorado by around a 11% margin, re-affirming the status of Colorado as a blue state. Demographic change and the expansion of Denver's suburbs into Republican-leaning counties have increasingly contributed to the Democratic shift. While several suburban Front Range counties like Jefferson continued trending Democratic, with Kamala Harris improving on Joe Biden's 2020 margins, turnout declined significantly in Democratic strongholds like Denver and Adams County which affected the margin of victory. Additionally, southern parts of the state, particularly counties with large Latino populations like Pueblo and those in the San Luis Valley, saw notable shifts toward Republicans.

== State government ==
=== Constitution ===
The Constitution of Colorado was drafted in March 1876 and ratified by Colorado's voters on July 1, 1876, taking effect upon Colorado's admission to statehood on August 1, 1876. The constitution establishes the structure and function of the state government and outlines the basic rights of Colorado citizens. It has been amended numerous times through both legislative referral and citizen initiative processes.

=== Executive branch ===
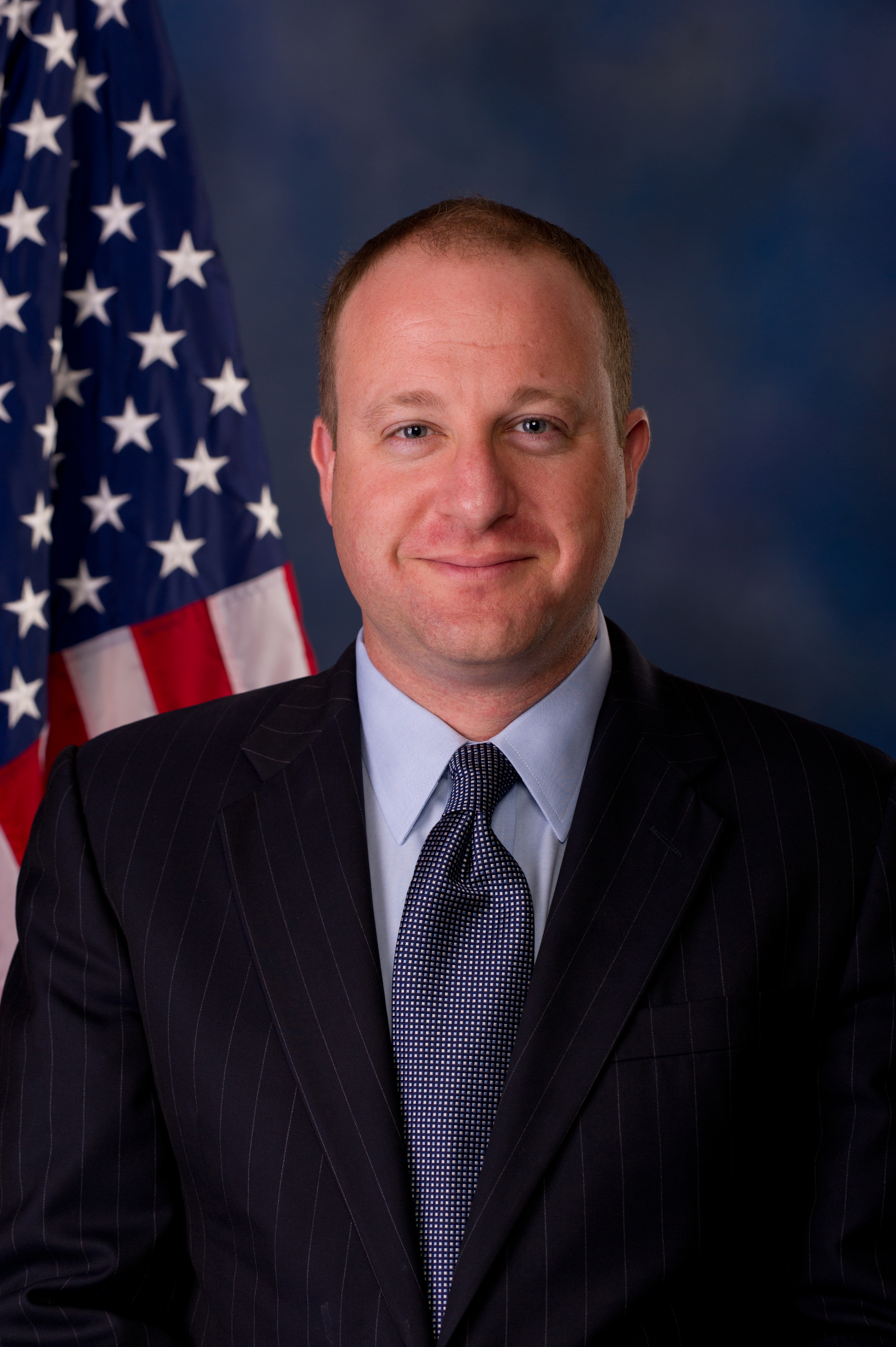
Democrat Jared Polis is the current incumbent Governor of Colorado.

Colorado has elected 17 Democrats and 12 Republicans to the governorship in the last 100 years. Incumbent Governor Jared Polis was elected in 2018. Polis and his predecessor, former Governor (now Senator) John Hickenlooper are both Democrats.

=== Legislative branch ===
The Colorado Senate is the upper house of the Colorado General Assembly, composed of 35 seats representing approximately 143,000 people each. Senators are constitutionally limited to two consecutive four-year terms. The Senate is currently composed of 23 Democrats and 12 Republicans. The Senate is led by President of the Senate James Coleman, Majority Leader Robert Rodriguez, and Minority Leader Paul Lundeen.

The Colorado House of Representatives is the lower house of the Colorado General Assembly, composed of 65 seats of approximately 77,000 people each. Representatives are constitutionally limited to four consecutive two-year terms. The House is currently composed of 46 Democrats and 19 Republicans and is led by Speaker of the House Julie McCluskie, Majority Leader Monica Duran, and Minority Leader Rose Pugliese.

=== Judicial branch ===
The Colorado Supreme Court is the state's highest court, consisting of seven justices who serve ten-year terms. The Chief Justice is selected by the court from amongst its members and serves as the executive head of the Colorado Judicial Branch. Justices are appointed by the governor from a list of three qualified candidates nominated by the Supreme Court Nominating Commission, and must stand for retention by voters in the next general election after serving a provisional two-year term.

The Colorado Court of Appeals is the state's intermediate appellate court, consisting of 22 judges who serve eight-year terms. The court hears cases in three-judge panels and primarily reviews decisions from the state's district courts.

Colorado's trial court system consists of district courts, county courts, and various specialized courts. The state is divided into 22 judicial districts, each with its own district court that handles civil cases involving more than $15,000, felony criminal cases, juvenile matters, and appeals from county courts. County courts handle civil cases under $15,000, misdemeanors, traffic infractions, and small claims.

In 2024, voters approved Amendment H, which established an independent judicial discipline commission to investigate complaints against judges, replacing the previous system where discipline was handled internally by the Supreme Court.

=== Direct democracy ===
Colorado has a strong tradition of direct democracy through initiatives, referendums, and recall elections. The state constitution reserves these powers explicitly for the people:

...the people reserve to themselves the power to propose laws and amendments to the constitution and to enact or reject the same at the polls independent of the general assembly and also reserve power at their own option to approve or reject at the polls any act or item, section, or part of any act of the general assembly.

Significant initiatives have included Term Limits (1990), the Taxpayer Bill of Rights (TABOR) (1992), and Amendment 23 (2000), which set a fixed percentage of the budget for K-12 education. Voters passed Referendum C in 2005, amending some restrictions of TABOR and Amendment 23.

== Recent events ==
=== 2024 ballot measures ===
In 2024, Colorado voters passed several significant constitutional amendments that reflected the state's evolving political landscape:

- Amendment 79 enshrined a right to legal abortion in the state constitution and lifted a 40-year ban on public funding for abortion
- Amendment J removed the 2006 same-sex marriage ban from the state constitution
- Amendment G expanded property tax exemptions for disabled veterans
- Amendment H established an independent judicial discipline board
- Amendment I prohibited bail for first-degree murder defendants

Several citizen initiatives also passed in 2024, including:

- Proposition 128, which increased minimum prison time served for violent crimes
- Proposition 130, which established dedicated funding for law enforcement
- Proposition KK, which created a new excise tax on firearms and ammunition sales

Notably, voters rejected Proposition 131, which would have fundamentally changed the state's election system by eliminating party primaries in favor of a top-four primary system and implementing ranked-choice voting for general elections. The proposed system would have allowed voters to rank candidates in order of preference, with the winner determined through an instant runoff process. The measure's defeat maintained Colorado's traditional party primary system.

=== 2024 supreme court case ===
In 2024, Colorado became the center of a major constitutional controversy when its supreme court ruled in Anderson v. Griswold that former President Donald Trump was ineligible to appear on the state's primary ballot under Section 3 of the Fourteenth Amendment due to his actions during the January 6 United States Capitol attack.

The case, which reached the U.S. Supreme Court as Trump v. Anderson, resulted in a unanimous decision that states lack the authority to disqualify federal candidates under the Fourteenth Amendment. The ruling highlighted Colorado's role in testing constitutional boundaries and demonstrated the state's willingness to engage in significant national political disputes. The case also sparked intense debate within Colorado about the proper role of state courts in federal election matters.

=== 2024 congressional special election ===
In March 2024, Representative Ken Buck's resignation in the 4th Congressional District triggered a special election to fill the vacancy, the first time since 1983 such an election was held in the state.

Rather than using primary elections, candidates were chosen through party committees - with a 111-member Republican committee and a Democratic convention selecting their respective nominees.

Following the selection of Trisha Calvarese as the Democratic nominee for the June 25 special election, a legal challenge was filed questioning her eligibility in an attempt to block her nomination. The lawsuit, filed by a Democrat from Castle Rock against Secretary of State Jena Griswold, alleged that Calvarese was ineligible under state law 1-4-402, which requires party candidates to be affiliated with their party for twelve consecutive months prior to nomination. Calvarese, who was a native of the district but previously had been registered in Pennsylvania, registered as a Democrat in Colorado in December 2023, less than four months before her nomination.

The Colorado Democratic Party defended Calvarese's nomination, arguing that while state law appeared to impose a residency requirement, only the U.S. Constitution's requirements for congressional candidates were relevant. Party Chair Shad Murib stated that party rules only required candidates to be Democrats for 12 months before the convention, which Calvarese claimed she met through her previous Democratic registration in Pennsylvania.

The election, held on June 25, 2024, demonstrated the district's strong Republican lean, with Republican nominee Greg Lopez winning 57% of the vote compared to Democratic nominee Trisha Calvarese's 36%. Two minor-party candidates, Libertarian Hannah Goodman and Approval Voting Party nominee Frank Atwood, also appeared on the ballot. Lopez, who described himself as a "placeholder" candidate, indicated he would only serve for the remainder of Buck's term, which expires in January 2025, and would not run in the primary election for the subsequent term.

In a simultaneous Democratic primary, Calvarese defeated Ike McCorkle and John Padora to secure the nomination for the November general election. Lauren Boebert, who had moved from CD3, secured the Republican nomination with 43% of the vote against a field of 5 opponents, including former state senator Jerry Sonnenberg who finished second with 14.3% and controversial conservative radio host Deborah Flora who placed third with 13.8%.

== Federal representation ==
The state is represented in the United States Senate by Democrats John Hickenlooper and Michael Bennet serving since 2021 and 2010, respectively.

=== 118th Congress ===
Colorado has eight seats in the United States House of Representatives since the 2020 reapportionment. Currently, five seats are held by Democrats and three by Republicans. The state's congressional delegation includes:

- Colorado's 1st congressional district - Democrat Diana DeGette (Denver area)
- Colorado's 2nd congressional district - Democrat Joe Neguse (Boulder area)
- Colorado's 3rd congressional district - Republican Jeff Hurd (Western Slope)
- Colorado's 4th congressional district - Republican Lauren Boebert (Eastern Plains)
- Colorado's 5th congressional district - Republican Jeff Crank (Colorado Springs)
- Colorado's 6th congressional district - Democrat Jason Crow (Aurora)
- Colorado's 7th congressional district - Democrat Brittany Pettersen (Jefferson County)
- Colorado's 8th congressional district - Republican Gabe Evans (North Denver suburbs)

=== 119th Congress ===
In the 2024 general election, Lauren Boebert defeated Democrat Trisha Calvarese in the 4th congressional district, having moved from CD3 to run in the new district.

In Boebert's former district, Republican Jeff Hurd defeated Democrat Adam Frisch to win the open seat. Frisch, who had narrowly lost to Boebert in 2022 by just 546 votes, conceded the race on November 6. Hurd, a Grand Junction attorney and small business owner, had won the Republican primary with 41% of the vote and campaigned on creating economic opportunities in rural Colorado.

In a close race, Democrat Yadira Caraveo lost her seat in the 8th congressional district to Republican challenger Gabe Evans. With over 95% of votes counted, Evans received 162,022 votes (49%) to Caraveo's 159,426 (48.2%), a margin of fewer than 2,600 votes. Approval Voting Party candidate Chris Baum received 5,699 votes (1.7%) and Unity Party candidate Susan Hall received 3,645 votes (1.1%). Caraveo conceded the race on November 10, thanking her supporters and pledging to continue serving through the end of her term.

These shifts brought the Democratic majority in the state's congressional delegation to an end for the first time since 2018. However, Colorado largely bucked the national Republican wave in 2024, with Democratic Vice President Kamala Harris winning the state with 54.4% of the vote compared to Trump's 43.1%. Analysts attributed Colorado's Democratic resilience to several factors, including its highly educated and urbanized population, low religiosity, and voters being less singularly focused on inflation compared to other states. While the state saw some rightward movement among Latino voters following national trends, this was offset by Democratic gains among white voters. The state's demographic makeup and focus on issues beyond just the economy helped maintain its overall Democratic lean despite Republican gains in congressional races.

== Political dynamics ==
=== Regional differences ===
Colorado's political geography shows distinct regional patterns. Democratic strength is concentrated in:

- The City of Denver and its nearby suburbs
- Boulder County
- Fort Collins
- Parts of the I-70 corridor
- The San Luis Valley
- Mountain resort communities (Pitkin, Eagle, La Plata, Routt)

Republican strength is found in:

- The eastern plains (the most Republican part of the state)
- El Paso County (Colorado Springs)
- Douglas County
- The Western Slope near Grand Junction
- High mountain communities in the center of the state

Denver's suburban counties, including Adams, Arapahoe, Jefferson, Broomfield, and Larimer, have increasingly trended Democratic in recent elections.

=== Urban-rural divide ===
Denver, designated as Colorado's territorial capital in 1867, was formally established as the state capital when Colorado achieved statehood in 1876. The capital's location was contentious in the state's early years, with several other cities, including Colorado Springs, Golden, Boulder and Georgetown vying for the designation. The matter was settled by a statewide referendum in 1881 that confirmed Denver as the permanent capital.

Denver's role as the state capital significantly influenced Colorado's political development. The city's rapid growth in the late 19th century, driven by mining, railroad expansion, and its position as a governmental center, established it as the state's primary political hub. This centralization of political power sometimes created tensions between Denver and rural areas, particularly during debates over water rights and resource allocation.

The capital's political influence grew substantially during the 20th century as Denver's metropolitan area expanded. By the early 21st century, the Denver metropolitan area contained nearly half of Colorado's population, making it increasingly decisive in statewide elections and policymaking.

This urban-rural divide is particularly evident in water politics, which has been a defining issue in Colorado's political landscape since its founding. The state's water rights are governed by the prior appropriation doctrine ("first in time, first in right"), which has created ongoing tensions between urban and agricultural users, especially as urbanization in the Denver suburbs has increased demand for water.

=== Water politics and interstate relations ===
Colorado's position as a headwater state for several major river systems, including the Colorado River, Arkansas River, and South Platte River, makes it central to interstate water politics. The state is party to nine interstate water compacts, which legally bind Colorado to deliver specific amounts of water to downstream states.

The Colorado River Compact of 1922, perhaps the most significant of these agreements, requires upper basin states (Colorado, Wyoming, Utah, and New Mexico) to deliver 7.5 million acre-feet of water annually to lower basin states (California, Arizona, and Nevada). As climate change reduces water availability and urban growth increases demand, this requirement has become increasingly contentious, leading to complex political negotiations and occasional legal disputes between states.

The agricultural communities of Colorado's eastern plains, particularly farmers and ranchers, have been significantly impacted by water rights issues and aquifer depletion. These stakeholders often find themselves competing not only with urban water demands from the Front Range, but also with neighboring states' water usage patterns.

A major concern is the depletion of the Ogallala Aquifer, which extends beneath eastern Colorado and several neighboring states, including Nebraska. While Colorado has implemented various conservation measures and strict well-permitting processes, Nebraska's less restrictive policies regarding aquifer usage have led to tensions between the two states. In 2022, Nebraska proposed building a $500 million canal and reservoir system to divert water from the South Platte River in Colorado, citing a 1923 water compact between the states. This escalated tensions over water rights, with Nebraska claiming the project was necessary to protect its agricultural interests while Colorado officials expressed concerns about the impact on their state's water supply. The dispute highlighted the growing pressures on water resources in both states, as Nebraska's agricultural sector continues to draw heavily from the aquifer, with withdrawal rates often exceeding natural recharge rates. This has resulted in declining water tables that affect Colorado farmers near the state border, where the aquifer's depletion is particularly evident.

The situation exemplifies the complex interplay between state water rights, agricultural sustainability, and interstate water management. Colorado farmers and ranchers in the region have had to adapt through various means, including implementing more efficient irrigation systems, shifting to less water-intensive crops, and in some cases, reducing cultivated acreage.

=== Voter demographics ===
As of 2022, unaffiliated voters comprise over 40% of Colorado's electorate, with these voters typically favoring Democratic candidates in recent elections. The state's growing population of young, college-educated, and suburban voters has contributed to its Democratic shift.

== See also ==
- Elections in Colorado
- Government of Colorado
- Political party strength in Colorado
