= 1924 United States presidential election in Colorado =

1924 United States presidential election

- November 4, 1924

Nominee	Calvin Coolidge	John W. Davis	Robert M. La Follette
Party	Republican	Democratic	La Follette–Wheeler Independent
Alliance			Farmer–Labor
Home state	Massachusetts	West Virginia	Wisconsin
Running mate	Charles G. Dawes	Charles W. Bryan	Burton K. Wheeler
Electoral vote	6	0	0
Popular vote	195,171	75,238	69,945
Percentage	57.02%	21.98%	20.44%
County results
Coolidge
30–40%
40–50%
50–60%
60–70%
Davis
30–40%
La Follette
40–50%
President before election
Calvin Coolidge
Republican
Elected President
Calvin Coolidge
Republican

The 1924 United States presidential election in Colorado took place on November 4, 1924, as part of the 1924 United States presidential election which was held throughout all contemporary forty-eight states. Voters chose six representatives, or electors to the Electoral College, who voted for president and vice president.

Between 1896 and 1916, Colorado had been strongly Democratic-leaning due to that party's adoption of free silver in this silver-mining state; however, in 1920 Warren G. Harding carried every county in the state. In the following few years the Ku Klux Klan grew extremely rapidly in Colorado and by the time of the next election it was close to taking control of the state government. The Klan was aided by structural problems in Colorado's agriculture and fear of Catholicism embedded in Mexican immigration and the traditional Catholicism of the Hispanic south-central counties.

As it turned out, the strong economy ensured that incumbent President Calvin Coolidge would have little trouble carrying the state, despite the strong third-party candidacy of Wisconsin Senator Robert M. La Follette, who was opposed to the powerful Klan and struggled in the anti-Catholic High Plains.

As of the 2024 presidential election this is the last occasion Costilla County has voted for a Republican presidential candidate. This was also the best margin for a Republican presidential nominee in Colorado.

== Results ==
General Election Results
Party	Pledged to	Elector	Votes
Republican Party	Calvin Coolidge	Clyde C. Dawson	195,171
Republican Party	Calvin Coolidge	H. B. Means	194,456
Republican Party	Calvin Coolidge	Mrs. E. C. Giddings	194,205
Republican Party	Calvin Coolidge	Robert G. Breckenridge	193,956
Republican Party	Calvin Coolidge	Edward C. Hanley	193,593
Republican Party	Calvin Coolidge	Mrs. Spencer Penrose	193,068
Democratic Party	John W. Davis	George H. Day	75,238
Democratic Party	John W. Davis	William C. Jones	74,778
Democratic Party	John W. Davis	Rose Lee Smith	74,547
Democratic Party	John W. Davis	Richard H. Malone	74,515
Democratic Party	John W. Davis	A. W. Scott	74,133
Democratic Party	John W. Davis	U. J. Warren	73,481
La Follette-Wheeler	Robert M. La Follette	Elmer A. Backus	57,368
La Follette-Wheeler	Robert M. La Follette	Theodora L. Hayward	57,339
La Follette-Wheeler	Robert M. La Follette	Aaron P. R. Drucker	57,173
La Follette-Wheeler	Robert M. La Follette	Henrietta B. Lindsey	57,084
La Follette-Wheeler	Robert M. La Follette	Earl Hoage	56,860
La Follette-Wheeler	Robert M. La Follette	Owen E. Webb	56,424
Farmer-Labor Party	Robert M. La Follette	Hattie K. Howard	12,577
Farmer-Labor Party	Robert M. La Follette	Frances M. Cale	12,535
Farmer-Labor Party	Robert M. La Follette	John A. H. Hopkins, Jr.	12,457
Farmer-Labor Party	Robert M. La Follette	Vance Monroe	12,320
Farmer-Labor Party	Robert M. La Follette	Lee Burton Ruckman	12,282
Farmer-Labor Party	Robert M. La Follette	E. I. Raymond	12,260
Prohibition Party	Herman P. Faris	Henry Candlin	966
Prohibition Party	Herman P. Faris	J. H. Dodds	940
Prohibition Party	Herman P. Faris	Edgar Wilkinson	913
Prohibition Party	Herman P. Faris	Fannie E. Faris	911
Prohibition Party	Herman P. Faris	James Renwick Wylie	860
Prohibition Party	Herman P. Faris	Alonzo Spicer	841
Workers Party	William Z. Foster	James Albert Ayres	562
Workers Party	William Z. Foster	Nelson Dewey	509
Workers Party	William Z. Foster	William Dietrich	461
Workers Party	William Z. Foster	Leonard Forschler	413
Workers Party	William Z. Foster	Wilbert Hutton	408
Workers Party	William Z. Foster	Orlo McSwain	378
Socialist Labor Party	Frank T. Johns	J. V. Smith	378
Socialist Labor Party	Frank T. Johns	Ludwig Ginther	313
Socialist Labor Party	Frank T. Johns	Andrew Ohman	282
Socialist Labor Party	Frank T. Johns	A. T. Ljungberg	278
Votes cast (Note: Based on totals for highest elector on each ticket)			342,260

=== Results by county ===
County	John Calvin Coolidge Republican		John William Davis Democratic		Robert M. La Follette LaFollette-Wheeler Farmer-Labor		Herman Preston Faris Prohibition		William Z. Foster Workers		Frank Tetes Johns Socialist Labor		Margin	
County	%	#	%	#	%	#	%	#	%	#	%	#	%	#
Morgan	69.99%	3,321	15.95%	757	13.40%	636	0.38%	18	0.11%	5	0.17%	8	54.04%	2,564
Jackson	67.35%	394	18.97%	111	12.82%	75	0.17%	1	0.00%	0	0.68%	4	48.38%	283
Larimer	66.65%	6,538	20.08%	1,970	12.46%	1,222	0.45%	44	0.17%	17	0.18%	18	46.57%	4,568
Arapahoe	64.23%	4,267	18.20%	1,209	17.18%	1,141	0.21%	14	0.11%	7	0.08%	5	46.03%	3,058
Jefferson	63.69%	4,869	16.63%	1,271	19.42%	1,485	0.09%	7	0.10%	8	0.07%	5	44.26% (Note: In this county where Davis ran third behind La Follette, percentage margin given is Coolidge percentage minus La Follette percentage and vote margin Coolidge vote total minus La Follette vote total.)	3,384
Denver	63.44%	59,077	16.93%	15,764	19.20%	17,876	0.15%	136	0.20%	190	0.09%	80	44.24%	41,201
Weld	62.68%	10,185	20.96%	3,406	15.78%	2,565	0.31%	51	0.09%	14	0.18%	29	41.72%	6,779
Fremont	61.13%	4,433	21.37%	1,550	16.95%	1,229	0.32%	23	0.08%	6	0.15%	11	39.75%	2,883
Kit Carson	60.21%	2,108	20.57%	720	18.42%	645	0.51%	18	0.06%	2	0.23%	8	39.65%	1,388
Clear Creek	61.87%	722	24.34%	284	13.45%	157	0.09%	1	0.17%	2	0.09%	1	37.53%	438
Prowers	59.21%	2,564	24.06%	1,042	15.80%	684	0.67%	29	0.09%	4	0.16%	7	35.15%	1,522
Otero	59.19%	4,694	24.44%	1,938	15.46%	1,226	0.69%	55	0.10%	8	0.11%	9	34.75%	2,756
Yuma	57.91%	2,789	17.96%	865	23.63%	1,138	0.46%	22	0.00%	0	0.04%	2	34.28%	1,651
Boulder	58.75%	7,595	25.32%	3,273	15.53%	2,007	0.21%	27	0.10%	13	0.09%	12	33.43%	4,322
El Paso	55.69%	10,215	22.57%	4,140	21.19%	3,887	0.39%	71	0.08%	14	0.09%	17	33.12%	6,075
Adams	56.33%	2,931	23.24%	1,209	19.72%	1,026	0.35%	18	0.25%	13	0.12%	6	33.10%	1,722
Douglas	55.34%	870	24.36%	383	19.91%	313	0.13%	2	0.06%	1	0.19%	3	30.98%	487
Lincoln	54.70%	1,642	21.12%	634	23.78%	714	0.20%	6	0.03%	1	0.17%	5	30.91%	928
Gilpin	54.78%	361	24.43%	161	20.49%	135	0.15%	1	0.00%	0	0.15%	1	30.35%	200
Elbert	54.97%	1,428	19.48%	506	24.75%	643	0.65%	17	0.04%	1	0.12%	3	30.22%	785
Washington	54.27%	1,851	21.11%	720	24.10%	822	0.41%	14	0.03%	1	0.09%	3	30.17%	1,029
Grand	54.31%	681	24.56%	308	20.97%	263	0.08%	1	0.08%	1	0.00%	0	29.74%	373
Saguache	58.33%	1,205	28.61%	591	12.44%	257	0.29%	6	0.05%	1	0.29%	6	29.72%	614
Park	56.12%	660	26.87%	316	15.05%	177	1.53%	18	0.17%	2	0.26%	3	29.25%	344
Logan	55.60%	3,103	16.95%	946	26.59%	1,484	0.34%	19	0.30%	17	0.22%	12	29.01%	1,619
Rio Blanco	60.84%	766	32.33%	407	6.27%	79	0.40%	5	0.00%	0	0.16%	2	28.51%	359
Pueblo	52.86%	10,577	24.57%	4,917	22.02%	4,406	0.11%	23	0.33%	66	0.10%	20	28.29%	5,660
Delta	54.36%	2,752	26.57%	1,345	18.31%	927	0.47%	24	0.22%	11	0.08%	4	27.79%	1,407
Sedgwick	51.97%	779	24.82%	372	22.48%	337	0.47%	7	0.00%	0	0.27%	4	27.15%	407
Cheyenne	55.70%	875	15.02%	236	28.64%	450	0.38%	6	0.19%	3	0.06%	1	27.05%	425
Garfield	51.27%	1,934	24.31%	917	23.78%	897	0.27%	10	0.21%	8	0.16%	6	26.96%	1,017
Bent	54.14%	1,511	28.81%	804	16.55%	462	0.36%	10	0.14%	4	0.00%	0	25.33%	707
Rio Grande	53.51%	1,572	31.38%	922	14.19%	417	0.68%	20	0.20%	6	0.03%	1	22.12%	650
Las Animas	48.68%	5,698	23.56%	2,758	27.28%	3,193	0.34%	40	0.07%	8	0.08%	9	21.40%	2,505
Hinsdale	50.00%	138	28.62%	79	20.65%	57	0.36%	1	0.00%	0	0.36%	1	21.38%	59
Routt	53.51%	1,822	32.78%	1,116	13.19%	449	0.21%	7	0.09%	3	0.23%	8	20.73%	706
Teller	48.78%	1,283	22.51%	592	28.10%	739	0.11%	3	0.27%	7	0.23%	6	20.68%	544
Kiowa	47.49%	805	25.43%	431	26.90%	456	0.12%	2	0.06%	1	0.00%	0	20.59%	349
Baca	46.35%	1,174	25.78%	653	25.82%	654	1.11%	28	0.87%	22	0.08%	2	20.53%	520
Huerfano	49.08%	2,784	21.49%	1,219	29.00%	1,645	0.12%	7	0.23%	13	0.07%	4	20.08%	1,139
Crowley	50.23%	1,087	30.82%	667	18.35%	397	0.28%	6	0.28%	6	0.05%	1	19.41%	420
Montrose	45.82%	2,077	27.33%	1,239	26.16%	1,186	0.31%	14	0.18%	8	0.20%	9	18.49%	838
Mesa	45.53%	4,053	26.83%	2,388	27.21%	2,422	0.34%	30	0.03%	3	0.07%	6	18.32%	1,631
Conejos	56.17%	1,475	37.89%	995	5.79%	152	0.15%	4	0.00%	0	0.00%	0	18.28%	480
Moffat	50.70%	1,009	32.51%	647	16.58%	330	0.10%	2	0.00%	0	0.10%	2	18.19%	362
Phillips	49.61%	1,076	18.30%	397	31.72%	688	0.28%	6	0.05%	1	0.05%	1	17.89%	388
Pitkin	47.27%	442	21.82%	204	30.59%	286	0.21%	2	0.00%	0	0.11%	1	16.68%	156
Eagle	44.43%	722	26.52%	431	28.25%	459	0.31%	5	0.12%	2	0.37%	6	16.18%	263
Custer	44.41%	429	29.09%	281	25.47%	246	0.72%	7	0.10%	1	0.21%	2	15.32%	148
Summit	47.52%	354	32.35%	241	19.33%	144	0.40%	3	0.27%	2	0.13%	1	15.17%	113
Mineral	46.01%	150	30.98%	101	22.39%	73	0.31%	1	0.00%	0	0.31%	1	15.03%	49
Gunnison	44.70%	1,122	23.82%	598	31.04%	779	0.16%	4	0.08%	2	0.20%	5	13.67%	343
Lake	43.00%	1,005	26.23%	613	29.65%	693	0.51%	12	0.47%	11	0.13%	3	13.35%	312
Archuleta	43.12%	451	25.72%	269	30.21%	316	0.29%	3	0.57%	6	0.10%	1	12.91%	135
Ouray	44.28%	484	23.42%	256	31.56%	345	0.18%	2	0.55%	6	0.00%	0	12.72%	139
Chaffee	43.40%	1,336	19.88%	612	36.26%	1,116	0.19%	6	0.19%	6	0.06%	2	7.15%	220
San Miguel	43.62%	677	36.53%	567	18.56%	288	0.00%	0	1.03%	16	0.26%	4	7.09%	110
Alamosa	40.59%	1,009	25.14%	625	33.83%	841	0.24%	6	0.16%	4	0.04%	1	6.76%	168
Costilla	48.37%	755	42.60%	665	8.14%	127	0.64%	10	0.13%	2	0.13%	2	5.77%	90
San Juan	39.78%	218	37.59%	206	22.63%	124	0.00%	0	0.00%	0	0.00%	0	2.19%	12
Montezuma	34.58%	703	35.46%	721	29.27%	595	0.49%	10	0.15%	3	0.05%	1	-0.89%	-18
La Plata	35.13%	1,469	36.25%	1,516	28.10%	1,175	0.41%	17	0.05%	2	0.07%	3	-1.12%	-47
Dolores	21.30%	95	35.20%	157	42.38%	189	0.90%	4	0.22%	1	0.00%	0	-7.17% (Note: In this county where Coolidge ran third behind both La Follette and Davis, percentage margin given is Davis percentage minus La Follette percentage and vote margin Davis vote total minus La Follette vote total.)	-32

== See also ==
- United States presidential elections in Colorado
