= 1880 United States presidential election in Colorado =

- November 2, 1880
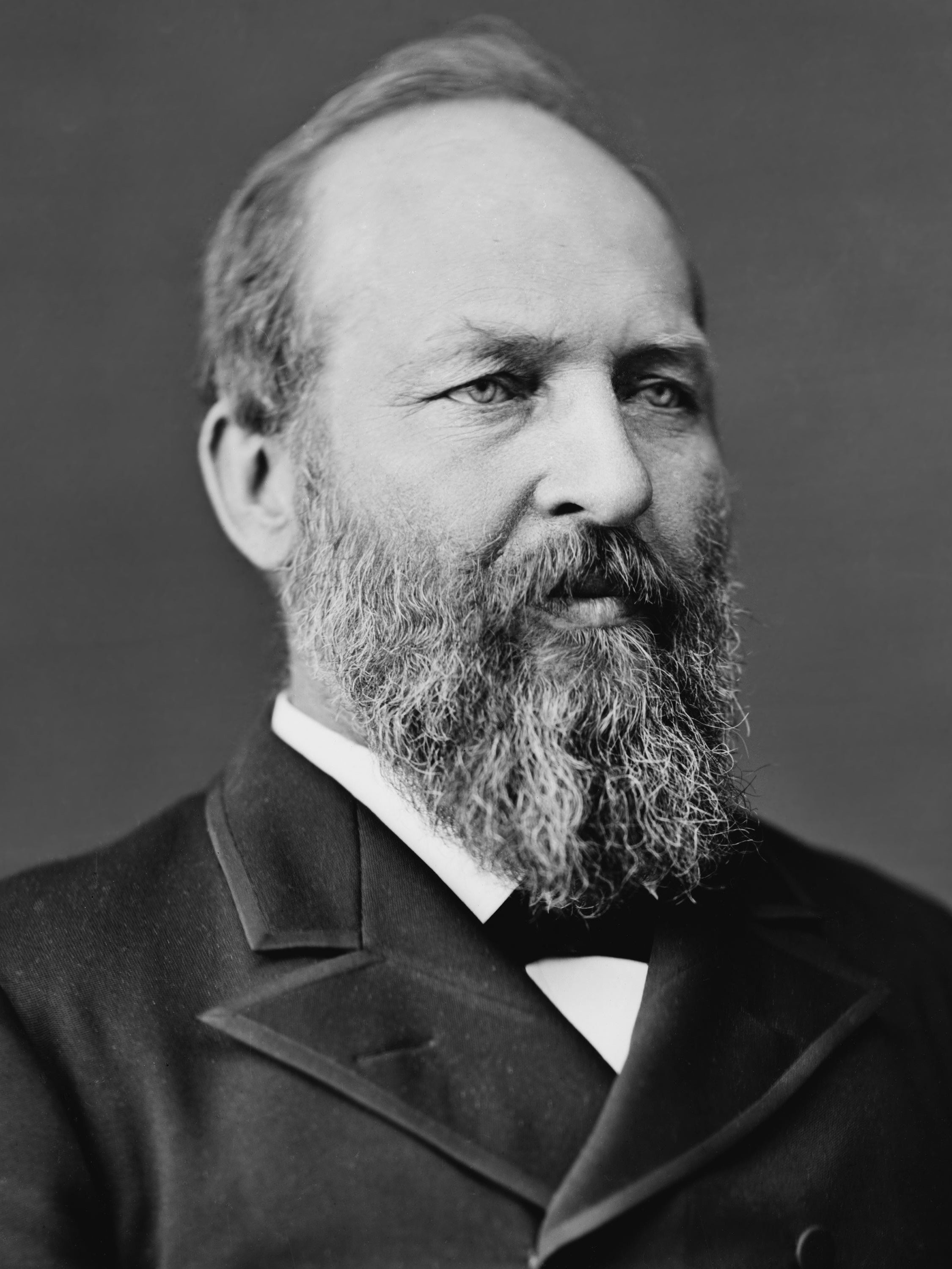

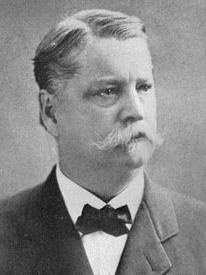
Nominee	James A. Garfield	Winfield Scott Hancock
Party	Republican	Democratic
Home state	Ohio	Pennsylvania
Running mate	Chester A. Arthur	William Hayden English
Electoral vote	3	0
Popular vote	27,450	24,647
Percentage	51.26%	46.03%
County results
Garfield
40–50%
50–60%
60–70%
Hancock
50–60%
60–70%
President before election
Rutherford B. Hayes
Republican
Elected President
James A. Garfield
Republican

The 1880 United States presidential election in Colorado took place on November 2, 1880, as part of the 1880 United States presidential election. Voters chose three representatives, or electors to the Electoral College, who voted for president and vice president.

Colorado voted for the Republican nominee, James A. Garfield, over the Democratic nominee, Winfield Scott Hancock. Garfield won the state by a margin of 5.23 points. Before Populist candidate James B. Weaver's 1892 victory transitioned the state into being Democratic-leaning, this was the closest a Democrat came to winning the state. Additionally, it was the only time a Democrat won any counties other than Las Animas, Bent, and Huerfano until 1896.

Hancock's strength was part of a brief surge for Democrats in the Rocky Mountains and Pacific: Democrats captured California for the first time since 1856, Nevada for the first time ever, and fell only 1.63% short in Oregon. This surge can largely be attributed to a letter attributed to Garfield, first printed in a New York newspaper named Truth, that declared Garfield was in favor of allowing Chinese immigration for its cheap labor. Despite the fact that it was a blatant falsehood, it cost Republicans in the west where Chinese immigrants were often accused of stealing jobs from American laborers.

== Results ==
1880 United States presidential election in Colorado
Party	Candidate	Running mate	Popular vote		Electoral vote	
Party	Candidate	Running mate	Count	%	Count	%
Republican	James Abram Garfield of Ohio	Chester Alan Arthur of New York	27,450	51.26%	3	100.00%
Democratic	Winfield Scott Hancock of Pennsylvania	William Hayden English of Indiana	24,647	46.03%	0	0.00%
Greenback	James Baird Weaver of Iowa	Barzillai Jefferson Chambers of Texas	1,435	2.68%	0	0.00%
N/A	Others	Others	14	0.03%	0	0.00%
Total			53,546	100.00%	3	100.00%

=== Results by county ===
County	James Abram Garfield Republican		Winfield Scott Hancock Democratic		James Baird Weaver Greenback		Various candidates Other parties		Margin	
County	%	#	%	#	%	#	%	#	%	#
Routt	67.24%	39	32.76%	19	0.00%	0			34.48%	20
El Paso	65.36%	1,151	32.94%	580	1.70%	30			32.42%	571
Weld	56.26%	804	26.10%	373	17.56%	251	0.07%	1	30.16%	431
Clear Creek	60.02%	1,567	36.81%	961	3.18%	83			23.21%	606
Boulder	54.66%	1,313	33.14%	796	12.20%	293			21.52%	517
Larimer	53.26%	646	31.99%	388	14.67%	178	0.08%	1	21.27%	258
Gilpin	59.74%	1,236	38.91%	805	1.26%	26	0.10%	2	20.83%	431
Rio Grande	60.08%	298	39.92%	198	0.00%	0			20.16%	100
Grand	57.08%	121	41.04%	87	1.89%	4			16.04%	34
Saguache	57.19%	509	41.69%	371	0.45%	4	0.67%	6	15.51%	138
Custer	54.18%	1,297	44.32%	1,061	1.50%	36			9.86%	236
Arapahoe	53.36%	4,214	45.35%	3,582	1.29%	102			8.00%	632
Douglas	53.82%	331	45.85%	282	0.16%	1	0.16%	1	7.97%	49
Hinsdale	53.84%	421	46.16%	361	0.00%	0			7.67%	60
Park	52.60%	698	45.06%	598	2.34%	31			7.54%	100
Ouray	53.05%	479	46.29%	418	0.66%	6			6.76%	61
San Juan	52.71%	224	46.12%	196	1.18%	5			6.59%	28
Fremont	50.33%	606	44.02%	530	5.40%	65	0.25%	3	6.31%	76
Jefferson	49.55%	832	47.05%	790	3.39%	57			2.50%	42
Conejos	49.80%	608	50.04%	611	0.16%	2			-0.25%	-3
Summit	48.81%	1,289	50.28%	1,328	0.91%	24			-1.48%	-39
Pueblo	48.93%	824	51.07%	860	0.00%	0			-2.14%	-36
Chaffee	48.50%	1,135	50.77%	1,188	0.73%	17			-2.26%	-53
Gunnison	48.68%	1,012	50.99%	1,060	0.34%	7			-2.31%	-48
Lake	46.70%	3,801	51.56%	4,197	1.74%	142			-4.86%	-396
Elbert	46.68%	176	51.72%	195	1.59%	6			-5.04%	-19
Costilla	46.84%	334	53.16%	379	0.00%	0			-6.31%	-45
Huerfano	46.00%	466	52.52%	532	1.48%	15			-6.52%	-66
La Plata	42.88%	259	57.12%	345	0.00%	0			-14.24%	-86
Bent	41.23%	174	57.35%	242	1.42%	6			-16.11%	-68
Las Animas	30.14%	586	67.59%	1,314	2.26%	44			-37.45%	-728

== See also ==
- United States presidential elections in Colorado
