= United States presidential elections in Colorado =

Presidential elections in Colorado
- Number of elections: 38
- Voted Democratic: 15
- Voted Republican: 22
- Voted other: 1 (Note: James B. Weaver, 1892.)
- Voted for winning candidate: 26
- Voted for losing candidate: 12

Following is a table of United States presidential elections in Colorado, ordered by year. Since its admission to statehood in 1876, Colorado has participated in every U.S. presidential election.

Winners of the state are in bold. The shading refers to the state winner, and not the national winner.

View source data.

Year	Winner (nationally)	Votes	Percent	Runner-up (nationally)	Votes	Percent	Other national candidates (Note: For purposes of these lists, other national candidates are defined as those who won at least one electoral vote, or won at least ten percent of the vote in multiple states.)	Votes	Percent	Electoral votes	Notes
2024	Donald Trump	1,377,441	43.14	**Kamala Harris**	1,728,159	54.13	—			10	
2020	**Joe Biden**	1,804,196	55.40	Donald Trump	1,364,471	41.90	—			9	
2016	Donald Trump (Note: Won the electoral college while losing the popular vote)	1,202,484	43.25	**Hillary Clinton**	1,338,870	48.16				9	
2012	**Barack Obama**	1,323,101	51.49	Mitt Romney	1,185,243	46.13	—			9	
2008	**Barack Obama**	1,288,633	53.66	John McCain	1,073,629	44.71	—			9	
2004	**George W. Bush**	1,101,255	51.69	John Kerry	1,001,732	47.02	—			9	
2000	**George W. Bush**	883,748	50.75	Al Gore	738,227	42.39	—			8	
1996	Bill Clinton	671,152	44.43	**Bob Dole**	691,848	45.80	Ross Perot	99,629	6.59	8	
1992	**Bill Clinton**	629,681	40.13	George H. W. Bush	562,850	35.87	Ross Perot	366,010	23.32	8	
1988	**George H. W. Bush**	728,177	53.06	Michael Dukakis	621,453	45.28	—			8	
1984	**Ronald Reagan**	821,818	63.44	Walter Mondale	454,974	35.12	—			8	
1980	**Ronald Reagan**	652,264	55.07	Jimmy Carter	367,973	31.07	John B. Anderson	130,633	11.03	7	
1976	Jimmy Carter	460,353	42.58	**Gerald Ford**	584,367	54.05	—			7	
1972	**Richard Nixon**	597,189	62.61	George McGovern	329,980	34.59	—			7	
1968	**Richard Nixon**	409,345	50.46	Hubert Humphrey	335,174	41.32	George Wallace	60,813	7.50	6	
1964	**Lyndon B. Johnson**	476,024	61.27	Barry Goldwater	296,767	38.19	—			6	
1960	John F. Kennedy	330,629	44.91	**Richard Nixon**	402,242	54.63	—			6	
1956	**Dwight D. Eisenhower**	394,479	59.49	Adlai Stevenson II	263,997	39.81	T. Coleman Andrews/ Unpledged Electors (Note: Was allied with a slate of unpledged electors in Louisiana, Mississippi and South Carolina)	759	0.11	6	
1952	**Dwight D. Eisenhower**	379,782	60.27	Adlai Stevenson II	245,504	38.96	—			6	
1948	**Harry S. Truman**	267,288	51.88	Thomas E. Dewey	239,714	46.52	Strom Thurmond	—	—	6	
1944	Franklin D. Roosevelt	234,331	46.40	**Thomas E. Dewey**	268,731	53.21	—			6	
1940	Franklin D. Roosevelt	265,554	48.37	**Wendell Willkie**	279,576	50.92	—			6	
1936	**Franklin D. Roosevelt**	295,021	60.37	Alf Landon	181,267	37.09	—			6	
1932	**Franklin D. Roosevelt**	250,877	54.81	Herbert Hoover	189,617	41.43	—			6	
1928	**Herbert Hoover**	253,872	64.72	Al Smith	133,131	33.94	—			6	
1924	**Calvin Coolidge**	195,171	57.02	John W. Davis	75,238	21.98	Robert M. La Follette	69,945	20.44	6	
1920	**Warren G. Harding**	173,248	59.32	James M. Cox	104,936	35.93	Parley P. Christensen	3,016	1.03	6	
1916	**Woodrow Wilson**	178,816	60.74	Charles E. Hughes	102,308	34.75	—			6	
1912	**Woodrow Wilson**	114,232	42.80	Theodore Roosevelt	72,306	27.09	William H. Taft	58,386	21.88	6	
1908	William H. Taft	123,693	46.88	**William Jennings Bryan**	126,644	48.00	—			5	
1904	**Theodore Roosevelt**	134,661	55.26	Alton B. Parker	100,105	41.08	—			5	
1900	William McKinley	93,072	42.04	**William Jennings Bryan**	122,733	55.43	—			4	
1896	William McKinley	26,271	13.86	**William Jennings Bryan**	161,005	84.95	—			4	
1892	Grover Cleveland	no ballots		Benjamin Harrison	38,620	41.13	**James B. Weaver**	53,584	57.07	4	
1888	**Benjamin Harrison**	50,772	55.22	Grover Cleveland	37,549	40.84	—			3	
1884	Grover Cleveland	27,723	41.68	**James G. Blaine**	36,084	54.25	—			3	
1880	**James A. Garfield**	27,450	51.26	Winfield S. Hancock	24,647	46.03	James B. Weaver	1,435	2.68	3	
1876	**Rutherford B. Hayes**	n/a	n/a	Samuel J. Tilden	n/a	n/a	—			3	Allocated by state legislature. (Note: Colorado was admitted to the union as the 38th state on August 1, 1876. With insufficient time or money to organize a presidential election in the new state, Colorado's state legislature selected the state’s electors. These electors in turn gave their three votes to Hayes and the Republican Party. This was the last election in which any state chose electors through its state legislature.)

== See also ==
- Elections in Colorado
