= 1916 United States presidential election in Colorado =

- November 7, 1916

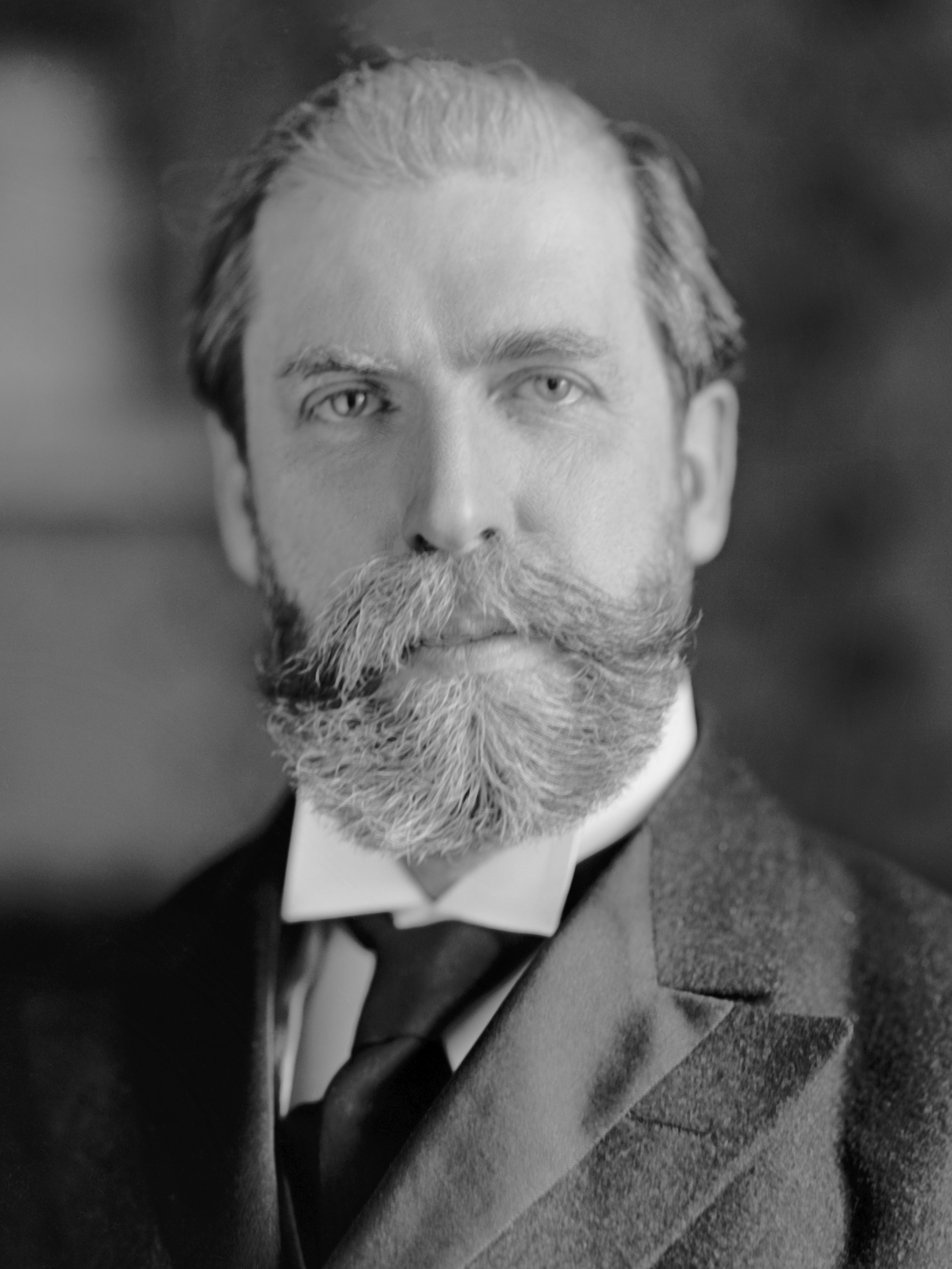
Nominee	Woodrow Wilson	Charles Evans Hughes
Party	Democratic	Republican
Home state	New Jersey	New York
Running mate	Thomas R. Marshall	Charles W. Fairbanks
Electoral vote	6	0
Popular vote	178,816	102,308
Percentage	60.74%	34.75%
County results
Wilson
50–60%
60–70%
70–80%
Hughes
40–50%
President before election
Woodrow Wilson
Democratic
Elected President
Woodrow Wilson
Democratic

The 1916 United States presidential election in Colorado took place on November 7, 1916. All contemporary forty-eight states were part of the 1916 United States presidential election. State voters chose six electors to the Electoral College, who voted for president and vice president.

Although Colorado was following statehood Republican-leaning, Populist support in silver-mining regions, was overwhelmingly transferred to William Jennings Bryan in 1896 and maintained in the following four elections, when the Republicans won only in the 1904 landslide of Theodore Roosevelt, and even then Colorado was the only western state where more than a couple of counties retained their Bryanite Democratic loyalties with Alton Parker as the nominee.

Moreover, in contrast to the East where supporters of Theodore Roosevelt's "Bull Moose" Party from the 1912 election rapidly returned to the Republicans, in the Mountain States many if not most of these supporters turned to the Democratic Party not only in presidential elections, but also in state and federal legislative ones. Another factor helping Wilson was a powerful "peace vote" in the Western states due to opposition to participation in World War I, and a third was that a considerable part of the substantial vote for Eugene Debs from the previous election was turned over to Woodrow Wilson owing to such Progressive reforms as the Sixteenth and Seventeenth Amendments.

These factors combined to give Wilson a powerful victory over Republican nominee Charles Evans Hughes. Wilson won by 25.99 percentage points and carried every county except Sedgwick (albeit losing by ten votes), the furthest northeast, which had also been one of two counties to back Roosevelt four years earlier. This is the second-best Democratic margin in Colorado presidential election history behind Bryan's five-to-one win in the “free silver” 1896 election, although Lyndon B. Johnson would exceed Wilson's vote share in 1964.

== Results ==
General Election Results
Party	Pledged to	Elector	Votes
Democratic Party	Woodrow Wilson	Thomas E. Munson	178,816
Democratic Party	Woodrow Wilson	John C. Bell	177,496
Democratic Party	Woodrow Wilson	Peter Krier	177,149
Democratic Party	Woodrow Wilson	Sarah K. Walling	177,110
Democratic Party	Woodrow Wilson	William E. Sweet	176,867
Democratic Party	Woodrow Wilson	Charles H. S. Whipple	176,301
Republican Party	Charles Evans Hughes	C. W. Crews	102,308
Republican Party	Charles Evans Hughes	Charles Boettcher	101,388
Republican Party	Charles Evans Hughes	David R. C. Brown	101,346
Republican Party	Charles Evans Hughes	Lawrence C. Phipps	101,333
Republican Party	Charles Evans Hughes	William F. Slocum	101,250
Republican Party	Charles Evans Hughes	Bruce G. Eaton	101,171
Socialist Party	Allan L. Benson	Abraham Marians	10,049
Socialist Party	Allan L. Benson	Charles Rush	9,970
Socialist Party	Allan L. Benson	May Charette	9,951
Socialist Party	Allan L. Benson	Mary L. Geffs	9,942
Socialist Party	Allan L. Benson	Charles E. Morrisson	9,933
Socialist Party	Allan L. Benson	Garnett Underhill	9,933
Prohibition Party	Frank Hanly	J. A. Cochran	2,793
Prohibition Party	Frank Hanly	Otto A. Reinhardt	2,763
Prohibition Party	Frank Hanly	S. H. Pollock	2,724
Prohibition Party	Frank Hanly	Edgar Wilkinson	2,723
Prohibition Party	Frank Hanly	Fred White	2,711
Prohibition Party	Frank Hanly	P. A. Rice	2,669
Progressive Party	Unpledged	Ruth De Long Avery	409
Progressive Party	Unpledged	D. C. Burns	352
Progressive Party	Unpledged	Hattie K. Howard	307
Progressive Party	Unpledged	James H. Causey	284
Progressive Party	Unpledged	Robert Kerr	259
Progressive Party	Unpledged	L. G. Kurtz	228
Votes cast (Note: Based on totals for highest elector on each ticket)			294,375

=== Results by county ===
County	Thomas Woodrow Wilson Democratic		Charles Evans Hughes Republican		Allan Louis Benson Socialist		James Franklin Hanly Prohibition		No Candidate Progressive "Bull Moose"		Margin	
County	%	#	%	#	%	#	%	#	%	#	%	#
Dolores	76.76%	251	14.07%	46	9.17%	30	0.00%	0	0.00%	0	62.69%	205
Montezuma	74.09%	1,458	21.60%	425	3.86%	76	0.46%	9	0.00%	0	52.49%	1,033
Pitkin	71.32%	915	20.50%	263	7.79%	100	0.23%	3	0.16%	2	50.82%	652
San Juan	70.00%	693	21.62%	214	7.47%	74	0.71%	7	0.20%	2	48.38%	479
Chaffee	72.47%	2,546	24.59%	864	2.22%	78	0.60%	21	0.11%	4	47.88%	1,682
Eagle	72.08%	1,136	25.19%	397	2.28%	36	0.44%	7	0.00%	0	46.89%	739
Clear Creek	71.65%	1,289	26.35%	474	1.78%	32	0.06%	1	0.17%	3	45.30%	815
Summit	70.29%	717	26.27%	268	2.75%	28	0.69%	7	0.00%	0	44.02%	449
Alamosa	70.10%	1,308	26.15%	488	3.43%	64	0.21%	4	0.11%	2	43.94%	820
Lake	68.51%	2,672	25.46%	993	0.97%	38	4.87%	190	0.18%	7	43.05%	1,679
La Plata	68.14%	2,590	27.07%	1,029	4.16%	158	0.55%	21	0.08%	3	41.07%	1,561
Ouray	67.63%	961	28.08%	399	3.94%	56	0.21%	3	0.14%	2	39.55%	562
Routt	66.80%	1,972	28.76%	849	3.86%	114	0.54%	16	0.03%	1	38.04%	1,123
San Miguel	66.78%	1,325	29.13%	578	3.58%	71	0.35%	7	0.15%	3	37.65%	747
Gunnison	65.19%	1,618	29.65%	736	4.63%	115	0.44%	11	0.08%	2	35.54%	882
Garfield	64.98%	2,479	29.86%	1,139	4.22%	161	0.94%	36	0.00%	0	35.12%	1,340
Jackson	66.60%	331	31.59%	157	1.01%	5	0.80%	4	0.00%	0	35.01%	174
Teller	64.37%	3,515	31.00%	1,693	4.23%	231	0.31%	17	0.09%	5	33.36%	1,822
Rio Grande	64.63%	1,756	32.61%	886	1.73%	47	0.96%	26	0.07%	2	32.02%	870
Mineral	60.04%	278	29.16%	135	10.37%	48	0.43%	2	0.00%	0	30.89%	143
Montrose	61.52%	2,571	31.47%	1,315	6.03%	252	0.96%	40	0.02%	1	30.06%	1,256
Gilpin	64.06%	763	34.17%	407	1.26%	15	0.42%	5	0.08%	1	29.89%	356
Conejos	64.43%	1,721	34.74%	928	0.22%	6	0.19%	5	0.41%	11	29.69%	793
Logan	63.14%	2,679	33.51%	1,422	2.62%	111	0.54%	23	0.19%	8	29.63%	1,257
Mesa	59.42%	4,394	30.06%	2,223	7.36%	544	3.12%	231	0.04%	3	29.36%	2,171
Denver	62.81%	43,029	33.84%	23,185	2.67%	1,826	0.60%	409	0.09%	63	28.96%	19,844
Saguache	63.02%	1,254	34.22%	681	2.31%	46	0.25%	5	0.20%	4	28.79%	573
Boulder	61.46%	7,419	33.02%	3,986	3.99%	482	1.35%	163	0.17%	21	28.44%	3,433
Arapahoe	62.33%	2,652	33.91%	1,443	3.03%	129	0.28%	12	0.45%	19	28.41%	1,209
Park	62.47%	674	34.48%	372	2.59%	28	0.19%	2	0.28%	3	27.99%	302
Hinsdale	58.94%	178	31.13%	94	9.60%	29	0.33%	1	0.00%	0	27.81%	84
Adams	61.74%	2,120	33.93%	1,165	3.64%	125	0.61%	21	0.09%	3	27.81%	955
Archuleta	62.64%	830	35.70%	473	0.83%	11	0.23%	3	0.60%	8	26.94%	357
Costilla	61.52%	1,028	34.65%	579	1.50%	25	0.54%	9	1.80%	30	26.87%	449
Bent	61.53%	1,473	34.80%	833	2.30%	55	1.25%	30	0.13%	3	26.73%	640
Washington	60.32%	1,748	34.13%	989	4.45%	129	1.00%	29	0.10%	3	26.19%	759
Larimer	59.49%	4,868	34.18%	2,797	5.10%	417	1.15%	94	0.09%	7	25.31%	2,071
Delta	58.97%	2,817	33.75%	1,612	5.90%	282	1.28%	61	0.10%	5	25.23%	1,205
Yuma	59.26%	2,466	34.51%	1,436	5.38%	224	0.75%	31	0.10%	4	24.75%	1,030
Grand	61.36%	624	37.17%	378	1.08%	11	0.29%	3	0.10%	1	24.19%	246
Jefferson	60.42%	3,368	36.60%	2,040	2.49%	139	0.38%	21	0.11%	6	23.82%	1,328
Pueblo	59.04%	10,710	36.08%	6,545	4.03%	731	0.76%	137	0.10%	18	22.96%	4,165
Weld	59.18%	8,600	37.12%	5,395	2.23%	324	1.43%	208	0.04%	6	22.05%	3,205
Morgan	58.46%	2,371	37.99%	1,541	2.74%	111	0.71%	29	0.10%	4	20.46%	830
Baca	54.88%	1,294	35.03%	826	8.82%	208	1.02%	24	0.25%	6	19.85%	468
Las Animas	58.58%	5,300	38.81%	3,511	1.68%	152	0.48%	43	0.45%	41	19.77%	1,789
Rio Blanco	59.19%	702	39.46%	468	1.01%	12	0.34%	4	0.00%	0	19.73%	234
Kit Carson	56.53%	1,571	37.06%	1,030	5.29%	147	1.08%	30	0.04%	1	19.47%	541
Lincoln	57.00%	1,702	37.81%	1,129	3.99%	119	1.07%	32	0.13%	4	19.19%	573
Fremont	56.92%	3,395	37.84%	2,257	4.07%	243	1.16%	69	0.02%	1	19.08%	1,138
Phillips	57.03%	795	38.16%	532	4.02%	56	0.65%	9	0.14%	2	18.87%	263
Otero	57.24%	3,963	38.68%	2,678	2.41%	167	1.50%	104	0.17%	12	18.56%	1,285
Moffat	57.41%	740	39.72%	512	2.40%	31	0.31%	4	0.16%	2	17.69%	228
Cheyenne	55.16%	802	38.38%	558	5.64%	82	0.69%	10	0.14%	2	16.78%	244
Crowley	55.42%	1,160	40.47%	847	2.44%	51	1.39%	29	0.29%	6	14.95%	313
Douglas	56.51%	820	42.18%	612	0.90%	13	0.34%	5	0.07%	1	14.33%	208
Custer	54.31%	529	41.38%	403	3.59%	35	0.51%	5	0.21%	2	12.94%	126
Huerfano	55.68%	2,632	42.88%	2,027	0.53%	25	0.66%	31	0.25%	12	12.80%	605
Elbert	53.50%	1,230	41.37%	951	3.91%	90	0.83%	19	0.39%	9	12.14%	279
Prowers	52.14%	2,168	40.48%	1,683	5.87%	244	1.47%	61	0.05%	2	11.66%	485
Kiowa	51.23%	936	39.57%	723	7.72%	141	1.15%	21	0.33%	6	11.66%	213
El Paso	50.99%	8,381	43.55%	7,159	3.36%	552	1.95%	321	0.15%	24	7.43%	1,222
Sedgwick	45.97%	519	46.86%	529	5.93%	67	0.71%	8	0.53%	6	-0.89%	-10

== See also ==
- United States presidential elections in Colorado
