= 1952 United States presidential election in Colorado =

- November 4, 1952

All 6 Colorado votes to the Electoral College

Nominee	Dwight D. Eisenhower	Adlai Stevenson
Party	Republican	Democratic
Home state	New York	Illinois
Running mate	Richard Nixon	John Sparkman
Electoral vote	6	0
Popular vote	379,782	245,504
Percentage	60.27%	38.96%
County results
Eisenhower
50–60%
60–70%
70–80%
Stevenson
40–50%
50–60%
President before election
Harry S. Truman
Democratic
Elected President
Dwight D. Eisenhower
Republican

The 1952 United States presidential election in Colorado took place on November 4, 1952, as part of the 1952 United States presidential election. State voters chose six representatives, or electors, to the Electoral College, who voted for president and vice president.

Colorado was won by Columbia University President Dwight D. Eisenhower (R–New York), running with Senator Richard Nixon, with 60.27% of the popular vote, against Adlai Stevenson (D–Illinois), running with Senator John Sparkman, with 38.96% of the popular vote.

== Results ==
1952 United States presidential election in Colorado
Party	Candidate	Votes	%
Republican	Dwight D. Eisenhower	379,782	60.27%
Democratic	Adlai Stevenson	245,504	38.96%
Constitution	Douglas MacArthur	2,181	0.35%
Progressive	Vincent Hallinan	1,919	0.30%
Socialist	Darlington Hoopes	365	0.06%
Socialist Labor	Eric Hass	352	0.06%
Total votes		630,103	100%

=== Results by county ===
County	Dwight D. Eisenhower Republican		Adlai Stevenson Democratic		Various candidates Other parties		Margin		Total votes cast
County	#	%	#	%	#	%	#	%	Total votes cast
Adams	8,995	54.89%	7,321	44.68%	71	0.43%	1,674	10.21%	16,387
Alamosa	2,728	62.13%	1,626	37.03%	37	0.84%	1,102	25.10%	4,391
Arapahoe	15,402	60.32%	9,843	38.55%	289	1.13%	5,559	21.77%	25,534
Archuleta	691	64.58%	377	35.23%	2	0.19%	314	29.35%	1,070
Baca	2,122	65.57%	1,094	33.81%	20	0.62%	1,028	31.76%	3,236
Bent	1,950	59.40%	1,317	40.12%	16	0.48%	633	19.28%	3,283
Boulder	15,069	65.29%	7,767	33.65%	243	1.06%	7,302	31.64%	23,079
Chaffee	2,171	56.70%	1,643	42.91%	15	0.39%	528	13.79%	3,829
Cheyenne	1,004	65.97%	515	33.84%	3	0.19%	489	32.13%	1,522
Clear Creek	1,145	67.71%	540	31.93%	6	0.36%	605	35.78%	1,691
Conejos	2,194	56.23%	1,610	41.26%	98	2.51%	584	14.97%	3,902
Costilla	1,070	43.73%	1,369	55.95%	8	0.32%	-299	-12.22%	2,447
Crowley	1,546	67.78%	726	31.83%	9	0.39%	820	35.95%	2,281
Custer	662	73.64%	231	25.70%	6	0.66%	431	47.94%	899
Delta	4,986	67.01%	2,389	32.11%	66	0.88%	2,597	34.90%	7,441
Denver	119,792	56.09%	92,237	43.19%	1,534	0.72%	27,555	12.90%	213,563
Dolores	542	62.23%	323	37.08%	6	0.69%	219	25.15%	871
Douglas	1,427	69.00%	637	30.80%	4	0.20%	790	38.20%	2,068
Eagle	1,242	53.70%	1,058	45.74%	13	0.56%	184	7.96%	2,313
El Paso	25,272	68.71%	11,203	30.46%	303	0.83%	14,069	38.25%	36,778
Elbert	1,579	72.56%	586	26.93%	11	0.51%	993	45.63%	2,176
Fremont	5,964	64.83%	3,176	34.53%	59	0.64%	2,788	30.30%	9,199
Garfield	3,914	68.44%	1,777	31.07%	28	0.49%	2,137	37.37%	5,719
Gilpin	357	60.41%	228	38.58%	6	1.01%	129	21.83%	591
Grand	1,333	70.34%	554	29.23%	8	0.43%	779	41.11%	1,895
Gunnison	1,533	59.46%	1,045	40.54%	0	0.00%	488	18.92%	2,578
Hinsdale	154	74.04%	54	25.96%	0	0.00%	100	48.08%	208
Huerfano	2,178	43.84%	2,773	55.82%	17	0.34%	-595	-11.98%	4,968
Jackson	579	65.35%	305	34.42%	2	0.23%	274	30.93%	886
Jefferson	19,971	63.05%	11,509	36.34%	194	0.61%	8,462	26.71%	31,674
Kiowa	1,047	70.84%	412	27.88%	19	1.28%	635	42.96%	1,478
Kit Carson	2,511	71.03%	998	28.23%	26	0.74%	1,513	42.80%	3,535
La Plata	4,425	66.03%	2,210	32.98%	66	0.99%	2,215	33.05%	6,701
Lake	1,303	44.98%	1,585	54.71%	9	0.31%	-282	-9.73%	2,897
Larimer	14,484	72.93%	5,266	26.52%	110	0.55%	9,218	46.41%	19,860
Las Animas	4,467	40.74%	6,446	58.79%	51	0.47%	-1,979	-18.05%	10,964
Lincoln	1,843	66.46%	927	33.43%	3	0.11%	916	33.03%	2,773
Logan	5,237	67.67%	2,459	31.77%	43	0.56%	2,778	35.90%	7,739
Mesa	11,883	63.06%	6,883	36.52%	79	0.42%	5,000	26.54%	18,845
Mineral	209	67.86%	98	31.82%	1	0.32%	111	36.04%	308
Moffat	1,922	70.12%	808	29.48%	11	0.40%	1,114	40.64%	2,741
Montezuma	2,466	68.01%	1,127	31.08%	33	0.91%	1,339	36.93%	3,626
Montrose	4,279	67.16%	2,037	31.97%	55	0.87%	2,242	35.19%	6,371
Morgan	5,371	69.63%	2,297	29.78%	46	0.59%	3,074	39.85%	7,714
Otero	6,552	63.57%	3,721	36.10%	34	0.33%	2,831	27.47%	10,307
Ouray	697	61.85%	413	36.65%	17	1.50%	284	25.20%	1,127
Park	775	68.89%	343	30.49%	7	0.62%	432	38.40%	1,125
Phillips	1,670	67.72%	789	32.00%	7	0.28%	881	35.72%	2,466
Pitkin	556	64.13%	309	35.64%	2	0.23%	247	28.49%	867
Prowers	3,978	65.13%	2,087	34.17%	43	0.70%	1,891	30.96%	6,108
Pueblo	20,333	48.81%	20,613	49.48%	713	1.71%	-280	-0.67%	41,659
Rio Blanco	1,612	71.42%	633	28.05%	12	0.53%	979	43.37%	2,257
Rio Grande	3,201	70.11%	1,350	29.57%	15	0.32%	1,851	40.54%	4,566
Routt	2,143	57.31%	1,575	42.12%	21	0.57%	568	15.19%	3,739
Saguache	1,344	65.08%	714	34.58%	7	0.34%	630	30.50%	2,065
San Juan	432	56.77%	327	42.97%	2	0.26%	105	13.80%	761
San Miguel	654	55.19%	524	44.22%	7	0.59%	130	10.97%	1,185
Sedgwick	1,528	68.74%	686	30.86%	9	0.40%	842	37.88%	2,223
Summit	442	61.90%	271	37.96%	1	0.14%	171	23.94%	714
Teller	1,042	63.89%	572	35.07%	17	1.04%	470	28.82%	1,631
Washington	2,398	69.65%	1,009	29.31%	36	1.04%	1,389	40.34%	3,443
Weld	18,002	66.44%	8,890	32.81%	204	0.75%	9,112	33.63%	27,096
Yuma	3,404	71.92%	1,292	27.30%	37	0.78%	2,112	44.62%	4,733
Total	379,782	60.27%	245,504	38.96%	4,817	0.77%	134,278	21.31%	630,103

==== Counties that flipped from Democratic to Republican ====
- Alamosa
- Bent
- Baca
- Clear Creek
- Cheyenne
- Conejos
- Dolores
- Delta
- Denver
- Eagle
- Gunnison
- Mesa
- Mineral
- Montezuma
- Montrose
- Pitkin
- Otero
- Routt
- Saguache
- San Juan
- San Miguel
- Summit
- Teller

== See also ==
- United States presidential elections in Colorado
