= Elections in Colorado =

Elections in Colorado are held to fill various local, state and federal positions. Special elections may be held to fill vacancies at other points in time.

In a 2020 study, Colorado was ranked 7th among the 50 states for ease of voting in presidential elections.

== Electoral system ==
Electoral precincts are drawn by the county clerk and recorder and have on average 1365 registered voters.

=== Election procedure ===
A combination of local caucuses, primaries and general elections determines the top state offices (governor, secretary of state and attorney general), as well as U.S. and state legislative races. Presidential races are decided by primary and general elections, with no caucuses. Legislation passed in 2016 instituted open primaries beginning with the 2018 races, and eliminated caucuses for presidential races starting in 2020.

=== Party system ===
A political organization is a political party when its candidate for governor receives at least 10 percent of the vote in the latest general election. Party members choose their party's nominees for the general election in a primary election. Party members also elect the county central committee members at the primary election. Colorado uses an open primary system, whereby party members and unaffiliated voters may vote in the party's primary.

There are three distinct aspects of party organization: the committee system, the designating assembly system, and the convention system. The systems operate with respect to public offices for the state, counties, US congressional districts, state senatorial districts, state representative districts, and state judicial districts. (Judicial district elections only concern the district attorney; district court and county court judges are nominated by a judicial nominating commission of the judicial district.)

- The designating assembly system designates candidates to be elected (at a primary election) as party nominees for public office. A precinct caucus is held in each precinct by each political party, where party members (who bother to show up) elect delegates to the county assembly. The county assembly chooses candidates to contest the primary election for county elected offices and elects members of the state assembly and district assemblies (congressional assemblies, judicial district assemblies, senatorial assemblies, and representative assemblies). Candidates may also be nominated by petition. The party's state assembly governs the party when it is in session.
- The major purpose of the convention system is to ultimately select delegates to the national convention. The precinct caucus also elects delegates to the county convention, and the county conventions elect delegates for the state convention and district conventions (congressional conventions, judicial district conventions, senatorial conventions, and representative conventions). The state convention elects members to the party's national committee, nominates electors to the US Electoral College, and elects delegates to the national convention.
- The committee system runs the party, while the state central committee governs the party when the party's state assembly is not in session. The precinct caucus nominates candidates for the county central committee, composed of precinct committeeman, which are elected at the primary election. The county central committee runs the party within the county, through a committee chairman who is assisted by an executive committee in larger counties. The county central committee chairman also compose the state central committee along with additional members. The district committees (for congressional districts, judicial districts, senatorial districts, and representative districts) are also composed of the county central committee chairman. The state central committees also have a state chairman and a state executive committee.

To be designated to contest the party's nomination at a primary election, a candidate must receive at least 30 percent of the delegates' votes at a party assembly. Candidates may also petition party members to contest the primary election, with at least 20 percent of the party members (of those registered within that political subdivision) for offices of or within a county, 30 percent for districts larger than a county, and 2 percent for statewide offices.

== Electoral history ==
=== Federal ===
- 2022 United States Senate election in Colorado
- 2020 United States Senate election in Colorado
- 2016 United States Senate election in Colorado
- 2014 United States Senate election in Colorado
- 2010 United States Senate election in Colorado
- 2008 United States Senate election in Colorado

=== State ===
- 2022 Colorado gubernatorial election
- 2018 Colorado gubernatorial election
- 2014 Colorado gubernatorial election
- 2010 Colorado gubernatorial election
- 2006 Colorado gubernatorial election
- 2002 Colorado gubernatorial election

== See also ==
- United States presidential elections in Colorado
- 2026 Colorado elections
- Women's suffrage in Colorado
