= 1944 United States presidential election in Colorado =

- November 7, 1944

All 6 Colorado votes to the Electoral College

Nominee	Thomas E. Dewey	Franklin D. Roosevelt
Party	Republican	Democratic
Home state	New York	New York
Running mate	John W. Bricker	Harry S. Truman
Electoral vote	6	0
Popular vote	268,731	234,331
Percentage	53.21%	46.40%
County results
Dewey
50–60%
60–70%
70–80%
Roosevelt
50–60%
60–70%
President before election
Franklin D. Roosevelt
Democratic
Elected President
Franklin D. Roosevelt
Democratic

The 1944 United States presidential election in Colorado took place on November 7, 1944, as part of the 1944 United States presidential election. State voters chose six representatives, or electors, to the Electoral College, who voted for president and vice president.

Colorado was won by Governor Thomas E. Dewey (R–New York), running with Governor John Bricker, with 53.21% of the popular vote, against incumbent President Franklin D. Roosevelt (D–New York), running with Senator Harry S. Truman, with 46.40% of the popular vote. With a victory margin of 6.8%, Colorado shifted to the right by 4.3% from 1940, when Wendell Willkie carried it by a slim margin of 2.5%.

Despite his comfortable victory, Dewey would go on to lose Colorado in 1948 to Harry S. Truman.

== Results ==
1944 United States presidential election in Colorado
Party	Candidate	Votes	%
Republican	Thomas E. Dewey	268,731	53.21%
Democratic	Franklin D. Roosevelt (inc.)	234,331	46.40%
Socialist	Norman Thomas	1,977	0.39%
Total votes		505,039	100%

=== Results by county ===
County	Thomas E. Dewey Republican		Franklin D. Roosevelt Democratic		Norman Thomas Socialist		Margin		Total
County	#	%	#	%	#	%	#	%	Total
Adams	4,933	54.43%	4,101	45.25%	29	0.32%	832	9.18%	9,063
Alamosa	1,933	51.56%	1,806	48.17%	10	0.27%	127	3.39%	3,749
Arapahoe	9,057	54.52%	7,485	45.06%	69	0.42%	1,572	9.46%	16,611
Archuleta	602	58.45%	427	41.46%	1	0.10%	175	16.99%	1,030
Baca	1,528	61.89%	941	38.11%	0	0.00%	587	23.78%	2,469
Bent	1,556	51.51%	1,456	48.20%	9	0.30%	100	3.31%	3,021
Boulder	10,054	57.09%	7,442	42.26%	114	0.65%	2,612	14.83%	17,610
Chaffee	1,675	48.83%	1,731	50.47%	24	0.70%	-56	-1.64%	3,430
Cheyenne	923	60.68%	594	39.05%	4	0.26%	329	21.63%	1,521
Clear Creek	795	55.29%	636	44.23%	7	0.49%	159	11.06%	1,438
Conejos	1,740	46.18%	2,028	53.82%	0	0.00%	-288	-7.64%	3,768
Costilla	896	37.09%	1,515	62.71%	5	0.21%	-619	-25.62%	2,416
Crowley	1,214	62.93%	710	36.81%	5	0.26%	504	26.12%	1,929
Custer	601	63.73%	333	35.31%	9	0.95%	268	28.42%	943
Delta	3,462	59.30%	2,351	40.27%	25	0.43%	1,111	19.03%	5,838
Denver	86,331	48.75%	90,001	50.82%	759	0.43%	-3,670	-2.07%	177,091
Dolores	429	58.85%	300	41.15%	0	0.00%	129	17.70%	729
Douglas	1,214	65.37%	638	34.36%	5	0.27%	576	31.01%	1,857
Eagle	922	49.07%	952	50.67%	5	0.27%	-30	-1.60%	1,879
El Paso	16,392	58.16%	11,679	41.44%	115	0.41%	4,713	16.72%	28,186
Elbert	1,413	69.13%	628	30.72%	3	0.15%	785	38.41%	2,044
Fremont	4,953	60.65%	3,180	38.94%	33	0.40%	1,773	21.71%	8,166
Garfield	2,588	57.97%	1,865	41.78%	11	0.25%	723	16.19%	4,464
Gilpin	272	55.85%	213	43.74%	2	0.41%	59	12.11%	487
Grand	968	63.52%	554	36.35%	2	0.13%	414	27.17%	1,524
Gunnison	1,221	46.30%	1,411	53.51%	5	0.19%	-190	-7.21%	2,637
Hinsdale	124	67.03%	61	32.97%	0	0.00%	63	34.06%	185
Huerfano	2,119	39.05%	3,290	60.62%	18	0.33%	-1,171	-21.57%	5,427
Jackson	463	64.76%	252	35.24%	0	0.00%	211	29.52%	715
Jefferson	9,815	57.20%	7,277	42.41%	68	0.40%	2,538	14.79%	17,160
Kiowa	970	64.75%	522	34.85%	6	0.40%	448	29.90%	1,498
Kit Carson	2,471	72.27%	937	27.41%	11	0.32%	1,534	44.86%	3,419
La Plata	3,023	59.64%	2,031	40.07%	15	0.30%	992	19.57%	5,069
Lake	1,236	42.08%	1,687	57.44%	14	0.48%	-451	-15.36%	2,937
Larimer	9,914	65.46%	5,172	34.15%	58	0.38%	4,742	31.31%	15,144
Las Animas	4,179	37.87%	6,800	61.63%	55	0.50%	-2,621	-23.76%	11,034
Lincoln	1,689	59.49%	1,147	40.40%	3	0.11%	542	19.09%	2,839
Logan	3,998	61.63%	2,471	38.09%	18	0.28%	1,527	23.54%	6,487
Mesa	6,653	48.93%	6,870	50.52%	75	0.55%	-217	-1.59%	13,598
Mineral	170	52.80%	150	46.58%	2	0.62%	20	6.22%	322
Moffat	1,445	60.87%	923	38.88%	6	0.25%	522	21.99%	2,374
Montezuma	1,610	56.99%	1,207	42.73%	8	0.28%	403	14.26%	2,825
Montrose	2,952	56.37%	2,258	43.12%	27	0.52%	694	13.25%	5,237
Morgan	4,166	69.13%	1,839	30.52%	21	0.35%	2,327	38.61%	6,026
Otero	5,002	56.74%	3,791	43.00%	23	0.26%	1,211	13.74%	8,816
Ouray	503	62.33%	303	37.55%	1	0.12%	200	24.78%	807
Park	670	60.80%	426	38.66%	6	0.54%	244	22.14%	1,102
Phillips	1,455	65.16%	761	34.08%	17	0.76%	694	31.08%	2,233
Pitkin	368	50.83%	355	49.03%	1	0.14%	13	1.80%	724
Prowers	2,796	58.71%	1,948	40.91%	18	0.38%	848	17.80%	4,762
Pueblo	13,848	41.99%	19,039	57.72%	96	0.29%	-5,191	-15.73%	32,983
Rio Blanco	881	65.89%	451	33.73%	5	0.37%	430	32.16%	1,337
Rio Grande	2,567	65.82%	1,325	33.97%	8	0.21%	1,242	31.85%	3,900
Routt	1,869	48.79%	1,940	50.64%	22	0.57%	-71	-1.85%	3,831
Saguache	1,204	62.13%	729	37.62%	5	0.26%	475	24.51%	1,938
San Juan	328	55.88%	258	43.95%	1	0.17%	70	11.93%	587
San Miguel	536	45.69%	630	53.71%	7	0.60%	-94	-8.02%	1,173
Sedgwick	1,228	68.26%	568	31.57%	3	0.17%	660	36.69%	1,799
Summit	326	57.60%	237	41.87%	3	0.53%	89	15.73%	566
Teller	829	50.24%	808	48.97%	13	0.79%	21	1.27%	1,650
Washington	2,259	67.88%	1,058	31.79%	11	0.33%	1,201	36.09%	3,328
Weld	14,546	63.01%	8,459	36.64%	81	0.35%	6,087	26.37%	23,086
Yuma	2,847	67.45%	1,374	32.55%	0	0.00%	1,473	34.90%	4,221
Totals	268,731	53.21%	234,331	46.40%	1,977	0.39%	34,400	6.81%	505,039

==== Counties that flipped from Democratic to Republican ====
- Clear Creek
- Gilpin
- Pitkin
- Ouray
- Alamosa
- Summit
- Teller
- Mineral
