= 1884 United States presidential election in Colorado =

- November 4, 1884
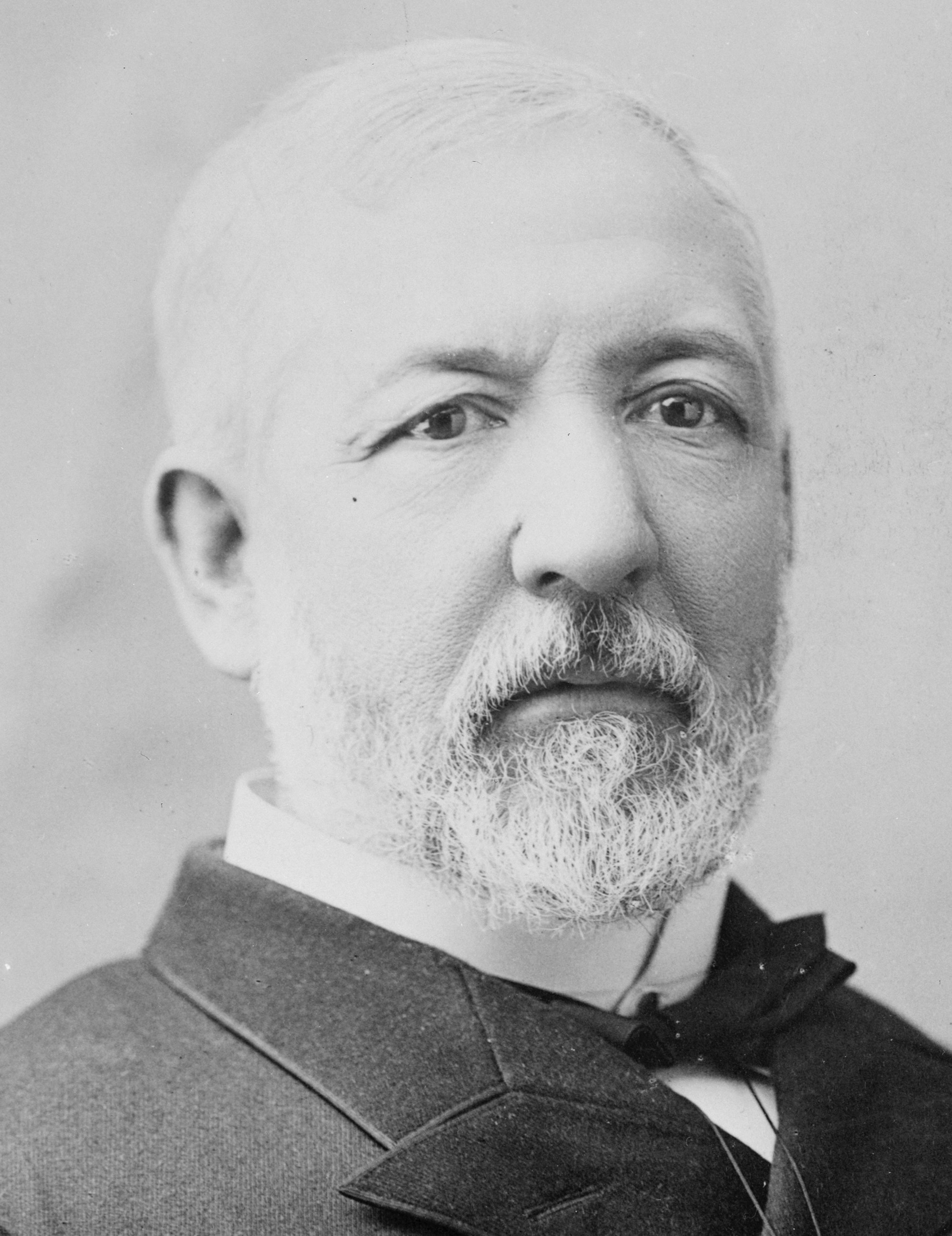

Nominee	James G. Blaine	Grover Cleveland
Party	Republican	Democratic
Home state	Maine	New York
Running mate	John A. Logan	Thomas A. Hendricks
Electoral vote	3	0
Popular vote	36,084	27,723
Percentage	54.25%	41.68%
County results
Blaine
50–60%
60–70%
Cleveland
50–60%
President before election
Chester A. Arthur
Republican
Elected President
Grover Cleveland
Democratic

The 1884 United States presidential election in Colorado took place on November 4, 1884, as part of the 1884 United States presidential election. Voters chose three representatives, or electors to the Electoral College, who voted for president and vice president.

Colorado voted for the Republican nominee, James G. Blaine, over the Democratic nominee, Grover Cleveland. Blaine won the state by a margin of 12.57 points. In its earliest years as a state Colorado was like the Plains States to its east solidly Republican, with that party continuously controlling the legislature and holding the governorship for five of seven terms. This was in spite of widespread criticism of the national GOP for its monetary policy in a state that was the major producer of silver in the United States

== Results ==
1884 United States presidential election in Colorado
Party	Candidate	Running mate	Popular vote		Electoral vote	
Party	Candidate	Running mate	Count	%	Count	%
Republican	James Gillespie Blaine of Maine	John Alexander Logan of Illinois	39,514	54.25%	3	100.00%
Democratic	Grover Cleveland of New York	Thomas Andrews Hendricks of Indiana	27,723	41.68%	0	0.00%
Greenback	Benjamin Franklin Butler of Massachusetts	Absolom Madden West of Mississippi	1,956	2.94%	0	0.00%
Prohibition	John Pierce St. John of Kansas	William Daniel of Maryland	756	1.14%	0	0.00%
Total			66,519	100.00%	3	100.00%

=== Results by county ===
County	James Gillespie Blaine Republican		Stephen Grover Cleveland Democratic		Various candidates Other parties		Margin	
County	%	#	%	#	%	#	%	#
El Paso	65.71%	1,209	29.02%	534	5.27%	97	36.68%	675
Montrose	62.69%	420	34.33%	230	2.99%	20	28.36%	190
Gilpin	61.43%	1,129	33.41%	614	5.17%	95	28.02%	515
Garfield	63.80%	245	36.20%	139	0.00%	0	27.60%	106
Eagle	61.57%	306	38.23%	190	0.20%	1	23.34%	116
Weld	53.49%	1,332	30.72%	765	15.78%	393	22.77%	567
Rio Grande	59.50%	448	38.38%	289	2.12%	16	21.12%	159
Clear Creek	59.36%	1,399	38.82%	915	1.82%	43	20.53%	484
Larimer	54.01%	1,038	33.51%	644	12.49%	240	20.50%	394
Fremont	54.77%	913	34.97%	583	10.26%	171	19.80%	330
Routt	59.22%	106	40.78%	73	0.00%	0	18.44%	33
Custer	58.67%	812	40.97%	567	0.36%	5	17.70%	245
Boulder	51.59%	1,445	34.06%	954	14.35%	402	17.53%	491
Grand	58.18%	249	40.65%	174	1.17%	5	17.52%	75
San Juan	57.24%	664	40.78%	473	1.98%	23	16.47%	191
Hinsdale	57.11%	245	41.96%	180	0.93%	4	15.15%	65
Arapahoe	54.17%	7,133	40.33%	5,310	5.51%	725	13.84%	1,823
Delta	55.96%	230	42.34%	174	1.70%	7	13.63%	56
Lake	55.52%	3,416	43.25%	2,661	1.24%	76	12.27%	755
Pitkin	55.81%	605	44.19%	479	0.00%	0	11.62%	126
Dolores	55.69%	191	44.31%	152	0.00%	0	11.37%	39
Ouray	55.57%	499	44.43%	399	0.00%	0	11.14%	100
Conejos	55.45%	728	44.40%	583	0.15%	2	11.04%	145
Park	54.45%	777	44.08%	629	1.47%	21	10.37%	148
Gunnison	54.20%	1,245	43.93%	1,009	1.87%	43	10.27%	236
Pueblo	53.88%	1,784	43.76%	1,449	2.36%	78	10.12%	335
Saguache	54.08%	543	45.22%	454	0.70%	7	8.86%	89
Elbert	54.31%	227	45.45%	190	0.24%	1	8.85%	37
San Miguel	54.19%	433	45.68%	365	0.13%	1	8.51%	68
Douglas	53.33%	288	45.56%	246	1.11%	6	7.78%	42
Chaffee	53.46%	1,142	46.16%	986	0.37%	8	7.30%	156
La Plata	51.02%	722	44.45%	629	4.52%	64	6.57%	93
Jefferson	50.97%	845	44.81%	743	4.22%	70	6.15%	102
Summit	51.92%	609	47.40%	556	0.68%	8	4.52%	53
Mesa	51.38%	353	47.89%	329	0.73%	5	3.49%	24
Costilla	50.71%	498	49.29%	484	0.00%	0	1.43%	14
Bent	44.26%	382	51.68%	446	4.06%	35	-7.42%	-64
Las Animas	41.73%	1,039	58.27%	1,451	0.00%	0	-16.55%	-412
Huerfano	37.83%	435	58.70%	675	3.48%	40	-20.87%	-240

== See also ==
- United States presidential elections in Colorado
