= 1948 United States presidential election in Colorado =

- November 2, 1948

All 6 Colorado votes to the Electoral College

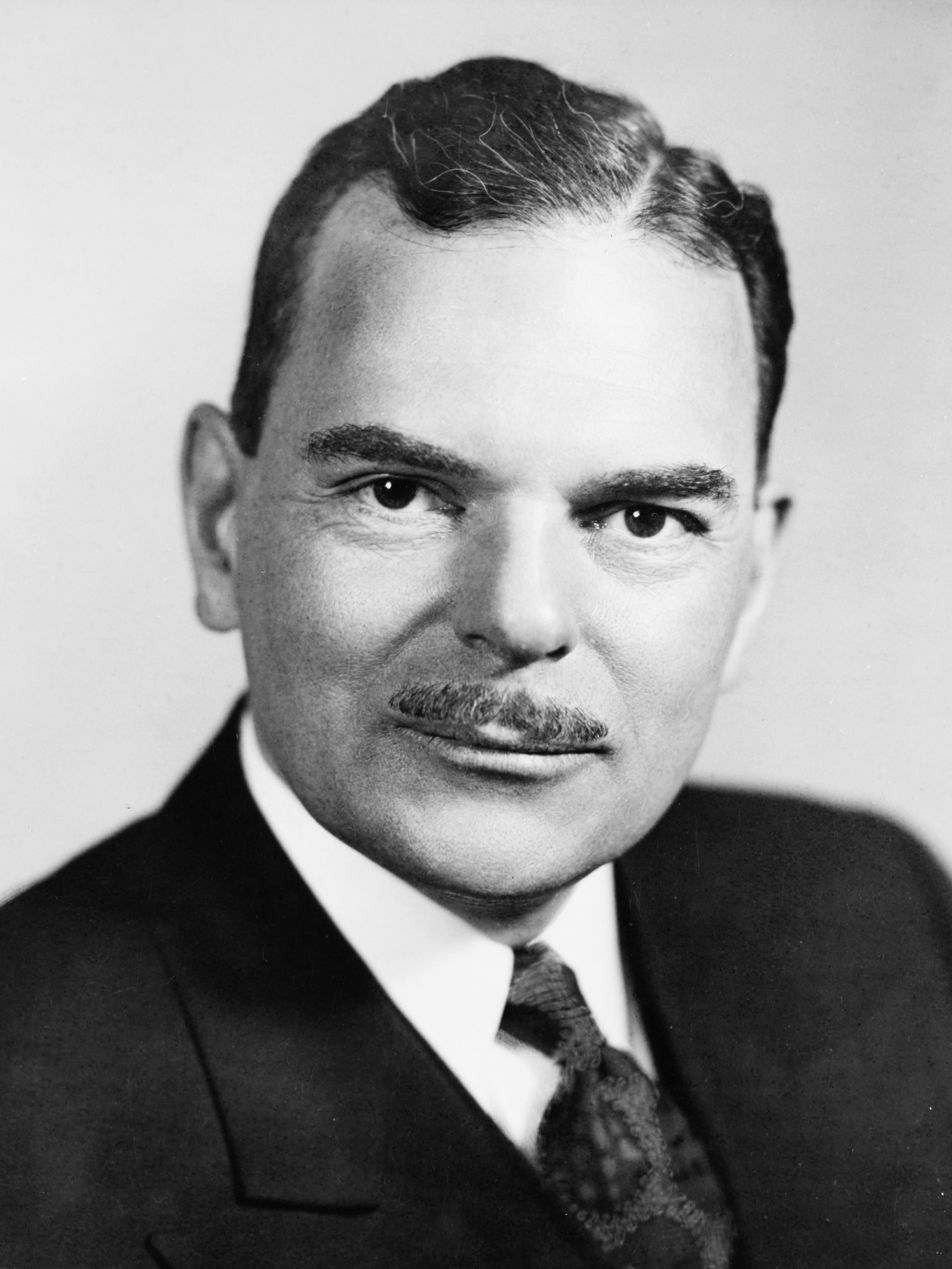
Nominee	Harry S. Truman	Thomas E. Dewey
Party	Democratic	Republican
Home state	Missouri	New York
Running mate	Alben W. Barkley	Earl Warren
Electoral vote	6	0
Popular vote	267,288	239,714
Percentage	51.88%	46.52%
County results
Truman
40–50%
50–60%
60–70%
Dewey
40–50%
50–60%
60–70%
President before election
Harry S. Truman
Democratic
Elected President
Harry S. Truman
Democratic

The 1948 United States presidential election in Colorado took place on November 2, 1948, as part of the 1948 United States presidential election. State voters chose six representatives, or electors, to the Electoral College, who voted for president and vice president.

Colorado was won by incumbent President Harry S. Truman (D–Missouri), running with Senator Alben W. Barkley, with 51.88% of the popular vote, against Governor Thomas E. Dewey (R–New York), running with Governor Earl Warren, with 46.52% of the popular vote. As of the 2024 election, Truman remains the last candidate to carry Colorado without winning Larimer County, as well as the last Democrat to win the national election without Adams County. Colorado also marks Truman's strongest performance in a state that Dewey had won against Franklin D. Roosevelt in 1944.

== Results ==
1948 United States presidential election in Colorado
Party	Candidate	Votes	%
Democratic	Harry S. Truman (inc.)	267,288	51.88%
Republican	Thomas E. Dewey	239,714	46.52%
Progressive	Henry A. Wallace	6,115	1.19%
Socialist	Norman Thomas	1,678	0.33%
Socialist Workers	Farrell Dobbs	228	0.04%
Socialist Labor	Edward A. Teichert	214	0.04%
Total votes		515,237	100%

=== Results by county ===
County	Harry S. Truman Democratic		Thomas E. Dewey Republican		Henry A. Wallace Progressive		Various candidates Other parties		Margin		Total votes cast
County	#	%	#	%	#	%	#	%	#	%	Total votes cast
Adams	4,419	40.95%	6,240	57.83%	99	0.92%	33	0.31%	-1,821	-16.88%	10,791
Alamosa	2,395	54.76%	1,950	44.58%	24	0.55%	5	0.11%	445	10.18%	4,374
Arapahoe	6,962	46.17%	7,943	52.67%	122	0.81%	53	0.35%	-981	-6.50%	15,080
Archuleta	479	44.19%	597	55.07%	4	0.37%	4	0.37%	-118	-10.88%	1,084
Baca	1,398	52.13%	1,260	46.98%	21	0.78%	3	0.11%	138	5.15%	2,682
Bent	1,658	55.56%	1,296	43.43%	18	0.60%	12	0.40%	362	12.13%	2,984
Boulder	8,792	44.32%	10,335	52.09%	488	2.46%	224	1.13%	-1,543	-7.77%	19,839
Chaffee	1,476	41.23%	2,065	57.68%	31	0.87%	8	0.22%	-589	-16.45%	3,580
Cheyenne	713	51.44%	657	47.40%	13	0.94%	3	0.22%	56	4.04%	1,386
Clear Creek	836	50.24%	810	48.68%	12	0.72%	6	0.36%	26	1.56%	1,664
Conejos	2,236	58.43%	1,532	40.03%	25	0.65%	34	0.89%	704	18.40%	3,827
Costilla	1,563	61.73%	921	36.37%	19	0.75%	29	1.15%	642	25.36%	2,532
Crowley	1,004	49.22%	1,027	50.34%	4	0.20%	5	0.25%	-23	-1.12%	2,040
Custer	384	40.72%	547	58.01%	10	1.06%	2	0.21%	-163	-17.29%	943
Delta	3,171	49.02%	3,158	48.82%	117	1.81%	23	0.36%	13	0.20%	6,469
Denver	89,489	52.93%	76,364	45.17%	2,420	1.43%	794	0.47%	13,125	7.76%	169,067
Dolores	435	54.31%	352	43.95%	14	1.75%	0	0.00%	83	10.36%	801
Douglas	767	43.68%	979	55.75%	5	0.28%	5	0.28%	-212	-12.07%	1,756
Eagle	1,008	55.05%	738	40.31%	80	4.37%	5	0.27%	270	14.74%	1,831
El Paso	12,291	43.25%	15,705	55.26%	258	0.91%	165	0.58%	-3,414	-12.01%	28,419
Elbert	873	42.61%	1,155	56.37%	19	0.93%	2	0.10%	-282	-13.76%	2,049
Fremont	4,077	47.26%	4,421	51.25%	95	1.10%	34	0.39%	-344	-3.99%	8,627
Garfield	2,364	49.03%	2,416	50.10%	37	0.77%	5	0.10%	-52	-1.07%	4,822
Gilpin	296	48.45%	302	49.43%	10	1.64%	3	0.49%	-6	-0.98%	611
Grand	763	48.85%	777	49.74%	12	0.77%	10	0.64%	-14	-0.89%	1,562
Gunnison	1,326	53.17%	1,103	44.23%	56	2.25%	9	0.36%	223	8.94%	2,494
Hinsdale	75	36.06%	133	63.94%	0	0.00%	0	0.00%	-58	-27.88%	208
Huerfano	3,448	63.73%	1,841	34.03%	115	2.13%	6	0.11%	1,607	29.70%	5,410
Jackson	291	47.09%	327	52.91%	0	0.00%	0	0.00%	-36	-5.82%	618
Jefferson	9,145	47.36%	9,903	51.29%	179	0.93%	81	0.42%	-758	-3.93%	19,308
Kiowa	659	46.05%	758	52.97%	11	0.77%	3	0.21%	-99	-6.92%	1,431
Kit Carson	1,281	40.27%	1,873	58.88%	17	0.53%	10	0.31%	-592	-18.61%	3,181
La Plata	2,536	47.37%	2,735	51.08%	75	1.40%	8	0.15%	-199	-3.71%	5,354
Lake	1,581	63.04%	838	33.41%	78	3.11%	11	0.44%	743	29.63%	2,508
Larimer	7,062	41.47%	9,813	57.63%	83	0.49%	71	0.42%	-2,751	-16.16%	17,029
Las Animas	7,586	67.67%	3,452	30.79%	133	1.19%	39	0.35%	4,134	36.88%	11,210
Lincoln	1,231	48.93%	1,271	50.52%	10	0.40%	4	0.16%	-40	-1.59%	2,516
Logan	3,179	49.30%	3,223	49.98%	33	0.51%	13	0.20%	-44	-0.68%	6,448
Mesa	8,401	55.32%	6,586	43.37%	137	0.90%	61	0.40%	1,815	11.95%	15,185
Mineral	190	56.72%	144	42.99%	1	0.30%	0	0.00%	46	13.73%	335
Moffat	1,101	46.05%	1,261	52.74%	23	0.96%	6	0.25%	-160	-6.69%	2,391
Montezuma	1,653	49.89%	1,630	49.20%	21	0.63%	9	0.27%	23	0.69%	3,313
Montrose	2,544	49.73%	2,473	48.34%	70	1.37%	29	0.57%	71	1.39%	5,116
Morgan	2,912	45.63%	3,417	53.54%	39	0.61%	14	0.22%	-505	-7.91%	6,382
Otero	8,640	66.30%	4,311	33.08%	61	0.47%	20	0.15%	4,329	33.22%	13,032
Ouray	461	44.11%	574	54.93%	7	0.67%	3	0.29%	-113	-10.82%	1,045
Park	505	43.84%	637	55.30%	9	0.78%	1	0.09%	-132	-11.46%	1,152
Phillips	932	45.49%	1,076	52.51%	32	1.56%	9	0.44%	-144	-7.02%	2,049
Pitkin	409	54.46%	319	42.48%	21	2.80%	2	0.27%	90	11.98%	751
Prowers	2,497	49.47%	2,505	49.63%	22	0.44%	23	0.46%	-8	-0.16%	5,047
Pueblo	21,637	61.75%	12,756	36.40%	572	1.63%	76	0.22%	8,881	25.35%	35,041
Rio Blanco	752	42.95%	981	56.03%	17	0.97%	1	0.06%	-229	-13.08%	1,751
Rio Grande	1,814	46.80%	2,049	52.86%	6	0.15%	7	0.18%	-235	-6.06%	3,876
Routt	2,088	57.19%	1,492	40.87%	56	1.53%	15	0.41%	596	16.32%	3,651
Saguache	1,009	52.09%	914	47.19%	10	0.52%	4	0.21%	95	4.90%	1,937
San Juan	348	49.71%	329	47.00%	21	3.00%	2	0.29%	19	2.71%	700
San Miguel	613	56.81%	451	41.80%	15	1.39%	0	0.00%	162	15.01%	1,079
Sedgwick	834	44.67%	1,020	54.63%	10	0.54%	3	0.16%	-186	-9.96%	1,867
Summit	378	56.00%	292	43.26%	3	0.44%	2	0.30%	86	12.74%	675
Teller	779	50.36%	748	48.35%	16	1.03%	4	0.26%	31	2.01%	1,547
Washington	1,308	44.16%	1,636	55.23%	11	0.24%	7	0.24%	-328	-11.07%	2,962
Weld	10,934	46.25%	12,446	52.65%	171	0.72%	88	0.37%	-1,512	-6.40%	23,639
Yuma	1,907	45.26%	2,277	54.05%	17	0.40%	12	0.28%	-370	-8.79%	4,213
Total	267,288	51.88%	239,714	46.52%	6,115	1.19%	2,120	0.41%	27,574	5.36%	515,237

==== Counties that flipped from Democratic to Republican ====
- Chaffee

==== Counties that flipped from Republican to Democratic ====
- Alamosa
- Baca
- Bent
- Cheyenne
- Clear Creek
- Delta
- Dolores
- Mineral
- Montezuma
- Montrose
- Otero
- Pitkin
- Saguache
- San Juan
- Summit
- Teller

== See also ==
- United States presidential elections in Colorado
