= 1892 United States presidential election in Colorado =

- November 8, 1892
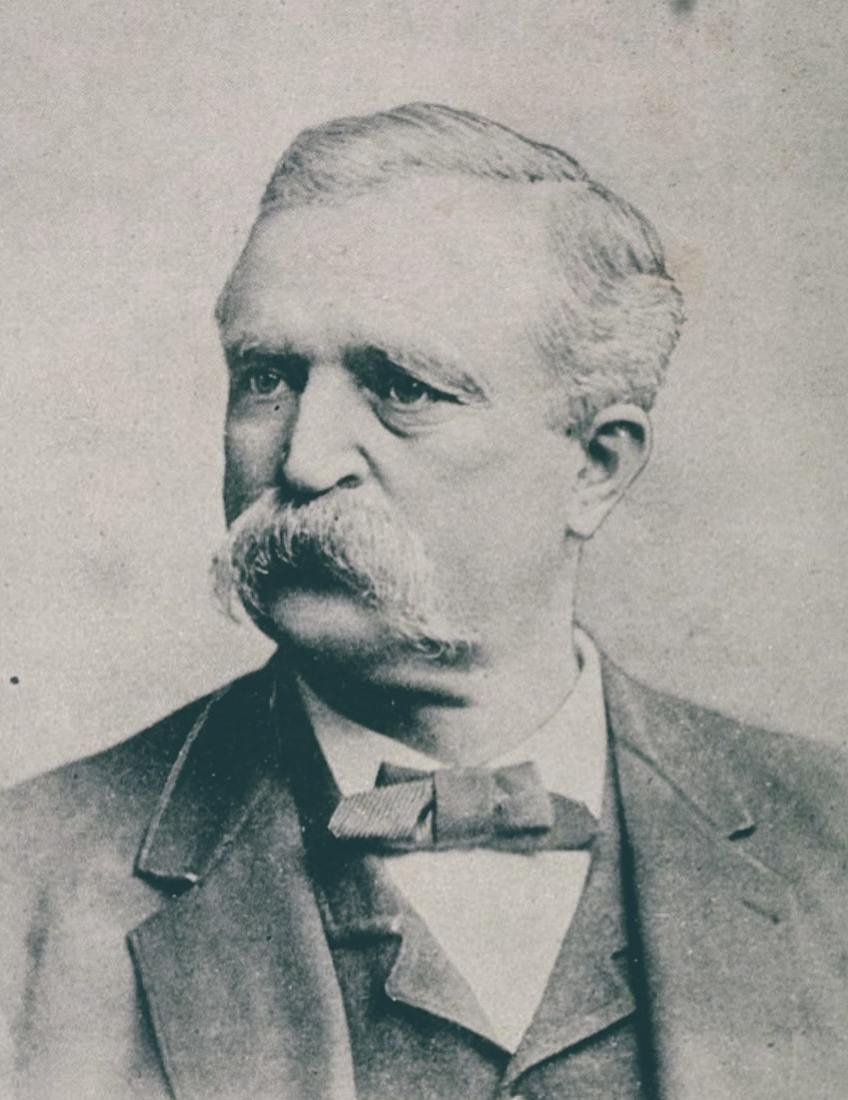

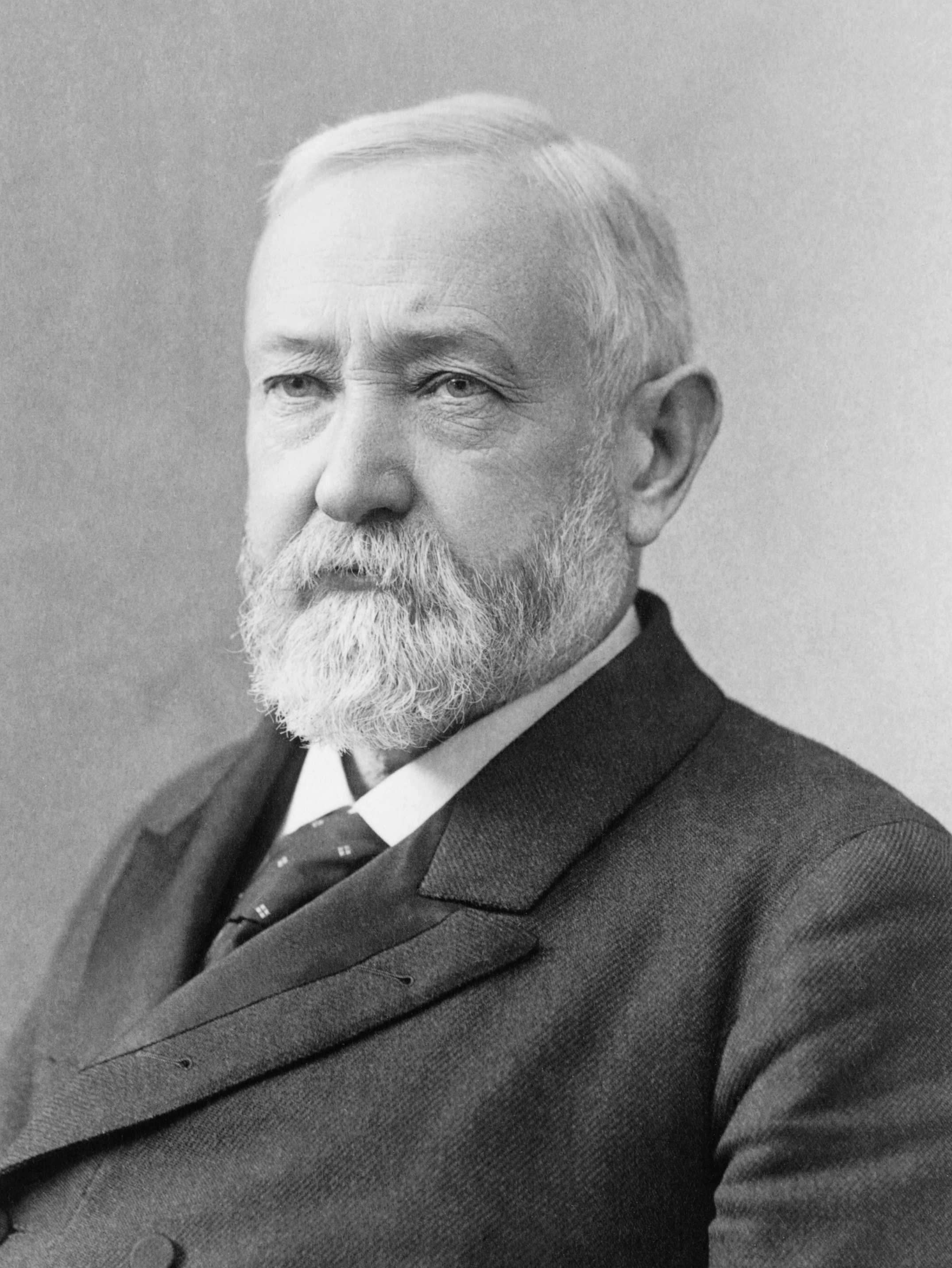
Nominee	James B. Weaver	Benjamin Harrison
Party	Populist	Republican
Alliance	Democratic
Home state	Iowa	Indiana
Running mate	James G. Field	Whitelaw Reid
Electoral vote	4	0
Popular vote	53,584	38,620
Percentage	57.07%	41.13%
County results
Weaver
40–50%
50–60%
60–70%
70–80%
80–90%
Harrison
40–50%
50–60%
60–70%
President before election
Benjamin Harrison
Republican
Elected President
Grover Cleveland
Democratic

The 1892 United States presidential election in Colorado took place on November 8, 1892. All contemporary 44 states were part of the 1892 United States presidential election. State voters chose four electors to the Electoral College, which selected the president and vice president.

In its early days as a state, Colorado had, like the Plains States to its east, been solidly Republican. Despite widespread criticism of the national party for its monetary policy, the Republicans continuously controlled the legislature and held the governorship for five of seven terms. Because Colorado was the leading silver-producing state in the nation, the policies of the federal government since President Hayes were deeply unpopular with both silver miners and mineowners. Crises emerging in Colorado's agricultural sector from low wheat prices and a severe drought in 1888 and 1889, combined with the state's underdevelopment produced resentment of the Northeast, where the Republican Party's power base was located.

== Campaign ==
On April 27, 1892, the Colorado Republican Party held their convention and passed a resolution demanding free silver. The party endorsed Benjamin Harrison as being "favorable to the white metal" at its second convention from September 8 to 9.

The Colorado Democratic Party held its convention from September 12 to 13.

The Populist Party's platform called for replacing the gold standard with the free coinage of silver at a 16:1 ratio with gold. This meant that outside the Hispanic south-central counties and some parts of the eastern High Plains, support for the Populist movement was extremely strong in the state, even among many conservatives who opposed the Populists’ economic philosophy but were concerned primarily about the silver issue. In order to achieve success, the newly formed Populist Party would fuse with the minority Democratic Party, although a proposed slate of electors pledged to national Democratic nominees Grover Cleveland and Adlai Stevenson I was not withdrawn with the instruction to support the Populist nominee James B. Weaver until the last week before the poll, after a long struggle within the state Democratic Party.

Polls on election day said Weaver was two-to-one on to carry Colorado, and in the end Weaver and running mate James G. Field carried the state by 15.94 points over the Republican nominees, incumbent President Benjamin Harrison of Indiana and his running mate Whitelaw Reid of New York. Weaver dominated most of the state, especially the high mountains and West Slope.

Colorado was one of a handful of states, five in total, that did not feature former and future President Grover Cleveland on their ballots. As of the 2024 U.S. presidential election, this is the only time Colorado voted for a third-party candidate.

== Results ==
1892 United States presidential election in Colorado
Party	Candidate	Votes	Percentage	Electoral votes
People's/Democratic	James B. Weaver	53,584	57.07%	4
Republican	Benjamin Harrison (incumbent)	38,620	41.13%	0
Prohibition	John Bidwell	1,687	1.80%	0
Totals		93,891	100.00%	4
Voter turnout				—

=== Results by county ===
County	Benjamin Harrison Republican		James B. Weaver Populist/Democratic		John Bidwell Prohibition		Margin (Note: Because Grover Cleveland was not on the ballot and no nominee was listed under the “Democratic” line, margin given is Harrison vote minus Weaver vote and percentage margin Harrison percentage minus Weaver percentage for all counties.)	
County	%	#	%	#	%	#	%	#
Cheyenne	66.67%	102	33.33%	51	0.00%	0	33.33%	51
Lincoln	64.57%	113	34.86%	61	0.57%	1	29.71%	52
Washington	62.97%	250	34.01%	135	3.02%	12	28.97%	115
Costilla	63.45%	526	35.95%	298	0.60%	5	27.50%	228
Douglas	57.60%	360	41.76%	261	0.64%	4	15.84%	99
Huerfano	57.56%	750	41.83%	545	0.61%	8	15.73%	205
Conejos	56.88%	823	42.43%	614	0.69%	10	14.44%	209
Logan	56.00%	322	42.61%	245	1.39%	8	13.39%	77
Kit Carson	54.10%	277	44.73%	229	1.17%	6	9.38%	48
Kiowa	53.55%	151	45.74%	129	0.71%	2	7.80%	22
Phillips	49.17%	266	44.55%	241	6.28%	34	4.62%	25
Rio Grande	48.82%	539	49.00%	541	2.17%	24	-0.18%	-2
Prowers	49.25%	229	49.89%	232	0.86%	4	-0.65%	-3
Routt	49.17%	325	50.23%	332	0.61%	4	-1.06%	-7
Arapahoe	48.11%	11,331	50.03%	11,783	1.86%	439	-1.92%	-452
El Paso	47.39%	2,657	49.46%	2,773	3.16%	177	-2.07%	-116
Baca	47.72%	157	50.46%	166	1.82%	6	-2.74%	-9
Morgan	47.60%	208	51.49%	225	0.92%	4	-3.89%	-17
Archuleta	47.98%	107	52.02%	116	0.00%	0	-4.04%	-9
Garfield	47.00%	634	51.89%	700	1.11%	15	-4.89%	-66
Pueblo	46.06%	2,404	52.40%	2,735	1.53%	80	-6.34%	-331
Larimer	43.05%	975	51.08%	1,157	5.87%	133	-8.04%	-182
Mesa	42.76%	529	50.85%	629	6.39%	79	-8.08%	-100
Jefferson	42.86%	792	51.46%	951	5.68%	105	-8.60%	-159
Sedgwick	44.86%	131	53.77%	157	1.37%	4	-8.90%	-26
Elbert	45.22%	189	54.55%	228	0.24%	1	-9.33%	-39
Grand	43.70%	104	55.88%	133	0.42%	1	-12.18%	-29
Custer	43.27%	296	55.99%	383	0.73%	5	-12.72%	-87
Otero	41.38%	480	55.60%	645	3.02%	35	-14.22%	-165
Weld	41.10%	1,138	56.48%	1,564	2.42%	67	-15.38%	-426
Las Animas	41.31%	1,276	58.14%	1,796	0.55%	17	-16.83%	-520
Chaffee	40.12%	678	58.99%	997	0.89%	15	-18.88%	-319
Fremont	39.13%	830	58.32%	1,237	2.55%	54	-19.19%	-407
Bent	40.30%	162	59.70%	240	0.00%	0	-19.40%	-78
Gunnison	38.71%	588	61.03%	927	0.26%	4	-22.32%	-339
Boulder	36.42%	1,338	60.40%	2,219	3.18%	117	-23.98%	-881
Park	36.92%	384	62.88%	654	0.19%	2	-25.96%	-270
Saguache	36.51%	326	63.05%	563	0.45%	4	-26.54%	-237
Rio Blanco	36.29%	127	62.86%	220	0.86%	3	-26.57%	-93
Yuma	35.29%	198	62.75%	352	1.96%	11	-27.45%	-154
Montrose	34.88%	301	63.62%	549	1.51%	13	-28.74%	-248
Delta	33.05%	237	64.02%	459	2.93%	21	-30.96%	-222
Gilpin	32.53%	431	64.23%	851	3.25%	43	-31.70%	-420
La Plata	33.58%	545	65.43%	1,062	0.99%	16	-31.85%	-517
Dolores	32.92%	294	67.08%	599	0.00%	0	-34.15%	-305
Lake	30.68%	1,003	69.04%	2,257	0.28%	9	-38.36%	-1,254
Eagle	29.22%	275	70.35%	662	0.43%	4	-41.13%	-387
Montezuma	27.83%	140	72.17%	363	0.00%	0	-44.33%	-223
Summit	25.60%	279	73.39%	800	1.01%	11	-47.80%	-521
Hinsdale	25.81%	412	74.19%	1,184	0.00%	0	-48.37%	-772
San Miguel	23.43%	272	75.54%	877	1.03%	12	-52.11%	-605
Clear Creek	22.10%	494	77.40%	1,730	0.49%	11	-55.30%	-1,236
Ouray	18.23%	324	81.20%	1,443	0.56%	10	-62.97%	-1,119
San Juan	16.52%	96	83.30%	484	0.17%	1	-66.78%	-388
Pitkin	13.69%	445	86.15%	2,800	0.15%	5	-72.46%	-2,355

== See also ==
- United States presidential elections in Colorado

== Works cited ==
- Knoles, George (1971). The Presidential Campaign and Election of 1892. Stanford University Press. ISBN 040450969X.
