= 1912 United States presidential election in Colorado =

- November 5, 1912

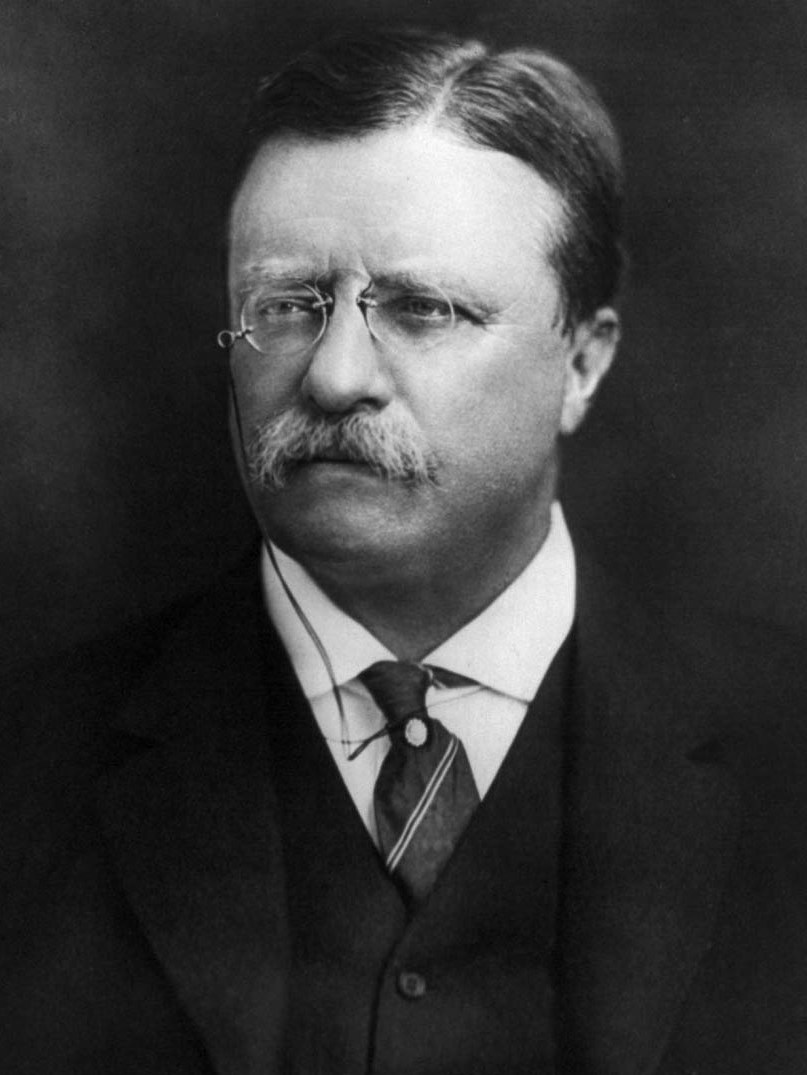

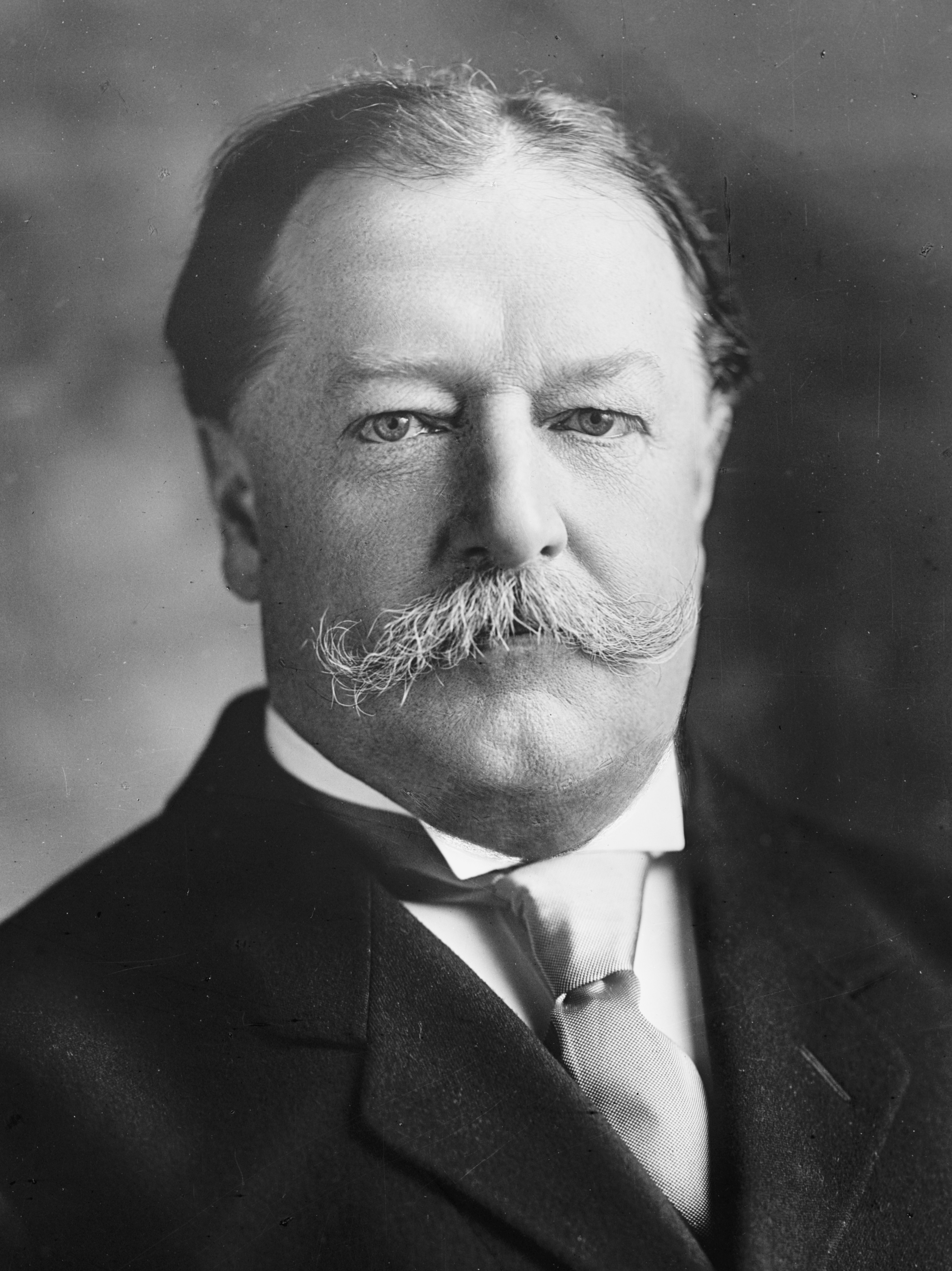

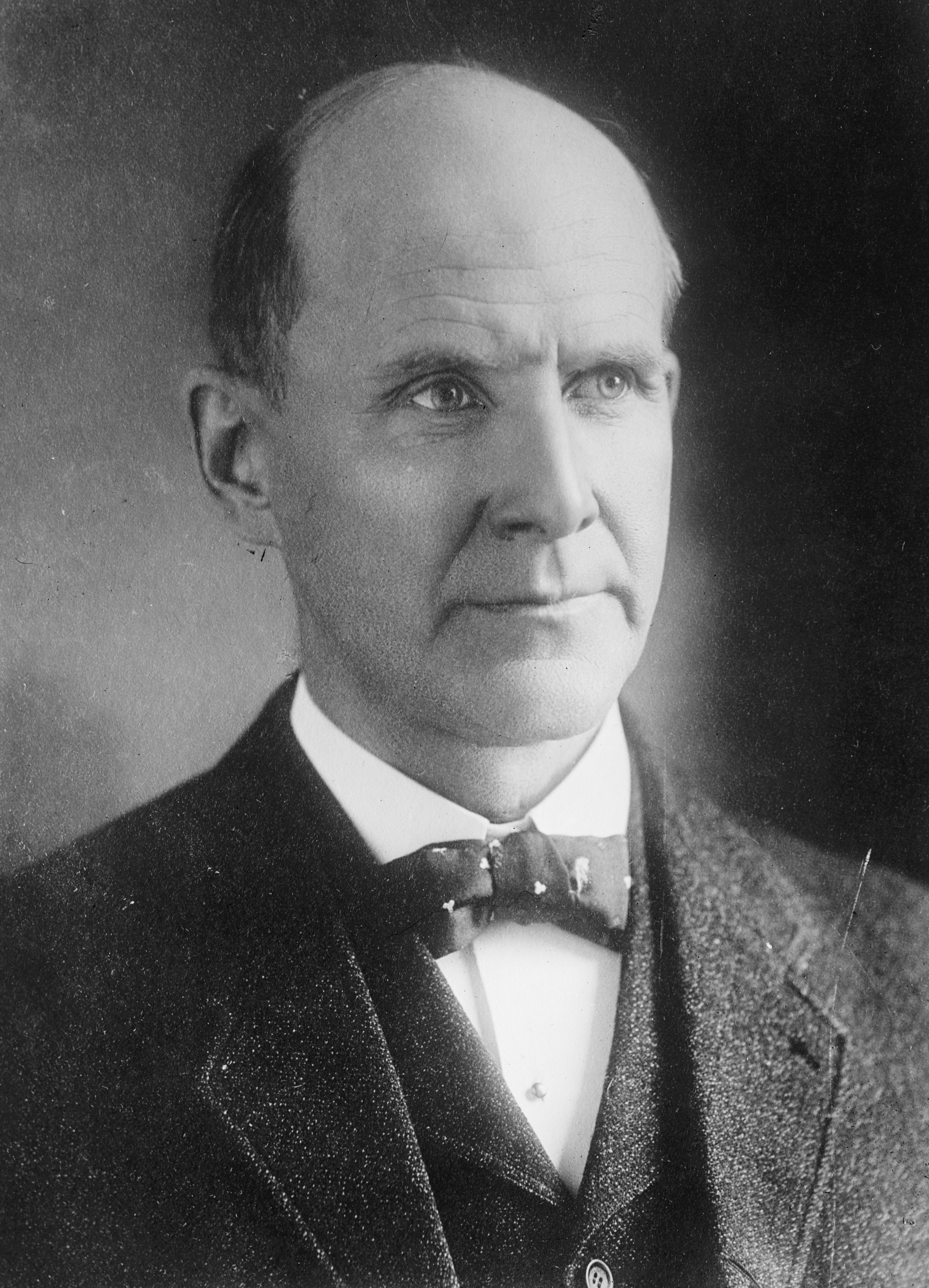
Nominee	Woodrow Wilson	Theodore Roosevelt
Party	Democratic	Progressive
Home state	New Jersey	New York
Running mate	Thomas R. Marshall	Hiram Johnson
Electoral vote	6	0
Popular vote	114,232	72,306
Percentage	42.80%	27.09%
Nominee	William Howard Taft	Eugene V. Debs
Party	Republican	Socialist
Home state	Ohio	Indiana
Running mate	Nicholas M. Butler	Emil Seidel
Electoral vote	0	0
Popular vote	58,386	16,418
Percentage	21.88%	6.15%
County results
Wilson
30–40%
40–50%
50–60%
60–70%
Roosevelt
30–40%
Taft
40–50%
50–60%
60–70%
President before election
William Howard Taft
Republican
Elected President
Woodrow Wilson
Democratic

The 1912 United States presidential election in Colorado took place on November 5, 1912, as part of the 1912 United States presidential election. State voters chose six representatives, or electors, to the Electoral College, who voted for president and vice president.

Colorado was won by New Jersey Governor Woodrow Wilson (D–New Jersey), running with governor of Indiana Thomas R. Marshall, with 42.80% of the popular vote, against the 26th president of the United States Theodore Roosevelt (P–New York), running with governor of California Hiram Johnson, with 27.09% of the popular vote, the 27th president of the United States William Howard Taft (R–Ohio), running with Columbia University President Nicholas Murray Butler, with 21.88% of the popular vote and the five-time candidate of the Socialist Party of America for President of the United States Eugene V. Debs (S–Indiana), running with the first Socialist mayor of a major city in the United States Emil Seidel, with 6.15% of the popular vote.

== Results ==
General Election Results
Party	Pledged to	Elector	Votes
Democratic Party	Woodrow Wilson	Henry P. Corbin	114,232
Democratic Party	Woodrow Wilson	Ozras T. Clark	114,074
Democratic Party	Woodrow Wilson	Lemuel Gammon	114,023
Democratic Party	Woodrow Wilson	Finley Dye	113,926
Democratic Party	Woodrow Wilson	Theo C. Bode	113,912
Democratic Party	Woodrow Wilson	Gertrude A. Lee	113,863
Progressive Party	Theodore Roosevelt	John Grass	72,306
Progressive Party	Theodore Roosevelt	Philip B. Stewart	71,854
Progressive Party	Theodore Roosevelt	Charles N. Crowder	71,822
Progressive Party	Theodore Roosevelt	Walter H. Trask	71,793
Progressive Party	Theodore Roosevelt	Patrick Byrnes	71,752
Progressive Party	Theodore Roosevelt	Merle D. Vincent	71,714
Republican Party	William Howard Taft	Thomas J. Downen	58,386
Republican Party	William Howard Taft	John C. Osgood	58,300
Republican Party	William Howard Taft	Paul Wilson	58,272
Republican Party	William Howard Taft	Horace G. Lunt	58,267
Republican Party	William Howard Taft	Alfred R. Fischer	58,249
Republican Party	William Howard Taft	Whitney Newton	58,237
Socialist Party	Eugene V. Debs	Mary A. Vetter	16,418
Socialist Party	Eugene V. Debs	T. J. Brown	16,366
Socialist Party	Eugene V. Debs	G. H. Wilson	16,348
Socialist Party	Eugene V. Debs	George W. Charette	16,344
Socialist Party	Eugene V. Debs	William Jones	16,332
Socialist Party	Eugene V. Debs	Kenneth Morrison	16,322
Prohibition Party	Eugene W. Chafin	George W. Avery	5,063
Prohibition Party	Eugene W. Chafin	Jonathan A. Nesbitt	5,030
Prohibition Party	Eugene W. Chafin	Wilbur F. Steele	5,027
Prohibition Party	Eugene W. Chafin	Phidelah A. Rice	5,024
Prohibition Party	Eugene W. Chafin	James Allen Cochran	5,021
Prohibition Party	Eugene W. Chafin	Henry M. Seyler	5,011
Socialist Labor Party	Arthur E. Reimer	George Anderson	475
Socialist Labor Party	Arthur E. Reimer	Ludwig Glinther	431
Socialist Labor Party	Arthur E. Reimer	Abraham Judelovitz	430
Socialist Labor Party	Arthur E. Reimer	A. T. Ljunberg	430
Socialist Labor Party	Arthur E. Reimer	Albert Wernet	424
Socialist Labor Party	Arthur E. Reimer	A. Ohman	419
Votes cast (Note: Based on totals for highest elector on each ticket)			266,880

=== Results by county ===
County	Thomas Woodrow Wilson Democratic		William Howard Taft Republican		Theodore Roosevelt Progressive "Bull Moose"		Eugene Victor Debs Socialist		Various candidates Other parties		Margin	
County	%	#	%	#	%	#	%	#	%	#	%	#
Summit	62.18%	600	18.55%	179	15.75%	152	3.11%	30	0.41%	4	43.63% (Note: In this county where Roosevelt did run behind both Taft and Wilson, margin given is Wilson percentage minus Taft percentage and vote total margin Wilson total minus Taft total.)	421
Pitkin	57.51%	770	15.53%	208	13.14%	176	12.70%	170	1.12%	15	41.97%	562
Montezuma	56.69%	1,017	15.89%	285	19.62%	352	6.69%	120	1.11%	20	37.07%	665
Clear Creek	59.25%	1,166	23.83%	469	12.35%	243	3.30%	65	1.27%	25	35.42%	697
Dolores	53.68%	124	19.48%	45	12.12%	28	14.72%	34	0.00%	0	34.20%	79
San Juan	54.04%	555	22.49%	231	8.67%	89	14.41%	148	0.39%	4	31.55%	324
La Plata	49.86%	1,775	19.44%	692	18.17%	647	10.39%	370	2.13%	76	30.42%	1,083
Gilpin	56.02%	931	26.65%	443	13.36%	222	3.25%	54	0.72%	12	29.36%	488
Gunnison	52.41%	1,206	24.03%	553	15.51%	357	6.78%	156	1.26%	29	28.38%	653
Ouray	48.43%	710	18.62%	273	20.33%	298	11.94%	175	0.68%	10	28.10%	412
Teller	52.11%	3,027	11.64%	676	24.19%	1,405	11.60%	674	0.46%	27	27.92%	1,622
Chaffee	48.34%	1,641	21.30%	723	20.41%	693	8.31%	282	1.65%	56	27.04%	918
Grand	52.70%	507	25.78%	248	18.50%	178	1.87%	18	1.14%	11	26.92%	259
Pueblo	49.20%	7,643	19.64%	3,050	24.58%	3,818	4.65%	722	1.93%	300	24.62%	3,825
Park	53.92%	529	29.87%	293	11.21%	110	4.69%	46	0.31%	3	24.06%	236
Garfield	46.25%	1,806	21.10%	824	22.54%	880	8.12%	317	2.00%	78	23.71%	926
Routt	49.82%	1,408	26.11%	738	13.98%	395	8.81%	249	1.27%	36	23.71%	670
Lake	45.87%	1,933	22.92%	966	20.50%	864	10.13%	427	0.57%	24	22.95%	967
Eagle	48.53%	727	25.83%	387	15.62%	234	9.41%	141	0.60%	9	22.70%	340
Otero	46.80%	2,885	20.98%	1,293	25.67%	1,582	3.97%	245	2.58%	159	21.14%	1,303
Rio Grande	46.03%	1,286	24.98%	698	22.37%	625	4.22%	118	2.40%	67	21.05%	588
Douglas	46.82%	619	28.21%	373	21.94%	290	2.27%	30	0.76%	10	18.61%	246
Fremont	43.80%	2,823	20.88%	1,346	25.20%	1,624	7.39%	476	2.73%	176	18.60%	1,199
San Miguel	48.88%	1,029	30.36%	639	14.25%	300	5.61%	118	0.90%	19	18.53%	390
Boulder	40.77%	4,330	23.02%	2,445	23.25%	2,469	8.64%	918	4.31%	458	17.52%	1,861
Custer	51.41%	510	34.98%	347	10.99%	109	1.92%	19	0.71%	7	16.43%	163
Mineral	44.48%	286	28.93%	186	10.58%	68	15.09%	97	0.93%	6	15.55%	100
Crowley	43.66%	719	28.35%	467	21.62%	356	3.64%	60	2.73%	45	15.30%	252
Rio Blanco	48.08%	538	33.24%	372	16.53%	185	1.52%	17	0.63%	7	14.83%	166
Weld	41.46%	4,713	27.39%	3,114	23.57%	2,679	3.74%	425	3.84%	437	14.07%	1,599
Adams	46.48%	1,312	14.10%	398	33.37%	942	4.85%	137	1.20%	34	13.11%	370
Jefferson	43.10%	2,309	18.87%	1,011	30.80%	1,650	5.73%	307	1.49%	80	12.30%	659
Moffat	43.60%	409	31.34%	294	19.83%	186	3.41%	32	1.81%	17	12.26%	115
Montrose	39.39%	1,478	16.82%	631	27.24%	1,022	11.49%	431	5.06%	190	12.15%	456
Conejos	46.48%	2,147	34.36%	1,587	13.12%	606	4.87%	225	1.17%	54	12.12%	560
Archuleta	45.21%	609	33.56%	452	17.37%	234	2.67%	36	1.19%	16	11.66%	157
Kiowa	42.82%	638	18.32%	273	32.21%	480	4.16%	62	2.48%	37	10.60%	158
Baca	38.19%	430	28.24%	318	21.40%	241	9.86%	111	2.31%	26	9.95%	112
Larimer	36.27%	2,597	26.98%	1,932	23.20%	1,661	7.62%	546	5.93%	425	9.29%	665
Denver	44.47%	26,690	13.59%	8,155	36.09%	21,657	4.58%	2,750	1.27%	764	8.39%	5,033
Logan	40.66%	1,338	20.18%	664	33.12%	1,090	3.80%	125	2.25%	74	7.54%	248
Cheyenne	37.78%	507	17.66%	237	30.85%	414	11.03%	148	2.68%	36	6.93%	93
Saguache	42.80%	859	36.37%	730	13.60%	273	6.83%	137	0.40%	8	6.43%	129
Elbert	36.96%	757	24.22%	496	30.76%	630	5.91%	121	2.15%	44	6.20%	127
Hinsdale	44.60%	157	38.64%	136	7.67%	27	9.09%	32	0.00%	0	5.97%	21
Delta	36.67%	1,808	16.28%	803	31.70%	1,563	11.36%	560	4.00%	197	4.97%	245
Jackson	47.45%	242	42.75%	218	6.67%	34	1.96%	10	1.18%	6	4.71%	24
Phillips	37.68%	448	22.37%	266	33.05%	393	3.87%	46	3.03%	36	4.63%	55
Bent	37.82%	730	21.76%	420	35.23%	680	1.97%	38	3.21%	62	2.59%	50
Washington	38.87%	765	18.34%	361	36.53%	719	3.61%	71	2.64%	52	2.34%	46
Morgan	33.10%	1,005	28.16%	855	30.83%	936	4.18%	127	3.72%	113	2.27%	69
El Paso	36.95%	5,559	18.72%	2,816	35.44%	5,332	6.17%	928	2.73%	411	1.51%	227
Prowers	32.62%	1,042	29.05%	928	31.40%	1,003	4.76%	152	2.16%	69	1.22%	39
Arapahoe	36.33%	1,379	20.15%	765	35.41%	1,344	7.03%	267	1.08%	41	0.92%	35
Kit Carson	31.69%	719	25.08%	569	31.20%	708	9.83%	223	2.20%	50	0.48%	11
Mesa	34.93%	2,733	12.47%	976	34.80%	2,723	14.46%	1,131	3.34%	261	0.13%	10
Lincoln	34.90%	796	23.41%	534	34.85%	795	3.33%	76	3.51%	80	0.04%	1
Yuma	36.20%	1,170	14.42%	466	37.69%	1,218	9.87%	319	1.83%	59	-1.49%	-48
Sedgwick	30.59%	338	29.68%	328	35.48%	392	2.53%	28	1.72%	19	-4.89%	-54
Las Animas	36.57%	3,604	43.82%	4,318	14.83%	1,461	3.92%	386	0.86%	85	-7.25%	-714
Costilla	29.12%	567	55.06%	1,072	10.48%	204	3.65%	71	1.69%	33	-25.94%	-505
Huerfano	28.74%	1,277	63.32%	2,814	5.85%	260	1.44%	64	0.65%	29	-34.59%	-1,537

== See also ==
- United States presidential elections in Colorado
