= Davies House =

Davies House may refer to:

- Davies House (Berks County, Pennsylvania)
- Betts House (Yale University), a Yale University building in New Haven, Connecticut formerly known as the Davies House
- George S. Clement House, Wauseon, Ohio, USA, also known as Davies House
- Edward Davies House, Churchtown, Pennsylvania
- Charles E. Davies House, Provo, Utah
- Dr. James Davies House, Boise, Idaho, listed on the National Register of Historic Places (NRHP) in Ada County
- A house in Bayside

== See also ==
- Davies Manor, Memphis, Tennessee
- William Davie House (disambiguation)
- Davies' Chuck Wagon Diner, Lakewood, Colorado, listed on the National Register of Historic Places (NRHP) in Jefferson County
- Davies Hotel, Lamar, Colorado, NRHP-listed in Prowers County
- Davies Building, Topeka, Kansas, NRHP-listed in Shawnee County
