= National Register of Historic Places listings in Prowers County, Colorado =

Location of Prowers County in Colorado

This is a list of the National Register of Historic Places listings in Prowers County, Colorado.

This is intended to be a complete list of the properties and districts on the National Register of Historic Places in Prowers County, Colorado, United States. The locations of National Register properties and districts for which the latitude and longitude coordinates are included below, may be seen in a map.

There are 17 properties and districts listed on the National Register in the county, including 1 National Historic Landmark.

This National Park Service list is complete through NPS recent listings posted August 28, 2026.

== Current listings ==
	Name on the Register	Image	Date listed	Location	City or town	Description
1	Atchison, Topeka and Santa Fe Railway Passenger Depot	Atchison, Topeka and Santa Fe Railway Passenger Depot	July 19, 2019 (#100004186)	109 E. Beech St. 38°05′23″N 102°37′05″W	Lamar	
2	Davies Hotel	Davies Hotel	October 19, 1978 (#78000875)	122 N. Main; 38°05′27″N 102°37′08″W	Lamar	
3	Douglas Crossing Bridge	Douglas Crossing Bridge	February 4, 1985 (#85000224)	County Road 28; 37°47′43″N 102°15′20″W	Granada	
4	Granada Bridge	Granada Bridge	October 15, 2002 (#02001138)	U.S. Route 385 at milepost 97.32; 38°05′38″N 102°18′37″W	Granada	
5	Granada Historic Commercial District		June 30, 2025 (#100011970)	20 N. Main St. - 24 N. Main St. - 26 N. Main St. 38°03′47″N 102°18′38″W	Granada	
6	Granada Relocation Center	Granada Relocation Center	May 18, 1994 (#94000425)	23900 County Road FF, approximately 1 mile southwest of Granada; 38°02′58″N 102°19′43″W	Granada	
7	Holly City Hall	Holly City Hall	October 10, 2003 (#03001010)	119 E. Cheyenne St. 38°03′07″N 102°07′17″W	Holly	
8	Holly Gymnasium	Holly Gymnasium	April 24, 2007 (#07000344)	N. Main St. 38°03′18″N 102°07′19″W	Holly	
9	Holly Santa Fe Depot	Holly Santa Fe Depot	July 28, 1995 (#95000935)	302 S. Main St. 38°03′01″N 102°07′24″W	Holly	
10	Holly SS Ranch Barn	Holly SS Ranch Barn	February 25, 2004 (#04000068)	407 West Vinson; 38°02′56″N 102°07′22″W	Holly	
11	Paulsen Farm	Paulsen Farm	December 9, 1999 (#99001542)	39035 Road 7; 38°12′28″N 102°37′54″W	Lamar	
12	Petticrew Stage Stop		August 24, 2000 (#00000936)	Address restricted	Lamar	About 25 miles (40 km) south of Lamar on the Cedar Cliff Ranch
13	Prowers County Building	Prowers County Building	September 21, 1981 (#81000186)	301 S. Main St. 38°05′12″N 102°37′07″W	Lamar	
14	Prowers County Welfare Housing	Prowers County Welfare Housing	December 22, 2009 (#09001121)	800 E. Maple St. 38°05′33″N 102°36′38″W	Lamar	
15	US Post Office-Lamar Main	US Post Office-Lamar Main	January 22, 1986 (#86000179)	300 S. 5th St. 38°05′12″N 102°37′19″W	Lamar	
16	Wiley Rock Schoolhouse	Wiley Rock Schoolhouse	February 20, 2004 (#04000057)	603 Main St. 38°09′24″N 102°43′11″W	Wiley	
17	Willow Creek Park	Willow Creek Park	August 7, 2007 (#07000789)	Roughly bounded by Memorial Dr., Parkview Ave., and Willow Valley Rd. 38°04′28″N 102°36′51″W	Lamar	

== See also ==
- List of National Historic Landmarks in Colorado
- List of National Register of Historic Places in Colorado
- Bibliography of Colorado
- Geography of Colorado
- History of Colorado
- Index of Colorado-related articles
- List of Colorado-related lists
- Outline of Colorado
