= Cora R. Strain =

State legislator in Colorado

Cora Ransom Strain (1871–1960) was a businessman and state legislator in Colorado. A Republican, he represented Prowers County from 1943 to 1948 in the Colorado House of Representatives.

He was born in Paynetown, Indiana. He lived in Lamar, Colorado. Hackett D. Smith defeated him in the 1948 election.

His brother Leco Perch "Lee" Strain (1887–1976) of La Junta served in the Colorado Senate for 13 years. Cora Strain's son Marion Evans Strain served in the Colorado House of Representatives.
