= Poole Forge =

- U.S. National Register of Historic Places
- U.S. Historic district
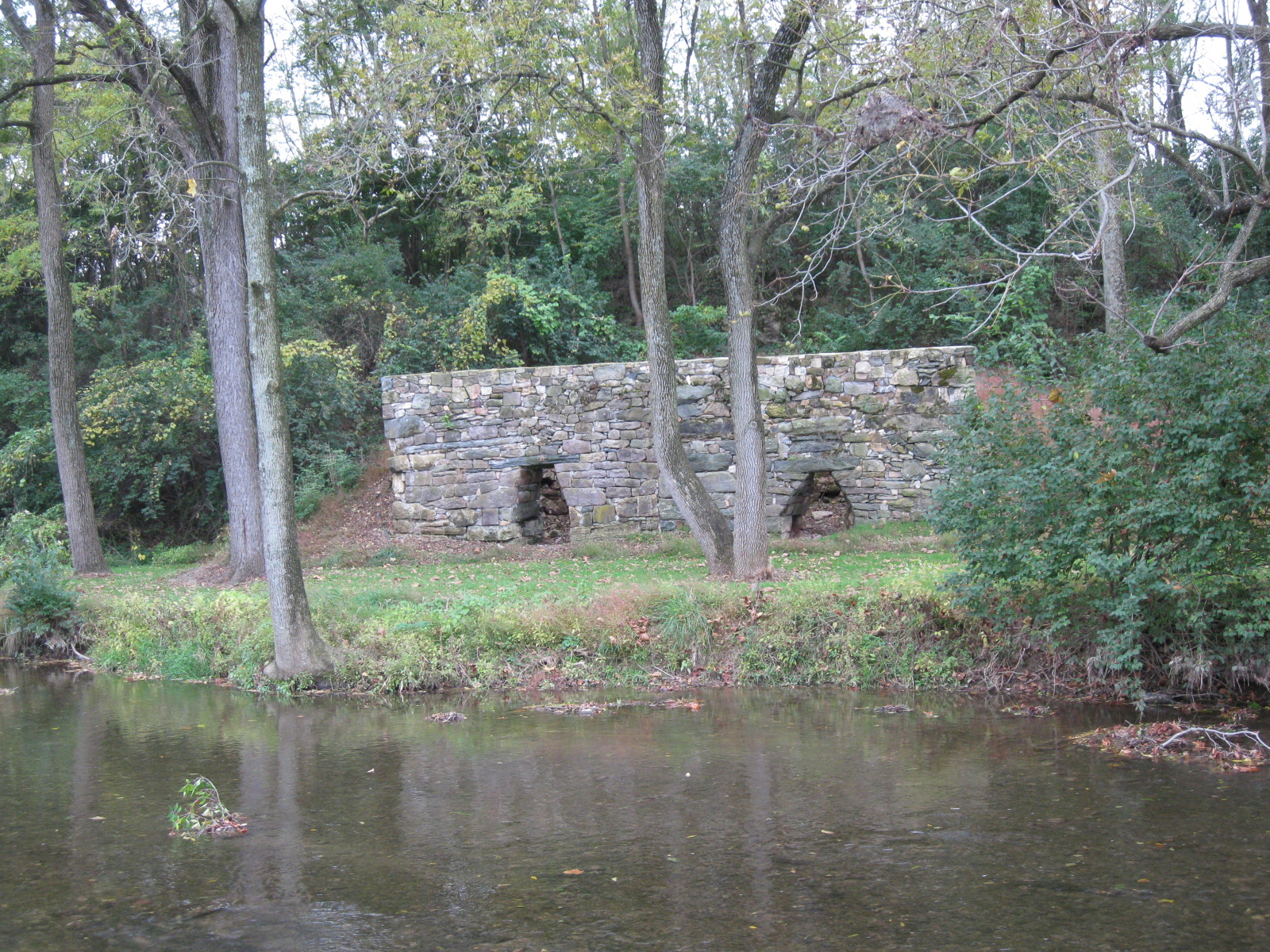
- Lime kilns

- Location within Pennsylvania Location within the United States
- Location: 1936, 1938, 1940 and 1942 Main St., Narvon, Caernarvon Township, Pennsylvania
- Coordinates: 40°07′50″N 75°58′35″W
- Area: 23 acres (9.3 ha)
- Built: c. 1779
- Architectural style: Federal, Georgian
- MPS: Iron and Steel Resources of Pennsylvania MPS
- NRHP reference No.: 93000351
- Added to NRHP: April 29, 1993

Poole Forge is an historic iron forge complex and national historic district in Narvon, Caernarvon Township, Lancaster County, Pennsylvania, United States.

It was listed on the National Register of Historic Places in 1993.

== History and architectural features ==
This district includes five contributing buildings and two contributing structures. They are the Ironmaster's Mansion, Paymaster's Building, spring house, two tenant houses, and the ruins of a lime kiln and Pool Forge Covered Bridge. The oldest section of the Ironmaster's Mansion was built circa 1779. It is an L-shaped building that was made from brownstone and ironstone, using Federal-style details.

== Gallery ==
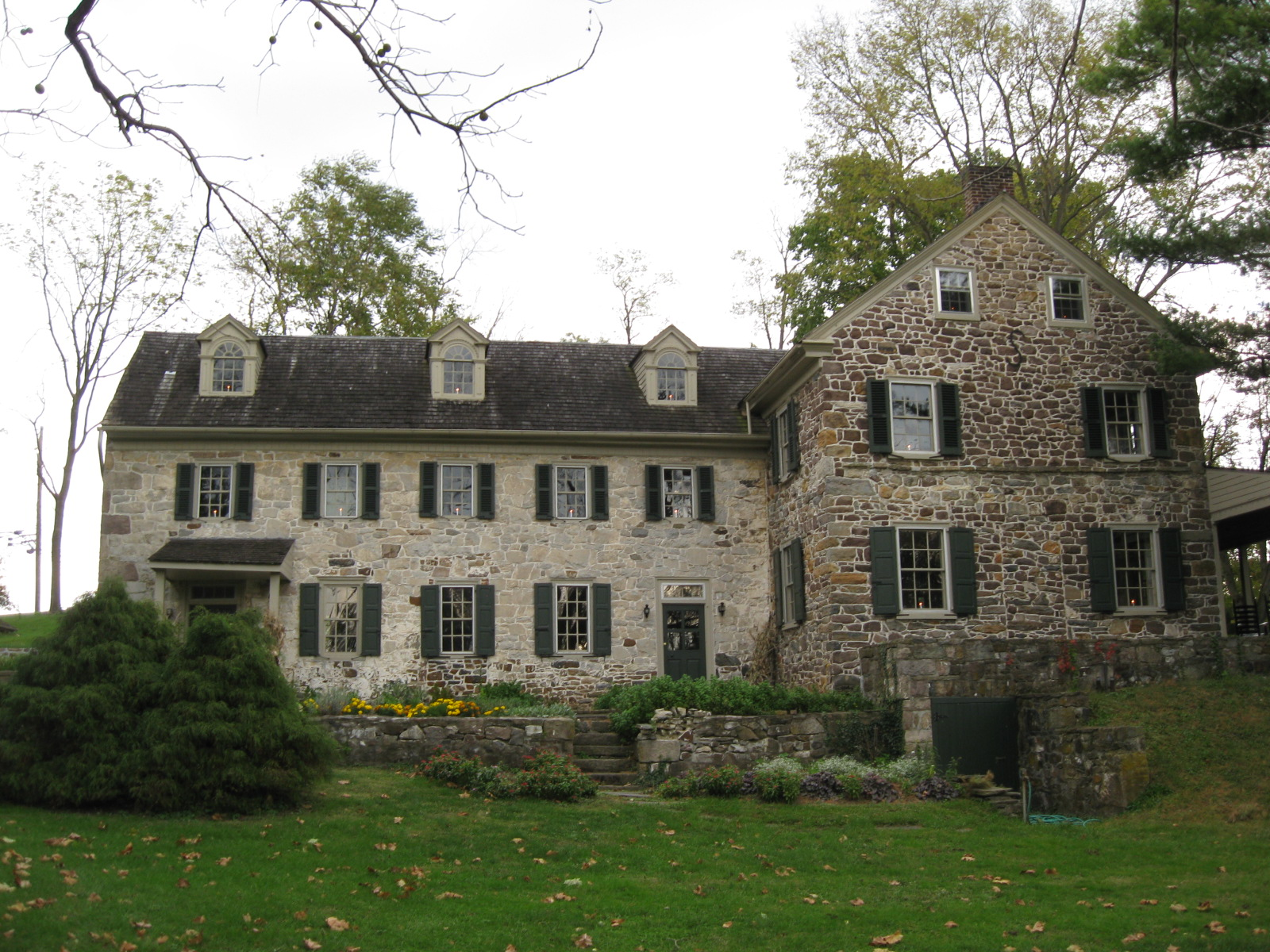

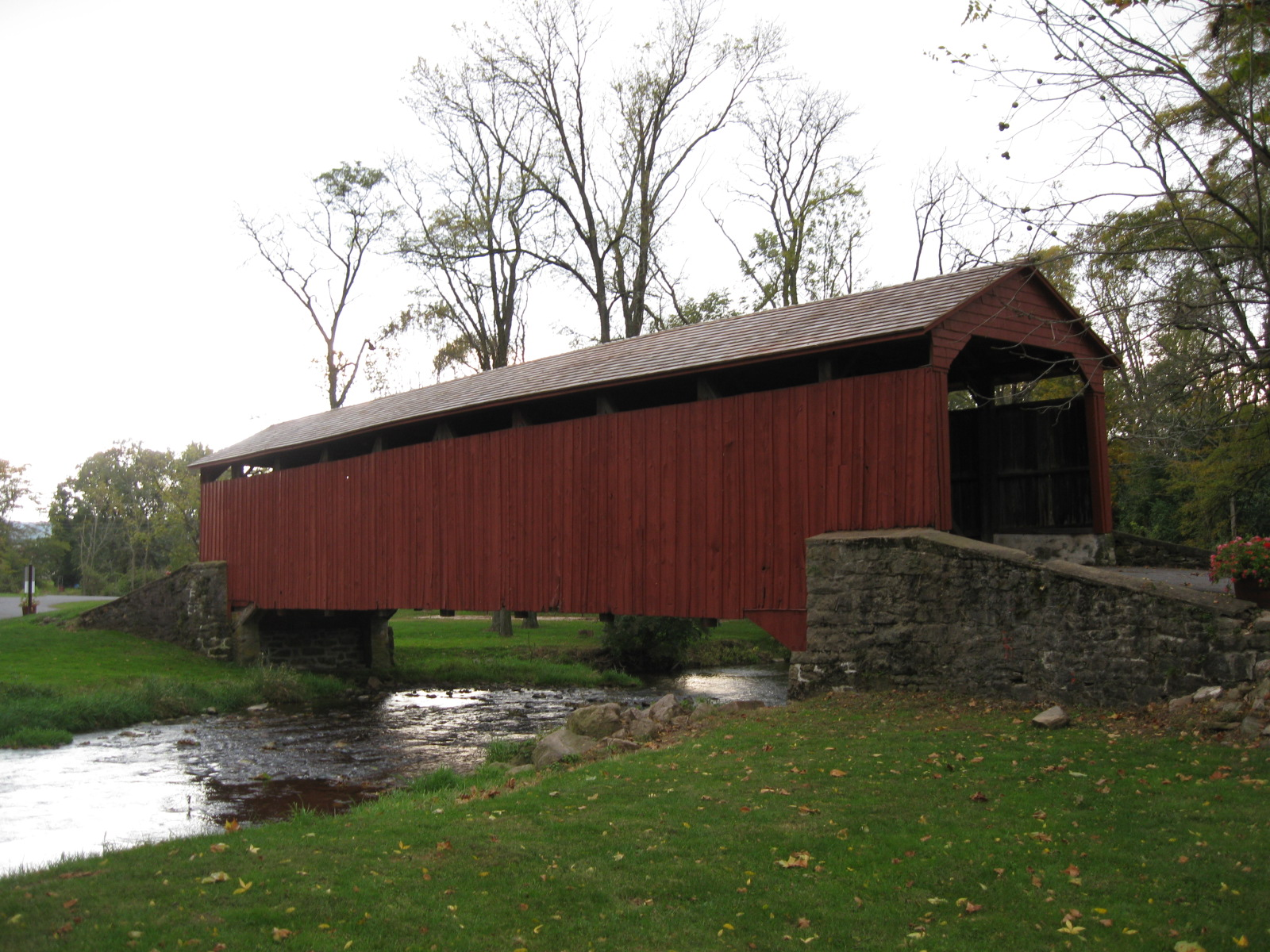

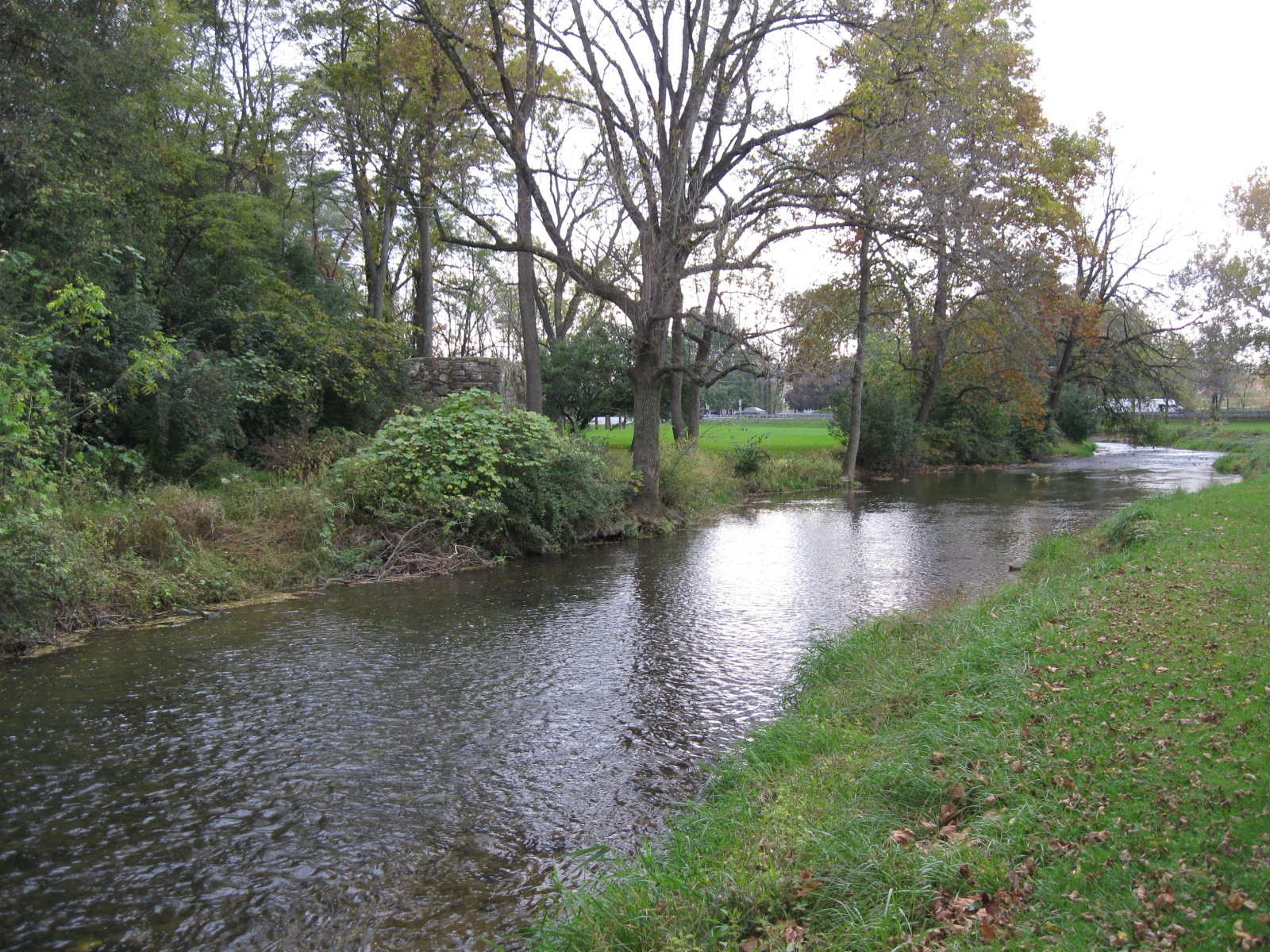

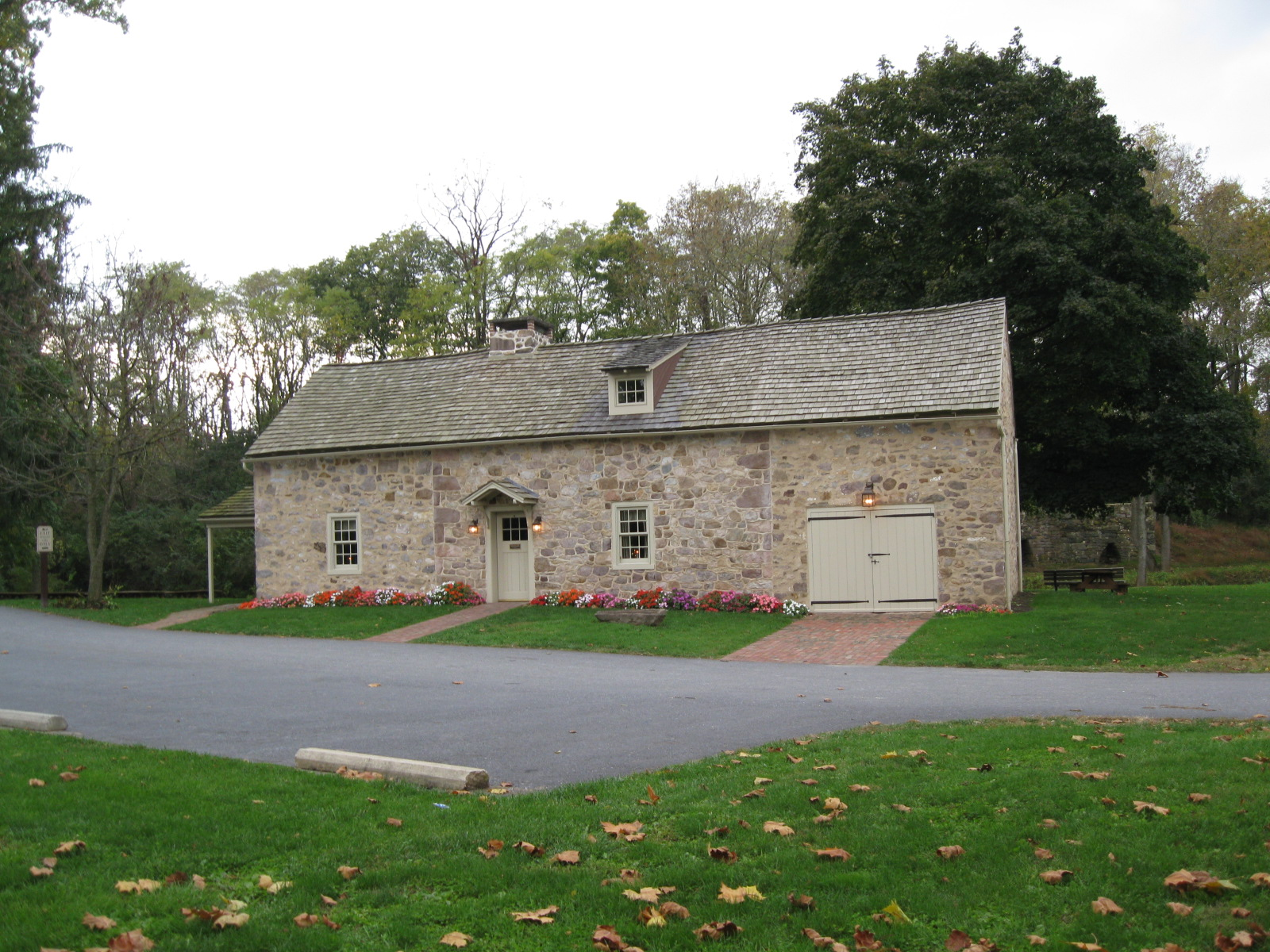
