= Caernarvon Township, Pennsylvania =

Caernarvon Township is the name of some places in the U.S. state of Pennsylvania:

- Caernarvon Township, Berks County, Pennsylvania
- Caernarvon Township, Lancaster County, Pennsylvania
