= Churchtown, Pennsylvania =

Unincorporated community in Pennsylvania, US

- Census-designated place
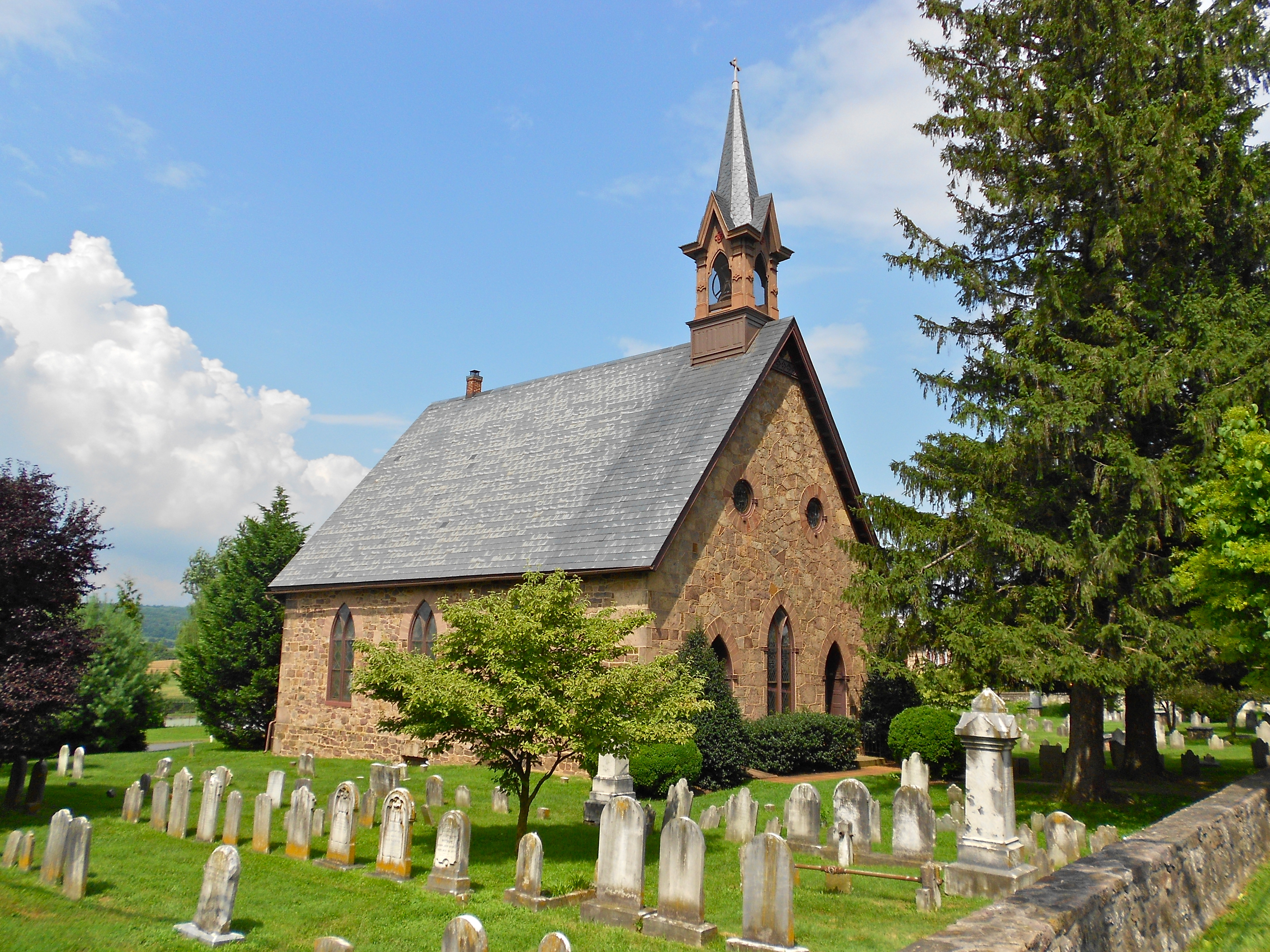
- Bangor Episcopal Church

- Location in Pennsylvania Location in the United States
- Coordinates: 40°7′59″N 75°57′53″W
- Country: United States
- State: Pennsylvania
- County: Lancaster
- Township: Caernarvon

Area
  - Total: 1.90 sq mi (4.92 km^{2})
  - Land: 1.88 sq mi (4.88 km^{2})
  - Water: 0.015 sq mi (0.04 km^{2})
- Elevation: 564 ft (172 m)

Population (2020)
  - Total: 417
  - Density: 221.3/sq mi (85.43/km^{2})
- Time zone: UTC-5 (Eastern (EST))
  - Summer (DST): UTC-4 (EDT)
- ZIP code: 17555
- Area code: 717
- FIPS code: 42-13632
- GNIS feature ID: 1171873

Churchtown is an unincorporated community and census-designated place (CDP) in Caernarvon Township, Lancaster County, Pennsylvania, United States, along Pennsylvania Route 23. The population was 470 as of the 2010 census.

== History ==
The first settlers of the oldest Amish settlement still in existence, the Lancaster Amish settlement, settled near Churchtown.

The Bangor Episcopal Church, Caernarvon Presbyterian Church and Edward Davies House are listed on the National Register of Historic Places.

== Geography ==
Churchtown is in eastern Lancaster County, in the center of Caernarvon Township. Pennsylvania Route 23 is the community's Main Street, leading east 4 miles (6 km) to Morgantown and west 20 miles (32 km) to Lancaster, the county seat.

According to the U.S. Census Bureau, the Churchtown CDP has a total area of 1.9 square miles (4.9 km^{2}), of which 0.02 square miles (0.04 km^{2}), or 0.71%, are water. The community sits on a ridge draining south to the Conestoga River, a west-flowing tributary of the Susquehanna River.

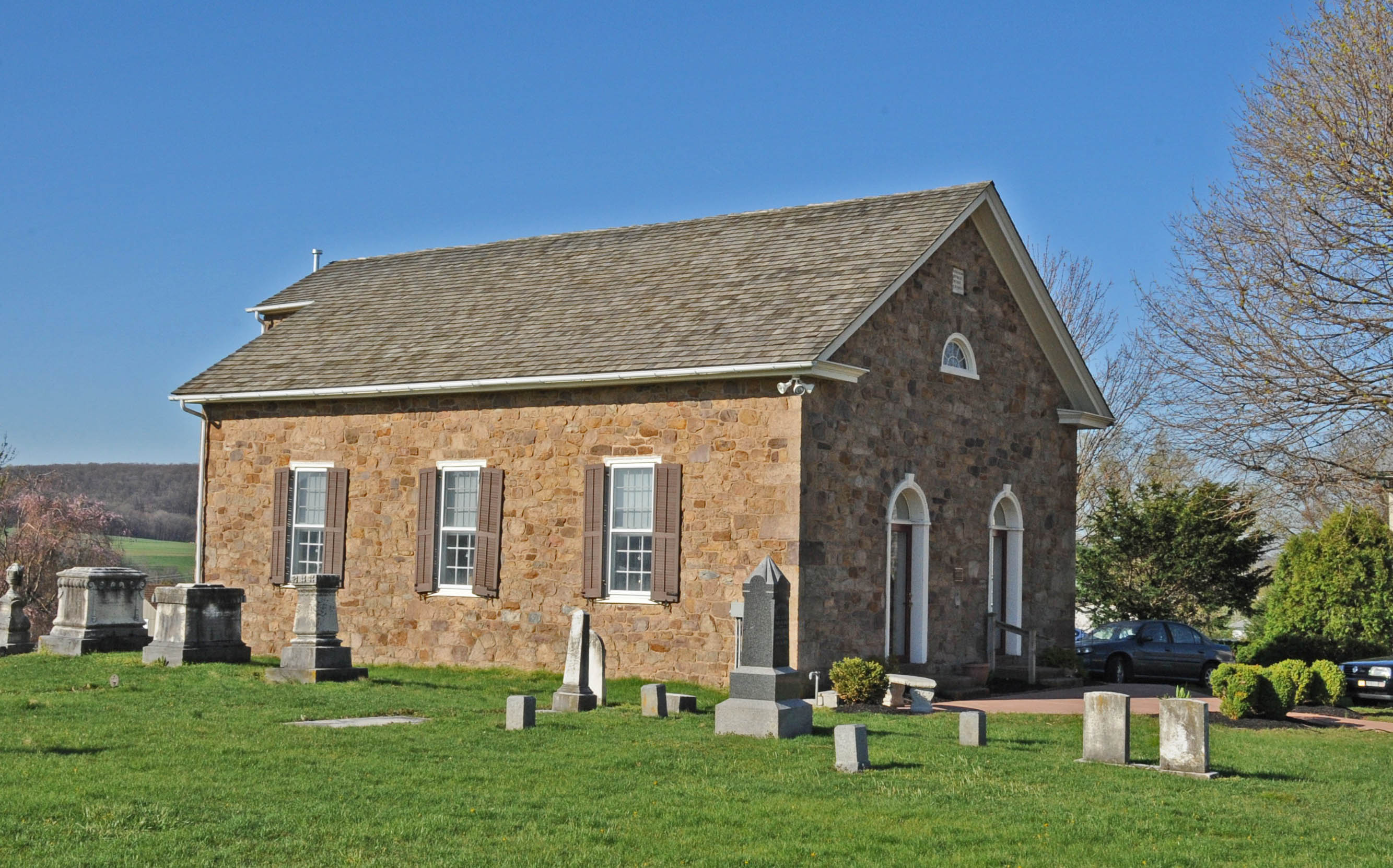
Caernarvon Presbyterian Church

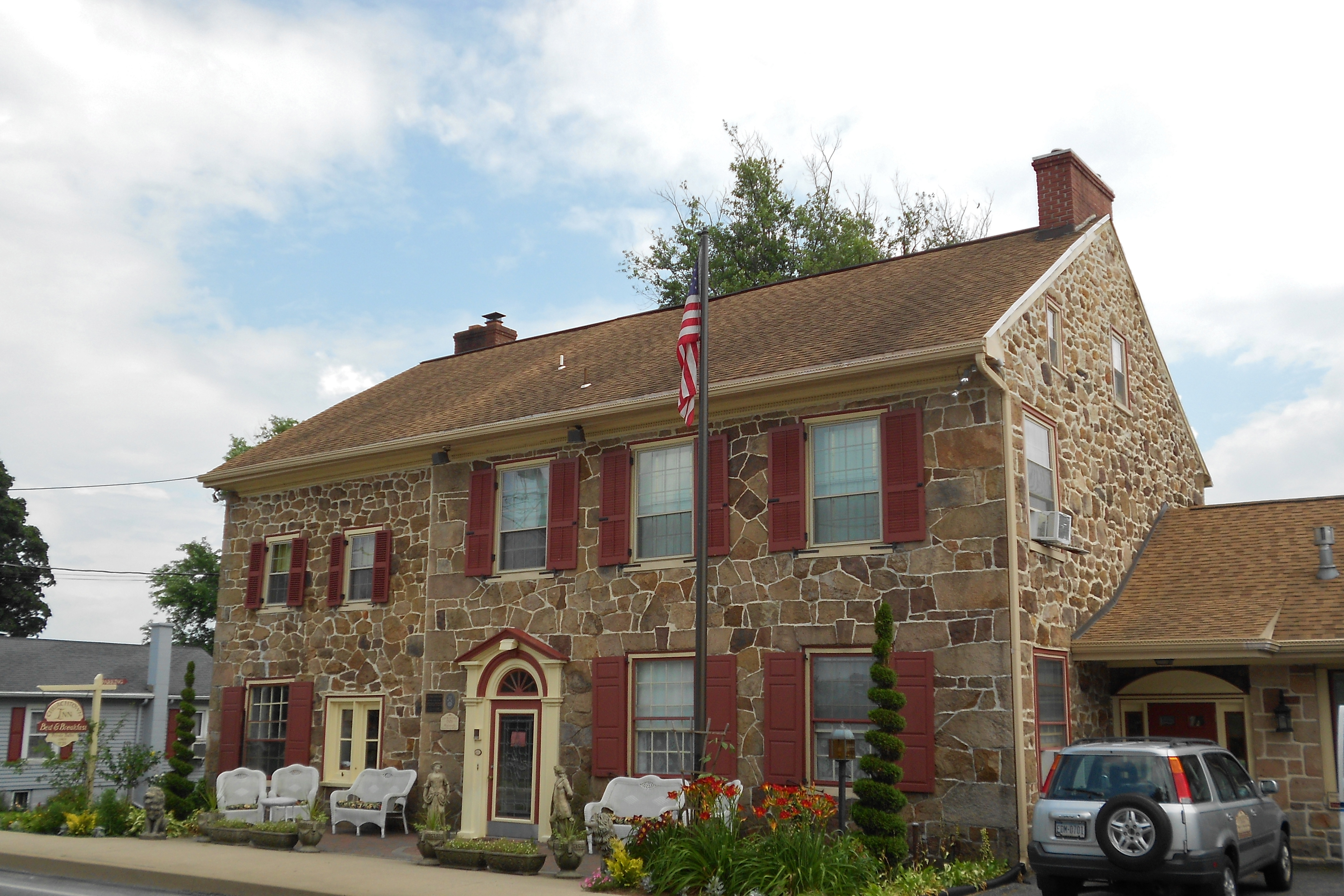
Edward Davies House

== Demographics ==
Historical population
Census	Pop.	Note	%±
2020	417		—
U.S. Decennial Census
