= William Davie House =

William Davie House may refer to:

- William Davie House (American Falls, Idaho), listed on the National Register of Historic Places (NRHP) in Power County
- William R. Davie House, Halifax, North Carolina, NRHP-listed in Halifax County

== See also ==
- Davies House (disambiguation)
