= Bangor Episcopal Church =

Church in Pennsylvania, United States

- U.S. National Register of Historic Places
- U.S. Historic district
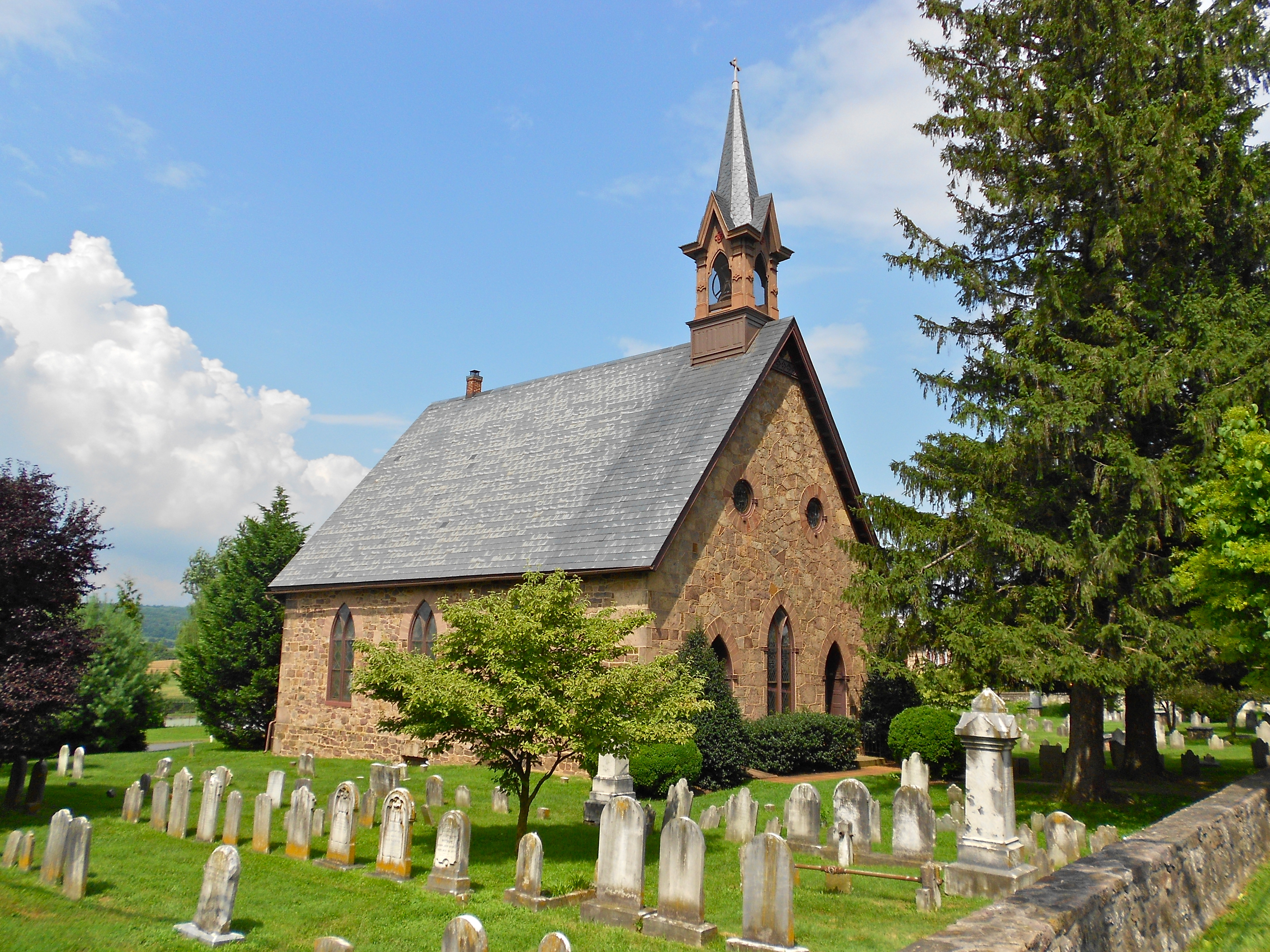
- Bangor Episcopal Church, July 2013

- Location within Pennsylvania Location within the United States
- Location: Northwestern corner of Main and Water Streets, Churchtown, Caernarvon Township, Pennsylvania
- Coordinates: 40°8′1″N 75°57′42″W
- Area: less than one acre
- Built: 1830, 1844, c. 1880
- Architectural style: Greek Revival, Gothic Revival
- NRHP reference No.: 87000664
- Added to NRHP: April 30, 1987

Bangor Episcopal Church is a historic Episcopal church complex located at Churchtown, in Caernarvon Township, Lancaster County, Pennsylvania. The church was built in 1830, and is a 1 1/2-story, brownstone rectangular building in the Gothic Revival style. It has a steep, slate covered gable roof and steeple added about 1880. It features Gothic arch art glass windows. The complex includes the frame school building. It is a one-story, three bay building built in 1844 in the Greek Revival style. Also on the property is a contributing cemetery with approximately 325 graves dated from the Revolutionary War to the present.

It was listed on the National Register of Historic Places in 1978.

== Gallery ==
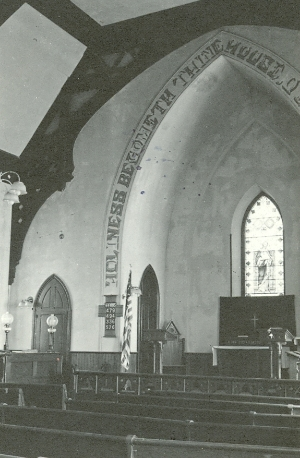
Interior in 1946

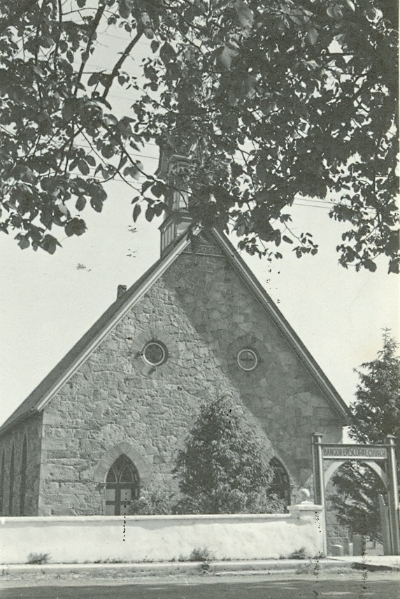
Exterior in 1946

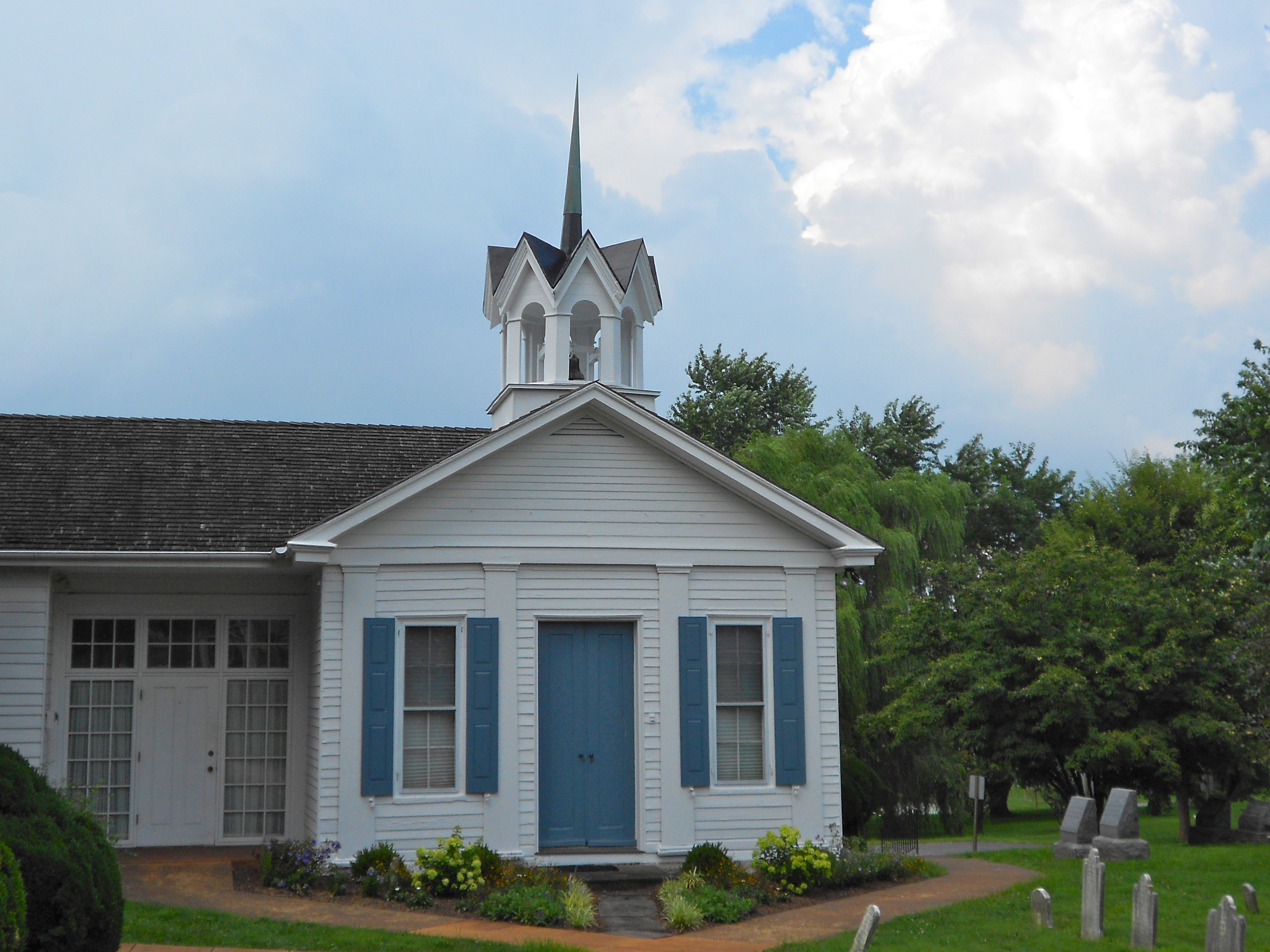
Church school building
