= Koen, Colorado =

Unincorporated community in Prowers County, CO, USA

Coordinates: 38°04′17″N 102°20′49″W

Koen is an unincorporated community in Prowers County, Colorado, United States.

== History ==
The community was named after Festus B. Koen, who was credited with irrigating the site.
