= Ann Cunningham Evans House =

Historic house in Pennsylvania, United States

- U.S. National Register of Historic Places
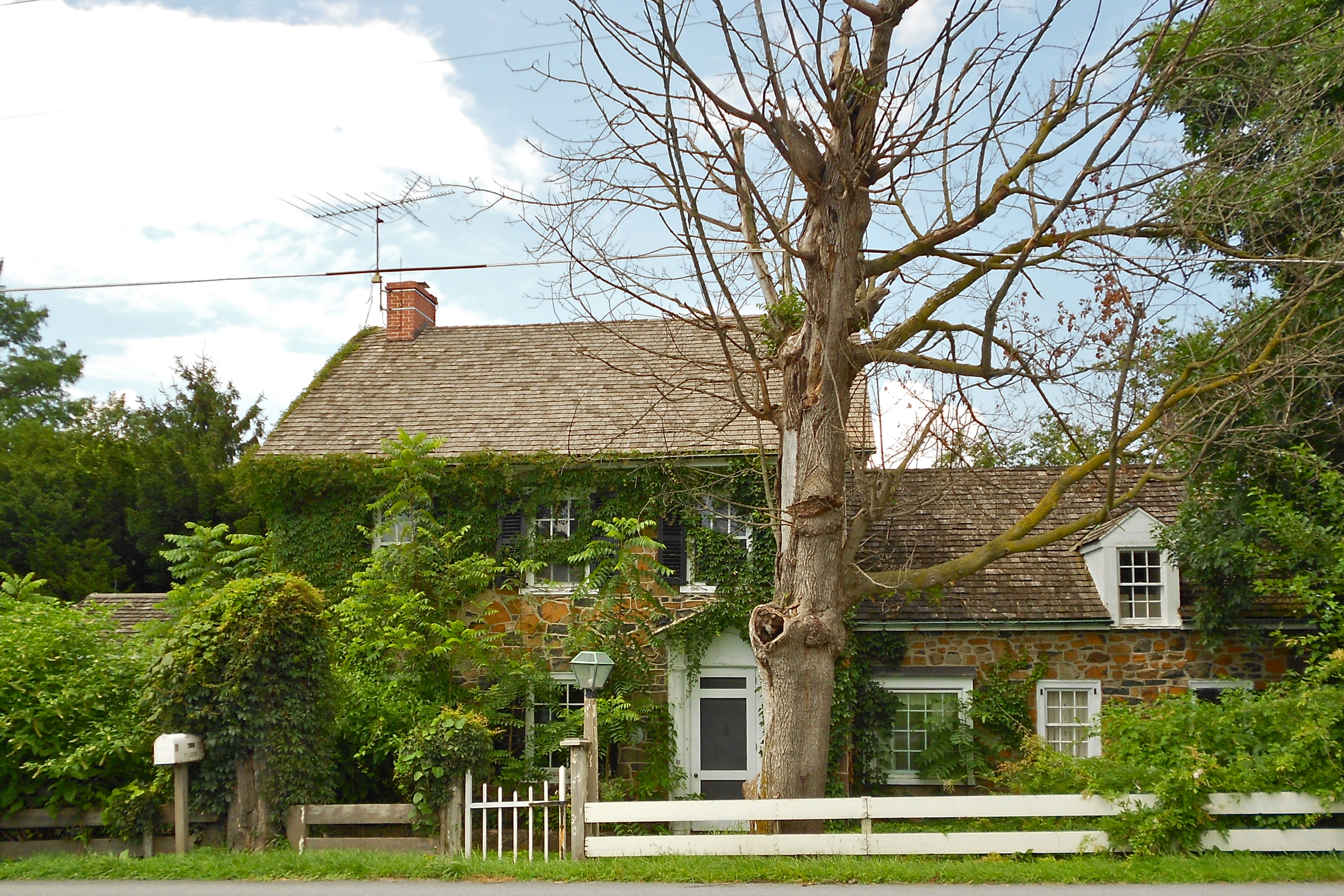

- Location within Pennsylvania Location within the United States
- Location: 6132 Twenty-eighth Division Hwy., Caernarvon Township, Pennsylvania
- Coordinates: 40°6′44″N 75°59′0″W
- Area: 1.1 acres (0.45 ha)
- Built: 1814
- Architectural style: Federal
- NRHP reference No.: 02000475
- Added to NRHP: May 9, 2002

Ann Cunningham Evans House is a historic home located at Caernarvon Township in Lancaster County, Pennsylvania. It was built about 1814, and is a 2 1/2-story, three-bay stone dwelling with a gable roof in the Federal style. It has a two-story rear ell (c. 1814), sun porch (c. 1930), and 1 1/2-story garage / kitchen addition (1950 / 1951).

It was listed on the National Register of Historic Places in 2002.
