= Carlton, Colorado =

Unincorporated community in Prowers County, CO, USA

- Unincorporated community
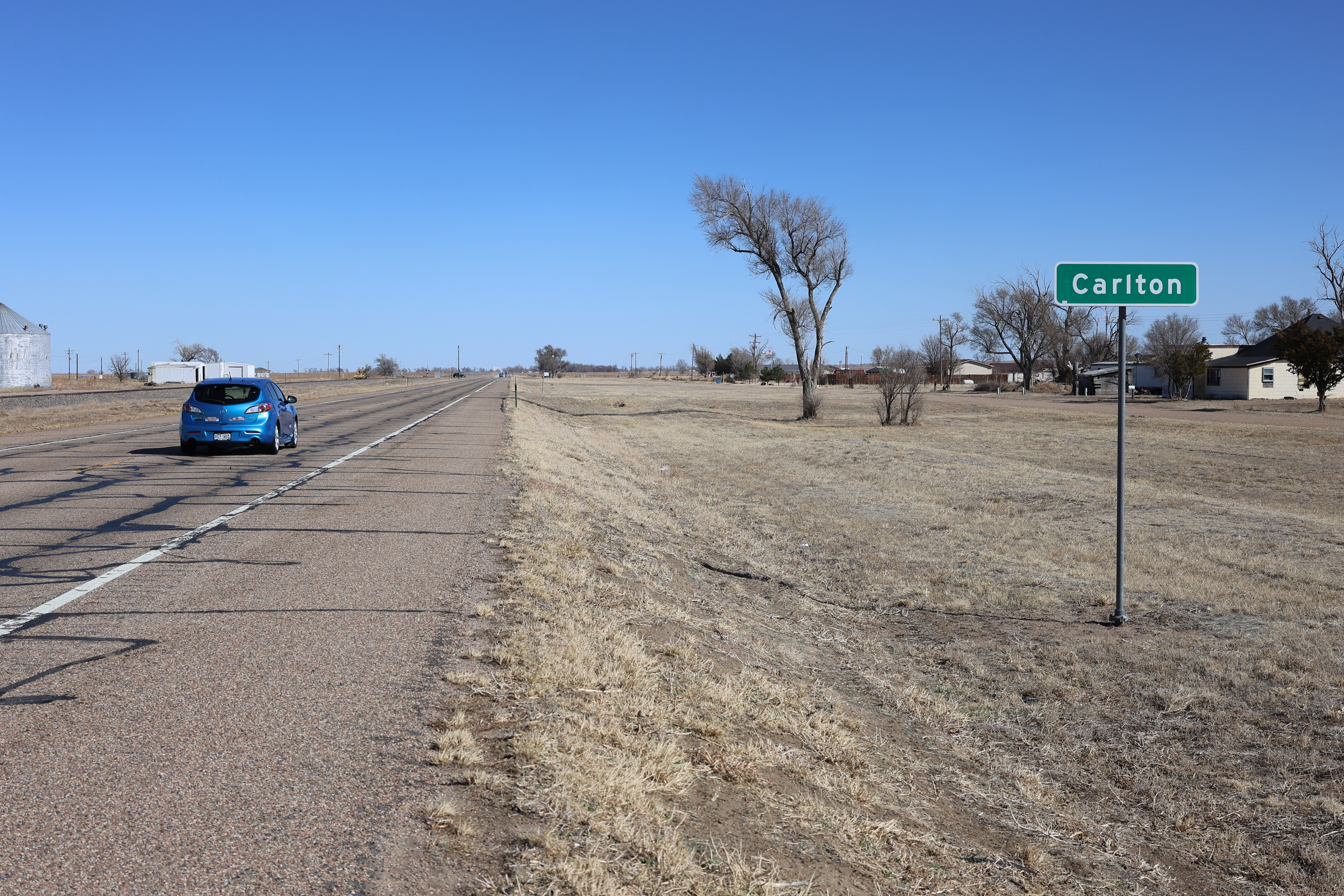
- Looking southeast in Carlton along U.S. Highway 50 (2024)

- Location of Carlton, Colorado. Carlton (Colorado)
- Coordinates: 38°05′05″N 102°25′11″W
- Country: United States
- State: Colorado
- County: Prowers

Government
  - Type: Unincorporated community
  - Body: Prowers County
- Elevation: 3,537 ft (1,078 m)
- Time zone: UTC−07:00 (MST)
  - Summer (DST): UTC−06:00 (MDT)
- ZIP code: 81052 (Lamar, Colorado)
- Area code: 719
- GNIS pop ID: 1989091

Carlton is an unincorporated community in Prowers County, Colorado, United States. It sits at an elevation of, 3,537 feet (1,078 meters).

== History ==
The Carlton, Colorado, post office operated from January 14, 1891, until March 5, 1960.

== See also ==
- List of populated places in Colorado
