= Beartown, Lancaster County, Pennsylvania =

Unincorporated community in Pennsylvania, US

Beartown, Pennsylvania
- Unincorporated community
- Location within Pennsylvania Location within the United States
- Coordinates: 40°6′41″N 75°58′39″W
- Country: United States
- State: Pennsylvania
- County: Lancaster
- Township: Caernarvon
- Elevation: 558 ft (170 m)
- Time zone: UTC-5 (Eastern (EST))
  - Summer (DST): UTC-4 (EDT)
- ZIP code: 17555
- Area code: 717
- GNIS feature ID: 1168976

Beartown is an unincorporated community in Caernarvon Township in Lancaster County, Pennsylvania, United States. Beartown is located at the intersection of U.S. Route 322 and Pool Forge Road/Narvon Road.
