= Narvon, Pennsylvania =

Unincorporated community in Pennsylvania, US

- Unincorporated community
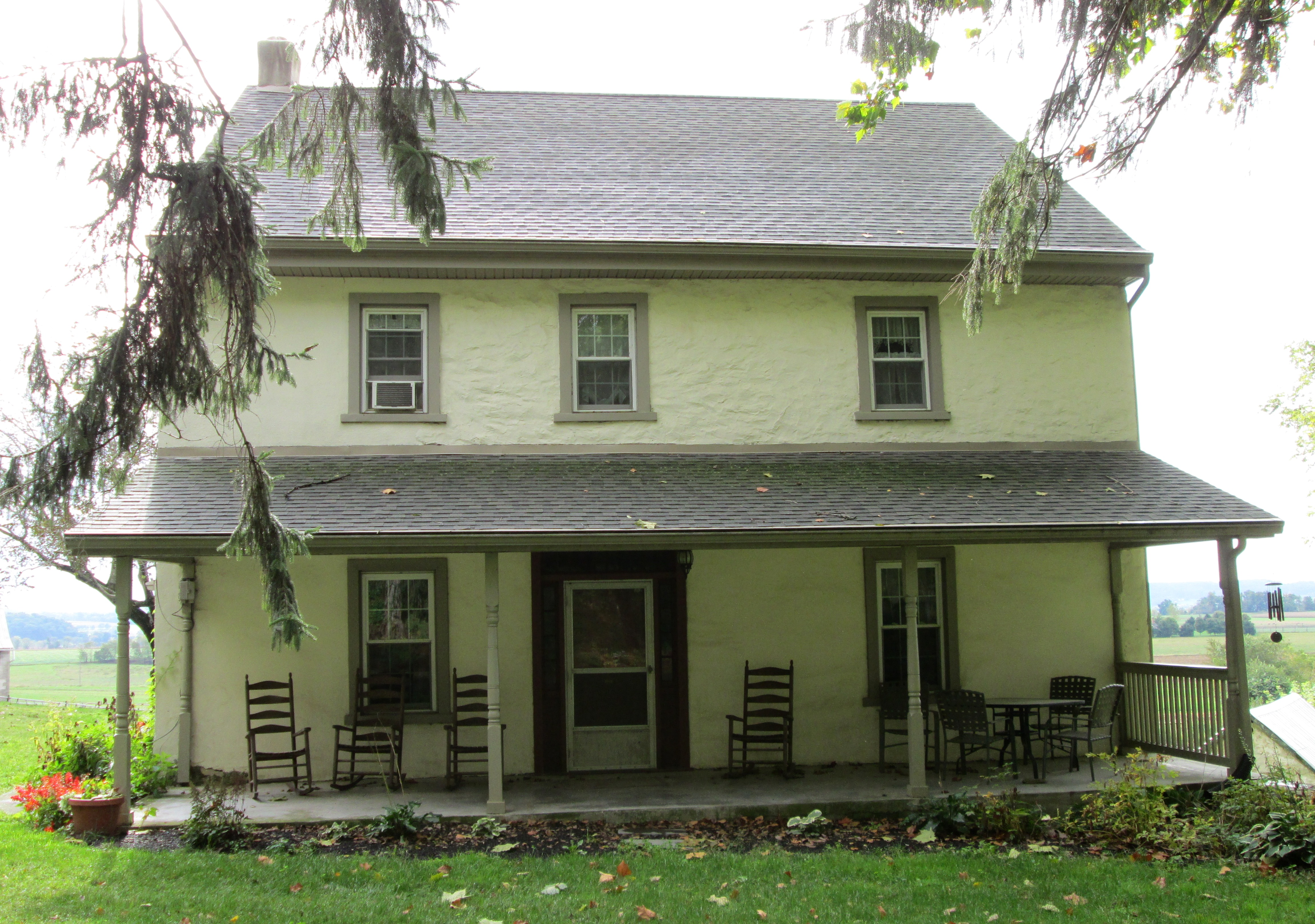
- A 1760s farmhouse in Narvon

- Location in Pennsylvania Location in the United States
- Coordinates: 40°6′10″N 75°58′40″W
- Country: United States
- State: Pennsylvania
- County: Lancaster
- Township: Caernarvon
- Elevation: 771 ft (235 m)

Population (2010)
  - Total: 62
- Time zone: UTC-5 (Eastern (EST))
  - Summer (DST): UTC-4 (EDT)
- ZIP code: 17555
- Area code: 717
- GNIS feature ID: 1204257

Narvon is an unincorporated community in Caernarvon Township in Lancaster County, Pennsylvania, United States. It has a sizeable Amish population.

== Climate ==
The climate in this area is characterized by hot, humid summers and generally mild to cool winters. According to the Köppen Climate Classification system, Narvon has a humid subtropical climate, abbreviated "Cfa" on climate maps.
