= Prowers County Welfare Housing =

- Prowers Country Welfare Housing
- U.S. National Register of Historic Places
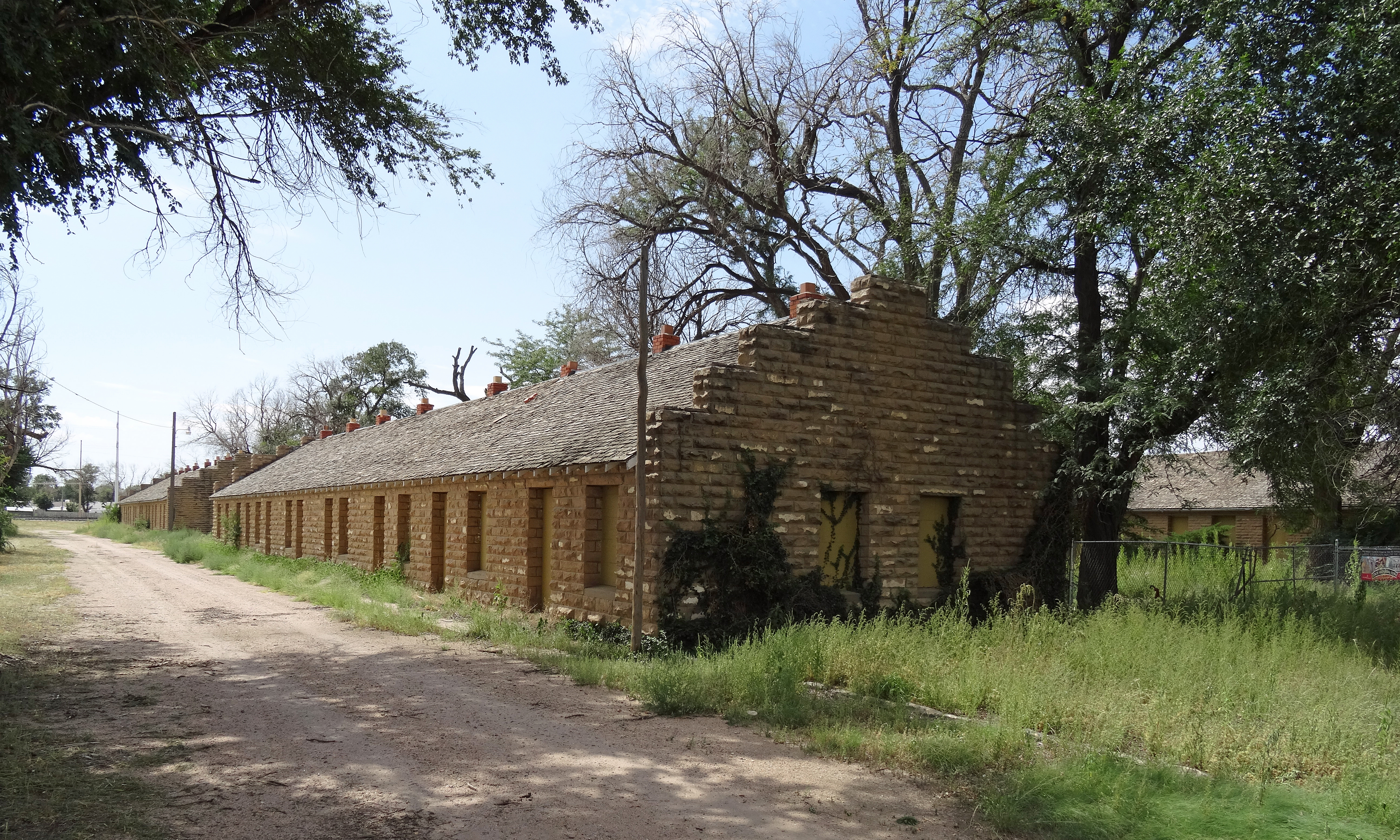

- Location within Colorado
- Location: 800 E. Maple St., Lamar, Colorado
- Coordinates: 38°05′33″N 102°36′38″W
- Area: 1.6 acres (0.65 ha)
- Built: 1938-41
- Built by: Works Progress Administration
- Architectural style: Late 19th And 20th Century Revivals, WPA Rustic
- MPS: New Deal Resources on Colorado's Eastern Plains MPS
- NRHP reference No.: 09001121
- Added to NRHP: December 22, 2009

Prowers Country Welfare Housing is a complex of five buildings constructed by the Works Progress Administration in 1938–41. It was listed on the National Register of Historic Places in 2009.

The five are one-story buildings arranged in an "H" pattern, with the center one being 52 by 25 feet (15.8 m × 7.6 m) in plan and the other four being 128 by 28 feet (39.0 m × 8.5 m). They are built of sandstone with stepped gable ends.

They were deemed significant for their association with the New Deal, and also for their WPA Rustic architecture. According to Colorado Preservation, they serve as "an excellent example of the WPA Rustic Style. Rustic characteristics featured in the buildings include the use of native stone, traditional construction methods, evident hand craftsmanship, and simple, functional design. The rustic design originated with the National Park Service emphasized the use of native materials and adaptation of indigenous or frontier methods of construction. This design philosophy was an ideal fit with the WPA. The goal of these programs was employment, so the majority of costs were to be spent on labor. Native materials were used because they were usually the least expensive. Traditional construction methods were used to save the expensive of power tools and large machinery and because they provided more employment. Both rustic architecture and federal relief buildings were meant to be simple and functional."

Besides the five contributing buildings, the listing also included a contributing structure.
