= Charles E. Davies House =

Historic house in Utah, United States

- U.S. National Register of Historic Places
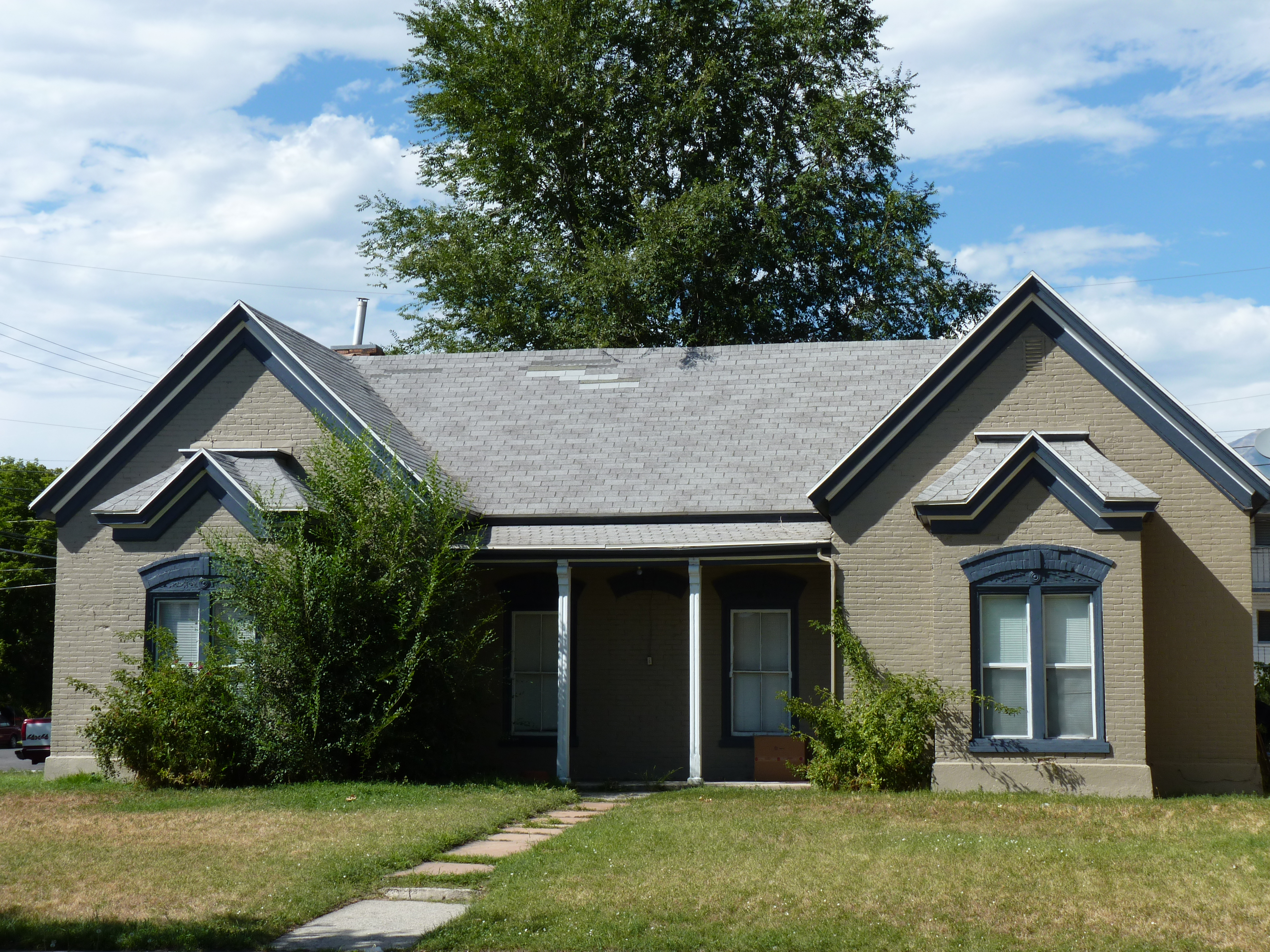
- Charles E. Davies House

- Location within Utah Location within the United States
- Interactive map showing the location of Charles E. Davies House
- Location: 388 West 300 North South; Provo, Utah
- Coordinates: 40°14′17″N 111°39′52″W
- Area: less than one acre
- Built: c.1885
- Architectural style: Greek Revival
- NRHP reference No.: 82004173
- Added to NRHP: August 4, 1982

The Charles E. Davies House is a historic house located in Provo, Utah. It is listed on the National Register of Historic Places. It is currently a private residence.

== Charles E. Davies House * 388 West 300 North * Provo, Utah ==
The Charles Davies House was built about 1885. “The house, a double-gable H-plan type, is the only example of the H-plan in Provo and its distinctive Victorian bay windows make it one of the best examples of such houses in the state (Historic Provo p. 8).” The Charles E. Davies House was designated to the Provo City Historic Landmarks Registry on March 7, 1996.

=== History of House Ownership ===
David L. Van Wagenen purchased the home in 1907 from Charles E. Davies, and continued to live there until 1922, even after he sold it in 1912. The house then passed to Eliza Smith Stewart, and then to Thomas Callister in the year 1918. In 1920, the title passed to Georgianna Parry in 1920, who sold the house three years later to Clyde Bunnell. The Bunnells retained the home until 1929, when the property was attained by Ray Barrett. Madeline Hales purchased the house in 1945, and the very same year sold it to Arthur S. Roberts. The title went to Clark S. Nelson in 1950, where it remained, until it was sold to Dr. Orlo Allen in 1956. Allen sold the home to Howard L. Jensen in 1960, who sold it to Louis B. Jones later that year.
