= Prowers County, Colorado =

County in Colorado, United States

- County
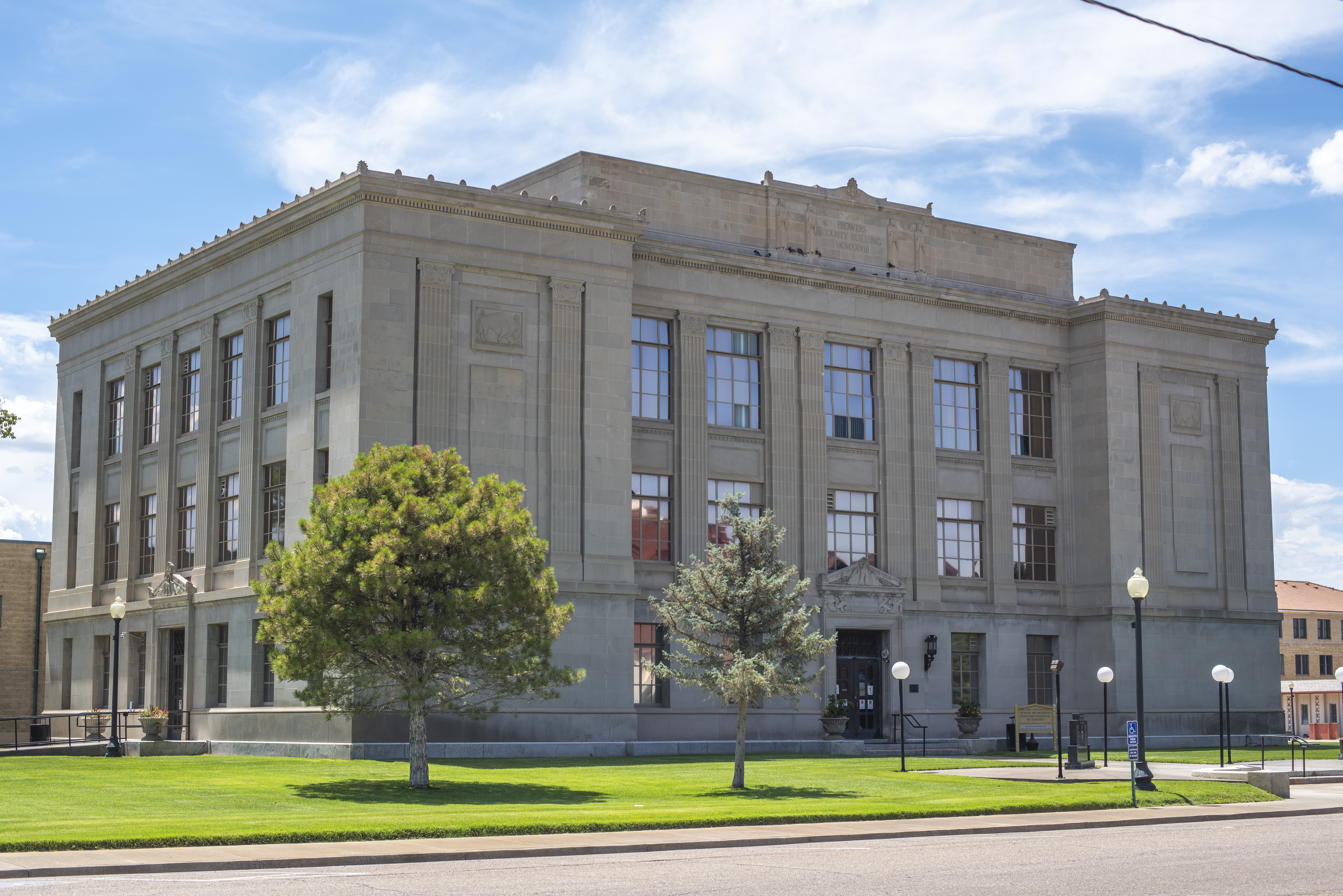
- Prowers County Courthouse in Lamar

- Location within the U.S. state of Colorado
- Coordinates: 37.96°N 102.40°W
- Country: United States
- State: Colorado
- Founded: April 11, 1889
- Named for: John Wesley Prowers
- Seat: Lamar
- Largest city: Lamar

Area
  - Total: 1,644 sq mi (4,260 km^{2})
  - Land: 1,638 sq mi (4,240 km^{2})
  - Water: 5.9 sq mi (15 km^{2}) 0.4%

Population (2020)
  - Total: 11,999
  - Estimate (2025): 11,884 ▼
  - Density: 7.325/sq mi (2.828/km^{2})
- Time zone: UTC−7 (Mountain)
  - Summer (DST): UTC−6 (MDT)
- Congressional district: 4th
- Website: www.prowersco.gov

Prowers County is a county located in the U.S. state of Colorado. As of the 2020 census, the population was 11,999. The county seat is Lamar. The county is named in honor of John Wesley Prowers, a leading pioneer in the lower Arkansas River valley region.

== Geography ==
According to the U.S. Census Bureau, the county has a total area of 1,644 square miles (4,260 km^{2}), of which 1,638 square miles (4,240 km^{2}) is land and 5.9 square miles (15 km^{2}) (0.4%) is water.

=== Adjacent counties ===
- Kiowa County (north)
- Greeley County, Kansas (northeast)
- Hamilton County, Kansas (east)
- Stanton County, Kansas (southeast/Central Time border)
- Baca County (south)
- Bent County (west)

=== Major highways ===
- U.S. Highway 50
- U.S. Highway 287
- U.S. Highway 385
- U.S. Highway 400
- State Highway 89
- State Highway 196

=== Trails and byways ===
- American Discovery Trail
- Santa Fe Trail National Scenic Byway

=== Antipode ===
Prowers County is home of the Antipode of the Indian Ocean island of Île Amsterdam and that island's settlement, La Roche Godon, making it one of the few places in the continental United States with a non-oceanic antipode. The center of Ile Amsterdam is at 37.8332° S, 77.5505° E; the antipode, 37.8332° N and 102.4495° W is about 10 miles southeast of Lamar.

== Demographics ==
Historical population
Census	Pop.	Note	%±
1890	1,969		—
1900	3,766		91.3%
1910	9,520		152.8%
1920	13,845		45.4%
1930	14,762		6.6%
1940	12,304		−16.7%
1950	14,836		20.6%
1960	13,296		−10.4%
1970	13,258		−0.3%
1980	13,070		−1.4%
1990	13,347		2.1%
2000	14,483		8.5%
2010	12,551		−13.3%
2020	11,999		−4.4%
2025 (est.)	11,884	▼	−1.0%
U.S. Decennial Census; 1790-1960 1900-1990; 1990-2000 2010-2020

=== 2020 census ===
As of the 2020 census, the county had a population of 11,999. Of the residents, 25.3% were under the age of 18 and 18.2% were 65 years of age or older; the median age was 38.1 years. For every 100 females there were 97.7 males, and for every 100 females age 18 and over there were 95.7 males. 62.5% of residents lived in urban areas and 37.5% lived in rural areas.

Prowers County, Colorado – Racial and ethnic composition Note: the US Census treats Hispanic/Latino as an ethnic category. This table excludes Latinos from the racial categories and assigns them to a separate category. Hispanics/Latinos may be of any race.
Race / Ethnicity (NH = Non-Hispanic)	Pop 2000	Pop 2010	Pop 2020	% 2000	% 2010	% 2020
White alone (NH)	9,427	7,873	6,686	65.09%	62.73%	55.72%
Black or African American alone (NH)	35	54	83	0.24%	0.43%	0.69%
Native American or Alaska Native alone (NH)	76	65	118	0.52%	0.52%	0.98%
Asian alone (NH)	49	38	31	0.34%	0.30%	0.26%
Pacific Islander alone (NH)	1	2	6	0.01%	0.02%	0.05%
Other race alone (NH)	10	11	50	0.07%	0.09%	0.42%
Mixed race or Multiracial (NH)	119	91	345	0.82%	0.72%	2.88%
Hispanic or Latino (any race)	4,766	4,417	4,680	32.91%	35.19%	39.00%
Total	14,483	12,551	11,999	100.00%	100.00%	100.00%

The racial makeup of the county was 67.8% White, 0.9% Black or African American, 2.3% American Indian and Alaska Native, 0.3% Asian, 0.1% Native Hawaiian and Pacific Islander, 16.0% from some other race, and 12.8% from two or more races. Hispanic or Latino residents of any race comprised 39.0% of the population.

There were 4,730 households in the county, of which 32.3% had children under the age of 18 living with them and 28.4% had a female householder with no spouse or partner present. About 30.1% of all households were made up of individuals and 14.5% had someone living alone who was 65 years of age or older.

There were 5,437 housing units, of which 13.0% were vacant. Among occupied housing units, 66.6% were owner-occupied and 33.4% were renter-occupied. The homeowner vacancy rate was 1.2% and the rental vacancy rate was 6.9%.

=== 2010 census ===
At the 2010 census there were 12,551 people, 4,935 households, and 3,351 families living in the county. The population density was 7.6 people per square mile (2.9 people/km^{2}). There were 5,942 housing units at an average density of 3.6 units per square mile (1.4 units/km^{2}). The racial makeup of the county was 81.0% White, 0.5% Black or African American, 0.9% Native American, 0.3% Asian, 0.0% Pacific Islander, 14.7% from other races, and 2.6% from two or more races. 35.2% of the population were Hispanic or Latino of any race.

Of the 4,935 households 49.5% were married couples living together, 12.6% had a female householder with no husband present, and 32.1% were non-families. 28.3% of households were one person and 11.5% were one person aged 65 or older. The average household size was 2.48 and the average family size was 3.04.

The age distribution was 27.1% under the age of 18, 9.3% from 18 to 24, 22.7% from 25 to 44, 26.3% from 45 to 64, and 14.6% 65 or older. The median age was 36.7 years. For every 100 females there were 97.7 males. For every 100 females age 18 and over, there were 93.1 males.

The median household income was $33,969 and the median family income was $47,052. Males working full-time and year-round had a median income of $32,359 versus $28,727 for females. The per capita income for the county was $18,429. About 18.7% of families and 22.1% of the population were below the poverty line, including 30.8% of those under age 18 and 13.1% of those age 65 or over.

== Politics ==
Like all of the High Plains, Prowers County is majority Republican. It has only supported a Democrat in a presidential election seven times since its creation, the last one being Jimmy Carter in 1976. In 2024, Donald Trump received the highest percentage of the vote for any Republican in county history.

United States presidential election results for Prowers County, Colorado
Year	Republican		Democratic		Third party(ies)	
Year	No.	%	No.	%	No.	%
1892	229	49.25%	0	0.00%	236	50.75%
1896	304	34.78%	552	63.16%	18	2.06%
1900	769	53.11%	633	43.72%	46	3.18%
1904	1,155	64.20%	494	27.46%	150	8.34%
1908	1,430	53.14%	1,015	37.72%	246	9.14%
1912	928	29.05%	1,042	32.62%	1,224	38.32%
1916	1,683	40.48%	2,168	52.14%	307	7.38%
1920	2,650	65.00%	1,247	30.59%	180	4.42%
1924	2,564	59.21%	1,042	24.06%	724	16.72%
1928	3,228	71.50%	1,216	26.93%	71	1.57%
1932	2,568	44.85%	3,020	52.74%	138	2.41%
1936	2,432	43.91%	2,896	52.28%	211	3.81%
1940	3,115	56.87%	2,309	42.16%	53	0.97%
1944	2,796	58.71%	1,948	40.91%	18	0.38%
1948	2,505	49.63%	2,497	49.47%	45	0.89%
1952	3,978	65.13%	2,087	34.17%	43	0.70%
1956	3,350	57.61%	2,460	42.30%	5	0.09%
1960	3,567	59.15%	2,457	40.75%	6	0.10%
1964	2,044	35.11%	3,759	64.57%	19	0.33%
1968	2,741	49.07%	2,329	41.69%	516	9.24%
1972	3,272	61.58%	1,860	35.01%	181	3.41%
1976	2,578	46.13%	2,861	51.20%	149	2.67%
1980	3,115	59.77%	1,669	32.02%	428	8.21%
1984	3,501	68.71%	1,467	28.79%	127	2.49%
1988	2,978	56.34%	2,207	41.75%	101	1.91%
1992	2,371	44.10%	1,770	32.92%	1,236	22.99%
1996	2,504	53.83%	1,745	37.51%	403	8.66%
2000	3,026	66.89%	1,361	30.08%	137	3.03%
2004	3,392	71.49%	1,308	27.57%	45	0.95%
2008	3,043	65.94%	1,487	32.22%	85	1.84%
2012	3,230	66.42%	1,519	31.24%	114	2.34%
2016	3,531	70.39%	1,186	23.64%	299	5.96%
2020	4,008	72.07%	1,458	26.22%	95	1.71%
2024	3,833	74.50%	1,227	23.85%	85	1.65%

United States Senate election results for Prowers County, Colorado2
Year	Republican		Democratic		Third party(ies)	
Year	No.	%	No.	%	No.	%
2020	3,966	72.11%	1,435	26.09%	99	1.80%

United States Senate election results for Prowers County, Colorado3
Year	Republican		Democratic		Third party(ies)	
Year	No.	%	No.	%	No.	%
2022	2,956	69.11%	1,172	27.40%	149	3.48%

Colorado Gubernatorial election results for Prowers County
Year	Republican		Democratic		Third party(ies)	
Year	No.	%	No.	%	No.	%
2022	2,847	66.43%	1,139	26.57%	300	7.00%

== Education ==
Prowers County is served by four public school districts:

- Granada School District No. RE-1
- Lamar School District No. RE-2
- Holly School District No. RE-3
- Wiley School District

The county is also the home of Lamar Community College, which serves roughly 700 students annually.

== Health care ==
Prowers Medical Center in Lamar, a critical access hospital with 25 beds and a level IV trauma center, serves the county.

== Communities ==
=== City ===
- Lamar

=== Towns ===
- Granada
- Holly
- Wiley

=== Unincorporated communities ===
- Bristol
- Carlton
- Hartman
- Koen

== Historic sites ==
- Santa Fe National Historic Trail
- Amache National Historic Site
- Lamar station

== Gallery ==
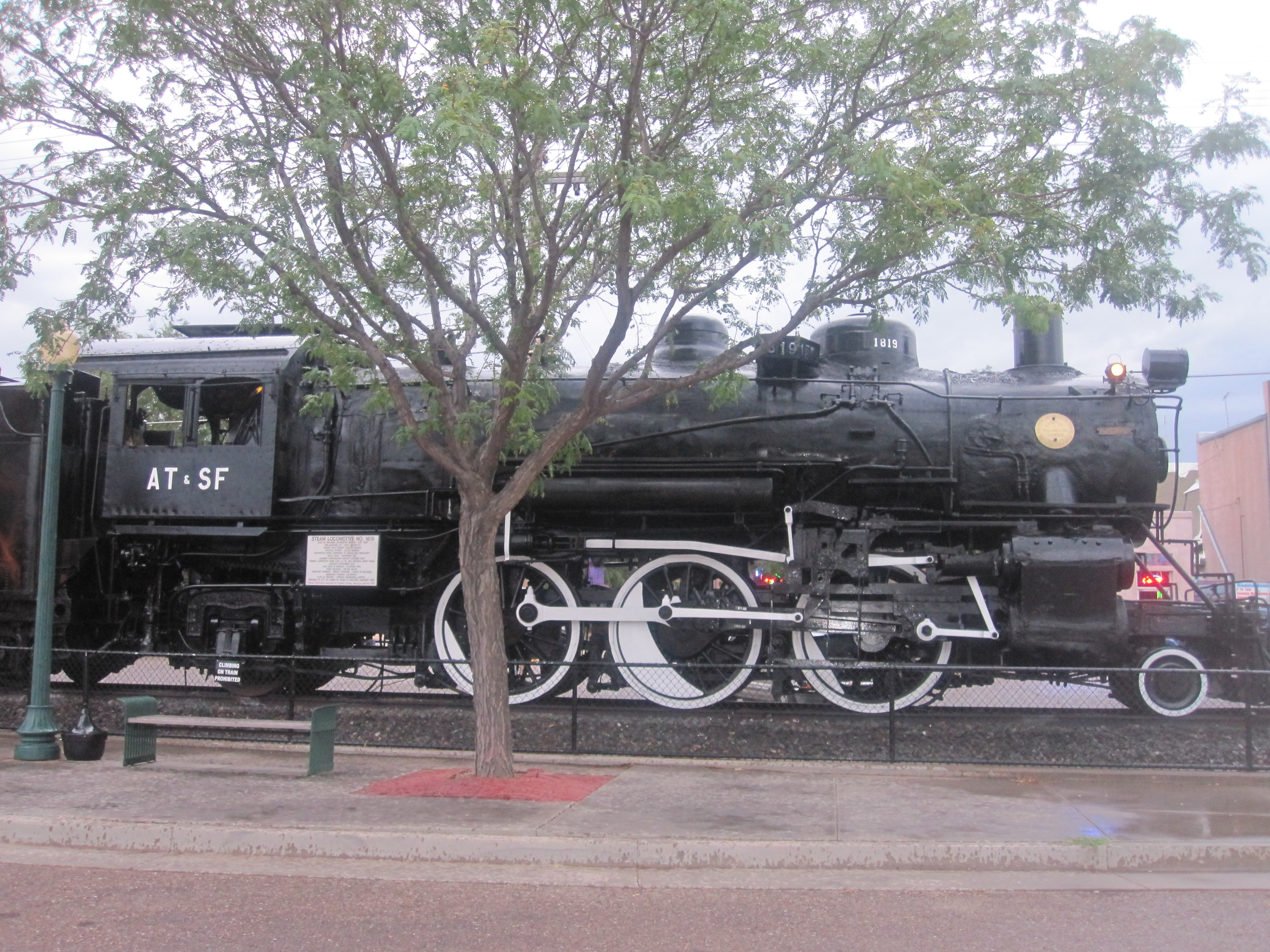
Former Atchison, Topeka, and Santa Fe railroad locomotive on display in Lamar

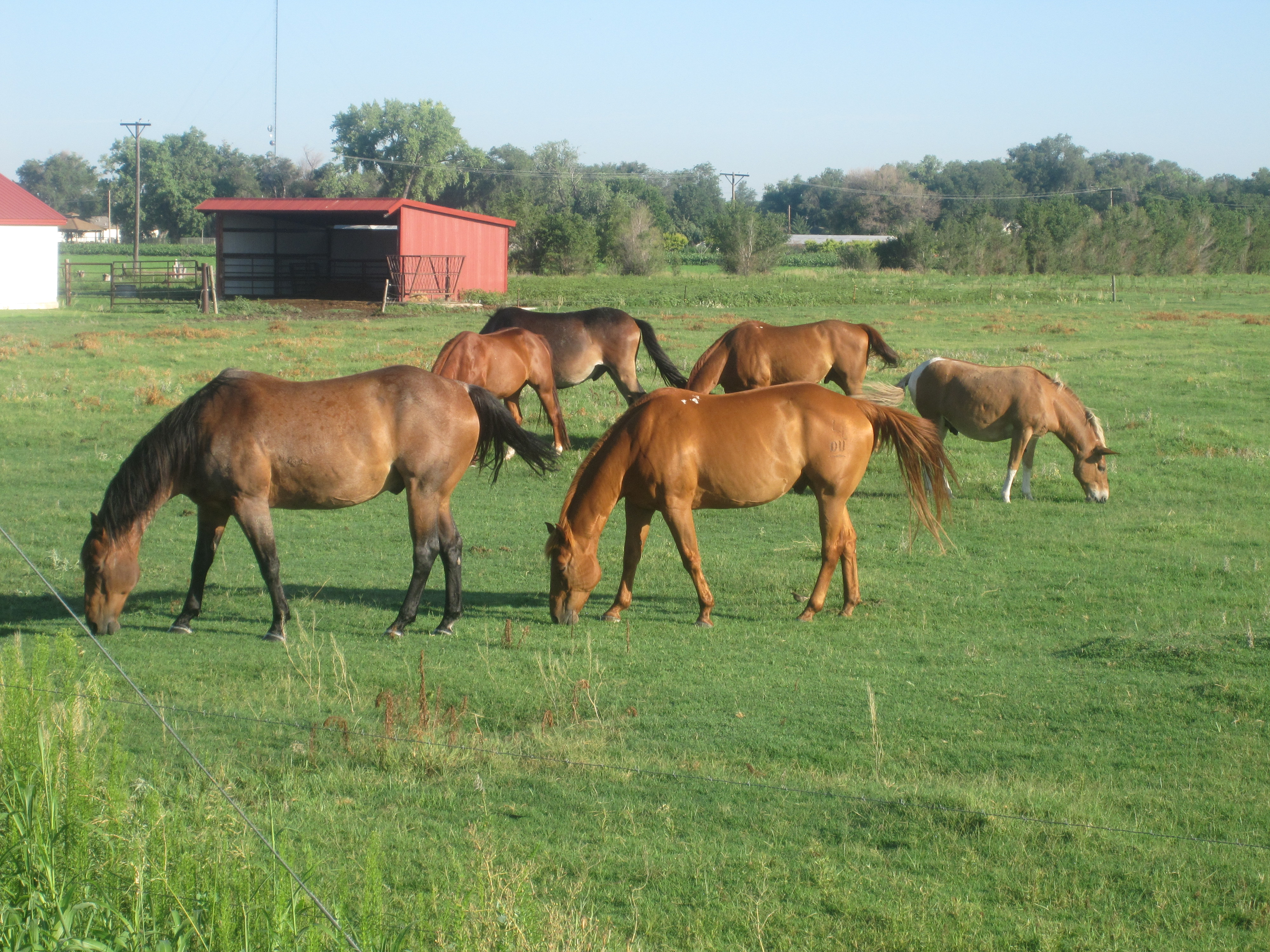
Horses grazing east of Holly in Prowers County

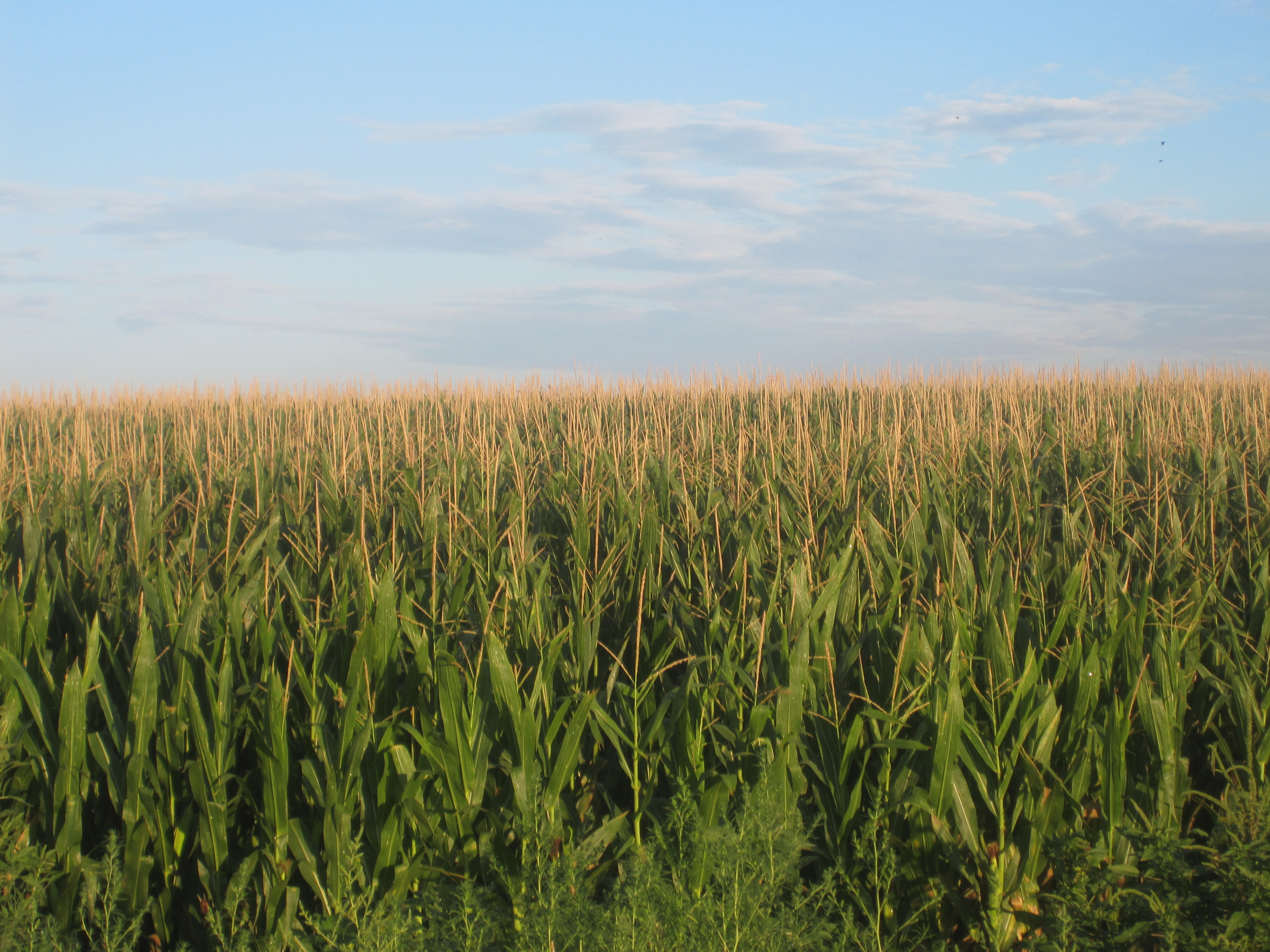
Cornfields flourish after a heavy rain in Prowers County, August 1, 2010

Area affected by 1930s Dust Bowl

== See also ==
- Bibliography of Colorado
- Geography of Colorado
- History of Colorado
  - National Register of Historic Places listings in Prowers County, Colorado
- Index of Colorado-related articles
- List of Colorado-related lists
  - List of counties in Colorado
- Outline of Colorado
