= Holly, Colorado =

Town in Colorado, United States

- Statutory Town
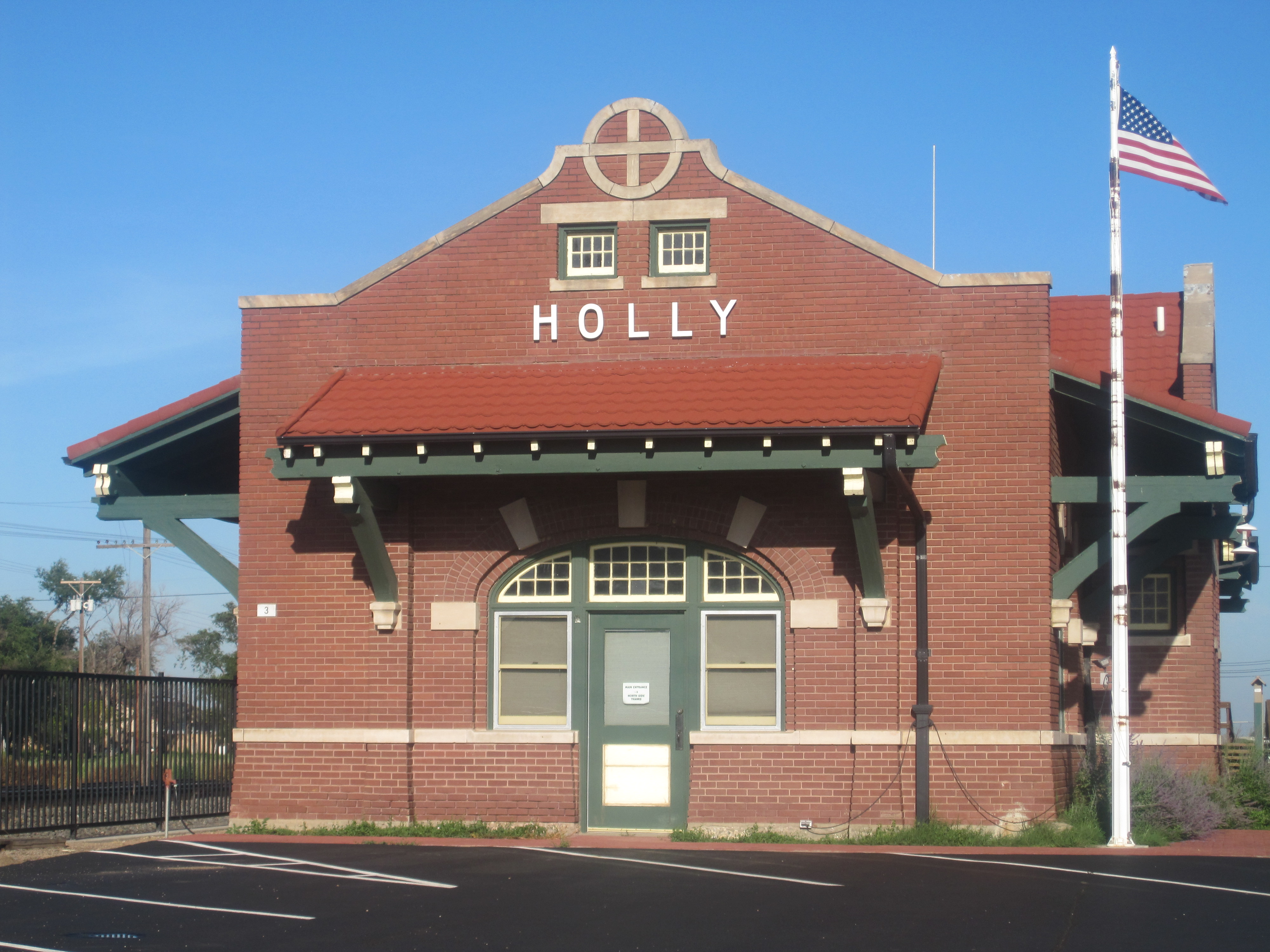
- Former Holly Santa Fe Depot, currently is town hall (2010)

- Location with Prowers County and Colorado
- Coordinates: 38°03′18″N 102°07′34″W
- Country: United States
- State: Colorado
- County: Prowers
- Incorporated: September 4, 1903

Area
  - Total: 0.7244 sq mi (1.8763 km^{2})
  - Land: 0.7234 sq mi (1.8737 km^{2})
  - Water: 0.0010 sq mi (0.0026 km^{2})
- Elevation: 3,396 ft (1,035 m)

Population (2020)
  - Total: 837
  - Density: 1,160/sq mi (447/km^{2})
- Time zone: UTC−7 (MST)
  - Summer (DST): UTC−6 (MDT)
- ZIP Code: 81047
- Area code: 719
- FIPS code: 08-37215
- GNIS ID: 2412764
- Website: www.townofhollyco.gov

Holly is a statutory town in Prowers County in southeastern Colorado, United States. The town is located 4.3 miles (6.9 km) west of the Kansas border at an elevation of 3,393 feet (1,034 m). Despite having the lowest elevation of any Colorado municipality, Holly is higher than the high points of 19 states and the District of Columbia. The town population was 837 at the 2020 United States census.

== History ==
=== Early history ===
Holly was settled as a ranching community, and the town was incorporated in 1903. The town was named for Hiram S. Holly, a local cattleman. Hiram S. Holly moved to the town in 1871, and brought 1,300 cattle with him. Holly's ranch, the SS Ranch or Double S Ranch, was the first settlement in the area. The Holly SS Ranch Barn, a stone barn built in 1879, survives and is listed on the National Register of Historic Places. The original stone ranch house also survives, nearby, but is not listed.

=== Holly Sugar ===
Holly Sugar was created in the town in 1905 just in time for the sugarbeet harvest that year. The production was so successful the company quickly looked to expand to other communities. By 1911, Holly Sugar had expanded outside the State of Colorado. The company has long since left the Holly community. In 1988, Holly Sugar merged with Imperial Sugar.

== Geography ==
At the 2020 United States census, the town had a total area of 463.6 acres (1.8763 km^{2}) including 0.64 acres (0.0026 km^{2}) of water.

=== Climate ===
The Köppen Climate system classifies the weather as semi-arid, abbreviated as BSk.

Climate data for Holly, Colorado (1991–2020 normals, extremes 1900–present)
Month	Jan	Feb	Mar	Apr	May	Jun	Jul	Aug	Sep	Oct	Nov	Dec	Year
Record high °F (°C)	79 (26)	88 (31)	96 (36)	99 (37)	107 (42)	111 (44)	110 (43)	109 (43)	105 (41)	97 (36)	90 (32)	81 (27)	111 (44)
Mean maximum °F (°C)	67.0 (19.4)	73.8 (23.2)	83.1 (28.4)	89.9 (32.2)	96.8 (36.0)	102.6 (39.2)	104.4 (40.2)	102.0 (38.9)	98.5 (36.9)	91.1 (32.8)	79.0 (26.1)	66.8 (19.3)	105.5 (40.8)
Mean daily maximum °F (°C)	45.7 (7.6)	49.7 (9.8)	60.2 (15.7)	68.3 (20.2)	77.9 (25.5)	89.1 (31.7)	93.4 (34.1)	90.6 (32.6)	83.1 (28.4)	70.5 (21.4)	57.0 (13.9)	46.2 (7.9)	69.3 (20.7)
Daily mean °F (°C)	30.5 (−0.8)	33.9 (1.1)	43.2 (6.2)	51.3 (10.7)	61.8 (16.6)	72.7 (22.6)	78.1 (25.6)	75.7 (24.3)	67.1 (19.5)	53.7 (12.1)	40.6 (4.8)	30.7 (−0.7)	53.3 (11.8)
Mean daily minimum °F (°C)	15.3 (−9.3)	18.1 (−7.7)	26.3 (−3.2)	34.3 (1.3)	45.8 (7.7)	56.2 (13.4)	62.7 (17.1)	60.9 (16.1)	51.0 (10.6)	36.9 (2.7)	24.2 (−4.3)	15.2 (−9.3)	37.2 (2.9)
Mean minimum °F (°C)	−1.4 (−18.6)	2.1 (−16.6)	10.0 (−12.2)	21.6 (−5.8)	31.5 (−0.3)	44.4 (6.9)	54.6 (12.6)	52.6 (11.4)	37.6 (3.1)	21.8 (−5.7)	7.9 (−13.4)	−1.5 (−18.6)	−7.7 (−22.1)
Record low °F (°C)	−28 (−33)	−25 (−32)	−22 (−30)	7 (−14)	10 (−12)	31 (−1)	40 (4)	38 (3)	19 (−7)	2 (−17)	−9 (−23)	−23 (−31)	−28 (−33)
Average precipitation inches (mm)	0.39 (9.9)	0.34 (8.6)	0.88 (22)	1.45 (37)	2.16 (55)	2.51 (64)	2.99 (76)	2.89 (73)	1.18 (30)	1.33 (34)	0.61 (15)	0.52 (13)	17.25 (438)
Average snowfall inches (cm)	4.2 (11)	3.4 (8.6)	4.7 (12)	1.4 (3.6)	0.7 (1.8)	0.0 (0.0)	0.0 (0.0)	0.0 (0.0)	0.0 (0.0)	1.0 (2.5)	3.2 (8.1)	2.9 (7.4)	21.5 (55)
Average precipitation days (≥ 0.01 in)	2.3	2.7	4.2	5.8	8.0	7.7	8.0	6.9	4.5	4.0	2.9	2.5	59.5
Average snowy days (≥ 0.1 in)	2.0	1.8	1.6	0.6	0.1	0.0	0.0	0.0	0.0	0.3	1.2	1.6	9.2
Source: NOAA

== Demographics ==
Historical population
Census	Pop.	Note	%±
1900	364		—
1910	724		98.9%
1920	940		29.8%
1930	971		3.3%
1940	864		−11.0%
1950	1,236		43.1%
1960	1,108		−10.4%
1970	993		−10.4%
1980	969		−2.4%
1990	877		−9.5%
2000	1,048		19.5%
2010	802		−23.5%
2020	837		4.4%
U.S. Decennial Census

As of the census of 2000, there were 1,048 people, 369 households, and 250 families residing in the town. The population density was 1,388.5 inhabitants per square mile (536.1/km^{2}). There were 449 housing units at an average density of 594.9 per square mile (229.7/km^{2}). The racial makeup of the town was 75.10% White, 0.38% Native American, 0.10% Asian, 23.66% from other races, and 0.76% from two or more races. Hispanic or Latino of any race were 35.97% of the population.

There were 369 households, out of which 39.0% had children under the age of 18 living with them, 54.5% were married couples living together, 8.7% had a female householder with no husband present, and 32.0% were non-families. 27.9% of all households were made up of individuals, and 16.3% had someone living alone who was 65 years of age or older. The average household size was 2.71 and the average family size was 3.36.

In the town, the population was spread out, with 32.0% under the age of 18, 8.4% from 18 to 24, 24.0% from 25 to 44, 19.8% from 45 to 64, and 15.8% who were 65 years of age or older. The median age was 34 years. For every 100 females, there were 103.1 males. For every 100 females age 18 and over, there were 91.2 males.

The median income for a household in the town was $24,917, and the median income for a family was $31,979. Males had a median income of $23,000 versus $21,250 for females. The per capita income for the town was $14,246. About 21.7% of families and 27.9% of the population were below the poverty line, including 37.5% of those under age 18 and 20.7% of those age 65 or over.

== Notable people ==
Holly is the hometown of Roy Romer who moved there as an infant from his birthplace of Garden City, Kansas. Romer served as the 39th Governor of Colorado from 1987 to 1999, and subsequently as the superintendent of the Los Angeles Unified School District from 2000 to 2006.

== Gallery ==
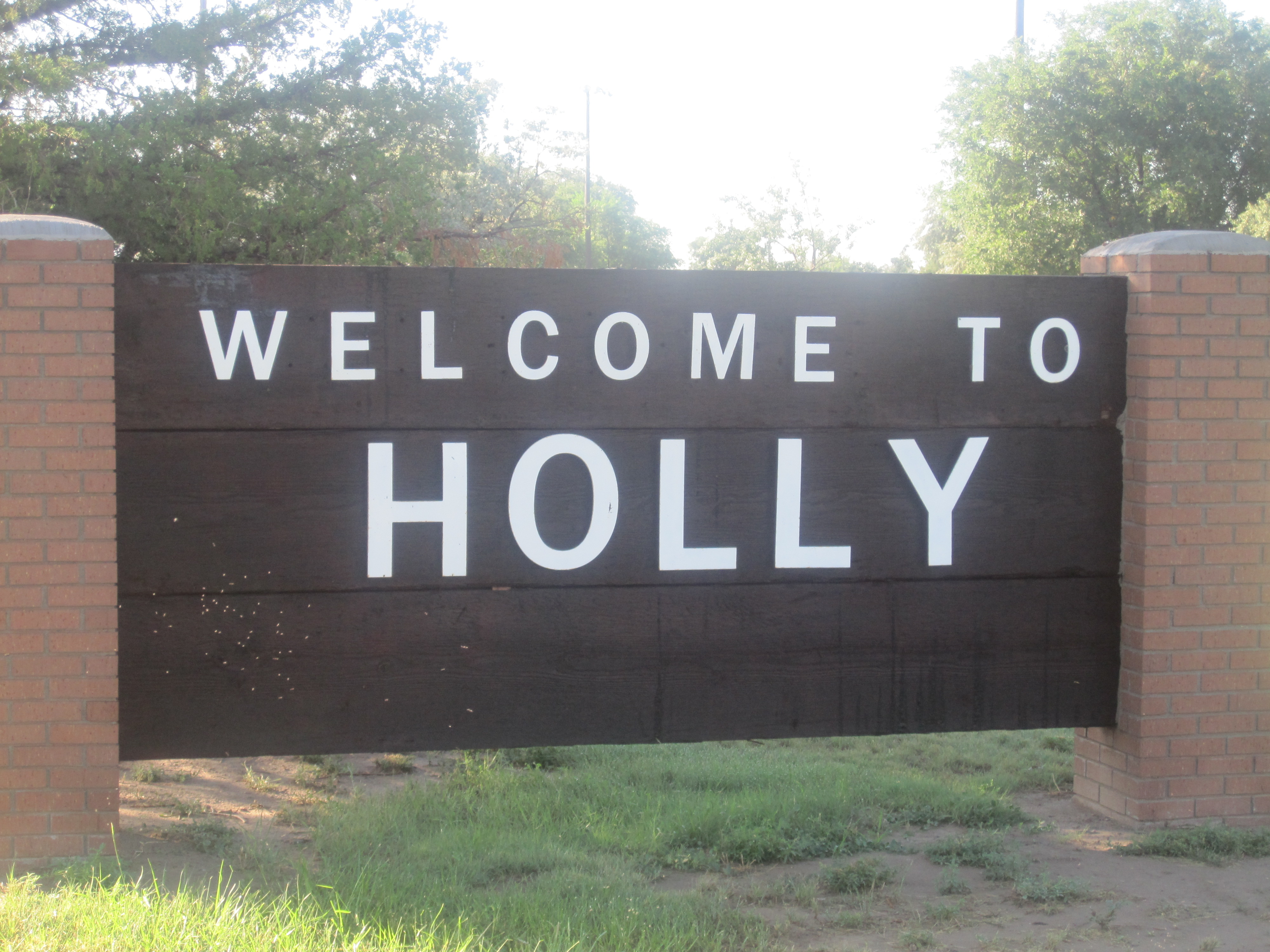
Holly welcome sign.

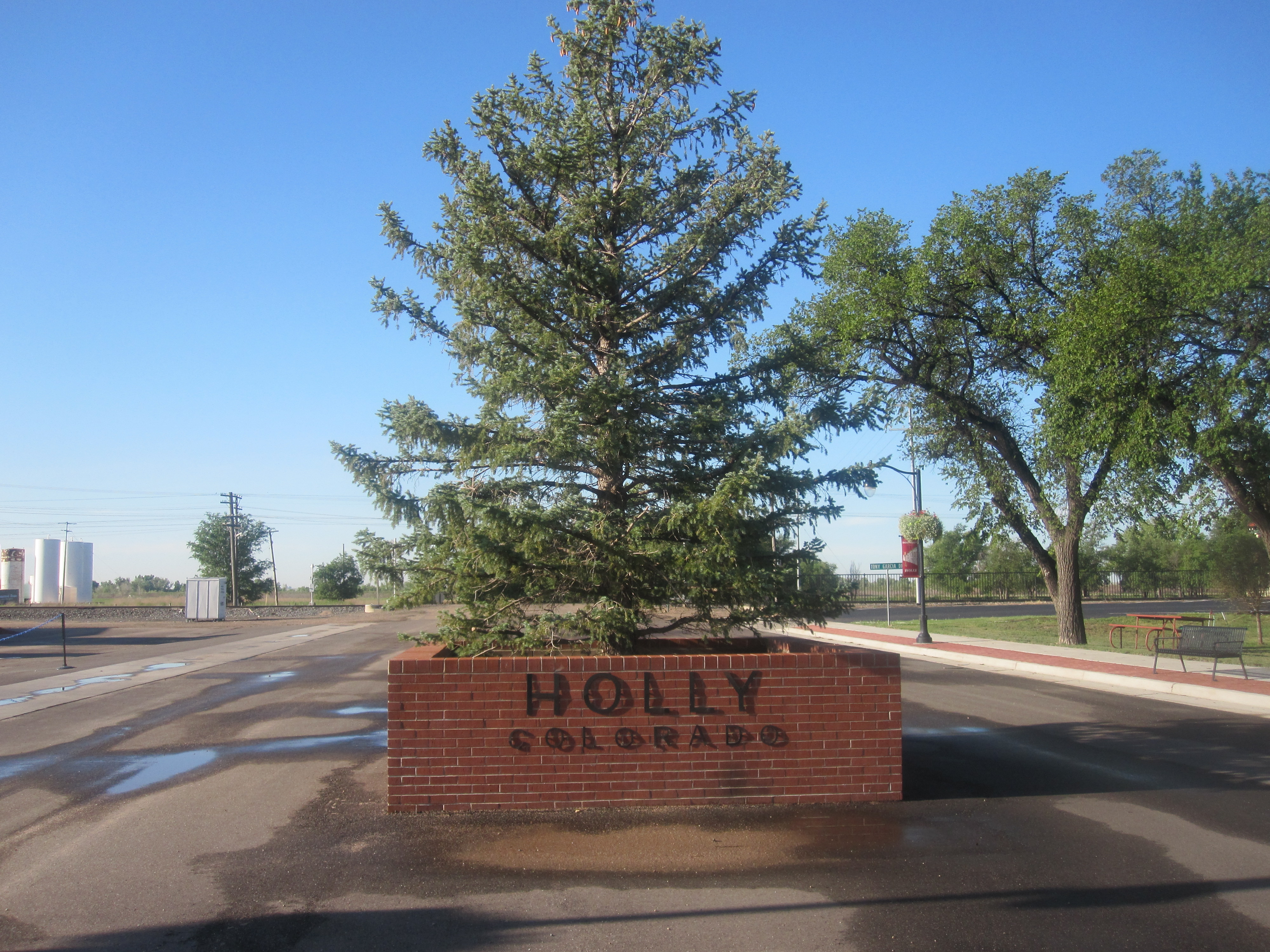
A spruce tree, not a holly tree, in Holly, Colorado.

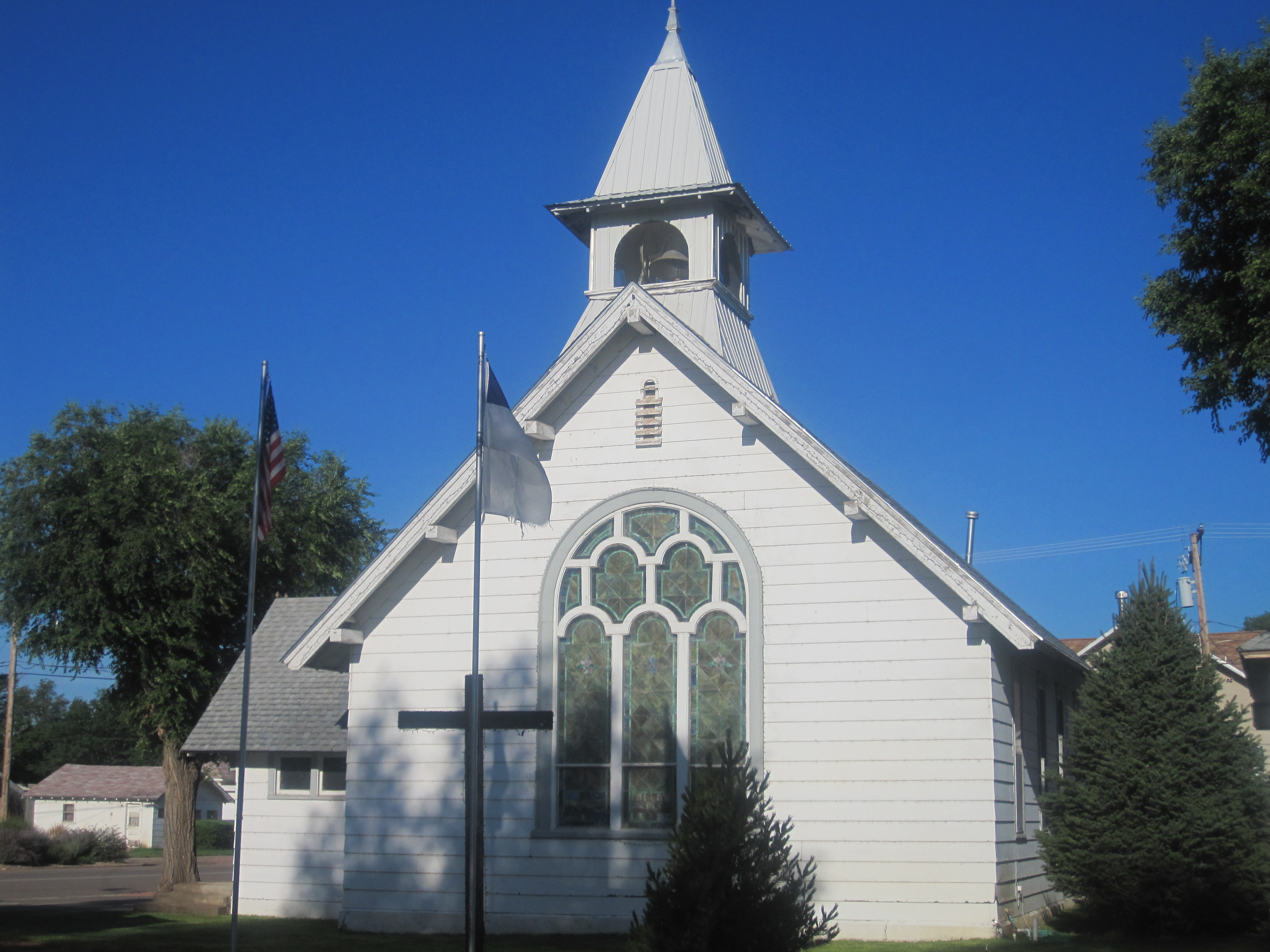
First Christian Church in Holly.

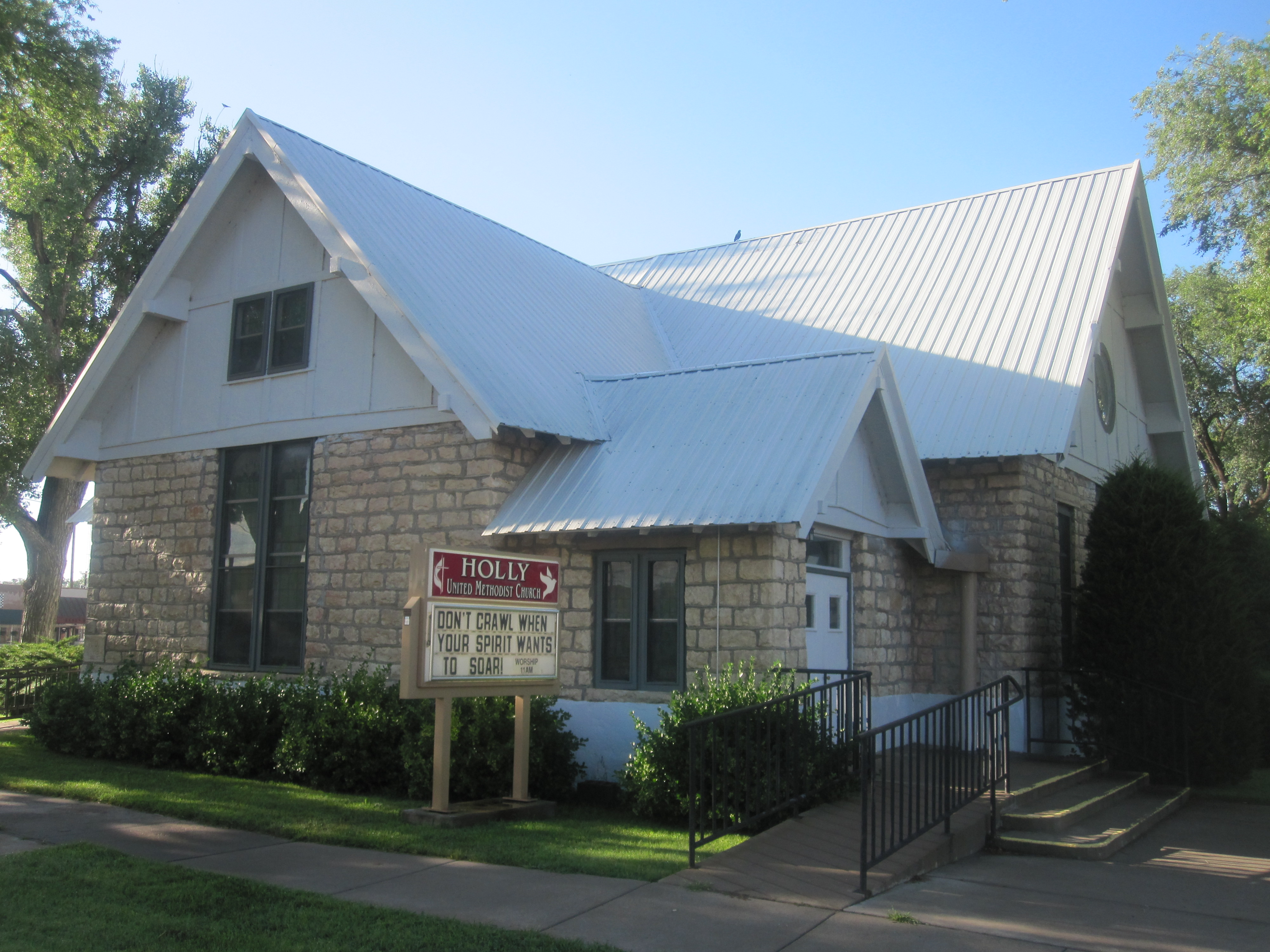
First United Methodist Church in Holly is located across the highway from First Christian Church.

== See also ==
- National Old Trails Road
- Santa Fe National Historic Trail
