= Caernarvon Township, Lancaster County, Pennsylvania =

Township in Pennsylvania, US

Coordinates: 40°08′13″N 75°57′29″W

- Township
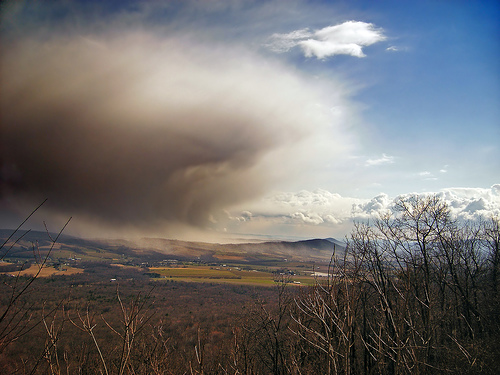
- A snow squall over Caernarvon Township

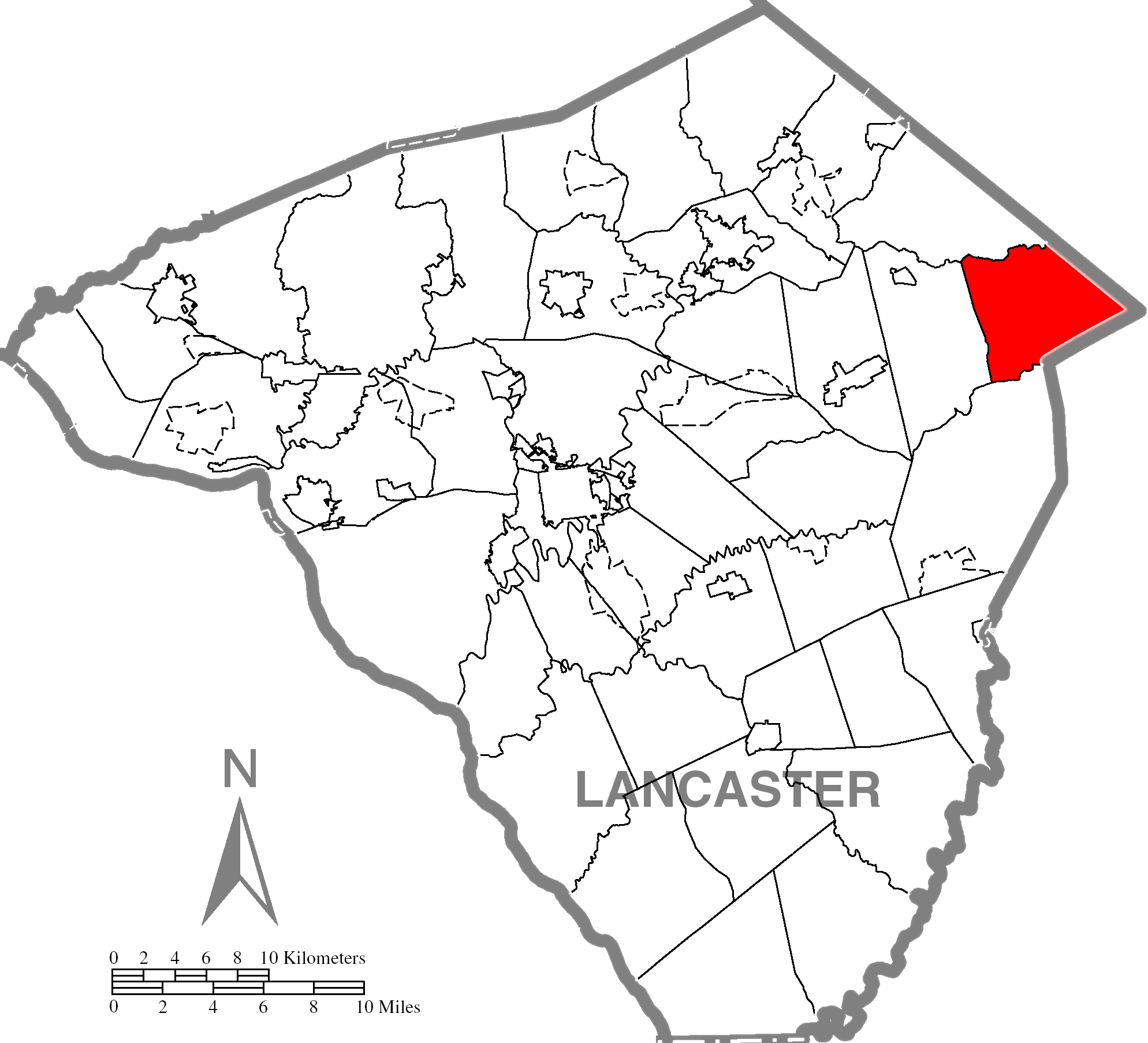
- Map of Lancaster County highlighting Caernarvon Township
- Country: United States
- State: Pennsylvania
- County: Lancaster
- Settled: 1730
- Incorporated: 1729

Government
  - Type: Board of Supervisors
  - Chairman: Gary Van Dyke
  - Member: Douglas Maitland
  - Member: Steve Nichols

Area
  - Total: 23.07 sq mi (59.76 km^{2})
  - Land: 22.96 sq mi (59.46 km^{2})
  - Water: 0.12 sq mi (0.30 km^{2})

Population (2020)
  - Total: 4,605 ▼
  - Estimate (2021): 4,591
  - Density: 209.4/sq mi (80.85/km^{2})
- Time zone: UTC-5 (Eastern (EST))
  - Summer (DST): UTC-4 (EDT)
- Area codes: 610, 717
- FIPS code: 42-071-10704
- Website: www.caernarvonlancaster.org

Caernarvon Township is a township in northeastern Lancaster County, Pennsylvania, United States. For the 2020 census, the population was 4,605.

== History ==
The Bangor Episcopal Church, Ann Cunningham Evans House, Edward Davies House, Pool Forge Covered Bridge, Poole Forge, Weaver's Mill Covered Bridge, and Windsor Forge Mansion are listed on the National Register of Historic Places.

Caernarvon Township is an anglicisation of Welsh name Caernarfon, Gwynedd. The name means "Castle on-to Mon" and is a historic castle city underneath Anglesey (Ynys Mon) where its name derives from.

== Geography ==
According to the United States Census Bureau, the township has a total area of 23.0 square miles (60 km^{2}), all land. It includes the communities of Churchtown, Beartown, Narvon, and part of Morgantown.

== Demographics ==
Historical population
Census	Pop.	Note	%±
1980	3,392		—
1990	3,946		16.3%
2000	4,278		8.4%
2010	4,748		11.0%
2020	4,605		−3.0%
2021 (est.)	4,591		−0.3%
U.S. Decennial Census

As of the census of 2000, there were 4,278 people, 1,269 households, and 1,079 families residing in the township. The population density was 186.2 inhabitants per square mile (71.9/km^{2}). There were 1,303 housing units at an average density of 56.7 per square mile (21.9/km^{2}). The racial makeup of the township was 98.90% White, 0.49% African American, 0.09% Native American, 0.26% Asian, 0.05% from other races, and 0.21% from two or more races. Hispanic or Latino of any race were 0.65% of the population.

There were 1,269 households, out of which 42.6% had children under the age of 18 living with them, 76.8% were married couples living together, 5.0% had a female householder with no husband present, and 14.9% were non-families. 12.1% of all households were made up of individuals, and 5.4% had someone living alone who was 65 years of age or older. The average household size was 3.27 and the average family size was 3.58.

In the township the population was spread out, with 31.9% under the age of 18, 9.1% from 18 to 24, 26.4% from 25 to 44, 21.6% from 45 to 64, and 11.1% who were 65 years of age or older. The median age was 33 years. For every 100 females, there were 98.1 males. For every 100 females age 18 and over, there were 95.2 males.

The median income for a household in the township was $47,905, and the median income for a family was $50,410. Males had a median income of $36,630 versus $21,250 for females. The per capita income for the township was $17,881. About 6.0% of families and 8.1% of the population were below the poverty line, including 12.2% of those under age 18 and 4.2% of those age 65 or over.
