= Holly SS Ranch Barn =

- U.S. National Register of Historic Places
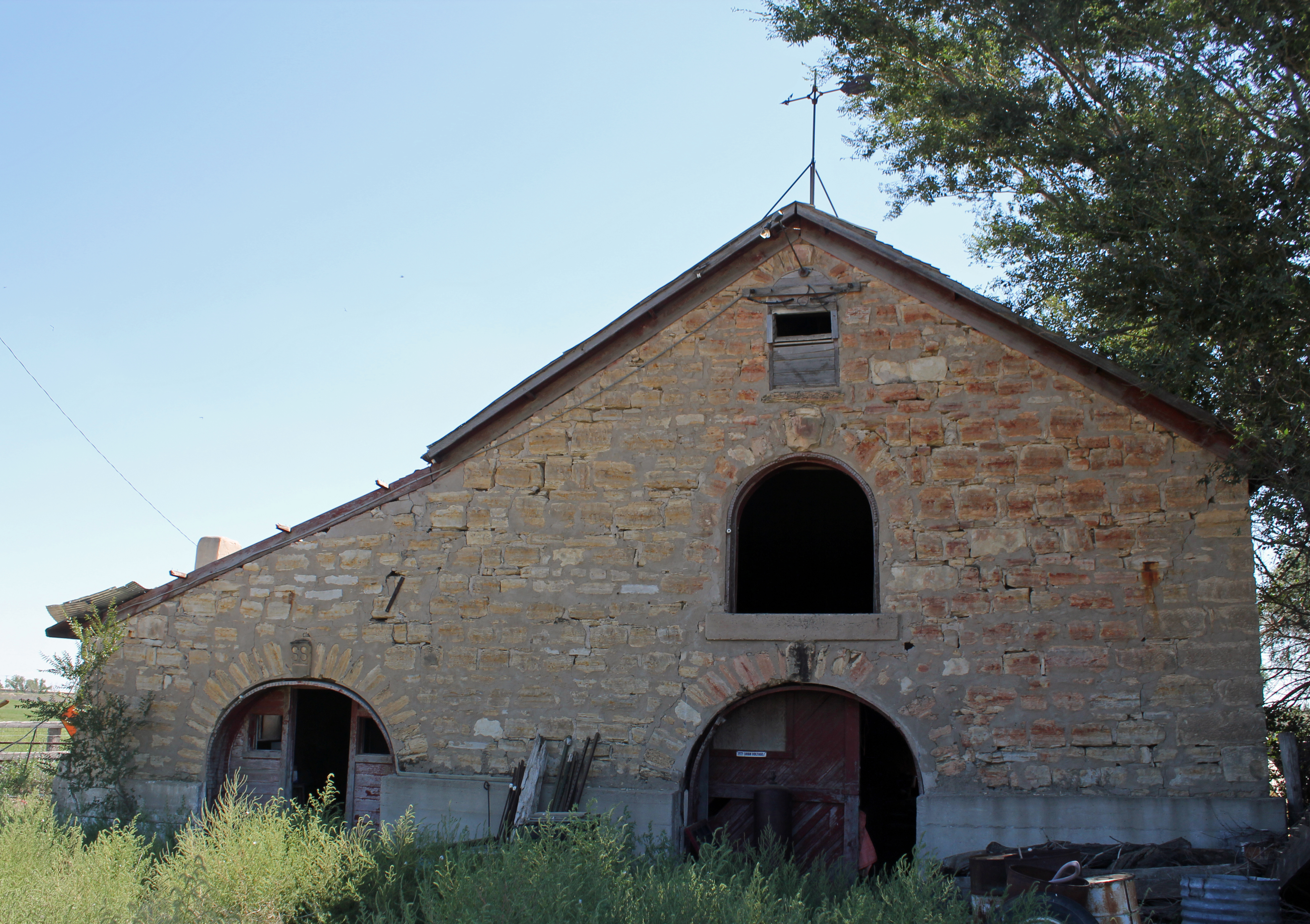

- Location within Colorado
- Location: 407 West Vinson, Holly, Colorado
- Coordinates: 38.04882°N 102.12308°W
- Area: less than one acre
- Built: 1879
- Built by: John Gores, Hiram S. Holly
- Architectural style: Gable roofed stone barn
- NRHP reference No.: 04000068
- Added to NRHP: February 25, 2004

The Holly SS Ranch Barn, or Double S Ranch Barn, at 407 West Vinson in Holly, Colorado, was built in 1879. It is located south of the railroad tracks on the south side of Holly.

It was built for rancher Hiram S. Holly who settled in the area which later became the town of Holly in 1871.

It is a one-and-a-half story structure of "transverse crib" type, having a central aisle with spaces for stalls or cribs on both sides. A tack room at the northeast corner of the barn gives it an overall L-shape. It was built by SS Ranch carpenter John Gores.

The building has a gable roof.

It is located about 100 yards (91 m) southeast of the original stone ranchhouse; together the two buildings are the only surviving buildings of the original ranch. On the north side of the railroad tracks is the town's city hall, in the railroad station building.

It was listed on the National Register of Historic Places in 2004.
