= Edward Davies House =

Historic house in Pennsylvania, United States

- U.S. National Register of Historic Places
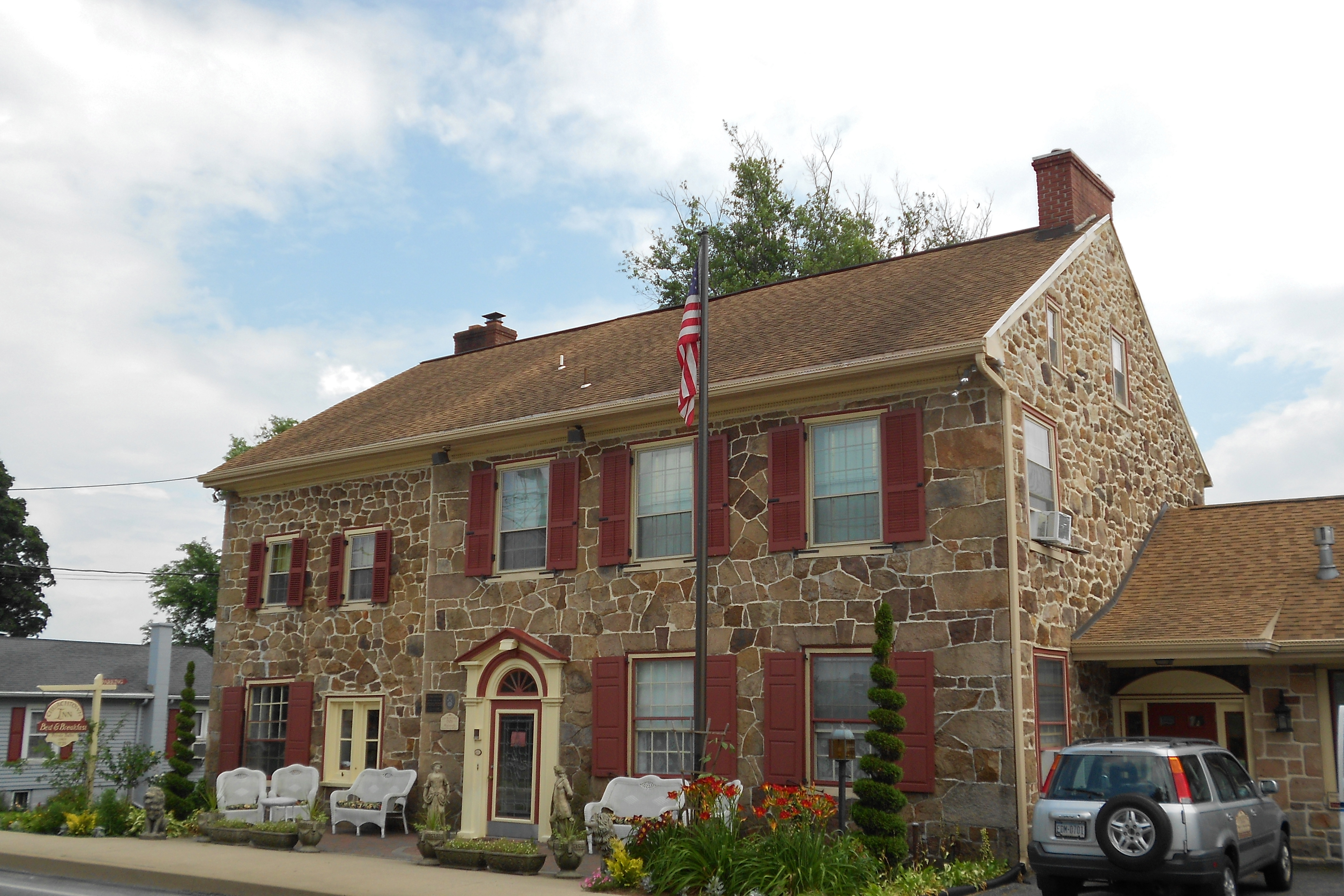

- Location within Pennsylvania Location within the United States
- Location: S side of PA 23, W of Water St. Churchtown, Caernarvon Township, Pennsylvania
- Coordinates: 40°8′1″N 75°57′38″W
- Area: 0.4 acres (0.16 ha)
- Built: 1805
- Architectural style: Federal
- NRHP reference No.: 91001122
- Added to NRHP: September 6, 1991

Edward Davies House is a historic home located at Caernarvon Township in Lancaster County, Pennsylvania. It was built about 1805, and is a 2 1/2-story, T-shaped stone dwelling with a gable roof in the Federal style. It has three sections: the two bay eastern section that was originally Davies shop; the three bay western section that was originally his dwelling; and the rear "Old Kitchen" section.

It was listed on the National Register of Historic Places in 1991.
