= Davies Hotel =

- U.S. National Register of Historic Places
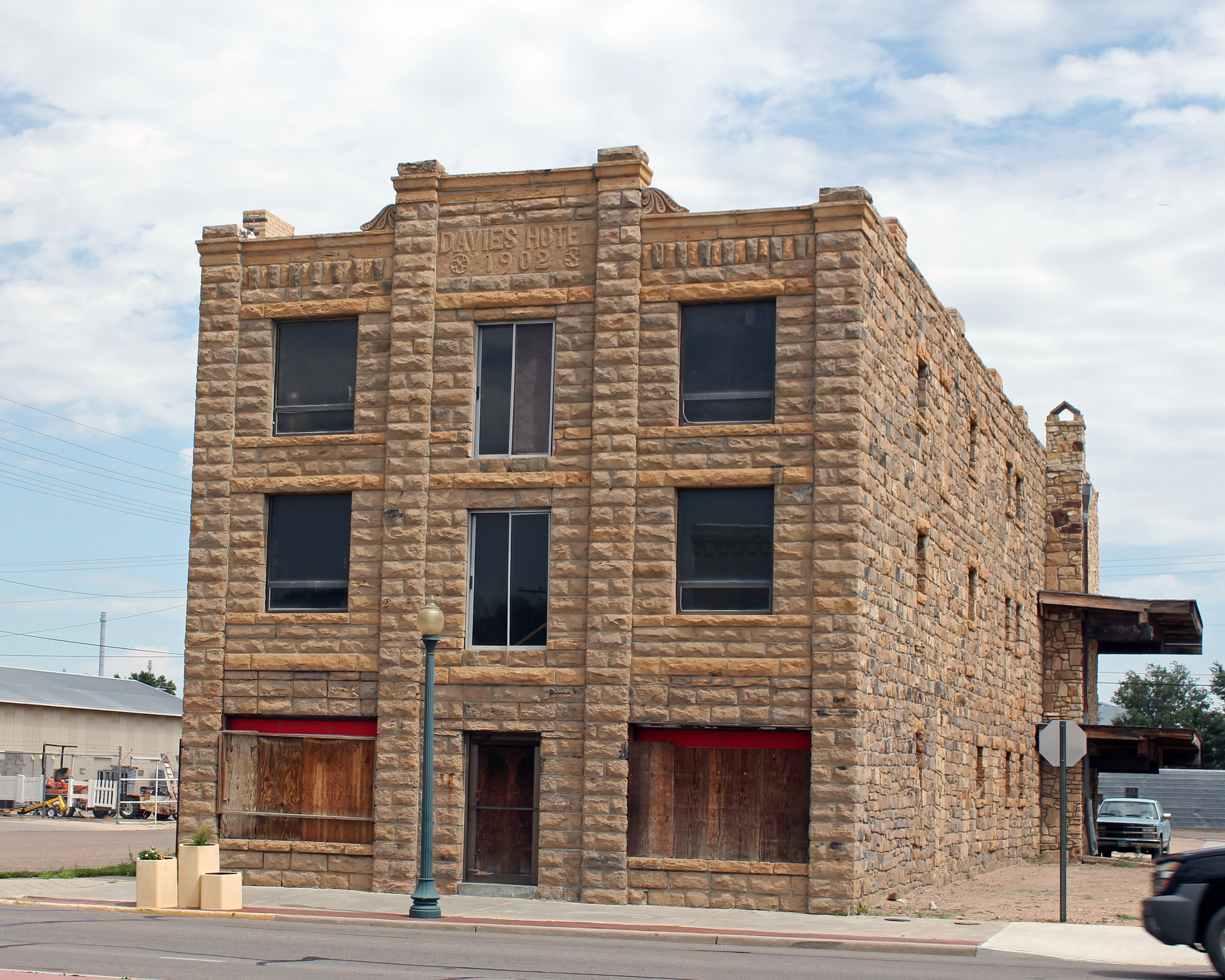

- Location within Colorado
- Location: 122 N. Main, Lamar, Colorado
- Coordinates: 38°05′27″N 102°37′08″W
- Area: less than one acre
- Built: 1902
- NRHP reference No.: 78000875
- Added to NRHP: October 19, 1978

The Davies Hotel, at 122 N. Main in Lamar, Colorado, was built in 1902. It was listed on the National Register of Historic Places in 1978.

It is a three-story sandstone building with a flat roof, upon a stone foundation. It is 33 by 83 feet (10 m × 25 m) in plan.

It has also been known as the Payne Hotel.
