= Tornado outbreak of May 22–25, 2010 =

American tornado outbreak

Meteorological history
- Duration: May 22–25, 2010

Tornado outbreak
- Tornadoes: 80
- Max. rating: EF4 tornado

Overall effects
- Damage: $1.684 million (+6.383 million non-tornadic)
- Part of the tornado outbreaks of 2010

From May 22–25, 2010, a significant tornado outbreak affected a large area from North Dakota to New Mexico. The system that caused the outbreak formed from a low-pressure system that was located in Canada. Isolated tornadoes were reported across portions of central South Dakota that afternoon. The most intense supercell produced a long-lived wedge tornado in and around Bowdle, South Dakota, where numerous houses and farm buildings were destroyed and cars were thrown into the air. It was rated as an EF4, but mostly remained in rural the countryside and no injuries were reported.

== Meteorological synopsis ==
On May 20, a strong low pressure system moved on to the British Columbia coast, bringing with it a cold front over the Rockies, although it produced no showers. Two days later, on May 22, the cold front detached from the low pressure system and connected with a warm front from the Southeastern United States and another low pressure system over Wyoming. Dry line activity increased over the Great Plains and many tornadoes formed in South Dakota. The worst of these tornadoes was rated an EF4 pending further analysis. The next day, on May 23, the warm front joined a portion of the cold front and became an occluded front. The cold front once again joined the Canadian low pressure system. Dry line activity held steady and a number of more tornadoes formed across the Great Plains. Many meteorologists believed that Monday, May 24 would be one of the most active tornado days. Dr. Greg Forbes of the Weather Channel issued an ^{8}/_{10} risk of tornadoes for spots in the Great Plains. A front was stationed over South Dakota, bringing fast moving supercells and tornadoes from North Dakota to Texas. The next day, more severe thunderstorms fired up, but severe activity shifted east and south. VORTEX2 was able to get valuable information when tracking a supercell that produced 3 tornadoes, each weak and short-lived.

== Confirmed tornadoes ==
Confirmed tornadoes by Enhanced Fujita rating
| EFU | EF0 | EF1 | EF2 | EF3 | EF4 | EF5 | Total |
|---|---|---|---|---|---|---|---|
| 0 | 53 | 14 | 10 | 0 | 1 | 0 | 80 |

=== May 22 event ===
List of confirmed tornadoes –Saturday, May 22, 2010 (Note: All dates are based on the local time zone where the tornado touched down; however, all times are in Coordinated Universal Time for consistency.)
| EF# | Location | County / Parish | State | Start Coord. | Time (UTC) | Path length | Max width | Summary |
|---|---|---|---|---|---|---|---|---|
| EF0 | S of Akaska | Walworth | SD | 45.2886°N 100.1235°W | 22:31–22:35 | 0.48 mi (0.77 km) | 50 yd (46 m) | A brief tornado touched down occurred in a field. |
| EF1 | SE of Java | Walworth | SD | 45.4248°N 99.7948°W | 23:16–23:18 | 0.5 mi (0.80 km) | 100 yd (91 m) | A tornado knocked down six wooden power poles before lifting quickly. |
| EF4 | ESE of Java to NE of Bowdle | Walworth, Edmunds | SD | 45.448°N 99.7479°W | 23:21–23:40 | 5.7 mi (9.2 km) | 1,200 yd (1,100 m) | See section on this tornado |
| EF0 | NNW of Chancellor | Pecos | TX | 30.8079°N 103.2501°W | 23:36–23:49 | 1.77 mi (2.85 km) | 150 yd (140 m) | A tornado was observed by trained spotters and local law enforcement, tracking south-southeast. Minor damage was done to vegetation. |
| EF0 | NE of Gretna | Edmunds | SD | 45.48°N 99.46°W | 00:10–00:12 | 0.28 mi (0.45 km) | 30 yd (27 m) | A tornado briefly touched down near US-12. No damage occurred. |
| EF0 | NNE of Beebe | Edmunds | SD | 45.5°N 99.16°W | 00:48–00:50 | 0.19 mi (0.31 km) | 30 yd (27 m) | A tornado briefly touched down and lifted. This tornado occurred simultaneously with the tornado below. |
| EF0 | NNE of Beebe | Edmunds | SD | 45.51°N 99.15°W | 00:48–00:50 | 0.21 mi (0.34 km) | 10 yd (9.1 m) | This tornado occurred simultaneously with the tornado above. It was brief and caused no damage. |
| EF2 | NNE of Ipswich to Wetonka to WSW of Barnard | Edmunds, McPherson, Brown | SD | 45.54°N 99.01°W | 01:01–01:40 | 18.64 mi (30.00 km) | 200 yd (180 m) | A significant, long-track tornado first touched down in northeastern Edmunds County, where it tore off sections from the roof of a barn. The tornado then tracked through primarily crop and pasture land to near Deerfield Colony. Sporadic tree damage was observed along the tornado path with many wooden power poles completely sheared off as the tornado entered into McPherson County. The tornado struck a farm where a calving shed was completely destroyed with large sections of the roof blown over 100 yd (91 m). The tornado then caused moderate damage to a barn with one collapsed wall. Multiple softwood and hardwood trees were uprooted and many power poles were completely snapped near the base. The tornado tore the roof off a turkey barn at the Long Lake Colony. Several homes in Wetonka also sustained minor roof damage. The tornado then entered into western Brown County and did some tree damage before dissipating. |
| EF0 | NW of Chancellor | Pecos | TX | 30.8203°N 103.2987°W | 01:15–01:16 | 0.25 mi (0.40 km) | 150 yd (140 m) | A trained weather spotter reported a weak, brief tornado. No damage was reported. |
| EF1 | WSW of Orient | Hyde | SD | 44.87°N 99.39°W | 01:26–01:29 | 1.62 mi (2.61 km) | 100 yd (91 m) | A tornado struck a farm damaging or destroying several large barns, eighteen grain bins and the garage on a home. A grain cart was also tipped over by the tornado and twelve cattle were killed. |
| EF0 | W of Sparks | Cherry | NE | 42.9399°N 100.2736°W | 01:45–01:50 | 1.03 mi (1.66 km) | 20 yd (18 m) | A tornado touched down over an open field and traveled east where it struck a metal building tearing off a portion of the roof. The tornado destroyed a portion of a grandstand and completely demolished a concession stand before lifting. |
| EF2 | NW of Houghton to W of Hecla | Brown | SD | 45.8636°N 98.3108°W | 02:10–02:13 | 1.29 mi (2.08 km) | 100 yd (91 m) | A strong tornado tore the roof off an outbuilding and threw several grain bins over 100 yd (91 m). Widespread tree damage also occurred. Before dissipating, the tornado damaged another outbuilding and destroyed an empty grain bin. |
| EF2 | Winner | Tripp | SD | 43.3756°N 99.8664°W | 02:11–02:22 | 2.85 mi (4.59 km) | 150 yd (140 m) | A tornado tracked through Winner, blowing down carports, trees, and flipping tractor-trailers. A large barn had its curved roof blown off in one piece and tossed across a corral east of town. Another machine shed was blown apart. |
| EF2 | ENE of Norden to NW of Burton | Keya Paha | NE | 42.9429°N 99.9172°W | 02:30–02:50 | 9.01 mi (14.50 km) | 20 yd (18 m) | A tornado did extensive tree damage when it touched down, before moving northeast and striking two farmsteads. At the first farmstead, a loafing shed and stock trailer were destroyed, extensive tree and fence damage occurred, and a roof was torn off an old hog building. The most extensive damage occurred north of the farmstead where six rural power poles were broken. The tornado continued to move northeast and destroy a windmill. Then a second farmstead was hit with the tornado destroying a quonset before the tornado lifted. |

=== May 23 event ===
List of confirmed tornadoes –Sunday, May 23, 2010
| EF# | Location | County / Parish | State | Start Coord. | Time (UTC) | Path length | Max width | Summary |
|---|---|---|---|---|---|---|---|---|
| EF2 | SE of Verhalen | Reeves, Pecos | TX | 31.0092°N 103.4347°W | 23:56–00:06 | 3.96 mi (6.37 km) | 300 yd (270 m) | A strong tornado moved southeastward damaging 12 power poles. All but two of these poles were broken into 3 or 4 pieces each. The tornado was also photographed by a NWS employee and local law enforcement. |
| EF0 | N of Brownsville to S of Brewster | Thomas | KS | 39.2557°N 101.3645°W | 01:03–01:06 | 2 mi (3.2 km) | 25 yd (23 m) | A storm chaser reported a cone tornado. |
| EF1 | NW of Springfield | Baca | CO | 37.49°N 102.71°W | 01:12–01:24 | 7.9 mi (12.7 km) | 100 yd (91 m) | A tornado traveled an odd northwest direction, where it downed 5 power poles and moved a hay swather. |
| EF1 | WSW of Felt | Cimarron | OK | 36.5301°N 102.8998°W | 01:30–01:35 | 2.05 mi (3.30 km) | 25 yd (23 m) | A tornado remained over open country. |
| EF0 | SE of Ruleton | Sherman | KS | 39.29°N 101.84°W | 01:52 | 0.05 mi (0.080 km) | 10 yd (9.1 m) | A brief tornado was reported. |
| EF2 | SSE of Clayton, NM to W of Felt, OK | Union (NM), Cimarron (OK) | NM, OK | 36.0731°N 103.1326°W | 01:52–02:47 | 21.96 mi (35.34 km) | 440 yd (400 m) | Power lines were downed, barbed wire fences and hay bales were tossed. In addition, a steel building from a feedlot was destroyed and a semi truck was turned over on private property. The tornado crossed the New Mexico-Oklahoma state line and destroyed a steel windmill tower. Three metal feed troughs were also destroyed along with considerable fence damage before the tornado lifted. |
| EF0 | SSE of Clayton | Union | NM | 36.3571°N 103.1445°W | 01:55–02:03 | 2.53 mi (4.07 km) | 100 yd (91 m) | A weak satellite of the previous EF2 tornado was videoed. |
| EF1 | NNE of Goodland | Sherman | KS | 39.483°N 101.6225°W | 02:07–02:17 | 6.36 mi (10.24 km) | 50 yd (46 m) | A stovepipe tornado was visible from the NWS office in Goodland. An irrigation pivot was damaged and trees were downed. Several utility poles were broken. |
| EF1 | W of Amistad | Union | NM | 35.8859°N 103.194°W | 02:10–02:27 | 5.67 mi (9.12 km) | 175 yd (160 m) | A residence was damaged. |
| EF2 | W of Sedan | Union | NM | 36.1056°N 103.1659°W | 02:12–02:36 | 8.82 mi (14.19 km) | 440 yd (400 m) | A single-wide mobile home had its tie-down straps completely destroyed and the undercarriage was carried 40 yd (37 m). Agricultural equipment was also damaged. |
| EF0 | NNE of Goodland | Sherman | KS | 39.5384°N 101.5834°W | 02:16–02:19 | 1.87 mi (3.01 km) | 25 yd (23 m) | A storm chaser reported a cone tornado. |
| EF1 | N of Sedan to SSE of Clayton | Union | NM | 36.2749°N 103.1307°W | 02:36–02:48 | 4.2 mi (6.8 km) | 100 yd (91 m) | A fence was downed and a grain silo was destroyed. |
| EF1 | E of Sedan | Union | NM | 36.0731°N 103.1326°W | 02:59–03:25 | 9.33 mi (15.02 km) | 175 yd (160 m) | Minor damage was reported. |

=== May 24 event ===
List of confirmed tornadoes –Monday, May 24, 2010
| EF# | Location | County / Parish | State | Start Coord. | Time (UTC) | Path length | Max width | Summary |
|---|---|---|---|---|---|---|---|---|
| EF0 | Near Kimball | Kimball | NE | 41.23°N 103.67°W | 17:34–17:44 | 0.5 mi (0.80 km) | 75 yd (69 m) | A tornado was confirmed but no storm survey was performed. |
| EF0 | NE of Scottsbluff | Scotts Bluff | NE | 41.94°N 103.51°W | 18:11–18:30 | 0.25 mi (0.40 km) | 50 yd (46 m) | A tornado was reported near the Minatare Lake State Recreation Area. No survey was performed. |
| EF0 | Near Gering | Scotts Bluff | NE | 41.82°N 103.67°W | 18:16–18:36 | 0.25 mi (0.40 km) | 50 yd (46 m) | A tornado was confirmed, but no storm survey was done. |
| EF0 | WNW of Kimball | Kimball | NE | 41.2743°N 103.8123°W | 18:38–18:45 | 0.25 mi (0.40 km) | 100 yd (91 m) | Law enforcement reported a tornado near a conservation reserve project. No damage occurred. |
| EF2 | SSE of Plainview to SSW of Faith | Meade | SD | 44.53°N 102.12°W | 19:24–19:57 | 22.25 mi (35.81 km) | 440 yd (400 m) | A strong tornado damaged a manufactured home shortly after forming, tearing off its roof and blowing its walls over. The tornado also destroyed an old, abandoned house and a pole barn, and tossed a combine, a hay swather and a van. |
| EF1 | Grafton | Walsh | ND | 48.4°N 97.44°W | 19:30–19:35 | 3 mi (4.8 km) | 50 yd (46 m) | Several trees were blown down and a metal street light pole was snapped in northeastern Grafton. |
| EF0 | ENE of Big Woods to W of Argyle | Marshall | MN | 48.33°N 97.05°W | 19:48–19:55 | 4 mi (6.4 km) | 50 yd (46 m) | A tornado downed a few trees in a shelterbelt and tossed road construction signs. |
| EF0 | SSW of Faith | Meade | SD | 44.95°N 102.08°W | 20:00–20:06 | 4.86 mi (7.82 km) | 100 yd (91 m) | A tornado traveled due north causing no damage. |
| EF0 | NW of Alliance | Box Butte | NE | 42.2023°N 103.018°W | 20:11–20:30 | 0.25 mi (0.40 km) | 50 yd (46 m) | A tornado was reported by the public and relayed on KCOW. No storm survey was performed. |
| EF0 | SSE of Valley City | Barnes | ND | 46.8531°N 97.9595°W | 20:29 | 0.1 mi (0.16 km) | 10 yd (9.1 m) | A brief touchdown and debris cloud were observed by the public. The tornado remained over an open field. |
| EF2 | SSE of Usta to S of Meadow | Perkins | SD | 45.169°N 102.15°W | 20:34–21:00 | 22.85 mi (36.77 km) | 440 yd (400 m) | A tornado destroyed outbuildings on two ranches, tossed farm equipment, damaged trees and killed four calves. |
| EF0 | NE of Halstad | Norman | MN | 47.4523°N 96.6788°W | 20:48–20:51 | 1 mi (1.6 km) | 20 yd (18 m) | A tornado was viewed from a farm as it remained over open fields. |
| EF2 | SSE of Meadow | Perkins | SD | 45.4381°N 102.16°W | 20:55–21:10 | 8.23 mi (13.24 km) | 440 yd (400 m) | A rural school was destroyed. |
| EF0 | W of Shadehill | Perkins | SD | 45.4381°N 102.16°W | 21:34–21:35 | 0.05 mi (0.080 km) | 30 yd (27 m) | The manager of the Shadehill Reservoir State Recreation Area observed a brief tornado touchdown. |
| EF1 | S of New Leipzig | Sioux, Grant | ND | 46.04°N 101.98°W | 23:05–23:15 | 1.63 mi (2.62 km) | 40 yd (37 m) | A low-end EF1 damaged a roof at a farmstead. |
| EF0 | NNW of Fort Yates | Sioux | ND | 46.1546°N 100.6793°W | 01:09–01:13 | 1.35 mi (2.17 km) | 35 yd (32 m) | Minor damage occurred to fences and a trailer home. |
| EF0 | WNW of Spearman | Hansford | TX | 36.2°N 101.2717°W | 01:29–01:42 | 3.06 mi (4.92 km) | 100 yd (91 m) | A farmstead had some minor damage and large trees were downed. |
| EF0 | W of Spearman | Hansford | TX | 36.2°N 101.25°W | 01:37–01:38 | 0.21 mi (0.34 km) | 25 yd (23 m) | This tornado was a satellite of the previous tornado. It remained over open country. |
| EF0 | NW of Spearman | Hansford | TX | 36.24°N 101.24°W | 01:47–01:49 | 0.38 mi (0.61 km) | 25 yd (23 m) | A trained spotter reported an intermittent tornado as it remained over open country. |
| EF0 | S of Tangier | Woodward | OK | 36.379°N 99.53°W | 01:48 | 0.2 mi (0.32 km) | 30 yd (27 m) | A small tornado snapped two power poles and some light farm implements were thrown. The residence at the farm sustained minor damage. |
| EF0 | Near Spearman | Hansford | TX | 36.2°N 101.2°W | 01:56–01:58 | 0.14 mi (0.23 km) | 25 yd (23 m) | A storm spotter reported a tornado over open land. |
| EF1 | SSE of Tuttle | Kidder | ND | 47.0626°N 99.9262°W | 02:00–02:10 | 2.35 mi (3.78 km) | 70 yd (64 m) | A tornado damaged vehicles, stalls, and barns. Some animal feeders were tossed and trees were also uprooted. |

=== May 25 event ===
List of confirmed tornadoes –Tuesday, May 25, 2010
| EF# | Location | County / Parish | State | Start Coord. | Time (UTC) | Path length | Max width | Summary |
|---|---|---|---|---|---|---|---|---|
| EF0 | SW of Lagarteo | Live Oak | TX | 28.0708°N 98.0175°W | 16:30–16:31 | 0.18 mi (0.29 km) | 25 yd (23 m) | A brief tornado damaged metal animal shelters and awnings at a ranch. Limbs were snapped off some small trees and a large mesquite tree was snapped in half. |
| EF0 | NW of Laura | Peoria | IL | 40.9481°N 89.857°W | 19:10–19:14 | 0.65 mi (1.05 km) | 15 yd (14 m) | A landspout tracked over a farm field. |
| EF0 | SSE of Cameo | Roosevelt | NM | 34.27°N 103.2°W | 21:13–21:22 | 0.25 mi (0.40 km) | 10 yd (9.1 m) | An emergency manager reported a tornado briefly touching down over open rangeland. |
| EF0 | SW of Towner (1st tornado) | Kiowa | CO | 38.4306°N 102.1221°W | 21:31–21:33 | 0.01 mi (0.016 km) | 50 yd (46 m) | A brief landspout occurred over open country. |
| EF0 | SW of Towner (2nd tornado) | Kiowa | CO | 38.4107°N 102.1477°W | 21:31–21:41 | 0.13 mi (0.21 km) | 75 yd (69 m) | A landspout tornado occurred over open land. |
| EF0 | SW of Towner (3rd tornado) | Kiowa | CO | 38.4244°N 102.1297°W | 21:32–21:40 | 0.14 mi (0.23 km) | 75 yd (69 m) | A landspout was observed over open land. |
| EF0 | SW of Towner (4th tornado) | Kiowa | CO | 38.4182°N 102.137°W | 21:37–22:03 | 0.36 mi (0.58 km) | 100 yd (91 m) | A tornado tracked over open country. |
| EF0 | SW of Towner (5th tornado) | Kiowa | CO | 38.4159°N 102.1408°W | 21:41–21:48 | 0.2 mi (0.32 km) | 50 yd (46 m) | A landspout occurred over open country. |
| EF0 | SW of Towner (6th tornado) | Kiowa | CO | 38.4192°N 102.1355°W | 21:48–21:49 | 0.1 mi (0.16 km) | 50 yd (46 m) | A landspout occurred over open country. |
| EF0 | SW of Towner (7th tornado) | Kiowa | CO | 38.4146°N 102.1437°W | 21:48–21:55 | 0.26 mi (0.42 km) | 50 yd (46 m) | A landspout occurred over open country. |
| EF0 | SSE of Pleasant Hill | Curry | NM | 34.48°N 103.05°W | 21:55–21:56 | 0.1 mi (0.16 km) | 10 yd (9.1 m) | A tornado occurred just west of the New Mexico-Texas state line. No damage was reported. |
| EF0 | SW of Towner (8th tornado) | Kiowa | CO | 38.412°N 102.146°W | 21:55–22:03 | 0.32 mi (0.51 km) | 75 yd (69 m) | A landspout occurred over open country. |
| EF0 | ESE of Sheridan Lake | Kiowa | CO | 38.4415°N 102.2162°W | 21:56–21:58 | 0.14 mi (0.23 km) | 50 yd (46 m) | A landspout occurred over open country. |
| EF0 | ESE of Sheridan Lake | Kiowa | CO | 38.4375°N 102.215°W | 21:56–21:58 | 0.17 mi (0.27 km) | 50 yd (46 m) | A landspout occurred over open country. |
| EF0 | E of Sheridan Lake | Kiowa | CO | 38.456°N 102.1983°W | 22:07–22:12 | 1.2 mi (1.9 km) | 75 yd (69 m) | A landspout occurred over open country. |
| EF0 | W of Towner | Kiowa | CO | 38.4695°N 102.1635°W | 22:18–22:20 | 0.19 mi (0.31 km) | 50 yd (46 m) | A landspout occurred over open country. |
| EF0 | N of Towner | Kiowa | CO | 38.53°N 102.08°W | 22:20–22:21 | 0.14 mi (0.23 km) | 50 yd (46 m) | A landspout occurred over open country. |
| EF0 | WNW of Horace | Greeley | KS | 38.5647°N 102.0323°W | 23:17–23:20 | 0.83 mi (1.34 km) | 10 yd (9.1 m) | A brief tornado was spotted. |
| EF0 | NNW of Horace | Greeley | KS | 38.6092°N 101.8268°W | 23:49–23:51 | 0.6 mi (0.97 km) | 25 yd (23 m) | A tornado was observed over a wheatfield. |
| EF0 | W of Dimmitt | Castro | TX | 34.55°N 102.3551°W | 00:52–00:53 | 0.2 mi (0.32 km) | 50 yd (46 m) | Numerous storm chasers and storm spotters photographed a brief tornado over open fields. |
| EF0 | WSW of Gove City | Gove | KS | 38.8531°N 100.7337°W | 01:06–01:07 | 0.34 mi (0.55 km) | 10 yd (9.1 m) | A brief tornado occurred. |
| EF0 | NE of Dimmitt | Castro | TX | 34.5909°N 102.2703°W | 01:11 | 0.1 mi (0.16 km) | 20 yd (18 m) | Storm spotters observed a dusty tornado occurring on open rangeland. |
| EF0 | SW of Gove City | Gove | KS | 38.83°N 100.68°W | 01:14–01:20 | 4.77 mi (7.68 km) | 75 yd (69 m) | A tornado was spotted before becoming rain-wrapped. |
| EF0 | NE of Dimmitt | Castro | TX | 34.5807°N 102.2827°W | 01:14 | 0.1 mi (0.16 km) | 20 yd (18 m) | A brief and dusty tornado touched down over open rangeland. |
| EF1 | SSW of Gove City to SSE of Quinter | Gove | KS | 38.8619°N 100.5457°W | 01:26–01:39 | 21.26 mi (34.21 km) | 75 yd (69 m) | Approximately 15 power poles were damaged. |
| EF1 | SE of Gove City to SSE of Quinter to S of Collyer | Gove, Trego | KS | 38.844°N 100.3357°W | 01:44–02:12 | 15.8 mi (25.4 km) | 150 yd (140 m) | A tornado overturned a center-pivot in Gove County. The tornado began to occlude after entering Trego County, taking a sharp northeastern turn. No damage occurred in Trego County. |
| EF0 | ENE of Walsh | Baca | CO | 37.43°N 102.14°W | 01:52–01:56 | 1.05 mi (1.69 km) | 75 yd (69 m) | A tornado tracked northwest, damaging a mobile home and some outbuildings before lifting over open fields. |
| EF1 | NE of Walsh | Baca | CO | 37.4379°N 102.1713°W | 02:00–02:07 | 2.48 mi (3.99 km) | 300 yd (270 m) | A large tornado damaged fencing and uprooted trees. |
| EF0 | S of Ellis to SSW of Yocemento | Ellis | KS | 38.8707°N 99.5589°W | 03:20–03:30 | 6.91 mi (11.12 km) | 75 yd (69 m) | A tornado passed over pastureland. |

=== Bowdle, South Dakota ===
Bowdle, South Dakota
Meteorological history
- Date: May 22, 2010
- Formed: May 22, 2010, 5:21 PM CDT (UTC−05:00)
- Dissipated: May 22, 2010, 5:40 PM CDT (UTC−05:00)
- Duration: 19 minutes

EF4 tornado
- on the Enhanced Fujita scale
- Max width: 1,200 yards (0.68 mi; 1.1 km)
- Highest winds: 166–200 mph (267–322 km/h)

This large and violent tornado first touched down by a farmstead in eastern Walworth County, approximately 6.8 miles (10.9 km) away from Bowdle. (Note: Lee, Finley & Karstens 2012, p. 3428) At the time of the tornado touching down, the parent supercell was in the process of cycling. A 2010 study produced by numerous scientists, including tornado researcher Tim Samaras, determined that the tornado was likely a smaller condensation funnel within a larger area of circulation, but began to rapidly intensify and became the dominant funnel as it crossed South Dakota Highway 47. The visible funnel of the tornado centered itself in proportion to the supercell's mesocyclone as it moved to the northeast; a multiple-vortex structure was documented within the tornado.

Immediately at EF2 intensity, several outbuildings were severely damaged with the residence sustaining siding and roof damage. A stock trailer was thrown about 75 yd (69 m) from its original location. Tree damage was sustained on the west side of the property. The tornado continued moving northeast crossing into Edmunds County, where it then briefly weakened to EF1 strength, where it snapped and broke power poles. At the first farm, several large cottonwood trees were uprooted along with damage to several trailers. Three grain bins were also destroyed. The residence suffered some shingle and antenna damage. The tornado then abruptly weakened over a span of thirty seconds, losing a visible condensation funnel. At this point, the tornado was estimated to have been 220 yards (200 m) in width.

The tornado rapidly intensified as it moved to the northeast, quickly intensifying to EF3 strength where it impacted a second farm 1.5 mi (2.4 km) northwest of Bowdle. At this farmstead, several outbuildings were damaged or destroyed along with widespread tree damage. The main residence at this location suffered no damage. Several grain cars were also rolled about 100 yd (91 m) into the trees behind the house. As the tornado exited this farmstead, it intensified to EF4 strength before tearing through a third farmstead. At this farm, the main residence suffered major damage to walls with part of the roof removed.

Widespread tree damage was sustained with many of the trees completely debarked with only the stumps of the largest branches remaining. Two large garages were completely destroyed with the concrete slab wiped clean. The vehicles in one garage were rolled or tossed from 25 yd (23 m) to 100 yd (91 m) yards away. Another vehicle flew through the air before resting in a tree shelter belt to the north of the residence. Several other outbuildings were completely destroyed.The tornado then toppled six to eight metal power transmission towers as it moved to the north of the farm. One tower was sheared off from the concrete footings and was thrown an estimated 400 yd (370 m). Ground scouring was visible along the path of these towers. The large tornado began to track east, declining to EF2 intensity before crossing over SD-47 north of Bowdle, where a state radio tower was toppled. The tornado lifted a short time later. The tornado was the first to be rated EF4 in South Dakota history since 2003.

== See also ==
- Weather of 2010
- List of North American tornadoes and tornado outbreaks
- List of F4 and EF4 tornadoes
  - List of F4 and EF4 tornadoes (2010–2019)
- List of United States tornadoes in May 2010

== Sources ==
- Lee, Bruce D.; Finley, Catherine Av.; Karstens, Christopher D. (2012). "The Bowdle, South Dakota, Cyclic Tornadic Supercell of 22 May 2010: Surface Analysis of Rear-Flank Downdraft Evolution and Multiple Internal Surges". American Meteorological Society. 140 (11): 3419–3441. Bibcode:2012MWRv..140.3419L. doi:10.1175/MWR-D-11-00351.1.
- Karstens, Christopher; Samaras, Timothy; Gallus, William A.; Catherine, A (2012). "ANALYSIS OF NEAR-SURFACE WIND FLOW IN CLOSE PROXIMITY TO TORNADOES". ResearchGate.
