= Brandon, Colorado =

Census-designated place in Kiowa County, Colorado, United States

- Census-designated place
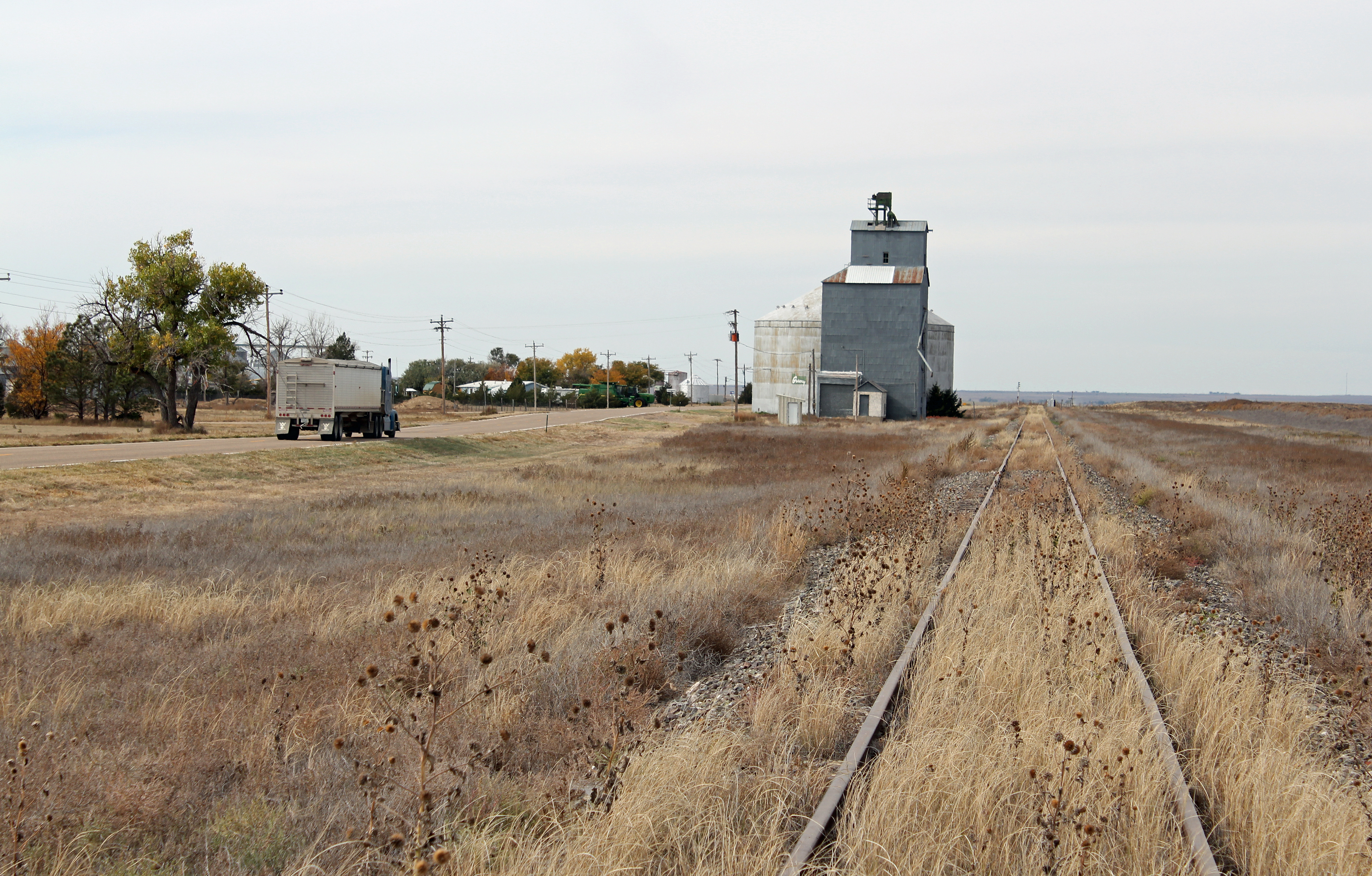
- Brandon (2015)

- Location within Kiowa County and Colorado

- Location of Brandon, Colorado. Brandon (Colorado)
- Coordinates: 38°26′47″N 102°26′28″W
- Country: United States
- State: Colorado
- County: Kiowa
- Founded: 1887

Government
  - Type: Unincorporated community
  - Body: Kiowa County

Area
  - Total: 0.117 sq mi (0.304 km^{2})
  - Land: 0.117 sq mi (0.304 km^{2})
  - Water: 0 sq mi (0.000 km^{2})
- Elevation: 3,924 ft (1,196 m)

Population (2020)
  - Total: 21
  - Density: 180/sq mi (69/km^{2})
- Time zone: UTC−07:00 (MST)
  - Summer (DST): UTC−06:00 (MDT)
- ZIP Code: 81071
- Area code: 719
- GNIS CDP ID: 2583215
- FIPS code: 08-08290

Brandon is an unincorporated community and census-designated place (CDP) located in Kiowa County, Colorado, United States. The population of the Brandon CDP was 21 at the United States Census 2020.

== History ==
Brandon was established in late 1887. The Brandon, Colorado, post office operated from May 19, 1888, until February 28, 1963. The Sheridan Lake, Colorado post office (Zip Code 81071) now serves Brandon postal addresses.

== Geography ==
Brandon is located in eastern Kiowa County at coordinates 38.4464°N 102.4396°W at an elevation of 3,927 feet (1,197 m) . Colorado State Highway 96 passes along the north side of the community, leading west 20 miles (32 km) to Eads, the county seat, and east 8 miles (13 km) to Sheridan Lake.

At the 2020 United States Census, the Brandon CDP had an area of 75 acres (0.304 km^{2}), all land.

== Demographics ==
Brandon CDP, Colorado
Year	Pop.	±%
2010	21	—
2020	21	+0.0%
Source: United States Census Bureau

The United States Census Bureau initially defined the Brandon CDP for the United States Census 2010.

== See also ==
- List of census-designated places in Colorado
