= Sand Creek Massacre National Historic Site =

National Historic Site of the United States

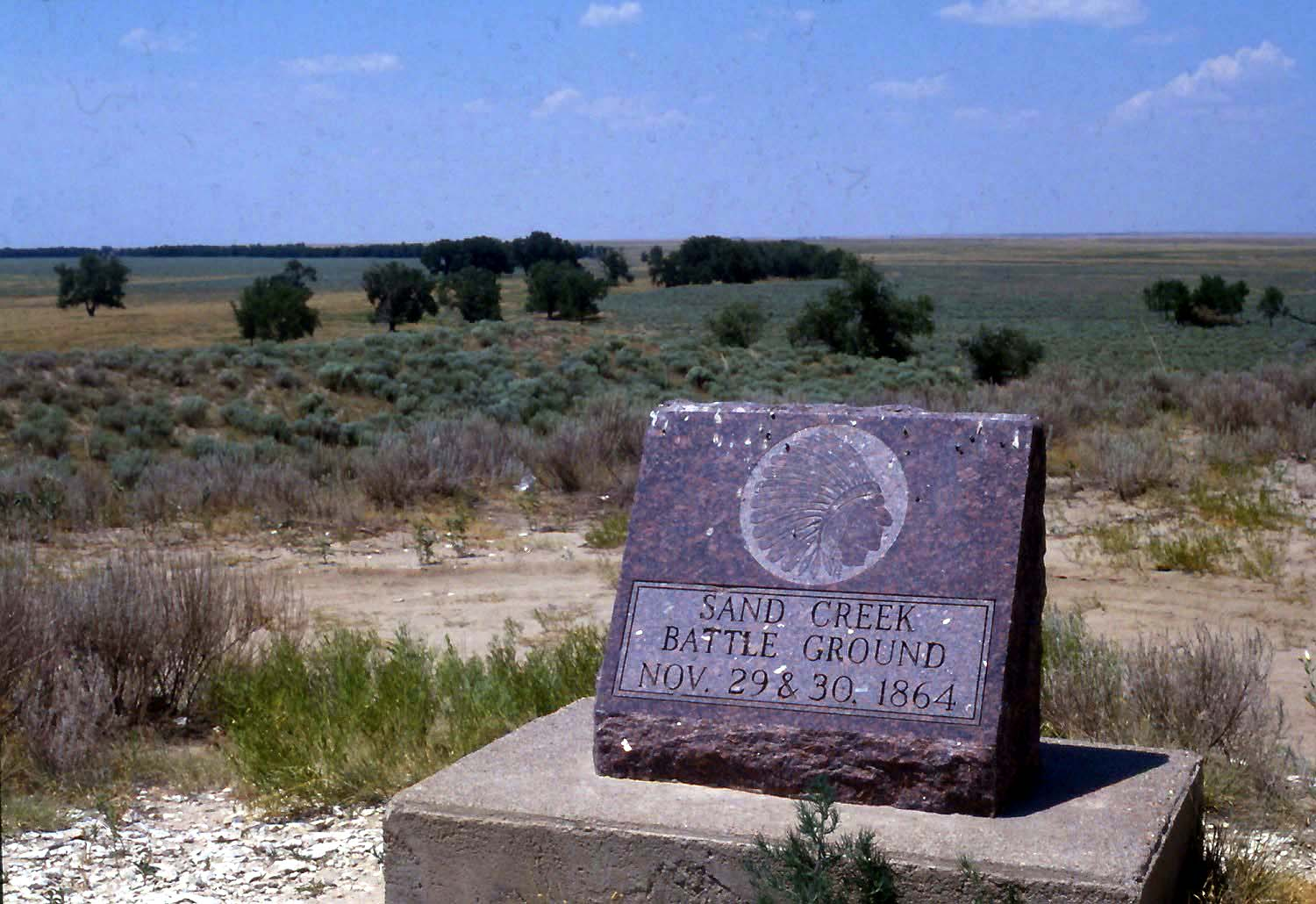
- The site, July 1985

- Location within Colorado Location within the United States
- Location: Kiowa County, Colorado, United States
- Nearest city: Eads, CO
- Coordinates: 38.54083°N 102.52861°W
- Area: 12,583 acres (50.92 km^{2})
- Established: April 27, 2007
- Visitors: 5,860 (in 2023)
- Governing body: National Park Service
- Website: Sand Creek Massacre National Historic Site

Sand Creek Massacre National Historic Site is a National Historic Site in Kiowa County, Colorado, commemorating the Sand Creek massacre that occurred here on November 29, 1864. The site is considered sacred after the unprovoked assault on an encampment of approximately 750 Native people resulted in the murder of hundreds of men, women and children. Near Eads and Chivington, the site is about 170 miles (270 km) southeast of Denver and about 125 miles (200 km) east of Pueblo. A few basic park facilities have been opened at this site.

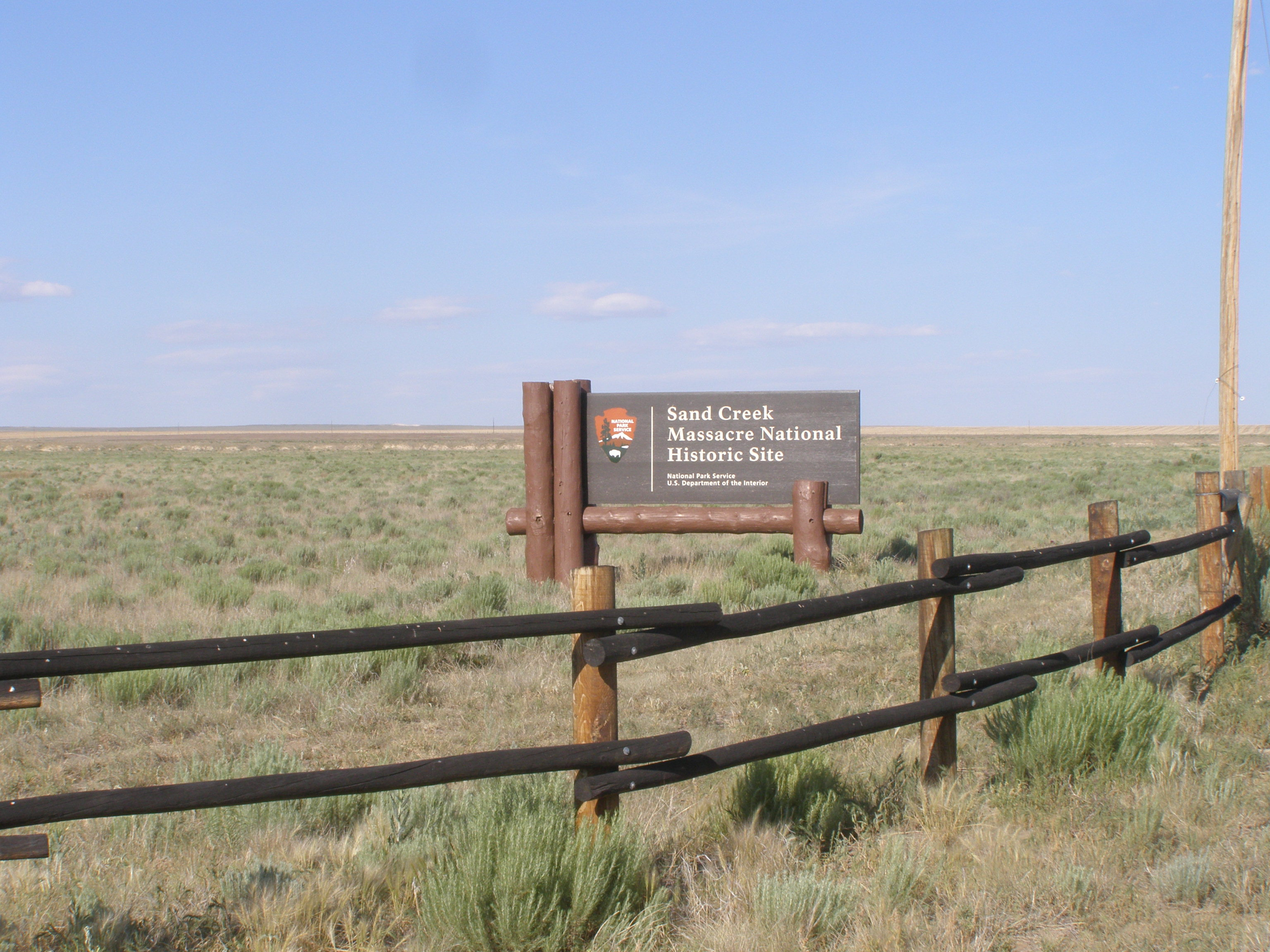
Entrance sign for Sand Creek Massacre NHS

In 1999, archaeological teams from the National Park Service, Dept. of the Interior BLM, Colorado Historical Society and accompanied by Native American observers, made a major archaeological discovery of remains of the massacre site. Large numbers of period bullets, camp equipment, and other items convinced the NPS that they had found the correct site.

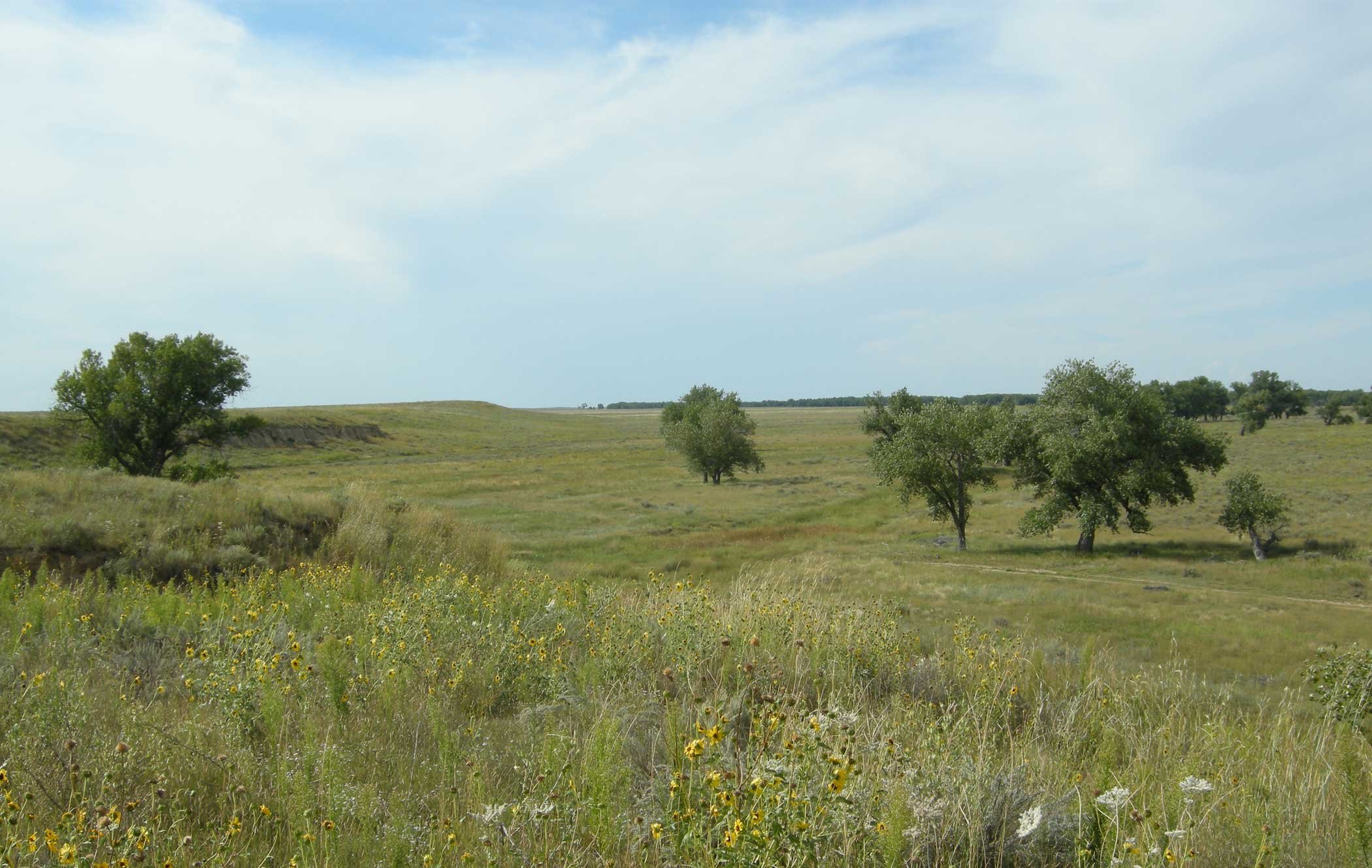
Sand Creek massacre site

The Historic Site was authorized by Public Law 106-465 on November 7, 2000, in order to "recognize the national significance of the massacre in American history, and its ongoing significance to the Cheyenne and Arapaho people and the descendants of the massacre victims." The law authorized establishment of the site once the National Park Service acquired sufficient land from willing sellers to preserve, commemorate, and interpret the massacre. The site near the junction of County Road 54 and County Road "W" was listed on the National Register of Historic Places on September 28, 2001. The site contains a small visitor center, interpretive plaques and signage, monuments located on a hilltop overlooking the massacre site, and two walking trails. The massacre site itself is off-limits to visitors.

On August 2, 2005, President George W. Bush gave final approval for the site. On April 23, 2007, it was announced that site would become America's 391st official park unit with an effective date of April 27, 2007. The dedication ceremony was held on April 28, 2007. In October 2022, leaders from the Northern Arapaho Tribe, the Northern Cheyenne Tribe, the Cheyenne and Arapaho Tribes along with descendants of some of the massacre’s victims and survivors joined Secretary of the Interior Deb Haaland at the site as she announced the purchase of an additional 3,478 acres (1,407 ha). The area included lands listed on the National Register of Historic Places for their significance. Archaeological remains include evidence of the village where Cheyenne and Arapaho families were camped, along with an intact viewshed that is key to the integrity of the site. The expansion of the site contributed to one of the most intact shortgrass prairie ecosystems within the National Park system, providing habitat for a wide range of plants, wildlife and species of special concern.

Currently, the site encompasses 12,583 acres (50.92 km^{2}). As of 2022, 6,503 acres (26.32 km^{2}) are federally owned. By 2004, the federal government acquired 920 acres (3.7 km^{2}) from private landowners. On September 9, 2006, the Cheyenne and Arapaho Tribes of Oklahoma conveyed to the United States title to 1,465 acres (6 km^{2}) to be held in trust for the National Historic Site. The site includes 640 acres (260 ha) acquired and preserved by the American Battlefield Trust and its partners. In October 2022, the federal service acquired an additional 3,478 acres (14.07 km^{2})

== See also ==
- List of battles fought in Colorado
- Sand Creek massacre
