= Adobe Creek =

Adobe Creek is the name of several streams:

== Rivers ==
=== United States ===
California

- Adobe Creek (Santa Clara County, California), a tributary of San Francisco Bay in Santa Clara County
- Adobe Creek (Sonoma County, California), a tributary of the Petaluma River in Sonoma County
- Adobe Creek (Lake County, California), a tributary of Clear Lake

Colorado

- Adobe Creek (Arkansas River tributary)
