= Adobe Creek Reservoir =

- Blue Lake
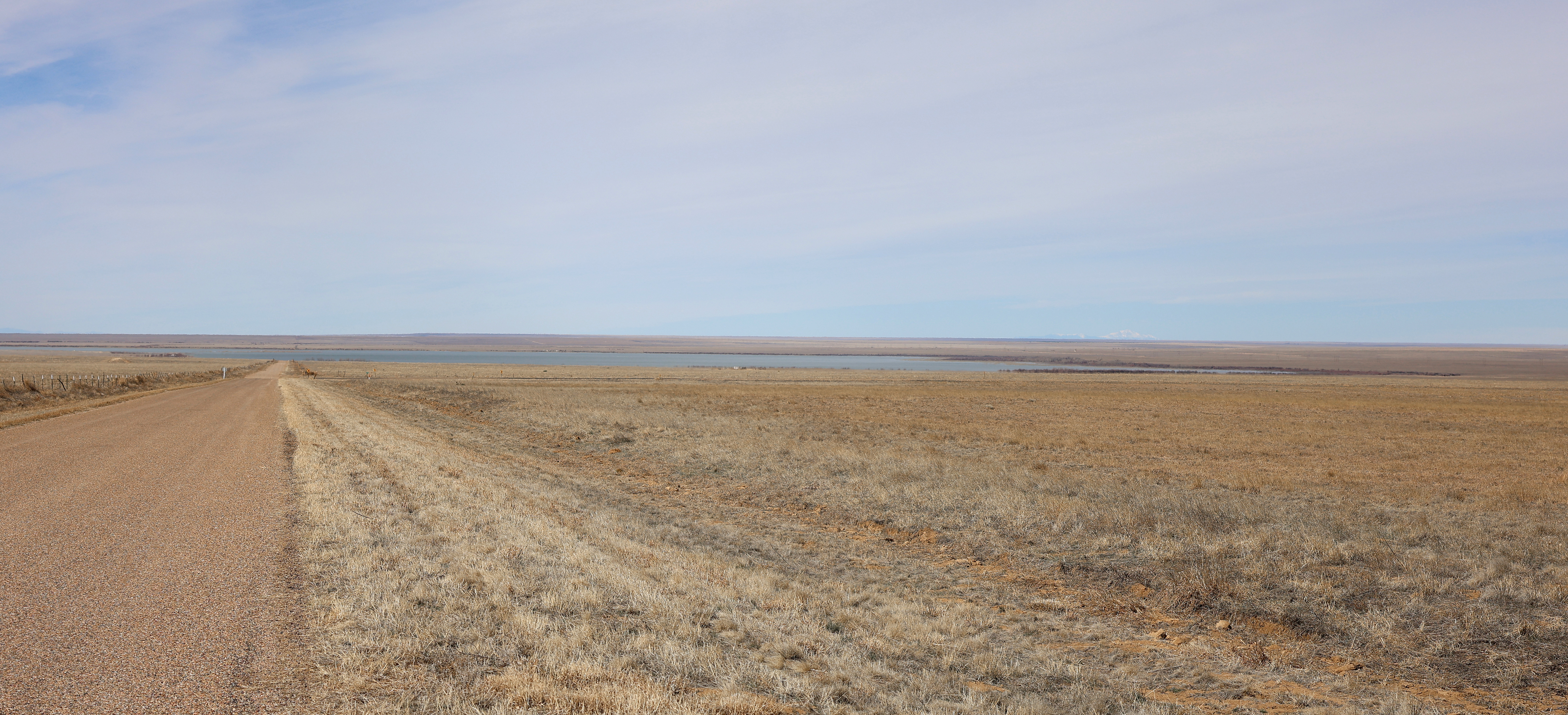
- The reservoir in 2025

- The reservoir's location in Colorado
- Location: Bent and Kiowa counties, Colorado, U.S.
- Coordinates: 38°15′42.84″N 103°14′47.09″W
- Type: reservoir
- Primary inflows: Adobe Creek Inlet Canal; Fort Lyon Storage Canal
- Primary outflows: Adobe Creek Reservoir Outlet Ditch
- Basin countries: United States
- Managing agency: Fort Lyon Canal Company
- Designation: Adobe Creek Reservoir State Wildlife Area
- Built: 1904
- Surface area: 5,000 acres (2,000 ha)
- Water volume: 122,360 acre-feet (150,930,000 cubic meters)
- Shore length^{1}: 16 miles (26 kilometers)
- Surface elevation: 4,131 feet (1,259 meters)
- ^{1} Shore length is not a well-defined measure.

Adobe Creek Reservoir lies in a remote area of Bent and Kiowa counties in Colorado, U.S. The reservoir is an off-stream storage impoundment used to store water for agricultural irrigation. Only a few small unnamed intermittent creeks flow into the lake. The lake is chiefly fed by the Adobe Creek Inlet, a human-made ditch that draws water from nearby Adobe Creek and from the Fort Lyon Storage Canal. The reservoir's outlet is the Adobe Creek Reservoir Outlet Ditch, which empties into Adobe Creek. The reservoir, which lies at an elevation of 4,131 feet (1,259 meters) on Colorado's Eastern Plains, is a former Colorado state wildlife area.

== Names ==
Adobe Creek Reservoir is also often called Blue Lake, especially by locals in the area around the lake.

== Dam ==
The Adobe Creek Dam, NID ID CO00515, is a 41-foot (12-meter) high earthen dam that can store up to 122,360 acre-feet (150,930,000 cubic meters) of water. It was built in 1904 and is 7,375 feet (2,248 meters) wide. The dam and reservoir are owned by the Fort Lyon Canal Company.

== State wildlife area ==
The lake and the immediate area around made up the former Adobe Creek Reservoir State Wildlife Area. In 2026, the lake's owner decided to end its lease with Colorado Parks and Wildlife, effectively ending public access to the lake and the area around it. Fishing was the wildlife area's chief activity. Specifically, anglers were able to catch black crappie, blue catfish, channel catfish, freshwater drum, largemouth bass, saugeye, walleye, and wiper.

== See also ==
Adobe Creek (Arkansas River tributary)
