= May 2010 tornado outbreak =

May 2010 tornado outbreak may refer to:

- Tornado outbreak of April 30 – May 2, 2010
- Tornado outbreak of May 10–13, 2010
- Late-May 2010 tornado outbreak
