= Adobe Creek (Arkansas River tributary) =

Stream in Colorado, United States

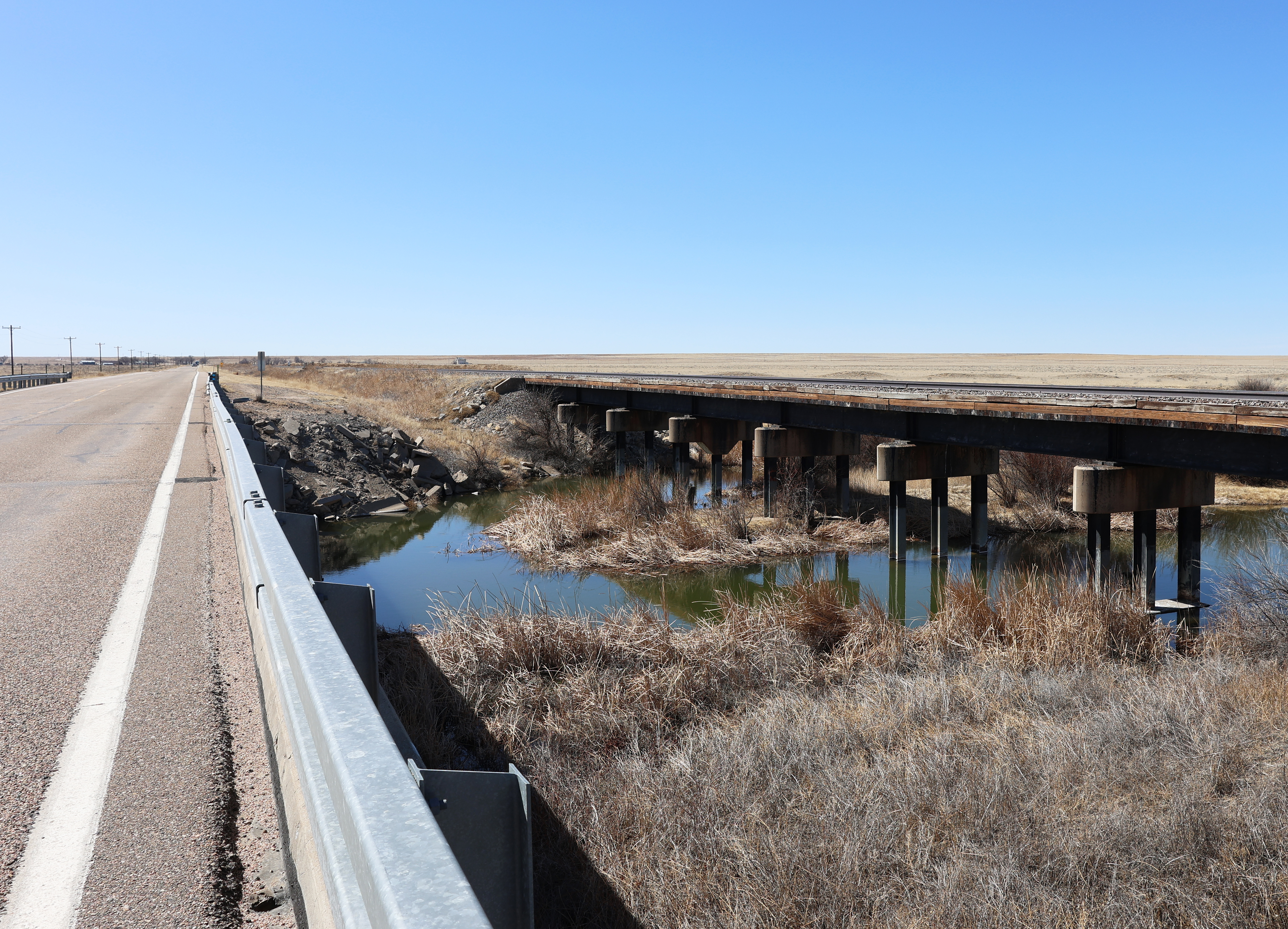
- The creek viewed from a bridge over it on State Highway 96, with the Colorado Pacific Railroad line (the Towner Line) on the right

- Location of the mouth of Adobe Creek in Colorado

Physical characteristics
- Source
  - location: south of Karval, Colorado
  - coordinates: 38°43′15.99″N 103°32′4.79″W
- Mouth
  - location: Confluence with the Arkansas
  - coordinates: 38°4′52.02″N 103°17′30.76″W
  - elevation: 3,927 ft (1,197 m)

Basin features
- Progression: Arkansas—Mississippi
- Tributaries
  - left: East Fork Adobe Creek
  - right: Scott Draw; Johns Creek

Adobe Creek is a tributary of the Arkansas River in southeastern Colorado, U.S.

== Course ==
The creek rises in Lincoln County south of Karval and flows in a generally north-to-south direction. From there it receives its tributary Scott Draw. Entering Kiowa County, it receives its tributaries East Fork Adobe Creek and Johns Creek. Throughout its course, it also receives a few unnamed tributaries, chiefly intermittent streams. After the creek passes by Arlington and under State Highway 96, it passes by the Adobe Creek Inlet Canal. This canal draws water from the creek to supply the Adobe Creek Reservoir (also called Blue Lake), which is named for the creek. The reservoir is an off-stream storage impoundment used for agricultural irrigation and recreation. The reservoir has an outlet canal, called the Adobe Creek Reservoir Outlet Ditch, used when the reservoir overflows, that connects back to and empties into Adobe Creek. Next, the reservoir is dammed twice at the Las Animas Fish Hatchery, and its water is used to supply the hatchery with water. Next, the creek is impounded by a small dam that creates Dawn Reservoir. Finally, at its mouth, the creek empties into the Arkansas River in Bent County.

== Monitoring station ==
The U.S. Geological Survey maintains a stream gauge along the creek at Highway 194 in Bent County.

== See also ==
- List of rivers of Colorado
