= Haswell, Colorado =

Town in Colorado, United States

- Statutory Town
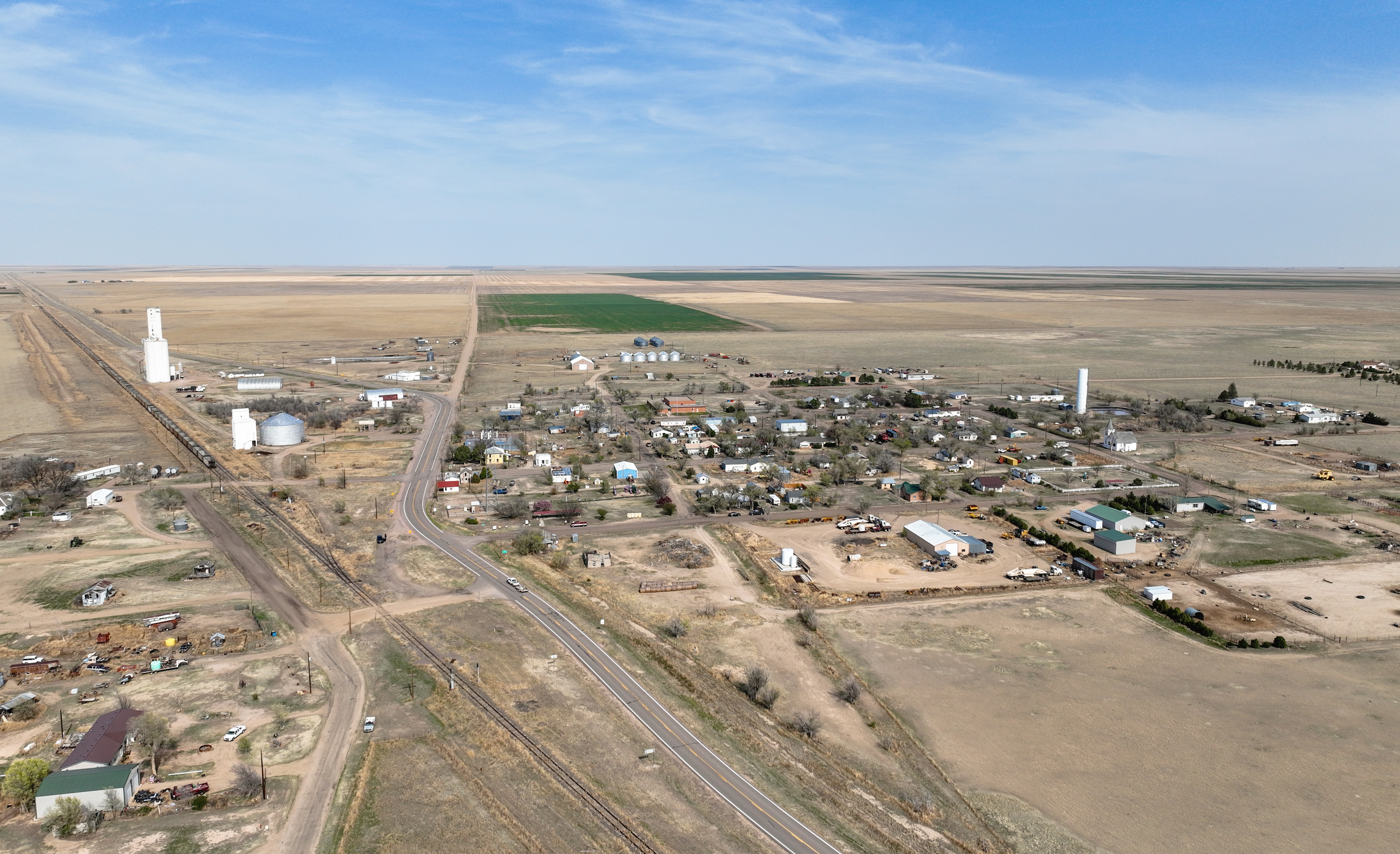
- Haswell (2023)

- Location within Kiowa County and Colorado
- Coordinates: 38°27′09″N 103°09′54″W
- Country: United States
- State: Colorado
- County: Kiowa
- Platted: 1908
- Incorporated: September 2, 1920

Area
  - Total: 0.803 sq mi (2.079 km^{2})
  - Land: 0.803 sq mi (2.079 km^{2})
  - Water: 0 sq mi (0.000 km^{2})
- Elevation: 4,544 ft (1,385 m)

Population (2020)
  - Total: 71
  - Density: 88/sq mi (34/km^{2})
- Time zone: UTC−7 (MST)
  - Summer (DST): UTC−6 (MDT)
- ZIP Code: 81045
- Area code: 719
- FIPS code: 08-34740
- GNIS ID: 195308
- Website: Haswell webpage

Haswell is a statutory town located in Kiowa County, Colorado, United States. The town population was 71 at the 2020 United States census.

== History ==
Haswell was established in 1905 or 1908, having grown up around one of the section houses built along the Missouri Pacific Railroad in eastern Colorado that were named after prominent men in alphabetical order from the Kansas State line to the west toward Pueblo, by Helen, daughter of railroad magnate Jay Gould, at the time of the railroad line's construction in 1888. It was incorporated in 1920.

== Geography ==
Haswell is located in western Kiowa County. Colorado State Highway 96 passes through the town, leading east 22 miles (35 km) to Eads, the county seat, and southwest 38 miles (61 km) to Ordway.

At the 2020 United States census, the town had a total area of 514 acres (2.079 km^{2}), all of it land.

== Demographics ==
Historical population
Census	Pop.	Note	%±
1930	156		—
1940	163		4.5%
1950	163		0.0%
1960	169		3.7%
1970	135		−20.1%
1980	126		−6.7%
1990	62		−50.8%
2000	84		35.5%
2010	68		−19.0%
2020	71		4.4%
U.S. Decennial Census

As of the census of 2000, there were 84 people, 31 households, and 24 families residing in the town. The population density was 99.8 inhabitants per square mile (38.5/km^{2}). There were 41 housing units at an average density of 48.7 per square mile (18.8/km^{2}). The racial makeup of the town was 90.48% White, 2.38% African American, 5.95% Native American, and 1.19% from two or more races.

There were 31 households, out of which 41.9% had children under the age of 18 living with them, 61.3% were married couples living together, 16.1% had a female householder with no husband present, and 19.4% were non-families. 19.4% of all households were made up of individuals, and 9.7% had someone living alone who was 65 years of age or older. The average household size was 2.71 and the average family size was 3.04.

In the town, the population was spread out, with 33.3% under the age of 18, 8.3% from 18 to 24, 28.6% from 25 to 44, 16.7% from 45 to 64, and 13.1% who were 65 years of age or older. The median age was 34 years. For every 100 females, there were 127.0 males. For every 100 females age 18 and over, there were 124.0 males.

The median income for a household in the town was $30,938, and the median income for a family was $32,500. Males had a median income of $31,875 versus $9,750 for females. The per capita income for the town was $15,638. There were 25.0% of families and 27.3% of the population living below the poverty line, including 34.6% of under eighteens and none of those over 64.

== Notable facilities ==
Haswell is believed to have the United States' smallest jail. It is approximately 12 by 14 feet (3.7 by 4.3 m) (exterior dimensions), which makes it several feet smaller in each dimension than that of Randsburg, California's jail.

The Paul Plishner Radio Astronomy and Space Sciences Center is located 5 miles (8 km) south of Haswell in a remote, radio-quiet area. The center includes a 60-foot (18 m) parabolic dish antenna used for radio astronomy research.

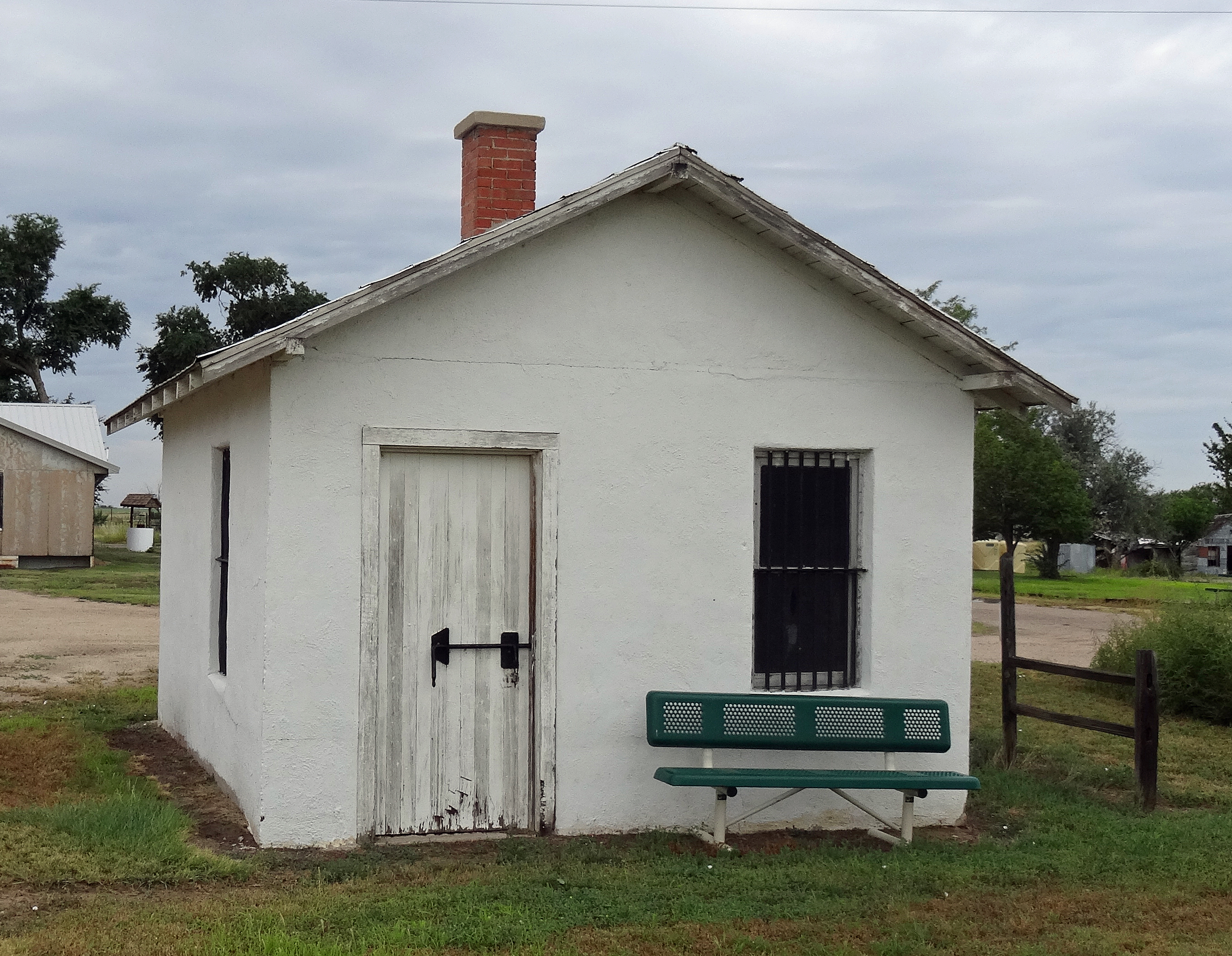
Haswell's jail.

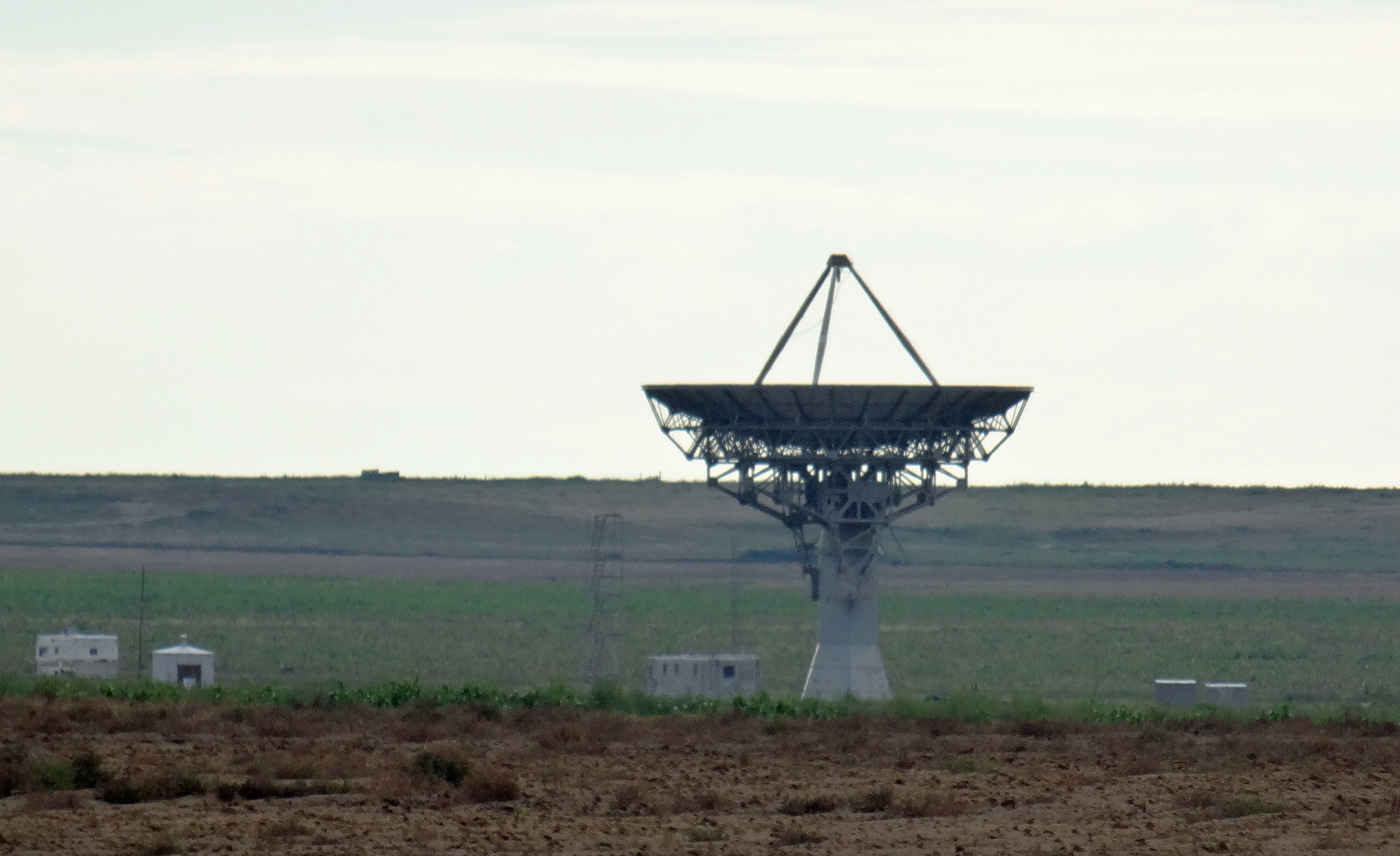
The radio astronomy telescope near Haswell

== Naming of Intel Microchip ==
In 2013, the Intel corporation announced that it was naming its newest processor microarchitecture Haswell, after the town.

== See also ==
- List of municipalities in Colorado
