= Towner, Colorado =

Census-designated place in Kiowa County, CO, USA

- Census-designated place
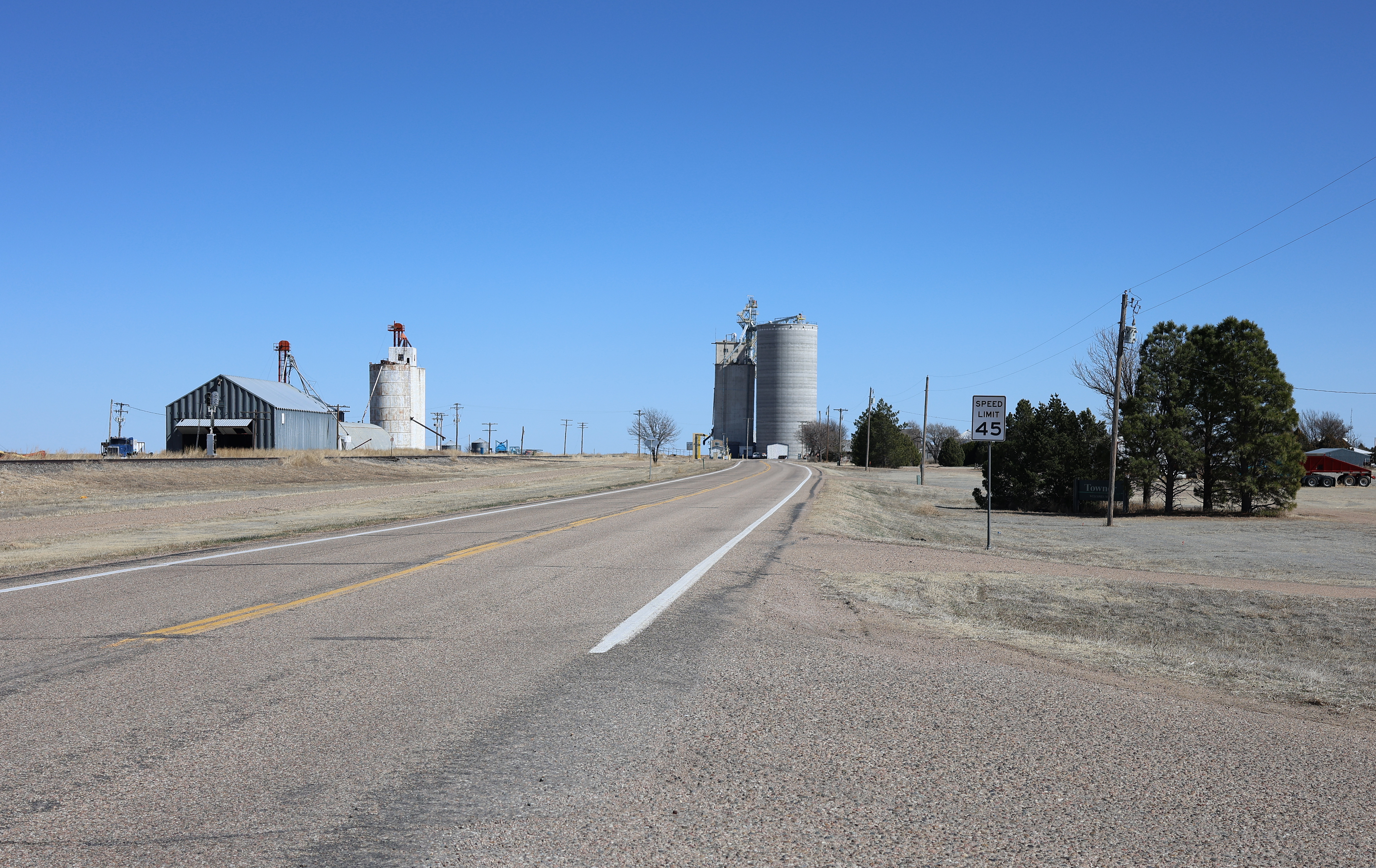
- Entering from west on State Highway 96 (2024)

- Location within Kiowa County and Colorado
- Coordinates: 38°28′13″N 102°04′50″W
- Country: United States
- State: Colorado
- County: Kiowa

Area
  - Total: 0.037 sq mi (0.097 km^{2})
  - Land: 0.037 sq mi (0.097 km^{2})
  - Water: 0 sq mi (0.000 km^{2})
- Elevation: 3,931 ft (1,198 m)

Population (2020)
  - Total: 18
  - Density: 480/sq mi (190/km^{2})
- Time zone: UTC−7 (MST)
  - Summer (DST): UTC−6 (MDT)
- ZIP Code: 81071 (original 81080)
- Area code: 719
- FIPS code: 08-78335
- GNIS ID: 2583306

Towner is a census-designated place (CDP) in and governed by Kiowa County, Colorado, United States. As of the 2020 census, its population was 18. It is the easternmost municipality in both the state of Colorado and the Western United States, located less than 2 miles (3 km) from the Kansas state line, along Colorado State Highway 96.

== History ==
The community was originally known as "Memphis". In the late 1880s, this community was involved in a "fight" to attract a railroad station against nearby Colokan, Kansas (now a ghost town).

In 1931, five students and their bus driver died in the Pleasant Hill bus tragedy near Towner.

The Sheridan Lake post office (Zip Code 81071) serves Towner postal addresses. Towner's post office (ZIP Code 81080) closed down in 1992.

It was a frequent attraction for Kansans when their state was "dry".

The town currently supports two grain elevators. Its population swells during harvest due to the influx of agricultural crews who often camp in the town.

== Geography ==
Towner is located in eastern Kiowa County. Colorado State Highway 96 passes through the community. The closest gas station is about 11 miles (18 km) to the west on Highway 96 in the town of Sheridan Lake. The Kansas state line is 2 miles (3 km) to the east, and Tribune, Kansas, is 18 miles (29 km) to the east of Towner via Kansas State Highway 96.

The Towner CDP has an area of 24 acres (0.097 km^{2}), all land.

Hunting opportunities are abundant in the area, with deer, pronghorn, and pheasant commonplace, as well as an occasional elk sighting.

== Demographics ==
Towner CDP, Colorado
Year	Pop.	±%
2010	22	—
2020	18	−18.2%
Source: United States Census Bureau

The United States Census Bureau initially defined the Towner CDP for the United States Census 2010.

== Education ==
Towner students attend Plainview School, close to Sheridan Lake. It is responsible for the education of students in grades pre-kindergarten through grade 12.

== See also ==
- List of census-designated places in Colorado
