= Chivington, Colorado =

Unincorporated community in Kiowa County, CO, USA

- Unincorporated community
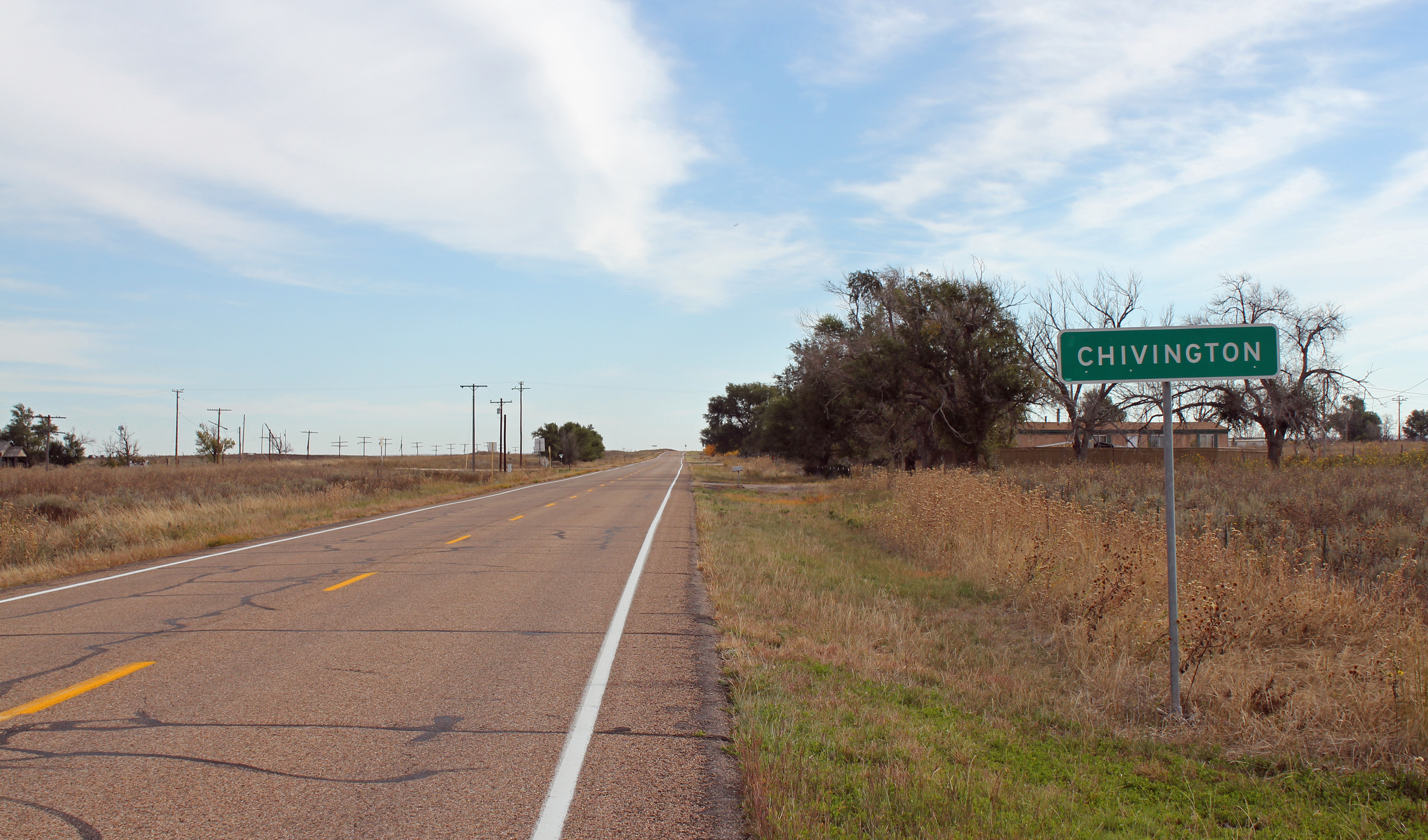
- Chivington (2015)

- Location of Chivington, Colorado. Chivington (Colorado)
- Coordinates: 38°26′11″N 102°32′37″W
- Country: United States
- State: Colorado
- County: Kiowa

Government
  - Type: Unincorporated community
  - Body: Kiowa County
- Elevation: 3,891 ft (1,186 m)
- Time zone: UTC−07:00 (MST)
  - Summer (DST): UTC−06:00 (MDT)
- ZIP code: Eads 81036
- Area code: 719
- GNIS place ID: 195316

Chivington is an unincorporated community in Kiowa County, Colorado, United States. The U.S. Post Office at Eads (ZIP Code 81036) now serves Chivington postal addresses.

== History ==
Chivington (est. 1887) was one of several railroad towns in Kiowa County on eastern Colorado's plains along the Missouri Pacific Railroad line, and in the late 19th century, eastern Colorado had a lot of agriculture and related commerce. Railroad workers also briefly contributed to the local economy as the Missouri Pacific extended into Colorado Springs, Pueblo, Palmer Lake, and eventually brought service into Denver.

The community was named for the Reverend John Milton Chivington, a colonel in the Union Army during the American Civil War, who was celebrated as the hero of the 1862 Battle of Glorieta Pass. He later commanded the 700 Union soldiers who perpetrated the Sand Creek massacre, a slaughter of approximately 150 Native Americans in a nearby gulch. His men took human body parts as trophies, including unborn fetuses and genitalia of both genders. The massacre was condemned by the United States Congress Joint Committee on the Conduct of the War and Territorial Governor John Evans lost his job for encouraging Chivington.

The Chivington, Colorado, post office operated from October 24, 1887, until January 1, 1991. During Chivington's early days, it supported a number of local businesses, the crown jewel being the $10,000, 60-room, 3-story Queen Anne styled Kingdon Hotel—but when the railroad realized that Chivington's water had too high an alkali content to use in the locomotive boilers, a nearby town in Kansas (Horace) instead became an important watering stop for the railroad. The Kingdon Hotel was disassembled (its intended purpose was to house railroad workers), and its materials shipped to two other Colorado communities for constructing buildings there—a common fate in Colorado, in the era.

The Dust Bowl and Depression days of the 1920s and 1930s proved sustained agriculture on Colorado's eastern plains unsupportable, and Chivington (like many other nearby towns) mostly died somewhere in those decades.

A few newer homes are still occupied in Chivington, but the town consists mostly of a few abandoned but still-standing ruins, more partially collapsed buildings (the former school house degrades, year-by-year), and many piles of bricks mark where the town once stood.

Standard green highway markers ("Chivington") identify what these ruins once were. The post office existed into the 1980s but nearby Eads today offers the nearest postal service and amenities like stores and gas stations.

Lamar is the closest remaining "significant" town on Colorado's eastern plains. Chivington appears to be returning, like much of eastern Colorado, to its sparse grassland and prairieland origins.

One of the former town's buildings contains a ghost sign asking for Chivington citizens to vote for a woman named Jan King, who ran for the office of Kiowa County clerk.

The famous TransAmerica Cycling Trail passes through Chivington and is frequented by hundreds of cyclists annually.

== See also ==
- List of populated places in Colorado
