= Weisbrod Memorial County Hospital =

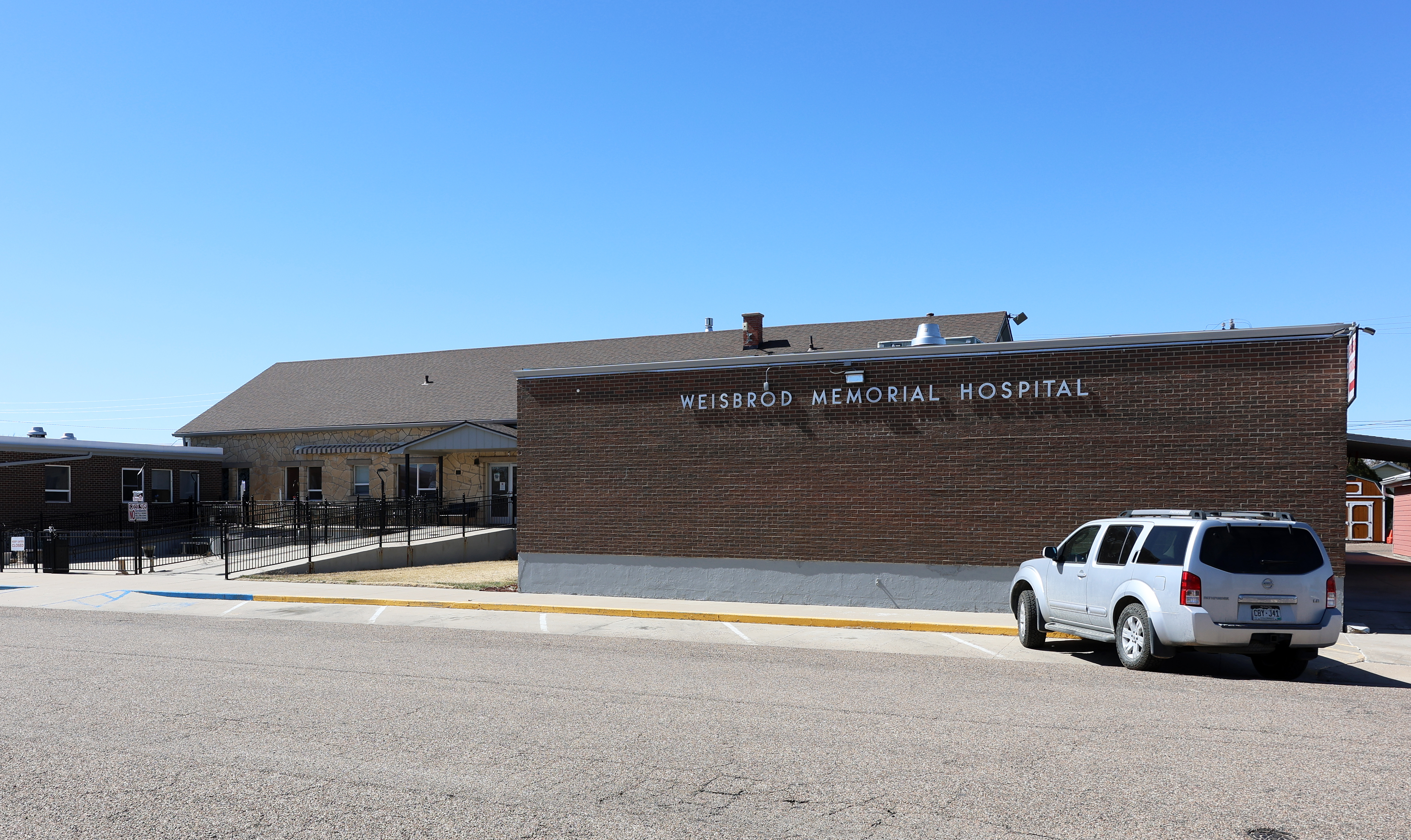
- The hospital's main façade and parking area

- The hospital's location in Colorado.

Geography
- Location: 1208 Luther Street; Eads, Colorado 81036, Kiowa County, Colorado, United States
- Coordinates: 38°28′49.06″N 102°47′5.29″W

Organization
- Care system: District hospital
- Type: Critical access hospital

Services
- Emergency department: yes
- Beds: 25

History
- Founded: 1963

Links
- Website: www.kchd.org
- Lists: Hospitals in Colorado

Weisbrod Memorial County Hospital is a critical access hospital in Eads, Colorado, in Kiowa County. The hospital is governed by a special district called Kiowa County Hospital District, with a publicly elected board of directors.

== History ==
Weisbrod Memorial County Hospital takes its name from George Weisbrod (died 1924), a Kiowa County resident who left his estate to the county to establish a hospital. The original hospital building was set to be constructed as a Works Project Administration project in 1937, but the Dust Bowl and World War II delayed its construction. It finally opened in 1943 as a county hospital. In 1963, the hospital was re-organized as a special district hospital. The hospital added new wings in the 1960s and in 1970. The Kiowa County Hospital District also owns and operates the Sandstone Heights Nursing Home.
