= Colorado State Highway 167 =

State highway in Colorado, United States

State Highway 167

Route information
- Maintained by CDOT
- Length: 4.860 mi (7.821 km)

Major junctions
- South end: CR 2 / CR JJ south of Fowler
- US 50 in Fowler
- North end: SH 96 north of Fowler

Location
- Country: United States
- State: Colorado
- Counties: Crowley, Otero

Highway system
- Colorado State Highway System; Interstate; US; State; Scenic
← SH 165	→ SH 170

State Highway 167 (SH 167) is a 4.86 mi-long (7.82 km) state highway near Fowler, Colorado. SH 167 begins at the intersection of County Road 2 and County Road JJ south of Fowler and ends at SH 96 north of Fowler.

== Route description ==
SH 167 runs for 4.860 miles (7.821 km), starting at the intersection of County Road 2 and County Road JJ south of Fowler. The highway goes north until it reaches CR LL west of Fowler. The highway then turns east until it passes by Fowler Jr/Sr High School and enters town as Grant Avenue. SH 167 then heads northeast through downtown and intersects U.S. Highway 50, then crosses the Arkansas River after it goes north of town. SH 167 then terminates at SH 96.

== Major intersections ==
County	Location	mi	km	Destinations	Notes
Otero		4.860	7.821	CR 2 south / CR JJ west	Roadway continues as CR 2
Otero	Fowler	1.673	2.692	US 50 (Cranston Avenue)	
Crowley		0.000	0.000	SH 96 – Boone, Ordway, Pueblo	
1.000 mi = 1.609 km; 1.000 km = 0.621 mi: Concurrency terminus
