= Great Plains Reservoirs =

Group of reservoirs in Colorado, United States

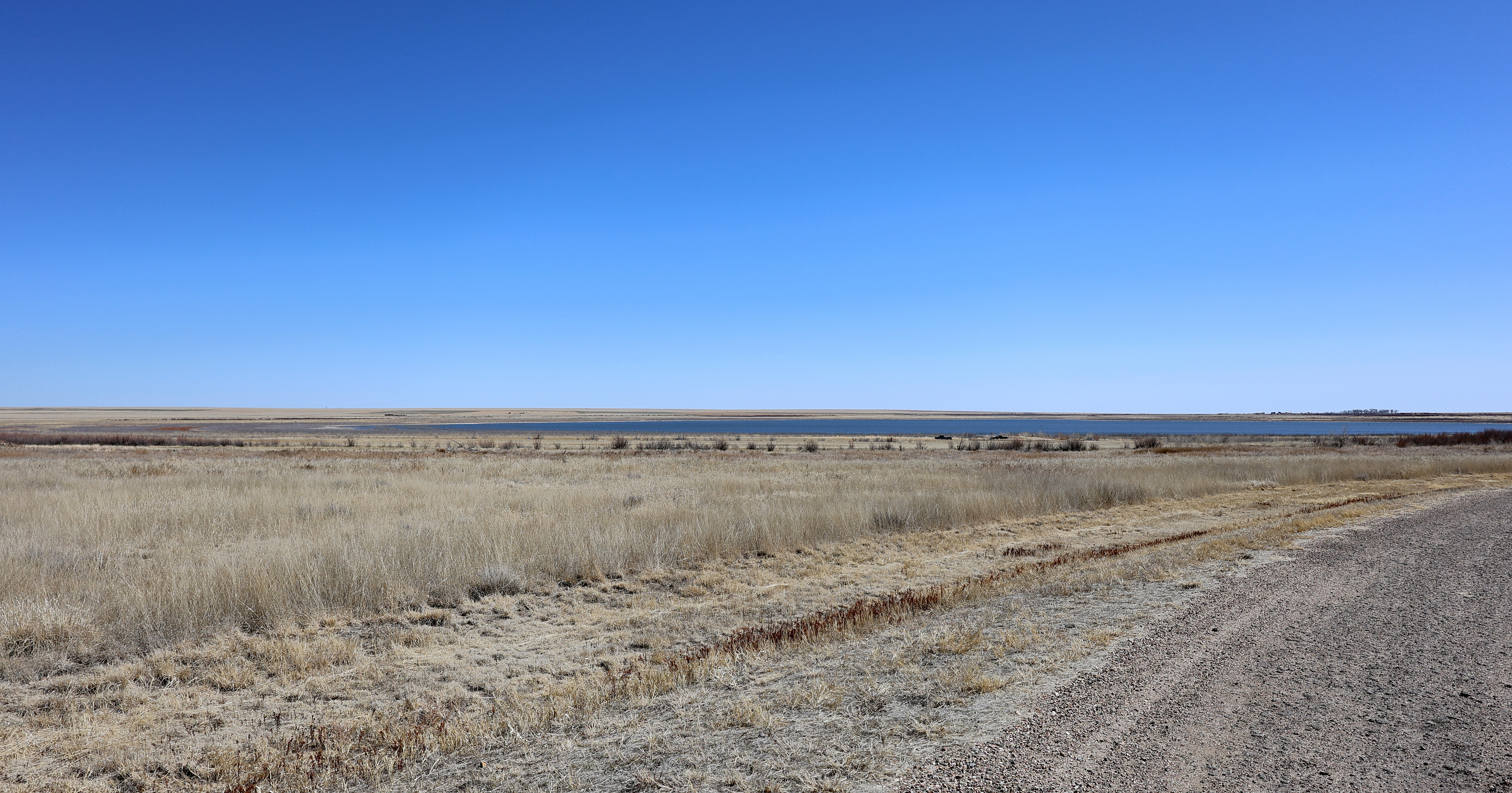
- Part of Neenoshe Reservoir (2024)

- The reservoirs' location in Colorado
- Location: Colorado
- Coordinates: 38°20′15.66″N 102°41′23.52″W
- Basin countries: United States

The Great Plains Reservoirs are a group of reservoirs along both sides of U.S. Highway 287 in Kiowa and Prowers counties in southeastern Colorado. Fed by canals, the reservoirs lie in naturally occurring depressions and store water for irrigation and recreational uses. The depressions vary in size from .6–5.0 square miles (1.6–12.9 square kilometers), and the water depths range from 13–25 feet (4.0–7.6 meters), but the water levels vary because the reservoirs are filled in spring and drawn down during the growing season.

== Names and individual reservoirs ==
The four largest reservoirs in the group have Cheyenne language names. They are Neegronda ('Big Water'), Neesopah ('Black Water'), Neeskah ('White Water' and also called Queens), and Neenoshe ('Standing Water'). The Cheyenne spellings vary, with some writers inserting a space after "Nee" (Cheyenne for 'water'), e.g., Nee Noshe.

The smaller reservoirs have English names. These include Mud Lake, King Reservoir, and Thurston Reservoir.

== Water supply ==
In the late 19th century, the Great Plains Water Company built a network of canals to deliver water to and fill the Great Plains Reservoirs. The extensive canal system draws water from the Arkansas River and includes the Fort Lyon, Kicking Bird, and Lone Wolf canals. The Holly, Colorado-based Amity Mutual Irrigation Company and the Bureau of Land Management currently manage the canals.

== Geology ==
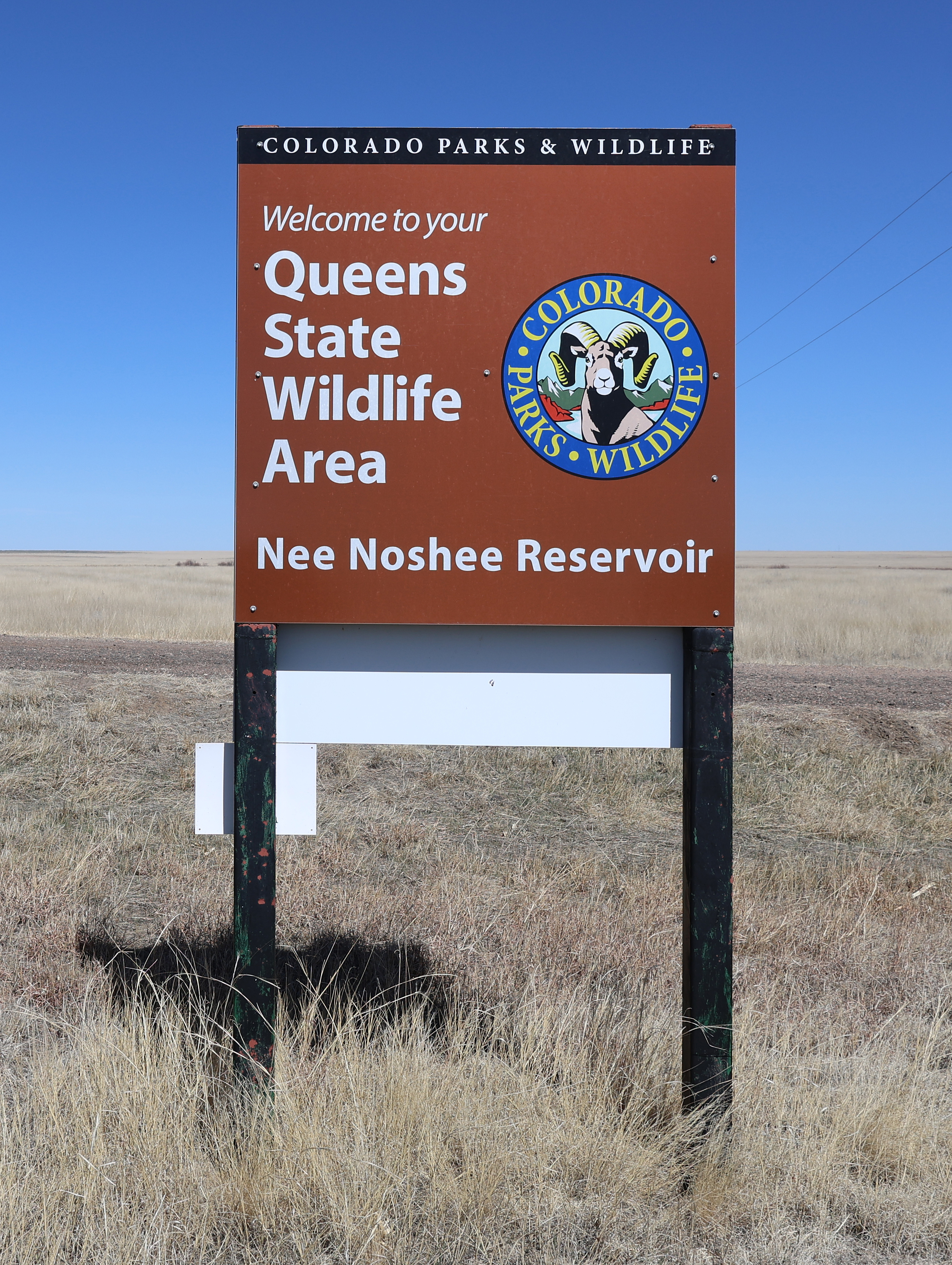
One of the state wildlife area signs

The depressions the reservoirs lie in were created when groundwater reached a deep layer of Flowerpot Formation salt and dissolved it, causing the strata above to sink. The salt layer was about 1,800–2,000 feet (550–610 meters) deep in the area of the reservoirs and was about 200–245 feet (61–75 meters) thick.

== Public lands ==
The reservoirs and much of the land around them are part of the Queens State Wildlife Area and the Queens State Trust Land.

In addition, the westernmost of the Great Plains Reservoirs, Neesopah Reservoir, is a stop on the Colorado Birding Trail, where horned larks, longspurs, and mountain plovers may be observed.
