= Arlington, Colorado =

Unincorporated community in Kiowa County, Colorado, United States

- unincorporated community
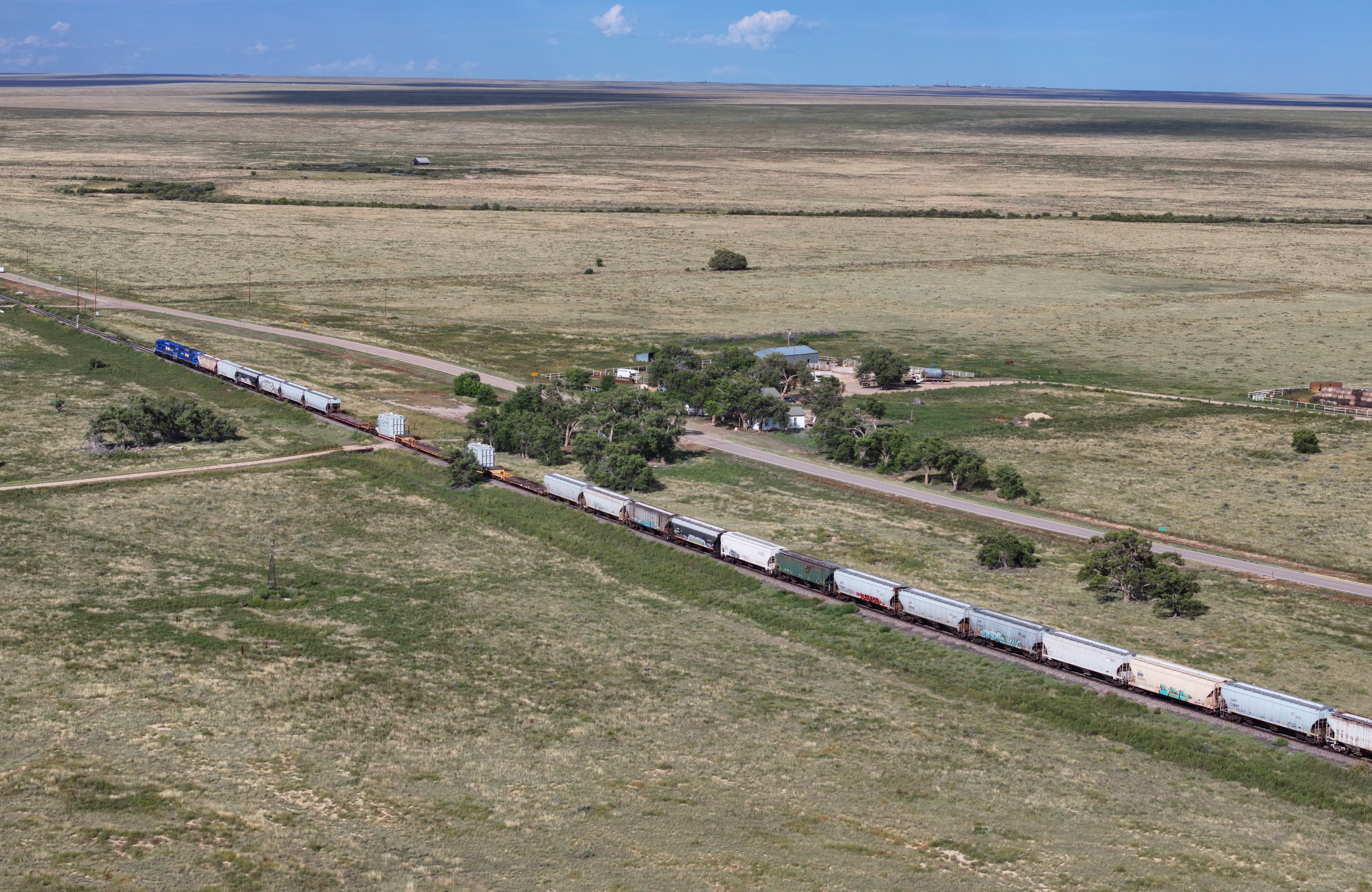
- A Colorado Pacific Railroad train passing through Arlington (2025)

- Location of Arlington, Colorado. Arlington (Colorado)
- Coordinates: 38°20′10″N 103°20′36″W
- Country: United States
- State: Colorado
- County: Kiowa
- Founded: 1887

Government
  - Type: Unincorporated community
  - Body: Kiowa County
- Elevation: 4,223 ft (1,287 m)
- Time zone: UTC−07:00 (MST)
  - Summer (DST): UTC−06:00 (MDT)
- ZIP Code: 81021
- Area code: 719
- GNIS pop ID: 204825

Arlington is an unincorporated community in Kiowa County, Colorado, United States.

== History ==
The town of Arlington was established by the Missouri Pacific Railroad in 1887. The Arlington, Colorado, post office operated from August 16, 1887, until October 15, 2011. The community's ZIP Code is 81021.

=== Arlington Auxiliary Army Airfield ===
Three miles east of town is the site of the former Arlingtion Auxiliary Army Air Field #4, one of many former Colorado World War II Army Airfields. The triangular shape of the runways is not only visible from the air, but also visible from the county road. The E/W runway still has large sections of asphalt and the vegetation has noticeable changes along the runway.

== See also ==
- List of populated places in Colorado
