= Karval, Colorado =

Unincorporated community in Colorado, US

- Unincorporated community
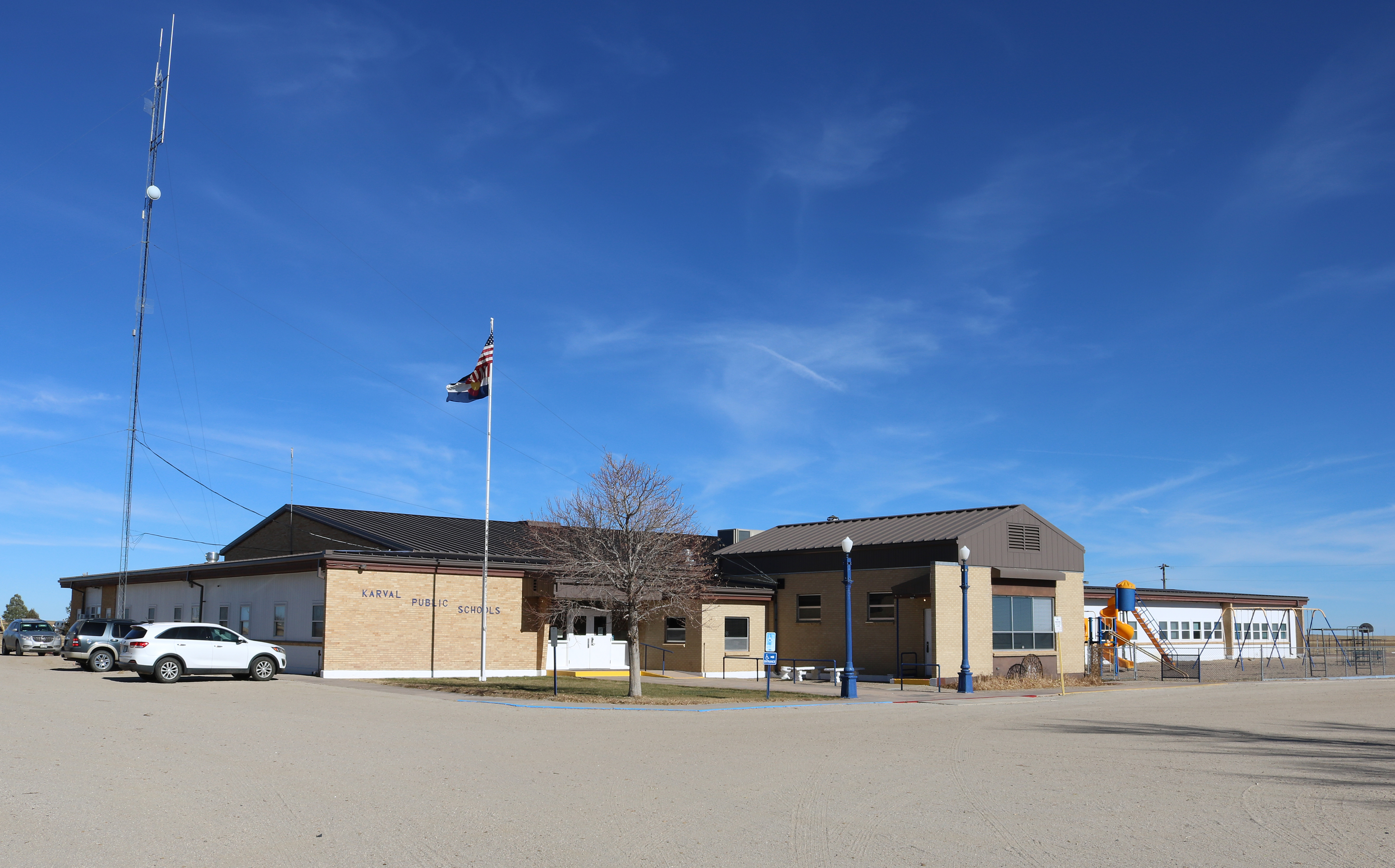
- Karval K–12 public school

- Location within Colorado Location within the United States
- Coordinates: 38°44′00″N 103°32′13″W
- Country: United States
- State: Colorado
- County: Lincoln
- Elevation: 5,115 ft (1,559 m)
- Time zone: UTC−7 (MST)
  - Summer (DST): UTC−6 (MDT)
- ZIP Code: 80823
- Area code: 719
- FIPS code: 08-40130
- GNIS ID: 196395

Karval is an unincorporated community in Lincoln County, Colorado, United States.

== History ==
The community derives its name from G. K. Kravig, a pioneer settler.

A post office called Karval has been in operation since 1911. The Karval Post Office has the ZIP Code 80823.

== Geography ==
=== Climate ===
According to the Köppen Climate Classification system, Karval has a cold semi-arid climate, abbreviated "BSk" on climate maps.

Climate data for Karval, Colorado, 1991–2020 normals, extremes 1980–present
Month	Jan	Feb	Mar	Apr	May	Jun	Jul	Aug	Sep	Oct	Nov	Dec	Year
Record high °F (°C)	77 (25)	80 (27)	90 (32)	91 (33)	98 (37)	104 (40)	106 (41)	104 (40)	100 (38)	94 (34)	83 (28)	78 (26)	106 (41)
Mean maximum °F (°C)	68.1 (20.1)	69.6 (20.9)	77.0 (25.0)	82.5 (28.1)	89.7 (32.1)	86.2 (30.1)	98.5 (36.9)	96.7 (35.9)	93.3 (34.1)	86.3 (30.2)	74.3 (23.5)	66.9 (19.4)	99.7 (37.6)
Mean daily maximum °F (°C)	45.6 (7.6)	47.6 (8.7)	56.4 (13.6)	63.7 (17.6)	72.5 (22.5)	83.7 (28.7)	88.9 (31.6)	86.4 (30.2)	79.7 (26.5)	66.8 (19.3)	54.1 (12.3)	44.9 (7.2)	65.9 (18.8)
Daily mean °F (°C)	30.4 (−0.9)	32.2 (0.1)	40.6 (4.8)	47.6 (8.7)	57.2 (14.0)	67.9 (19.9)	73.3 (22.9)	71.1 (21.7)	63.3 (17.4)	50.3 (10.2)	38.6 (3.7)	30.2 (−1.0)	50.2 (10.1)
Mean daily minimum °F (°C)	15.2 (−9.3)	16.9 (−8.4)	24.8 (−4.0)	31.6 (−0.2)	41.9 (5.5)	52.1 (11.2)	57.6 (14.2)	55.8 (13.2)	46.9 (8.3)	33.8 (1.0)	23.1 (−4.9)	15.6 (−9.1)	34.6 (1.5)
Mean minimum °F (°C)	−1.1 (−18.4)	0.1 (−17.7)	10.1 (−12.2)	19.4 (−7.0)	29.2 (−1.6)	42.9 (6.1)	50.9 (10.5)	49.4 (9.7)	35.7 (2.1)	18.0 (−7.8)	8.0 (−13.3)	−1.7 (−18.7)	−7.6 (−22.0)
Record low °F (°C)	−29 (−34)	−24 (−31)	−5 (−21)	6 (−14)	20 (−7)	31 (−1)	43 (6)	41 (5)	18 (−8)	−4 (−20)	−12 (−24)	−28 (−33)	−29 (−34)
Average precipitation inches (mm)	0.18 (4.6)	0.24 (6.1)	0.68 (17)	1.26 (32)	1.93 (49)	1.85 (47)	2.98 (76)	2.34 (59)	1.09 (28)	0.99 (25)	0.31 (7.9)	0.23 (5.8)	14.08 (357.4)
Average snowfall inches (cm)	3.1 (7.9)	3.1 (7.9)	4.0 (10)	2.4 (6.1)	0.2 (0.51)	0.0 (0.0)	0.0 (0.0)	0.0 (0.0)	0.0 (0.0)	2.1 (5.3)	2.7 (6.9)	3.4 (8.6)	21.0 (53)
Average precipitation days (≥ 0.01 in)	2.4	2.5	4.2	4.7	6.7	6.7	8.7	7.7	4.1	3.8	2.6	2.7	56.8
Average snowy days (≥ 0.1 in)	2.1	2.1	2.0	1.3	0.1	0.0	0.0	0.0	0.0	0.6	1.7	2.3	12.2
Source 1: NOAA
Source 2: National Weather Service
