= Kiowa County, Colorado =

County in Colorado, United States

- County
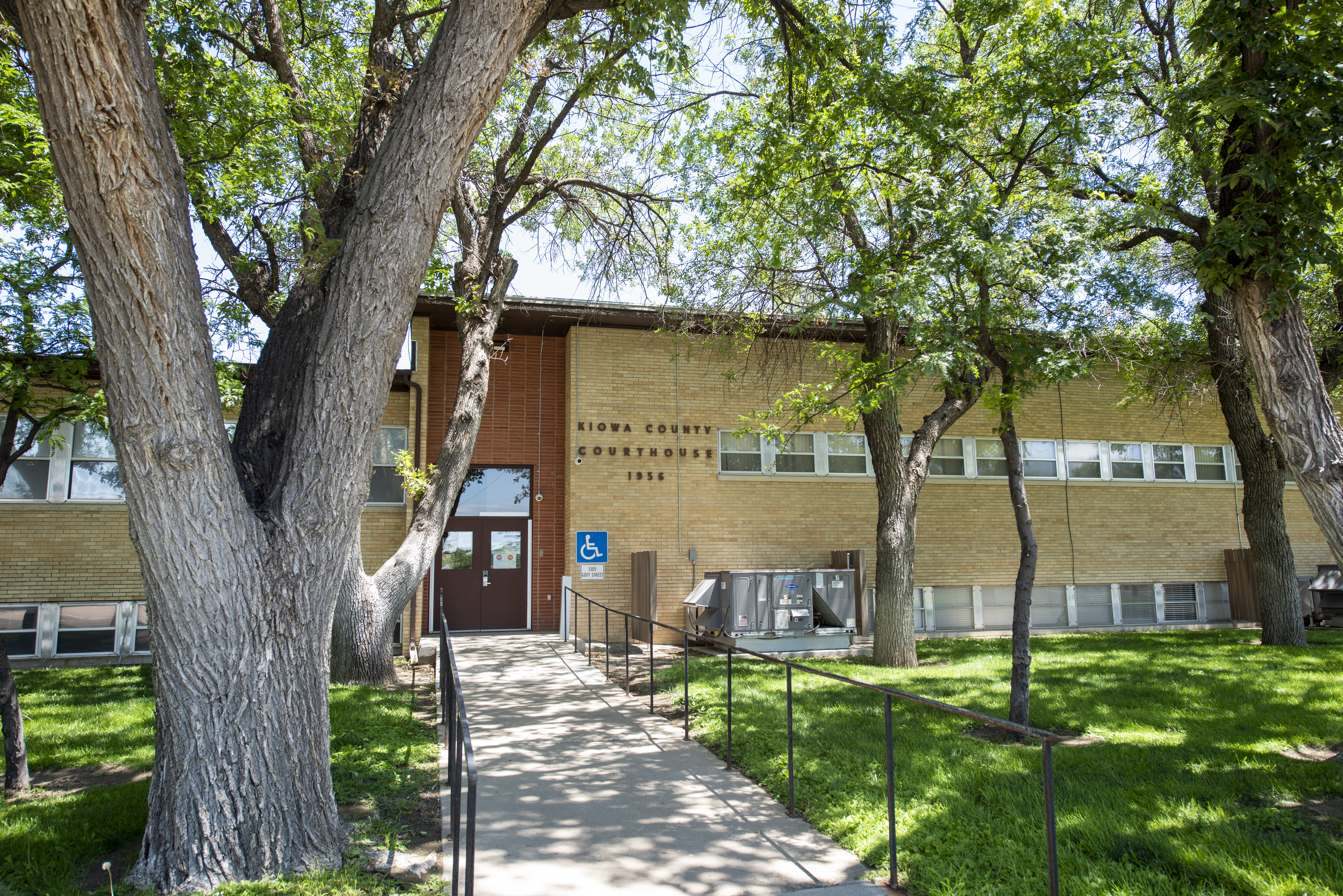
- Kiowa County Courthouse

- Location within the U.S. state of Colorado
- Coordinates: 38.43°N 102.74°W
- Country: United States
- State: Colorado
- Founded: April 11, 1889
- Named for: Kiowa Nation
- Seat: Eads
- Largest town: Eads

Area
  - Total: 1,786 sq mi (4,630 km^{2})
  - Land: 1,768 sq mi (4,580 km^{2})
  - Water: 18 sq mi (47 km^{2}) 1.0%

Population (2020)
  - Total: 1,446
  - Estimate (2025): 1,412 ▼
  - Density: 0.8179/sq mi (0.3158/km^{2})
- Time zone: UTC−7 (Mountain)
  - Summer (DST): UTC−6 (MDT)
- Congressional district: 4th
- Website: kiowacounty.colorado.gov

Kiowa County is a county located in the U.S. state of Colorado. As of the 2020 census, the population was 1,446, making it the fifth-least populous county in Colorado. The county seat is Eads. The county was named for the Kiowa Nation of Native Americans.

== History ==
=== Sand Creek massacre ===
On November 29, 1864, more than a decade before Colorado became a state and long before Kiowa County was formed, a massacre of Native Americans—a group of old men, women, and children—occurred on Sand Creek that initially was greeted as a victory in the Colorado War against hostile Indians; within months, Congressional inquiries revealed a different picture, and a national scandal erupted. It happened in what is now Kiowa County and is known as the Sand Creek Massacre.

Territorial Governor John Evans eventually lost his job for his part in setting up the incident, and Colonel John Chivington, commander of the U.S. forces, was castigated by the United States Congress, and the scandal followed him for the rest of his life. Evans would go on to make significant important contributions to the early Denver community, and while Chivington also made some, his reputation remained tainted, while Evans is still honored today.

The location was not positively identified until 1999, and in 2005, the National Park Service established the Sand Creek Massacre National Historic Site. Currently, the facilities include a small visitor center, two walking trails, signage, and monuments overlooking the massacre site. The massacre site itself is off-limits to visitors.

=== Railroad and agriculture in the 1880s ===
In the late 1880s, eastern Colorado attracted a lot of attention by farming interests that did not yet know that long-term agriculture was unsustainable in this arid landscape, and the railroads were snaking west across the plains towards the gold fields of the Rocky Mountains during the Colorado Gold Rush. The Missouri Pacific Railroad crossed into what would soon become Kiowa County, Colorado, from Kansas in 1887.

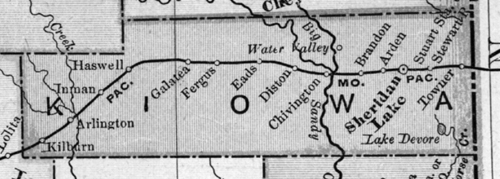
Kiowa County, 1898

Several small camps for railroad workers were established just over the border from Kansas, and beginning after the town of Sheridan Lake, new towns and camps were sequentially named, alphabetically, starting with "A" and proceeding westward along the railroad line.

Arden, Brandon, Chivington, Diston, Eads, Fergus, Galatea, Haswell, Inman, Joliet, and Kilburn appeared one after another, some developing into towns, others being only a pipe dream in the eyes of developers. Chivington was intended as a major watering stop for the railroad (a 60-room, $10,000 "crown jewel" hotel was initially built there), but the water was too alkaline to use and the trains instead stopped in Kansas to tank up. The hotel was soon torn down, its materials shipped to other Colorado locations to use in constructing other facilities—a common occurrence in late 19th century Colorado, as boom towns went bust.

Kiowa County was established in 1889, taking its name from the Kiowa Indians who lived in eastern Colorado before the Europeans arrived. Sheridan Lake was the county seat of Kiowa County and was not at first a stop on the railroad line; only after local citizens built a railroad depot and turned it over to the Missouri Pacific did the railroad build a telegraph station and make Sheridan Lake a stop. The county seat moved to rival Eads in 1902.

=== Kiowa County today ===
Agriculture in eastern Colorado collapsed in the Dust Bowl days of the 1930s; today mostly dry-land farms and some ranching interests survive. Colorado's Front Range cities and agriculture interests upstream have acquired most of the water rights, and the groundwater aquifers are drying up. Kiowa County faces ever-decreasing water supplies and further economic decline.

It is conceivable that much of the county will eventually revert to its original sparse grassland and prairie conditions of the pre-1880s.

Today Eads, along the old railroad line, is the largest town in the county. It is the Kiowa county seat, serves the surviving farming and ranching interests, and hosts the county's largest high school. Sheridan Lake does have a combined junior-and-senior high, and still surviving in some form are the towns of Towner, Arlington, Brandon, Chivington, and Haswell.

Eads is also the location of the county's chief hospital, Weisbrod Memorial County Hospital.

== Geography ==
According to the U.S. Census Bureau, the county has a total area of 1,786 square miles (4,630 km^{2}), of which 1,768 square miles (4,580 km^{2}) is land and 18 square miles (47 km^{2}) (1.0%) is water.

Significant drainage basins in the county are Adobe Creek and Mustang Creek which drain the county's western part, Rush Creek and Big Sandy Creek in the central part and Wildhorse, Buffalo, and White Woman creeks in the eastern part. The draws tend to be intermittent, however Adobe, Rush and Big Sandy creeks have small continuous flows during wetter years. Each of these creeks ultimately drains to the Arkansas River.

The Great Plains Reservoirs south of Eads and along both sides U.S. Highway 287 are a group of four larger reservoirs and several smaller ones that supply irrigation water to local farms and offer hunting, fishing and wildlife viewing in the Queens State Wildlife Area.

=== Adjacent counties ===
- Cheyenne County - north
- Greeley County, Kansas - east
- Bent County - south
- Prowers County - south
- Otero County - southwest
- Crowley County - west
- Lincoln County - northwest

=== Major highways ===
- U.S. Highway 287
- U.S. Highway 385
- State Highway 96

=== National protected area ===
- Sand Creek Massacre National Historic Site

=== Bicycle route ===
- TransAmerica Trail Bicycle Route

== Demographics ==
Historical population
Census	Pop.	Note	%±
1890	1,243		—
1900	701		−43.6%
1910	2,899		313.6%
1920	3,755		29.5%
1930	3,786		0.8%
1940	2,793		−26.2%
1950	3,003		7.5%
1960	2,425		−19.2%
1970	2,029		−16.3%
1980	1,936		−4.6%
1990	1,688		−12.8%
2000	1,622		−3.9%
2010	1,398		−13.8%
2020	1,446		3.4%
2025 (est.)	1,412	▼	−2.4%
U.S. Decennial Census; 1790-1960 1900-1990; 1990-2000 2010-2020

=== 2020 census ===
As of the 2020 census, the county had a population of 1,446. Of the residents, 24.0% were under the age of 18 and 22.8% were 65 years of age or older; the median age was 44.0 years.

For every 100 females there were 97.0 males, and for every 100 females age 18 and over there were 93.1 males. 0.0% of residents lived in urban areas and 100.0% lived in rural areas.

Kiowa County, Colorado – Racial and ethnic composition Note: the US Census treats Hispanic/Latino as an ethnic category. This table excludes Latinos from the racial categories and assigns them to a separate category. Hispanics/Latinos may be of any race.
Race / Ethnicity (NH = Non-Hispanic)	Pop 2000	Pop 2010	Pop 2020	% 2000	% 2010	% 2020
White alone (NH)	1,530	1,304	1,247	94.33%	93.28%	86.24%
Black or African American alone (NH)	8	3	3	0.49%	0.21%	0.21%
Native American or Alaska Native alone (NH)	18	3	0	1.11%	0.21%	0.00%
Asian alone (NH)	0	0	9	0.00%	0.00%	0.62%
Pacific Islander alone (NH)	1	0	1	0.06%	0.00%	0.07%
Other race alone (NH)	3	0	1	0.18%	0.07%	0.07%
Mixed race or Multiracial (NH)	11	10	81	0.68%	0.72%	5.60%
Hispanic or Latino (any race)	51	78	104	3.14%	5.58%	7.19%
Total	1,622	1,398	1,446	100.00%	100.00%	100.00%

The racial makeup of the county was 89.2% White, 0.3% Black or African American, 0.0% American Indian and Alaska Native, 0.6% Asian, 0.1% Native Hawaiian and Pacific Islander, 1.4% from some other race, and 8.4% from two or more races. Hispanic or Latino residents of any race comprised 7.2% of the population.

There were 581 households in the county, of which 27.5% had children under the age of 18 living with them and 24.4% had a female householder with no spouse or partner present. About 28.3% of all households were made up of individuals and 15.1% had someone living alone who was 65 years of age or older.

There were 736 housing units, of which 21.1% were vacant. Among occupied housing units, 72.8% were owner-occupied and 27.2% were renter-occupied. The homeowner vacancy rate was 0.5% and the rental vacancy rate was 9.0%.

=== 2000 census ===
As of the census of 2000, there were 1,622 people, 665 households, and 452 families residing in the county. The population density was 1 people per square mile (0.39 people/km^{2}). There were 817 housing units at an average density of 0.457 units per square mile (0.176 units/km^{2}). The racial makeup of the county was 96.12% White, 0.49% Black or African American, 1.11% Native American, 0.06% Pacific Islander, 1.42% from other races, and 0.80% from two or more races. 3.14% of the population were Hispanic or Latino of any race.

There were 665 households, out of which 28.90% had children under the age of 18 living with them, 57.60% were married couples living together, 6.60% had a female householder with no husband present, and 32.00% were non-families. 29.80% of all households were made up of individuals, and 15.20% had someone living alone who was 65 years of age or older. The average household size was 2.40 and the average family size was 2.97.

In the county, the population was spread out, with 25.90% under the age of 18, 7.30% from 18 to 24, 24.70% from 25 to 44, 24.60% from 45 to 64, and 17.60% who were 65 years of age or older. The median age was 40 years. For every 100 females, there were 100.00 males. For every 100 females age 18 and over, there were 97.40 males.

The median income for a household in the county was $30,494, and the median income for a family was $35,536. Males had a median income of $26,136 versus $18,897 for females. The per capita income for the county was $16,382. About 9.60% of families and 12.20% of the population were below the poverty line, including 11.50% of those under age 18 and 13.80% of those age 65 or over.

Over six percent of the population were Quakers–one of the highest percentages in the country.

== Politics ==
United States presidential election results for Kiowa County, Colorado
Year	Republican		Democratic		Third party(ies)	
Year	No.	%	No.	%	No.	%
1892	151	53.55%	0	0.00%	131	46.45%
1896	133	45.86%	155	53.45%	2	0.69%
1900	151	50.84%	144	48.48%	2	0.67%
1904	180	56.60%	124	38.99%	14	4.40%
1908	474	51.97%	406	44.52%	32	3.51%
1912	273	18.32%	638	42.82%	579	38.86%
1916	723	39.57%	936	51.23%	168	9.20%
1920	864	59.63%	521	35.96%	64	4.42%
1924	805	47.49%	431	25.43%	459	27.08%
1928	1,024	67.59%	458	30.23%	33	2.18%
1932	769	39.08%	1,113	56.55%	86	4.37%
1936	772	44.57%	918	53.00%	42	2.42%
1940	986	61.86%	598	37.52%	10	0.63%
1944	970	64.75%	522	34.85%	6	0.40%
1948	758	52.97%	659	46.05%	14	0.98%
1952	1,047	70.84%	412	27.88%	19	1.29%
1956	810	64.64%	443	35.36%	0	0.00%
1960	865	63.42%	498	36.51%	1	0.07%
1964	579	45.23%	701	54.77%	0	0.00%
1968	689	56.29%	423	34.56%	112	9.15%
1972	849	67.92%	372	29.76%	29	2.32%
1976	598	52.59%	529	46.53%	10	0.88%
1980	754	65.06%	331	28.56%	74	6.38%
1984	850	75.22%	265	23.45%	15	1.33%
1988	645	61.25%	398	37.80%	10	0.95%
1992	472	45.83%	290	28.16%	268	26.02%
1996	549	61.96%	246	27.77%	91	10.27%
2000	728	75.21%	211	21.80%	29	3.00%
2004	712	79.82%	172	19.28%	8	0.90%
2008	650	76.29%	178	20.89%	24	2.82%
2012	677	82.46%	118	14.37%	26	3.17%
2016	728	85.15%	91	10.64%	36	4.21%
2020	795	88.04%	98	10.85%	10	1.11%
2024	744	86.21%	102	11.82%	17	1.97%

United States Senate election results for Kiowa County, Colorado2
Year	Republican		Democratic		Third party(ies)	
Year	No.	%	No.	%	No.	%
2020	783	87.98%	93	10.45%	14	1.57%

United States Senate election results for Kiowa County, Colorado3
Year	Republican		Democratic		Third party(ies)	
Year	No.	%	No.	%	No.	%
2022	602	80.37%	120	16.02%	27	3.60%

Colorado Gubernatorial election results for Kiowa County
Year	Republican		Democratic		Third party(ies)	
Year	No.	%	No.	%	No.	%
2022	562	49.52%	475	41.85%	98	8.63%

Kiowa is, like all of the High Plains, an overwhelmingly Republican county. The last Democrat to carry it was Lyndon Johnson in 1964, and since 1980, only Michael Dukakis in 1988 –during a major farm crisis brought upon by drought– has topped 30% of the county's vote for the Democratic Party. The past six Democratic candidates for president have not surpassed 22% of the county's vote, and both Hillary Clinton and Joe Biden barely reached ten percent.

== Communities ==
=== Towns ===
- Eads
- Haswell
- Sheridan Lake

=== Census-designated places ===
- Brandon
- Towner

=== Other unincorporated places ===
- Arlington
- Chivington

== See also ==
- Bibliography of Colorado
- Geography of Colorado
- History of Colorado
  - National Register of Historic Places listings in Kiowa County, Colorado
- Index of Colorado-related articles
- List of Colorado-related lists
  - List of counties in Colorado
- Outline of Colorado
