= Sheridan Lake, Colorado =

Town in Colorado, United States

- Town
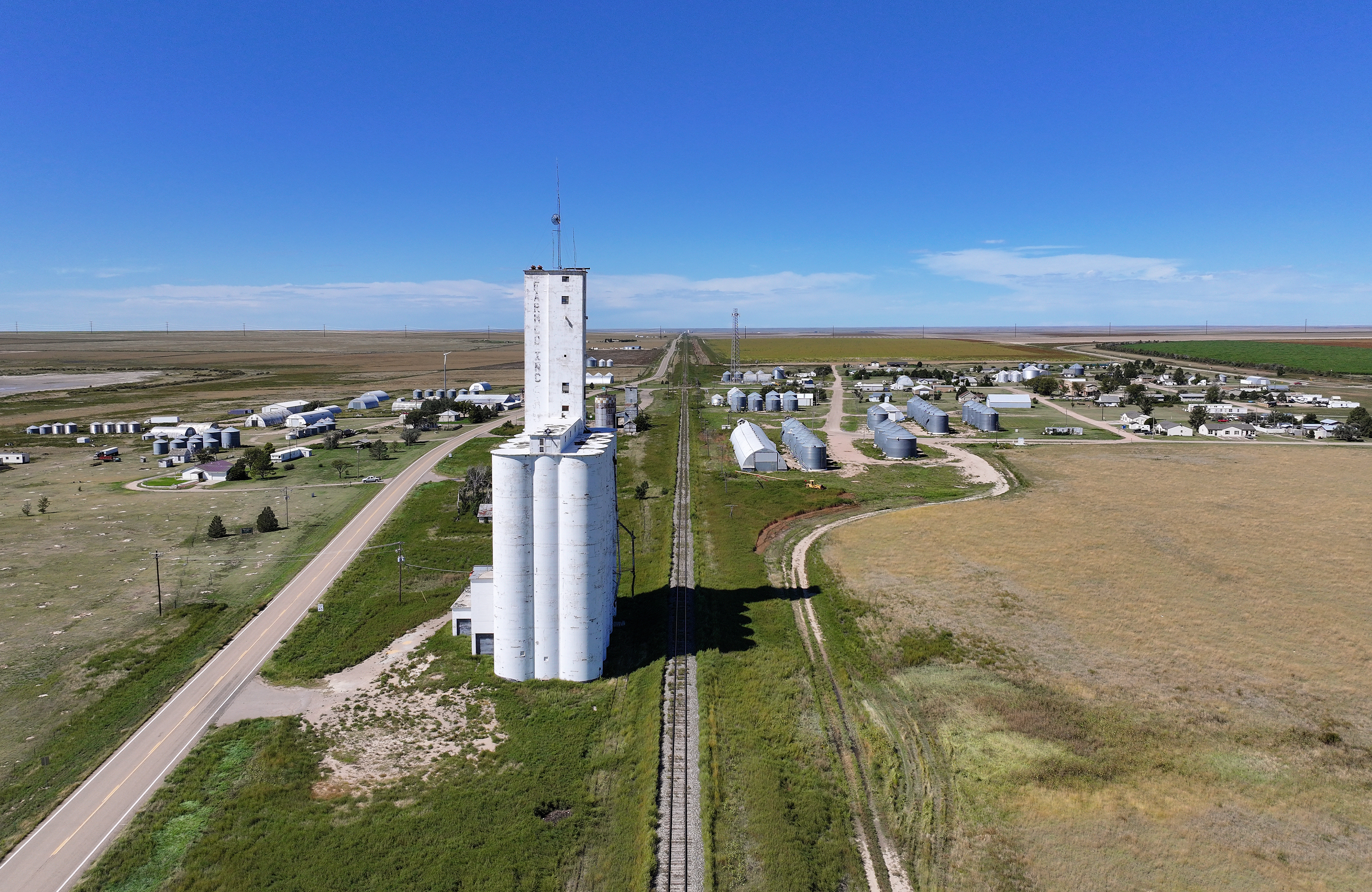
- Sheridan Lake (2025)

- Location within Kiowa County and Colorado
- Coordinates: 38°28′00″N 102°17′32″W
- Country: United States
- State: Colorado
- County: Kiowa
- Incorporated: 1951-06-11

Area
  - Total: 0.31 sq mi (0.80 km^{2})
  - Land: 0.31 sq mi (0.80 km^{2})
  - Water: 0 sq mi (0.00 km^{2})
- Elevation: 4,072 ft (1,241 m)

Population (2020)
  - Total: 55
  - Density: 180/sq mi (69/km^{2})
- Time zone: UTC−7 (MST)
  - Summer (DST): UTC−6 (MDT)
- ZIP Code: 81071
- Area code: 719
- FIPS code: 08-69700
- GNIS ID: 2413280
- Website: Sheridan webpage

Sheridan Lake is a statutory town located in Kiowa County, Colorado, United States. The population was 55 at the 2020 census.

== History ==
The Bee, Colorado, post office opened on August 18, 1887, but was renamed Sheridan Lake on October 27, 1887. The community was named after Phil Sheridan, a pioneer hunter.

== Geography ==
Colorado Pacific Railroad in Sheridan Lake

Sheridan Lake is located in eastern Kiowa County. U.S. Route 385 passes through the town, leading north 27 miles (43 km) to Cheyenne Wells and south 28 miles (45 km) to Granada. Colorado State Highway 96 is the town's Main Street and leads west 28 miles (45 km) to Eads, the Kiowa county seat, and east 13 miles (21 km) to the Kansas border.

According to the United States Census Bureau, the town has a total area of 0.32 square miles (0.82 km^{2}), all of it recorded as land. The town is situated just to the north of the site of the small lake for which it was named. Recent aerial photos appear to indicate that the lake is mostly dried-up, with only an alkali lake bed remaining.

The Thunderbird gas station is home to Sheridan Lake's only restaurant. The town also has an auto repair shop and graphic design studio.

== Demographics ==
Historical population
Census	Pop.	Note	%±
1960	90		—
1970	86		−4.4%
1980	87		1.2%
1990	95		9.2%
2000	66		−30.5%
2010	88		33.3%
2020	55		−37.5%
U.S. Decennial Census

== See also ==
- List of municipalities in Colorado
