= Eads, Colorado =

Statutory town in Kiowa County, Colorado, United States

- Statutory town
- Town of Eads
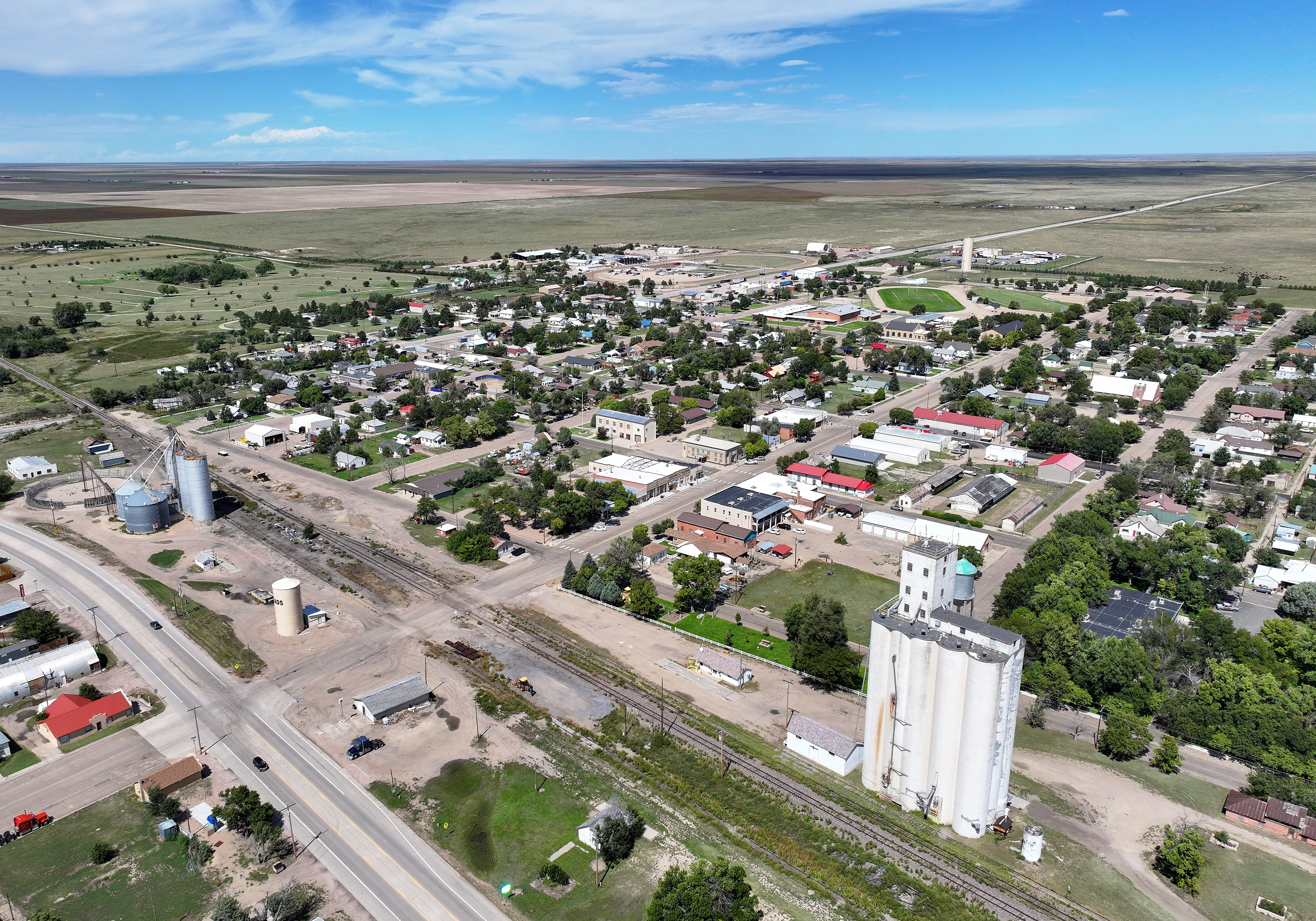
- Aerial view (2025)

- Location within Kiowa County and Colorado

- Location of the Town of Eads, Colorado. Eads (Colorado)
- Coordinates: 38°28′54″N 102°46′47″W
- Country: United States
- State: Colorado
- County: Kiowa
- Founded: 1887
- Incorporated: January 29, 1916

Government
  - Type: statutory town

Area
  - Total: 0.478 sq mi (1.237 km^{2})
  - Land: 0.478 sq mi (1.237 km^{2})
  - Water: 0 sq mi (0.000 km^{2})
- Elevation: 4,219 ft (1,286 m)

Population (2020)
  - Total: 672
  - Density: 1,410/sq mi (543/km^{2})
- Time zone: UTC−07:00 (MST)
  - Summer (DST): UTC−06:00 (MDT)
- ZIP code: 81036
- Area code: 719
- GNIS town ID: 2412454
- FIPS code: 08-22145
- Website: eadspd.org

Eads is the statutory town that is the county seat and the most populous municipality of Kiowa County, Colorado, United States. The town population was 672 at the 2020 United States census.

== History ==
Eads was established in 1887 as a railroad town and was named after James Buchanan Eads, a structural engineer with the Missouri Pacific Railroad, who designed and built the Eads Bridge over the Mississippi River at St. Louis in 1874 and went on to design and build the system of levees on the Mississippi Delta which made the river navigable by ocean-going vessels. The Eads, Colorado, post office opened on November 18, 1887. Kiowa County was created on April 11, 1889, and Eads was made the county seat in 1902. The Town of Eads was incorporated on January 29, 1916.

In the town, there are many historic houses and buildings that are still in use to this day; on Maine Street, there are many places to visit to learn more about the town's history. Since 2007, there is an annual event where the local businesses of Eads are supported called the Maine street bash; it includes many activities and live performances.

The original name of Eads was Dayton.

== Geography ==
Eads is located in Kiowa County at coordinates 38.4806°N 102.7819°E and elevation 4,219 feet (1,286 m)."Eads, Colorado". Geographic Names Information System. United States Geological Survey, United States Department of the Interior.</ref> At the 2020 United States census, the town had a total area of 306 acres (1.237 km^{2}), all of it land.

=== Climate ===
Eads location in the eastern portion of Colorado gives it a Cold semi-arid climate (Köppen BSk) featuring warm to hot dry sometimes wet summers and cold sometimes snowy winters.

Climate data for Eads, Colorado (1991–2020 normals, extremes 1907–present)
Month	Jan	Feb	Mar	Apr	May	Jun	Jul	Aug	Sep	Oct	Nov	Dec	Year
Record high °F (°C)	78 (26)	84 (29)	90 (32)	99 (37)	106 (41)	110 (43)	110 (43)	108 (42)	107 (42)	96 (36)	86 (30)	78 (26)	110 (43)
Mean maximum °F (°C)	66.3 (19.1)	70.5 (21.4)	80.4 (26.9)	86.4 (30.2)	93.2 (34.0)	100.2 (37.9)	101.7 (38.7)	99.0 (37.2)	95.7 (35.4)	88.5 (31.4)	76.2 (24.6)	66.6 (19.2)	103.0 (39.4)
Mean daily maximum °F (°C)	44.8 (7.1)	47.6 (8.7)	58.0 (14.4)	65.6 (18.7)	75.4 (24.1)	86.6 (30.3)	91.2 (32.9)	88.6 (31.4)	81.5 (27.5)	68.5 (20.3)	55.0 (12.8)	45.0 (7.2)	67.3 (19.6)
Daily mean °F (°C)	30.3 (−0.9)	33.2 (0.7)	42.6 (5.9)	50.3 (10.2)	60.7 (15.9)	71.5 (21.9)	76.4 (24.7)	74.2 (23.4)	66.1 (18.9)	52.6 (11.4)	40.0 (4.4)	30.8 (−0.7)	52.4 (11.3)
Mean daily minimum °F (°C)	15.9 (−8.9)	18.8 (−7.3)	27.2 (−2.7)	35.0 (1.7)	46.0 (7.8)	56.5 (13.6)	61.6 (16.4)	59.8 (15.4)	50.8 (10.4)	36.8 (2.7)	25.0 (−3.9)	16.6 (−8.6)	37.5 (3.1)
Mean minimum °F (°C)	−1.1 (−18.4)	1.2 (−17.1)	11.2 (−11.6)	21.2 (−6.0)	33.1 (0.6)	46.0 (7.8)	54.3 (12.4)	52.3 (11.3)	37.8 (3.2)	21.8 (−5.7)	8.7 (−12.9)	−1.6 (−18.7)	−7.2 (−21.8)
Record low °F (°C)	−29 (−34)	−24 (−31)	−21 (−29)	4 (−16)	17 (−8)	30 (−1)	36 (2)	38 (3)	20 (−7)	1 (−17)	−12 (−24)	−24 (−31)	−29 (−34)
Average precipitation inches (mm)	0.26 (6.6)	0.42 (11)	0.78 (20)	1.76 (45)	2.13 (54)	2.02 (51)	2.92 (74)	2.53 (64)	0.86 (22)	1.22 (31)	0.41 (10)	0.39 (9.9)	15.70 (399)
Average snowfall inches (cm)	2.5 (6.4)	3.4 (8.6)	1.9 (4.8)	0.6 (1.5)	0.2 (0.51)	0.0 (0.0)	0.0 (0.0)	0.0 (0.0)	0.0 (0.0)	0.2 (0.51)	2.4 (6.1)	2.7 (6.9)	13.9 (35)
Average precipitation days (≥ 0.01 in)	3.0	3.3	4.3	5.5	6.8	6.3	7.5	6.8	3.9	4.0	2.8	3.1	57.3
Average snowy days (≥ 0.1 in)	1.2	1.5	0.9	0.3	0.1	0.0	0.0	0.0	0.0	0.2	0.8	0.9	5.9
Source: NOAA

== Demographics ==
Historical population
Census	Pop.	Note	%±
1920	406		—
1930	518		27.6%
1940	700		35.1%
1950	1,015		45.0%
1960	929		−8.5%
1970	795		−14.4%
1980	878		10.4%
1990	780		−11.2%
2000	747		−4.2%
2010	609		−18.5%
2020	672		10.3%
U.S. Decennial Census

As of the census of 2000, there were 747 people, 320 households, and 193 families residing in the town. The population density was 1,579.7 inhabitants per square mile (609.9/km^{2}). There were 389 housing units at an average density of 822.6 per square mile (317.6/km^{2}). The racial makeup of the town was 95.85% White, 0.67% African American, 0.80% Native American, 1.47% from other races, and 1.20% from two or more races. Hispanic or Latino of any race were 2.95% of the population.

There were 320 households, out of which 25.3% had children under the age of 18 living with them, 50.0% were married couples living together, 7.5% had a female householder with no husband present, and 39.4% were non-families. 35.6% of all households were made up of individuals, and 20.3% had someone living alone who was 65 years of age or older. The average household size was 2.26 and the average family size was 2.93.

In the town, the population was spread out, with 23.4% under the age of 18, 7.5% from 18 to 24, 24.1% from 25 to 44, 23.2% from 45 to 64, and 21.8% who were 65 years of age or older. The median age was 41 years. For every 100 females, there were 99.7 males. For every 100 females age 18 and over, there were 93.2 males.

The median income for a household in the town was $27,024, and the median income for a family was $35,625. Males had a median income of $29,375 versus $19,792 for females. The per capita income for the town was $16,944. About 7.0% of families and 12.0% of the population were below the poverty line, including 15.8% of those under age 18 and 13.5% of those age 65 or over.

== Education ==
Eads lies in Kiowa County School District RE-1 (also called Eads School District RE-1), one of two school districts in Kiowa County. The district operates three schools: Eads Elementary School (Pre-K-5th grade), Eads Middle School (6th-8th grades), and Eads High School (9th-12th grades). In the 2025–2026 school year, the elementary school had 126 students, the middle school had 43 students, and the high school had 48 students.

== Health care ==
Weisbrod Memorial County Hospital serves Eads and Kiowa County.

== See also ==
- List of county seats in Colorado
