= 1968 United States presidential election in Colorado =

- November 5, 1968

Nominee	Richard Nixon	Hubert Humphrey	George Wallace
Party	Republican	Democratic	American Independent
Home state	New York (Note: Although he was born in California and he served as a U.S. senator from California, in 1968 Richard Nixon's official state of residence was New York, because he moved there to practice law after his defeat in the 1962 California gubernatorial election. During his first term as president, Nixon re-established his residency in California. Consequently, most reliable reference books list Nixon's home state as New York in the 1968 election and his home state as California in the 1972 (and 1960) election.)	Minnesota	Alabama
Running mate	Spiro Agnew	Edmund Muskie	S. Marvin Griffin
Electoral vote	6	0	0
Popular vote	409,345	335,174	60,813
Percentage	50.46%	41.32%	7.50%

Nixon
40–50%
50–60%
60–70%
Humphrey
40–50%
50–60%
60–70%
President before election
Lyndon B. Johnson
Democratic
Elected President
Richard Nixon
Republican

The 1968 United States presidential election in Colorado took place on November 5, 1968, as part of the 1968 United States presidential election. State voters chose six representatives, or electors, to the Electoral College, who voted for president and vice president.

Colorado was won by former Vice President Richard Nixon (R–New York), with 50.46% of the popular vote, against Vice President Hubert Humphrey (D–Minnesota), with 41.32% of the popular vote. American Independent Party candidate George Wallace performed quite well, finishing with 7.50% of the popular vote. This was the last election until 2020 that Colorado voted more Democratic than its neighbor, New Mexico.

Nixon's victory was the first of six consecutive Republican victories in the state, as Colorado would not vote for a Democratic candidate again until Bill Clinton in 1992. After voting Republican again for the next three elections in 1996, 2000, and 2004, it has since become a safe Democratic state.

== Results ==
1968 United States presidential election in Colorado
Party	Candidate	Votes	%
Republican	Richard Nixon	409,345	50.46%
Democratic	Hubert Humphrey	335,174	41.32%
American Independent	George Wallace	60,813	7.50%
Socialist Labor	Henning A. Blomen	3,016	0.37%
New Party	Dick Gregory	1,393	0.17%
Write-ins	—	948	0.12%
Prohibition	E. Harold Munn	275	0.03%
Socialist Workers	Fred Halstead	235	0.03%
Total votes		811,199	100%

=== By county ===
County	Richard Nixon Republican		Hubert Humphrey Democratic		George Wallace American Independent		Henning A. Blomen Socialist Labor		Various candidates Other parties		Margin		Total votes cast
County	#	%	#	%	#	%	#	%	#	%	#	%	Total votes cast
Adams	24,343	43.87%	25,111	45.25%	5,702	10.28%	270	0.49%	67	0.12%	-768	-1.38%	55,493
Alamosa	2,277	55.00%	1,574	38.02%	287	6.93%	1	0.02%	1	0.02%	703	16.98%	4,140
Arapahoe	33,712	59.65%	18,569	32.85%	3,953	6.99%	175	0.31%	110	0.19%	15,143	26.80%	56,519
Archuleta	486	49.69%	409	41.82%	83	8.49%	0	0.00%	0	0.00%	77	7.87%	978
Baca	1,441	57.55%	719	28.71%	340	13.58%	1	0.04%	3	0.12%	722	28.84%	2,504
Bent	1,228	47.47%	1,126	43.53%	231	8.93%	1	0.04%	1	0.04%	102	3.94%	2,587
Boulder	27,671	57.66%	17,422	36.30%	2,497	5.20%	125	0.26%	273	0.57%	10,249	21.36%	47,988
Chaffee	2,121	51.07%	1,667	40.14%	358	8.62%	4	0.10%	3	0.07%	454	10.93%	4,153
Cheyenne	664	55.70%	392	32.89%	136	11.41%	0	0.00%	0	0.00%	272	22.81%	1,192
Clear Creek	1,011	52.71%	719	37.49%	183	9.54%	2	0.10%	3	0.15%	292	15.22%	1,918
Conejos	1,361	45.67%	1,492	50.07%	117	3.93%	4	0.13%	6	0.20%	-131	-4.40%	2,980
Costilla	477	32.19%	933	62.96%	32	2.16%	14	0.94%	26	1.75%	-456	-30.77%	1,482
Crowley	775	50.36%	565	36.71%	196	12.74%	2	0.13%	1	0.06%	210	13.65%	1,539
Custer	433	60.47%	204	28.49%	77	10.75%	1	0.14%	1	0.14%	229	31.98%	716
Delta	3,692	55.50%	2,327	34.98%	618	9.29%	3	0.05%	12	0.18%	1,365	20.52%	6,652
Denver	92,003	43.54%	106,081	50.20%	11,408	5.40%	1,221	0.58%	604	0.28%	-14,078	-6.66%	211,317
Dolores	392	52.97%	217	29.32%	131	17.71%	0	0.00%	0	0.00%	175	23.65%	740
Douglas	1,910	61.53%	857	27.61%	327	10.53%	4	0.13%	6	0.19%	1,053	33.92%	3,104
Eagle	1,049	49.11%	927	43.40%	160	7.49%	0	0.00%	0	0.00%	122	5.71%	2,136
El Paso	32,066	53.75%	21,232	35.59%	6,199	10.39%	31	0.05%	127	0.22%	10,834	18.16%	59,655
Elbert	1,043	60.92%	484	28.27%	185	10.81%	0	0.00%	0	0.00%	559	32.65%	1,712
Fremont	4,908	53.45%	3,292	35.85%	967	10.53%	5	0.05%	11	0.12%	1,616	17.60%	9,183
Garfield	3,157	52.24%	2,273	37.61%	607	10.04%	1	0.02%	5	0.08%	884	14.63%	6,043
Gilpin	358	52.57%	218	32.01%	99	14.54%	1	0.15%	5	0.73%	140	20.56%	681
Grand	1,167	67.38%	433	25.00%	127	7.33%	1	0.06%	4	0.24%	734	42.38%	1,732
Gunnison	1,411	58.19%	866	35.71%	139	5.73%	7	0.29%	2	0.08%	545	22.48%	2,425
Hinsdale	127	66.15%	43	22.40%	22	11.45%	0	0.00%	0	0.00%	84	43.75%	192
Huerfano	1,133	35.14%	1,934	59.99%	150	4.65%	5	0.16%	2	0.06%	-801	-24.85%	3,224
Jackson	474	67.52%	177	25.21%	51	7.27%	0	0.00%	0	0.00%	297	42.31%	702
Jefferson	50,847	56.90%	31,392	35.13%	6,767	7.57%	192	0.21%	159	0.18%	19,455	21.77%	89,357
Kiowa	689	56.29%	423	34.56%	112	9.15%	0	0.00%	0	0.00%	266	21.73%	1,224
Kit Carson	1,977	61.08%	1,026	31.70%	232	7.17%	1	0.03%	1	0.03%	951	29.38%	3,237
La Plata	4,269	57.10%	2,523	33.75%	673	9.00%	1	0.01%	10	0.13%	1,746	23.35%	7,476
Lake	1,025	35.50%	1,550	53.69%	287	9.94%	21	0.73%	4	0.13%	-525	-18.19%	2,887
Larimer	18,438	62.13%	9,152	30.84%	1,819	6.13%	156	0.53%	111	0.37%	9,286	31.29%	29,676
Las Animas	2,499	33.30%	4,602	61.33%	388	5.17%	4	0.05%	11	0.15%	-2,103	-28.03%	7,504
Lincoln	1,407	57.08%	809	32.82%	247	10.02%	1	0.04%	1	0.04%	598	24.26%	2,465
Logan	4,323	56.95%	2,521	33.21%	736	9.70%	8	0.11%	3	0.04%	1,802	23.74%	7,591
Mesa	10,745	49.58%	8,775	40.49%	2,076	9.58%	17	0.08%	58	0.26%	1,970	9.09%	21,671
Mineral	116	43.77%	126	47.55%	22	8.30%	1	0.38%	0	0.00%	-10	-3.78%	265
Moffat	1,785	62.09%	765	26.61%	322	11.20%	2	0.07%	1	0.03%	1,020	35.48%	2,875
Montezuma	2,461	56.42%	1,349	30.93%	545	12.49%	1	0.02%	6	0.13%	1,112	25.49%	4,362
Montrose	3,547	52.85%	2,394	35.67%	753	11.22%	7	0.10%	11	0.16%	1,153	17.18%	6,712
Morgan	4,598	61.21%	2,310	30.75%	593	7.89%	6	0.08%	5	0.07%	2,288	30.46%	7,512
Otero	4,690	49.66%	3,891	41.20%	723	7.65%	104	1.10%	37	0.39%	799	8.46%	9,445
Ouray	401	52.01%	250	32.43%	120	15.56%	0	0.00%	0	0.00%	151	19.58%	771
Park	601	58.58%	286	27.88%	134	13.06%	3	0.29%	2	0.20%	315	30.70%	1,026
Phillips	1,237	56.87%	723	33.24%	211	9.70%	2	0.09%	2	0.09%	514	23.63%	2,175
Pitkin	1,135	56.16%	728	36.02%	136	6.73%	22	1.09%	0	0.00%	598	20.14%	2,021
Prowers	2,741	49.07%	2,329	41.69%	503	9.00%	2	0.04%	11	0.20%	412	7.38%	5,586
Pueblo	16,646	34.47%	27,215	56.36%	3,823	7.92%	525	1.09%	82	0.18%	-10,569	-21.89%	48,291
Rio Blanco	1,294	64.60%	502	25.06%	204	10.18%	2	0.10%	1	0.05%	792	39.54%	2,003
Rio Grande	2,442	58.32%	1,562	37.31%	182	4.35%	1	0.02%	0	0.00%	880	21.01%	4,187
Routt	1,602	53.83%	1,076	36.16%	292	9.81%	2	0.07%	4	0.13%	526	17.67%	2,976
Saguache	824	52.45%	648	41.25%	97	6.17%	1	0.06%	1	0.06%	176	11.20%	1,571
San Juan	165	46.09%	134	37.43%	59	16.48%	0	0.00%	0	0.00%	31	8.66%	358
San Miguel	422	53.22%	311	39.22%	60	7.56%	0	0.00%	0	0.00%	111	14.00%	793
Sedgwick	1,007	60.92%	546	33.03%	100	6.05%	0	0.00%	0	0.00%	461	27.89%	1,653
Summit	536	57.39%	301	32.23%	95	10.17%	1	0.11%	1	0.11%	235	25.16%	934
Teller	722	52.39%	403	29.25%	249	18.07%	4	0.29%	0	0.00%	319	23.14%	1,378
Washington	1,634	60.92%	694	25.88%	352	13.12%	1	0.04%	1	0.04%	940	35.04%	2,682
Weld	17,101	57.26%	10,420	34.89%	2,189	7.33%	101	0.34%	54	0.19%	6,681	22.37%	29,865
Yuma	2,529	62.68%	1,175	29.12%	330	8.18%	1	0.02%	0	0.00%	1,354	33.56%	4,035
Total	409,345	50.46%	335,174	41.32%	60,813	7.50%	3,016	0.37%	2,851	0.35%	74,171	9.14%	811,199

==== Counties that flipped from Democratic to Republican ====
- Grand
- Rio Blanco
- Jackson
- Moffat
- Douglas
- Yuma
- Montezuma
- Boulder
- Weld
- Sedgwick
- Larimer
- Routt
- Garfield
- Eagle
- Summit
- Jefferson
- Clear Creek
- Gilpin
- Arapahoe
- Chaffee
- Gunnison
- Pitkin
- Dolores
- Ouray
- La Plata
- San Juan
- Rio Grande
- Archuleta
- Huerfano
- Alamosa
- Saguache
- Bent
- Otero
- Baca
- San Miguel
- Cheyenne
- Mesa
- Delta
- Montrose
- Park
- Fremont
- Custer
- El Paso
- Teller
- Morgan
- Logan
- Crowley
- Phillips
- Lincoln
- Prowers
- Kit Carson
- Kiowa

=== Results by congressional district ===
Nixon won 3 of 4 congressional districts while Humphrey won a single district.

District	Nixon	Humphrey	Wallace
1st	43.9%	50.6%	6.7%
2nd	51.1%	37.3%	7.7%
3rd	47.5%	43.3%	9.2%
4th	56.3%	35.4%	8.3%
