= 2008 United States presidential election in Colorado =

- November 4, 2008

Nominee	Barack Obama	John McCain
Party	Democratic	Republican
Home state	Illinois	Arizona
Running mate	Joe Biden	Sarah Palin
Electoral vote	9	0
Popular vote	1,288,633	1,073,629
Percentage	53.66%	44.71%

Obama
40–50%
50–60%
60–70%
70–80%
80–90%
90–100%
McCain
40–50%
50–60%
60–70%
70–80%
80–90%
90–100%
Tie/No Data
President before election
George W. Bush
Republican
Elected President
Barack Obama
Democratic

The 2008 United States presidential election in Colorado took place on November 4, 2008, as a part of the 2008 United States presidential election throughout all 50 states and the District of Columbia. Voters chose nine representatives, or electors to the Electoral College, who voted for president and vice president.

Colorado was won by Democratic nominee Barack Obama by a margin of victory of 8.95%. Obama took 53.66% of the vote to McCain's 44.71%. The state was heavily targeted by both campaigns, although, prior to the election, all 17 news organizations actually considered this a state Obama would win, or otherwise considered as a safe blue state. While George W. Bush narrowly carried the state in 2004, Colorado ultimately flipped to Obama. This was the first time since 1992 in which the state was won by a Democrat in a presidential election, as well as the first of currently five consecutive times since 1944 in which it voted differently than Montana, another Rocky Mountain state.

Key to Obama's victory was Democratic dominance in the Denver area, sweeping not just the city but also the heavily populated suburban counties around Denver, particularly Adams, Arapahoe, and Jefferson counties, as well as winning Larimer County, home to Fort Collins. Obama also took over 70% of the vote in Boulder County, home to Boulder. McCain's most populated county wins were in El Paso County, where Colorado Springs is located, and Weld County, home to Greeley.

Colorado served as the tipping-point state for Obama's overall victory in the presidential election - that is, the first state to give a candidate their 270th electoral vote when all states are arranged by their margins of victory.

== Caucuses ==
- 2008 Colorado Democratic caucuses
- 2008 Colorado Republican caucuses

== Campaign ==
=== Predictions ===
There were 16 news organizations who made state-by-state predictions of the election. Here are their last predictions before election day:

Source	Ranking
D.C. Political Report	Likely D (flip)
Cook Political Report	Lean D (flip)
The Takeaway	Lean D (flip)
Electoral-vote.com	Lean D (flip)
Washington Post	Lean D (flip)
Politico	Lean D (flip)
RealClearPolitics	Lean D (flip)
FiveThirtyEight	Solid D (flip)
CQ Politics	Lean D (flip)
The New York Times	Lean D (flip)
CNN	Lean D (flip)
NPR	Lean D (flip)
MSNBC	Lean D (flip)
Fox News	Likely D (flip)
Associated Press	Likely D (flip)
Rasmussen Reports	Lean D (flip)

=== Polling ===
Pre-election polling taken in Colorado prior to the election mostly showed Obama with a slight lead. He led every poll after September 25. The average of the last three polls showed Obama leading McCain 52% to 45%.

=== Fundraising ===
John McCain raised a total of $3,491,086. Barack Obama raised almost $11 million.

=== Advertising and visits ===
Obama and his interest groups spent $10,410,669. McCain and his interest groups spent $9,818,077. McCain/Palin visited the state 13 times. Obama/Biden visited the state 8 times.

== Analysis ==
Changing demographics and a growing Hispanic population made the state more favorable to the Democrats, although Republicans still had a hold on the state due to the party's conservative stances on social issues like abortion, gay rights, and gun control. Like most of the Mountain West, Colorado had been traditionally Republican beginning with the Eisenhower landslide of 1952, in which Eisenhower overperformed throughout the region. Between 1952 and 2004, inclusive, Democrats prevailed in Colorado only in 1964 and 1992—the former, a national Democratic landslide; the latter, a three-way contest in which independent candidate Ross Perot had disproportionate strength in the West. In addition, Republicans had mostly held control of the state legislature and most statewide offices since the 1960s. Although Democrats had bases of support in Adams and Pueblo Counties and in the south of the state, and generally carried Denver (albeit often by narrow margins), this was generally no match for Republican dominance of the Denver suburbs, El Paso County (Colorado Springs), Larimer County (Fort Collins), and, until Dukakis flipped it in 1988, Boulder County, as well as of most of the rural areas of the state.

Recently, however, there had been a growing population of Hispanic Americans, young professionals, and an influx of people from other states - all of whom tend to vote Democratic. These demographic changes caused the state's political ideology to shift. While Republicans still enjoyed an advantage in voter registration statewide, Democrats had been closing the gap. There had also been an increasing number of unaffiliated, independent-minded voters. Since 2004, Democrats had won the governorship, both Senate seats, three House seats, and control of both chambers in the state legislature.

At the presidential level, Colorado voted for Bush by 8.36% in 2000, making it the second-closest of the states carried by Dole in 1996 (behind only Virginia). Moreover, his 50.75% vote share was his lowest in any of the states carried by Dole in 1996, with Ralph Nader posting a relatively strong showing in the state in 2000. Colorado was not seriously contested in 2004, but Kerry cut Bush's margin down to 4.67% in the state, as Kerry flipped a number of ski-resort counties, scored the best showings in Denver and Boulder County of any presidential nominee in decades, and narrowed Bush's margins in the Denver-area suburban counties of Jefferson and Arapahoe, as well as in Larimer.

Bush's relatively narrow margin in the state in 2004, along with the demographic changes of the prior four years, led Colorado to become a crucial swing state in 2008. Both Barack Obama and John McCain campaigned extensively in the state. Several factors in the campaign favored the Democrat. Barack Obama did very well in the caucus, defeating opponent Hillary Clinton with almost 67% of the vote. On the other hand, John McCain badly lost the state to opponent Mitt Romney, who gained 60% of the vote. Moreover, the 2008 Democratic National Convention was held in Denver. The publicity generated from the event provided a strong boost to Obama. According to Real Clear Politics polling averages, Obama and McCain were neck-to-neck through the summer and early September. However, as the 2008 financial crisis hit, Obama's numbers in Colorado jumped to over 50%.

During the campaign, several media organizations reported on voting machine problems. There was also reporting on the controversial practice of "purging" voter registration lists.

On election day, Obama won by a comfortable margin, greater than his national average. Obama improved on John Kerry's performance throughout the state. He won landslides in the Democratic strongholds of Denver and Boulder; in both areas, Obama took more than 70% of the vote. He also further built upon Kerry's strength in a number of rich counties dominated by ski resorts along the Front Range; and continued to dominate the traditionally Democratic areas of Pueblo County, Adams County, and the thinly populated, Latino counties of southern Colorado.

McCain did best in the rural, conservative areas next to Kansas and Utah, where he won by landslide margins. In Rio Blanco County, Mesa County, Yuma County, Washington County, Lincoln County, Bent County, Crowley County, and tiny Dolores County, Phillips County, Cheyenne County, and Kiowa County, he managed a slightly greater vote share than Bush in 2000. Voters in more populated El Paso County, home to conservative Colorado Springs, gave McCain a 19% margin, which, while a comfortable win, was far less than Bush's 35% margin in 2004. McCain also won two other relatively populated counties, Douglas County and Weld County, both outer suburbs of the Denver area—although, again, by substantially reduced margins compared to Bush in 2004. However, the largest suburban counties of the area, traditionally Republican Jefferson, Larimer, and Arapahoe Counties voted Democratic for the first time since 1964. Broomfield County, which cast its first presidential vote for Bush in 2004, also flipped to Obama. Altogether, this was more than enough to overcome Republican advantages elsewhere in the state, as Obama won it by a nearly nine-point margin.

Elsewhere in the state, Democrats also did well. Democrat Mark Udall defeated Republican Bob Schaffer for an open U.S. Senate seat; his vacated House seat was also won by Democrat Jared Polis. In addition, Democrat Betsy Markey defeated incumbent Republican Marilyn Musgrave, by 12 points for Colorado's 4th Congressional District seat. At the state level, Democrats picked up one seat in the Colorado Senate, but lost two seats in the Colorado House of Representatives.

Obama's 65.8% victory in Summit County was the highest percentage win by a Democratic presidential nominee in the county since Woodrow Wilson won the county with 70.3% of the vote back in 1916.

== Results ==
2008 United States presidential election in Colorado
Party	Candidate	Running mate	Votes	Percentage	Electoral votes
Democratic	Barack Obama	Joe Biden	1,288,633	53.66%	9
Republican	John McCain	Sarah Palin	1,073,629	44.71%	0
Independent	Ralph Nader	Matt Gonzalez	13,352	0.56%	0
Libertarian	Bob Barr	Wayne Allyn Root	10,898	0.45%	0
Constitution	Chuck Baldwin	Darrell Castle	6,233	0.26%	0
America's Independent	Alan Keyes	Brian Rohrbough	3,051	0.13%	0
Green	Cynthia McKinney	Rosa Clemente	2,822	0.12%	0
New American Independent	Frank McEnulty	David Mangan	829	0.03%	0
Boston Tea	Charles Jay	Dan Sallis Jr.	598	0.02%	0
HeartQuake '08	Jonathan Allen	Jeffrey Stath	348	0.01%	0
Objectivist	Tom Stevens	Alden Link	336	0.01%	0
Socialist	Brian Moore	Stewart Alexander	226	0.01%	0
Socialism and Liberation	Gloria La Riva	Eugene Puryear	158	0.01%	0
Socialist Workers	James Harris	Alyson Kennedy	154	0.01%	0
Pacifist	Bradford Lyttle	Abraham Bassford	110	<0.01%	0
Prohibition	Gene Amondson	Leroy Pletten	85	<0.01%	0
Totals			2,401,462	100.00%	9
Voter turnout					65.0%

=== By county ===
County	Barack Obama Democratic		John McCain Republican		Various candidates Other parties		Margin		Total votes cast
County	#	%	#	%	#	%	#	%	Total votes cast
Adams	93,445	58.22%	63,976	39.86%	3,080	1.92%	29,469	18.36%	160,501
Alamosa	3,521	56.01%	2,635	41.92%	130	2.07%	886	14.09%	6,286
Arapahoe	148,224	55.69%	113,868	42.78%	4,064	1.53%	34,356	12.91%	266,156
Archuleta	2,836	42.81%	3,638	54.91%	151	2.28%	-802	-12.10%	6,625
Baca	536	24.64%	1,572	72.28%	67	3.08%	-1,036	-47.64%	2,175
Bent	799	41.61%	1,077	56.09%	44	2.29%	-278	-14.48%	1,920
Boulder	124,159	72.29%	44,904	26.14%	2,700	1.57%	79,255	46.15%	171,763
Broomfield	16,168	54.89%	12,757	43.31%	528	1.79%	3,411	11.58%	29,453
Chaffee	4,862	49.01%	4,873	49.12%	186	2.28%	-11	-0.11%	9,921
Cheyenne	198	17.82%	890	80.11%	23	2.07%	-692	-62.29%	1,111
Clear Creek	3,332	57.78%	2,300	39.88%	135	2.34%	1,032	17.90%	5,767
Conejos	2,154	55.60%	1,653	42.67%	67	1.73%	501	12.93%	3,874
Costilla	1,245	73.36%	415	24.45%	37	2.28%	830	48.91%	1,697
Crowley	552	35.43%	976	62.64%	30	1.93%	-424	-27.21%	1,558
Custer	912	34.69%	1,672	63.60%	45	1.71%	-760	-28.91%	2,629
Delta	5,084	32.94%	10,067	65.23%	283	1.83%	-4,983	-32.29%	15,434
Denver	204,882	75.45%	62,567	23.04%	4,084	1.50%	142,315	52.41%	271,533
Dolores	369	30.32%	818	67.21%	30	2.47%	-449	-36.89%	1,217
Douglas	61,960	40.81%	88,108	58.03%	1,751	1.15%	-26,148	-17.22%	151,819
Eagle	13,191	60.91%	8,181	37.77%	286	1.32%	5,010	23.14%	21,658
El Paso	108,899	39.86%	160,318	58.69%	3,958	1.45%	-51,419	-18.83%	273,175
Elbert	3,819	28.92%	9,108	68.97%	279	2.11%	-5,289	-40.05%	13,206
Fremont	6,844	34.36%	12,668	63.60%	407	2.04%	-5,824	-29.24%	19,919
Garfield	11,357	49.20%	11,359	49.21%	366	1.59%	-2	-0.01%	23,082
Gilpin	1,990	59.07%	1,283	38.08%	96	2.85%	707	20.99%	3,369
Grand	4,037	48.59%	4,128	49.68%	144	1.73%	-91	-1.09%	8,309
Gunnison	5,557	62.64%	3,131	35.29%	183	2.06%	2,426	27.35%	8,871
Hinsdale	240	40.07%	344	57.43%	15	2.50%	-104	-17.36%	599
Huerfano	1,989	54.60%	1,580	43.37%	74	2.03%	409	11.23%	3,643
Jackson	277	30.31%	624	68.27%	13	1.42%	-347	-37.96%	914
Jefferson	158,158	53.60%	131,628	44.61%	5,282	1.79%	26,530	8.99%	295,068
Kiowa	178	20.89%	650	76.29%	24	2.82%	-472	-55.40%	852
Kit Carson	912	26.50%	2,455	71.32%	75	2.18%	-1,543	-44.82%	3,442
La Plata	16,057	57.39%	11,503	41.11%	419	1.50%	4,554	16.28%	27,979
Lake	1,859	61.93%	1,078	35.91%	65	2.17%	781	26.02%	3,002
Larimer	89,823	53.99%	73,642	44.26%	2,910	1.75%	16,181	9.73%	166,375
Las Animas	3,562	52.68%	3,086	45.64%	113	1.67%	476	7.04%	6,761
Lincoln	546	23.70%	1,717	74.52%	41	1.78%	-1,171	-50.82%	2,304
Logan	2,846	31.70%	6,002	66.86%	129	1.44%	-3,156	-35.16%	8,977
Mesa	24,008	34.48%	44,578	64.02%	1,045	1.50%	-20,570	-29.54%	69,631
Mineral	270	43.34%	334	53.61%	19	3.05%	-64	-10.27%	623
Moffat	1,582	26.95%	4,135	70.43%	154	2.62%	-2,553	-43.48%	5,871
Montezuma	4,661	39.42%	6,961	58.87%	203	1.72%	-2,300	-19.45%	11,825
Montrose	6,495	33.91%	12,199	63.69%	459	2.40%	-5,704	-29.78%	19,153
Morgan	3,813	37.26%	6,272	61.29%	149	1.46%	-2,459	-24.03%	10,234
Otero	3,547	43.98%	4,393	54.47%	125	1.55%	-846	-10.49%	8,065
Ouray	1,636	53.46%	1,367	44.67%	57	1.86%	269	8.79%	3,060
Park	4,250	45.29%	4,896	52.18%	237	2.53%	-646	-6.89%	9,383
Phillips	622	27.51%	1,613	71.34%	26	1.15%	-991	-43.83%	2,261
Pitkin	7,349	73.74%	2,484	24.92%	133	1.33%	4,865	48.82%	9,966
Prowers	1,487	32.22%	3,043	65.94%	85	1.84%	-1,556	-33.72%	4,615
Pueblo	41,097	56.74%	30,257	41.78%	1,073	1.48%	10,840	14.96%	72,427
Rio Blanco	655	20.81%	2,437	77.44%	55	1.75%	-1,782	-56.63%	3,147
Rio Grande	2,448	44.97%	2,930	53.82%	66	1.21%	-482	-8.85%	5,444
Routt	8,270	62.66%	4,725	35.80%	204	1.55%	3,545	26.86%	13,199
Saguache	1,730	62.91%	956	34.76%	64	2.33%	774	28.15%	2,750
San Juan	264	53.23%	218	43.95%	14	1.92%	46	9.28%	496
San Miguel	3,349	76.99%	933	21.45%	68	1.56%	2,416	55.54%	4,350
Sedgwick	468	34.64%	857	63.43%	26	1.92%	-389	-28.79%	1,351
Summit	9,802	65.79%	4,883	32.77%	214	1.44%	4,919	33.02%	14,899
Teller	4,513	34.97%	8,146	63.12%	247	1.91%	-3,633	-28.15%	12,906
Washington	529	21.05%	1,949	77.56%	35	1.39%	-1,420	-56.51%	2,513
Weld	47,292	44.67%	56,526	53.39%	2,048	1.93%	-9,234	-8.72%	105,866
Yuma	1,117	24.92%	3,286	73.30%	80	1.78%	-2,169	-48.38%	4,483
Total	1,288,633	53.66%	1,073,629	44.71%	39,200	1.63%	215,004	8.95%	2,401,462

Counties that flipped from Republican to Democratic

- Alamosa (largest city: Alamosa)
- Arapahoe (largest city: Aurora)
- Broomfield
- Huerfano (largest city: Walsenburg)
- Jefferson (largest city: Lakewood)
- Larimer (largest city: Fort Collins)
- Ouray (largest city: Ouray)

=== By congressional district ===
While Barack Obama won the state's popular vote and nine electoral votes, John McCain carried four of the state's seven congressional districts, including two seats held by Democrats.

District	McCain	Obama	Representative
1st	24.25%	74.20%	Diana DeGette
2nd	34.10%	64.22%	Mark Udall (110th Congress)
2nd	34.10%	64.22%	Jared Polis (111th Congress)
3rd	50.44%	47.90%	John Salazar
4th	49.54%	48.66%	Marilyn Musgrave (110th Congress)
4th	49.54%	48.66%	Betsy Markey (111th Congress)
5th	58.57%	39.89%	Doug Lamborn
6th	52.48%	46.17%	Tom Tancredo (110th Congress)
6th	52.48%	46.17%	Mike Coffman (111th Congress)
7th	39.49%	58.56%	Ed Perlmutter

== Electors ==
Technically the voters of Colorado cast their ballots for electors: representatives to the Electoral College. Colorado is allocated 9 electors because it has 7 congressional districts and 2 senators. All candidates who appear on the ballot or qualify to receive write-in votes must submit a list of 9 electors, who pledge to vote for their candidate and their running mate. Whoever wins the majority of votes in the state is awarded all 9 electoral votes. Their chosen electors then vote for president and vice president. Although electors are pledged to their candidate and running mate, they are not obligated to vote for them. An elector who votes for someone other than their candidate is known as a faithless elector.

The electors of each state and the District of Columbia met on December 15, 2008, to cast their votes for president and vice president. The Electoral College itself never meets as one body. Instead the electors from each state and the District of Columbia met in their respective capitols.

The following were the members of the Electoral College from the state. All 9 were pledged to Obama and Biden:

1. Wellington Webb
2. Terry Phillips
3. Camilla Auger
4. Pam Shaddock
5. Jennifer Trujillo-Sanchez
6. Don Strickland
7. Ann Knollman
8. Polly Baca
9. Margaret Atencio
