= 2004 United States presidential election in Colorado =

- November 2, 2004
- Turnout: 88.6% (of registered voters); 62.7% (of voting age population)

| Nominee | George W. Bush | John Kerry |
| Party | Republican | Democratic |
| Home state | Texas | Massachusetts |
| Running mate | Dick Cheney | John Edwards |
| Electoral vote | 9 | 0 |
| Popular vote | 1,101,255 | 1,001,732 |
| Percentage | 51.69% | 47.02% |

Bush
50–60%
60–70%
70–80%
80–90%
Kerry
40–50%
50–60%
60–70%
70–80%
President before election
George W. Bush
Republican
Elected President
George W. Bush
Republican

The 2004 United States presidential election in Colorado took place on November 2, 2004, and was part of the 2004 United States presidential election. Voters chose nine representatives, or electors to the Electoral College, who voted for president and vice president.

Colorado was won by incumbent President George W. Bush by a 4.67% margin of victory. Prior to the election, ten of twelve news organizations considered this a state Bush would win, or otherwise considered as a red state, although both campaigns targeted it as the Democratic candidate, John Kerry, was born in Colorado. On election day, Bush did carry Colorado, but by only about half the 8.4% margin he won over Al Gore in 2000.

As of the 2024, this is the last time that Pueblo County voted for the losing candidate and that the Republican nominee carried Colorado in a presidential election, as well as Arapahoe, Jefferson, Larimer, and Ouray counties. This is also the only presidential election that Broomfield County, created in 2001, has voted Republican. It was also the first time any candidate received a million votes in the state. It was also the last time Colorado voted to the right of the nation as a whole in a presidential election. Bush became the first Republican to win the White House without carrying Clear Creek, Eagle, Gunnison, or Routt Counties since William Howard Taft in 1908, as well as the first to do so without carrying La Plata County since Calvin Coolidge in 1924, and the first to do so without carrying San Juan County since Herbert Hoover in 1928. It also marked the only time since 1972 that the Democratic nominee lost their birth state. This was also the first presidential election in Colorado with the newly formed county Broomfield.

Colorado was 1 of 9 states to back George W. Bush twice that only backed George H. W. Bush once, and 1 of 2 states to back George W. Bush twice but have not been won by a Republican since, the other being Virginia.

== Primaries ==
- 2004 Colorado Democratic presidential caucuses

== Campaign ==
=== Predictions ===
There were 12 news organizations who made state-by-state predictions of the election. Here are their last predictions before election day.

| Source | Ranking |
|---|---|
| D.C. Political Report | Lean R |
| Associated Press | Lean R |
| CNN | Likely R |
| Cook Political Report | Lean R |
| Newsweek | Lean R |
| New York Times | Lean R |
| Rasmussen Reports | Likely R |
| Research 2000 | Lean R |
| Washington Post | Toss-up |
| Washington Times | Lean R |
| Zogby International | Likely D (flip) |
| Washington Dispatch | Likely R |

=== Polling ===
Although considered a battleground state, Bush won almost every pre-election poll. The final three polls averaged Bush leading with 51% to 44%.

=== Fundraising ===
Bush raised $2,598,226. Kerry raised $3,229,631.

=== Advertising and visits ===
In the fall election campaign, the Republican ticket visited Colorado 5 times. The Democratic ticket visited 7 times. Bush and Kerry also heavily advertised each week. Bush spent just over $400,000 each week. Kerry spent over $500,000 each week.

== Analysis ==
The key to Bush's victory in the state was winning most of the largely populated counties, such as Jefferson County, Douglas County, El Paso County, Arapahoe County, and Larimer County. Combined with his strength in rural Colorado, this offset Kerry's strength in Denver and Boulder County and in several smaller counties hosting ski resorts, such as Gunnison (Crested Butte), Eagle (Vail), Routt (Steamboat Springs), and La Plata (Purgatory Resort).

Nevertheless, Bush's margin in Colorado was reduced substantially with respect to 2000, even as nationally he improved from losing the popular vote by 0.5% to winning it by 2.5%. Kerry flipped seven counties—Gunnison, Eagle, Routt, La Plata, Clear Creek, Conejos, and San Juan, the last of which voted Democratic for the first time since Lyndon Johnson's 1964 landslide. (Note: San Juan County actually gave a plurality to Independent Ross Perot in 1992, but gave a Republican plurality in every other presidential election between 1968 and 2000.) Most critically, however, Bush's vote share in the city of Denver dipped from 30.9% to 29.3%--a lower vote share than Dole had received in the city in 1996—and his margin of defeat in Denver swelled from 31.0% to 40.3%, as Kerry won the highest vote share in the city of any nominee in over a century. Similarly, in Boulder County, the other large Democratic jurisdiction in the state at the time, Bush's vote share dipped from 36.4% to 32.4%--again, below Dole's in 1996. Kerry expanded Gore's 13.7% margin to 33.9%, as he posted the best showing in the county of any nominee since Eisenhower in 1956. Meanwhile, Bush's margin shrank markedly in Jefferson, Arapahoe, and Larimer counties. Bush's vote share actually receded slightly in Arapahoe and Larimer. All of these trends continued into 2008 and beyond, contributing to making Colorado into a relatively Democratic state by 2020. Despite what at the time was a historically low vote share in Denver, Bush remains, as of 2024, the last Republican to have cracked even a quarter of the vote in Denver.

At the same time, Bush also had areas of improvement in Colorado. He increased his margin in then-staunchly Republican El Paso County by 1.5%, and cut Kerry's margin in Pueblo County, historically the largest Democratic stronghold in the state, from 11.3% to 6.3%, posting the best showing for a Republican in the county since 1984. He also flipped Huerfano County, becoming the first Republican to carry it since Nixon's 1972 landslide; his win there reflected what was, for a Republican, his strong appeal amongst Hispanic voters, which also helped him narrowly carry New Mexico and boosted his margin in his home state of Texas.

Bush carried Colorado despite it being Kerry's birth state. Ironically, Bush simultaneously lost his own birth state of Connecticut, making this the only election since 1864 where neither candidate carried their birth state.

Additionally, there was a constitutional amendment put on the ballot in the state to alter the way the state's electors would be distributed among presidential candidates, but it was rejected by the voters in 2004.

== Results ==
2004 United States presidential election in Colorado
| Party | Candidate | Votes | Percentage | Electoral votes |
|---|---|---|---|---|
| Republican | George W. Bush (incumbent) | 1,101,255 | 51.69% | 9 |
| Democratic | John Kerry | 1,001,732 | 47.02% | 0 |
| Reform | Ralph Nader | 12,718 | 0.60% | 0 |
| Libertarian | Michael Badnarik | 7,664 | 0.36% | 0 |
| Constitution | Michael Peroutka | 2,562 | 0.12% | 0 |
| Green | David Cobb | 1,591 | 0.07% | 0 |
| Independent | Stanford Andress | 804 | 0.04% | 0 |
| Independent | Write-Ins | 700 | 0.03% | 0 |
| Concerns of People | Gene Amondson | 378 | 0.02% | 0 |
| Socialist Equality | Bill Van Auken | 329 | 0.02% | 0 |
| Socialist Workers | Roger Calero | 241 | 0.01% | 0 |
| Socialist | Walt Brown | 216 | 0.01% | 0 |
| Prohibition | Earl Dodge | 140 | 0.01% | 0 |
| Totals | | 2,130,330 | 100.00% | 9 |
| Voter turnout (Voting Age) | | | | 62.7% |

=== By county ===
| County | George W. Bush Republican | | John Kerry Democratic | | Various candidates Other parties | | Margin | | Total votes cast |
| County | # | % | # | % | # | % | # | % | Total votes cast |
|---|---|---|---|---|---|---|---|---|---|
| Adams | 65,912 | 48.22% | 69,122 | 50.57% | 1,643 | 1.20% | -3,210 | -2.35% | 136,677 |
| Alamosa | 3,179 | 50.63% | 3,017 | 48.05% | 83 | 1.32% | 162 | 2.58% | 6,279 |
| Arapahoe | 119,475 | 51.42% | 110,262 | 47.45% | 2,628 | 1.13% | 9,213 | 3.97% | 232,365 |
| Archuleta | 3,601 | 61.67% | 2,141 | 36.67% | 97 | 1.66% | 1,460 | 25.00% | 5,839 |
| Baca | 1,680 | 76.85% | 483 | 22.10% | 23 | 1.05% | 1,197 | 54.75% | 2,186 |
| Bent | 1,338 | 62.09% | 785 | 36.43% | 32 | 1.48% | 553 | 25.66% | 2,155 |
| Boulder | 51,586 | 32.39% | 105,564 | 66.28% | 2,109 | 1.33% | -53,978 | -33.89% | 159,259 |
| Broomfield | 12,007 | 51.68% | 10,935 | 47.06% | 293 | 1.26% | 1,072 | 4.62% | 23,235 |
| Chaffee | 4,875 | 55.59% | 3,766 | 42.94% | 129 | 1.47% | 1,109 | 12.65% | 8,770 |
| Cheyenne | 923 | 81.39% | 198 | 17.46% | 13 | 1.14% | 725 | 63.93% | 1,134 |
| Clear Creek | 2,522 | 44.93% | 2,989 | 53.25% | 102 | 1.81% | -467 | -8.32% | 5,613 |
| Conejos | 1,864 | 49.01% | 1,894 | 49.80% | 45 | 1.18% | -30 | -0.79% | 3,803 |
| Costilla | 566 | 32.16% | 1,170 | 66.48% | 24 | 1.36% | -604 | -34.32% | 1,760 |
| Crowley | 1,006 | 67.38% | 478 | 32.02% | 9 | 0.60% | 528 | 35.36% | 1,493 |
| Custer | 1,657 | 68.25% | 739 | 30.44% | 32 | 1.32% | 918 | 37.81% | 2,428 |
| Delta | 9,722 | 68.66% | 4,224 | 29.83% | 213 | 1.51% | 5,498 | 38.83% | 14,159 |
| Denver | 69,903 | 29.27% | 166,135 | 69.56% | 2,788 | 1.17% | -96,232 | -40.29% | 238,826 |
| Dolores | 785 | 68.44% | 333 | 29.03% | 29 | 2.53% | 452 | 39.41% | 1,147 |
| Douglas | 80,651 | 66.54% | 39,661 | 32.72% | 889 | 0.73% | 40,990 | 33.82% | 121,201 |
| Eagle | 8,533 | 46.10% | 9,744 | 52.64% | 234 | 1.26% | -1,211 | -6.54% | 18,511 |
| El Paso | 161,361 | 66.74% | 77,648 | 32.11% | 2,779 | 1.15% | 83,713 | 34.63% | 241,788 |
| Elbert | 8,389 | 73.82% | 2,834 | 24.94% | 141 | 1.24% | 5,555 | 48.88% | 11,364 |
| Fremont | 12,313 | 66.46% | 5,933 | 32.03% | 280 | 1.51% | 6,380 | 34.43% | 18,526 |
| Garfield | 11,123 | 53.87% | 9,228 | 44.69% | 296 | 1.44% | 1,895 | 9.18% | 20,647 |
| Gilpin | 1,329 | 41.58% | 1,807 | 56.54% | 60 | 1.88% | -478 | -14.96% | 3,196 |
| Grand | 4,260 | 55.99% | 3,243 | 42.62% | 106 | 1.40% | 1,017 | 13.37% | 7,609 |
| Gunnison | 3,479 | 41.32% | 4,782 | 56.79% | 159 | 1.88% | -1,303 | -15.47% | 8,420 |
| Hinsdale | 355 | 58.97% | 236 | 39.20% | 11 | 1.83% | 119 | 19.77% | 602 |
| Huerfano | 1,701 | 50.09% | 1,656 | 48.76% | 39 | 1.15% | 45 | 1.33% | 3,396 |
| Jackson | 710 | 76.02% | 210 | 22.48% | 14 | 1.50% | 500 | 53.54% | 934 |
| Jefferson | 140,644 | 51.79% | 126,558 | 46.60% | 4,366 | 1.61% | 14,086 | 5.19% | 271,568 |
| Kiowa | 712 | 79.82% | 172 | 19.28% | 8 | 0.90% | 540 | 60.54% | 892 |
| Kit Carson | 2,721 | 77.70% | 729 | 20.82% | 52 | 1.50% | 1,992 | 56.88% | 3,502 |
| La Plata | 11,704 | 45.87% | 13,409 | 52.56% | 400 | 1.57% | -1,705 | -6.69% | 25,513 |
| Lake | 1,261 | 42.76% | 1,623 | 55.04% | 65 | 2.21% | -362 | -12.28% | 2,949 |
| Larimer | 75,884 | 51.82% | 68,266 | 46.62% | 2,286 | 1.56% | 7,618 | 5.20% | 146,436 |
| Las Animas | 3,196 | 48.48% | 3,300 | 50.06% | 96 | 1.46% | -104 | -1.58% | 6,592 |
| Lincoln | 1,819 | 77.83% | 503 | 21.52% | 15 | 0.64% | 1,316 | 56.31% | 2,337 |
| Logan | 6,168 | 70.36% | 2,491 | 28.42% | 107 | 1.22% | 3,677 | 41.94% | 8,766 |
| Mesa | 41,539 | 67.12% | 19,564 | 31.61% | 782 | 1.27% | 21,975 | 35.51% | 61,885 |
| Mineral | 383 | 61.87% | 227 | 36.67% | 9 | 1.45% | 156 | 25.20% | 619 |
| Moffat | 4,247 | 74.18% | 1,355 | 23.67% | 123 | 2.15% | 2,892 | 50.51% | 5,725 |
| Montezuma | 6,988 | 63.44% | 3,867 | 35.11% | 160 | 1.45% | 3,121 | 28.33% | 11,015 |
| Montrose | 11,218 | 69.17% | 4,776 | 29.45% | 225 | 1.39% | 6,442 | 39.72% | 16,219 |
| Morgan | 6,787 | 68.31% | 3,039 | 30.59% | 110 | 1.10% | 3,748 | 37.72% | 9,936 |
| Otero | 4,947 | 60.48% | 3,164 | 38.68% | 69 | 0.85% | 1,783 | 21.80% | 8,180 |
| Ouray | 1,402 | 51.53% | 1,278 | 46.97% | 41 | 1.51% | 124 | 4.56% | 2,721 |
| Park | 4,781 | 57.21% | 3,445 | 41.22% | 131 | 1.57% | 1,336 | 15.99% | 8,357 |
| Phillips | 1,717 | 73.85% | 582 | 25.03% | 26 | 1.12% | 1,135 | 48.82% | 2,325 |
| Pitkin | 2,784 | 30.08% | 6,335 | 68.44% | 137 | 1.48% | -3,551 | -38.36% | 9,256 |
| Prowers | 3,392 | 71.49% | 1,308 | 27.57% | 45 | 0.95% | 2,084 | 43.92% | 4,745 |
| Pueblo | 31,117 | 46.31% | 35,369 | 52.64% | 701 | 1.04% | -4,252 | -6.33% | 67,187 |
| Rio Blanco | 2,403 | 80.02% | 566 | 18.85% | 34 | 1.14% | 1,837 | 61.17% | 3,003 |
| Rio Grande | 3,448 | 62.40% | 2,006 | 36.30% | 72 | 1.30% | 1,442 | 26.10% | 5,526 |
| Routt | 5,199 | 44.20% | 6,392 | 54.34% | 171 | 1.46% | -1,193 | -10.14% | 11,762 |
| Saguache | 1,163 | 41.49% | 1,594 | 56.87% | 46 | 1.64% | -431 | -15.38% | 2,803 |
| San Juan | 216 | 44.44% | 253 | 52.06% | 17 | 3.50% | -37 | -7.62% | 486 |
| San Miguel | 1,079 | 26.85% | 2,876 | 71.56% | 64 | 1.59% | -1,797 | -44.71% | 4,019 |
| Sedgwick | 971 | 71.40% | 374 | 27.50% | 15 | 1.10% | 597 | 43.90% | 1,360 |
| Summit | 5,370 | 39.10% | 8,144 | 59.29% | 221 | 1.62% | -2,774 | -20.19% | 13,735 |
| Teller | 8,094 | 68.35% | 3,556 | 30.03% | 192 | 1.62% | 4,538 | 38.32% | 11,842 |
| Washington | 2,050 | 81.03% | 455 | 17.98% | 25 | 0.98% | 1,595 | 63.05% | 2,530 |
| Weld | 55,591 | 62.71% | 31,868 | 35.95% | 1,194 | 1.34% | 23,723 | 26.76% | 88,653 |
| Yuma | 3,456 | 75.81% | 1,064 | 23.34% | 39 | 0.85% | 2,392 | 52.47% | 4,559 |
| Total | 1,101,256 | 51.69% | 1,001,725 | 47.02% | 27,344 | 1.29% | 99,531 | 4.67% | 2,130,325 |

Counties that flipped from Democratic to Republican

- Huerfano (largest municipality: Walsenburg)

Counties that flipped from Republican to Democratic

- Clear Creek (largest municipality: Idaho Springs)
- Conejos (largest municipality: Manassa)
- Eagle (largest municipality: Edwards)
- Gunnison (largest municipality: Gunnison)
- La Plata (largest municipality: Durango)
- Routt (largest municipality: Steamboat Springs)
- San Juan (largest municipality: Silverton)

=== Results by congressional district ===
Bush won four of seven congressional districts. Each candidate won a district that elected a representative of the other party.

| District | Bush | Kerry | Representative |
|---|---|---|---|
| 1st | 31% | 68% | Diana DeGette |
| 2nd | 41% | 58% | Mark Udall |
| 3rd | 55% | 44% | Scott McInnis |
| 3rd | 55% | 44% | John Salazar |
| 4th | 58% | 41% | Marilyn Musgrave |
| 5th | 66% | 33% | Joel Hefley |
| 6th | 60% | 39% | Tom Tancredo |
| 7th | 48% | 51% | Bob Beauprez |

== Electors ==
Technically, the voters of Colorado cast their ballots for electors: representatives to the Electoral College. Colorado is allocated 9 electors because it has seven congressional districts and two senators. All candidates who appear on the ballot or qualify to receive write-in votes must submit a list of nine electors who pledge to vote for their candidate and his or her running mate. Whoever wins the majority of votes in the state is awarded all nine electoral votes. Their chosen electors then vote for president and vice president. Although electors are pledged to their candidate and running mate, they are not obligated to vote for them. An elector who votes for someone other than his or her candidate is known as a faithless elector.

The electors of each state and the District of Columbia met on December 13, 2004, to cast their votes for president and vice president. The Electoral College itself never meets as one body. Instead, the electors from each state and the District of Columbia met in their respective capitols.

The following were the members of the Electoral College from the state. All were pledged to and voted for George W. Bush and Dick Cheney.

1. Theodore S. Halaby
2. Robert A. Martinez
3. Lilly Y. Nunez
4. Cynthia H. Murphy
5. Sylvia Morgan-Smith
6. Diane B. Gallagher
7. Vicki A. Edwards
8. Frances W. Owens
9. Booker T. Graves
