= Lake Meredith (Colorado) =

Lake in Colorado, United States

- Lake Meredith Reservoir; Meredith Reservoir
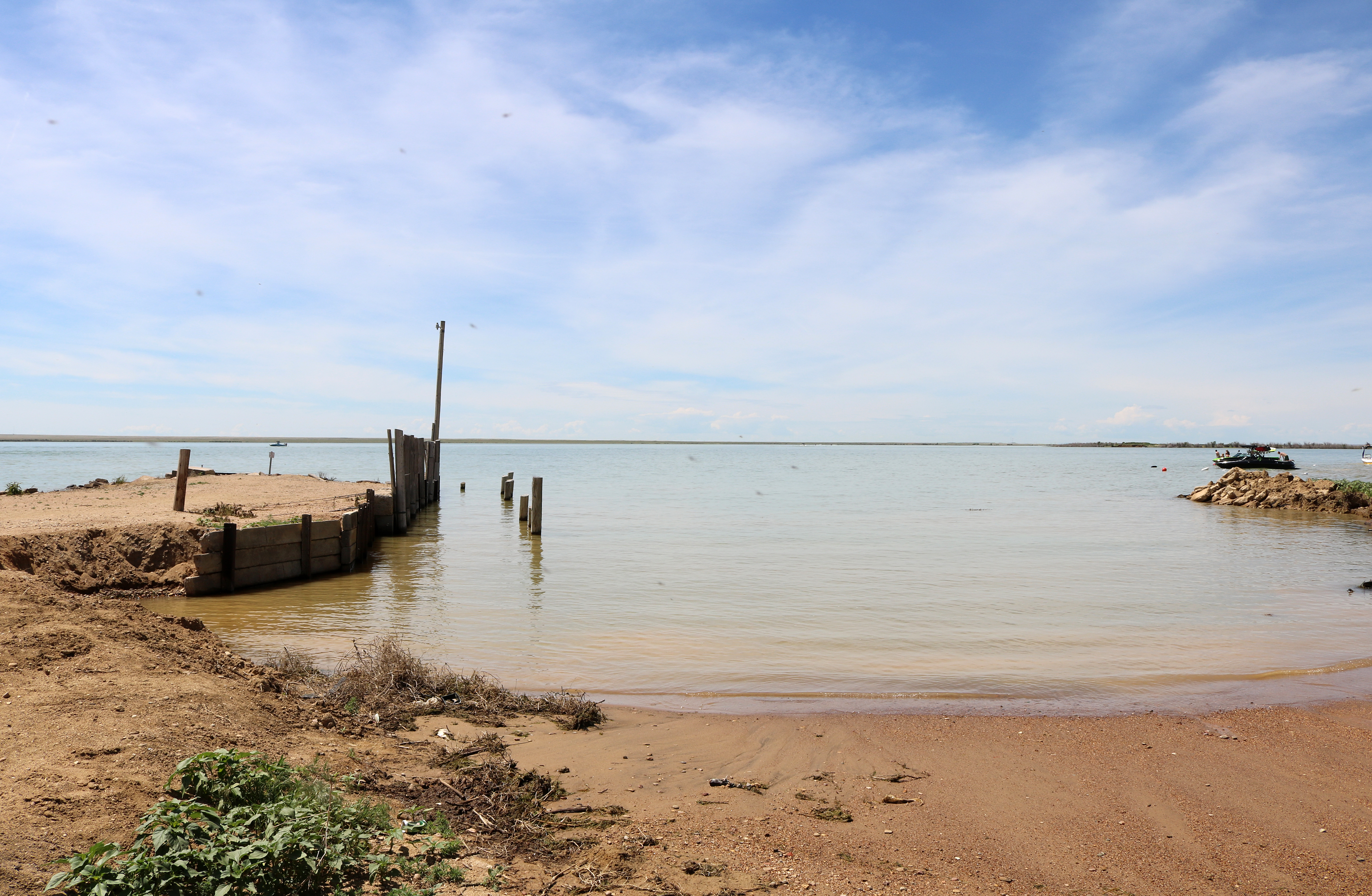
- The lake's dirt boat ramp

- Lake Meredith
- Location: Crowley County, Colorado
- Coordinates: 38°11′27″N 103°42′13″W
- Max. length: 4 mi (6.4 km)
- Max. width: 2 mi (3.2 km)
- Average depth: 6 ft (1.8 m)
- Water volume: 41,000 acre⋅ft (51,000,000 m^{3})
- Surface elevation: 1,297 m (4,255 ft)
- Website: https://crowleycounty.colorado.gov/crowley-county/camping-lakes/lake-meredith

Lake Meredith is a lake in Crowley County, Colorado, just south of Sugar City.

Sources differ on its name, with some calling it Lake Meredith, Lake Meredith Reservoir, or Meredith Reservoir.

The lake is shallow, so the constant winds in the area make it turbid. The average depth is six feet.

== Recreation ==
The lake is popular among jet skiers. Camping at the lake is free, but amenities are limited. There is one dirt boat ramp and one jet ski ramp.
