= 1932 United States presidential election in Colorado =

- November 8, 1932

All 6 Colorado votes to the Electoral College

Nominee	Franklin D. Roosevelt	Herbert Hoover
Party	Democratic	Republican
Home state	New York	California
Running mate	John Nance Garner	Charles Curtis
Electoral vote	6	0
Popular vote	250,877	189,617
Percentage	54.81%	41.43%
County results
Roosevelt
40–50%
50–60%
60–70%
70–80%
Hoover
40–50%
President before election
Herbert Hoover
Republican
Elected President
Franklin D. Roosevelt
Democratic

The 1932 United States presidential election in Colorado took place on November 8, 1932, as part of the 1932 United States presidential election. State voters chose six representatives, or electors, to the Electoral College, who voted for president and vice president.

Colorado was won by Governor Franklin D. Roosevelt (D–New York), running with Speaker John Nance Garner, with 54.81 percent of the popular vote, against incumbent President Herbert Hoover (R–California), running with Vice President Charles Curtis, with 41.43% of the popular vote. As of the 2024 presidential election, this is the last occasion when Elbert County voted for a Democratic presidential candidate. Colorado voted 4.4% to the right of the nation in this election. This marks the last presidential election until 1992 in which an incumbent Republican would lose Colorado in a re-election bid, along with a non-incumbent Democrat subsequently winning the state.

== Results ==
1932 United States presidential election in Colorado
Party	Candidate	Votes	%
Democratic	Franklin D. Roosevelt	250,877	54.81%
Republican	Herbert Hoover (inc.)	189,617	41.43%
Socialist	Norman Thomas	13,591	2.97%
Prohibition	William David Upshaw	1,928	0.42%
Communist	William Z. Foster	787	0.17%
Farmer-Labor	Jacob Coxey	469	0.10%
Socialist Labor	Verne L. Reynolds	427	0.09%
Total votes		457,696	100%

=== Results by county ===
County	Franklin Delano Roosevelt Democratic		Herbert Clark Hoover Republican		Norman Mattoon Thomas Socialist		William David Upshaw Prohibition		Various candidates Other parties		Margin	
County	%	#	%	#	%	#	%	#	%	#	%	#
San Juan	76.30%	544	22.44%	160	1.26%	9	0.00%	0	0.00%	0	53.86%	384
Pitkin	71.84%	727	23.62%	239	3.95%	40	0.20%	2	0.40%	4	48.22%	488
Las Animas	69.61%	8,964	28.35%	3,651	1.52%	196	0.21%	27	0.30%	39	41.26%	5,313
Dolores	67.15%	464	26.48%	183	3.04%	21	0.72%	5	2.60%	18	40.67%	281
Conejos	68.58%	2,641	30.90%	1,190	0.34%	13	0.10%	4	0.08%	3	37.68%	1,451
San Miguel	66.93%	862	29.74%	383	2.25%	29	0.31%	4	0.78%	10	37.19%	479
Chaffee	65.96%	2,393	29.24%	1,061	4.13%	150	0.47%	17	0.19%	7	36.71%	1,332
Costilla	66.59%	1,475	31.92%	707	0.90%	20	0.14%	3	0.45%	10	34.67%	768
Archuleta	65.82%	928	32.77%	462	0.71%	10	0.14%	2	0.57%	8	33.05%	466
Gilpin	64.55%	539	32.46%	271	2.51%	21	0.24%	2	0.24%	2	32.10%	268
Montezuma	63.85%	1,779	31.84%	887	3.23%	90	0.54%	15	0.54%	15	32.02%	892
Teller	61.63%	1,534	30.21%	752	7.83%	195	0.20%	5	0.12%	3	31.42%	782
Eagle	64.01%	1,348	33.81%	712	1.80%	38	0.14%	3	0.24%	5	30.20%	636
Gunnison	63.81%	1,807	34.78%	985	0.32%	9	0.11%	3	0.99%	28	29.03%	822
Park	60.92%	1,057	33.26%	577	4.84%	84	0.29%	5	0.69%	12	27.67%	480
Lake	62.54%	1,436	34.89%	801	1.96%	45	0.09%	2	0.52%	12	27.66%	635
Summit	61.65%	397	34.78%	224	2.64%	17	0.16%	1	0.78%	5	26.86%	173
Ouray	61.28%	706	34.55%	398	3.13%	36	0.26%	3	0.78%	9	26.74%	308
Custer	60.80%	729	34.45%	413	3.42%	41	0.83%	10	0.50%	6	26.36%	316
Mineral	55.41%	210	29.55%	112	14.51%	55	0.26%	1	0.26%	1	25.86%	98
Washington	60.77%	2,378	35.39%	1,385	2.25%	88	1.00%	39	0.59%	23	25.38%	993
Garfield	61.25%	2,946	36.05%	1,734	2.12%	102	0.12%	6	0.46%	22	25.20%	1,212
Huerfano	61.67%	4,159	36.92%	2,490	0.80%	54	0.15%	10	0.46%	31	24.75%	1,669
Routt	59.95%	2,643	35.56%	1,568	3.63%	160	0.45%	20	0.41%	18	24.38%	1,075
Alamosa	60.58%	2,141	36.96%	1,306	2.12%	75	0.25%	9	0.08%	3	23.63%	835
Rio Grande	59.63%	2,539	36.57%	1,557	2.68%	114	0.85%	36	0.28%	12	23.06%	982
Adams	59.41%	4,554	36.69%	2,812	3.39%	260	0.20%	15	0.31%	24	22.73%	1,742
Baca	56.67%	2,247	34.02%	1,349	7.14%	283	1.64%	65	0.53%	21	22.65%	898
Clear Creek	60.04%	939	38.17%	597	1.66%	26	0.06%	1	0.06%	1	21.87%	342
Crowley	59.80%	1,266	38.31%	811	0.94%	20	0.66%	14	0.28%	6	21.49%	455
Phillips	56.06%	1,453	34.84%	903	8.26%	214	0.54%	14	0.31%	8	21.22%	550
Moffat	57.67%	1,388	36.56%	880	4.86%	117	0.71%	17	0.21%	5	21.11%	508
Saguache	58.06%	1,427	37.88%	931	2.56%	63	0.77%	19	0.73%	18	20.18%	496
Mesa	56.59%	6,682	37.16%	4,388	5.15%	608	0.65%	77	0.44%	52	19.43%	2,294
Yuma	56.48%	3,220	37.34%	2,129	4.56%	260	1.25%	71	0.37%	21	19.14%	1,091
La Plata	57.21%	3,156	38.50%	2,124	3.46%	191	0.40%	22	0.44%	24	18.71%	1,032
Pueblo	58.15%	15,325	39.52%	10,414	1.55%	409	0.32%	85	0.46%	121	18.63%	4,911
Bent	58.10%	1,948	39.58%	1,327	0.95%	32	0.84%	28	0.54%	18	18.52%	621
Hinsdale	56.10%	138	38.21%	94	5.28%	13	0.41%	1	0.00%	0	17.89%	44
Sedgwick	56.97%	1,288	39.10%	884	2.65%	60	0.97%	22	0.31%	7	17.87%	404
Delta	54.80%	3,467	37.00%	2,341	7.06%	447	0.90%	57	0.24%	15	17.80%	1,126
Kiowa	56.55%	1,113	39.08%	769	1.88%	37	2.29%	45	0.20%	4	17.48%	344
Cheyenne	55.04%	1,042	39.41%	746	2.43%	46	2.59%	49	0.53%	10	15.64%	296
Lincoln	55.97%	1,979	41.09%	1,453	1.78%	63	0.88%	31	0.28%	10	14.88%	526
Arapahoe	54.46%	5,796	40.28%	4,287	4.44%	472	0.38%	40	0.44%	47	14.18%	1,509
Fremont	53.49%	4,295	41.03%	3,294	4.41%	354	0.59%	47	0.49%	39	12.47%	1,001
Grand	55.27%	771	42.87%	598	1.79%	25	0.07%	1	0.00%	0	12.40%	173
Otero	54.99%	5,107	42.79%	3,974	1.31%	122	0.69%	64	0.22%	20	12.20%	1,133
Elbert	53.64%	1,649	41.54%	1,277	3.42%	105	0.98%	30	0.42%	13	12.10%	372
Douglas	54.52%	1,061	42.96%	836	1.95%	38	0.26%	5	0.31%	6	11.56%	225
Montrose	51.79%	2,516	41.00%	1,992	6.15%	299	0.84%	41	0.21%	10	10.79%	524
Kit Carson	53.07%	2,289	42.55%	1,835	2.64%	114	1.32%	57	0.42%	18	10.53%	454
Denver	53.36%	72,868	43.48%	59,372	2.62%	3,575	0.12%	170	0.42%	573	9.88%	13,496
Rio Blanco	53.46%	826	44.47%	687	1.62%	25	0.19%	3	0.26%	4	9.00%	139
Prowers	52.74%	3,020	44.85%	2,568	1.03%	59	0.82%	47	0.56%	32	7.89%	452
Logan	52.41%	3,641	45.44%	3,157	1.25%	87	0.65%	45	0.24%	17	6.97%	484
Boulder	50.35%	8,412	44.81%	7,487	4.31%	720	0.40%	66	0.13%	22	5.54%	925
Jefferson	49.99%	6,023	45.83%	5,522	3.59%	432	0.30%	36	0.29%	35	4.16%	501
Jackson	50.49%	415	47.45%	390	1.22%	10	0.49%	4	0.36%	3	3.04%	25
Weld	48.73%	11,182	46.87%	10,754	3.50%	803	0.61%	140	0.29%	66	1.87%	428
El Paso	46.62%	11,353	49.35%	12,017	3.21%	782	0.56%	136	0.25%	62	-2.73%	-664
Morgan	47.02%	3,181	49.82%	3,370	2.35%	159	0.62%	42	0.19%	13	-2.79%	-189
Larimer	46.00%	6,494	49.87%	7,040	3.29%	465	0.63%	89	0.21%	30	-3.87%	-546

==== Counties that flipped from Republican to Democratic ====
- Grand
- Rio Blanco
- Jackson
- Moffat
- Douglas
- Yuma
- Montezuma
- Boulder
- Weld
- Sedgwick
- Hinsdale
- Routt
- Garfield
- Eagle
- Summit
- Jefferson
- Clear Creek
- Gilpin
- Arapahoe
- Chaffee
- Gunnison
- Pitkin
- Dolores
- Ouray
- La Plata
- Rio Grande
- Huerfano
- Alamosa
- Bent
- Otero
- Baca
- Cheyenne
- Mesa
- Delta
- Montrose
- Park
- Fremont
- Custer
- Elbert
- Teller
- Washington
- Logan
- Crowley
- Phillips
- Lincoln
- Prowers
- Kit Carson
- Kiowa
- Adams
- Archuleta
- Denver
- Pueblo
- Saguache
- San Miguel
