= Crowley School =

- U.S. National Register of Historic Places
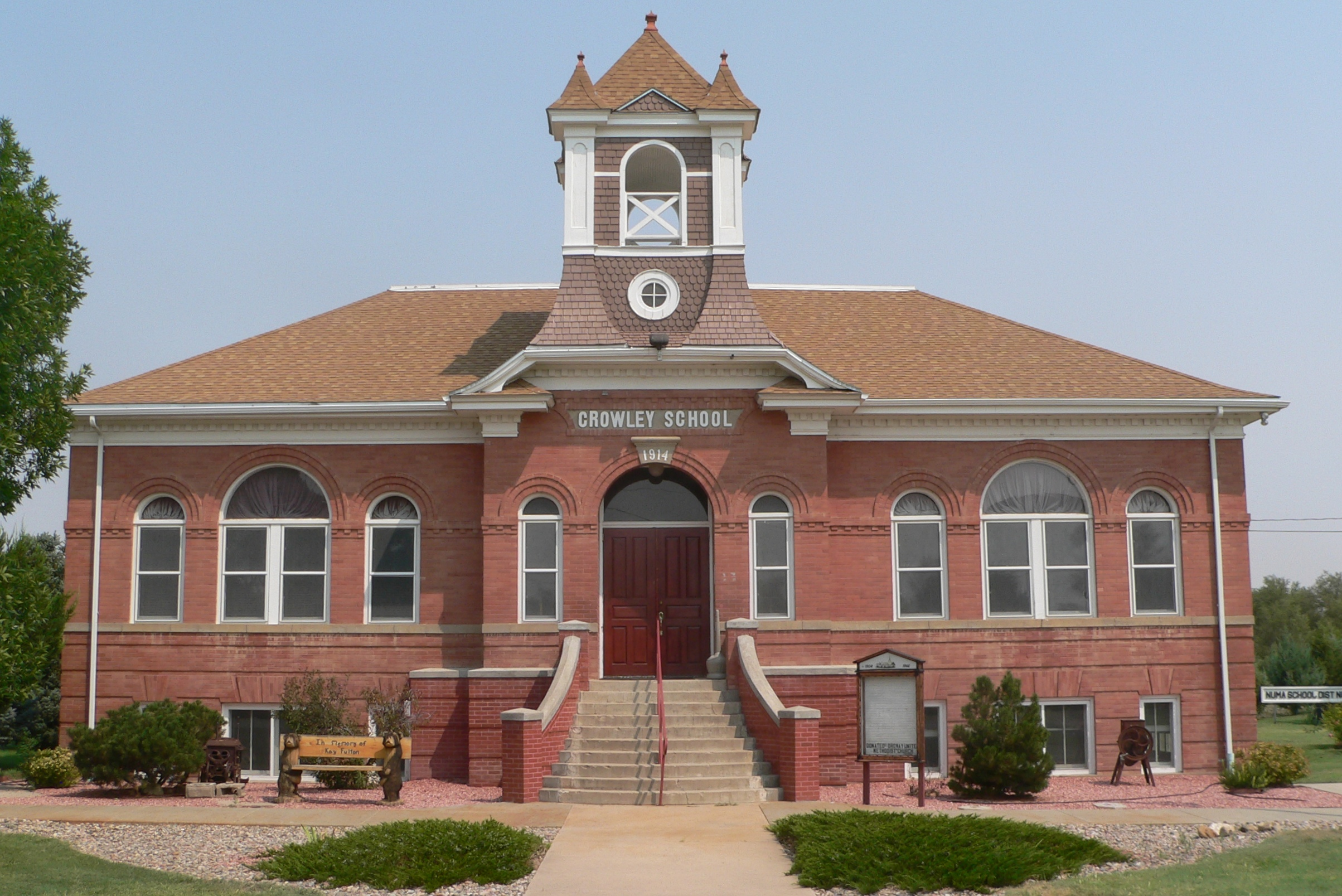

- Location within Colorado Location within the United States
- Location: 301 Main St., Crowley, Colorado
- Coordinates: 38°11′41″N 103°51′12″W
- Area: 3.7 acres (1.5 ha)
- Built: 1914
- Architectural style: Renaissance Revival
- NRHP reference No.: 99000897
- Added to NRHP: July 28, 1999

The Crowley School, at 301 Main St. in Crowley, Colorado, was built in 1914. Also known as the Crowley County Heritage Center, it is a Renaissance Revival style school building. It was listed on the National Register of Historic Places in 1999. It is currently the only property listed on the National Register in Crowley County, Colorado.

It was deemed significant for its architecture. Its NRHP nomination, written by the town's mayor, asserted:

The building is an unusual example of Second Renaissance Revival. This Renaissance Revival style is best identified by its horizontal divisions defined by belt or string courses and by the use of different treatments in each division, notably changes in the shapes, sizes, and surrounds of windows. Arched openings and projecting cornices with dentils are also characteristic of this style. The Crowley School possesses all these distinctive qualities. However, its unusual and elaborate cupola creates an interesting expression of the style. The Second Renaissance Revival was most common in Colorado between 1900 and 1930. The vernacular examples are generally less ornate and on a smaller scale. The Crowley School, its elaborate cupola notwithstanding, is indicative of that pattern. The school is also the only known example of the style in Crowley County.

And further the school is the oldest surviving public building in the county, the Crowley County Courthouse having not been built until 1915, and it having outlasted any earlier schools in the county.

It is now the Crowley County Heritage Center.
