= 1940 United States presidential election in Colorado =

- November 5, 1940

All 6 Colorado votes to the Electoral College

Nominee	Wendell Willkie	Franklin D. Roosevelt
Party	Republican	Democratic
Home state	New York	New York
Running mate	Charles L. McNary	Henry A. Wallace
Electoral vote	6	0
Popular vote	279,576	265,554
Percentage	50.92%	48.37%
County results
Willkie
50–60%
60–70%
Roosevelt
50–60%
60–70%
President before election
Franklin D. Roosevelt
Democratic
Elected President
Franklin D. Roosevelt
Democratic

The 1940 United States presidential election in Colorado took place on November 5, 1940, as part of the 1940 United States presidential election. State voters chose six representatives, or electors, to the Electoral College, who voted for president and vice president.

Colorado was won by Wendell Willkie (R–New York), running with Minority Leader Charles L. McNary, with 50.92% of the popular vote, against incumbent President Franklin D. Roosevelt (D–New York), running with Secretary Henry A. Wallace, with 48.37% of the popular vote. Colorado was one of eight states won by Willkie that Roosevelt had carried four years prior; the state swung from a 23-point Democratic landslide in 1936 to a narrow 2.5-point Republican win in 1940.

== Results ==
1940 United States presidential election in Colorado
Party	Candidate	Votes	%
Republican	Wendell Willkie	279,576	50.92%
Democratic	Franklin D. Roosevelt (inc.)	265,554	48.37%
Socialist	Norman Thomas	1,899	0.35%
Prohibition	Roger Babson	1,597	0.29%
Communist	Earl Browder	378	0.07%
Total votes		549,004	100%

=== Results by county ===
County	Wendell Lewis Willkie Republican		Franklin Delano Roosevelt Democratic		Norman Mattoon Thomas Socialist		Roger Ward Babson Prohibition		Earl Russell Browder Communist		Margin	
County	%	#	%	#	%	#	%	#	%	#	%	#
Kit Carson	68.69%	2,481	30.45%	1,100	0.47%	17	0.33%	12	0.06%	2	38.23%	1,381
Rio Blanco	65.49%	1,021	34.00%	530	0.26%	4	0.26%	4	0.00%	0	31.49%	491
Elbert	65.04%	1,756	34.59%	934	0.26%	7	0.11%	3	0.00%	0	30.44%	822
Morgan	64.30%	4,654	34.91%	2,527	0.25%	18	0.51%	37	0.03%	2	29.39%	2,127
Yuma	64.11%	3,531	34.80%	1,917	0.60%	33	0.38%	21	0.11%	6	29.30%	1,614
Washington	62.63%	2,390	36.77%	1,403	0.26%	10	0.29%	11	0.05%	2	25.86%	987
Larimer	62.15%	10,720	37.12%	6,402	0.27%	46	0.45%	77	0.02%	3	25.03%	4,318
Crowley	62.21%	1,419	37.26%	850	0.22%	5	0.31%	7	0.00%	0	24.95%	569
Kiowa	61.86%	986	37.52%	598	0.25%	4	0.38%	6	0.00%	0	24.34%	388
Logan	61.38%	4,613	37.51%	2,819	0.23%	17	0.85%	64	0.03%	2	23.87%	1,794
Douglas	61.57%	1,298	38.00%	801	0.38%	8	0.05%	1	0.00%	0	23.58%	497
Weld	59.72%	16,129	39.44%	10,653	0.36%	97	0.41%	111	0.07%	19	20.27%	5,476
Sedgwick	59.86%	1,448	39.64%	959	0.25%	6	0.25%	6	0.00%	0	20.21%	489
Lincoln	59.57%	1,780	39.66%	1,185	0.27%	8	0.47%	14	0.03%	1	19.91%	595
Moffat	59.23%	1,556	40.20%	1,056	0.23%	6	0.34%	9	0.00%	0	19.03%	500
Jackson	59.23%	526	40.20%	357	0.45%	4	0.11%	1	0.00%	0	19.03%	169
Montezuma	59.25%	2,313	40.29%	1,573	0.38%	15	0.05%	2	0.03%	1	18.95%	740
Hinsdale	58.82%	150	40.39%	103	0.39%	1	0.39%	1	0.00%	0	18.43%	47
Custer	57.37%	685	41.46%	495	0.34%	4	0.75%	9	0.08%	1	15.91%	190
Rio Grande	57.40%	3,075	41.85%	2,242	0.19%	10	0.56%	30	0.00%	0	15.55%	833
Delta	57.07%	4,175	41.61%	3,044	0.68%	50	0.57%	42	0.05%	4	15.46%	1,131
La Plata	57.39%	3,871	42.03%	2,835	0.30%	20	0.21%	14	0.07%	5	15.36%	1,036
Garfield	57.18%	2,894	42.30%	2,141	0.22%	11	0.28%	14	0.02%	1	14.88%	753
Prowers	56.87%	3,115	42.16%	2,309	0.24%	13	0.60%	33	0.13%	7	14.72%	806
Baca	56.53%	1,567	42.10%	1,167	0.76%	21	0.54%	15	0.07%	2	14.43%	400
Saguache	55.57%	1,462	43.41%	1,142	0.53%	14	0.42%	11	0.08%	2	12.16%	320
Phillips	54.30%	1,168	42.72%	919	1.58%	34	1.30%	28	0.09%	2	11.58%	249
El Paso	55.31%	16,766	43.94%	13,320	0.30%	91	0.43%	131	0.02%	7	11.37%	3,446
Dolores	54.75%	478	43.41%	379	0.80%	7	0.80%	7	0.23%	2	11.34%	99
Grand	55.19%	1,074	44.35%	863	0.31%	6	0.15%	3	0.00%	0	10.84%	211
Montrose	54.62%	3,744	43.95%	3,013	0.83%	57	0.45%	31	0.15%	10	10.66%	731
Fremont	54.82%	5,150	44.56%	4,186	0.28%	26	0.31%	29	0.03%	3	10.26%	964
Cheyenne	54.43%	915	45.09%	758	0.30%	5	0.18%	3	0.00%	0	9.34%	157
San Juan	54.20%	452	45.32%	378	0.12%	1	0.36%	3	0.00%	0	8.87%	74
Otero	54.11%	5,459	45.27%	4,567	0.20%	20	0.41%	41	0.01%	1	8.84%	892
Archuleta	53.71%	869	45.98%	744	0.19%	3	0.12%	2	0.00%	0	7.73%	125
Boulder	53.22%	10,525	45.71%	9,039	0.67%	132	0.35%	70	0.05%	10	7.51%	1,486
Park	52.98%	986	46.70%	869	0.27%	5	0.05%	1	0.00%	0	6.29%	117
Jefferson	52.81%	8,780	46.59%	7,745	0.40%	66	0.14%	24	0.06%	10	6.23%	1,035
Bent	51.67%	1,899	47.86%	1,759	0.22%	8	0.22%	8	0.03%	1	3.81%	140
Arapahoe	50.89%	7,988	48.24%	7,571	0.59%	93	0.21%	33	0.07%	11	2.66%	417
Adams	50.16%	4,767	49.18%	4,674	0.35%	33	0.26%	25	0.04%	4	0.98%	93
Ouray	49.12%	589	50.54%	606	0.17%	2	0.17%	2	0.00%	0	-1.42%	-17
Pitkin	48.50%	484	50.40%	503	0.90%	9	0.20%	2	0.00%	0	-1.90%	-19
Gilpin	48.65%	413	50.77%	431	0.35%	3	0.24%	2	0.00%	0	-2.12%	-18
Mesa	47.27%	7,049	51.60%	7,694	0.62%	93	0.49%	73	0.02%	3	-4.33%	-645
Alamosa	47.39%	2,243	52.12%	2,467	0.04%	2	0.27%	13	0.17%	8	-4.73%	-224
Chaffee	46.91%	1,933	52.24%	2,153	0.51%	21	0.29%	12	0.05%	2	-5.34%	-220
Denver	46.91%	81,328	52.45%	90,938	0.33%	578	0.21%	359	0.10%	168	-5.54%	-9,610
Summit	46.78%	479	52.73%	540	0.20%	2	0.29%	3	0.00%	0	-5.96%	-61
Gunnison	46.43%	1,556	52.85%	1,771	0.63%	21	0.09%	3	0.00%	0	-6.42%	-215
San Miguel	45.94%	729	53.62%	851	0.13%	2	0.19%	3	0.13%	2	-7.69%	-122
Mineral	45.08%	229	53.74%	273	0.39%	2	0.20%	1	0.59%	3	-8.66%	-44
Conejos	44.81%	2,028	54.82%	2,481	0.27%	12	0.09%	4	0.02%	1	-10.01%	-453
Routt	44.07%	2,212	55.29%	2,775	0.30%	15	0.24%	12	0.10%	5	-11.22%	-563
Clear Creek	44.15%	1,018	55.55%	1,281	0.22%	5	0.04%	1	0.04%	1	-11.41%	-263
Pueblo	42.84%	14,185	56.79%	18,805	0.09%	31	0.21%	71	0.07%	23	-13.95%	-4,620
Eagle	42.00%	1,077	57.49%	1,474	0.35%	9	0.04%	1	0.12%	3	-15.48%	-397
Huerfano	40.65%	2,738	59.00%	3,974	0.15%	10	0.10%	7	0.10%	7	-18.35%	-1,236
Lake	40.30%	1,403	59.26%	2,063	0.29%	10	0.06%	2	0.09%	3	-18.96%	-660
Costilla	39.40%	1,121	59.68%	1,698	0.25%	7	0.32%	9	0.35%	10	-20.28%	-577
Teller	37.60%	1,268	61.80%	2,084	0.44%	15	0.12%	4	0.03%	1	-24.20%	-816
Las Animas	35.53%	4,859	64.10%	8,766	0.11%	15	0.17%	23	0.09%	12	-28.57%	-3,907

==== Counties that flipped from Democratic to Republican ====
- Adams
- Arapahoe
- Phillips
- El Paso
- Dolores
- Prowers
- Baca
- Saguache
- Kiowa
- Grand
- Logan
- Crowley
- Larimer
- Yuma
- Washington
- Morgan
- Douglas
- Weld
- Sedgwick
- Lincoln
- Jackson
- Moffat
- Montezuma
- Rio Grande
- Hinsdale
- Custer
- La Plata
- Garfield
- Delta
- Montrose
- Park
- Fremont
- Cheyenne
- Otero
- San Juan
- Archuleta
- Boulder
- Bent
- Jefferson
