= Paoli, Colorado =

Town in Phillips County, Colorado, United States

- Town
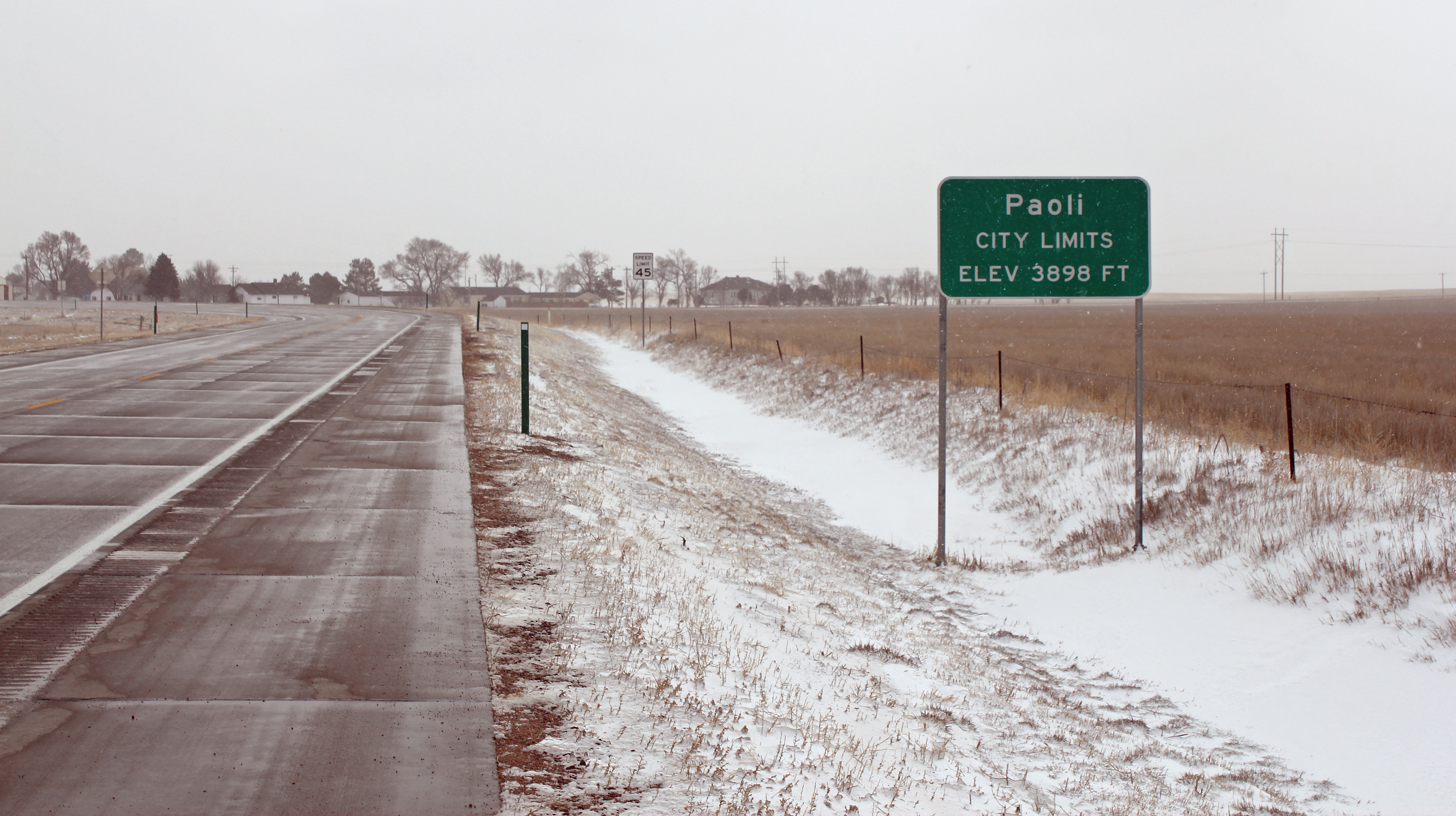
- Entering Paoli from the west on U.S. Route 6 (2013)

- Location within Phillips County and Colorado
- Coordinates: 40°36′46″N 102°28′18″W
- Country: United States
- State: Colorado
- County: Phillips
- Incorporated: August 6, 1930
- Named for: Pasquale Paoli

Area
  - Total: 0.30 sq mi (0.77 km^{2})
  - Land: 0.30 sq mi (0.77 km^{2})
  - Water: 0 sq mi (0.00 km^{2})
- Elevation: 3,895 ft (1,187 m)

Population (2020)
  - Total: 51
  - Density: 170/sq mi (66/km^{2})
- Time zone: UTC−7 (MST)
  - Summer (DST): UTC−6 (MDT)
- ZIP Code: 80746 (PO Box)
- Area code: 970
- FIPS code: 08-57245
- GNIS ID: 2413107

Paoli is a statutory town in Phillips County, Colorado, United States. As of the 2020 census, its population was 51.

== Description ==
A post office called Paoli has been in operation since 1888. The community was named by a railroad official after Paoli, Pennsylvania.

== Geography ==
According to the United States Census Bureau, the town has a total area of 0.3 square miles (0.78 km^{2}), all of it land.

== Demographics ==
Historical population
Census	Pop.	Note	%±
1940	85		—
1950	91		7.1%
1960	81		−11.0%
1970	52		−35.8%
1980	81		55.8%
1990	29		−64.2%
2000	42		44.8%
2010	34		−19.0%
2020	51		50.0%
U.S. Decennial Census

== See also ==
- List of municipalities in Colorado
