= Phillips County, Colorado =

County in Colorado, United States

- County
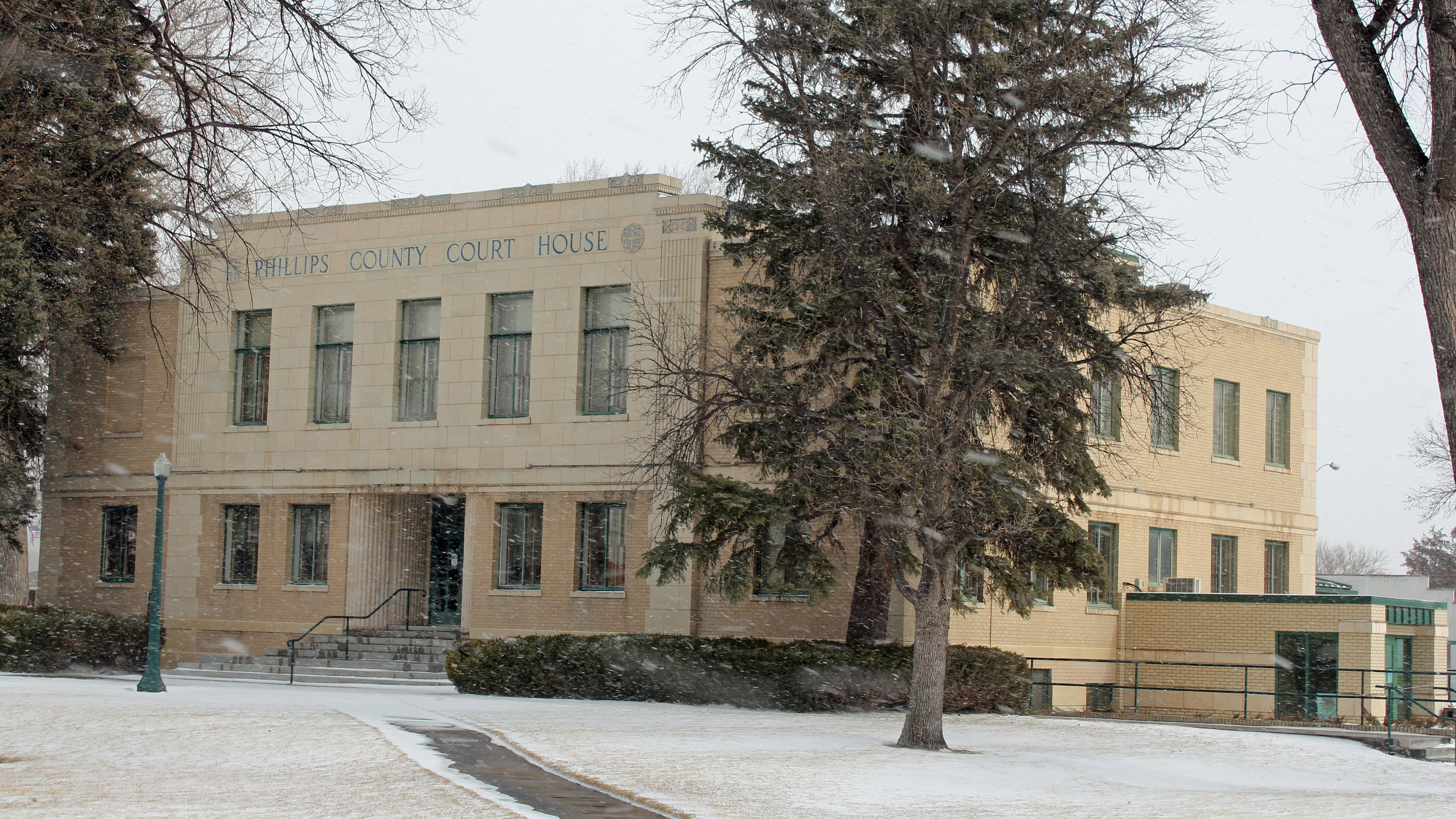
- Phillips County Courthouse

- Seal

- Location within the U.S. state of Colorado
- Coordinates: 40.59°N 102.35°W
- Country: United States
- State: Colorado
- Founded: March 27, 1889
- Named for: R.O. Phillips
- Seat: Holyoke
- Largest city: Holyoke

Area
  - Total: 688 sq mi (1,780 km^{2})
  - Land: 688 sq mi (1,780 km^{2})
  - Water: 0.1 sq mi (0.26 km^{2}) 0.02%

Population (2020)
  - Total: 4,530
  - Estimate (2025): 4,420 ▼
  - Density: 6.58/sq mi (2.54/km^{2})
- Time zone: UTC−7 (Mountain)
  - Summer (DST): UTC−6 (MDT)
- Congressional district: 4th
- Website: phillipscounty.colorado.gov

Phillips County is a county located in the U.S. state of Colorado. As of the 2020 census, the population was 4,530. The county seat is Holyoke. The county was named in honor of R.O. Phillips, a secretary of the Lincoln Land Company, which organized several towns in Colorado.

== Geography ==
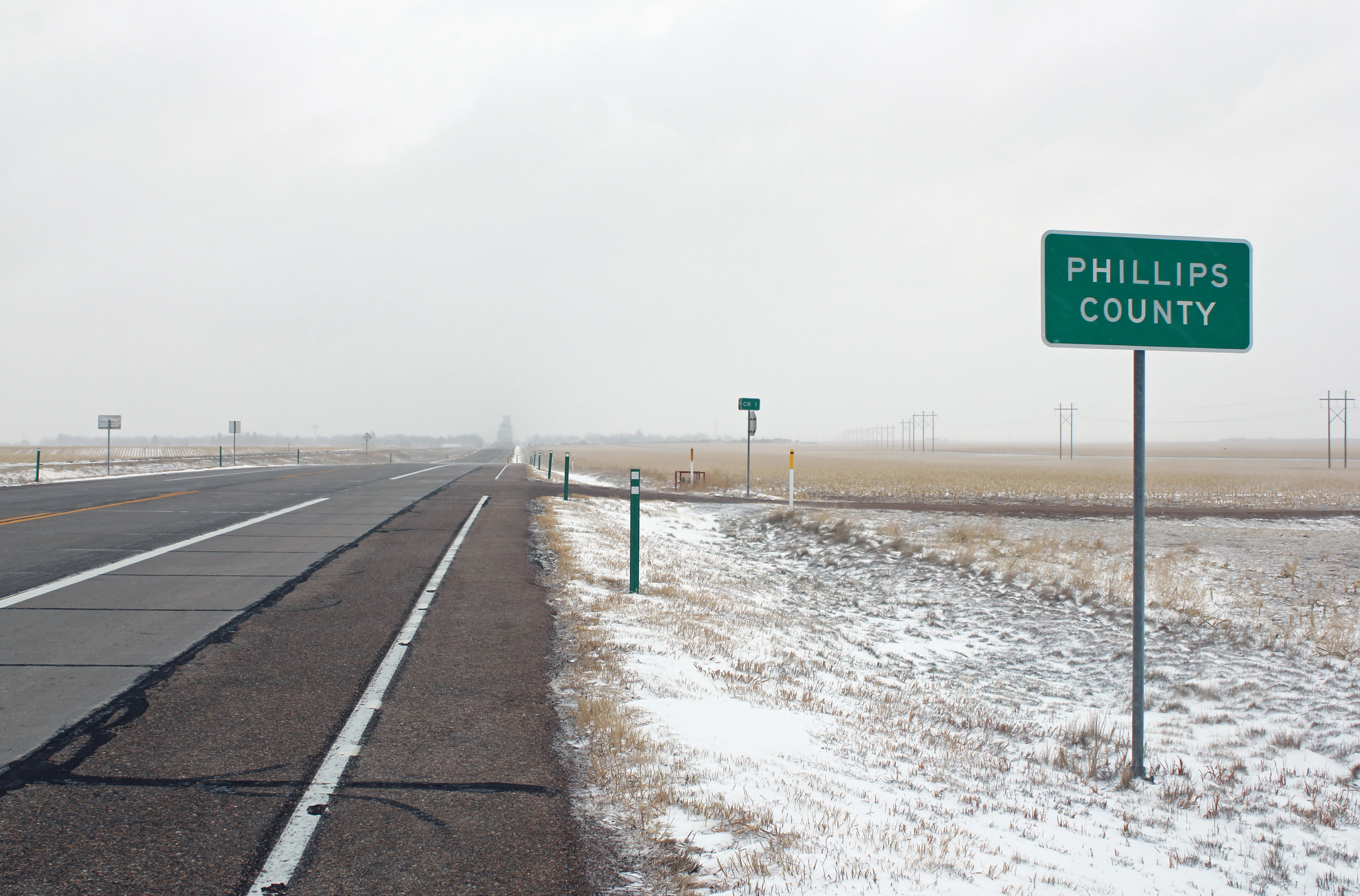
Entering Phillips County from the west on U.S. Highway 6.

According to the U.S. Census Bureau, the county has a total area of 688 square miles (1,780 km^{2}), of which 688 square miles (1,780 km^{2}) is land and 0.1 square miles (0.26 km^{2}) (0.02%) is water.

=== Adjacent counties ===
- Sedgwick County—north
- Perkins County, Nebraska—northeast
- Chase County, Nebraska—east
- Yuma County—south
- Logan County—west

=== Major highways ===
- U.S. Highway 6
- U.S. Highway 385
- State Highway 23
- State Highway 59

== Demographics ==
Historical population
Census	Pop.	Note	%±
1890	2,642		—
1900	1,583		−40.1%
1910	3,179		100.8%
1920	5,499		73.0%
1930	5,797		5.4%
1940	4,948		−14.6%
1950	4,924		−0.5%
1960	4,440		−9.8%
1970	4,131		−7.0%
1980	4,542		9.9%
1990	4,189		−7.8%
2000	4,480		6.9%
2010	4,442		−0.8%
2020	4,530		2.0%
2025 (est.)	4,420	▼	−2.4%
U.S. Decennial Census; 1790–1960 1900–1990; 1990–2000 2010–2020

=== 2020 census ===
As of the 2020 census, the county had a population of 4,530. Of the residents, 24.9% were under the age of 18 and 21.3% were 65 years of age or older; the median age was 41.4 years. For every 100 females there were 95.7 males, and for every 100 females age 18 and over there were 94.6 males. 0.0% of residents lived in urban areas and 100.0% lived in rural areas.

Phillips County, Colorado – Racial and ethnic composition Note: the US Census treats Hispanic/Latino as an ethnic category. This table excludes Latinos from the racial categories and assigns them to a separate category. Hispanics/Latinos may be of any race.
Race / Ethnicity (NH = Non-Hispanic)	Pop 2000	Pop 2010	Pop 2020	% 2000	% 2010	% 2020
White alone (NH)	3,865	3,526	3,246	86.27%	79.38%	71.66%
Black or African American alone (NH)	9	14	10	0.20%	0.32%	0.22%
Native American or Alaska Native alone (NH)	11	13	12	0.25%	0.29%	0.26%
Asian alone (NH)	18	26	22	0.40%	0.59%	0.49%
Pacific Islander alone (NH)	1	4	1	0.02%	0.09%	0.02%
Other race alone (NH)	8	4	5	0.18%	0.09%	0.11%
Mixed race or Multiracial (NH)	41	25	79	0.92%	0.56%	1.74%
Hispanic or Latino (any race)	527	830	1,155	11.76%	18.69%	25.50%
Total	4,480	4,442	4,530	100.00%	100.00%	100.00%

The racial makeup of the county was 77.3% White, 0.4% Black or African American, 1.1% American Indian and Alaska Native, 0.5% Asian, 0.0% Native Hawaiian and Pacific Islander, 10.6% from some other race, and 10.0% from two or more races. Hispanic or Latino residents of any race comprised 25.5% of the population.

There were 1,814 households in the county, of which 31.5% had children under the age of 18 living with them and 22.5% had a female householder with no spouse or partner present. About 28.3% of all households were made up of individuals and 15.7% had someone living alone who was 65 years of age or older.

There were 2,025 housing units, of which 10.4% were vacant. Among occupied housing units, 72.3% were owner-occupied and 27.7% were renter-occupied. The homeowner vacancy rate was 1.6% and the rental vacancy rate was 11.9%.

=== 2000 census ===
At the 2000 census there were 4,480 people, 1,781 households, and 1,239 families living in the county. The population density was 6 people per square mile (2.3 people/km^{2}). There were 2,014 housing units at an average density of 3 units per square mile (1.2 units/km^{2}). The racial makeup of the county was 93.04% White, 0.20% Black or African American, 0.29% Native American, 0.40% Asian, 0.02% Pacific Islander, 4.71% from other races, and 1.34% from two or more races. 11.76% of the population were Hispanic or Latino of any race. Of the 1,781 households 32.90% had children under the age of 18 living with them, 61.20% were married couples living together, 5.60% had a female householder with no husband present, and 30.40% were non-families. Of all households 27.50% were one person and 14.30% were one person aged 65 or older. The average household size was 2.47 and the average family size was 3.01.

The age distribution was 26.90% under the age of 18, 6.30% from 18 to 24, 25.30% from 25 to 44, 22.20% from 45 to 64, and 19.40% 65 or older. The median age was 40 years. For every 100 females there were 93.40 males. For every 100 females age 18 and over, there were 90.50 males.

The median household income was $32,177 and the median family income was $38,144. Males had a median income of $30,095 versus $18,682 for females. The per capita income for the county was $16,394. About 8.80% of families and 11.60% of the population were below the poverty line, including 14.70% of those under age 18 and 7.20% of those age 65 or over.

== Politics ==
United States presidential election results for Phillips County, Colorado
Year	Republican		Democratic		Third party(ies)	
Year	No.	%	No.	%	No.	%
1892	266	49.17%	0	0.00%	275	50.83%
1896	196	36.84%	334	62.78%	2	0.38%
1900	347	53.72%	275	42.57%	24	3.72%
1904	444	68.20%	140	21.51%	67	10.29%
1908	508	54.33%	401	42.89%	26	2.78%
1912	266	22.37%	448	37.68%	475	39.95%
1916	532	38.16%	795	57.03%	67	4.81%
1920	1,191	66.80%	480	26.92%	112	6.28%
1924	1,076	49.61%	397	18.30%	696	32.09%
1928	1,440	65.16%	705	31.90%	65	2.94%
1932	903	34.84%	1,453	56.06%	236	9.10%
1936	941	36.15%	1,602	61.54%	60	2.31%
1940	1,168	54.30%	919	42.72%	64	2.98%
1944	1,455	65.16%	761	34.08%	17	0.76%
1948	1,076	52.51%	932	45.49%	41	2.00%
1952	1,670	67.72%	789	32.00%	7	0.28%
1956	1,535	63.35%	887	36.61%	1	0.04%
1960	1,455	62.77%	862	37.19%	1	0.04%
1964	1,012	44.78%	1,243	55.00%	5	0.22%
1968	1,237	56.87%	723	33.24%	215	9.89%
1972	1,480	65.31%	687	30.32%	99	4.37%
1976	1,142	48.12%	1,173	49.43%	58	2.44%
1980	1,488	63.21%	640	27.19%	226	9.60%
1984	1,689	71.36%	651	27.50%	27	1.14%
1988	1,317	57.81%	923	40.52%	38	1.67%
1992	1,075	46.68%	692	30.05%	536	23.27%
1996	1,284	58.76%	706	32.31%	195	8.92%
2000	1,573	70.86%	564	25.41%	83	3.74%
2004	1,717	73.85%	582	25.03%	26	1.12%
2008	1,613	71.34%	622	27.51%	26	1.15%
2012	1,637	72.27%	588	25.96%	40	1.77%
2016	1,791	76.80%	436	18.70%	105	4.50%
2020	1,958	78.79%	486	19.56%	41	1.65%
2024	1,888	80.17%	412	17.49%	55	2.34%

United States Senate election results for Phillips County, Colorado2
Year	Republican		Democratic		Third party(ies)	
Year	No.	%	No.	%	No.	%
2020	1,980	80.13%	463	18.74%	28	1.13%

United States Senate election results for Phillips County, Colorado3
Year	Republican		Democratic		Third party(ies)	
Year	No.	%	No.	%	No.	%
2022	1,503	75.87%	400	20.19%	78	3.94%

Colorado Gubernatorial election results for Phillips County
Year	Republican		Democratic		Third party(ies)	
Year	No.	%	No.	%	No.	%
2022	1,519	77.15%	384	19.50%	66	3.35%

Phillips County has historically had a Republican majority. It has not been carried by a Democratic presidential nominee since Jimmy Carter in 1976. Michael Dukakis has been the only Democrat since to receive over one-third of the county's ballots during a major drought in 1988.

== Communities ==
=== City ===
- Holyoke

=== Towns ===
- Haxtun
- Paoli

=== Census-designated place ===
- Amherst

== See also ==
- Bibliography of Colorado
- Geography of Colorado
- History of Colorado
  - National Register of Historic Places listings in Phillips County, Colorado
- Index of Colorado-related articles
- List of Colorado-related lists
  - List of counties in Colorado
- Outline of Colorado
