= Crowley County, Colorado =

County in Colorado, United States

- County
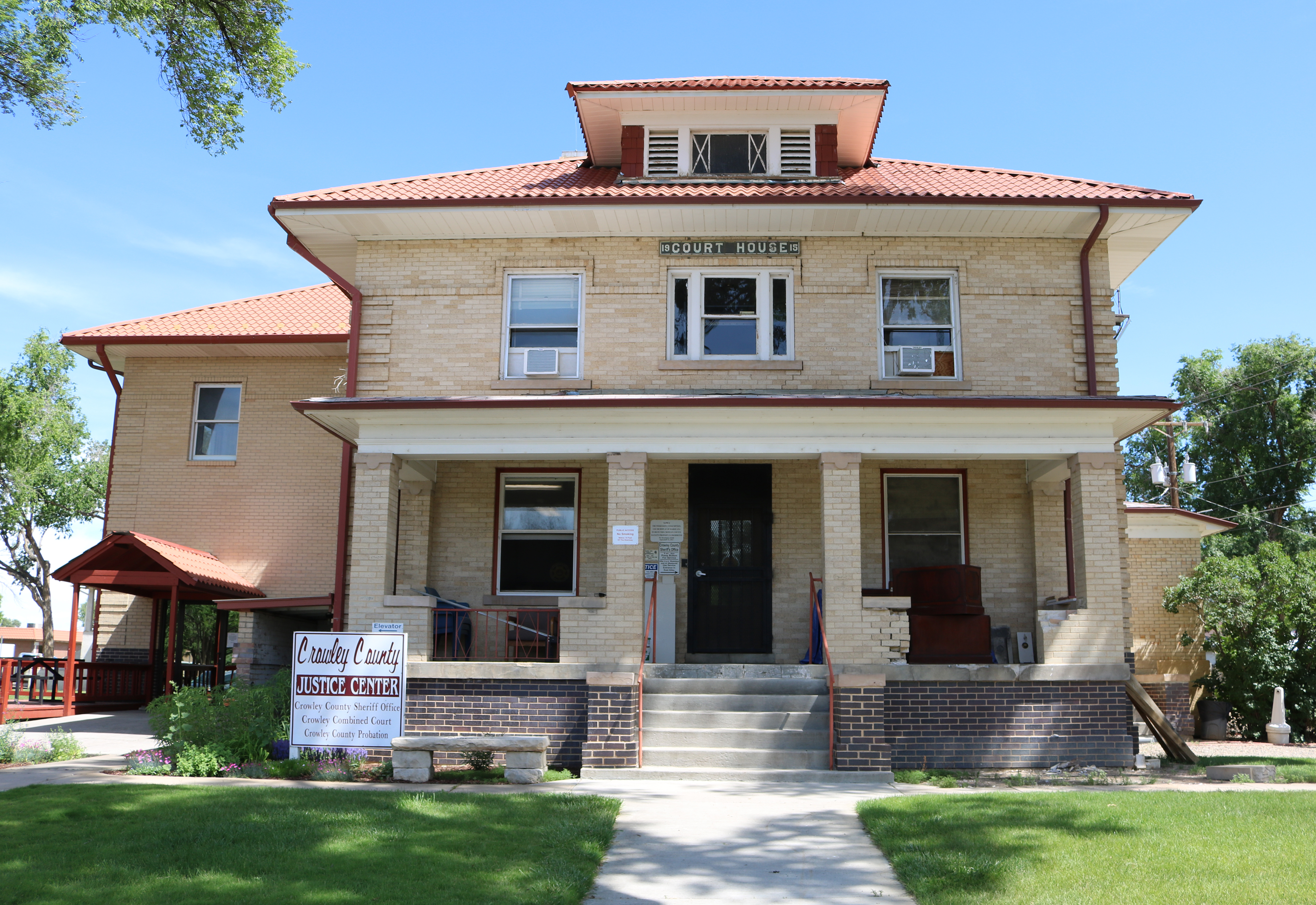
- The Crowley County Justice Center in Ordway.

- Location within the U.S. state of Colorado
- Coordinates: 38.33°N 103.79°W
- Country: United States
- State: Colorado
- Founded: May 29, 1911
- Named for: John H. Crowley
- Seat: Ordway
- Largest town: Ordway

Area
  - Total: 800 sq mi (2,100 km^{2})
  - Land: 787 sq mi (2,040 km^{2})
  - Water: 13 sq mi (34 km^{2}) 1.6%

Population (2020)
  - Total: 5,922
  - Estimate (2025): 5,677 ▼
  - Density: 7.52/sq mi (2.91/km^{2})
- Time zone: UTC−7 (Mountain)
  - Summer (DST): UTC−6 (MDT)
- Congressional district: 4th
- Website: crowleycounty.colorado.gov

Crowley County is a county located in the U.S state of Colorado. As of the 2020 census, the population was 5,922. The county seat is Ordway.

== History ==
Crowley County was created by the Colorado legislature on May 29, 1911, out of the northern portions of Otero County. Previously both were parts of Bent County. The county was named for John H. Crowley, senator from Otero County to the state legislature at the time of the split. Its original inhabitants decades earlier were Native Americans, more Cheyenne than other tribes at the time the western expansion of the U.S. arrived.

The first significant development and settlement occurred in 1887 when the Missouri Pacific Railroad came through from the east, on its way to Pueblo and Colorado's rich gold fields of "Pikes Peak Or Bust".

The county seat is in Ordway, a town established in 1890 that quickly became the economic hub of the area. Other towns still existing along the Missouri Pacific Railroad's route are Sugar City, Crowley, and Olney Springs.

A few years later, developers brought a canal east from the Arkansas River, with ambitious plans to irrigate a million acres (4000 km^{2}) in Kansas; instead, the canal petered out in Crowley County but did irrigate 57,000 acres (230 km^{2}) along its length. This turned early Crowley County into a lush agricultural mecca at first.

By the 1970s almost all the water rights were sold from what is now called the Twin Lakes Canal to the fast-growing cities of Colorado's Front Range corridor. The area's economic activity has shifted toward ranching. Much of the land has returned to its original sparse prairie grassland conditions.

The Crowley School, which is now the Crowley County Heritage Center, is the county's only historic site listed on the U.S. National Register of Historic Places.

Crowley County also today hosts two prisons: the Arkansas Valley Correctional Facility in Ordway, and the Crowley County Correctional Facility in Olney Springs. The 2000 census showed 5,518 county residents, of which 1,955 were prisoners, giving Crowley County the highest percentage of incarcerated prisoners of any county in the U.S. The county maintained this position in the 2010 census, with 2,682 prisoners out of 5,823 residents.

== Geography ==
According to the U.S. Census Bureau, the county has a total area of 800 square miles (2,100 km^{2}), of which 787 square miles (2,040 km^{2}) is land and 13 square miles (34 km^{2}) (1.6%) is water. Lake Meredith, which lies south of Ordway and Sugar City, is the largest of several lakes in the county.

=== Adjacent counties ===
- Lincoln County - north
- El Paso County - northwest
- Otero County - south
- Kiowa County - east
- Pueblo County - west

=== Major highways ===
- State Highway 71
- State Highway 96
- State Highway 167
- State Highway 207

=== Bicycle trail ===
- TransAmerica Trail Bicycle Route

== Demographics ==
Historical population
Census	Pop.	Note	%±
1920	6,383		—
1930	5,934		−7.0%
1940	5,398		−9.0%
1950	5,222		−3.3%
1960	3,978		−23.8%
1970	3,086		−22.4%
1980	2,988		−3.2%
1990	3,946		32.1%
2000	5,518		39.8%
2010	5,823		5.5%
2020	5,922		1.7%
2025 (est.)	5,677	▼	−4.1%
U.S. Decennial Census; 1790-1960 1900-1990; 1990-2000 2010-2020

=== 2020 census ===
As of the 2020 census, the county had a population of 5,922. Of the residents, 10.8% were under the age of 18 and 15.0% were 65 years of age or older; the median age was 41.8 years. For every 100 females there were 287.6 males, and for every 100 females age 18 and over there were 337.1 males. 0.0% of residents lived in urban areas and 100.0% lived in rural areas. The population density was 7.4 people per square mile (2.9/km2).

Crowley County, Colorado – Racial and ethnic composition Note: the US Census treats Hispanic/Latino as an ethnic category. This table excludes Latinos from the racial categories and assigns them to a separate category. Hispanics/Latinos may be of any race.
Race / Ethnicity (NH = Non-Hispanic)	Pop 2000	Pop 2010	Pop 2020	% 2000	% 2010	% 2020
White alone (NH)	3,671	3,369	3,438	66.53%	57.86%	58.05%
Black or African American alone (NH)	386	555	510	7.00%	9.53%	8.61%
Native American or Alaska Native alone (NH)	107	91	151	1.94%	1.56%	2.55%
Asian alone (NH)	45	59	69	0.82%	1.01%	1.17%
Pacific Islander alone (NH)	1	0	2	0.02%	0.00%	0.03%
Other race alone (NH)	6	4	5	0.11%	0.07%	0.08%
Mixed race or Multiracial (NH)	58	59	139	1.05%	1.01%	2.35%
Hispanic or Latino (any race)	1,244	1,686	1,608	22.54%	28.95%	27.15%
Total	5,518	5,823	5,922	100.00%	100.00%	100.00%

The racial makeup of the county was 63.3% White, 8.7% Black or African American, 3.0% American Indian and Alaska Native, 1.2% Asian, 0.0% Native Hawaiian and Pacific Islander, 17.3% from some other race, and 6.4% from two or more races. Hispanic or Latino residents of any race comprised 27.2% of the population.

There were 1,317 households in the county, of which 25.2% had children under the age of 18 living with them and 25.8% had a female householder with no spouse or partner present. About 34.1% of all households were made up of individuals and 16.0% had someone living alone who was 65 years of age or older.

There were 1,509 housing units, of which 12.7% were vacant. Among occupied housing units, 73.1% were owner-occupied and 26.9% were renter-occupied. The homeowner vacancy rate was 2.7% and the rental vacancy rate was 8.9%.

=== 2000 census ===
There were 1,358 households, out of which 34.50% had children under the age of 18 living with them, 55.10% were married couples living together, 11.00% had a female householder with no husband present, and 29.50% were non-families. 25.70% of all households were made up of individuals, and 13.00% had someone living alone who was 65 years of age or older. The average household size was 2.59 and the average family size was 3.12.

In the county, the population was spread out, with 18.80% under the age of 18, 9.90% from 18 to 24, 39.60% from 25 to 44, 20.80% from 45 to 64, and 10.80% who were 65 years of age or older. The median age was 37 years. For every 100 females there were 205.40 males (this is the highest of any U.S. county/parish in 2000). For every 100 females age 18 and over, there were 240.90 males.

The median income for a household in the county was $26,803, and the median income for a family was $32,162. Males had a median income of $20,813 versus $21,920 for females. The per capita income for the county was $12,836. About 15.20% of families and 18.50% of the population were below the poverty line, including 23.60% of those under age 18 and 13.50% of those age 65 or over.

=== Poverty estimates ===
More recent data, published in 2011, estimated that 48.1 percent of the county's residents lived in poverty, and of 3,197 counties ranked by the U.S. Census Bureau in 2011 for "estimated percent of people of all ages in poverty", Crowley was second, due to the prison located in the county.

=== Prison population ===
Census data for Crowley County includes 1,955 prisoners. The prison population is 19.23% Black, and 24.35% Hispanic. Without the prisoners, Crowley County would be 86.72% White, 0.36% Black, and 21.55% Hispanic. As a percentage of its population, Crowley County has more of its Census population in prison than any other county in the country.

== Politics ==
Crowley is a predominantly Republican county. No Democratic presidential nominee has won Crowley County since Lyndon Johnson's 1964 landslide. Before that time, the county largely followed the patterns of Colorado politics in general, from strongly Democratic during the William Jennings Bryan and Woodrow Wilson eras to Republican leaning from the time of Wendell Willkie onwards.

United States presidential election results for Crowley County, Colorado
Year	Republican		Democratic		Third party(ies)	
Year	No.	%	No.	%	No.	%
1912	467	28.35%	719	43.66%	461	27.99%
1916	847	40.47%	1,160	55.42%	86	4.11%
1920	1,348	60.64%	792	35.63%	83	3.73%
1924	1,087	50.23%	667	30.82%	410	18.95%
1928	1,243	65.42%	635	33.42%	22	1.16%
1932	811	38.31%	1,266	59.80%	40	1.89%
1936	920	43.11%	1,163	54.50%	51	2.39%
1940	1,419	62.21%	850	37.26%	12	0.53%
1944	1,214	62.93%	710	36.81%	5	0.26%
1948	1,027	50.34%	1,004	49.22%	9	0.44%
1952	1,546	67.78%	726	31.83%	9	0.39%
1956	1,220	62.05%	745	37.89%	1	0.05%
1960	1,099	60.89%	705	39.06%	1	0.06%
1964	690	41.49%	967	58.15%	6	0.36%
1968	775	50.36%	565	36.71%	199	12.93%
1972	1,094	70.67%	414	26.74%	40	2.58%
1976	834	54.90%	667	43.91%	18	1.18%
1980	926	62.86%	472	32.04%	75	5.09%
1984	993	65.03%	517	33.86%	17	1.11%
1988	862	57.47%	630	42.00%	8	0.53%
1992	602	41.29%	570	39.09%	286	19.62%
1996	680	49.60%	559	40.77%	132	9.63%
2000	855	59.17%	511	35.36%	79	5.47%
2004	1,006	67.38%	478	32.02%	9	0.60%
2008	976	62.64%	552	35.43%	30	1.93%
2012	924	61.52%	535	35.62%	43	2.86%
2016	1,079	70.66%	339	22.20%	109	7.14%
2020	1,271	72.63%	437	24.97%	42	2.40%
2024	1,231	72.16%	422	24.74%	53	3.11%

United States Senate election results for Crowley County, Colorado2
Year	Republican		Democratic		Third party(ies)	
Year	No.	%	No.	%	No.	%
2020	1,230	70.65%	456	26.19%	55	3.16%

United States Senate election results for Crowley County, Colorado3
Year	Republican		Democratic		Third party(ies)	
Year	No.	%	No.	%	No.	%
2022	849	61.75%	432	31.42%	94	6.84%

Colorado Gubernatorial election results for Crowley County
Year	Republican		Democratic		Third party(ies)	
Year	No.	%	No.	%	No.	%
2022	861	62.48%	405	29.39%	112	8.13%

== Communities ==
=== Towns ===
- Crowley
- Olney Springs
- Ordway
- Sugar City

== See also ==
- Bibliography of Colorado
- Geography of Colorado
- History of Colorado
  - National Register of Historic Places listings in Crowley County, Colorado
- Index of Colorado-related articles
- List of Colorado-related lists
  - List of counties in Colorado
- Outline of Colorado
