= Sugar City, Colorado =

Town in Colorado, United States

- Town
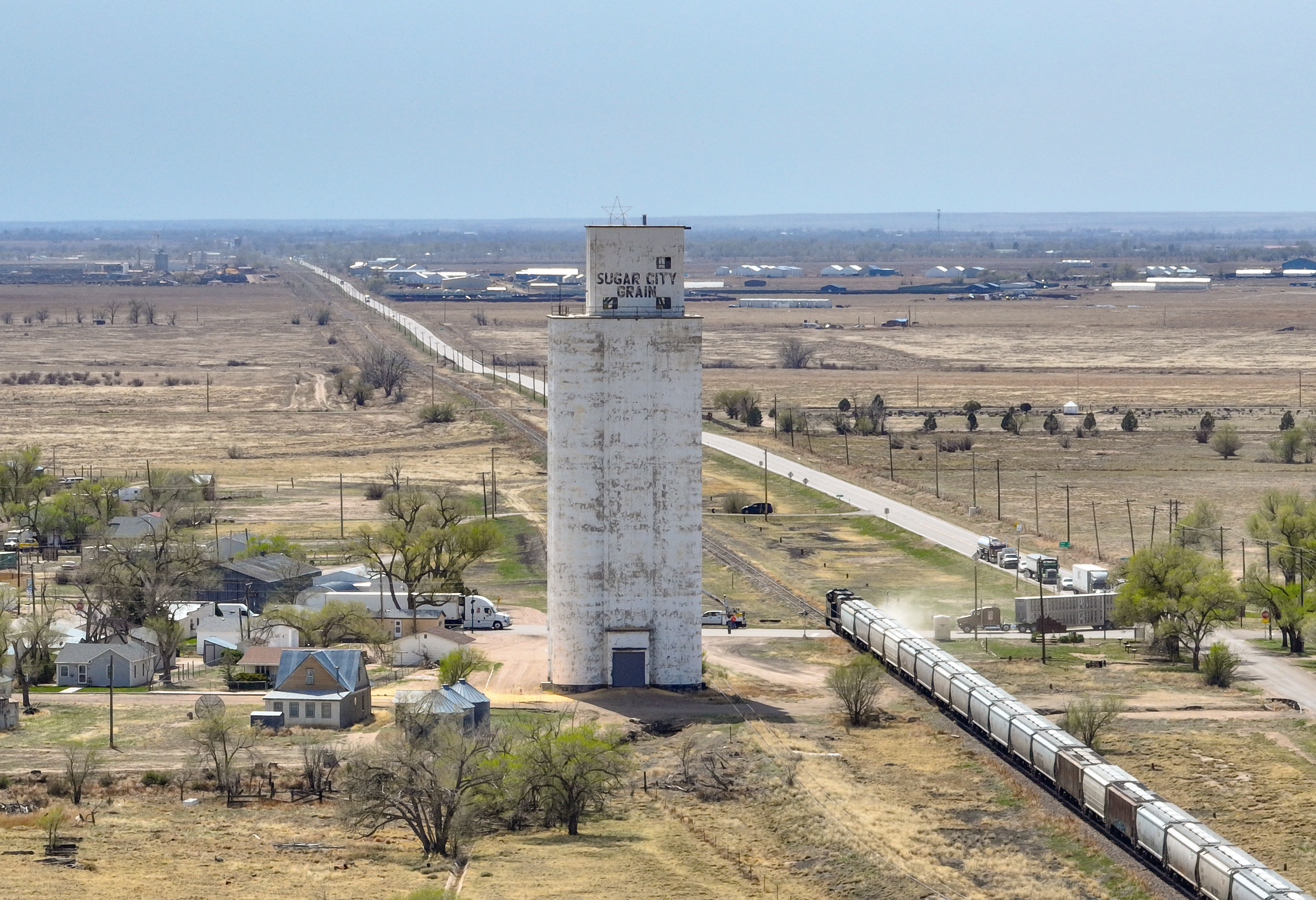
- Grain elevator (2023)

- Location within Crowley County and Colorado
- Coordinates: 38°13′55″N 103°39′53″W
- Country: United States
- State: Colorado
- County: Crowley
- Incorporated: July 2, 1900

Area
  - Total: 0.39 sq mi (1.00 km^{2})
  - Land: 0.39 sq mi (1.00 km^{2})
  - Water: 0 sq mi (0.00 km^{2})
- Elevation: 4,305 ft (1,312 m)

Population (2020)
  - Total: 259
  - Density: 671/sq mi (259/km^{2})
- Time zone: UTC−7 (MST)
  - Summer (DST): UTC−6 (MDT)
- ZIP Code: 81076
- Area code: 719
- FIPS code: 08-74815
- GNIS ID: 195392
- Website: Town of Sugar City

Sugar City is a statutory town in Crowley County, Colorado, United States. The population was 259 at the 2020 census.

== History ==
A post office called Sugar City has been in operation since 1900. The community was named for the fact it once was a sugar manufacturing center.

Sugar City was named for its sugar beet factory, established in 1899. It was owned by the National Beet Sugar Company. During a drought in the 1950s the wastewater lagoons at the factory dried, producing a smell that overwhelmed the town. The factory closed in 1967.

== Geography ==
Sugar City is located in southeastern Crowley County. Colorado State Highway 96 leads west 5 miles (8 km) to Ordway, the county seat, and northeast 33 miles (53 km) to Haswell.

According to the United States Census Bureau, Sugar City has a total area of 0.4 square miles (1.0 km^{2}), all of it land.

== Demographics ==
Historical population
Census	Pop.	Note	%±
1900	689		—
1910	808		17.3%
1920	836		3.5%
1930	598		−28.5%
1940	565		−5.5%
1950	527		−6.7%
1960	409		−22.4%
1970	307		−24.9%
1980	306		−0.3%
1990	252		−17.6%
2000	279		10.7%
2010	258		−7.5%
2020	259		0.4%
U.S. Decennial Census

== See also ==
- Colorado cities and towns
