= 1992 United States presidential election in Colorado =

- November 3, 1992

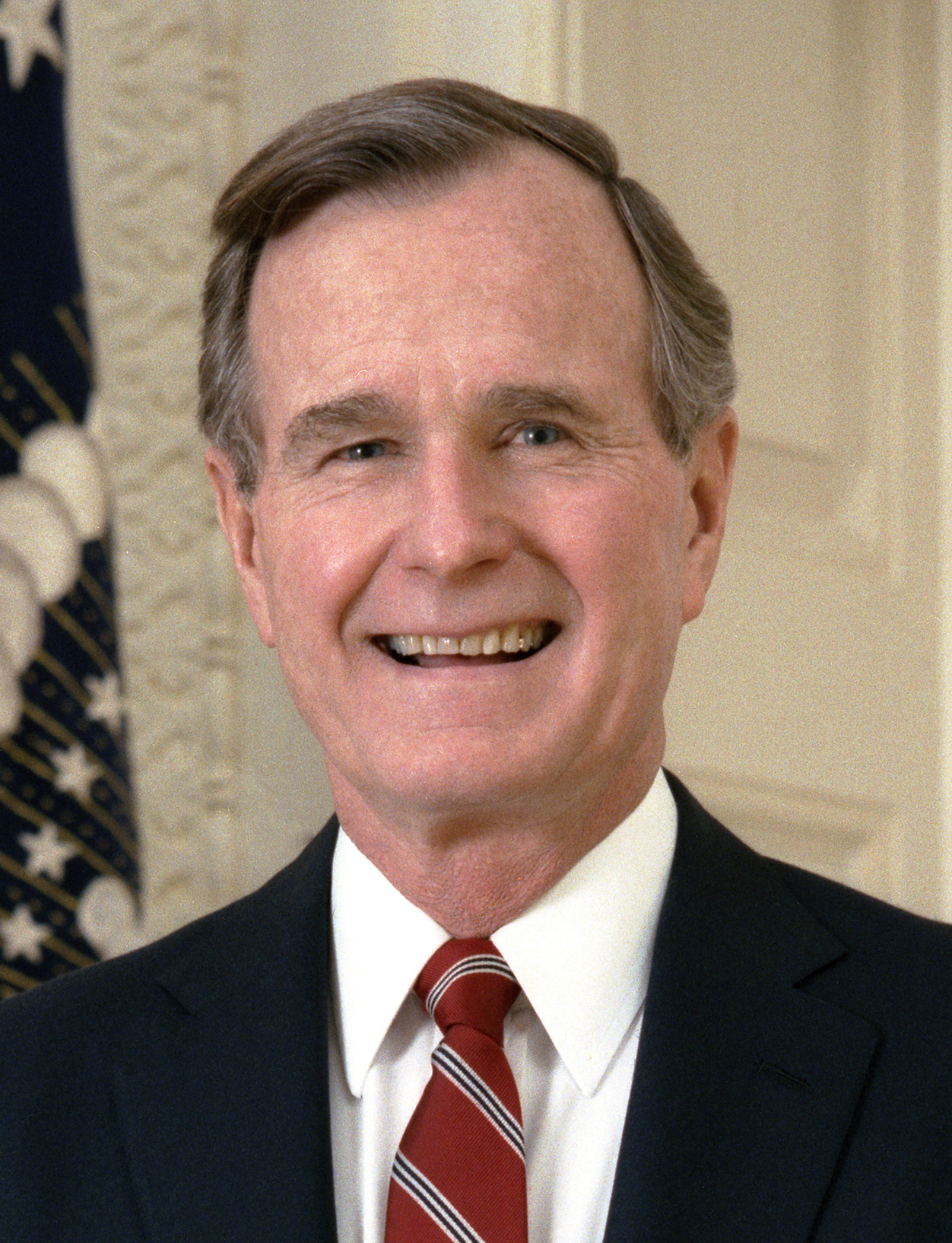

Nominee	Bill Clinton	George H. W. Bush	Ross Perot
Party	Democratic	Republican	Independent
Home state	Arkansas	Texas	Texas
Running mate	Al Gore	Dan Quayle	James Stockdale
Electoral vote	8	0	0
Popular vote	629,681	562,850	366,010
Percentage	40.13%	35.87%	23.32%
County results
Clinton
30–40%
40–50%
50–60%
60–70%
Bush
30–40%
40–50%
50–60%
Perot
30–40%
40–50%
President before election
George H. W. Bush
Republican
Elected President
Bill Clinton
Democratic

The 1992 United States presidential election in Colorado took place on November 3, 1992, as part of the 1992 United States presidential election. Voters chose eight representatives, or electors to the Electoral College, who voted for president and vice president.

Colorado was won by the Democratic nominees, Governor Bill Clinton of Arkansas and his running mate Senator Al Gore of Tennessee. Clinton and Gore defeated the Republican nominees, incumbent President George H. W. Bush of Texas and Vice President Dan Quayle of Indiana. Independent businessman Ross Perot of Texas, and his running mate Navy Vice Admiral James Stockdale, finished in a relatively strong third in the state.

Clinton received 40.13% of the vote to Bush's 35.87%, a Democratic victory margin of 4.26 points. Ross Perot performed exceptionally well for a candidate outside the two major parties in the state, receiving 23.32% of the vote in Colorado, exceeding his nationwide 18.91% vote share. Perot bested Clinton or Bush for second place in 19 out of Colorado's 64 Counties and also won pluralities of the vote in Moffat County and San Juan County, the state providing Perot two county victories out of only fifteen county equivalents which Perot won nationwide.

Clinton ultimately won the national vote, defeating incumbent President Bush. Clinton's victory marked the first time since the nationwide Democratic landslide of 1964, and the last time until 2008, that Colorado had voted Democratic, as well as the first time since 1932 in which a non-incumbent Democrat would carry the state, along with an incumbent Republican president losing it. Clinton won Clear Creek, Eagle, Gunnison, Routt, and Summit Counties for the Democrats for the first time since 1964; they have all gone on to vote Democratic in every subsequent election as of 2024, save in 2000, when many of them gave plurality wins to George W. Bush (in what was also the last election, as of 2024, that Colorado has voted Republican by more than 5%). Clinton also won the city of Denver by more than 30%, a larger margin than any nominee had won it by since 1964, and won Boulder County, a then-traditionally Republican county that Dukakis had won by 8.5%, by 24.3%.

These improvements would eventually lay the groundwork for Colorado's increasingly competitive status from 2004 on, and increasingly established status as a safe blue state from 2020 on. For the time being, however, Colorado remained a lean-red state, with George H. W. Bush retaining the large Denver suburban counties of Jefferson and Arapahoe, albeit narrowly. In 1996, Dole would improve on George H. W. Bush's margins in these two counties, and would also take back Larimer County, helping him narrowly carry the state despite losing nationally by 8.5%.

As of the 2024 presidential election, this is the last election in which Moffat County did not support the Republican candidate and the only election since 1944 in which Colorado did not support the same candidate as Virginia.

== Results ==
1992 United States presidential election in Colorado
Party	Candidate	Votes	Percentage	Electoral votes
Democratic	Bill Clinton	629,681	40.13%	8
Republican	George H. W. Bush (incumbent)	562,850	35.87%	0
Independent	Ross Perot	366,010	23.32%	0
Libertarian	Andre Marrou	8,669	0.55%	0
New Alliance Party	Lenora Fulani	1,608	0.10%	0
America First	James "Bo" Gritz (write-in)	274	0.02%	0
Natural Law	Dr. John Hagelin (write-in)	47	>0.01%	0
Prohibition	Earl Dodge (write-in)	21	>0.01%	0
Democrats for Economic Recovery	Lyndon LaRouche (write-in)	20	>0.01%	0
Totals		1,569,180	100.0%	8

=== By county ===
County	Bill Clinton Democratic		George H.W. Bush Republican		Ross Perot Independent		Andre Marrou Libertarian		Various candidates Other parties		Margin		Total votes cast
County	#	%	#	%	#	%	#	%	#	%	#	%	Total votes cast
Adams	45,357	44.00%	30,856	29.93%	26,379	25.59%	385	0.37%	100	0.10%	14,501	14.07%	103,077
Alamosa	1,928	41.76%	1,572	34.05%	1,089	23.59%	16	0.35%	12	0.26%	356	7.71%	4,617
Arapahoe	66,607	36.21%	72,221	39.26%	44,363	24.12%	608	0.33%	136	0.07%	-5,614	-3.05%	183,935
Archuleta	819	29.08%	1,242	44.11%	741	26.31%	11	0.39%	3	0.11%	-423	-15.03%	2,816
Baca	726	27.69%	1,240	47.29%	647	24.68%	5	0.19%	4	0.15%	-514	-19.60%	2,622
Bent	985	43.64%	759	33.63%	506	22.42%	4	0.18%	3	0.13%	226	10.01%	2,257
Boulder	64,567	50.93%	33,553	26.47%	27,762	21.90%	735	0.58%	154	0.12%	31,014	24.46%	126,771
Chaffee	2,284	36.36%	2,419	38.51%	1,549	24.66%	22	0.35%	8	0.13%	-135	-2.15%	6,282
Cheyenne	301	24.83%	615	50.74%	292	24.09%	4	0.33%	0	0.00%	-314	-25.91%	1,212
Clear Creek	1,744	39.10%	1,356	30.40%	1,308	29.33%	44	0.99%	8	0.18%	388	8.70%	4,460
Conejos	1,705	49.21%	1,160	33.48%	578	16.68%	18	0.52%	4	0.12%	545	15.73%	3,465
Costilla	1,180	67.31%	366	20.88%	199	11.35%	3	0.17%	5	0.29%	814	46.43%	1,753
Crowley	570	39.09%	602	41.29%	276	18.93%	6	0.41%	4	0.27%	-32	-2.20%	1,458
Custer	343	24.95%	651	47.35%	368	26.76%	7	0.51%	6	0.44%	283 (Note: In this county where Clinton ran third behind Perot, percentage margin given is Bush percentage minus Perot percentage and vote margin Bush vote total minus Perot vote total.)	20.58%	1,375
Delta	3,424	32.63%	4,359	41.54%	2,627	25.03%	41	0.39%	43	0.41%	-935	-8.91%	10,494
Denver	121,961	56.13%	55,418	25.50%	37,298	17.17%	2,293	1.06%	319	0.15%	66,543	30.63%	217,289
Dolores	242	28.61%	315	37.23%	285	33.69%	3	0.35%	1	0.12%	30	3.54%	846
Douglas	9,991	24.94%	18,592	46.41%	11,329	28.28%	126	0.31%	22	0.05%	7,263	18.13%	40,060
Eagle	3,870	35.57%	3,100	28.49%	3,821	35.12%	61	0.56%	28	0.26%	49 (Note: In this county where Bush ran third behind Perot, percentage margin given is Clinton percentage minus Perot percentage and vote margin Clinton vote total minus Perot vote total.)	0.45%	10,880
El Paso	45,827	27.41%	86,044	51.47%	34,346	20.55%	797	0.48%	155	0.09%	-40,217	-24.06%	167,169
Elbert	1,237	24.52%	2,205	43.71%	1,567	31.06%	26	0.52%	10	0.20%	638	12.65%	5,045
Fremont	5,356	35.40%	5,961	39.40%	3,709	24.51%	76	0.50%	29	0.19%	-605	-4.00%	15,131
Garfield	5,082	36.36%	4,404	31.51%	4,408	31.54%	58	0.41%	24	0.17%	674	4.82%	13,976
Gilpin	726	41.27%	462	26.26%	545	30.98%	20	1.14%	6	0.34%	181	10.29%	1,759
Grand	1,678	34.12%	1,763	35.85%	1,454	29.56%	18	0.37%	5	0.10%	-85	-1.73%	4,918
Gunnison	2,389	41.48%	1,662	28.86%	1,671	29.02%	28	0.49%	9	0.16%	718	12.46%	5,759
Hinsdale	151	31.72%	188	39.50%	136	28.57%	1	0.21%	0	0.00%	-37	-7.78%	476
Huerfano	1,224	52.92%	685	29.62%	385	16.65%	14	0.61%	5	0.22%	539	23.30%	2,313
Jackson	216	22.36%	422	43.69%	326	33.75%	2	0.21%	0	0.00%	96	9.94%	966
Jefferson	80,834	36.22%	82,705	37.05%	58,404	26.17%	979	0.44%	281	0.13%	-1,871	-0.83%	223,203
Kiowa	290	28.16%	472	45.83%	267	25.92%	1	0.10%	0	0.00%	-182	-17.67%	1,030
Kit Carson	925	25.29%	1,801	49.23%	919	25.12%	11	0.30%	2	0.05%	-876	-23.94%	3,658
La Plata	5,913	37.87%	5,522	35.37%	4,083	26.15%	62	0.40%	33	0.21%	391	2.50%	15,613
Lake	1,426	48.79%	605	20.70%	863	29.52%	22	0.75%	7	0.24%	563	19.27%	2,923
Larimer	38,232	38.36%	35,995	36.12%	24,879	24.96%	418	0.42%	136	0.14%	2,237	2.24%	99,660
Las Animas	3,847	58.56%	1,739	26.47%	953	14.51%	25	0.38%	5	0.08%	2,108	32.09%	6,569
Lincoln	640	27.75%	1,079	46.79%	581	25.20%	6	0.26%	0	0.00%	-439	-19.04%	2,306
Logan	2,718	32.57%	3,420	40.98%	2,184	26.17%	20	0.24%	3	0.04%	-702	-8.41%	8,345
Mesa	15,162	34.41%	18,169	41.23%	10,474	23.77%	181	0.41%	81	0.18%	-3,007	-6.82%	44,067
Mineral	171	38.08%	159	35.41%	117	26.06%	1	0.22%	1	0.22%	12	2.67%	449
Moffat	1,386	27.20%	1,809	35.51%	1,875	36.80%	21	0.41%	4	0.08%	-66	-1.29%	5,095
Montezuma	2,270	29.72%	3,124	40.90%	2,205	28.87%	26	0.34%	13	0.17%	-854	-11.18%	7,638
Montrose	3,713	31.67%	4,847	41.35%	3,093	26.38%	41	0.35%	29	0.25%	-1,134	-9.68%	11,723
Morgan	2,985	33.43%	3,724	41.70%	2,175	24.36%	39	0.44%	7	0.08%	-739	-8.27%	8,930
Otero	3,485	41.92%	3,120	37.53%	1,590	19.13%	102	1.23%	16	0.19%	365	4.39%	8,313
Ouray	461	29.12%	653	41.25%	466	29.44%	3	0.19%	0	0.00%	187	11.81%	1,583
Park	1,307	30.57%	1,530	35.78%	1,396	32.65%	42	0.98%	1	0.02%	134	3.13%	4,276
Phillips	692	30.05%	1,075	46.68%	525	22.80%	10	0.43%	1	0.04%	-383	-16.63%	2,303
Pitkin	3,820	51.14%	1,686	22.57%	1,907	25.53%	43	0.58%	13	0.17%	1,913	25.61%	7,469
Prowers	1,770	32.92%	2,371	44.10%	1,184	22.02%	49	0.91%	3	0.06%	-601	-11.18%	5,377
Pueblo	30,261	53.62%	16,120	28.56%	9,841	17.44%	145	0.26%	71	0.13%	14,141	25.06%	56,438
Rio Blanco	778	27.30%	1,231	43.19%	794	27.86%	8	0.28%	39	1.37%	437	15.33%	2,850
Rio Grande	1,541	34.00%	1,927	42.51%	1,043	23.01%	11	0.24%	11	0.24%	-386	-8.51%	4,533
Routt	3,188	39.06%	2,358	28.89%	2,564	31.42%	44	0.54%	7	0.09%	624	7.64%	8,161
Saguache	1,011	46.50%	675	31.05%	471	21.67%	7	0.32%	10	0.46%	336	15.45%	2,174
San Juan	147	32.45%	118	26.05%	183	40.40%	3	0.66%	2	0.44%	-36	-7.95%	453
San Miguel	1,380	51.82%	628	23.58%	634	23.81%	15	0.56%	6	0.23%	746	28.01%	2,663
Sedgwick	397	34.64%	447	39.01%	295	25.74%	4	0.35%	3	0.26%	-50	-4.37%	1,146
Summit	3,344	39.95%	2,256	26.95%	2,715	32.44%	46	0.55%	9	0.11%	629	7.51%	8,370
Teller	1,873	27.09%	3,050	44.11%	1,927	27.87%	57	0.82%	7	0.10%	1,123	16.24%	6,914
Washington	660	25.26%	1,266	48.45%	671	25.68%	14	0.54%	2	0.08%	595	22.77%	2,613
Weld	19,295	35.71%	20,958	38.79%	13,571	25.12%	140	0.26%	65	0.12%	-1,663	-3.08%	54,029
Yuma	1,269	28.17%	2,019	44.82%	1,197	26.57%	15	0.33%	5	0.11%	-750	-16.65%	4,505
Total	629,681	40.13%	562,850	35.87%	366,010	23.32%	8,669	0.55%	1,970	0.13%	66,831	4.26%	1,569,180

==== Counties that flipped from Republican to Democratic ====
- Alamosa
- Clear Creek
- Eagle
- Garfield
- Gunnison
- La Plata
- Larimer
- Mineral
- Otero
- Routt
- Summit

==== Counties that flipped from Republican to Independent ====
- Moffat
- San Juan
