= 2000 United States presidential election in Colorado =

- November 7, 2000

Nominee	George W. Bush	Al Gore	Ralph Nader
Party	Republican	Democratic	Green
Home state	Texas	Tennessee	Connecticut
Running mate	Dick Cheney	Joe Lieberman	Winona LaDuke
Electoral vote	8	0	0
Popular vote	883,745	738,227	91,434
Percentage	50.75%	42.39%	5.25%

Bush
40–50%
50–60%
60–70%
70–80%
Gore
40–50%
50–60%
60–70%
President before election
Bill Clinton
Democratic
Elected President
George W. Bush
Republican

The 2000 United States presidential election in Colorado took place on November 7, 2000, and was part of the 2000 United States presidential election. Voters chose eight representatives, or electors, to the Electoral College, who voted for president and vice president.

Colorado was won by Governor George W. Bush by an 8.36% margin of victory, although almost 7% of the electorate voted for third-party candidates. Nader's best performance in the state and indeed the nation was in San Miguel County, where he received over 17.20% of the vote, a performance that remains the Green Party's second best performance in any county nationwide as of the 2024 presidential election, after this record was bested in 2016 when Jill Stein carried 25% of the vote in Kalawao County, Hawaii.

As of 2024, this is the last election in which San Juan County, Gunnison County, Clear Creek County, Routt County, Eagle County, and La Plata County voted for a Republican presidential candidate. Bush became the first Republican to win the White House without carrying Summit County since William Howard Taft in 1908.

Colorado was 1 of 14 states that Bill Clinton carried at least once that Gore, the sitting VP under Clinton in 2000, lost to Bush.

== General election ==
=== Polling ===
Poll source	Date(s)	Sample size	Margin of error	George W. Bush (R)	Al Gore (D)	Ralph Nader (G)	Other / undecided (Note: Calculated by taking the difference of 100% and all other listed candidates combined. For polls that do not report a figure for Nader, this includes his support.)
Harris Insights & Analytics	November 3, 2000	3,697	—	48%	43%	6%	3%
Ciruli Associates	November 2, 2000	400	—	47%	38%	5%	10%
Ciruli Associates	October 29, 2000	400	—	46%	37%	4%	13%
Ciruli Associates	October 25, 2000	400	—	47%	37%	3%	13%
SurveyUSA	October 23, 2000	500	—	52%	39%	—	9%

=== Results ===
2000 United States presidential election in Colorado
Party	Candidate	Votes	Percentage	Electoral votes
Republican	George W. Bush	883,745	50.75%	8
Democratic	Al Gore	738,227	42.39%	0
Green	Ralph Nader	91,434	5.25%	0
Libertarian	Harry Browne	12,799	0.73%	0
American	Patrick Buchanan	10,465	0.60%	0
Natural Law	John Hagelin	2,240	0.13%	0
Constitution	Howard Phillips	1,319	0.08%	0
Socialist	David McReynolds	712	0.04%	0
Socialist Workers	James Harris	216	0.01%	0
Prohibition	Earl Dodge	208	0.01%	0
Totals		1,741,365	100.00%	8
Voter turnout (voting age)				54%

==== By county ====
County	George W. Bush Republican		Al Gore Democratic		Ralph Nader Green		Various candidates Other parties		Margin		Total votes cast
County	#	%	#	%	#	%	#	%	#	%	Total votes cast
Adams	47,561	44.10%	54,132	50.19%	4,165	3.86%	1,994	1.85%	-6,571	-6.09%	107,852
Alamosa	2,857	50.49%	2,455	43.38%	265	4.68%	82	1.44%	402	7.11%	5,659
Arapahoe	97,768	51.47%	82,614	43.49%	6,952	3.66%	2,608	1.38%	15,154	7.98%	189,942
Archuleta	2,988	62.80%	1,432	30.10%	265	5.57%	73	1.54%	1,556	32.70%	4,758
Baca	1,663	73.00%	531	23.31%	47	2.06%	37	1.62%	1,132	49.69%	2,278
Bent	1,096	55.83%	783	39.89%	44	2.24%	40	2.04%	313	15.94%	1,963
Boulder	50,873	36.44%	69,983	50.12%	16,498	11.82%	2,272	1.63%	-19,110	-13.68%	139,626
Chaffee	4,300	56.50%	2,768	36.37%	459	6.03%	83	1.09%	1,532	20.13%	7,610
Cheyenne	957	78.96%	209	17.24%	22	1.82%	24	1.98%	748	61.72%	1,212
Clear Creek	2,247	45.63%	2,188	44.44%	354	7.19%	135	2.73%	59	1.19%	4,924
Conejos	1,772	48.27%	1,749	47.64%	79	2.15%	71	1.93%	23	0.63%	3,671
Costilla	504	30.58%	1,054	63.96%	71	4.31%	19	1.15%	-550	-33.38%	1,648
Crowley	855	59.17%	511	35.36%	28	1.94%	51	3.54%	343	23.81%	1,445
Custer	1,451	68.74%	507	24.02%	100	4.74%	53	2.51%	944	44.72%	2,111
Delta	8,372	65.99%	3,264	25.73%	852	6.72%	198	1.56%	5,108	40.26%	12,686
Denver	61,224	30.87%	122,693	61.86%	11,624	5.86%	2,806	1.42%	-61,469	-30.99%	198,347
Dolores	741	65.34%	293	25.84%	73	6.44%	27	2.38%	448	39.50%	1,134
Douglas	56,007	64.95%	27,076	31.40%	2,230	2.59%	912	1.06%	28,931	33.55%	86,225
Eagle	7,165	47.18%	6,772	44.59%	1,045	6.88%	206	1.35%	393	2.59%	15,188
El Paso	128,294	63.91%	61,799	30.78%	7,116	3.54%	3,548	1.76%	66,495	33.13%	200,757
Elbert	6,151	68.61%	2,326	25.95%	292	3.26%	196	2.19%	3,825	42.66%	8,965
Fremont	9,914	61.75%	5,293	32.97%	516	3.21%	333	2.07%	4,621	28.78%	16,056
Garfield	9,103	53.22%	6,087	35.59%	1,608	9.40%	306	1.80%	3,016	17.63%	17,104
Gilpin	1,006	40.81%	1,099	44.58%	276	11.20%	84	3.40%	-93	-3.77%	2,465
Grand	3,570	56.19%	2,308	36.33%	366	5.76%	109	1.71%	1,262	19.86%	6,353
Gunnison	3,128	43.23%	3,059	42.27%	927	12.81%	122	1.69%	69	0.96%	7,236
Hinsdale	316	55.83%	188	33.22%	51	9.01%	11	1.94%	128	22.61%	566
Huerfano	1,466	46.19%	1,495	47.10%	169	5.32%	44	1.39%	-29	-0.91%	3,174
Jackson	682	73.73%	173	18.70%	40	4.32%	30	3.23%	509	55.03%	925
Jefferson	120,138	51.02%	100,970	42.88%	10,336	4.39%	4,047	1.71%	19,168	8.14%	235,491
Kiowa	728	75.21%	211	21.80%	13	1.34%	16	1.66%	517	53.41%	968
Kit Carson	2,542	73.51%	809	23.40%	58	1.68%	49	1.42%	1,733	50.11%	3,458
La Plata	9,993	48.77%	7,864	38.38%	2,378	11.61%	255	1.25%	2,129	10.39%	20,490
Lake	1,056	40.18%	1,296	49.32%	213	8.11%	63	2.40%	-240	-9.14%	2,628
Larimer	62,429	52.67%	46,055	38.85%	8,194	6.91%	1,859	1.56%	16,374	13.82%	118,537
Las Animas	2,569	42.16%	3,243	53.22%	199	3.27%	83	1.37%	-674	-11.06%	6,094
Lincoln	1,630	74.12%	510	23.19%	27	1.23%	32	1.45%	1,120	50.93%	2,199
Logan	5,531	68.32%	2,296	28.36%	140	1.73%	129	1.60%	3,235	39.96%	8,096
Mesa	32,396	63.45%	15,465	30.29%	2,235	4.38%	958	1.88%	16,931	33.16%	51,054
Mineral	294	60.49%	168	34.57%	19	3.91%	5	1.03%	126	25.92%	486
Moffat	3,840	71.95%	1,223	22.92%	169	3.17%	105	1.97%	2,617	49.03%	5,337
Montezuma	6,158	65.62%	2,556	27.24%	530	5.65%	140	1.50%	3,602	38.38%	9,384
Montrose	9,266	65.18%	4,041	28.43%	656	4.61%	252	1.78%	5,225	36.75%	14,215
Morgan	5,722	63.59%	2,885	32.06%	211	2.34%	180	1.99%	2,837	31.53%	8,998
Otero	4,082	55.83%	2,963	40.52%	138	1.89%	129	1.76%	1,119	15.31%	7,312
Ouray	1,279	57.28%	705	31.57%	224	10.03%	25	1.12%	574	25.71%	2,233
Park	3,677	55.17%	2,393	35.90%	404	6.06%	191	2.87%	1,284	19.27%	6,665
Phillips	1,573	70.86%	564	25.41%	48	2.16%	35	1.59%	1,009	45.45%	2,220
Pitkin	2,565	32.88%	4,137	53.04%	1,013	12.99%	85	1.09%	-1,572	-20.16%	7,800
Prowers	3,026	66.89%	1,361	30.08%	79	1.75%	58	1.28%	1,665	36.81%	4,524
Pueblo	22,827	42.31%	28,888	53.55%	1,520	2.82%	711	1.32%	-6,061	-11.24%	53,946
Rio Blanco	2,185	76.53%	543	19.02%	85	2.98%	42	1.47%	1,642	57.51%	2,855
Rio Grande	3,111	61.30%	1,707	33.64%	179	3.53%	78	1.53%	1,404	27.66%	5,075
Routt	4,472	46.40%	4,208	43.66%	820	8.51%	138	1.44%	264	2.74%	9,638
Saguache	1,078	42.63%	1,145	45.27%	261	10.32%	45	1.77%	-67	-2.64%	2,529
San Juan	210	48.17%	149	34.17%	58	13.30%	19	4.35%	61	14.00%	436
San Miguel	1,043	32.04%	1,598	49.09%	560	17.20%	54	1.67%	-555	-17.05%	3,255
Sedgwick	877	67.31%	384	29.47%	25	1.92%	17	1.30%	493	37.84%	1,303
Summit	4,497	40.63%	5,304	47.92%	1,131	10.22%	136	1.22%	-807	-7.29%	11,068
Teller	6,477	65.78%	2,750	27.93%	429	4.36%	191	1.93%	3,727	37.85%	9,847
Washington	1,878	76.81%	477	19.51%	50	2.04%	40	1.63%	1,401	57.30%	2,445
Weld	37,409	57.96%	23,436	36.31%	2,438	3.78%	1,258	1.94%	13,973	21.65%	64,541
Yuma	3,156	72.42%	1,082	24.83%	60	1.38%	60	1.38%	2,074	47.59%	4,358
Total	883,745	50.75%	738,227	42.39%	91,434	5.25%	27,959	1.61%	145,518	8.36%	1,741,365

===== Counties that flipped from Democratic to Republican =====
- Alamosa (largest city: Alamosa)
- Bent (largest city: Las Animas)
- Clear Creek (largest city: Idaho Springs)
- Conejos (largest city: Manassa)
- Eagle (largest city: Edwards)
- Gunnison (largest city: Gunnison)
- Mineral (largest city: Creede)
- Otero (largest city: La Junta)
- Routt (largest city: Steamboat Springs)

==== By congressional district ====
Bush won four of six congressional districts.

District	Bush	Gore	Representative
1st	32%	61%	Diana DeGette
2nd	42%	48%	Mark Udall
3rd	53%	39%	Scott McInnis
4th	56%	37%	Bob Schaffer
5th	63%	32%	Joel Hefley
6th	51%	44%	Tom Tancredo

== Electors ==
Technically the voters of Colorado cast their ballots for electors: representatives to the Electoral College. Colorado is allocated eight electors because it has six congressional districts and two senators. All candidates who appear on the ballot or qualify to receive write-in votes must submit a list of eight electors, who pledge to vote for their candidate and their running mate. Whoever wins the majority of votes in the state is awarded all eight electoral votes. Their chosen electors then vote for president and vice president. Although electors are pledged to their candidate and running mate, they are not obligated to vote for them. An elector who votes for someone other than their candidate is known as a faithless elector.

The electors of each state and the District of Columbia met on December 18, 2000 to cast their votes for president and vice president. The Electoral College itself never meets as one body. Instead, the electors from each state and the District of Columbia met in their respective capitols.

The following were the members of the Electoral College from the state. All were pledged to and voted for George W. Bush and Dick Cheney:

1. Bob Beauprez
2. Marcy Benson
3. Robert Dieter
4. Mary Hergert
5. Robert Martinez
6. Ralph Nagel
7. Lilly Nunez
8. Joe Rogers
