= 2024 Colorado elections =

The 2024 Colorado elections were held on Tuesday, November 5, 2024 and the primary election took place on June 25, 2024. In addition to the U.S. presidential race, Colorado voters voted in the U.S. House, Colorado State Board of Education, the University of Colorado Board of Regents, and other local elections.

== Federal elections ==
=== Presidential election ===
Democratic nominee Kamala Harris won ten electoral votes from Colorado by defeating Donald Trump comfortably.

=== House of Representatives ===
Prior to the regular elections in November, a special election was also called in the fourth district following the resignation of Ken Buck.

Republicans gained one seat, flipping the eighth district.

== State Board of Education ==
Four out of nine seats on the Colorado State Board of Education were up for election in 2024.

District	Party	Incumbent	Status	Party	Candidate	Votes	%
2	Democratic	Angelika Schroeder	term-limited	Democratic	Kathy Gebhardt	299,267	99.33%
2	Democratic	Angelika Schroeder	term-limited	Libertarian	Ethan Augreen (write-in)	2,004	0.67%
3 (special)	Republican	Sherri Wright	running (Note: Appointed on October 28, 2024.)	Republican	Sherri Wright	217,850	56.96%
3 (special)	Republican	Sherri Wright	running	Democratic	Ellen Angeles	164,625	43.04%
4	Republican	Debora Scheffel	not running	Republican	Kristi Burton Brown	263,234	60.54%
4	Republican	Debora Scheffel	not running	Democratic	Krista Holtzmann	171,565	39.46%
8	Democratic	Rhonda Solis	running	Republican	Yazmin Navarro	168,810	52.49%
8	Democratic	Rhonda Solis	running	Democratic	Rhonda Solis	152,772	47.51%

Source: Colorado Secretary of State

== CU Board of Regents ==
Three out of nine seats on the University of Colorado Board of Regents were up for election in 2024.

District	Party	Incumbent	Status	Party	Candidate	Votes	%
At-large	Democratic	Lesley Smith	not running	Democratic	Elliott Hood	1,478,661	50.45%
At-large	Democratic	Lesley Smith	not running	Republican	Eric Rinard	1,363,271	46.52%
At-large	Democratic	Lesley Smith	not running	Unity	T.J. Cole	59,612	2.03%
At-large	Democratic	Lesley Smith	not running	Approval Voting	Thomas Reasoner	29,232	1.00%
3	Republican	Glen Gallegos	term-limited	Republican	Ray Scott	213,916	57.10%
3	Republican	Glen Gallegos	term-limited	Democratic	Robert Logan	160,726	42.90%
5	Republican	Ken Montera	running (Note: Appointed on December 20, 2021.)	Republican	Ken Montera	203,772	58.84%
5	Republican	Ken Montera	running	Democratic	Axel Brown	142,538	41.16%

Source: Colorado Secretary of State

== State judiciary ==
=== Supreme Court ===
Three justices on the Colorado Supreme Court faced retention in 2024.

==== Chief Justice Márquez retention ====
Results by county For: 50–60%; 60–70%; 70–80%; Against: 50–60%; 60–70%

Monica Márquez was appointed by Governor Bill Ritter in 2010 as an associate justice to succeed Mary Mullarkey. She became chief justice in July 2024.

Colorado Supreme Court Chief Justice Márquez retention election
Choice	Votes	%
For	1,613,684	64.06
Against	905,209	35.94
Total	2,518,893	100.00
Source: Colorado Secretary of State

==== Justice Berkenkotter retention ====
Results by county For: 50–60%; 60–70%; 70–80%; 80–90%; Against: 50–60%

Maria Berkenkotter was appointed by Governor Jared Polis in 2020 to succeed Nathan Coats.

Colorado Supreme Court Associate Justice Berkenkotter retention election
Choice	Votes	%
For	1,685,363	66.80
Against	837,630	33.20
Total	2,522,993	100.00
Source: Colorado Secretary of State

==== Justice Boatright retention ====
Results by county For: 50–60%; 60–70%; 70–80%; Against: 50–60%

Brian Boatright was appointed by Governor John Hickenlooper in 2011 to succeed Alex Martinez.

Colorado Supreme Court Associate Justice Boatright retention election
Choice	Votes	%
For	1,571,597	62.82
Against	930,272	37.18
Total	2,501,869	100.00
Source: Colorado Secretary of State

=== Court of Appeals ===
The terms of six judges on the Colorado Court of Appeals expired in 2024; five of them chose to run for another term.

Justice Anthony Navarro chose not to run for retention; as a result Polis appointed Melissa Meirink to his seat.

==== Chief Judge Román retention ====
Results by county For: 50–60%; 60–70%; 70–80%; 80–90%; Against: 50–60%

Gilbert Román was first appointed by Governor Bill Owens in 2005 to succeed Henry Nieto. He became chief judge in 2021.

Colorado Court of Appeals Chief Judge Román retention election
Choice	Votes	%
For	1,624,623	67.35
Against	787,676	32.65
Total	2,412,299	100.00
Source: Colorado Secretary of State

==== Judge Schutz retention ====
Results by county For: 50–60%; 60–70%; 70–80%; 80–90%; Against: 50–60%; 60–70%

Timothy Schutz was appointed by Governor Polis in 2021 to succeed Steve Bernard.

Colorado Court of Appeals Judge Schutz retention election
Choice	Votes	%
For	1,558,761	64.82
Against	846,107	35.18
Total	2,404,868	100.00
Source: Colorado Secretary of State

==== Judge Dunn retention ====
Results by county For: 50–60%; 60–70%; 70–80%; 80–90%; Against: 50–60%; 60–70%

Stephanie Dunn was appointed by Governor Hickenlooper in 2012 to succeed Arthur Roy.

Colorado Court of Appeals Judge Dunn retention election
Choice	Votes	%
For	1,674,266	68.60
Against	766,207	31.40
Total	2,440,473	100.00
Source: Colorado Secretary of State

==== Judge Jones retention ====
Results by county For: 50–60%; 60–70%; 70–80%; Against: 50–60%

Jerry Jones was appointed by Governor Owens along with two more judges following the expansion of the Colorado Court of Appeals in 2006.

Colorado Court of Appeals Judge Jones retention election
Choice	Votes	%
For	1,460,408	60.43
Against	956,221	39.57
Total	2,416,629	100.00
Source: Colorado Secretary of State

==== Judge Kuhn retention ====
Results by county For: 50–60%; 60–70%; 70–80%; 80–90%; Against: 50–60%; 60–70%

Eric Kuhn was appointed by Governor Polis in 2021 to succeed Diana Terry.

Colorado Court of Appeals Judge Kuhn retention election
Choice	Votes	%
For	1,622,478	67.10
Against	795,393	32.90
Total	2,417,871	100.00
Source: Colorado Secretary of State

== General Assembly ==
18 out of 35 seats in the Colorado Senate and all 65 seats in the Colorado House of Representatives were up for election.

== Ballot measures ==
Fourteen statewide measures in total were on the ballot in Colorado.

2024 Colorado ballot measures
Name	Description	Votes				Type
Name	Description	Yes	%	No	%	Type
Amendment 79	Establishes the right to abortion and repeals a constitutional ban on public funding for abortions.	1,921,593	61.97	1,179,261	38.03	Citizen-initiated constitutional amendment
Amendment 80	Provides that "each K-12 child has the right to school choice."	1,507,236	49.32	1,548,679	50.68	Citizen-initiated constitutional amendment
Amendment G	Expands the property tax exemption for veterans with a disability to veterans with individual unemployability status.	2,212,022	73.13	812,638	26.87	Legislatively referred constitutional amendment
Amendment H	Creates an independent judicial discipline adjudicative board and create rules for the judicial discipline process.	2,150,820	73.05	793,642	26.95	Legislatively referred constitutional amendment
Amendment I	Removes the right to bail in cases of first-degree murder when the proof is evident or the presumption is great.	2,058,063	68.34	953,652	31.66	Legislatively referred constitutional amendment
Amendment J	Repeals Amendment 43 (2006) and the state's constitutional ban against same-sex marriage.	1,982,200	64.33	1,099,288	35.67	Legislatively referred constitutional amendment
Amendment K	Shortens the collection period by one week for the secretary of state to certify ballot order and content and election officials' deadline to transmit ballots.	1,293,879	44.85	1,591,312	55.15	Legislatively referred constitutional amendment
Proposition 127	Prohibits the hunting of mountain lions, bobcats, and lynxes.	1,382,048	45.26	1,671,710	54.74	Citizen-initiated state statute
Proposition 128	Requires that persons convicted of certain violent crimes serve more of their sentences before being eligible for parole.	1,869,231	62.11	1,140,284	37.89	Citizen-initiated state statute
Proposition 129	Creates the profession of veterinary professional associate (VPA), requiring a master's degree and registration with the state board of veterinary medicine.	1,572,545	52.76	1,407,814	47.24	Citizen-initiated state statute
Proposition 130	Allocates state revenue to a new fund, called the Peace Officer Training and Support Fund, for law enforcement recruitment, retention, training, and death benefits.	1,583,118	52.79	1,415,528	47.21	Citizen-initiated state statute
Proposition 131	Establishes top-four primaries and ranked-choice voting for federal and state offices.	1,385,060	46.47	1,595,256	53.53	Citizen-initiated state statute
Proposition JJ	Allows the state to retain tax revenue collected above $29 million annually from the tax on sports betting proceeds.	2,340,370	76.44	721,237	23.56	Legislatively referred state statute
Proposition KK	Levies a 6.5% excise tax on the manufacture and sale of firearms and ammunition and appropriates the revenue to the Firearms and Ammunition Excise Tax Cash Fund.	1,675,123	54.37	1,406,112	45.63	Legislatively referred state statute
Source: Colorado Secretary of State

Results by county

Amendment 79 results by county
Yes:
- 50–60%
- 60–70%
- 70–80%
- 80–90%
No:
- 50–60%
- 60–70%
- 70–80%

Amendment 80 results by county
Yes:
- 50–60%
- 60–70%
No:
- 50–60%
- 60–70%

Amendment G results by county
Yes:
- 50–60%
- 60–70%
- 70–80%
- 80–90%

Amendment H results by county
Yes:
- 50–60%
- 60–70%
- 70–80%
- 80–90%
No:
- 50–60%

Amendment I results by county
Yes:
- 50–60%
- 60–70%
- 70–80%

Amendment J results by county
Yes:
- 50–60%
- 60–70%
- 70–80%
- 80–90%
No:
- 50–60%
- 60–70%
- 70–80%

Amendment K results by county
Yes:
- 50–60%
- 60–70%
No:
- 50–60%
- 60–70%
- 70–80%

Proposition 127 results by county
Yes:
- 50–60%
No:
- 50–60%
- 60–70%
- 70–80%
- 80–90%
- >90%

Proposition 128 results by county
Yes:
- 50–60%
- 60–70%
- 70–80%
No:
- 50–60%

Proposition 129 results by county
Yes:
- 50–60%
- 60–70%
No:
- 50–60%
- 60–70%

Proposition 130 results by county
Yes:
- 50–60%
- 60–70%
No:
- 50–60%

Proposition 131 results by county
Yes:
- 50–60%
No:
- 50–60%
- 60–70%
- 70–80%

Proposition JJ results by county
Yes:
- 50–60%
- 60–70%
- 70–80%
- 80–90%
No:
- 50–60%

Proposition KK results by county
Yes:
- 50–60%
- 60–70%
- 70–80%
No:
- 50–60%
- 60–70%
- 70–80%
- 80–90%

== See also ==
- Politics of Colorado
  - Colorado Democratic Party
  - Colorado Republican Party
  - Political party strength in Colorado
- Elections in Colorado
- Government of Colorado
