= 2024 United States presidential election in Colorado =

- November 5, 2024
- Turnout: 79.85% (▼7.02 pp)

Nominee	Kamala Harris	Donald Trump
Party	Democratic	Republican
Home state	California	Florida
Running mate	Tim Walz	JD Vance
Electoral vote	10	0
Popular vote	1,728,159	1,377,441
Percentage	54.13%	43.14%

Harris
40–50%
50–60%
60–70%
70–80%
80–90%
90–100%
Trump
40–50%
50–60%
60–70%
70–80%
80–90%
90–100%
Tie/No data
President before election
Joe Biden
Democratic
Elected President
Donald Trump
Republican

The 2024 United States presidential election in Colorado took place on Tuesday, November 5, 2024, as part of the 2024 United States presidential election in which all 50 states plus the District of Columbia participated. Colorado voters chose electors to represent them in the Electoral College via a popular vote. The state of Colorado has 10 electoral votes in the Electoral College, following reapportionment due to the 2020 United States census in which the state gained a seat.

Notably, despite following the nationwide trend toward the Republicans, Colorado did not see as large of a shift rightward compared to other safe blue states, but Republicans did flip one seat in Colorado's congressional delegation. Harris won by 11%, only 2.5% down from Biden in 2020, significantly better than Hillary Clinton's margin of 4.9% in 2016 and exceeding Barack Obama's margins in both 2008 and 2012. Republicans have not won a presidential election in Colorado since 2004.

For the second presidential election in a row, Colorado voted to the left of neighboring New Mexico. This was the first time Colorado voted for a Democratic nominee who lost the popular vote since 1908. This was also only the second time the Democratic nominee won Colorado by double digits since 1964, after 2020; and the first time since 1964 where Colorado voted to the left of Illinois.

Grand County was the closest Harris came to flipping a county Trump had won in 2020, in terms of margin percentage, with the county shifting leftward from the previous presidential election and Harris only losing the county by a mere 79 votes out of the 9,884 total votes cast in the county. This was also the only state where Trump earned a smaller percentage of the vote than his first run in 2016.

== Primary elections ==
=== Democratic primary ===
The Colorado Democratic primary was held on Super Tuesday, March 5, 2024.

2024 Colorado Democratic pres. primary
Candidate	Votes	%	Delegates
Joe Biden (incumbent)	477,365	82.45	72
Dean Phillips	17,936	3.10	0
Marianne Williamson	16,761	2.90	0
Gabriel Cornejo	4,313	0.74	0
Jason Palmer	3,986	0.69	0
Armando Perez-Serrato	2,591	0.45	0
Frankie Lozada	2,402	0.41	0
Stephen Lyons	1,481	0.26	0
Noncommitted Delegate	52,122	9.00	0
Total	578,957	100%	72

=== Republican primary ===
The Colorado Republican primary was held on Super Tuesday, March 5, 2024.

Colorado Republican primary, March 5, 2024
Candidate	Votes	Percentage	Actual delegate count		
Candidate	Votes	Percentage	Bound	Unbound	Total
Donald Trump	555,863	63.46%	24		
Nikki Haley	291,615	33.29%	12		
Ron DeSantis (withdrawn)	12,672	1.45%			
Chris Christie (withdrawn)	7,188	0.82%			
Vivek Ramaswamy (withdrawn)	5,113	0.58%			
Ryan Binkley (withdrawn)	2,220	0.25%			
Asa Hutchinson (withdrawn)	1,269	0.14%			
Total:	875,940	100.00%	36	1	37

=== 14th Amendment lawsuit ===
The Citizens for Responsibility and Ethics in Washington, a left-leaning non-profit, filed a lawsuit on behalf of four Republicans and independent voters, saying that Donald Trump is ineligible to run for president because of a section in the 14th Amendment that states "no person shall ... hold any office, civil or military, under the United States ... who, having previously taken an oath .... as an officer of the United States ... shall have engaged in insurrection or rebellion against the same, or given aid or comfort to the enemies thereof". A trial on this case took place during October and November 2023. The judge found that Trump engaged in insurrection but declined to remove Trump from the primary ballot, saying there is "scant direct evidence regarding whether the Presidency is one of the positions subject to disqualification". On December 19, 2023, the Colorado Supreme Court ruled that Trump is disqualified from the Presidency under Section 3 of the 14th Amendment and ordered that Trump be removed from the 2024 Colorado Republican presidential primary ballot.

Trump appealed this ruling to the Supreme Court of the United States, and arguments were heard in February. The Colorado decision was stayed pending appeal, and Trump was included on the certified ballot, which began to be mailed to overseas voters on January 20. On March 4, 2024, the Supreme Court issued a ruling unanimously reversing the Colorado Supreme Court decision, ruling that states had no authority to remove Trump from their ballots, and this was instead a power held by Congress.

== General election ==
=== Candidates ===
The deadline for minor party candidates to qualify for the ballot was July 1, 2024, while independents could petition for ballot access until July 11. In September, Colorado secretary of state Jena Griswold published the following candidates as certified to appear on the general election ballot:

- Kamala Harris / Tim Walz — Democratic
- Donald Trump / JD Vance — Republican
- Blake Huber / Andrea Denault — Approval Voting
- Chase Oliver / Mike ter Maat — Libertarian
- Jill Stein / Butch Ware — Green
- Randall Terry / Stephen Broden — American Constitution
- Cornel West / Melina Abdullah — Unity
- Robert F. Kennedy Jr. / Nicole Shanahan — unaffiliated

Additionally, the state published a list of certified write-in candidates, the deadline for which was on July 18:

- Chris Garrity / Cody Ballard – unaffiliated
- Claudia De la Cruz / Karina Garcia — Socialism and Liberation
- Shiva Ayyadurai / Crystal Ellis – unaffiliated
- Peter Sonski / Lauren Onak — American Solidarity
- Bill Frankel / Steve Jenkins – unaffiliated
- Brian Anthony Perry / Mark Sbani — Democratic

=== Predictions ===
Source	Ranking	As of
Cook Political Report	Solid D	December 19, 2023
Inside Elections	Solid D	April 26, 2023
Sabato's Crystal Ball	Safe D	June 29, 2023
Decision Desk HQ/The Hill	Likely D	November 1, 2024
CNalysis	Solid D	December 30, 2023
CNN	Lean D	August 25, 2024
The Economist	Safe D	October 21, 2024
538	Solid D	October 30, 2024
NBC News	Safe D	October 6, 2024
YouGov	Safe D	October 16, 2024
Split Ticket	Likely D	November 1, 2024

=== Polling ===
Kamala Harris vs. Donald Trump

Poll source	Date(s) administered	Sample size (Note: Key: A – all adults RV – registered voters LV – likely voters V – unclear)	Margin of error	Kamala Harris Democratic	Donald Trump Republican	Other / Undecided
Keating Research	October 28−30, 2024	600 (LV)	± 4.0%	53%	41%	7% (Note: "Someone else" with 2%)
YouGov	October 18−30, 2024	754 (LV)	± 4.54%	55%	41%	4%
ActiVote	October 1−30, 2024	400 (LV)	± 4.9%	57%	43%	–
ActiVote	September 15 − October 19, 2024	400 (LV)	± 4.9%	59%	41%	–
Morning Consult	September 9−18, 2024	512 (LV)	± 4.0%	53%	42%	5%
Keating Research	September 11–14, 2024	500 (LV)	± 4.4%	53%	42%	5%
Morning Consult	August 30 – September 8, 2024	498 (LV)	± 4.0%	55%	40%	5%

Hypothetical polling with Joe Biden and Donald Trump

Joe Biden vs. Donald Trump

Poll source	Date(s) administered	Sample size	Margin of error	Joe Biden Democratic	Donald Trump Republican	Other / Undecided
	July 21, 2024	Joe Biden withdraws from the race.				
Global Strategy Group (D) (Note: Poll sponsored by ProgressNow Colorado)	June 17–24, 2024	800 (RV)	± 3.5%	50%	40%	10%
John Zogby Strategies (Note: Poll conducted for Kennedy's campaign)	April 13–21, 2024	529 (LV)	–	49%	43%	8%
New Bridge Strategy (R)/Aspect Strategic (D) (Note: Poll sponsored by the Colorado Polling Institute)	March 15–19, 2024	632 (LV)	± 4.0%	49%	39%	12%
Mainstreet Research/Florida Atlantic University	February 29 – March 3, 2024	170 (LV)	–	48%	44%	8%
Mainstreet Research/Florida Atlantic University	February 29 – March 3, 2024	179 (RV)	–	48%	43%	9%
Emerson College	January 23–28, 2024	1,856 (RV)	± 2.2%	41%	35%	24%
Global Strategy Group (D)	January 22–28, 2024	801 (RV)	± 4.2%	49%	41%	10%
YouGov/University of Colorado Boulder	December 1–18, 2023	800 (A)	± 4.2%	47%	40%	13%
Cygnal (R)/Aspect Strategies (D)	November 26–27, 2023	652 (LV)	± 3.8%	45%	36%	19%
Emerson College	October 1–4, 2023	477 (LV)	± 4.4%	42%	38%	20%
Public Opinion Strategies (R)	May 7–9, 2023	500 (LV)	–	49%	39%	12%
Emerson College	October 26–29, 2022	1,000 (LV)	± 3.0%	47%	39%	14%
Emerson College	September 18–19, 2022	1,000 (LV)	± 3.0%	46%	36%	18%
McLaughlin & Associates (R)	July 24–26, 2022	500 (LV)	± 4.4%	50%	43%	6%
Blueprint Polling (D)	April 6–8, 2022	612 (V)	± 4.0%	43%	43%	14%

Joe Biden vs. Donald Trump vs. Robert F. Kennedy Jr. vs. Cornel West vs. Jill Stein

Poll source	Date(s) administered	Sample size	Margin of error	Joe Biden Democratic	Donald Trump Republican	Robert Kennedy Jr. Independent	Cornel West Independent	Jill Stein Green	Other / Undecided
	July 21, 2024	Joe Biden withdraws from the race.							
Global Strategy Group (D)	June 17–24, 2024	800 (RV)	± 3.5%	42%	36%	12%	2%	3%	5%

Hypothetical polling with other candidates

Joe Biden vs. Ron DeSantis

Poll source	Date(s) administered	Sample size	Margin of error	Joe Biden Democratic	Ron DeSantis Republican	Other / Undecided
YouGov/University of Colorado Boulder	December 1–18, 2023	800 (A)	± 4.2%	46%	33%	21%
Public Opinion Strategies (R)	May 7–9, 2023	500 (LV)	–	44%	41%	15%

Joe Biden vs. Robert F. Kennedy Jr.

Poll source	Date(s) administered	Sample size	Margin of error	Joe Biden Democratic	Robert Kennedy Jr. Independent	Other / Undecided
John Zogby Strategies	April 13–21, 2024	529 (LV)	–	42%	48%	10%

Robert F. Kennedy Jr. vs. Donald Trump

Poll source	Date(s) administered	Sample size	Margin of error	Robert Kennedy Jr. Independent	Donald Trump Republican	Other / Undecided
John Zogby Strategies	April 13–21, 2024	529 (LV)	–	47%	35%	18%

Generic Democrat vs. generic Republican

Poll source	Date(s) administered	Sample size	Margin of error	Generic Democrat	Generic Republican	Other / Undecided
Blueprint Polling (D)	April 6–8, 2022	612 (V)	± 4.0%	43%	42%	16%

=== Results ===
State House district results: Trump 40–50% 50–60% 60–70% 70–80% / Harris 40–50% 50–60% 60–70% 70–80% 80–90%

2024 United States presidential election in Colorado
Party	Candidate	Votes	%	±%
Democratic	Kamala Harris; Tim Walz	1,728,159	54.13%	−1.27%
Republican	Donald Trump; JD Vance	1,377,441	43.14%	+1.24%
Independent	Robert F. Kennedy Jr. (withdrawn); Nicole Shanahan (withdrawn)	35,623	1.12%	N/A
Libertarian	Chase Oliver; Mike ter Maat	21,439	0.67%	−0.94%
Green	Jill Stein; Butch Ware	17,344	0.54%	+0.26%
Unity	Cornel West; Melina Abdullah	5,149	0.16%	+0.08%
American Constitution	Randall Terry; Stephen Broden	3,522	0.11%	−0.05%
Approval Voting	Blake Huber; Andrea Denault	2,196	0.07%	+0.06%
American Solidarity	Peter Sonski (write-in); Lauren Onak (write-in)	910	0.03%	−0.05%
Socialism and Liberation	Claudia De la Cruz (write-in) Karina Garcia (write-in)	905	0.03%	Steady
Independent	Chris Garrity (write-in); Cody Ballard (write-in)	30	0.00%	N/A
Independent	Shiva Ayyadurai (write-in); Crystal Ellis (write-in)	15	0.00%	N/A
Write-in		12	0.00%	N/A
Total votes		3,192,745	100.00%	N/A

==== By county ====
County	Kamala Harris Democratic		Donald Trump Republican		Various candidates Other parties		Margin		Total
County	#	%	#	%	#	%	#	%	Total
Adams	124,056	53.13%	103,024	44.12%	6,411	2.75%	21,032	9.01%	233,491
Alamosa	3,244	43.09%	4,057	53.88%	228	3.03%	-813	-10.80%	7,529
Arapahoe	190,725	58.57%	125,311	38.48%	9,595	2.95%	65,414	20.09%	325,631
Archuleta	3,904	41.72%	5,218	55.77%	235	2.51%	-1,314	-14.04%	9,357
Baca	275	13.72%	1,686	84.13%	43	2.15%	-1,411	-70.41%	2,004
Bent	645	29.47%	1,496	68.34%	48	2.19%	-851	-38.88%	2,189
Boulder	150,149	76.49%	40,758	20.76%	5,397	2.75%	109,391	55.73%	196,304
Broomfield	29,426	62.81%	16,071	34.30%	1,351	2.88%	13,355	28.51%	46,848
Chaffee	7,992	55.41%	6,034	41.84%	397	2.75%	1,958	13.58%	14,423
Cheyenne	108	10.24%	930	88.15%	17	1.61%	-822	-77.91%	1,055
Clear Creek	3,464	56.77%	2,452	40.18%	186	3.05%	1,012	16.58%	6,102
Conejos	1,627	39.63%	2,358	57.44%	120	2.92%	-731	-17.81%	4,105
Costilla	1,155	55.53%	850	40.87%	75	3.61%	305	14.66%	2,080
Crowley	422	24.74%	1,231	72.16%	53	3.11%	-809	-47.42%	1,706
Custer	1,188	30.72%	2,583	66.80%	96	2.48%	-1,395	-36.07%	3,867
Delta	6,030	30.96%	12,948	66.47%	500	2.57%	-6,918	-35.52%	19,478
Denver	278,634	76.65%	74,765	20.57%	10,120	2.78%	203,869	56.08%	363,519
Dolores	325	22.90%	1,076	75.83%	18	1.27%	-751	-52.92%	1,419
Douglas	110,408	45.27%	127,451	52.26%	6,033	2.47%	-17,043	-6.99%	243,892
Eagle	16,943	60.94%	10,148	36.50%	714	2.57%	6,795	24.44%	27,805
El Paso	166,597	43.73%	203,933	53.53%	10,456	2.74%	-37,336	-9.80%	380,986
Elbert	4,768	23.35%	15,209	74.47%	445	2.18%	-10,441	-51.13%	20,422
Fremont	7,526	29.55%	17,313	67.97%	631	2.48%	-9,787	-38.43%	25,470
Garfield	15,128	49.80%	14,493	47.71%	755	2.49%	635	2.09%	30,376
Gilpin	2,254	54.58%	1,729	41.86%	147	3.56%	525	12.71%	4,130
Grand	4,743	47.99%	4,822	48.79%	319	3.23%	-79	-0.80%	9,884
Gunnison	6,887	62.94%	3,689	33.71%	366	3.34%	3,198	29.23%	10,942
Hinsdale	257	42.34%	332	54.70%	18	2.97%	-75	-12.36%	607
Huerfano	1,965	44.24%	2,346	52.81%	131	2.95%	-381	-8.58%	4,442
Jackson	173	20.74%	634	76.02%	27	3.24%	-461	-55.28%	834
Jefferson	210,875	58.30%	140,505	38.84%	10,336	2.86%	70,370	19.45%	361,716
Kiowa	102	11.82%	744	86.21%	17	1.97%	-642	-74.39%	863
Kit Carson	556	15.04%	3,083	83.37%	59	1.60%	-2,527	-68.33%	3,698
La Plata	20,677	57.93%	14,024	39.29%	991	2.78%	6,653	18.64%	35,692
Lake	2,199	56.20%	1,557	39.79%	157	4.01%	642	16.41%	3,913
Larimer	129,376	57.33%	89,680	39.74%	6,598	2.92%	39,696	17.59%	225,654
Las Animas	3,276	42.04%	4,328	55.54%	189	2.43%	-1,052	-13.50%	7,793
Lincoln	432	16.80%	2,090	81.29%	49	1.91%	-1,658	-64.49%	2,571
Logan	2,098	20.64%	7,855	77.27%	213	2.10%	-5,757	-56.63%	10,166
Mesa	33,573	36.64%	55,839	60.95%	2,208	2.41%	-22,266	-24.30%	91,620
Mineral	317	42.10%	417	55.38%	19	2.52%	-100	-13.28%	753
Moffat	1,167	17.49%	5,358	80.32%	146	2.19%	-4,191	-62.82%	6,671
Montezuma	5,793	38.27%	8,972	59.26%	374	2.47%	-3,179	-21.00%	15,139
Montrose	8,354	32.60%	16,704	65.18%	568	2.22%	-8,350	-32.58%	25,626
Morgan	3,291	24.44%	9,830	73.00%	344	2.55%	-6,539	-48.56%	13,465
Otero	3,164	35.45%	5,520	61.84%	242	2.71%	-2,356	-26.39%	8,926
Ouray	2,442	59.59%	1,573	38.38%	83	2.03%	869	21.21%	4,098
Park	4,841	40.18%	6,828	56.67%	380	3.15%	-1,987	-16.49%	12,049
Phillips	412	17.49%	1,888	80.17%	55	2.34%	-1,476	-62.68%	2,355
Pitkin	7,932	71.02%	2,992	26.79%	245	2.19%	4,940	44.23%	11,169
Prowers	1,227	23.85%	3,833	74.50%	85	1.65%	-2,606	-50.65%	5,145
Pueblo	39,328	46.20%	43,688	51.33%	2,104	2.47%	-4,360	-5.12%	85,120
Rio Blanco	637	17.25%	2,988	80.93%	67	1.81%	-2,351	-63.68%	3,692
Rio Grande	2,306	37.23%	3,743	60.43%	145	2.34%	-1,437	-23.20%	6,194
Routt	10,208	62.49%	5,676	34.75%	451	2.76%	4,532	27.74%	16,335
Saguache	1,704	50.10%	1,577	46.37%	120	3.53%	127	3.73%	3,401
San Juan	376	63.84%	188	31.92%	25	4.24%	188	31.92%	589
San Miguel	3,529	73.46%	1,154	24.02%	121	2.52%	2,375	49.44%	4,804
Sedgwick	283	20.84%	1,048	77.17%	27	1.99%	-765	-56.33%	1,358
Summit	11,762	67.04%	5,244	29.89%	539	3.07%	6,518	37.15%	17,545
Teller	5,065	31.00%	10,856	66.45%	417	2.55%	-5,791	-35.44%	16,338
Washington	329	11.72%	2,436	86.81%	41	1.46%	-2,107	-75.09%	2,806
Weld	68,752	38.21%	106,469	59.18%	4,700	2.61%	-37,717	-20.96%	179,921
Yuma	758	16.26%	3,807	81.64%	98	2.10%	-3,049	-65.39%	4,663
Totals	1,728,159	54.13%	1,377,441	43.14%	87,145	2.73%	350,718	10.98%	3,192,745

County that flipped from Democratic to Republican

- Pueblo (largest municipality: Pueblo)

==== By congressional district ====
Harris and Trump each won four of eight congressional districts.

District	Harris	Trump	Representative
1st	76.52%	20.58%	Diana DeGette
2nd	68.46%	28.70%	Joe Neguse
3rd	43.88%	53.61%	Lauren Boebert (118th Congress)
3rd	43.88%	53.61%	Jeff Hurd (119th Congress)
4th	39.63%	57.87%	Greg Lopez (118th Congress)
4th	39.63%	57.87%	Lauren Boebert (119th Congress)
5th	44.08%	53.16%	Doug Lamborn (118th Congress)
5th	44.08%	53.16%	Jeff Crank (119th Congress)
6th	58.42%	38.66%	Jason Crow
7th	56.04%	41.12%	Brittany Pettersen
8th	47.73%	49.56%	Yadira Caraveo (118th Congress)
8th	47.73%	49.56%	Gabe Evans (119th Congress)

== Analysis ==
A fast-growing Mountain West state that was formerly Republican leaning, no Republican has won Colorado by double digits at the presidential level since Ronald Reagan in his 1984 landslide re-election victory. Colorado was consistently competitive at the presidential level from the late 1980s going through the 2010s, including Hillary Clinton winning the state by 5% in 2016. In 2020, Democrat Joe Biden carried the state by 13.5%, becoming the first presidential candidate to win Colorado by a double-digit margin since Reagan. The last Republican to win the Centennial State's electoral votes was George W. Bush in his 2004 re-election victory, which he won by a margin of 4.7%. Today, Colorado is a blue state, with Democrats winning the state in every presidential election starting in 2008, occupying every statewide office since 2023, and holding comfortable majorities in its state legislature.

Trump flipped Pueblo County, which he had won in 2016 but lost in 2020. Nonetheless, he became the first Republican to win the White House without carrying Chaffee or Garfield Counties since William Howard Taft in 1908. Despite the state and the nation swinging right as a whole, several large Colorado counties defied national trends and shifted left, including the West Denver suburban counties of Jefferson, Broomfield, and Douglas. Outside of Denver, other large Front Range counties also shifted left, such as Larimer County, home of the city of Fort Collins; and El Paso County, home of Colorado Springs. Harris won the highest percentage of the vote in El Paso County since Lyndon B. Johnson's 1964 victory and was also the first Democratic presidential candidate to lose the county by only single digits since 1964.

This is the first time since 2000 that Colorado voted for the popular vote loser, and the first time since 1908 that it voted for a Democrat that lost the popular vote. This is also the first time since 1996 that Colorado backed the loser of both the electoral vote and the overall popular vote. Additionally, Trump won 43.1% of the vote in Colorado, an improvement from his 41.9% share of the statewide vote in 2020, but he still underperformed his 2016 results, in which he received 43.3% of the vote. This made Colorado the only state in the nation in which Trump's 2016 run was the best statewide performance out of his three runs in terms of vote share. Furthermore, it is the only state in the nation to be decided by single digits in 2016 and by double digits in both 2020 and 2024, and the state that posted Harris's strongest improvement over Clinton's 2016 performance, at 6.1 percentage points.

Trump also became the first president since Franklin D. Roosevelt in 1940 and 1944 to win two elections without carrying Colorado, and the first Republican to do so since William McKinley in 1896 and 1900.

Colorado and Virginia have voted for the same presidential candidate in every election since 1996. This was also the first election that Colorado voted Democratic while Nevada voted Republican.

== See also ==
- United States presidential elections in Colorado
- 2024 United States presidential election
- 2024 Democratic Party presidential primaries
- 2024 Republican Party presidential primaries
- 2024 United States elections
- 2024 Colorado elections
- 2024 Colorado State Board of Regents at-large election
