= 2024 University of Colorado Board of Regents at-large election =

2024 Colorado State Board of Regents at-large election
- November 5, 2024
Nominee	Elliott Hood	Eric Rinard
Party	Democratic	Republican
Popular vote	1,478,661	1,363,271
Percentage	50.45%	46.52%
- County results Hood: 40–50% 50–60% 60–70% 70–80% Rinard: 50–60% 60–70% 70–80% 80–90%
CU Regent before election
Lesley Smith
Democratic
Elected CU Regent
Elliott Hood
Democratic

The 2024 Colorado State Board of Regents at-large election took place on November 5, 2024, to elect an at-large member of the University of Colorado Board of Regents. Incumbent Democratic CU Regent Lesley Smith did not seek re-election and successfully ran in the state house instead after serving a single term, leaving the seat open.

Democratic nominee Elliott Hood won the general election with 50.5% of the vote, defeating Republican Eric Rinard, who received 46.5%. T.J. Cole of the Unity Party of America and Thomas Reasoner of the Approval Voting Party also appeared on the ballot but finished far behind. With Republicans and Democrats both holding four district seats, Hood’s victory preserved a narrow 5–4 Democratic majority on the Board of Regents.

This was the first statewide election since the 2020 United States Senate election in Colorado in which a Democrat won by a margin of less than ten percentage points.

== Background ==
The State Board of Regents' nine voting members are chosen in biennial partisan elections and serve staggered six-year terms. One regent is elected to represent each of Colorado's congressional districts, and one is elected at-large by the entire state electorate.

=== Members after the 2024 elections ===
University of Colorado Board of Regents
District	Regent	Party	Term expires
1st	Wanda James	Democratic	2029
2nd	Callie Rennison (Chair)	Democratic	2027
3rd	Ray Scott	Republican	2031
4th	Frank McNulty	Republican	2029
5th	Ken Montera (Vice Chair)	Republican	2031
6th	Ilana Dubin Spiegel	Democratic	2027
7th	Nolbert Chavez	Democratic	2027
8th	Mark VanDriel	Republican	2029
At large	Elliott Hood	Democratic	2031

== Democratic primary ==
=== Candidates ===
- Elliott Hood, attorney
- Charles "CJ" Johnson, Diversity, equity, and inclusion executive

=== Primary results ===
Democratic primary results
Party	Candidate	Votes	%
Democratic	Elliott Hood	229,323	52.13%
Democratic	Charles "CJ" Johnson	210,556	47.87%
Total votes		439,879	100%

== Republican primary ==
=== Candidates ===
- Eric Rinard, engineer

=== Primary results ===
Republican primary results
Party	Candidate	Votes	%
Republican	Eric Rinard	376,965	100%
Total votes		376,965	100%

== Third party candidates ==
- T.J. Cole (Unity), attorney
- Thomas Reasoner (Approval Voting)

== General election ==
=== Results ===
2024 Colorado State Board of Regents at-large election
Party	Candidate	Votes	%	±%
Democratic	Elliott Hood	1,478,661	50.45%	−1.50%
Republican	Eric Rinard	1,363,271	46.52%	+3.50%
Unity	T.J. Cole	59,612	2.03%	−1.79%
Approval Voting	Thomas Reasoner	29,232	1.00%	−0.21%
Total votes		2,930,776	100.00%	
Democratic hold				

== Analysis ==
Elliott Hood’s victory reflected continued Democratic strength in the Denver metropolitan area and along Colorado’s Front Range Urban Corridor. Hood performed the best in Boulder and Denver.

Eric Rinard nevertheless outperformed the 2024 Republican presidential nominee Donald Trump in several areas, particularly within traditionally suburban and urban Republican strongholds such as Douglas County and El Paso County, where Rinard earned over 57% of the vote in each. He also kept margins relatively close in the populous suburban counties surrounding Denver and Boulder, preventing a Democratic landslide in the region. In addition, Rinard performed notably well for a Republican in several mountain and ski resort counties.

== See also ==
- 2024 United States presidential election in Colorado
- 2024 United States House of Representatives elections in Colorado
- 2024 Colorado elections
- 2016 Colorado State Board of Regents at-large election
