= 2016 United States presidential election in Colorado =

- November 8, 2016
- Turnout: 74.39% (▲3.22 pp)

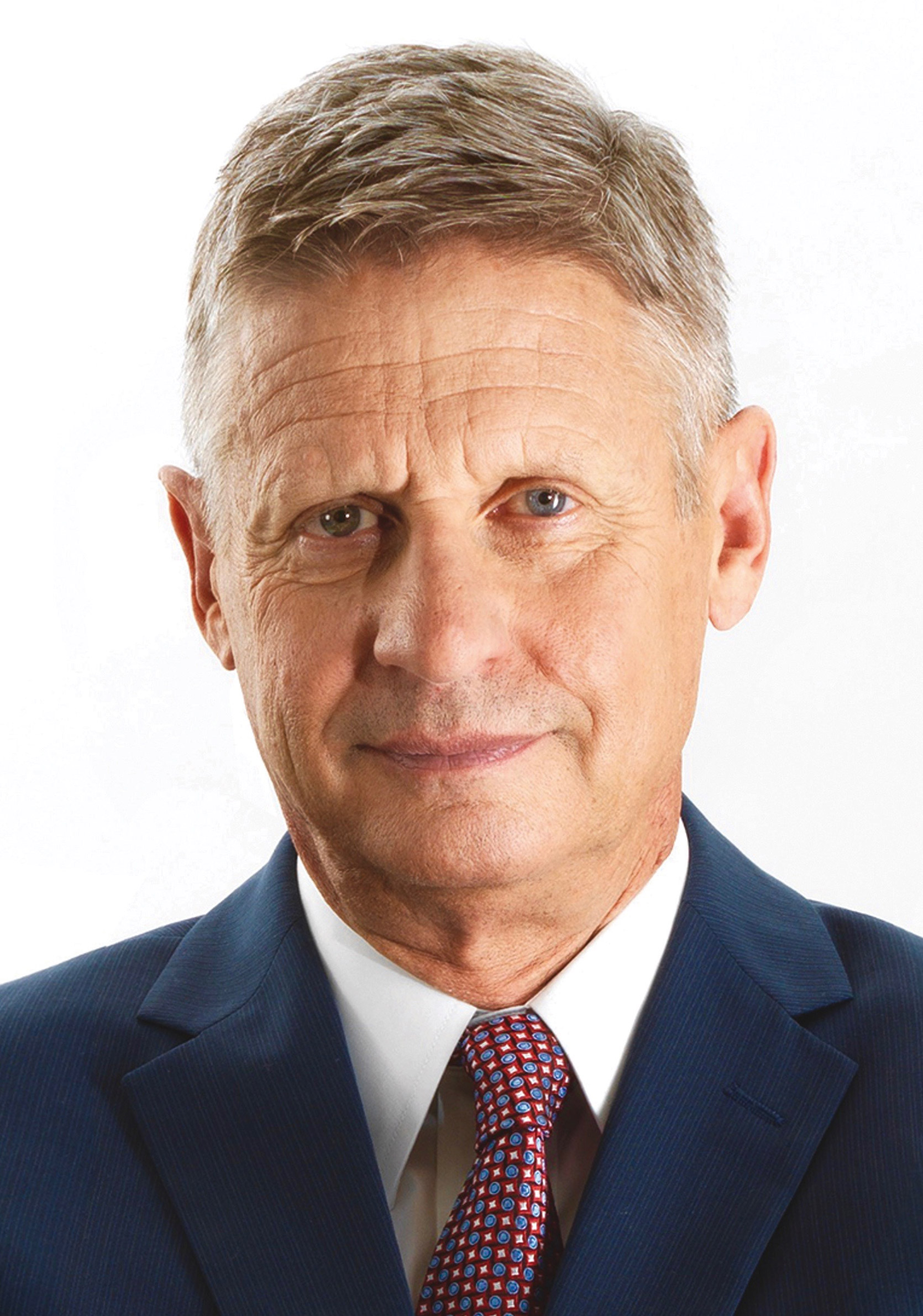
Nominee	Hillary Clinton	Donald Trump	Gary Johnson
Party	Democratic	Republican	Libertarian
Home state	New York	New York	New Mexico
Running mate	Tim Kaine	Mike Pence	Bill Weld
Electoral vote	9	0	0
Popular vote	1,338,870	1,202,484	144,121
Percentage	48.16%	43.25%	5.18%

Clinton
40–50%
50–60%
60–70%
70–80%
80–90%
90–100%
Trump
40–50%
50–60%
60–70%
70–80%
80–90%
90–100%
Tie/No data
President before election
Barack Obama
Democratic
Elected President
Donald Trump
Republican

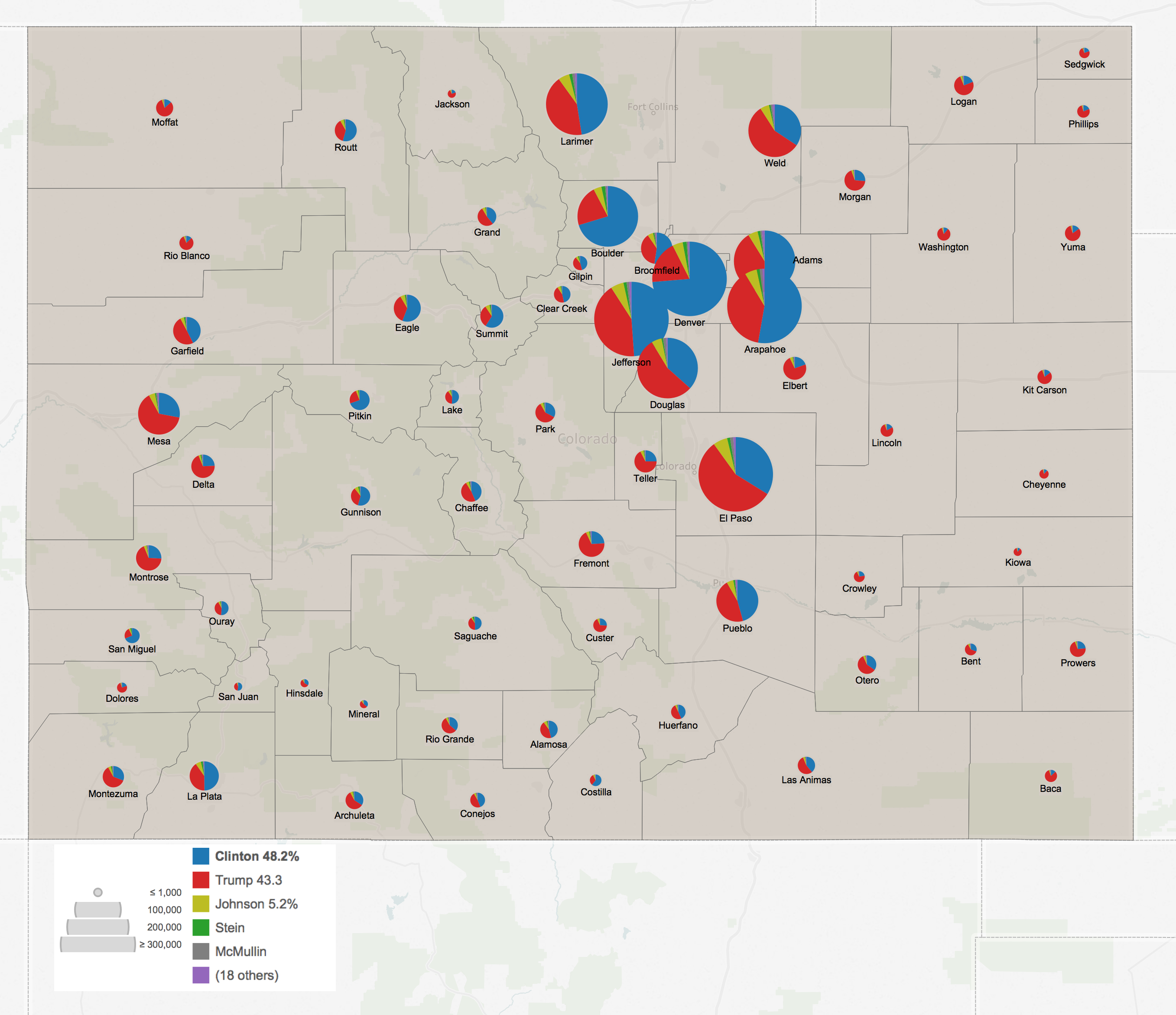
Results by county showing number of votes by size and candidates by color

Treemap of the popular vote by county

The 2016 United States presidential election in Colorado was held on Tuesday, November 8, 2016, as part of the 2016 United States presidential election in which all 50 states plus the District of Columbia participated. Colorado voters chose electors to represent them in the Electoral College via a popular vote, pitting the Republican nominee, businessman Donald Trump, and running mate Indiana Governor Mike Pence against Democratic nominee, former Secretary of State Hillary Clinton, and her running mate Virginia Senator Tim Kaine. Colorado has nine electoral votes in the Electoral College.

Clinton received 48.2% of the vote, carrying the state's nine electoral votes. Trump received 43.3% of the vote, thus marking a Democratic margin of victory of 4.9%. This was the fourth time since Colorado had achieved statehood that the Republican nominee won the election without carrying Colorado, the first three having been in 1896, 1900, and 1908 (all when the Democratic nominee was William Jennings Bryan of neighboring Nebraska, a populist with unusual popularity in the traditionally Republican West); and the second time Colorado has voted Democratic in three consecutive presidential elections, the first having been the elections of 1908, 1912, and 1916. Trump became the first ever Republican to win the White House without carrying Alamosa or Broomfield Counties, as well as the first to do so without carrying Jefferson, Arapahoe, or Larimer Counties since William McKinley in 1900, and the first to do so without carrying Ouray County since William Howard Taft in 1908.

At the same time, Trump flipped five counties in the state: Conejos, Chaffee, Huerfano, Las Animas, and Pueblo. The last two had not supported a Republican presidential candidate since Richard Nixon's landslide in 1972. Despite Clinton's victory, this is the sole election since Colorado's Democratic winning streak from 2008 forward that the Democratic candidate's percentage in the state was held to only a plurality, while winning the state by a less than (albeit very narrowly in this case) 5% margin. Colorado was also the only state that voted for Clinton won by a single digit in 2016 that would later vote for both Joe Biden in 2020 and Kamala Harris in 2024 by double digits.

== Caucuses ==
=== Democratic caucuses ===
==== Results ====
Caucus date: March 1, 2016

2016 Democratic Party's presidential nominating process in Colorado – Summary of results –
Candidate	Popular vote		Estimated delegates		
Candidate	Count	Percentage	Pledged	Unpledged	Total
Bernie Sanders	72,846	58.98%	41	0	41
Hillary Clinton	49,789	40.31%	25	9	34
Uncommitted	822	0.67%	0	3	3
Others	51	0.04%			
Total	123,508	100%	66	12	78

Detailed results for the Colorado Democratic caucuses, March 1, 2016
District	Total estimate		Bernie Sanders		Hillary Clinton	
District	Votes	Estimated delegates	Votes	Estimated delegates	Votes	Estimated delegates
1st district	29,474	8	16,232	4	13,242	4
2nd district	30,624	7	19,376	4	11,248	3
3rd district	14,671	6	8,956	4	5,715	2
4th district	10,060	5	6,115	3	3,945	2
5th district	10,315	5	6,338	3	3,977	2
6th district	12,836	6	6,675	3	6,161	3
7th district	14,655	6	9,154	4	5,501	4
At-large delegates	122,635	14	72,846	8	49,789	6
Pledged PLEOs	122,635	9	72,846	5	49,789	4
Total		66		38		28

Results of the county assemblies Timeframe for the county assemblies: March 2–26, 2016

Colorado Democratic county assemblies, March 2–26, 2016
Candidate	State + District delegates		Estimated delegates		
Candidate	Count	Percentage	Pledged	Unpledged	Total
Bernie Sanders	372	61.39%			
Hillary Clinton	234	38.61%			
Uncommitted					
Total	606	100%			

Results of the congressional district conventions

Detailed results for the congressional district conventions, April 1–15, 2016
District	Delegates available	Delegates won	
District	Delegates available	Sanders	Clinton
1st district	8	5	3
2nd district	7	4	3
3rd district	6	4	2
4th district	5	3	2
5th district	5	3	2
6th district	6	3	3
7th district	6	4	2
Total	43	26	17

Results of the state convention State convention date: April 16, 2016

Colorado Democratic State Convention, April 16, 2016
Candidate	State convention delegates		National delegates won		
Candidate	Count	Percentage	At-large	PLEO	Total
Bernie Sanders	1,900	62.3%	9	6	15
Hillary Clinton	1,150	37.7%	5	3	8
Total	3,050	100.0%	14	9	23

=== Republican conventions ===
From April 2–8, 2016, conventions were held in each of Colorado's seven congressional districts. Cruz swept all seven, winning 21 delegates total. On April 9, 2016, the state convention was held to elect the 13 statewide delegates and the 3 RNC delegates. Again, Cruz won all 13 statewide at-large delegates. Cruz was also the only candidate to address the state convention.

A proposal to forbid Colorado Republican delegates from voting for Donald Trump was written in March 2016 by Robert Zubrin. The group "Colorado Republicans for Liberty" handed out fliers of Zubrin's resolution at the state's convention. Irregularities on the ballot were discovered at the state's convention. Delegate #379 (Jerome Parks, a Trump delegate) was replaced on the ballot with a duplicate of delegate #378 (a Ted Cruz delegate). The Colorado Republican Party's Twitter account posted the message "We did it #NeverTrump" after Cruz received all the bound delegates at the April convention. The party claims somebody hacked its Twitter account, and the party claims to be investigating how the message was posted. In May 2015, the Colorado Senate defeated a bill to hold a 2016 presidential primary. State senators Kevin Grantham, Kent Lambert, Laura J. Woods, and Jerry Sonnenberg voted to stop the bill. Sonnenberg, Woods, Grantham, and Lambert are members of the Ted Cruz "Colorado Leadership Team" for Ted Cruz. Congressman Ken Buck and Colorado Secretary of State Wayne Williams are also members of the Ted Cruz "Colorado Leadership Team".

The conventions were selected through statewide caucuses, which were conducted at the precinct level on March 1. No voter preference poll was held due to a decision in August by the state party to cancel it.

Three candidates contested the Republican presidential conventions:

- Ted Cruz
- John Kasich
- Donald Trump

Marco Rubio and Ben Carson had dropped out of the race by the time the conventions were held, though they were still running during the March 1 caucuses.

Colorado Republican district conventions, April 2, 2016, April 7–8, 2016
Candidate	Votes	Percentage	Actual delegate count		
Candidate	Votes	Percentage	Bound	Unbound	Total
Ted Cruz	0	0.0%	17	4	21
Donald Trump	0	0.0%	0	0	0
John Kasich	0	0.0%	0	0	0
Marco Rubio (withdrawn)	0	0.0%	0	0	0
Ben Carson (withdrawn)	0	0.0%	0	0	0
Uncommitted	0	0.0%	0	0	0
Unprojected delegates:			0	0	0
Total:	0	100.00%	17	4	21
Source: The Green Papers

Colorado Republican state convention, April 9, 2016
Candidate	Votes	Percentage	Actual delegate count		
Candidate	Votes	Percentage	Bound	Unbound	Total
Ted Cruz	0	0.0%	13	0	13
Donald Trump	0	0.0%	0	1	1
John Kasich	0	0.0%	0	0	0
Marco Rubio (withdrawn)	0	0.0%	0	0	0
Ben Carson (withdrawn)	0	0.0%	0	0	0
Uncommitted	0	0.0%	0	0	0
Unprojected delegates:			0	2	2
Total:	0	100.00%	13	3	16
Source: The Green Papers

=== Green Party convention ===
On April 3, the Green Party of Colorado held a presidential nominating convention in Centennial, Colorado, for registered Green voters.

On April 4, the Green Party of Colorado announced that Jill Stein had won the convention and received all 5 delegates.

Colorado Green Party Convention, April 3, 2016.
Candidate	Votes	Percentage	National delegates
Jill Stein	-	-	5
William Kreml	-	-	-
Kent Mesplay	-	-	-
Sedinam Moyowasifza-Curry	-	-	-
Darryl Cherney	-	-	-
Uncommitted	-	-	-
Total	-	-	5

== General election ==
=== Polling ===
Throughout the race, Clinton lead in almost every poll in margins varying between 1 and 11 points, with a few polls showing a tie or a Trump lead. One of the last polls showed a tie between Clinton and Trump, but the last poll showed Clinton leading Trump 50% to 45%, which was very accurate compared to the results. The average of the last three polls showed Clinton leading Trump 44% to 41%.

=== Predictions ===
Source	Ranking	As of
ABC News	Lean D	November 8, 2016
CNN	Lean D	November 4, 2016
Cook Political Report	Lean D	November 7, 2016
Electoral-vote.com	Lean D	November 8, 2016
Rothenberg Political Report	Likely D	November 7, 2016
Sabato's Crystal Ball	Likely D	November 7, 2016
RealClearPolitics	Tossup	November 8, 2016

=== Results ===
Voter turnout for the 2016 United States presidential election in Colorado was 72.4%.

2016 United States presidential election in Colorado
Party	Candidate	Votes	%
Democratic	Hillary Clinton; Tim Kaine	1,338,870	48.16
Republican	Donald Trump; Mike Pence	1,202,484	43.25
Libertarian	Gary Johnson; Bill Weld	144,121	5.18
Green	Jill Stein; Ajamu Baraka	38,437	1.38
Independent	Evan McMullin; Nathan Johnson	28,917	1.04
American Constitution	Darrell L. Castle; Scott N. Bradley	11,699	0.42
Veterans of America	Chris Keniston; Deacon Taylor	5,028	0.18
Independent	Mike Smith; Daniel White	1,819	0.07
Independent American	Kyle Kopitke; Nathan Sorenson	1,096	0.04
Independent People	Joe Exotic; Douglas Terranova	872	0.03
American Solidarity	Mike Maturen; Juan Muñoz	862	0.03
Nutrition	Rod Silva; Richard Silva	751	0.03
Independent	Ryan Scott; Bruce Barnard	749	0.03
American	Tom Hoefling; Steve Schulin	710	0.03
Socialism and Liberation	Gloria La Riva; Dennis Banks	531	0.02
Socialist Workers	Alyson Kennedy; Osborne Hart	452	0.02
Kotlikoff for President	Laurence Kotlikoff; Edward Leamer	392	0.01
Nonviolent Resistance/Pacifist	Bradford Lyttle; Hannah Walsh	382	0.01
Approval Voting	Frank Atwood; Blake Huber	337	0.01
Socialist	Mimi Soltysik; Angela Nicole Walker	271	0.01
Prohibition	James Hedges; Bill Bayes	185	0.01
Republican	David Perry (write-in); Rick Seiley (write-in)	11	0.00
Independent (Republican)	Corey Sterner (write-in); Jeff Ryan (write-in)	6	0.00
Independent	Brian Perry (write-in); Michael Nelson (write-in)	4	0.00
Green (Democratic)	Bruce Lohmiller (write-in); J.R. Smith (write-in)	3	0.00
Independent	Cherunda Fox (write-in); Roger Kushner (write-in)	2	0.00
Independent (Libertarian)	Thomas Nieman (write-in); Bernie Jackson (write-in)	1	0.00
Total votes		2,780,247	100%
Democratic win			

==== By county ====
County	Hillary Clinton Democratic		Donald Trump Republican		Various candidates Other parties		Margin		Total votes cast
County	#	%	#	%	#	%	#	%	Total votes cast
Adams	96,558	49.86%	80,082	41.35%	17,037	8.79%	16,476	8.51%	193,677
Alamosa	3,189	45.96%	3,046	43.90%	704	10.14%	143	2.06%	6,939
Arapahoe	159,885	52.76%	117,053	38.63%	26,110	8.61%	42,832	14.13%	303,048
Archuleta	2,500	34.06%	4,264	58.10%	575	7.84%	-1,764	-24.04%	7,339
Baca	283	13.14%	1,753	81.42%	117	5.44%	-1,470	-68.28%	2,153
Bent	590	30.62%	1,188	61.65%	149	7.73%	-598	-31.03%	1,927
Boulder	132,334	70.34%	41,396	22.00%	14,415	7.66%	90,938	48.34%	188,145
Broomfield	19,731	52.35%	14,367	38.12%	3,592	9.53%	5,364	14.23%	37,690
Chaffee	4,888	43.45%	5,391	47.92%	971	8.63%	-503	-4.47%	11,250
Cheyenne	132	11.98%	925	83.94%	45	4.08%	-793	-71.96%	1,102
Clear Creek	2,729	46.52%	2,575	43.90%	562	9.58%	154	2.62%	5,866
Conejos	1,771	44.03%	1,914	47.59%	337	8.38%	-143	-3.56%	4,022
Costilla	1,125	60.88%	588	31.82%	135	7.30%	537	29.06%	1,848
Crowley	339	22.20%	1,079	70.66%	109	7.14%	-740	-48.46%	1,527
Custer	797	25.99%	2,061	67.22%	208	6.79%	-1,264	-41.23%	3,066
Delta	4,087	24.34%	11,655	69.42%	1,048	6.24%	-7,568	-45.08%	16,790
Denver	244,551	73.69%	62,690	18.89%	24,611	7.42%	181,861	54.80%	331,852
Dolores	242	19.28%	944	75.22%	69	5.50%	-702	-55.94%	1,255
Douglas	68,657	36.62%	102,573	54.71%	16,270	8.67%	-33,916	-18.09%	187,500
Eagle	14,099	55.90%	8,990	35.64%	2,134	8.46%	5,109	20.26%	25,223
El Paso	108,010	33.86%	179,228	56.19%	31,730	9.95%	-71,218	-22.33%	318,968
Elbert	3,134	19.61%	11,705	73.25%	1,141	7.14%	-8,571	-53.64%	15,980
Fremont	5,297	24.11%	15,122	68.82%	1,554	7.07%	-9,825	-44.71%	21,973
Garfield	11,271	42.58%	13,132	49.61%	2,067	7.81%	-1,861	-7.03%	26,470
Gilpin	1,634	45.69%	1,566	43.79%	376	10.52%	68	1.90%	3,576
Grand	3,358	39.10%	4,494	52.33%	736	8.57%	-1,136	-13.23%	8,588
Gunnison	5,128	54.48%	3,289	34.94%	995	10.58%	1,839	19.54%	9,412
Hinsdale	197	33.45%	339	57.56%	53	8.99%	-142	-24.11%	589
Huerfano	1,633	43.17%	1,883	49.78%	267	7.05%	-250	-6.61%	3,783
Jackson	171	19.86%	629	73.05%	61	7.09%	-458	-53.19%	861
Jefferson	160,776	48.89%	138,177	42.01%	29,930	9.10%	22,599	6.88%	328,883
Kiowa	91	10.64%	728	85.15%	36	4.21%	-637	-74.51%	855
Kit Carson	536	14.48%	2,967	80.15%	199	5.37%	-2,431	-65.67%	3,702
La Plata	15,525	49.84%	12,587	40.41%	3,038	9.75%	2,938	9.43%	31,150
Lake	1,616	50.52%	1,270	39.70%	313	9.78%	346	10.82%	3,199
Larimer	93,113	47.51%	83,430	42.57%	19,438	9.92%	9,683	4.94%	195,981
Las Animas	2,650	39.01%	3,710	54.62%	433	6.37%	-1,060	-15.61%	6,793
Lincoln	409	16.79%	1,892	77.67%	135	5.54%	-1,483	-60.88%	2,436
Logan	1,851	19.04%	7,282	74.90%	589	6.06%	-5,431	-55.86%	9,722
Mesa	21,729	27.98%	49,779	64.10%	6,146	7.92%	-28,050	-36.12%	77,654
Mineral	237	36.35%	344	52.76%	71	10.89%	-107	-16.41%	652
Moffat	874	13.39%	5,305	81.30%	346	5.31%	-4,431	-67.91%	6,525
Montezuma	3,973	30.90%	7,853	61.07%	1,032	8.03%	-3,880	-30.17%	12,858
Montrose	5,466	25.80%	14,382	67.88%	1,338	6.32%	-8,916	-42.08%	21,186
Morgan	3,151	26.35%	8,145	68.10%	664	5.55%	-4,994	-41.75%	11,960
Otero	2,943	34.82%	4,928	58.31%	581	6.87%	-1,985	-23.49%	8,452
Ouray	1,697	51.27%	1,351	40.82%	262	7.91%	346	10.45%	3,310
Park	3,421	32.84%	6,135	58.89%	861	8.27%	-2,714	-26.05%	10,417
Phillips	436	18.70%	1,791	76.80%	105	4.50%	-1,355	-58.10%	2,332
Pitkin	7,333	69.69%	2,550	24.23%	640	6.08%	4,783	45.46%	10,523
Prowers	1,186	23.64%	3,531	70.39%	299	5.97%	-2,345	-46.75%	5,016
Pueblo	35,875	45.62%	36,265	46.11%	6,506	8.27%	-390	-0.49%	78,646
Rio Blanco	436	12.64%	2,791	80.90%	223	6.46%	-2,355	-68.26%	3,450
Rio Grande	2,001	36.16%	3,085	55.75%	448	8.09%	-1,084	-19.59%	5,534
Routt	7,600	54.34%	5,230	37.39%	1,156	8.27%	2,370	16.95%	13,986
Saguache	1,417	49.98%	1,147	40.46%	271	9.56%	270	9.52%	2,835
San Juan	265	52.37%	215	42.49%	26	5.14%	50	9.88%	506
San Miguel	2,975	68.72%	1,033	23.86%	321	7.42%	1,942	44.86%	4,329
Sedgwick	267	19.57%	1,015	74.41%	82	6.02%	-748	-54.84%	1,364
Summit	9,557	59.09%	5,100	31.53%	1,517	9.38%	4,457	27.56%	16,174
Teller	3,603	24.94%	9,745	67.47%	1,096	7.59%	-6,142	-42.53%	14,444
Washington	296	10.83%	2,299	84.12%	138	5.05%	-2,003	-73.29%	2,733
Weld	46,519	34.35%	76,651	56.60%	12,260	9.05%	-30,132	-22.25%	135,430
Yuma	726	15.15%	3,850	80.36%	215	4.49%	-3,124	-65.21%	4,791
Total	1,338,870	48.16%	1,202,484	43.25%	238,893	8.59%	136,386	4.91%	2,780,247

Counties that flipped from Democratic to Republican

- Chaffee (largest city: Salida)
- Conejos (largest town: Manassa)
- Huerfano (largest city: Walsenburg)
- Las Animas (largest city: Trinidad)
- Pueblo (largest city: Pueblo)

==== By congressional district ====
Clinton won four of seven congressional districts, including one that elected a Republican.

District	Trump	Clinton	Representative
1st	23%	69%	Diana DeGette
2nd	35%	56%	Jared Polis
3rd	52%	40%	Scott Tipton
4th	57%	34%	Ken Buck
5th	57%	33%	Doug Lamborn
6th	41%	50%	Mike Coffman
7th	39%	51%	Ed Perlmutter

== Analysis ==
Historically, Colorado has been, following the Bryan-Wilson period, one of the most Republican states in the nation. From 1920 through 2004, Colorado voted Democratic only five times—in Franklin Roosevelt's two landslide wins in 1932 and 1936; for Harry Truman in 1948; in Lyndon Johnson's landslide win in 1964; and for Bill Clinton in 1992, with Ross Perot running substantially ahead of his national showing in the state. (Note: With the shrinkage of the Perot vote in 1996, Colorado, along with Montana, another Western state where Perot had performed exceptionally well, reverted to Dole.) Before 2016, no Republican had won without Colorado since 1908.

However, increasing urbanization in the Front Range Urban Corridor, along with the growth of minority populations (especially Hispanics) have chipped away from Republican dominance in the state: while President George W. Bush won the state in the 2004 election, it was one of the few states where Republican performance fell (with Bush's margin being nearly halved with respect to 2000), presaging Barack Obama's two Colorado wins in 2008 and 2012. Trump did improve upon previous Republican candidates in Southern Colorado, carrying three of the area's counties (Conejos County, Las Animas County and Huerfano County), a feat not accomplished by any Republican since George H. W. Bush in his decisive 1988 victory. He also carried Pueblo County by a 0.49% margin, becoming the first Republican to carry it since 1972. Southern Colorado, a blue-collar, working-class, industrial area, had once been the state's Democratic stronghold, but Democratic dominance of the region is starting to fade. Trump also did well in the traditionally Republican Western Slope, where counties such as Mesa County (home to Grand Junction) went for Trump by a 2–1 margin and the Eastern Plains, where Republicans often carried counties by 80% or more.

However, as is with the case with Nevada and other states in the American Southwest that have been experiencing increasing urbanization and a rapidly growing Hispanic population, Clinton won by running up the margins in the rapidly growing metro areas of the state, in this case principally Denver and its suburbs, as well as Boulder and Fort Collins. Hillary Clinton exceeded Obama's performance in the City and County of Denver and Boulder County. While these had long been the Democrats' main base in Colorado, Republicans had typically managed at least a quarter of the vote in the former and at least 30% in the latter when Colorado was a Republican state. In contrast, Trump managed only 18.9% and 22.0% in the two jurisdictions, respectively. Hillary Clinton did not improve on Obama's performance in Larimer County (home of Fort Collins), but she did win the county, which had voted Republican in every election from 1920 through 2004 save 1936, 1964, and 1992, and Trump posted the worst showing for a Republican in the county since 1992. Also, while rural western Colorado leans Republican, it is not nearly as strongly conservative as other rural areas, as much of the economy on the I-70 corridor is based on tourism and outdoors recreation and has a liberal environmentalist bent: rural counties with heavily tourist based economies such as Gunnison, Eagle, Routt, Pitkin and La Plata are not only some of the most Democratic rural areas in America, but often vote nearly as Democratic as large urban counties.

Similarly, even though Clinton did not improve on Obama's showing in the suburban Denver-area counties of Arapahoe and Jefferson, she nevertheless carried both, both of which had been Republican strongholds up through 2004. Trump posted some of the worst results Republicans have had in decades in this region. Trump only won 39% of the vote in Arapahoe County, which includes some of the largest Denver suburbs such as Aurora and Centennial; before Obama won this county in 2008, this county had not gone Democratic since 1964. Trump won only one county in the metro area (Douglas County—home to suburbs such as Parker, Highlands Ranch and Castle Rock), but with only 54% of the vote—one of the poorest performances in the area's most Republican county in decades. Only in Adams County, the one county in the area outside the city of Denver itself that had been a Democratic stronghold prior to 2008, did Trump manage to improve upon Romney, but even here he was barely above 40% of the vote.

Meanwhile, while Trump did win the one remaining large Republican stronghold in the state, El Paso County (home of Colorado Springs), he won with only 56% of the vote, performing worse in the county than McCain in 2008 or Dole in 1996. The confluence of Clinton's strength in Denver, Boulder, and the Denver suburbs, and Trump's weakness in El Paso County, ultimately handed the state to Clinton.

As of the 2024 election, this is the most recent election where Chaffee County and Garfield County voted Republican and the most recent election where Alamosa County voted Democratic. It is also the most recent election where Colorado was decided by single digits, as the state has trended strongly towards the Democratic Party since. Additionally, the 2016 results marked Trump's best performance in the state; he would go on to win 41.9% and 43.1% of the vote in Colorado in 2020 and 2024, respectively. This made Colorado the only state in the nation in which Trump's 2016 run was the best statewide performance out of his three runs in terms of vote share.

Colorado and Virginia have voted for the same presidential candidate in every election since 1996. However, this is the last time where Colorado would vote to the right of Virginia.

In downballot races, Mike Coffman was ultimately able to hold on to his seat in a Clinton-carried district around Arapahoe County. Democrats made big gains in this area in the State House and Senate. However, Republicans were able to gain a seat in Adams County, ultimately holding on to the State Senate.

== See also ==
- 2016 Democratic Party presidential debates and forums
- 2016 Democratic Party presidential primaries
- 2016 Republican Party presidential debates and forums
- 2016 Republican Party presidential primaries
- 2016 Colorado State Board of Regents at-large election
