= 1908 United States presidential election in Colorado =

- November 3, 1908
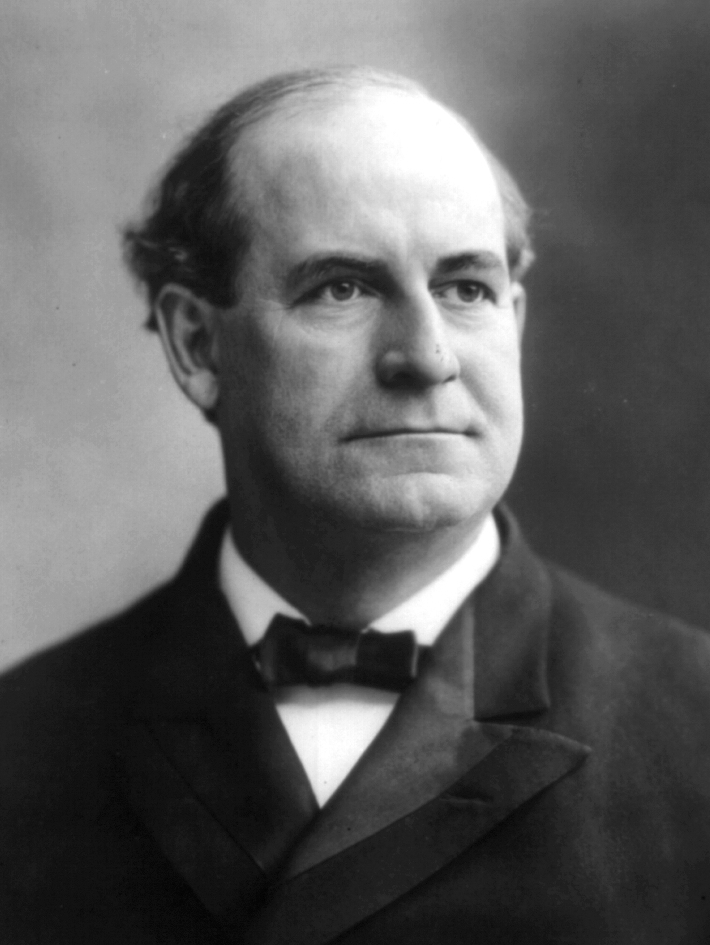

Nominee	William Jennings Bryan	William Howard Taft
Party	Democratic	Republican
Home state	Nebraska	Ohio
Running mate	John W. Kern	James S. Sherman
Electoral vote	5	0
Popular vote	126,644	123,700
Percentage	48.00%	46.88%
County results
Bryan
40–50%
50–60%
60–70%
Taft
40–50%
50–60%
60–70%
70–80%
President before election
Theodore Roosevelt
Republican
Elected President
William Howard Taft
Republican

The 1908 United States presidential election in Colorado took place on November 3, 1908, as part of the 1908 United States presidential election. Voters chose five representatives, or electors, to the Electoral College, who voted for president and vice president.

The 1908 Democratic National Convention was held in Denver between July 7 and 10.

Colorado was won by the Democratic nominee, former U.S. Representative William Jennings Bryan and his running mate John W. Kern. They defeated the Republican nominee, Secretary of War William Howard Taft and his running mate James S. Sherman. Bryan won the state by a narrow margin of 1.12%.

Bryan had previously won Colorado against William McKinley in both 1896 and 1900. Until 2016, this was the last presidential election where a Democrat carried Colorado without winning the presidency, and was the last time until 2024 that the state had backed a Democrat who lost the popular vote.

== Results ==
General Election Results
Party	Pledged to	Elector	Votes
Democratic Party	William Jennings Bryan	Thomas J. Ehrhart	126,644
Democratic Party	William Jennings Bryan	Benjamin L. Jefferson	126,530
Democratic Party	William Jennings Bryan	Dexter T. Sapp	126,519
Democratic Party	William Jennings Bryan	Samuel N. Wheeler	126,482
Democratic Party	William Jennings Bryan	Charles S. Thomas	126,418
Republican Party	William Howard Taft	J. S. Carnahan	123,700
Republican Party	William Howard Taft	C. A. Ballreich	123,693
Republican Party	William Howard Taft	John W. Springer	123,645
Republican Party	William Howard Taft	Thomas F. Walsh	123,576
Republican Party	William Howard Taft	William Story, Jr.	123,542
Socialist Party	Eugene V. Debs	Jos. A. Bray	7,974
Socialist Party	Eugene V. Debs	F. W. Bader	7,960
Socialist Party	Eugene V. Debs	Octavia Floaten	7,957
Socialist Party	Eugene V. Debs	R. C. Woodward	7,952
Socialist Party	Eugene V. Debs	W. W. Goodman	7,946
Prohibition Party	Eugene W. Chafin	W. John Calfes	5,559
Prohibition Party	Eugene W. Chafin	Thomas Greenback	5,538
Prohibition Party	Eugene W. Chafin	William J. Ritchie	5,531
Prohibition Party	Eugene W. Chafin	S. H. Schellenger	5,525
Prohibition Party	Eugene W. Chafin	A. L. Tenny	5,525
Write-in		S. H. Lasiter	1
Write-in		B. J. McGrue	1
Votes cast (Note: Based on totals for highest elector on each ticket)			263,878

=== Results by county ===
County	William Jennings Bryan Democratic		William Howard Taft Republican		Eugene Victor Debs Socialist		Eugene Wilder Chafin Prohibition		Margin	
County	%	#	%	#	%	#	%	#	%	#
Dolores	61.95%	184	23.23%	69	14.81%	44	0.00%	0	38.72%	115
Pitkin	65.94%	1,262	27.74%	531	5.59%	107	0.73%	14	38.19%	731
Mineral	67.13%	488	29.99%	218	2.34%	17	0.55%	4	37.14%	270
Montezuma	63.37%	948	29.41%	440	5.75%	86	1.47%	22	33.96%	508
Summit	64.95%	743	31.99%	366	2.62%	30	0.44%	5	32.95%	377
Ouray	64.24%	1,085	31.91%	539	3.67%	62	0.18%	3	32.33%	546
Clear Creek	65.26%	1,702	33.44%	872	0.92%	24	0.38%	10	31.83%	830
Park	61.74%	807	35.58%	465	2.45%	32	0.23%	3	26.17%	342
Gunnison	58.89%	1,481	35.35%	889	4.53%	114	1.23%	31	23.54%	592
Eagle	59.06%	828	37.16%	521	3.21%	45	0.57%	8	21.90%	307
La Plata	53.40%	2,004	36.80%	1,381	8.66%	325	1.15%	43	16.60%	623
Gilpin	55.56%	1,185	39.52%	843	3.61%	77	1.31%	28	16.03%	342
San Juan	54.51%	774	38.52%	547	6.62%	94	0.35%	5	15.99%	227
Teller	56.26%	4,192	40.45%	3,014	2.89%	215	0.40%	30	15.81%	1,178
Lake	55.41%	2,652	40.08%	1,918	4.07%	195	0.44%	21	15.34%	734
Hinsdale	53.35%	215	38.71%	156	6.95%	28	0.99%	4	14.64%	59
Chaffee	52.06%	1,679	38.23%	1,233	8.25%	266	1.46%	47	13.83%	446
Routt	54.57%	1,403	42.71%	1,098	1.71%	44	1.01%	26	11.86%	305
Garfield	52.99%	1,898	41.99%	1,504	2.79%	100	2.23%	80	11.00%	394
Rio Blanco	53.38%	466	43.99%	384	2.18%	19	0.46%	4	9.39%	82
Montrose	47.40%	1,461	38.71%	1,193	10.87%	335	3.02%	93	8.70%	268
Boulder	49.63%	5,772	41.76%	4,856	4.33%	503	4.28%	498	7.88%	916
Custer	52.21%	555	46.94%	499	0.38%	4	0.47%	5	5.27%	56
Pueblo	50.77%	8,092	46.04%	7,337	1.56%	249	1.63%	259	4.74%	755
Denver	50.44%	33,145	45.95%	30,193	2.30%	1,508	1.31%	861	4.49%	2,952
Otero	48.73%	3,542	44.47%	3,232	2.45%	178	4.35%	316	4.27%	310
Delta	46.85%	2,006	42.92%	1,838	7.96%	341	2.27%	97	3.92%	168
Yuma	48.34%	1,148	44.67%	1,061	4.88%	116	2.11%	50	3.66%	87
San Miguel	47.61%	927	45.30%	882	5.75%	112	1.34%	26	2.31%	45
Fremont	47.31%	3,146	46.15%	3,069	3.14%	209	3.40%	226	1.16%	77
Rio Grande	49.24%	1,139	48.51%	1,122	1.12%	26	1.12%	26	0.73%	17
Saguache	49.43%	817	49.06%	811	1.15%	19	0.36%	6	0.36%	6
Archuleta	46.25%	505	46.06%	503	4.49%	49	3.21%	35	0.18%	2
Jefferson	47.84%	2,583	48.58%	2,623	1.98%	107	1.59%	86	-0.74%	-40
Adams	46.46%	1,232	49.06%	1,301	2.98%	79	1.51%	40	-2.60%	-69
Mesa	41.56%	2,824	44.87%	3,049	7.37%	501	6.20%	421	-3.31%	-225
Grand	47.24%	487	51.31%	529	1.07%	11	0.39%	4	-4.07%	-42
Logan	44.94%	950	49.86%	1,054	1.09%	23	4.12%	87	-4.92%	-104
Bent	45.40%	819	50.72%	915	0.72%	13	3.16%	57	-5.32%	-96
Arapahoe	44.70%	1,340	50.50%	1,514	2.97%	89	1.83%	55	-5.80%	-174
Kiowa	44.52%	406	51.97%	474	0.88%	8	2.63%	24	-7.46%	-68
Weld	42.87%	4,650	51.05%	5,537	2.23%	242	3.84%	417	-8.18%	-887
Baca	44.53%	179	53.48%	215	1.74%	7	0.25%	1	-8.96%	-36
Larimer	41.30%	3,629	51.09%	4,489	2.73%	240	4.87%	428	-9.79%	-860
Elbert	42.23%	785	52.34%	973	3.71%	69	1.72%	32	-10.11%	-188
Douglas	44.23%	629	54.78%	779	0.49%	7	0.49%	7	-10.55%	-150
Phillips	42.89%	401	54.33%	508	0.43%	4	2.35%	22	-11.44%	-107
Kit Carson	41.39%	752	54.10%	983	2.26%	41	2.26%	41	-12.71%	-231
Conejos	43.13%	1,335	56.09%	1,736	0.39%	12	0.39%	12	-12.96%	-401
El Paso	39.79%	5,995	53.25%	8,022	3.24%	488	3.72%	560	-13.46%	-2,027
Cheyenne	40.42%	331	54.33%	445	2.56%	21	2.69%	22	-13.92%	-114
Las Animas	41.55%	4,212	56.39%	5,716	1.67%	169	0.39%	40	-14.84%	-1,504
Morgan	39.75%	1,208	55.02%	1,672	1.78%	54	3.46%	105	-15.27%	-464
Prowers	37.72%	1,015	53.14%	1,430	4.24%	114	4.91%	132	-15.42%	-415
Lincoln	40.79%	576	56.23%	794	1.35%	19	1.63%	23	-15.44%	-218
Washington	40.42%	424	57.10%	599	1.14%	12	1.33%	14	-16.68%	-175
Costilla	34.36%	559	64.60%	1,051	0.74%	12	0.31%	5	-30.24%	-492
Sedgwick	32.86%	278	64.30%	544	0.35%	3	2.48%	21	-31.44%	-266
Huerfano	19.85%	776	78.64%	3,074	1.07%	42	0.43%	17	-58.79%	-2,298
