= 1996 United States presidential election in Colorado =

- November 5, 1996

Nominee	Bob Dole	Bill Clinton	Ross Perot
Party	Republican	Democratic	Reform
Home state	Kansas	Arkansas	Texas
Running mate	Jack Kemp	Al Gore	Pat Choate
Electoral vote	8	0	0
Popular vote	691,848	671,152	99,629
Percentage	45.80%	44.43%	6.59%

Dole
40–50%
50–60%
60–70%
Clinton
40–50%
50–60%
60–70%
70–80%
President before election
Bill Clinton
Democratic
Elected President
Bill Clinton
Democratic

The 1996 United States presidential election in Colorado took place on November 7, 1996, as part of the 1996 United States presidential election. Voters chose eight representatives, or electors to the Electoral College, who voted for president and vice president.

Colorado was narrowly won by Republican Senator Bob Dole of Kansas over incumbent Democratic President Bill Clinton of Arkansas. Dole won with a plurality of 45.80% of the vote to Clinton's 44.43%, a margin of 1.37%. Billionaire businessman Ross Perot of Texas, running as the Reform Party nominee, finished third, with 6.59% of the popular vote.

Dole, from neighboring Kansas, performed most strongly in the eastern parts of Colorado bordering his home state. Clinton won Denver by 31.8%, about the same as his 31.4% margin in the city in 1992. He also won Boulder County, which had been a historically Republican county before voting for Dukakis in 1988, by a commanding margin of 17.6%, although this was down somewhat from his 24.4% margin in the county in 1992. He won the traditionally Democratic Denver-area suburban county of Adams County by 12.4%, a larger margin than Humphrey, Carter, or Dukakis had scored in the county, but, again, down from his own 14.1% margin in 1992. Clinton also retained a number of smaller counties that he had won for the Democrats for the first time since 1964--Clear Creek, Eagle, Gunnison, Routt, and Summit-and did well in the traditionally Democratic counties in the southern parts of the state.

However, aside from slightly narrowing Clinton's margins in Boulder and Adams Counties, Dole improved substantially on George H. W. Bush's 1992 margins in the large, then-traditionally Republican Denver-area suburban counties of Jefferson and Arapahoe, winning them by 5.7% and 8.9%, respectively (Bush had won them in 1992 by 0.9% and 3.1%, respectively). He also won conservative stronghold El Paso County, home to Colorado Springs, by a commanding margin of 26.8%, an improvement over Bush's 1992 margin of 23.7%. Additionally, Dole flipped Larimer County, home to Fort Collins, which had been the largest county in the state that Clinton won for the Democrats for the first time since 1964 in 1992. He also flipped smaller Garfield and La Plata Counties, and won the two counties Perot had won a plurality in 1992, Moffat and San Juan.

As of 2024, this is the last time a Democrat carried Bent, Mineral, and Otero counties.

Among white voters, 50% supported Dole, while 40% supported Clinton. 7% supported Perot.

== Results ==
1996 United States presidential election in Colorado
Party	Candidate	Running mate	Votes	Percentage	Electoral votes
Republican	Robert Dole	Jack Kemp	691,848	45.80%	8
Democratic	Bill Clinton (inc.)	Al Gore (incumbent)	671,152	44.43%	0
Reform	Ross Perot	Patrick Choate	99,629	6.59%	0
Green CO	Ralph Nader	Winona LaDuke	25,070	1.66%	0
Libertarian	Harry Browne	Jo Jorgensen	12,392	0.82%	0
American Constitution	Howard Phillips	Herbert Titus	2,813	0.19%	0
Independent	Charles Collins	Rosemary Giumarra	2,809	0.19%	0
Natural Law	Dr. John Hagelin	Dr. V. Tompkins	2,547	0.17%	0
Socialist	Mary Cal Hollis	Eric Chester	669	0.04%	0
Workers World	Monica Moorehead	Gloria La Riva	599	0.04%	0
American	Diane Templin	Gary Van Horn	557	0.04%	0
CO Prohibition	Earl Dodge	Rachel Kelly	375	0.02%	0
Socialist Workers Campaign	James Harris	Laura Garza	244	0.02%	0

=== By county ===
County	Bob Dole Republican		Bill Clinton Democratic		Ross Perot Reform		Ralph Nader Green		Harry Browne Libertarian		Various candidates Other parties		Margin		Total votes cast
County	#	%	#	%	#	%	#	%	#	%	#	%	#	%	Total votes cast
Adams	36,666	38.92%	48,314	51.28%	7,206	7.65%	869	0.92%	596	0.63%	563	0.60%	-11,648	-12.36%	94,214
Alamosa	2,038	41.23%	2,330	47.14%	437	8.84%	80	1.62%	34	0.69%	24	0.49%	-292	-5.91%	4,943
Arapahoe	82,778	50.79%	68,306	41.91%	8,476	5.20%	1,549	0.95%	1,063	0.65%	824	0.51%	14,472	8.88%	162,996
Archuleta	1,963	57.11%	997	29.01%	360	10.47%	58	1.69%	30	0.87%	29	0.84%	966	28.10%	3,437
Baca	1,321	59.53%	659	29.70%	203	9.15%	11	0.50%	9	0.41%	16	0.72%	662	29.83%	2,219
Bent	917	41.70%	1,046	47.57%	209	9.50%	13	0.59%	2	0.09%	12	0.55%	-129	-5.87%	2,199
Boulder	41,922	34.55%	63,316	52.17%	6,840	5.64%	6,772	5.58%	1,469	1.21%	1,035	0.85%	-21,394	-17.52%	121,354
Chaffee	3,052	46.85%	2,768	42.49%	538	8.26%	76	1.17%	45	0.69%	36	0.55%	284	4.36%	6,515
Cheyenne	739	62.84%	328	27.89%	91	7.74%	1	0.09%	3	0.26%	14	1.19%	411	34.95%	1,176
Clear Creek	1,746	41.97%	1,863	44.78%	365	8.77%	79	1.90%	64	1.54%	43	1.03%	-117	-2.81%	4,160
Conejos	1,149	36.08%	1,726	54.19%	245	7.69%	26	0.82%	5	0.16%	34	1.07%	-577	-18.11%	3,185
Costilla	333	20.29%	1,168	71.18%	112	6.83%	21	1.28%	5	0.30%	2	0.12%	-835	-50.89%	1,641
Crowley	680	49.60%	559	40.77%	114	8.32%	3	0.22%	8	0.58%	7	0.51%	121	8.83%	1,371
Custer	920	58.90%	412	26.38%	164	10.50%	25	1.60%	15	0.96%	26	1.66%	508	32.52%	1,562
Delta	6,047	54.48%	3,584	32.29%	1,060	9.55%	237	2.14%	79	0.71%	93	0.84%	2,463	22.19%	11,100
Denver	58,529	30.04%	120,312	61.76%	8,777	4.51%	3,423	1.76%	2,117	1.09%	1,656	0.85%	-61,783	-31.72%	194,814
Dolores	417	51.67%	276	34.20%	95	11.77%	12	1.49%	6	0.74%	1	0.12%	141	17.47%	807
Douglas	32,120	61.80%	16,232	31.23%	2,662	5.12%	415	0.80%	315	0.61%	231	0.44%	15,888	30.57%	51,975
Eagle	4,637	40.89%	5,094	44.92%	1,193	10.52%	263	2.32%	100	0.88%	54	0.48%	-457	-4.03%	11,341
El Paso	102,403	59.04%	55,822	32.19%	11,175	6.44%	1,653	0.95%	1,237	0.71%	1,151	0.66%	46,581	26.85%	173,441
Elbert	4,125	61.04%	1,894	28.03%	507	7.50%	64	0.95%	72	1.07%	96	1.42%	2,231	33.01%	6,758
Fremont	7,437	51.24%	5,344	36.82%	1,438	9.91%	131	0.90%	68	0.47%	95	0.65%	2,093	14.42%	14,513
Garfield	6,281	44.43%	5,722	40.47%	1,562	11.05%	369	2.61%	117	0.83%	87	0.62%	559	3.96%	14,138
Gilpin	682	38.12%	799	44.66%	184	10.29%	86	4.81%	29	1.62%	9	0.50%	-117	-6.54%	1,789
Grand	2,264	46.30%	2,012	41.15%	473	9.67%	65	1.33%	37	0.76%	39	0.80%	252	5.15%	4,890
Gunnison	2,230	37.04%	2,812	46.70%	570	9.47%	284	4.72%	71	1.18%	54	0.90%	-582	-9.66%	6,021
Hinsdale	289	52.83%	185	33.82%	56	10.24%	14	2.56%	2	0.37%	1	0.18%	104	19.01%	547
Huerfano	996	35.88%	1,483	53.42%	210	7.56%	62	2.23%	9	0.32%	16	0.58%	-487	-17.54%	2,776
Jackson	486	58.34%	222	26.65%	107	12.85%	9	1.08%	3	0.36%	6	0.72%	264	31.69%	833
Jefferson	101,517	48.41%	89,494	42.67%	12,967	6.18%	2,600	1.24%	1,763	0.84%	1,382	0.66%	12,023	5.74%	209,723
Kiowa	549	61.96%	246	27.77%	74	8.35%	5	0.56%	2	0.23%	10	1.13%	303	34.19%	886
Kit Carson	2,068	60.26%	1,073	31.26%	235	6.85%	12	0.35%	11	0.32%	33	0.96%	995	29.00%	3,432
La Plata	8,057	46.56%	6,509	37.61%	1,403	8.11%	1,119	6.47%	126	0.73%	92	0.53%	1,548	8.95%	17,306
Lake	728	29.53%	1,338	54.28%	274	11.12%	57	2.31%	38	1.54%	30	1.22%	-610	-24.75%	2,465
Larimer	45,935	47.14%	40,965	42.04%	6,823	7.00%	1,691	1.74%	1,050	1.08%	986	1.01%	4,970	5.10%	97,450
Las Animas	1,905	31.53%	3,611	59.76%	427	7.07%	33	0.55%	30	0.50%	36	0.60%	-1,706	-28.23%	6,042
Lincoln	1,272	57.74%	729	33.09%	164	7.44%	7	0.32%	9	0.41%	22	1.00%	543	24.65%	2,203
Logan	4,032	53.15%	2,765	36.45%	609	8.03%	39	0.51%	55	0.73%	86	1.13%	1,267	16.70%	7,586
Mesa	24,761	53.12%	17,114	36.72%	3,707	7.95%	379	0.81%	356	0.76%	296	0.64%	7,647	16.40%	46,613
Mineral	179	40.04%	192	42.95%	69	15.44%	1	0.22%	2	0.45%	4	0.89%	-13	-2.91%	447
Moffat	2,466	50.99%	1,635	33.81%	649	13.42%	26	0.54%	41	0.85%	19	0.39%	831	17.18%	4,836
Montezuma	4,175	53.31%	2,578	32.92%	827	10.56%	161	2.06%	32	0.41%	58	0.74%	1,597	20.39%	7,831
Montrose	6,730	54.99%	4,019	32.84%	1,187	9.70%	137	1.12%	83	0.68%	83	0.68%	2,711	22.15%	12,239
Morgan	4,557	52.34%	3,347	38.44%	687	7.89%	29	0.33%	26	0.30%	61	0.70%	1,210	13.90%	8,707
Otero	3,356	45.13%	3,386	45.53%	581	7.81%	31	0.42%	21	0.28%	62	0.83%	-30	-0.40%	7,437
Ouray	984	54.85%	569	31.72%	167	9.31%	52	2.90%	12	0.67%	10	0.56%	415	23.13%	1,794
Park	2,661	50.77%	1,844	35.18%	534	10.19%	87	1.66%	70	1.34%	45	0.86%	817	15.59%	5,241
Phillips	1,284	58.76%	706	32.31%	156	7.14%	2	0.09%	15	0.69%	22	1.01%	578	26.45%	2,185
Pitkin	1,969	28.19%	3,949	56.54%	535	7.66%	365	5.23%	129	1.85%	38	0.54%	-1,980	-28.35%	6,985
Prowers	2,504	53.83%	1,745	37.51%	342	7.35%	20	0.43%	19	0.41%	22	0.47%	759	16.32%	4,652
Pueblo	17,402	34.60%	28,791	57.24%	3,374	6.71%	376	0.75%	159	0.32%	199	0.40%	-11,389	-22.64%	50,301
Rio Blanco	1,697	62.50%	731	26.92%	243	8.95%	17	0.63%	14	0.52%	13	0.48%	966	35.58%	2,715
Rio Grande	2,129	49.50%	1,720	39.99%	379	8.81%	30	0.70%	14	0.33%	29	0.67%	409	9.51%	4,301
Routt	3,019	38.52%	3,660	46.70%	859	10.96%	147	1.88%	104	1.33%	48	0.61%	-641	-8.18%	7,837
Saguache	712	36.48%	969	49.64%	160	8.20%	75	3.84%	17	0.87%	19	0.97%	-257	-13.16%	1,952
San Juan	153	41.35%	133	35.95%	50	13.51%	19	5.14%	5	1.35%	10	2.70%	20	5.40%	370
San Miguel	773	28.18%	1,535	55.96%	231	8.42%	116	4.23%	49	1.79%	39	1.42%	-762	-27.78%	2,743
Sedgwick	715	52.69%	519	38.25%	101	7.44%	4	0.29%	11	0.81%	7	0.52%	196	14.44%	1,357
Summit	3,261	38.73%	3,970	47.16%	823	9.78%	188	2.23%	119	1.41%	58	0.69%	-709	-8.43%	8,419
Teller	4,458	57.93%	2,312	30.05%	707	9.19%	92	1.20%	74	0.96%	52	0.68%	2,146	27.88%	7,695
Washington	1,566	64.18%	649	26.60%	190	7.79%	6	0.25%	7	0.29%	22	0.90%	917	37.58%	2,440
Weld	26,518	49.67%	21,325	39.94%	4,347	8.14%	465	0.87%	307	0.58%	428	0.80%	5,193	9.73%	53,390
Yuma	2,589	58.72%	1,439	32.64%	319	7.24%	12	0.27%	12	0.27%	38	0.86%	1,150	26.08%	4,409
Total	691,848	45.80%	671,152	44.43%	99,629	6.59%	25,070	1.66%	12,392	0.82%	10,613	0.70%	20,696	1.37%	1,510,704

==== Counties that flipped from Democratic to Republican ====
- Garfield
- La Plata
- Larimer

==== Counties that flipped from Independent to Republican ====
- Moffat
- San Juan

=== By congressional district ===
Dole won four of six congressional districts.

District	Dole	Clinton	Perot	Representative
1st	31%	61%	5%	Pat Schroeder (104th Congress)
1st	31%	61%	5%	Diana DeGette (105th Congress)
2nd	40%	49%	6%	David Skaggs
3rd	45%	43%	9%	Scott McInnis
4th	49%	41%	7%	Wayne Allard (104th Congress)
4th	49%	41%	7%	Bob Schaffer (105th Congress)
5th	59%	33%	6%	Joel Hefley
6th	49%	43%	6%	Daniel Schaefer

== Analysis ==
Dole's slim victory made Colorado one of three states (along with Georgia and Montana) to flip against Clinton from 1992 to 1996, even as Clinton increased his national margin of victory by nearly 3 points. Until the 2024 presidential election, this was the last time since 1960 that Colorado and Nevada voted for different candidates, and the last time to date that Colorado has backed a losing Republican candidate.

This is also the last election in which Mineral County, Otero County, and Bent County voted for a Democratic presidential candidate. Colorado was one of only two states which Bill Clinton lost in either of his elections but his wife Hillary Clinton won in 2016; the other being Virginia. Clinton is the only Democratic president to win state only once and then win re-election without it (although FDR lost Colorado in his third and fourth elections, after winning the state in his first two). This marks the last time that Colorado voted against an incumbent president who was re-elected.

Dole's victory was the first of three consecutive Republican victories in the state, as Colorado would not vote Democratic again until Barack Obama in 2008, after which it became a Democratic stronghold.
