= Approval Voting Party =

American political party

- Chairperson: Frank Atwood
- Presidential nominee: Blake Huber
- Vice-presidential nominee: Andrea Denault
- Founded: 2016; 10 years ago
- Registered voters (October 1, 2021): 3,962
- Ideology: Electoral reform
- Political position: Single issue

Website
- approvalvotingparty.com

The Approval Voting Party (AVP) is a single-issue American political party dedicated to implementing approval voting in the United States. In 2019, the party became recognized as a minor party in Colorado.

== History ==
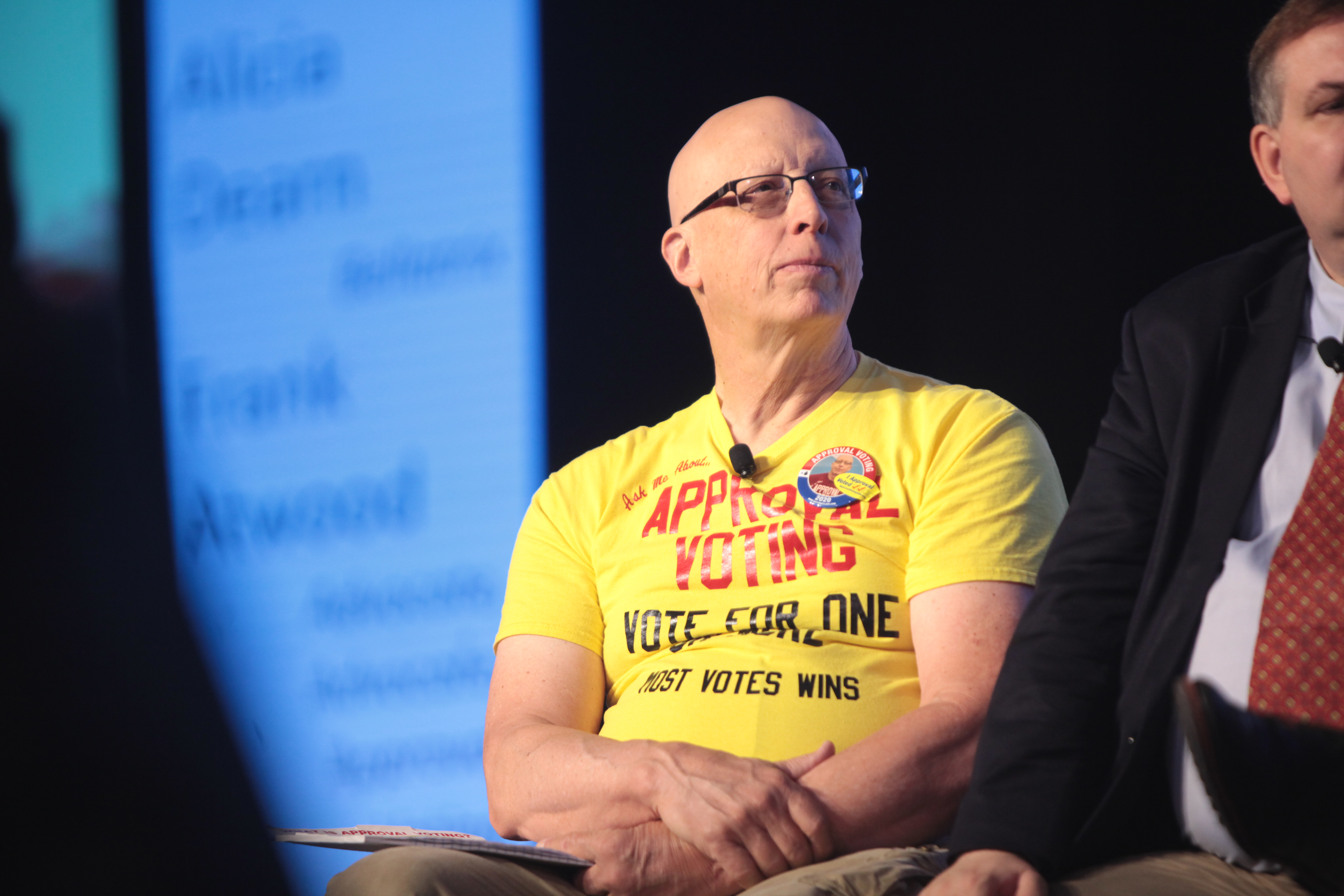
Party chairman Frank Atwood in 2016

Approval Voting Party ballot access during the 2020 United States presidential election

The Approval Voting Party was co-founded by Blake Huber and Frank Atwood. The party ran Huber for the position of Colorado Secretary of State in 2018. Huber received 13,258 votes, 0.5 percent of all cast, behind the Democratic, Republican, and Constitution Party nominees.

In October 2019, the party received minor party status in Colorado after surpassing 1,000 registered members.

In 2019, Atwood, a member of the Littleton, Colorado election commission, attempted to pass a measure that would have implemented approval voting in non-partisan municipal elections within that town. The election commission voted to send the measure to the city council; however, the city council voted 4-3 against the measure.

=== Presidential elections ===
==== 2016 presidential campaign ====
During the 2016 presidential election, Frank Atwood served as the AVP's presidential nominee and Blake Huber as its vice-presidential nominee. Atwood and Huber only appeared on the ballot in Colorado, receiving 337 votes.

==== 2020 presidential campaign ====
On March 8, 2020, four delegates voted to give Huber the presidential nomination and Atwood the vice-presidential nomination at a meeting in Sheridan, Colorado. Huber and Atwood were on the ballot in Vermont and Colorado, receiving 409 votes.

==== 2024 presidential campaign ====
Blake Huber was the AVP's presidential nominee and Andrea Denault the vice-presidential nominee. Huber and Denault were on the ballot in Colorado, receiving 2,196 votes.

== Colorado election results ==
=== State ===
Year	Seat	Candidate	Votes	%	Place	Ref.
2026	U.S. Senate	Christopher Baum	TBD			
2026	Governor / Lt. Gov	Erik Underwood / Frank Atwood	TBD			
2026	Treasurer	Marilee Langner Sturgis	TBD			
2024	Board of Regents at-large	Thomas Reasoner	29,232	0.68%	4th of 6	
2024	U.S. House 1	Daniel Lutz	2,351	0.68%	4th of 6	
2024	U.S. House 2	Jan Kok	2,349	1.00%	4th of 4	
2024	U.S. House 4	Frank Atwood	6,233	1.39%	4th of 5	
2024	U.S. House 6	Travis Nicks	4,004	1.16%	4th of 5	
2024	U.S. House 8	Chris Baum	5,741	1.72%	3rd of 5	
2024 sp	U.S. House 4 sp	Frank Atwood	3,225	1.88%	4th of 4	
2022	U.S. Senate	Frank Atwood	11,354	0.45%	5th of 9	
2022	Secretary of State	Jan Kok	4,591	0.18%	6th of 6	
2020	U.S. House 1	Jan Kok	1,441	0.32%	5th of 5	
2020	Board of Education 1	Zachary Laddison	2,405	0.54%	4th of 4	
2018	Secretary of State	Blake Huber	13,258	0.53%	4th of 4	

== See also ==
- The Center for Election Science
