= 1896 United States presidential election in Colorado =

- November 3, 1896

Nominee	William Jennings Bryan	William McKinley
Party	Democratic	Republican
Alliance	Populist
Home state	Nebraska	Ohio
Running mate	Arthur Sewall	Garret Hobart
Electoral vote	4	0
Popular vote	161,269	26,279
Percentage	84.96%	13.84%
County results
Bryan
50–60%
60–70%
70–80%
80–90%
90–100%
McKinley
50–60%
President before election
Grover Cleveland
Democratic
Elected President
William McKinley
Republican

The 1896 United States presidential election in Colorado took place on November 3, 1896. All contemporary 45 states were part of the 1896 United States presidential election. Voters chose four electors to the Electoral College, which selected the president and vice president.

In its early days as a state, Colorado had like the Plains States to its east been solidly Republican. However, with crises emerging in its agricultural sector from low wheat prices and a severe drought in 1888 and 1889, and the state's underdevelopment leading to resentment of the Northeast, the new Populist Party was able to largely take over the state's politics in the early 1890s. Aided by fusion with the minority Democratic Party and strong support for free silver in this state which produced over half of all American silver, the Populist Party under James B. Weaver in 1892 carried the state's presidential electoral votes and won both its congressional seats. After the Republicans gained a 130-seat majority in the House of Representatives following the 1894 elections, five dissident Republicans from the Mountain States who supported free silver jointed together as the “Silver Republicans” (Note: Henry M. Teller of Colorado, Fred T. Dubois of Idaho, Frank J. Cannon of Utah and Thomas H. Carter and Lee Mantle of Montana.) They supported nominating Centennial State Senator Henry M. Teller for president at first, but ultimately this was viewed as impractical and the Silver Republicans fused with a Democratic/Populist ticket headed by William Jennings Bryan.

Bryan's support for free silver against the existing gold standard supported by Republican nominee William McKinley ensured he had virtually unanimous support from Colorado's silver-dependent business elite. Once a fusion between Democrats, Populists, and Silver Republicans was fully finalized, there was no campaigning in Colorado as all polls showed Bryan would carry the state very easily. Bryan, in the end, carried Colorado by a margin of 71.12%, by over twenty percent the best performance by any presidential candidate in the history of the state. (Note: The second-best Colorado presidential election performance was by Herbert Hoover in 1928, when, aided by powerful anti-Catholic sentiment against Al Smith in the High Plains, he won 64.72 percent of the vote.) This would also prove to be the best result for any post-Civil War presidential candidate in a non-Southern state. Bryan carried all but two of Colorado's counties, and won nineteen with over ninety percent of the vote, with McKinley retaining significant support only on the eastern High Plains, where the power of the silver magnates was much less.

With 84.95% of the popular vote, Colorado would prove to be Bryan's third strongest state in the 1896 presidential election only after Mississippi and South Carolina.

Bryan would win Colorado against William McKinley again in 1900 and would later also win the state against William Howard Taft in 1908, making the state one of just two western states Bryan would carry in all three of his runs (the other being Nevada). This is the first election where the Republican candidate won without the state.

== Results ==
General Election Results
Party	Pledged to	Elector	Votes
Democratic Party	William Jennings Bryan	George W. Thatcher	158,880
Democratic Party	William Jennings Bryan	Ebenezer T. Wells	158,729
Democratic Party	William Jennings Bryan	Allen T. Gunnell	158,674
Democratic Party	William Jennings Bryan	Thomas M. Patterson	158,616
Republican Party	William McKinley	Joseph F. Humphrey	26,279
Republican Party	William McKinley	William A. Hamill	26,271
Republican Party	William McKinley	Frederick Walsen	26,268
Republican Party	William McKinley	Charles C. Goodale	26,243
National-People's Party	William Jennings Bryan	Benair C. Sawyer	2,389
National-People's Party	William Jennings Bryan	Louise M. Graves	2,382
National-People's Party	William Jennings Bryan	Horace Y. Nichols	2,366
National-People's Party	William Jennings Bryan	George X. Young	2,362
Prohibition Party	Joshua Levering	John F. White	1,724
Prohibition Party	Joshua Levering	Charlotte S. McKinney	1,718
Prohibition Party	Joshua Levering	Ella W. Chambers	1,717
Prohibition Party	Joshua Levering	David R. Hunter	1,714
National Party	Charles E. Bentley	James Stewart	386
National Party	Charles E. Bentley	Samuel P. Crouch	381
National Party	Charles E. Bentley	Mary O. Mott	376
National Party	Charles E. Bentley	Jacob Saylor	366
Socialist Labor Party	Charles H. Matchett	Adolf F. Filberg	160
Socialist Labor Party	Charles H. Matchett	John P. Meyer	160
Socialist Labor Party	Charles H. Matchett	Henry Warnecke	159
Socialist Labor Party	Charles H. Matchett	Otto H. Viergutz	159
National Democratic Party	John M. Palmer	Edgar W. Conable	1
National Democratic Party	John M. Palmer	James R. Pershing	1
National Democratic Party	John M. Palmer	Francis B. Hill	1
National Democratic Party	John M. Palmer	Philip A. Wieting	1
Votes cast (Note: Based on totals for highest elector on each ticket)			189,819

=== Results by county ===
County	William Jennings Bryan Democratic		William McKinley Republican		Joshua Levering Prohibition		Various candidates Other parties		Margin	
County	%	#	%	#	%	#	%	#	%	#
Pitkin	98.97%	3,763	0.71%	27	0.05%	2	0.26%	10	98.26%	3,736
San Juan	98.71%	1,535	1.09%	17	0.13%	2	0.06%	1	97.62%	1,518
Mineral	98.30%	808	1.34%	11	0.24%	2	0.12%	1	96.96%	797
Dolores	98.11%	676	1.60%	11	0.15%	1	0.15%	1	96.52%	665
Ouray	98.08%	2,192	1.70%	38	0.13%	3	0.09%	2	96.38%	2,154
Summit	97.64%	1,243	2.20%	28	0.16%	2	0.00%	0	95.44%	1,215
Clear Creek	96.84%	3,345	2.92%	101	0.23%	8	0.00%	0	93.92%	3,244
Hinsdale	96.40%	697	2.63%	19	0.55%	4	0.41%	3	93.78%	678
La Plata	96.57%	2,729	3.22%	91	0.18%	5	0.04%	1	93.35%	2,638
Montezuma	96.13%	845	3.75%	33	0.11%	1	0.00%	0	92.38%	812
Lake	96.04%	6,518	3.76%	255	0.16%	11	0.04%	3	92.28%	6,263
Conejos	95.98%	2,388	3.86%	96	0.04%	1	0.12%	3	92.12%	2,292
San Miguel	95.70%	2,136	3.90%	87	0.18%	4	0.22%	5	91.80%	2,049
Eagle	95.04%	1,149	4.38%	53	0.41%	5	0.17%	2	90.65%	1,096
Grand	94.72%	251	4.53%	12	0.38%	1	0.38%	1	90.19%	239
Chaffee	94.35%	2,606	5.10%	141	0.25%	7	0.29%	8	89.25%	2,465
Gunnison	93.29%	2,268	6.17%	150	0.25%	6	0.29%	7	87.12%	2,118
Garfield	90.81%	2,065	7.61%	173	1.14%	26	0.44%	10	83.20%	1,892
Delta	89.85%	1,603	7.79%	139	2.13%	38	0.22%	4	82.06%	1,464
Park	90.81%	1,562	8.78%	151	0.35%	6	0.06%	1	82.03%	1,411
Jefferson	88.99%	3,176	8.41%	300	1.79%	64	0.81%	29	80.58%	2,876
Gilpin	89.76%	2,532	9.43%	266	0.64%	18	0.18%	5	80.33%	2,266
Routt	89.62%	1,105	9.89%	122	0.16%	2	0.32%	4	79.72%	983
Rio Blanco	89.55%	454	10.26%	52	0.20%	1	0.00%	0	79.29%	402
Rio Grande	87.71%	1,428	10.81%	176	1.29%	21	0.18%	3	76.90%	1,252
Montrose	86.19%	1,348	11.64%	182	0.96%	15	1.21%	19	74.55%	1,166
Arapahoe	86.54%	42,521	12.33%	6,057	0.76%	374	0.37%	182	74.21%	36,464
Saguache	86.45%	1,155	13.17%	176	0.07%	1	0.30%	4	73.28%	979
Fremont	85.07%	4,267	12.78%	641	2.01%	101	0.14%	7	72.29%	3,626
Pueblo	85.39%	8,373	13.44%	1,318	0.55%	54	0.62%	61	71.95%	7,055
Douglas	85.24%	1,051	13.95%	172	0.65%	8	0.16%	2	71.29%	879
Custer	85.07%	986	14.41%	167	0.35%	4	0.17%	2	70.66%	819
Boulder	83.87%	6,046	14.33%	1,033	1.62%	117	0.18%	13	69.54%	5,013
Weld	82.13%	4,620	15.54%	874	1.69%	95	0.64%	36	66.60%	3,746
Las Animas	82.50%	5,497	16.90%	1,126	0.53%	35	0.08%	5	65.60%	4,371
Mesa	80.04%	2,374	15.81%	469	3.14%	93	1.01%	30	64.23%	1,905
Larimer	78.83%	3,195	18.11%	734	2.79%	113	0.27%	11	60.72%	2,461
Otero	79.12%	2,167	19.13%	524	1.46%	40	0.29%	8	59.99%	1,643
Bent	73.88%	591	24.63%	197	1.38%	11	0.13%	1	49.25%	394
Morgan	72.88%	602	25.54%	211	0.97%	8	0.61%	5	47.34%	391
Costilla	73.36%	1,052	26.08%	374	0.42%	6	0.14%	2	47.28%	678
El Paso	72.84%	17,672	25.75%	6,248	1.22%	296	0.18%	44	47.09%	11,424
Archuleta	73.18%	393	26.26%	141	0.56%	3	0.00%	0	46.93%	252
Elbert	72.70%	751	26.52%	274	0.58%	6	0.19%	2	46.18%	477
Logan	69.23%	603	26.52%	231	3.67%	32	0.57%	5	42.71%	372
Yuma	69.83%	442	28.44%	180	1.74%	11	0.00%	0	41.39%	262
Huerfano	67.45%	1,929	32.48%	929	0.07%	2	0.00%	0	34.97%	1,000
Prowers	63.16%	552	34.78%	304	1.72%	15	0.34%	3	28.38%	248
Lincoln	62.69%	210	36.72%	123	0.30%	1	0.30%	1	25.97%	87
Phillips	62.78%	334	36.84%	196	0.38%	2	0.00%	0	25.94%	138
Sedgwick	60.85%	216	36.62%	130	1.97%	7	0.56%	2	24.23%	86
Cheyenne	54.45%	104	45.55%	87	0.00%	0	0.00%	0	8.90%	17
Kiowa	53.45%	155	45.86%	133	0.69%	2	0.00%	0	7.59%	22
Baca	51.53%	135	47.71%	125	0.76%	2	0.00%	0	3.82%	10
Kit Carson	46.45%	229	51.12%	252	1.62%	8	0.81%	4	-4.67%	-23
Washington	42.86%	177	53.75%	222	3.39%	14	0.00%	0	-10.90%	-45
