= 2024 Colorado Proposition 131 =

Ballot measure in Colorado regarding ranked-choice voting

Proposition 131
- November 5, 2024
- Establishing All‑Candidate Primary and Ranked Choice Voting General Elections

Results
Choice	Votes	%
Yes	1,385,060	46.47%
No	1,595,256	53.53%
Total votes	2,980,316	100.00%
County results
For
50–60%
Against
70–80%
60–70%
50–60%

2024 Colorado Proposition 131 was a proposed ballot measure that appeared before voters in Colorado during the 2024 general election. The citizen initiated proposition would have replaced Colorado's partisan primaries with non-partisan blanket primaries and would have implemented ranked-choice (instant-runoff) voting for most statewide and state legislative general elections in which the top four candidates in the primary would have qualified for the general election ballot.

== Background ==
Currently, Colorado uses partisan primaries to select who appears on general election ballots and a first past the post voting system like most US states. Had Proposition 131 passed, Colorado would have switched to a system of blanket primaries and ranked choice general elections. Similar systems were adopted by Maine in 2016 and Alaska in 2020. The proposition was initiated by citizen petition, largely funded by health care executive Kent Thiry. Similar proposals were on the ballot in Idaho, Montana, Nevada, and Oregon, funded by a network of donors of which Thiry is a part.

In 2024, Governor Jared Polis signed into law Senate Bill 210 which heightened requirements for the adoption of ranked choice voting in Colorado. Specifically, the law requires that at least 12 communities of various required sizes adopt ranked choice voting at a local level before it can be implemented statewide. This made it unclear how quickly ranked choice voting would have been implemented in Colorado had Proposition 131 passed. However, Polis had committed to ensuring ranked choice voting was put into effect by the 2028 election if voters approved the proposition. In addition, Polis endorsed the measure.

== Contents ==
The proposition appeared on the ballot as follows:

Shall there be a change to the Colorado Revised Statutes creating new election processes for certain federal and state offices, and, in connection therewith, creating a new all-candidate primary election for U.S. Senate, U.S. House of Representatives, governor, attorney general, secretary of state, treasurer, CU board of regents, state board of education, and the Colorado state legislature; allowing voters to vote for any one candidate per office, regardless of the voter’s or candidate’s political party affiliation; providing that the four candidates for each office who receive the most votes advance to the general election; and in the general election, allowing voters to rank candidates for each office on their ballot, adopting a process for how the ranked votes are tallied, and determining the winner to be the candidate with the highest number of votes in the final tally?

== Campaigns ==
=== Support ===
The campaign in support of Proposition 131 was led by Colorado Voters First. Additionally, Colorado's official voter guide offered the arguments in support of Proposition 131 that a blanket primary system would create an equal opportunity for everyone to participate in primary elections, increase voter turnout in primaries, and make general elections more competitive. It also offered that ranking candidates in order of preference in general elections gives voters more choices, minimizes the spoiler effect, and results in outcomes that better reflect the will of the voters.

'Yes'

Federal officials

- John Hickenlooper, US Senator

State officials

- Jared Polis, Governor of Colorado
- Bernie Buescher, Former Secretary of State of Colorado

State senators

- Don Coram

State representatives

- Lindsey Daugherty
- Matt Soper

Local politicians

- James Baldwin, Otero County Commissioner
- Anne Brown, San Miguel County Commissioner
- Cody Davis, Mesa County Commissioner
- Mitch Houston, Clear Creek County Commissioner
- Austin Lashley, San Juan County Commissioner
- Steve O’Dorisio, Adams County Commissioner
- Matt Sherr, Eagle County Commissioner
- Lance Waring, San Miguel County Commissioner
- Jeni Arndt, Mayor of Fort Collins
- Ian Billick, Mayor of Crested Butte
- John Clarke, Mayor of Ridgway
- Guyleen Castriota, Mayor of Broomfield
- Mike Johnston, Mayor of Denver
- Rachel Medina, Mayor of Cortez
- Shawn Fallon, Mayor Pro-Tempore of Norwood
- Jason MacMillan, Mayor Pro-Tempore of Crested Butte
- Brian Wong, Mayor Pro-Tempore of Lafayette
- Matt Benjamin, Boulder City Councilor
- Charles Dukes, Commerce City City Councilor
- Nancy Henjum, Colorado Springs City Councilor
- David Leinweber, Colorado Springs City Councilor
- Dakotah McGinlay, Steamboat Springs City Councilor
- Alisa Pappenfort, Salida City Councilor
- Steve Sundberg, Aurora City Councilor
- Ann Taddeo, Brighton City Councilor
- Martin Wayles, Salida City Councilor
- Dustin Zvonek, Aurora City Councilor
- Geoff Grimmer, Eagle Town Councilor

Newspapers

- The Durango Herald

Organizations

- American Enterprise Institute
- Bipartisan Policy Center
- League of Women Voters

=== Opposition ===
There were two main groups leading opposition against Proposition 131: Voters Rights Colorado and First Choice Counts. Colorado's official voter guide also offered the arguments against Proposition 131 that the measure will make elections more expensive, confuse voters, and weaken faith in the outcomes of Colorado elections. Additionally, it offered that political parties should have separate primaries, with unaffiliated voters already being able to participate in Colorado's primary system, and a blanket primary system would result in more expensive primary campaigns.

'No'

Federal officials

- Michael Bennet, US Senator
- Lauren Boebert, U.S. representative from CO-03
- Diana DeGette, U.S. representative from CO-01

State senators

- Steve Fenberg
- Julie Gonzales
- Tom Sullivan
- Faith Winter

State representatives

- Monica Duran
- Lorena Garcia
- Javier Mabrey
- Emily Sirota
- Steven Woodrow

Local officials

- Tamara Pogue, Summit County commissioner
- Kristen Stephens, Larimer County commissioner

Organizations

- Colorado Democratic Party
- Colorado Republican Party

== Polling ==
Poll source	Date(s) administered	Sample size (Note: Key: A – all adults RV – registered voters LV – likely voters V – unclear)	Margin of error	For	Against	Undecided
YouGov	October 18–30, 2024	754 (LV)	± 4.5%	45%	33%	22%
Keating Research	August 28 – September 1, 2024	400 (LV)	± 3.5%	56%	21%	23%

== Results ==
Proposition 131 required a simple majority to pass. It failed, only receiving 46% of the vote.

Proposition 131
Choice	Votes	%
For	1,385,060	46.47
Against	1,595,256	53.53
Total	2,980,316	100.00

=== Results by county ===
County	For		Against		Margin		Total votes cast
County	#	%	#	%	#	%	Total votes cast
Adams	107,637	50.28%	106,454	49.72%	1,183	0.55%	214,091
Alamosa	3,130	44.67%	3,877	55.33%	-747	-10.66%	7,007
Arapahoe	144,974	47.83%	158,100	52.17%	-13,126	-4.33%	303,074
Archuleta	3,809	43.76%	4,895	56.24%	-1,086	-12.48%	8,704
Baca	526	27.93%	1,357	72.07%	-831	-44.13%	1,883
Bent	837	40.03%	1,254	59.97%	-417	-19.94%	2,091
Boulder	87,425	48.02%	94,626	51.98%	-7,201	-3.96%	182,051
Broomfield	20,985	48.21%	22,541	51.79%	-1,556	-3.57%	43,526
Chaffee	6,308	46.46%	7,268	53.54%	-960	-7.07%	13,576
Cheyenne	251	24.80%	761	75.20%	-510	-50.40%	1,012
Clear Creek	2,773	49.19%	2,864	50.81%	-91	-1.61%	5,637
Conejos	1,423	36.64%	2,461	63.36%	-1,038	-26.73%	3,884
Costilla	908	47.74%	994	52.26%	-86	-4.52%	1,902
Crowley	609	36.95%	1,039	63.05%	-430	-26.09%	1,648
Custer	1,304	35.39%	2,381	64.61%	-1,077	-29.23%	3,685
Delta	7,128	38.19%	11,536	61.81%	-4,408	-23.62%	18,664
Denver	180,060	53.81%	154,578	46.19%	25,482	7.61%	334,638
Dolores	446	33.74%	876	66.26%	-430	-32.53%	1,322
Douglas	92,669	40.57%	135,721	59.43%	-43,052	-18.85%	228,390
Eagle	12,544	49.19%	12,958	50.81%	-414	-1.62%	25,502
El Paso	163,032	45.35%	196,484	54.65%	-33,452	-9.30%	359,516
Elbert	6,708	34.50%	12,738	65.50%	-6,030	-31.01%	19,446
Fremont	10,105	42.01%	13,949	57.99%	-3,844	-15.98%	24,054
Garfield	12,385	43.47%	16,103	56.53%	-3,718	-13.05%	28,488
Gilpin	1,831	46.67%	2,092	53.33%	-261	-6.65%	3,923
Grand	4,198	44.88%	5,155	55.12%	-957	-10.23%	9,353
Gunnison	4,939	48.82%	5,177	51.18%	-238	-2.35%	10,116
Hinsdale	234	40.84%	339	59.16%	-105	-18.32%	573
Huerfano	1,835	43.66%	2,368	56.34%	-533	-12.68%	4,203
Jackson	280	35.76%	503	64.24%	-223	-28.48%	783
Jefferson	160,907	47.17%	180,181	52.83%	-19,274	-5.65%	341,088
Kiowa	204	25.19%	606	74.81%	-402	-49.63%	810
Kit Carson	1,054	30.21%	2,435	69.79%	-1,381	-39.58%	3,489
La Plata	15,396	46.86%	17,457	53.14%	-2,061	-6.27%	32,853
Lake	1,899	52.49%	1,719	47.51%	180	4.98%	3,618
Larimer	101,724	48.40%	108,430	51.60%	-6,706	-3.19%	210,154
Las Animas	3,259	44.32%	4,094	55.68%	-835	-11.36%	7,353
Lincoln	792	31.95%	1,687	68.05%	-895	-36.10%	2,479
Logan	3,275	34.10%	6,330	65.90%	-3,055	-31.81%	9,605
Mesa	35,790	41.77%	49,886	58.23%	-14,096	-16.45%	85,676
Mineral	311	43.50%	404	56.50%	-93	-13.01%	715
Moffat	2,145	34.73%	4,031	65.27%	-1,886	-30.54%	6,176
Montezuma	5,463	38.67%	8,666	61.33%	-3,203	-22.67%	14,129
Montrose	8,310	34.57%	15,725	65.43%	-7,415	-30.85%	24,035
Morgan	4,819	37.71%	7,959	62.29%	-3,140	-24.57%	12,778
Otero	3,342	39.06%	5,214	60.94%	-1,872	-21.88%	8,556
Ouray	1,714	44.24%	2,160	55.76%	-446	-11.51%	3,874
Park	4,859	42.15%	6,668	57.85%	-1,809	-15.69%	11,527
Phillips	669	30.83%	1,501	69.17%	-832	-38.34%	2,170
Pitkin	4,475	44.87%	5,499	55.13%	-1,024	-10.27%	9,974
Prowers	1,630	33.52%	3,233	66.48%	-1,603	-32.96%	4,863
Pueblo	35,967	44.38%	45,074	55.62%	-9,107	-11.24%	81,041
Rio Blanco	1,087	31.16%	2,401	68.84%	-1,314	-37.67%	3,488
Rio Grande	2,483	41.80%	3,457	58.20%	-974	-16.40%	5,940
Routt	7,456	49.24%	7,687	50.76%	-231	-1.53%	15,143
Saguache	1,487	46.98%	1,678	53.02%	-191	-6.03%	3,165
San Juan	270	51.43%	255	48.57%	15	2.86%	525
San Miguel	2,201	51.40%	2,081	48.60%	120	2.80%	4,282
Sedgwick	419	33.57%	829	66.43%	-410	-32.85%	1,248
Summit	8,275	51.70%	7,732	48.30%	543	3.39%	16,007
Teller	5,863	37.85%	9,628	62.15%	-3,765	-24.30%	15,491
Washington	752	28.03%	1,931	71.97%	-1,179	-43.94%	2,683
Weld	74,119	44.07%	94,084	55.93%	-19,965	-11.87%	168,203
Yuma	1,351	30.46%	3,085	69.54%	-1,734	-39.09%	4,436
Total	1,385,060	46.47%	1,595,256	53.53%	-210,196	-7.05%	2,980,316

== See also ==
- 2016 Maine Question 5
- 2020 Alaska Measure 2
- 2024 Idaho Open Primary initiative
- 2024 United States ballot measures
- Ranked-choice voting in the United States
