= 1900 United States presidential election in Colorado =

- November 6, 1900

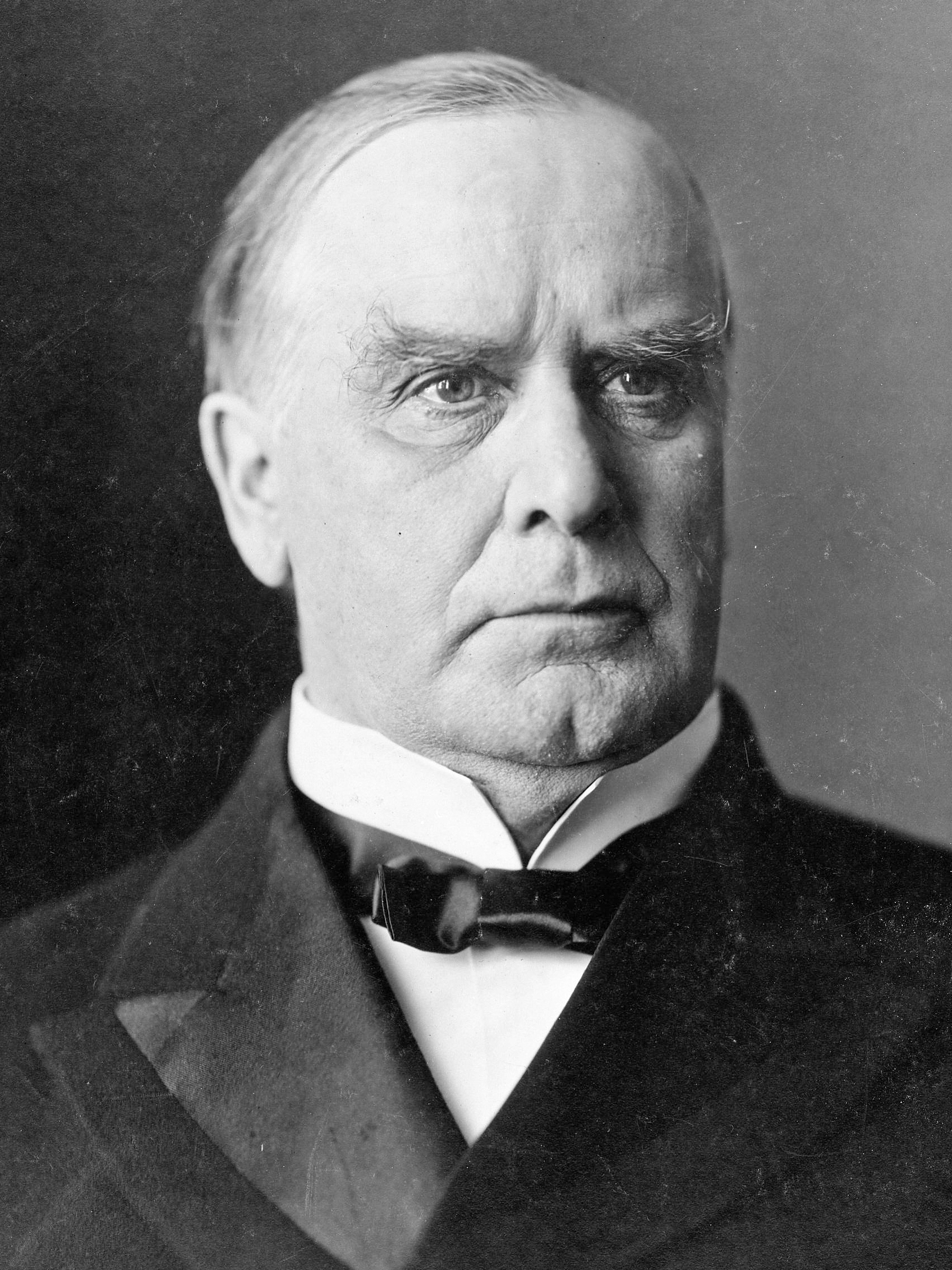
Nominee	William Jennings Bryan	William McKinley
Party	Democratic	Republican
Home state	Nebraska	Ohio
Running mate	Adlai Stevenson I	Theodore Roosevelt
Electoral vote	4	0
Popular vote	122,733	93,072
Percentage	55.43%	42.04%
County results
Bryan
40–50%
50–60%
60–70%
70–80%
80–90%
McKinley
40–50%
50–60%
60–70%
President before election
William McKinley
Republican
Elected President
William McKinley
Republican

The 1900 United States presidential election in Colorado took place on November 6, 1900. All contemporary 45 states were part of the 1900 United States presidential election. Voters chose four electors to the Electoral College, which selected the president and vice president.

In its early days as a state, Colorado had, like the Plains States to its east, been solidly Republican. However, with crises emerging in its agricultural sector from low wheat prices and a severe drought in 1888 and 1889, and the state's underdevelopment leading to resentment of the Northeast, the new Populist Party was able to largely take over the state's politics in the early 1890s. Aided by fusion with the minority Democratic Party and strong support for free silver in this state which produced over half of all American silver, the Populist Party under James B. Weaver in 1892 carried the state's presidential electoral votes and won both its congressional seats. After the Republicans gained a 130-seat majority in the House of Representatives following the 1894 elections, five dissident Republicans from the Mountain States who supported free silver jointed together as the “Silver Republicans” (Note: Henry M. Teller of Colorado, Fred T. Dubois of Idaho, Frank J. Cannon of Utah and Thomas H. Carter and Lee Mantle of Montana.) They supported nominating Centennial State Senator Henry M. Teller for president at first, but ultimately this was viewed as impractical and the Silver Republicans fused with a Democratic/Populist ticket headed by William Jennings Bryan, who ultimately won Colorado in 1896 by a landslide margin of over six-and-a-half-to-one versus William McKinley.

Following the election, the Populist majority in Colorado largely faded after the ensuing return to prosperity. However, Colorado and other Mountain States became opposed to the Philippine–American War, which they viewed as an imperialist land grab, which maintained substantial support for Bryan although free silver had largely disappeared as an important issue except within the silver-mining industry.

One week before the election, the GOP had given up trying to carry Colorado, and ultimately Bryan won the state by 13.39 percentage points, which was nonetheless only two-elevenths of his 1896 margin. Bryan had previously won Colorado against William McKinley four years earlier and would later also win the state against William Howard Taft in 1908. Since Colorado's statehood, this marks the only time that a president won two consecutive terms in office without ever winning Colorado.

== Results ==
General Election Results
Party	Pledged to	Elector	Votes
Democratic Party	William Jennings Bryan	Benjamin H. Eaton	122,733
Democratic Party	William Jennings Bryan	Thomas M. Patterson	122,334
Democratic Party	William Jennings Bryan	Charles J. Hughes, Jr.	122,309
Democratic Party	William Jennings Bryan	Jacob H. Robeson	122,141
Republican Party	William McKinley	Irving Howbert	93,072
Republican Party	William McKinley	Simon Guggenheim	93,039
Republican Party	William McKinley	Thomas S. McMurray	92,993
Republican Party	William McKinley	Thomas F. Walsh	92,975
Prohibition Party	John G. Woolley	Charles J. Clayton	3,790
Prohibition Party	John G. Woolley	Ralph Hilton	3,754
Prohibition Party	John G. Woolley	Adam Miller	3,731
Prohibition Party	John G. Woolley	John Trew	3,714
Socialist Labor Party	Joseph F. Malloney	George Bauer	714
Socialist Labor Party	Joseph F. Malloney	Charles Rice	700
Socialist Labor Party	Joseph F. Malloney	James Dalby	686
Social Democratic Party	Eugene V. Debs	John H. Morrow	684
Social Democratic Party	Eugene V. Debs	William M. Ash	654
Socialist Labor Party	Joseph F. Malloney	J. M. Sellers	630
Social Democratic Party	Eugene V. Debs	J. Everett Seeley	628
People's Party	Wharton Barker	Davis H. Waite	389
People's Party	Wharton Barker	John D. Kleckner	333
People's Party	Wharton Barker	Thomas M. Marshall	321
People's Party	Wharton Barker	William S. Neal	308
Write-in		W. J. Palmer	26
Votes cast (Note: Based on totals for highest elector on each ticket)			221,408

=== Results by county ===
County	William Jennings Bryan Democratic		William McKinley Republican		John Granville Woolley Prohibition		Various candidates Other parties		Margin	
County	%	#	%	#	%	#	%	#	%	#
Dolores	84.60%	412	13.55%	66	0.62%	3	1.23%	6	71.05%	346
Pitkin	82.71%	2,305	16.43%	458	0.22%	6	0.65%	18	66.27%	1,847
Mineral	76.50%	700	22.73%	208	0.44%	4	0.33%	3	53.77%	492
Montezuma	75.46%	732	22.68%	220	0.52%	5	1.34%	13	52.78%	512
San Juan	74.57%	1,135	23.78%	362	0.13%	2	1.51%	23	50.79%	773
Clear Creek	73.96%	2,309	24.38%	761	0.42%	13	1.25%	39	49.58%	1,548
Ouray	71.91%	1,656	26.49%	610	0.26%	6	1.35%	31	45.42%	1,046
Hinsdale	71.60%	595	27.68%	230	0.48%	4	0.24%	2	43.92%	365
Summit	70.17%	967	28.59%	394	0.44%	6	0.80%	11	41.58%	573
Eagle	68.43%	943	29.90%	412	0.44%	6	1.23%	17	38.53%	531
San Miguel	67.99%	1,604	30.39%	717	0.47%	11	1.14%	27	37.60%	887
Garfield	66.46%	1,700	32.29%	826	0.66%	17	0.59%	15	34.17%	874
La Plata	66.59%	1,844	32.50%	900	0.40%	11	0.51%	14	34.09%	944
Teller	66.27%	9,659	32.51%	4,738	0.42%	61	0.80%	117	33.76%	4,921
Lake	65.00%	4,755	32.60%	2,385	1.08%	79	1.31%	96	32.40%	2,370
Chaffee	62.96%	1,890	34.41%	1,033	1.87%	56	0.77%	23	28.55%	857
Custer	63.00%	870	36.93%	510	0.00%	0	0.07%	1	26.07%	360
Gunnison	61.07%	1,559	37.02%	945	1.45%	37	0.47%	12	24.05%	614
Park	61.52%	940	37.89%	579	0.20%	3	0.39%	6	23.63%	361
Delta	58.71%	1,352	35.69%	822	3.26%	75	2.34%	54	23.01%	530
Montrose	56.60%	1,038	35.88%	658	2.73%	50	4.80%	88	20.72%	380
Saguache	59.13%	1,085	39.84%	731	0.44%	8	0.60%	11	19.29%	354
Rio Grande	58.63%	1,118	39.43%	752	1.31%	25	0.63%	12	19.19%	366
Mesa	55.69%	1,968	37.27%	1,317	3.88%	137	3.17%	112	18.42%	651
Routt	58.19%	828	40.41%	575	0.49%	7	0.91%	13	17.78%	253
Rio Blanco	57.93%	391	40.89%	276	0.59%	4	0.59%	4	17.04%	115
Boulder	55.81%	5,117	40.57%	3,719	2.88%	264	0.74%	68	15.25%	1,398
Arapahoe	55.81%	33,754	42.11%	25,469	1.37%	828	0.71%	432	13.70%	8,285
Las Animas	54.90%	4,204	44.16%	3,382	0.73%	56	0.21%	16	10.73%	822
Yuma	52.41%	392	42.25%	316	3.07%	23	2.27%	17	10.16%	76
Weld	52.20%	3,386	42.95%	2,786	4.64%	301	0.20%	13	9.25%	600
Fremont	51.19%	3,094	42.55%	2,572	4.04%	244	2.22%	134	8.64%	522
Jefferson	53.00%	2,138	44.79%	1,807	1.74%	70	0.47%	19	8.21%	331
Otero	51.79%	2,266	43.73%	1,913	4.34%	190	0.14%	6	8.07%	353
Gilpin	49.95%	1,498	45.72%	1,371	2.87%	86	1.47%	44	4.23%	127
Grand	51.27%	182	48.17%	171	0.00%	0	0.56%	2	3.10%	11
Larimer	48.05%	2,456	45.84%	2,343	5.67%	290	0.43%	22	2.21%	113
Elbert	49.31%	640	48.23%	626	2.08%	27	0.39%	5	1.08%	14
Douglas	49.62%	650	49.01%	642	1.22%	16	0.15%	2	0.61%	8
Logan	45.73%	583	46.59%	594	6.27%	80	1.41%	18	-0.86%	-11
Pueblo	48.32%	5,878	49.56%	6,028	1.47%	179	0.65%	79	-1.23%	-150
Bent	48.45%	546	50.49%	569	0.98%	11	0.09%	1	-2.04%	-23
Kiowa	48.48%	144	50.84%	151	0.00%	0	0.67%	2	-2.36%	-7
Baca	46.05%	134	53.95%	157	0.00%	0	0.00%	0	-7.90%	-23
Prowers	43.72%	633	53.11%	769	2.07%	30	1.10%	16	-9.39%	-136
El Paso	43.19%	6,230	53.76%	7,755	2.33%	336	0.71%	103	-10.57%	-1,525
Phillips	42.57%	275	53.72%	347	3.56%	23	0.15%	1	-11.15%	-72
Cheyenne	42.73%	97	56.39%	128	0.88%	2	0.00%	0	-13.66%	-31
Morgan	41.16%	538	55.32%	723	2.07%	27	1.45%	19	-14.15%	-185
Kit Carson	39.36%	259	58.36%	384	1.98%	13	0.30%	2	-19.00%	-125
Archuleta	40.18%	391	59.40%	578	0.41%	4	0.00%	0	-19.22%	-187
Sedgwick	37.05%	163	58.18%	256	4.77%	21	0.00%	0	-21.14%	-93
Washington	36.59%	191	59.77%	312	3.26%	17	0.38%	2	-23.18%	-121
Costilla	33.53%	453	65.43%	884	0.81%	11	0.22%	3	-31.90%	-431
Conejos	32.91%	912	66.87%	1,853	0.11%	3	0.11%	3	-33.96%	-941
Lincoln	32.55%	124	66.93%	255	0.52%	2	0.00%	0	-34.38%	-131
Huerfano	30.83%	1,022	68.69%	2,277	0.00%	0	0.48%	16	-37.86%	-1,255
