= Eldredge, Colorado =

Unincorporated community in Ouray County, Colorado, United States

- Unincorporated community
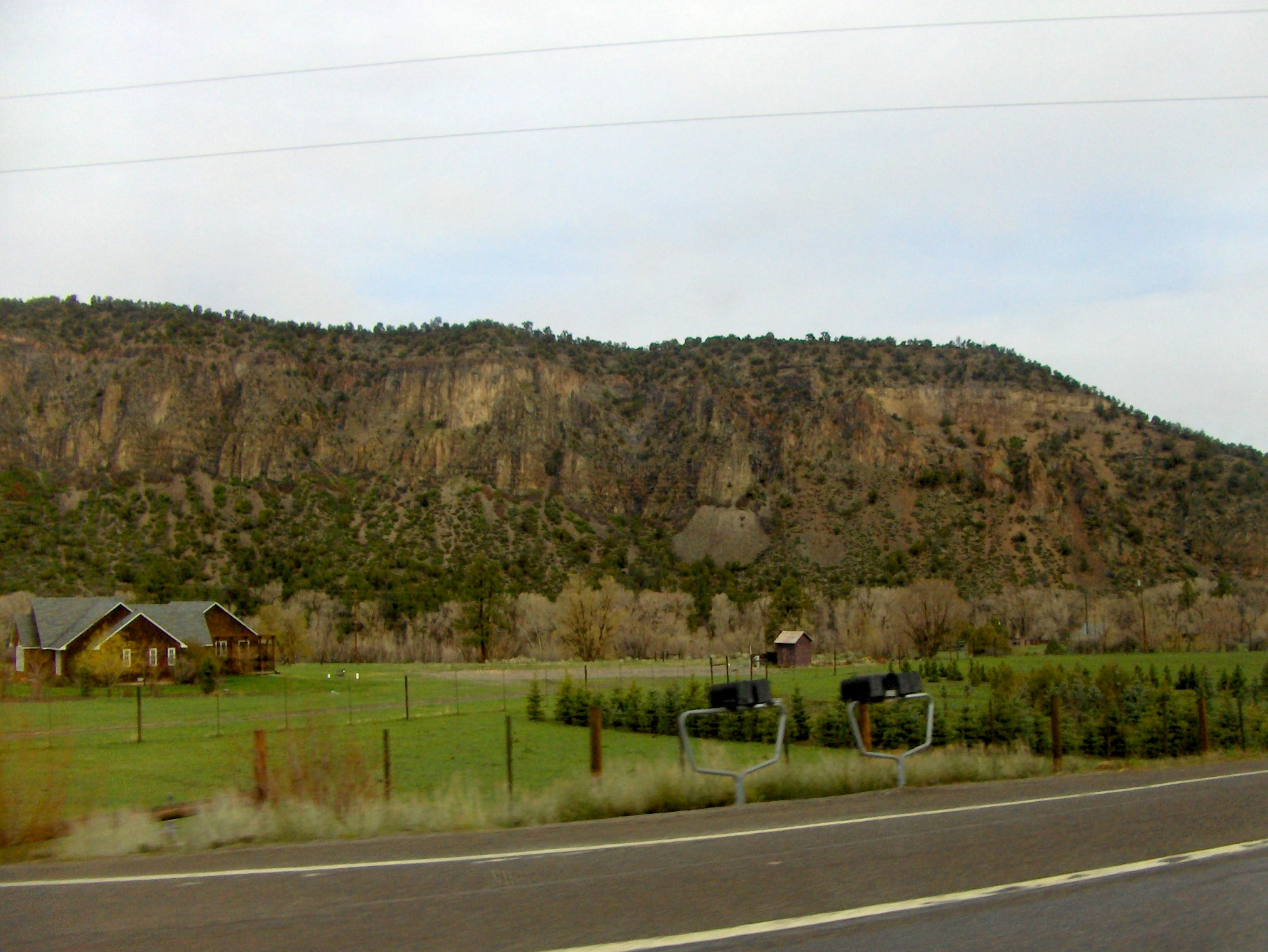
- An Eldredge tree farm.

- Location of Eldredge, Colorado. Eldredge (Colorado)
- Coordinates: 38°17′16″N 107°46′02″W
- Country: United States
- State: Colorado
- County: Ouray

Government
  - Type: Unincorporated community
  - Body: Ouray County
- Elevation: 6,539 ft (1,993 m)
- Time zone: UTC−07:00 (MST)
  - Summer (DST): UTC−06:00 (MDT)
- ZIP code: Ridgway 81432
- Area codes: 970/748
- GNIS place ID: 188239

Eldredge is an unincorporated community along the Uncompahgre River in Ouray County, Colorado, United States. The community is located between Colona and Ridgway - both within Ouray County - north of Ridgway State Park on the Colorado stretch of U.S. Route 550.

== Geography ==
Eldredge is located in northern Ouray County within a narrow valley, of similar size to the Roaring Fork Valley. To the south of the community is the Ridgway Reservoir and Ridgway State Park entrance, while to the north is the Uncompahgre Valley. The community is bisected for the most part by a large, but steep hill sloping up from the Uncompahgre River and is bound to the south by Cow Creek - within the Uncompaghre River Basin - and to the north by the end of the valley.

== See also ==
- Communities of Ouray County
