= Loghill Village, Colorado =

Census-designated place in Ouray County, CO, USA

- Census-designated place
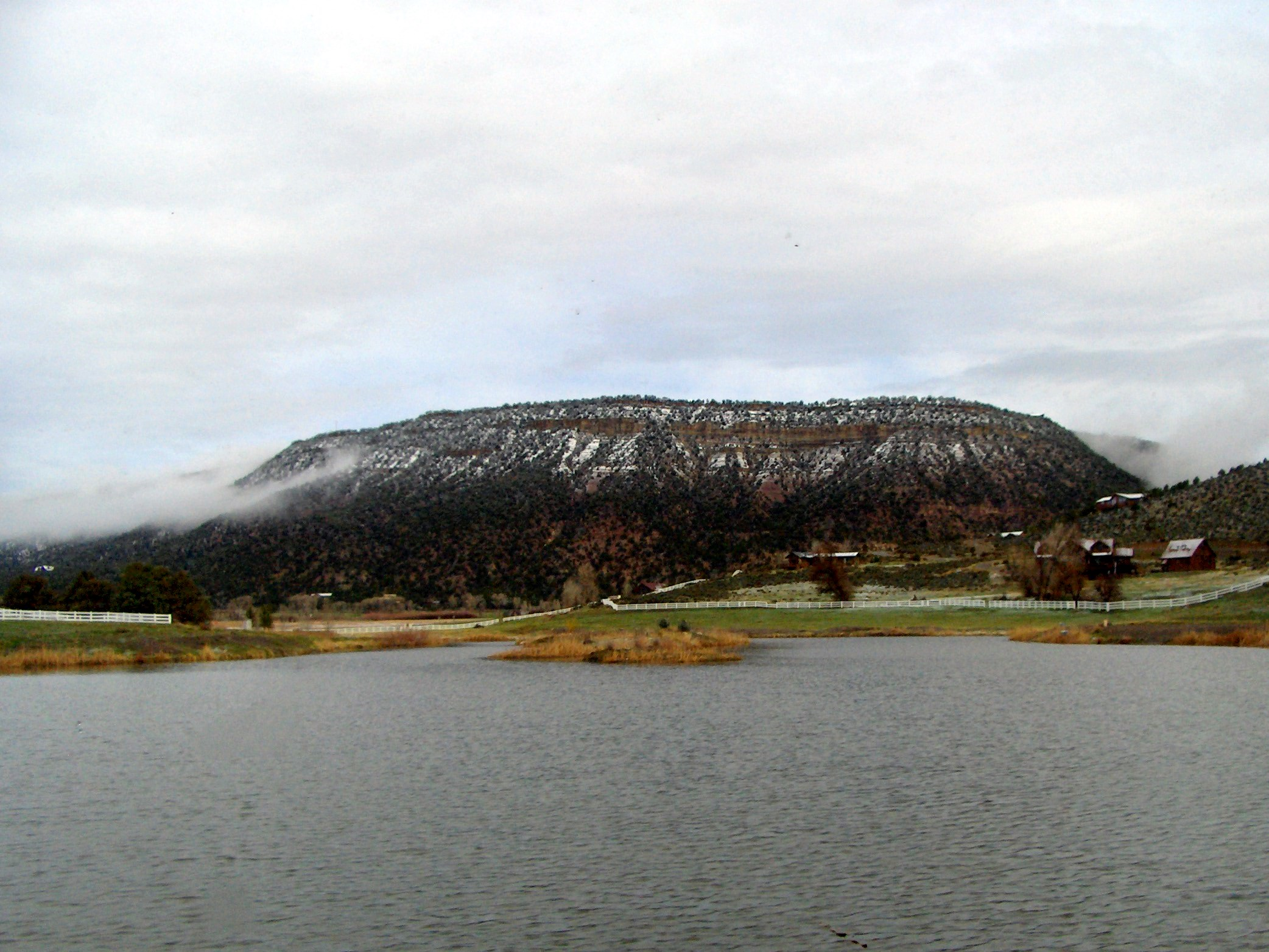
- Log Hill Mesa on which sits Loghill Village.

- Location of the Loghill Village CDP in Ouray County, Colorado
- Coordinates: 38°12′06″N 107°45′36″W
- Country: United States
- State: Colorado
- County: Ouray

Government
  - Type: Unincorporated community

Area
  - Total: 6.129 sq mi (15.874 km^{2})
  - Land: 6.129 sq mi (15.874 km^{2})
  - Water: 0 sq mi (0.000 km^{2})
- Elevation: 7,763 ft (2,366 m)

Population (2020)
  - Total: 617
  - Density: 101/sq mi (38.9/km^{2})
- Time zone: UTC-7 (MST)
  - Summer (DST): UTC-6 (MDT)
- ZIP Code: 81432
- Area code: 970
- GNIS feature ID: 2408628

Loghill Village is a census-designated place (CDP) in and governed by Ouray County, Colorado, United States. The CDP is a part of the Montrose, CO Micropolitan Statistical Area. The population of the Loghill Village CDP was 617 at the United States Census 2020. The Ridgway post office (Zip Code 81432) serves Loghill Village postal addresses.

== Geography ==
Loghill Village is located on Log Hill Mesa north of the town of Ridgway and northeast of Pleasant Valley. Loghill Village borders Ridgway State Park and Eldredge, though there is no direct road access between the two.

The Loghill Village CDP has an area of 3,923 acres (15.874 km^{2}), all land.

== Demographics ==
Loghill Village CDP, Colorado
Year	Pop.	±%
2000	311	—
2010	521	+67.5%
2020	617	+18.4%
Source: United States Census Bureau

The United States Census Bureau initially defined the Loghill Village CDP for the United States Census 2000.

== Communities ==
Loghill Village is divided into two main communities by a shallow gorge, a common greenbelt, running southwest to northeast.

- Fairway Pines - A golf course residential community in the northwest of Loghill Village. All the streets in Fairway Pines take their names from animals.
- Fisher Canyon - A community north of Loghill Village with access via County Road 1.
- Loghill Village - Occupying the southeast of Log Hill mesa where most of the streets take their names from trees. This community gives its name to the larger community (CDP).

== Infrastructure ==
=== Transportation ===
The nearest airport with scheduled service is Montrose Regional Airport, located approximately 25 miles (40 km) to the north via road, 19 miles (31 km) northwest. Loghill Village can be reached by exiting west off of U.S. Route 550 and north off State Highway 62. The latter road is also part of the San Juan Skyway Scenic Byway.

== See also ==
- List of census-designated places in Colorado
- Ridgway State Park
