= Ouray County, Colorado =

County in Colorado, United States

- County
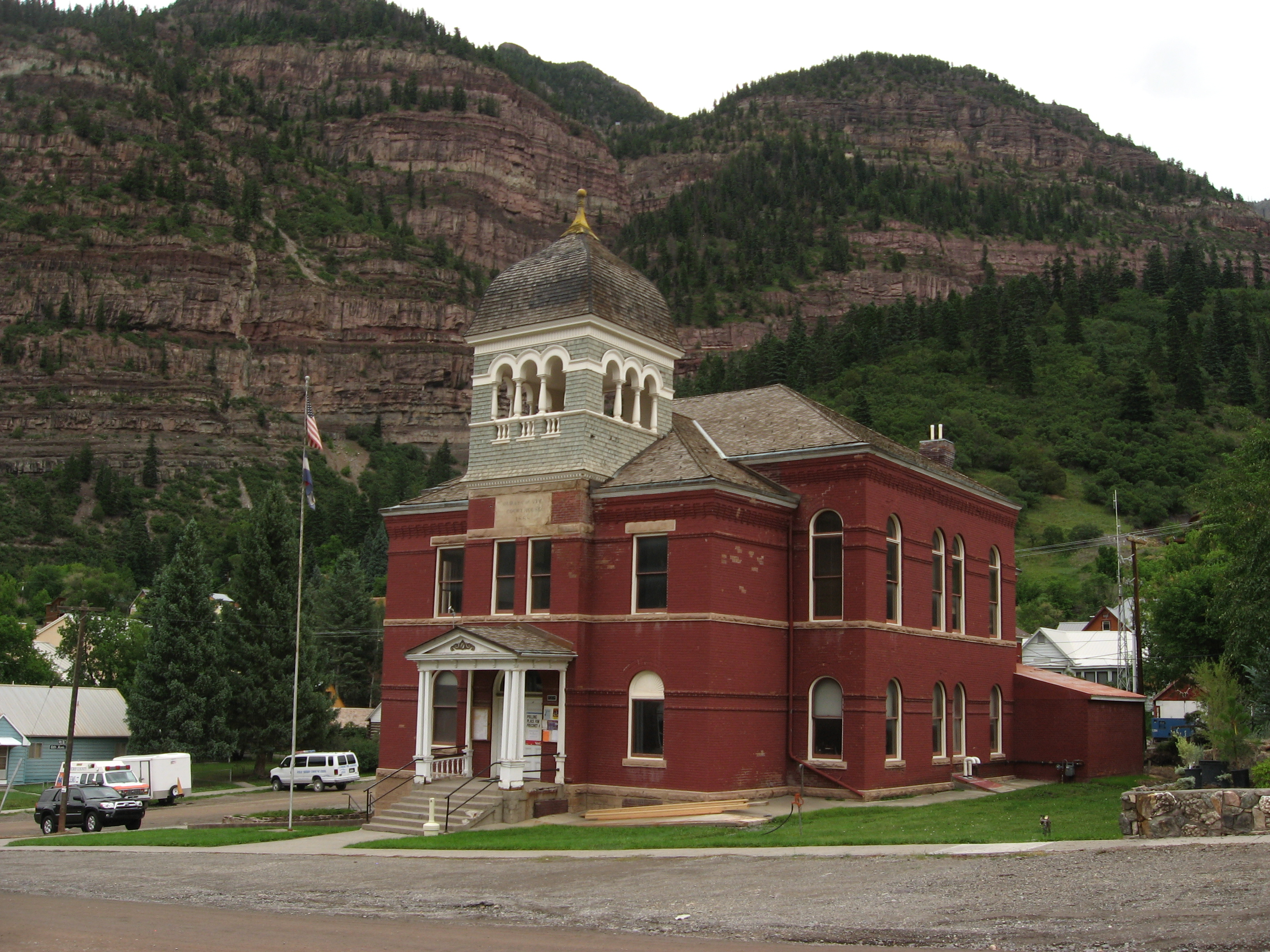
- Ouray County Courthouse
- Nickname: Switzerland of America
- Location within the U.S. state of Colorado
- Coordinates: 38.16°N 107.77°W
- Country: United States
- State: Colorado
- Founded: January 18, 1877
- Named for: Chief Ouray
- Seat: Ouray
- Largest city: Ridgway

Area
  - Total: 542 sq mi (1,400 km^{2})
  - Land: 542 sq mi (1,400 km^{2})
  - Water: 0.6 sq mi (1.6 km^{2}) 0.1%

Population (2020)
  - Total: 4,874
  - Estimate (2025): 5,265 ▲
  - Density: 9/sq mi (3.5/km^{2})
- Time zone: UTC−7 (Mountain)
  - Summer (DST): UTC−6 (MDT)
- Congressional district: 3rd
- Website: www.ouraycountyco.gov

Ouray County (/ˈjʊəreɪ/) is a county located in the U.S. state of Colorado. As of the 2020 Census, the population was 4,874. The county seat is Ouray, and the largest town is Ridgway. Because of its rugged mountain topography, Ouray County is known as the "Switzerland of America".

== History ==
Ouray County was formed out of San Juan County on January 18, 1877, making Ouray County the first county designated by the newly formed Colorado General Assembly. It was named for Chief Ouray, a distinguished leader of the Ute tribe, as was the municipality of Ouray, which was designated its county seat on March 8, 1877. On February 19, 1881, Dolores County was formed out of parts of Ouray County.

On February 27, 1883, Ouray County was split into San Miguel County and what is currently Ouray County. The portion that became San Miguel County almost retained the name Ouray County when the Colorado General Assembly initially renamed today's Ouray County as Uncompahgre County, but four days later, on March 2, 1883, the General Assembly changed its mind and reverted the name of Uncompahgre County back to Ouray County.

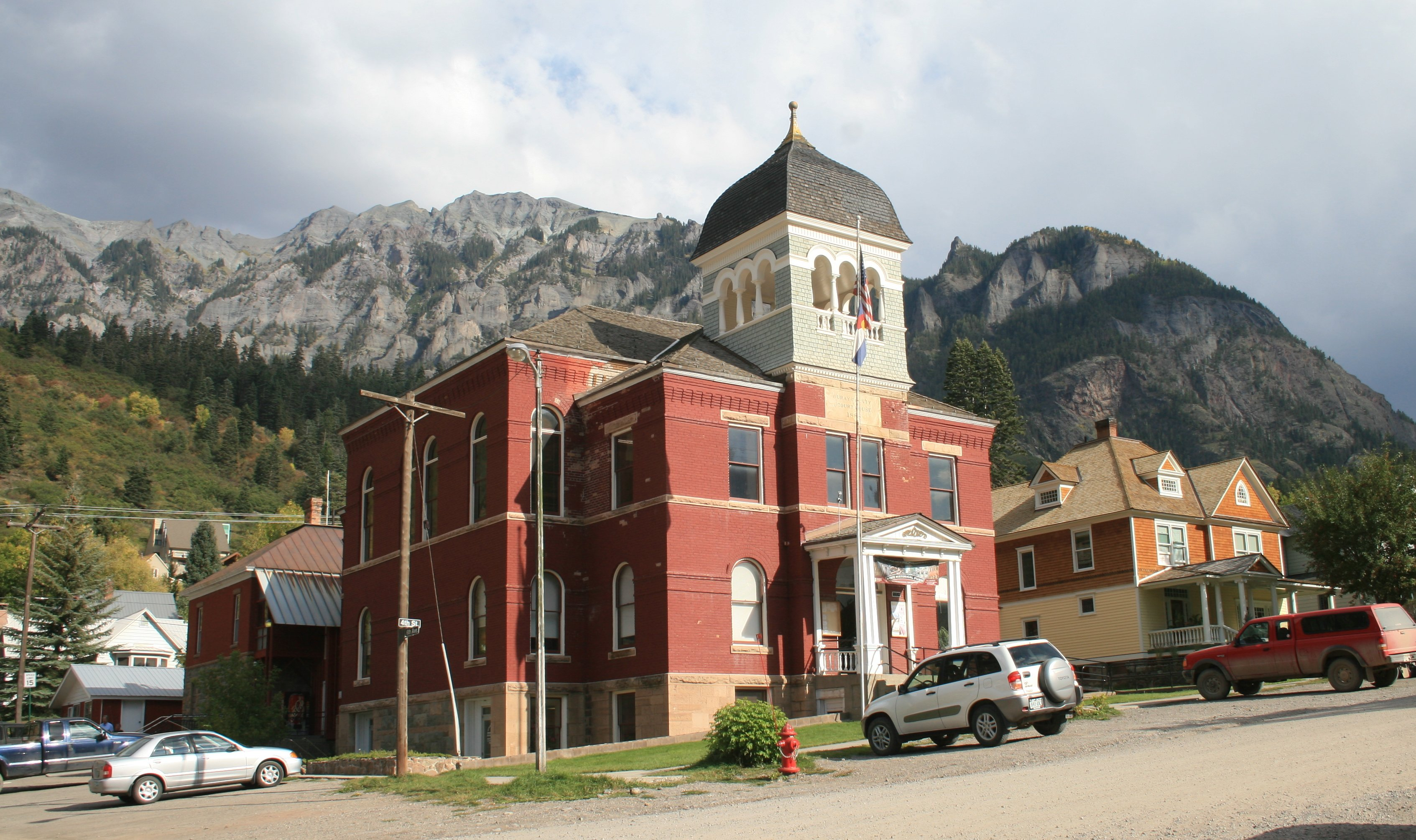
Ouray County Courthouse

The Ouray County Courthouse was constructed in Ouray in 1888 and is listed on the National Register of Historic Places.

Mining operators in the San Juan Mountains area of Colorado formed the San Juan District Mining Association (SJDMA) in 1903, as a direct result of a Western Federation of Miners proposal to the Telluride Mining Association for the eight-hour day, which had been approved in a referendum by 72 percent of Colorado voters. The new association consolidated the power of 36 mining properties in San Miguel, Ouray, and San Juan counties. The SJDMA refused to consider any reduction in hours or increase in wages, helping to provoke a bitter strike.

== Geography ==
According to the United States Census Bureau, the county has a total area of 542 square miles (1,400 km^{2}), of which 542 square miles (1,400 km^{2}) is land and 0.6 square miles (1.6 km^{2}) (0.1%) is water. The highest point in Ouray County is the summit of Mount Sneffels at 14,150 feet (4,310 m) above sea level. Many high peaks of more than 13,300 feet (4,100 m) also exist. Other prominent features in Ouray County include Log Hill Mesa and Pleasant Valley.

=== Adjacent counties ===
- Montrose County - north
- Gunnison County - northeast
- Hinsdale County - southeast
- San Juan County - south
- San Miguel County - southwest

=== Major highways ===
- U.S. Highway 550
- State Highway 62

== Demographics ==
Historical population
Census	Pop.	Note	%±
1880	2,669		—
1890	6,510		143.9%
1900	4,731		−27.3%
1910	3,514		−25.7%
1920	2,620		−25.4%
1930	1,784		−31.9%
1940	2,089		17.1%
1950	2,103		0.7%
1960	1,601		−23.9%
1970	1,546		−3.4%
1980	1,925		24.5%
1990	2,295		19.2%
2000	3,742		63.1%
2010	4,436		18.5%
2020	4,874		9.9%
2025 (est.)	5,265	▲	8.0%
U.S. Decennial Census; 1790-1960 1900-1990; 1990-2000 2010-2020

=== 2020 census ===
As of the 2020 census, the county had a population of 4,874. Of the residents, 14.2% were under the age of 18 and 28.8% were 65 years of age or older; the median age was 54.6 years. For every 100 females there were 100.9 males, and for every 100 females age 18 and over there were 99.6 males. 0.0% of residents lived in urban areas and 100.0% lived in rural areas.

Ouray County, Colorado – Racial and ethnic composition Note: the US Census treats Hispanic/Latino as an ethnic category. This table excludes Latinos from the racial categories and assigns them to a separate category. Hispanics/Latinos may be of any race.
Race / Ethnicity (NH = Non-Hispanic)	Pop 2000	Pop 2010	Pop 2020	% 2000	% 2010	% 2020
White alone (NH)	3,487	4,143	4,308	93.19%	93.40%	88.39%
Black or African American alone (NH)	3	6	16	0.08%	0.14%	0.33%
Native American or Alaska Native alone (NH)	32	14	16	0.86%	0.32%	0.33%
Asian alone (NH)	13	25	28	0.35%	0.56%	0.57%
Pacific Islander alone (NH)	2	5	2	0.05%	0.11%	0.04%
Other race alone (NH)	1	3	24	0.03%	0.07%	0.49%
Mixed race or Multiracial (NH)	52	44	188	1.39%	0.99%	3.86%
Hispanic or Latino (any race)	152	196	292	4.06%	4.42%	5.99%
Total	3,742	4,436	4,874	100.00%	100.00%	100.00%

The racial makeup of the county was 90.2% White, 0.3% Black or African American, 0.3% American Indian and Alaska Native, 0.6% Asian, 0.1% Native Hawaiian and Pacific Islander, 1.9% from some other race, and 6.6% from two or more races. Hispanic or Latino residents of any race comprised 6.0% of the population.

There were 2,297 households in the county, of which 18.9% had children under the age of 18 living with them and 19.8% had a female householder with no spouse or partner present. About 28.1% of all households were made up of individuals and 12.7% had someone living alone who was 65 years of age or older.

There were 3,314 housing units, of which 30.7% were vacant. Among occupied housing units, 75.8% were owner-occupied and 24.2% were renter-occupied. The homeowner vacancy rate was 3.3% and the rental vacancy rate was 17.9%.

=== 2000 census ===
As of the 2000 Census, there were 3,742 people, 1,576 households, and 1,123 families residing in the county. The population density was 7 people per square mile (2.7 people/km^{2}). There were 2,146 housing units at an average density of 4 units per square mile (1.5 units/km^{2}). The racial makeup of the county was 96.34% White, 0.08% Black or African American, 0.94% Native American, 0.35% Asian, 0.05% Pacific Islander, 0.53% from other races, and 1.71% from two or more races. 4.06% of the population were Hispanic or Latino of any race.

There were 1,576 households, out of which 28.60% had children under the age of 18 living with them, 61.40% were married couples living together, 6.50% had a female householder with no husband present, and 28.70% were non-families. 23.50% of all households were made up of individuals, and 5.50% had someone living alone who was 65 years of age or older. The average household size was 2.36 and the average family size was 2.77.

In the county, the population was spread out, with 22.50% under the age of 18, 4.10% from 18 to 24, 27.20% from 25 to 44, 34.10% from 45 to 64, and 12.20% who were 65 years of age or older. The median age was 43 years. For every 100 females there were 102.10 males. For every 100 females age 18 and over, there were 100.80 males.

The median income for a household in the county was $42,019, and the median income for a family was $49,776. Males had a median income of $35,141 versus $26,176 for females. The per capita income for the county was $24,335. About 6.00% of families and 7.20% of the population were below the poverty line, including 8.00% of those under age 18 and 2.90% of those age 65 or over.

== Politics ==
In the first three elections that it participated in, from 1880 until 1888, Ouray County voted for Republican presidential candidates, before voting for Populist James B. Weaver in 1892, and then for the Democrats from 1896 to 1908. Then, from 1912 until 1944, Ouray County was a swing county that voted for the winner of each election from Woodrow Wilson's 1912 victory to Franklin D. Roosevelt's 1940 victory; however, it broke that streak when it went for Thomas E. Dewey in 1944. Between 1944 and 2004, it transformed into a Republican stronghold, with Lyndon B. Johnson being the only Democrat to win the county in his 1964 landslide, with Republicans frequently getting 50-60% of the vote, even reaching more than 70% in Richard Nixon and Ronald Reagan's 49-state landslides in 1972 and 1984. In fact, Nixon and Reagan are the only candidates in history to receive 70% of the vote in the county, and Reagan remains the second-to-last candidate to even receive above 60% here, the last being George H. W. Bush in 1988. However, starting with Barack Obama's victory in 2008, Ouray County has transformed into a Democratic powerhouse, with Joe Biden winning it by almost 20 points in 2020. The county shifted even further into the Democratic column in 2024. The Democratic victories in 2020 and subsequently 2024 were the strongest performances by Democratic candidates in the county since 1936.

United States presidential election results for Ouray County, Colorado
Year	Republican		Democratic		Third party(ies)	
Year	No.	%	No.	%	No.	%
1880	479	53.05%	418	46.29%	6	0.66%
1884	499	55.57%	399	44.43%	0	0.00%
1888	961	55.29%	733	42.17%	44	2.53%
1892	324	18.23%	0	0.00%	1,453	81.77%
1896	38	1.70%	2,192	98.08%	5	0.22%
1900	610	26.49%	1,656	71.91%	37	1.61%
1904	916	44.04%	1,080	51.92%	84	4.04%
1908	539	31.91%	1,085	64.24%	65	3.85%
1912	273	18.62%	710	48.43%	483	32.95%
1916	399	28.08%	961	67.63%	61	4.29%
1920	735	61.51%	402	33.64%	58	4.85%
1924	484	44.28%	256	23.42%	353	32.30%
1928	535	51.49%	479	46.10%	25	2.41%
1932	398	34.55%	706	61.28%	48	4.17%
1936	428	38.35%	677	60.66%	11	0.99%
1940	589	49.12%	606	50.54%	4	0.33%
1944	503	62.33%	303	37.55%	1	0.12%
1948	574	54.93%	461	44.11%	10	0.96%
1952	697	61.85%	413	36.65%	17	1.51%
1956	634	65.90%	322	33.47%	6	0.62%
1960	508	54.04%	432	45.96%	0	0.00%
1964	358	43.66%	456	55.61%	6	0.73%
1968	401	52.01%	250	32.43%	120	15.56%
1972	669	74.58%	186	20.74%	42	4.68%
1976	645	62.50%	333	32.27%	54	5.23%
1980	813	67.69%	237	19.73%	151	12.57%
1984	914	70.85%	366	28.37%	10	0.78%
1988	814	63.89%	439	34.46%	21	1.65%
1992	653	41.25%	461	29.12%	469	29.63%
1996	984	54.85%	569	31.72%	241	13.43%
2000	1,279	57.28%	705	31.57%	249	11.15%
2004	1,402	51.53%	1,278	46.97%	41	1.51%
2008	1,367	44.67%	1,636	53.46%	57	1.86%
2012	1,481	46.25%	1,646	51.41%	75	2.34%
2016	1,351	40.82%	1,697	51.27%	262	7.92%
2020	1,577	39.23%	2,365	58.83%	78	1.94%
2024	1,573	38.38%	2,442	59.59%	83	2.03%

United States Senate election results for Ouray County, Colorado2
Year	Republican		Democratic		Third party(ies)	
Year	No.	%	No.	%	No.	%
2020	1,622	40.67%	2,291	57.45%	75	1.88%

United States Senate election results for Ouray County, Colorado3
Year	Republican		Democratic		Third party(ies)	
Year	No.	%	No.	%	No.	%
2022	1,327	37.21%	2,160	60.57%	79	2.22%

Colorado Gubernatorial election results for Ouray County
Year	Republican		Democratic		Third party(ies)	
Year	No.	%	No.	%	No.	%
2022	1,255	35.19%	2,242	62.87%	69	1.93%

== Recreation ==
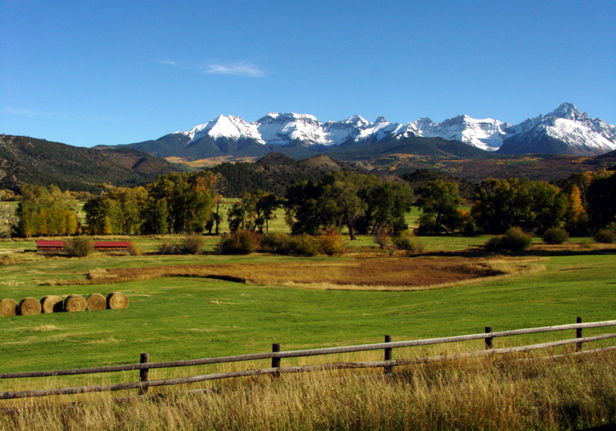
Ouray County, Colorado with Mount Sneffels

Ouray County is home to many parks and hiking trails. The Ridgway State Park is located due north of Ridgway on the Ridgway Reservoir and includes a marina and camping facilities, as well as an extensive trail system. Within and surrounding the county are the Uncompahgre National Forest, Mount Sneffels Wilderness, and the Uncompahgre Wilderness. Leading through the county is the Bear Creek National Recreation Trail. Well known for its view of the San Juan Mountains and Cimarron Range, scenic highways such as the Alpine Loop National Scenic Back Country Byway and San Juan Skyway National Scenic Byway exist. The Great Parks Bicycle Route and Western Express Bicycle Route also go through Ouray County.

The Elks Lodge in Ouray County is one of only a few surviving American locations for a bowling alley facility that uses exclusively human-operated pinsetting units to set the tenpins for bowling on its pair of vintage wood bowling lanes.

== Communities ==
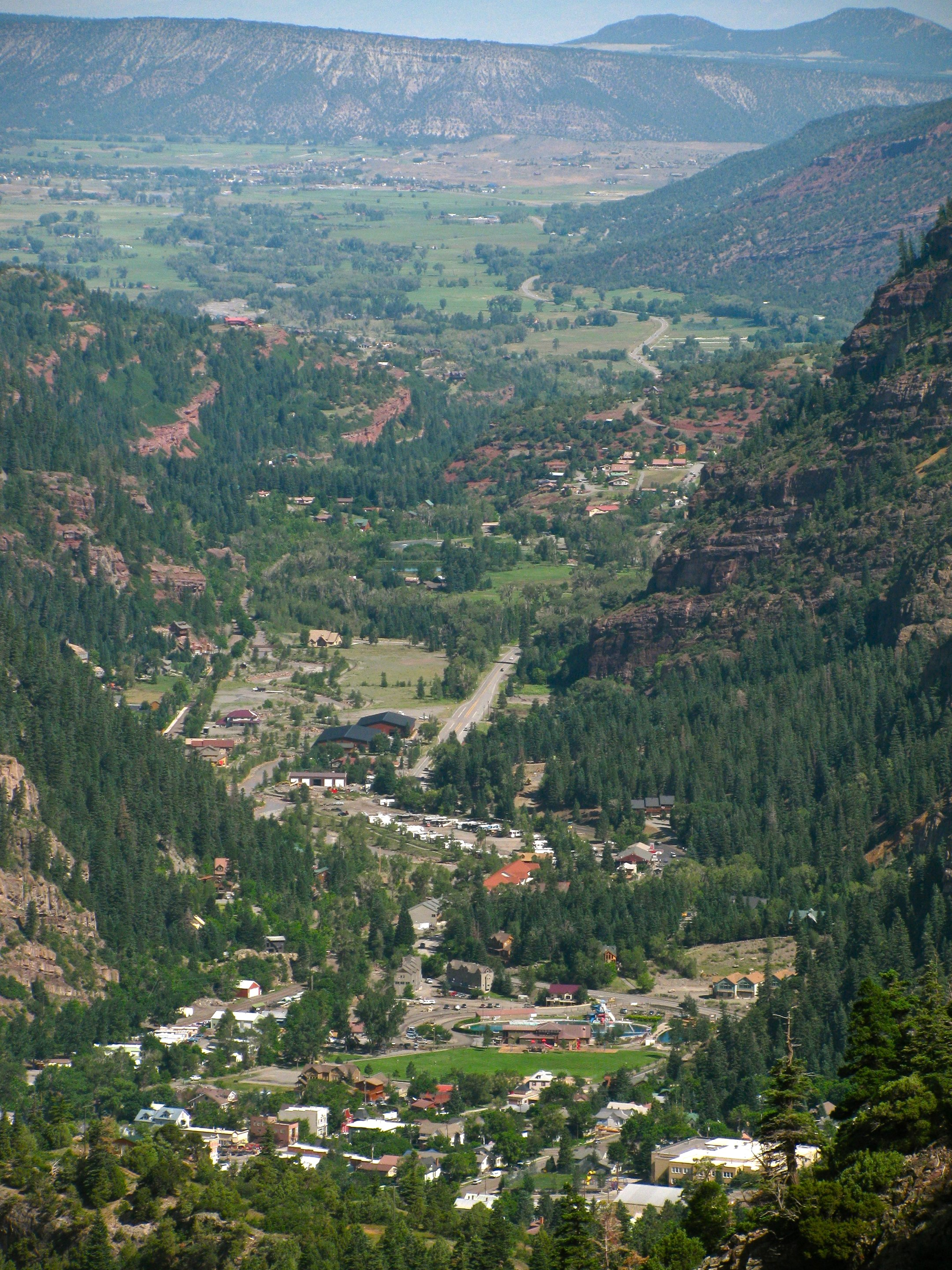
View from Ouray to Loghill Village

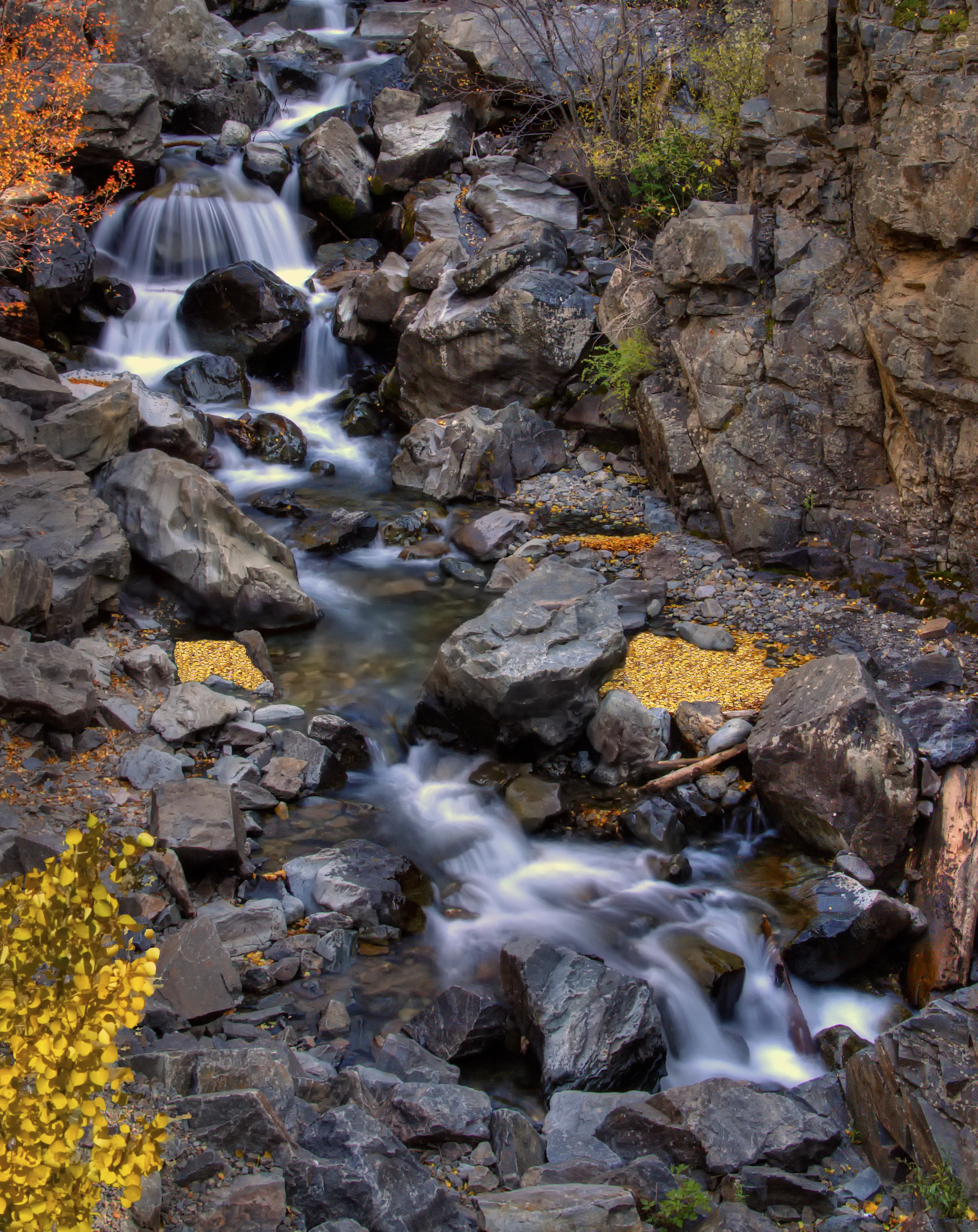
Fall colors on Bear Creek, south of Ouray

Ouray County has two home rule municipalities, and seven unincorporated communities. For statistical purposes, the U.S. Census Bureau has defined three of these as census-designated places (CDP). The home rule municipalities are the city of Ouray and town of Ridgway, also the most populous settlements in the county. Loghill Village is the next largest development. Along with Loghill, Portland and Colona serve as census-designated places within Ouray County. The other unincorporated communities within the county are Camp Bird, Dallas, Thistledown, and Eldredge. All the communities, with the exception of Ridgway and Ouray, serve as primarily residential communities, though Loghill Village maintains a small tourism sector.

Colona, Eldredge, and Dallas are located in the northern reaches of the county along U.S. Highway 550, though Eldredge and Dallas are located within the valleys of the San Juan Mountains while Colona is in the short stretch of the Uncompahgre Valley within Ouray County. Portland is placed down valley of Ouray, though still south of Ridgway. Camp Bird and Thistledown are communities placed southwest of Ouray on Camp Bird Road. From north to south the communities are Colona, Eldredge, Dallas, Ridgway, Ouray, and then southwest along Camp Bird Road to Thistledown and Camp Bird. The historic towns of Sneffels and Ironton are located further west from Camp Bird and south of Ouray, respectively. Populations listed below are from the 2010 United States census data.

Incorporated cities and towns

- Ouray - 898
- Ridgway - 1,183

census-designated places

- Loghill Village - 617
- Portland - 136
- Colona - 36

Unincorporated communities

- Eldredge
- Camp Bird
- Thistledown

=== Historic towns ===
- Dallas
- Guston
- Ironton
- Red Mountain Town
- Sneffels

== Minerals of Ouray County ==
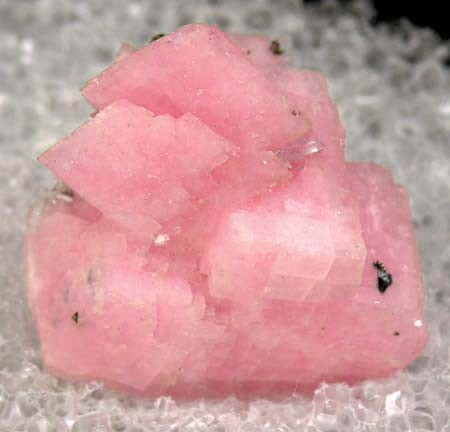
Rhodochrosite—Monarch Mountain Mine, Ouray District

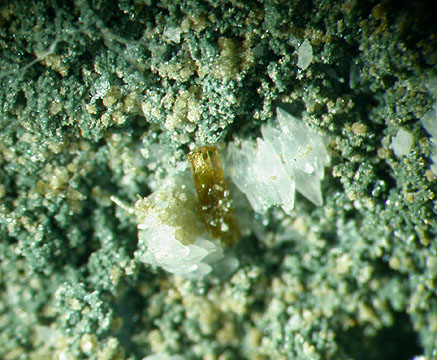
Sphalerite-Chalcopyrite-Quartz--Camp Bird Mine, Ouray

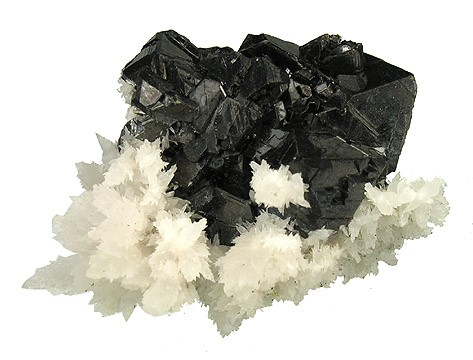
Sphalerite—Camp Bird Mine, Ouray

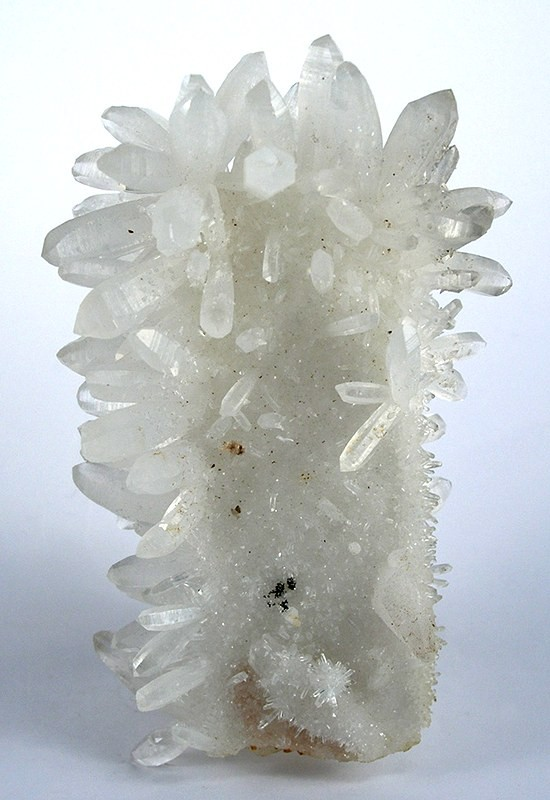
Quartz-Baryte—Silver Point Mine, Ouray County

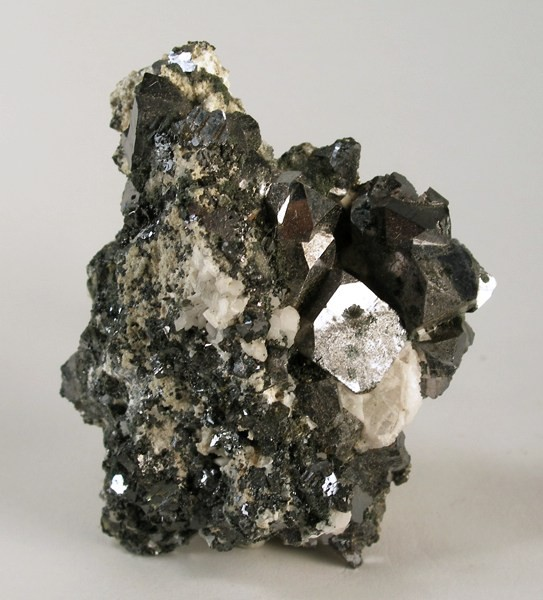
Galena—Camp Bird Mine, Ouray

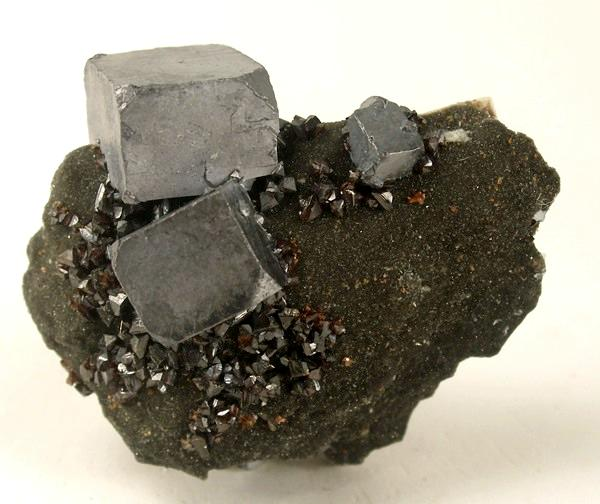
Galena-Sphalerite—Camp Bird Mine, Ouray

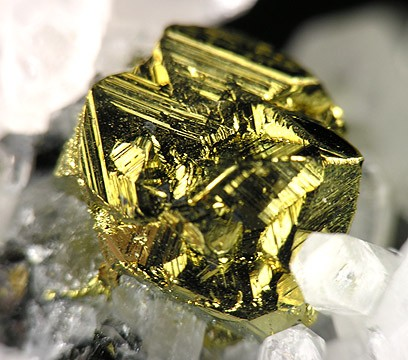
Chalcopyrite-Quartz—Camp Bird Mine, Ouray

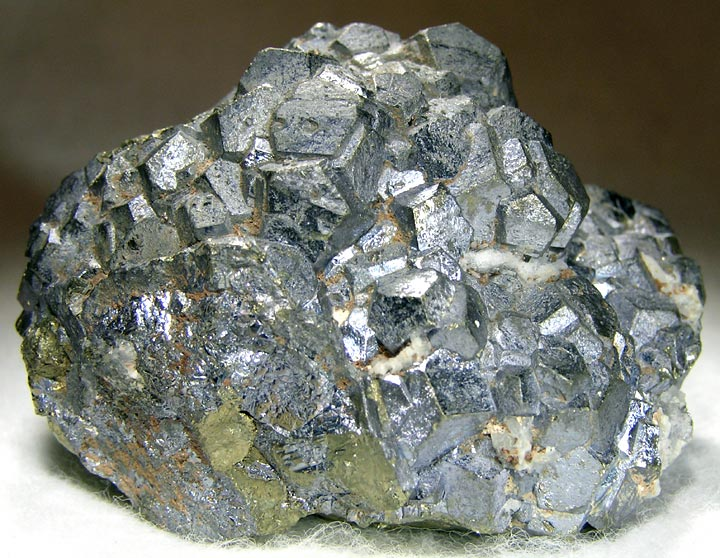
Molybdenite-Pyrite—Ouray County

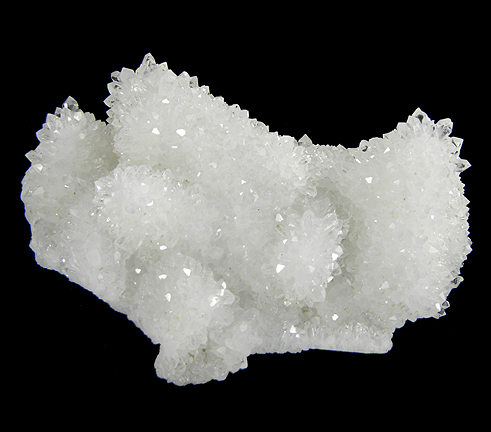
Quartz—Crystal Cave, Ouray

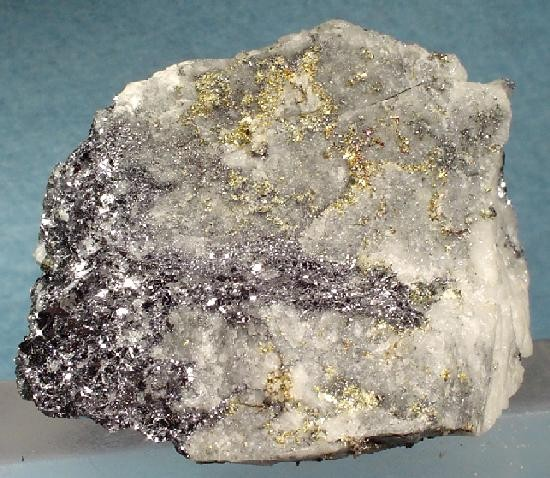
Gold—Ouray

== See also ==
- Ouray County Plaindealer local weekly newspaper
- Bibliography of Colorado
- Geography of Colorado
- History of Colorado
  - National Register of Historic Places listings in Ouray County, Colorado
- Index of Colorado-related articles
- List of Colorado-related lists
  - List of counties in Colorado
  - List of statistical areas in Colorado
- Outline of Colorado
