= 2012 United States presidential election in Colorado =

- November 6, 2012
- Turnout: 71.17% ▼

Nominee	Barack Obama	Mitt Romney
Party	Democratic	Republican
Home state	Illinois	Massachusetts
Running mate	Joe Biden	Paul Ryan
Electoral vote	9	0
Popular vote	1,323,102	1,185,243
Percentage	51.49%	46.13%

Obama
40–50%
50–60%
60–70%
70–80%
Romney
50–60%
60–70%
70–80%
80–90%
President before election
Barack Obama
Democratic
Elected President
Barack Obama
Democratic

The 2012 United States presidential election in Colorado took place on November 6, 2012, as part of the 2012 United States presidential election in which all 50 states plus the District of Columbia participated. Colorado voters chose nine electors to represent them in the Electoral College via a popular vote pitting incumbent Democratic President Barack Obama and his running mate, Vice President Joe Biden, against Republican challenger and former Massachusetts Governor Mitt Romney and his running mate, U.S. Representative Paul Ryan. Obama and Biden carried Colorado with 51.49% of the popular vote to Romney's and Ryan's 46.13%, thus winning the state's nine electoral votes by a 5.36% margin.

Obama's 2012 victory in the state, on the heels of his 2008 victory, marked the first time that the Democrats had carried Colorado in two consecutive elections since the landslide re-election of Franklin D. Roosevelt in 1936 and the first time since 1964 that a sitting Democratic president carried Colorado. This was the first time since 1964 that Democrats carried a majority of the state's congressional districts. As of the 2024 presidential election, this is the last election in which Conejos, Huerfano, and Las Animas counties have voted for the Democratic candidate.

== Caucuses ==
=== Democratic caucuses ===
Incumbent President Barack Obama ran unopposed in the Colorado Democratic caucuses.

=== Republican caucuses ===
The 2012 Colorado Republican presidential caucuses took place on 7 February 2012. It was part of the 2012 Republican Party presidential primaries. The race was widely expected to be won by Mitt Romney even on the day of the caucus, but a strong surge by Rick Santorum across all three races that day carried him to a close victory; however, the delegates were not legally bound to follow voter preferences and most voted for Romney.

== General election ==
=== Ballot access ===
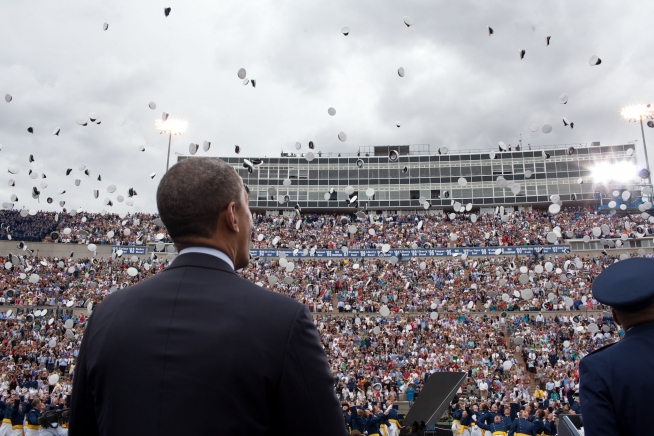
On the campaign trail, President Obama watches as graduates toss their hats during the United States Air Force Academy commencement ceremony at Falcon Stadium, USAF Academy in Colorado Springs, May 23, 2012.

- Virgil Goode/Jim Clymer, Constitution
- Barack Obama/Joseph Biden, Democratic
- Mitt Romney/Paul Ryan, Republican
- Gary Johnson/James P. Gray, Libertarian
- Jill Stein/Cheri Honkala, Green
- Stewart Alexander/Alex Mendoza, Socialist
- Rocky Anderson/Luis J. Rodriguez, Justice
- Roseanne Barr/Cindy Shehan, Peace and Freedom
- James Harris/Alyson Kennedy, Socialist Workers
- Tom Hoefling/J.D. Ellis, America's
- Gloria La Riva/Filberto Ramirez Jr., Socialism and Liberation
- Merlin Miller/Harry V. Bertram, American Third Position
- Jill Reed/Tom Cary, Twelve Visions Party
- Thomas Robert Stevens/Alden Link, Objectivist
- Shella "Samm" Tittle/Matthew A. Turner, We the People
- Jerry White/Phyllis Scherrer, Socialist Equality

=== Polling ===
Incumbent Barack Obama started off with a wide lead in polls ranging from 1 to 13 points, which continued throughout the early summer of 2012. On August 6, Romney won his first poll, 50% to 45%. Throughout the rest of the summer, and September, with the exception of a few points, Obama won almost every poll but narrowly. Romney gained momentum in October, and the race was essentially tied, with neither candidate taking a significant lead. The last week before the election, Obama gained momentum and won each of the 4 pre-election polls. The average of the last 3 pre-election polls showed Obama leading Romney 49.7% to 46.3%. The final pre-election poll showed Obama leading Romney 52% to 46%, which was accurate compared to the results. Washington Post rated this race "Toss-Up."

=== Predictions ===
Source	Ranking	As of
Huffington Post	Safe D	November 6, 2012
CNN	Tossup	November 6, 2012
The New York Times	Lean D	November 6, 2012
The Washington Post	Tossup	November 6, 2012
RealClearPolitics	Tossup	November 6, 2012
Sabato's Crystal Ball	Lean D	November 5, 2012
FiveThirtyEight	Likely D	November 6, 2012

=== Results ===
2012 United States presidential election in Colorado
Party	Candidate	Running mate	Votes	Percentage	Electoral votes
Democratic	Barack Obama (incumbent)	Joe Biden (incumbent)	1,323,102	51.45%	9
Republican	Mitt Romney	Paul Ryan	1,185,243	46.09%	0
Libertarian	Gary Johnson	Jim Gray	35,545	1.38%	0
Green	Jill Stein	Cheri Honkala	7,508	0.29%	0
Constitution	Virgil Goode	Jim Clymer	6,234	0.24%	0
Peace & Freedom	Roseanne Barr	Cindy Sheehan	5,059	0.20%	0
Unaffiliated	Jill Ann Reed	Tom Cary	2,589	0.10%	0
Justice	Rocky Anderson	Luis J. Rodriguez	1,260	0.05%	0
America's Party	Thomas Hoefling	Jonathan D. Ellis	679	0.03%	0
Socialism and Liberation	Gloria La Riva	Filberto Ramirez Jr.	317	0.01%	0
Socialist	Stewart Alexander	Alex Mendoza	308	0.01%	0
American Third Position	Merlin Miller	Harry Bertram	266	0.01%	0
Socialist Workers	James Harris	Alyson Kennedy	192	0.01%	0
Socialist Equality	Jerry White	Phyllis Scherrer	189	0.01%	0
Others	Others		796	0.03%	0
Totals			2,569,518	100.00%	9

==== By county ====
County	Barack Obama Democratic		Mitt Romney Republican		Various candidates Other parties		Margin		Total votes cast
County	#	%	#	%	#	%	#	%	Total votes cast
Adams	100,649	56.90%	70,972	40.12%	5,272	2.98%	29,677	16.78%	176,893
Alamosa	3,811	56.75%	2,705	40.28%	199	2.97%	1,106	16.47%	6,715
Arapahoe	153,905	53.90%	125,588	43.99%	6,023	2.11%	28,317	9.91%	285,516
Archuleta	2,679	39.78%	3,872	57.50%	183	2.72%	-1,193	-17.72%	6,734
Baca	467	22.17%	1,559	74.03%	80	3.80%	-1,092	-51.86%	2,106
Bent	815	41.97%	1,075	55.36%	52	2.67%	-260	-13.39%	1,942
Boulder	125,091	69.69%	49,981	27.84%	4,427	2.47%	75,110	41.85%	179,499
Broomfield	16,966	51.62%	15,008	45.67%	891	2.71%	1,958	5.95%	32,865
Chaffee	5,086	48.61%	5,070	48.46%	306	2.93%	16	0.15%	10,462
Cheyenne	172	15.74%	889	81.34%	32	2.92%	-717	-65.60%	1,093
Clear Creek	3,119	54.31%	2,430	42.31%	194	3.38%	689	12.00%	5,743
Conejos	2,213	53.96%	1,835	44.75%	53	1.29%	378	9.21%	4,101
Costilla	1,340	72.95%	446	24.28%	51	2.77%	894	48.67%	1,837
Crowley	535	35.62%	924	61.52%	43	2.86%	-389	-25.90%	1,502
Custer	868	31.97%	1,788	65.86%	59	2.17%	-920	-33.89%	2,715
Delta	4,622	29.02%	10,915	68.54%	388	2.44%	-6,293	-39.52%	15,925
Denver	222,018	73.41%	73,111	24.18%	7,289	2.41%	148,907	49.23%	302,418
Dolores	334	26.83%	859	69.00%	52	4.17%	-525	-42.17%	1,245
Douglas	61,094	36.35%	104,397	62.11%	2,593	1.54%	-43,303	-25.76%	168,084
Eagle	12,792	56.43%	9,411	41.52%	465	2.05%	3,381	14.91%	22,668
El Paso	111,819	38.54%	170,952	58.91%	7,404	2.55%	-59,133	-20.37%	290,175
Elbert	3,603	25.41%	10,266	72.41%	309	2.18%	-6,663	-47.00%	14,178
Fremont	6,704	32.84%	13,174	64.53%	538	2.63%	-6,470	-31.69%	20,416
Garfield	11,305	46.32%	12,535	51.36%	568	2.32%	-1,230	-5.04%	24,408
Gilpin	1,892	56.68%	1,346	40.32%	100	3.00%	546	16.36%	3,338
Grand	3,684	45.00%	4,253	51.95%	250	3.05%	-569	-6.95%	8,187
Gunnison	5,044	58.20%	3,341	38.55%	282	3.25%	1,703	19.65%	8,667
Hinsdale	229	38.17%	353	58.83%	18	3.00%	-124	-20.66%	600
Huerfano	1,953	52.46%	1,646	44.21%	124	3.33%	307	8.25%	3,723
Jackson	216	25.47%	600	70.75%	32	3.78%	-384	-45.28%	848
Jefferson	159,296	51.21%	144,197	46.36%	7,559	2.43%	15,099	4.85%	311,052
Kiowa	118	14.37%	677	82.46%	26	3.17%	-559	-68.09%	821
Kit Carson	838	22.64%	2,785	75.23%	79	2.13%	-1,947	-52.59%	3,702
La Plata	15,489	52.85%	12,794	43.65%	1,025	3.50%	2,695	9.20%	29,308
Lake	1,839	60.49%	1,098	36.12%	103	3.39%	741	24.37%	3,040
Larimer	92,747	51.47%	82,376	45.72%	5,057	2.81%	10,371	5.75%	180,180
Las Animas	3,445	50.20%	3,263	47.55%	154	2.25%	182	2.65%	6,862
Lincoln	552	24.14%	1,687	73.76%	48	2.10%	-1,135	-49.62%	2,287
Logan	2,712	29.72%	6,179	67.72%	233	2.56%	-3,467	-38.00%	9,124
Mesa	23,846	32.69%	47,472	65.08%	1,629	2.23%	-23,626	-32.39%	72,947
Mineral	291	44.77%	344	52.92%	15	2.31%	-53	-8.15%	650
Moffat	1,330	21.56%	4,695	76.12%	143	2.32%	-3,365	-54.56%	6,168
Montezuma	4,542	36.87%	7,401	60.08%	375	3.05%	-2,859	-23.21%	12,318
Montrose	6,138	30.49%	13,552	67.32%	440	2.19%	-7,414	-36.83%	20,130
Morgan	3,912	36.30%	6,602	61.26%	263	2.44%	-2,690	-24.96%	10,777
Otero	3,647	44.52%	4,382	53.49%	163	1.99%	-735	-8.97%	8,192
Ouray	1,646	51.41%	1,481	46.25%	75	2.34%	165	5.16%	3,202
Park	3,862	41.23%	5,236	55.90%	268	2.87%	-1,374	-14.67%	9,366
Phillips	588	25.96%	1,637	72.27%	40	1.77%	-1,049	-46.31%	2,265
Pitkin	6,849	67.98%	3,024	30.01%	202	2.01%	3,825	37.97%	10,075
Prowers	1,519	31.24%	3,230	66.42%	114	2.34%	-1,711	-35.18%	4,863
Pueblo	42,551	55.68%	31,894	41.74%	1,974	2.58%	10,657	13.94%	76,419
Rio Blanco	568	16.86%	2,724	80.85%	77	2.29%	-2,156	-63.99%	3,369
Rio Grande	2,478	44.79%	2,918	52.74%	137	2.47%	-440	-7.95%	5,533
Routt	7,547	56.67%	5,469	41.07%	301	2.26%	2,078	15.60%	13,317
Saguache	1,865	63.61%	964	32.88%	103	3.51%	901	30.73%	2,932
San Juan	266	52.57%	212	41.90%	28	5.53%	54	10.67%	506
San Miguel	2,992	70.30%	1,154	27.11%	110	2.59%	1,838	43.19%	4,256
Sedgwick	419	31.32%	881	65.84%	38	2.84%	-462	-34.52%	1,338
Summit	9,347	61.04%	5,571	36.38%	394	2.58%	3,776	24.66%	15,312
Teller	4,333	32.16%	8,702	64.59%	438	3.25%	-4,369	-32.43%	13,473
Washington	468	18.06%	2,076	80.12%	47	1.82%	-1,608	-62.06%	2,591
Weld	49,050	42.18%	63,775	54.84%	3,466	2.98%	-14,725	-12.66%	116,291
Yuma	987	21.56%	3,490	76.25%	100	2.19%	-2,503	-54.69%	4,577
Total	1,323,102	51.45%	1,185,243	46.09%	63,501	2.47%	137,859	5.36%	2,571,846

Counties that flipped from Republican to Democratic

- Chaffee (largest city: Salida)

==== By congressional district ====
Obama won four of seven congressional districts including one held by a Republican.

District	Romney	Obama	Representative
1st	28.83%	69%	Diana DeGette
2nd	39.51%	57.92%	Jared Polis
3rd	51.8%	45.77%	Scott Tipton
4th	58.5%	39.22%	Cory Gardner
5th	59.12%	38.3%	Doug Lamborn
6th	46.5%	51.56%	Mike Coffman
7th	41.26%	56.09%	Ed Perlmutter

== See also ==
- 2012 Republican Party presidential primaries
- 2012 Republican Party presidential debates and forums
- Results of the 2012 Republican Party presidential primaries
- Colorado Republican Party
- United States presidential elections in Colorado
