= Ridgway Reservoir =

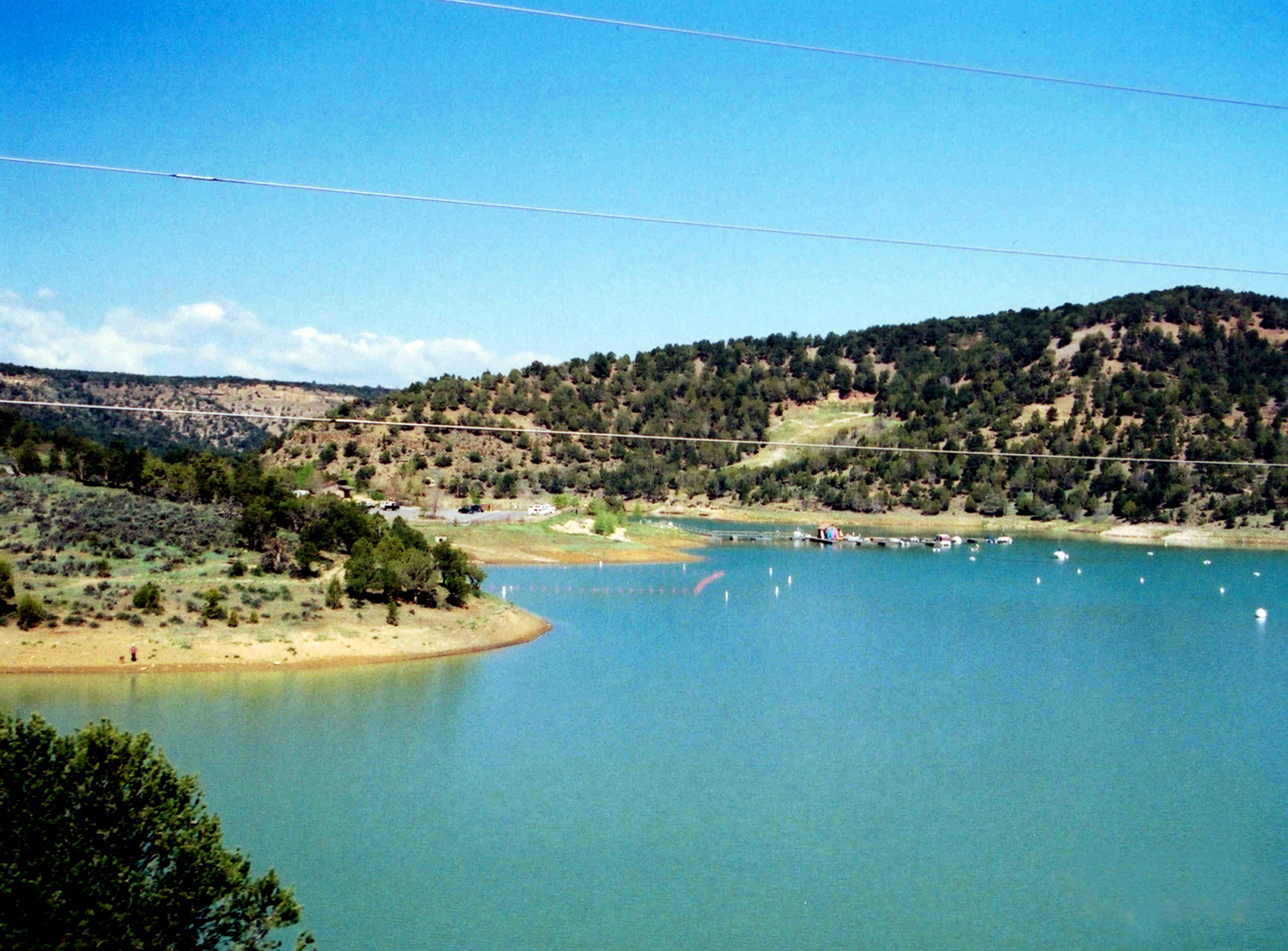
- Ridgway Reservoir

- Location within Colorado Location within the United States
- Location: Ouray County, Colorado
- Coordinates: 38.2308227°N 107.7564477°W
- Type: reservoir
- Surface elevation: 6,699 feet (2,042 m)

Ridgway Reservoir is a lake impounded by Ridgway Dam (38°14′13″N 107°45′31″W) on the Uncompahgre River north of the town of Ridgway in Ouray County, Colorado in the western United States. Ridgway Dam was built as part of the Dallas Creek Project. Construction began in 1978 and completed in 1987. The lake was first filled in 1990 as an aid to irrigation of the Uncompahgre Valley and flood control. Today recreation opportunities are provided at Ridgway State Park along the lake.

== See also ==
- List of largest reservoirs of Colorado

== Gallery ==
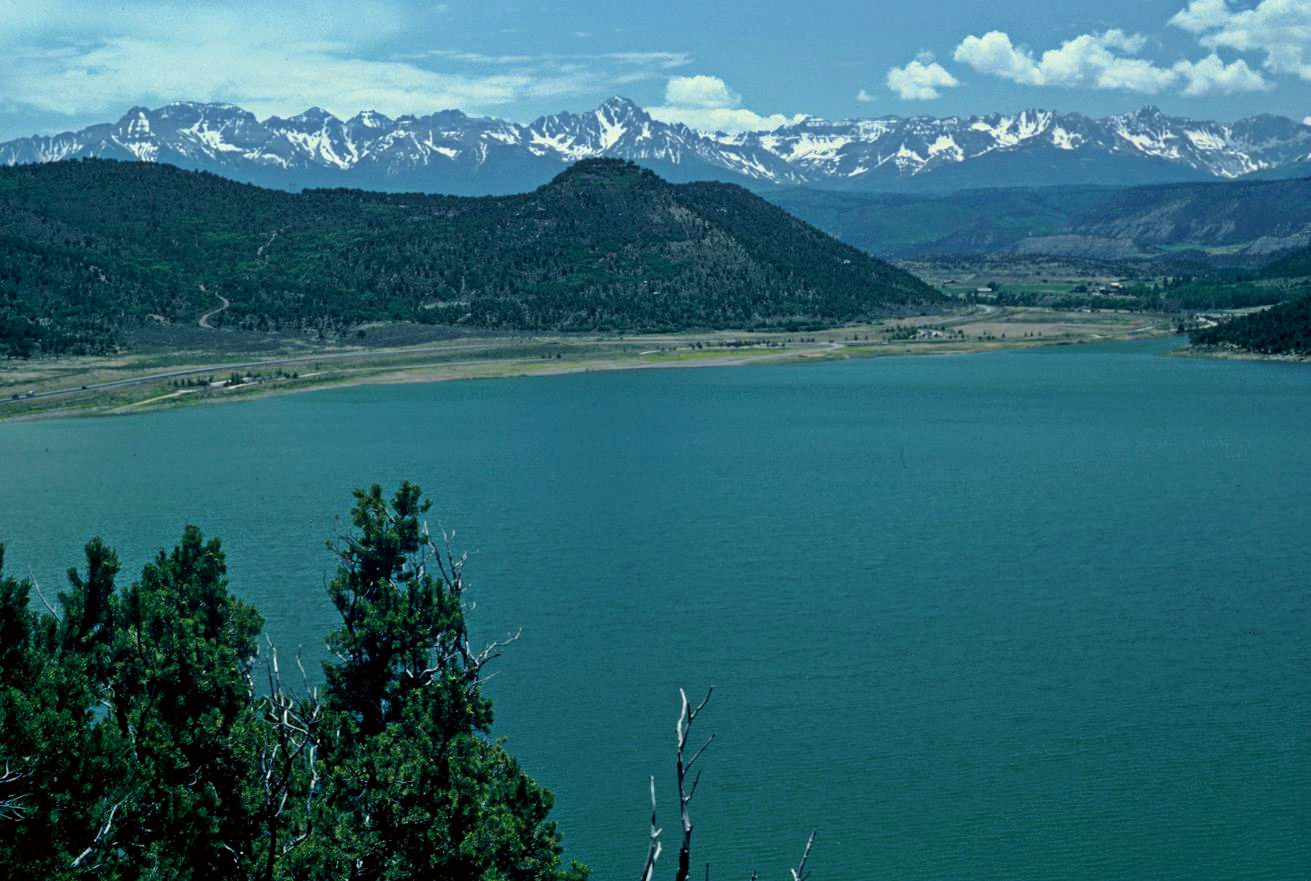
Sneffels Range and Ridgway Reservoir
