= 1988 United States presidential election in Colorado =

- November 8, 1988
- Turnout: 70.3%

Nominee	George H. W. Bush	Michael Dukakis
Party	Republican	Democratic
Home state	Texas	Massachusetts
Running mate	Dan Quayle	Lloyd Bentsen
Electoral vote	8	0
Popular vote	728,177	621,453
Percentage	53.06%	45.28%
County results
Bush
50–60%
60–70%
70–80%
Dukakis
50–60%
60–70%
70–80%
President before election
Ronald Reagan
Republican
Elected President
George H. W. Bush
Republican

The 1988 United States presidential election in Colorado took place on November 8, 1988, as part of the 1988 United States presidential election, which was held throughout all 50 states and D.C. Voters chose eight representatives, or electors to the Electoral College, who voted for president and vice president.

Colorado voted for the Republican nominee, Vice President George H. W. Bush, over the Democratic nominee, Massachusetts Governor Michael Dukakis, by a margin of 7.78%. Bush took 53.06% of the vote to Dukakis' 45.28%. While the Republicans held onto Colorado's eight electoral votes, Bush's 53–45 win over Dukakis represented a vastly diminished margin compared to 1984, when Ronald Reagan had won the state in a 63–35 landslide over Walter Mondale. Unlike in the several preceding elections, Colorado voted roughly in line with the national results overall, which Bush won by 7.72%, a 0.06% difference to the right.

Dukakis made substantial inroads by improving on Mondale's vote share in the city of Denver by over 10% (getting the highest vote share of any nominee in the city since Lyndon Johnson in 1964), becoming the first Democrat since 1964 (and only the second since 1936) to carry Boulder County, and comfortably reclaiming Pitkin County, which had supported McGovern in 1972 but had gone on to vote Republican in the next three elections.

As of the 2024 presidential election, this is the last election in which Summit County voted for a Republican presidential candidate. Bush became the first Republican to win the White House without carrying Boulder or Saguache Counties since William Howard Taft in 1908.

== General election ==
=== Predictions ===
Source	Rating	As of
The Cook Political Report	Likely R	September 24, 1988

=== Results ===
1988 United States presidential election in Colorado
Party	Candidate	Votes	Percentage	Electoral votes
Republican	George H. W. Bush	728,177	53.06%	8
Democratic	Michael Dukakis	621,453	45.28%	0
CO Libertarian	Ron Paul	15,482	1.13%	0
CO Prohibition	Earl Dodge	4,604	0.34%	0
New Alliance	Lenora Fulani	2,539	0.19%	0
No party	David Duke (Write-in)	139	0.01%	0
Totals		1,372,394	100.00%	8

==== By county ====
County	George H.W. Bush Republican		Michael Dukakis Democratic		Various candidates Other parties		Margin		Total votes cast
County	#	%	#	%	#	%	#	%	Total votes cast
Adams	43,163	45.87%	49,464	52.57%	1,467	1.56%	-6,301	-6.70%	94,094
Alamosa	2,567	53.70%	2,146	44.90%	67	1.40%	421	8.80%	4,780
Arapahoe	95,926	60.24%	61,113	38.38%	2,206	1.38%	34,813	21.86%	159,245
Archuleta	1,440	63.66%	795	35.15%	27	1.19%	645	28.51%	2,262
Baca	1,670	65.34%	851	33.29%	35	1.37%	819	32.05%	2,556
Bent	1,032	47.62%	1,088	50.21%	47	2.17%	-56	-2.59%	2,167
Boulder	48,174	44.93%	57,265	53.41%	1,784	1.66%	-9,091	-8.48%	107,223
Chaffee	3,080	53.90%	2,548	44.59%	86	1.51%	532	9.31%	5,714
Cheyenne	760	64.08%	399	33.64%	27	2.28%	361	30.44%	1,186
Clear Creek	1,820	50.11%	1,698	46.75%	114	3.14%	122	3.36%	3,632
Conejos	1,445	41.92%	1,976	57.33%	26	0.75%	-531	-15.41%	3,447
Costilla	454	28.72%	1,120	70.84%	7	0.44%	-666	-42.12%	1,581
Crowley	862	57.47%	630	42.00%	8	0.53%	232	15.47%	1,500
Custer	753	69.46%	310	28.60%	21	1.94%	443	40.86%	1,084
Delta	5,449	59.59%	3,521	38.51%	174	1.90%	1,928	21.08%	9,144
Denver	77,753	37.13%	127,173	60.72%	4,504	2.15%	-49,420	-23.59%	209,430
Dolores	488	66.67%	230	31.42%	14	1.91%	258	35.25%	732
Douglas	17,035	69.96%	6,931	28.46%	384	1.58%	10,104	41.50%	24,350
Eagle	4,366	55.91%	3,314	42.44%	129	1.65%	1,052	13.47%	7,809
El Paso	96,965	70.03%	39,995	28.88%	1,506	1.09%	56,970	41.15%	138,466
Elbert	2,805	63.06%	1,566	35.21%	77	1.73%	1,239	27.85%	4,448
Fremont	7,623	58.24%	5,278	40.33%	187	1.43%	2,345	17.91%	13,088
Garfield	6,358	57.21%	4,620	41.57%	136	1.22%	1,738	15.64%	11,114
Gilpin	728	45.79%	804	50.57%	58	3.64%	-76	-4.78%	1,590
Grand	2,306	60.08%	1,451	37.81%	81	2.11%	855	22.27%	3,838
Gunnison	2,520	55.72%	1,897	41.94%	106	2.34%	623	13.78%	4,523
Hinsdale	295	72.48%	111	27.27%	1	0.25%	184	45.21%	407
Huerfano	1,079	36.32%	1,876	63.14%	16	0.54%	-797	-26.82%	2,971
Jackson	584	65.54%	294	33.00%	13	1.46%	290	32.54%	891
Jefferson	110,820	56.39%	81,824	41.64%	3,867	1.97%	28,996	14.75%	196,511
Kiowa	645	61.25%	398	37.80%	10	0.95%	247	23.45%	1,053
Kit Carson	2,262	64.41%	1,196	34.05%	54	1.54%	1,066	30.36%	3,512
La Plata	7,714	57.73%	5,443	40.73%	205	1.54%	2,271	17.00%	13,362
Lake	969	38.10%	1,516	59.61%	58	2.29%	-547	-21.51%	2,543
Larimer	45,967	55.34%	35,703	42.98%	1,396	1.68%	10,264	12.36%	83,066
Las Animas	2,162	34.15%	4,075	64.37%	94	1.48%	-1,913	-30.22%	6,331
Lincoln	1,356	60.29%	874	38.86%	19	0.85%	482	21.43%	2,249
Logan	4,485	56.24%	3,382	42.41%	108	1.35%	1,103	13.83%	7,975
Mesa	22,150	59.62%	14,372	38.68%	633	1.70%	7,778	20.94%	37,155
Mineral	217	55.08%	174	44.16%	3	0.76%	43	10.92%	394
Moffat	2,757	61.01%	1,634	36.16%	128	2.83%	1,123	24.85%	4,519
Montezuma	4,208	64.23%	2,233	34.09%	110	1.68%	1,975	30.14%	6,551
Montrose	6,012	60.16%	3,748	37.51%	233	2.33%	2,264	22.65%	9,993
Morgan	4,795	55.24%	3,728	42.95%	157	1.81%	1,067	12.29%	8,680
Otero	4,265	51.39%	3,910	47.11%	124	1.50%	355	4.28%	8,299
Ouray	814	63.89%	439	34.46%	21	1.65%	375	29.43%	1,274
Park	1,909	56.87%	1,343	40.01%	105	3.12%	566	16.86%	3,357
Phillips	1,317	57.81%	923	40.52%	38	1.67%	394	17.29%	2,278
Pitkin	2,801	44.28%	3,420	54.06%	105	1.66%	-619	-9.78%	6,326
Prowers	2,978	56.34%	2,207	41.75%	101	1.91%	771	14.59%	5,286
Pueblo	20,119	37.73%	32,788	61.50%	411	0.77%	-12,669	-23.77%	53,318
Rio Blanco	1,821	68.41%	803	30.17%	38	1.42%	1,018	38.24%	2,662
Rio Grande	2,626	62.01%	1,545	36.48%	64	1.51%	1,081	25.53%	4,235
Routt	3,264	51.65%	2,922	46.24%	133	2.11%	342	5.41%	6,319
Saguache	945	46.94%	1,033	51.32%	35	1.74%	-88	-4.38%	2,013
San Juan	210	50.36%	192	46.04%	15	3.60%	18	4.32%	417
San Miguel	798	43.39%	961	52.26%	80	4.35%	-163	-8.87%	1,839
Sedgwick	921	59.61%	611	39.55%	13	0.84%	310	20.06%	1,545
Summit	2,893	51.44%	2,595	46.14%	136	2.42%	298	5.30%	5,624
Teller	3,760	68.36%	1,656	30.11%	84	1.53%	2,104	38.25%	5,500
Washington	1,707	62.87%	958	35.29%	50	1.84%	749	27.58%	2,715
Weld	26,497	55.42%	20,548	42.98%	762	1.60%	5,949	12.44%	47,807
Yuma	2,513	56.93%	1,835	41.57%	66	1.50%	678	15.36%	4,414
Total	728,177	53.06%	621,453	45.28%	22,764	1.66%	106,724	7.78%	1,372,394

==== Counties that flipped from Republican to Democratic ====
- Lake
- Conejos
- Pitkin
- San Miguel
- Boulder
- Adams
- Gilpin
- Bent
- Saguache

=== By congressional district ===
Bush won four of six congressional districts, including one held by a Democrat.

District	Bush	Dukakis	Representative
1st	37%	63%	Pat Schroeder
2nd	49%	51%	David Skaggs
3rd	53%	47%	Ben Nighthorse Campbell
4th	56%	44%	Hank Brown
5th	68%	32%	Joel Hefley
6th	57%	43%	Daniel Schaefer
