= Uncompahgre River =

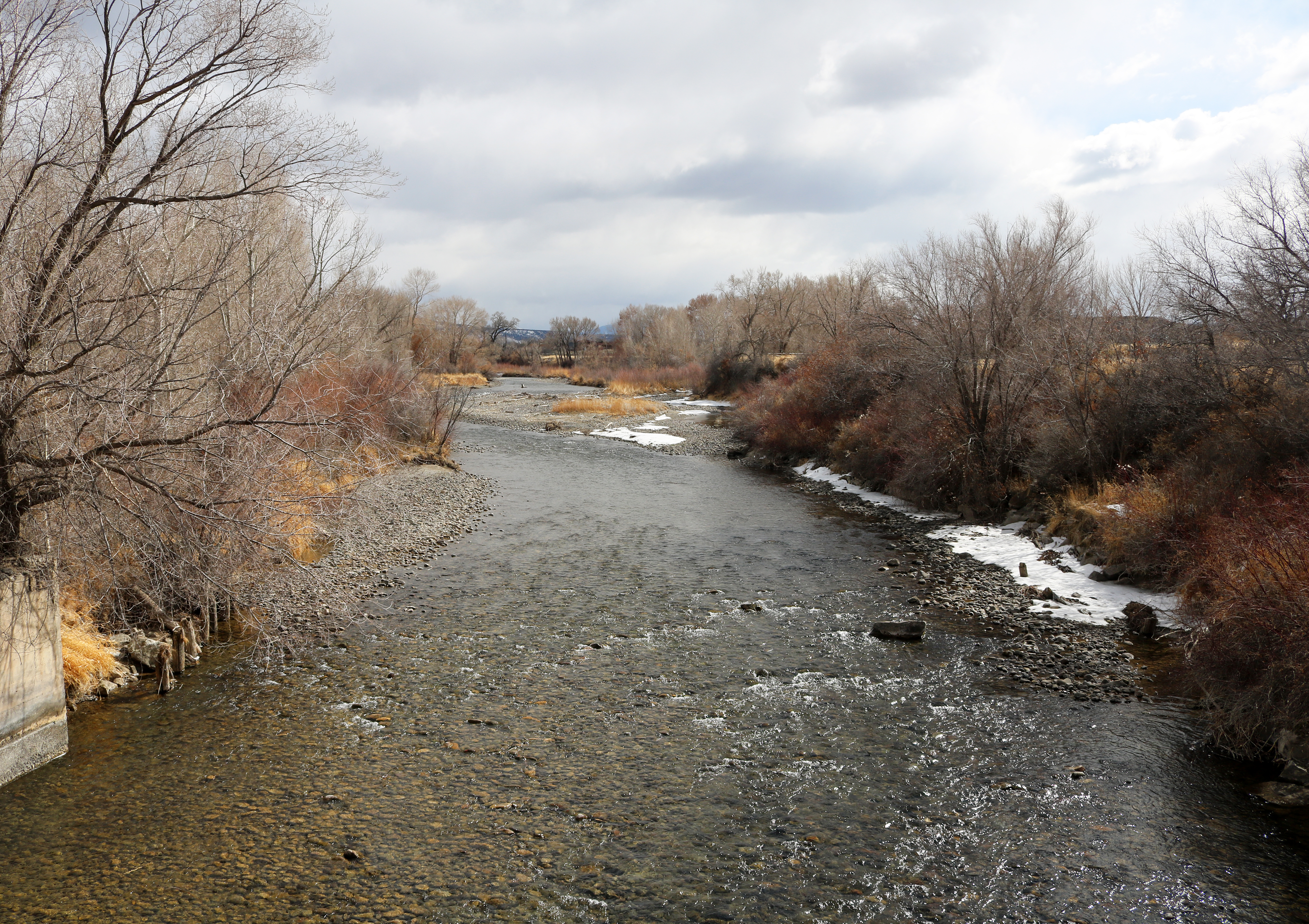
- The river in southern Montrose County.

Location
- Country: United States
- State: Colorado
- Cities: Ouray, Ridgway, Montrose, Olathe, Delta

Physical characteristics
- Source
  - location: near Ouray, San Juan County
  - coordinates: 37°55′09″N 107°37′11″W
  - elevation: 12,215 ft (3,723 m)
- Mouth: Gunnison River
  - location: Delta, Delta County
  - coordinates: 38°45′24″N 108°05′25″W
  - elevation: 4,915 ft (1,498 m)
- Length: 75 mi (121 km)
- Basin size: 1,114 mi^{2} (2,890 km^{2})
- Discharge
  - location: Delta, 1.1 mi (1.8 km) from the mouth
  - average: 304 cu ft/s (8.6 m^{3}/s)
  - minimum: 15 cu ft/s (0.42 m^{3}/s)
  - maximum: 5,800 cu ft/s (160 m^{3}/s)

Basin features
- Tributaries
  - left: Red Mountain Creek, Canyon Creek (Colorado), Dallas Creek, Dry Creek (Colorado)
  - right: Cow Creek, Cedar Creek (Colorado)

The Uncompahgre River is a tributary of the Gunnison River, approximately 75 mi (121 km) long, in southwestern Colorado in the United States. Lake Como at 12,215 ft (3,723 m) in northern San Juan County, in the Uncompahgre National Forest in the northwestern San Juan Mountains is the headwaters of the river. It flows northwest past Ouray, Ridgway, Montrose, and Olathe and joins the Gunnison at Confluence Park in Delta.

The river forms Poughkeepsie Gulch and the Uncompahgre Gorge. The major tributaries are all creeks draining the northwest San Juan Mountains.

There are two dams on the Uncompahgre River, a small diversion dam in the Uncompahgre Gorge, and Ridgway Dam below the town of Ridgway which forms Ridgway Reservoir.

The river is used for irrigation in the Uncompahgre Valley. Additionally, water from the Gunnison is diverted to the valley via the Gunnison Tunnel. The Uncompahgre is unnavigable except at high water.

The name Uncompahgre (/ʌnkʌmˈpɑːɡreɪ/) comes from the Ute word Uncompaghre, which loosely translates to "dirty water," "red lake," or "red water spring" and is likely a reference to the many hot springs in the vicinity of Ouray.

== Conservation ==
In October 2020, the City of Montrose announced a multi-year, multi-million dollar river restoration project along the Uncompahgre, including $785,000 total grants from the Colorado Water Conservation Board. The project will enhance fishing habitats, provide bank stabilization, increase river access and fishing opportunities for the public.

The public-private partnership includes Colorado Parks & Wildlife, Colorado Trout Unlimited, and fly fishing company Mayfly Outdoors.

== See also ==
- List of rivers of Colorado
- List of tributaries of the Colorado River
- Water Conservation
