= Portland, Ouray County, Colorado =

Census-designated place in Ouray County, CO, USA

Portland, Colorado
- Census-designated place
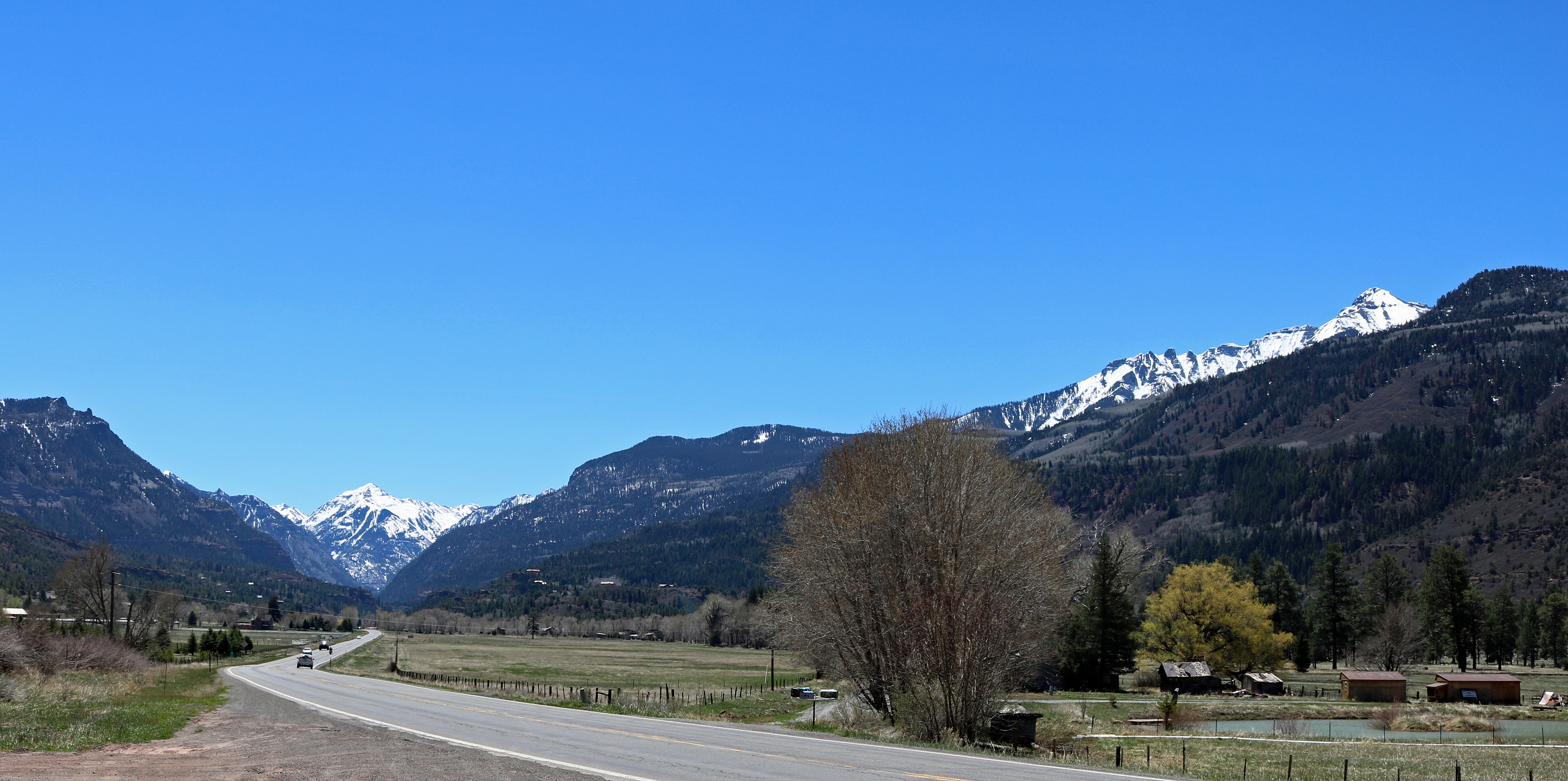
- Looking south along U.S. Route 550 in Portland.

- Location of the Portland CDP in Ouray County, Colorado
- Coordinates: 38°05′21″N 107°41′43″W
- Country: United States
- State: Colorado
- County: Ouray

Government
  - Type: Unincorporated community

Area
  - Total: 3.202 sq mi (8.293 km^{2})
  - Land: 3.202 sq mi (8.293 km^{2})
  - Water: 0 sq mi (0.000 km^{2})
- Elevation: 8,124 ft (2,476 m)

Population (2020)
  - Total: 136
  - Density: 42.5/sq mi (16.4/km^{2})
- Time zone: UTC-7 (MST)
  - Summer (DST): UTC-6 (MDT)
- ZIP Code: Ridgway 81432
- Area code: 970
- GNIS feature ID: 2583285

Portland is a census-designated place (CDP) located in and governed by Ouray County, Colorado, United States. The CDP is a part of the Montrose, CO Micropolitan Statistical Area. The population of the Portland CDP was 136 at the United States Census 2020. The Ridgway post office (Zip Code 81432) serves the area.

== Geography ==
Portland is located between Ridgway and Ouray.

The Portland CDP has an area of 2,049 acres (8.293 km^{2}), all land.

== Demographics ==
The United States Census Bureau initially defined the Portland CDP for the United States Census 2010.

Portland CDP, Colorado
Year	Pop.	±%
2010	135	—
2020	136	+0.7%
Source: United States Census Bureau

== See also ==
- List of census-designated places in Colorado
