= 1964 United States presidential election in Colorado =

- November 3, 1964

Nominee	Lyndon B. Johnson	Barry Goldwater
Party	Democratic	Republican
Home state	Texas	Arizona
Running mate	Hubert Humphrey	William E. Miller
Electoral vote	6	0
Popular vote	476,024	296,767
Percentage	61.27%	38.19%
County results
Johnson
50–60%
60–70%
70–80%
80–90%
Goldwater
50–60%
President before election
Lyndon B. Johnson
Democratic
Elected President
Lyndon B. Johnson
Democratic

The 1964 United States presidential election in Colorado took place on November 3, 1964, as part of the 1964 United States presidential election. State voters chose six representatives, or electors, to the Electoral College, who voted for president and vice president.

Colorado was won by incumbent President Lyndon B. Johnson (D–Texas), with 61.27% of the popular vote, against Senator Barry Goldwater (R–Arizona), with 38.19% of the popular vote.

As of the 2024 presidential election, this is the last election in which Archuleta County, Baca County, Crowley County, Custer County, Delta County, Douglas County, El Paso County, Fremont County, Grand County, Jackson County, Kiowa County, Kit Carson County, Lincoln County, Logan County, Mesa County, Moffat County, Montezuma County, Montrose County, Morgan County, Park County, Rio Blanco County, Rio Grande County, Sedgwick County, Teller County, Weld County, or Yuma County voted for a Democratic presidential candidate. This would be the last occasion until 1988 that a Democratic presidential nominee would carry Boulder or Saguache counties. Colorado as a whole, along with Larimer, Routt, Garfield, Eagle, Summit, Clear Creek, Gunnison, La Plata, Alamosa, and Otero counties would not would not back a Democrat in a presidential election again until 1992. San Juan County would not vote Democratic again until 2004, Arapahoe, Jefferson and Ouray counties would not vote Democratic again until 2008, and Chaffee County would not vote Democratic again until 2012. This was the last time until 2020 that a Democrat would carry Colorado by a double-digit margin.

== Results ==
1964 United States presidential election in Colorado
Party	Candidate	Running mate	Popular vote		Electoral vote	
Party	Candidate	Running mate	Count	%	Count	%
Democratic	Lyndon B. Johnson of Texas (incumbent)	Hubert Humphrey of Minnesota	476,024	61.27%	6	100.00%
Republican	Barry Goldwater of Arizona	William E. Miller of New York	296,767	38.19%	0	0.00%
Socialist Workers	Clifton DeBerry of Illinois	Ed Shaw of Michigan	2,537	0.33%	0	0.00%
Prohibition	Earle Harold Munn of Michigan	Mark R. Shaw of Massachusetts	1,356	0.17%	0	0.00%
Socialist Labor	Eric Hass of New York	Henning A. Blomen of Massachusetts	302	0.04%	0	0.00%
Total			776,986	100.00%	6	100.00%

=== By county ===
County	Lyndon B. Johnson Democratic		Barry Goldwater Republican		Clifton DeBerry Socialist Workers		E. Harold Munn Prohibition		Eric Hass Socialist Labor		Margin		Total votes cast
County	#	%	#	%	#	%	#	%	#	%	#	%	Total votes cast
Adams	35,498	68.99%	15,652	30.42%	218	0.42%	64	0.12%	22	0.04%	19,846	38.57%	51,454
Alamosa	2,481	62.40%	1,488	37.42%	1	0.03%	5	0.13%	1	0.03%	993	24.98%	3,976
Arapahoe	27,940	54.40%	23,071	44.92%	240	0.47%	86	0.17%	21	0.04%	4,869	9.48%	51,358
Archuleta	632	62.70%	370	36.71%	2	0.20%	4	0.40%	0	0.00%	262	25.99%	1,008
Baca	1,366	52.18%	1,241	47.40%	1	0.04%	7	0.27%	3	0.11%	125	4.78%	2,618
Bent	1,737	64.43%	937	34.76%	2	0.07%	19	0.70%	1	0.04%	800	29.67%	2,696
Boulder	22,737	56.38%	17,373	43.08%	122	0.30%	82	0.20%	16	0.04%	5,364	13.30%	40,330
Chaffee	2,463	62.34%	1,476	37.36%	3	0.08%	7	0.18%	2	0.05%	987	24.98%	3,951
Cheyenne	735	57.29%	545	42.48%	1	0.08%	2	0.16%	0	0.00%	190	14.81%	1,283
Clear Creek	1,086	61.46%	676	38.26%	1	0.06%	3	0.17%	1	0.06%	410	23.20%	1,767
Conejos	2,033	66.09%	1,031	33.52%	6	0.20%	4	0.13%	2	0.07%	1,002	32.57%	3,076
Costilla	1,284	80.81%	299	18.82%	1	0.06%	2	0.13%	3	0.19%	985	61.99%	1,589
Crowley	967	58.15%	690	41.49%	4	0.24%	2	0.12%	0	0.00%	277	16.66%	1,663
Custer	406	52.93%	358	46.68%	1	0.13%	2	0.26%	0	0.00%	48	6.25%	767
Delta	3,927	57.53%	2,883	42.24%	1	0.01%	13	0.19%	2	0.03%	1,044	15.29%	6,826
Denver	143,480	65.73%	73,279	33.57%	1,045	0.48%	381	0.17%	103	0.05%	70,201	32.16%	218,288
Dolores	496	60.64%	322	39.36%	0	0.00%	0	0.00%	0	0.00%	174	21.28%	818
Douglas	1,442	51.67%	1,336	47.87%	3	0.11%	6	0.21%	4	0.14%	106	3.80%	2,791
Eagle	1,299	66.79%	644	33.11%	1	0.05%	1	0.05%	0	0.00%	655	33.68%	1,945
El Paso	27,844	53.75%	23,822	45.98%	37	0.07%	94	0.18%	10	0.02%	4,022	7.77%	51,807
Elbert	857	48.01%	924	51.76%	4	0.22%	0	0.00%	0	0.00%	-67	-3.75%	1,785
Fremont	5,181	57.01%	3,875	42.64%	8	0.09%	23	0.25%	1	0.01%	1,306	14.37%	9,088
Garfield	3,196	58.24%	2,282	41.58%	2	0.04%	6	0.11%	2	0.04%	914	16.66%	5,488
Gilpin	363	60.50%	233	38.83%	1	0.17%	1	0.17%	2	0.33%	130	21.67%	600
Grand	902	52.32%	814	47.22%	8	0.46%	0	0.00%	0	0.00%	88	5.10%	1,724
Gunnison	1,540	63.04%	903	36.96%	0	0.00%	0	0.00%	0	0.00%	637	26.08%	2,443
Hinsdale	94	46.77%	107	53.23%	0	0.00%	0	0.00%	0	0.00%	-13	-6.46%	201
Huerfano	2,734	75.23%	895	24.63%	4	0.11%	1	0.03%	0	0.00%	1,839	50.60%	3,634
Jackson	384	51.82%	354	47.77%	1	0.13%	1	0.13%	1	0.13%	30	4.05%	741
Jefferson	43,162	56.19%	33,398	43.48%	122	0.16%	110	0.14%	20	0.03%	9,764	12.71%	76,812
Kiowa	701	54.77%	579	45.23%	0	0.00%	0	0.00%	0	0.00%	122	9.54%	1,280
Kit Carson	1,906	58.95%	1,316	40.71%	2	0.06%	8	0.25%	1	0.03%	590	18.24%	3,233
La Plata	4,442	55.48%	3,550	44.34%	3	0.04%	12	0.15%	0	0.00%	892	11.14%	8,007
Lake	2,362	77.42%	681	22.32%	2	0.07%	5	0.16%	1	0.03%	1,681	55.10%	3,051
Larimer	12,776	51.97%	11,636	47.33%	96	0.39%	64	0.26%	13	0.05%	1,140	4.64%	24,585
Las Animas	6,591	77.97%	1,833	21.68%	9	0.11%	12	0.14%	8	0.09%	4,758	56.29%	8,453
Lincoln	1,327	54.41%	1,104	45.26%	8	0.33%	0	0.00%	0	0.00%	223	9.15%	2,439
Logan	4,222	54.61%	3,497	45.23%	5	0.06%	7	0.09%	0	0.00%	725	9.38%	7,731
Mesa	12,716	60.32%	8,317	39.45%	8	0.04%	38	0.18%	3	0.01%	4,399	20.87%	21,082
Mineral	204	69.15%	89	30.17%	1	0.34%	1	0.34%	0	0.00%	115	38.98%	295
Moffat	1,657	53.40%	1,438	46.34%	7	0.23%	1	0.03%	0	0.00%	219	7.06%	3,103
Montezuma	2,686	56.69%	2,035	42.95%	2	0.04%	12	0.25%	3	0.06%	651	13.74%	4,738
Montrose	4,009	59.76%	2,678	39.92%	8	0.12%	10	0.15%	4	0.06%	1,331	19.84%	6,709
Morgan	4,271	56.80%	3,228	42.93%	2	0.03%	18	0.24%	1	0.01%	1,043	13.87%	7,520
Otero	5,999	62.26%	3,605	37.41%	3	0.03%	27	0.28%	2	0.02%	2,394	24.85%	9,636
Ouray	456	55.61%	358	43.66%	3	0.37%	3	0.37%	0	0.00%	98	11.95%	820
Park	515	51.04%	493	48.86%	1	0.10%	0	0.00%	0	0.00%	22	2.18%	1,009
Phillips	1,243	55.00%	1,012	44.78%	5	0.22%	0	0.00%	0	0.00%	231	10.22%	2,260
Pitkin	958	63.70%	540	35.90%	2	0.13%	3	0.20%	1	0.07%	418	27.80%	1,504
Prowers	3,759	64.57%	2,044	35.11%	5	0.09%	14	0.24%	0	0.00%	1,715	29.46%	5,822
Pueblo	34,933	71.97%	13,103	27.00%	397	0.82%	86	0.18%	17	0.04%	21,830	44.97%	48,536
Rio Blanco	1,134	52.70%	1,015	47.17%	1	0.05%	1	0.05%	1	0.05%	119	5.53%	2,152
Rio Grande	2,161	55.88%	1,699	43.94%	1	0.03%	6	0.16%	0	0.00%	462	11.94%	3,867
Routt	1,853	62.52%	1,095	36.94%	4	0.13%	8	0.27%	4	0.13%	758	25.58%	2,964
Saguache	1,099	63.71%	622	36.06%	2	0.12%	1	0.06%	1	0.06%	477	27.65%	1,725
San Juan	278	68.30%	129	31.70%	0	0.00%	0	0.00%	0	0.00%	149	36.60%	407
San Miguel	636	65.57%	332	34.23%	1	0.10%	1	0.10%	0	0.00%	304	31.34%	970
Sedgwick	942	51.22%	895	48.67%	1	0.05%	1	0.05%	0	0.00%	47	2.55%	1,839
Summit	483	58.33%	344	41.55%	1	0.12%	0	0.00%	0	0.00%	139	16.78%	828
Teller	685	54.19%	577	45.65%	1	0.08%	1	0.08%	0	0.00%	108	8.54%	1,264
Washington	1,341	48.25%	1,434	51.60%	4	0.14%	0	0.00%	0	0.00%	-93	-3.35%	2,779
Weld	17,268	58.18%	12,204	41.12%	147	0.50%	43	0.14%	17	0.06%	5,064	17.06%	29,679
Yuma	2,145	51.43%	2,007	48.12%	2	0.05%	16	0.38%	1	0.02%	138	3.31%	4,171
Total	476,024	61.27%	296,767	38.19%	2,537	0.33%	1,356	0.17%	302	0.04%	179,257	23.08%	776,986

==== Counties that flipped from Republican to Democratic ====
- Grand
- Rio Blanco
- Jackson
- Moffat
- Douglas
- Yuma
- Montezuma
- Boulder
- Weld
- Sedgwick
- Larimer
- Routt
- Garfield
- Eagle
- Summit
- Jefferson
- Clear Creek
- Gilpin
- Arapahoe
- Chaffee
- Gunnison
- Pitkin
- Dolores
- Ouray
- La Plata
- Rio Grande
- Huerfano
- Alamosa
- Bent
- Otero
- Baca
- Cheyenne
- Mesa
- Delta
- Montrose
- Park
- Fremont
- Custer
- El Paso
- Teller
- Morgan
- Logan
- Crowley
- Phillips
- Lincoln
- Prowers
- Kit Carson
- Kiowa
