= Gunnison Tunnel =

- U.S. National Register of Historic Places
- Location within Colorado Location within the United States
- Location: Montrose County, Colorado, USA
- Nearest city: Montrose, Colorado
- Coordinates: 38.484022°N 107.743791°W
- Area: 373.3 acres (1.511 km^{2})
- Built: 1901
- Built by: U.S. Reclamation Service
- NRHP reference No.: 79000616
- Added to NRHP: July 22, 1979

The Gunnison Tunnel is an irrigation tunnel constructed between 1905 and 1909 by the U.S. Bureau of Reclamation in Montrose County, Colorado. The 5.8-mile-long (9.3 km) tunnel diverts water from the Gunnison River to the arid Uncompahgre Valley around Montrose, Colorado.

== History ==
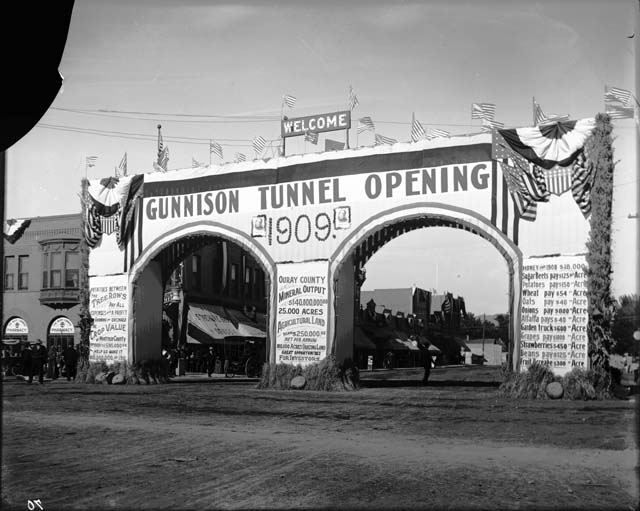
Celebration on opening of the Gunnison Tunnel, 1909 (in Montrose, not at the tunnel itself)

At the time of its completion, it was the longest irrigation tunnel in the world and quickly made the area around Montrose into profitable agricultural lands. In 1972, the tunnel was designated a National Historic Civil Engineering Landmark by the American Society of Civil Engineers (ASCE).

The idea for a tunnel is credited to Frank Lauzon, a miner and prospector. By the early 1890s he was farming in Montrose. Popular lore is that idea came to him in a dream that the waters of the Gunnison River should be brought to the valley. In the late 1890s, the campaign for the tunnel was led by Omer Madison Kem. National funding was approved in 1902.

As construction was undertaken, two advances in technology made work safer and easier. Jackhammers fed by a compressor replaced hand-turned drill bits to set holes for blasting charges. Dynamite replaced black powder for blasting. By 1906 shifts of workers up to 30 at a time worked in the tunnel.

The tunnel opened in 1909 to much fanfare with a dedication ceremony attended by President William Howard Taft.

It was listed on the National Register of Historic Places in 1979.

The tunnel is 5.8 miles (9.3 km) long and is 11 by 12 feet (3.4 m × 3.7 m) in cross-section, with square corners at the bottom and an arched roof. It drops about 40 feet (12 m) over its length. At the deepest, it is about 2,200 feet (670 m) beneath the surface of Vernal Mesa.

In 2009, some communities in the Uncompahgre Valley, celebrated the centennial anniversary of the Gunnison Tunnel opening.

== See also ==
- List of Historic Civil Engineering Landmarks
- List of tunnels documented by the Historic American Engineering Record in Colorado
