= Colona, Colorado =

Unincorporated community in Colorado, US

- Census-designated place
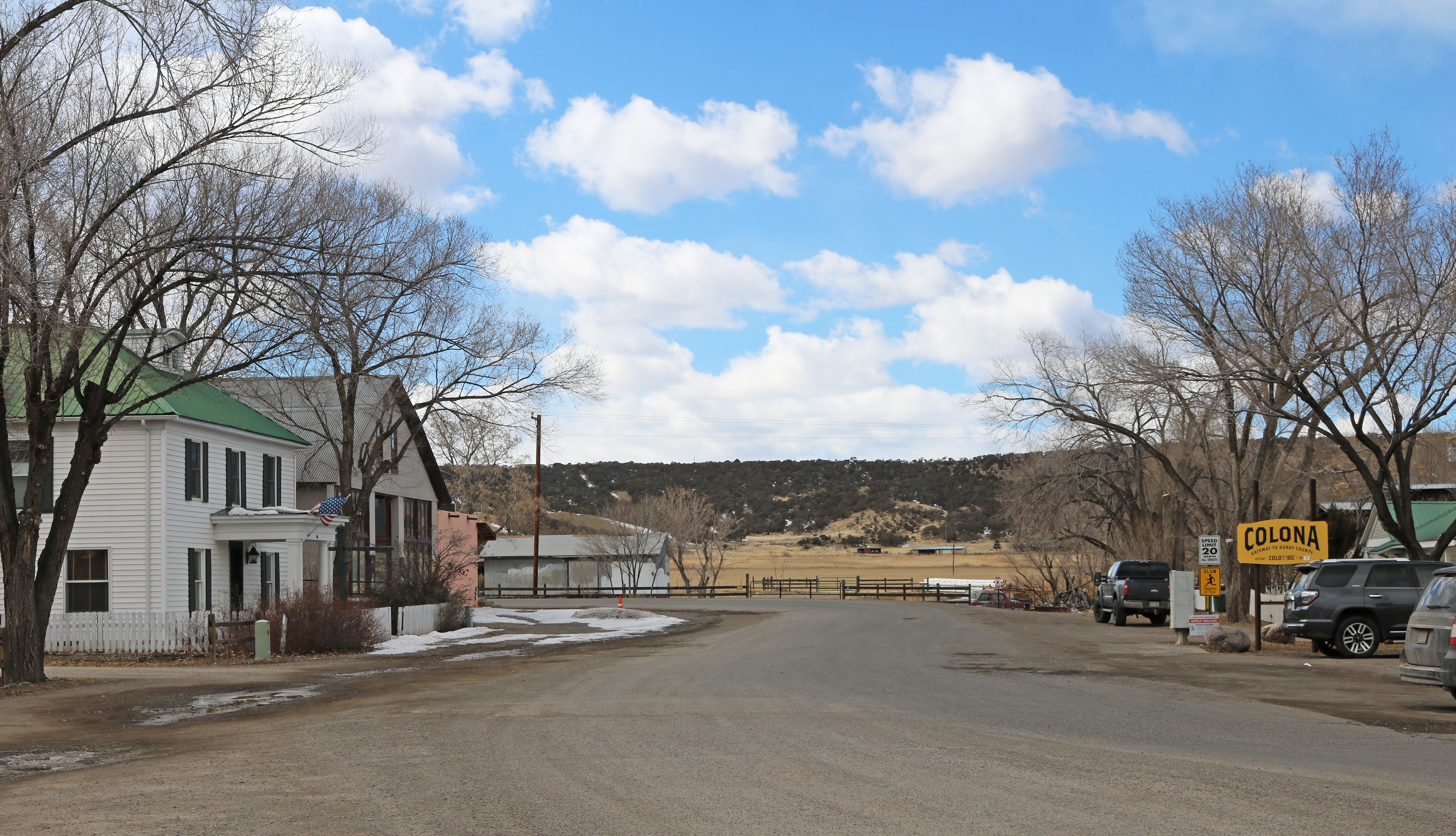
- Hotchkiss Avenue in Colona, February 2020

- Location of the Colona CDP in Ouray County, Colorado
- Coordinates: 38°19′39″N 107°46′46″W
- Country: United States
- State: Colorado
- County: Ouray
- Founded: 1887

Government
  - Type: Unincorporated community
  - Body: Ouray County

Area
  - Total: 0.061 sq mi (0.157 km^{2})
  - Land: 0.061 sq mi (0.157 km^{2})
  - Water: 0 sq mi (0.000 km^{2})
- Elevation: 6,385 ft (1,946 m)

Population (2020)
  - Total: 36
  - Density: 590/sq mi (230/km^{2})
- Time zone: UTC−07:00 (MST)
  - Summer (DST): UTC−06:00 (MDT)
- ZIP code: Montrose 81401
- Area codes: 970/748
- GNIS CDP ID: 2583224
- FIPS code: 08-15825

Colona is an unincorporated community and a census-designated place (CDP) located in Ouray County, Colorado, United States. The CDP is a part of the Montrose, CO Micropolitan Statistical Area. The population of the Colona CDP was 36 at the time of the United States Census 2020.

== History ==
The Colona, Colorado, post office operated from October 19, 1891, until March 15, 1943. The Montrose, Colorado, post office (ZIP code 81401) now serves the area. Colona is a name derived from Spanish meaning "colonist".

== Geography ==
The Colona CDP has an area of 39 acres (0.157 km^{2}), all land.

== Demographics ==
The United States Census Bureau initially defined the Colona CDP for the United States Census 2010.

Colona CDP, Colorado
Year	Pop.	±%
2010	30	—
2020	36	+20.0%
Source: United States Census Bureau

== See also ==
- List of census-designated places in Colorado
