= 1936 United States presidential election in Colorado =

- November 3, 1936

Nominee	Franklin D. Roosevelt	Alf Landon
Party	Democratic	Republican
Home state	New York	Kansas
Running mate	John Nance Garner	Frank Knox
Electoral vote	6	0
Popular vote	295,021	181,267
Percentage	60.37%	37.09%
County results
Roosevelt
40–50%
50–60%
60–70%
70–80%
Landon
40–50%
50–60%

The 1936 United States presidential election in Colorado took place on November 3, 1936, as part of the 1936 United States presidential election. Voters chose six representatives, or electors to the Electoral College, who voted for president and vice president.

Colorado voted for the Democratic candidate Franklin D. Roosevelt over Republican candidate Alf Landon. Roosevelt won Colorado by a margin of 23.28%, carrying every county except Elbert, Kit Carson and Rio Blanco.

As of the 2024 presidential election, this is the last occasion when Washington County and Hinsdale County voted for a Democratic presidential candidate. The state would vote Republican in 14 of the next 17 presidential elections, with Democrats achieving a majority of the vote twice in that period.

== Results ==
1936 United States presidential election in Colorado
Party	Candidate	Running mate	Votes	%	Electoral votes
Democratic	Franklin D. Roosevelt	John Nance Garner	295,021	60.37%	6
Republican	Alf Landon	Frank Knox	181,267	37.09%	0
Union	William Lemke	Thomas C. O'Brien	9,962	2.04%	0
Socialist	Norman Thomas	George A. Nelson	1,593	0.33%	0
Communist	Earl Browder	James W. Ford	497	0.10%	0
Socialist Labor	John W. Aiken	Edward A. Teichert	344	0.07%	0
Total			488,684	100.0%	6

=== Results by county ===
County	Franklin Delano Roosevelt Democratic		Alfred Mossman Landon Republican		William Frederick Lemke Union		Norman Mattoon Thomas Socialist		Various candidates Other parties		Margin	
County	%	#	%	#	%	#	%	#	%	#	%	#
Lake	76.02%	2,146	23.03%	650	0.43%	12	0.25%	7	0.28%	8	52.99%	1,496
San Juan	74.94%	622	23.61%	196	0.96%	8	0.24%	2	0.24%	2	51.33%	426
Las Animas	75.08%	10,220	24.49%	3,333	0.25%	34	0.10%	14	0.08%	11	50.60%	6,887
Teller	69.74%	2,349	27.91%	940	1.45%	49	0.77%	26	0.12%	4	41.83%	1,409
Alamosa	68.87%	2,754	29.71%	1,188	1.15%	46	0.10%	4	0.18%	7	39.16%	1,566
Gilpin	68.34%	736	29.81%	321	1.67%	18	0.19%	2	0.00%	0	38.53%	415
Mineral	68.35%	285	30.22%	126	1.44%	6	0.00%	0	0.00%	0	38.13%	159
Chaffee	66.78%	2,447	29.18%	1,069	3.38%	124	0.49%	18	0.16%	6	37.61%	1,378
Gunnison	67.78%	2,179	30.42%	978	1.03%	33	0.59%	19	0.19%	6	37.36%	1,201
Pitkin	65.38%	659	30.26%	305	3.97%	40	0.10%	1	0.30%	3	35.12%	354
Huerfano	67.17%	4,793	32.22%	2,299	0.38%	27	0.13%	9	0.11%	8	34.95%	2,494
Mesa	63.10%	7,824	29.47%	3,654	6.86%	851	0.40%	49	0.17%	21	33.63%	4,170
Eagle	65.66%	1,541	33.06%	776	0.51%	12	0.38%	9	0.38%	9	32.59%	765
Denver	65.09%	99,263	33.28%	50,743	1.12%	1,711	0.33%	498	0.18%	277	31.82%	48,520
San Miguel	63.80%	860	32.12%	433	3.49%	47	0.45%	6	0.15%	2	31.68%	427
Clear Creek	64.55%	1,340	34.68%	720	0.63%	13	0.14%	3	0.00%	0	29.87%	620
Summit	64.50%	496	34.85%	268	0.26%	2	0.39%	3	0.00%	0	29.65%	228
Pueblo	63.85%	18,660	34.46%	10,071	1.37%	399	0.19%	56	0.13%	38	29.39%	8,589
Conejos	63.26%	2,347	35.18%	1,305	0.70%	26	0.40%	15	0.46%	17	28.09%	1,042
Park	63.32%	1,336	35.36%	746	0.95%	20	0.24%	5	0.14%	3	27.96%	590
Routt	61.57%	2,817	33.68%	1,541	3.76%	172	0.66%	30	0.33%	15	27.89%	1,276
Phillips	61.54%	1,602	36.15%	941	1.42%	37	0.81%	21	0.08%	2	25.39%	661
Costilla	60.62%	1,518	37.14%	930	1.64%	41	0.24%	6	0.36%	9	23.48%	588
Ouray	60.66%	677	38.35%	428	0.45%	5	0.45%	5	0.09%	1	22.31%	249
Adams	59.69%	4,865	38.33%	3,124	1.58%	129	0.33%	27	0.07%	6	21.36%	1,741
Arapahoe	58.09%	6,489	38.24%	4,272	2.86%	320	0.64%	71	0.17%	19	19.85%	2,217
Otero	59.10%	5,775	39.49%	3,859	1.17%	114	0.16%	16	0.08%	8	19.61%	1,916
Montezuma	56.49%	1,579	38.89%	1,087	3.61%	101	0.72%	20	0.29%	8	17.60%	492
El Paso	56.84%	15,652	39.82%	10,965	2.92%	804	0.31%	84	0.12%	32	17.02%	4,687
Dolores	55.50%	323	38.66%	225	1.72%	10	0.17%	1	3.95%	23	16.84%	98
Archuleta	57.09%	761	40.59%	541	1.88%	25	0.38%	5	0.08%	1	16.50%	220
Bent	57.25%	1,821	40.84%	1,299	1.73%	55	0.13%	4	0.06%	2	16.41%	522
Sedgwick	56.40%	1,358	40.57%	977	2.82%	68	0.12%	3	0.08%	2	15.82%	381
Jefferson	56.79%	7,283	41.10%	5,271	1.46%	187	0.35%	45	0.30%	39	15.69%	2,012
Baca	55.06%	1,797	39.46%	1,288	4.93%	161	0.40%	13	0.15%	5	15.59%	509
Rio Grande	56.90%	2,574	41.64%	1,884	1.19%	54	0.20%	9	0.07%	3	15.25%	690
Weld	55.77%	12,993	41.23%	9,606	2.55%	594	0.31%	72	0.13%	31	14.54%	3,387
Boulder	55.93%	9,788	41.39%	7,244	2.02%	354	0.59%	103	0.07%	12	14.54%	2,544
Montrose	54.16%	2,938	41.44%	2,248	3.47%	188	0.57%	31	0.37%	20	12.72%	690
Logan	55.30%	4,070	42.61%	3,136	1.75%	129	0.31%	23	0.03%	2	12.69%	934
La Plata	54.49%	3,040	42.19%	2,354	2.85%	159	0.11%	6	0.36%	20	12.30%	686
Custer	55.25%	674	43.11%	526	0.82%	10	0.66%	8	0.16%	2	12.13%	148
Crowley	54.50%	1,163	43.11%	920	1.87%	40	0.28%	6	0.23%	5	11.39%	243
Saguache	54.01%	1,321	43.79%	1,071	1.92%	47	0.08%	2	0.20%	5	10.22%	250
Garfield	53.14%	2,406	42.95%	1,945	3.51%	159	0.20%	9	0.20%	9	10.18%	461
Fremont	52.84%	4,471	42.91%	3,631	3.92%	332	0.21%	18	0.11%	9	9.93%	840
Washington	53.29%	2,071	44.34%	1,723	2.11%	82	0.18%	7	0.08%	3	8.96%	348
Delta	49.94%	3,230	41.14%	2,661	8.21%	531	0.57%	37	0.14%	9	8.80%	569
Kiowa	53.00%	918	44.57%	772	1.73%	30	0.46%	8	0.23%	4	8.43%	146
Grand	53.95%	846	45.54%	714	0.38%	6	0.13%	2	0.00%	0	8.42%	132
Prowers	52.28%	2,896	43.91%	2,432	3.56%	197	0.11%	6	0.14%	8	8.38%	464
Cheyenne	52.81%	903	44.85%	767	1.70%	29	0.41%	7	0.23%	4	7.95%	136
Yuma	52.90%	2,878	45.26%	2,462	0.55%	30	0.53%	29	0.75%	41	7.65%	416
Lincoln	52.48%	1,660	44.89%	1,420	2.37%	75	0.16%	5	0.09%	3	7.59%	240
Douglas	53.05%	1,044	45.48%	895	0.10%	2	0.30%	6	1.07%	21	7.57%	149
Moffat	48.14%	1,090	42.14%	954	9.28%	210	0.35%	8	0.09%	2	6.01%	136
Hinsdale	50.74%	137	47.78%	129	1.48%	4	0.00%	0	0.00%	0	2.96%	8
Larimer	49.41%	7,521	47.59%	7,243	2.56%	390	0.35%	53	0.09%	14	1.83%	278
Jackson	48.87%	433	47.29%	419	3.61%	32	0.11%	1	0.11%	1	1.58%	14
Morgan	48.54%	3,146	47.18%	3,058	3.95%	256	0.25%	16	0.08%	5	1.36%	88
Elbert	47.51%	1,319	49.50%	1,374	2.74%	76	0.14%	4	0.11%	3	-1.98%	-55
Kit Carson	44.35%	1,730	50.76%	1,980	4.56%	178	0.31%	12	0.03%	1	-6.41%	-250
Rio Blanco	39.45%	587	55.78%	830	4.50%	67	0.13%	2	0.13%	2	-16.33%	-243

==== Counties that flipped from Democratic to Republican ====
- Elbert
- Kit Carson
- Rio Blanco

==== Counties that flipped from Republican to Democratic ====
- El Paso
- Larimer
- Morgan
