= Uncompahgre Valley =

River Valley in Colorado

Coordinates: 38°28′N 107°53′W

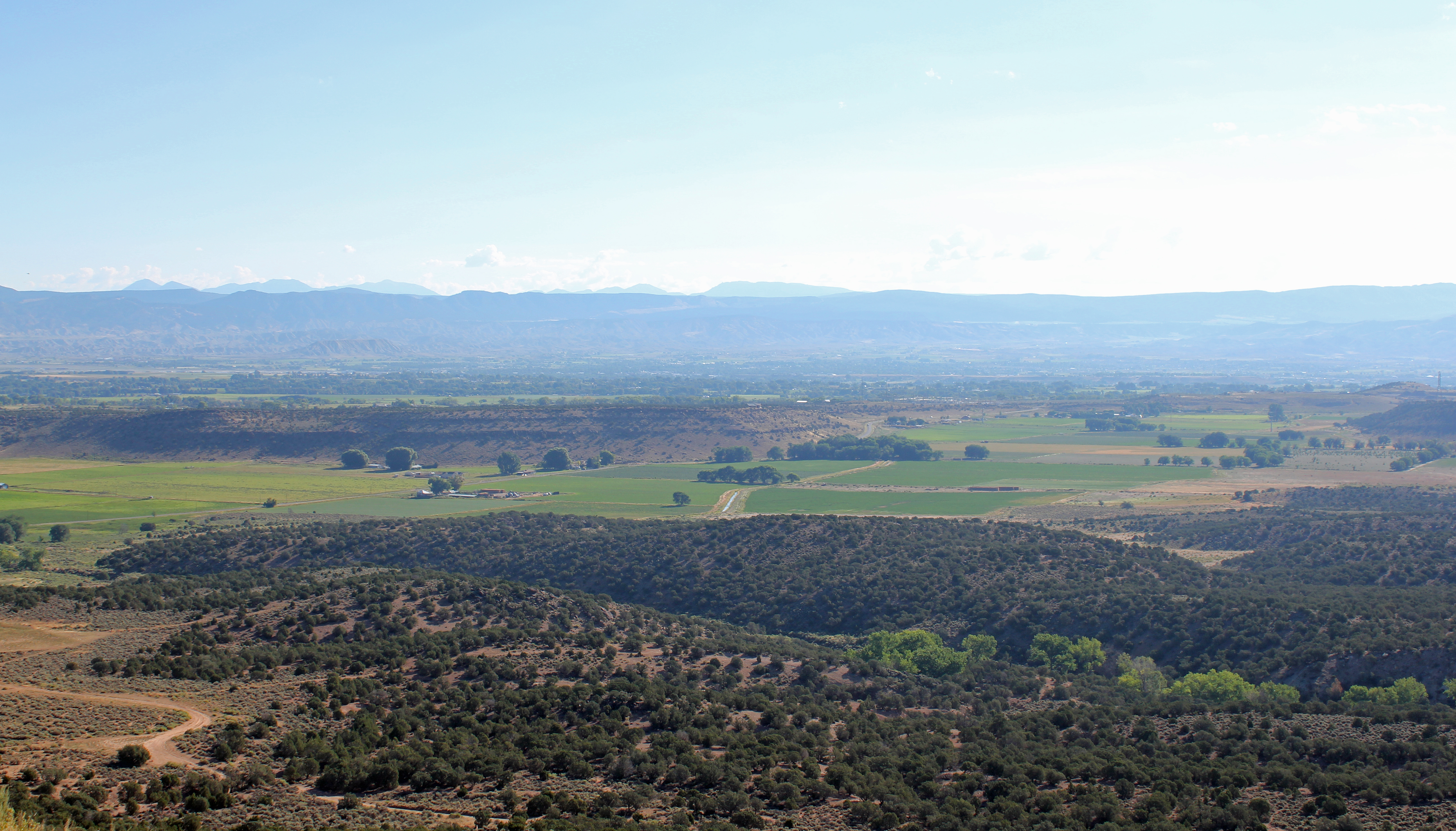
A view of the valley on a hazy day in 2014.

The Uncompahgre Valley is an agricultural valley of the Uncompahgre River around the town of Montrose in the western part of the U.S. state of Colorado. The valley is bounded to the south and east by the San Juan Mountains and to the west by the Uncompahgre Plateau. The valley contains about 135,000 acres of irrigable land, is 35 miles long, and approximately 12 miles wide.

The Uncompahgre Valley was originally home to the Utes who were removed to Utah in 1881. Agriculture in the Uncompahgre Valley was made possible by the construction of the Gunnison Tunnel, which diverted irrigation water from the Gunnison River in the Black Canyon of the Gunnison. This augmented irrigation waters from the Uncompahgre River, which could run low in summer after the spring snowmelt.
