= Ridgway State Park =

State park in Colorado, United States

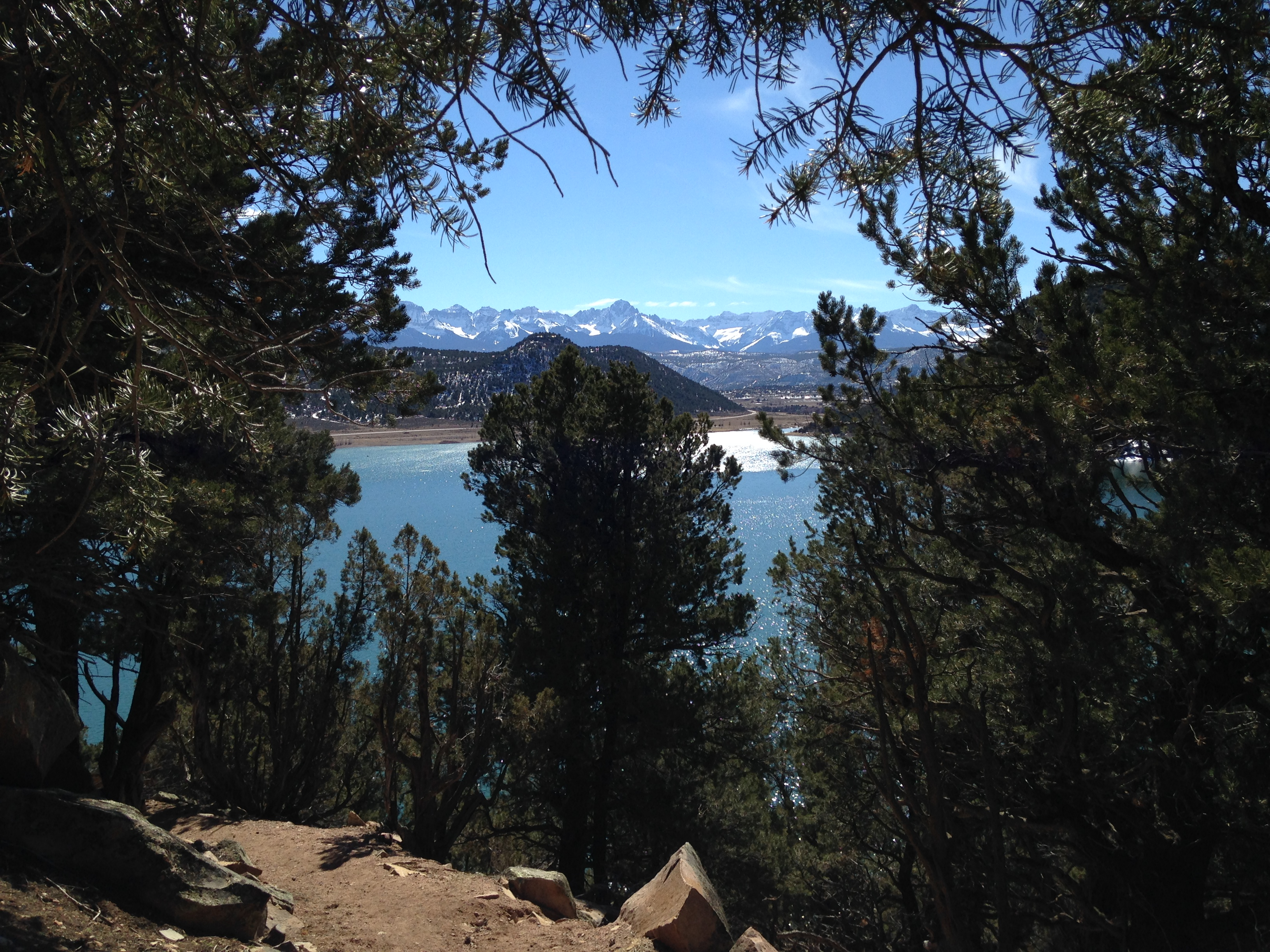
- Ridgway State Park, February 2014

- Location within Colorado
- Location: Ouray County, Colorado, USA
- Nearest city: Montrose, CO
- Coordinates: 38°12′45″N 107°44′03″W
- Area: 3,201 acres (12.95 km^{2})
- Established: 1989
- Visitors: 740,485 (in 2021)
- Governing body: Colorado Parks and Wildlife

Ridgway State Park is a state park located in Ouray County, Colorado, United States. The park is 21 miles southeast of Montrose, 14 miles northeast of Ouray, 4 miles north of the town of Ridgway and 312 miles southwest of Denver. The wildlife consists of deer, mountain lions, coyotes, rabbits, and elk. Due to the park's variety of animal life, the park is used as a hunting ground although hunting opportunities are extremely limited due to proximity to developed areas.

== Facilities ==
Three entrances to the park provide a range of options. Dallas Creek is a day-use only area, with facilities for picnicking, fishing in the summer, although it is not recommended. Dutch Charlie (the second entrance to the state park) contains the camping facilities. Yurts and cabins are available for rent nightly. Two yurts are wheelchair accessible. Tent sites with full RV hook-ups are available. Several tent sites are wheelchair accessible. Lake access includes a marina for long-term stays, boats docks, and a swim beach for children. Nature and hiking trails dot the area around the lake featuring great views of the Cimarron Range of the San Juan Mountains. One trail leads through all of the parks' areas and back. Several portions of the trails provide wheelchair access, including trails to fishing ponds. The third entrance is most visited for its fishing. Pa-co-chu-puk has an assortment of fishing areas, including two ponds connected to Ridgway reservoir. Brown, rainbow, and cutthroat trout are commonly caught at Pa-co-chu-puk.

== See also ==
- Ridgway Dam
