= List of ZIP Codes in Colorado =

Coordinates: 38.9972°N 105.5478°W

The location of the State of Colorado in the United States of America.

The United States Postal Service has currently designated 640 5-digit ZIP Codes for the U.S. State of Colorado. Introduced on July 1, 1963, the Postal Service designated 5-digit ZIP Code for the entire United States and its territories to expedite mail delivery. Colorado 5-digit ZIP Codes currently range from 80001 for Arvada to 81658 for Vail.

== Colorado ZIP Codes ==
The following sortable table comprises the current 5-digit ZIP Codes designated for Colorado. (Note: The United States Postal Service updates 5-digit ZIP Codes as needed.)

Colorado 5-Digit ZIP Codes
City name	ZIP Code	Primary postal station
Agate	80101	Agate Post Office
Aguilar	81020	Aguilar Post Office
Akron	80720	Akron Post Office
Alamosa	81101	Alamosa Post Office
Alamosa	81102	Alamosa Post Office
Allenspark	80510	Allenspark Post Office
Alma	80420	Alma Post Office
Almont	81210	Almont Post Office
Amherst	80721	Amherst Post Office
Anton	80801	Anton Post Office
Antonito	81120	Antonito Post Office
Arapahoe	80802	Arapahoe Post Office
Arboles	81121	Arboles Post Office
Arlington	81021	Haswell Post Office
Aroya	80862	Wild Horse Post Office
Arriba	80804	Arriba Post Office
Arvada	80001	Arvada Post Office
Arvada	80002	Arvada Post Office
Arvada	80003	Indian Tree Station
Arvada	80004	Arvada Post Office
Arvada	80005	Indian Tree Station
Arvada	80006	Indian Tree Station
Arvada	80007	Indian Tree Station
Arvada	80403	Golden Sorting and Distribution Center
Aspen	81611	Aspen Post Office
Aspen	81612	Aspen Post Office
Atwood	80722	Atwood Post Office
Ault	80610	Ault Post Office
Aurora	80010	Hoffman Heights Station
Aurora	80011	Hoffman Heights Station
Aurora	80012	Gateway Station
Aurora	80013	Aurora Post Office
Aurora	80014	Gateway Station
Aurora	80015	Tower Station
Aurora	80016	Tower Station
Aurora	80017	Aurora Post Office
Aurora	80018	Aurora Post Office
Aurora	80019	Aurora Post Office
Aurora	80040	Fletcher Station
Aurora	80041	Hoffman Heights Station
Aurora	80042	Altura Station
Aurora	80044	Gateway Station
Aurora	80045	Hoffman Heights Station
Aurora	80046	Tower Station
Aurora	80047	Aurora Post Office
Aurora	80247	Sullivan Station
Austin	81410	Austin Post Office
Avon	81620	Avon Post Office
Avondale	81022	Avondale Post Office
Bailey	80421	Bailey Post Office
Basalt	81621	Basalt Post Office
Battlement Mesa	81635	Parachute Post Office
Battlement Mesa	81636	Parachute Post Office
Bayfield	81122	Bayfield Post Office
Bedrock	81411	Bedrock Post Office
Bellvue	80512	Bellvue Post Office
Bennett	80102	Bennett Post Office
Berthoud	80513	Berthoud Post Office
Bethune	80805	Bethune Post Office
Beulah	81023	Beulah Post Office
Black Hawk	80422	Black Hawk Post Office
Blanca	81123	Blanca Post Office
Blue River	80424	Breckenridge Post Office
Boncarbo	81024	Trinidad Post Office
Bond	80423	McCoy Post Office
Boone	81025	Boone Post Office
Boulder	80301	Valmont Station
Boulder	80302	Boulder Post Office
Boulder	80303	Valmont Station
Boulder	80304	Valmont Station
Boulder	80305	High Mar Station
Boulder	80306	Boulder Post Office
Boulder	80307	High Mar Station
Boulder	80308	Valmont Station
Boulder	80309	Boulder Post Office
Boulder	80310	Valmont Station
Bow Mar	80123	Columbine Hills Station
Boyero	80821	Hugo Post Office
Brandon	81071	Sheridan Lake Post Office
Branson	81027	Branson Post Office
Breckenridge	80424	Breckenridge Post Office
Briggsdale	80611	Briggsdale Post Office
Brighton	80601	Brighton Post Office
Brighton	80602	Brighton Annex
Brighton	80603	Brighton Post Office
Brighton	80640	Henderson Post Office
Bristol	81047	Holly Post Office
Brookside	81212	Cañon City Post Office
Broomfield	80020	Broomfield Post Office
Broomfield	80021	Eagle View Station
Broomfield	80023	Broomfield Post Office
Broomfield	80038	Broomfield Post Office
Brush	80723	Brush Post Office
Buena Vista	81211	Buena Vista Post Office
Buffalo Creek	80425	Buffalo Creek Post Office
Burlington	80807	Burlington Post Office
Burns	80426	Burns Post Office
Byers	80103	Byers Post Office
Cahone	81320	Cahone Post Office
Calhan	80808	Calhan Post Office
Campo	81029	Campo Post Office
Cañon City	81212	Cañon City Post Office
Cañon City	81215	Cañon City Post Office
Capulin	81124	Capulin Post Office
Carbondale	81623	Carbondale Post Office
Carr	80612	Carr Post Office
Cascade	80809	Cascade Post Office
Castle Pines	80108	Castle Rock Annex
Castle Rock	80104	Castle Rock Post Office
Castle Rock	80108	Castle Rock Annex
Castle Rock	80109	Castle Rock Annex
Cedaredge	81413	Cedaredge Post Office
Centennial	80015	Tower Station
Centennial	80016	Tower Station
Centennial	80111	Greenwood Village Post Office
Centennial	80112	Greenwood Village Post Office
Centennial	80121	Centennial Post Office
Centennial	80122	Centennial Post Office
Centennial	80161	Centennial Post Office
Center	81125	Center Post Office
Central City	80427	Central City Post Office
Chama	81126	Chama Post Office
Cheraw	81030	Cheraw Post Office
Cherry Hills Village	80110	Englewood Post Office
Cherry Hills Village	80111	Greenwood Village Post Office
Cherry Hills Village	80113	Englewood Post Office
Cherry Hills Village	80121	Centennial Post Office
Cheyenne Wells	80810	Cheyenne Wells Post Office
Chimney Rock	81122	Bayfield Post Office
Chimney Rock	81147	Pagosa Springs Post Office
Chipita Park	80809	Cascade Post Office
Chivington	81036	Eads Post Office
Chromo	81128	Pagosa Springs Post Office
Cimarron	81220	Cimarron Post Office
Clark	80428	Clark Post Office
Clifton	81520	Clifton Post Office
Climax	80429	Leadville Post Office
Coal Creek	81221	Coal Creek Post Office
Coaldale	81222	Coaldale Post Office
Coalmont	80430	Walden Post Office
Cokedale	81082	Trinidad Post Office
Collbran	81624	Collbran Post Office
Colorado City	81019	CPU Colorado City
Colorado Springs	80901	Colorado Springs Post Office
Colorado Springs	80902	Fort Carson Post Office
Colorado Springs	80903	Colorado Springs Post Office
Colorado Springs	80904	West End Annex
Colorado Springs	80905	Cheyenne Mountain Station
Colorado Springs	80906	Cheyenne Mountain Station
Colorado Springs	80907	North End Station
Colorado Springs	80908	Briargate Station
Colorado Springs	80909	Antares Station
Colorado Springs	80910	GMF Colorado Springs
Colorado Springs	80911	Security Station
Colorado Springs	80912	Colorado Springs Post Office
Colorado Springs	80913	Colorado Springs Post Office
Colorado Springs	80914	CPU Peterson AFB
Colorado Springs	80915	Cimarron Hills Station
Colorado Springs	80916	GMF Colorado Springs
Colorado Springs	80917	Templeton Station
Colorado Springs	80918	Templeton Station
Colorado Springs	80919	Rockrimmon Station
Colorado Springs	80920	Briargate Station
Colorado Springs	80921	Briargate Station
Colorado Springs	80922	Cimarron Hills Station
Colorado Springs	80923	Cimarron Hills Station
Colorado Springs	80924	Briargate Station
Colorado Springs	80925	Security Station
Colorado Springs	80926	Cheyenne Mountain Station
Colorado Springs	80927	Cimarron Hills Station
Colorado Springs	80928	Security Station
Colorado Springs	80929	Security Station
Colorado Springs	80930	Security Station
Colorado Springs	80931	Security Station
Colorado Springs	80932	Antares Station
Colorado Springs	80933	North End Station
Colorado Springs	80934	West End Station
Colorado Springs	80935	GMF Colorado Springs
Colorado Springs	80936	Templeton Station
Colorado Springs	80937	Cheyenne Mountain Station
Colorado Springs	80938	Cimarron Hills Station
Colorado Springs	80939	Cimarron Hills Station
Colorado Springs	80941	GMF Colorado Springs
Colorado Springs	80942	Colorado Springs Post Office
Colorado Springs	80946	Colorado Springs Post Office
Colorado Springs	80947	Colorado Springs Post Office
Colorado Springs	80949	Rockrimmon Station
Colorado Springs	80950	Antares Station
Colorado Springs	80951	Cimarron Hills Station
Colorado Springs	80960	Cheyenne Mountain Station
Colorado Springs	80962	Briargate Station
Colorado Springs	80970	Cimarron Hills Station
Colorado Springs	80977	Antares Station
Colorado Springs	80995	Colorado Springs Post Office
Colorado Springs	80997	Briargate Station
Columbine Valley	80123	Columbine Hills Station
Commerce City	80022	Adams City Station
Commerce City	80037	Commerce City Post Office
Commerce City	80216	Stockyards Station
Commerce City	80603	Brighton Post Office
Commerce City	80640	Henderson Post Office
Como	80432	Como Post Office
Conejos	81129	Conejos Post Office
Conifer	80433	Conifer Post Office
Cope	80812	Cope Post Office
Cortez	81321	Cortez Post Office
Cory	81414	Cory Post Office
Cotopaxi	81223	Cotopaxi Post Office
Cowdrey	80434	Cowdrey Post Office
Craig	81625	Craig Post Office
Craig	81626	Craig Post Office
Crawford	81415	Crawford Post Office
Creede	81130	Creede Post Office
Crested Butte	81224	Crested Butte Post Office
Crested Butte	81225	Crested Butte Distribution Post Office (Note: The Town of Mount Crested Butte, Colorado, is served by the Crested Butte Distribution Post Office (ZIP code 81225).)
Crestone	81131	Crestone Post Office
Cripple Creek	80813	Cripple Creek Post Office
Crook	80726	Crook Post Office
Crowley	81033	Crowley Post Office
Dacono	80514	Dacono Post Office
De Beque	81630	De Beque Post Office
Deckers	80135	Sedalia Post Office
Deer Trail	80105	Deer Trail Post Office
Del Norte	81132	Del Norte Post Office
Delhi	81059	Trinidad Post Office
Delta	81416	Delta Post Office
Denver	80012	Gateway Station
Denver	80014	Gateway Station
Denver	80022	Commerce City Post Office
Denver	80033	Wheat Ridge Post Office
Denver	80123	Columbine Hills Station
Denver	80127	Ken Caryl Ranch Station
Denver	80201	Denver Post Office
Denver	80202	Denver Post Office
Denver	80203	Capitol Hill Station
Denver	80204	Mile High Station
Denver	80205	Capitol Hill Annex
Denver	80206	Cherry Creek Station
Denver	80207	Park Hill Station
Denver	80208	University Park Station
Denver	80209	South Denver Station
Denver	80210	University Park Station
Denver	80211	Sunnyside Station
Denver	80212	Alcott Station (Note: The Town of Lakeside, Colorado, is served by the Denver Alcott Station (ZIP code 80212).) (Note: The Town of Mountain View, Colorado, is served by the Denver Alcott Station (ZIP code 80212).)
Denver	80214	Edgewater Post Office
Denver	80215	Lakewood Post Office
Denver	80216	Stockyards Station
Denver	80217	GMF Finance Station
Denver	80218	Capitol Hill Station
Denver	80219	Westwood Station
Denver	80220	Montclair Station
Denver	80221	North Pecos Station
Denver	80222	Wellshire Station
Denver	80223	South Denver Station
Denver	80224	Wellshire Station
Denver	80225	Denver Post Office
Denver	80226	Lakewood Post Office
Denver	80227	Bear Valley Station
Denver	80228	Lakewood Post Office
Denver	80229	North Pecos Station
Denver	80230	Montclair Station
Denver	80231	Sullivan Station
Denver	80232	Bear Valley Station
Denver	80233	Northglenn Post Office
Denver	80234	Northview Station
Denver	80235	Bear Valley Station
Denver	80236	Bear Valley Station
Denver	80237	Sullivan Station
Denver	80238	Montbello Station
Denver	80239	Montbello Station
Denver	80241	Northglenn Post Office
Denver	80243	GMF Finance Center
Denver	80246	Glendale Post Office
Denver	80247	Sullivan Station
Denver	80248	Denver Post Office
Denver	80249	Montbello Station
Denver	80250	University Park Station
Denver	80256	GMF Finance Center
Denver	80257	Denver Post Office
Denver	80259	Denver Post Office
Denver	80260	North Pecos Station
Denver	80261	GMF Finance Center
Denver	80263	GMF Finance Center
Denver	80264	Capitol Hill Annex
Denver	80265	Denver Post Office
Denver	80266	Denver Post Office
Denver	80271	GMF Finance Center
Denver	80273	Capitol Hill Annex
Denver	80274	GMF Finance Center
Denver	80281	GMF Finance Center
Denver	80290	Denver Post Office
Denver	80291	GMF Finance Center
Denver	80293	Denver Post Office
Denver	80294	Denver Post Office
Denver	80299	Denver Post Office
Deora	81054	Las Animas Post Office
Dillon	80435	Dillon Post Office
Dinosaur	81610	Dinosaur Post Office
Dinosaur	81633	Dinosaur Post Office
Divide	80814	Divide Post Office
Dolores	81323	Dolores Post Office
Dove Creek	81324	Dove Creek Post Office
Drake	80515	Drake Post Office
Dumont	80436	Dumont Post Office
Dupont	80024	Dupont Post Office
Durango	81301	Durango Post Office
Durango	81302	Durango Post Office
Durango	81303	Durango Post Office
Eads	81036	Eads Post Office
Eagle	81631	Eagle Post Office
Eastlake	80614	Eastlake Post Office
Eaton	80615	Eaton Post Office
Eckert	81418	Eckert Post Office
Eckley	80727	Eckley Post Office
Edgewater	80214	Edgewater Post Office
Edwards	81632	Edwards Post Office
Egnar	81325	Egnar Post Office
El Jebel	81623	Carbondale Post Office
Elbert	80106	Elbert Post Office
Eldorado Springs	80025	Eldorado Springs Post Office
Elizabeth	80107	Elizabeth Post Office
Elk Springs	81633	Dinosaur Post Office
Empire	80438	Empire Post Office
Englewood	80110	Englewood Post Office
Englewood	80111	Greenwood Village Post Office
Englewood	80112	Greenwood Village Post Office
Englewood	80113	Englewood Post Office
Englewood	80150	Englewood Post Office
Englewood	80151	Downtown Englewood Post Office
Englewood	80155	Greenwood Village Post Office
Erie	80026	Lafayette Annex
Erie	80514	Dacono Post Office
Erie	80516	Erie Post Office
Estes Park	80511	CPU YMCA Camp of the Rockies
Estes Park	80517	Estes Park Post Office
Evans	80620	Evans Post Office
Evans	80634	Greeley Post Office
Evans	80645	Evans Post Office
Evergreen	80401	Golden Sorting and Distribution Center
Evergreen	80437	Evergreen Post Office
Evergreen	80439	Evergreen Post Office
Fairplay	80432	Como Post Office
Fairplay	80440	Fairplay Post Office
Fairplay	80456	Fairplay Post Office
Falcon	80831	Peyton Post Office
Farisita	81089	Walsenburg Post Office
Federal Heights	80221	North Pecos Station
Federal Heights	80234	Northview Station
Federal Heights	80260	North Pecos Station
Firestone	80520	Firestone Post Office
Flagler	80815	Flagler Post Office
Fleming	80728	Fleming Post Office
Florence	81226	Florence Post Office (Note: The Town of Williamsburg, Colorado, is served by the Florence Post Office (ZIP code 81226).)
Florence	81290	Florence Post Office
Florissant	80816	Florissant Post Office
Fort Carson	80902	Fort Carson Post Office
Fort Carson	80912	Colorado Springs Post Office
Fort Collins	80521	Old Town Station
Fort Collins	80522	Old Town Station
Fort Collins	80523	Old Town Station
Fort Collins	80524	Old Town Station
Fort Collins	80525	Fort Collins Post Office
Fort Collins	80526	Fort Collins Post Office
Fort Collins	80527	Fort Collins Post Office
Fort Collins	80528	Fort Collins Post Office
Fort Collins	80553	Fort Collins Post Office
Fort Garland	81133	Fort Garland Post Office
Fort Lupton	80621	Fort Lupton Post Office
Fort Lyon	81038	Las Animas Post Office
Fort Lyon	81054	Las Animas Post Office
Fort Morgan	80701	Fort Morgan Post Office
Fort Morgan	80705	Fort Morgan Post Office
Fountain	80817	Fountain Post Office
Fowler	81039	Fowler Post Office
Foxfield	80016	Tower Station
Foxton	80433	Conifer Post Office
Franktown	80116	Franktown Post Office
Fraser	80442	Fraser Post Office
Frederick	80504	Longmont Post Office
Frederick	80516	Erie Annex
Frederick	80530	Frederick Post Office
Frisco	80443	Frisco Post Office
Fruita	81521	Fruita Post Office
Fruitvale	81504	Grand Junction Annex
Galeton	80622	Galeton Post Office
Garcia	81152	San Luis Post Office
Garden City	80631	Downtown Greeley Post Office
Gardner	81040	Gardner Post Office
Gateway	81522	Gateway Post Office
Genoa	80818	Genoa Post Office
Georgetown	80444	Georgetown Post Office
Gilcrest	80623	Gilcrest Post Office
Gill	80624	Gill Post Office
Gilman	81645	Minturn Post Office
Glade Park	81523	Grand Junction Post Office
Glen Haven	80532	Glen Haven Post Office
Glendale	80246	Glendale Post Office
Glenwood Springs	81601	Glenwood Springs Post Office (Note: The Town of Carbonate, Colorado, lies in the service area of the Glenwood Springs Post Office (ZIP code 81601), although no service is currently available.)
Glenwood Springs	81602	Glenwood Springs Post Office
Golden	80401	Golden Sorting and Distribution Center
Golden	80402	Downtown Golden Post Office
Golden	80403	Golden Sorting and Distribution Center
Golden	80419	Downtown Golden Post Office
Golden	80439	Evergreen Post Office
Granada	81041	Granada Post Office
Granby	80446	Granby Post Office
Grand Junction	81501	Grand Junction Post Office
Grand Junction	81502	Grand Junction Post Office
Grand Junction	81503	Grand Junction Post Office
Grand Junction	81504	Fruitvale Post Office
Grand Junction	81505	Grand Junction Annex
Grand Junction	81506	Grand Junction Annex
Grand Junction	81507	Grand Junction Annex
Grand Lake	80447	Grand Lake Post Office
Granite	81228	Buena Vista Post Office
Grant	80448	Shawnee Post Office
Greeley	80631	Downtown Greeley Post Office
Greeley	80632	Downtown Greeley Post Office
Greeley	80633	Greeley Post Office
Greeley	80634	Greeley Post Office
Greeley	80638	Greeley Post Office
Greeley	80639	Downtown Greeley Post Office
Green Mountain Falls	80819	Green Mountain Falls Post Office
Greenwood Village	80110	Englewood Post Office
Greenwood Village	80111	Greenwood Village Post Office
Greenwood Village	80112	Greenwood Village Post Office
Greenwood Village	80121	Centennial Post Office
Greenwood Village	80155	Greenwood Village Post Office
Grover	80729	Grover Post Office
Guffey	80820	Guffey Post Office
Gunnison	81230	Gunnison Post Office
Gunnison	81231	Gunnison Post Office
Gypsum	81637	Gypsum Post Office
Hale	80735	Idalia Post Office
Hamilton	81638	Hamilton Post Office
Hartman	81043	Hartman Post Office
Hartsel	80449	Hartsel Post Office
Hasty	81044	Hasty Post Office
Haswell	81045	Haswell Post Office
Haxtun	80731	Haxtun Post Office
Hayden	81639	Hayden Post Office
Heeney	80498	Silverthorne Post Office
Henderson	80640	Henderson Post Office
Hereford	80732	Hereford Post Office
Hesperus	81326	Hesperus Post Office
Highlands Ranch	80126	Highlands Ranch Post Office
Highlands Ranch	80129	Highlands Ranch Post Office
Highlands Ranch	80130	Highlands Ranch Post Office
Highlands Ranch	80163	Highlands Ranch Post Office
Hillrose	80733	Hillrose Post Office
Hillside	81232	Salida Post Office
Hoehne	81046	Hoehne Post Office
Holly	81047	Holly Post Office
Holyoke	80734	Holyoke Post Office
Homelake	81135	Monte Vista Post Office
Hooper	81136	Hooper Post Office
Hot Sulphur Springs	80451	Hot Sulphur Springs Post Office
Hotchkiss	81419	Hotchkiss Post Office
Howard	81233	Howard Post Office
Hoyt	80654	Wiggins Post Office
Hudson	80642	Hudson Post Office
Hugo	80821	Hugo Post Office
Hygiene	80533	Hygiene Post Office
Idaho Springs	80452	Idaho Springs Post Office
Idalia	80735	Idalia Post Office
Idledale	80453	Idledale Post Office
Ignacio	81137	Ignacio Post Office
Iliff	80736	Iliff Post Office
Indian Hills	80454	Indian Hills Post Office
Jamestown	80455	Jamestown Post Office
Jansen	81082	Trinidad Post Office
Jaroso	81138	Jaroso Post Office
Jefferson	80456	Fairplay Post Office
Joes	80822	Joes Post Office
Johnstown	80534	Johnstown Post Office
Julesburg	80737	Julesburg Post Office
Karval	80823	Karval Post Office
Keenesburg	80643	Keenesburg Post Office
Kersey	80644	Kersey Post Office
Keystone	80435	Dillon Post Office
Kim	81049	Kim Post Office
Kiowa	80117	Kiowa Post Office
Kirk	80824	Kirk Post Office
Kit Carson	80825	Kit Carson Post Office
Kittredge	80457	Kittredge Post Office
Kremmling	80459	Kremmling Post Office
La Jara	81140	La Jara Post Office
La Junta	81050	La Junta Post Office
La Veta	81055	La Veta Post Office
Lafayette	80026	Lafayette Post Office
Laird	80758	Wray Post Office
Lake City	81235	Lake City Post Office
Lake George	80827	Lake George Post Office
Lakewood	80123	Columbine Hills Station
Lakewood	80214	Edgewater Post Office
Lakewood	80215	Lakewood Post Office
Lakewood	80225	Denver Post Office
Lakewood	80226	Lakewood Post Office
Lakewood	80227	Bear Valley Station
Lakewood	80228	Lakewood Post Office
Lakewood	80232	Bear Valley Station
Lakewood	80235	Bear Valley Station
Lakewood	80236	Bear Valley Station
Lakewood	80401	Golden Sorting and Distribution Center
Lamar	81052	Lamar Post Office
Laporte	80535	Laporte Post Office
Larkspur	80118	Larkspur Post Office
Las Animas	81054	Las Animas Post Office
LaSalle (Note: The Town of LaSalle, Colorado, prefers to spell its name as a single word. The United States Postal Service prefers two words.)	80645	La Salle Post Office
Lazear	81420	Lazear Post Office
Leadville	80429	Leadville Post Office
Leadville	80461	Leadville Post Office
Lewis	81327	Lewis Post Office
Limon	80826	Limon Post Office
Limon	80828	Limon Post Office
Lindon	80740	Lindon Post Office
Littleton	80120	Littleton Post Office
Littleton	80121	Centennial Post Office
Littleton	80122	Centennial Post Office
Littleton	80123	Columbine Hills Station
Littleton	80124	Highlands Ranch Post Office
Littleton	80125	Ken Caryl Ranch Station
Littleton	80126	Highlands Ranch Post Office
Littleton	80127	Ken Caryl Ranch Station
Littleton	80128	Ken Caryl Ranch Station
Littleton	80129	Highlands Ranch Post Office
Littleton	80130	Highlands Ranch Post Office
Littleton	80160	Littleton Post Office
Littleton	80161	Centennial Post Office
Littleton	80162	Columbine Hills Station
Littleton	80163	Highlands Ranch Post Office
Littleton	80165	Littleton Post Office
Littleton	80166	Littleton Post Office
Livermore	80536	Livermore Post Office
Lochbuie	80603	Brighton Post Office
Log Lane Village	80705	Fort Morgan Post Office
Loma	81524	Loma Post Office
Lone Tree	80112	Greenwood Village Post Office
Lone Tree	80124	Highlands Ranch Post Office
Lone Tree	80134	Parker Post Office
Longmont	80501	Longmont Post Office
Longmont	80502	Longmont Post Office
Longmont	80503	Longmont Post Office
Longmont	80504	Longmont Post Office
Louisville	80027	Louisville Post Office
Louviers	80131	Louviers Post Office
Loveland	80534	Johnstown Post Office
Loveland	80537	Loveland Post Office
Loveland	80538	Loveland Post Office
Loveland	80539	Loveland Post Office
Lucerne	80646	Lucerne Post Office
Lycan	81084	Two Buttes Post Office
Lyons	80540	Lyons Post Office
Mack	81525	Mack Post Office
Maher	81415	Crawford Post Office
Manassa	81141	Manassa Post Office
Mancos	81328	Mancos Post Office
Manitou Springs	80829	Manitou Springs Post Office
Manzanola	81058	Manzanola Post Office
Marble	81623	Carbondale Post Office
Marvel	81329	Marvel Post Office
Masonville	80541	Masonville Post Office
Matheson	80830	Matheson Post Office
Maybell	81640	Maybell Post Office
McClave	81057	McClave Post Office
McCoy	80463	McCoy Post Office
Mead	80542	Mead Post Office
Meeker	81641	Meeker Post Office
Meredith	81642	Meredith Post Office
Merino	80741	Merino Post Office
Mesa	81643	Mesa Post Office
Mesa Verde National Park	81330	Mesa Verde Post Office
Mesita	81152	San Luis Post Office
Milliken	80543	Milliken Post Office
Minturn	81645	Minturn Post Office
Model	81059	Trinidad Post Office
Moffat	81143	Moffat Post Office
Molina	81646	Molina Post Office
Monarch	81227	Salida Post Office
Monte Vista	81135	Monte Vista Post Office
Monte Vista	81144	Monte Vista Post Office
Montezuma	80435	Dillon Post Office
Montrose	81401	Montrose Annex
Montrose	81402	Montrose Post Office
Montrose	81403	Montrose Annex
Monument	80132	Monument Post Office
Morrison	80465	Morrison Post Office
Mosca	81146	Mosca Post Office
Mountain Village	81435	Telluride Post Office
Nathrop	81236	Nathrop Post Office
Naturita	81422	Naturita Post Office
Nederland	80466	Nederland Post Office
New Castle	81647	New Castle Post Office
New Raymer (Note: The Raymer, Colorado, post office operated from June 27, 1888, until May 14, 1895. On November 13, 1909, the New Raymer, Colorado, post office opened near the train station, about 640 feet (200 m) southwest of the original post office. The Town of Raymer, the State of Colorado, and the United States Census Bureau prefer the original name.)	80742	New Raymer Post Office
Ninaview	81054	Las Animas Post Office
Niwot	80503	Longmont Post Office
Niwot	80504	Longmont Post Office
Niwot	80544	Niwot Post Office
Northglenn	80233	Northglenn Post Office
Northglenn	80234	Northview Station
Northglenn	80241	Northglenn Post Office
Northglenn	80260	North Pecos Station
Norwood	81423	Norwood Post Office
Nucla	81424	Nucla Post Office
Nunn	80648	Nunn Post Office
Oak Creek	80467	Oak Creek Post Office
Ohio City	81237	Parlin Post Office
Olathe	81425	Olathe Post Office
Olney Springs	81062	Olney Springs Post Office
Ophir	81426	Ophir Post Office
Orchard	80649	Orchard Post Office
Orchard City	81410	Austin Post Office
Orchard City	81414	Cory Post Office
Orchard City	81418	Eckert Post Office
Ordway	81034	Ordway Post Office
Ordway	81063	Ordway Post Office
Otis	80743	Otis Post Office
Ouray	81427	Ouray Post Office
Ovid	80744	Ovid Post Office
Padroni	80745	Peetz Post Office
Pagosa Springs	81147	Pagosa Springs Post Office
Pagosa Springs	81157	Pagosa Springs Post Office
Palisade	81526	Palisade Post Office
Palmer Lake	80133	Palmer Lake Post Office
Paoli	80746	Haxtun Post Office
Paonia	81428	Paonia Post Office
Parachute	81635	Parachute Post Office
Parachute	81636	Parachute Post Office
Paradox	81429	Paradox Post Office
Parker	80134	Parker Post Office
Parker	80138	Parker Post Office
Parlin	81239	Parlin Post Office
Parshall	80468	Parshall Post Office
Peetz	80747	Peetz Post Office
Penrose	81240	Penrose Post Office
Peyton	80831	Peyton Post Office
Phippsburg	80469	Oak Creek Post Office
Pierce	80650	Pierce Post Office
Pine	80470	Pine Post Office
Pinecliffe	80471	Pinecliffe Post Office
Piñon	81008	Pueblo Post Office
Pitkin	81241	Pitkin Post Office
Placerville	81430	Placerville Post Office
Platteville	80651	Platteville Post Office
Pleasant View	81331	Pleasant View Post Office
Poncha Springs	81242	Poncha Springs Post Office
Powderhorn	81243	Gunnison Post Office
Pritchett	81064	Pritchett Post Office
Pueblo	81001	Belmont Station
Pueblo	81002	Midtown Station
Pueblo	81003	Pueblo Post Office
Pueblo	81004	Sunset Station
Pueblo	81005	Sunset Station
Pueblo	81006	Sunset Station
Pueblo	81007	Pueblo Post Office
Pueblo	81008	Pueblo Post Office
Pueblo	81009	Pueblo Post Office
Pueblo	81010	Pueblo Post Office
Pueblo	81011	Pueblo Post Office
Pueblo	81012	Pueblo Post Office
Pueblo West	81007	CPU Pueblo West
Ramah	80832	Ramah Post Office
Rand	80473	Rand Post Office
Rangely	81648	Rangely Post Office
Raymer	80742	New Raymer Post Office
Red Cliff	81649	Red Cliff Post Office
Red Feather Lakes	80545	Red Feather Lakes Post Office
Redstone	81623	Carbondale Post Office
Redvale	81431	Redvale Post Office
Rico	81332	Rico Post Office
Ridgway	81432	Ridgway Post Office
Rifle	81650	Rifle Post Office
Rockvale	81244	Rockvale Post Office
Rocky Ford	81067	Rocky Ford Post Office
Roggen	80652	Roggen Post Office
Rollinsville	80474	Rollinsville Post Office
Romeo	81148	Romeo Post Office
Roxborough	80125	Ken Caryl Ranch Station
Rush	80833	Rush Post Office
Rye	81069	Rye Post Office
Saguache	81149	Saguache Post Office
Salida	81201	Salida Post Office
Salida	81227	Salida Post Office
San Acacio	81151	Sanford Post Office
San Luis	81152	San Luis Post Office
San Pablo	81152	San Luis Post Office
Sanford	81151	Sanford Post Office
Sargents	81248	Sargents Post Office
Sawpit	81430	Placerville Post Office
Sawpit	81435	Telluride Post Office
Sedalia	80135	Sedalia Post Office
Sedgwick	80749	Sedgwick Post Office
Seibert	80834	Seibert Post Office
Severance	80546	Severance Post Office
Shawnee	80475	Shawnee Post Office
Sheridan	80110	Englewood Post Office
Sheridan Lake	81071	Sheridan Lake Post Office
Silt	81652	Silt Post Office
Silver Cliff	81653	Slater Post Office
Silver Plume	80476	Silver Plume Post Office
Silverthorne	80497	Silverthorne Post Office
Silverthorne	80498	Silverthorne Post Office
Silverton	81433	Silverton Post Office
Simla	80835	Simla Post Office
Slater	81653	Slater Post Office
Slick Rock	81325	Egnar Post Office
Snowmass	81654	Snowmass Post Office
Snowmass Village	81615	Snowmass Village Post Office
Snyder	80750	Snyder Post Office
Somerset	81434	Somerset Post Office
Sopris	81082	Trinidad Post Office
South Fork	81154	South Fork Post Office
Springfield	81073	Springfield Post Office
Starkville	81082	Trinidad Post Office
Steamboat Springs	80477	Steamboat Springs Post Office
Steamboat Springs	80487	Steamboat Springs Post Office
Steamboat Springs	80488	Steamboat Springs Post Office
Sterling	80751	Sterling Post Office
Stoneham	80754	Stoneham Post Office
Stonington	81090	Walsh Post Office
Strasburg	80136	Strasburg Post Office
Stratton	80836	Stratton Post Office
Sugar City	81076	Sugar City Post Office
Superior	80027	Louisville Post Office
Swink	81077	Swink Post Office
Tabernash	80478	Tabernash Post Office
Telluride	81435	Telluride Post Office
Thatcher	81059	Trinidad Post Office
Thornton	80023	Broomfield Post Office
Thornton	80221	North Pecos Station
Thornton	80229	Thornton Annex
Thornton	80233	Northglenn Post Office
Thornton	80241	Northglenn Post Office
Thornton	80260	North Pecos Station
Thornton	80602	Brighton Annex
Timnath	80547	Timnath Post Office
Timpas	81050	La Junta Post Office
Toponas	80479	Toponas Post Office
Towaoc	81334	Towaoc Post Office
Towner	81071	Sheridan Lake Post Office
Trinchera	81081	Branson Post Office
Trinidad	81082	Trinidad Post Office
Twin Lakes	81228	Buena Vista Post Office
Twin Lakes	81251	Buena Vista Post Office
Two Buttes	81084	Two Buttes Post Office
Tyrone	81059	Trinidad Post Office
USAF Academy	80840	Air Academy Station
USAF Academy	80841	Cadet Station
Utleyville	81064	Pritchett Post Office
Vail	81657	Vail Post Office
Vail	81658	Vail Post Office
Vernon	80755	Vernon Post Office
Victor	80860	Victor Post Office
Vilas	81087	Vilas Post Office
Villa Grove	81155	Villa Grove Post Office (Note: The Town of Bonanza, Colorado, is served by the Villa Grove Post Office (ZIP code 81155).)
Villegreen	81049	Kim Post Office
Vona	80861	Vona Post Office
Walden	80430	Walden Post Office
Walden	80480	Walden Post Office
Walsenburg	81089	Walsenburg Post Office
Walsh	81090	Walsh Post Office
Ward	80481	Ward Post Office
Watkins	80137	Watkins Post Office
Weldona	80653	Weldona Post Office
Wellington	80549	Wellington Post Office
Westcliffe	81252	Westcliffe Post Office
Westminster	80003	Indian Tree Station
Westminster	80005	Indian Tree Station
Westminster	80020	Broomfield Post Office
Westminster	80021	Eagle View Station
Westminster	80023	Broomfield Post Office
Westminster	80030	Westminster Post Office
Westminster	80031	Westminster Post Office
Westminster	80035	Westminster Post Office
Westminster	80036	Harris Park Station
Westminster	80221	North Pecos Station
Westminster	80234	Northview Station
Westminster	80241	Northglenn Post Office
Westminster	80260	North Pecos Station
Weston	81091	Trinidad Post Office
Wetmore	81253	Wetmore Post Office
Wheat Ridge	80033	Wheat Ridge Post Office
Wheat Ridge	80034	Wheat Ridge Post Office
Wheat Ridge	80212	Alcott Station
Wheat Ridge	80214	Edgewater Post Office
Wheat Ridge	80215	Lakewood Post Office
Whitewater	81527	Whitewater Post Office
Wiggins	80654	Wiggins Post Office
Wild Horse	80862	Wild Horse Post Office
Wiley	81092	Wiley Post Office
Windsor	80550	Windsor Post Office
Windsor	80551	Windsor Post Office
Winter Park	80482	Winter Park Post Office
Wolcott	81655	Wolcott Post Office
Woodland Park	80863	Woodland Park Post Office
Woodland Park	80866	Woodland Park Post Office
Woodrow	80757	Woodrow Post Office
Woody Creek	81656	Woody Creek Post Office
Wray	80758	Wray Post Office
Yampa	80483	Yampa Post Office
Yellow Jacket	81335	Yellow Jacket Post Office
Yoder	80864	Yoder Post Office
Yuma	80759	Yuma Post Office

== See also ==
- Bibliography of Colorado
- Geography of Colorado
- History of Colorado
- Index of Colorado-related articles
- List of Colorado-related lists
  - List of post offices in Colorado
- Outline of Colorado
  - United States Postal Service
