= Las Animas County, Colorado =

County in Colorado, United States

- County
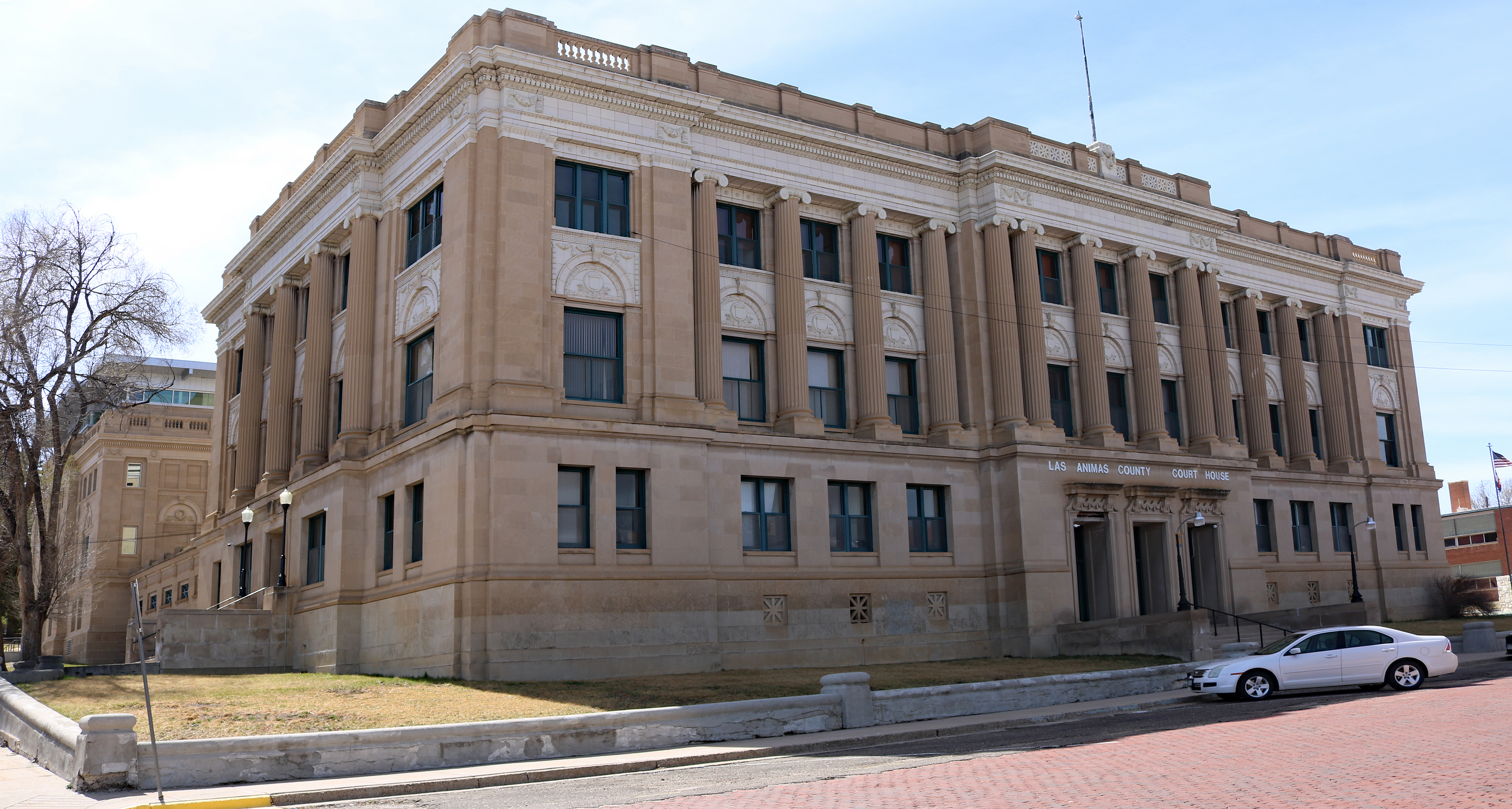
- Las Animas County Courthouse in Trinidad

- Location within the U.S. state of Colorado
- Coordinates: 37.32°N 104.04°W
- Country: United States
- State: Colorado
- Founded: February 9, 1866
- Named for: Purgatoire River
- Seat: Trinidad

Area
  - Total: 4,775 sq mi (12,370 km^{2})
  - Land: 4,773 sq mi (12,360 km^{2})
  - Water: 2.7 sq mi (7.0 km^{2}) 0.06%

Population (2020)
  - Total: 14,555
  - Estimate (2025): 14,391 ▼
  - Density: 3.049/sq mi (1.177/km^{2})
- Time zone: UTC−7 (Mountain)
  - Summer (DST): UTC−6 (MDT)
- Area code: 719
- Website: lasanimascounty.colorado.gov

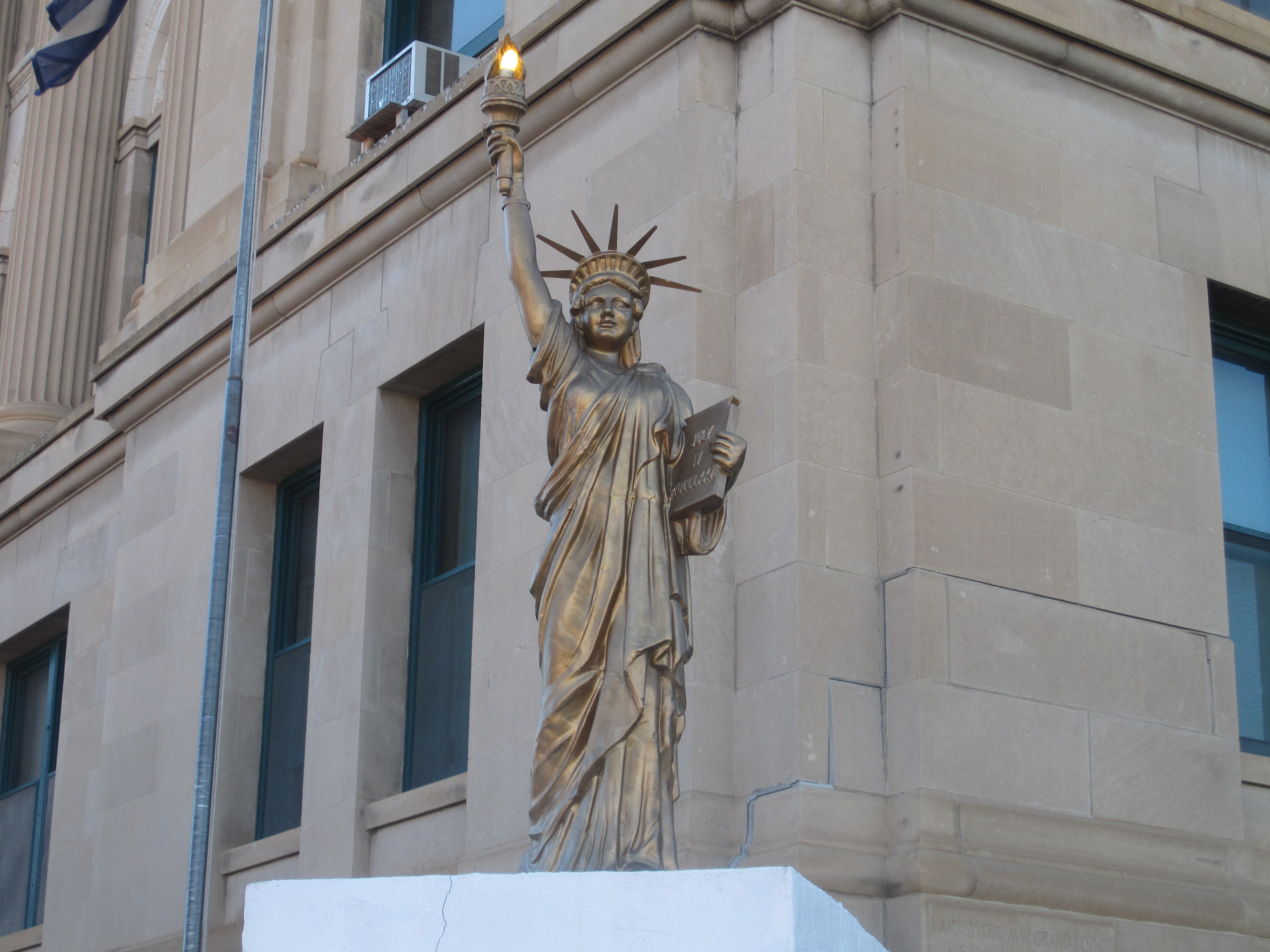
Statue of Liberty replica at the Las Animas Courthouse in Trinidad

Las Animas County is a county located in the U.S. state of Colorado. As of the 2020 census, the population was 14,555. The county seat is Trinidad. The county takes its name from the Mexican Spanish name of the Purgatoire River, originally called El Río de las Ánimas Perdidas en el Purgatorio, which means "River of the Lost Souls in Purgatory."

== Geography ==
According to the U.S. Census Bureau, the county has a total area of 4,775 square miles (12,370 km^{2}), of which 4,773 square miles (12,360 km^{2}) is land and 2.7 square miles (7.0 km^{2}) (0.06%) is water. It is the largest county by area in Colorado.

=== Adjacent counties ===
- Otero County - north
- Pueblo County - north
- Bent County - northeast
- Baca County - east
- Union County, New Mexico - south
- Colfax County, New Mexico - southwest
- Costilla County- west
- Huerfano County - northwest

=== Major highways ===
- I-25 / US 85 / US 87
  - I-25 BL (Trinidad)
  - I-25 BS (Aguilar)
- US 160
- US 350
- SH 12
- SH 109
- SH 389

=== Protected areas ===
- Comanche National Grassland
- Lake Dorothey State Wildlife Area
- James M. John State Wildlife Area
- San Isabel National Forest
- Spanish Peaks Wilderness
- Fishers Peak State Park
- Trinidad Lake State Park

=== Historic trails and landmarks ===
- Mesa de Maya
- Raton Pass National Historic Landmark
- Santa Fe National Historic Trail
- Trinidad State History Museum

The county features the Painted Canyon along the Purgatoire River, where folk artist Martin Bowden spent decades painting life-sized figures on the sandstone walls.

=== Scenic byways ===
- Highway of Legends Scenic Byway
- Santa Fe Trail National Scenic Byway

== Demographics ==
Historical population
Census	Pop.	Note	%±
1870	4,276		—
1880	8,903		108.2%
1890	17,208		93.3%
1900	21,842		26.9%
1910	33,643		54.0%
1920	38,975		15.8%
1930	36,008		−7.6%
1940	32,369		−10.1%
1950	25,902		−20.0%
1960	19,983		−22.9%
1970	15,744		−21.2%
1980	14,897		−5.4%
1990	13,765		−7.6%
2000	15,207		10.5%
2010	15,507		2.0%
2020	14,555		−6.1%
2025 (est.)	14,391	▼	−1.1%
U.S. Decennial Census; 1790-1960 1900-1990; 1990-2000 2010-2020

=== 2020 census ===
As of the 2020 census, the county had a population of 14,555. Of the residents, 17.3% were under the age of 18 and 25.7% were 65 years of age or older; the median age was 48.4 years. For every 100 females there were 109.2 males, and for every 100 females age 18 and over there were 110.2 males. 57.2% of residents lived in urban areas and 42.8% lived in rural areas.

Las Animas County, Colorado – Racial and ethnic composition Note: the US Census treats Hispanic/Latino as an ethnic category. This table excludes Latinos from the racial categories and assigns them to a separate category. Hispanics/Latinos may be of any race.
Race / Ethnicity (NH = Non-Hispanic)	Pop 2000	Pop 2010	Pop 2020	% 2000	% 2010	% 2020
White alone (NH)	8,387	8,399	7,965	55.15%	54.16%	54.72%
Black or African American alone (NH)	52	195	183	0.34%	1.26%	1.26%
Native American or Alaska Native alone (NH)	161	170	145	1.06%	1.10%	1.00%
Asian alone (NH)	53	98	108	0.35%	0.63%	0.74%
Pacific Islander alone (NH)	13	4	12	0.09%	0.03%	0.08%
Other race alone (NH)	16	12	87	0.11%	0.08%	0.60%
Mixed race or Multiracial (NH)	221	183	423	1.45%	1.18%	2.91%
Hispanic or Latino (any race)	6,304	6,446	5,632	41.45%	41.57%	38.69%
Total	15,207	15,507	14,555	100.00%	100.00%	100.00%

The racial makeup of the county was 68.9% White, 1.4% Black or African American, 2.5% American Indian and Alaska Native, 0.8% Asian, 0.1% Native Hawaiian and Pacific Islander, 11.0% from some other race, and 15.1% from two or more races. Hispanic or Latino residents of any race comprised 38.7% of the population.

There were 6,373 households in the county, of which 22.0% had children under the age of 18 living with them and 27.1% had a female householder with no spouse or partner present. About 35.6% of all households were made up of individuals and 18.1% had someone living alone who was 65 years of age or older.

There were 8,077 housing units, of which 21.1% were vacant. Among occupied housing units, 69.7% were owner-occupied and 30.3% were renter-occupied. The homeowner vacancy rate was 2.9% and the rental vacancy rate was 12.2%.

=== 2000 census ===
At the 2000 census there were 15,207 people, 6,173 households, and 4,092 families living in the county. The population density was 3 people per square mile (1.2 people/km^{2}). There were 7,629 housing units at an average density of 2 units per square mile (0.77 units/km^{2}). The racial makeup of the county was 82.63% White, 0.39% Black or African American, 2.54% Native American, 0.37% Asian, 0.20% Pacific Islander, 10.03% from other races, and 3.83% from two or more races. 41.45% of the population were Hispanic or Latino of any race. Of the 6,173 households 28.80% had children under the age of 18 living with them, 49.90% were married couples living together, 11.60% had a female householder with no husband present, and 33.70% were non-families. 29.70% of households were one person and 14.30% were one person aged 65 or older. The average household size was 2.40 and the average family size was 2.97.

The age distribution was 24.20% under the age of 18, 7.90% from 18 to 24, 24.00% from 25 to 44, 25.90% from 45 to 64, and 18.00% 65 or older. The median age was 41 years. For every 100 females there were 95.80 males. For every 100 females age 18 and over, there were 93.70 males.

The median household income was $28,273 and the median family income was $34,072. Males had a median income of $27,182 versus $20,891 for females. The per capita income for the county was $16,829. About 14.00% of families and 17.30% of the population were below the poverty line, including 20.00% of those under age 18 and 17.20% of those age 65 or over.

== Politics ==
A Democratic stronghold since the days of Franklin Roosevelt after having been solidly Republican during the "system of 1896" like the rest of Hispanic Colorado, Las Animas County has seen a strong trend toward the Republican Party in recent elections. Hillary Clinton's 2016 performance was the worst by a Democrat since John W. Davis in 1924. She was also the first Democrat to lose the county since George McGovern in 1972. In 2020, Joe Biden became the first Democrat to win the presidency without the county since Woodrow Wilson in 1912.

Las Animas County was the only county in Colorado to vote for legal abortion but against legal same-sex marriage in 2024, although anti-LGBT sentiment was also noticeably higher than anti-abortion sentiment in neighboring Bent County as well as in Jackson County on the opposite side of the state, both of which opposed both but only opposed same-sex marriage by a landslide margin. In Colorado overall, the pro-LGBT Amendment J did slightly better than the pro-choice Amendment 79.

United States presidential election results for Las Animas County, Colorado
Year	Republican		Democratic		Third party(ies)	
Year	No.	%	No.	%	No.	%
1880	586	30.14%	1,314	67.59%	44	2.26%
1884	1,039	41.73%	1,451	58.27%	0	0.00%
1888	2,655	46.85%	2,785	49.14%	227	4.01%
1892	1,276	41.31%	0	0.00%	1,813	58.69%
1896	1,126	16.90%	5,497	82.50%	40	0.60%
1900	3,382	44.16%	4,204	54.90%	72	0.94%
1904	5,218	52.97%	4,486	45.54%	146	1.48%
1908	5,716	56.39%	4,212	41.55%	209	2.06%
1912	4,318	43.82%	3,604	36.57%	1,932	19.61%
1916	3,511	38.81%	5,300	58.58%	236	2.61%
1920	4,707	51.19%	4,167	45.31%	322	3.50%
1924	5,698	48.68%	2,758	23.56%	3,250	27.76%
1928	5,367	44.74%	6,459	53.85%	169	1.41%
1932	3,651	28.35%	8,964	69.61%	262	2.03%
1936	3,333	24.49%	10,220	75.08%	59	0.43%
1940	4,859	35.53%	8,766	64.10%	50	0.37%
1944	4,179	37.87%	6,800	61.63%	55	0.50%
1948	3,452	30.79%	7,586	67.67%	172	1.53%
1952	4,467	40.74%	6,446	58.79%	51	0.47%
1956	5,290	50.80%	5,099	48.96%	25	0.24%
1960	2,989	30.74%	6,704	68.96%	29	0.30%
1964	1,833	21.68%	6,591	77.97%	29	0.34%
1968	2,499	33.30%	4,602	61.33%	403	5.37%
1972	3,659	52.59%	3,222	46.31%	76	1.09%
1976	2,615	36.45%	4,459	62.15%	101	1.41%
1980	2,917	39.37%	4,117	55.57%	375	5.06%
1984	2,992	44.38%	3,670	54.43%	80	1.19%
1988	2,162	34.15%	4,075	64.37%	94	1.48%
1992	1,739	26.47%	3,847	58.56%	983	14.96%
1996	1,905	31.53%	3,611	59.76%	526	8.71%
2000	2,569	42.16%	3,243	53.22%	282	4.63%
2004	3,196	48.48%	3,300	50.06%	96	1.46%
2008	3,086	45.64%	3,562	52.68%	113	1.67%
2012	3,263	47.55%	3,445	50.20%	154	2.24%
2016	3,710	54.62%	2,650	39.01%	433	6.37%
2020	4,284	53.81%	3,497	43.93%	180	2.26%
2024	4,328	55.54%	3,276	42.04%	189	2.43%

United States Senate election results for Las Animas County, Colorado2
Year	Republican		Democratic		Third party(ies)	
Year	No.	%	No.	%	No.	%
2020	4,217	53.21%	3,509	44.28%	199	2.51%

United States Senate election results for Las Animas County, Colorado3
Year	Republican		Democratic		Third party(ies)	
Year	No.	%	No.	%	No.	%
2022	3,166	47.44%	3,291	49.32%	216	3.24%

Colorado Gubernatorial election results for Las Animas County
Year	Republican		Democratic		Third party(ies)	
Year	No.	%	No.	%	No.	%
2022	3,071	45.90%	3,411	50.98%	209	3.12%

== Communities ==
=== City ===
- Trinidad

=== Towns ===
- Aguilar
- Branson
- Cokedale
- Kim
- Starkville

=== Unincorporated communities ===
- Boncarbo
- Earl
- Model
- Thatcher
- Trinchera
- Tyrone
- Villegreen

=== Former towns ===
- Brodhead
- Delagua
- Delhi
- Ludlow
- Madrid
- Morley
- Sopris
- Tercio

=== Census-designated places ===
- El Moro
- Hoehne
- Jansen
- Lynn
- Segundo
- Stonewall Gap
- Valdez
- Weston

"The county is also home to the Painted Canyon, where outsider artist Martin Bowden spent 40 years carving and painting murals along the walls of the Purgatoire Canyon."

== Gallery ==
Area affected by 1930s Dust Bowl

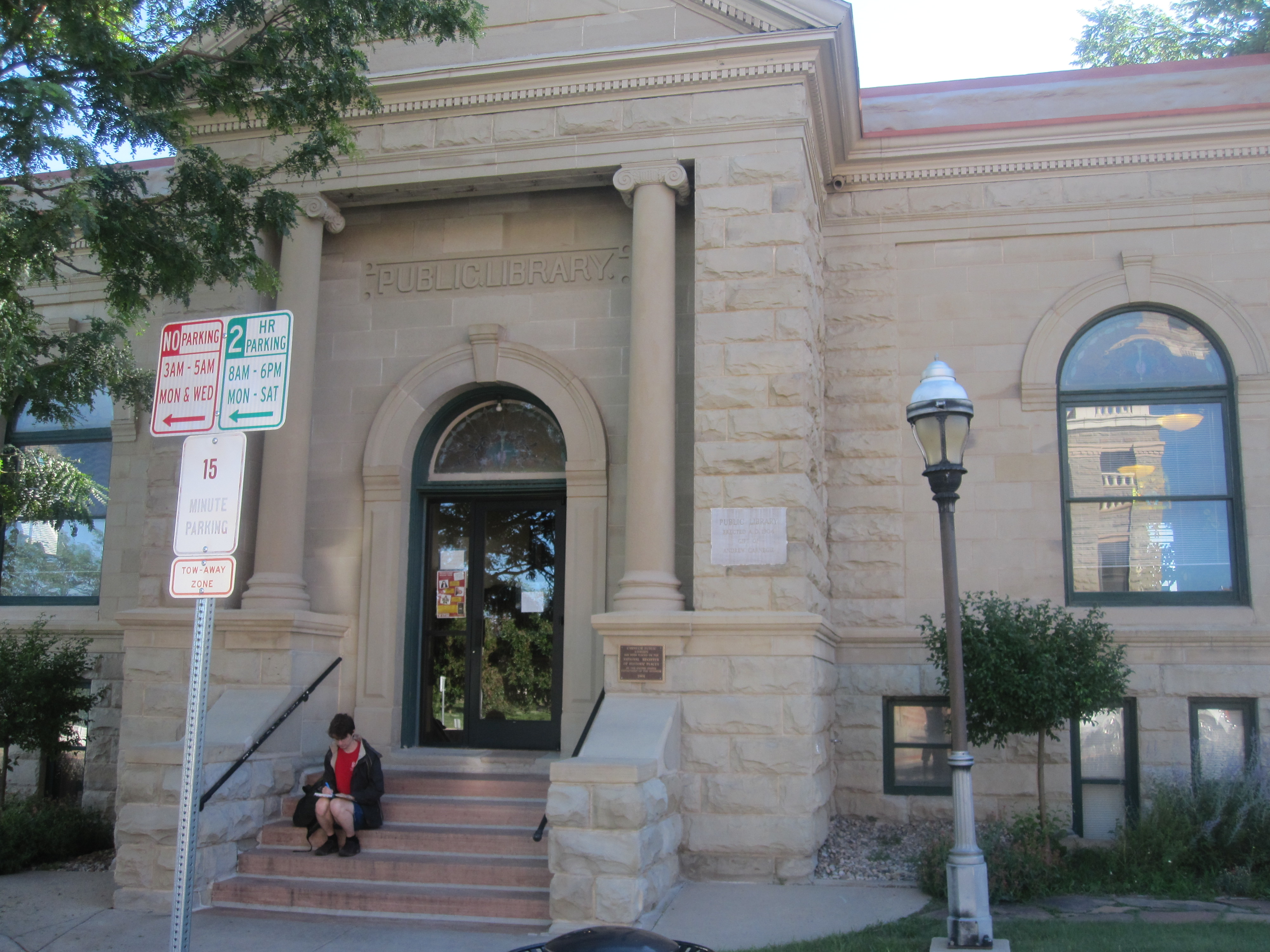
Public library in Trinidad serves Las Animas County

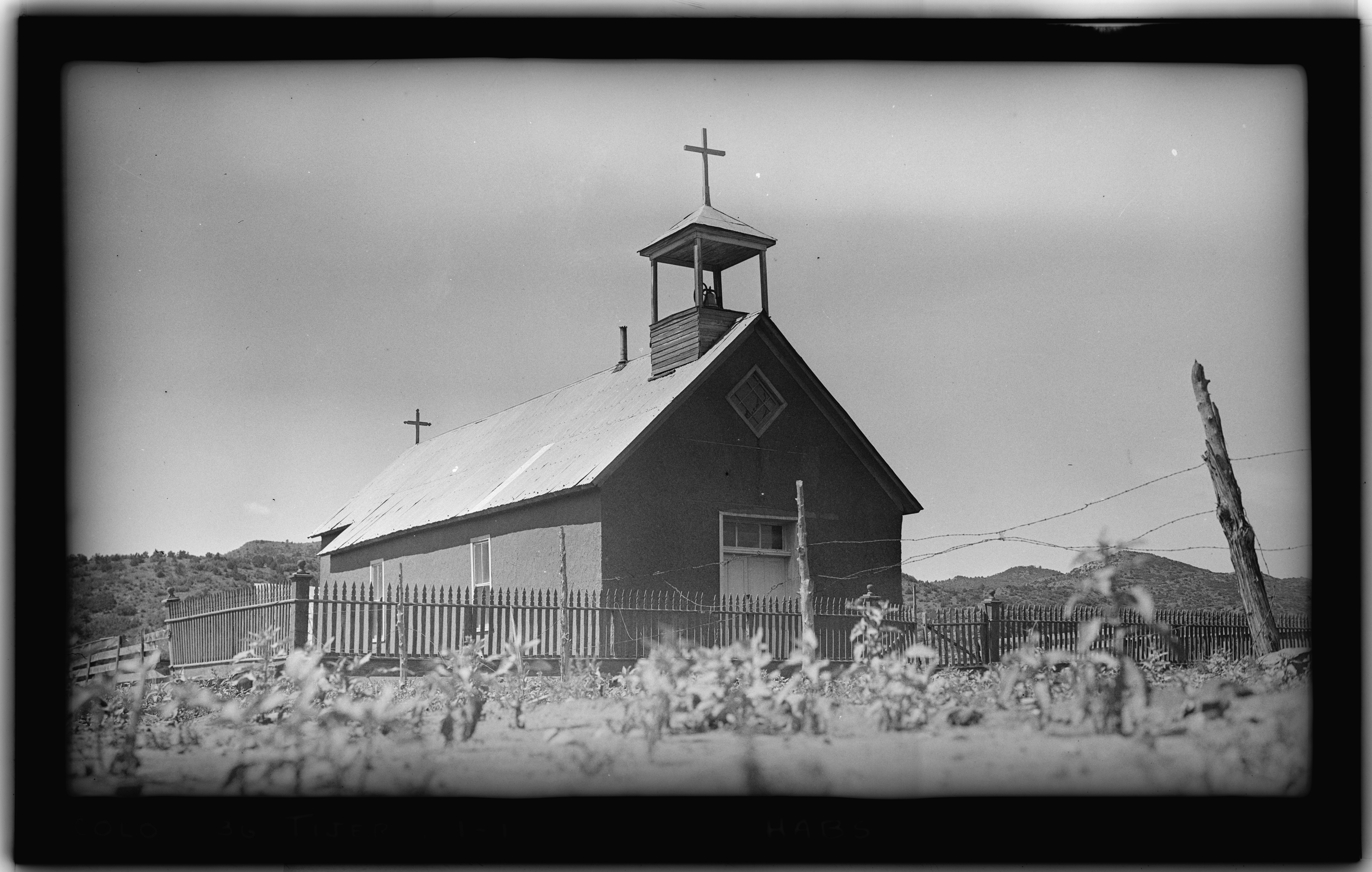
Santa Nina de Atoche church, Tijeras Plaza, Las Animas County, c.1934

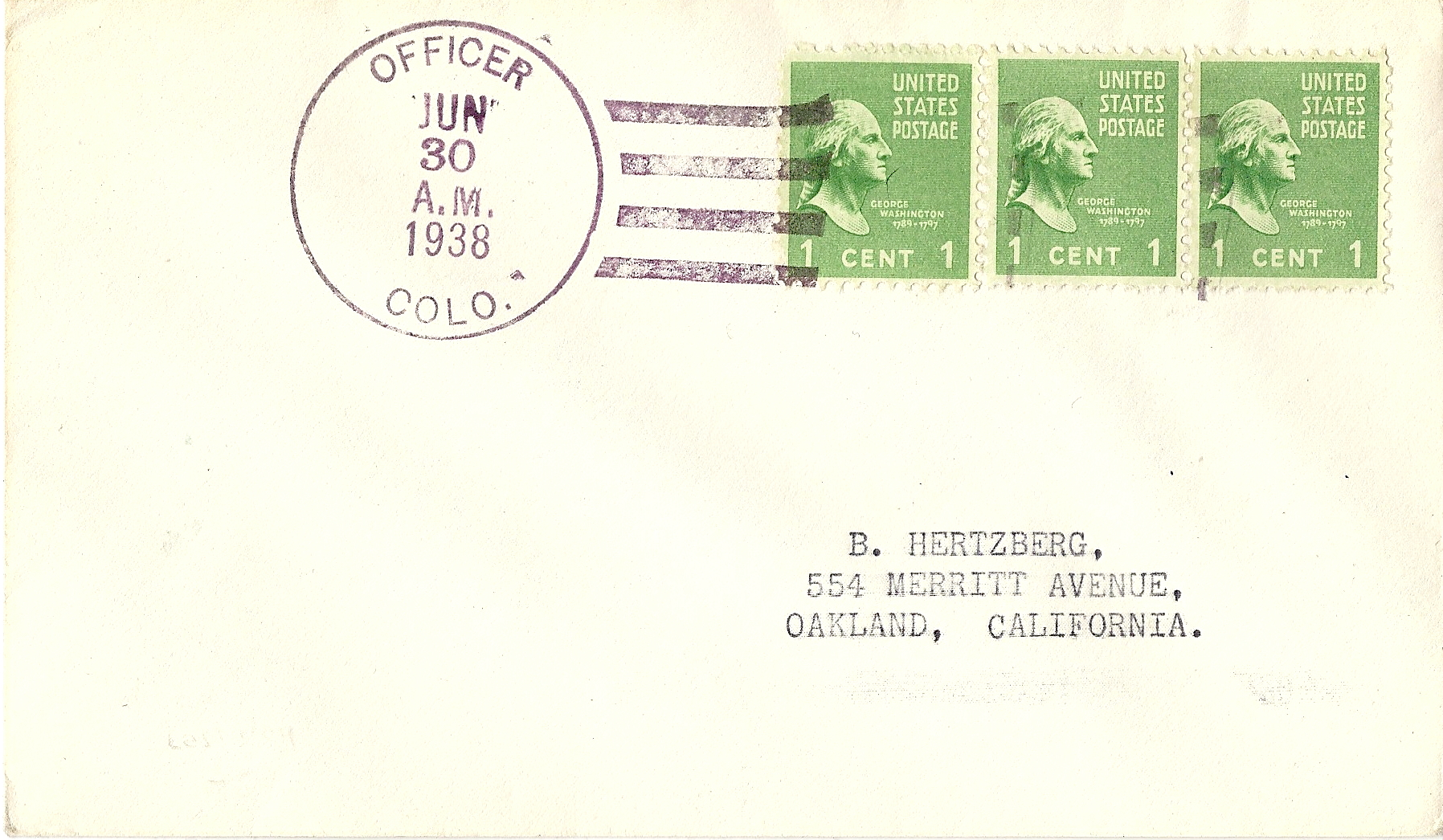
Philatelic cover postmarked Officer, Colorado on the last day of service. Mail from this discontinued post office was then handled at Villegreen, Colorado, now also a discontinued post office.

== See also ==
- Bibliography of Colorado
- Geography of Colorado
- History of Colorado
  - National Register of Historic Places listings in Las Animas County, Colorado
- Index of Colorado-related articles
- List of Colorado-related lists
  - List of counties in Colorado
- Outline of Colorado
