= Lynn, Colorado =

Census-designated place in Las Animas County, CO, USA

- Census-designated place
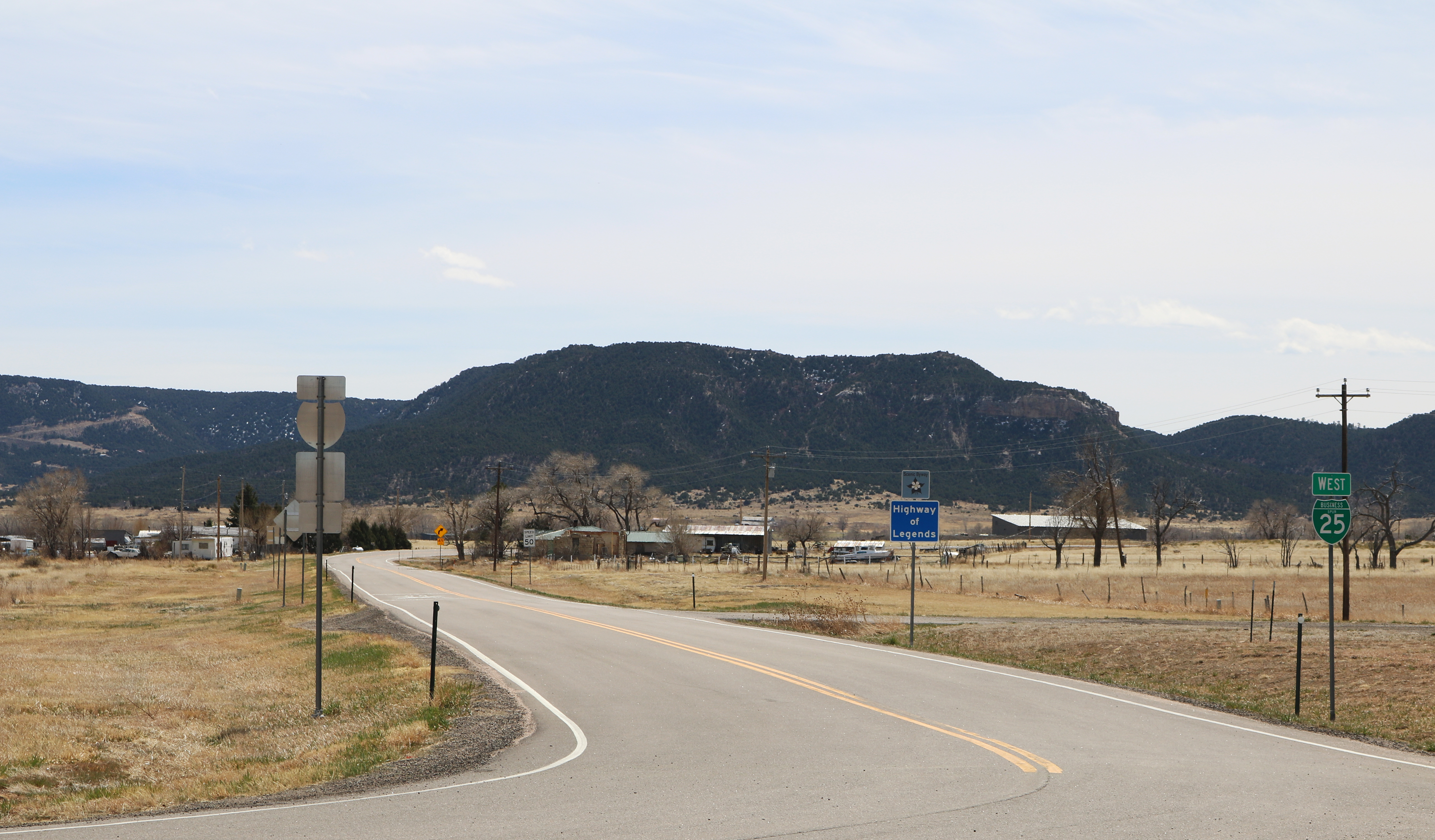
- Looking southwest along Lynn Road in Lynn.

- Location of the Lynn CDP in Las Animas County, Colorado
- Coordinates: 37°25′19″N 104°38′35″W
- Country: United States
- State: Colorado
- County: Las Animas County

Government
  - Type: Unincorporated community

Area
  - Total: 0.717 sq mi (1.857 km^{2})
  - Land: 0.717 sq mi (1.857 km^{2})
  - Water: 0 sq mi (0.000 km^{2})
- Elevation: 6,359 ft (1,938 m)

Population (2020)
  - Total: 11
  - Density: 15/sq mi (5.9/km^{2})
- Time zone: UTC-7 (MST)
  - Summer (DST): UTC-6 (MDT)
- ZIP Code: Aguilar 81020
- Area code: 719
- GNIS feature ID: 2583261

Lynn is an unincorporated community and a census-designated place (CDP) located in and governed by Las Animas County, Colorado, United States. The population of the Lynn CDP was 11 at the United States Census 2020. The Aguilar post office (Zip Code 81020) serves the area.

== Geography ==
Lynn is in northwestern Las Animas County, 20 miles (32 km) north of Trinidad, the county seat. Interstate 25 passes through the community, with access from Exit 34 (County Road 60). The town of Aguilar is 2 miles (3 km) to the southwest, and Walsenburg is 16 miles (26 km) to the north on I-25.

The Lynn CDP has an area of 459 acres (1.857 km^{2}), all land.

== Demographics ==
The United States Census Bureau initially defined the Lynn CDP for the United States Census 2010.

Lynn CDP, Colorado
Year	Pop.	±%
2010	12	—
2020	11	−8.3%
Source: United States Census Bureau

== See also ==
- Las Animas County, Colorado
