= Sopris, Colorado =

- Ghost town
- Location in Colorado Location in the United States
- Coordinates: 37°10′09″N 104°29′38″W
- Country: United States
- State: Colorado
- County: Las Animas County
- Elevation: 6,260 ft (1,908 m)
- Time zone: UTC-7 (MST)
  - Summer (DST): UTC-6 (MDT)
- ZIP code: 81082 (Trinidad)
- Area code: 719
- GNIS feature ID: 0194702

Sopris was an unincorporated community located in Las Animas County, Colorado, United States. The town is now under the surface of Trinidad Lake in Trinidad Lake State Park.

The U.S. Post Office at Trinidad (ZIP Code 81082) now serves Sopris postal addresses.

The community was named after General E. B. Sopris, a local land owner.

== Geography ==
Sopris was located approximately 5 miles West of Trinidad according to historical records.

Trinidad is at 37°10′09″N 104°29′38″W (37.169208,-104.493885). Making Sopris located somewhere near 37° 8' 3.9" N 104° 34' 27.2" W (37.134426, -104.574223).
