= Delhi, Colorado =

Unincorporated community in Colorado, US

- Unincorporated community
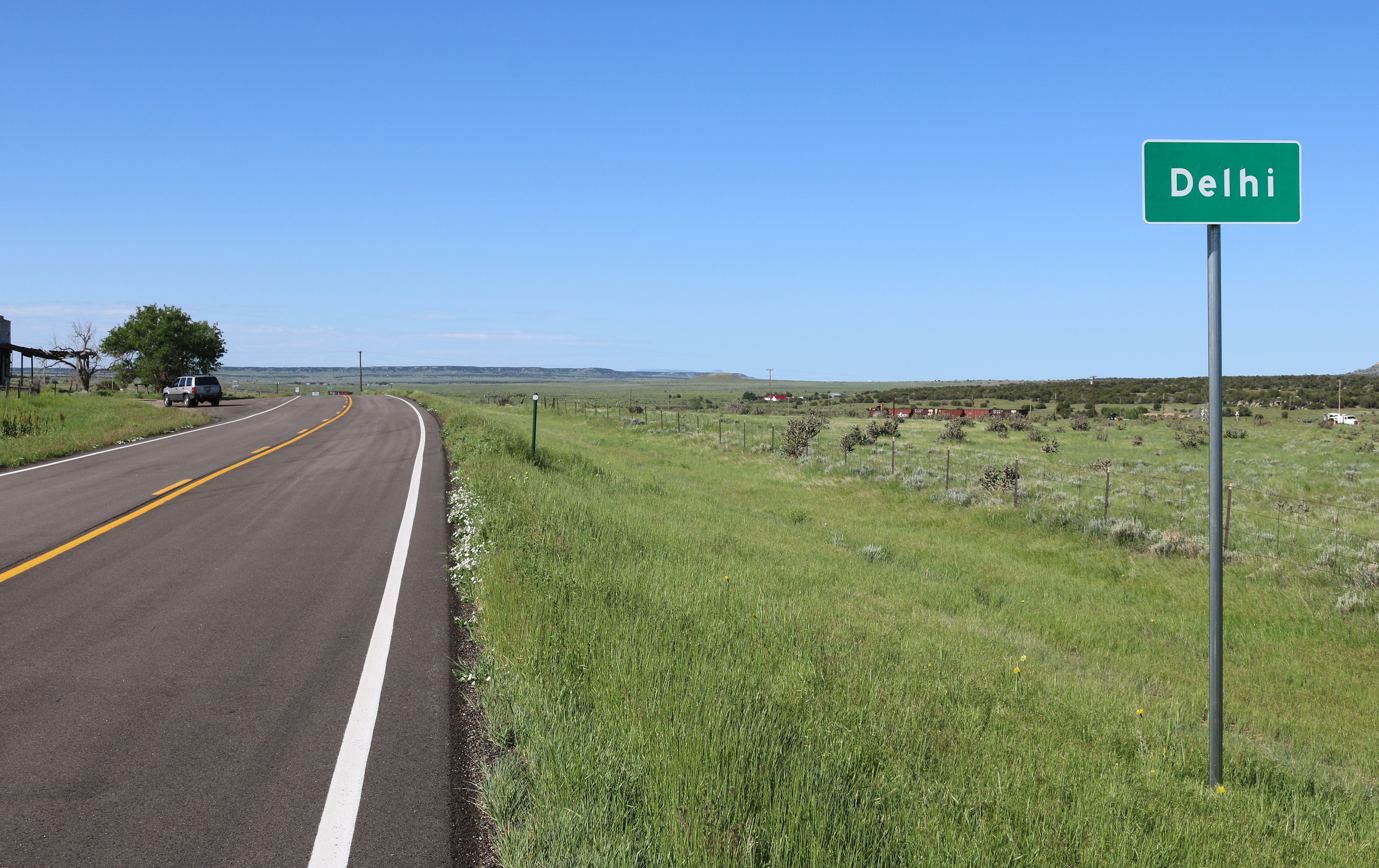

- Location of Delhi, Colorado. Delhi (Colorado)
- Coordinates: 37°38′32″N 104°01′05″W
- Country: United States
- State: Colorado
- County: Las Animas

Government
  - Type: Unincorporated community
  - Body: Las Animas County
- Elevation: 5,086 ft (1,550 m)
- Time zone: UTC−07:00 (MST)
  - Summer (DST): UTC−06:00 (MDT)
- ZIP code: (Model) 81059
- Area code: 719
- GNIS place ID: 194348

Delhi is an unincorporated community in Las Animas County, Colorado, United States.

== History ==
The Delhi, Colorado, post office operated from March 16, 1908, until May 30, 1975. The Model, Colorado, post office (ZIP code 81059) now serves the area.

Delhi was the location of a scene in the 1973 film Badlands where Martin Sheen refuels the stolen vehicle he is driving at a gas station before fleeing the scene when he spots a sheriff.

Delhi was also known for being the location of Colorado's last wigwag railroad signal prior to its removal in March 2021 (replaced with standard railroad crossing flashers).

== See also ==
- List of populated places in Colorado
