= Discontinued post office =

Post office that no longer operates

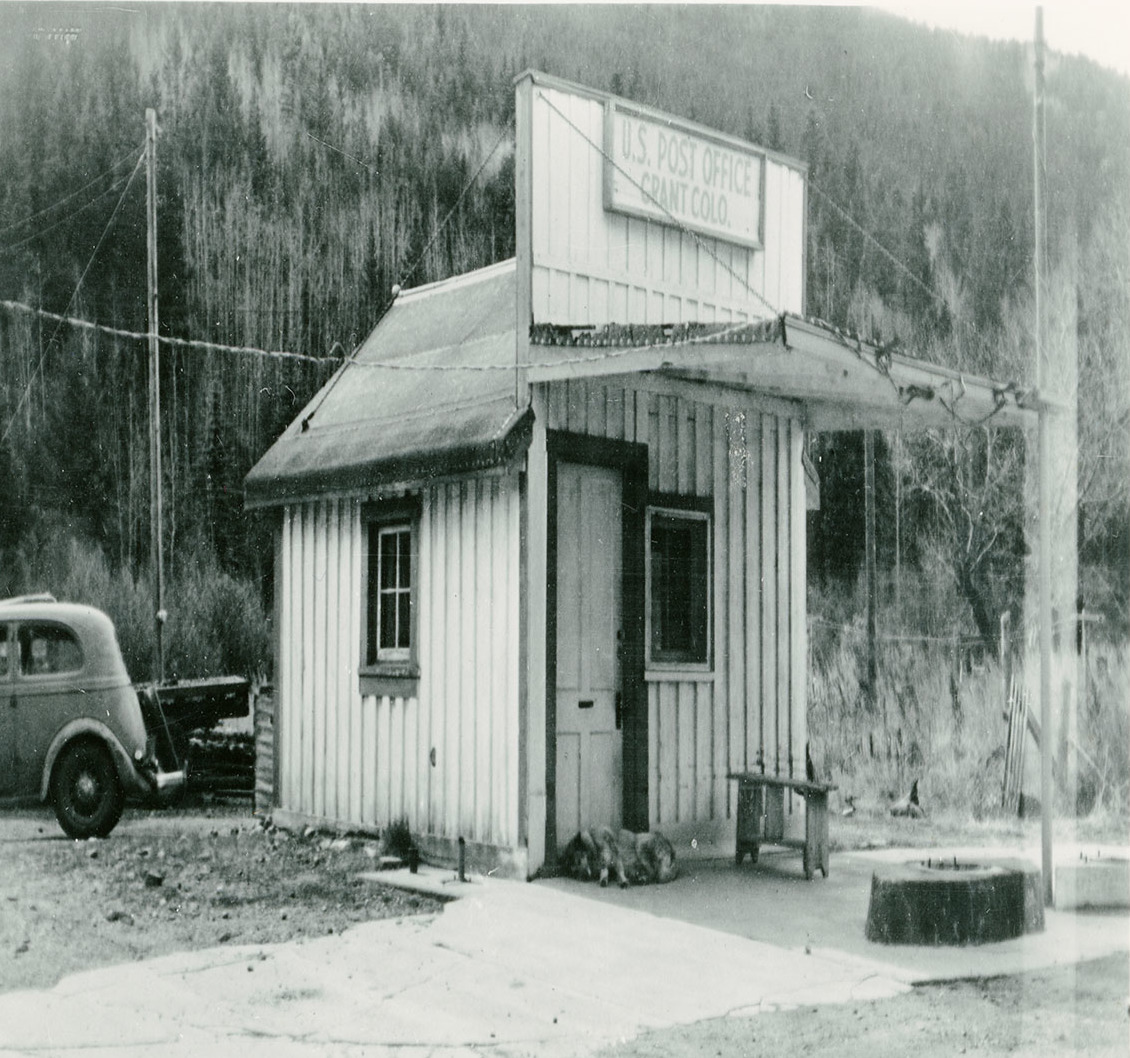
Grant, Colorado U.S. Post Office

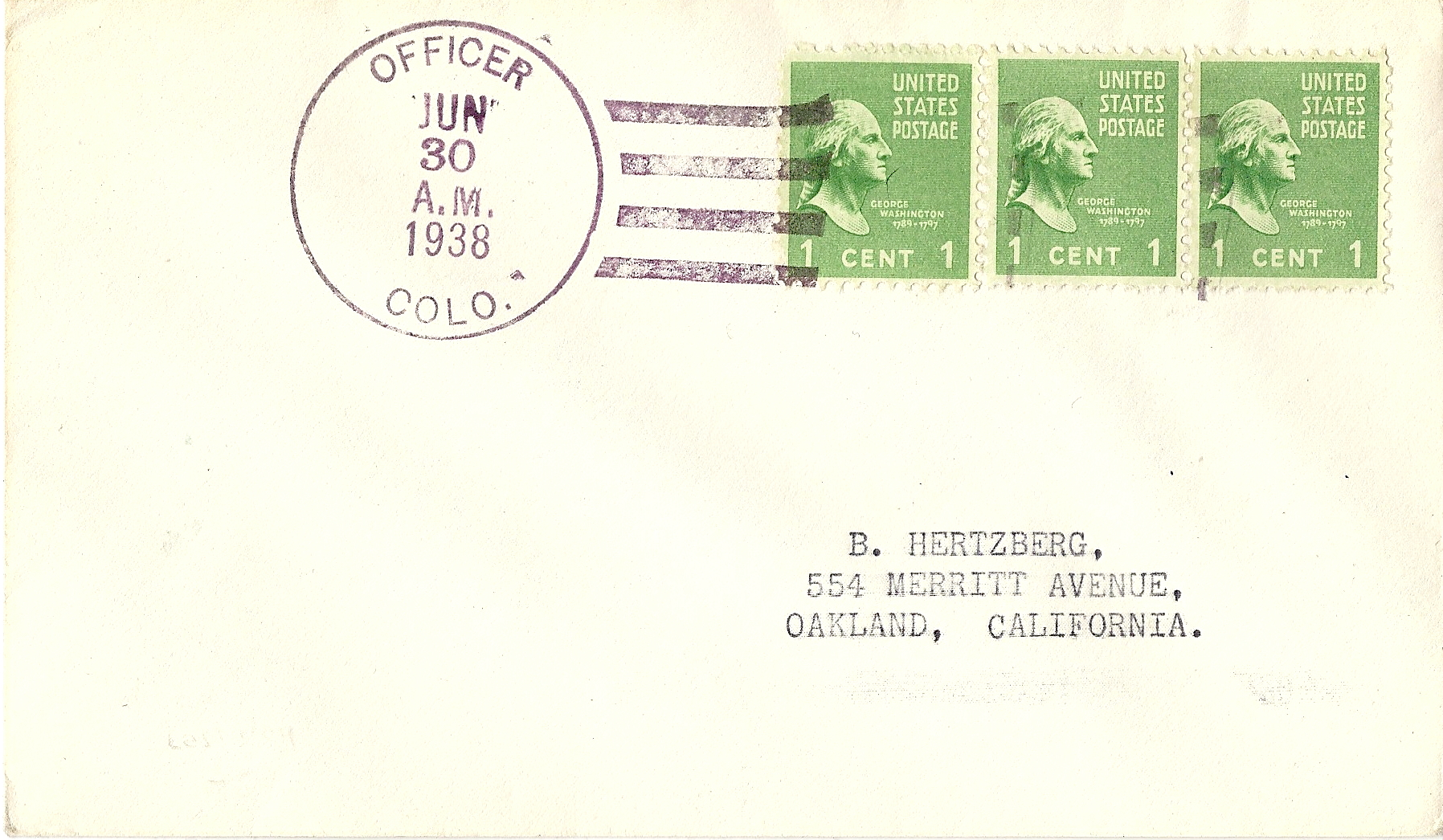
Philatelic cover postmarked Officer, Colorado on its last day of service, June 30, 1938. Officer was in eastern Las Animas County, Colorado, near Villegreen.

A discontinued post office (DPO) is an American postal term for a post office which is no longer in service or is in service under another name. Some are in ghost towns, some victims of consolidation of mail service as small post offices are closed or a city expands. The introduction of Rural Free Delivery, RFD, in 1902 led to the closure of many post offices, which peaked in 1901 at 76,945. In the United States, which was mostly rural, mail previously had been picked up in rural areas at small local post offices, home delivery being limited to urban areas until experimentation with rural delivery began in 1890.

Covers, that is letters, wrappers, or postmarks, from discontinued post offices are of interest to students of postal history. As one example, in Saguache County, Colorado, there are over 50 discontinued post offices.
