= L. Barrington Smith =

Jamaican stamp dealer

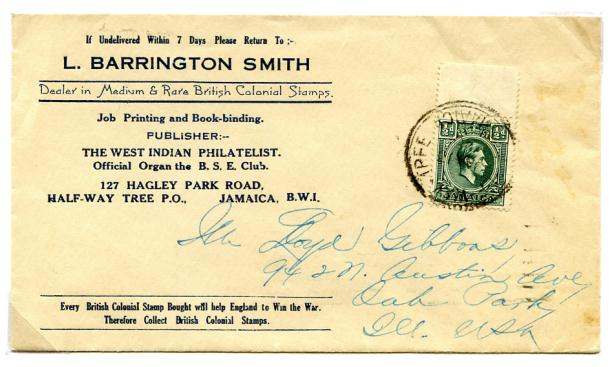
A 1940 Barrington Smith cover.

Lloyd Barrington Smith (1917 – 8 April 1992) was a Jamaican stamp dealer who is known for his patriotic covers supporting the allies during the Second World War.

== Early life and family ==
Lloyd Barrington Smith was born in 1917. He married Kathleen Dickson on 18 November 1939.

== Career ==
As a stamp dealer, Barrington Smith dealt principally in used British Commonwealth stamps, but the home-made and naive patriotic covers that he sold in bulk during the war years have become collectable in their own right. Barrington Smith traded from 1935 until about 1962, initially as a printer, soon becoming a stamp dealer and later a stamp wholesaler and supplier of "tropical novelties". He is not believed to have been connected with the Leicester, England, firm of philatelic accessory wholesalers Barrington Smith.

He traded under his own name and also as the Buccaneer Hobby Club from 127 Hagley Park Road, Half Way Tree Post Office, Jamaica, and was the publisher of The West Indian Philatelist.

== Death ==
Barrington Smith died on 8 April 1992.

== Publications ==
- Dollar Making Stamps, Half Way Tree, Jamaica: Barrington Smith Publications, 1940.
