= Trinchera, Colorado =

Unincorporated community in Las Animas County, CO, USA

- Unincorporated community
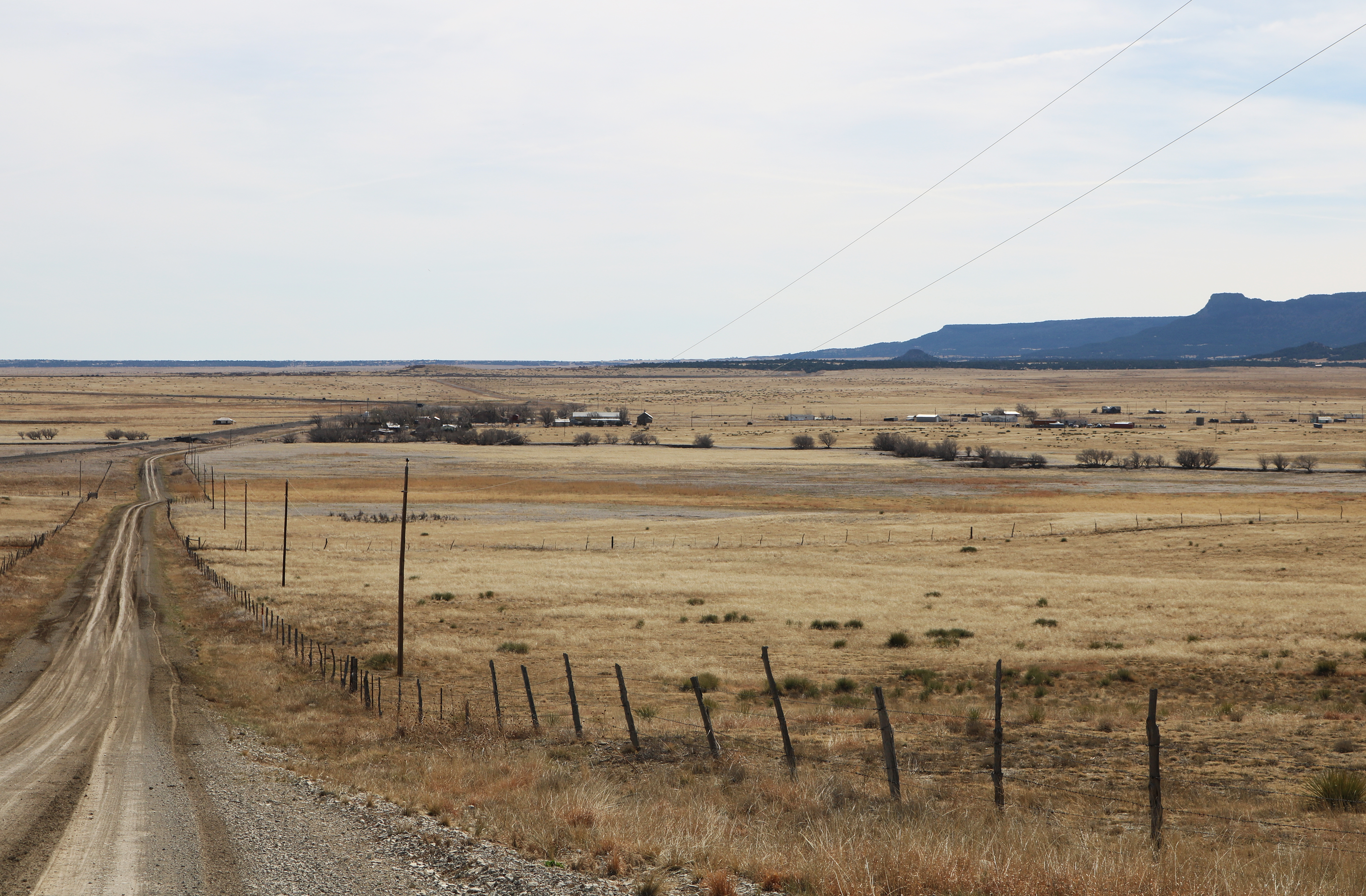
- Trinchera viewed from a hill just west of town

- Location in Colorado Location in the United States
- Coordinates: 37°02′32″N 104°02′51″W
- Country: United States
- State: Colorado
- County: Las Animas County
- Elevation: 5,791 ft (1,765 m)
- Time zone: UTC-7 (MST)
  - Summer (DST): UTC-6 (MDT)
- ZIP code: 81081
- Area code: 719
- GNIS feature ID: 204814

Trinchera is an unincorporated community and a U.S. Post Office located in Las Animas County, Colorado, United States. The Trinchera Post Office has the ZIP Code 81081.

A post office called Trinchera has been in operation since 1889. Trinchera is a name derived from Spanish meaning "trench". According to The Pueblo Chieftain, residents organized against the proposed closure of the post office in 2011, arguing that it would remove a service vital to the community.
