= Morley, Colorado =

Ghost town in Las Animas County, Colorado, United States

Coordinates: 37°01′52″N 104°30′16″W

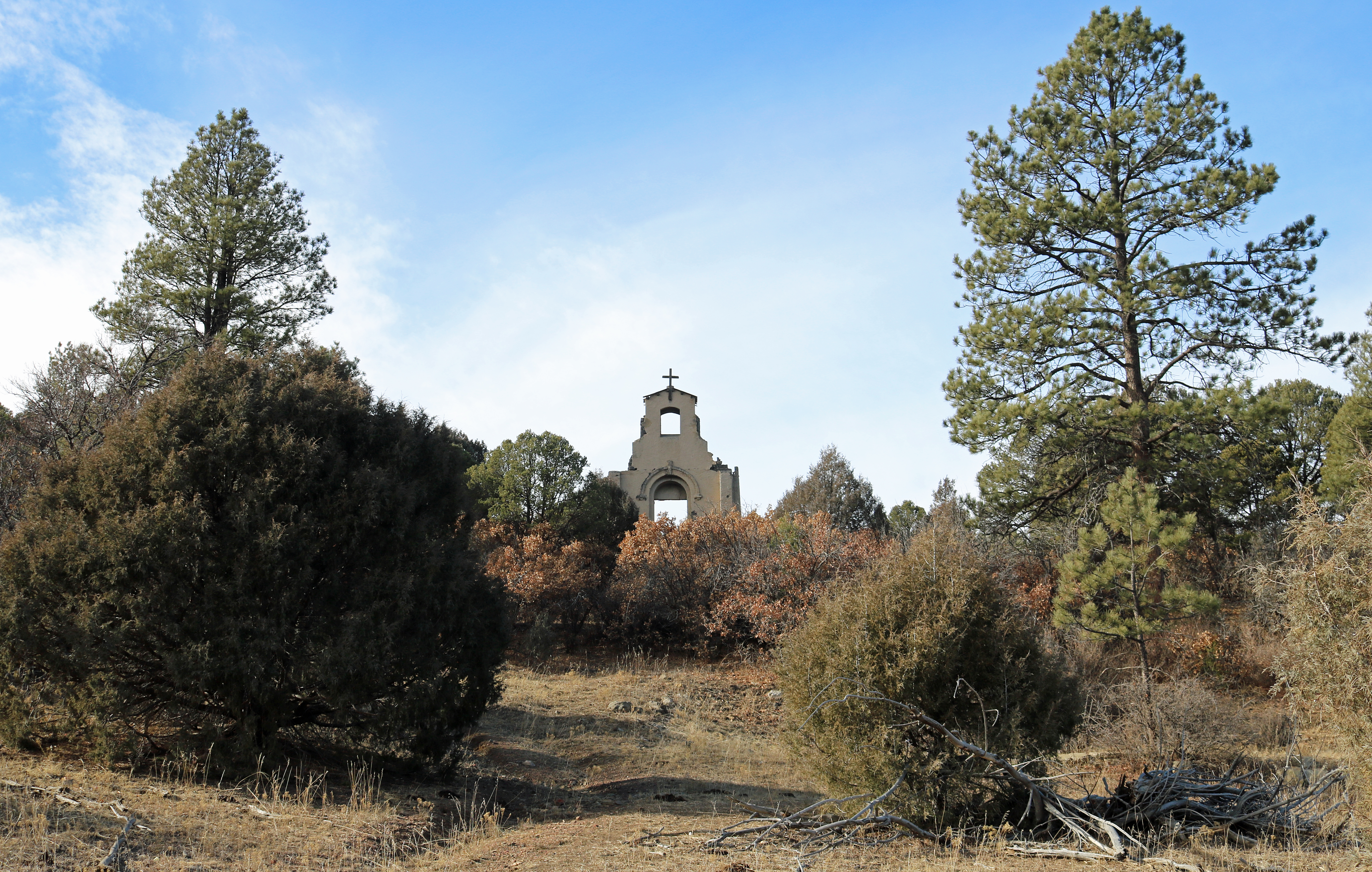
The St. Aloysius Church ruins in Morley

Morley was a town in Las Animas County, Colorado, that existed between 1878 and 1956. The town was located near the summit of Raton Pass and was originally a railroad stop, before being developed into a coal mining town by the Colorado Fuel and Iron Company (CF&I). Morley was a CF&I company town for fifty years until 1956 when the mine was closed and the town demolished.

== History ==
The site of the town was originally named Cima, which means "summit" or "high place", by Spanish traders who traveled through the region in the late 1700s and early 1800s. It was first developed by the Santa Fe Railroad Company in 1878 as a railroad stop and a place to house railroad workers. The town was built in 1906, when the land was taken over by the Colorado Fuel and Iron Company for coal mining.

The coal was mined and shipped north to CF&I's steel production plant in Pueblo, Colorado. The company owned the entire town and almost all residents were either CF&I employees or they were related to an employee. At its peak in the 1920s the town had over 600 residents, its own post office, grade school and church. The mine produced an average of 600 tons of coal per day and by the time it closed, had yielded over 11 million tons of coal. Besides being used to produce steel at the Pueblo plant, the coal was also used to power the steam-powered Santa Fe Railroad trains that came through the area, to produce electricity and to power coal processing machinery in the town itself.

CF&I officials began considering closing the mine during the recession of 1949. The quantity of coal yields had dropped to less than half of their peak level, and labor disputes were reducing the mine's cost effectiveness. Feeding and maintaining the mules became expensive, compared to the cost of using electrical equipment, like those used at the other mines. For example, the average mule consumed over 10 pounds (4.5 kg) of oats and a bale of hay per day and there were nearly 150 mules working at the mine.

CF&I began laying off workers in 1950, and by 1955 there were perhaps only two dozen workers remaining. The local school closed that year, forcing students to be bused to the city of Trinidad twenty miles north. Finally, in 1956, the mine was closed. CF&I demolished all the company buildings that remained because they didn't want to assume liability for squatters or trespassers. They did, however, leave the old St. Aloysius Catholic Church standing. The demolition crew felt it was sacrilegious to tear down "holy ground," and part of the church ruins remains to this day. Most of the former employees and their families relocated to Trinidad or to Raton, New Mexico.

Today, Interstate 25/U.S. Highway 87 and the Santa Fe/Amtrak rail line run past the former town. Some ruins can still be seen, the most notable being the old St. Aloysius Church, with its Spanish colonial style bell tower. In 2011, a real estate development group attempted to buy the land where the town and church stood. Their goal was to rebuild the church and part of the town as a tourist attraction. There would have been a coal mining museum and shops reenacting life in the town during the 1920s. But, nearby residents opposed the plan, mostly because they did not want outside visitors disturbing the peace and tranquility of the area.
