= Jansen, Colorado =

Census-designated place in Las Animas County, CO, USA

- Census-designated place
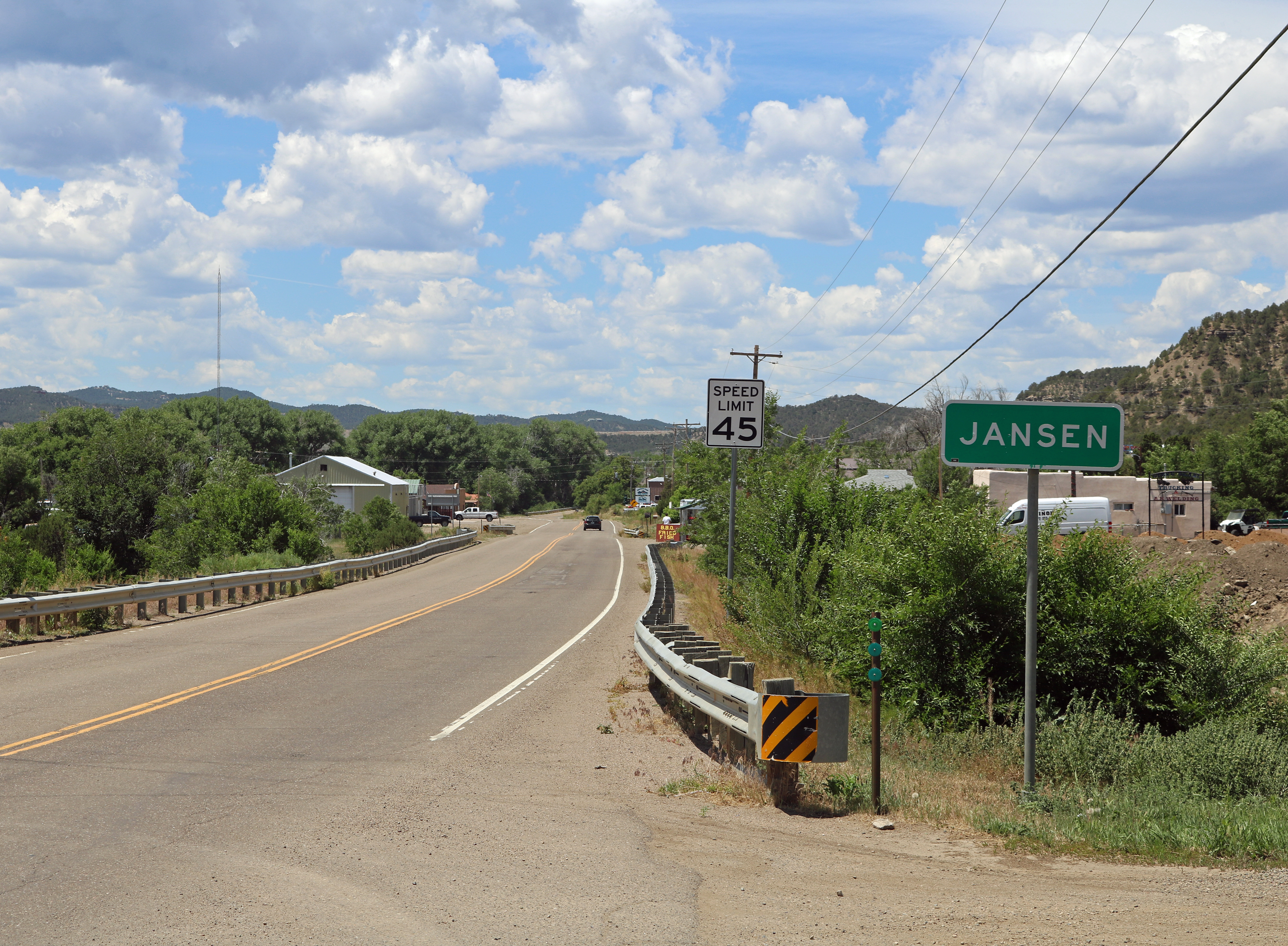
- Looking west along Colorado State Highway 12 in Jansen.

- Location of the Jansen CDP in Las Animas County, Colorado
- Coordinates: 37°09′29″N 104°33′00″W
- Country: United States
- State: Colorado
- County: Las Animas County

Government
  - Type: unincorporated community

Area
  - Total: 1.173 sq mi (3.039 km^{2})
  - Land: 1.173 sq mi (3.039 km^{2})
  - Water: 0 sq mi (0.000 km^{2})
- Elevation: 6,240 ft (1,900 m)

Population (2020)
  - Total: 101
  - Density: 86.1/sq mi (33.2/km^{2})
- Time zone: UTC-7 (MST)
  - Summer (DST): UTC-6 (MDT)
- ZIP Code: 81082
- Area code: 719
- GNIS feature id: 2583252

Jansen is an unincorporated community and a census-designated place (CDP) located in and governed by Las Animas County, Colorado, United States. The population of the Jansen CDP was 101 at the United States Census 2020. The Trinidad post office (Zip Code 81082) serves the Jansen postal addresses.

== Geography ==
Jansen is located in western Las Animas County in the valley of the Purgatoire River. Colorado State Highway 12 passes through the community, leading northeast 2 miles (3 km) to Trinidad, the county seat, and west 5 miles (8 km) to Cokedale.

The Jansen CDP has an area of 751 acres (3.039 km^{2}), all land.

== Demographics ==
The United States Census Bureau initially defined the Jansen CDP for the United States Census 2010.

Jansen CDP, Colorado
| Year | Pop. | ±% |
|---|---|---|
| 2010 | 112 | — |
| 2020 | 101 | −9.8% |
Source: United States Census Bureau

== See also ==
- Las Animas County, Colorado
