= First flight cover =

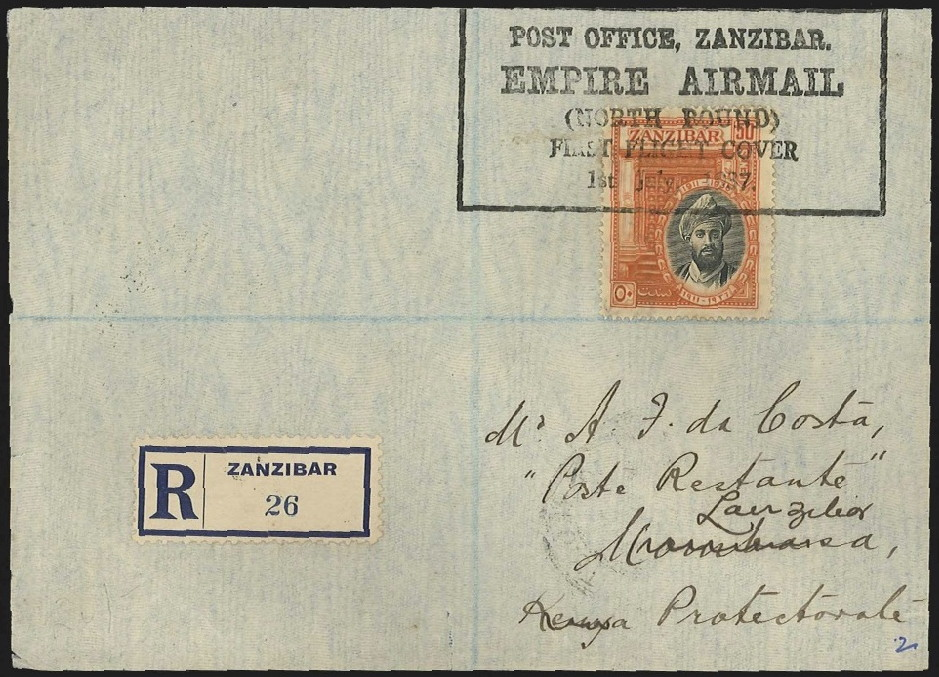
Registered first flight cover Imperial Airways Empire Airmail service from Zanzibar to Kenya on 1 July 1927 with stamp cancelled by cachet/postmark that includes the phrase "First Flight Cover"

In aerophilately, a branch of philately, a first flight cover, also known by the acronym FFC, is mail that has been carried on an inaugural flight of an airline, route, or aircraft, normally postmarked with the date of the flight often of the arrival destination proving it was actually carried on the aircraft and may have a special flight cachet and/or an arrival postmark. Because many first flight covers are essentially made as collectables they can be considered philatelic mail though others consider them to be postal history.

== Collecting first flight covers ==
With the advent of air travel it wasn't long before airplanes were carrying the mail between distant points about the globe. In the United States and Germany airmail delivery was greeted with the same national enthusiasm and fanfare as was experienced with the first trips to the moon by US astronauts. Consequently, many people sent philatelic mail to themselves or friends that was carried aboard these flights in order to get a souvenir of the historic event. Covers carried aboard these flights are very popular and famous in some cases. The United States Post Office Department recognised the potential in providing first flight cover services to philatelists quite early on and in 1926 The Postal Bulletin carried extensive instructions for postmasters to ensure appropriate circulation took place and proper markings were added.

Due to the small loads carried on early first flights, these covers are scarce, in demand and expensive. Following the First World War regular and special flights increased significantly to the extent that some modern flight are so commercial that thousands of covers are carried that no pilot could ever possibly sign. Thus collectors may find it difficult to cope with the quantity and diversity of first flight covers available to collect forcing them to specialise though some catalogues exist to help them such as the American Air Mail Catalogue.

== Early first flights ==
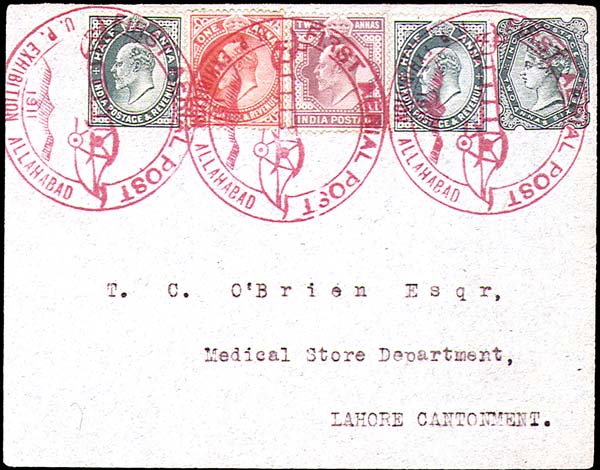
Allahabad cover flown on the world's first aerial post in 1911

The first official postal delivery flight between two towns took place on February 18, 1911, during the United Provinces Industrial and Agricultural Exhibition in India. The young French pilot Henri Pequet carried mail from the exhibition location Allahabad to Naini, which is approx. 8 km away. It took Henri Pequet and his biplane "Sommer" about 13 minutes for the distance. The carried covers were provided with the large circular bright magenta postmark "First Aerial Post, U.P. Exhibition Allahabad 1911" and a few cards were autographed by the pilot. Pequet carried about 6,000 cards and letters on his journey.

The United Kingdom's first and only official pre-World War I airmail flight took place in 1911 to mark the coronation of King George V flying mail between London (Hendon Aerodrome) and Windsor from September 9–15 carrying 926 pounds of mail. The following year a German Reichspost postal flight took place between Mannheim and Heidelberg on which first flight postcards were carried.

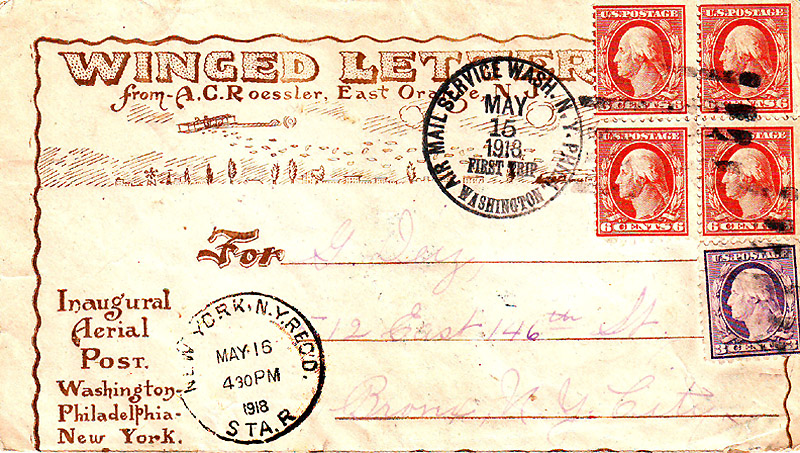
An A.C. Roessler cover carried on the first scheduled U.S. Air Mail flight from Washington, D.C., to New York City, May 15, 1918

The first scheduled U.S. Air Mail service began on May 15, 1918, and carried mail from Washington, D.C., to New York City. The type of airplane used was the U.S. Army Curtiss JN-4 "Jenny" biplanes flown by Army pilots with an intermediate stop in Philadelphia (Bustleton Field). Among those who were on hand for the departure of the first flight from Washington, D.C., were President Woodrow Wilson, U.S. Postmaster General Albert S. Burleson, and Assistant Secretary of the Navy Franklin D. Roosevelt. Army Lt. George L. Boyle was selected to pilot aircraft #38262 on the first Northbound flight which, unfortunately, turned out to be a somewhat less than successful initial venture.

== See also ==
- First day cover
- Philatelic mail
