= Trinidad Lake State Park =

Park in Las Animas County, Colorado

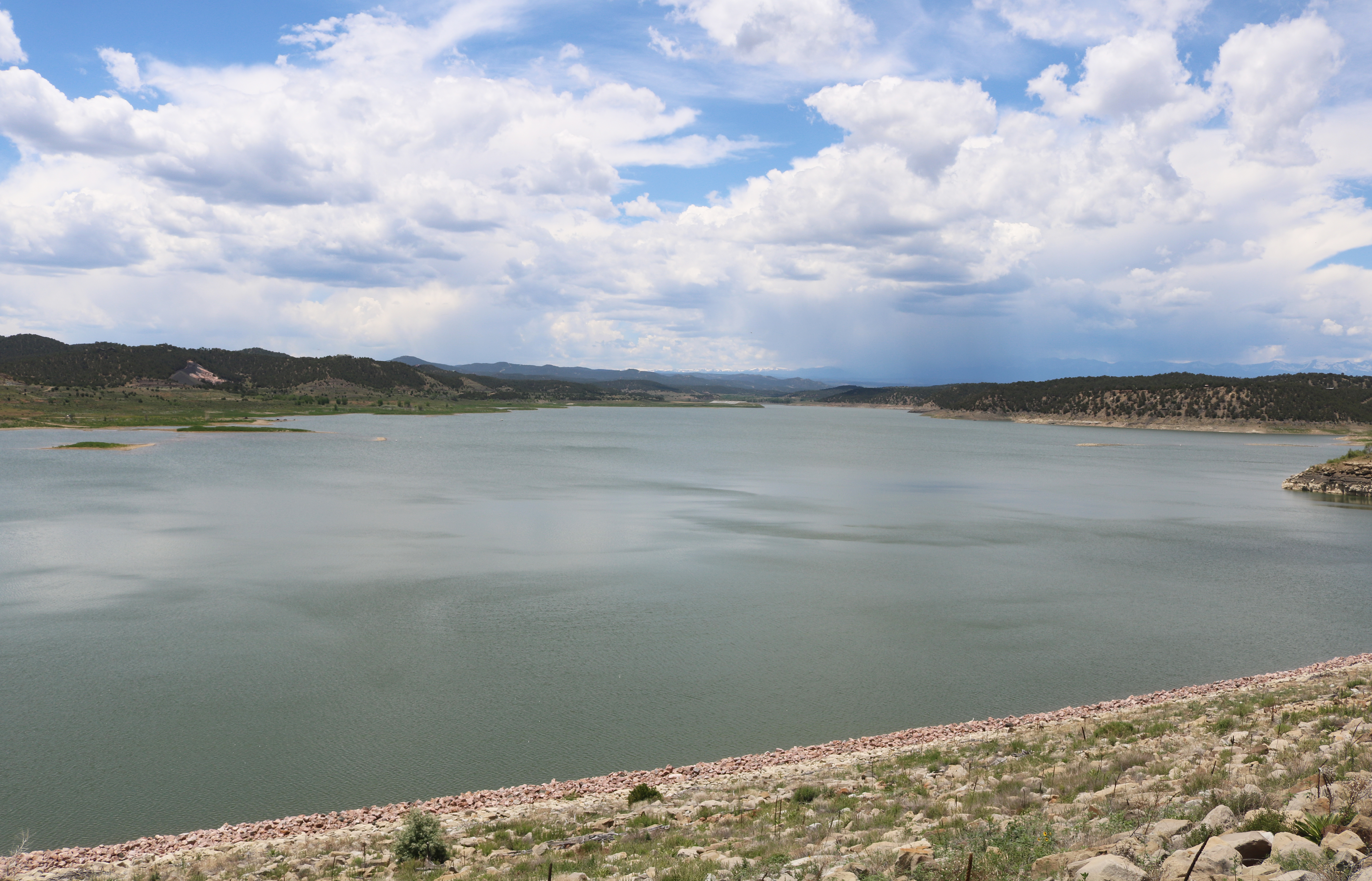
- A view from the top of the dam.

- Location within Colorado
- Location: Las Animas County, Colorado, United States
- Nearest city: Trinidad, CO
- Coordinates: 37°08′44″N 104°34′13″W
- Area: 2,860 acres (1,160 ha)
- Established: 1980
- Visitors: 300,576 (in 2021)
- Governing body: Colorado Parks & Wildlife

Trinidad Lake State Park is a state park 4 miles (6.4 km) west of Trinidad, Colorado, United States. The park protects Trinidad Lake, a dammed reservoir. There are hiking trails, and camping and boating opportunities. The park features historical attractions such as the coal mining ruins at Cokedale. An exposure of the Cretaceous–Paleogene boundary (K–Pg boundary) is visible in the southern part of the park.

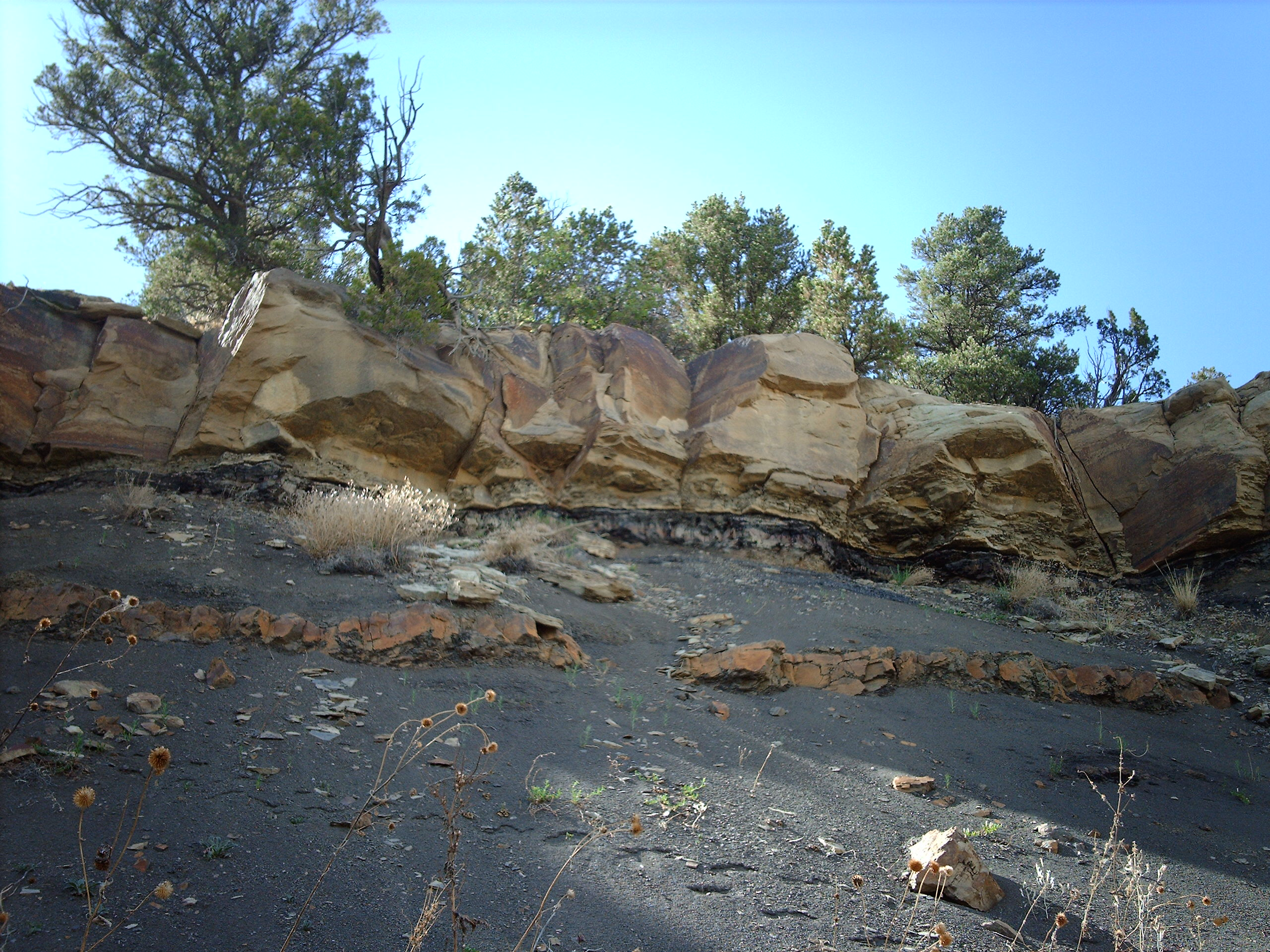
Exposure of the K–T boundary at Trinidad Lake State Park

A portion of the mountain route of the Santa Fe Trail runs through the park.

== See also ==
- Fishers Peak State Park
