= Model, Colorado =

Unincorporated community in Las Animas County, CO, USA

- Unincorporated community
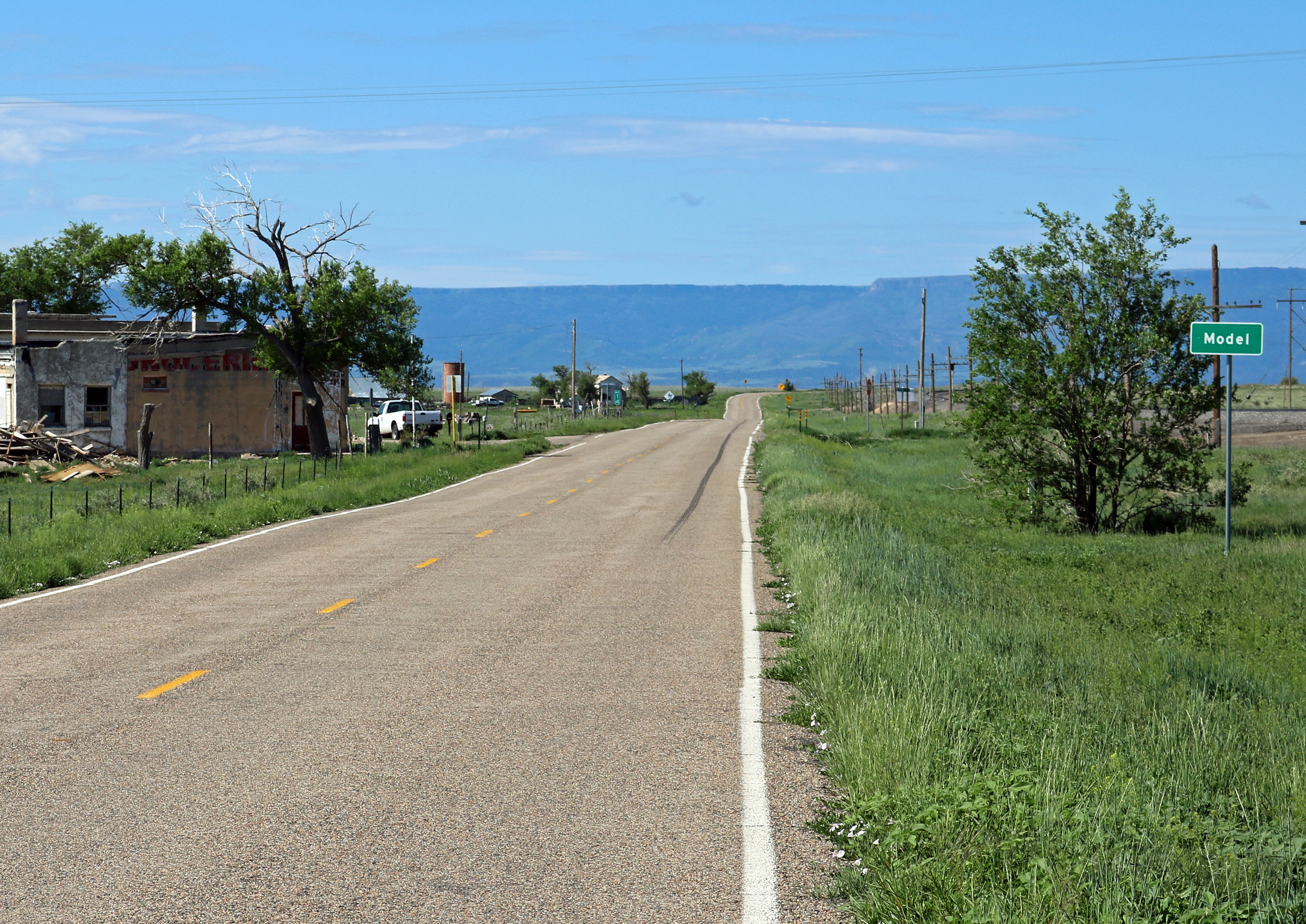
- Looking south along U.S. Route 350 in Model

- Location in Colorado Location in the United States
- Coordinates: 37°22′20″N 104°14′42″W
- Country: United States
- State: Colorado
- County: Las Animas
- Elevation: 5,617 ft (1,712 m)
- Time zone: UTC-7 (MST)
  - Summer (DST): UTC-6 (MDT)
- ZIP code: 81059
- Area code: 719
- GNIS feature ID: 204809

Model is an unincorporated community with a U.S. Post Office in Las Animas County, Colorado, United States. The Model Post Office has the ZIP Code 81059 and has been in operation since 1912. The community originally was a planned, or "model" community, hence the name.
