= Villegreen, Colorado =

Unincorporated community in Las Animas County, CO, USA

- Unincorporated community
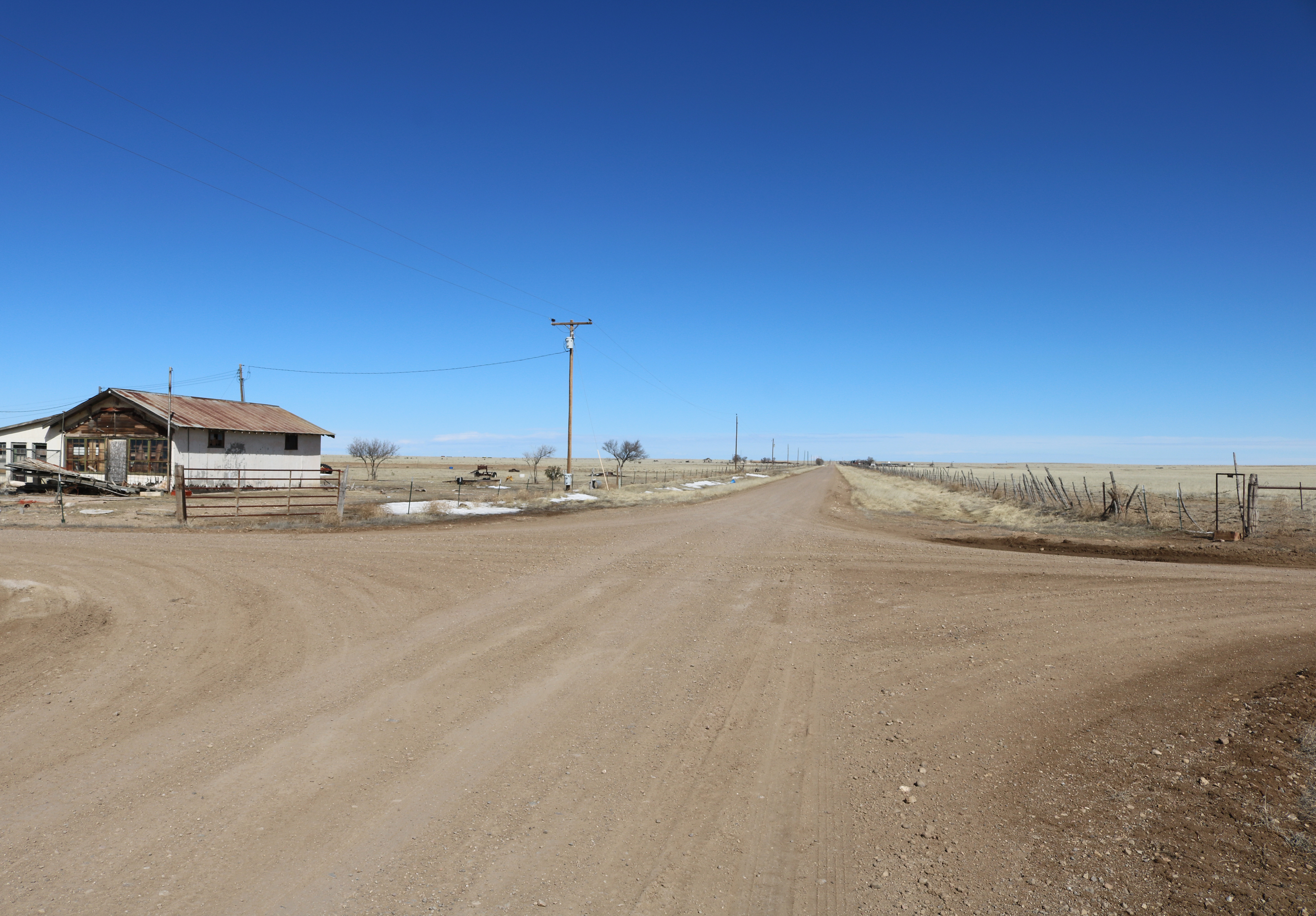
- Villegreen in 2019

- Location in Colorado Location in the United States
- Coordinates: 37°18′21″N 103°31′13″W
- Country: United States
- State: Colorado
- County: Las Animas County
- Elevation: 5,643 ft (1,720 m)
- Time zone: UTC-7 (MST)
  - Summer (DST): UTC-6 (MDT)
- ZIP code: 81049 (Kim)
- Area code: 719
- GNIS feature ID: 196201

Villegreen is an unincorporated community located in Las Animas County, Colorado, United States. Villegreen is approximately 66 driving miles east of the county seat of Trinidad, Colorado, and almost an equal distance west of Springfield, Colorado, the seat of neighboring Baca County. The U.S. Post Office at Kim (ZIP Code 81049) now serves Villegreen postal addresses.
