= Boncarbo, Colorado =

Unincorporated community in Las Animas County, Colorado, United States

- Unincorporated community
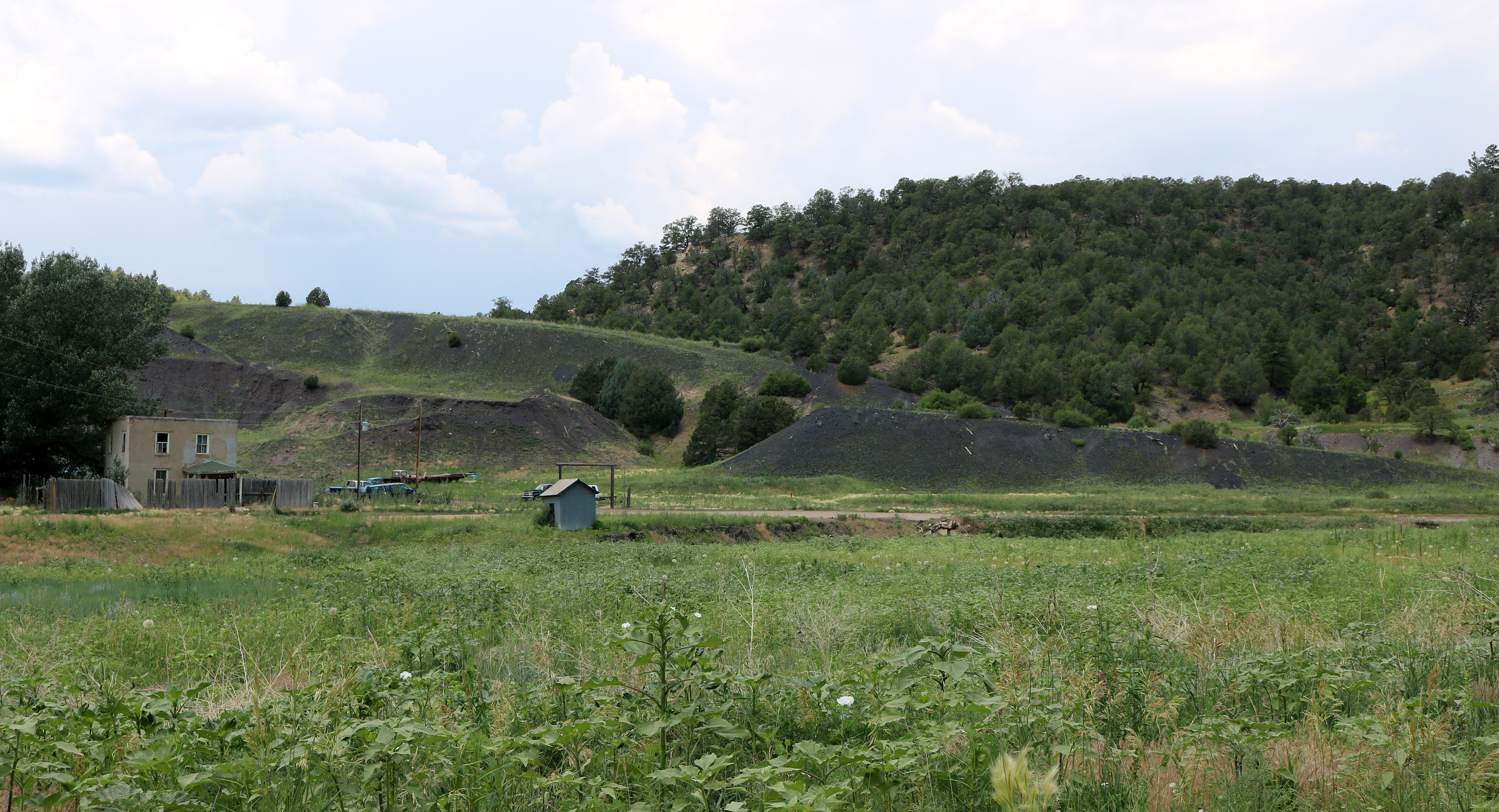
- An old house and a slag heap in Boncarbo

- Location of Boncarbo, Colorado. Boncarbo (Colorado)
- Coordinates: 37°13′00″N 104°41′42″W
- Country: United States
- State: Colorado
- County: Las Animas
- Established: 1915

Government
  - Type: Unincorporated community
  - Body: Las Animas County
- Elevation: 6,877 ft (2,096 m)
- Time zone: UTC−07:00 (MST)
  - Summer (DST): UTC−06:00 (MDT)
- ZIP Code: 81024
- GNIS pop ID: 194660

Boncarbo is an unincorporated community in Las Animas County, Colorado, United States. The ZIP Code of Boncarbo is 81024.

== History ==
The town of Boncarbo was established by the American Smelting and Refining Company in 1915. Boncarbo is a corruption of the French bon carbon, meaning good coal. The Boncarbo, Colorado, post office operated from November 15, 1917, until August 12, 2017. Most of the coal mined at Boncarbo was sent to Cokedale for coking.

== See also ==
- List of populated places in Colorado
