= Philatelic cover =

Stamped envelope for collectors

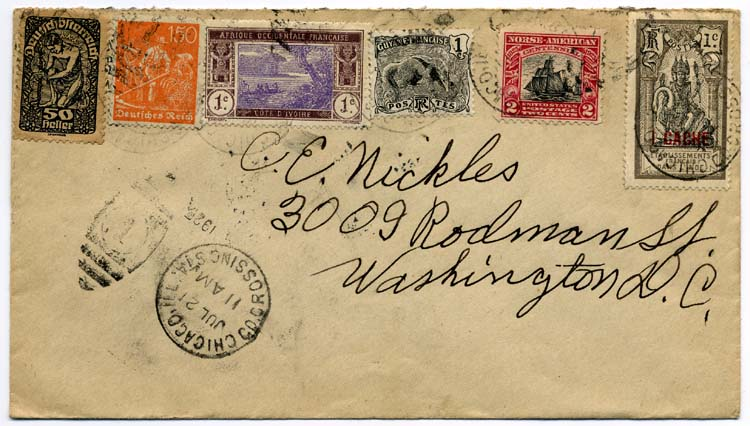
A 1925 philatelic cover, produced by adding common foreign stamps to a usage of a United States 2-cent of the "Norse-American issue". The postal clerk should have rejected this cover, but instead the foreign stamps received US postmarks. From left to right, the stamps are from Austria, Germany, Ivory Coast, French Guiana, United States, and French India.

A philatelic cover is an envelope prepared with a stamp(s) and address and sent through the mail delivery system for the purpose of creating a collectible item. Stamp collectors began to send mail to each other and to themselves early on, and philatelic mail is known from the late 19th century onward. While some collectors specialize in philatelic covers, especially first day covers and cacheted covers, others regard them as contrived objects that are not reflective of real-world usage, and often will pay a higher price for a cover that represents genuine commercial use. However, mail sent by stamp collectors is no less a genuine article of postage than is mail sent with no concern of seeing the mailed item again. Philatelic covers include mail from first airmail flight and first day of stamp issues ceremonies. Over the years there have been numerous Expositions where special postmarks are made and where a post office is set up where mail can be sent from on the given date of the Expo'. Like any other genuine item of mail these covers include postage stamps and postmarks of the time period and were processed and delivered by an official postal system. Often a philatelic cover will have more historical significance than randomly mailed covers as philatelic covers are also often mailed from the location on the date of an important or noteworthy event, like an inauguration or a space launch.

== Types ==
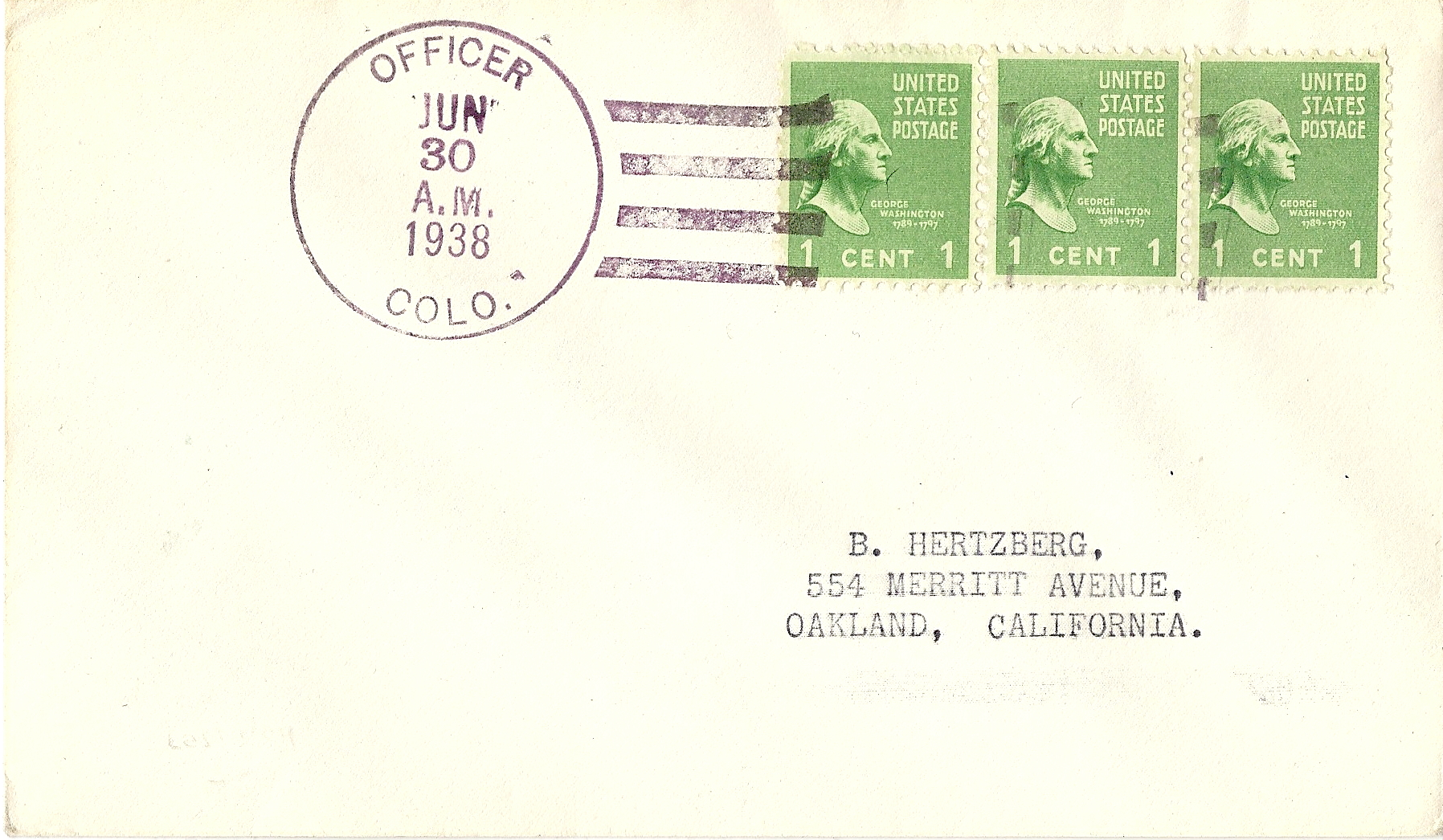
Last day of service cover from the discontinued post office at Officer, Colorado

The possible kinds of philatelic covers are only limited by the imagination of creative collectors, but there are a number of well-known categories:

- First day covers, mailed on the first day of issue of a stamp.
- Cacheted covers, sent on envelopes with additional artwork, usually relating to the theme of the stamp.
- Covers with special or commemorative cancellations used temporarily by a post office.
- Covers with cancellations from unusual places.
- Covers sent to collect particular postal markings.
- "One of everything" cover, all stamps of a new or old issue affixed to the cover.
- Unnecessary mixed frankings.
- Last day of service of a discontinued post office

== Identifying philatelic covers ==
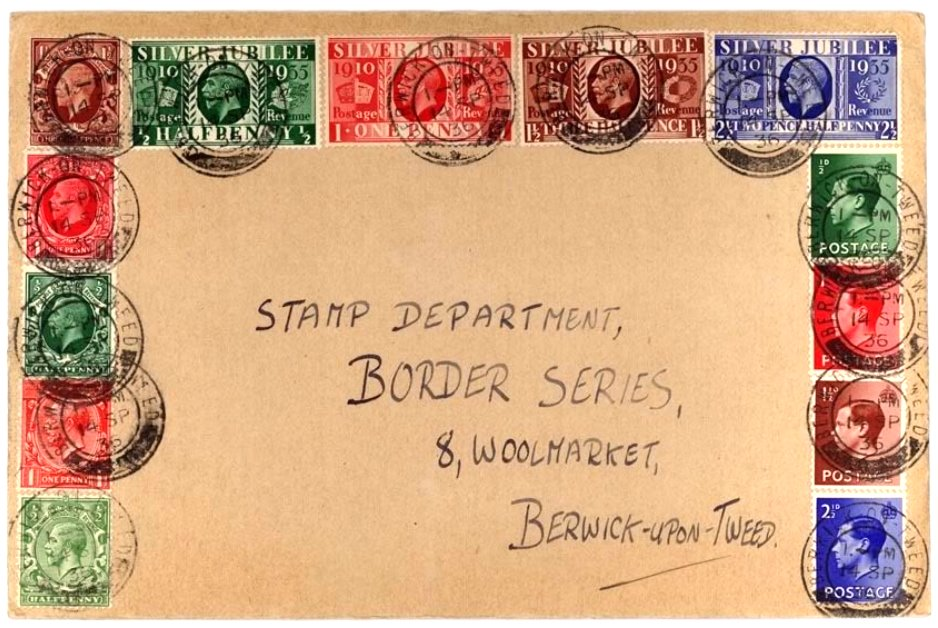
Not all philatelic covers are as obvious as this one.

Philatelic covers are normally very easy to spot but sometimes they can escape detection by the inexperienced philatelist. Characteristics include:

- The cover is still sealed and appears to be empty.
- The stamps used are far above that needed for the postal service used.
- The cover is addressed to a well known dealer.
- The stamps include a full set of one particular issue, possibly applied in order of value.
- The stamps are applied very tidily and/or the postmark appears to have been very carefully applied so as not to obscure too much of the stamps.
- The cover bears a cachet or special design, usually on the left side portion of the envelope.
- The address consists of a small rubber stamp or adhesive label in the bottom right hand corner of the cover.
- The cover has a rarely seen combination of stamps, for instance with stamps that were issued many years apart.

While many philatelists prefer genuine commercial covers to philatelically contrived covers, philatelic covers may still be acceptable in collections of countries and eras where few other covers exist. Whether the cover was contrived or not, it is still an item of mail sent through the same postal system as other covers from a given country, with a postage stamp(s) and postmark, and is often more historically significant than covers set with no intention of recovery.

== Famous philatelic covers ==
Various types of covers, usually prepared by collectors, historians or other enthusiasts, have great historical significance and, regardless of the intention for the mailed item, are sometimes noteworthy or famous in their own right.

=== Zeppelin mail ===
Among the most definitive examples of famous or popular philatelic covers is Zeppelin mail. These are covers that were carried aboard zeppelins in the 1930s and bear special postmarks and other special markings. Because the new Zeppelins were the fastest way to get mail delivered across the Atlantic Ocean they carried a great deal of mail. Because of all the fanfare surrounding the Zeppelins most of mail carried aboard were Zeppelin first flight covers. Much of the funding for the Zeppelin delivery system was generated by collectors and other enthusiasts of the period. Because of the fast mail delivery service there was a lot of commercial mail aboard these vessels. Mail service across the Atlantic Ocean was reduced from weeks to a few days. Hindenburg’s 2-1/2 day service was the fastest way to send mail between Europe and North America in 1936.

=== First flight mail ===
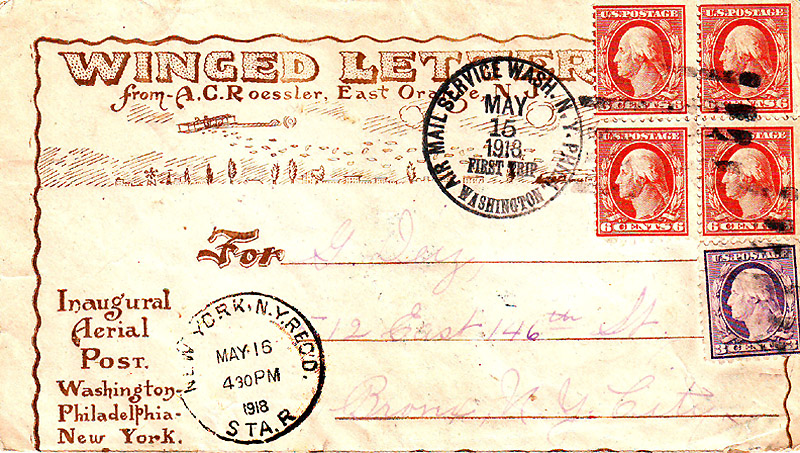
An A.C. Roessler cover carried on the first scheduled U.S. Air Mail flight from Washington, DC, to New York City, May 15, 1918

With the advent of air travel it wasn't long before airplanes were carrying the mail between distant points about the globe. In the United States and Germany Air Mail delivery was greeted with the same national enthusiasm and fanfare as was experienced with the first trips to the moon by US Astronauts. Consequently, many people sent philatelic mail to themselves or friends that was carried aboard these flights in order to get a souvenir of the historic event. First flight covers carried aboard are very popular and famous in some cases. The first scheduled U.S. Air Mail service began on May 15, 1918, and carried mail from Washington, DC, to New York City. The type of airplane used was the U.S. Army Curtiss JN-4 "Jenny" biplanes flown by army pilots with an intermediate stop in Philadelphia (Bustleton Field). Among those who were on hand for the departure of the first flight from Washington, D.C., were President Woodrow Wilson, U.S. Postmaster General Albert S. Burleson, and Assistant Secretary of the Navy Franklin D. Roosevelt. Army Lt. George L. Boyle was selected to pilot aircraft #38262 on the first Northbound flight, which turned out to be a somewhat less than successful initial venture.

== See also ==
- Airmails of the United States
- Apollo Insurance Covers
- Cover (philately)
