= Area code 719 =

Colorado telephone area code

Coordinates: 38°0′0″N 104°0′0″W

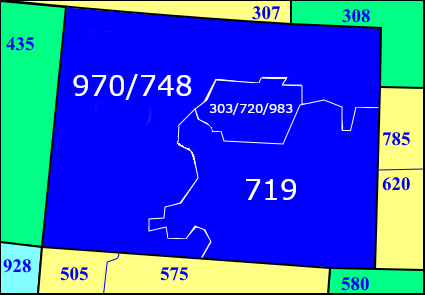
Numbering plan areas of Colorado (blue) and area codes.

Area code 719 is a telephone area code in the North American Numbering Plan (NANP) for the U.S. state of Colorado. The numbering plan area (NPA) includes Colorado Springs, Pueblo, Monument, Leadville, Alamosa, Monte Vista, the San Luis Valley, Cañon City, Trinidad, Rocky Ford, La Junta, Walsenburg and southeastern Colorado. It was created in a split of area code 303 in 1988.

== History ==
In 1947, the American Telephone and Telegraph Company designated the entire state of Colorado as a single numbering plan area in the first nationwide telephone numbering plan for Operator Toll Dialing. The state was assigned area code 303 as one of the eighty-six original North American area codes. It remained the state's sole area code for 40 years. By the late 1980s, demand for telephone services, particularly in the Denver/Boulder area, threatened exhaustion of central office prefixes. In mitigation, the numbering area was divided on March 5, 1988, and southeastern Colorado, including Colorado Springs and Pueblo, received the new area code 719.

Prior to October 2021, area code 719 had telephone numbers assigned for the central office code 988. In 2020, 988 was designated nationwide as a dialing code for the National Suicide Prevention Lifeline, which created a conflict for exchanges that permit seven-digit dialing. This area code was therefore scheduled to transition to ten-digit dialing by October 24, 2021.

== See also ==
- Geography of Colorado
- List of North American Numbering Plan area codes
- List of populated places in Colorado

Colorado area codes: 303/720/983, 719, 748/970
	North: 303/720/983, 970	
West: 970	719	East: 620, 785
	South: 575, 580	
Kansas area codes: 316, 620, 785, 913
New Mexico area codes: 505, 575
Oklahoma area codes: 405/572, 580, 918/539
