= Valdez, Colorado =

Unincorporated community in Colorado, US

- Census-designated place
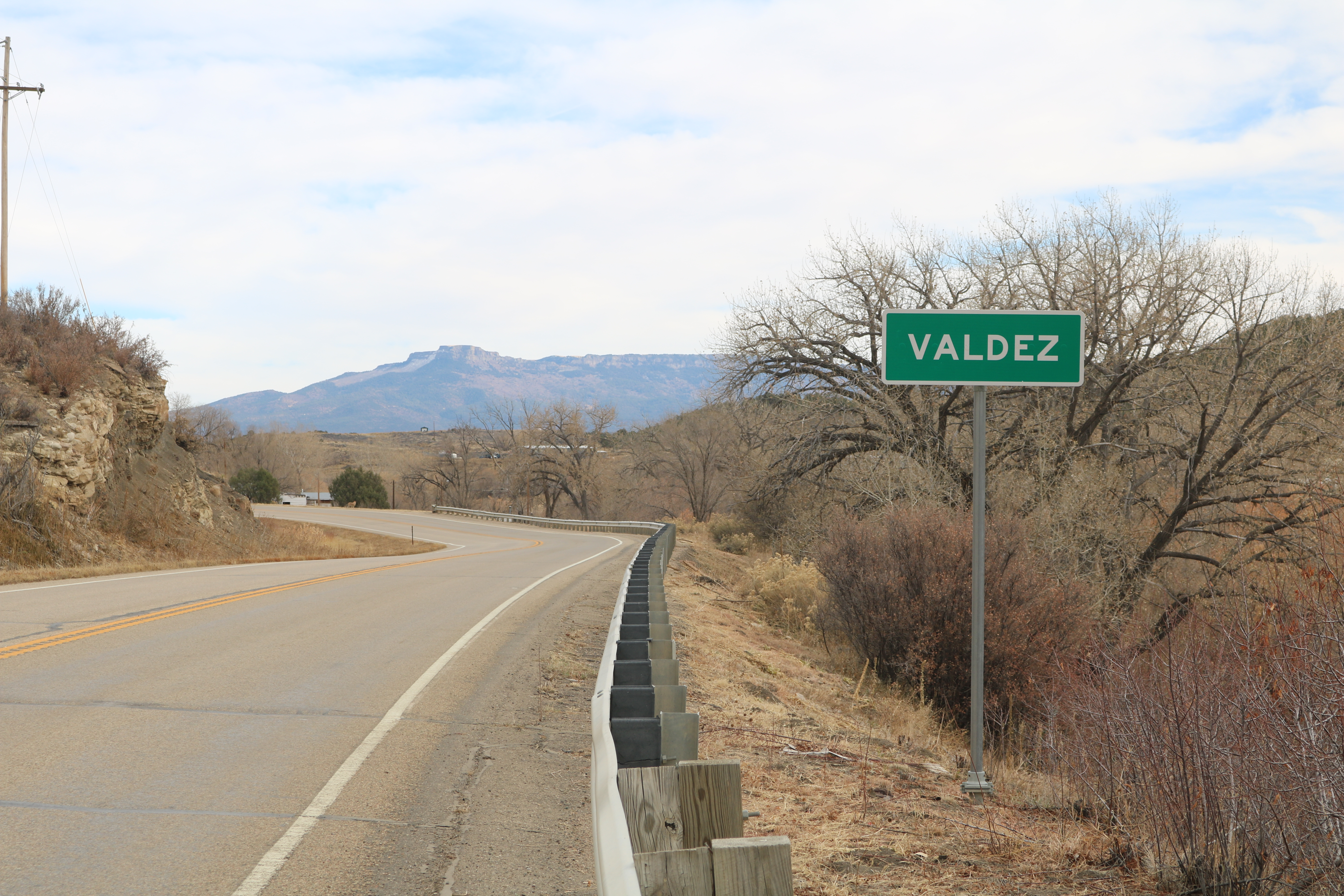
- Entering Valdez from the east on Colorado State Highway 12

- Location of the Valdez CDP in Las Animas County, Colorado
- Coordinates: 37°07′27″N 104°41′12″W
- Country: United States
- State: Colorado
- County: Las Animas County

Government
  - Type: Unincorporated community

Area
  - Total: 1.609 sq mi (4.166 km^{2})
  - Land: 1.609 sq mi (4.166 km^{2})
  - Water: 0 sq mi (0.000 km^{2})
- Elevation: 6,500 ft (2,000 m)

Population (2020)
  - Total: 46
  - Density: 29/sq mi (11/km^{2})
- Time zone: UTC−7 (MST)
  - Summer (DST): UTC−6 (MDT)
- ZIP Code: Trinidad 81082
- Area code: 719
- GNIS feature ID: 2583310

Valdez is an unincorporated community and a census-designated place (CDP) in Las Animas County, Colorado, United States. From 1907 to 1960, Valdez served as a company town for Colorado Fuel & Iron and its Frederick coal mine, the company's most productive and second largest. The population of the Valdez CDP was 46 at the United States Census 2020. The Trinidad post office (ZIP Code 81082) serves the area.

== Geography ==
Valdez is in western Las Animas County, in the valley of the Purgatoire River. It is bordered to the west by Segundo. Colorado State Highway 12 runs along the northern edge of the community, leading east (downriver) 13 miles (21 km) to Trinidad, the county seat, and west (upriver) 20 miles (32 km) to Stonewall Gap.

The Valdez CDP has an area of 1,029 acres (4.166 km^{2}), all land.

== History ==
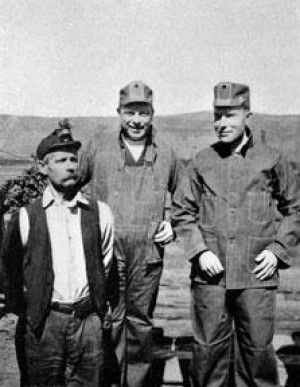
Rockefeller Jr. (right) and Mackenzie King (center) with a miner at the Frederick Mine during their 1915 tour of CF&I holdings.

Colorado Fuel & Iron, under the guidance of first John D. Rockefeller and then his son John D. Rockefeller Jr., greatly expanded in the southern Colorado coalfields in the decade following their 1903 investment in the company. Among these expansions was the construction of the Valdez mine in 1907. Soon after its creation, the mine was renamed to "Frederick" and rapidly expanded, producing bituminous coal sent to the coking ovens at Segundo. Frederick coal was also, from 1918 onwards, shipped towards the CF&I Minnequa steel mill along the Colorado and Wyoming Railway, part of the company's vertical integration strategy. During this early period, Apache Indians reportedly frequented the town and surrounding area.

In 1913-14, CF&I–supported by the Colorado National Guard and Baldwin–Felts detectives–fought the Colorado Coalfield War against striking United Mine Workers of America miners. While Valdez had been one of company towns not to see significant participation in the strike, the violence of the Ludlow Massacre and the succeeding days forced Rockefeller, Jr. to improve CF&Is image. He hired public relations specialist Ivy Lee and future Canadian prime minister William Lyon Mackenzie King for this task and would visit Valdez in September 1915 as part of a general tour of the coal mining region. Out of these efforts, the "Rockefeller Plan" of company town improvement and company-led unionization was born.

By 1917, the mine was producing roughly 1,500 tons of coal a day with the work of 500 men and 28 mules. Trams replaced the mules in 1940 and total miners swelled to 750 men. The total production of the mine before its closure in 1960 was over 29.6 million tons.

== Demographics ==
The United States Census Bureau initially defined the Valdez CDP for the United States Census 2010.

Valdez CDP, Colorado
Year	Pop.	±%
2010	47	—
2020	46	−2.1%
Source: United States Census Bureau

== See also ==
- Las Animas County, Colorado
