= Cuchara =

Cuchara or cucharas may refer to:

== Places ==
- Cuchara, Colorado, US, an unincorporated community
- Cuchara Formation, a geologic formation in Colorado, US
- Cucharas Pass, a mountain pass in the Sangre de Cristo Mountains, Colorado, US
- Cucharas River, a tributary of the Huerfano River in Colorado, US
- Reserva Natural Punta Cucharas, a nature reserve in Barrio Canas, Ponce, Puerto Rico
- Cucharas, Veracruz, a settlement in Ozuluama de Mascareñas, Mexico

== Other uses ==
- Cuchara Valley, a former Colorado ski resort
- "Cuchara", a song by Dino Saluzzi from the 2001 album Responsorium
- John Henry Lloyd a.k.a. "El Cuchara" (1884-1964), U.S. baseball shortstop and manager

== See also ==
- Spoon (disambiguation), "cuchara" is Spanish for 'spoon'
