= Our Lady of Guadalupe Church and Medina Cemetery =

Historic place in Colorado, US

- Kim Schools
- U.S. National Register of Historic Places
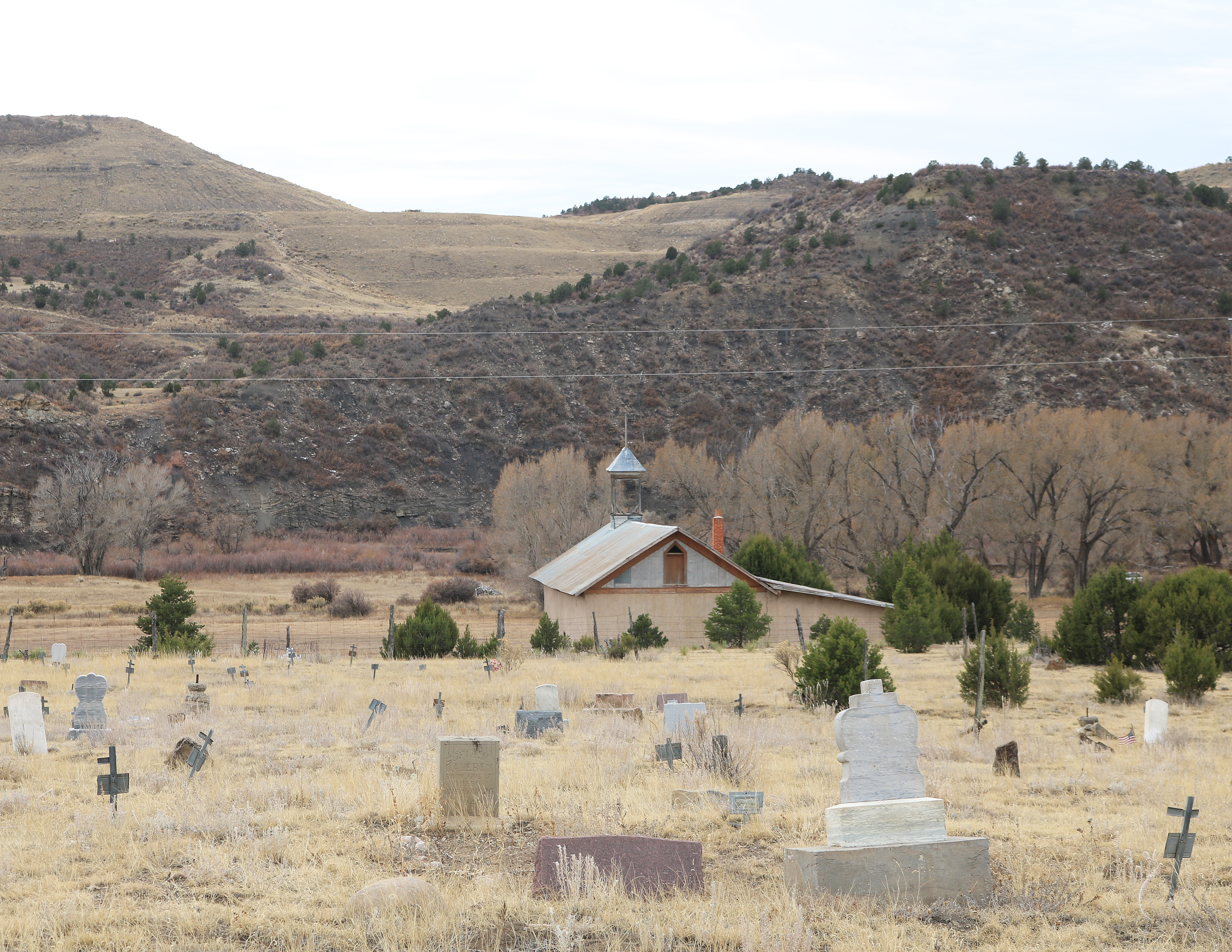
- The property in 2019

- Location within Colorado
- Location: CO Hwy. 12, Medina Plaza, Colorado
- Coordinates: 37.129112°N 104.799595°W
- Built: 1866 or 1867
- NRHP reference No.: 100004628
- Added to NRHP: November 15, 2019

The Our Lady of Guadalupe Church and Medina Cemetery in Las Animas County, Colorado, at Medina Plaza, was listed on the National Register of Historic Places in 2019.

The church dates from 1866 or 1867 and may be known more commonly as Nuestra Señora de Guadalupe.

It was documented by the Historic American Buildings Survey as "Guadaloupe Mission Church", with photos taken in 1936 by photographer Frederick D. Nichols. It is recorded as "built 1867" and "adobe with cupola".

It is located about 3 miles (4.8 km) east of the unincorporated community of Weston, Colorado. Satellite view shows what appears to be a cemetery across the road and up the hill a bit, not visible by Google Streetview.
