= Stonewall Gap, Colorado =

Census-designated place in Las Animas County, CO, USA

- Census-designated place
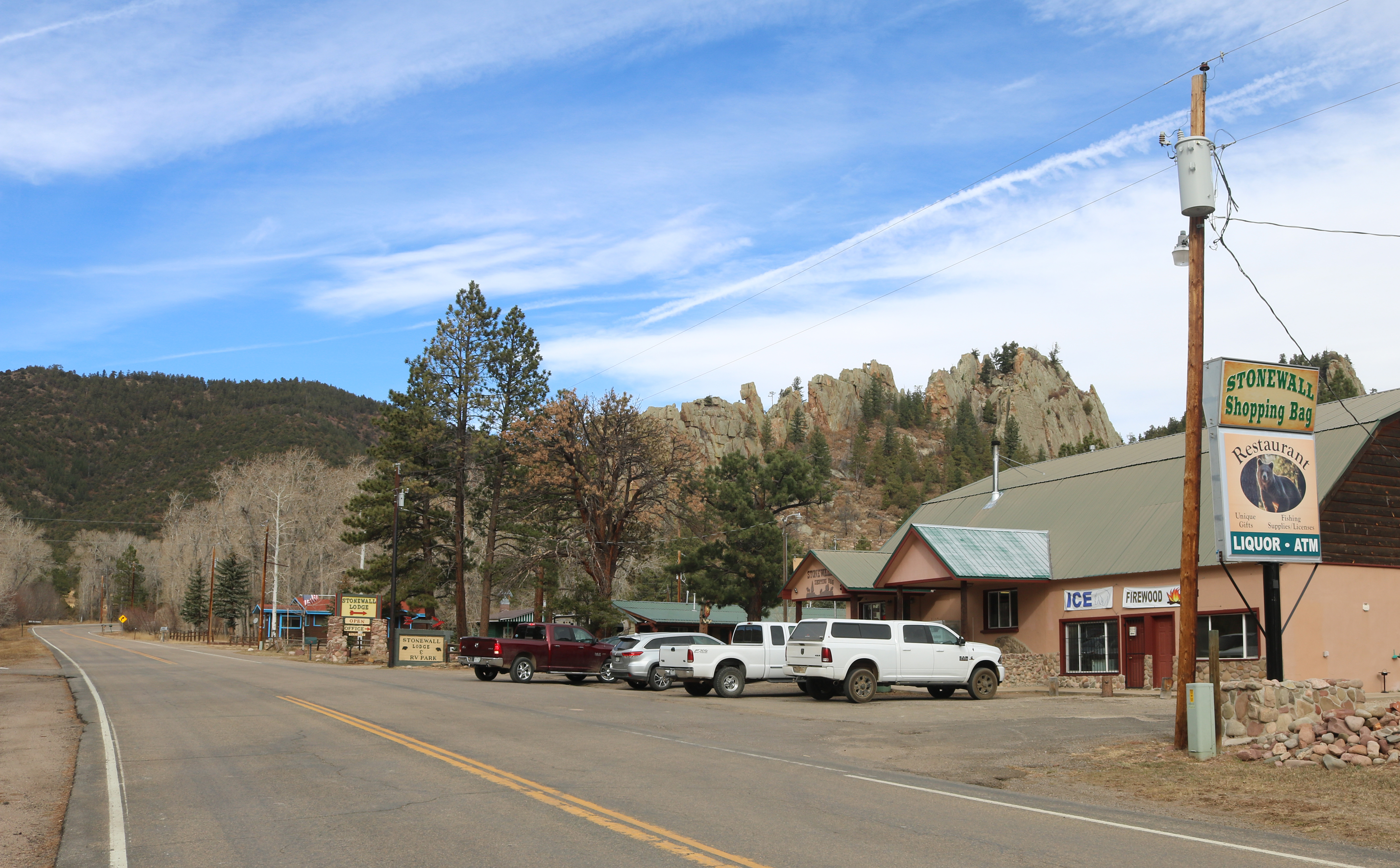
- Stonewall Gap and Colorado State Highway 12.

- Location of the Stonewall Gap CDP in Las Animas County, Colorado
- Coordinates: 37°09′38″N 105°02′03″W
- Country: United States
- State: Colorado
- County: Las Animas County

Government
  - Type: Unincorporated community

Area
  - Total: 1.920 sq mi (4.974 km^{2})
  - Land: 1.920 sq mi (4.974 km^{2})
  - Water: 0 sq mi (0.000 km^{2})
- Elevation: 7,976 ft (2,431 m)

Population (2020)
  - Total: 66
  - Density: 34/sq mi (13/km^{2})
- Time zone: UTC-7 (MST)
  - Summer (DST): UTC-6 (MDT)
- ZIP Code: Weston 81091
- Area code: 719
- GNIS feature ID: 2583300

Stonewall Gap (also known as Stonewall) is an unincorporated community and a census-designated place (CDP) located in and governed by Las Animas County, Colorado, United States. The population of the Stonewall Gap CDP was 66 at the United States Census 2020. The Weston post office (Zip Code 81091) serves the area.

== Geography ==
Stonewall Gap lies along Colorado State Highway 12 at a gap formed by the Middle Fork of the Purgatoire River through the 8,400 feet (2,600 meters) elevation Stonewall Ridge. Highway 12 leads east down the Purgatoire River valley 33 miles (53 km) to Trinidad, the Las Animas county seat, and north over Cucharas Pass in the Sangre de Cristo Mountains 32 miles (51 km) to La Veta.

The Stonewall Gap CDP has an area of 1,229 acres (4.974 km^{2}), all land.

== History ==
The Stonewall area was originally part of the 1,714,765 acres (6,939.41 km^{2}) Maxwell Land Grant awarded by the government of New Mexico to two Mexican citizens in 1841. The grant area was later owned by foreign investors who created the Maxwell Land Grant Company and attempted to expel the farmers, ranchers, and miners, both Anglos and Hispanics, who had settled on lands in the grant. The Stonewall incident in 1888 was the most violent of many incidents in the dispute between the Maxwell Company and the settlers on grant lands. The company had sold 5,000 acres (2,000 ha) of grant land in Colorado to a group of investors including Colorado governor, Alva Adams. The investors intended to develop the land for tourism and sought the immediate eviction of the settlers. A large group of settlers, mostly Hispanics, gathered to protest and surrounded a hotel in Stonewall where the company's employees barricaded themselves. A gunfight ensued in which three of the protesters were shot and killed. In the aftermath several of the protesters were arrested and later convicted of inciting a riot.

The Supreme Court of the United States affirmed the ownership of the grant land by the foreign investors and by 1899 most of the original settlers had either been evicted or had come to terms with the company.

== Demographics ==
The United States Census Bureau initially defined the Stonewall Gap CDP for the United States Census 2010. The population was 67 in 2010 and 66 in 2020.

== See also ==
- Las Animas County, Colorado
