= Purgatoire River track site =

Dinosaur track site in Colorado, USA

Coordinates: 37°37′01″N 103°35′53″W

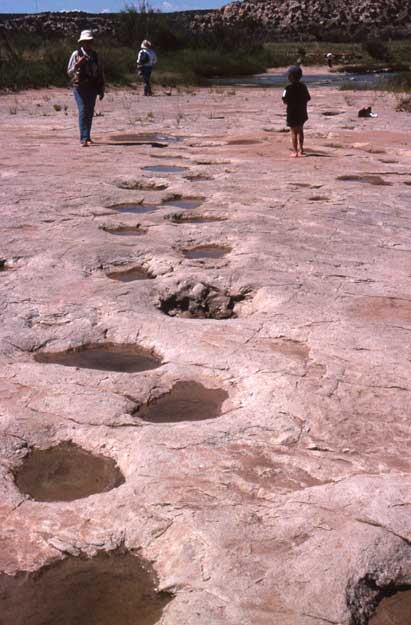
One of the dinosaur trackways at the Purgatoire River track site.

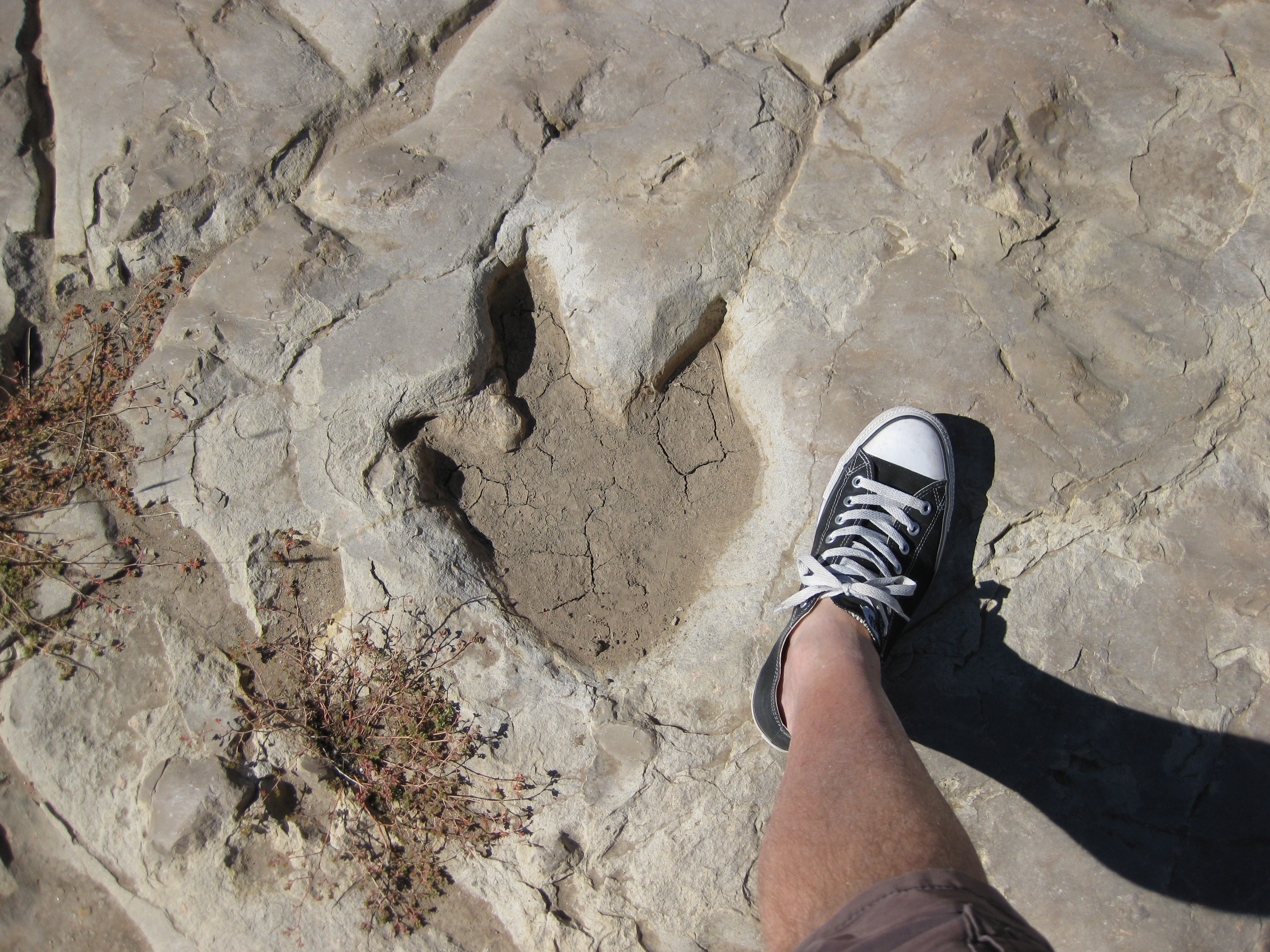
Theropod footprint at the Purgatoire River dinosaur track site, Picket Wire Canyonlands, Colorado, U.S.A.

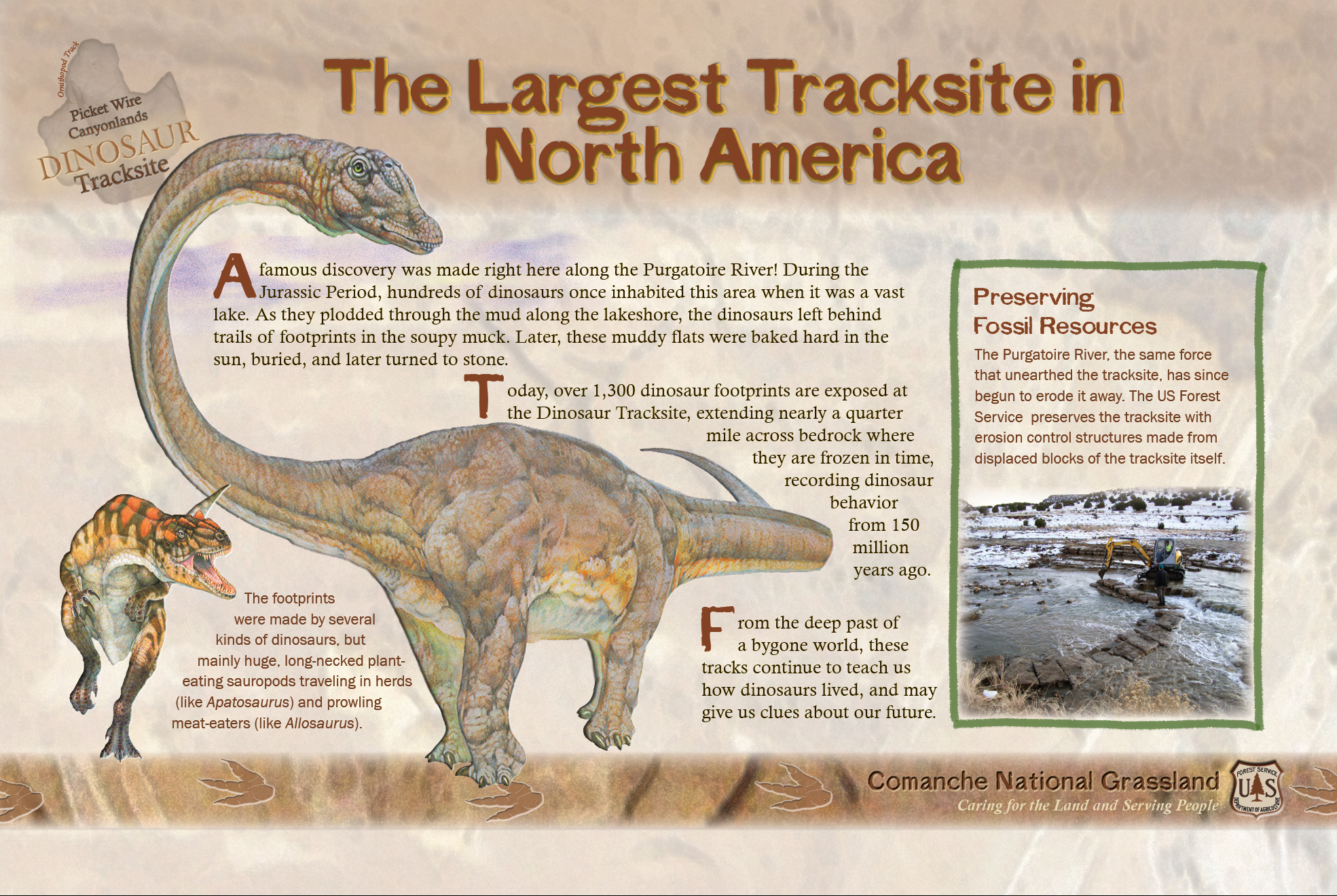
Interp Panel 1

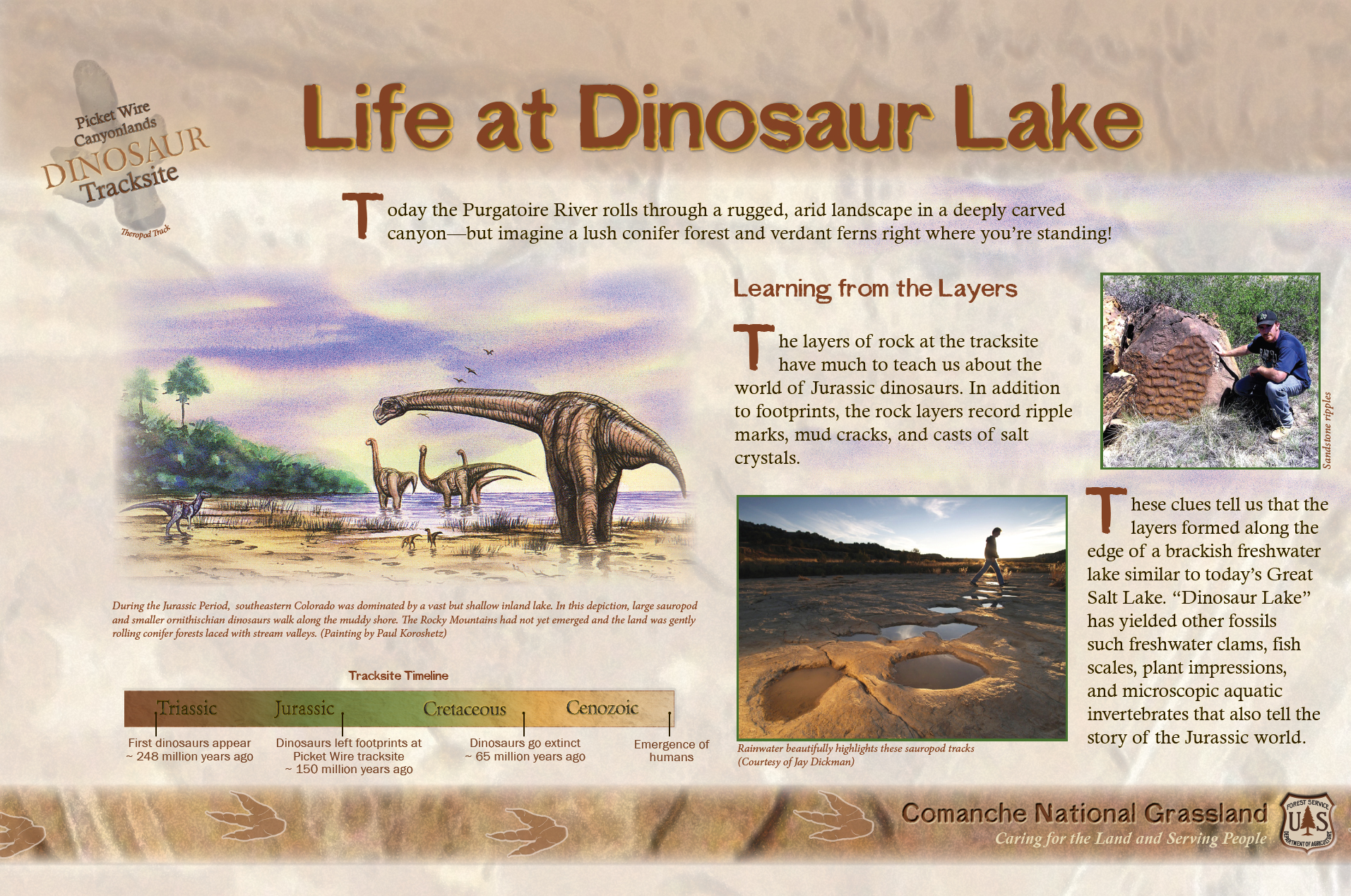
Interp Panel 2

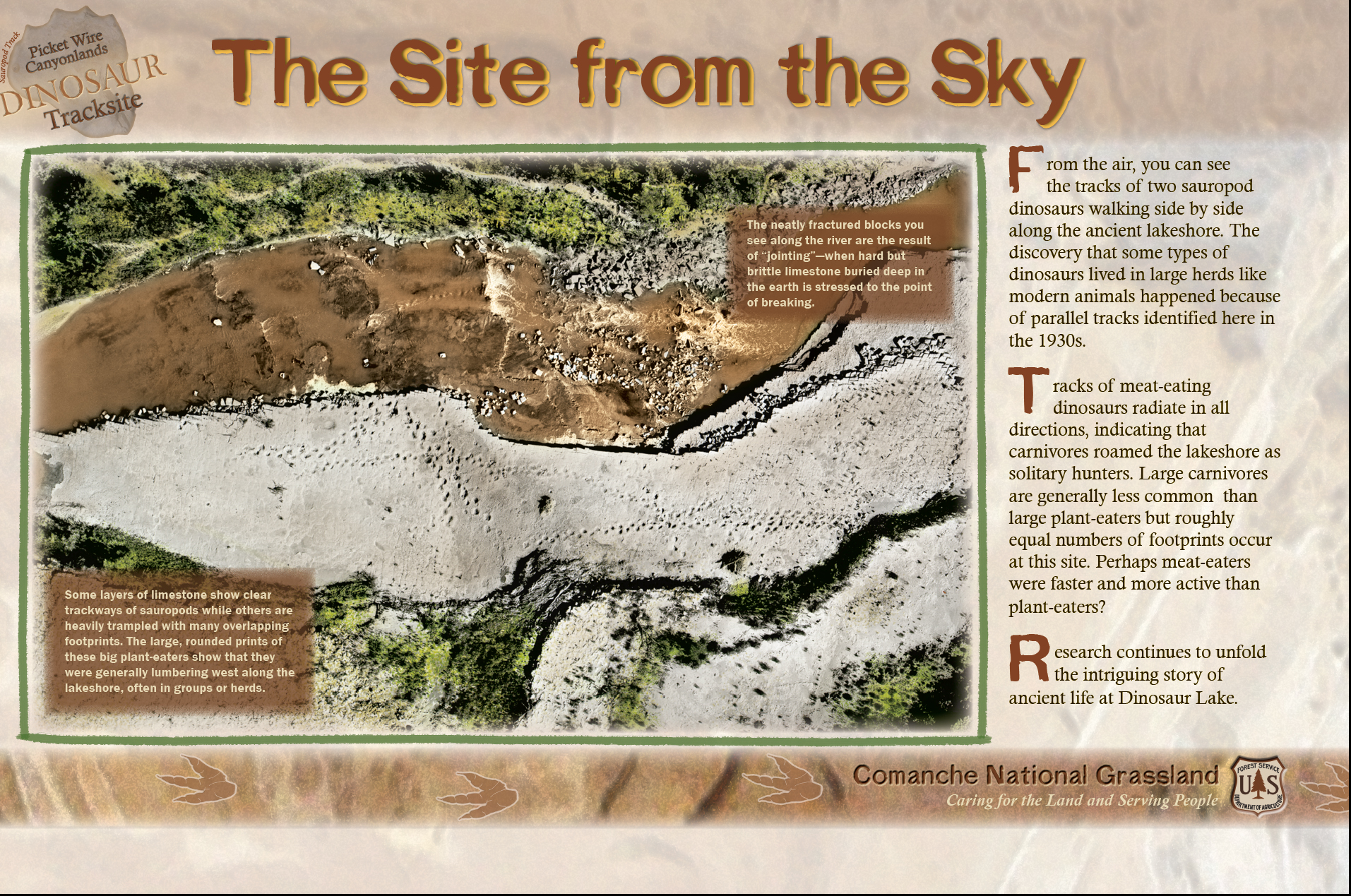
Interp Panel 3

The Purgatoire River track site, also called the Picketwire Canyonlands tracksite, is one of the largest dinosaur tracksites in North America. The site is located on public land of the Comanche National Grassland, along the Purgatoire ("Picketwire") River south of La Junta in Otero County, Colorado.

In 2014 researchers published information about the discovery of a new area containing 90 trackways. These paralleled existing trackways of sauropods. This observation confirmed the major finding of these studies, that the sauropods displayed gregarious behavior.

The tracksite is far from paved roads, but accessible to the public by hiking on foot, by mountain bike, or by horseback. Motorized vehicle access is restricted to tours conducted by the US Forest Service.

In 2001, the first discoveries in the Picketwire Canyonlands area were made of related fossil dinosaur bones. Fieldwork has continued each year on recovery of the massive bones of a sauropod (brontosaur) skeleton. The project has been supported by volunteers and the Sternberg Museum of Natural History of western Kansas. Continued exploration of fossils in the canyonlands has revealed tetrapods. This finding had major implications for understanding of geology in the area. As a result, researchers in 2012 proposed a "major revision of lower Mesozoic stratigraphy in the Picket Wire Canyonlands" and a "critical reappraisal of understanding of the correlation of Triassic strata from Wyoming, through and under the Denver Basin, to the High Plains of Oklahoma and New Mexico."

== Geology ==
The more than 100 trackways, made up of more than 1500 individual footprints, were made by both biped and quadruped dinosaurs. The tracks occur in limestone of the Jurassic Morrison Formation. The site formed along the shore of a large freshwater lake at the time the tracks were made. A previously unmapped region was discovered in 2012, where removal of alluvium revealed 90 new trackways, showing parallel prints.
