= Segundo, Colorado =

Census-designated place in Las Animas County, CO, USA

- Census-designated place
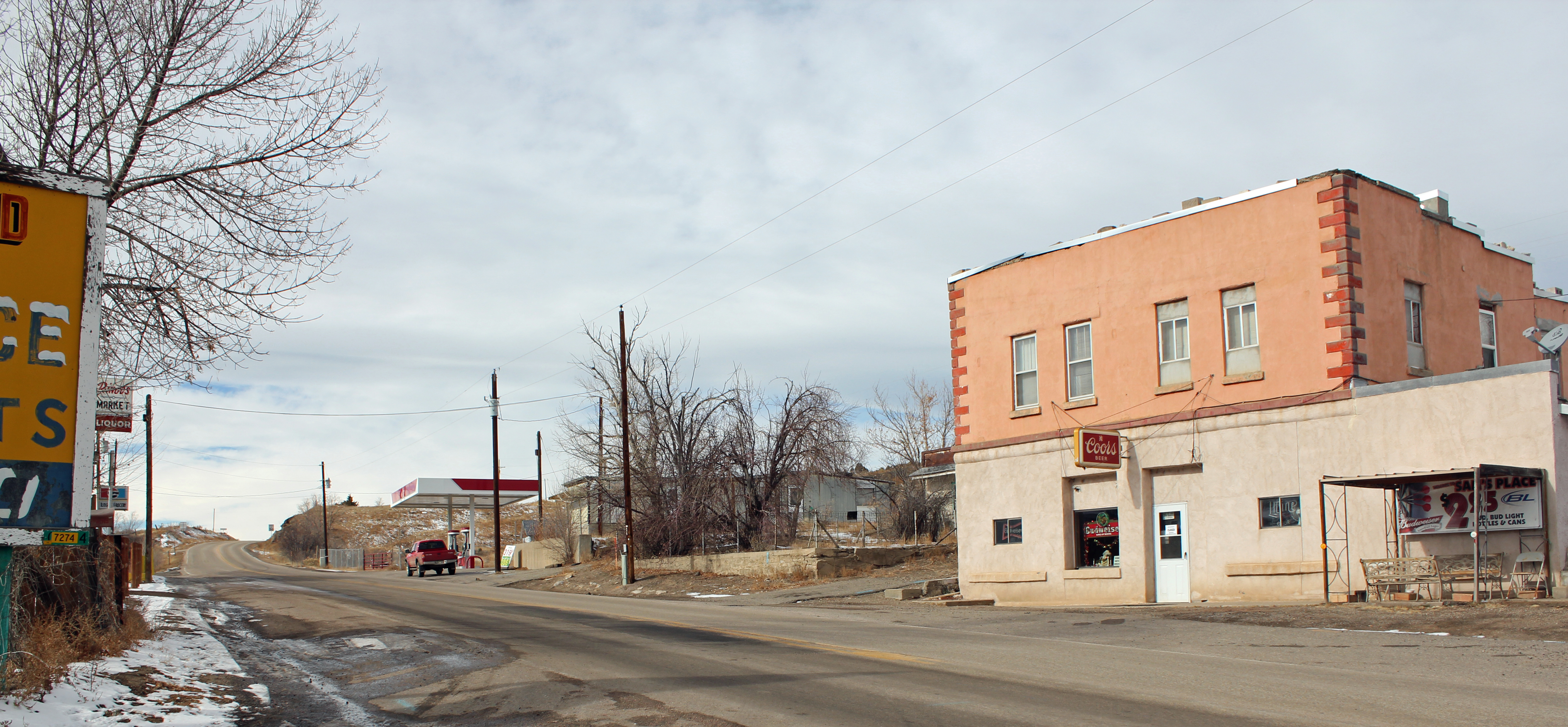
- Colorado State Highway 12 as it passes through Segundo.

- Location of the Segundo CDP in Las Animas County, Colorado
- Coordinates: 37°07′26″N 104°44′26″W
- Country: United States
- State: Colorado
- County: Las Animas
- Founded: 1904

Government
  - Type: Unincorporated community

Area
  - Total: 0.694 sq mi (1.797 km^{2})
  - Land: 0.694 sq mi (1.797 km^{2})
  - Water: 0 sq mi (0.000 km^{2})
- Elevation: 6,605 ft (2,013 m)

Population (2020)
  - Total: 100
  - Density: 140/sq mi (56/km^{2})
- Time zone: UTC-7 (MST)
  - Summer (DST): UTC-6 (MDT)
- ZIP Code: Trinidad 81082
- Area code: 719
- GNIS feature ID: 2583292

Segundo is an unincorporated community and a census-designated place (CDP) located in and governed by Las Animas County, Colorado, United States. The population of the Segundo CDP was 100 at the United States Census 2020. The Trinidad post office (Zip Code 81082) serves the area.

== History ==
Segundo was founded by Colorado Fuel and Iron (CF&I) as a company town to house its workers for a local coal mine. The town was the second mining community developed by CF&I in 1904 behind Primero and was referenced in the town's name, with segundo meaning "second" in Spanish. CF&I offered adequate housing for the time, and promoted upward mobility through its sponsorship of a YMCA center, an elementary school, small businesses, and a company store. Segundo was a prosperous town until the 1920s, when the population began to decline due to constant health issues related to air pollution and outdated housing that lacked indoor plumbing. Declines in demand for metallurgical coke led to workers being laid off and, following a major fire in 1929, CF&I ceased their operations in Segundo. The town's population plummeted to the point that it almost became a ghost town.

== Geography ==
Segundo is located 14 miles (23 km) west of Trinidad along Colorado State Highway 12 in the valley of the Purgatoire River.

The Segundo CDP has an area of 444 acres (1.797 km^{2}), all land.

== Demographics ==
The United States Census Bureau initially defined the Segundo CDP for the United States Census 2010.

Segundo CDP, Colorado
Year	Pop.	±%
2010	98	—
2020	100	+2.0%
Source: United States Census Bureau

== See also ==
- Las Animas County, Colorado
