= Cuchara, Colorado =

Census Designated Place in Colorado, US

Cuchara
- Census Designated Place
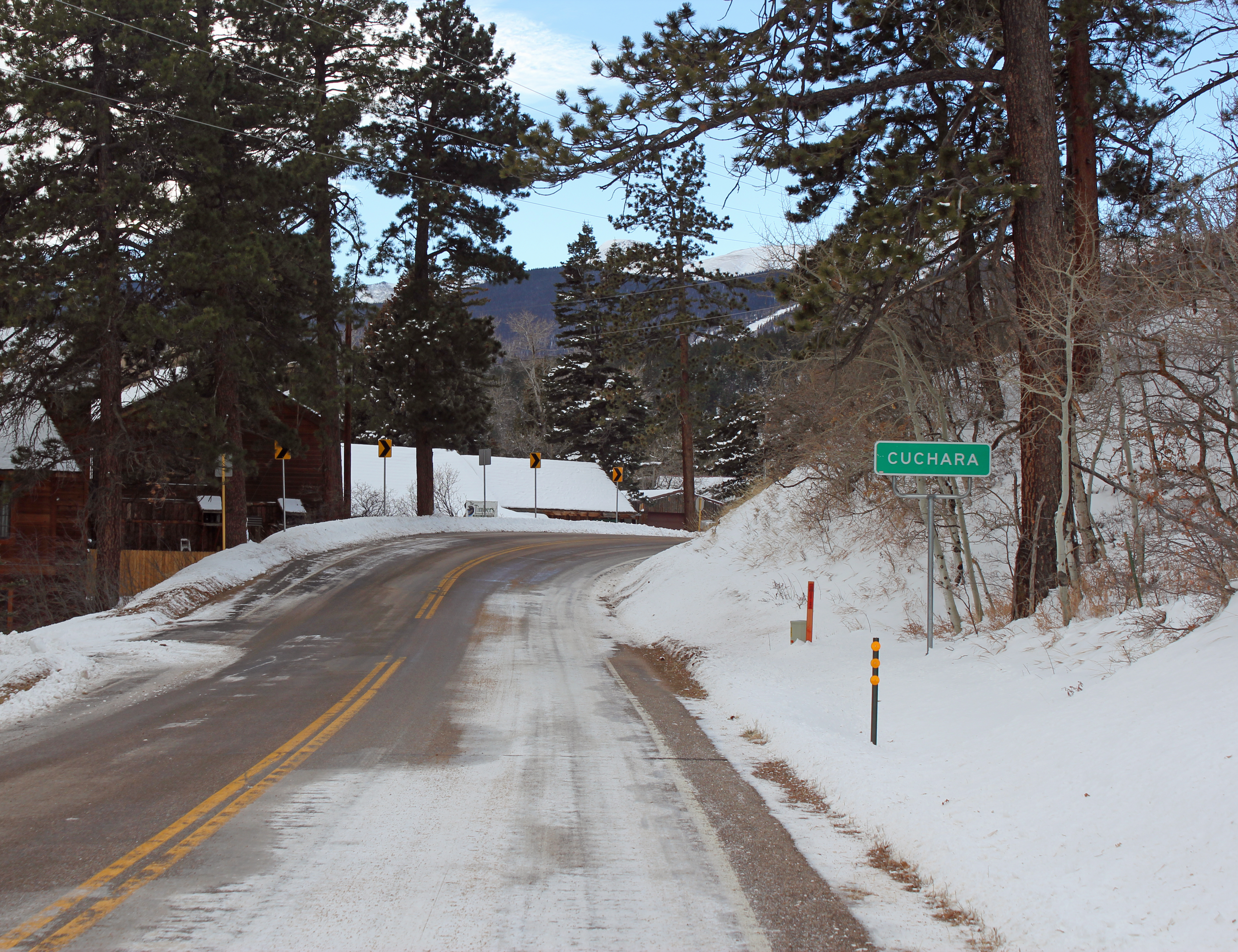
- Entering Cuchara from the north on State Highway 12.

- Location of Cuchara, Colorado. Cuchara (Colorado)
- Coordinates: 37°22′43″N 105°06′07″W
- Country: United States
- State: Colorado
- County: Huerfano

Government
  - Type: Unincorporated community
  - Body: Huerfano County
- Elevation: 8,468 ft (2,581 m)
- Time zone: UTC−07:00 (MST)
  - Summer (DST): UTC−06:00 (MDT)
- ZIP code: La Veta 81055
- Area code: 719
- GNIS place ID: 203635

Cuchara is an unincorporated community and a census-designated place (CDP) located in Huerfano County, Colorado, United States. It is located south of the town of La Veta. State Highway 12 travels through Cuchara as it approaches Trinidad to the southeast.

== History ==
The Cuchara Camps, Colorado, post office operated from January 20, 1916, until June 15, 1957, when the name was shortened to Cuchara. The Chucara, Colorado, post office closed on June 30, 1959. The La Veta, Colorado, post office (ZIP code 81055) now serves the area.

In the summer of 2018, Cuchara was evacuated due to a wildfire that threatened the town in the middle of their peak season. The evacuation caused local businesses to suffer financially.

== Description ==
Cuchara is situated on the eastern slopes of the Sangre de Cristo Mountains in south-central Colorado. It is west of the Spanish Peaks. Cucharas Pass, at almost 10,000 feet, is a few miles south of the town of Cuchara. The Cucharas River flows on the outskirts of town. The San Isabel National Forest surrounds the town. Cuchara is located along the Highway of Legends National Scenic Byway, an 82‑mile route designated as a National Scenic Byway in 2021.

In Spanish, "cuchara" means "spoon," reflecting the area's valley being so shaped. A large number of locations are listed as having the name of "Cuchara" or some derivation there of in Huerfano County, including Cuchara Junction northeast of Walsenburg and the Cuchara Formation.

This small town has a few small businesses including restaurants, bars, local merchandise shops, small hotels, lodges, B&Bs, horseback riding and fishing outfits, and a community church. This is a stopping point along the scenic State Highway 12.

== Cuchara Mountain Park ==
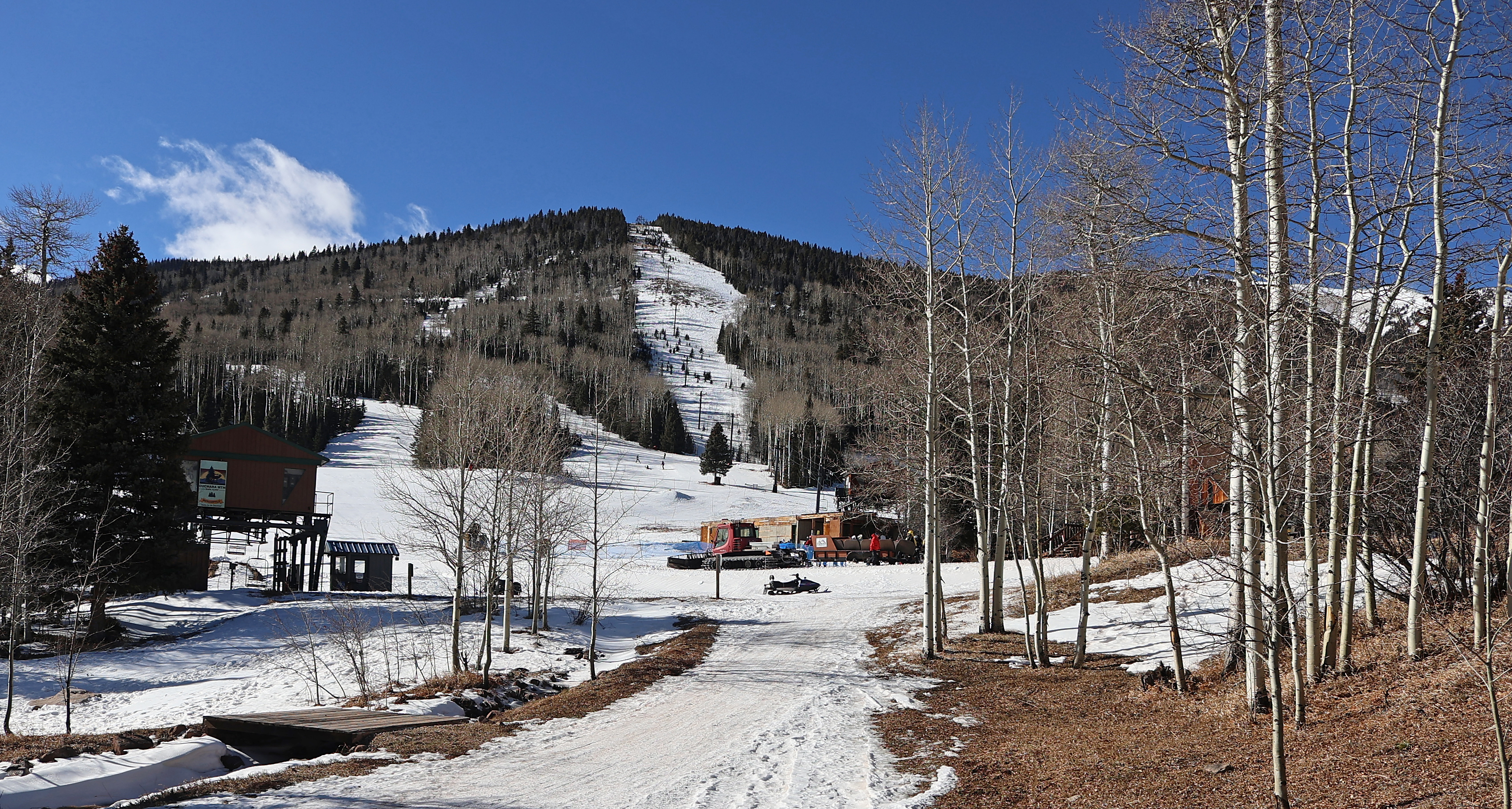
Cuchara Mountain Park (2024)

Cuchara is the site of the Cuchara Mountain Park, a year-round high-country park that offers traditional skiing and snowboarding, XC skiing, snowshoeing, hiking, disc golf, a bike playground, sledding, and mini golf. The park occupies part of the former Cuchara Ski Resort, which closed in 2000 and reopened on January 16, 2026. Now operated by the non-profit Panadero Ski Corporation, the park has one double chair lift in operation, servicing 7 beginner and intermediate runs, plus a terrain park. The ski area has a ski and snowboard equipment rental shop.

Cuchara Mountain Park
- Interactive map of Cuchara Mountain Park
- Location: Panadero Ski Corporation, 73 Cuchara Ave E, Cuchara, Colorado, United States
- Nearest city: La Veta, Colorado
- Coordinates: 37.35490°N 105.10072°W
- Vertical: 340'
- Top elevation: 9589'
- Base elevation: 9249'
- Skiable area: 47 acres (19 ha)
- Lift system: 1 surface lift (operational); additional lifts non-operational
- Terrain parks: Yes
- Snowfall: 250" annually
- Snowmaking: Yes
- Website: https://cucharamountainpark.org

== See also ==
- List of populated places in Colorado
- List of post offices in Colorado
