= Comanche National Grassland =

Protected area in southeast Colorado

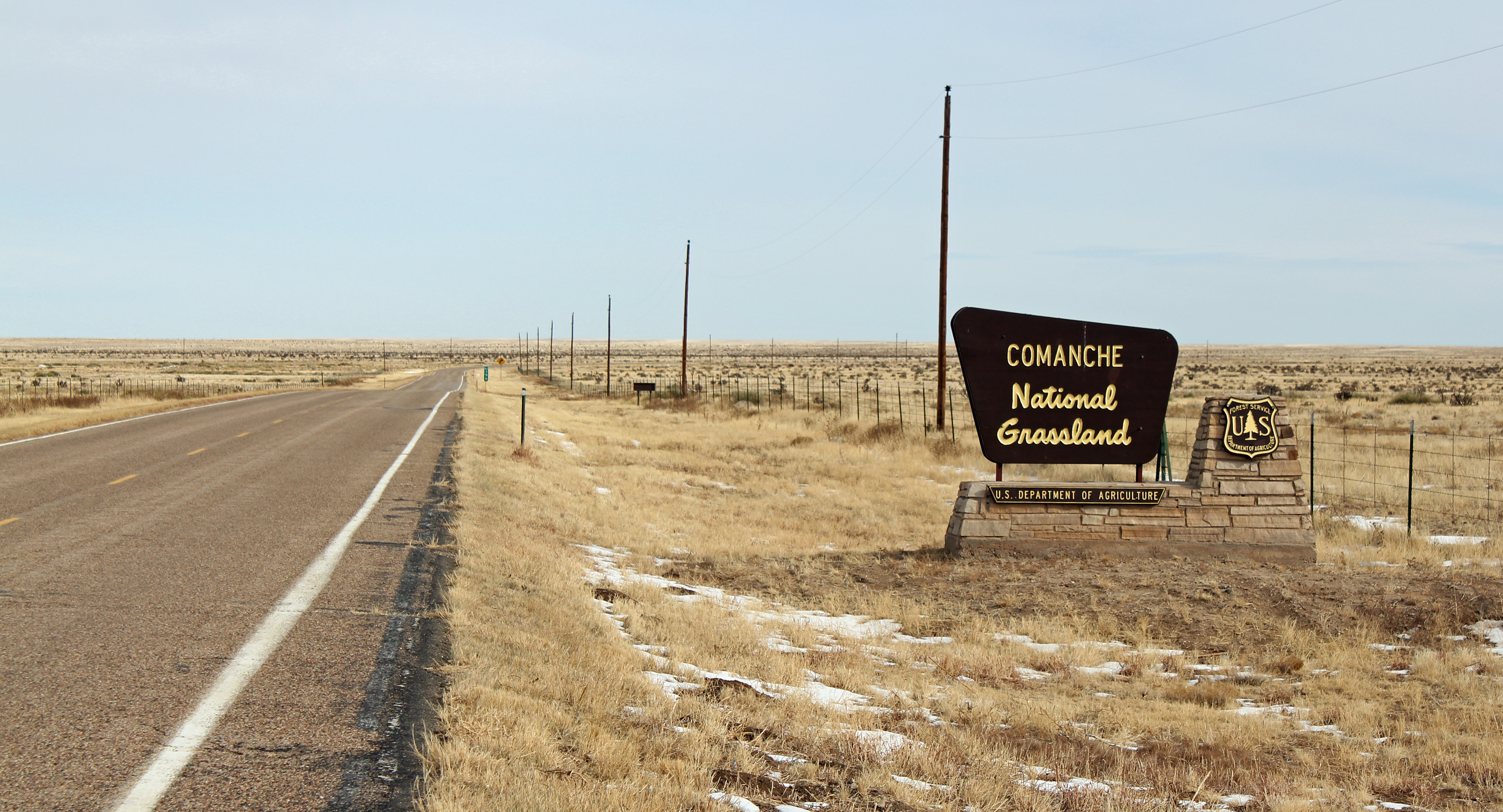
- Entering the grassland along Highway 160.

- Location within Colorado Location within the United States
- Location: Baca, Otero, and Las Animas counties, Colorado, USA
- Nearest city: La Junta, CO
- Coordinates: 37°20′12″N 103°4′07″W
- Area: 443,081 acres (1,793.09 km^{2})
- Established: June 23, 1960
- Governing body: U.S. Forest Service
- Website: Comanche National Grassland

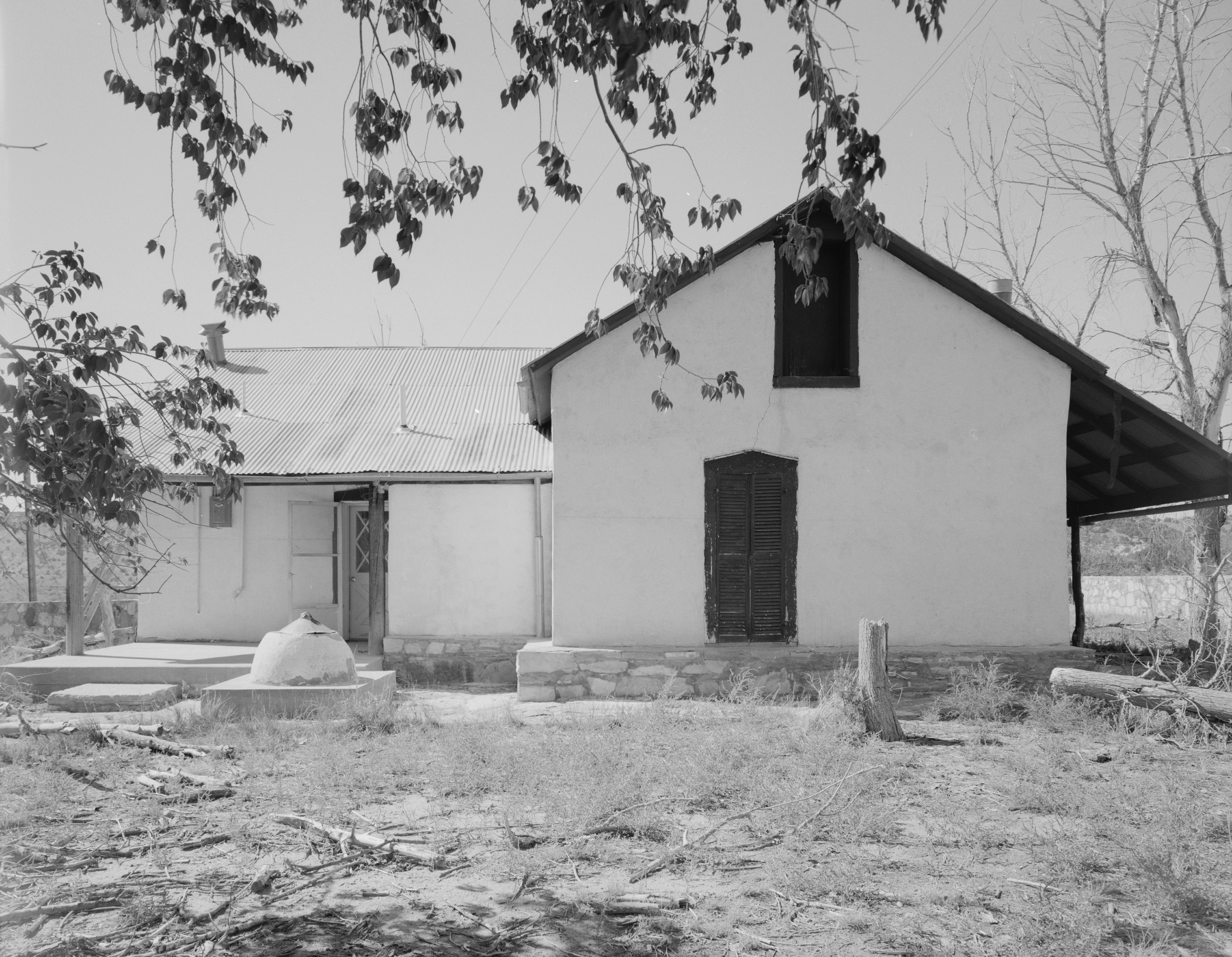
Rourke Ranch Historic District, located on the Comanche National Grassland near La Junta

Comanche National Grassland is a National Grassland located in southeastern Colorado, United States. It is the sister grassland of Cimarron National Grassland and contains both prairie grasslands and canyons. It is separated into two sections, each operated by a local ranger district, one of which is in Springfield and the other of which is in La Junta. The grassland is administered by the Forest Service together with the Pike and San Isabel National Forests, and the Cimarron National Grassland, from common headquarters located in Pueblo, Colorado.

== Geography ==
Comanche National Grassland consists of 463,373 acres (187,520 ha) in two units: (1) Timpas, south of La Junta, and (2) Carrizo, south of Springfield. Both units have privately owned tracts of ranchland mixed in with the government-owned land.

Most of the Carrizo Unit is in the watershed of Carrizo Creek, a tributary of the Cimarron River. The Timpas Unit is in the watershed of the Purgatoire River, also called the Purgatory and Picketwire River.

Elevations on the grassland range from 3,900 feet (1,190 m) in the southeastern corner of the Carrizo Unit on the Oklahoma border to 6,200 feet (1,890 m) on Fallas Mesa in the northwestern part of the same unit. Average annual precipitation on the grassland ranges from 12 inches (300 mm) at La Junta to 17 inches (430 mm) at Springfield. Summer temperatures are hot with the average high above 90 °F (32 °C); winters are cold with average low temperatures in January below 20 °F (−7 °C).

== Flora and fauna ==
Vegetation is mostly steppe and shortgrass prairie, although pinyon and juniper trees are found in rocky canyons and cottonwoods and willows grow near streams. Western soapberry and netleaf hackberry are common in some areas near canyon bottoms, as well as some larger Gambel oak. Chickasaw plum and fragrant mimosa are occasional on uplands within grass cover. A few ponderosa pines are found on cool, moist hillsides.

Wildlife on the grassland includes pronghorn, prairie dogs, lesser prairie chickens, mule deer, elk, wild turkey, golden eagle, swift fox, and infrequent roadrunners. Three hundred and twenty-eight species of birds, including many Eastern birds at the limit of their range, have been recorded in Baca County where most of the Carrizo unit is located.

Beginning around the start of September, male tarantulas in the park will leave their burrows to search for females, which are in their own holes. Tarantulas are often seen crossing the road because they are easy to catch sight of on the pavement.

== History ==
The marks of ancient American Indians are found in the Grassland in petroglyphs on many of the rocks and cliff faces in the canyons. Some of the rock art may be as old as 8,000 years and some are so new that they depict horses which arrived in the Southwest with the Spanish in the 16th century. The early Indians lived in rock shelters, some of which have been found in the Grassland, and practiced a hunting and gathering culture. Around 1000 AD, a people called the Apishipa began farming in the region, however their efforts were unsuccessful. Apache inhabited this area when the Spaniards arrived. They were pushed southward by the Comanche in the 18th century. Tipi rings – stones holding down the edges of circular tipis – are common.

A branch of the Santa Fe Trail ran through the Timpas unit and from the 1820s onward wagon trains from Missouri and Kansas loaded with goods for New Mexico followed the trail. Among the first non-Indian settlers on the Grassland was a group of eleven New Mexican families who settled along the Purgatory River in 1871. In the same year, Eugene and Mary Rourke established a ranch nearby. Homesteaders soon followed the ranchers and much of the grassland was devoted to growing Broomcorn. The Dust Bowl of the 1930s defeated the farmers and the Federal government bought the land comprising the present National Grassland from its bankrupt owners. Comanche National Grassland was established in 1960. Grazing permits for cattle are issued by the Forest Service to ranchers for most lands belonging to the National Grassland.

An important addition occurred in 1991 when the U.S. Army transferred 16,000 acres (6,500 ha) of land in the Purgatoire River Canyon to the National Grassland. The Army lands were part of the Piñon Canyon Maneuver Site (PCMS), a 238,000-acre (96,000 ha) facility devoted to military exercises. However, In 2007, the Army announced a plan to expand the PCMS by purchasing additional land and seeking to transfer the lands of the Comanche National Grassland to Army ownership. The expansion plan, to be implemented in several phases, would increase the size of the PCMS to several million acres, making it the largest military base in the United States. If implemented, the plan would virtually eliminate private land ownership and ranching in Southeastern Colorado as well as abolish the National Grassland and displace 17,000 people. Local citizens and politicians protested the expansion plan of PCMS. On November 25, 2013, the Army announced that its plan to expand the Piñon Canyon Maneuver site had been cancelled.

== Recreation, Timpas Unit ==
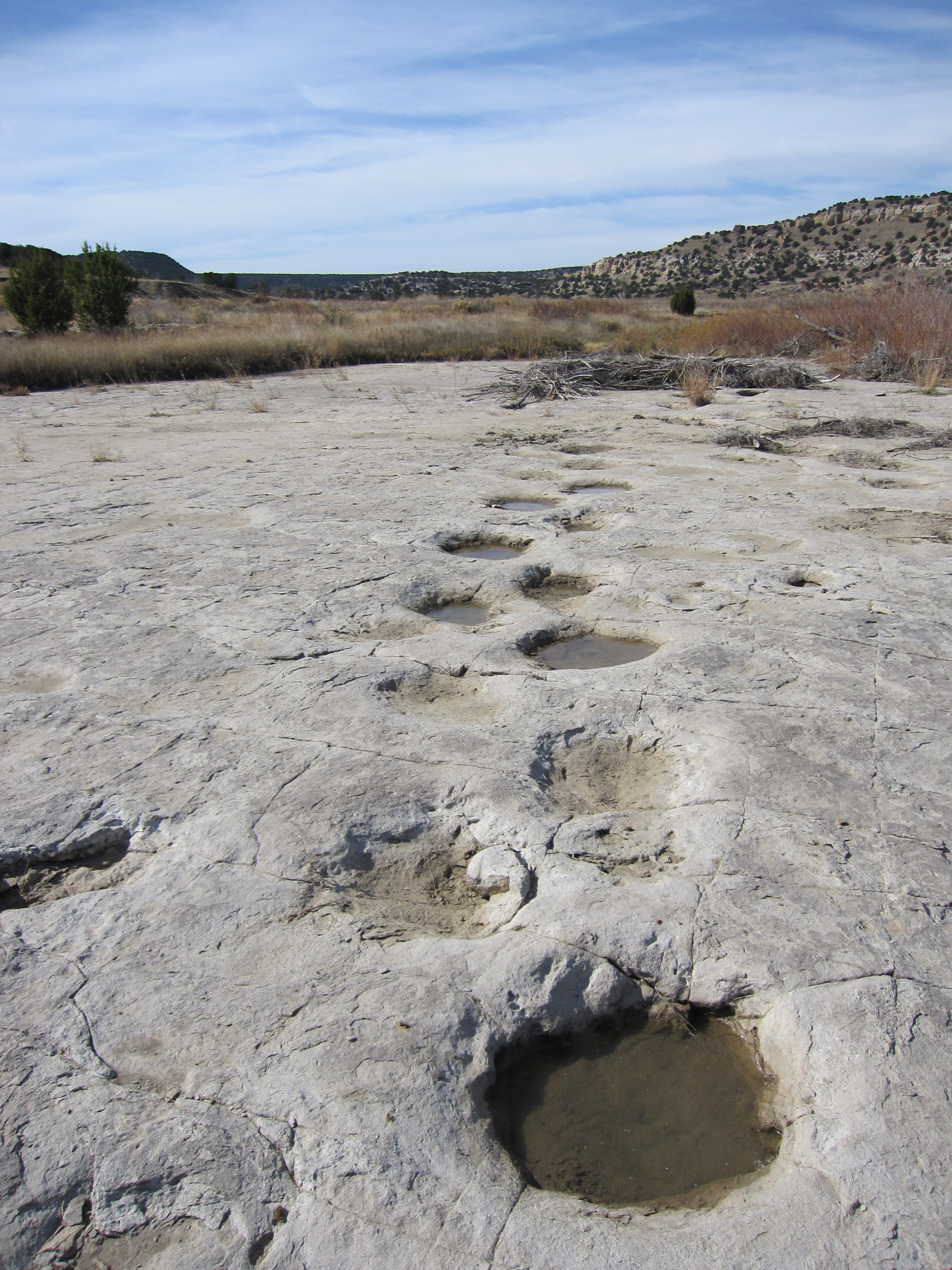
Fossilized brontosaur tracks in Picketwire Canyon.

Picketwire Canyon is about 400 feet (120 m) deep and contains the Purgatoire River track site, one of the largest dinosaur track-ways in the world, in the Morrison Formation. More than 1,300 tracks of Brontosaurs and Allosaurs 150 million years old are preserved in the rocks. The canyon and the dinosaur tracks are accessible by a hiking, biking, and horseback trail that leads 8.7 miles (14.0 km) one-way through the canyon to the Dolores Mission, the ruins of a small 19th century Catholic church, the dinosaur tracks, and the adobe-buildings of the Rourke ranch, which operated between 1871 and 1971 and is preserved as a National Historic Site. The trail is normally closed to motorized vehicles. On weekends in the fall and spring, rangers lead guided tours into the canyon in all-wheel drive vehicles with visitors providing their own vehicles.

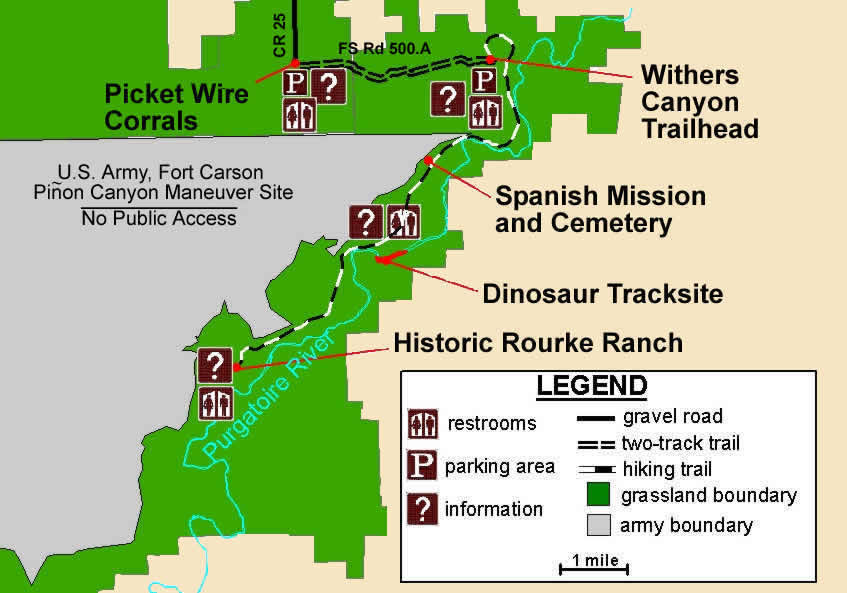
A map of Picketwire Canyon and its trails.

Vogel Canyon. This is a side canyon of the Purgatory River. There is a picnic area and eight miles of easy trails follow the mesa top or lead into the small, scenic canyon which has springs, old ruins, and rock art.

Santa Fe Trail Historic Sites. The Sierra Vista Overlook, Timpas Picnic Area, and Iron Springs preserve a section of the Santa Fe Trail. The overlook has a view of the Rocky Mountains, 75 miles (120 km) away. Stone posts indicate the Santa Fe Trail and can be followed on foot for three miles between Sierra Vista and Timpas Picnic area. A one-half mile nature trail leads to Timpas Creek, one of the few watering holes along this section of the Santa Fe Trail.

== Recreation, Carrizo Unit ==
Picture Canyon. Located just north of the Oklahoma border Picture Canyon was named for its prehistoric rock art. It is a small canyon with easy slopes, large springs, picnic tables, and a loop hiking trail 2.6 miles (4.2 km) long. A six mile round-trip hike can be taken by going west from the parking area into the Nort (or Holt) Canyon. On the western side of Picture Canyon is Crack Cave with walls full of rock art. One group of petroglyphs in the cave is illuminated by sunlight for only ten to twelve minutes at sunrise during the Spring and Autumn equinox. The cave is locked except during the equinoxes when tours are allowed to visit and view the illuminated petroglyphs.

Carrizo Canyon. A well-watered canyon with rock art, picnic tables, a hiking trail, and fishing for Channel Catfish in Carrizo Creek.

Cottonwood Canyon One of the best birding areas in Colorado. A campground on private property is at the entrance to the 5-mile long canyon which is bisected by a road and bordered mostly by private property.

Campo Lek. The only publicly accessible lesser prairie chicken lek (display ground) in Colorado. The lek is often closed due to the decline of the prairie chicken population.

Primitive camping is allowed on all lands of the Comanche National Grassland except for Picketwire Canyon. Hunting is permitted for mule deer, elk, pronghorn, wild turkey, and small game. Colorado state regulations apply.

== Gallery ==
Map of states and counties affected by the Dust Bowl between 1935 and 1938 originally prepared by the Soil Conservation Service. The most severely affected counties are colored .

== See also ==
- List of protected grasslands of North America
