= Piñon Canyon Maneuver Site =

U.S. Army base in Colorado

Coordinates: 37°28′N 104°03′W

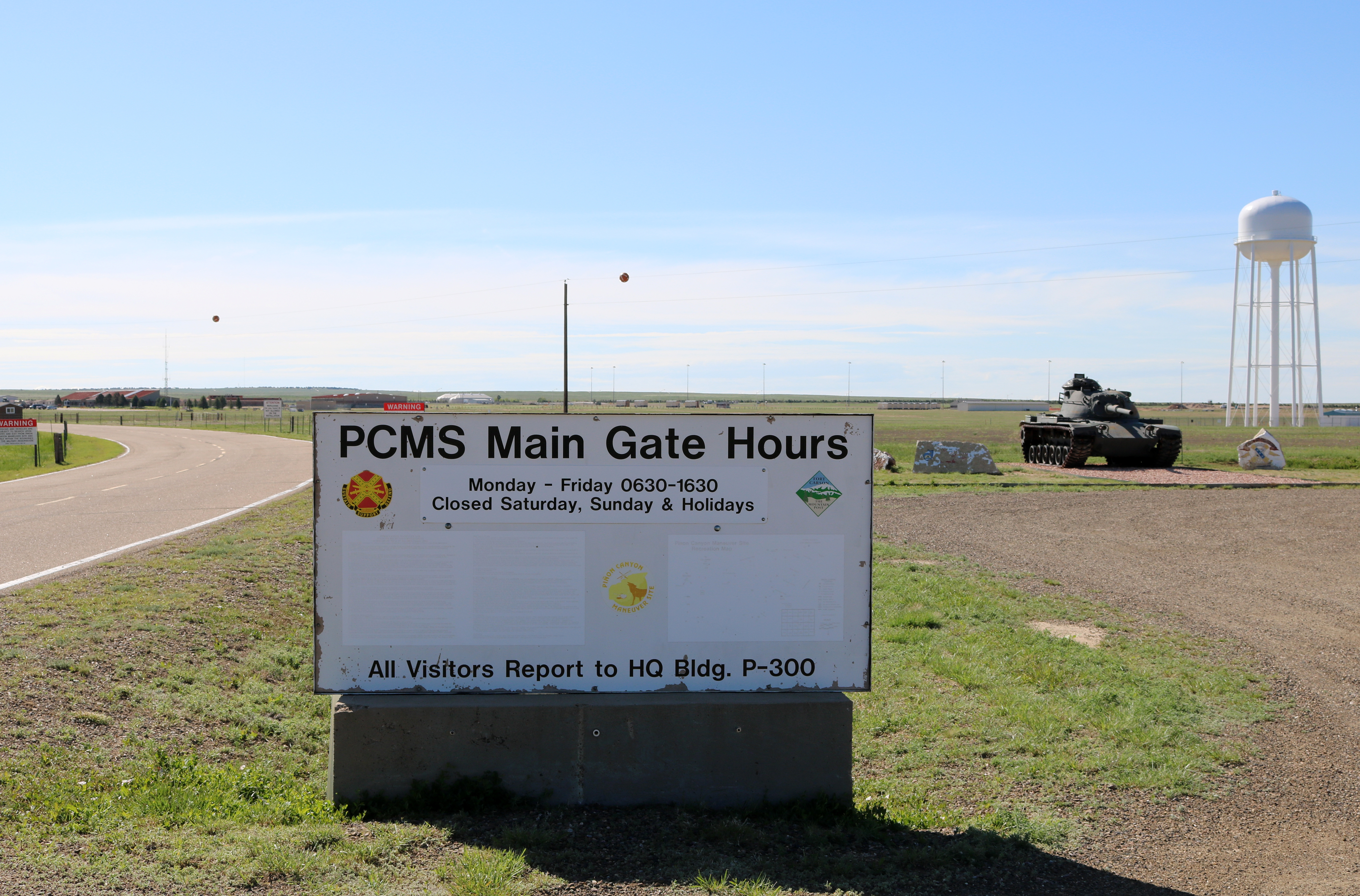
One of the site's entrances along U.S. Route 350.

The Piñon Canyon Maneuver Site (also Pinon and Pinyon) is a 235,896 acre (955 km^{2}) U.S. Army base in southeastern Colorado. The Piñon Canyon Maneuver Site (PCMS) is a training site for Fort Carson. In 2003, the U.S. Army announced a plan to expand PCMS by purchasing additional land mostly owned by individuals devoted to ranching. Local residents and conservation organizations opposed the expansion. In 2013 the Army cancelled the planned expansion.

== Setting ==
PCMS is located northeast of Trinidad, Colorado, and is part of Las Animas County, Colorado. It borders on Comanche National Grassland to its north. The Purgatoire River, locally known as the Picketwire, is its eastern boundary. Elevations on Site range from 4,300 to 5,800 feet (1,311 to 1,768 m) The Site has a semi-arid, steppe climate. Annual precipitation is 12 to 16 inches (305–406 mm). The terrain of PCMS is flat to rolling and dotted with small, rocky hills and mesas. The Purgatoire River flows in a 300–400 feet deep canyon and its tributaries have cut steep arroyos into the terrain. Vegetation is mostly shortgrass prairie mixed with pinyon and juniper trees.

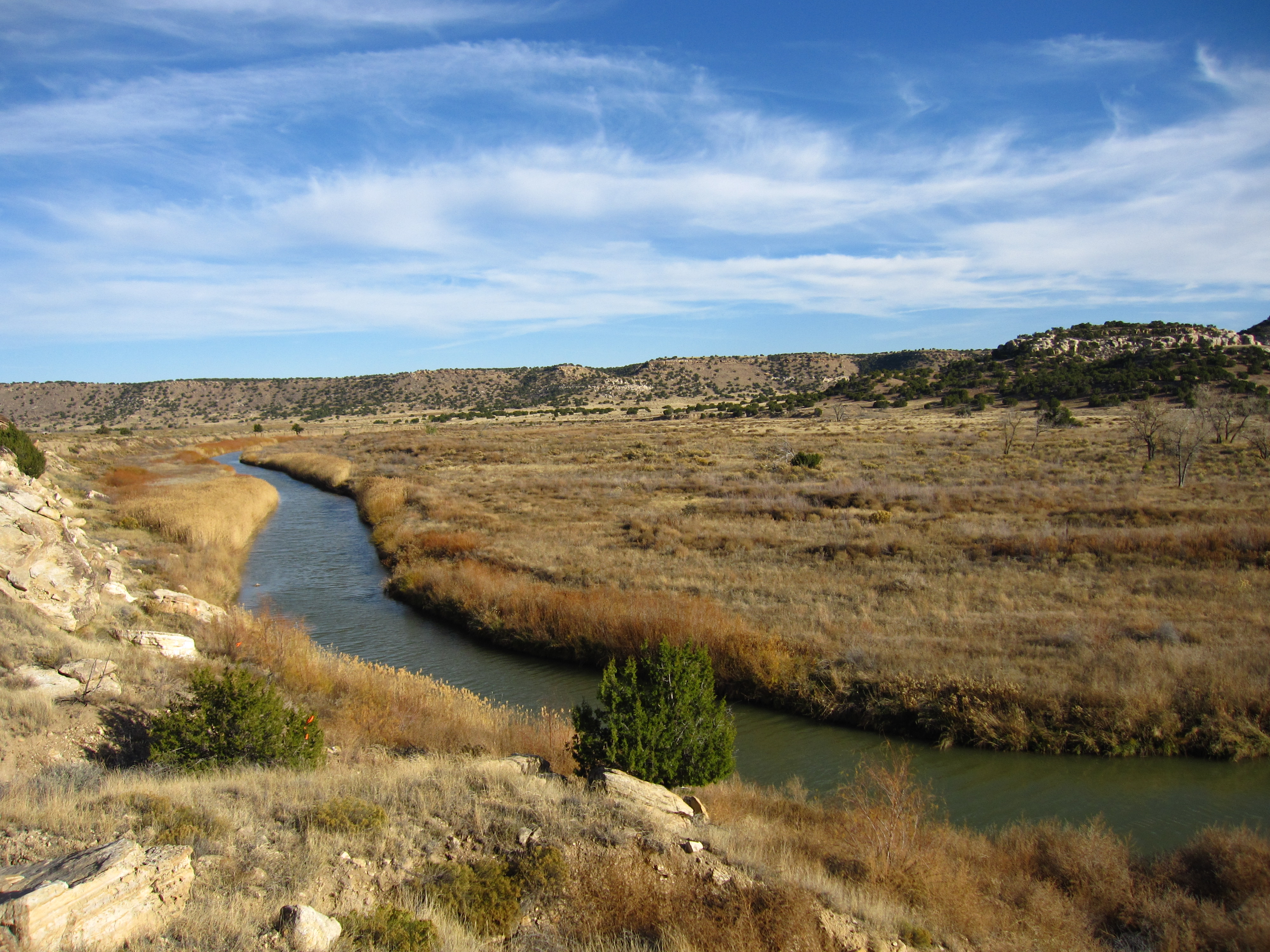
Picketwire Canyon on the Purgatoire River. The Purgatoire River is the eastern boundary of the PCMS.

Prior to the creation of PCMS this area was lightly populated and devoted almost entirely to ranching and livestock grazing. A branch of the Santa Fe Trail runs near PCMS and ancient Indian rock art and petroglyphs are common in the rocky canyons. Pronghorn, Elk, and Mule Deer are the principal large mammals found in the area.

== History, mission, and facilities ==
The Army purchased the land making up PCMS in 1983. Eminent domain was used to acquire almost half the area as many land owners were unwilling sellers. The purpose of PCMS is “to provide critical maneuver lands” for soldiers from Fort Carson and other military bases. PCMS and Fort Carson are second only to Fort Irwin, California in area devoted to maneuver training. In the words of the Army, “PCMS can accommodate a full range of maneuver training, including brigade-level, force-on-force maneuvers.” Facilities on the site include a cantonment area, a railhead, helipads, and an airstrip. PCMS “hosts two major military exercises a year. In each exercise roughly 5,000 troops, 300 heavy tracked vehicles and 400 wheeled vehicles take to the expansive wilderness in month-long, intensive war maneuver exercises."

== Environmental protection ==
The Army has stated that a “unique” feature of PCMS is the emphasis on protecting the environment of the lands under its ownership. The steppe grassland is fragile; the ruts of wagons traveling the Santa Fe Trail are still visible in many places more than 130 years since the last wagon traveled the trail. In 1988, The National Wildlife Federation recognized PCMS for its “outstanding contribution to the wise use and management of the Nation’s natural resources." In 1991, the Army transferred 16,000 acres (65 km^{2}) of land in the Purgatoire River Canyon to the Comanche National Grassland for preservation and recreation. In 2002, the army concluded a cooperative agreement with The Nature Conservancy to establish Conservation easements around the Site.

Cattle grazing has ceased since the Army purchase of the land and elk and pronghorn herds have increased, the latter to more than 1,300. A civilian worker at PCMS said the “land condition is neither better nor worse, just different…we’ve traded cattle trails for tank trails and Humvee trails.”

== Proposed expansion ==
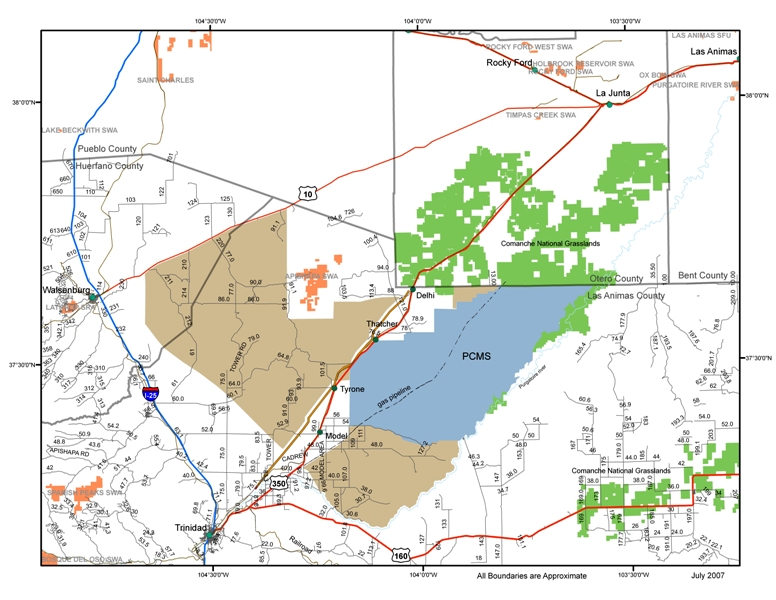
This map shows the existing Piñon Canyon Maneuver Site (blue), phase one of the expansion plan (brown), land of the Comanche National Grassland (green), and Colorado State Wildlife Areas (orange)

In 2003, the Army identified a need to expand PCMS by acquiring 6.9 million acres (27,923 km^{2}) of land owned by private citizens and the Comanche National Grassland in southeastern Colorado. The purpose of the proposed expansion was to permit large-scale military training operations to be conducted. The proposed expansion would make PCMS three times larger than any other military base in the United States—larger in area than the states of Maryland and Massachusetts. The Army estimated that 17,000 residents of the area would have their lands purchased and be displaced. Comanche National Grassland, with more than 400,000 acres (1,600 km^{2}), would be incorporated into the expanded PCMS.

Subsequent studies reaffirmed the need to expand PCMS by acquiring additional land. A 2005 report said that the acquisition would “benefit from an extremely pro-military climate in Southeast Colorado that is more amenable to accepting expansion as part of the Global War on terrorism than some other areas of the country.” That assertion proved to be less than prophetic. As the news of proposed expansion of PCMS became known to the public, two citizen’s organizations were founded to oppose the expansion: The Pinyon Canyon Expansion Opposition Coalition and Not 1 More Acre. They characterized the proposed expansion as “one colossal land grab.” The impetus for these organizations came from ranchers and local citizens in the region who wished to preserve private property and the traditional ranching economy.

Over time, and confronting organized opposition, the Army’s plans for expanding PCMS became more modest. In 2007, the Army proposed to purchase only 418,000 acres (1,690 km^{2}) and only from “willing sellers” rather than resorting to eminent domain. The opposition organizations claimed this proposal was only the first phase of a long range plan to take over most of southeastern Colorado. They also claimed that the Army could not be trusted as it had broken promises it had made in the past, including promises that PCMS would never be expanded, PCMS would benefit the economy, the Army would contribute to local school districts, and live fire would never be used. (Live fire during exercises began in 2004 on the PCMS.)

The Piñon Canyon opposition groups have also criticized environmental groups for their alleged cooperation with the Army. The Army’s expansion plans called for an 80,000-acre (320 km^{2}) conservation zone to be created along the Purgatoire River to be managed by the Nature Conservancy. The Army plan stated that one purpose of the creation of the conservation zone would be to “garner support from eco-groups” for the PCMS expansion. The Nature Conservancy denied that it was cooperating with the Army.

The opposition groups succeeded in obtaining support from Colorado politicians and communities and annual congressional bans on funding the PCMS expansion from 2007 through 2010. However, in November 2010, the Air Force announced a plan to create a low-altitude training range that would include most of southern Colorado and northern New Mexico. To the opponents of the PCMS expansion, this appeared to be an attack from a "different angle" with the Air Force joining the Army in attempting “to militarize the land and air of Southern Colorado.”

The Army proposed in December 2010 that local governments in the region sign a "community covenant" to build better relations and to ensure that local communities receive more economic benefits as a result of the presence of PCMS. The opposition organizations opposed signing the "covenant," proposing instead that the first step in improving relations was for the Army to cancel plans to expand PCMS and to cease citing the service of soldiers "as an instrument of economic development."

In September 2011, Fort Carson officials confirmed discussions over whether to change the name of PCMS to "Fort Carson South," a move criticized by expansion opponents.

== Cancellation of expansion plans ==
On 25 November 2013, the U.S. Army announced that its plan to expand the Piñon Canyon Maneuver site had been cancelled.
