= Weston, Colorado =

Census-designated place in Las Animas County, CO, USA

- Census-designated place
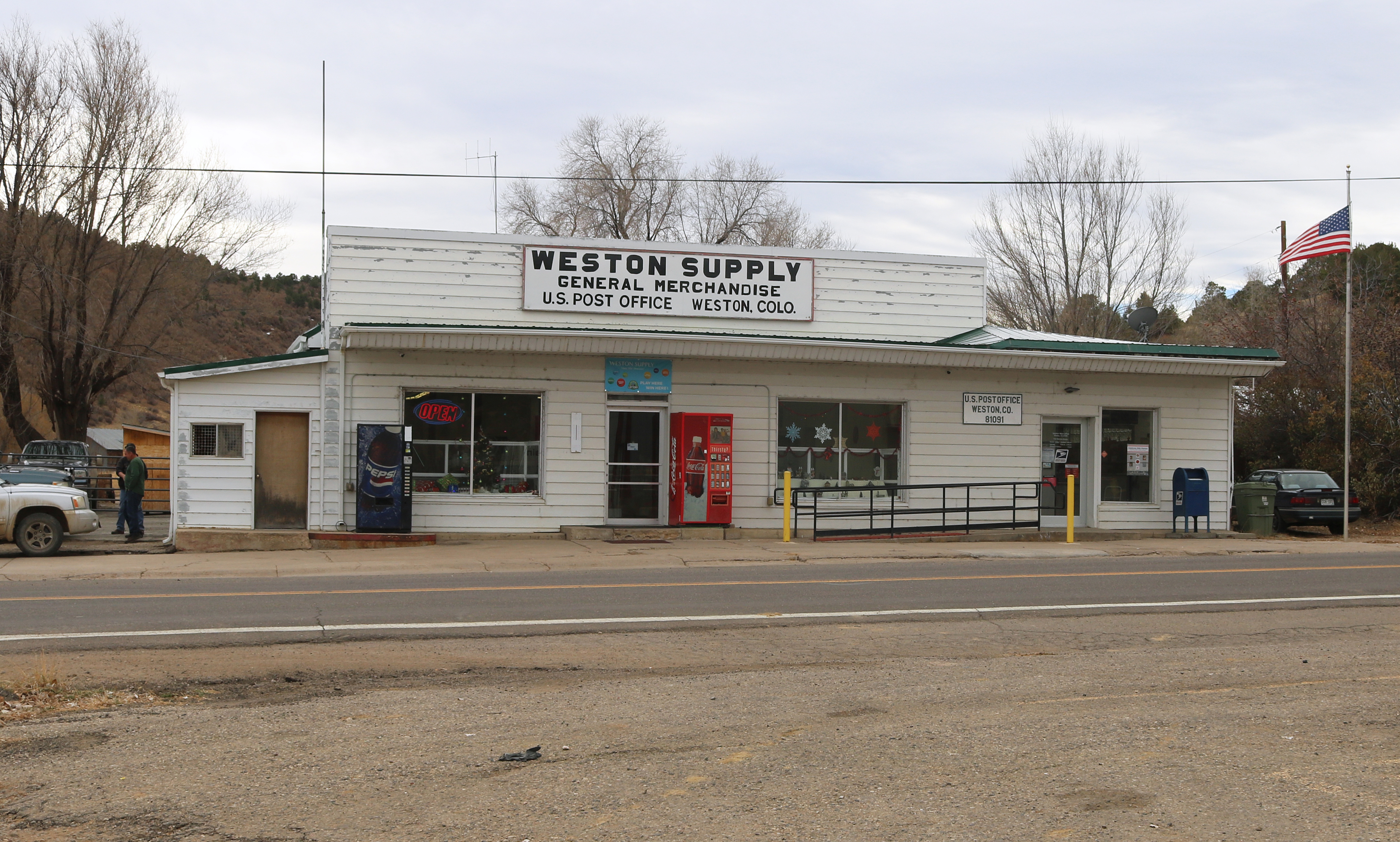
- Weston Supply and U.S. Post Office in Weston.

- Location of the Weston CDP in Las Animas County, Colorado
- Coordinates: 37°08′55″N 104°52′25″W
- Country: United States
- State: Colorado
- County: Las Animas County

Government
  - Type: unincorporated town

Area
  - Total: 3.099 sq mi (8.026 km^{2})
  - Land: 3.099 sq mi (8.026 km^{2})
  - Water: 0 sq mi (0.000 km^{2})
- Elevation: 7,067 ft (2,154 m)

Population (2020)
  - Total: 53
  - Density: 17/sq mi (6.6/km^{2})
- Time zone: UTC-7 (MST)
  - Summer (DST): UTC-6 (MDT)
- ZIP Code: 81091
- Area code: 719
- GNIS feature ID: 2583316

Weston is an unincorporated town, a post office, and a census-designated place (CDP) located in and governed by Las Animas County, Colorado, United States. The Weston post office has the ZIP Code 81091. At the United States Census 2020, the population of the Weston CDP was 53.

== History ==
The Weston Post Office has been in operation since 1889. The community was named after A. J. Weston, a local pioneer.

There is an old church at Vigil Plaza, near Weston.

There is a different old church dating from 1866 or 1867, and a cemetery, about three miles east, at Medina Plaza. These were listed on the National Register of Historic Places in 2019 as Our Lady of Guadalupe Church and Medina Cemetery.

== Geography ==
Weston sits in the valley of the Purgatoire River, on the north side of the river, near where the South Fork joins the main stem. Colorado State Highway 12 passes through the community, leading east (downriver) 22 miles (35 km) to Trinidad, the county seat, and west 11 miles (18 km) to Stonewall Gap.

The Weston CDP has an area of 1,983 acres (8.026 km^{2}), all land.

== Demographics ==
The United States Census Bureau initially defined the Weston CDP for the United States Census 2010.

Weston CDP, Colorado
| Year | Pop. | ±% |
|---|---|---|
| 2010 | 55 | — |
| 2020 | 53 | −3.6% |
Source: United States Census Bureau

== See also ==
- Las Animas County, Colorado
