= Colorado State Highway 12 =

State highway in Colorado, United States

State Highway 12
- Highway of Legends National Scenic Byway
- SH 12 highlighted in red

Route information
- Maintained by CDOT
- Length: 70.39 mi (113.28 km)

Major junctions
- CW end: US 160 in La Veta
- CCW end: I-25 / US 85 / US 87 in Trinidad

Location
- Country: United States
- State: Colorado
- Counties: Huerfano, Las Animas

Highway system
- Colorado State Highway System; Interstate; US; State; Scenic
← SH 11	→ SH 13

State Highway 12 (SH 12), also known as the Highway of Legends National Scenic Byway, in the U.S. state of Colorado is a mountainous state highway through the Rocky Mountains in southern Colorado. The route travels from La Veta through the mountains to Trinidad. It is included in the Colorado Scenic and Historic Byways system and runs through the San Isabel National Forest. In 2021, the highway was designated a National Scenic Byway.

== Route description ==
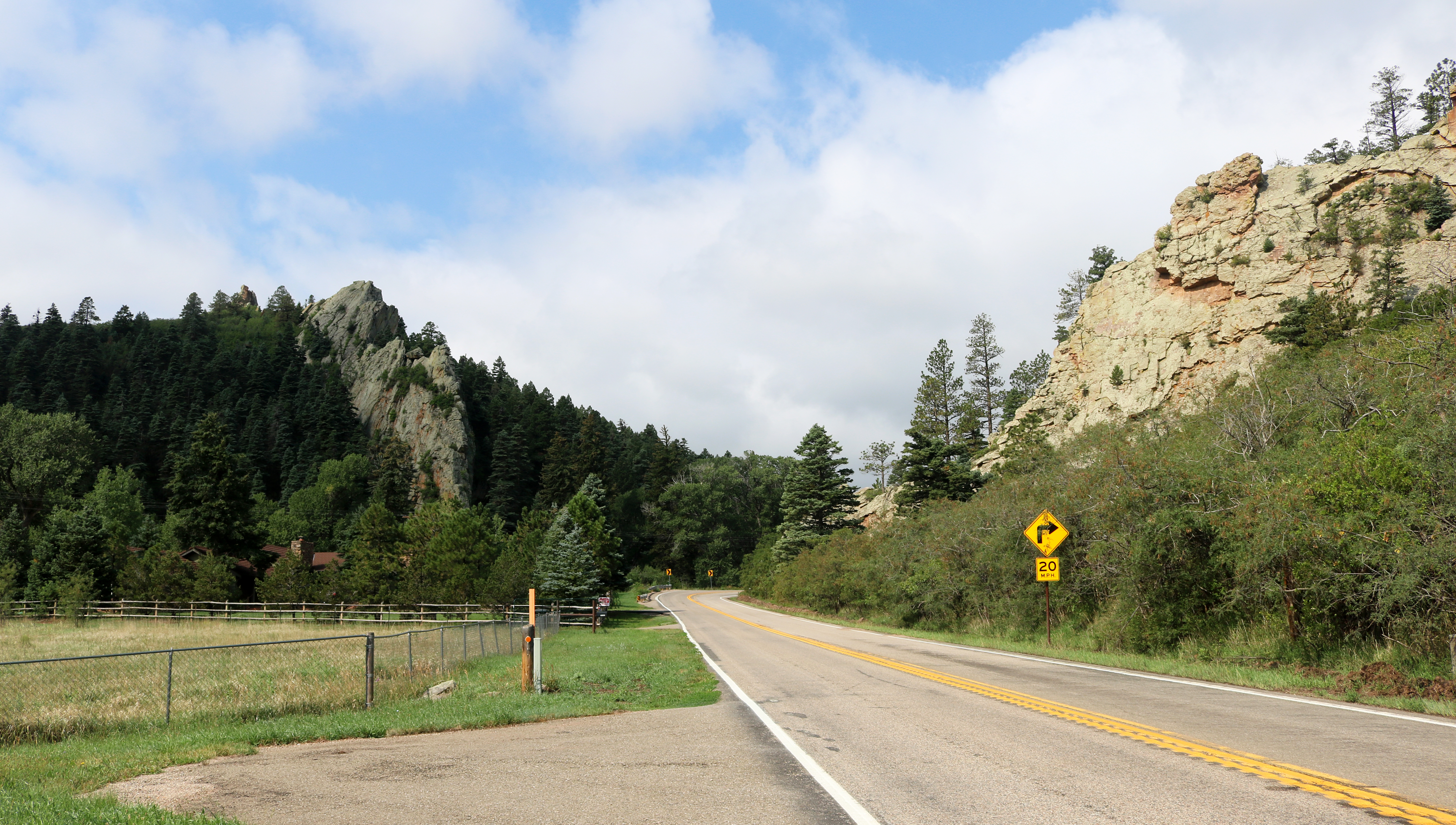
SH 12 looking at The Gap just north of Cuchara

SH 12 begins at the junction with U.S. Route 160 (US 160) north of La Veta. It heads southward through that town before entering the San Isabel National Forest and passing through Cuchara, near the Spanish Peaks Wilderness. It then crosses Cucharas Pass into Las Animas County.

SH 12 heads through Monument Park and turns eastward near Stonewall Gap. It then passes eastward along the Purgatoire River through Weston, Segundo, Valdez, Cokedale, and Jansen. It then ends in Trinidad at an intersection with Interstate 25, US 85, and US 87.

== History ==
The route was established in the 1920s, beginning at Stonewall at SH 111 east to Trinidad and La Junta. The Trinidad-La Junta section was replaced by US 350 in 1957 and the route was paved from Weston to Trinidad in 1939. The entire route was paved by 1946. In 1954, SH 111 was changed, leaving SH 12's terminus without another state highway. In 1970, SH 12 was extended to US 160, and the segment was paved a year later. The route was designated a Colorado Scenic and Historic Byway in 1989.

== Major intersections ==
County	Location	mi	km	Destinations	Notes
Huerfano	La Veta	0.000	0.000	US 160 – Alamosa, Walsenburg	Clockwise terminus; access to Spanish Peaks Regional Health Center
Cucharas Pass		22.266	35.834	Summit (elevation 9,941 feet (3,030 m))	
Las Animas	Trinidad	70.485	113.435	I-25 (US 85 / US 87) – Raton, Pueblo	Counterclockwise terminus; I-25 exit 13
1.000 mi = 1.609 km; 1.000 km = 0.621 mi

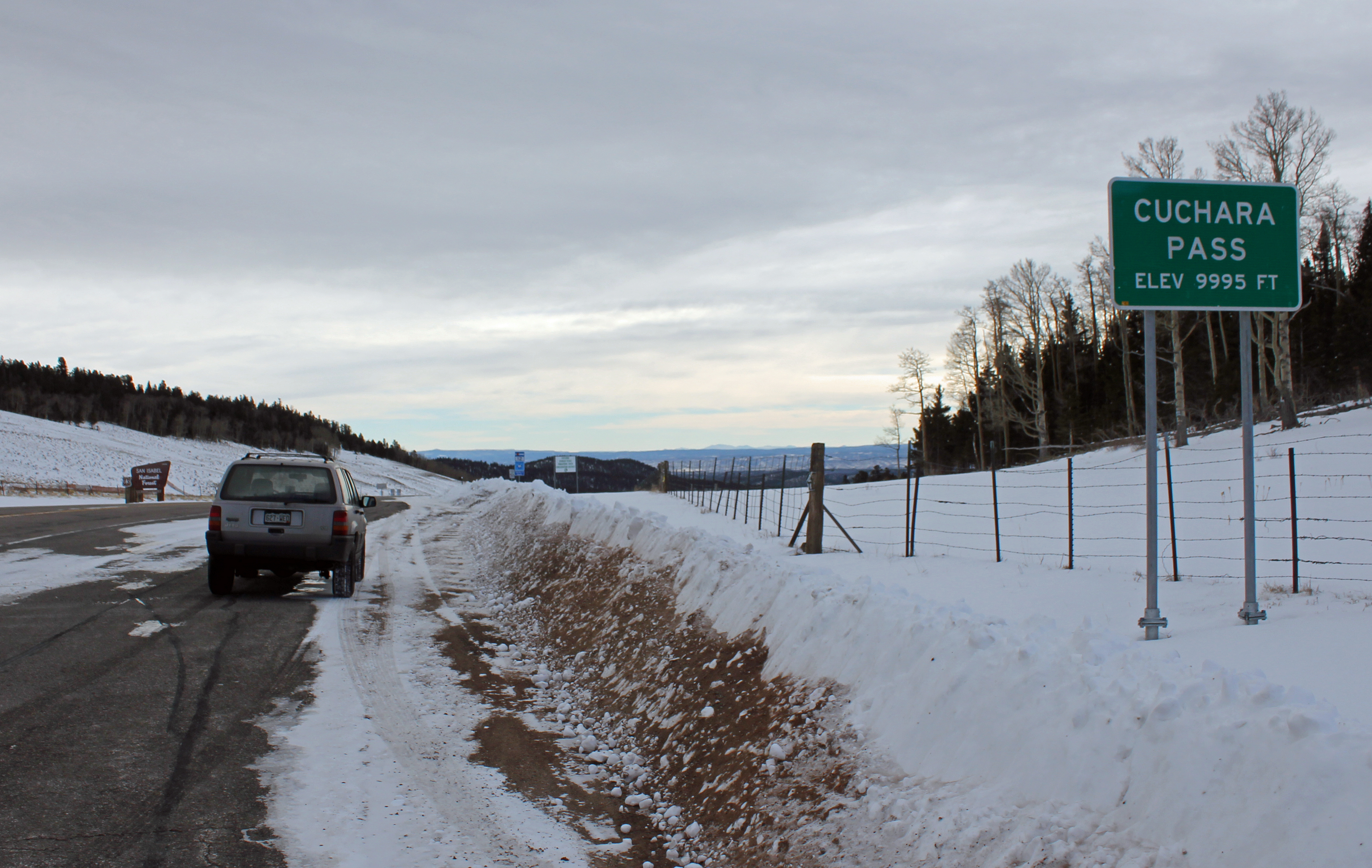
Cuchara Pass on Highway 12.

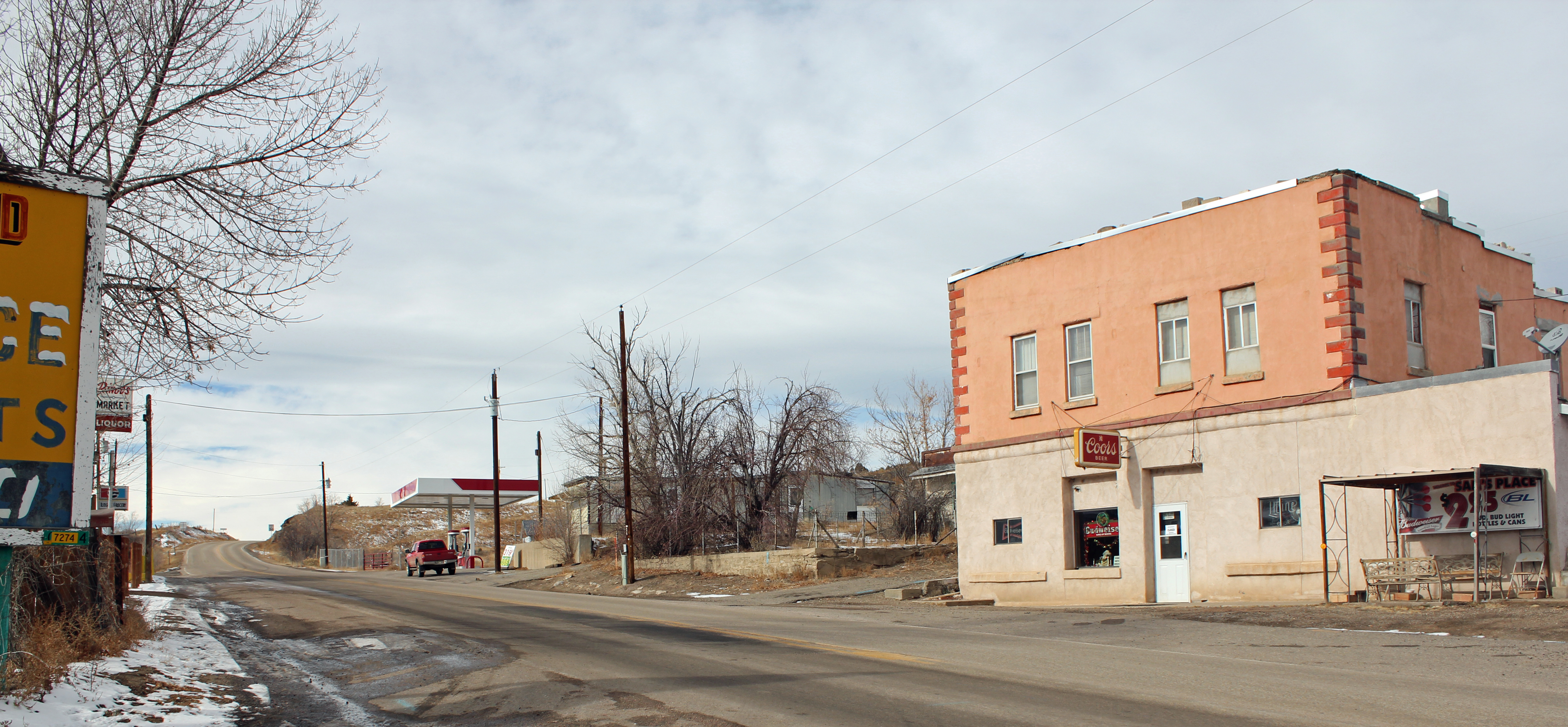
The highway as it passes through Segundo, Colorado.

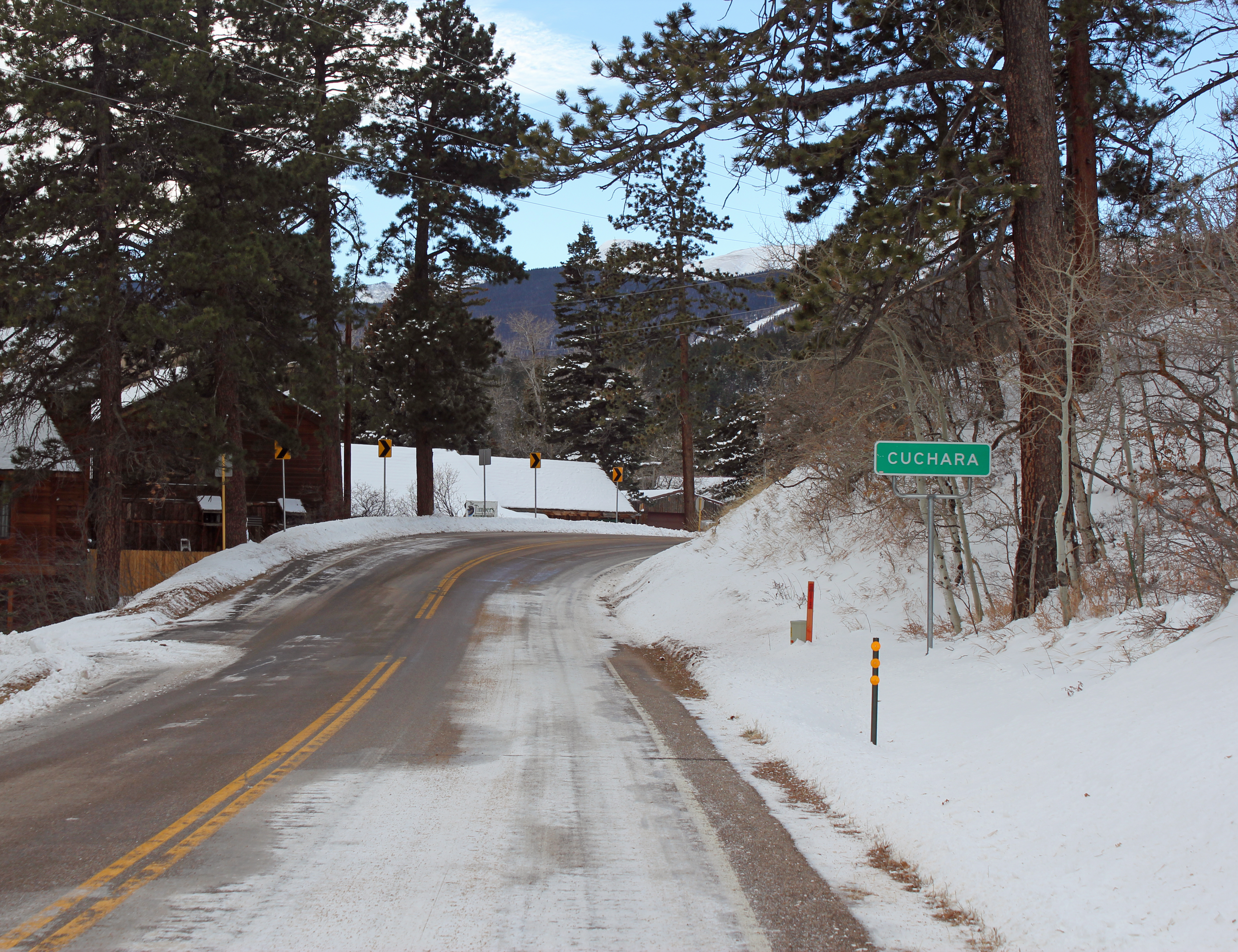
The highway as it passes through the town of Cuchara, Colorado.
