= Cucharas Pass =

Mountain pass in Colorado, USA

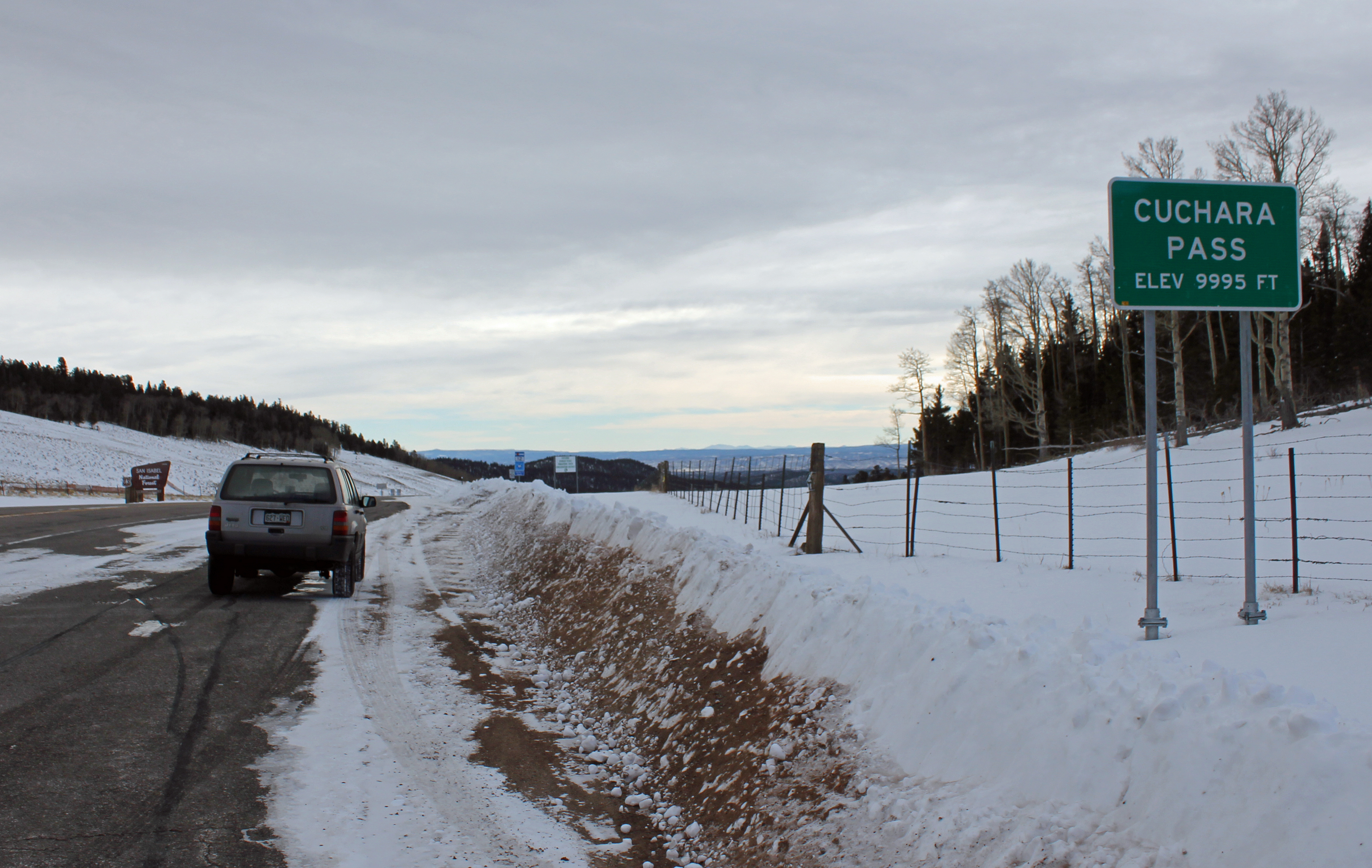
- The pass in December, 2012.
- Interactive map of Cucharas Pass
- Elevation: 9,995 ft (3,046 m)
- Traversed by: SH 12

Third Approach
- Location: Las Animas / Huerfano counties, Colorado, United States
- Range: Sangre de Cristo Mountains
- Coordinates: 37°19′13″N 105°04′25″W
- Topo map: USGS Cucharas Pass

Cucharas Pass is a 9,995 ft (3,046 m) elevation mountain pass in the Sangre de Cristo Mountains in south central Colorado in the United States.

At the top, the pass is signed as Cuchara Pass and the elevation on the sign there reads 9995 ft. State Highway 12 traverses the pass. Highway 12 is also signed as the Highway of Legends Scenic Byway, one of Colorado's Scenic and Historic Byways.

The region gets its name from the spoon-like shape of the valley, with "cuchara" being the Spanish word for "spoon."
