= Purgatoire River =

River in southeastern Colorado

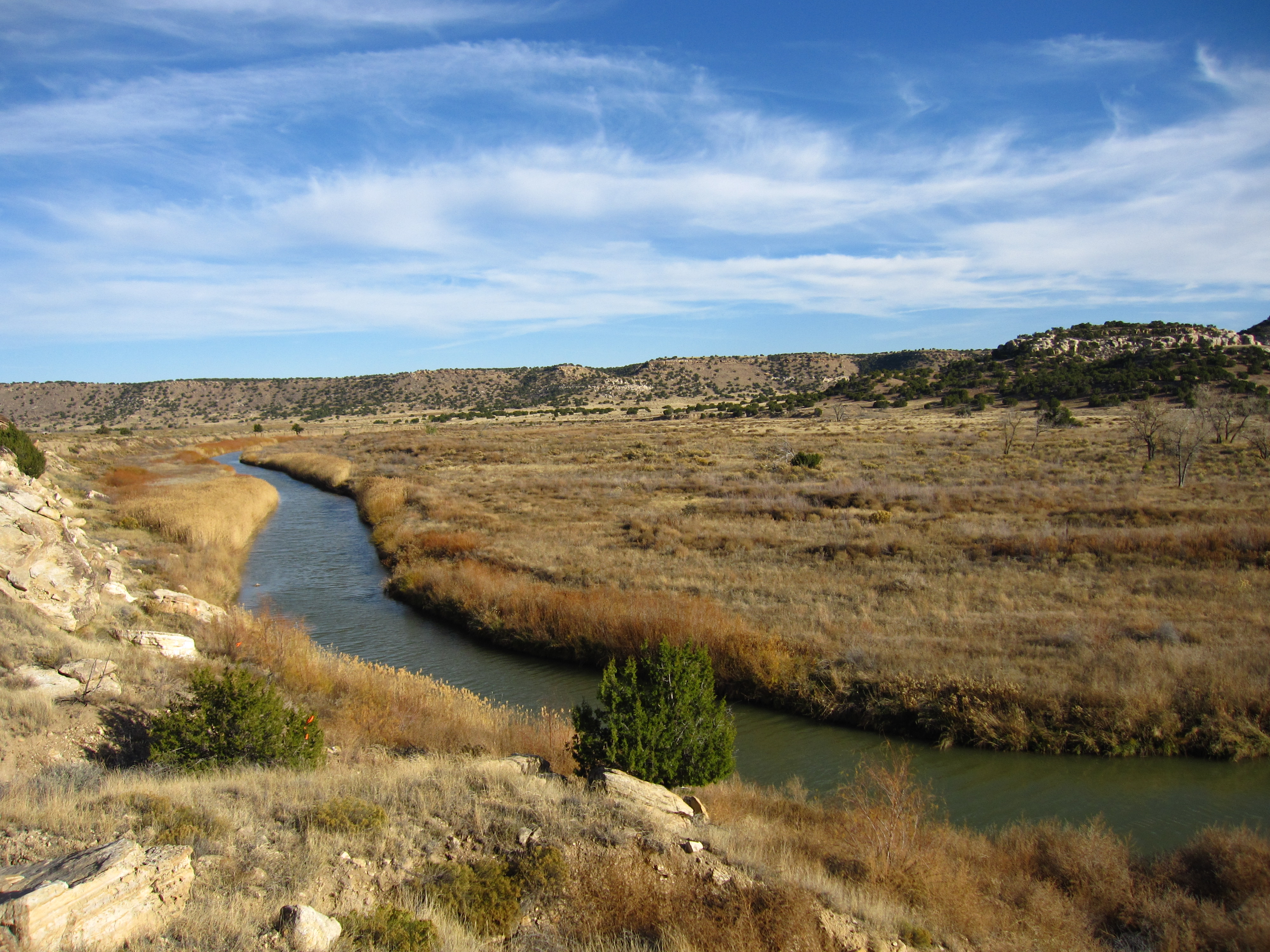
- The Purgatoire River has cut a canyon through the Great Plains.

Physical characteristics
- Source
  - location: Confluence of North Fork and Middle Fork
  - coordinates: 37°09′26″N 104°56′27″W
  - elevation: 14,053 ft (4,283 m)
- Mouth
  - location: Confluence with Arkansas
  - coordinates: 38°03′54″N 103°10′37″W
  - elevation: 3,852 ft (1,174 m)
- Basin size: 3,449 mi^{2} (8,930 km^{2})
- Discharge
  - location: Las Animas, Colorado
  - average: 60 ft^{3}/sec

Basin features
- Progression: Arkansas—Mississippi

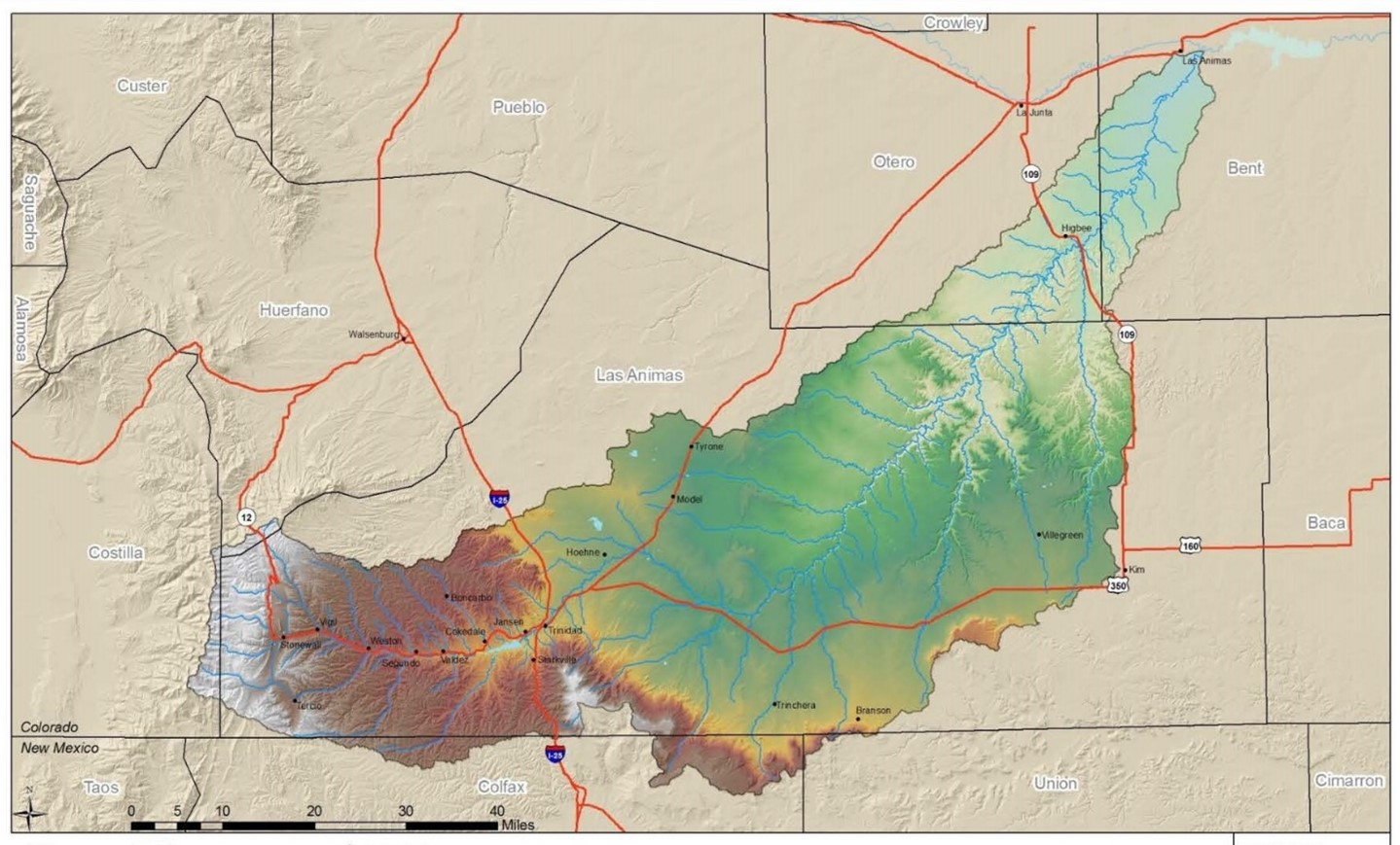
The watershed of the Purgatoire River, Colorado and New Mexico

The Purgatoire River (Spanish: Rio de las Ánimas & Río Purgatorio), also known as the Purgatory and Picketwire River, is in southeastern Colorado, United States. The river originates in the high mountains of the Culebra Range. Several tributaries merge near Weston in Las Animas County and the river flows east-northeastward 196 miles (315 km) to a confluence with the Arkansas River near Las Animas in Bent County, Colorado. The Purgatoire River drains an area of 3,449 square miles (8,930 km^{2}), mostly in Colorado but a small percentage of the watershed is in New Mexico. The Purgatoire River watershed is lightly populated. Population has been declining since 1920 as former coal mining and agricultural communities have become ghost towns.

== Geography ==
The Purgatoire River rises in the Culebra Range of the Sangre de Cristo Mountains reaching an elevation of 14,053 ft (4,283 m) at Culebra Peak. The river, formed by many upstream tributaries, flows eastwards for about 40 miles (64 km) through the mountains and foothills to Trinidad at an elevation of 6,010 ft (1,830 m) where it turns to the northeast and flows across the Great Plains through several canyons it has cut through the bedrock. It empties into the John Martin Reservoir and the Arkansas River near the town of Las Animas at an elevation of 3,852 ft (1,174 m). The Purgatoire River watershed has an area of 3,449 sq mi (8,930 km^{2}). 96.4% of the watershed is in Colorado and the remainder is in New Mexico. Average annual precipitation ranges from 43 in (1,100 mm) in the Culebra Range to 13 in (330 mm) near its mouth. Ground cover in the watershed consists of 18.4 percent evergreen forest at higher elevations, 20.0 percent shrub and scrub at medium elevations, and 55.7 percent steppe grassland at lower elevations. The remaining 5.9 percent is mostly under cultivation, developed, or barren rock above timberline.

Most of the water in the Purgatoire originates from melting snow at higher elevations. The flow of the river is highly variable depending upon the season, averaging about 60 cubic feet per second (cfs). Periods of zero water flow have been recorded near Thatcher, Colorado and the Pinon Canyon Maneuver Site, a large (in area) U.S. army base on the west side of the river.

Most of the land in the Purgatoire watershed is privately owned, but the headwaters are in the San Isabel National Forest and land along or near the river on the Great Plains belongs to the Comanche National Grassland, including Picketwire Canyon with one of the largest numbers of dinosaur tracks in the world. Fishers Peak State Park and Trinidad Lake State Park are recreational lands in the watershed.

The Purgatoire River watershed is lightly populated and its population has been declining for almost 100 years. Las Animas County in which most of the watershed is located has seen its population drop by more than 60 percent since 1930. Two towns, Trinidad and Las Animas, are located near the river. Many former coal mining and agricultural communities, now ghost towns, are in the watershed.

== History and etymology ==
The Purgatoire River, also known as Rio de las Ánimas, has had multiple names. It was named by New Mexican Governor Antonio Valverde y Cosío in 1719 during his exploration of the region. Valverde named it "Rio de las Ánimas," meaning "River of the Spirits," as a warning to subsequent explorers of the dangers of crossing the nearby Ratón Pass. Surviving the crossing, they found water and firewood at the river. Over time, the true meaning of the river's name became lost, and various interpretations emerged. By the end of the 18th-century Spanish traders believed it to be "Rio de las Ánimas en Purgatorio," or "River of the Souls in Purgatory," after a supposed massacre that occurred on its banks. This led to the birth of a legend of the same name that explained its history. French trappers learned the name and later translated it as "Rivière des âmes au Purgatoire." They related their translation to members of the Stephen H. Long expedition in 1820 who renamed it "Purgatory Creek" by removing all references to souls. Mexican traders on the old Santa Fe Trail expanded on the legend and named the river "Rio de las Ánimas Perdidas en Purgatorio," or "River of the Souls Lost in Purgatory," believing the souls to have become lost. Mountain Men had difficulty pronouncing the French translation and called it "Picatoire," while Anglophone settlers during the Colorado Gold Rush anglicized it to "Picketwire," despite the river having no relation to any fence.

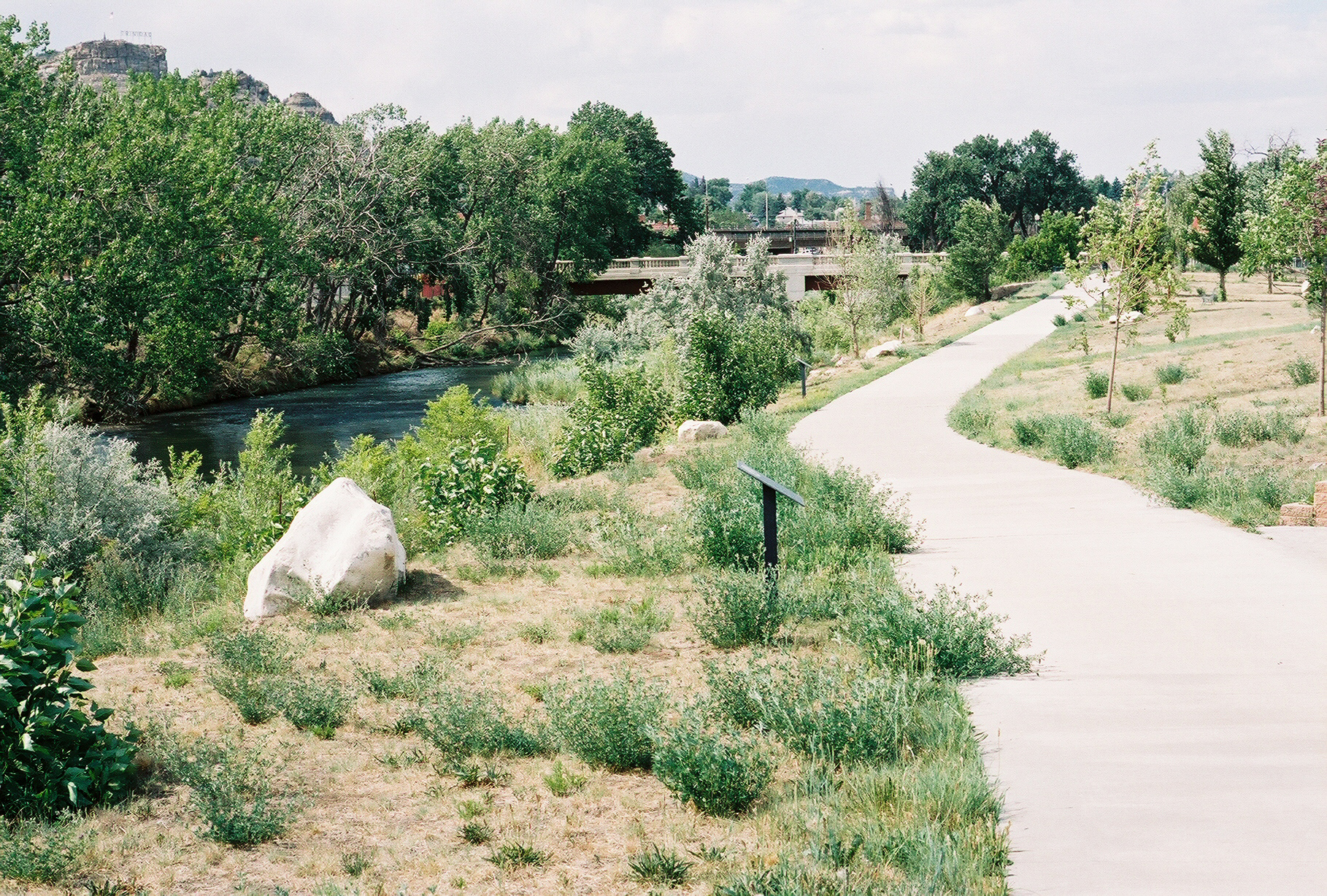
The Purgatoire River at Trinidad.

Depending on the language spoken, the river had five different names - Ánimas, Purgatorio, Purgatoire, Purgatory, and Picketwire - by the end of the 19th century. On December 6, 1911, the US Board on Geographic Names resolved the naming issue by selecting the French translation "Purgatoire" as the official name of the river.

Despite the various misinterpretations and name changes, the Las Animas-Purgatoire River remains an essential symbol of Colorado's history and legends as it is one of the state's oldest continuously named rivers, spanning over 300 years. Ironically, most locals today refer to it simply as "Purgatory" due to the difficulties associated with pronouncing the full name.

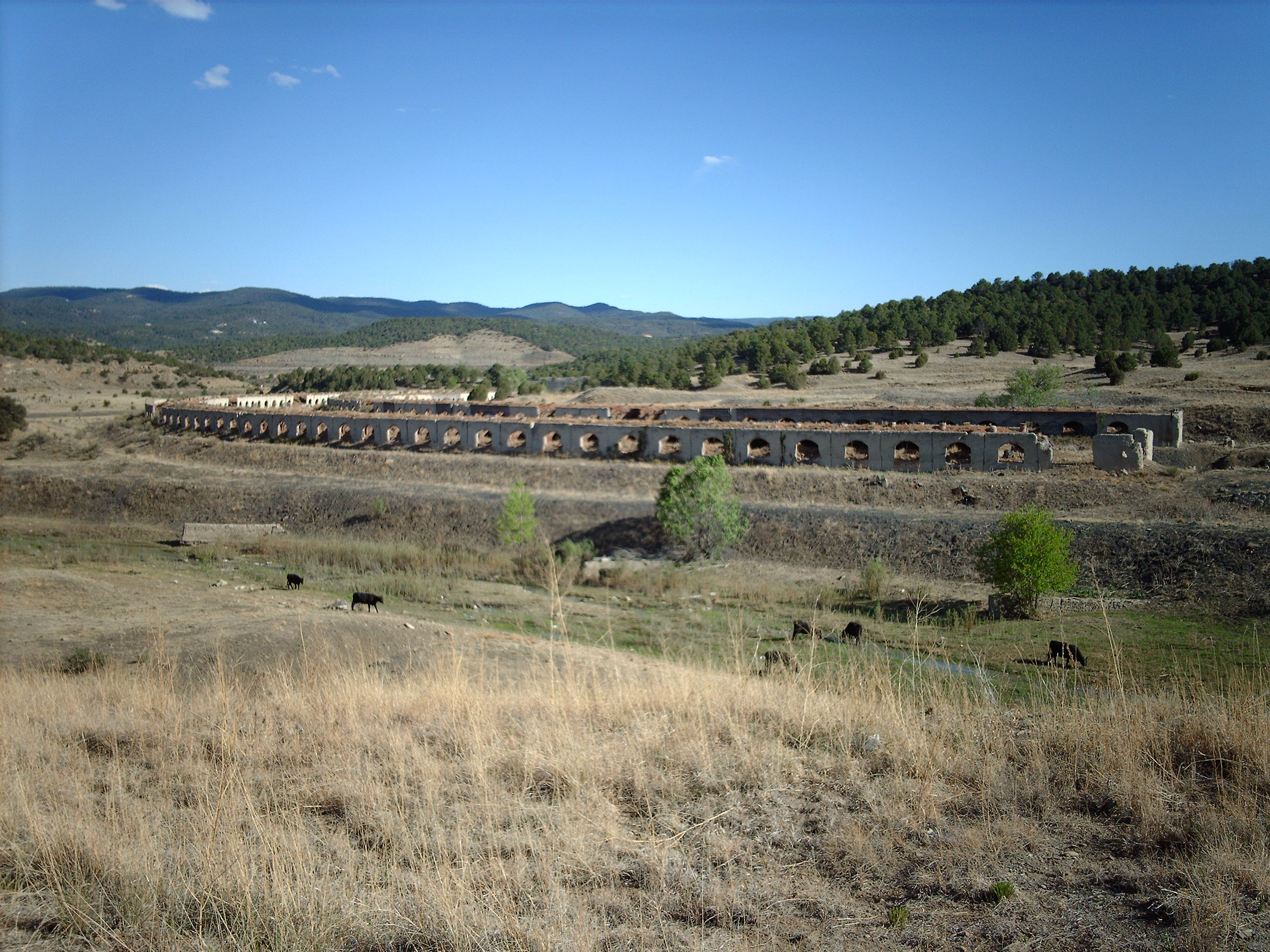
The Coke Ovens of Cokedale. Coal mining was previously the major economic activity west of Trinidad.

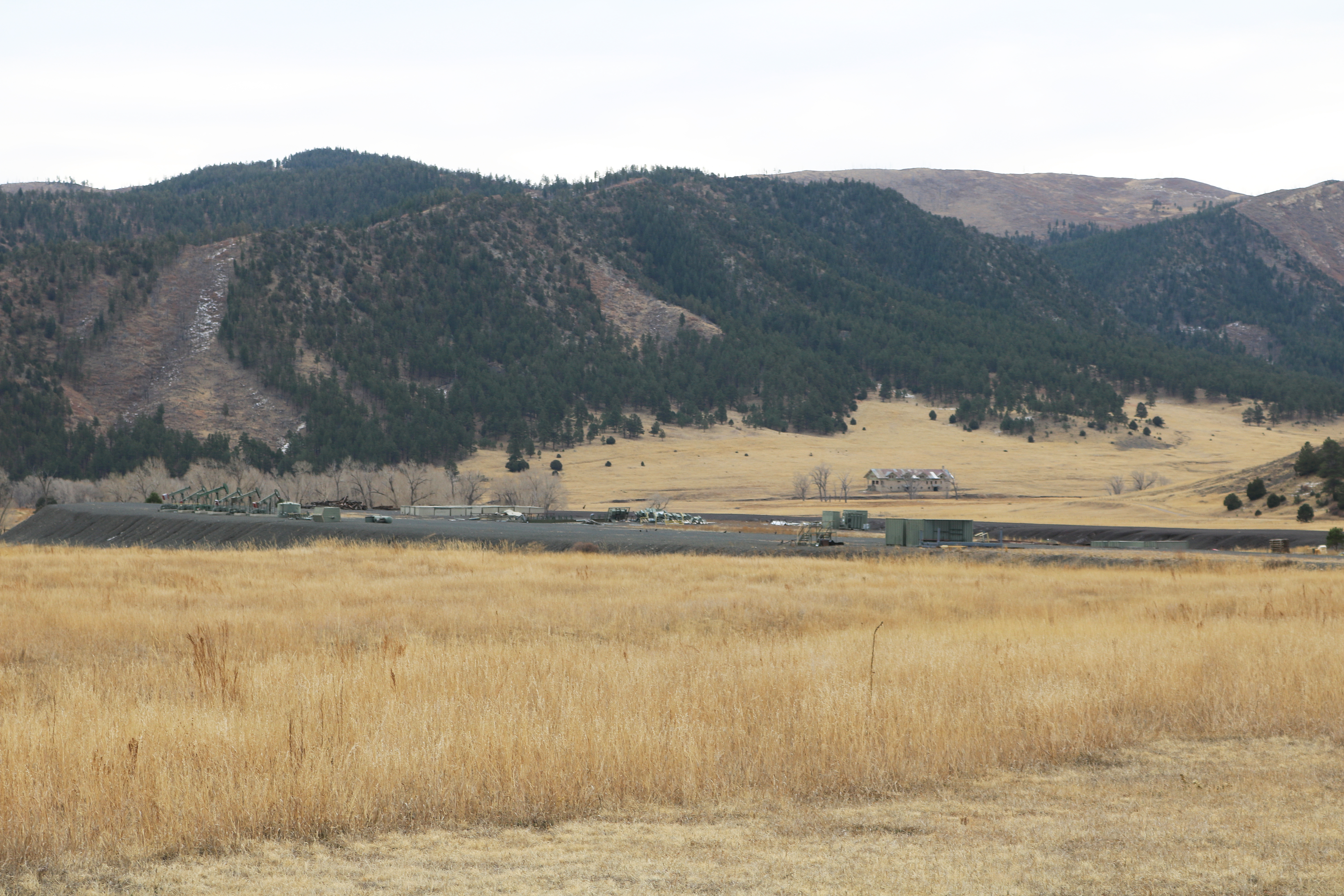
The remains of the coal mining town of Tercio: a slag pile and the abandoned company store (center).

=== Settlement ===
In 1598 when the Spanish first settled in New Mexico, the Purgatoire River was the home of the Jicarilla Apache. The Southern Utes also frequented the area and after 1700 the Comanche occupied the Great Plains of southeastern Colorado. Several Spanish expeditions passed through the Purgatoire region. In 1821, American traders pioneered the Santa Fe Trail to New Mexico. The Mountain Branch of the trail crossed the Purgatoire watershed near Trinidad and went through Raton Pass. In 1841, the south bank of the Purgatoire from the crest of the Sangre de Cristos extending eastward almost to the future site of Trinidad were part of the Maxwell Land Grant awarded to Lucien Maxwell by the New Mexican government. In 1846, New Mexico was conquered by the United States.

The first settlers arrived in the Purgatoire valley in the late 1850s or early 1860s. Ninety percent of the early settlers in the Purgatoire watershed were Hispanics and they were farmers and ranchers. Severe winters and drought forced many of the farmers and ranchers out of the region in the 1880s. In the 1910s an era began of large ranches, mostly Anglo-owned, on the Great Plains portion of the Purgatoire watershed. Coal mining began at Starkville in 1865 and soon became the major economic activity in the hilly and mountainous country west of Trinidad. By the early 1900s the coal mines in the Purgatoire watershed employed thousands of men, most of them born in southern and eastern Europe. Collectively they were called "Slavs." Labor disputes, unsafe working conditions, and diminishing demand for coal caused most of the mines to shut down after World War I (1914–1918). Most of the former coal mining towns were abandoned.

The population of Las Animas County (in which most of the watershed is located) declined from 38,975 in 1920 to 14,535 in 2020.

=== PCMS ===
The Piñon Canyon Maneuver Site (PCMS), belonging to the U.S. Army, comprises a large land area used for seasonal maneuvers and training exercises. It is located along the western bank of the Purgatoire River. Plans to expand the base aroused the opposition of local ranchers and citizen groups. On November 25, 2013, the U.S. Army announced that it had abandoned its plan to expand the PCMS. Near the PCMS is the Purgatoire River track site, one of the largest dinosaur fossil track sites in North America. The site is located on public land of the Comanche National Grassland, along the Purgatoire River south of La Junta in Otero County. The canyon walls of the Purgatoire River near Trinidad are the site of large-scale carvings and paintings created over several decades by Martin Bowden (1884–1958). His work in the area later became known as the Painted Canyon.

== Cultural references ==
The river is frequently referred to as the Picketwire River in the film The Man Who Shot Liberty Valance (1962), and once in the film True Grit (2010). This is a folk-etymologizing anglophone phonological approximation of the French pronunciation /pyʁ.ɡa.ˡtwaʁ/, developed by English-speaking settlers who later came to the area.

The Purgatoire River is referenced in the 2017 Netflix miniseries Godless. It is also mentioned as the Purgatory in the Pulitzer Prize winning book Lonesome Dove by Larry McMurtry, as the place where the renegade Blue Duck goes into hiding.

== See also ==
- List of rivers in Colorado
- Purgatoire River track site
- Comanche National Grassland
