= National Register of Historic Places listings in Las Animas County, Colorado =

Location of Las Animas County in Colorado

This is a list of the National Register of Historic Places listings in Las Animas County, Colorado.

This is intended to be a complete list of the properties and districts on the National Register of Historic Places in Las Animas County, Colorado, United States. The locations of National Register properties and districts for which the latitude and longitude coordinates are included below, may be seen in a map.

There are 38 properties and districts listed on the National Register in the county, one of which is also a National Historic Landmark. Another 3 properties were once listed but have been removed.

This National Park Service list is complete through NPS recent listings posted April 24, 2026.

== Current listings ==
| | Name on the Register | Image | Date listed | Location | City or town | Description |
|---|---|---|---|---|---|---|
| 1 | 7-D School | 7-D School | December 22, 2009 (#09001120) | County Road 171 north of County Road 50.6; 37°21′29″N 103°35′35″W | Branson | |
| 2 | Aultman House | Aultman House | July 11, 2007 (#07000673) | 37°10′31″N 104°30′59″W | Trinidad | |
| 3 | Baca House and Outbuilding | Baca House and Outbuilding | February 26, 1970 (#70000165) | 300 block of Main St. 37°10′09″N 104°30′09″W | Trinidad | Now part of the Trinidad History Museum |
| 4 | Frank G. Bloom House | Frank G. Bloom House | February 26, 1970 (#70000166) | 300 block of Main St. 37°10′10″N 104°30′07″W | Trinidad | Now part of the Trinidad History Museum |
| 5 | Bridge over Burro Canon | Bridge over Burro Canon | February 4, 1985 (#85000216) | State Highway 12; 37°07′26″N 104°44′26″W | Madrid | |
| 6 | Carnegie Public Library | Carnegie Public Library | April 14, 1995 (#95000438) | 202 N. Animas St. 37°10′05″N 104°30′28″W | Trinidad | |
| 7 | Cokedale Historic District | Cokedale Historic District | January 18, 1985 (#85000083) | Roughly bounded by Church, Maple, Pine, Elm, and Spruce Sts. 37°08′32″N 104°37′10″W | Cokedale | |
| 8 | Colorado Millennial Site | Colorado Millennial Site | April 8, 1980 (#80000877) | At the source of Rule Creek, 2 miles (3.2 km) south of the junction of Baca, Bent, and Las Animas counties 37°37′01″N 103°04′43″W | Ruxton | Extends into Baca County |
| 9 | Corazon de Trinidad | Corazon de Trinidad | February 28, 1973 (#73000482) | Roughly bounded by the Purgatoire River on the north and west, Walnut St. on the east, and 3rd, W. 1st and Animas Sts. on the south 37°10′07″N 104°30′20″W | Trinidad | |
| 10 | Earl School | Earl School | October 23, 2013 (#13000844) | Address Restricted | Earl | Part of the Rural School Buildings in Colorado MPS |
| 11 | East Street School | East Street School | December 19, 2007 (#07001277) | 206 East St. 37°10′15″N 104°29′43″W | Trinidad | |
| 12 | Charles Emerick House | Charles Emerick House | March 18, 2014 (#14000059) | 1211 Nevada Ave. 37°10′47″N 104°30′38″W | Trinidad | |
| 13 | First Baptist Church | First Baptist Church | January 28, 2000 (#00000005) | 809 San Pedro St. 37°10′31″N 104°30′27″W | Trinidad | |
| 14 | First Christian Church | First Christian Church | November 7, 1995 (#95001246) | 200 S. Walnut St. 37°10′08″N 104°30′02″W | Trinidad | |
| 15 | First Methodist Episcopal Church | First Methodist Episcopal Church | August 7, 2005 (#05000783) | 216 Broom St. 37°10′25″N 104°30′38″W | Trinidad | |
| 16 | Foster House Stage Station and Hotel Site | Foster House Stage Station and Hotel Site | March 31, 2015 (#15000110) | Address Restricted | Aguilar | |
| 17 | Jaffa Opera House | Jaffa Opera House | February 7, 1972 (#72000275) | 100-116 W. Main St. 37°10′05″N 104°30′19″W | Trinidad | |
| 18 | Kim Schools | Kim Schools | April 24, 2007 (#07000342) | 425 State St. 37°14′49″N 103°21′10″W | Kim | |
| 19 | Frank Latuda House | Frank Latuda House | January 27, 2010 (#09001275) | 431 W. Colorado Ave. 37°10′31″N 104°30′47″W | Trinidad | |
| 20 | Ludlow Tent Colony Site | Ludlow Tent Colony Site | June 19, 1985 (#85001328) | Del Aqua Canyon Rd. 37°20′22″N 104°35′00″W | Ludlow | Site of the nineteenth-century Ludlow massacre of rioting miners, recently yielding archeological findings. Declared a National Historical Landmark in 2009. |
| 21 | McCormick House | McCormick House | November 4, 2009 (#09000869) | 1919 Pinon St. 37°10′56″N 104°31′14″W | Trinidad | Large Queen Anne house completed in 1891. |
| 22 | Monument Lake Park Building and Hatchery Complex | Monument Lake Park Building and Hatchery Complex | November 24, 2014 (#14000950) | 4789 CO 12; 37°12′38″N 105°02′51″W | Weston | |
| 23 | Nichols House | Nichols House | August 30, 2005 (#05000930) | 212 E. 2nd St. 37°10′02″N 104°30′07″W | Trinidad | |
| 24 | Our Lady of Guadalupe Church and Medina Cemetery | Our Lady of Guadalupe Church and Medina Cemetery | November 15, 2019 (#100004628) | CO Hwy. 12; 37°07′45″N 104°47′59″W | Medina Plaza | The church dates from 1866 or 1867 and may be known more commonly as Nuestra Senora de Guadalupe. |
| 25 | Pleasant Valley School | Pleasant Valley School | August 13, 2008 (#08000764) | County Road 143 just south of U.S. Route 160; 37°09′42″N 103°51′02″W | Branson | |
| 26 | Raton Pass | Raton Pass | October 15, 1966 (#66000474) | U.S. Routes 85/87 along the Colorado/New Mexico border 36°59′19″N 104°29′11″W | Trinidad | |
| 27 | Rourke Ranch Historic District | Rourke Ranch Historic District | September 21, 2000 (#00001047) | Comanche National Grassland; 37°35′27″N 103°38′35″W | La Junta | |
| 28 | Santa Fe Trail Mountain Route Trail Segment-Delhi Vicinity I | Santa Fe Trail Mountain Route Trail Segment-Delhi Vicinity I | June 8, 2015 (#15000313) | Address Restricted | Delhi | |
| 29 | Santa Fe Trail Mountain Route Trail Segment-Delhi Vicinity II | Santa Fe Trail Mountain Route Trail Segment-Delhi Vicinity II | June 8, 2015 (#15000314) | Address Restricted | Delhi | |
| 30 | Santa Fe Trail Mountain Route Trail Segment-Delhi Vicinity III | Santa Fe Trail Mountain Route Trail Segment-Delhi Vicinity III | June 8, 2015 (#15000315) | Address Restricted | Delhi | |
| 31 | Starkville Central School | Starkville Central School | September 13, 2018 (#100002911) | 8801 Cty. Rd. 69.0; 37°07′03″N 104°31′24″W | Starkville | |
| 32 | Temple Aaron | Temple Aaron | December 11, 2023 (#100009802) | 407 South Maple Street; 37°09′59″N 104°30′10″W | Trinidad | |
| 33 | Torres Cave Archeological Site | Torres Cave Archeological Site | April 29, 1980 (#80000911) | Address Restricted | Villegreen | |
| 34 | Trinchera Cave Archeological District | Trinchera Cave Archeological District | October 22, 2001 (#01001120) | Along Trinchera Creek, 8.5 miles (13.7 km) north of Trinchera; 37°09′58″N 104°00′53″W | Trinchera | |
| 35 | US Post Office-Trinidad Main | US Post Office-Trinidad Main | January 22, 1986 (#86000188) | 301 E. Main St. 37°10′11″N 104°30′09″W | Trinidad | |
| 36 | Margarito Varras Homestead | | August 1, 2014 (#14000455) | Address restricted | Kim | |
| 37 | White School | White School | August 1, 2008 (#08000740) | Junction of County Roads 30 and 191; 37°12′22″N 103°24′31″W | Kim | |
| 38 | Zion's German Lutheran Church | Zion's German Lutheran Church | October 25, 2006 (#06000950) | 510 Pine St. 37°10′24″N 104°30′49″W | Trinidad | |

== Former listings ==
| | Name on the Register | Image | Date listed | Date removed | Location | City or town | Description |
|---|---|---|---|---|---|---|---|
| 1 | Avery Bridges | | 1985 (#85001403) | September 16, 2002 | County Road over Leitensdorfer Arroyo and Apishapa River | Aguilar and Hoehne | A set of two identical bridges. Both were demolished in 1991. |
| 2 | Commercial Street Bridge | Commercial Street Bridge | February 4, 1985 (#85000217) | July 22, 1994 | Commercial Street; 37°10′24″N 104°30′49″W | Trinidad | Replaced in January, 1990. |
| 3 | Elson Bridge | Elson Bridge | February 4, 1985 (#85000215) | September 16, 2002 | County Road 36 | El Moro | The bridge was disassembled and moved to Pueblo in 1994 or 1995. It is now a pedestrian bridge called Fay's Crossing. It goes over Santa Fe Avenue and carries the Runyon Commuter Trail. The bridge remains on the Colorado State Register of Historic Properties. |

== See also ==
- List of National Historic Landmarks in Colorado
- List of National Register of Historic Places in Colorado
- Bibliography of Colorado
- Geography of Colorado
- History of Colorado
- Index of Colorado-related articles
- List of Colorado-related lists
- Outline of Colorado
