= Arthur Roy Mitchell =

American western painter and illustrator

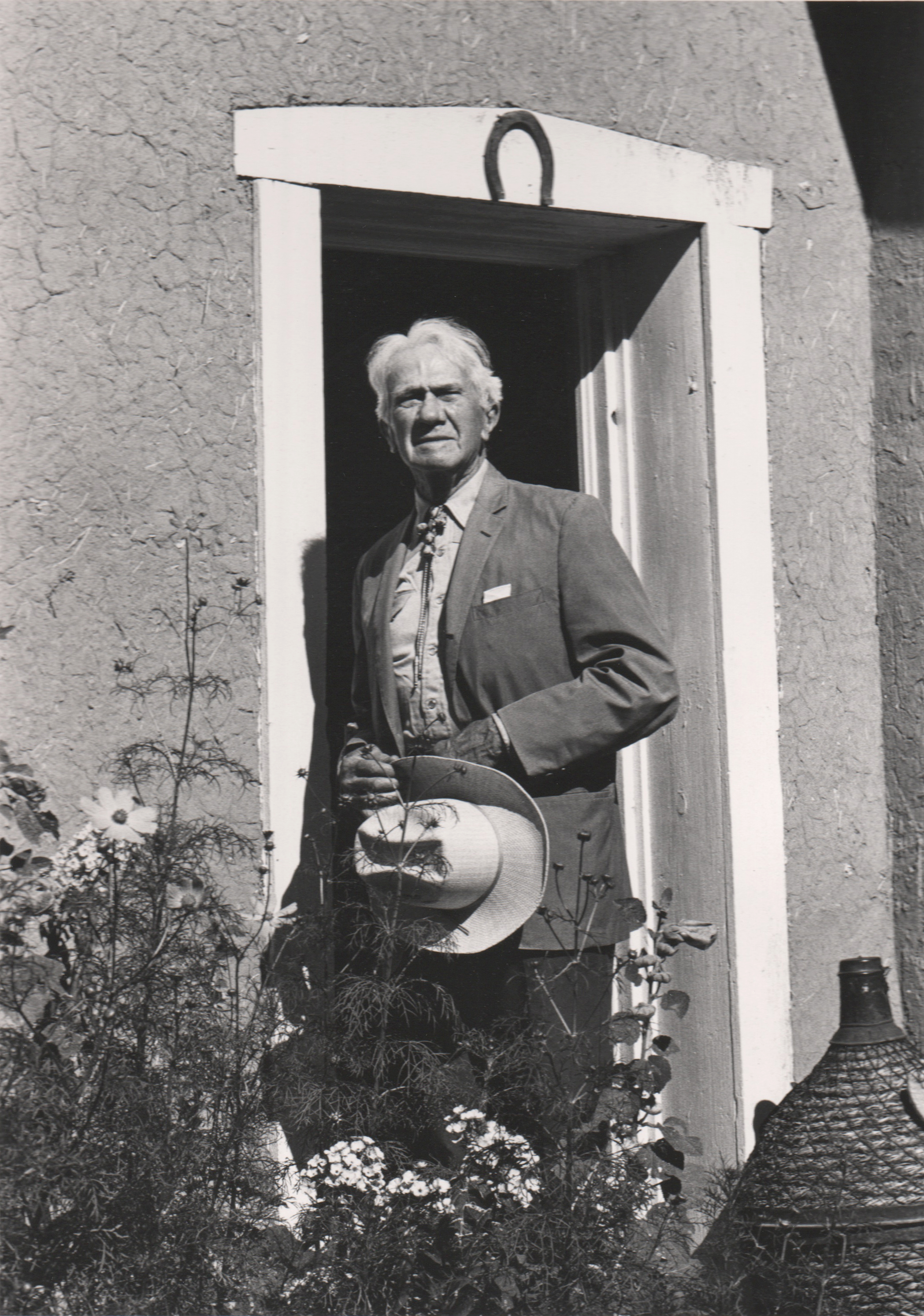
- Born: December 18, 1889; Near Trinidad, Colorado, U.S.
- Died: November 15, 1977 (aged 87); Denver, Colorado, U.S.
- Other names: A. R. Mitchell; Roy Mitchell
- Education: Grand Central School of Art
- Occupations: Artist, education, museum curator, art director
- Known for: Artwork for the covers of Western pulp magazines and creator of the centennial emblem for Colorado; The "Rush to the Rockies" emblem for the anniversary of the 1859 Colorado gold rush

Arthur Roy (A. R.) Mitchell (December 18, 1889 – November 15, 1977) was an American painter, illustrator, art teacher, historian and preservationist, best known for his paintings and illustrations that were often featured on the covers of the western pulp novels and magazines.

He designed the centennial emblem for Colorado and for the anniversary of the 1859 Colorado gold rush, he created the "Rush to the Rockies" emblem. Among his awards, he was inducted into the National Academy of Western Art at the National Cowboy & Western Heritage Museum.

Mitchell helped establish both the Baca House and Bloom Mansion as historic sites and are now both parts of the Trinidad History Museum. He was the curator and was the historian of the Trinidad Historic District until 1975. In 1962, Mitchell received the community's Outstanding Service Award for his contributions to the museums.

== Early life and career ==
Mitchell was born on December 18, 1889 near Trinidad, Colorado to Tipton D. and Bessie A. Mitchell. He had two sisters, Hattie and Ethel "Tot" Mitchell-Erickson. He was the middle child between Hattie and Tot. After several years, the family moved to Trinidad proper, residing four blocks from the Old Santa Fe Trail.

Mitchell went to New Mexico Territory (1850–1912) to work as a ranch hand in 1907. He worked for the Adams Cattle Company at the Vermejo Park Ranch. In 1912, he worked as advertising and circulation manager at the Trinidad Chronicle News. He worked as an artist and drew political cartoons for newspapers. In 1913, he began working for an advertising agency in Boise, Idaho. He sold advertising for a Walla Walla, Washington newspaper.

Mitchell served during World War I (1914–1918), having enlisted in March 1918 in Walla Walla, Washington. He was a member of the 166th Depot Brigade of the Regular Army National Guard Enlisted Reserve Corps Regiment. Mitchell was discharged on November 30, 1918, after the end of the war. In 1919, he started working for the Seattle Post-Intelligencer.

== Education ==
In the fall of 1925, Mitchell followed friend and fellow artist Harold von Schmidt to New York City to study at the Grand Central School of Art under teacher Harvey Dunn. There, Dunn, von Schmidt, and Mitchell became lifelong friends. The three frequently traveled to Trinidad to paint the surrounding area. In 1927, Dunn decided to move his classes to his personal studio in Leonia, New Jersey and Mitchell followed him there.

== Career ==
=== Artist ===
In 1927, Mitchell sold the first of his paintings to publishers for use as covers for the western pulp magazines Northwest Stories and Cowboy Stories. His paintings were used on covers of Wild West Weekly, All Western, and Popular Western. In 1935, Mitchell started creating artwork for book covers, including that of The Spur of Time, The End of Black Jack, and The Spider Web Trail for the publishing house Houghton Mifflin Company. He collected items that a cowboy would use, like saddles, camp coffee pots, Indian blankets, and pottery for his works of art. He depicted the lives of cowboys, cowgirls, and Native Americans in the prairies and plains of northern New Mexico and southern Colorado. His portrayed battles of Native Americans, people traveling along the Santa Fe Trail, with images of notable western men like Kit Carson and Billy the Kid. By the 1940s, Mitchell sold over 160 paintings that were used as cover art for pulp books and magazines. His was called "The King of Western Pulp."

Mitchell produced numerous landscape paintings, often pulling the car over while driving to paint en plein air. In the early 1940s, Mitchell moved back to Trinidad, Colorado. Mitchell continued painting while there, with many of the paintings depicting the surrounding area of Stonewall Gap.

He designed the centennial emblem for Colorado and for the anniversary of the 1859 Colorado gold rush, he created the "Rush to the Rockies" emblem. Governor Stephen McNichols announced the selection of the emblem to be used on souveniors and promotional items approved by the Centennial Commission.

=== Educator ===
Mitchell taught at Trinidad State Junior College, where he started the first art class in 1945 and continued to teach there in 1958. While there, he taught several notable students, including Paul Milosevich. During the summer of 1948, he taught art at the Western State College in Gunnison.

=== Museum co-founder and director ===
Mitchell helped establish both the Baca House and Bloom Mansion as historic sites and are now both parts of the Trinidad History Museum. Baca House is associated with the Historic Resources of the Santa Fe Trail, 1821–1880. In 1955, Mitchell and some friends purchased the Baca House to prevent it from being torn down. They were able to turn it into a museum, with the stipulation that Mitchell would be the curator. He held that position and was the historian of the Trinidad Historic District until 1975. Some of Mitchell's works are among the Baca House collection. In 1962, Mitchell received the community's Outstanding Service Award for his "foresight and leadership in the preservation and restoration of two historically and architecturally important landmarks in Trinidad."

=== Awards and honors ===
Mitchell was recognized in the following ways,

- 1972 - named an honorary member of the Cowboy Artists of America
- 1973 - inducted into the National Academy of Western Art at the National Cowboy & Western Heritage Museum
- 1974 - received the Honorary Trustees Award from the National Cowboy and Western Heritage Museum

== Personal life and death ==
Mitchell never married. New Legends Magazine stated that, "his work was his one true love." He moved to Denver in 1975 to be close to his sister, Tot. In Denver, he continued to paint until his death on November 15, 1977. He is buried at the Masonic Cemetery in Trinidad, Colorado.

== A.R. Mitchell Western Art Museum ==
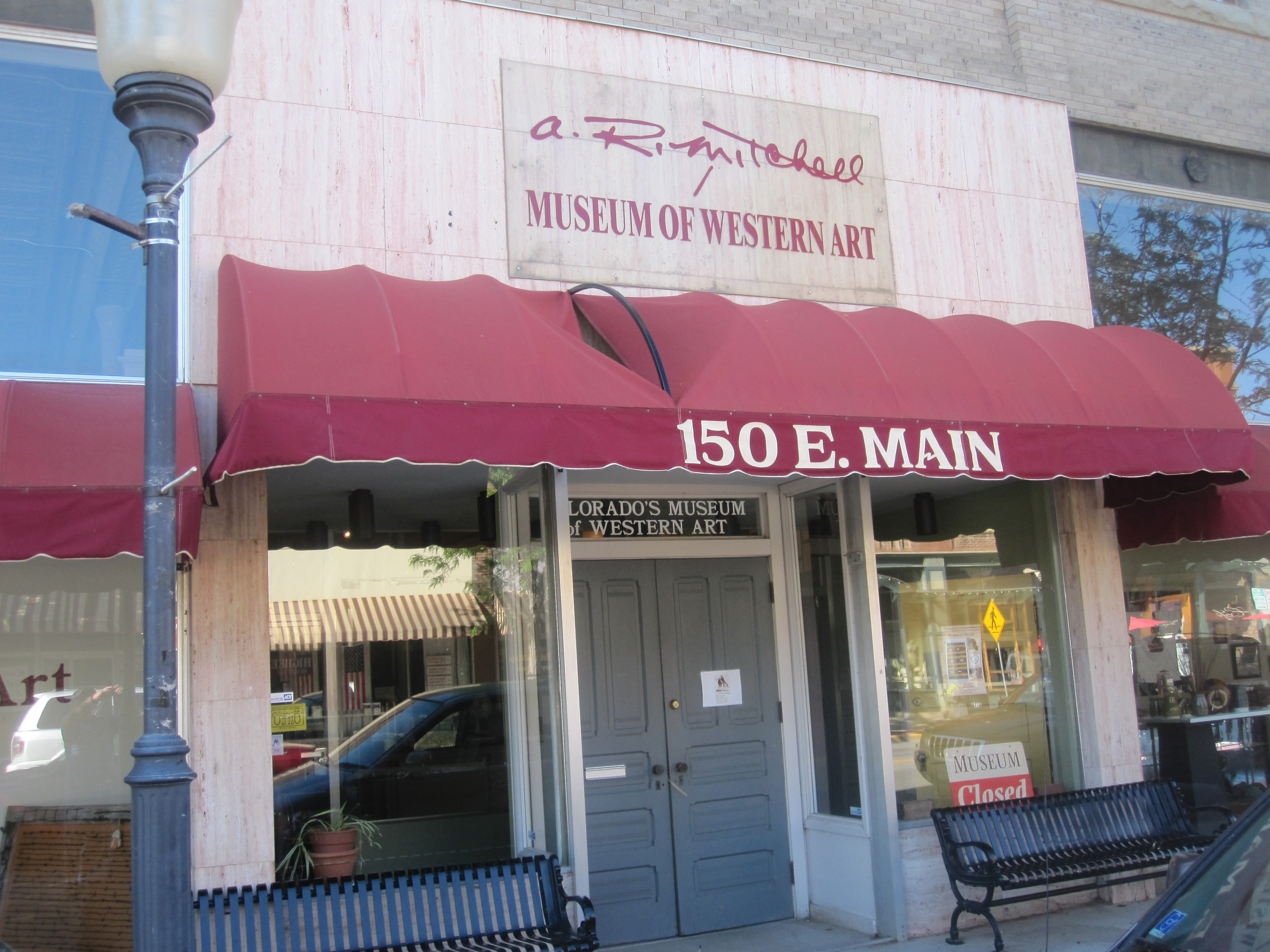
A.R. Mitchell Museum of Western Art

Following Mitchell's death, his sister, Ethel "Tot" Mitchell-Erickson, decided to donate her and her brother's western art and historical memorabilia collection to a museum. In 1981, the A.R. Mitchell Western Art Museum was established. The museum's collection has over 350 artworks and thousands of sketches created by Mitchell, as well as works by his contemporaries like Harvey Dunn and Harold von Schmidt, and various western and south western historical objects.
