= John Hough =

John Hough may refer to:

- John Hough (director) (born 1941), British film and television director
- John Simpson Hough (1833-1919), American entrepreneur on the Santa Fe Trail, builder of the Baca House in Trinidad, Colorado
- John Hough (bishop) (1651–1743), English bishop

== See also ==
- John Haugh (1930–1998), Irish hurler
- Jack Hough (1916–1971), Australian politician
