= James Murdoch (architect) =

Scottish-born American architect

James Murdoch (1844–1914) was "an important architect in Denver in the late 19th and early 20th centuries". Several of his works are listed on the National Register of Historic Places (NRHP). At least two of his works have been designated Denver landmarks.

He was born in Scotland in 1844. He arrived in Denver in 1888. He died in 1914.

He served as superintendent of the Colorado State Capitol, with office in the building, and as such was a contributing architect in its completion.

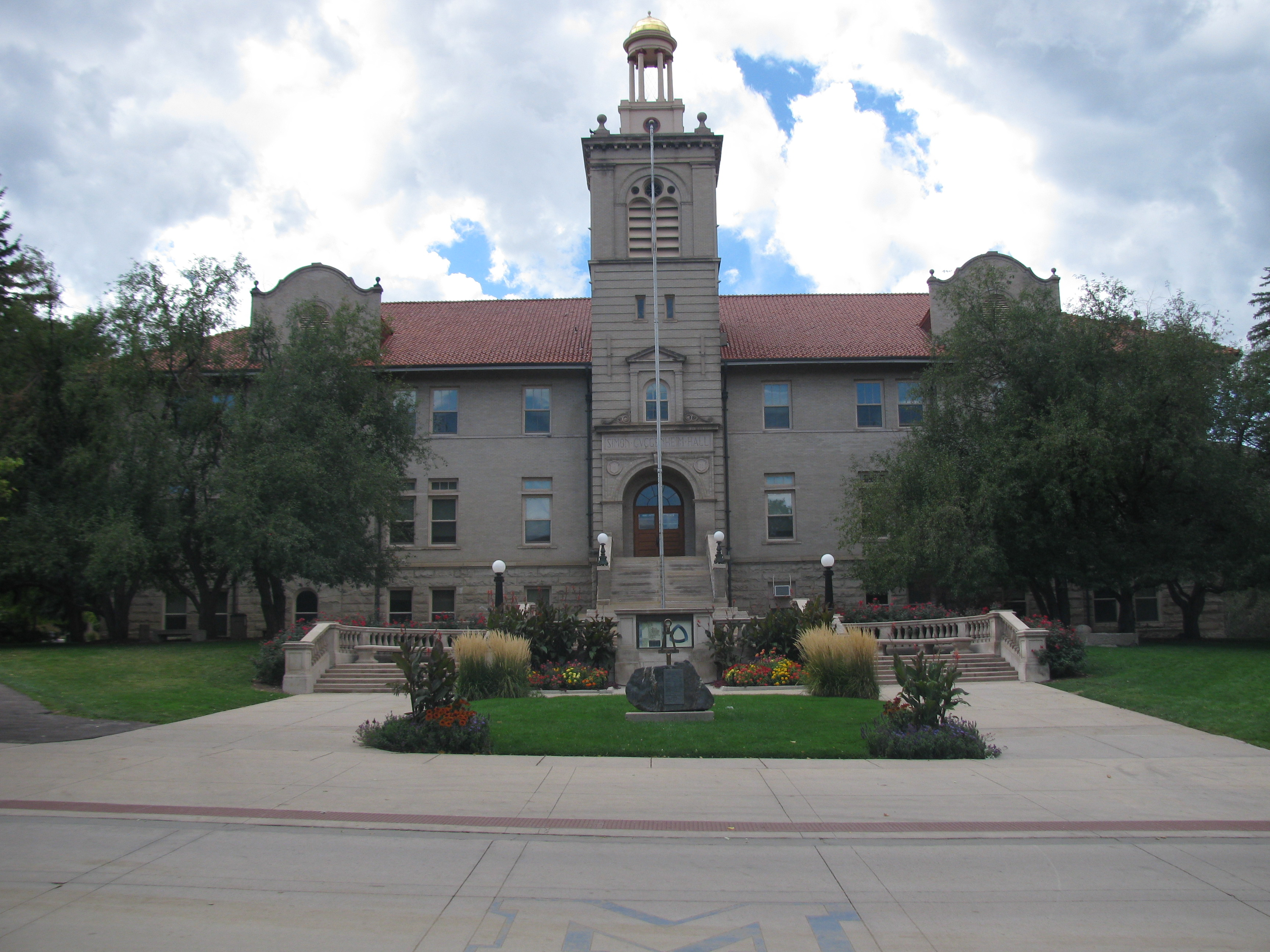
Guggenheim Hall, at Colorado School of Mines

Works include:

- All Saints Episcopal Church (1890), at 2222 W. 32nd Avenue, Denver; NRHP-listed
- The Grafton (1890), 1001–1020 E. 17th Avenue, Denver; NRHP-listed
- T. E. Swarz residence (1890), on Pearl Street between 10th and 11th Avenues, Denver; since demolished
- John C. Gallup residence (1891), at 1763 Williams Street, Denver; since demolished
- Worker housing, store, school, offices (1906) in Cokedale, Colorado, a coal mining company town; NRHP-listed as Cokedale Historic District
- Simon Guggenheim Hall, Boulder, at the University of Colorado at Boulder
