= La Fonda on the Plaza =

Historic hotel in Santa Fe, New Mexico

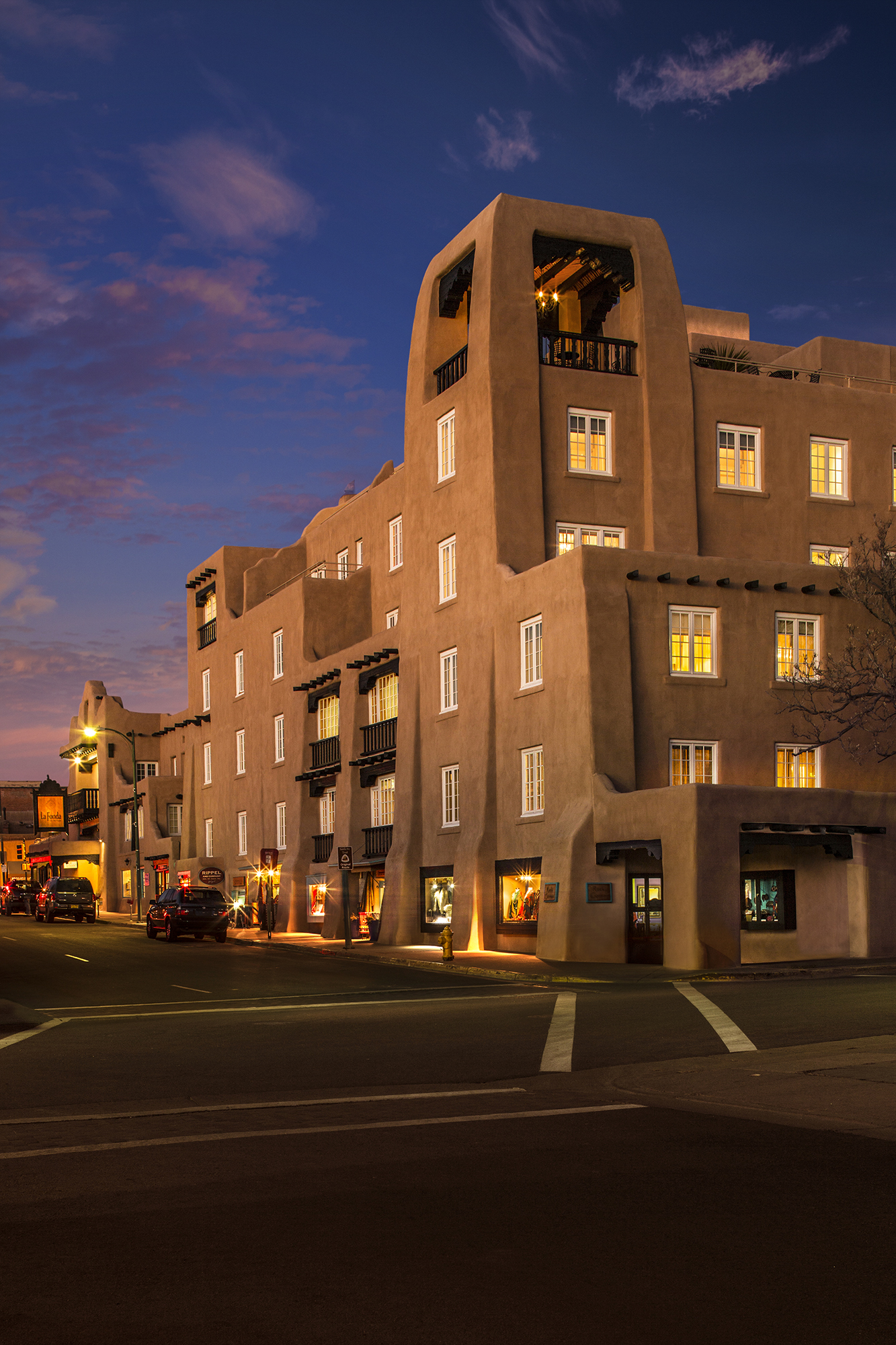
- View of the La Fonda hotel from the southwest
- Interactive map of the La Fonda on the Plaza area

General information
- Location: Santa Fe, New Mexico, 100 E. San Francisco Street
- Coordinates: 35.686650°N 105.937804°W
- Opening: December 30, 1922

Technical details
- Floor count: five

Design and construction
- Architect: Isaac Hamilton Rapp
- Developer: Santa Fe Builders Corporation

Other information
- Number of rooms: 180

Website
- www.lafondasantafe.com

La Fonda on the Plaza is a historical luxury hotel, located at 100 E. San Francisco Street and Old Santa Fe Trail in downtown Santa Fe, New Mexico adjacent to the Plaza. The hotel has been a member of Historic Hotels of America, a program of the National Trust for Historic Preservation, since 1991. La Fonda simply means "the inn" in Spanish, but the hotel has been described as "the grand dame of Santa Fe's hotels."

== History ==
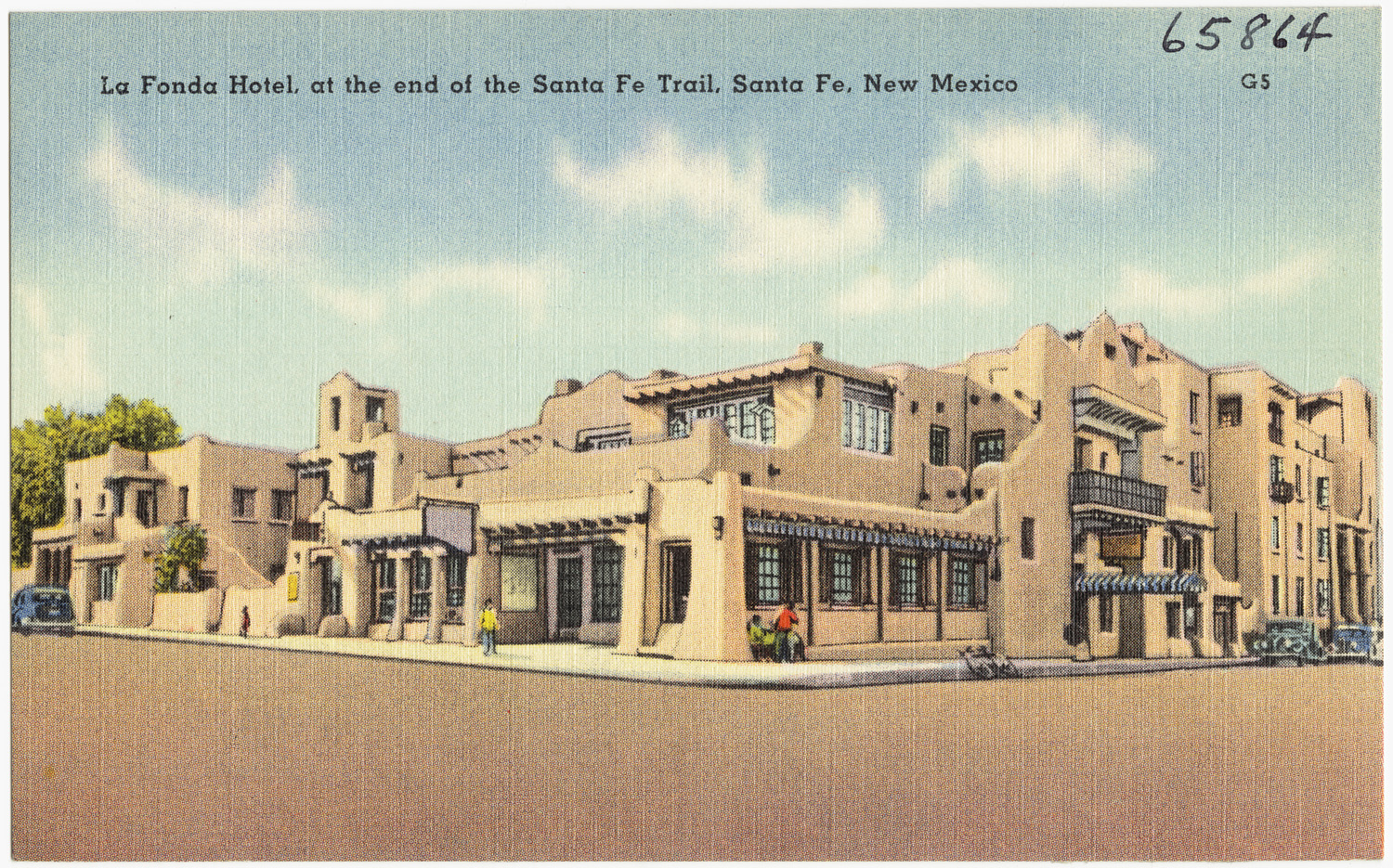
Vintage postcard featuring La Fonda

The site of the current La Fonda has been the location of various inns since 1609. It is on the El Camino Real de Tierra Adentro, which linked Mexico City to Ohkay Owingeh Pueblo and was the terminus of the 800-mile-long Old Santa Fe Trail, which linked Independence, Missouri to Santa Fe and was an essential commercial route prior to the 1880 introduction to the railroad. The Fred Harvey Company established La Fonda as one of its premier Harvey Houses.

An earlier construction of the hotel, called the United States Hotel but nicknamed La Fonda Americana by locals, burned down in 1912. In 1920, the Santa Fe Builders Corporations issue shares of stock to raise funds to build a new hotel. Architect Isaac Hamilton Rapp (1854-1933), the "Creator of the Santa Fe style" was chosen to design the new hotel in the Pueblo Revival style, which drew inspiration from the adobe architecture of indigenous Pueblo peoples of the region. The new hotel was hailed as "the purest Santa Fe type of architecture and ... one of the most truly distinctive hotels anywhere between Chicago and San Diego."

After its auspicious launch, the hotel closed temporarily in the 1920s, until it was purchased in 1925 by the Santa Fe Railway. The new owners commissioned local muralists to paint the interior walls, beginning La Fonda's longstanding support of local visual arts. Mary Colter redesigned the hotel's interior, setting a tone inspired by Spanish and Southwest Native American aesthetics that continues today. Her designs included exposed vigas, or ceiling beams, and Mexican tiles.

The Harvey Company promoted tourism in the Southwest and offered "Indian Detours," educational cultural tours to the Pueblos, beginning in 1926. The hotel continued as a Harvey House until 1969.

== Shops ==
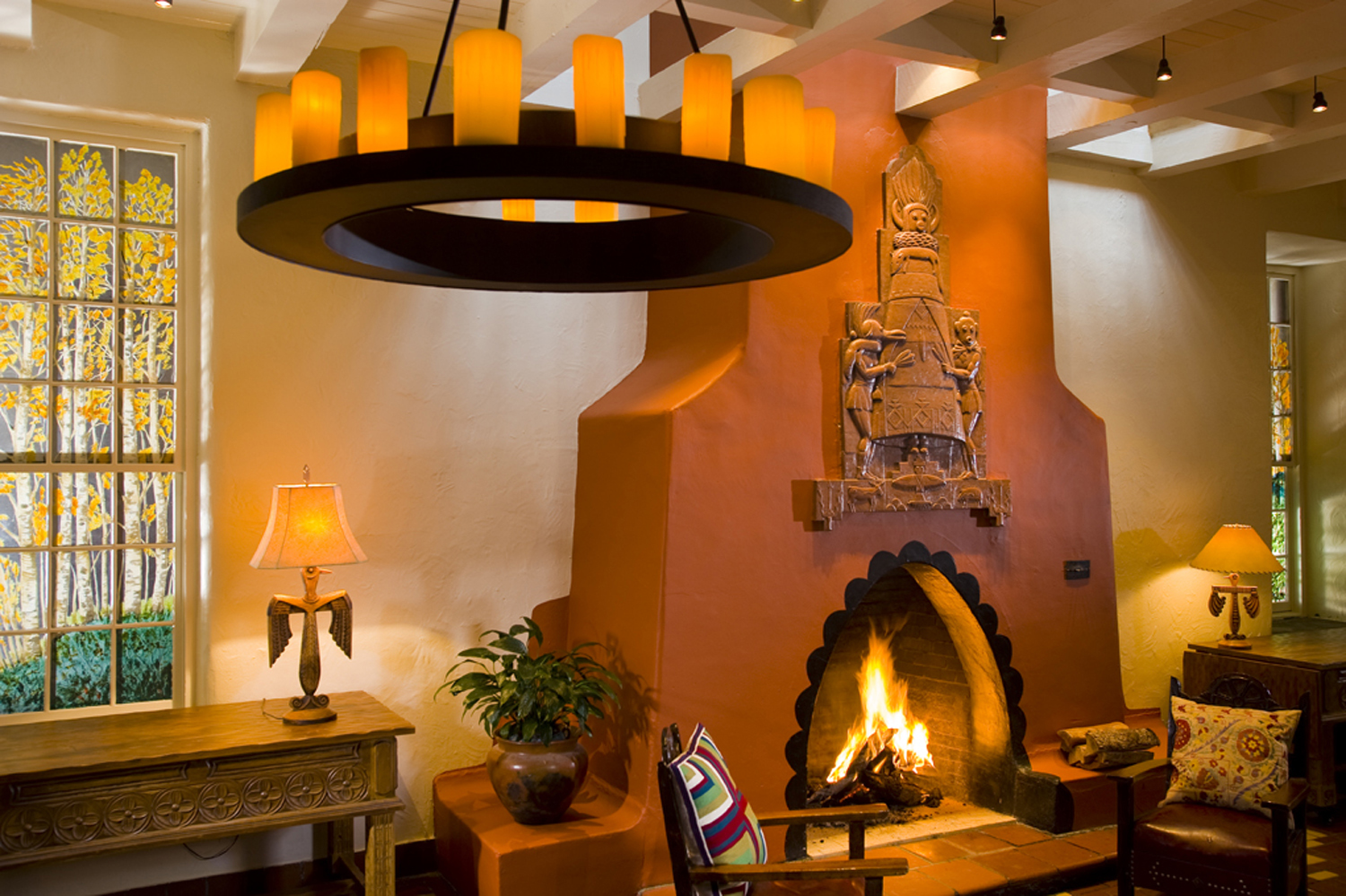
Lounge with fireplace designed by German-American artist Arnold Rönnebeck (1885–1947) in 1927, La Fonda

La Fonda on the Plaza houses many shops and galleries. In the 1930s, it was home to the Harvey Newsstand. Today, in addition to numerous boutiques, the hotel boasts La Fonda Newsstand and Senor Murphy Candymaker.

== Restaurants ==
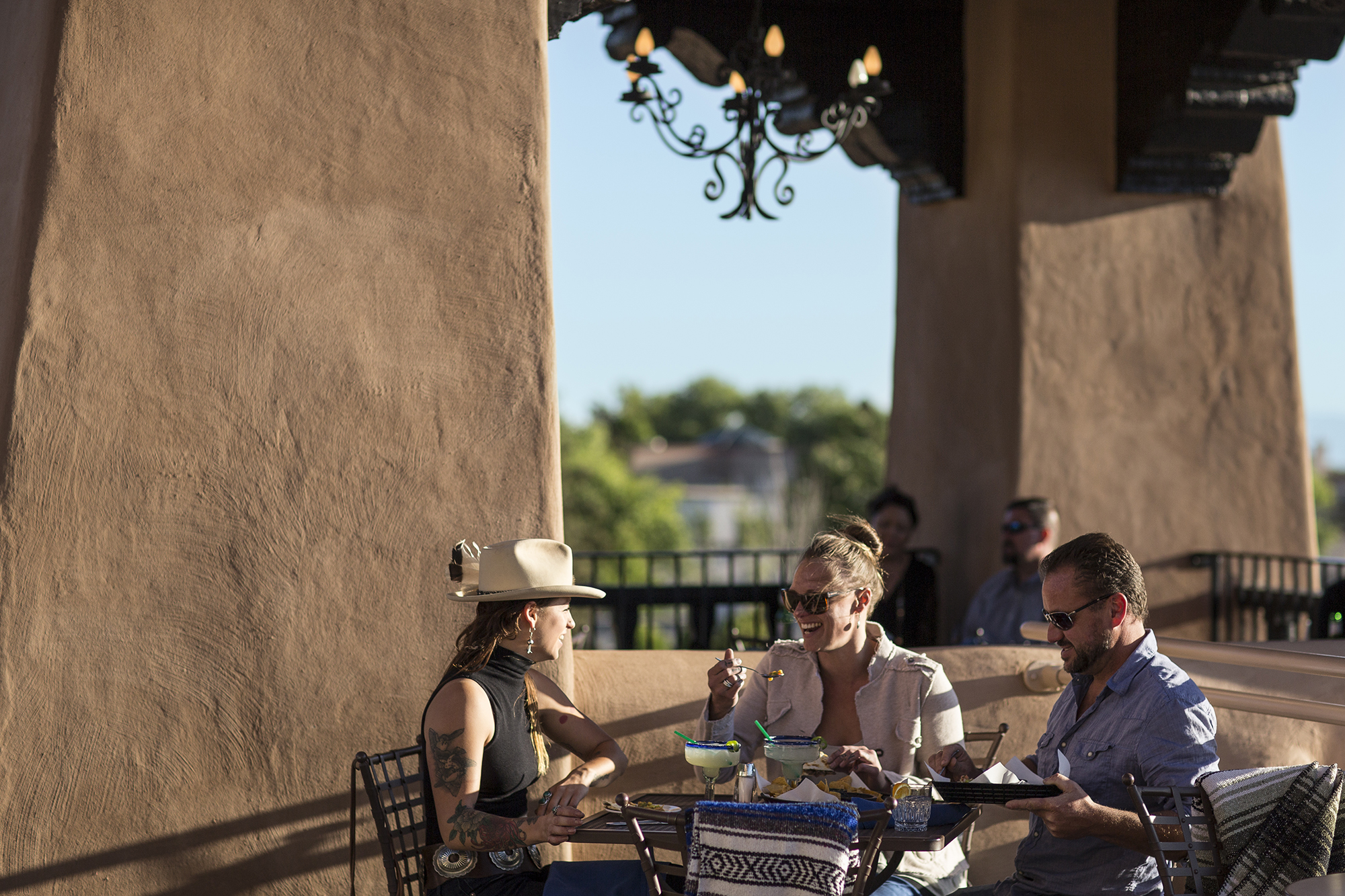
People dining at the Bell Tower restaurant, La Fonda

La Plazuela is a full-service restaurant serving inspired New Mexican cuisine, while the La Fiesta Lounge, a bar and restaurant, serves lunch and dinner. La Fiesta has live music and a dance floor. On the roof of the fifth floor is the Bell Tower Bar. On the street level is the eclectic gift shop, Detours at La Fonda and as well as many other shops, including the independently-owned French Pastry Shop and Restaurant, which serves breakfast and lunch.

== Awards and recognition ==
The hotel's art and historical tours, led by trained docents, won the Top HAT Award for "outstanding attraction" in 2015. Two staff members also received service awards.

== Movies and popular culture ==
Ride the Pink Horse, a 1947 film noir, was shot at the La Fonda. Season 1, episode 3, "Dueling Politicians; Nuclear Intel; Seattle Scammers" of the Travel Channel's Mysteries at the Hotel was shot at La Fonda.

One of the murderers in Patricia Highsmith's 1950 thriller novel Strangers on a Train stays at La Fonda as he plans one of the proposed 'swapped' killings.

== See also ==
- List of Historic Hotels of America
- Santa Fe Plaza
- Loretto Chapel
