= All Saints Episcopal Church (Denver) =

Historic church in Colorado, United States

- U.S. National Register of Historic Places
- Colorado State Register of Historic Properties
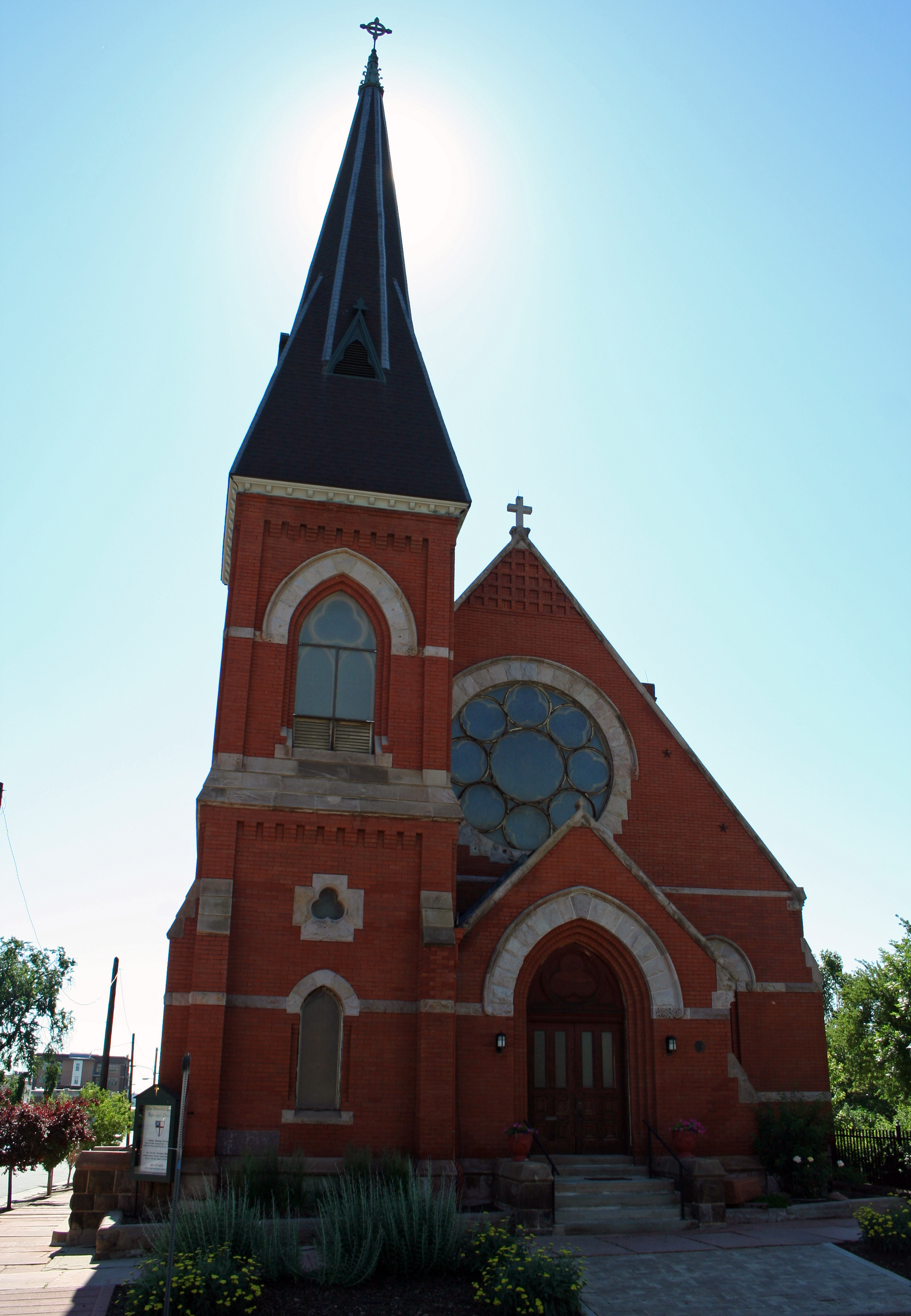

- Location within Colorado Location within the United States
- Location: 2222 W. 32nd Ave., Denver, Colorado
- Coordinates: 39°45′43″N 105°0′49″W
- Area: less than one acre
- Built: 1890
- Architect: Murdoch, James
- Architectural style: Victorian German Gothic
- NRHP reference No.: 78000839
- CSRHP No.: 5DV.132
- Added to NRHP: June 23, 1978

The All Saints Episcopal Church in Denver, Colorado, later known as Chapel of Our Merciful Saviour, is a historic church at 2222 W. 32nd Avenue. It was built in 1890 and was added to the National Register of Historic Places in 1978.

== History ==
The parish was organized in 1874. The building was built as the All Saints Episcopal Church, and is the second oldest Episcopal Church building in Denver.

=== 1999 Fiscal Year Restoration ===
The Bishop and Episcopal Diocese of Colorado applied for and received four state historical grants in the 1999 fiscal year (between July 1998-July 1999). The targets of these grants were to restore the pipe organ, stained-glass window protection, bringing the building up to current code, and improving neighboring lots. The total of these grants and matching funds was $200,000.

== Significance ==
It was deemed "significant both historically and architecturally. It stands today, virtually unaltered or changed since the day it was finished, as an excellent example of the small church designed to serve a parish of working class - lower middle class families. The building has added significance since it is the work of James Murdoch, an important architect in Denver in the late 19th and early 20th centuries."

== Exterior ==
The church was built in the Gothic Revival style and features a corner bell tower. The building was largely influenced by the German immigrants occupying the neighborhood at the time of its construction. Other notable exterior features are the rose stained glass window above the archway and the circular stone arches.

== Interior ==
Wooden statues, the pulpit, pews, and baptismal font are in their original form inside the chapel. The high beams of the ceiling are set in a herringbone pattern.

== Present Day ==
The church holds two services on Sundays, once in English and once in Spanish. The church has the Rev. Cesar Hernandez Gutierrez, a director for the Colorado Episcopal Church Latino/Hispanic Ministries, on staff.
