= Frank G. Bloom House =

Historic house in Colorado, United States

- U.S. National Register of Historic Places
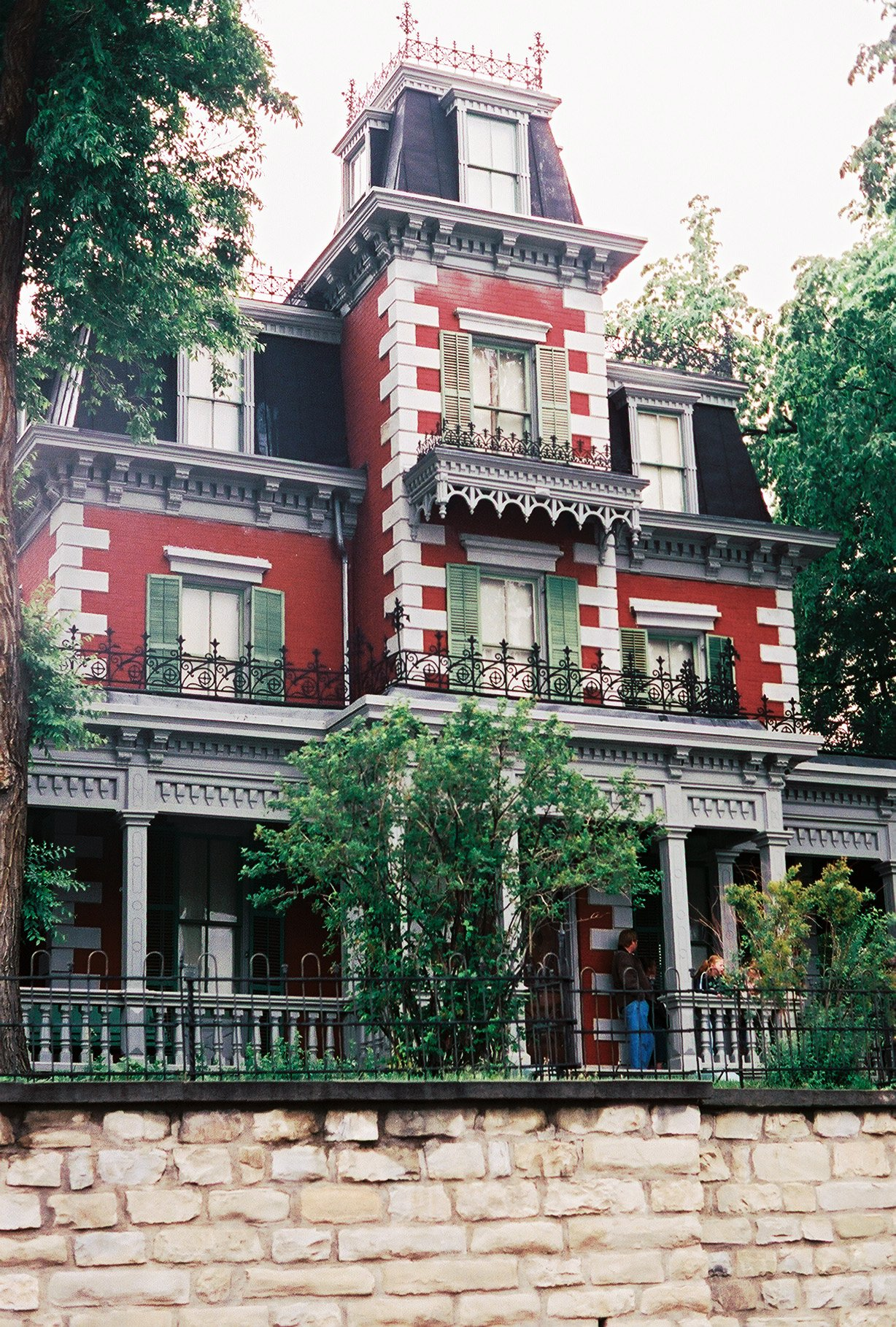
- The Frank G. Bloom House in Trinidad, Colorado is part of the Trinidad History Museum

- Location within Colorado Location within the United States
- Location: 300 block of Main St, Trinidad, Colorado
- Coordinates: 37°10′10″N 104°30′08″W
- Built: 1882
- Architectural style: Late Victorian, Rococo Victorian
- NRHP reference No.: 70000166
- Added to NRHP: February 26, 1970

The Frank G. Bloom House or Bloom Mansion is located in Trinidad, Colorado, United States, which is within Las Animas County. The Bloom Mansion is a late 19th-century building meant to serve as the personal residence of its owner. The mansion is located in Trinidad's 300 block of Main Street and has been on the National Register of Historic Places since 1970.

== History ==
Cattle baron and banker Frank Bloom and his wife Sarah had the mansion created in 1882. The building is constructed in a French style and used locally made bricks. The home is still decorated with an array of period furnishings including a horn chair and delicate porcelain figures.

== Trinidad History Museum ==
Today the home is part of the Colorado Historical Society's Trinidad History Museum. The museum, which is encompassed by the El Corazon de Trinidad National Historic District, features several homes in one block, including the Bloom House, the Baca House, which is next door to the Bloom Mansion, the Santa Fe Trail Museum, which features historic artifacts and exhibits about the Santa Fe Trail and Trinidad's heritage, and historic gardens around the properties.

== In cinema ==
- Badlands (film)

== See also ==
- Baca House and Outbuilding
- National Register of Historic Places listings in Las Animas County, Colorado
