= Frank Latuda House =

- U.S. National Register of Historic Places
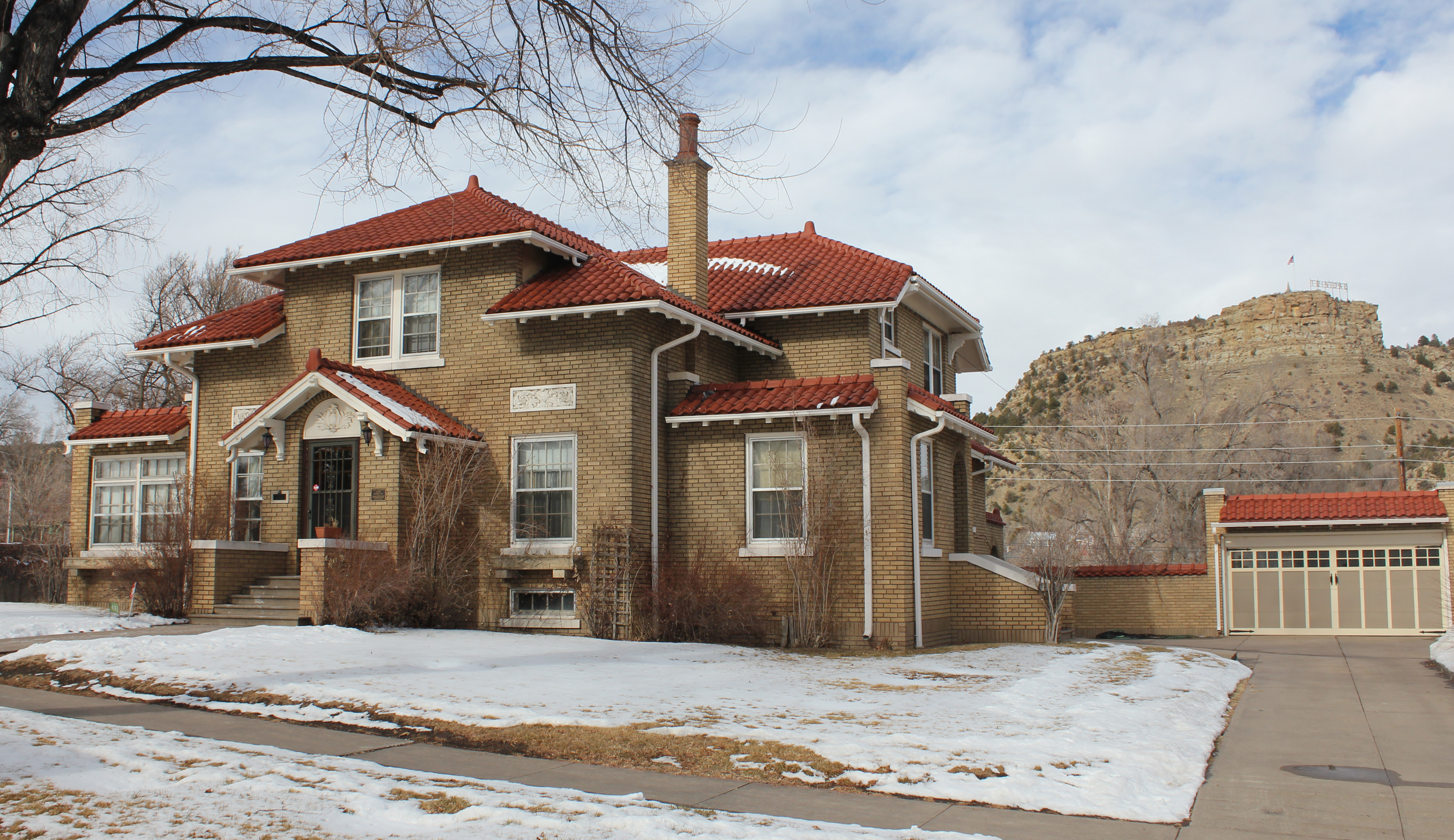

- Location within Colorado
- Location: 431 W. Colorado Ave., Trinidad, Colorado
- Coordinates: 37°10′31″N 104°30′47″W
- Area: less than one acre
- Built: 1925
- Architect: Issac Hamilton Rapp, et al.
- Architectural style: Mediterranean Revival
- NRHP reference No.: 09001275
- Added to NRHP: January 27, 2010

The Frank Latuda House, at 431 W. Colorado Ave. in Trinidad, Colorado, was built in 1925. It was listed on the National Register of Historic Places in 2010.

It was designed by architect Issac Hamilton Rapp and colleagues, in Mediterranean Revival style.

It was deemed significant "as an excellent example of a nearly twentieth-century distinctive Mediterranean Revival style house," and the only house in Trinidad of that style. Its Mediterranean Revival features include its "use of a red tile roof, subdued and limited application of ornamentation, a low-pitched hipped roof, arched entrances and light colored brick to contrast with the red tile roof."

The listing included a second contributing building, which is a compatibly-designed garage, and two contributing structures.

"With the two original unaltered buildings and two unaltered structures intact along with the garage’s original heating system intact and the house’s original interior woodwork, hardware, architect designed cabinets and built-in dressers, doors, light fixtures and kitchen sink intact, the Frank Latuda House retains a high degree of integrity of location, design, setting, materials, workmanship, feeling and association. Initially popularized by the 1915 Pan American Exhibition [apparently meaning the 1915 Panama–California Exposition ] in San Diego Mediterranean Revival style architecture became a prominent eclectic design in coastal cities of Florida and California."

It was also deemed significant in the state as "the only unaltered, intact Mediterranean Revival residence and garage known to exist in rural eastern Colorado." The only two other Mediterranean Revival style houses known to exist in rural eastern Colorado are the Petteys Mansion in Brush (state register #5MR.819) and the Hamerslough Residence in Trinidad (state register #5LA.2179.241). These others have lost historic integrity by dint of alterations and additions.
