= Chaves County Courthouse =

- U.S. National Register of Historic Places
- NM State Register of Cultural Properties
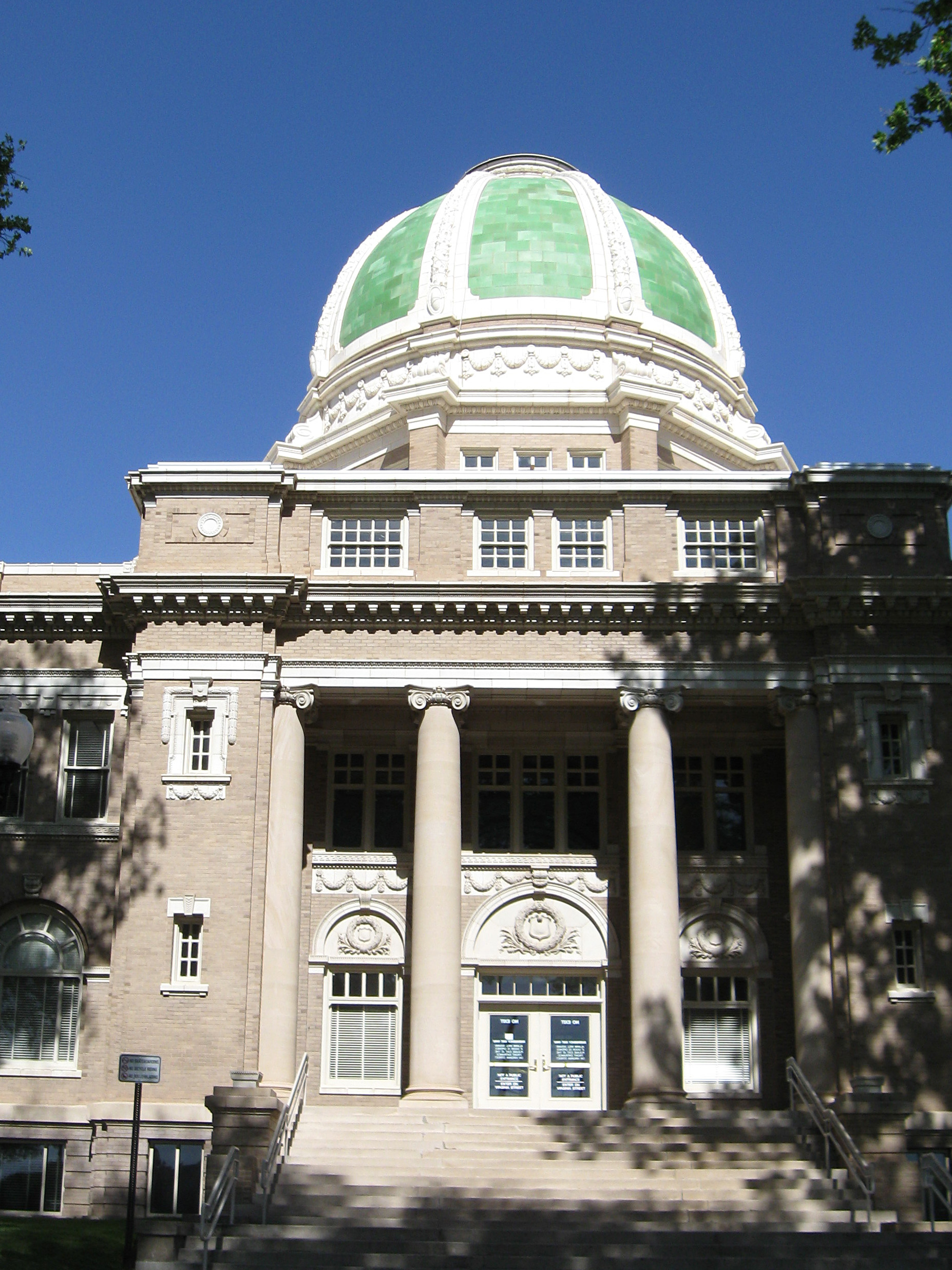
- West face of courthouse

- Location within New Mexico Location within the United States
- Location: 400 Blk. Main St., Roswell, New Mexico
- Coordinates: 33°23′49″N 104°31′17″W
- Area: 4 acres (1.6 ha)
- Built: 1911
- Built by: Lyon and Axtell
- Architect: Isaac Hamilton Rapp, Rapp & Rapp
- Architectural style: Colonial Revival, Federal, Georgian Revival
- MPS: County Courthouses of New Mexico TR
- NRHP reference No.: 87000892
- NMSRCP No.: 1019

Significant dates
- Added to NRHP: February 15, 1989
- Designated NMSRCP: June 8, 1984

The Chaves County Courthouse, located on the 400 block of Main Street in Roswell, New Mexico, is the center of government of Chaves County. The courthouse was built in 1911 after Roswell's citizens learned that New Mexico would become a state the next year. Isaac Hamilton Rapp, of the Colorado firm I.H. and W.M. Rapp, designed the courthouse in the "monumental civic" adaptation of the Beaux-Arts style. A cupola with green tiles tops the courthouse.

The courthouse was added to the National Register of Historic Places on February 15, 1989.

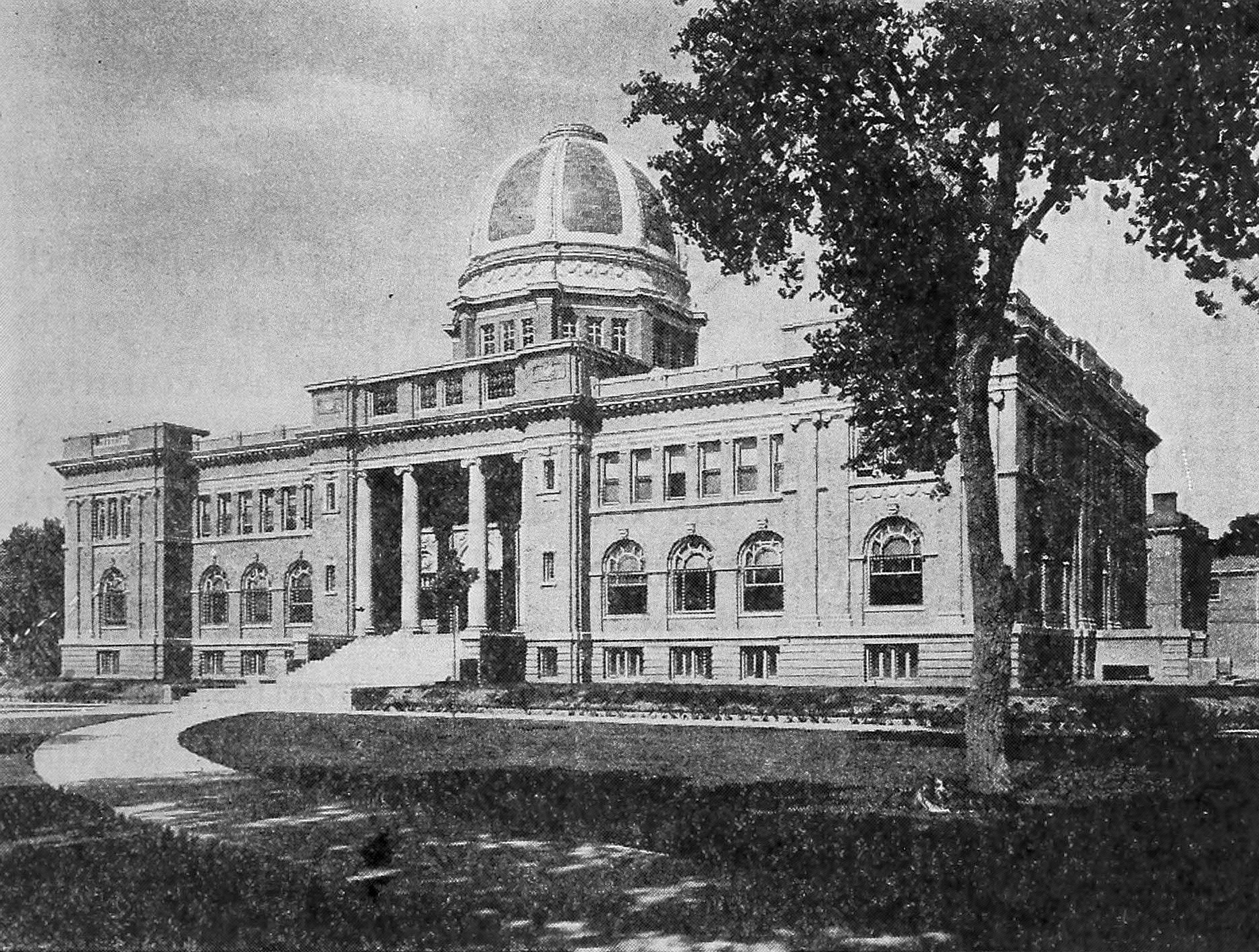
Chaves County Courthouse, 1920

== See also ==
- National Register of Historic Places listings in Chaves County, New Mexico
