= First Christian Church (Trinidad, Colorado) =

Historic church in Colorado, United States

- U.S. National Register of Historic Places
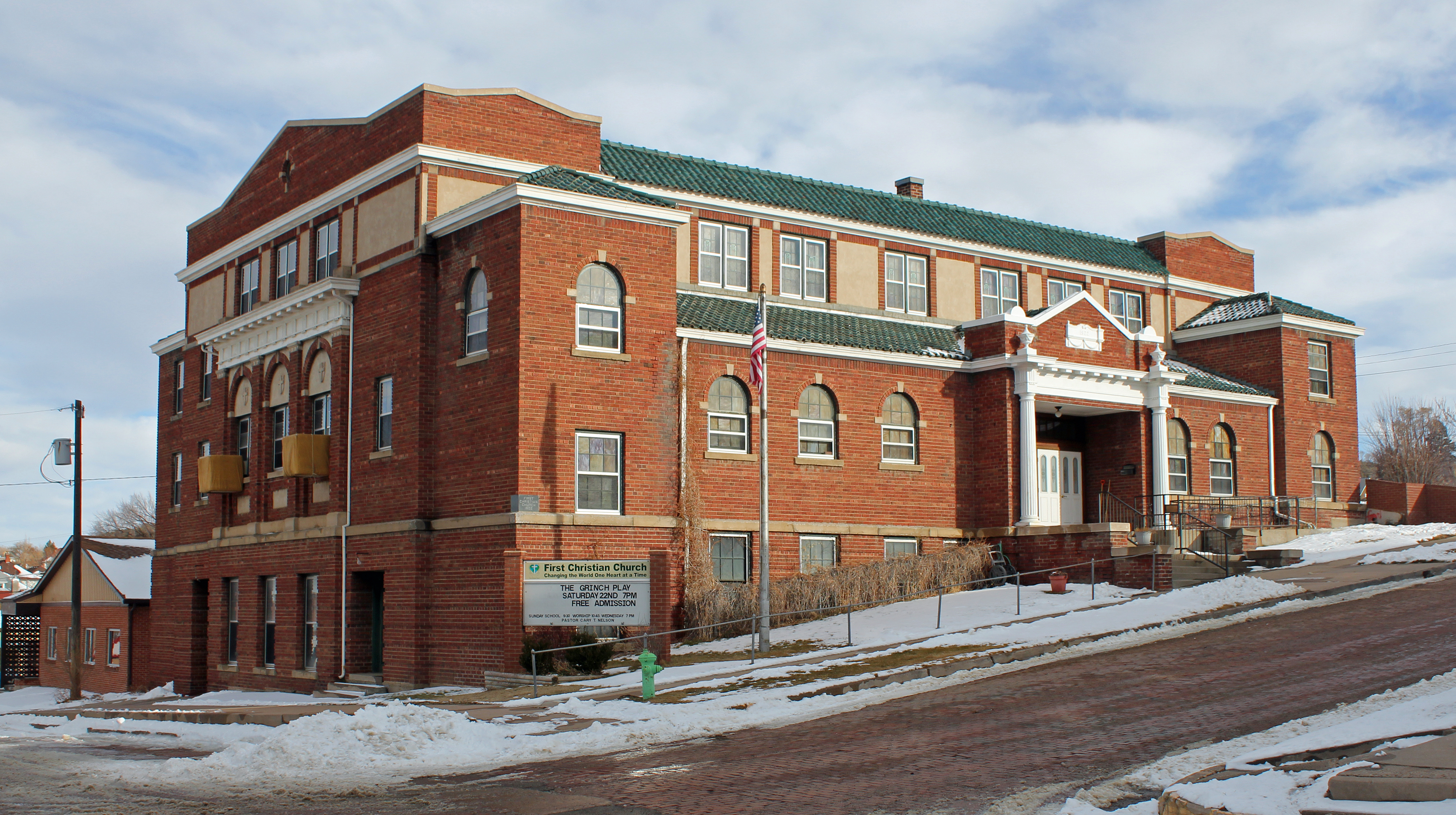

- Location within Colorado Location within the United States
- Location: 200 S. Walnut St., Trinidad, Colorado
- Coordinates: 37°10′08″N 104°30′02″W
- Area: less than one acre
- Built: 1922
- Architect: Isaac Hamilton Rapp; Arthur C. Hendrickson, et al.
- Architectural style: Mission/spanish Revival
- NRHP reference No.: 95001246
- Added to NRHP: November 7, 1995

First Christian Church (First Christian Community Church) is a historic church at 200 S. Walnut Street in Trinidad, Colorado.

It was built in 1922 and was added to the National Register in 1995.

It was designed by architects Isaac Rapp and Arthur C. Hendrickson.

According to its NRHP nomination, "The building is an interesting interpretation of the Mediterranean style by the prominent architectural firm of Rapp, Rapp & Hendrickson. It is one of the last buildings designed by the firm and illustrates the firm's breadth of architectural styles."
