= Earl School =

- U.S. National Register of Historic Places
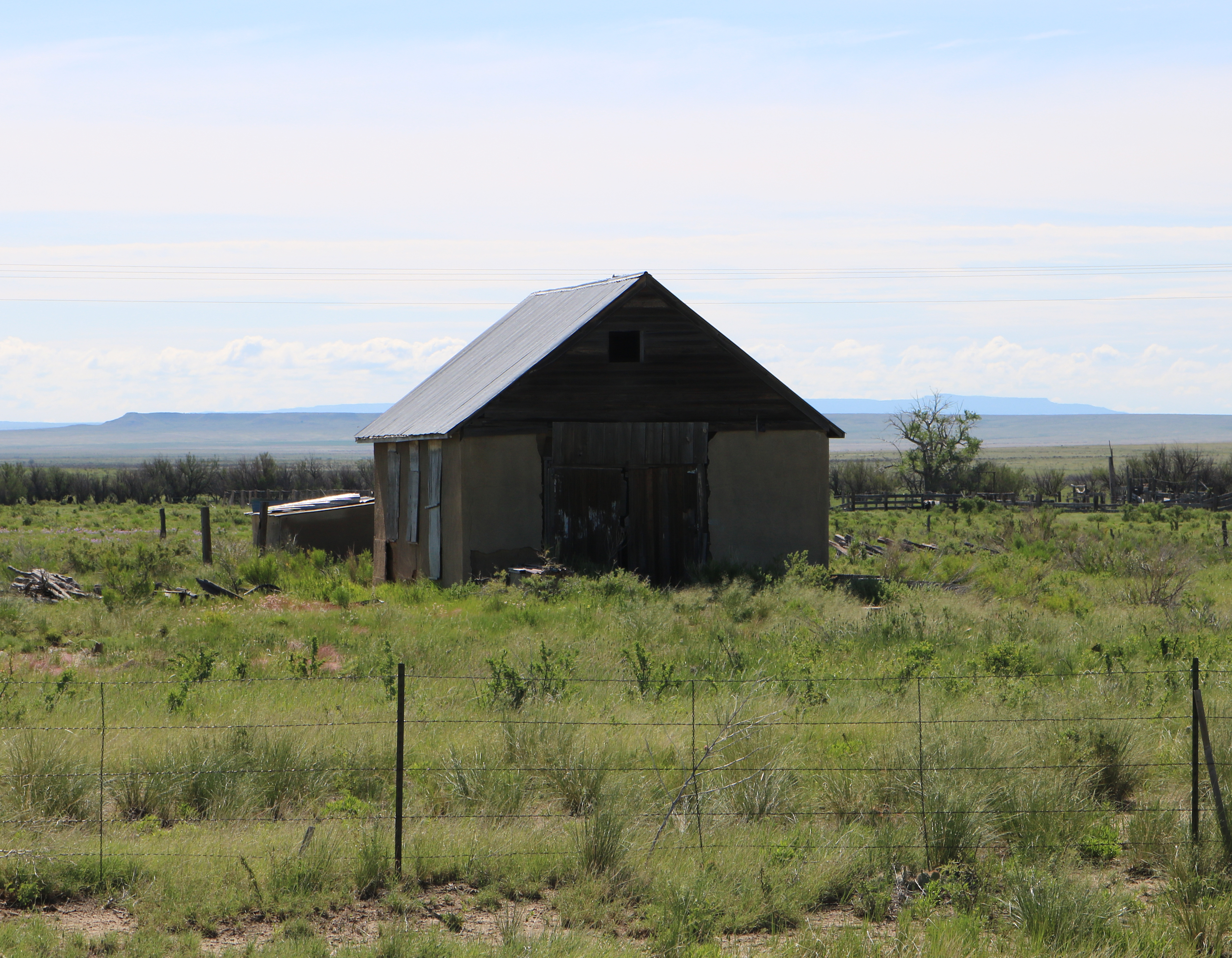
- School building in 2017

- Location within Colorado
- Nearest city: Earl, Colorado
- Coordinates: 37°19′49.46″N 104°16′41.03″W
- Area: 1 acre (0.40 ha)
- Built: 1909
- Built by: Peter Finn, Sr.
- Architectural style: Late 19th and Early 20th Century American Movements
- MPS: Rural School Buildings in Colorado MPS
- NRHP reference No.: 13000844
- Added to NRHP: October 23, 2013

The Earl School, near Earl, Colorado in Las Animas County, Colorado, was built in 1909. It was listed on the National Register of Historic Places in 2013. It is a rare example of a surviving building associated with rural black Americans in Colorado.

It was built by Peter Finn Sr. The listing included two contributing buildings on approximately 1 acre (0.40 ha).

The school's listing was consistent with standards set in a 1999 study, the "Rural School Buildings in Colorado Multiple Property Submission". The school and its site were deemed significant for its association with schooling in the area, for its architecture/engineering, and for potential for information to be discovered in the future, as might be discovered in an archeological dig at the site.

It served students for 37 years. Significantly, "African American students from a nearby African American farming colony and Hispanic students attended the school along with some Euro-American students."

The location of the school was not disclosed by the National Register when it was listed in 2013; it is recorded as "Address restricted" in the National Register Information System, as is generally done for archeological sites. The site, however, is described with photos by History Colorado online, including in 2017. It is visible off U.S. Route 350, at non-signed "Earl", between Model, Colorado to the north and the Trinidad Correctional Facility to the south.
