= Isaac Rapp =

American architect

Isaac Hamilton Rapp
- Born: 1854; Orange, New Jersey
- Died: 1933 (aged 78–79); Trinidad, Colorado
- Occupation: Architect
- Relatives: William M. Rapp, C. W. Rapp and George L. Rapp (brothers); Rapp Brush (nephew)
- Buildings: Colorado Supply Co. warehouse, Morley Colorado; New Mexico Museum of Art; Las Animas County Court House; New Mexico State Capitol Building

Isaac Hamilton Rapp (1854 – March 27, 1933) was an American architect who has been called the "Creator of the Santa Fe style." He was born in Orange, New Jersey.

Rapp learned his trade working for his father, a sometime architect and building contractor in Carbondale, Illinois. He left in 1887 and by 1889 had moved to Trinidad, Colorado where he joined with C.W. Bulger in establishing the architectural firm of Bulger and Rapp. The company dissolved after about five years at which point Rapp's brother William Mason Rapp moved to Trinidad and the firm of Rapp and Rapp was created. (This should not be confused with the architectural firm of Rapp and Rapp, noted for their theatre designs, composed of Isaac Rapp's two youngest brothers, Cornelius and George.) Eventually a third brother, Charles Rapp moved to Trinidad, but did not join the architectural firm.

The First Christian Church in Trinidad, built in 1922, was one of the later works by Rapp.

Isaac Rapp died in 1933 at his home in Trinidad, Colorado.

== Notable commissions ==
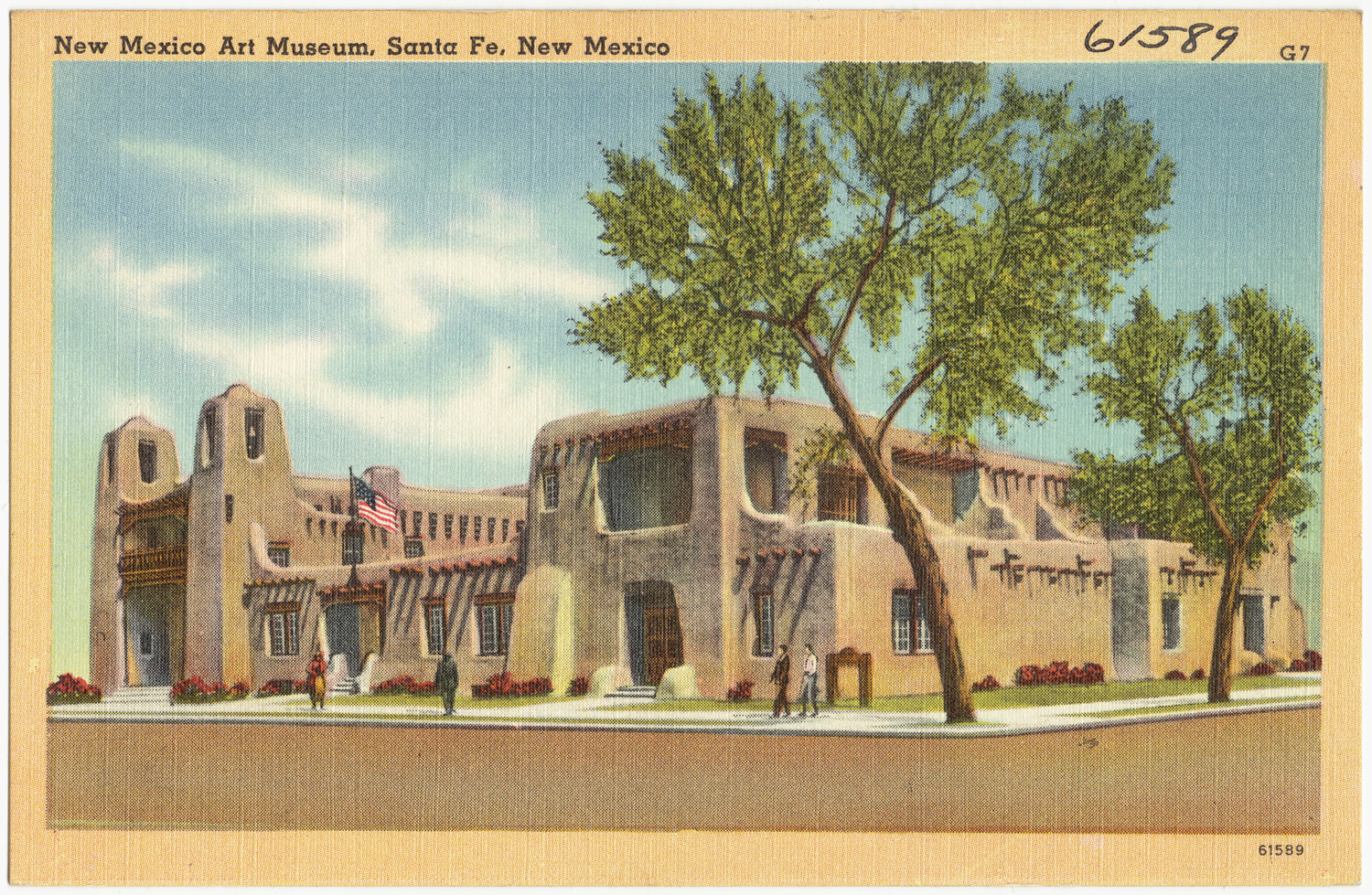
The New Mexico Museum of Art (1917), an early example of Pueblo Revival architecture.

All are in Santa Fe, New Mexico unless otherwise noted:

- Chaves County Courthouse, Roswell, Chaves County, New Mexico, 1911
- La Fonda Hotel, 1921–1922
- Las Animas County Court House, Trinidad, Las Animas County, Colorado, 1912
- New Mexico Building at the Panama–California Exposition, San Diego, California, 1915
- New Mexico Military Institute (multiple buildings), Roswell, beginning 1907
- New Mexico Museum of Art, 1917
- New Mexico State Building, Saint Louis World's Fair, St. Louis, Missouri, 1904
- New Mexico Territorial Capitol, 1900 (heavily remodeled)
- New Mexico Territorial Executive Mansion, 1908 (no longer extant)
- Gross, Kelly, and Company Warehouse, built in 1913, in the Santa Fe Historic District
- First Christian Church of Trinidad, Colorado, 1922
- Fox West Theatre, Trinidad, Las Animas County, Colorado, 1908
- Temple Aaron, Trinidad, Colorado, 1889
