= Jaffa Opera House =

- U.S. National Register of Historic Places
- U.S. Historic district – Contributing property
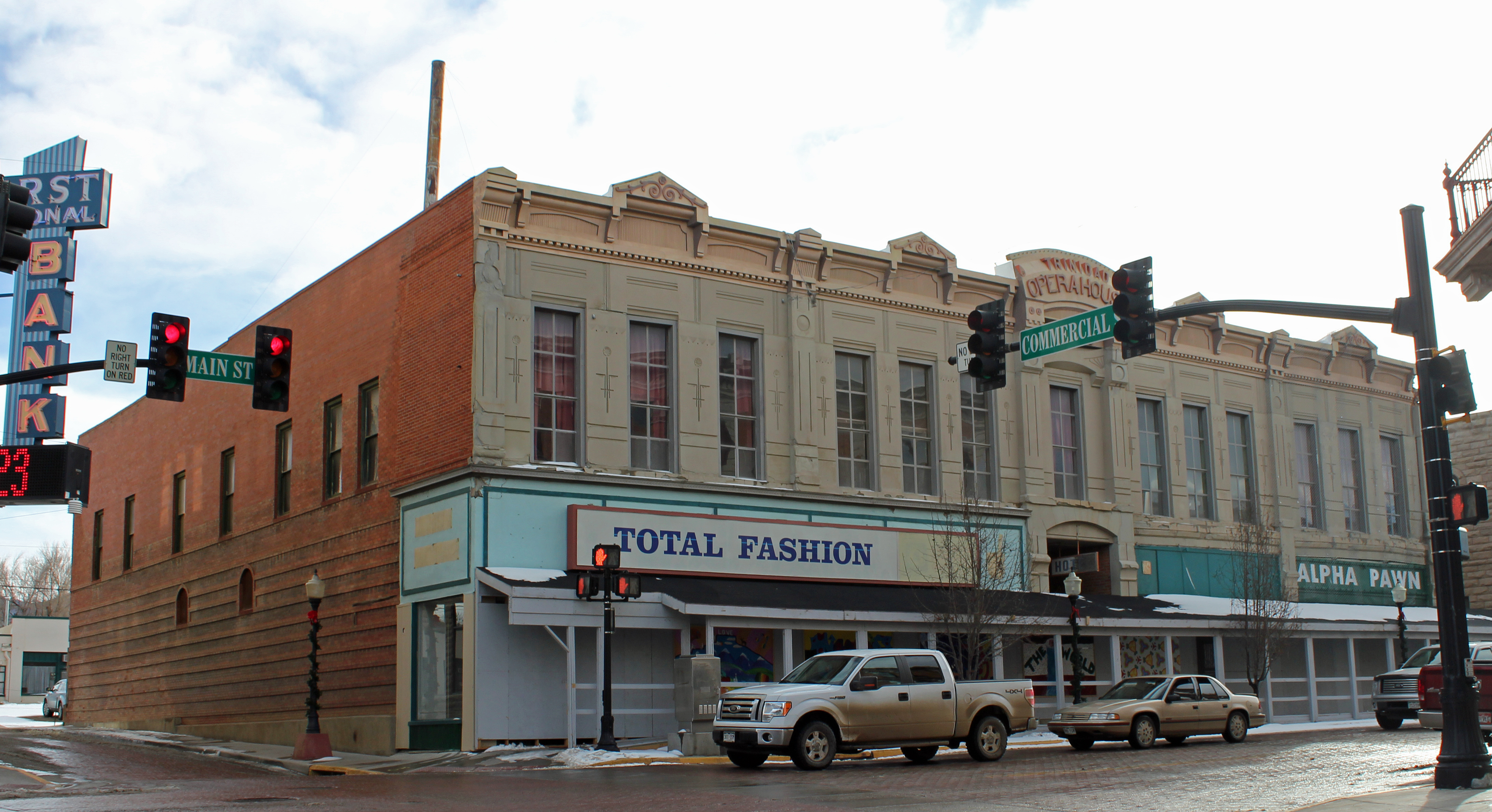
- Building in 2012. May 2018 Google Streetview very much the same, with building appearing vacant.

- Location within Colorado
- Location: 100–116 W. Main St., Trinidad, Colorado
- Coordinates: 37°10′05″N 104°30′19″W
- Area: 0.3 acres (0.12 ha)
- Built: 1883
- Architectural style: High Victorian Italianate
- Part of: Corazon de Trinidad (ID73000482)
- NRHP reference No.: 72000275

Significant dates
- Added to NRHP: February 7, 1972
- Designated CP: February 28, 1973

The Jaffa Opera House, at 100–116 W. Main St. in Trinidad, Colorado, was built in 1883. It was listed on the National Register of Historic Places in 1972.

It is Italianate, in fact High Victorian Italianate, in style. The first floor provided commercial spaces; the second floor provided a 710-seat opera house with a 45 by 20 feet (13.7 m × 6.1 m) stage and a 22 by 16 feet (6.7 m × 4.9 m) proscenium.

When listed in 1972, the main commercial space had been Hausman Drug Store for many years. Photo in 2012 and Google Streetview dated May 2018 show it apparently vacant. The 2011 Colorado earthquake damaged the opera house, and some experts recommended its demolition in 2011, but a community coalesced in opposition to that. A renovation project scheduled to be completed in 2019 was planned.

It is included as a contributing building in the Corazon de Trinidad historic district, National Register-listed in 1973.
