= Cokedale Historic District =

Historic district in Colorado, United States

- U.S. National Register of Historic Places
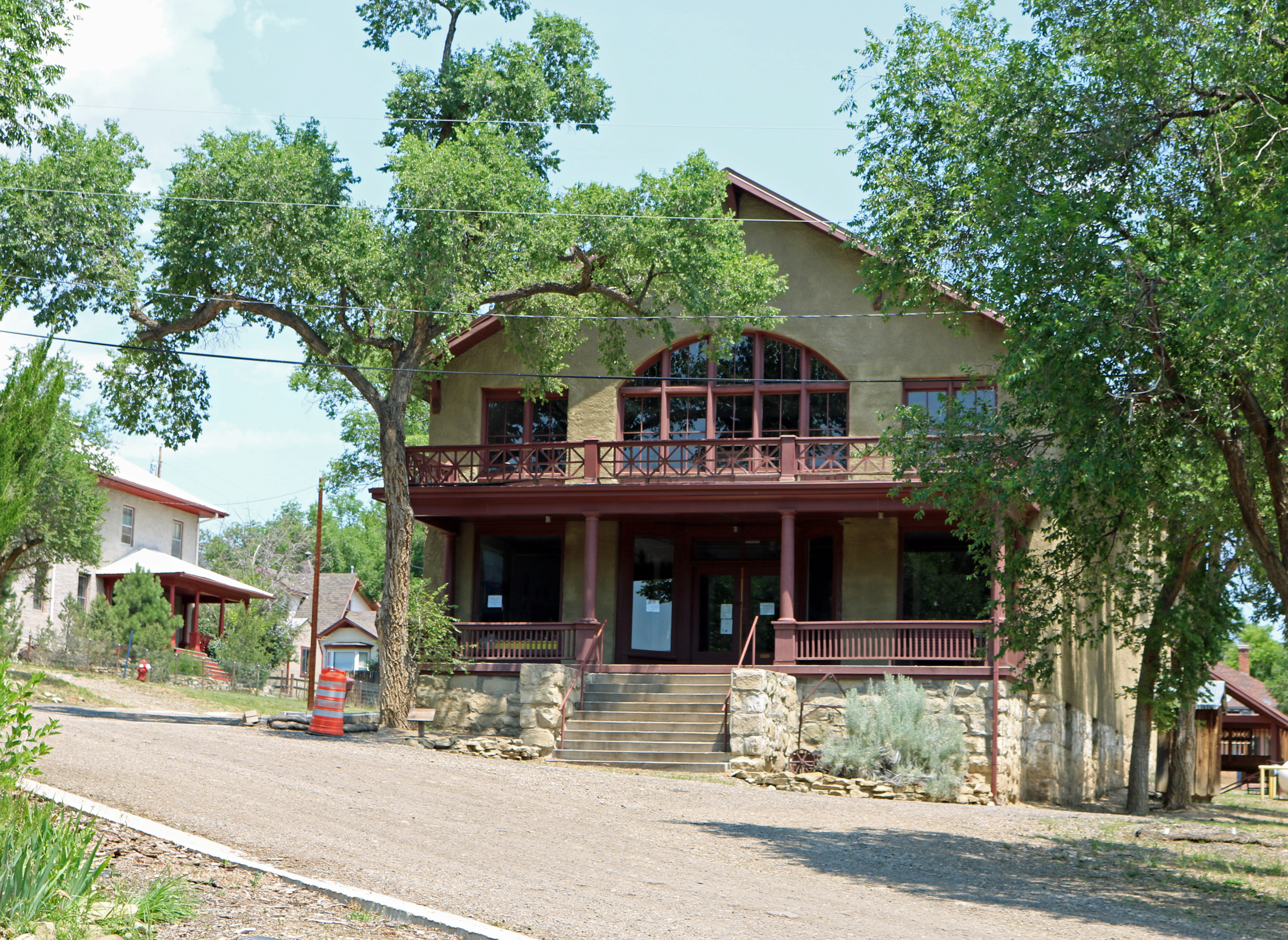
- Gottlieb Mercantile Building, the camp store building

- Location within Colorado
- Location: Roughly bounded by Church, Maple, Pine, Elm, and Spruce Sts., Cokedale, Colorado
- Coordinates: 37°08′32″N 104°37′10″W
- Area: 450 acres (1.8 km^{2})
- Built: 1906
- Architect: Murdoch, James
- NRHP reference No.: 85000083
- Added to NRHP: January 18, 1985

The Cokedale Historic District, in Cokedale, Colorado, is a 450 acres (1.8 km^{2}) historic district which is roughly bounded by Church, Maple, Pine, Elm, and Spruce Streets. It was listed on the National Register of Historic Places in 1985. The listing included 92 contributing buildings, seven contributing structures, and two contributing sites.

It was deemed significant as an example of a company-owned coal camp and for its association with the coal mining and coking industry in southern Colorado. Most other such coal camps were dismantled after World War I, but Cokedale continued to operate as a company town until 1947.

According to its NRHP nomination

It was long heralded as a "model" camp, with housing, educational and recreational facilities provided for its inhabitants by their employer, the American Smelting and Refining Company. Most of the houses and public and commercial buildings have survived essentially intact, with few contemporary intrusions, to become the most representative remaining such town in Colorado.

The town was built starting in 1906 by the Carbon Coal and Coke Company, a subsidiary of American Smelting and Refining Company. Denver architect James Murdoch designed workers' houses of 3, 4, 5, 6, and 8 rooms; a camp store; a boarding house; a school; and a mine office. Most buildings had sandstone foundations and walls of cinderblocks made from coke and cement. There was also a group of frame buildings.
