= 7-D School =

- U.S. National Register of Historic Places
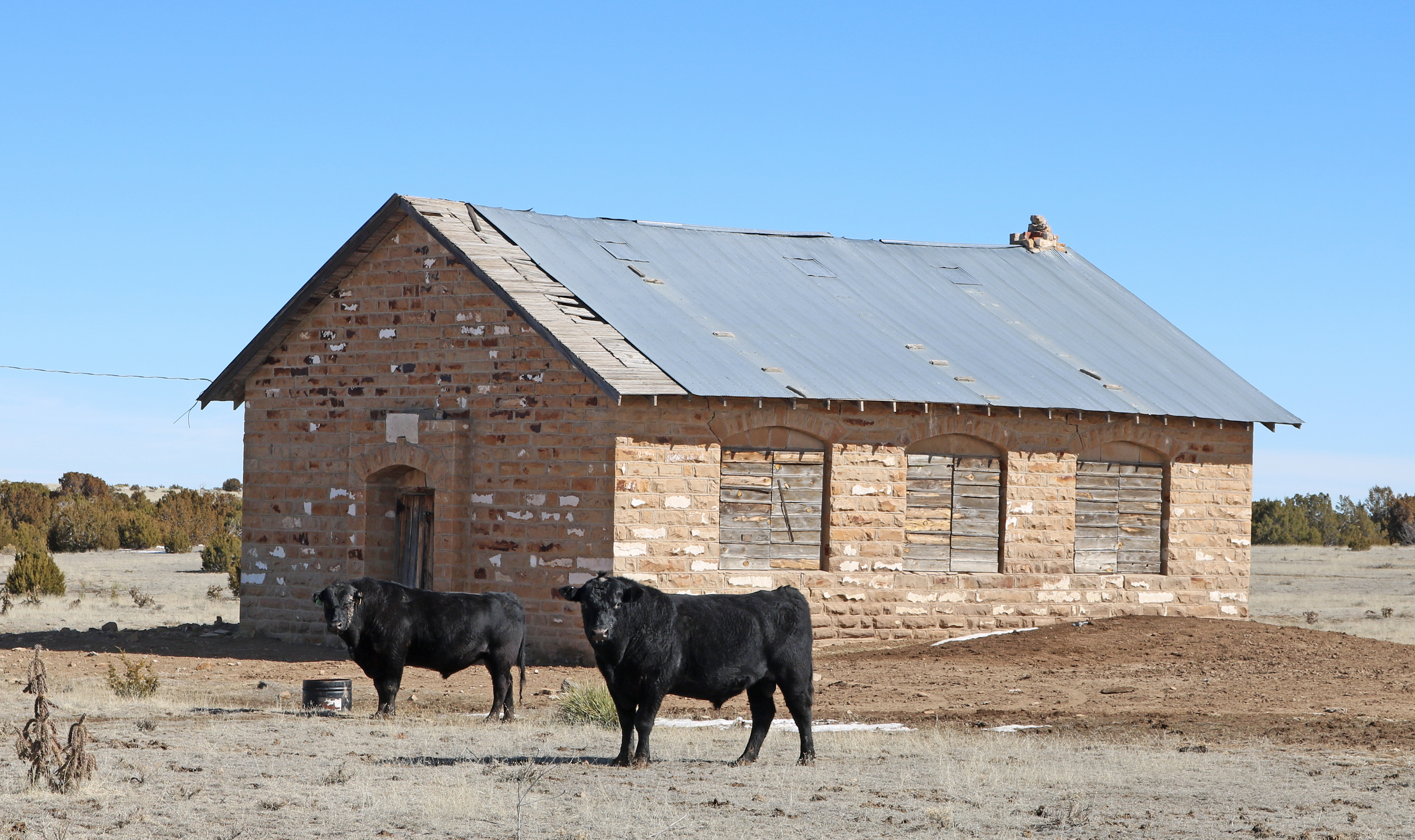
- The school in 2019.

- Location within Colorado
- Nearest city: Branson, Colorado
- Coordinates: 37°21′29″N 103°35′35″W
- Area: less than one acre
- Built: 1936
- Built by: Works Progress Administration
- Architectural style: Late 19th and Early 20th Century American Movements, WPA Rustic
- MPS: New Deal Resources on Colorado's Eastern Plains MPS
- NRHP reference No.: 09001120
- Added to NRHP: December 22, 2009

The 7-D School, in Las Animas County, Colorado, near Branson, Colorado, was built during 1936-37 as a Works Progress Administration project. It was listed on the National Register of Historic Places in 2009.

It is located on County Road 171 north of County Road 50.6.

According to HistoryColorado,

The 7-D School, constructed in 1936 to 1937 under the Works Progress Administration (WPA) is significant for its association with President Franklin Roosevelt’s New Deal legislative agenda to rescue the United States from the Great Depression. The School presents an important record of the federal relief programs administered in Colorado’s Eastern Plains during the Great Depression. Though the dire economic conditions of the Depression affected all of Colorado, drought and dust storms hit the agricultural-based economy of the Eastern Plains especially hard. The construction of the school provided much-needed employment in an isolated, rural area of Las Animas County where little other work was available. Additionally, the 7-D School is a good example of WPA Rustic architecture applied to a simple, one-room school building. The stonework displays the labor-intensive hand-craftsmanship that typifies the work of the WPA in southeastern Colorado. This craftsmanship is particularly characteristic of projects from rural Las Animas County since there was little access to construction machinery or pre-fabricated materials, but many local stone quarries.

And,

The 7-D School is also important for educating rural schoolchildren for many years. The school is an excellent example of WPA efforts to improve rural education facilities in eastern Las Animas County. This building, reflects WPA efforts to improve education and to help small communities with limited resources.
