= Earl, Colorado =

Unincorporated community in Las Animas County, Colorado, United States

- Unincorporated community
- Location of Earl, Colorado. Earl (Colorado)
- Coordinates: 37°20′06″N 104°16′42″W
- Country: United States
- State: Colorado
- County: Las Animas

Government
  - Type: Unincorporated community
  - Body: Las Animas County
- Elevation: 5,686 ft (1,733 m)
- Time zone: UTC−07:00 (MST)
  - Summer (DST): UTC−06:00 (MDT)
- ZIP code: (Model) 81059
- Area code: 719
- GNIS place ID: 194589

Earl is an unincorporated community in Las Animas County, Colorado, United States.

== History ==
The Earl, Colorado, post office operated from July 31, 1895, until December 15, 1923. The Model, Colorado, post office (ZIP code 81059) now serves the area.

The community most likely bears the name of an early settler.

The Earl School, built in 1909 and apparently a rural schoolhouse, survives and was listed on the National Register of Historic Places in 2013.

== See also ==
- List of populated places in Colorado
