= Corazon de Trinidad =

- U.S. National Register of Historic Places
- U.S. Historic district
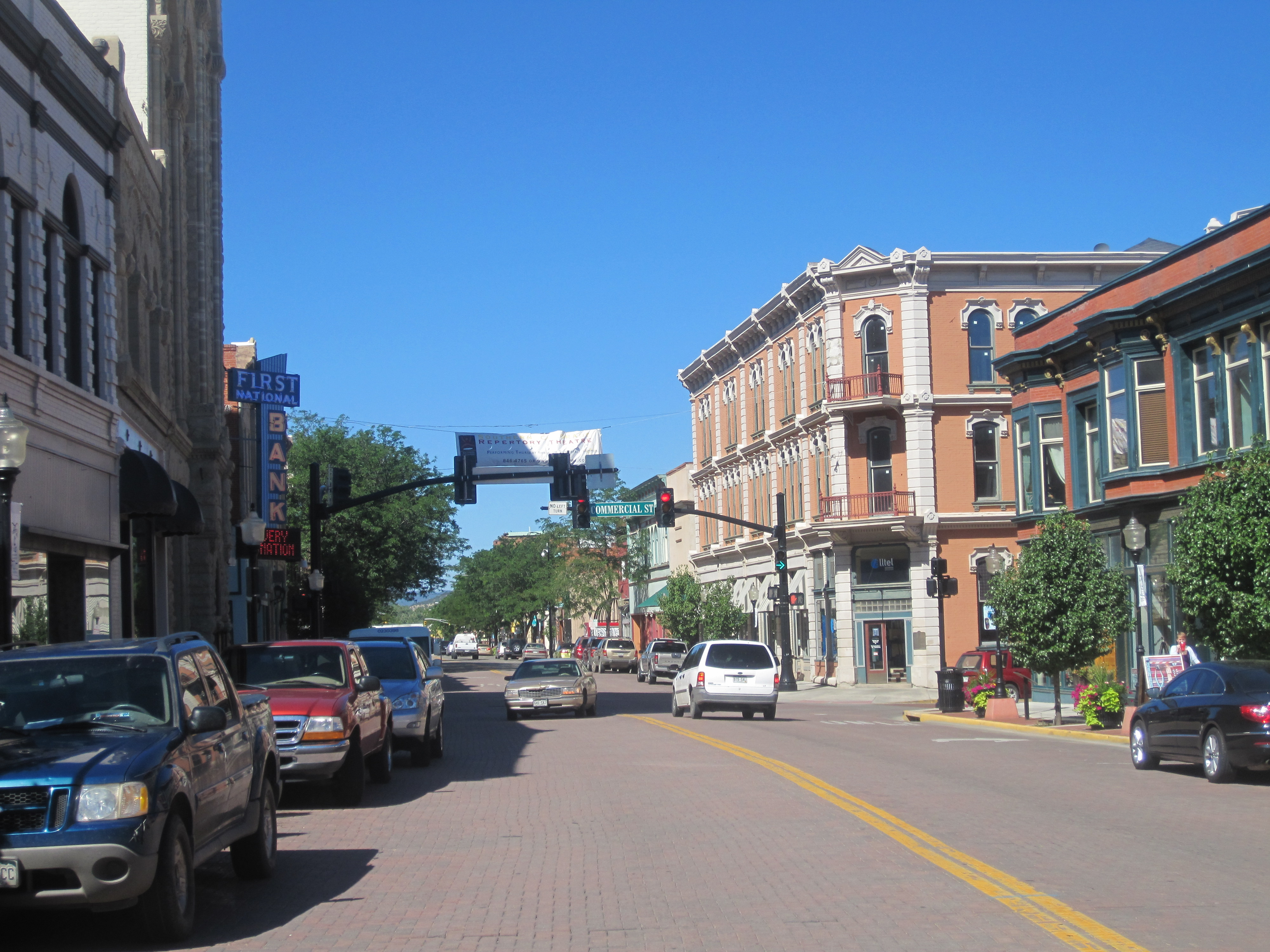
- Downtown, with Columbian Hotel on the right, in 2010

- Location within Colorado
- Location: Roughly bounded by the Purgatoire River on the north and west, Walnut St. on the east, and 3rd, W. 1st and Animas Sts. on the south, Trinidad, Colorado
- Coordinates: 37°10′07″N 104°30′20″W
- Area: 132 acres (0.53 km^{2})
- Built by: Multiple
- Architect: Multiple
- Architectural style: Late Victorian, other
- NRHP reference No.: 73000482
- Added to NRHP: February 28, 1973

The Corazon de Trinidad is a historic district in Trinidad, Colorado which was listed on the National Register of Historic Places in 1973.

The district is a 132 acres (53 ha) area roughly bounded by the Purgatoire River on the north and west, Walnut St. on the east, and 3rd, W. 1st and Animas Sts. on the south.

It includes approximately 50 contributing buildings including some or all of:

- Columbian Hotel (1880), hotel of about 100 rooms, opened as the "Grand Union Hotel" and renamed in the mid-1890s. Designed, built, owned by John Conkie.
- Jaffa Opera House (1883), separately NRHP-listed
- Toltec Hotel (1911), 100 block of N. Commercial, construction supervised by F.E. Edbrooke Architectural Company
- Donnelly Building (1900)
- First National Bank Building (1892), Richardsonian Romanesque, the tallest building in the downtown area
- Main Hotel (1900), built of brick and Trinidad Sandstone
- Colorado Building, 132 E. Main St., also known as Masonic Temple

A detailed survey of buildings, in text and historic plus then-current photos, appears in the 1970 manuscript "The Historic Buildings of Central Trinidad", by Willard C. Louden, which concludes with an essay by Langdon Morris calling for appropriate historic preservation.

The National Register listing in effect endorses the general assertions of historic association and significance of the central Trinidad buildings in the 1970 manuscript, as the "significance" section of the nomination simply states "see the attached".

Some buildings documented in the manuscript may not actually be included in the approved historic district. Maps defining the district and identifying condition of structures in 1970, approval documents, and correspondence between Trinidad and National Park Service officials, are included in National Archives and Records Administration-preserved documentation for the listing. It was noted that the original submission included deficiency with respect to mapping but there was urgency with respect to some possible funding, and the National Register's Keeper of the Register William J. Murtagh signed off with note "This looks like a decent district although I don't quite understand why they've marked certain buildings outside the district as of prime importance."

The name of the district, meaning "The Heart of Trinidad", was determined by a competition.
