= Trinidad History Museum =

Coordinates: 37.1695°N 104.5026°W

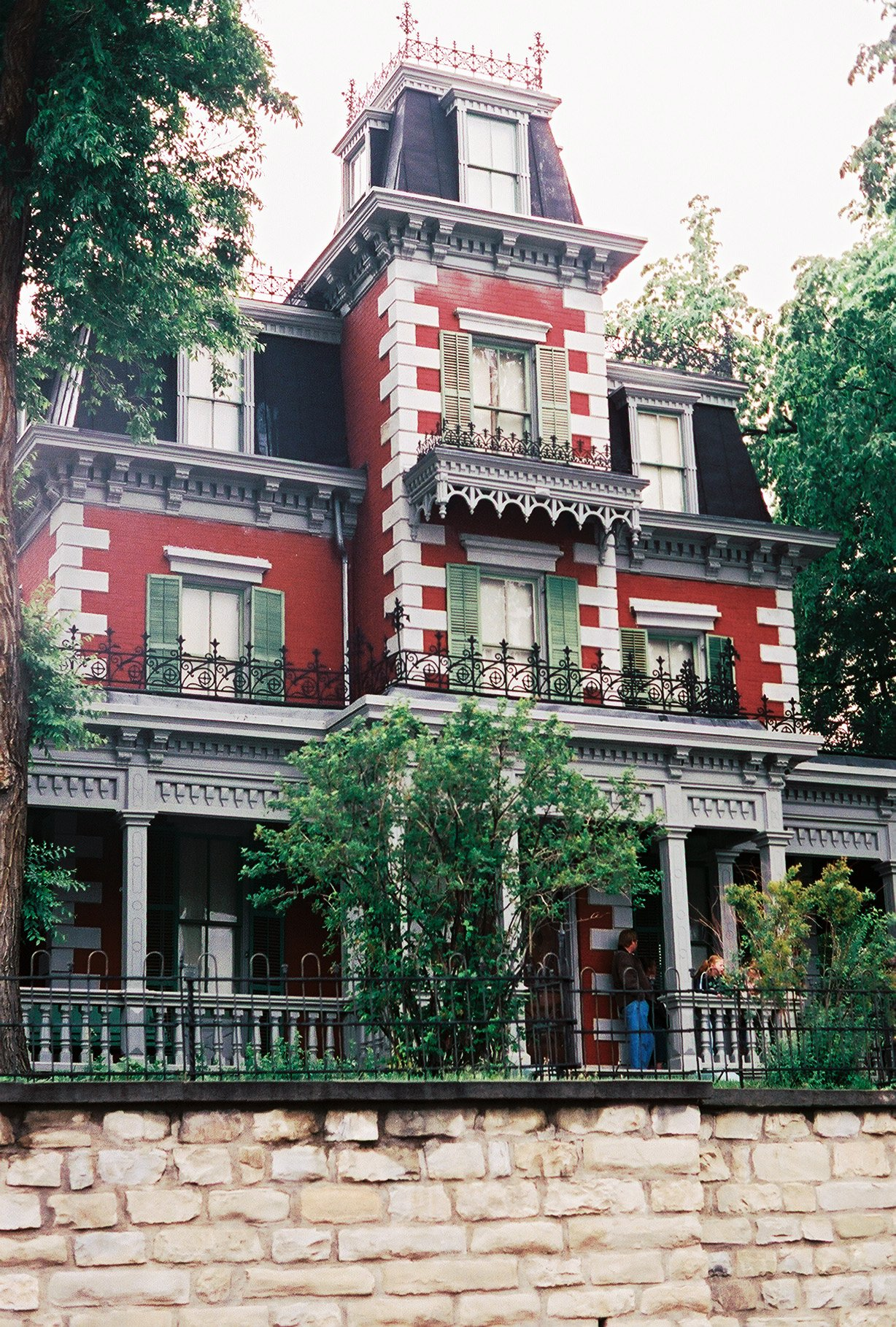
The Bloom Mansion, part of the Trinidad History Museum.

Trinidad History Museum is a local history museum in Trinidad, Colorado, United States. It is administered by History Colorado (the Colorado Historical Society).

== Description ==
The museum presents the history of the town of Trinidad and the surrounding area in southeastern Colorado. It features a number of attractions on one block in the historic district of Trinidad. These include historic homes, gardens, and local treasures. The museum includes the Santa Fe Trail in its remit since the trail passes through the southeast corner of Colorado. It features several components including the Santa Fe Trail Museum, Baca House and Kitchen Garden, and Bloom Mansion and Heritage Gardens.
