= Cokedale, Colorado =

Town in Colorado, US

- Statutory town
- Town of Cokedale
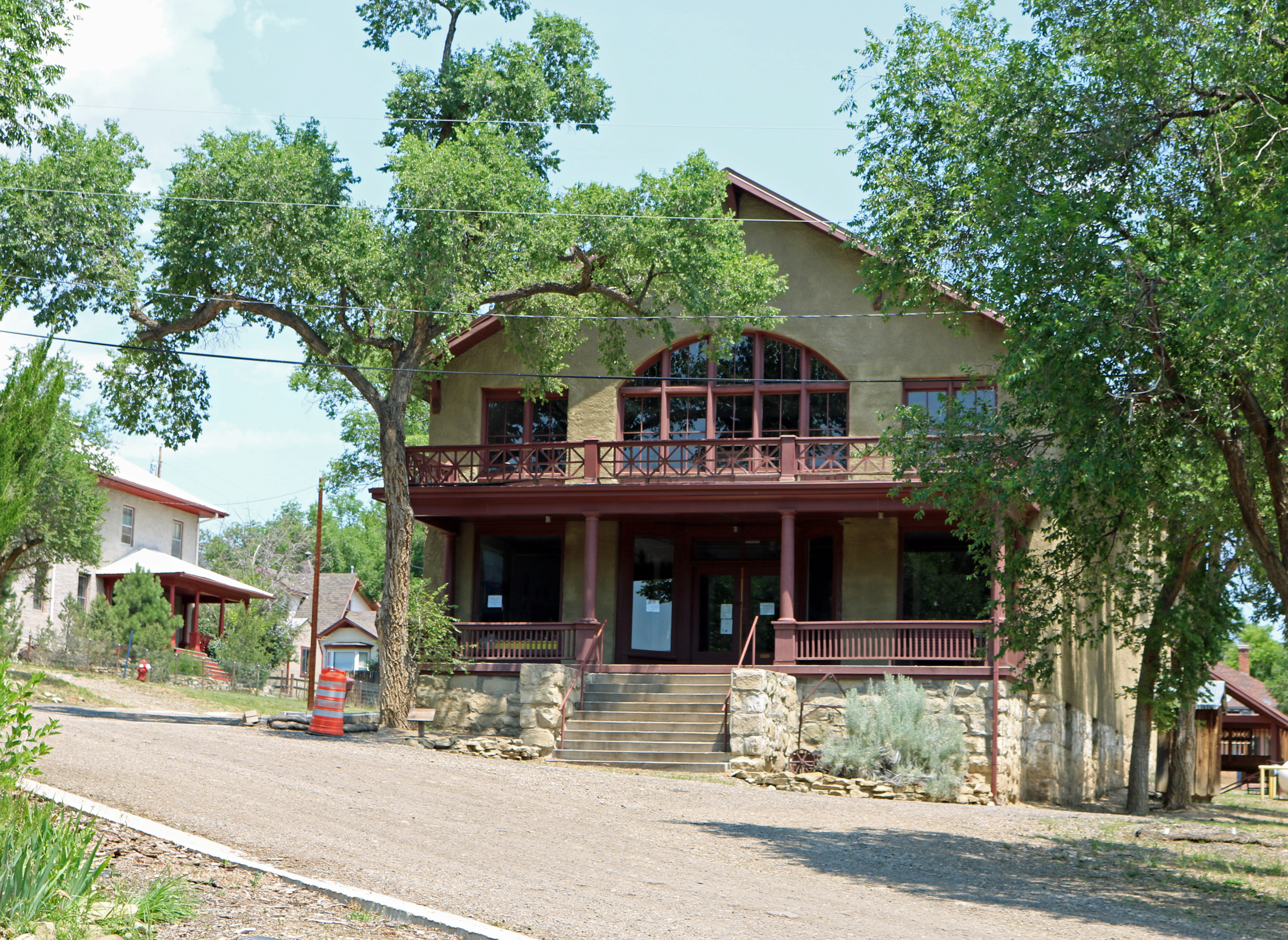
- The old Gottlieb Mercantile Building, which now houses the town hall, the post office, and the Cokedale Mining Museum.

- Location of the Town of Cokedale in the Las Animas County, Colorado
- Coordinates: 37°08′39″N 104°37′27″W
- Country: United States
- State: Colorado
- County: Las Animas
- Incorporated: March 15, 1948

Government
  - Type: Statutory town

Area
  - Total: 0.205 sq mi (0.531 km^{2})
  - Land: 0.205 sq mi (0.531 km^{2})
  - Water: 0 sq mi (0.000 km^{2})
- Elevation: 6,319 ft (1,926 m)

Population (2020)
  - Total: 127
  - Density: 619/sq mi (239/km^{2})
- Time zone: UTC−07:00 (MST)
  - Summer (DST): UTC−06:00 (MDT)
- ZIP code: Trinidad CO 81082
- Area code: 719
- GNIS town ID: 2413221
- FIPS code: 08-15550
- Website: townofcokedale.colorado.gov

Cokedale is a statutory town located in Las Animas County, Colorado, United States. The town population was 127 at the 2020 United States census.

== History ==
Cokedale is a former coal mining town. The Cokedale, Colorado, post office operated from December 26, 1906, until October 28, 1997. The Trinidad, Colorado, post office (ZIP code 81082) now serves the area. The mine shut down in 1947, but the Town of Cokedale was incorporated on March 15, 1948. The town was 5 miles away from the epicenter of a 5.3 earthquake on August 23, 2011.

Much of the town is included in the Cokedale Historic District, which is listed on the National Register of Historic Places.

== Geography ==
At the 2020 United States census, the town had a total area of 131 acres (0.531 km^{2}), all of it land.

== Demographics ==
Historical population
Census	Pop.	Note	%±
1950	214		—
1960	219		2.3%
1970	101		−53.9%
1980	90		−10.9%
1990	116		28.9%
2000	139		19.8%
2010	129		−7.2%
2020	127		−1.6%
U.S. Decennial Census

As of the census of 2000, there were 139 people, 62 households, and 40 families residing in the town. The population density was 685.0 inhabitants per square mile (264.5/km^{2}). There were 86 housing units at an average density of 423.8 per square mile (163.6/km^{2}). The racial makeup of the town was 89.21% White, 0.72% Native American, 7.19% from other races, and 2.88% from two or more races. Hispanic or Latino of any race were 43.17% of the population.

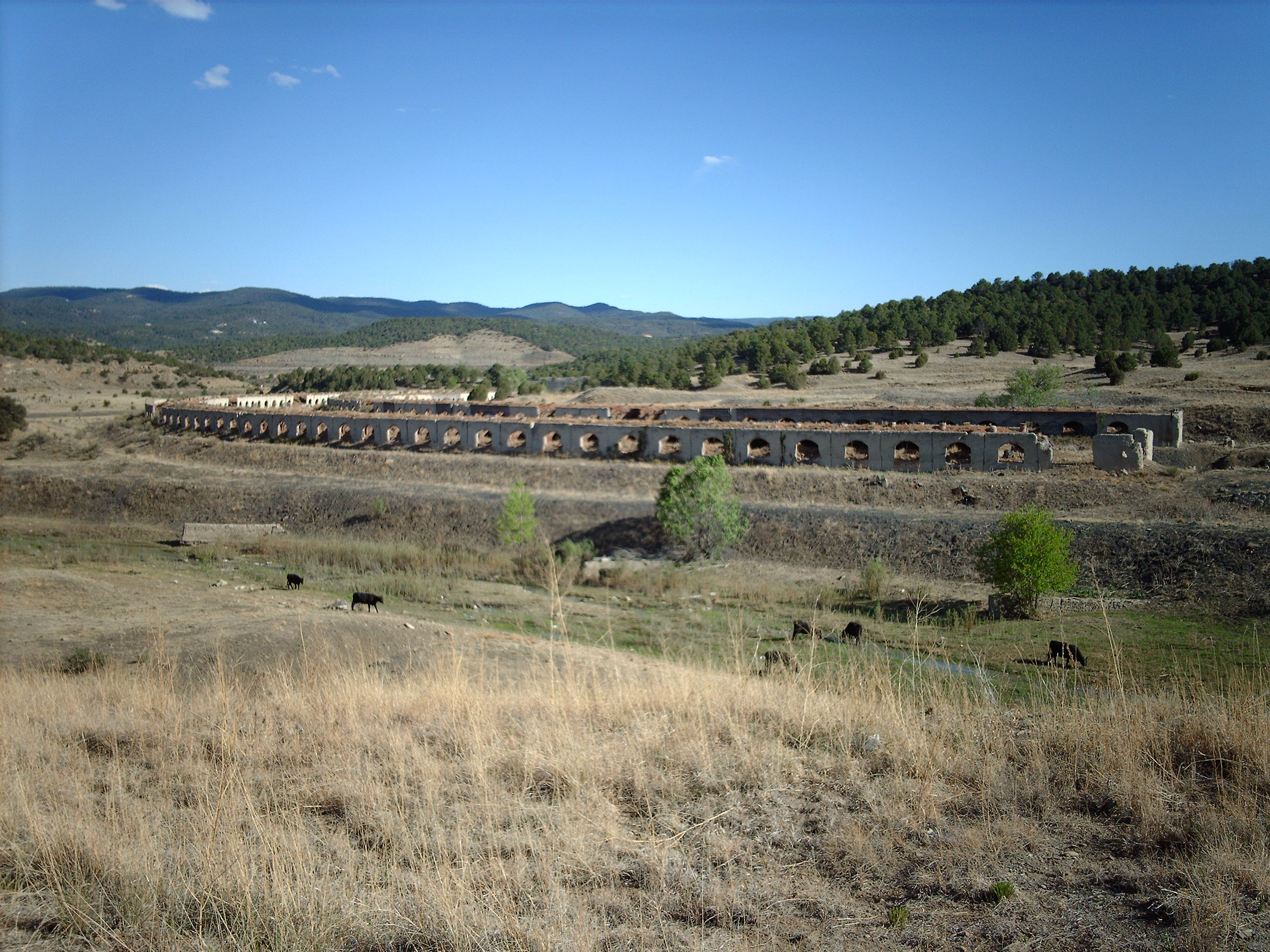
The Coke Ovens of Cokedale.

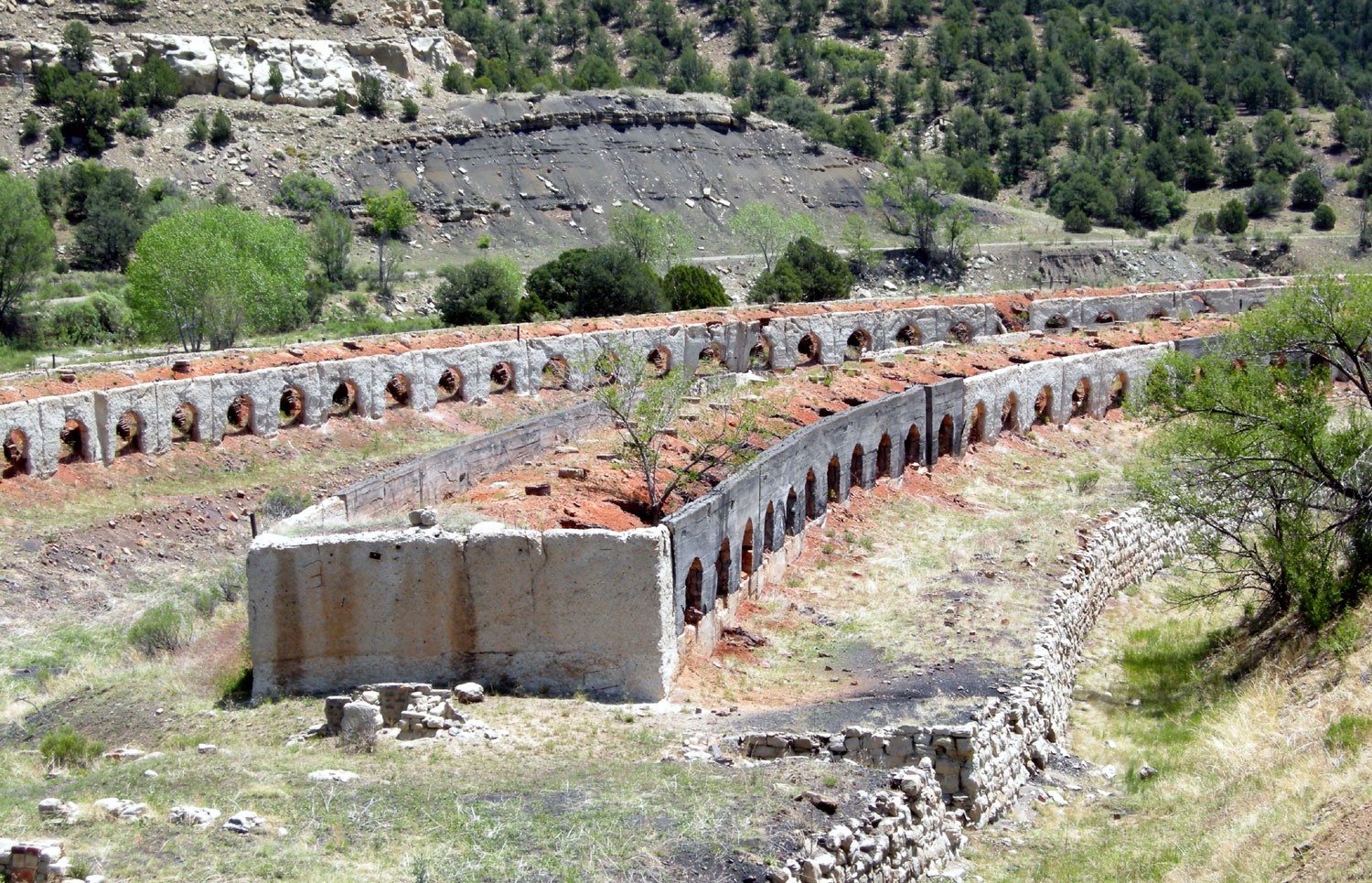
Another view of the ovens.

There were 62 households, out of which 24.2% had children under the age of 18 living with them, 54.8% were married couples living together, 4.8% had a female householder with no husband present, and 33.9% were non-families. 30.6% of all households were made up of individuals, and 21.0% had someone living alone who was 65 years of age or older. The average household size was 2.24 and the average family size was 2.83.

In the town, the population was spread out, with 23.0% under the age of 18, 4.3% from 18 to 24, 20.1% from 25 to 44, 30.2% from 45 to 64, and 22.3% who were 65 years of age or older. The median age was 46 years. For every 100 females, there were 107.5 males. For every 100 females age 18 and over, there were 98.1 males.

The median income for a household in the town was $23,958, and the median income for a family was $40,179. Males had a median income of $20,000 versus $26,250 for females. The per capita income for the town was $15,503. There were 7.3% of families and 6.9% of the population living below the poverty line, including 7.0% of under eighteens and 5.1% of those over 64.

== See also ==
- List of municipalities in Colorado
- Spanish Peaks
