= Baca House and Outbuilding =

- U.S. National Register of Historic Places
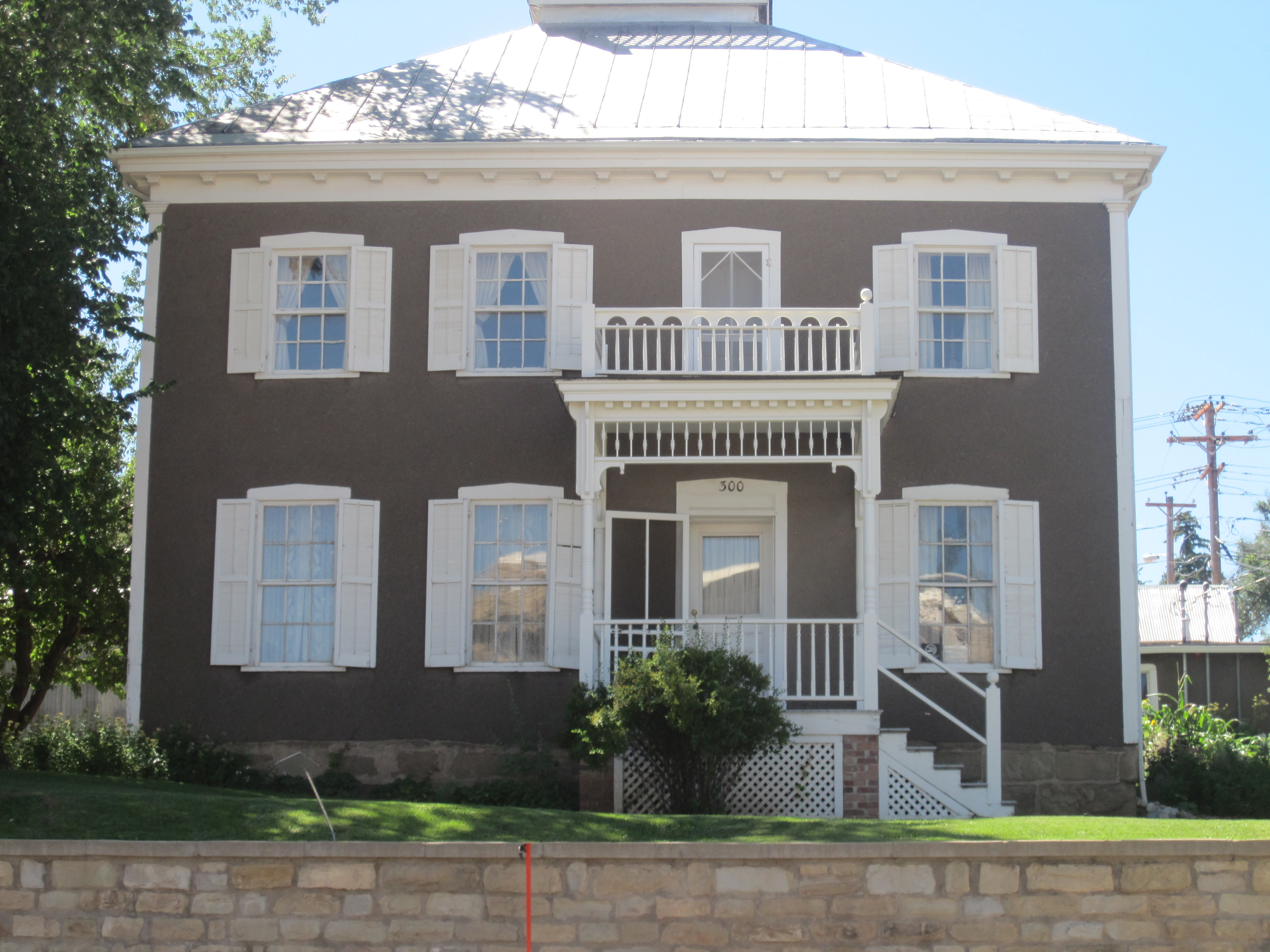

- Location within Colorado
- Location: 300 block of Main St., Trinidad, Colorado
- Coordinates: 37°10′09″N 104°30′09″W
- Area: 0.5 acres (0.20 ha)
- Built: 1869
- NRHP reference No.: 70000165
- Added to NRHP: February 26, 1970

The Baca House and Outbuilding, in Trinidad, Colorado, was listed on the National Register of Historic Places in 1970.

The Baca House is part of the Trinidad History Museum, which "features the historic Bloom Mansion and Baca House, two residences built in the late 19th century, as well as heritage gardens and the Santa Fe Trail Museum, all on one block in Trinidad's acclaimed historic district."

It is a two-story adobe house having 10 rooms, which was home of rancher and businessman Felipe Baca. An adobe outbuilding includes 12 rooms, arranged in a 160 feet (49 m) long building, which housed ranch hands and visitors.

The house was originally built for "Santa Fe Trail entrepreneur" John Hough. Felipe and Dolores Baca purchased it for 22,000 pounds of wool. It was built in 1869 or 1870.

The property is on the 300 block of Main St. in Trinidad. The Bloom Mansion is adjacent.

In 1970 it was expected the house, after renovations were completed, would be opened as a museum.
