= Trinidad station (Colorado) =

Train station in Trinidad, Colorado, United States

Trinidad, CO
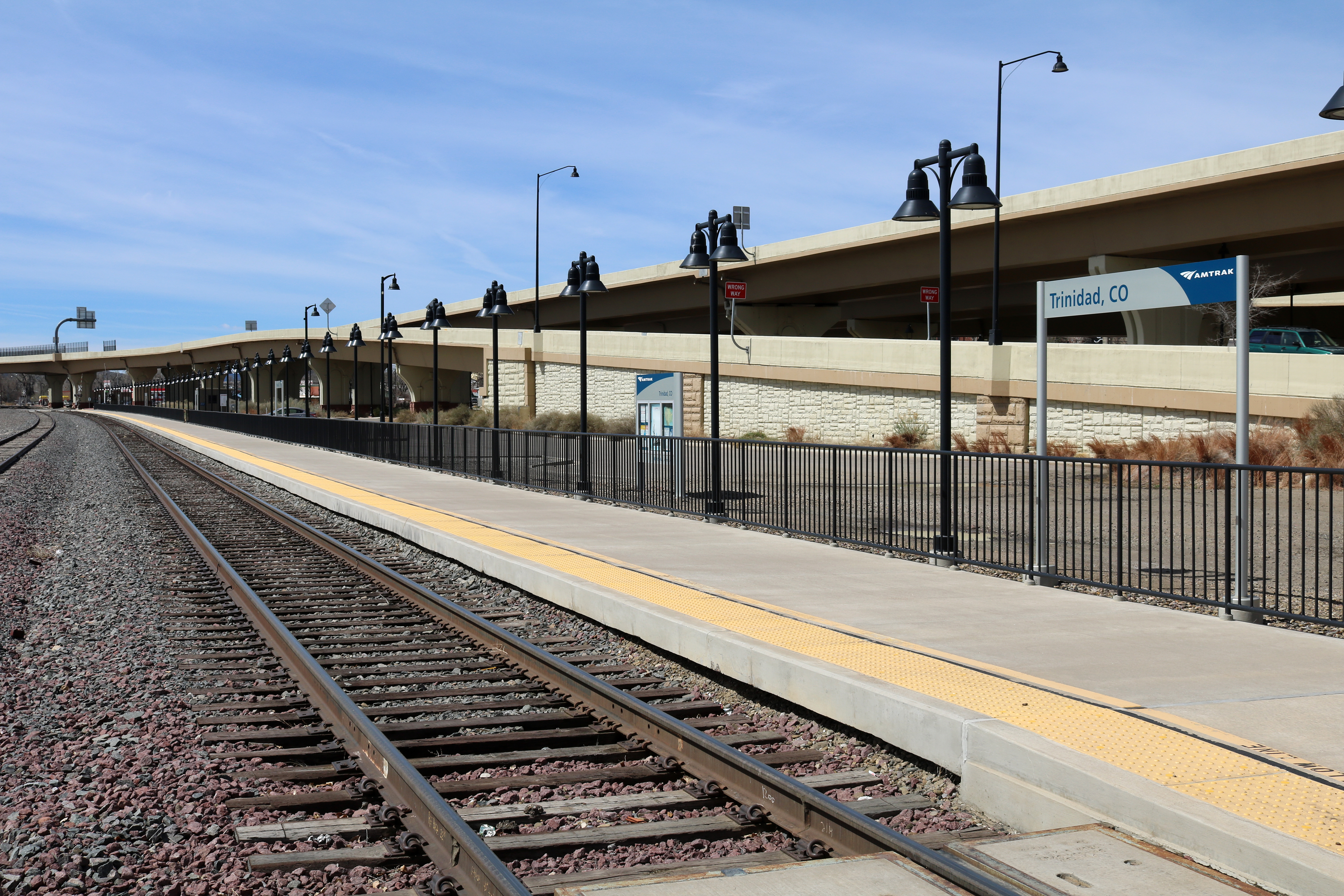
- Trinidad station platform

General information
- Location: 110 West Pine Street; Trinidad, Colorado
- Coordinates: 37.1732°N 104.5080°W
- Line: BNSF Raton Subdivision
- Platforms: 1 side platform
- Tracks: 2

Other information
- Station code: Amtrak: TRI

Passengers
- FY 2025: 6,917 (Amtrak)

Services
Preceding station	Amtrak	Following station
Raton toward Los Angeles	Southwest Chief	La Junta toward Chicago
Former services
Preceding station	Atchison, Topeka and Santa Fe Railway	Following station
Jansen toward Los Angeles	Main Line	El Moro toward Chicago
Location

Trinidad station is a train station in Trinidad, Colorado served by Amtrak. It is served by Amtrak's Southwest Chief line. Trinidad station was originally built by the Atchison, Topeka and Santa Fe Railway, however it was not built in the Spanish Mission style, as many former Santa Fe Railroad stations were.

In the late 2000s, the South Central Council of Governments (South Central COG), which operates a local bus service, decided to pursue funding for a new multimodal transportation center to serve intercity passenger rail and local, regional, and intercity buses. Owned by the city but operated and maintained by the South Central COG, it would contain a waiting area with seating, restrooms, and ticket booths.

== See also ==
- List of Amtrak stations
