= Jackie Martin =

Jackie Martin may refer to:

- Jackie Martin (cyclist) (born 1971), South African female cyclist
- Jackie Martin (footballer) (1914–1996), English footballer
- Jackie Martin (photojournalist) (1903–1969), American newspaperwoman
