= Simpson's Rest =

Landmark near Trinidad, Colorado, US

Coordinates: 37°10′53″N 104°30′49″W

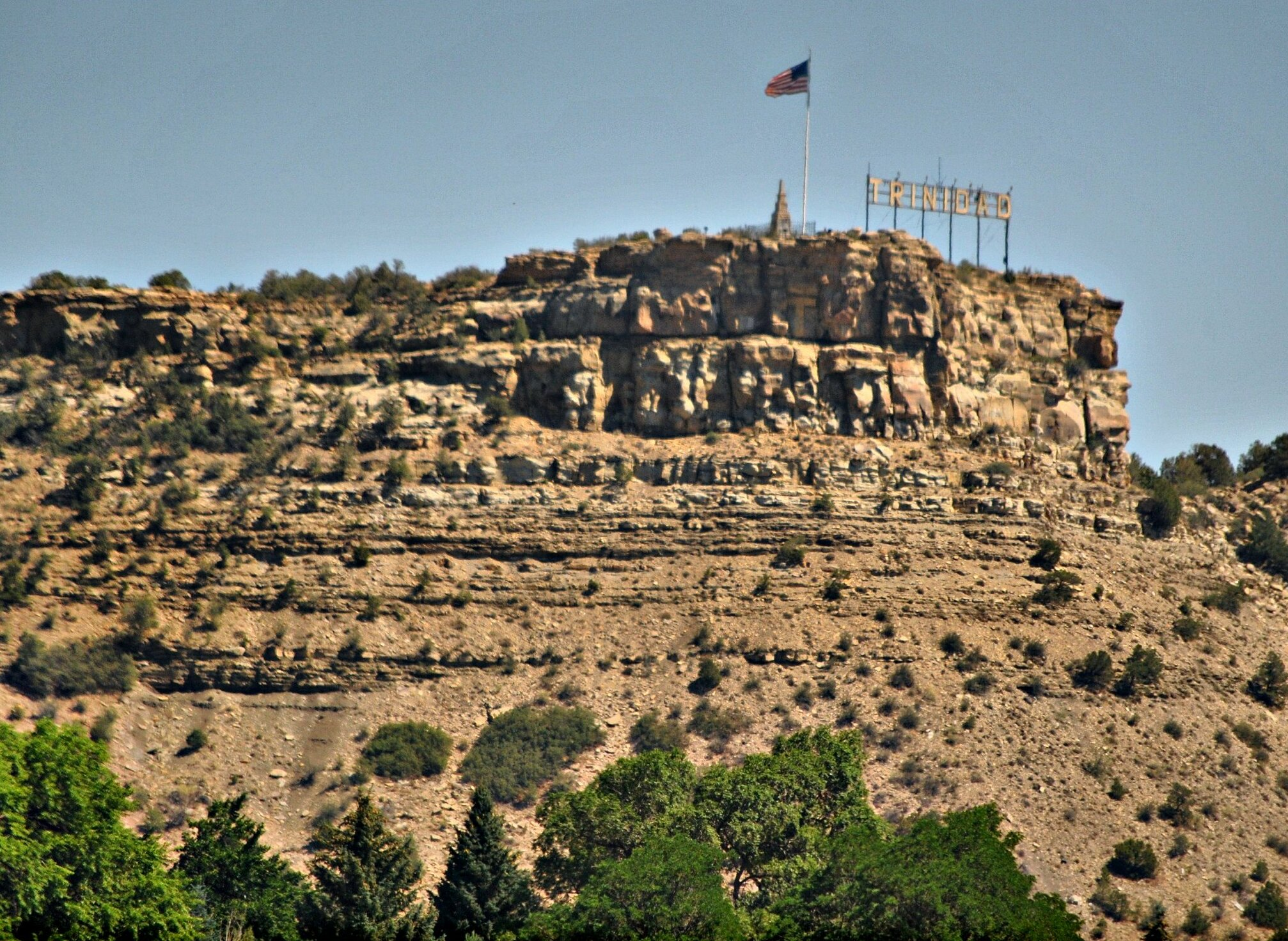
2012 photo

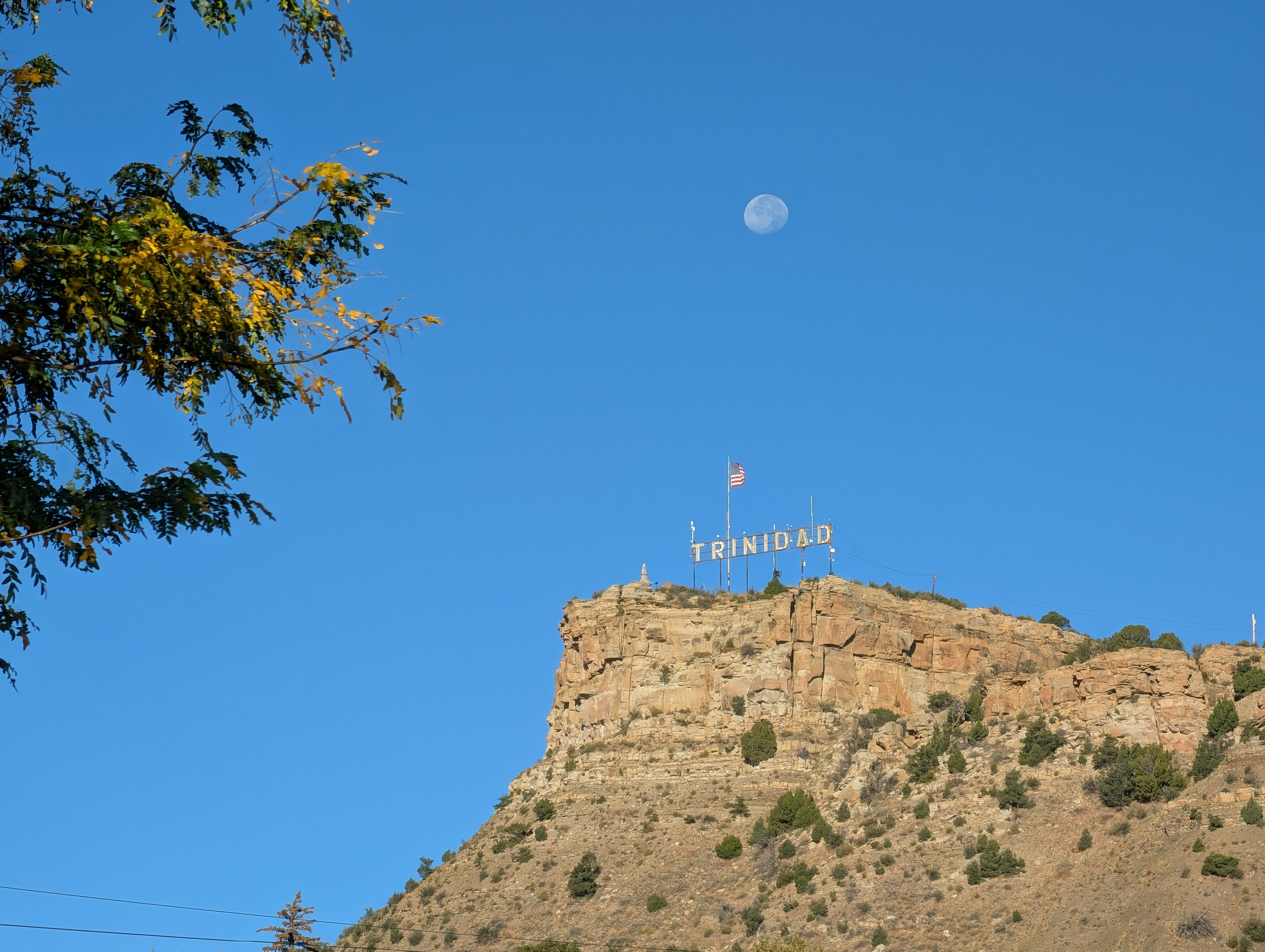
Simpson's Rest and Moon, Fall 2025

Simpson's Rest is a butte and rock formation which is a landmark overlooking Trinidad, Colorado. It is the burial place of explorer and trader George S. Simpson and was also the longtime home of frontiersman Richens Lacy "Uncle Dick" Wootton during his later years. The summit is marked by a U.S. flag and the word "TRINIDAD" spelled out in large white letters.

Richens Lacy Wootton, better known as "Uncle Dick," was a famous mountain man, trader, and builder of the Raton Pass toll road. In the 1870s, after selling the toll road to the Atchison, Topeka, and Santa Fe Railway, Wootton settled at Simpson's Rest. From there, he operated a stage station and continued to host travelers, dignitaries, and even outlaws, making Simpson's Rest not just a geological feature but also a piece of frontier history. Wootton lived at Simpson's Rest until his death in 1893 and contributed to the rich cultural history of Trinidad and the surrounding region.

George Semmes Simpson was born in St. Louis, Missouri on May 7, 1818. His father, Robert, was a physician, and his mother's maiden name was Bricea Smith. He was well educated as a child. However, he had substance abuse problems for which his father encouraged him to travel to the west. In 1841, he traveled to Laramie Wyoming. He then went to the Arapaho village in at Cherry Creek where Denver, Colorado was eventually located. Chief Little Raven invited him to dine. Simpson was buried in Trinidad, Colorado. The site has been commemorated as Simpson's Rest.

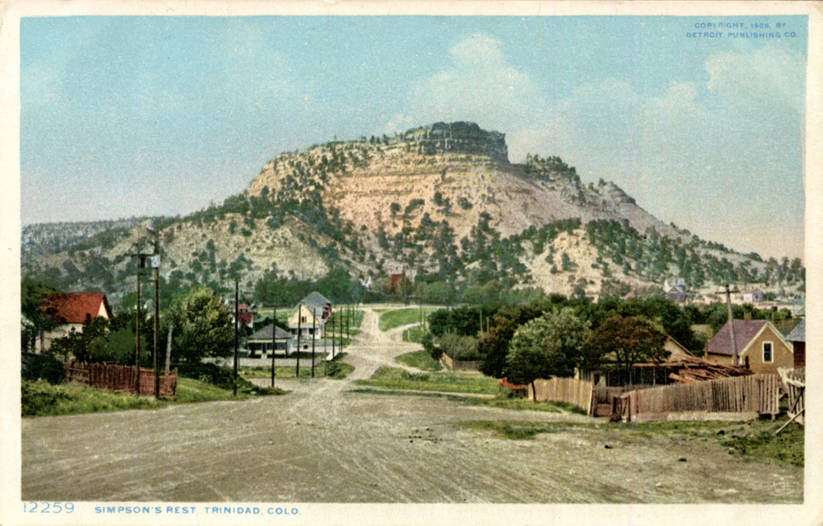
Image from 1900 to 1909: "One sees from the train a ruddy cliff, rising to a height of several hundred feet...."

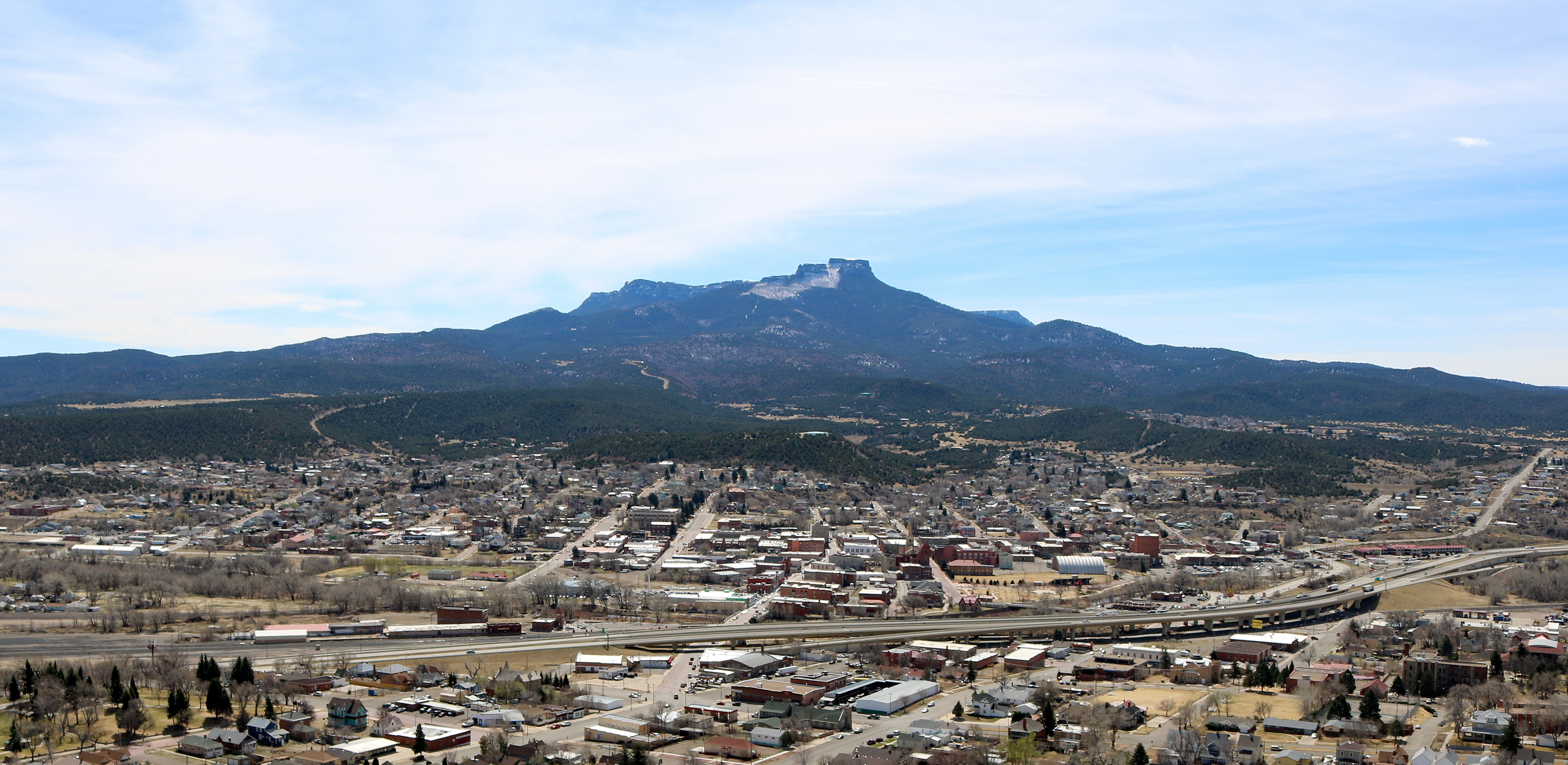
View from Simpson's Rest over Trinidad. Fisher's Peak is afar.

In 2017, an 11-year-old girl died after falling 20 feet from the overlook.
