= Richens Lacey Wootton =

American frontiersman (1816–1893)

Richens Lacy Wootton
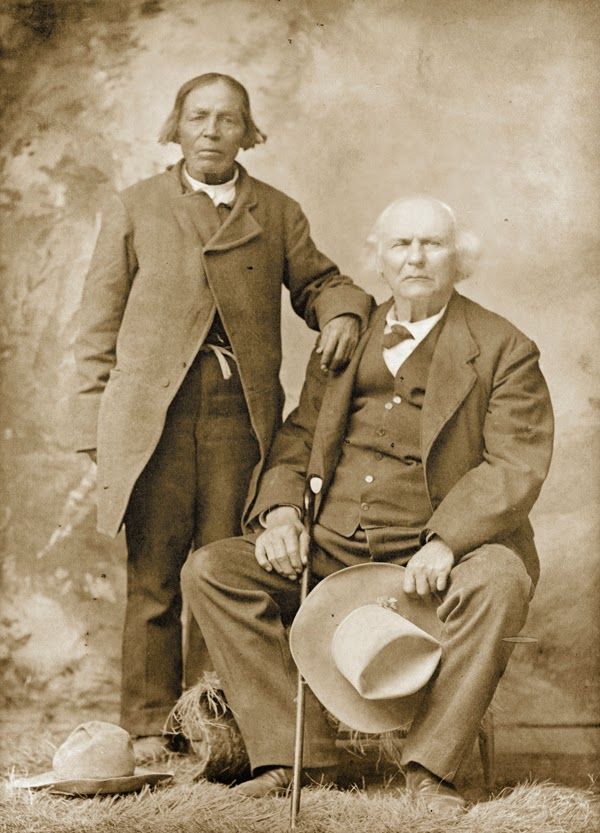
- Richens Lacy "Uncle Dick" Wootton (pictured right) with Ute Chief Conniach (left).
- Born: May 6, 1816; Mecklenburg County, Virginia, U.S.
- Died: 1893 (aged 76–77); Trinidad, Colorado, U.S.
- Other name: Uncle Dick
- Occupations: Frontiersman, trapper, trader, entrepreneur, scout
- Known for: Building the Raton Pass Toll Road
- Spouse(s): Maria Dolores LeFebre (m. 1848–1855, her death); Mary Ann Manning (m. c.1857–1861, her death); Fanny Brown (m. 1863–c.1864, her death); Maria Paulina Lujan (m. 1871–1893, his death)
- Children: At least 15 children (including R. L. Wootton Jr.)

Richens Lacy Wootton (May 6, 1816 – 1893), commonly known as "Uncle Dick" Wootton, was an American frontiersman, mountain man, trader, scout, and entrepreneur active during the westward expansion of the United States. Wootton is best remembered for constructing a toll road over Raton Pass, which helped improve travel on the Santa Fe Trail and contributed to the development of Colorado and New Mexico.

== Early life and frontier career ==
Wootton was born in Mecklenburg County, Virginia to a family of Scottish descent. At age 17, he left home and traveled to Mississippi before heading west to Independence, Missouri. In 1836, he joined Bent and St. Vrain's wagon train to Bent's Fort on the Arkansas River, where he began a lifelong career as a frontiersman.

He quickly made a name for himself trading with the Sioux and other tribes, trapping beaver, hunting buffalo, and freighting goods across the western frontier. In 1837, Wootton led a 17-man trapping expedition through what is now Colorado, Wyoming, and New Mexico. A year later, he embarked on a two-year, 5,000-mile trek through the American West, trading furs as far west as Fort Vancouver in present-day Washington.

Wootton also supplied buffalo meat to Bent's Fort and later raised buffalo for sale to zoos and exhibitions in the East. His reputation grew, and he became a well-known figure among both Native Americans and settlers.

== Marriages and family ==
Wootton married multiple times throughout his life. His first marriage was to Maria Dolores LeFebre of Taos, New Mexico, in 1848. Maria Dolores, daughter of a French trader named Manuel LeFebre and a local Taos woman, died in childbirth in 1855 after bearing four children.

Around 1857, Wootton married Mary Ann Manning and moved to the nascent settlement of Denver, where he operated a saloon, hotel, and general trading and loan business. After Mary Ann's death in 1861, Wootton returned to southeastern Colorado and took up farming near Pueblo, Colorado.

In 1863, he married Fanny Brown, who died shortly after giving birth to a daughter.

On June 17, 1871, Wootton married sixteen-year-old Maria Paulina Lujan of Mora, New Mexico. The couple had ten children together, six of whom survived to adulthood. Maria Paulina outlived Wootton by more than four decades, dying in 1935.

== Military service and conflicts ==
Wootton served as a scout for Colonel Doniphan during the Mexican–American War and later participated in campaigns following the Taos Revolt. He was involved in various conflicts on the frontier, often alongside prominent figures like Kit Carson, Tom Tobin, and Antoine Leroux, though he maintained that he only engaged in violence when necessary.

== The nickname "Uncle Dick" ==
In 1858, while traveling east to visit family, Wootton stopped in the area that would become Denver, Colorado. There, he became a local favorite after sharing barrels of rare bourbon whiskey with the community. His generosity and storytelling earned him the nickname "Uncle Dick." He remained in Denver for several years, running successful businesses.

== The Raton Pass Toll Road ==
In the mid-1860s, Wootton relocated to Trinidad, Colorado, where he obtained approval from both the Colorado and New Mexico territorial legislatures to construct a toll road over Raton Pass, long considered one of the most difficult segments of the Santa Fe Trail.

With the help of Ute laborers under Chief Conniache, Wootton blasted rock, built bridges, and constructed a 27-mile road, which opened in 1866. The toll road significantly improved the safety and speed of travel for military convoys, stagecoaches, merchants, and gold seekers. Native Americans were often allowed to pass without charge.

By the early 1870s, Wootton also operated a stage station and residence at the pass, supporting a steady business that earned approximately $600 per month.

== Sale to the Atchison, Topeka, and Santa Fe Railroad ==
In 1878, the Atchison, Topeka and Santa Fe Railway sought to build a rail line through Raton Pass. Wootton negotiated a modest deal, accepting a $50 monthly stipend and free transportation and groceries for Maria Paulina for life, in lieu of a lump sum. While some considered the agreement to be a poor bargain, Maria Paulina benefited from the arrangement until her death in 1935–57 years later.

== Later years and death ==
Wootton spent his final years at Simpson's Rest near Trinidad, Colorado, where he continued to welcome travelers, including prominent figures and outlaws. He died in 1893 at the age of 77. His son, R. L. Wootton Jr., later served in the Colorado legislature.

== Legacy ==
Richens Lacy Wootton is remembered as one of the last prominent mountain men and as a symbol of the rugged, entrepreneurial spirit of the American West. The Santa Fe Railway named a locomotive in his honor. He appears as a character in George MacDonald Fraser’s novel Flashman and the Redskins and Allan Vaughan Elston’s The Sheriff of San Miguel and is mentioned in James A. Michener’s Centennial.

== Bibliography ==
- Conrad, Howard L. Uncle Dick Wootton. W.E. Dibble & Co., 1890.
- Hafen, LeRoy R. Fur Trappers and Traders in the Far Southwest. Utah State University Press, 1997.
- Inman, Colonel Henry. The Old Santa Fe Trail. Crane & Co., 1898.
- McKinnan, Bess. "The Toll Road Over Raton Pass", New Mexico Historical Review, 1926.
- Taylor, Morris F. First Mail West: Stagecoach Lines on the Santa Fe Trail. University of New Mexico Press, 1971.
- Michener, James A. Centennial. Random House, 1974.
