= Jackie Martin (photojournalist) =

American photojournalist (1903–1969)

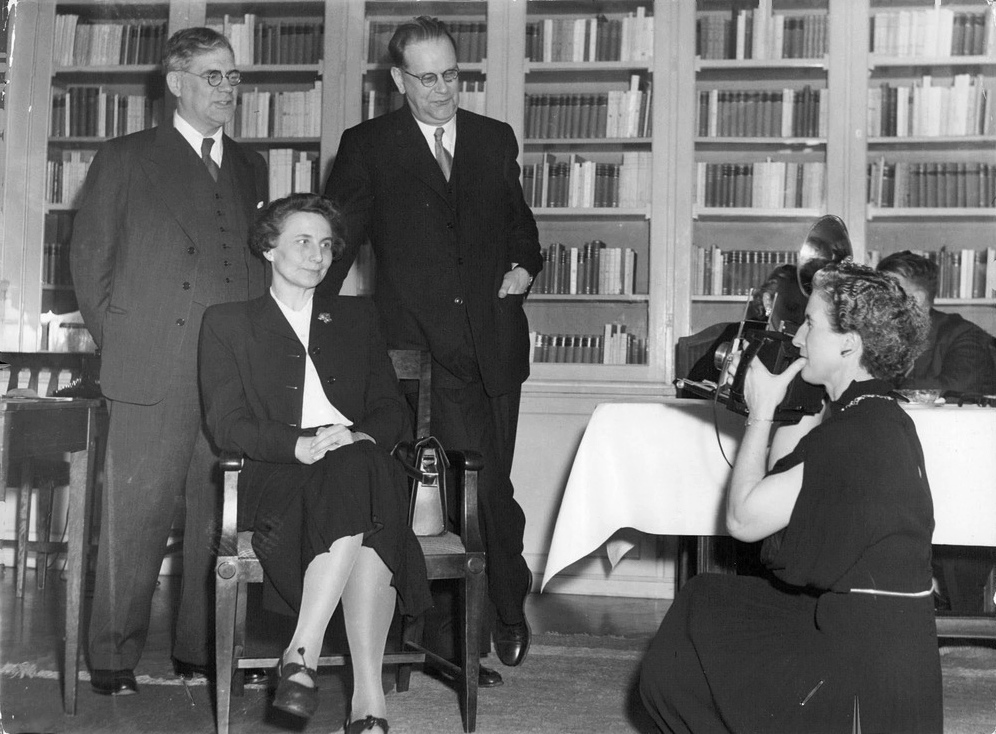
- Jackie Martin taking a photo of the Swedish minister for foreign affairs Östen Undén and the Swedish prime minister Tage Erlander with his wife.
- Born: Cecilia Barber Martin; April 1, 1903; Braddock, Pennsylvania, U.S.
- Died: December 15, 1969 (aged 66); Washington, D.C., U.S.
- Resting place: Rock Creek Cemetery
- Known for: Photography, Journalism,

Jackie Martin (April 1, 1903 – December 15, 1969) was a photojournalist and newspaper editor who achieved firsts and near-firsts as a woman in the American workforce. She was the first woman to become art director and picture editor of a metropolitan newspaper and the first to be accepted to membership in the prestigious White House Press Corps. She was also the first woman to be hired as sports editor at a major metropolitan daily paper and first, or one of the first, to manage and coach a professional basketball team. She achieved recognition as the first official photographer and public relations officer for the Women's Army Auxiliary Corps and the first to wear a WAAC uniform. She received awards for her photography, for her work as a war correspondent, and for her internationally-recognized lifetime achievements in journalism.

== Education ==
Martin was educated in the public schools of Washington, D.C. The curator of a 1986 exhibit called "Jackie Martin, The Washington Years" wrote that after convincing the administration to allow it she became the first girl in her elementary school to take an industrial arts class. She attended Eastern High School between 1918 and 1921 and upon graduating received an athletic scholarship amounting to a year's college tuition. Lacking money to pay room, board, and other essentials that were not covered by the scholarship, she spent a year working in a sequence of retail jobs, including one as editor of a department store magazine. In the fall of 1922 Martin enrolled in Syracuse University and during her freshman year she earned letters in basketball, track, and rifle shooting. Although she took jobs on campus and set up a laundry pick-up service, she was unable to earn enough money to continue beyond the first year.

== Early career as a journalist ==
Martin became a professional journalist at age 20 when, having returned home from Syracuse, she used her experience as editor and athlete to obtain the position of sports editor for the Washington Times. In 1969 her obituary stated that in taking the job she became the first ever woman sports editor at a daily paper, however, it is more accurate to say that she was the first woman editor of a major metropolitan daily since in 1906 a woman named Ina Eloise Young had become "sporting editor" of the Chronicle-News of Trinidad, Colorado. During 1925 and 1926, while still working at the Times, Martin also worked as society editor in the Washington office of a photo publishing and news photography company called Underwood & Underwood. It was during this time that she learned the basics of photojournalism. In 1926 she left Underwood & Underwood and shifted from sports editor on the Times to a three-month position as staff photographer in the joint newsroom of the Times and its sister publication the Washington Herald. During 1928 and 1929 she spent another few months as the Herald's assistant society editor. In March 1929 Martin joined the Washington Daily News and for the next year and a half was one of its staff photographers and feature news reporters while also handling special editions and filling in as society editor.

== Career as a sportswoman ==
While she was sports editor of the Times and society editor at Underwood & Underwood Martin had a third job as publicity manager for a women's sports club, the Metropolitan Athletic Club, and was a starting member of its basketball team, the Mets. The team had an unbeaten season in 1924, thus earning recognition as District of Columbia basketball champions. (Note: The Metropolitan Athletic Club was founded in November 1923 primarily as the Mets' sponsor. The District of Columbia also possessed a men's Metropolitan Athletic Club.) During this time she was an officer of the organization that coordinated women's basketball locally and in addition to all her other activities she taught basketball classes two evenings a week in a local gym. (Note: The organization was the Washington Athletic Council and was organized to promote the game as a non-commercial sport as well as to coordinate activities of the Women's Basketball League.) (Note: The gym was located in a large public school, the Business Night School, which attracted many adult students and was said to be one of the leading institutions of its type in the country.) On leaving her job as staff photographer for the Times and Herald in 1927, Martin became manager and publicist for a multipurpose arena sports arena that aimed to be the "Madison Square Garden of Washington." (Note: Owned and directed by John S. Blick, the Arcadia Auditorium and Arena was a multipurpose structure that included a gymnasium, ballroom, ice rink, convention hall, and bowling alleys. It hosted a wide variety of cultural events and sports including men's and women's professional basketball.) At this time she was also manager and coach of a women's professional basketball team, the Arcadians, which played its home games at the arena. The team attracted local notice by playing local boys' teams using men's rules. They competed in preliminary events before games of the men's professional teams and were said to be one of the first if not the first professional women's team. (Note: A sports reporter said he expected the team's first game to be more interesting than the pro game that followed it. In 1997 one of the team's players recalled that she received more money for her part-time playing than she earned from her full time job ($5.00 for each practice session and $10.00 for each game). In 1927 the team switched to women's rules and played other women's teams.) Martin hoped to compete in half-mile event of the 1928 Olympics, the first in which women would be competing in track events. She was forced to withdraw, however, when injured during the U.S. track championships which were held in Newark, New Jersey as the country's Olympic trials.

== Mature career as a journalist ==
Jackie Martin, photo of two farm women and their dog, taken in the mountains of east Tennessee in 1936

On leaving the Daily News in September 1930 Martin returned to the Herald as feature editor and photographer. She soon added picture editor to her responsibilities at the paper and, when owner William Randolph Hearst merged the offices of the Herald with those of the Times, she served in the same capacity for both papers. With this appointment Martin became the first woman to hold these management positions on a metropolitan newspaper. At that time she directed a staff of about a dozen men responsible for covering straight news, society, fashions, theaters, and sports in two or more pages of photos each day. (Note: An article published in 1939 said Martin's staff of photographers and writers contained over 20 men.) Martin's mentor and boss was the paper's domineering and mercurial editor, Cissy Patterson. One author says that in the 1930s Martin was often credited with "almost single-handedly transforming William Randolph Hearst's tired Herald into what was to become Cissy Patterson's sleek, eye-catching Times-Herald." In 1936 Martin and Patterson visited a rural section of Tennessee and North Carolina to produce a series of six articles called "Dixie's Dead End." One of the articles described the hardships faced by two elderly farm women at the height of the depression. The image at left comes from this shoot.

In August 1940 Martin left the Times-Herald to begin a career as freelance photographer, publicist, war correspondent, lecturer, and magazine editor. Between 1940 and 1944 she seems never to have been at rest. At the beginning of that period she spent two seasons crossing the country as a paid lecturer as well as managing an advertising campaign for the Chrysler Corporation. She next traveled by air across Brazil to shoot aerial and ground photos for two books profiling that country. In the winter months of 1941 and spring of 1942 she set up a photo department for the Washington bureau of the Chicago Sun-Times and began work as associate editor of the Woman's Home Companion. (Note: In 1941 Marshall Field III founded the Chicago Sun in opposition to the conservative and intensely isolationist Chicago Tribune. The A few days after the Sun first appeared, Japan attacked Pearl Harbor and the Tribune totally reversed its anti-war policy. With its rationale thus deflated, the Sun never achieved the wide circulation it initially expected and in 1948 merged with the Chicago Daily Times.) During the second half of 1942 she served as photographer and publicist for the first group of women to enter military service with the Army. In 1944 she obtained a contract from the Macmillan publishing company (of New York) for a book about nurses in the U.S. Army and was sent to Italy as war correspondent for Ladies' Home Journal. Given the opportunity to witness the invasion of southern France, she broke the Macmillan contract and accompanied the 7th Army in its liberation of Marseilles, Lyon, and Toulon.

During the war years Martin contributed freelance photos and features to widely-circulated U.S. magazines, including Time, The Saturday Evening Post, Colliers, and Look. (Note: Other magazines included Cosmopolitan, Country Gentleman, Family Circle, Ladies' Home Journal, McCall's, and Town and Country.) She continued to produce freelance photojournalism after her return from Europe in 1945. For example, in May and June of that year she published articles in the Washington Star on the physical appearance of Army nurses ("Nurses Are Pretty," May 27, 1945) and on the friendliness of servicemen towards the children they encountered behind the lines ("Soldiers and Kids," June 3, 1945). The following year she served as feature editor and photographer in the Washington office of International News Photos and as photographer for King Features Syndicate, both owned by William Randolph Hearst for whom she had worked at the beginning of her career in journalism. She also resumed lecturing, this time under the auspices of the W. Colston Leigh Bureau. Throughout the 1940s Martin had done freelance work for Parade magazine and continued that work into the early 1950s. (Note: In 1941, soon after he began publishing the Chicago Sun, Marshall Field III introduced the weekly supplement,Parade, to accompany it and other newspapers.) After 1952 Martin did little or no freelance work as she was by then stationed in Europe as a full-time employee of the United States Foreign Service.

=== Photographic technique ===
Jackie Martin, photo of Donald Nelson from Life, July 6, 1942

In 1925, when first learning her craft at the Underwood photo service, she used a 5x7 Graflex camera using glass plates rather than roll film as recording media. During much of her career as a photojournalist she used a variety of cameras including the Graflex 4x5 press camera with sheet film holders, a reflex camera with 120 roll film (probably Rolleiflex), and two 35mm compact cameras, Contax and Leica. The early 5x7 Graflex used flash powder for artificial lighting. The press Graflex and Rolleiflex used flash bulbs in detachable hand-grip units. The 35mm cameras could be used with flash units but were mainly used with available light. Martin was an early adopter of compact camera photography and, when it became available in the late 1940s, of high speed electronic flash lighting.

The vast majority of Martin's photographs show people, not places or things. Like many other press photographers, she gave priority to realistic portrayal over aesthetic values in her work and her style was said to be unremarkable. She said her primary aim was to respect her subjects and accord them the best possible image. Shown at right is a typical photo from a magazine feature. She took it with a 35mm camera using available light for an article on Donald Nelson, head of the recently established War Production Board. It appeared in the issue of Life for July 6, 1942, with the caption: "In Glencoe darkroom, Nelson displays a portrait of a friend developed himself. A mediocre photographer, he enjoys dabbling with chemicals more than taking pictures."

Jackie Martin, photo of Frances Benedict with acetate foil for lamination, National Archives, International News Photos, 1946

Shown at left is a 1946 photo that is more inventive and playful than her usual workmanlike news photos. She took it while working for the International News Photos service during preparation of a news feature on the archives. It shows a staff member wrapped in the transparent acetate foil that conservators used to laminate sheets of paper. Despite the gimmickry the photo shows techniques that Martin commonly employed. She shot the subject head-on, lit by flash held high on the left. She staged the scene to eliminate distracting details. The female subject was shown sympathetically, her pose and facial expression displaying cheerfulness and determination to be a good sport. The format was 3 x 4 and the camera probably a Speed Graphic.

== Government photographer and publicist ==
Before joining the foreign service in 1950 Martin had taken part in one official and one unofficial project for the U.S. government. In 1933 she served as unofficial press attaché to Ruth Bryan Owen during Owen's first months as ambassador to Denmark and Iceland. Between July and December 1942 she served in uniform as photographer and assistant public relations officer to the newly formed Women's Army Auxiliary Corps.

In the late 1940s Martin had completed some projects for the Christian Science Monitor. Roscoe Drummond was then chief of the paper's Washington Bureau. (Note: There is some chance they had been previously acquainted since he had been a sophomore at Syracuse during the year she was enrolled there. If not, it is certain they met during her work for the Monitor.) In 1949 Drummond was appointed European Director of Information for the Economic Cooperation Administration. The following year he appointed Martin to be the ECA's chief of European Photographic Services. Based in Paris, she managed an office that provided photographs to promote implementation of the Marshall Plan across 18 countries. Her major achievement during the six years she served in that position was the organization of an international traveling exhibition of photographs called Family of Man that had been assembled by Edward Steichen and premiered at the Museum of Modern Art in 1955. (Note: During the time Martin directed the European Photographic Services it was contained within four agencies: the Economic Cooperation Administration was succeeded in 1951 by the Mutual Security Agency. That agency was succeeded in 1953 by the Foreign Operations Administration which later that year was merged into the United States Foreign Operations Administration. In 1955 that agency was superseded by the International Cooperation Administration.) After returning from Paris in 1956 Martin spent ten years in freelance photojournalism while also working at her brother's motion picture studio. Her last major job was a 1967 government contract in which she documented military gravesites in Europe for the American Battle Monuments Commission.

== Books and manuscripts ==
During the summer months of 1941, Martin traveled with an author known for her coverage of aviation news on a survey of Brazil by air. With cooperation from the Brazilian government, they flew over the country in an outdated single-engine airplane. The trip resulted in many magazine feature articles and two books, both credited to Alice Rogers Hager as author: Frontier by Air (New York, Macmillan, 1942) and Giant to the South (New York, Macmillan, 1945). Martin's few months as WAAC photographer and publicist resulted in a book authored by Jean Stansbury called Bars on Her Shoulders (New York, Dodd, Mead & Co., 1943). While she was a war correspondent in southern Europe, Martin assembled photos and prepared text for two books, The Nurses of World War II and Nurses in Action, but amid postwar disinterest in the immediate past was unable to find a publisher for either. Subsequently she again collaborated with Hager in a photographic portrait of Washington, D.C. called Washington, City of Destiny (New York, Macmillan, 1949). In reviewing this book, a critic for The Washington Post wrote: "Miss Martin focuses on the usual beauties of the city—its parks, fountains, formal gardens, sweeping vistas—with one notable exception. She deserves some kind of award for taking note of the seamier side of the Capital. There is one shot of a slum dwelling."

== Clubwoman ==
Martin was adept at making and keeping connections with others, whether they be friends, acquaintances, or business associates. Many of these connections were with women who, like herself, believed in the ability of affinity groups to assist the advance of women in professional and cultural affairs. As a first year student she joined the Delta Gamma sorority at Syracuse University and retained her membership through the rest of her life. In 1932 she was a founding member of the Washington Newspaper Women's Club and continued to be active in it for the rest of her career. (Note: Founded in April 1932 as a breakaway from the Women's National Press Club. Unlike the latter, the Newspaper Women's Club limited its membership to newspaper reporters and writers, excluding women in other press roles, such as publicity. It later changed its name to American Newspaper Women's Club and then American News Women's Club.) Earlier she had joined the organization from which that club broke off, the Women's National Press Club. She regularly participated in the Press Club's satirical stunt nights and often drafted, composed, and performed in their skits. In 1936 she was elected to be an associate member to the Royal Photographic Society of England. (Note: Martin was not the first woman to become a member of the Royal Photographic Society. In fact there were seven women among society members in the year of its founding, 1853.) Martin became the first female member of the White House News Photographers Association in 1942. (Note: In 1921, 24 press photographers who were assigned to cover the White House established the White House News Photographers Association as a pressure group to obtain better access to the building itself and the president. Martin was denied membership when she first applied in 1929 and again in 1941. She was finally accepted in 1942. By the end of 1945 the membership included five active women.) Six years later she became an associate member of Theta Sigma Phi, a national professional and honorary fraternity for women in journalism. In 1955 she was elected second vice president of the Newspaper Women's Club.

News accounts of the Washington social scene contain frequent mentions of her participation in club events and in June 1940 she gave an outdoor party for members of the two women's press clubs that featured hot dogs, steaks, a keg of beer, and, according to one account, "singing and much gay talk." (Note: Examples of her frequent mentions in news accounts include the following items that appeared in The Washington Post in 1941 and 1942: "Miss Pat Jarrett, Of Australian Legation, Is Feted" (28 Oct 1941), "D.C. University Women to Honor Dr. W.E. Hager Saturday Evening" (02 Nov 1941, L11), "Club Will Give Tea Today for Defense Girls" (23 Nov 1941, SC8), "Clubs: Newspaperwomen to Trade Chatter At Club's Anniversary Fete Today" (04 Apr 1942, 12), "Clubs: Women's National Press Club Installs Officers at Inaugural Luncheon Tuesday" (27 June 1942, 15).)

== Executive of a motion picture company ==
When Martin returned from Paris she was reported to be worn down and hoping to retire. At the insistence of her brother, Philip Martin, Jr., she nonetheless agreed to help run the Washington media company he directed. This was Norwood Studios, a motion picture production facility that specialized in government and commercial documentaries. In 1960 she became the company's vice president, and, according to one account, helped to make the firm the largest producer of documentary films south of New York.

== Signal achievements, honors, and awards ==
In 1923 Martin became the first-ever woman sports editor at a major metropolitan daily paper when she took over that job at the Washington Times. (Note: Ina Eloise Young was the first woman newspaper sports editor. As noted above, she became "sporting editor" of the Chronicle-News of Trinidad, Colorado, in 1906.) In 1926 Martin was either the first or possibly one of the first women to manage and coach a professional basketball team. In 1937 she was the first woman to become art director and picture editor of a metropolitan paper. In 1941 she received George Arents distinguished alumni award from Syracuse University and was the first non-graduate to receive the honor. Later that year she was the first photographer given permission to take photographs by air in Brazil. The following year she was the first photographer and publicist for the Women's Army Auxiliary Corps and first woman to wear a WAAC uniform. Later that year she achieved a long time goal in becoming the first woman member of the White House News Photographers Association. In 1944 Martin received the War Department's Certificate of Merit and the Theater Ribbon for war correspondence for her service as war correspondent in Italy and France. On two occasions in the late 1940s she received awards from the White House News Photographers Association. In 1961 she received the Order of the Southern Cross from Brazilian Government and two years later was given an award by her sorority, the Delta Gamma Rose Award. This, the organization's highest award, is given to members who are "renowned in their chosen fields" and whose accomplishments have received national or international recognition.

== Personal life and family ==
Martin was born on April 1, 1903, in Braddock, Pennsylvania, to Philip Martin (1877–1954) and Emma Fredrica S. Herman Martin (1877–1962). Named after her paternal grandmother, Cecilia Barber Martin of Cornwall, England, her birth name was Cecilia Barber Martin. Philip Martin was a munitions expert who worked in Pittsburgh during Martin's childhood and who moved the family to Washington, D.C., during World War I in order to take a position as supervising engineer in the Old Soldiers' Home. Emma Martin was a Christian Scientist who was chaplain for the Columbia Chapter of the Daughters of the American Revolution and sometime president of the Capitol Hill History Club.

Martin had two sisters, Lydia (1900–1983) and Lillian (1908–2002), and a brother, Philip, Jr. (1916–1974). Lydia was a secretary before her marriage to a Soldiers' Home mortician, William P. Pugh. Lillian, like Martin, took a masculine nickname (Jerry) and was both an athlete and news reporter. In 1929 after working alongside Martin at the Washington Times and the Herald, she married a physician, William H. Clements, and subsequently managed his private practice in a suburb of Washington, D.C. Philip Martin, Jr., was a well-known motion picture producer of New York, Hollywood, and Washington, D.C. He owned and directed Norwood Studios, Inc., where Martin was vice president in the early 1960s.

Martin lived in her parents' house at the Soldiers' Home until, at the age of 40, she bought a house in Georgetown.

She left her papers and other archives to Syracuse University. A Syracuse archivist points out that although the collections are extensive and in other respects comprehensive, they contain little gossip about Martin's relations with other people and almost nothing about her private life. In 1932 her parents announced her engagement to a man named B. Wheeler Johnson, but there was apparently no marriage. One source notes rumors of a romantic relationship with Cissy Patterson. Another says of Patterson: "While she was editing the Times-Herald, she was carrying on a lesbian romance with the paper's picture editor."

The curator of a 1986 exhibit about Martin's years in Washington contains this statement about her public presence:

From her school days at Eastern High in Washington, D.C., to her time as a war correspondent, articles about Jackie Martin appeared in the press. While the setting might be the Delta Gamma sorority house near the Syracuse University campus, the Lindberg baby trial, the Matta Grosso in Brazil, or the Seventh Army's campaign through France, the story is the same. Plucky, diminutive, dynamic, trustworthy—especially that; ladylike, fair, self-made, hardworking photog, our girl returns from some assignment or is off to one. We can reassuredly look forward to what Jackie—the press referred to her by that somewhat androgynous nickname—has photographed. No surprises. No rude awakenings to the world's threatening otherness.

The curator adds that despite a decline in health that began during her wartime experiences, she continued to project youth and vigor even as she aged.

Martin died following a long illness, at the age of 65, on December 15, 1969, and was buried in Washington's Rock Creek Cemetery.

=== Other names used ===
She adopted the nickname Jack while young and used it as an adolescent, expanding it to Jackie when in her mid-twenties. (Note: She once said that her father liked to call her "Jack of all trades." She also said that her father and one of her grandfathers used it as a pet name for her.) From the mid-twenties onward she was almost always referred to as Jackie Martin and only occasionally as Cecilia Martin or Cecilia B. Martin.
