= Trinidad, Colorado =

City in Colorado, United States

- Home rule municipality
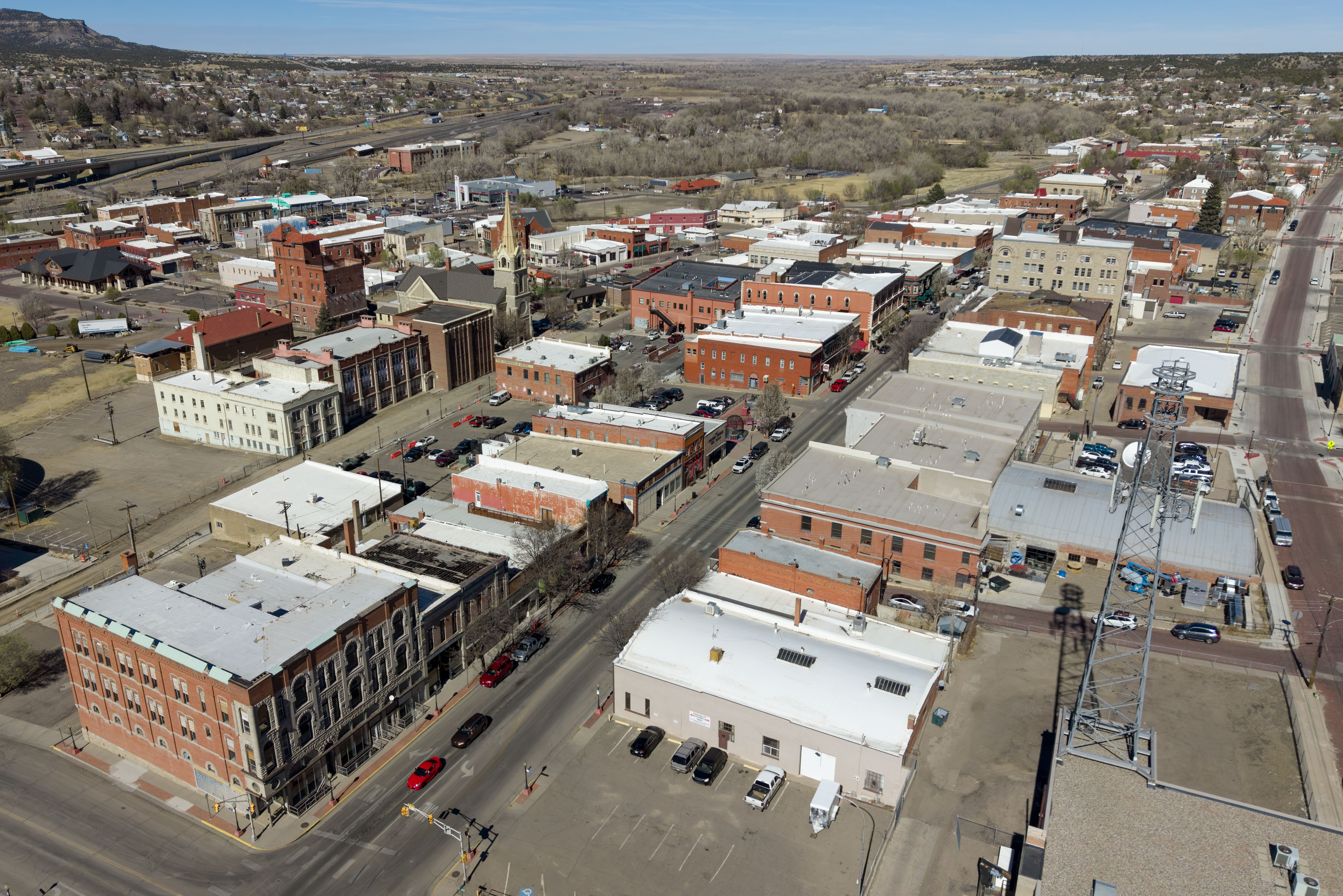
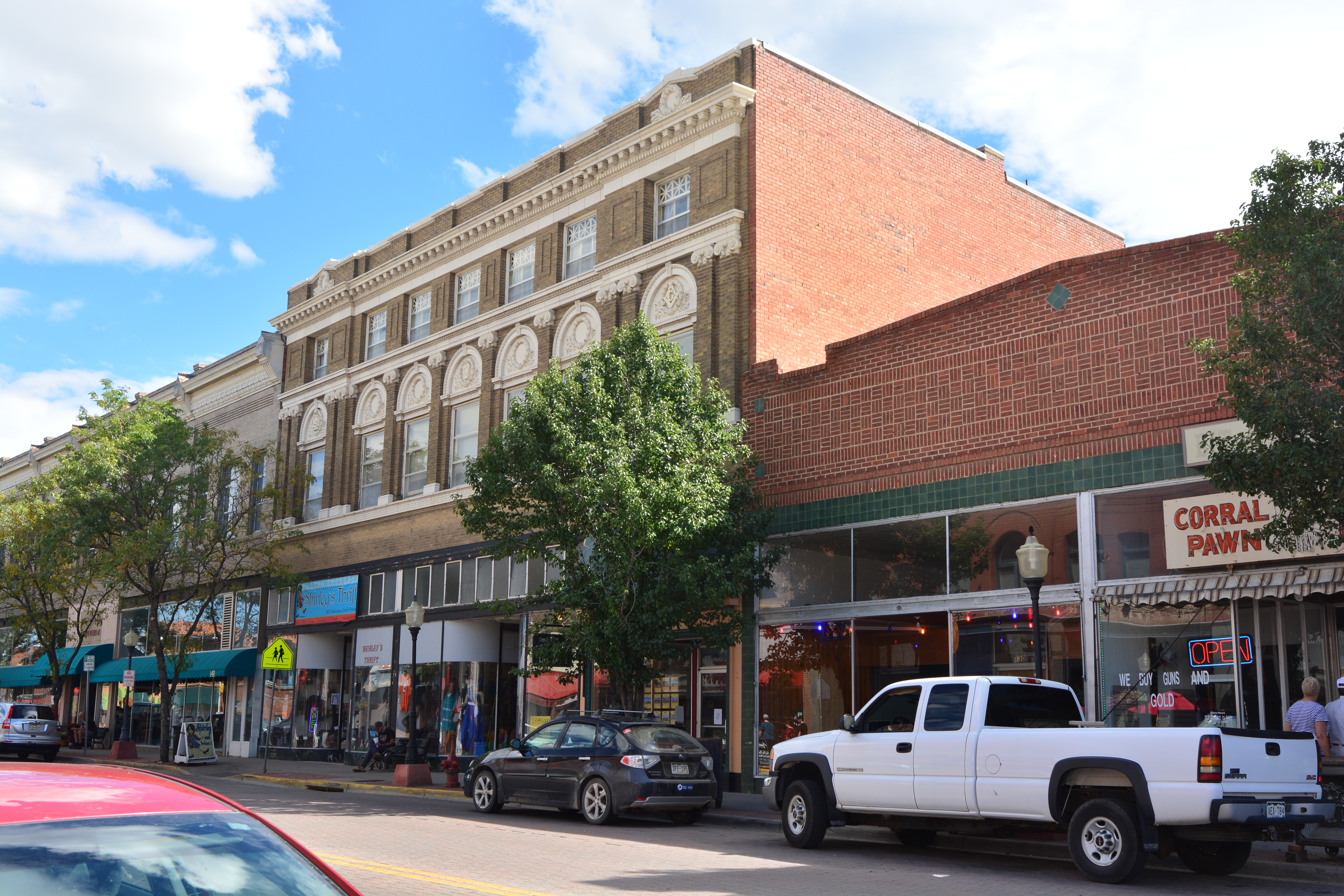
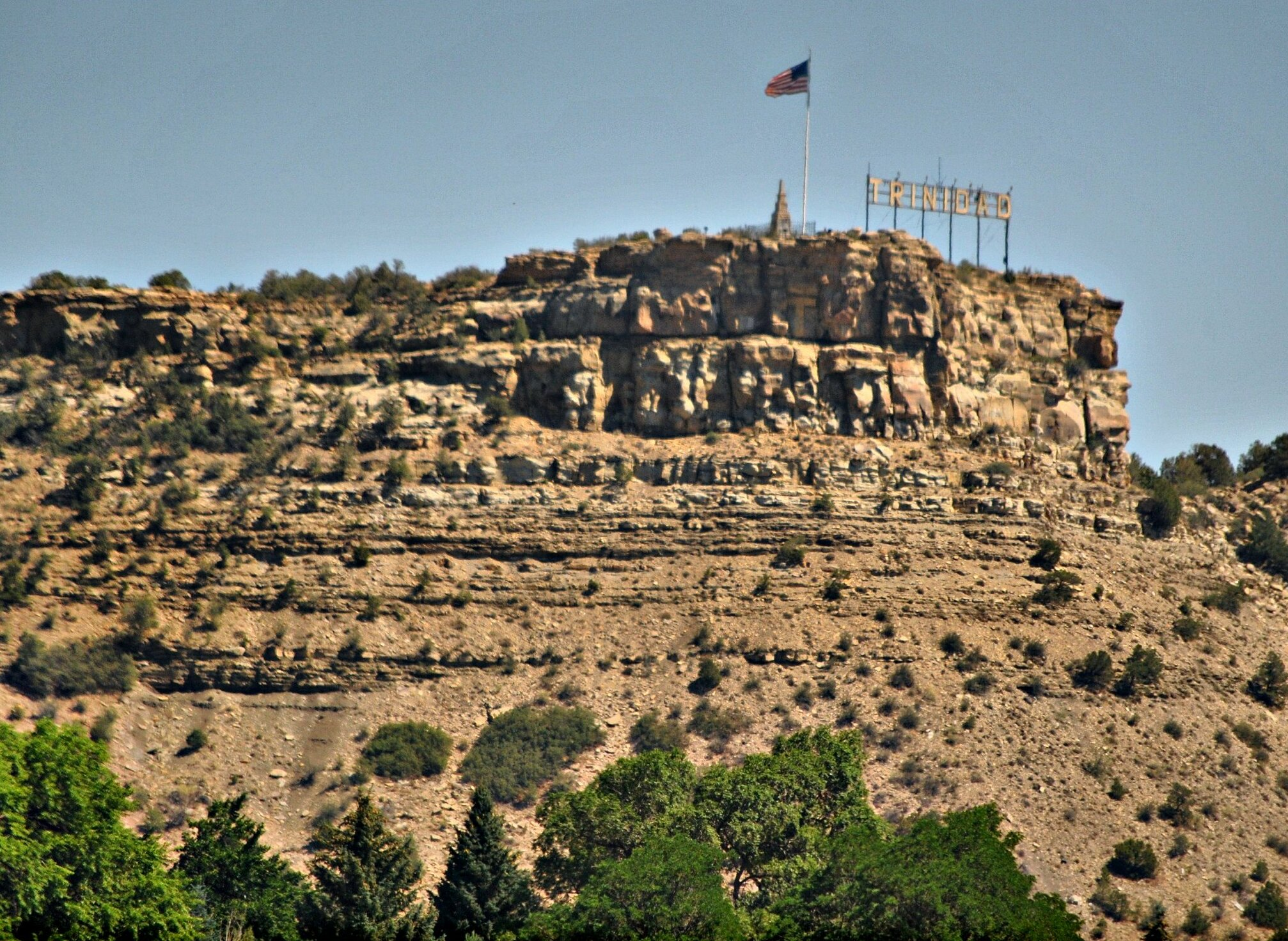
- Downtown Corazon de Trinidad Simpson's Rest

- Location of the City of Trinidad in Las Animas County, Colorado
- Coordinates: 37°10′15″N 104°30′23″W
- Country: United States
- State: Colorado
- County: Las Animas
- City: Trinidad
- Incorporated: December 30, 1879

Government
  - Type: Home rule municipality

Area
  - Total: 9.39 sq mi (24.31 km^{2})
  - Land: 9.39 sq mi (24.31 km^{2})
  - Water: 0 sq mi (0.00 km^{2})
- Elevation: 6,030 ft (1,840 m)

Population (2020)
  - Total: 8,329
  - Density: 873.8/sq mi (337.37/km^{2})
- Time zone: UTC−7 (Mountain (MST))
  - Summer (DST): UTC−6 (MDT)
- ZIP code: 81082
- Area code: 719
- FIPS code: 08-78610
- GNIS feature ID: 2412094
- Website: City Website

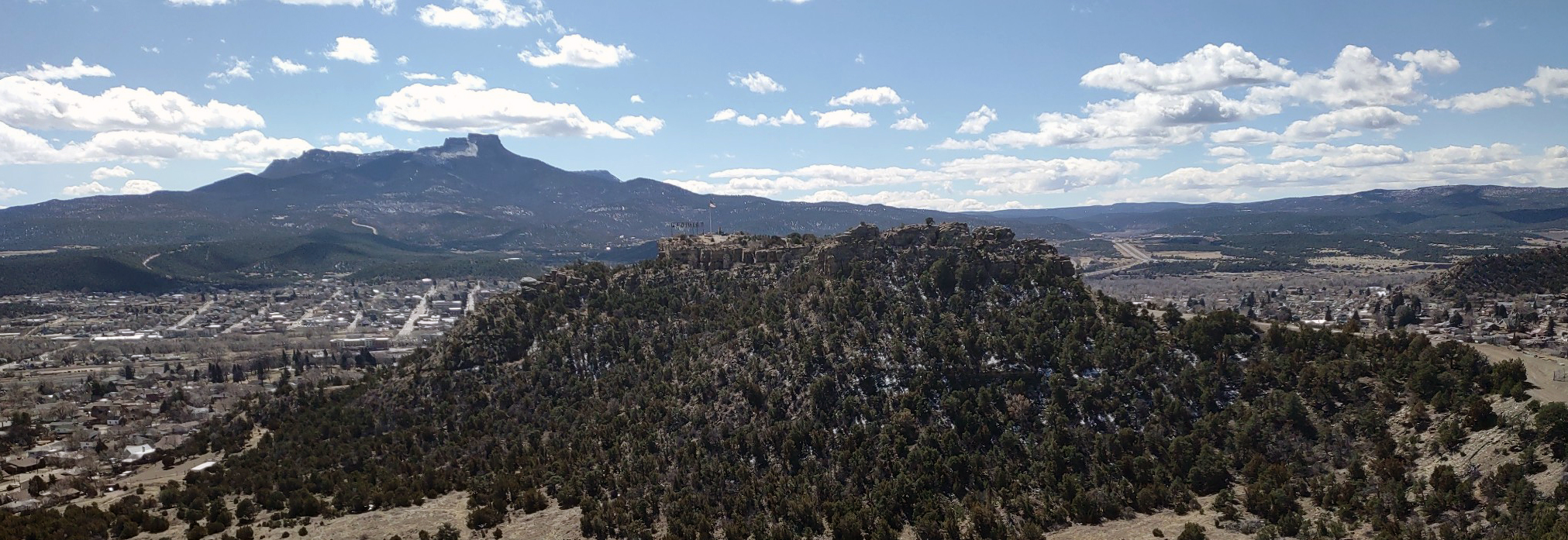
Trinidad from the Wormhole Loop Trail

Trinidad is the home rule municipality that is the county seat of and the most populous municipality in Las Animas County, Colorado, United States. The population was 8,329 as of the 2020 census. Trinidad lies 21 mi (34 km) north of Raton, New Mexico, and 195 mi (314 km) south of Denver. It is on the historic Santa Fe Trail.

The city is home to Trinidad State College, the oldest community college in Colorado. The city also houses the Trinidad Triggers, a minor-league baseball team affiliated with the independent Pecos League.

== History ==
=== Early ===
Trinidad was first explored by Spanish and Mexican traders, who liked its proximity to the Santa Fe Trail. It was founded in 1862 soon after coal was discovered in the region. This led to an influx of immigrants eager to capitalize on this natural resource. By the late 1860s, the town had about 1,200 residents. Trinidad was officially incorporated in 1876, just a few months before Colorado became a state. In 1878 the Atchison, Topeka and Santa Fe Railway reached Trinidad, making it easier for goods to be shipped from distant locations. In the 1880s Trinidad became home to a number of well-known people, including Bat Masterson, who briefly served as the town's marshal in 1882. By 1900 Trinidad's population had grown to 7,500 and it had two English-language newspapers and one in Spanish. In 1885, Holy Trinity Catholic Church was constructed.

In the early 1900s, Trinidad became nationally known for having the first woman sports editor of a newspaper, Ina Eloise Young. Her expertise was in baseball, and in 1908 she was the only woman sportswriter to cover the World Series. During the same time, Trinidad was home to a popular semiprofessional baseball team that was briefly coached by Damon Runyon.

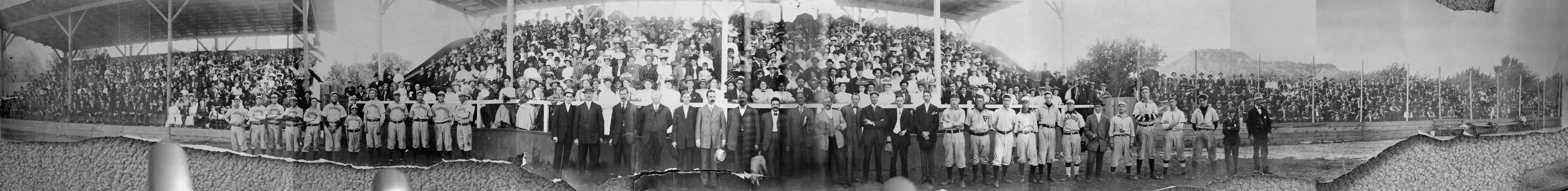
This photograph was taken in Trinidad, Colorado on Labor Day, September 2, 1907, prior to the final game of a three-game series between the Denver All Stars baseball team and the Trinidad baseball team.

On August 7, 1902, the Bowen Town coal mine, six miles north of Trinidad, experienced a horrific gas explosion, killing 13 miners. It was one of the worst mining disasters so far in the state; conditions in the mine provided the impetus for several labor strikes. At one point in late 1903, an estimated 3,000 miners, members of the United Mine Workers of America, went on strike. In 1904 Trinidad experienced several disasters. In mid-January a fire destroyed two blocks of the town's business section, causing more than $75,000 in damages. In late September, the Trinidad area and the region along the Purgatoire River endured an unusually heavy rainstorm, leading to severe flooding; the flood destroyed the Santa Fe railroad station, wiped out every bridge in town, and caused several hundred thousand dollars' worth of property damage. As Trinidad continued to grow, a number of new construction projects began in the downtown area, including a new library, a new city hall, an opera house, and a new hotel.

==== 1913–1914 strike ====
Trinidad became the a focal point of the 1913-1914 United Mine Workers of America strike against the Rockefeller-owned Colorado Fuel & Iron company, which has come to be known as the Colorado Coalfield War. The Colorado and Southern Railway stop that connected Trinidad with Denver and Walsenburg made the town strategically important for both the strikers and Colorado National Guard. On April 20, 1914, just 18 miles north of town, the events of the Ludlow Massacre occurred.

=== Late 20th century onward ===
Trinidad was dubbed the "Sex Change Capital of the World", because a local doctor had an international reputation for performing sex reassignment surgery. In the 1960s, Stanley Biber, a veteran surgeon returning from Korea, decided to move to Trinidad because he had heard that the town needed a surgeon. In 1969, a local social worker asked him to perform the surgery for her, which he learned by consulting diagrams and a New York surgeon. Biber attained a reputation as a good surgeon at a time when very few doctors were performing sex-change operations. At his peak he averaged four sex-change operations a day, and the term "taking a trip to Trinidad" became a euphemism for some seeking the procedures he offered. In 1995, Claudine Griggs published Passage through Trinidad: Journal of a Surgical Sex Change about her experience with Biber. Biber was featured in an episode of South Park, in which elementary school teacher Mr. Garrison undergoes a sex-change operation. Biber's surgical practice was taken over in 2003 by Marci Bowers. Bowers has since moved the practice to Burlingame, California. The 2008 documentary Trinidad focuses on Bowers and two of her patients.

Drop City, a counterculture artists' community, was formed in 1965 on land about 4 mi (6.4 km) north of Trinidad. Founded by art students and filmmakers from the University of Kansas and University of Colorado at Boulder, Drop City became known as the first rural "hippie commune", and received attention from Life and Time magazines, as well as from reporters around the world. Drop City was abandoned by the early 1970s, but influenced subsequent alternative-living projects across the country.

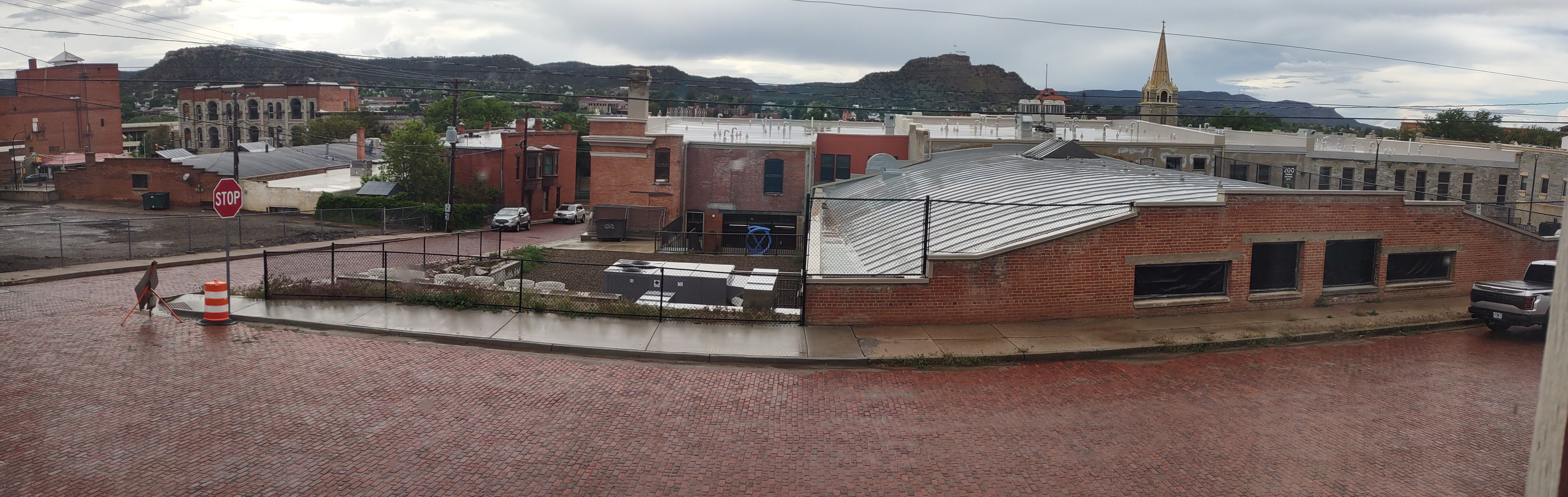
Panorama of downtown Trinidad facing west on 1st Street

In 2015, Trinidad started to experience a new boom due to the marijuana industry. The town raised $4.4 million in tax revenue from $44 million in annual marijuana sales, about 5.13% of the state's total sales. In 2018 High Times called Trinidad "Weed Town, USA", noting that its 23 licensed retail marijuana dispensaries serving less than 10,000 people amounts to one dispensary per 352 people. "In one downtown block alone along Commercial Street, there were five dispensaries in a single building in town which the owner referred to as the "World's First Pot Mini Mall", others call it the 'weed mall'.

== Geography ==
According to the United States Census Bureau, the city has a total area of 6.3 square miles (16 km^{2}), all of it land.

Trinidad is situated in the Purgatoire River valley in far southern Colorado at an elevation of 6,025 ft (1,836 m). The city lies 13 mi north of the New Mexico state line. On the northern end of the town is Simpson's Rest, a prominent bluff named for early resident George Simpson, who is buried atop it. North Avenue leads to a rut-prone county road to the top of Simpson's Rest for overviews of the city. The vista from Simpson's Rest includes Fishers Peak, a prominent mountain of 9,600 ft (2,900 m) in elevation, southeast of the city. To the northwest are the prominent Spanish Peaks.

=== Climate ===
Trinidad experiences a semiarid climate, with hot summers and cold winters. Summer days are hot, but due to Trinidad's high elevation summer nights are cool, and temperatures drop sharply after sunset. Winters are cold, but milder than in many mountain towns in Colorado. In the winter, daytime highs are usually above freezing, but temperatures below 0 °F or −17.8 °C are possible, especially at night.

Climate data for Trinidad, Colorado (1991–2020 normals, extremes 1899–present)
| Month | Jan | Feb | Mar | Apr | May | Jun | Jul | Aug | Sep | Oct | Nov | Dec | Year |
|---|---|---|---|---|---|---|---|---|---|---|---|---|---|
| Record high °F (°C) | 78 (26) | 78 (26) | 90 (32) | 90 (32) | 96 (36) | 101 (38) | 101 (38) | 99 (37) | 99 (37) | 90 (32) | 87 (31) | 82 (28) | 101 (38) |
| Mean maximum °F (°C) | 67.7 (19.8) | 68.9 (20.5) | 75.8 (24.3) | 81.3 (27.4) | 88.4 (31.3) | 96.0 (35.6) | 96.6 (35.9) | 93.5 (34.2) | 90.7 (32.6) | 84.1 (28.9) | 74.4 (23.6) | 67.9 (19.9) | 97.8 (36.6) |
| Mean daily maximum °F (°C) | 49.5 (9.7) | 51.5 (10.8) | 59.1 (15.1) | 65.6 (18.7) | 74.5 (23.6) | 84.8 (29.3) | 87.8 (31.0) | 85.5 (29.7) | 79.6 (26.4) | 69.0 (20.6) | 57.0 (13.9) | 48.5 (9.2) | 67.7 (19.8) |
| Daily mean °F (°C) | 35.7 (2.1) | 37.9 (3.3) | 45.3 (7.4) | 51.7 (10.9) | 60.8 (16.0) | 70.3 (21.3) | 74.3 (23.5) | 72.2 (22.3) | 66.0 (18.9) | 54.6 (12.6) | 43.4 (6.3) | 35.4 (1.9) | 54.0 (12.2) |
| Mean daily minimum °F (°C) | 22.0 (−5.6) | 24.3 (−4.3) | 31.5 (−0.3) | 37.8 (3.2) | 47.1 (8.4) | 55.9 (13.3) | 60.7 (15.9) | 58.9 (14.9) | 52.3 (11.3) | 40.1 (4.5) | 29.8 (−1.2) | 22.3 (−5.4) | 40.2 (4.6) |
| Mean minimum °F (°C) | 0.4 (−17.6) | 1.0 (−17.2) | 10.0 (−12.2) | 18.9 (−7.3) | 31.0 (−0.6) | 42.2 (5.7) | 50.1 (10.1) | 48.8 (9.3) | 35.5 (1.9) | 20.8 (−6.2) | 8.2 (−13.2) | −1.2 (−18.4) | −6.5 (−21.4) |
| Record low °F (°C) | −32 (−36) | −21 (−29) | −15 (−26) | −6 (−21) | 22 (−6) | 26 (−3) | 42 (6) | 37 (3) | 23 (−5) | 2 (−17) | −15 (−26) | −26 (−32) | −32 (−36) |
| Average precipitation inches (mm) | 0.54 (14) | 0.47 (12) | 1.07 (27) | 1.40 (36) | 1.52 (39) | 1.27 (32) | 2.63 (67) | 2.29 (58) | 1.27 (32) | 1.23 (31) | 0.64 (16) | 0.54 (14) | 14.87 (378) |
| Average snowfall inches (cm) | 7.7 (20) | 7.3 (19) | 9.5 (24) | 7.8 (20) | 0.5 (1.3) | 0.0 (0.0) | 0.0 (0.0) | 0.0 (0.0) | 0.1 (0.25) | 4.8 (12) | 8.3 (21) | 9.1 (23) | 55.1 (140) |
| Average precipitation days (≥ 0.01 in) | 3.5 | 4.0 | 5.5 | 6.0 | 7.0 | 6.8 | 10.4 | 10.6 | 5.9 | 4.7 | 3.8 | 4.2 | 72.4 |
| Average snowy days (≥ 0.1 in) | 2.5 | 2.8 | 2.6 | 1.8 | 0.2 | 0.0 | 0.0 | 0.0 | 0.0 | 0.9 | 1.8 | 3.3 | 15.9 |
Source: NOAA

== Demographics ==
Historical population
| Census | Pop. | Note | %± |
|---|---|---|---|
| 1870 | 562 | | — |
| 1880 | 2,226 | | 296.1% |
| 1890 | 5,523 | | 148.1% |
| 1900 | 5,345 | | −3.2% |
| 1910 | 10,204 | | 90.9% |
| 1920 | 10,906 | | 6.9% |
| 1930 | 11,732 | | 7.6% |
| 1940 | 13,223 | | 12.7% |
| 1950 | 12,204 | | −7.7% |
| 1960 | 10,691 | | −12.4% |
| 1970 | 9,901 | | −7.4% |
| 1980 | 9,663 | | −2.4% |
| 1990 | 8,580 | | −11.2% |
| 2000 | 9,078 | | 5.8% |
| 2010 | 9,096 | | 0.2% |
| 2020 | 8,329 | | −8.4% |
U.S. Decennial Census

=== 2020 census ===
As of the 2020 census, Trinidad had a population of 8,329. The median age was 44.2 years. 19.5% of residents were under the age of 18 and 23.3% of residents were 65 years of age or older. For every 100 females there were 98.1 males, and for every 100 females age 18 and over there were 96.1 males age 18 and over.

96.4% of residents lived in urban areas, while 3.6% lived in rural areas.

There were 3,734 households in Trinidad, of which 24.1% had children under the age of 18 living in them. Of all households, 35.0% were married-couple households, 25.8% were households with a male householder and no spouse or partner present, and 32.0% were households with a female householder and no spouse or partner present. About 38.0% of all households were made up of individuals and 17.5% had someone living alone who was 65 years of age or older.

There were 4,299 housing units, of which 13.1% were vacant. The homeowner vacancy rate was 2.1% and the rental vacancy rate was 10.6%.

Racial composition as of the 2020 census
| Race | Number | Percent |
|---|---|---|
| White | 5,475 | 65.7% |
| Black or African American | 108 | 1.3% |
| American Indian and Alaska Native | 232 | 2.8% |
| Asian | 81 | 1.0% |
| Native Hawaiian and Other Pacific Islander | 13 | 0.2% |
| Some other race | 1,024 | 12.3% |
| Two or more races | 1,396 | 16.8% |
| Hispanic or Latino (of any race) | 3,867 | 46.4% |

=== 2000 census ===
As of the 2000 census, 9,078 people, 3,701 households, and 2,335 families resided in the city. The population density was 1,439.4 inhabitants per square mile (555.8/km^{2}). The 4,126 housing units averaged 654.2 units per square mile (252.6 units/km^{2}). The racial makeup of the city was 79.97% White, 0.54% African American, 3.02% Native American, 0.43% Asian, 0.14% Pacific Islander, 12.12% from other races, and 3.78% from two or more races. Hispanics or Latinos of any race were 48.07% of the population.

Of the 3,701 households, 29.5% had children under the age of 18 living with them, 43.6% were married couples living together, 14.5% had a female householder with no husband present, and 36.9% were not families; 32.7% of all households were made up of individuals, and 16.2% had someone living alone who was 65 years of age or older. The average household size was 2.36 and the average family size was 2.98.

In the city, the population was distributed as 24.9% under the age of 18, 9.4% from 18 to 24, 24.2% from 25 to 44, 22.6% from 45 to 64, and 18.9% who were 65 years of age or older. The median age was 39 years. For every 100 females, there were 92.5 males. For every 100 females age 18 and over, there were 89.8 males.

The median income for a household in the city was $36,681, and for a family was $33,992. Males had a median income of $27,817 versus $19,064 for females. The per capita income for the city was $17,271. About 16.2% of families and 18.3% of the population were below the poverty line, including 19.6% of those under age 18 and 20% of those age 65 or over.

== Economy ==
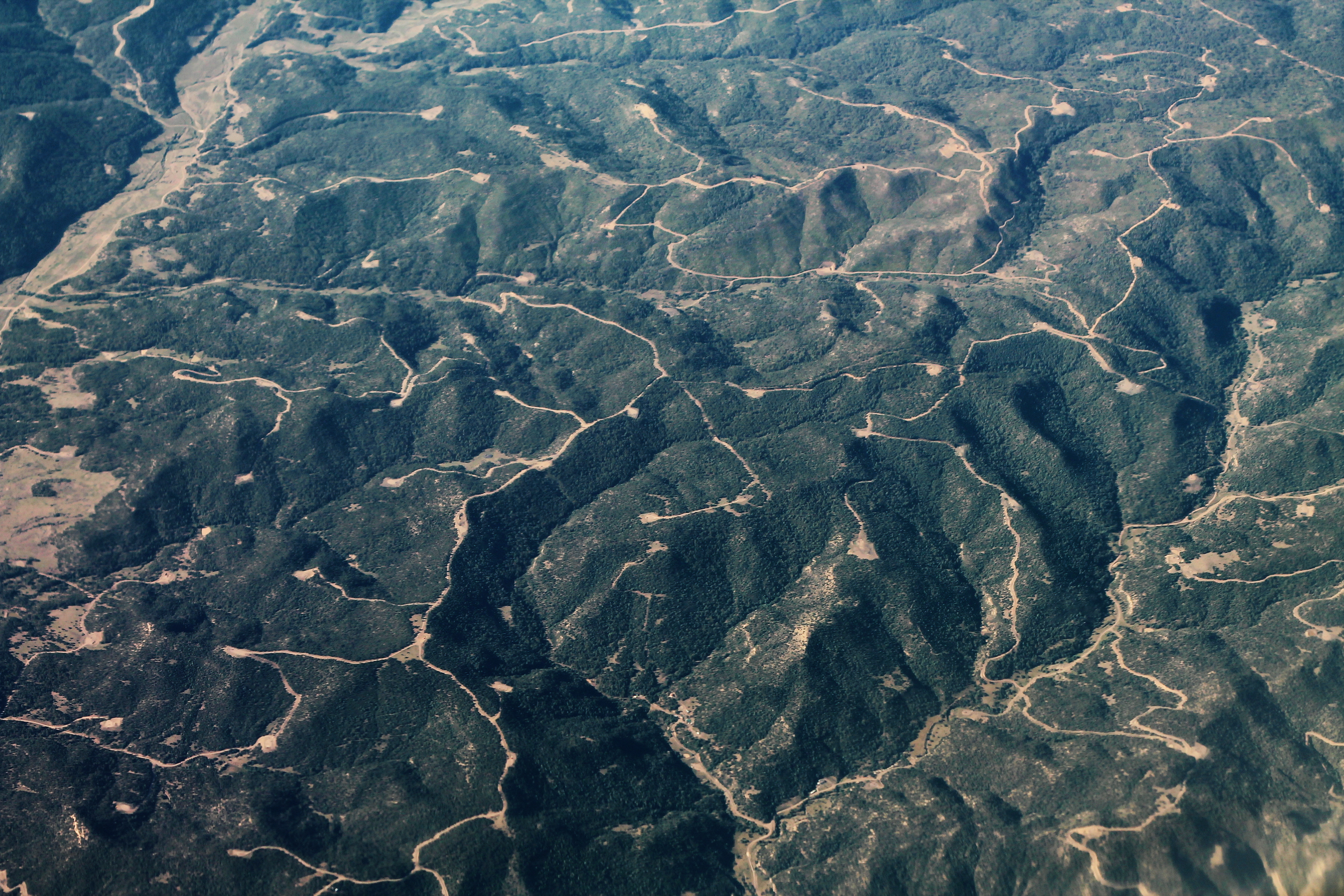
Gas fields southwest of Trinidad

For many years Trinidad housed the miners who worked in the coal mines of the Raton Basin south and west of the town. Major operators included Colorado Fuel and Iron and Victor-American Fuel Company. The mines are now closed, but since the 1980s companies have been drilling new gas wells to extract coalbed methane from the remaining coal seams.

Trinidad's location at the foot of Raton Pass, along the Santa Fe Trail between St. Joseph, Missouri, and Santa Fe, New Mexico, is a preferred route for travelers, first by foot, then horse and ox-drawn wagon, then railroad. Interstate 25 is the most highly traveled route between Colorado and New Mexico and bisects Trinidad.

In the early 20th century, Trinidad was the closest town to what many consider the beginning of the labor movement. Later that century the town saw swings of boom and bust as the oil industry heated and cooled.

== Transportation ==
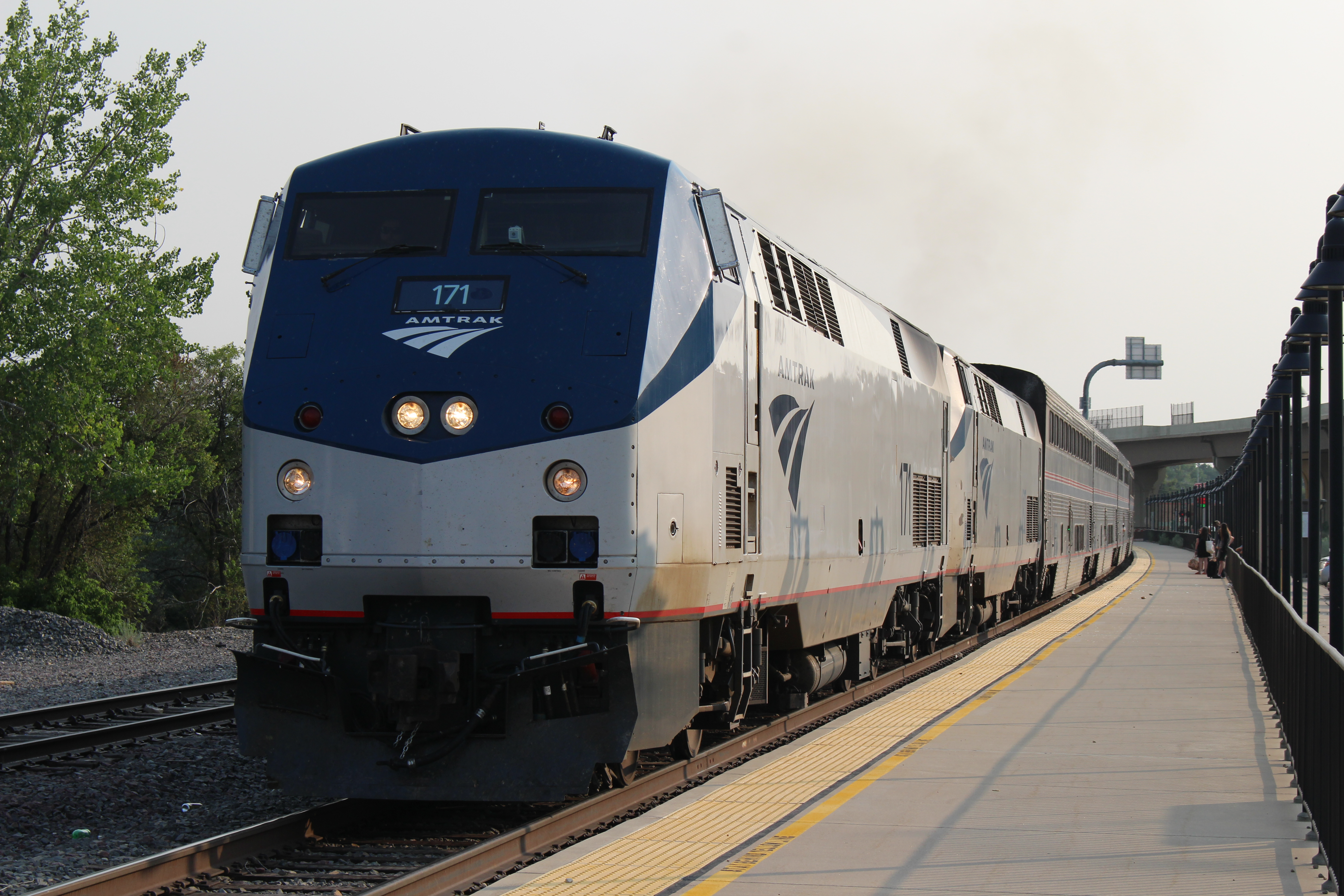
The Amtrak Southwest Chief at Trinidad station

=== Road ===
- I-25
- US 160

=== Rail ===
- Trinidad Station, served by the Southwest Chief
- Junction of BNSF Railway's Raton Subdivision, Twin Peaks Subdivision, and Spanish Peaks Subdivision

=== Air ===
- Perry Stokes Airport

=== Bus ===
- South Central Council of Governments operates demand-responsive transport in Trinidad.
- Greyhound Lines serves Trinidad on its route between Denver and Albuquerque.
- Limousine Express serves Trinidad on its route between Denver and El Paso.
- Trinidad is part of Colorado's Bustang network. It is on the Trinidad-Pueblo Outrider line.

== Education ==
Trinidad is served by Trinidad School District #1. The district operates three schools:

- Fisher's Peak Elementary School
- Trinidad Middle School
- Trinidad High School

Trinidad is also home to Trinidad State College, a public community college serving over 1,600 students annually.

== Sports ==
The Trinidad Triggers are a professional baseball team in the independent Pecos League which is not affiliated with Major League Baseball or Minor League Baseball. They play their home games at Trinidad Central Park.

== Notable people ==
- P. O. Ackley, Gunsmith
- Buster Adams, major league outfielder
- Felipe Baca, early settler
- Casimiro Barela, State Senator, served as Justice of Peace in Trinidad
- Stanley Biber (1923–2006), physician
- Martin Bowden (1884–1958), canyon artist known for large-scale rock art along the Purgatoire River
- Marci Bowers, physician
- Dana B. Chase (1848–1897), photographer
- Bennett Cohen (1890–1964), film director
- John Gagliardi, a native, NCAA all-time, all-division winningest football coach
- Erick Hawkins, modern-dance choreographer and dancer, born in Trinidad
- Snatam Kaur, singer of Sikh religious music, born in Trinidad
- Cissy King, dancer on The Lawrence Welk Show, born in Trinidad
- Ronnie Lane, rock musician, lived in Trinidad during final years of his life
- Bat Masterson, gunman, town marshal of Trinidad during the 1880s; his brother Jim was also town marshal during the 1880s
- M. Mike Miller, travel writer and eight-term member of the Alaska House of Representatives, born in Trinidad
- Arthur Roy Mitchell, Western artist, Trinidad native; the Mitchell Museum houses many of his major works
- Erskine Sanford, actor, notable for his work with Orson Welles in films such as Citizen Kane
- Alice Ivers Tubbs, frontier gambler known as "Poker Alice"
- Thomas Wilson, composer, born in Trinidad in 1927, lived there 17 months before moving to Glasgow
- Ed Wolff, actor and circus giant
- Ina Eloise Young, first female sports editor

== See also ==
- National Old Trails Road
- Raton Pass
- Santa Fe National Historic Trail
- Spanish Peaks
