= Ina Eloise Young =

First American woman sports editor

Ina Eloise Young in 1907

Ina Eloise Young (February 22, 1881, Brownwood, Texas – May 2, 1949, Arlington, Virginia) is widely regarded to have been the first American woman sports editor when she started working as 'sporting editor' for The Chronicle-News of Trinidad, Colorado in 1906. In 1908, she became the first woman to cover the World Series which was then known as the World's Championship Games.

== Career ==
Although Ina was listed as Society Editor, Chronicle-News in the Trinidad, Colorado City Directory of 1907, she also reported on sports, particularly baseball, and was named sporting editor of the paper in 1906. At the time, Trinidad was a thriving mining town and attending a baseball game was a popular pastime for the populace of approximately 10,000. None of the reporters at The Chronicle-News knew very much about baseball or how to keep a box score but Ina was an expert because she had played baseball and learned all about the game from her little brother Robert. Thus, Ina became the paper's baseball reporter and her box scores were judged to be perfect.

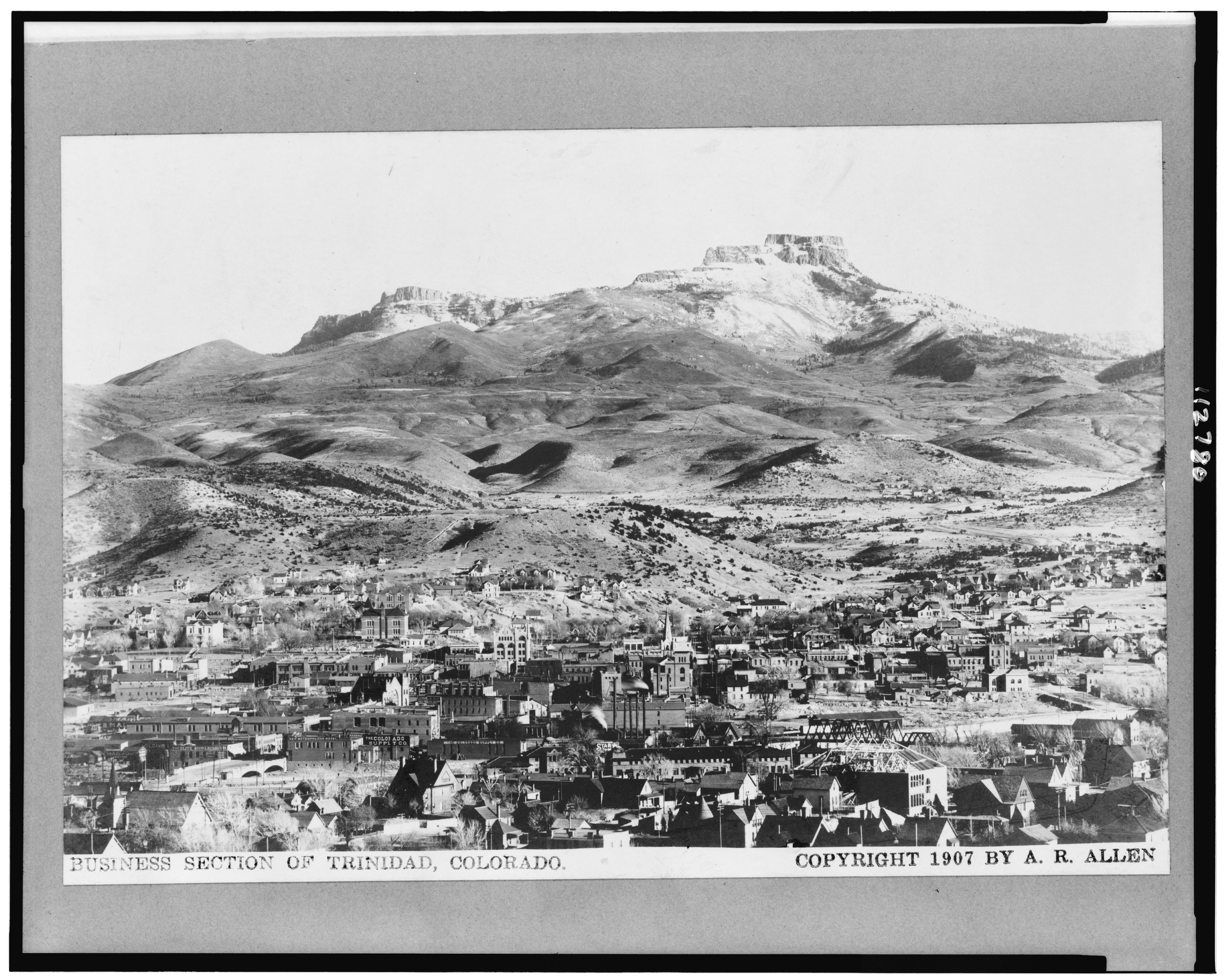
Business section of Trinidad, Colorado

Alfred Damon Runyon, who himself had been the sporting editor of The Rocky Mountain News in Denver, Colorado tried to establish a professional baseball league in Colorado in 1907 by attracting talented amateurs from around the country to play against some of the established teams in the state. Over Labor Day weekend in 1907, an All Star team from Denver consisting of at least two players from Chicago, played a three-game series against Trinidad's baseball team.

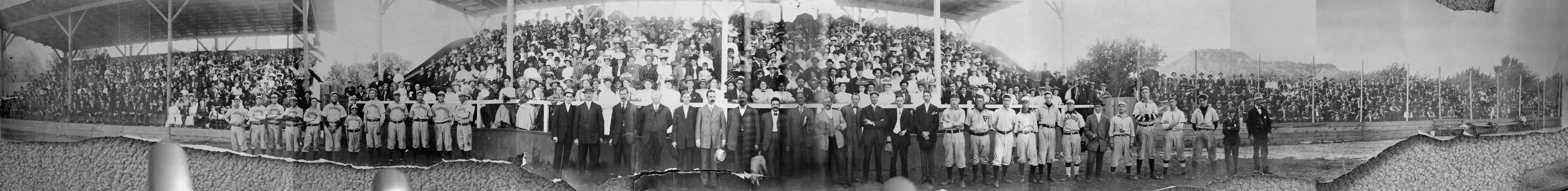
This photograph was taken in Trinidad, Colorado on Labor Day, 2 September 1907 prior to the final game of a three-game series between the Denver All Stars baseball team and the Trinidad baseball team.

1,500 people (~15% of the town) attended the final game. In the photograph to the right taken before the final game on Labor Day, it is likely by comparison to known photographs of her that Ina Eloise Young is sitting in the center of the front row, above the white dog, with her mother and father seated on her left. The presence of the horse whip that she always carried also suggests it is Ina in the photograph. Damon Runyon is possibly standing on the far left with the other dignitaries in the front-center of the photograph.

At the 1908 World's Championship Games (World Series), Tim Murnane of The Boston Globe stated the following: "At one game in Detroit I was sandwiched between two celebrated characters. On one side was Battling Nelson, the man of jabs and uppercuts, on the other side was Miss Ina E. Young, representing a Trinidad, Colo. newspaper...Miss Young proved an excellent scorer, was familiar with every inside play and surprised me with the knowledge of the game. The lady was making a tour of the east reporting the important baseball and football games for the enterprising Colorado papers." After the Cubs' series victory in 1908, treasurer Tim Murnane of the newly formed Baseball Writers Association nominated Ina as an honorary member. She was approved and gained access to all American and National League ballparks with her membership.

After her time as sporting editor of the Chronicle-News in Trinidad, Colorado, Ina worked for the Fort Worth Record in Texas and The Denver Post in Colorado. She also covered the 1911 World Series.

== Life ==
Ina Eloise Young was born in Brownwood, Texas on February 22, 1881. Her parents were Louisa and Robert Young. Ina was a middle child with an older sister Zoe (born 1879) and a younger brother Robert Jr. (born 1883). By 1889, the Young family resided in Trinidad, Colorado where Ina grew up riding horses and was frequently pictured holding her riding crop. "I ride horseback, but all western girls do that. In covering events that happen in the mining camps around here a horse is the quickest method of transportation." Ina played basketball and fenced at the University of Colorado at Boulder but despite good grades, left college and began working at the Chronicle-News in Trinidad. In 1904, she met her future husband Carleton Kelley, a National Guardsman, while covering a miners strike. After the wedding, they resided in Denver and Ina Kelley worked at The Denver Post and was also the official scorer for the Grizzlies, a minor league baseball team. In 1912, they moved to Riverside, California. The Kelleys had two daughters, Kathleen and Patricia. Ina died on May 2, 1949, at the home of her daughter Patricia in Arlington, Virginia.

== In her own words ==
Why, you see, it was this way. When I got through college the thing I knew most was sport. I knew baseball because my only brother had taught me that, I knew football, of course, from going to every game played at the University of Colorado while I was there, I knew golf and tennis, and I knew a lot about racing because my father was always keen about that, and I had heard it talked all my life. When five years ago I left college and began newspaper work, they set me to doing society. Well, I did it because there was no way out of it. But when they promoted me to suicides, murders, mine explosions and such things I breathed a silent prayer of thanksgiving. I did most of that strike out there in the mines alone, until the militia came in and the officers were afraid to have me go without an escort. I ride horseback and go everywhere that way. You know how a newspaper is - sometimes the right man is gone and they have to put in the wrong one. Well, out west they think more of women's ability than they do here, I guess. Anyway, they gave me a chance at sport. I love writing it. I have two assistants and we get along beautifully. No suffrage for me, thank you. Men rule the world and I guess they're going to for a while yet. They've been mighty good to me. I know, and if women had my destiny in their keeping I don't fancy I'd have such a good time as I do. I wouldn't change my place with any woman I know. My sister is a society girl-but I'm as happy and independent as a lark. They give me a big salary, six weeks vacation, my expenses paid all over with the ball team, and as courteous, considerate treatment, commend me to the sporting fraternity. Instinctively they know how to treat a woman. I ask no better society than that of sporting men. I've written up pugilists and prize fights, but I've yet to see one. Squeamish about it? Oh, no. I intend to see Battling Nelson at my first opportunity. Pugilists are manly and fine and brave, just like all other sporting men.
