= Raton Pass =

Mountain pass in Colorado and New Mexico, USA

Ratón Pass
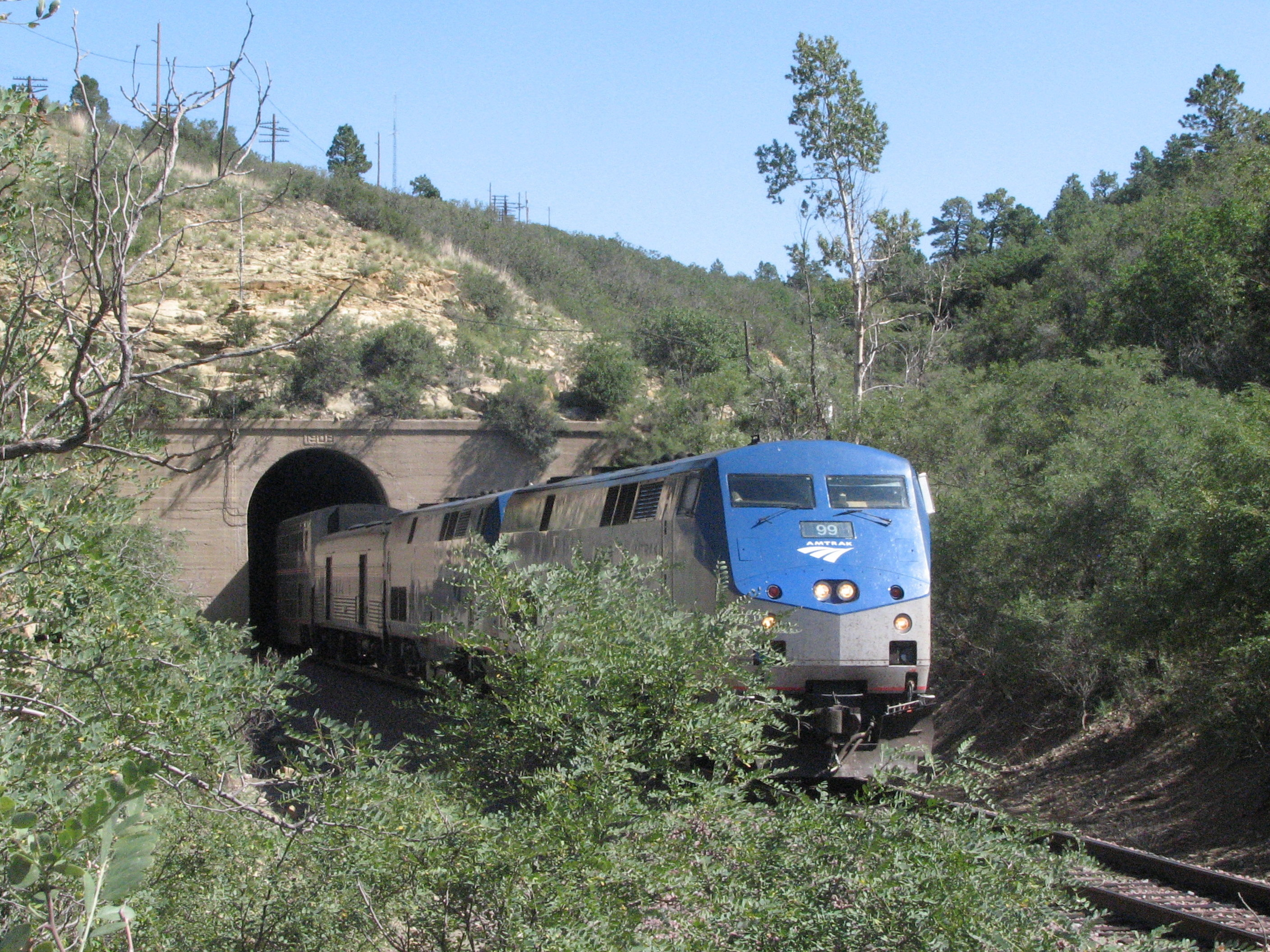
- Amtrak's Southwest Chief westbound out of the Raton Tunnel near the summit of Raton Pass

- Location within Colorado Location within New Mexico
- Elevation: 7,834 ft (2,388 m)
- Traversed by: I-25 / US 85 / US 87, Burlington Northern Santa Fe Railroad

Third Approach
- Location: Colfax County, New Mexico and Las Animas County, Colorado, US
- Coordinates: 36°59′28″N 104°29′12″W
- Topo map: Ratón
- Raton Pass
- U.S. National Register of Historic Places
- U.S. National Historic Landmark
- Colorado State Register of Historic Properties
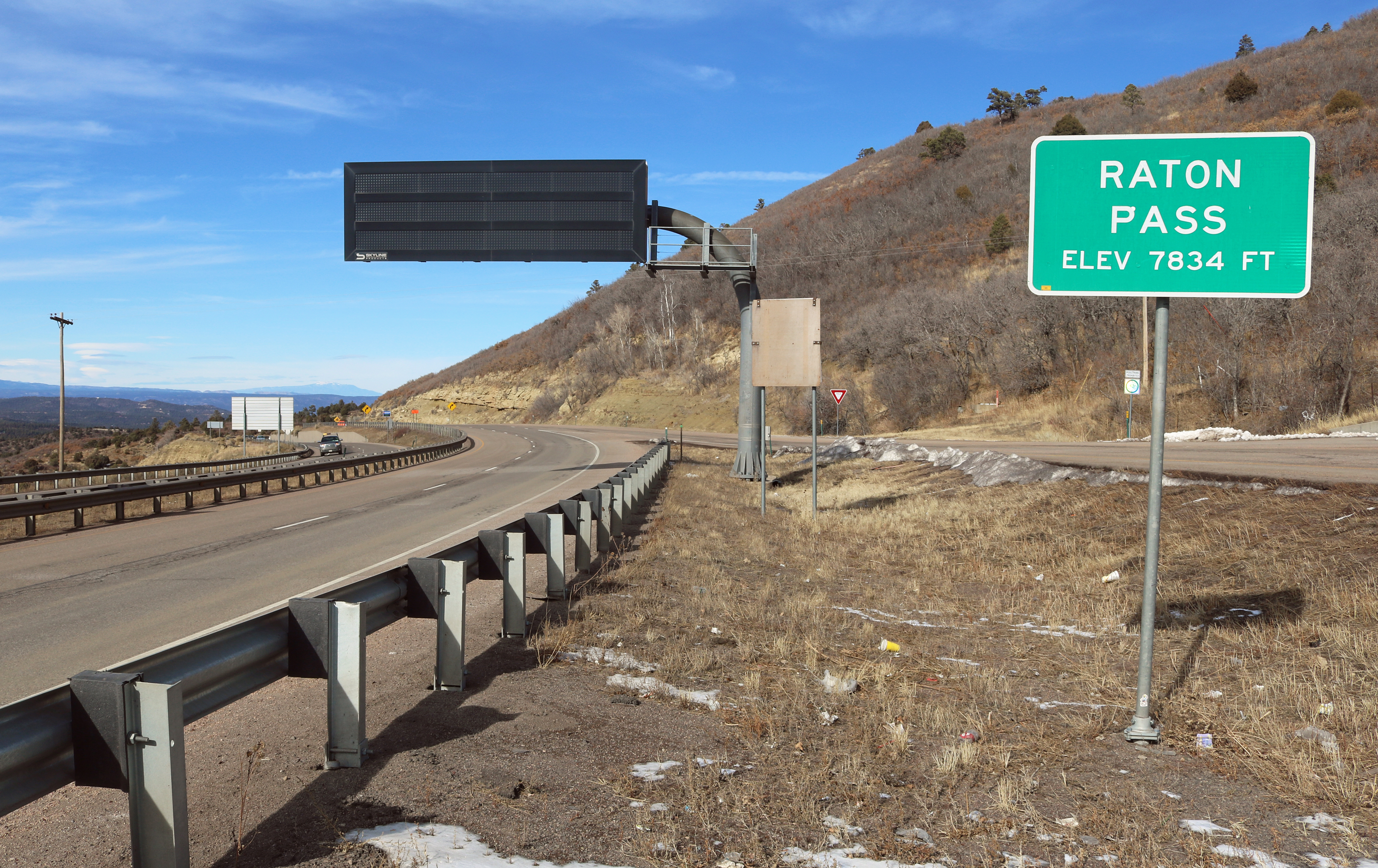
- Looking north from the top of Raton Pass
- Nearest city: Trinidad, Colorado, Raton, New Mexico
- Area: 1,520 acres (620 ha)
- Built: 1866
- NRHP reference No.: 66000474
- CSRHP No.: 5LA.2182

Significant dates
- Added to NRHP: October 15, 1966
- Designated NHL: December 19, 1960

Ratón Pass is a 7,834 ft (2,388 m) elevation mountain pass on the Colorado–New Mexico border in the western United States. It is located on the eastern side of the Sangre de Cristo Mountains between Trinidad, Colorado and Raton, New Mexico, approximately 180 miles (290 km) northeast of Santa Fe. Ratón is Spanish for "mouse". The pass crosses the line of volcanic mesas that extends east from the Sangre de Cristo Mountains along the state line, and furnishes the most direct land route between the valley of the Arkansas River to the north and the upper valley of the Canadian River, leading toward Santa Fe, to the south. The pass now carries Interstate 25 and railroad tracks.

The pass is a historically significant landmark on the Santa Fe Trail, a major 19th-century settlement route between Kansas City, Missouri and Santa Fe. It was designated a National Historic Landmark in 1960 for this association.

== History ==
In 1846, during the Mexican–American War, Stephen W. Kearny and his troops passed through the pass en route to New Mexico. During the Civil War, it was the primary path into New Mexico since it avoided Confederate raiders. It was later developed into a toll road by Richens Lacey Wootton.

=== Railroad route ===
In the late 19th century, Raton Pass was the Atchison, Topeka and Santa Fe Railway's (AT&SF) primary route through the mountains. Along with Royal Gorge in Colorado, the pass was one of the focal points for the 1878–79 Railroad Wars between the AT&SF and the smaller Denver and Rio Grande Railroad. The route over the pass has gradients of up to 3.5% and a tunnel at its highest point, 7,588 ft (2,313 m) above sea level. The tunnel is in New Mexico, but just barely so, with its northern portal lying only a few feet south of the Colorado border.

The route is now owned by BNSF, which absorbed the AT&SF in 1996. While it is still used by Amtrak's Chicago–Los Angeles Southwest Chief, freight traffic shifted from Raton Pass to the Belen Cutoff (1908), whose gradients do not exceed 1.25%. As a result, with Raton Pass having little to no freight traffic, BNSF said in 2012 that they could not justify maintenance of the route to Amtrak's standards between La Junta, Colorado, and Lamy, New Mexico, placing the future of rail transportation over the pass in jeopardy.

=== Highway route ===
In the 20th century, the pass was used as the route of U.S. Routes 85 and 87, and later, Interstate 25 between Denver and Albuquerque. At 7,834 ft (2,388 m) above sea level, the highway is subject to difficult driving conditions and occasional closures during heavy winter snowfalls.

== In popular culture ==
Clint Black makes reference to the Raton Pass in the song "The Goodnight-Loving" from the 1990 album "Put Yourself in My Shoes."

Ridin' against the wind in east New Mexico,
His skin is dry and worn as the Texas plains.
He's headed where the air is thin and the cold blue northers blow,
Up through the Raton Pass, but he'll have to beat the early snow

Townes Van Zandt features Raton Pass in the chorus to his song "Snowin' on Raton" from the 1987 album "At My Window."

It's snowin' on Raton.
Come morning I'll be through them hills and gone.

== Gallery ==
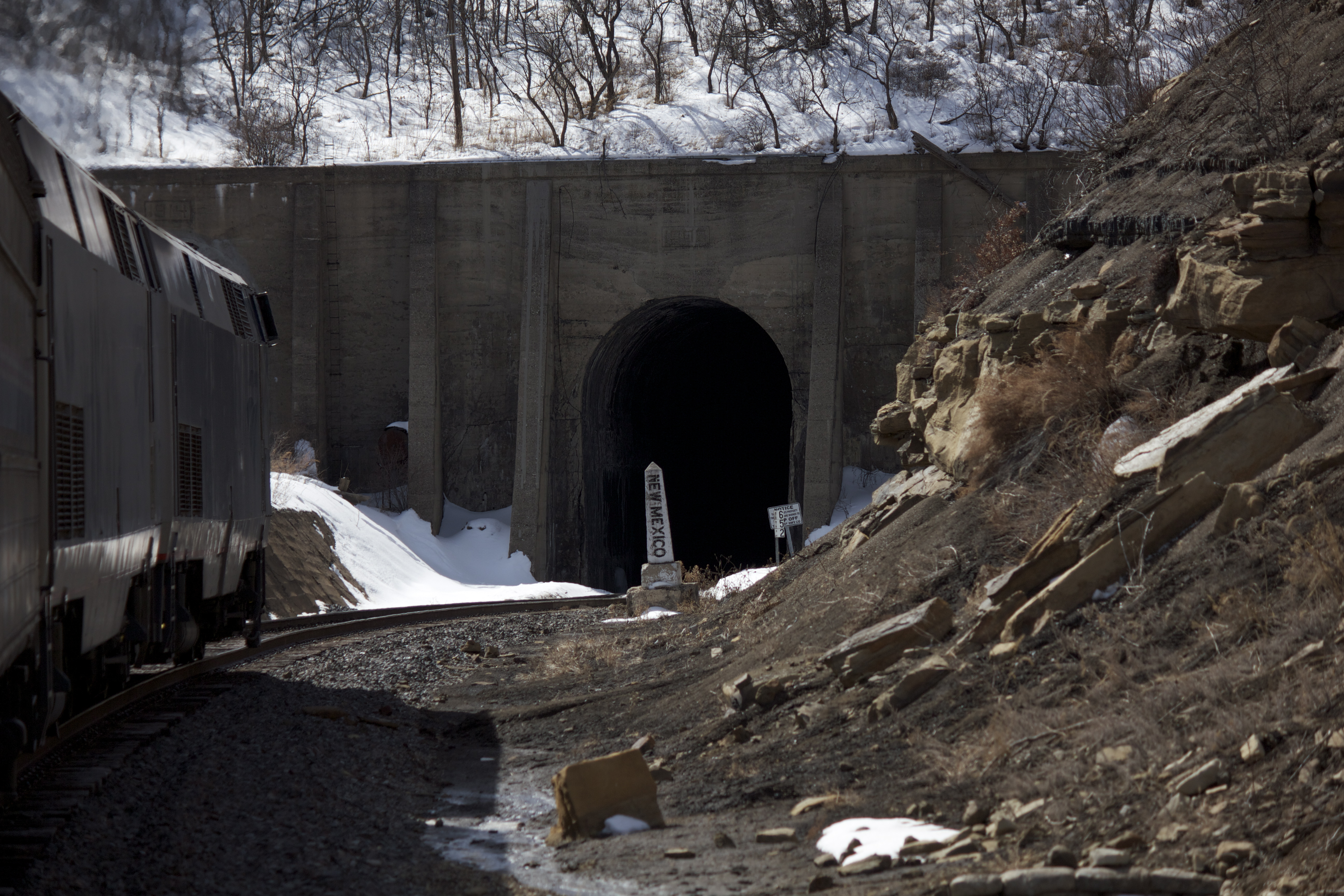
Amtrak's Southwest Chief entering the north end of the tunnel

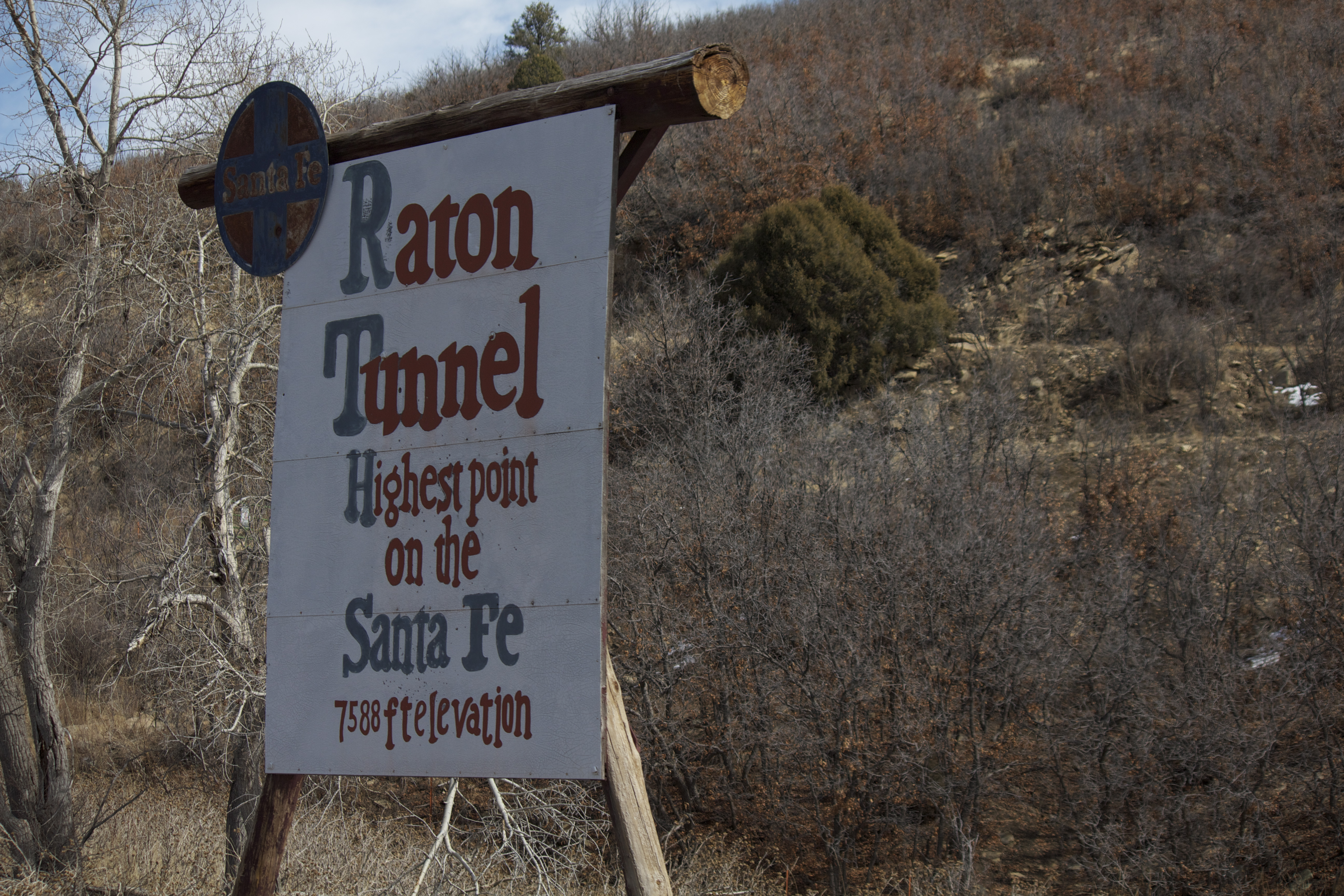
Sign marking the elevation of the Raton Pass tunnel

== See also ==
- National Register of Historic Places listings in Las Animas County, Colorado
- National Register of Historic Places listings in Colfax County, New Mexico
- List of National Historic Landmarks in Colorado
- List of National Historic Landmarks in New Mexico
