= List of post offices in Colorado: G–O =

Coordinates: 38.9972°N 105.5478°W

The 64 counties of the U.S. State of Colorado

This is a list of United States post offices which currently operate, or previously operated, in the area of the State of Colorado. For post offices currently in operation: the first ZIP Code is the ZIP Code of the postmaster. The postal service requires that each post office name be unique within a state or territory, however the name of a post office that closed or changed its name may be reused for another post office.

- See the List of populated places in Colorado for location information.
- See the List of ZIP Codes in Colorado for currently assigned 5-digit ZIP Codes.

Visual guide
Post offices currently in operation
Post offices that have been renamed
Postal addresses now served by another post office
Former post offices

Colorado post offices: A B C D E F G H I J K L M N O P Q R S T U V W X Y Z

== A–F ==
- List of post offices in Colorado from A through F

== G ==
Select the OpenStreetMap link at the right to view the location of some of the post offices in this section.

Post office	Current county	ZIP Code	Date opened	Date closed
Gabbert	Ouray		Apr 22, 1898	Oct 14, 1903
Galatea	Kiowa		Dec 22, 1887	Jul 31, 1948
Galena	Fremont	81252	Feb 16, 1877	Jun 08, 1877
Galena	Fremont	81252	Aug 25, 1879	Nov 04, 1885
Galeton (Note: The Zita, Colorado, post office was renamed Galeton on September 16, 1910.)	Weld	80622	Sep 16, 1910	open
Garcia (Note: The village of La Plaza de los Manzanares, Territorio de Nuevo México, was originally settled in 1849, but was later known for its remaining family, Los Garcias. The Manzanares, Colorado, post office operated from February 19, 1901, until March 31, 1902, but reopened as Garcia on February 6, 1915.)	Costilla	81152	Feb 06, 1915	Jul 03, 1964
Garden City	Weld	80631		
Gardner (Note: The Huerfano Canyon, Colorado Territory, post office was renamed Gardner on December 15, 1871.)	Huerfano	81040	Dec 15, 1871	open
Garfield	Chaffee	81201	Jul 08, 1880	Nov 09, 1889
Garfield	Chaffee	81201	Jan 11, 1905	Feb 28, 1911
Garfield	Chaffee	81201	Sep 09, 1911	Dec 30, 1963
Garibaldi (Note: The Garibaldi, Colorado Territory, post office was renamed Villa Grove on January 19, 1872, was then respelled Villagrove on October 12, 1894, but was then changed back to Villa Grove on July 01, 1950.)	Saguache	81155	Jun 13, 1870	Jan 19, 1872
Garland	Costilla		Jul 24, 1877	Jun 27, 1878
Garnett	Alamosa		Mar 03, 1888	Sep 30, 1921
Garo	Park		Jun 29, 1880	Feb 28, 1955
Garrison (Note: The Garrison, Colorado, post office was renamed Hooper in 1896.)	Alamosa	81136	Jan 26, 1891	Jul 17, 1896
Gary (Note: The Gilsonite, Colorado, post office was renamed Gary.)	Mesa		NA	Aug 30, 1985
Gary	Morgan	80723	Feb 07, 1899	May 31, 1954
Gaskil	Grand		Oct 22, 1880	Nov 11, 1886
Gateview	Gunnison	81230	Mar 11, 1892	Nov 07, 1895
Gateway	Mesa	81522	Apr 25, 1903	Jul 29, 1903
Gateway	Mesa	81522	Jul 16, 1904	open
Gault	Weld		Jul 13, 1900	Oct 31, 1916
Gavin	Mesa		Sep 26, 1916	Jul 31, 1917
Geary	Weld		May 21, 1888	Jun 30, 1894
Gebhard (Note: The Gebhard, Colorado, post office was renamed Agate on April 24, 1882.)	Elbert	80101	Apr 08, 1881	Apr 24, 0182
Gem	Bent		Aug 30, 1907	May 31, 1913
Genoa (Note: The Cable, Colorado, post office was renamed Genoa on January 30, 1895.)	Lincoln	80818	Jan 30, 1895	Jun 29, 1895
Genoa	Lincoln	80818	Mar 31, 1903	open
Georgetown	Clear Creek	80444	Jun 19, 1866	open
Gerbazdale (Note: The Watson, Colorado, post office was renamed Gerbazdale on June 14, 1918.)	Pitkin		Jun 14, 1918	Aug 10, 1918
Gibson	Saguache		Dec 01, 1911	Aug 14, 1923
Gilcrest (Note: The Nantes, Colorado, post office closed on February 9, 1888, but reopened as Gilcrest on May 17, 1907.)	Weld	80623	May 17, 1907	open
Gill	Weld	80624	Dec 27, 1910	open
Gillespie	Jefferson		May 24, 1890	Jun 20, 1894
Gillett	Teller		Aug 29, 1894	Jun 15, 1908
Gillett	Teller		Feb 02, 1909	Mar 15, 1913
Gillette	Las Animas		Jul 02, 1888	Oct 20, 1888
Gilman	Eagle	81645	Nov 03, 1886	Apr 22, 1986
Gilman (Note: The Doyleville, Colorado, post office was renamed Gilman on April 9, 1882, but was then changed back to Doyleville on March 24, 1883.)	Gunnison	81230	Sep 04, 1882	Feb 05, 1883
Gilman	Jefferson		Dec 17, 1874	Aug 08, 1876
Gilpin	Gilpin	80422	Apr 07, 1897	Sep 29, 1917
Gilsonite	Mesa	81524	May 18, 1957	Feb 09, 1966
Girard	Lincoln		Mar 22, 1912	Nov 30, 1917
Glacier	Gunnison		Apr 20, 1914	Nov 30, 1915
Glacier Lake	Boulder		Mar 03, 1906	Aug 15, 1908
Glade Park	Mesa	81523	Nov 11, 1910	open
Gladel (Note: The Gladel, Colorado, post office closed on May 31, 1929, but reopened as the Slick Rock post office on May 1, 1941.)	San Miguel	81325	Dec 14, 1922	May 31, 1929
Gladstone	San Juan		Jan 24, 1878	Nov 06, 1879
Gladstone	San Juan		Jun 25, 1883	Dec 17, 1887
Gladstone	San Juan		Jun 17, 1898	Jan 15, 1912
Gladwyn	Archuleta		Aug 02, 1885	Apr 14, 1890
Glen	Washington		Jun 25, 1905	May 31, 1920
Glen Grove	Douglas		Nov 29, 1869	Jul 24, 1877
Glen Haven	Larimer	80532	May 28, 1917	Jul 31, 1919
Glen Haven	Larimer	80532	May 26, 1922	Jul 31, 1924
Glen Haven	Larimer	80532	May 18, 1926	open
Glendale	Arapahoe	80246		
Glendale (Note: The Glendale, Colorado, post office in Fremont County was renamed Penrose on May 8, 1909.)	Fremont		Dec 28, 1877	May 08, 1909
Glendevey	Larimer		May 19, 1902	Jan 31, 1975
Gleneath	El Paso		Oct 22, 1910	Jul 31, 1916
Gleneyre	Larimer		Jun 16, 1895	Apr 30, 1912
Glenham (Note: The Glenham, Colorado Territory, post office was renamed Barela on July 28, 1874.)	Las Animas	81081	May 19, 1873	Jul 28, 1874
Glenn	El Paso		Sep 23, 1896	Jul 31, 1901
Glenn	El Paso		Jun 15, 1903	Dec 05, 1903
Glentivar	Park	80827	Apr 13, 1921	Nov 30, 1929
Glentivar	Park	80827	Dec 1935	Feb 28, 1955
Glenwood Springs (Note: Barlow, Colorado, was previously known as Defiance. The Barlow post office was renamed Glenwood Springs on March 28, 1884.)	Garfield	81601-81602	Mar 28, 1884	open
Globeville (Note: On December 1, 1902, the newly created City and County of Denver annexed the towns of Argo, Berkeley, Elyria, Globeville, Montclair, and Valverde.)	Denver	80216	Mar 04, 1890	Jun 16, 1900
Glory (Note: The Beecher, Colorado, post office closed on November 3, 1905, but reopened as Glory on November 13, 1924, and was then renamed Beecher Island on February 1, 1925.)	Yuma		Nov 13, 1924	Feb 01, 1925
Godfrey (Note: The Godfrey, Colorado, post office was renamed Buick on April 11, 1916, and was then renamed Beuck on March 23, 1918.)	Elbert		Jan 29, 1908	Apr 11, 1916
Goff	Kit Carson		Apr 23, 1888	Jun 15, 1910
Golconda	Montezuma		Apr 26, 1894	Jul 01, 1895
Gold Dirt	Gilpin		Aug 13, 1861	Oct 11, 1867
Gold Hill (Note: The spelling of the Gold Hill, Colorado, post office was changed to Goldhill on June 4, 1894, however the community continues to use the name Gold Hill.)	Boulder	80302	Jan 13, 1863	Apr 17, 1866
Gold Hill	Boulder	80302	Dec 26, 1879	Jun 04, 1894
Gold Park	Eagle		Mar 31, 1881	Oct 05, 1883
Golddale	Douglas		Jun 29, 1882	Feb 12, 1885
Golden (Note: On April 6, 1860, the Golden City, Kansas Territory, post office opened, and on November 6 of that year, the Provisional Government of the Territory of Jefferson designated Golden City as the new seat of Jefferson County, Jefferson Territory, and seven days later, it designated Golden City as its new territorial capital. On November 1, 1861, the new Territory of Colorado created 17 original counties, with Golden City as the seat of Jefferson County, Colorado Territory. Golden City served as the third capital of the Territory of Colorado from August 14, 1862, until December 9, 1867. The City of Golden City, Colorado Territory, was incorporated on January 2, 1871. On June 27, 1876, Golden City shortened its name to Golden, and since statehood on August 1 of that year, Golden has been the seat of Jefferson County, Colorado.)	Jefferson	80401-80403; 80419, 80439	Jun 27, 1876	open
Golden City	Jefferson	80401	Apr 06, 1860	Jun 27, 1876
Golden Gate	Jefferson	80403	Sep 06, 1860	Aug 19, 1863
Goldfield	Teller	80860	May 05, 1895	Jun 03, 1932
Goldhill	Boulder	80302	Jan 13, 1863	Apr 17, 1866
Goldhill	Boulder	80302	Dec 26, 1879	Jun 04, 1894
Goldrock	El Paso		Apr 14, 1896	Aug 31, 1896
Gomers Mil	Elbert		Jun 13, 1870	Mar 15, 1876
Gomers Mil	Elbert		Aug 22, 1876	Jun 27, 1882
Goodpasture	Pueblo	81023	May 25, 1895	May 31, 1923
Goodrich	Morgan	80653	Dec 14, 1908	Aug 30, 1974
Gordon	Huerfano		Jul 01, 1924	Dec 15, 1937
Gorham (Note: The Marshall, Colorado, post office opened on August 2, 1878, and closed on October 5, 1880, but reopened as Langford on August 5, 1881, but was then changed back Marshall on May 19, 1892. The Marshall Post Office closed again on April 10, 1893, but reopened as Langford again on May 1, 1895, only to be renamed Gorham on August 1, 1899. The Gorham post office finally closed on January 15, 1942. The community continues to be known as Marshall.)	Boulder	80305	Aug 31, 1899	Jan 31, 1901
Gorham	Boulder	80305	Aug 05, 1901	Jan 15, 1942
Gotera (Note: The second Duncan, Colorado, post office was renamed Gotera on August 17, 1916, and was then renamed Lone Oak on January 23, 1922.)	Las Animas		Aug 17, 1916	Jan 23, 1922
Gothic	Gunnison		Aug 05, 1879	Jun 22, 1896
Gothic	Gunnison		Jun 20, 1907	Jan 31, 1914
Gould (Note: The Peneold, Colorado, post office was renamed Gould on June 1, 1937.)	Jackson	80480	Jun 01, 1937	Mar 14, 1973
Gove (Note: The first Dora, Colorado, post office was renamed Gove on October 31, 1883.)	Custer		Dec 06, 1883	Oct 09, 1888
Gowanda	Weld	80651	Aug 03, 1915	Nov 15, 1930
Graceland	Elbert		Apr 20, 1908	Sep 30, 1911
Gradens	Montezuma		Jul 07, 1896	Nov 30, 1903
Graft	Baca		Aug 12, 1916	Dec 31, 1934
Graham	Weld		Apr 01, 1911	Feb 28, 1918
Granada	Prowers	81041	Jul 10, 1873	open
Granby	Grand	80446	Oct 26, 1905	open
Grand Junction (Note: The Ute, Colorado, post office was renamed Grand Junction on May 26, 1882.)	Mesa	81501-81507	May 26, 1882	open
Grand Lake (Note: The spelling of the Grand Lake, Colorado, post office was changed to Grandlake on January 30, 1895, but was then changed back to Grand Lake on April 1, 1938.)	Grand	80447	Jan 10, 1879	Jan 30, 1895
Grand Lake	Grand	80447	Apr 01, 1938	open
Grand Mesa	Delta	81413	Jun 23, 1927	Aug 31, 1958
Grand Valley (Note: The Town of Parachute, Colorado, was originally incorporated on April 1, 1908, as the Town of Grand Valley. The Grand Valley post office was renamed Parachute on July 4, 1980.)	Garfield	81635	Aug 19, 1904	Jul 04, 1980
Grandlake	Grand	80447	Jan 30, 1895	Apr 01, 1938
Graneros	Pueblo		Aug 17, 1889	Apr 15, 1925
Granger	El Paso		Jan 12, 1883	Dec 13, 1888
Granger	Rio Grande		Oct 14, 1902	Jan 12, 1903
Granite	Chaffee	81228	Nov 30, 1868	Mar 25, 1966
Granite Vale	Park		Dec 19, 1861	Jan 31, 1870
Grant (Note: The Grant, Colorado, post office closed on October 13, 1918, but reopened as Olava on August 27, 1936, and was then renamed Grant on January 1, 1948.)	Park	80448	May 16, 1871	Oct 13, 1918
Grant	Park	80448	Jan 14, 1925	rescinded
Grant	Park	80448	Jan 01, 1948	Feb 06, 1993
Grape	Fremont		Jun 04, 1883	Jan 13, 1887
Grassy Hill	San Juan		Jan 30, 1879	Jul 15, 1880
Gray	Washington		Apr 23, 1888	Jul 16, 1889
Graycreek (Note: The Chapel, Colorado, post office was renamed Graycreek on January 3, 1895.)	Las Animas		Jan 03, 1895	Aug 31, 1921
Graylin	Logan		Sep 26, 1910	Dec 15, 1917
Graymont	Clear Creek	80476	May 19, 1884	Oct 16, 1884
Grays Ranch	Huerfano		Sep 01, 1863	Feb 06, 1866
Great Divide	Moffat		Jan 30, 1917	Jul 31, 1954
Greeley	Weld	80631-80639	Apr 21, 1870	open
Green (Note: The name of the Green Mountain Falls, Colorado, post office was shortened to Green on September 28, 1894, but was then changed back to Green Mountain Falls on June 25, 1901.)	El Paso; Teller	80819	Sep 28, 1894	Jun 25, 1901
Green	Saguache		Mar 18, 1884	Sep 30, 1884
Green Cañon	Las Animas		Feb 04, 1909	Aug 11, 1910
Green City	Weld		Jun 15, 1871	Apr 14, 1874
Green Knoll	Lincoln		Mar 31, 1917	Jul 31, 1933
Green Mountain Falls	El Paso; Teller	80819	Aug 28, 1888	Sep 28, 1894
Green Mountain Falls	El Paso; Teller	80819	Jun 25, 1901	open
Greenhorn	Pueblo	81069	Dec 10, 1866	Jun 05, 1896
Greenhorn	Pueblo	81069	Oct 16, 1897	Dec 15, 1911
Greenwood	Custer	81253	Feb 16, 1872	Jun 29, 1918
Greenwood Village	Arapahoe	80110-80112; 80121, 80155		
Gresham	Boulder		Jul 17, 1895	Nov 30, 1912
Gresham	Garfield		Jun 20, 1883	Dec 01, 1884
Greystone	Moffat	81640	Jun 20, 1921	Dec 05, 1975
Griffth (Note: The Griffth, Colorado, post office was renamed Falfa on November 19, 1924.)	La Plata	81303	Dec 02, 1909	Nov 19, 1924
Grimaldi	Pueblo		Aug 22, 1913	Nov 30, 1920
Grinnell (Note: The San Jose, Colorado, post office was renamed Grinnell on December 18, 1878.)	Las Animas		Dec 18, 1878	Jul 10, 1883
Grommet (Note: The Grommet, Colorado, post office was renamed Oxford on January 13, 1908.)	La Plata	81137	May 03, 1904	Jan 13, 1908
Grotto	Jefferson		Mar 07, 1881	Mar 21, 1882
Grousemont (Note: On February 4, 1918, during the Great War, the Kaiserhiem, Colorado, post office was renamed Grousemont.)	Park		Feb 04, 1918	Jan 15, 1919
Grover	Weld	80729	Mar 03, 1885	open
Guffey (Note: The Idaville, Colorado, post office was renamed Guffey on May 23, 1896.)	Park	80820	May 23, 1896	open
Gulch	Boulder		Jun 20, 1892	Jan 07, 1893
Gulch (Note: The name of the Spring Gulch, Colorado, post office was shortened to Gulch on April 19, 1895.)	Pitkin		Apr 19, 1895	Dec 15, 1916
Gulnare	Las Animas	81042	Dec 16, 1890	open
Gunnison	Gunnison	81230-81231	Oct 02, 1876	open
Gurney	Yuma		Sep 17, 1907	Sep 15, 1923
Guston	Ouray		Jan 26, 1892	Nov 16, 1898
Gwillimsville	El Paso		Apr 18, 1878	Aug 27, 1886
Gwillimsville	El Paso		Apr 29, 1887	Sep 25, 1890
Gypsum	Eagle	81637	Jun 14, 1883	open

== H ==
Select the OpenStreetMap link at the right to view the location of some of the post offices in this section.

Post office	Current county	ZIP Code	Date opened	Date closed
Hahns Peak	Routt		May 03, 1877	Nov 26, 1941
Hale	Yuma	80735	May 17, 1890	Feb 16, 1894
Hale	Yuma	80735	Oct 30, 1900	Jun 01, 1984
Halfway	El Paso		Aug 21, 1903	May 31, 1917
Hall Valley (Note: The Hall Valley, Colorado, post office was renamed Hallvale on November 5, 1894.)	Park		Aug 10, 1874	Nov 27, 1876
Hall Valley	Park		Dec 27, 1876	Nov 05, 1894
Hallvale	Park		Nov 05, 1894	Mar 04, 1898
Hamilton	Moffat	81638	Jul 07, 1896	Aug 15, 1917
Hamilton	Moffat	81638	Sep 02, 1910	open
Hamilton	Park		Jul 26, 1860	Nov 10, 1881
Hammond	Park		Apr 10, 1896	May 15, 1903
Hancock	Chaffee		Sep 10, 1880	Jun 24, 1887
Hancock	Chaffee		Nov 14, 1903	Dec 31, 1904
Hanover	Kit Carson		Jul 07, 1908	Oct 29, 1908
Hanover	San Miguel		Jun 10, 1913	Apr 30, 1921
Happyville (Note: The Happyville, Colorado, post office moved to Heartstrong on February 28, 1922.)	Yuma	80727	Jul 26, 1910	Feb 28, 1922
Harbourdale	Bent		Sep 20, 1915	Jun 15, 1925
Hardin (Note: The Platte Valley, Colorado, post office was renamed Hardin on November 2, 1881.)	Weld	80644	Nov 02, 1881	Apr 07, 1894
Hardin	Weld	80644	Dec 06, 1894	Feb 15, 1955
Hardscrabble	Routt		Feb 12, 1925	Nov 15, 1925
Hargisville	Elbert		May 20, 1908	Nov 15, 1915
Harlow	Mesa		May 17, 1890	Apr 07, 1891
Harman (Note: The City of Denver annexed the Town of Harman on February 20, 1895.)	Denver		Aug 16, 1887	Jan 15, 1904
Harris (Note: The Harris, Colorado, post office was renamed Westminster on June 5, 1908.)	Adams	80030	Apr 21, 1890	Jun 05, 1908
Harrisburg (Note: The Harrisburg, Colorado, post office was renamed Lindon on September 21, 1888.)	Washington	80740	Feb 19, 1887	Sep 21, 1888
Harrison	Routt		Mar 27, 1901	Jan 15, 1908
Hartman	Prowers	81043	Mar 02, 1908	open
Hartsel	Park	80449	Mar 16, 1875	open
Haskill	San Miguel		Feb 10, 1888	Feb 28, 1907
Hastings	Las Animas		Sep 12, 1889	Feb 15, 1939
Hasty	Bent	81044	Dec 07, 1910	open
Haswell	Kiowa	81045	Mar 31, 1903	open
Hatton	Fremont		Jun 12, 1882	Aug 10, 1887
Hauman (Note: The Hauman, Colorado, post office closed on August 25, 1885, but reopened as Orient on October 15, 1894.)	Saguache		Jan 08, 1882	Aug 25, 1885
Haverly	Gunnison		Aug 30, 1880	Nov 22, 1880
Haworth	Jackson		Aug 26, 1884	Mar 17, 1898
Haworth	Jackson		Jun 17, 1905	May 31, 1906
Hawthorne (Note: The Hawthorne, Colorado, post office was renamed Eldorado Springs on May 1, 1930.)	Boulder	80025	Sep 12, 1906	May 01, 1930
Hawxhurst	Mesa		Aug 25, 1882	Mar 03, 1892
Haxtum (Note: The Haxtum, Colorado, post office was renamed Haxtun on January 17, 1922.)	Phillips	80731	Apr 25, 1888	Jan 17, 1922
Haxtun	Phillips	80731	Jan 17, 1922	open
Haybro (Note: The Junction City, Colorado, post office closed on December 12, 1916, but reopened as Haybro on March 15, 1918.)	Routt		Mar 15, 1918	Jul 15, 1951
Hayden (Note: Hayden, Colorado, served as the original seat of Routt County from January 29, 1877, until 1878.)	Routt	81639	Nov 15, 1875	Sep 30, 1880
Hayden	Routt	81639	Nov 22, 1880	Aug 01, 1881
Hayden	Routt	81639	Oct 24, 1881	open
Hayden Creek (Note: The Hayden Creek, Colorado, post office was renamed Palmer on February 10, 1880, then renamed Hendricks on January 31, 1887, then renamed Coaldale on February 16, 1891.)	Fremont	81222	May 04, 1878	Feb 10, 1880
Hayman	Park	80827	Aug 13, 1904	Aug 10, 1918
Haynes Ranch	Pueblo		Jul 31, 1861	Mar 03, 1863
Haywood	Summit		Aug 14, 1879	Oct 02, 1882
Hazeltine (Note: The Washburn, Colorado, post office was renamed Derblay on July 13, 1892, but the name was changed back to Washburn on December 22 of that year, only to be renamed Hazeltine on January 7, 1893.)	Adams	80601	Jan 07, 1893	Jan 15, 1907
Heartstrong	Yuma	80727	May 31, 1921	Jan 31, 1940
Heathton	Fremont		Dec 28, 1906	May 15, 1908
Hebron	Jackson		Jul 11, 1884	Feb 15, 1922
Hecla	Garfield		Apr 29, 1891	Jun 11, 1895
Heeney	Summit	80498	Jun 20, 1939	Oct 31, 1959
Heeney	Summit	80498	May 15, 1960	Apr 26, 1974
Heiberger	Mesa	81624	Oct 30, 1908	Feb 14, 1925
Helena	Chaffee		Oct 16, 1866	Mar 10, 1880
Henderson (Note: The Island Station, Colorado, post office was renamed Henderson on March 1, 1894.)	Adams	80640	Mar 01, 1894	open
Henderson (Note: The Henderson, Colorado, post office in Sedgwick County was renamed Sedgwick on September 10, 1885.)	Sedgwick	80749	May 07, 1883	Sep 10, 1885
Hendricks	Fremont	81222	Jan 31, 1887	Feb 16, 1891
Henry	Alamosa	81101	Nov 29, 1889	May 11, 1892
Henry	Alamosa	81101	Jun 11, 1895	Feb 21, 1896
Henry	Lake		Jun 03, 1880	Jan 20, 1882
Henry (Note: The Lariat, Colorado, post office was renamed Henry on April 16, 1884, and was then renamed Monte Vista on February 18, 1886.)	Rio Grande	81144	Apr 16, 1884	Feb 18, 1886
Henry	Washington		Dec 26, 1907	Nov 15, 1917
Henson	Hinsdale		May 17, 1883	Apr 22, 1884
Henson	Hinsdale		Nov 12, 1892	Nov 30, 1913
Herad	Saguache		Nov 13, 1905	Dec 15, 1912
Hereford	Weld	80732	Dec 21, 1888	Jun 30, 1894
Hereford	Weld	80732	May 08, 1909	open
Heritage	Arapahoe		Jan 01, 1976	Sep 23, 1978
Hermes	Yuma		Sep 11, 1908	Nov 15, 1919
Hermit	Hinsdale		Jul 06, 1904	Sep 15, 1920
Hermitage	Dolores		Oct 17, 1904	Jun 29, 1907
Hermitage	Grand		May 17, 1878	Dec 18, 1878
Hermitage	Grand		Apr 22, 1879	Jan 10, 1884
Hermosa	La Plata	81301	Jul 27, 1876	Dec 21, 1895
Hermosa	La Plata	81301	Mar 10, 1896	Nov 10, 1896
Hermosa	La Plata	81301	Dec 23, 1896	Sep 29, 1900
Hermosilla	Pueblo		Mar 21, 1867	Jan 25, 1870
Hermosilla	Pueblo		May 16, 1870	Jan 15, 1872
Herndon	Jefferson		Feb 25, 1884	Aug 01, 1884
Hesperus (Note: The Fort Lewis, Colorado, post office moved to Hesperus on October 10, 1891.)	La Plata	81326	Oct 10, 1891	open
Hessie	Boulder		Mar 19, 1898	Jun 30, 1902
Hester	Crowley		Jun 16, 1905	Nov 30, 1912
Hewit	La Plata		Jul 14, 1882	Jan 05, 1883
Hewit	La Plata		Jun 25, 1883	Jul 09, 1885
Heywood (Note: The Hortense, Colorado, post office was renamed Heywood on June 20, 1884. The Heywood Post Office closed on February 15, 1888, but reopened as the Hortense post office on May 24, 1901.)	Chaffee		Jun 20, 1884	Feb 15, 1888
Hezron	Huerfano		Jan 20, 1902	Feb 14, 1912
Hibbard (Note: The Hibbard, Colorado, post office was renamed Drennan in 1922.)	El Paso		1920	1922
Hickman	Custer		Dec 10, 1866	May 29, 1867
Hickman	Custer		Jul 17, 1867	Sep 20, 1869
Hicks	Las Animas		Apr 04, 1895	Feb 15, 1918
Hideaway Park (Note: The West Portal, Colorado, post office closed on December 1, 1939, but reopened as Hideaway Park on August 4, 1949.)	Grand	80482	Aug 04, 1949	Oct 31, 1980
Higbee	Otero	81050	Apr 25, 1872	Feb 28, 1925
Higgins (Note: The first Divide, Colorado, post office closed on August 19, 1885, but reopened as Dolomite on October 11, 1886. The Dolomite post office was renamed Higgins on April 27, 1890, and then renamed Newett on April 22, 1895.)	Chaffee		Aug 27, 1890	Nov 21, 1892
Higgins	Chaffee		Mar 03, 1893	Apr 22, 1895
Higgins	Las Animas		Dec 26, 1911	Jun 15, 1914
Highland Lake (Note: The spelling of the Highlandlake, Colorado, post office was changed to Highland Lake on January 29, 1910.)	Weld	80542	Jan 29, 1910	Aug 09, 1913
Highland Mary	San Juan		Mar 26, 1878	Jun 29, 1885
Highlandlake	Weld	80542	Nov 08, 1883	Jan 29, 1910
Highlands (Note: The Highlandtown, Colorado, post office was renamed Highlands on October 15, 1884.) (Note: The City of Denver annexed the Town of Highlands on July 24, 1896.)	Denver	80211	Oct 15, 1884	Nov 13, 1897
Highlandtown	Denver	80211	Jun 29, 1883	Oct 15, 1884
Highmore	Garfield		Mar 21, 1889	Oct 15, 1931
Higho	Jackson		Jun 14, 1889	Jan 31, 1900
Higho	Jackson		Apr 14, 1900	Aug 15, 1930
Highpark	Teller		Jun 02, 1896	Jun 03, 1899
Highpark	Teller		Jan 17, 1902	Apr 30, 1913
Highpark	Teller		Sep 03, 1914	May 31, 1917
Hill Top (Note: The spelling of the Hill Top, Colorado, post office was changed to Hilltop in 1896.)	Douglas	80134	Feb 17, 1890	1896
Hillerton (Note: On November 20, 1882, the Hillerton, Colorado, post office was moved to Abbeyville.)	Gunnison		May 26, 1879	Nov 20, 1882
Hillrose	Morgan	80733	Nov 26, 1900	open
Hillsboro (Note: The spelling of the Hillsborough, Colorado, post office was changed to Hillsboro on April 12, 1891,)	Weld	80543	Apr 12, 1891	Jun 29, 1894
Hillsboro	Weld	80543	Feb 14, 1896	Nov 14, 1903
Hillsborough	Weld	80543	Jun 15, 1871	Apr 12, 1891
Hillsdale	Fremont		Feb 18, 1880	Aug 02, 1880
Hillside (Note: The original Texas Creek, Colorado, post office closed on March 31, 1882, but reopened as Texas on May 12, 1882, and was then renamed Hillside on January 21, 1884. The Ford post office was renamed Texas Creek on September 10, 1885.)	Fremont	81232	Jan 24, 1884	Dec 04, 1964
Hilltop	Douglas	80134	1896	Dec 31, 1943
Hiltonville	Weld		Oct 10, 1873	Sep 24, 1875
Hirst	Alamosa		Jun 19, 1899	Jul 31, 1901
Hobart	Teller		Feb 06, 1900	Feb 15, 1902
Hoehne	Las Animas	81046	Nov 02, 1886	open
Hogg	Montezuma	81323	Mar 12, 1903	Mar 15, 1906
Holbrook	Otero		Jun 06, 1906	Feb 27, 1907
Holden	Pueblo		Jan 15, 1892	Jun 13, 1893
Holland	Park		Feb 24, 1874	Dec 23, 1874
Holly	Prowers	81047	Nov 26, 1880	open
Holtwold	Elbert		Jan 16, 1889	Apr 15, 1902
Holtwold	Elbert		Apr 22, 1910	Feb 28, 1917
Holy Cross (Note: Located at an elevation of 11,428 feet (3,483 m), the Holy Cross, Colorado, post office was the highest elevation U.S. post office from November 10, 1883, to September 16, 1889.) (Note: Since their GNIS elevations only differ by 3 feet (0.9 m), both Rexford, Colorado, and Holy Cross, Colorado, had legitimate claims to the highest elevation U.S. post office from January 23, 1882, to November 10, 1883.)	Eagle		Jan 23, 1882	Feb 08, 1899
Holy Cross	Eagle		Dec 07, 1904	Aug 07, 1905
Holyoke	Phillips	80734	Nov 09, 1887	open
Home	Larimer		Feb 07, 1882	Mar 31, 1946
Homelake	Rio Grande	81135	Feb 11, 1919	Dec 03, 1965
Honnold	Larimer		Apr 26, 1890	Apr 30, 1904
Hooper	Alamosa	81136	Jul 17, 1896	open
Hoopup	Las Animas		Feb 26, 1919	Jul 31, 1920
Hoopup	Las Animas		Sep 27, 1920	Dec 15, 1937
Hope (Note: The Hope, Colorado, post office in Lake County was renamed Snowden on November 24, 1890.)	Lake		Nov 03, 1885	Nov 24, 1890
Hope	Mesa		Apr 22, 1896	Mar 03, 1900
Horace	El Paso		Jun 05, 1896	Mar 08, 1899
Horse Shoe (Note: The Horse Shoe, Colorado, post office closed on July 8, 1886, but reopened as Horseshoe on April 4, 1890. The Horseshoe Post Office closed on July 2, 1894, but reopened as Doran on November 1, 1901.)	Park		Aug 23, 1880	Jul 08, 1886
Horsefly	Montrose		May 01, 1886	Feb 18, 1888
Horsefly	Montrose		Jun 01, 1912	Dec 31, 1915
Horseshoe	Park		Apr 04, 1890	Jul 02, 1894
Hortense	Chaffee		May 11, 1877	Jun 20, 1884
Hortense	Chaffee		May 24, 1901	Sep 14, 1907
Hot Springs	Ouray		May 04, 1877	Aug 28, 1879
Hot Sulphur Springs (Note: The name of the Hot Sulphur Springs, Colorado, post office was shortened to Sulphur Springs on June 26, 1894, but was then changed back to Hot Sulphur Springs on February 15, 1912.)	Grand	80451	Sep 10, 1874	Jun 26, 1894
Hot Sulphur Springs	Grand	80451	Feb 15, 1912	open
Hotchkiss	Delta	81419	Oct 03, 1882	open
Houck	Huerfano		Feb 13, 1883	May 31, 1883
Howard (Note: The Pleasant Valley, Colorado, post office was renamed Howard on July 26, 1882.)	Fremont	81233	Jul 26, 1882	open
Howardsville (Note: Howardsville served as the original seat of La Plata County, Colorado Territory, from February 10, 1874, until January 31, 1876.)	San Juan		Jun 24, 1874	Sep 30, 1922
Howardsville	San Juan		Jan 18, 1923	Oct 31, 1939
Howbert	Park		Dec 22, 1887	Jun 30, 1933
Howeville (Note: The Howeville, Colorado, post office closed on May 14, 1904, but reopened as Jack's Cabin on January 25, 1909.)	Gunnison		Jun 26, 1879	May 11, 1880
Howeville	Gunnison		Dec 28, 1900	May 14, 1904
Howland	Lake		Aug 08, 1879	Sep 19, 1882
Hoyt	Kit Carson		Mar 27, 1888	Nov 10, 1888
Hoyt	Morgan	80654	Jun 09, 1906	open
Hudson	Weld	80642	Mar 27, 1883	open
Huerfano (1862)	Huerfano		Feb 25, 1862	Jan 20, 1879
Huerfano (Note: The Ute, Colorado, post office was renamed Huerfano on April 27, 1900.)	Huerfano		Apr 27, 1900	Apr 15, 1929
Huerfano	Pueblo		Nov 10, 1882	Feb 05, 1883
Huerfano	Pueblo		May 09, 1883	Feb 15, 1884
Huerfano Cañon	Huerfano	81040	Apr 05, 1878	Jul 21, 1887
Huerfano Cañon	Huerfano	81040	Jan 18, 1888	Oct 16, 1890
Huerfano Canyon	Huerfano	81040	Apr 13, 1871	Oct 03, 1871
Huerfano Canyon	Huerfano	81040	Dec 01, 1871	Dec 15, 1871
Huggins (Note: The second Conger, Colorado, post office was renamed Pallas on July 15, 1895, and was then renamed Huggins on March 23, 1906. The Huggins Post Office closed on September 15, 1908, but reopened as Pallas on August 21, 1912.)	Routt		Mar 23, 1906	Sep 15, 1908
Hughes (Note: The Hughes, Colorado, post office was renamed Brighton on August 4, 1879.)	Adams	80601	Apr 13, 1871	Aug 04, 1879
Hughes	Yuma		Apr 11, 1913	Oct 31, 1954
Hugo	Lincoln	80821	Dec 01, 1871	open
Hukill	Clear Creek		May 12, 1879	May 10, 1880
Humbar	Las Animas		Aug 06, 1887	Oct 27, 1887
Hummel	Las Animas		Oct 03, 1882	Jan 26, 1883
Huntsville (Note: The Huntsville, Colorado, post office was renamed Larkspur on December 13, 1871.)	Douglas	80118	Mar 24, 1860	Jul 09, 1861
Huntsville	Douglas	80118	Jan 22, 1862	Aug 29, 1867
Huntsville	Douglas	80118	Apr 08, 1869	Dec 13, 1871
Husted	El Paso		Oct 01, 1878	Nov 07, 1895
Husted	El Paso		Jul 30, 1896	Oct 15, 1920
Hutchinson (Note: The Hutchinson, Colorado, post office was renamed Conifer on November 16, 1894.)	Jefferson	80433	Apr 27, 1865	Sep 25, 1869
Hutchinson	Jefferson	80433	Feb 19, 1872	Jan 03, 1881
Hutchinson	Jefferson	80433	Jun 15, 1881	Nov 16, 1894
Hyde	Montrose	80743	Aug 01, 1882	Nov 21, 1883
Hyde	Montrose	80743	May 28, 1884	Apr 16, 1898
Hyde	Montrose	80743	Nov 21, 1907	May 15, 1909
Hyde	Montrose	80743	Aug 18, 1911	Oct 15, 1908
Hyde	Montrose	80743	Aug 02, 1920	Feb 15, 1940
Hydrate	Routt		Jun 17, 1920	Sep 15, 1937
Hydraulic	Montrose		Jul 25, 1888	May 24, 1893
Hydraulic	Montrose		Oct 01, 1901	May 31, 1905
Hygiene	Boulder	80533	Jun 25, 1883	open
Hynes	La Plata		May 19, 1884	Feb 04, 1885

== I ==
Select the OpenStreetMap link at the right to view the location of some of the post offices in this section.

Post office	Current county	ZIP Code	Date opened	Date closed
Ibex	Lake		Mar 07, 1896	Aug 31, 1896
Ibex	Lake		Mar 08, 1898	Apr 15, 1905
Idaho (Note: Idaho served as the original seat of Clear Creek County, Colorado Territory, from November 1, 1861, until 1867. The Idaho, Colorado Territory, post office was renamed Idaho Springs on April 7, 1876.)	Clear Creek	80452	Mar 22, 1862	Apr 07, 1876
Idaho Springs	Clear Creek	80452	Apr 07, 1876	open
Idalia	Yuma	80735	Sep 18, 1888	open
Idaville	Park	80820	Apr 12, 1895	May 23, 1896
Ideal	Huerfano		Feb 24, 1910	Nov 07, 1929
Idledale (Note: The Joylan, Colorado, post office was renamed Starbuck on July 7, 1920, and was then renamed Idledale on September 1, 1930.)	Jefferson	80453	Sep 01, 1930	open
Ignacio (Note: Ignacio, Colorado, is the headquarters of the Southern Ute Indian Tribe.)	La Plata	81137	Jan 31, 1882	open
Iliff	Logan	80736	Mar 21, 1882	Nov 27, 1895
Iliff	Logan	80736	Apr 23, 1896	open
Ilium	San Miguel	81435	Feb 10, 1891	Jul 20, 1894
Ilium	San Miguel	81435	Aug 01, 1910	Nov 30, 1917
Ilse	Custer		Aug 14, 1884	May 04, 1891
Ilse	Custer		Jan 23, 1895	Apr 30, 1919
Ilse	Custer		Dec 10, 1920	Sep 30, 1929
Inche	Arapahoe		Sep 14, 1891	Dec 10, 1891
Independence (Note: The Macon, Colorado, post office was renamed Independence on May 12, 1899.)	Teller		May 12, 1899	Jun 30, 1954
Indian Hills	Jefferson	80454	Jun 02, 1925	open
Indianapolis	Las Animas		Aug 11, 1887	May 16, 1889
Insmont	Park	80421	Jun 05, 1902	Dec 15, 1917
Interlaken	Lake		Apr 29, 1887	Jul 10, 1890
Interlaken	Lake		Mar 20, 1891	Apr 21, 1894
Iola	Gunnison		Jun 24, 1896	Aug 16, 1963
Ione	Weld	80621	Jun 16, 1927	Mar 21, 1958
Ionia (Note: The Copper, Colorado, post office was renamed Ionia on March 2, 1899.)	Mesa		Mar 02, 1899	Oct 01, 1899
Iris	Saguache		Oct 30, 1894	Apr 08, 1895
Iris	Saguache		May 07, 1895	Mar 15, 1902
Irondale	Adams	80022	Dec 11, 1889	Sep 19, 1895
Ironhill	Lake		Jun 18, 1883	Oct 30, 1883
Ironsides	Boulder		Apr 22, 1898	May 11, 1898
Ironton	Ouray		May 05, 1883	Apr 11, 1893
Ironton	Ouray		Jan 18, 1894	Aug 07, 1820
Irving	Douglas		Jun 24, 1913	Apr 15, 1920
Irwin	Gunnison		Sep 12, 1879	Apr 29, 1895
Irwin	Gunnison		Jul 16, 1895	Jun 05, 1900
Irwin Canyon	Las Animas		Mar 09, 1920	Sep 30, 1924
Island Station	Adams	80640	Aug 29, 1872	Mar 01, 1894
Ivanhoe	Pitkin		Apr 26, 1888	Jun 13, 1894
Ivanhoe	Pitkin		Jul 31, 1899	Jun 15, 1912
Ivanhoe	Pitkin		Aug 22, 1913	Aug 10, 1916
Ivywild	El Paso	80905	Sep 14, 1891	Jul 31, 1895

== J ==
Select the OpenStreetMap link at the right to view the location of some of the post offices in this section.

Post office	Current county	ZIP Code	Date opened	Date closed
Jack Rabbit	Moffat		Dec 20, 1916	May 31, 1923
Jack's Cabin	Gunnison		Jan 25, 1909	Mar 30, 1918
Jackson	Gunnison		NA	Feb 20, 1893
Jackson	Pueblo		Mar 21, 1873	1887
Jamestown	Boulder	80455	Jan 08, 1867	Jul 15, 1930
Jamestown	Boulder	80455	Jun 19, 1934	open
Janeway	Pitkin		Aug 16, 1887	Nov 30, 1900
Jansen	Las Animas	81082	Jun 23, 1902	May 31, 1911
Jansen	Las Animas	81082	Sep 02, 1911	Jun 15, 1913
Jansen	Las Animas	81082	Mar 15, 1932	May 24, 1974
Jaroso	Costilla	81138	Mar 10, 1911	open
Jaroso	Las Animas		Dec 16, 1890	Nov 16, 1894
Jasper	Rio Grande	81132	Nov 20, 1882	Jul 30, 1910
Jasper	Rio Grande	81132	Jun 25, 1913	Feb 18, 1918
Jasper	Rio Grande	81132	May 11, 1920	Feb 15, 1927
Jefferson (Note: The Jefferson, Colorado Territory, post office was renamed Morrison on December 12, 1873, and was then renamed Mount Morrison on June 8, 1908, but was then changed back to Morrison on August 1, 1950.)	Jefferson	80465	Mar 25, 1872	Dec 12, 1873
Jefferson	Park	80456	Sep 03, 1861	Apr 04, 1863
Jefferson	Park	80456	Oct 03, 1879	open
Jennison (Note: The Jennison, Colorado, post office was renamed Timber Hill on April 25, 1879.)	San Juan		Jan 15, 1875	Dec 20, 1875
Jennison	San Juan		Apr 11, 1877	Dec 10, 1877
Jennison	San Juan		May 20, 1878	Apr 25, 1879
Jimmy Camp	El Paso		May 17, 1878	Jul 14, 1879
Joes	Yuma	80822	Oct 22, 1912	open
Johnstown	Weld; Larimer	80534	Apr 17, 1903	open
JoJunior	Montrose		Dec 16, 1914	rescinded
Jones (Note: The Jones, Colorado, post office was renamed Arlington on May 25, 1883.)	Mesa		Apr 03, 1883	May 25, 1883
Josie (Note: The Josie, Colorado, post office was renamed Naomi on January 4, 1883.)	Summit		Jul 21, 1882	Jan 04, 1883
Joya	Conejos		May 27, 1904	May 28, 1904
Joycoy	Baca		Aug 13, 1915	Mar 15, 1927
Joylan	Jefferson	80453	Jan 28, 1918	Jul 07, 1920
Jual	Dolores		Jan 28, 1918	Sep 14, 1918
Juanita	Archuleta		May 02, 1904	Jun 15, 1912
Julesburg (1860) (Note: The first Julesburg, Colorado Territory, post office moved to Clearwater on September 10, 1862.)	Sedgwick	80737	May 29, 1860	Sep 10, 1862
Julesburg (1864) (Note: The second Julesburg, Colorado, post office was renamed Denver Junction on January 7, 1885. The Denver Junction post office closed on May 26, 1886, but reopened as Weir on June 21, 1889.)	Sedgwick	80737	Jan 20, 1864	May 03, 1866
Julesburg (1864)	Sedgwick	80737	Aug 02, 1866	Aug 31, 1868
Julesburg (1864)	Sedgwick	80737	Apr 08, 1869	Nov 27, 1871
Julesburg (1864)	Sedgwick	80737	Dec 10, 1873	Apr 10, 1877
Julesburg (1864)	Sedgwick	80737	May 24, 1877	Jul 07, 1879
Julesburg (1864)	Sedgwick	80737	May 31, 1880	Feb 01, 1881
Julesburg (1864)	Sedgwick	80737	Mar 28, 1881	Jan 23, 1882
Julesburg (1864)	Sedgwick	80737	Apr 07, 1882	Jan 07, 1885
Julesburg	Sedgwick	80737	May 26, 1886	open
Junction	Jefferson		Aug 28, 1861	Oct 22, 1863
Junction City	Routt		May 13, 1912	Dec 12, 1916
Junction House	Morgan		Dec 14, 1864	Jul 16, 1866
Juniata	Pueblo		Jun 15, 1869	Aug 31, 1893
Juniper	Fremont		Jan 10, 1881	Oct 17, 1881
Juniper (Note: The Juniper, Colorado, post office was renamed Juniper Springs on September 4, 1919.)	Moffat		Feb 09, 1906	Sep 04, 1919
Juniper Springs	Moffat		Sep 04, 1919	Sep 30, 1946

== K ==
Select the OpenStreetMap link at the right to view the location of some of the post offices in this section.

Post office	Current county	ZIP Code	Date opened	Date closed
Kaiserhiem	Park		Apr 02, 1914	Feb 04, 1918
Kalbaugh	Fremont		Nov 02, 1898	Feb 15, 1900
Kalous	Weld		Apr 12, 1915	Apr 15, 1931
Kannah	Gunnison		Jun 29, 1882	Sep 11, 1882
Kant	Las Animas		Jul 20, 1921	Aug 15, 1925
Kanza	Elbert		Jul 19, 1907	Apr 14, 1917
Karval	Lincoln	80823	Mar 02, 1911	open
Katcina	Las Animas		Apr 10, 1907	Sep 12, 1907
Kauffman	Weld		Sep 12, 1914	Feb 28, 1934
Kazan	Las Animas		Feb 10, 1920	May 09, 1931
Kearns	Archuleta		Aug 15, 1913	May 15, 1919
Kearns	Archuleta		Sep 13, 1919	Oct 31, 1925
Keating	Custer		Dec 18, 1914	Nov 06, 1924
Keble	Pueblo		Apr 25, 1899	Jul 29, 1899
Keenesburg	Weld	80643	Apr 10, 1907	open
Kelim	Larimer	80534	Mar 02, 1915	Mar 15, 1923
Kelim	Larimer	80534	Apr 16, 1923	Oct 31, 1925
Kelker	El Paso	80910	Apr 30, 1912	Aug 31, 1914
Kelly	Logan		Aug 26, 1909	Nov 30, 1912
Kelly	Logan		May 26, 1913	Aug 15, 1916
Kendrick	Lincoln		Jan 25, 1906	Nov 30, 1956
Kenosha	Park		May 15, 1891	Oct 02, 1893
Kenwood (Note: The Radiant, Colorado, post office was renamed Pyrolite on April 20, 1915, and was then renamed Kenwood on April 16, 1926.)	Fremont		Apr 16, 1926	Dec 31, 1929
Keota	WeldCounty	80729	Sep 11, 1888	Jan 08, 1890
Keota	WeldCounty	80729	Jan 22, 1909	Dec 21, 1973
Kersey (Note: The Orr, Colorado, post office was renamed Kersey on December 20, 1894.)	Weld	80644	Dec 20, 1894	open
Kester	Park		Aug 10, 1874	Nov 11, 1886
Kester	Park		May 16, 1887	Dec 21, 1891
Keysor	Elbert		May 24, 1906	Feb 28, 1938
Keystone	Douglas		Apr 08, 1869	Oct 28, 1872
Keystone	Summit	80435		
Keystone Ranch (Note: The Keystone Ranch, Colorado Territory, post office closed on June 16, 1865, but reopened as Keystone on April 8, 1869.)	Douglas		Apr 07, 1963	Jun 16, 1865
Kezar	Gunnison		May 17, 1882	Jun 24, 1896
Kilburn	Kiowa		Jul 17, 1890	Oct 02, 1891
Kilburn	Larimer		Jun 04, 1895	Nov 02, 1898
Kilroy	Las Animas		Nov 15, 1917	rescinded
Kim	Las Animas	81049	Jan 30, 1917	open
Kimbrell	Saguache		Mar 11, 1881	Oct 14, 1881
King	Park		Apr 14, 1884	Oct 24, 1896
Kings Canyon	Jackson		Jun 13, 1928	Aug 31, 1936
Kinkel (Note: The Kinkel, Colorado, post office was renamed Burnt Mill on October 7, 1911.)	Pueblo	81023	Dec 19, 1907	Oct 07, 1911
Kinsey (Note: The Kremmling, Colorado, post office was renamed Kinsey on October 24, 1891, but was then changed back to Kremmling on June 19, 1895.)	Grand	80459	Oct 24, 1891	Jun 19, 1895
Kiowa	Elbert	80117	Feb 14, 1868	open
Kirk	Yuma	80824	Nov 18, 1887	open
Kirkwell	Baca		Jun 01, 1917	Dec 24, 1921
Kit Carson (Note: Kit Carson served as the seat of Greenwood County, Colorado Territory, for the four years it existed from February 11, 1870, until February 6, 1874.)	Cheyenne	80825	Dec 29, 1869	May 17, 1881
Kit Carson	Cheyenne	80825	Feb 14, 1882	open
Kittredge	Jefferson	80457	Apr 02, 1923	open
Kline (Note: The Kline, Colorado, post office moved to Marvel on March 31, 1953.)	La Plata	81326	Apr 22, 1904	Mar 31, 1953
Koenig	Weld		Jan 09, 1913	Aug 31, 1922
Koenig	Weld		May 19, 1923	Dec 31, 1930
Kokomo	Summit	80458	May 05, 1879	Oct 08, 1965
Konantz	Baca		Jan 04, 1895	Aug 15, 1918
Konantz	Baca		Apr 21, 1921	Apr 30, 1924
Kraft (Note: The Kraft, Colorado, post office was renamed Brown's Cañon on May 8, 1888. The Brown's Cañon post office closed on July 25, 1893, but reopened as the Brown Cañon post office on March 9, 1904.)	Chaffee		Feb 14, 1882	May 08, 1888
Krain	Chaffee		Mar 24, 1917	Jun 14, 1919
Kremmling	Grand	80459	Feb 12, 1885	Oct 24, 1891
Kremmling	Grand	80459	Jun 19, 1895	open
Kuhns Crossing	Elbert	80835	Apr 10, 1879	Jan 31, 1920
Kukkuk	Kit Carson		Apr 24, 1907	Apr 15, 1908
Kuner	Weld	80644	Jul 22, 1908	Sep 30, 1920
Kutch	Elbert	80832	Jul 17, 1899	Oct 09, 1899
Kutch	Elbert	80832	Jun 03, 1905	Jan 31, 1971

== L ==
Select the OpenStreetMap link at the right to view the location of some of the post offices in this section.

Post office	Current county	ZIP Code	Date opened	Date closed
La Boca (Note: The Laboca, Colorado, post office closed on March 16, 1896, but reopened as La Boca on February 23, 1909.)	La Plata	81137	Feb 23, 1909	Sep 12, 1937
La Garita	Saguache	81132	Jun 24, 1874	May 18, 1875
La Garita	Saguache	81132	Nov 13, 1886	Dec 07, 1894
La Garita	Saguache	81132	Apr 07, 1897	Nov 11, 1972
La Jara	Conejos	81140	Jul 15, 1884	open
La Junta	Otero	81050	Jan 26, 1876	Jul 27, 1877
La Junta	Otero	81050	Sep 20, 1878	open
La Plata (Note: The La Plata, Colorado, post office closed on December 23, 1885, but reopened as Laplata on April)	La Plata	81326	Jul 24, 1882	Dec 23, 1885
La Porte (Note: The Auroria, Nebraska Territory, post office moved to Colona on April 27, 1860. The Colona Post Office closed on February 11, 1861, but reopened on July 15, 1862, as La Porte. The La Porte post office closed on December 12, 1864, but reopened on October 5, 1866. La Porte served as the seat of Heele County, Jefferson Territory, from November 28, 1859, until June 6, 1861, and then served as the original seat of Larimer County, Colorado Territory, from November 1, 1861, until 1868. The name of the La Porte post office was changed to Laporte on December 21, 1894.)	Larimer	80535	Jul 15, 1862	Dec 12, 1864
La Porte	Larimer	80535	Oct 05, 1866	Dec 21, 1894
La Salle (Note: The Town of La Salle, Colorado, changed the spelling of its name to LaSalle, but it is still served by the La Salle, Colorado, post office.)	Weld	80645	May 06, 1886	open
La Sauses (Note: The Los Sauses, Colorado, post office closed on February 15, 1883, but reopened as La Sauses on June 25, 1890, and was then respelled Lasauses on February 28, 1895. The community still uses its original name Los Sauses.)	Conejos	81151	Jun 25, 1890	Feb 28, 1895
La Veta (Note: The Spanish Peak, Colorado, post office was renamed La Veta on August 17, 1876.)	Huerfano	81055	Aug 17, 1876	open
Laboca	La Plata	81137	Mar 02, 1895	Mar 16, 1896
Lado	Conejos		Feb 25, 1884	Mar 09, 1885
Ladore (Note: The Ladore, Colorado, post office was renamed Lodore on March 25, 1924.)	Moffat		Jun 03, 1889	Mar 25, 1924
Lafayette	Boulder	80026	Feb 04, 1889	open
Lajara	Conejos	81140	Mar 05, 1875	May 15, 1884
Laird (Note: The Laird, Colorado, post office was renamed Seebarsee on February 17, 1892, but reverted to Laird on January 25, 1899.)	Yuma	80758	Jul 12, 1887	Feb 17, 1892
Laird	Yuma	80758	Jan 25, 1899	NA
Lake City	Hinsdale	81235	Jun 18, 1875	open
Lake George	Park	80827	May 15, 1891	Sep 30, 1905
Lake George	Park	80827	Sep 27, 1910	open
Lake Station	Lincoln	80828	Jul 27, 1870	Oct 12, 1871
Lakeshore	Hinsdale		Oct 19, 1896	May 14, 1904
Lakeside	Jefferson	80212		
Lakeside (Note: The Lakeside, Colorado, post office in Summit County closed on September 20, 1886, but reopened as Plain on January 21, 1898.)	Summit		Sep 14, 1882	Sep 20, 1886
Laketon	Elbert		Oct 09, 1884	Mar 27, 1886
Lakeview	Jefferson	80033	Dec 03, 1892	Feb 03, 1894
Lakevista	Montezuma		Jul 27, 1914	Feb 15, 1918
Lakewood	Boulder		Oct 01, 1912	Dec 31, 1920
Lakewood	Jefferson	80226; 80214-80215; 80225; 80227-80228; 80232; 80235-80236; 80123, 80401	Apr 21, 1892	Sep 15, 1900
Lakewood	Jefferson	80226; 80214-80215; 80225; 80227-80228; 80232; 80235-80236; 80123, 80401	Jun 07, 1937	Mar 31, 1942
Lakewood	Jefferson	80226; 80214-80215; 80225; 80227-80228; 80232; 80235-80236; 80123, 80401	NA	open
Lamar	Prowers	81052	Jul 16, 1886	open
Lamar	Pueblo		Aug 12, 1885	Jul 09, 1886
Lamartine	Clear Creek	80452	Nov 27, 1889	1909
Lamb	Jefferson		Jun 11, 1890	Dec 15, 1908
Lamport	Baca		Jun 08, 1908	May 31, 1927
Lanark	Saguache		Mar 29, 1898	Dec 27, 1898
Landsman	Kit Carson; Yuma		Mar 27, 1883	May 31, 1918
Langdon (Note: The Langdon, Colorado, post office was renamed Crystola on November 24, 1911.)	Teller	80819	Dec 21, 1907	Nov 24, 1911
Langford	Boulder	80305	Aug 05, 1881	May 19, 1892
Langford	Boulder	80305	May 01, 1895	Aug 31, 1899
Lansing	Yuma		Sep 17, 1886	Feb 28, 1910
Laplata	La Plata	81326	Apr 21, 1894	Aug 31, 1918
Laplata	La Plata	81326	Dec 09, 1918	Jul 23, 1934
Laporte	Larimer	80535	Dec 21, 1894	open
Larand	Jackson		Oct 08, 1914	Aug 15, 1916
Lariat	Rio Grande	81144	Aug 08, 1881	Apr 16, 1884
Larimer (Note: The Larimer, Colorado, post office was renamed Mustang on January 21, 1914.)	Huerfano		Jul 01, 1907	Jan 21, 1914
Larkspur	Douglas	80118	Dec 13, 1871	Jul 27, 1892
Larkspur	Douglas	80118	Aug 26, 1892	open
Las Animas (1871) (Note: The old Las Animas, Colorado, post office closed on June 8, 1883. The West Las Animas, Colorado, post office was renamed Las Animas on September 4, 1886.)	Bent	81054	Apr 04, 1871	Apr 11, 1877
Las Animas (1871)	Bent	81054	May 01, 1877	Jun 08, 1883
Las Animas	Bent	81054	Sep 04, 1886	open
LaSalle	Weld	80645		
Lasauses	Conejos	81151	Feb 28, 1895	Jul 31, 1920
Lascar	Huerfano	81069	Jan 27, 1916	Jan 20, 1949
Latham (Note: The Cherokee City, Colorado Territory, post office was renamed Latham on November 25, 1863, and was then renamed Evans on May 16, 1870.)	Weld	80620	Nov 25, 1863	Oct 22, 1864
Latham	Weld	80620	Mar 14, 1867	May 16, 1870
Laub	Las Animas		Dec 15, 1916	Apr 30, 1923
Laura	Logan		Apr 16, 1908	Jun 30, 1916
Laurette (Note: Located at an elevation of 10,761 feet (3,280 m), the Laurette, Colorado Territory, post office was the highest elevation U.S. post office from its opening on Nov 14, 1861 until its closing on January 24, 1873. The Laurette post office was renamed Buckskin on December 21, 1865.)	Park		Nov 14, 1861	Dec 21, 1865
Laurium	Summit		May 06, 1895	Apr 01, 1899
Lavalley	Costilla		Aug 14, 1903	Aug 15, 1918
Lavender	Bent		Jun 20, 1873	Apr 06, 1874
Lavender	Dolores		Aug 10, 1888	Dec 31, 1909
Lavender	Dolores		Nov 05, 1913	Feb 27, 1915
Laveta Pass (Note: The Veta Pass, Colorado, post office in Huerfano County closed on October 16, 1890, but reopened on the other side of the pass in Costilla County as Laveta Pass on January 5, 1904, but was then renamed Veta Pass on April 13, 1911.)	Costilla	81133	Jan 05, 1904	Apr 13, 1911
Lawrence	Ouray		Feb 05, 1883	Feb 11, 1884
Lawrence	Teller		Feb 03, 1892	Apr 22, 1898
Lawson	Clear Creek	80436	Jun 29, 1877	Aug 31, 1966
Lay	Moffat	81625	Aug 01, 1881	Jan 07, 1892
Lay	Moffat	81625	Sep 29, 1892	Jun 30, 1976
Lazear	Delta	81420	Jan 29, 1912	open
Le Roy (Note: The spelling of the Le Roy, Colorado, post office was changed to Leroy on August 2, 1895.)	Logan	80728	Jul 02, 1888	Aug 02, 1895
Leader	Adams	80103	Mar 26, 1910	Dec 31, 1940
Leadville	Lake	80461, 80429	Jul 16, 1877	open
Leal	Grand		Sep 17, 1904	Apr 30, 1930
Leavick	Park		Dec 29, 1896	Aug 31, 1899
Lebanon	Montezuma	81323	Sep 29, 1908	Apr 15, 1939
Lebanon	Pueblo		Apr 16, 1875	Jun 06, 1876
Lees	Pueblo		Aug 03, 1897	May 14, 1904
Left Hand	Boulder		Apr 25, 1872	Dec 26, 1879
Lehman	Grand		Mar 31, 1903	Oct 04, 1911
Lena	Arapahoe		Oct 04, 1895	Jun 17, 1896
Lenado	Pitkin		Feb 04, 1891	Sep 08, 1893
Lenado	Pitkin		Oct 02, 1905	Jan 02, 1907
Leon	Mesa		Apr 13, 1883	Aug 03, 1883
Leonard	San Miguel		Mar 23, 1900	Dec 31, 1940
Leopard (Note: The Leopard, Colorado, post office closed on April 6, 1892, but reopened as Sams on May 7, 1903.)	San Miguel	81430	Oct 06, 1890	Apr 06, 1892
Leroy	Logan	80728	Aug 02, 1895	Jun 30, 1918
Leslie	Washington		Jun 06, 1888	Mar 02, 1896
Lester	Huerfano		Mar 05, 1910	May 31, 1929
Levinson	Weld		Apr 12, 1906	Jun 29, 1906
Lewis	Montezuma	81327	Sep 07, 1911	open
Liberty (Note: The Parma, Colorado, post office was renamed Liberty on October 11, 1887. The Liberty Post Office closed on April 30, 1898, but reopened as Parma on March 27, 1906.)	Alamosa	81144	Oct 11, 1887	Apr 30, 1898
Liberty	Saguache		Nov 01, 1900	Oct 31, 1919
Liberty	Saguache		Oct 14, 1920	Mar 31, 1921
Lillian Springs	Logan		Jul 23, 1863	Apr 09, 1864
Lily	Moffat		Sep 17, 1889	Aug 22, 1898
Lily	Moffat		Aug 03, 1903	May 15, 1937
Lime	Pueblo		Apr 13, 1898	Jun 30, 1943
Limon (Note: The name of the Limon Station, Colorado, post office was shortened to Limon on November 14, 1903.)	Lincoln	80828, 80826	Nov 14, 1903	open
Limon Station	Lincoln	80828	Aug 06, 1889	Nov 14, 1903
Lincoln City (Note: The Paige City, Colorado Territory, post office was renamed Lincoln City on August 1, 1861.)	Summit	80424	Aug 01, 1861	Jul 10, 1894
Lindland	Jackson		Sep 18, 1922	Apr 30, 1937
Lindon	Washington	80740	Sep 21, 1888	open
Link	Las Animas		Jan 11, 1910	Feb 29, 1912
Linwood (Note: The Dodsonville, Colorado Territory, post office was renamed Linwood on April 14, 1876.)	Las Animas		Apr 17, 1876	Nov 11, 1886
Littell	Fremont		Dec 07, 1911	Jan 15, 1915
Little Beaver	Rio Blanco		Sep 13, 1919	Jul 15, 1925
Little Orphan (Note: The Little Orphan, Colorado Territory, post office was renamed Badito on September 12, 1865.)	Huerfano	81089	May 01, 1865	Sep 12, 1865
Little Thompson (Note: The Little Thompson, Colorado, post office was renamed Berthoud on April 4, 1878.)	Larimer	80513	Apr 05, 1875	Apr 04, 1878
Littleton	Arapahoe; Jefferson; Douglas	80120-80130; 80160-80166	Apr 08, 1869	open
Livermore	Larimer	80536	Dec 01, 1871	open
Living Springs	Adams	80136	Jul 05, 1865	Nov 27, 1867
Lizard Head	Dolores		Jul 23, 1892	Oct 31, 1895
Lizard Head	San Miguel		Mar 01, 1898	Jun 27, 1898
Lizard Head	San Miguel		Jul 25, 1898	Nov 03, 1898
Lobatos (Note: The Cenicero, Colorado, post office was renamed Lobatos on March 14, 1902.)	Conejos	81120	Mar 14, 1902	Oct 14, 1911
Lobatos	Conejos	81120	Oct 14, 1912	Dec 13, 1920
Lochbuie	Weld	80603		
Lockett	Saguache		May 22, 1889	Jan 14, 1905
Loco	Kit Carson		Mar 11, 1903	May 31, 1922
Lodge	Gunnison		Apr 13, 1911	Feb 14, 1920
Lodore	Moffat		Mar 25, 1924	Nov 30, 1933
Log Lane Village	Morgan	80705		
Logan	Arapahoe		May 14, 1887	Jul 31, 1901
Logcabin	Larimer		Jun 24, 1903	May 31, 1942
Loma (Note: The Mainard, Colorado, post office was renamed Loma on August 2, 1905.)	Mesa	81524	Aug 02, 1905	open
Loma	Rio Grande		Apr 01, 1867	Jan 28, 1873
Loma	Rio Grande		Jul 23, 1873	Jul 22, 1875
Lombard	Clear Creek		Dec 30, 1914	Jul 15, 1919
London	Park		Jun 25, 1883	Aug 27, 1886
Lone Dome (Note: The spelling of the Lone Dome, Colorado, post office was changed to Lonedome on December 6, 1894.)	Montezuma		Oct 25, 1883	Dec 06, 1894
Lone Oak	Las Animas		Jan 23, 1922	Jan 14, 1928
Lone Tree	Douglas	80124, 80112; 80134	NA	open
Lonedome	Montezuma		Dec 06, 1894	Jan 02, 1907
Longmont	Boulder; Weld	80501-80504	Apr 14, 1873	open
Longs Peak	Larimer		Jul 23, 1909	Jun 30, 1936
Longview	Jefferson	80433	Apr 04, 1911	Sep 15, 1937
Loretto	Denver	80130	Sep 28, 1896	Mar 11, 1966
Los Cerritos	Conejos	81151	Jun 03, 1889	Apr 15, 1914
Los Mogotes	Saguache		Jul 28, 1888	Jan 08, 1890
Los Pinos (Note: The Los Pinos, Colorado, post office was renamed Bayfield on February 25, 1899.)	La Plata	81122	Jan 18, 1889	Feb 25, 1899
Los Pinos	Montrose	81122	Feb 23, 1877	Jan 13, 1881
Los Pinos	Saguache		Nov 20, 1872	Feb 23, 1877
Los Sauses	Conejos		Jul 21, 1882	Feb 15, 1883
Lost Trail	Hinsdale		Jan 28, 1878	Sep 30, 1879
Lost Trail	Hinsdale		May 14, 1883	Aug 14, 1884
Lost Trail	Hinsdale		Jun 27, 1892	May 10, 1894
Louisville	Boulder	80027	May 21, 1878	open
Louviers	Douglas	80131	Jun 25, 1907	open
Love	Teller		Dec 29, 1894	Jul 15, 1902
Loveland (1871)	Larimer	80538	Apr 04, 1872	Jan 24, 1873
Loveland	Larimer	80538, 80534; 80537, 80539	Jan 10, 1878	open
Lowland (Note: The Lowland, Colorado, post office was renamed Wayne on January 15, 1909.)	El Paso		Aug 13, 1908	Jan 15, 1909
Loyd	Moffat		Feb 12, 1929	Feb 28, 1955
Loyton (Note: The Loyton, Colorado, post office was renamed Stunner on October 2, 1884.)	Conejos		Sep 10, 1884	Oct 02, 1884
Lucerne	Weld	80646	Jun 23, 1892	open
Ludlow	Las Animas		Feb 08, 1896	May 31, 1954
Ludlum	Yuma		Sep 16, 1889	Dec 24, 1890
Lujane	Montrose	81401	Sep 01, 1905	Jul 15, 1910
Lulu	Grand		Jul 26, 1880	Nov 26, 1883
Luslo	Lincoln		Aug 18, 1904	Nov 30, 1904
Lycan (Note: The Buckley, Colorado, post office was renamed Lycan on June 27, 1913.)	Baca	81084	Jun 27, 1913	Sep 12, 1975
Lyman	Arapahoe		Mar 02, 1885	Feb 15, 1895
Lyons	Boulder	80540	May 18, 1882	open
Lytle (Note: The Turkey Creek, Colorado, post office in El Paso County closed on October 25, 1881, but reopened as Lytle on August 12, 1885.)	El Paso		Aug 12, 1885	Mar 05, 1920

== M ==
Select the OpenStreetMap link at the right to view the location of some of the post offices in this section.

Post office	Current county	ZIP Code	Date opened	Date closed
Mace's Hole (Note: The Mace's Hole, Colorado, post office was renamed Beulah on October 25, 1876.)	Pueblo	81023	Apr 23, 1873	Oct 25, 1876
Mack	Mesa	81525	Apr 21, 1904	open
Macon	Teller		Feb 20, 1895	May 12, 1899
Madrid	Las Animas		Oct 03, 1882	Sep 29, 1892
Madrid	Las Animas		Oct 23, 1893	Oct 25, 1893
Madrid	Las Animas		Jan 06, 1896	Nov 30, 1917
Magic Mountain	Jefferson		Jul 16, 1960	Jun 01, 1962
Magnolia	Boulder	80466	May 16, 1876	Dec 31, 1920
Maher	Montrose	81415	Apr 07, 1884	Feb 26, 1988
Mahonville	Chaffee		Feb 28, 1876	Sep 18, 1879
Mainard	Mesa	81524	May 24, 1901	Oct 15, 1902
Mainard	Mesa	81524	Jan 06, 1905	Aug 02, 1905
Maine Ranch	Bent		Mar 05, 1872	Dec 22, 1875
Maitland	Huerfano	81089	Jan 31, 1898	Apr 15, 1935
Majestic	Las Animas		Aug 21, 1900	Dec 31, 1914
Majors	El Paso		May 22, 1911	Nov 30, 1912
Malachite	Huerfano		Nov 22, 1880	Apr 15, 1915
Maldonado	Las Animas		May 27, 1901	Jan 14, 1905
Malta	Lake	80461	Oct 26, 1875	Sep 13, 1887
Malta	Lake	80461	May 02, 1890	Jul 31, 1955
Mamre	Bent		Jun 04, 1886	Sep 13, 1886
Manassa	Conejos	81141	Feb 03, 1879	open
Mancos	Montezuma	81328	Feb 19, 1877	open
Mancos Creek	Montezuma		Jul 16, 1961	Jun 16, 1962
Manhattan	Larimer		Mar 19, 1887	Dec 31, 1900
Manitou (Note: The Manitou, Colorado, post office was renamed Manitou Springs on February 27, 1885, was then changed back to Manitou on May 20, 1892, and was then changed back to Manitou Springs on January 1, 1936.)	El Paso	80829	Oct 03, 1872	Feb 27, 1885
Manitou	El Paso	80829	May 20, 1892	Jan 01, 1936
Manitou Park (1888) (Note: The Summit Park, Colorado, post office moved to Manitou Park on March 19, 1888, and was renamed Woodland Park on February 20, 1890. A new Summit Park post office opened on March 17, 1890, and a new Manitou Park post office opened at a new location on June 30, 1890.)	Teller	80863	Mar 19, 1888	Feb 20, 1890
Manitou Park (1890)	Teller	80863	Jun 30, 1890	Feb 17, 1892
Manitou Springs	El Paso	80829	Feb 27, 1885	May 20, 1892
Manitou Springs	El Paso	80829	Jan 01, 1936	open
Manoa	Fremont		May 14, 1900	Dec 31, 1907
Manzanares	Costilla	81152	Feb 19, 1901	Mar 31, 1902
Manzanola (Note: The Catlin, Colorado, post office was renamed Manzanola on November 4, 1895.)	Otero	81058	Nov 04, 1895	open
Marble	Gunnison	81623	Mar 19, 1890	Feb 04, 1892
Marble	Gunnison	81623	Mar 02, 1892	Oct 31, 1942
Margaret	Costilla		May 22, 1899	Mar 31, 1900
Marigold	Teller		Oct 31, 1895	Jun 30, 1902
Marion	Delta		Feb 06, 1885	Aug 27, 1886
Marion	Garfield		Aug 06, 1889	Dec 19, 1891
Marion	Garfield		Feb 10, 1909	Jun 30, 1909
Marion	Garfield		Dec 10, 1909	Jan 31, 1912
Marnel	Pueblo		Sep 24, 1917	Nov 30, 1923
Marshall	Boulder	80305	Aug 02, 1878	Oct 05, 1880
Marshall	Boulder	80305	May 19, 1892	Apr 10, 1893
Marshall Park	Clear Creek		Jul 25, 1902	Nov 14, 1903
Marshall Pass	Saguache		Mar 06, 1919	Dec 31, 1940
Marshall Pass	Saguache		Feb 10, 1942	Sep 30, 1952
Marshalltown (Note: The Marshalltown, Colorado, post office was renamed Sargents on January 26, 1882.)	Saguache	81248	Jul 13, 1880	Jan 26, 1882
Martin	Grand		Aug 24, 1898	Nov 030, 1934
Martinsen	Las Animas		Jun 03, 1889	May 20, 1891
Martynia	Prowers		May 27, 1892	Jul 25, 1893
Marvel	La Plata	81329	Apr 01, 1953	open
Marvine	Rio Blanco		May 14, 1895	Jun 22, 1899
Marvine	Rio Blanco		Aug 19, 1913	Jan 15, 1934
Mason	Larimer		Jul 08, 1880	Oct 05, 1880
Masonville	Larimer	80541	Sep 01, 1896	open
Massadona	Moffat	81610	Jul 10, 1917	Oct 15, 1932
Masters	Weld		Feb 15, 1900	Dec 29, 1967
Matheson (Note: The Mattison, Colorado, post office was renamed Matheson on February 17, 1915.)	Elbert	80830	Feb 17, 1915	open
Mattison	Elbert	80830	Feb 13, 1889	Sep 19, 1895
Mattison	Elbert	80830	May 12, 1906	Feb 17, 1915
Maxey	Baca		Jan 19, 1889	Oct 09, 1894
Maxey	Baca		Jun 06, 1895	Jul 31, 1920
Maybell	Moffat	81640	Oct 14, 1884	open
Mayday (Note: Parrott, Colorado, was commonly known as Parrott City. The Parrott post office closed on October 31, 1898, but reopened as Mayday on September 4, 1913.)	La Plata	81301	Sep 04, 1913	Dec 31, 1914
Mayne	Huerfano		Jul 27, 1905	Dec 31, 1907
Maysville	Chaffee	81201	Jul 28, 1879	Dec 23, 1893
McClave	Bent	81057	Oct 20, 1908	open
McCollin	Lincoln		Jun 10, 1915	Nov 30, 1917
McCoy	Eagle	80463	May 23, 1891	open
McElmo	Montezuma		Mar 11, 1892	Mar 15, 1911
McElmo	Montezuma		Mar 16, 1912	Feb 29, 1932
McFerran	El Paso		Jan 19, 1889	Jul 30, 1896
McGregor	Routt	80487	Jul 01, 1915	Oct 31, 1942
McGuire (Note: The McGuire, Colorado, post office was renamed Camp Shumway on April 13, 1911.)	Huerfano		Nov 04, 1905	Apr 13, 1911
McMillan	Huerfano		Sep 07, 1900	Sep 15, 1904
McMillan (Note: The McMillan, Colorado, post office was renamed Toledo on April 16, 1887.)	Prowers		May 01, 1886	Apr 16, 1887
McPhee	Montezuma		Sep 17, 1924	Mar 31, 1948
McQuiety	La Plata		Mar 16, 1894	no operation
Mead	Weld	80542	Mar 01, 1907	open
Mears	Chaffee		Sep 29, 1879	Jun 06, 1882
Mears	Chaffee		Jan 31, 1883	Apr 25, 1888
Mears	Chaffee		Sep 25, 1907	rescinded
Medano Springs	Alamosa		Jan 29, 1874	May 11, 1875
Medano Springs	Alamosa		Jun 27, 1877	Jun 20, 1879
Medford Springs	Bent		Nov 08, 1916	May 31, 1922
Medill	Cheyenne		Dec 01, 1910	May 15, 1920
Medlin	Jefferson		Aug 15, 1896	May 31, 1901
Meeker (Note: The original White River, Colorado, post office moved to Meeker on August 23, 1880.)	Rio Blanco	81641	Aug 23, 1880	open
Meekton	Washington		Jul 07, 1910	Nov 30, 1918
Meily	Chaffee		Jun 02, 1882	Oct 30, 1883
Meily	Chaffee		Apr 09, 1884	Jun 16, 1885
Melville	Elbert		Jan 24, 1889	Jan 21, 1890
Melvin	Arapahoe		Mar 04, 1888	Dec 26, 1895
Menger (Note: The Wenger, Colorado, post office was renamed Menger on July 15, 1891.)	Las Animas		Jul 15, 1891	Nov 15, 1901
Menoken	Montrose		Oct 01, 1891	Jun 02, 1892
Mercier	Pueblo		Sep 22, 1906	Nov 30, 1913
Meridith	Crowley	81076	Nov 29, 1889	Jun 25, 1890
Meredith	Pitkin	81642	Jan 25, 1893	open
Merino (Note: The Buffalo, Colorado, post office was renamed Merino on February 21, 1883.)	Logan	80741	Feb 21, 1883	open
Mesa (1883) (Note: The first Mesa, Colorado, post office closed on March 4, 1884, but reopened as Fruita on April 4, 1884. The second Mesa, Colorado, post office opened in the Plateau Valley on April 29, 1887.)	Mesa	81521	Apr 12, 1883	Mar 04, 1884
Mesa	Mesa	81643	Apr 29, 1887	open
Mesa Verde National Park	Montezuma	81330	May 19, 1924	open
Mesaview	Las Animas		Oct 11, 1921	Sep 30, 1922
Meserole	La Plata		Sep 12, 1882	Jul 28, 1884
Mesita	Costilla	81152	May 27, 1910	NA
Messex	Washington	80741	Jun 18, 1907	Nov 30, 1942
Meyer	Costilla		Aug 25, 1885	Dec 10, 1885
Micanite	Fremont		Sep 30, 1904	Sep 30, 1925
Micheols	Larimer		Dec 27, 1919	no operation
Michigan	Larimer		Jul 26, 1880	Feb 23, 1882
Michigan House	Jefferson		Feb 28, 1863	May 05, 1863
Middle Boulder (Note: The Middle Boulder, Colorado Territory, post office was renamed Nederland on March 2, 1874.)	Boulder	80466	Sep 13, 1871	Mar 02, 1874
Midland	Teller	80814	Jun 27, 1892	Jan 04, 1895
Midland	Teller	80814	Feb 21, 1895	Aug 31, 1899
Mildred	Montezuma		Mar 18, 1895	May 30, 1903
Mildred	Yuma		May 21, 1910	Apr 30, 1954
Mill City (Note: The Mill City, Colorado, post office closed on May 26, 1879, but reopened on May 17, 1880, as the Dumont post office.)	Clear Creek	80436	Jul 05, 1861	Feb 10, 1863
Mill City	Clear Creek	80436	Mar 12, 1866	May 26, 1879
Millard	Montezuma		Sep 17, 1907	Jun 30, 1909
Millbrook	Custer		Mar 02, 1893	Nov 07, 1895
Millet (Note: The Millet, Colorado, post office closed on December 27, 1890, but reopened as the Platner post office on June 15, 1892.)	Washington	80743	Apr 08, 1890	Dec 27, 1890
Milliken	Weld	80543	Nov 10, 1909	open
Milner (Note: The Pool, Colorado, post office was renamed Milner on January 22, 1920.)	Routt	80487	Jan 22, 1920	Nov 18, 1920
Milner	Routt	80487	Jan 27, 1921	Oct 31, 1988
Minaret	Gunnison		Feb 25, 1890	Nov 14, 1896
Mindeman	Otero		Jun 09, 1917	Dec 31, 1934
Miner	Larimer		Mar 10, 1888	Sep 08, 1894
Mineral Hot Springs	Saguache	81143	May 09, 1911	Dec 15, 1947
Mineral Point	San Juan		Oct 29, 1875	Oct 14, 1878
Mineral Point	San Juan		Apr 23, 1879	Jan 28, 1897
Minneapolis	Baca		Aug 12, 1887	Nov 15, 1899
Minturn	Eagle	81645	Sep 17, 1889	open
Mirage (Note: The Cotton Creek, Colorado, post office was renamed Mirage on February 13, 1895.)	Saguache		Feb 13, 1895	Jan 31, 1927
Missouri City	Gilpin		Mar 24, 1860	Jan 03, 1863
Mitchell (Note: The Roudebush, Colorado, post office was renamed Mitchell on April 2, 1883.)	Eagle		Apr 02, 1883	Mar 31, 1909
Mobley	Routt		Mar 17, 1906	Jan 02, 1907
Model (Note: The Roby, Colorado, post office was renamed Model on October 26, 1912.)	Las Animas	81059	Oct 26, 1912	Aug 12, 2017
Modoc	Boulder		Jun 18, 1874	Oct 31, 1879
Moffat	Saguache	81143	Aug 20, 1890	open
Mogote	Conejos	81120	Aug 27, 1897	Dec 31, 1920
Molding	Dolores		Sep 16, 1919	Feb 29, 1924
Molina (Note: The Molina, Colorado, post office closed on September 1, 1896, but reopened as the Snipes post office on January 9, 1897. The Snipes post office was then renamed Molina on May 3, 1906.)	Mesa	81646	Apr 25, 1895	Sep 01, 1896
Molina	Mesa	81646	May 03, 1906	open
Monarch (Note: The Chaffee, Colorado, post office was renamed Monarch on May 14, 1883.)	Chaffee	81227	May 14, 1883	Nov 30, 1903
Monarch	Grand		Feb 12, 1907	Jan 15, 1909
Monarch	Grand		Oct 12, 1912	Feb 15, 1922
Monon	Baca		Nov 01, 1901	Apr 15, 1918
Montana (Note: On January 18, 1859, the United States Post Office Department authorized the first three post offices in the Pike's Peak gold region: Auraria, Kansas Territory; Montana, Kansas Territory; and St. Vrain, Nebraska Territory.) (Note: On October 1, 1859, the Montana, Kansas Territory, post office became the first post office to close in what would become the Territory of Colorado after most of its residents left for the Cherry Creek Diggings.)	Denver	80223	Jan 18, 1859	Oct 01, 1859
Montclair	Denver	80220	Jul 03, 1888	Mar 31, 1912
Monte Vista	Rio Grande	81144, 81135	Feb 18, 1886	open
Montezuma	Summit	80435	Jun 15, 1871	Jun 30, 1872
Montgomery (Note: The Montgomery City, Colorado Territory, post office closed on October 31, 1872, but reopened as the Montgomery post office on June 7, 1882.)	Park		Jun 07, 1882	May 03, 1888
Montgomery City	Park		Jul 21, 1862	Oct 31, 1872
Montrose	Montrose	81401-81403	Feb 14, 1882	open
Montville (Note: The Orean, Colorado, post office was renamed Montville on February 28, 1887.)	Alamosa		Feb 28, 1887	Jan 31, 1900
Monument	El Paso	80132	Apr 08, 1869	open
Mooney	Huerfano		Mar 26, 1896	Apr 15, 1896
Moore	Las Animas		Jul 11, 1904	Nov 17, 1904
Moqui	Montezuma		Jun 18, 1900	Apr 15, 1914
Moraine (Note: The Moraine, Colorado, post office was renamed Moraine Park on January 27, 1902.)	Larimer	80517	Mar 22, 1880	Jan 27, 1902
Moraine Park	Larimer	80517	Jan 27, 1902	Feb 15, 1921
Morapos	Moffat		Oct 14, 1912	Sep 30, 1931
Morgan (Note: The Morgan, Colorado, post office was renamed Freedom on May 14, 1901.)	Conejos	81140	Aug 25, 1900	May 14, 1901
Morgan	Montezuma		Oct 24, 1887	May 04, 1891
Morgan	Weld		Nov 26, 1879	Feb 15, 1883
Morland	Teller		Dec 09, 1891	Feb 04, 1892
Morley	Las Animas		Jan 11, 1882	Aug 03, 1882
Morley	Las Animas		Aug 27, 1884	Feb 16, 1885
Morley	Las Animas		Sep 26, 1888	Aug 31, 1907
Morley	Las Animas		Sep 12, 1907	Aug 24, 1956
Morris	Garfield		Jan 15, 1902	Apr 15, 1903
Morris	Kit Carson		Mar 18, 1907	Mar 15, 1914
Morrison	Jefferson	80465	Dec 12, 1873	Jun 08, 1908
Morrison	Jefferson	80465	Aug 01, 1950	open
Mosby	El Paso		Mar 24, 1910	Nov 30, 1913
Mosca (Note: The Streater, Colorado, post office was renamed Mosca on December 30, 1890.)	Alamosa	81146	Dec 30, 1890	open
Mosco	Alamosa		May 24, 1880	Feb 01, 1882
Mound	Teller		Mar 03, 1893	May 10, 1894
Mount Carbon	Gunnison		Aug 26, 1884	Jul 28, 1891
Mount Carbon	Gunnison		Mar 16, 1901	Jun 26, 1909
Mount Crested Butte	Gunnison	81225	Dec 1981	open
Mount Harris	Routt	80487	Apr 01, 1915	May 30, 1958
Mount Morrison	Jefferson	80465	Jun 08, 1908	Aug 01, 1950
Mount Pearl	Cheyenne	80825	Jul 27, 1911	Jan 31, 1923
Mount Princeton (Note: The Mount Princeton, Colorado, post office closed on June 19, 1899, but reopened as Mount Princeton Hot Springs on August 21, 1926.)	Chaffee	81236	Sep 17, 1889	Jun 19, 1899
Mount Princeton Hot Springs	Chaffee	81236	Aug 21, 1926	May 15, 1936
Mount Sneffels (Note: The name of the Mount Sneffels, Colorado, post office was shortened to Sneffels on April 3, 1895.)	Ouray		Oct 31, 1879	Apr 03, 1895
Mount Streeter	Moffat		Dec 26, 1919	Nov 15, 1921
Mount Vernon (Note: Mount Vernon was the home of Territorial Governor Robert Williamson Steele and administrative capital of the Provisional Government of the Territory of Jefferson.)	Jefferson	80401	May 09, 1860	Sep 29, 1866
Mount Vernon	Jefferson	80401	Jan 31, 1867	Mar 19, 1867
Mount Vernon	Jefferson	80401	Jun 29, 1869	Oct 11, 1875
Mount Vernon	Jefferson	80401	Mar 10, 1880	Jul 27, 1882
Mount Vernon	Jefferson	80401	Jan 13, 1885	Jul 09, 1885
Mountain City (Note: Located at an elevation of 8,498 feet (2,590 m), the Mountain City, Kansas Territory, post office was the highest elevation U.S. post office when it opened on January 17, 1860. Excavation of gold ore necessitated moving the post office uphill to Central City on October 8, 1869.)	Gilpin	80427	Jan 17, 1860	Oct 08, 1869
Mountain Park	Jefferson	80401	Aug 16, 1966	Sep 23, 1978
Mountain View	Jefferson	80212		
Mountain Village	San Miguel	81435		
Mountaindale	Park		Jan 05, 1880	Oct 11, 1899
Mountainvale	Mesa		Sep 14, 1884	Aug 31, 1903
Mountearl	Larimer		Oct 28, 1896	Jul 27, 1899
Mud Creek	Bent		Sep 04, 1911	Mar 30, 1918
Muddy Creek (Note: The Muddy Creek, Colorado, post office closed on November 19, 1886, but reopened as Abbey on May 29, 1891.)	Pueblo		Dec 08, 1870	Nov 19, 1886
Mullenville	Park		Jun 28, 1880	Jan 31, 1882
Mulvane	Prowers		Jun 08, 1888	Feb 20, 1893
Muriel	Huerfano		Aug 18, 1903	May 31, 1904
Muriel	Huerfano		Jul 12, 1904	Jan 31, 1906
Murnane	La Plata		Nov 10, 1882	Jul 08, 1886
Mustang	Huerfano		Jan 21, 1914	Jan 31, 1940
Myers	El Paso		Aug 11, 1891	May 10, 1894
Myrtle	Pueblo		Feb 23, 1906	Jul 15, 1913
Mystic	Routt		Jun 17, 1910	Nov 30, 1942

== N ==
Select the OpenStreetMap link at the right to view the location of some of the post offices in this section.

Post office	Current county	ZIP Code	Date opened	Date closed
Namaqua	Larimer	80537	Jan 28, 1868	Jan 03, 1879
Nantes	Weld		Aug 19, 1887	Feb 09, 1888
Naomi	Summit		Jan 04, 1883	Apr 03, 1888
Nast	Pitkin	81642	May 04, 1909	Aug 10, 1918
Nathrop (Note: The Chalk Creek, Colorado, post office was renamed Nathrop on September 8, 1880.)	Chaffee	81236	Sep 08, 1880	open
Naturita (Note: The Chipeta, Colorado, post office was renamed Naturita on September 15, 1882.)	Montrose	81422	Sep 015, 1882	open
Navajo	Archuleta		Sep 17, 1878	Nov 06, 1879
Navajo Springs	Montezuma		Dec 24, 1910	Apr 01, 1915
Nederland	Boulder	80466	Mar 02, 1874	open
Needleton	San Juan		May 26, 1882	Mar 18, 1892
Needleton	San Juan		May 05, 1892	Jun 22, 1896
Needleton	San Juan		Oct 20, 1896	Jan 31, 1910
Neeley	Custer		Feb 16, 1888	Dec 12, 1888
Nepesta	Pueblo	81039	Jun 07, 1876	Dec 31, 1929
Neva	Chaffee		May 17, 1882	Oct 06, 1882
Nevada (Note: The Nevada, Colorado Territory, post office was renamed Bald Mountain on December 16, 1869. The town was also known as Nevada City and Nevadaville.)	Gilpin	80427	Jan 12, 1861	Dec 16, 1869
New Castle (Note: The Chapman, Colorado, post office was renamed Newcastle on April 23, 1888, and later the spelling was changed to New Castle.)	Garfield	81647	NA	open
New Fort Lyon	Bent		Jan 17, 1908	May 31, 1908
New Haven	Logan	80728	Dec 07, 1910	Jun 30, 1916
New Liberty	Weld		Jul 17, 1876	Jun 18, 1884
New Memphis	Douglas	80104	Jan 08, 1872	May 18, 1874
New Raymer (Note: The Raymer, Colorado, post office operated from June 27, 1888, until May 14, 1895. On November 13, 1909, the New Raymer, Colorado, post office opened near the train station, about 640 feet (200 m) southwest of the original post office. The Town of Raymer, the State of Colorado, and the United States Census Bureau prefer the original name.)	Weld	80742	Nov 13, 1909	open
New Wattenberg	Weld	80621	Mar 09, 1911	Feb 29, 1916
New Windsor (Note: The name of the New Windsor, Colorado, post office was shortened to Windsor on August 19, 1911.)	Larimer	80550	Jan 18, 1884	Aug 19, 1911
Newcastle	Garfield	81647	Apr 23, 1888	NA
Newcomb	Conejos		May 15, 1884	May 13, 1886
Newett	Chaffee		Apr 22, 1895	Apr 30, 1893
Newett	Chaffee		Apr 30, 1903	Aug 10, 1918
Newfield	El Paso		Jul 30, 1896	May 28, 1898
Newmire (Note: The Newmire, Colorado, post office was renamed Vanadium on May 17, 1913.)	San Miguel		Apr 04, 1895	May 17, 1913
Newton	Yuma		Aug 06, 1889	Apr 15, 1918
Ni Wot (Note: The spelling of the Ni Wot, Colorado, post office was changed to Niwot on May 2, 1895.)	Boulder	80503	Apr 02, 1873	Oct 02, 1879
Ni Wot	Boulder	80503	Oct 31, 1879	May 02, 1895
Niccora	San Juan		Jul 16, 1877	Nov 26, 1877
Nichols	Rio Grande		Dec 22, 1903	Apr 02, 1904
Niegoldstown	San Juan		Jan 10, 1878	Aug 15, 1881
Ninaview	Bent	81054	Sep 20, 1915	Jul 30, 1965
Niwot	Boulder	80544; 80503-80504	May 02, 1895	open
Noel	San Miguel		Jul 23, 1909	Apr 30, 1919
Noel	San Miguel		Oct 30, 1919	Jun 30, 1923
Noland	Boulder	80503	Jul 16, 1890	Jun 11, 1895
Noland	Boulder	80503	Feb 21, 1899	Aug 31, 1901
Norma	Rio Grande		Dec 16, 1896	Dec 15, 1899
Norman	Costilla		Jun 25, 1890	Oct 16, 1890
Norrie	Pitkin	81642	Nov 16, 1894	Jul 17, 1906
Norrie	Pitkin	81642	Jul 01, 1907	Aug 10, 1918
North Avondale	Pueblo	81022	Aug 17, 1917	May 31, 1976
North Creede (Note: The Willow, Colorado, post office opened on May 12, 1891, but was renamed Creede on July 1, 1891. The nearby Amethyst, Colorado, post office opened on January 25, 1892. The Creede, Colorado, post office moved to North Creede on November 28, 1908, where it remained open until April 15, 1919. The Amethyst, Colorado, post office closed on February 2, 1909, but reopened as the new Creede, Colorado, post office on February 9, 1909.)	Mineral	81130	Nov 28, 1908	Apr 15, 1919
North Pole	El Paso	80809	Aug 01, 1956	May 10, 1975
North Star	Gunnison		Oct 11, 1889	May 18, 1894
North Veta	Huerfano		Jan 13, 1920	Feb 28, 1923
North Veta	Huerfano		Feb 18, 1927	Jun 30, 1934
Northdale	Dolores	81324	May 23, 1918	Aug 19, 1920
Northdale	Dolores	81324	Dec 17, 1920	Aug 31, 1946
Northgate	Jackson		Jan 16, 1912	Feb 15, 1918
Northglenn	Adams; Weld	80233-80234; 80241, 80260	1962	open
Northstar	Gunnison		Oct 16, 1900	Apr 30, 1903
Northway	Prowers		May 29, 1916	Aug 30, 1919
Norton	Prowers		Jun 29, 1899	Jun 15, 1915
Norwood	San Miguel	81423	Dec 22, 1887	open
Nowlinsville	Baca		May 29, 1916	Jun 14, 1919
Nucla	Montrose	81424	Dec 12, 1904	open
Nugget (Note: The Nugget, Colorado, post office was renamed Bowerman on October 28, 1903.)	Gilpin		Nov 21, 1895	Mar 15, 1901
Nunda	Huerfano		May 07, 1883	Oct 24, 1888
Nunn	Weld	80648	Sep 28, 1905	open
Nyberg	Pueblo	81006	Aug 06, 1889	Jul 31, 1918

== O ==
Select the OpenStreetMap link at the right to view the location of some of the post offices in this section.

Post office	Current county	ZIP Code	Date opened	Date closed
O.Z. (Note: The O.Z., Colorado, post office was moved to nearby Ramah on August 8, 1889.)	El Paso	80832	Jan 29, 1877	Aug 08, 1889
Oak Creek	Routt	80467	Feb 05, 1907	open
Oakes	Arapahoe		Jun 09, 1890	May 31, 1905
Oakview	Huerfano		Dec 03, 1907	May 31, 1930
Officer	Las Animas		Feb 24, 1917	Jun 30, 1938
Ohio (Note: Ohio, Colorado, is commonly known as Ohio City.)	Gunnison	81237	Jun 15, 1880	Dec 29, 1972
Ojo	Huerfano		Jun 14, 1880	Aug 10, 1881
Ojo	Huerfano		Apr 15, 1913	Aug 15, 1928
Oklarado	Baca		May 12, 1916	Jun 29, 1935
Olathe (Note: The Brown, Colorado, post office was renamed Olathe on June 04, 1896.)	Montrose	81425	Jun 04, 1896	open
Olava	Park	80448	Aug 27, 1936	Jan 01, 1948
Oleson	Adams		Jul 18, 1916	Jul 07, 1931
Olio	Jefferson		Feb 16, 1872	Aug 26, 1872
Olney (Note: The Olney, Colorado, post office was renamed Olney Springs on March 24, 1909.)	Crowley	81062	Jun 28, 1890	Mar 24, 1909
Olney Springs	Crowley	81062	Mar 24, 1909	open
Omar	Weld		Apr 17, 1915	Apr 30, 1917
Omar	Weld		Mar 21, 1922	May 15, 1923
Omer	Otero		Aug 30, 1900	Jul 31, 1909
Oneco	Moffat		Jul 12, 1900	Dec 14, 1901
Onine	Las Animas		Jun 06, 1918	Jun 30, 1921
Opal	Bent		Oct 28, 1913	Jul 31, 1923
Ophir (1878)	San Miguel	81426	May 17, 1878	Oct 31, 1918
Ophir (1878)	San Miguel	81426	Jun 12, 1920	Jan 31, 1921
Ophir	San Miguel	81426	Jun 03, 1922	open
Oranola	Kit Carson		Jul 07, 1888	Feb 19, 1889
Orchard	Morgan	80649	Mar 06, 1882	open
Orchard City (Note: Orchard City, Colorado, is now served by the Austin, Cory, and Eckert, Colorado, post offices.)	Delta	81410, 81414; 81418		
Ordway	Crowley	81063	Jun 25, 1890	open
Orean	Alamosa		Jun 22, 1881	Feb 28, 1887
Orient	Saguache		Oct 15, 1894	May 15, 1905
Oriental	Saguache		Mar 25, 1881	Feb 25, 1884
Oriska	Kit Carson		Dec 22, 1910	Dec 31, 1917
Oro City (Note: Located at an elevation of 10,708 feet (3,264 m), the Oro City, Kansas Territory, post office was the highest elevation U.S. post office from its opening on February 16, 1861, until November 14, 1861, and again from January 24, 1873, until February 8, 1875. The Territory of Colorado was organized on February 28, 1861.) (Note: Oro City served as the original seat of Lake County, Colorado Territory, from November 1, 1861, until 1866.)	Lake		Feb 16, 1861	Sep 19, 1895
Orodelfan	Boulder		Jun 09, 1876	Jan 03, 1881
Orr	Weld	80644	Mar 16, 1884	Dec 20, 1894
Orsburn	Elbert		Mar 02, 1885	Jan 28, 1896
Orson	Mesa		Oct 03, 1882	Jan 08, 1883
Orson	Mesa		Dec 15, 1890	Jun 20, 1894
Ortiz	Conejos	81120	May 23, 1890	Aug 15, 1931
Ortiz	Conejos	81120	Jan 08, 1935	Jan 12, 1943
Osage (Note: The Osage Avenue, Colorado, post office closed on January 31, 1882, but reopened as Osage on April 4, 1884.)	Pueblo		Apr 04, 1884	Oct 24, 1888
Osage Avenue	Pueblo		Apr 16, 1873	Jan 31, 1882
Osborn	Boulder		Sep 20, 1880	Feb 04, 1885
Osgood	Weld		Sep 02, 1910	Jun 30, 1928
Osier	Conejos	81120	May 15, 1882	Mar 11, 1887
Osier	Conejos	81120	Dec 22, 1887	Jul 29, 1889
Osier	Conejos	81120	Nov 02, 1889	May 31, 1928
Otis	Jackson		Feb 15, 1881	May 16, 1881
Otis	Washington	80743	Jan 11, 1886	open
Ouray (Note: Originally known as Uncompahgre City, Colorado Territory, the town changed its name to Ouray on October 28, 1875, in honor of the Tabeguache Ute chief Ouray, and to avoid confusion with the town of Uncompahgre in San Juan County.)	Ouray	81427	Oct 28, 1875	Mar 20, 1876
Ouray	Ouray	81427	May 09, 1876	open
Overland	Denver	80223	Apr 12, 1892	Feb 14, 1920
Oversteg	Gunnison		Aug 01, 1882	Mar 15, 1905
Overton	Pueblo		Apr 09, 1892	Dec 15, 1900
Ovid	Sedgwick	80744	Dec 12, 1907	open
Owen	Lincoln		Sep 26, 1908	Dec 31, 1915
Owl	Jackson		Dec 26, 1899	Oct 31, 1918
Oxford	La Plata	81137	Jan 13, 1908	Nov 30, 1954
Oxford (Note: The Oxford, Colorado, post office was renamed Fowler on September 6, 1890, and was then renamed Alexander on March 20, 1900, but was then changed back to Fowler 11 days later.)	Otero	81039	Apr 27, 1882	Sep 06, 1890

== P–Z ==
- List of post offices in Colorado from P through Z

Colorado post offices: A B C D E F G H I J K L M N O P Q R S T U V W X Y Z

== See also ==
- Bibliography of Colorado
- Geography of Colorado
- History of Colorado
- Index of Colorado-related articles
- List of Colorado-related lists
  - List of populated places in Colorado
    - List of census-designated places in Colorado
    - List of municipalities in Colorado
  - List of ZIP Codes in Colorado
- Outline of Colorado
  - United States Postal Service
    - United States Post Office Department
