= Galeton =

Galeton may refer to:

- Galeton, Colorado
- Galeton, Pennsylvania
