= Platner, Colorado =

Unincorporated community in Washington County, CO, USA

- Unincorporated community
- Interactive map of Platner, Colorado
- Coordinates: 40°09′19″N 103°04′03″W
- Country: United States
- State: Colorado
- Counties: Washington County
- Elevation: 4,433 ft (1,351 m)
- Time zone: UTC-7 (MST)
  - Summer (DST): UTC-6 (MDT)
- ZIP code: 80743 (Otis)
- GNIS place ID: 182987

Platner is an unincorporated community in Washington County, Colorado, United States. The U.S. Post Office at Otis (ZIP Code 80743) now serves Platner postal addresses.
