= Marshall, Colorado =

Unincorporated community in Boulder County, CO, USA

Coordinates: 39.9555414°N 105.2297110°W

- Unincorporated community
- Interactive map of Marshall, Colorado
- Country: United States
- State: Colorado
- County: Boulder
- Elevation: 5,510 ft (1,680 m)
- Time zone: UTC-7 (Mountain (MST))
  - Summer (DST): UTC-6 (MDT)
- Postal code: 80301
- Area code: 720
- GNIS feature ID: 181244

Marshall is an unincorporated community in Boulder County, Colorado, United States. It is to the northwest of Superior.

== History ==
The area was named for Joseph Marshall, who set up his Consolidated Coal Company there in the 1860s. From 1880 to 1890, the area was called Langford, and Gorham during the early 1900s.

The Marshall Mine, located on Boulder Open Space property, had underground fire flare-ups in October 2003 and December 2005, when a small brush fire ignited and was easily extinguished.

On December 30, 2021, a grass fire originated in the vicinity of South Foothills Highway (Colorado State Highway 93) and Marshall Road (Colorado State Highway 170), purportedly on property owned by the Twelve Tribes religious group, devastating much of the area and the surrounding communities of Superior, Louisville, and Broomfield. Three weeks after the fire, underground mine fires were also considered as a possible source.
