= Sams, Colorado =

Unincorporated community in San Miguel County, CO, USA

Coordinates: 38°06′14″N 107°57′27″W

Sams is an unincorporated community in San Miguel County, in the U.S. state of Colorado.

== History ==
A post office called Sams was in operation between 1903 and 1950. Sams was named after the proprietor of a local sawmill.
