= Milner, Colorado =

Unincorporated community in Routt County, CO, USA

- Unincorporated community
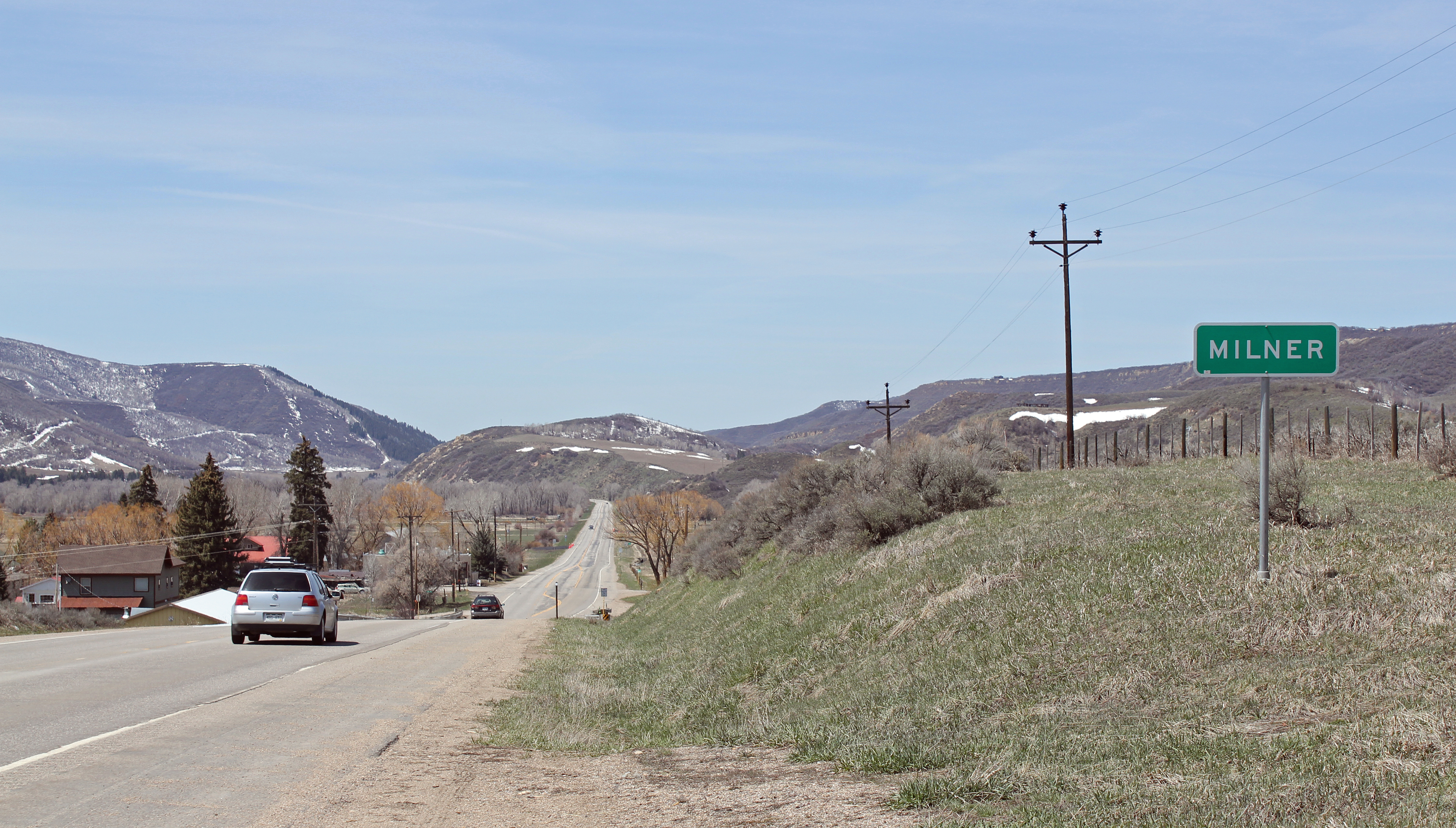
- Milner in May 2014
- Interactive map of Milner, Colorado
- Coordinates: 40°29′05″N 107°01′10″W
- Country: United States
- State: Colorado
- County: Routt
- Elevation: 6,523 ft (1,988 m)
- Time zone: UTC-7 (MST)
  - Summer (DST): UTC-6 (MDT)
- ZIP code: 80487
- Area code: 970
- GNIS feature ID: 171404

Milner is an unincorporated community in Routt County, Colorado, United States.

== Description ==
The elevation of the community is 6,522 feet (1,988 m) above sea level. Milner lies in the Mountain Time Zone (MST/MDT) and observes daylight saving time. The settlement is located along U.S. Hwy 40 between the nearby communities of Craig and Steamboat Springs.
