= Lytle, Colorado =

Coordinates: 38°36′09″N 104°52′04″W

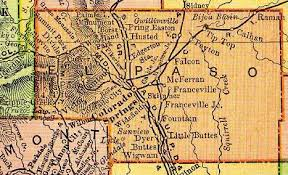
Early El Paso County Colorado map. Lytle is south of Colorado Springs, Colorado, near the Fremont County border.

Lytle is a ghost town located 12 miles south-west of Fountain in El Paso County, Colorado. The only building that remains is the Lytle School. The earlier name of the town was Turkey Creek. There was a Post Office from 1877 to 1881 and a Rural Post Office from 1885 to 1920.

== See also ==
- List of ghost towns in Colorado
