= Haybro, Colorado =

Extinct town in Routt County, Colorado

Haybro Junction City
- Extinct town
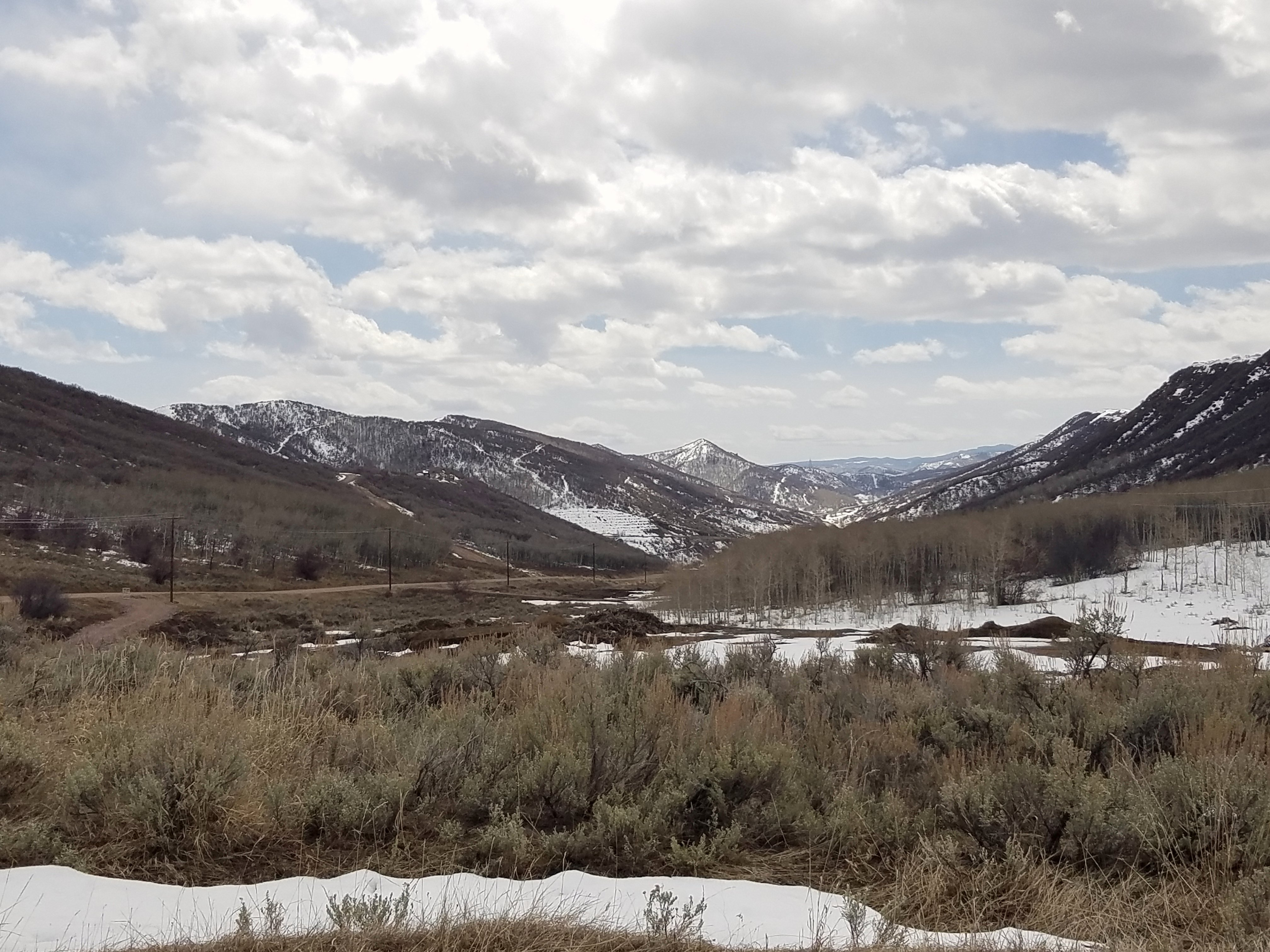
- Haybro, Colorado vicinity as viewed from County Road 179
- Interactive map of Haybro
- Coordinates: 39.4150°N 106.4781°W
- Country: United States
- State: Colorado
- County: Routt County
- Post office opened: May 15, 1918
- Post office closed: July 15, 1951

Haybro (also known as Junction City) is an extinct town in Routt County, Colorado, United States.

== History ==
The Haybro post office operated from May 15, 1918, until July 15, 1951. The community's name is a contraction of the Hayden brothers, proprietors of a local coal mine.

== See also ==
- Bibliography of Colorado
- Geography of Colorado
- History of Colorado
- Index of Colorado-related articles
- List of Colorado-related lists
  - List of ghost towns in Colorado
  - List of post offices in Colorado
- Outline of Colorado
