= Oxford, Colorado =

Unincorporated community in La Plata County, CO, USA

- Unincorporated community
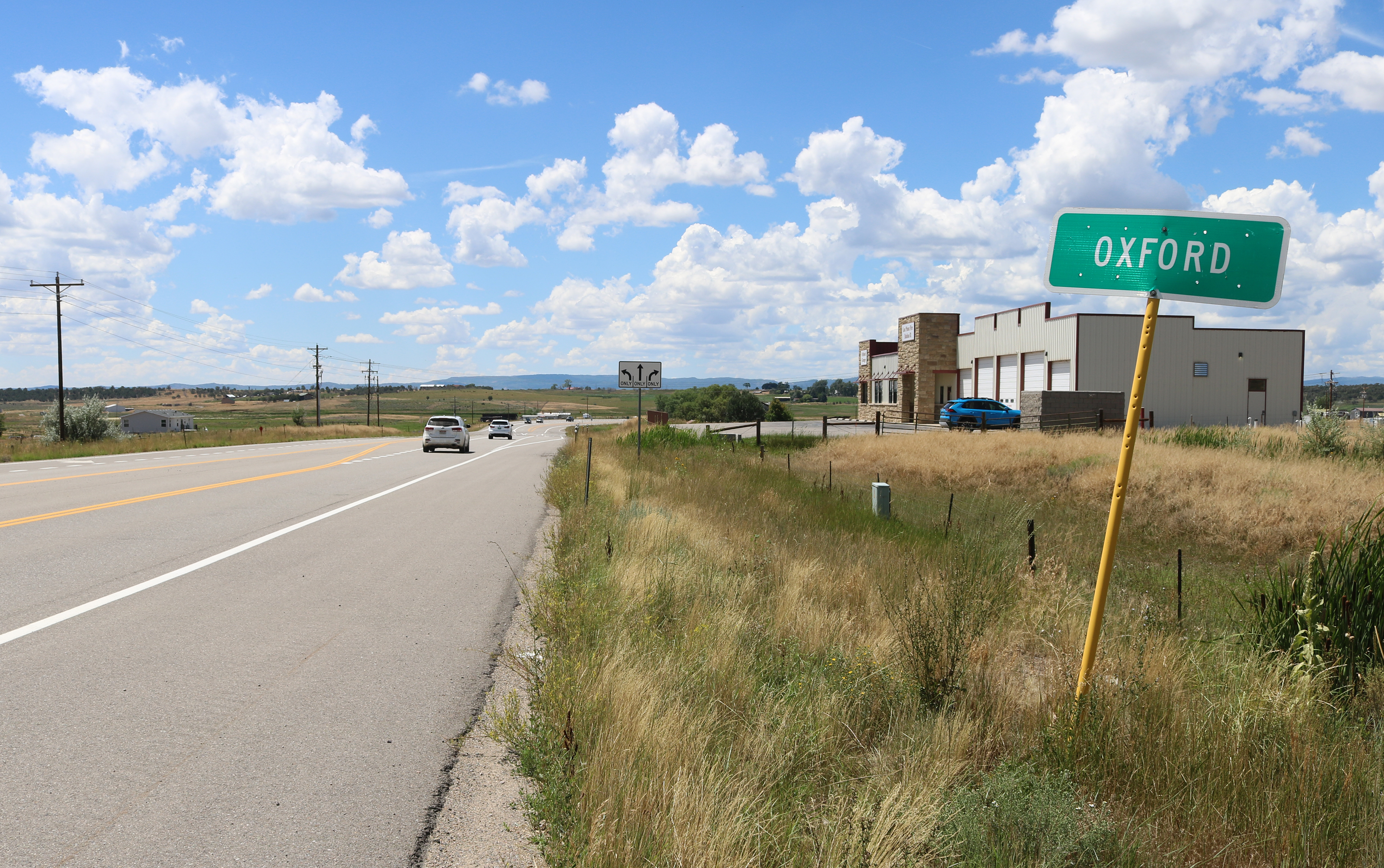
- Oxford and State Highway 172. The building on the right includes Los Pinos Fire Station #2.

- Location of Oxford, Colorado. Oxford (Colorado)
- Coordinates: 37°10′08″N 107°42′51″W
- Country: United States
- State: Colorado
- County: La Plata County
- Tribe: Southern Ute Indian Tribe

Government
  - Type: unincorporated community
  - Body: La Plata County
- Elevation: 6,601 ft (2,012 m)
- Time zone: UTC−07:00 (MST)
  - Summer (DST): UTC−06:00 (MDT)
- ZIP code: Ignacio 81137
- Area code: 970
- GNIS pop ID: 204733

Oxford is an unincorporated community on the Southern Ute Indian Reservation in La Plata County, Colorado, United States.

== History ==
The Southern Ute Indian Reservation was created on November 9, 1878. The community was originally named Grommet. The Grommet, Colorado, post office opened on May 3, 1904, but the name was changed to Oxford on January 13, 1908. The townsite map was recorded November 3, 1909 by The Oxford Land and Townsite Co. alongside the Denver & Rio Grande RR by J.M. Denning. The Oxford post office closed on Nov 30, 1954. The Ignacio post office (ZIP Code 81137) now serves the area.

== See also ==
- Durango, CO Micropolitan Statistical Area
- Southern Ute Indian Reservation
