= Marvel, Colorado =

Census-designated place in La Plata County, CO, USA

- Census-designated place
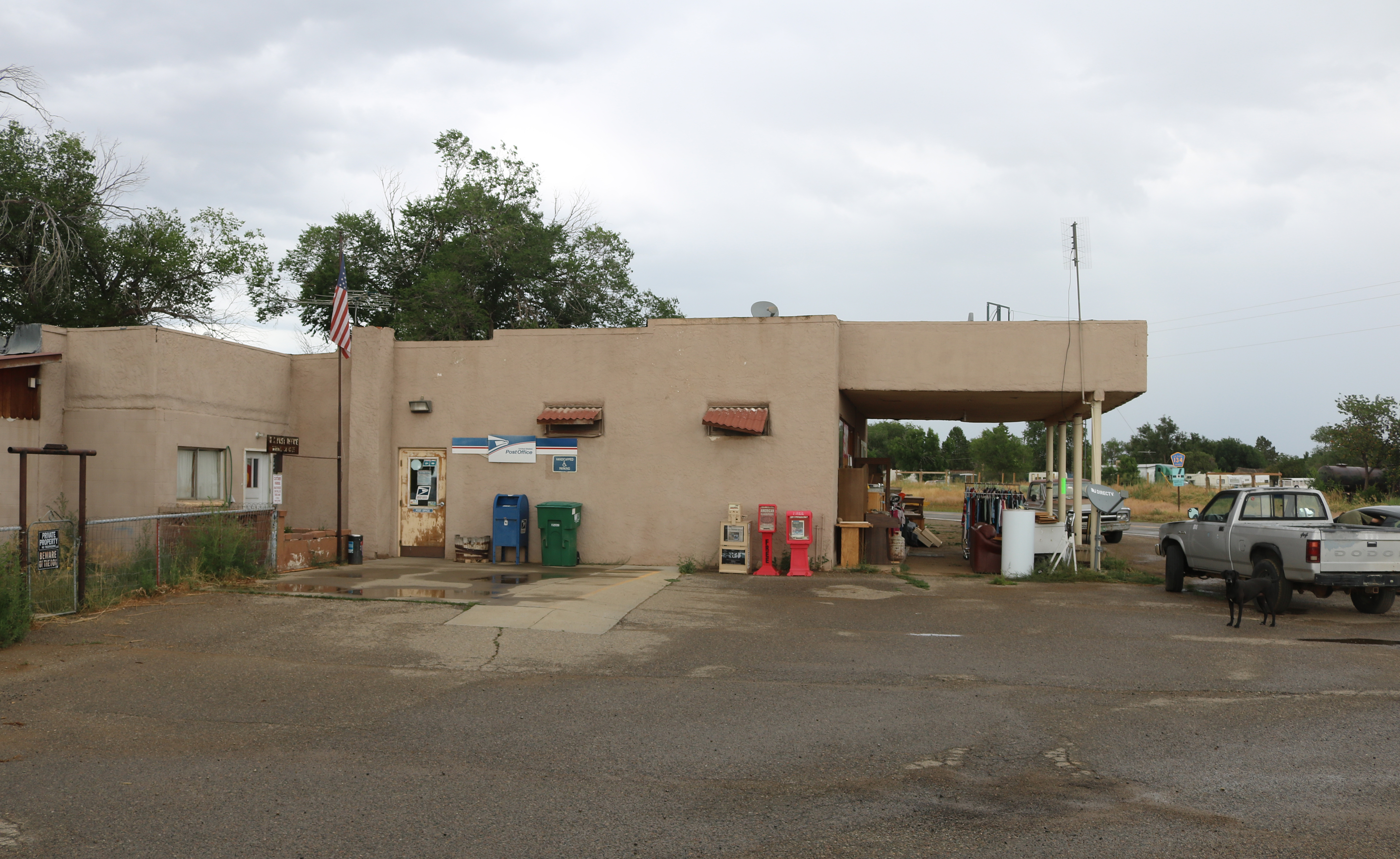
- Marvel post office, August 2019

- Location of Marvel, Colorado. Marvel (Colorado)
- Coordinates: 37°06′40″N 108°07′31″W
- Country: United States
- State: Colorado
- County: La Plata County
- Tribe: Southern Ute Indian Tribe

Government
  - Type: Unincorporated community
  - Body: La Plata County

Area
  - Total: 0.133 sq mi (0.345 km^{2})
  - Land: 0.133 sq mi (0.345 km^{2})
  - Water: 0 sq mi (0 km^{2})
- Elevation: 6,736 ft (2,053 m)

Population (2020)
  - Total: 68
  - Density: 510/sq mi (200/km^{2})
- Time zone: UTC−07:00 (MST)
  - Summer (DST): UTC−06:00 (MDT)
- ZIP Code: 81329
- Area code: 970
- GNIS town ID: 2805923
- FIPS code: 48940

Marvel is a census-designated place (CDP) and post office on the Southern Ute Indian Reservation in southwestern La Plata County, Colorado, United States. The population was 68 at the 2020 census. The CDP is a part of the Durango, CO Micropolitan Statistical Area. The Marvel post office has the ZIP Code 81329 (post office boxes).

== History ==
The Southern Ute Indian Reservation was created on November 9, 1878. The Marvel area was homesteaded in the late-1800s and early-1900s with ranching, farming, and oil extraction being the main economic drivers in the region. The Marvel, Colorado, post office opened on April 1, 1953.

== Geography ==
The area around Marvel is very dry and the region becomes more and more arid as one travels towards the New Mexico border and further away from the La Plata mountains. While the town lies within the Reservation, the land within and around the town is owned by private landowners and the reservation proper only starts several miles to the South and East of Marvel.

At the 2020 United States Census, the Marvel CDP had an area of 85 acres (0.345 km^{2}), all land.

== Demographics ==
Marvel CDP, Colorado
Year	Pop.	±%
2020	68	—
Source: United States Census Bureau

The United States Census Bureau defined the Marvel CDP for the United States Census 2020.

== See also ==
- Durango, CO Micropolitan Statistical Area
- Ute people
