= Mitchell, Colorado =

Former town in Eagle County, CO, USA

Coordinates: 39°23′30″N 106°19′09″W

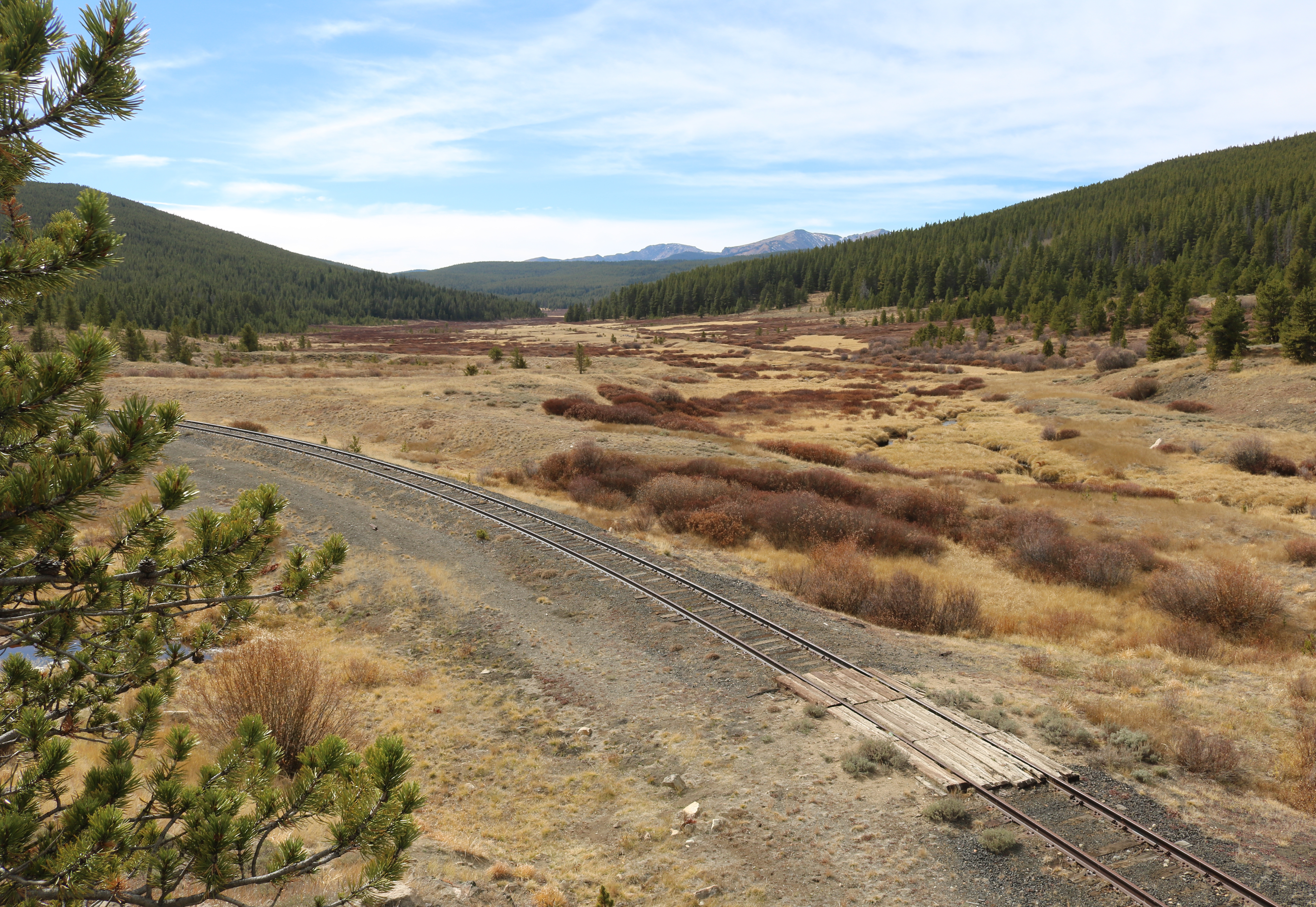
The site of Mitchell, Colorado

Mitchell is a former town in Eagle County, Colorado, United States. The GNIS classifies it as a populated place.

== History ==
A post office called Mitchell was established in 1883, and remained in operation until 1909. The community was named for George R. Mitchell, a settler.
