= Hillside, Colorado =

Unincorporated community in Fremont County, CO, USA

- Unincorporated community
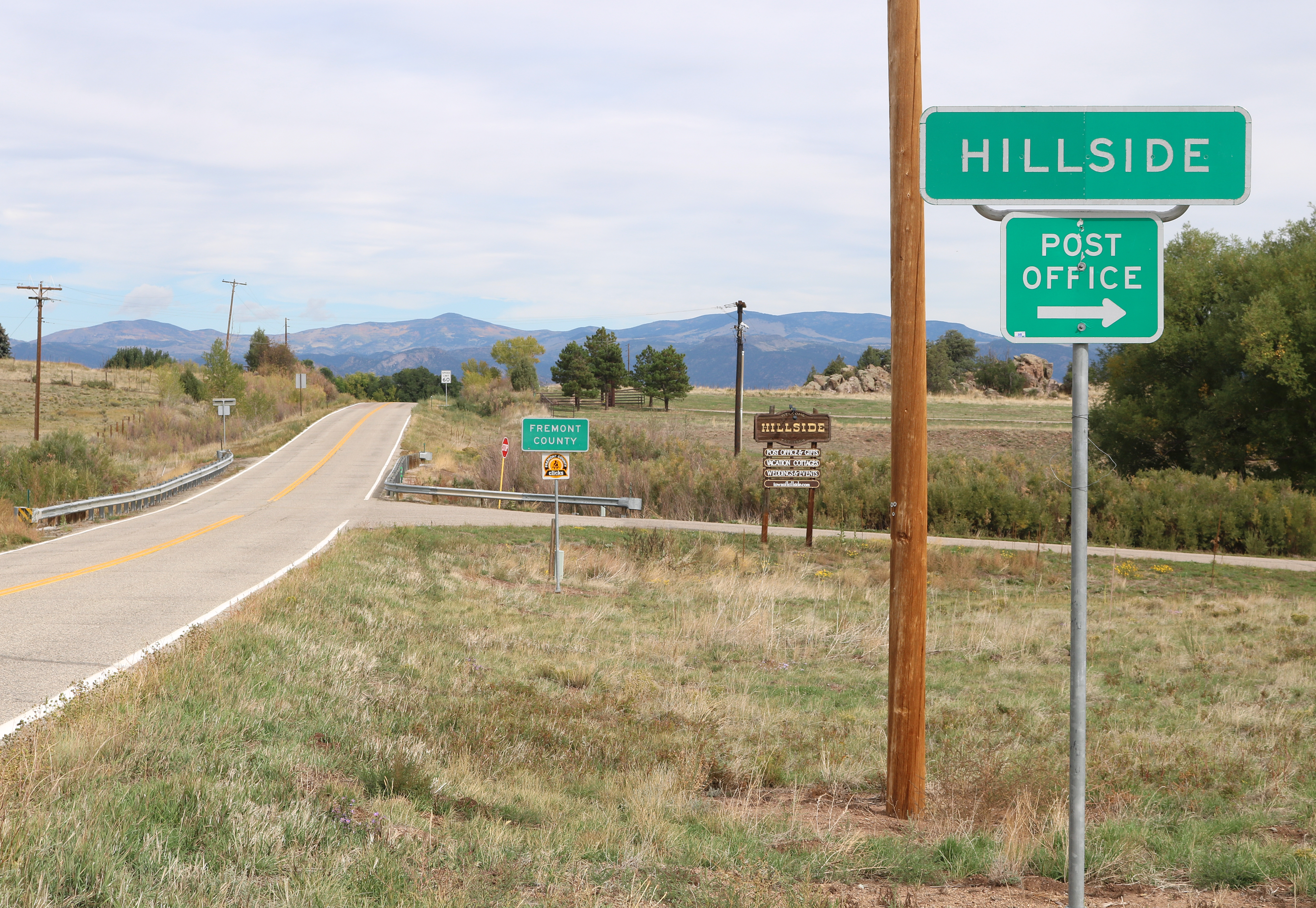
- Looking north along Highway 69 in Hillside
- Interactive map of Hillside, Colorado
- Coordinates: 38°15′55″N 105°36′42″W
- Country: United States
- State: Colorado
- Counties: Fremont
- Elevation: 7,490 ft (2,283 m)
- Time zone: UTC-7 (MST)
  - Summer (DST): UTC-6 (MDT)
- ZIP code: 81232
- GNIS town ID: 191803

Hillside is an unincorporated community and a U.S. Post Office in Fremont County, Colorado, United States. The Hillside Post Office has the ZIP Code 81232.

== Geography ==
Hillside is located in the Wet Mountain Valley along the eastern slope of the Sangre de Cristo Mountains.
