= Laird, Colorado =

Unincorporated community in Yuma County, CO, USA

- Census-designated place
- Location within Yuma County and Colorado
- Coordinates: 40°04′54″N 102°06′07″W
- Country: United States
- State: Colorado
- County: Yuma

Area
  - Total: 0.150 sq mi (0.389 km^{2})
  - Land: 0.150 sq mi (0.389 km^{2})
  - Water: 0 sq mi (0.000 km^{2})
- Elevation: 3,406 ft (1,038 m)

Population (2020)
  - Total: 46
  - Density: 310/sq mi (120/km^{2})
- Time zone: UTC−7 (MST)
  - Summer (DST): UTC−6 (MDT)
- ZIP Code: 80758
- Area code: 970
- FIPS code: 08-42000
- GNIS ID: 2583256

Laird is an unincorporated community and a census-designated place (CDP) in Yuma County, Colorado, United States. The population of the Laird CDP was 46 at the United States Census 2020.

== History ==
Laird has the name of James Laird, a Nebraska legislator. "Laird" is the Scots language word for a "lord".

The Laird post office began operation in 1887. The Wray post office (Zip Code 80758) serves Laird postal addresses.

== Geography ==
The Laird CDP has an area of 96 acres (0.389 km^{2}), all land.

Laird has the lowest elevation of any community in Colorado at 3,402 feet (1,037 m).

== Demographics ==
The United States Census Bureau initially defined the Laird CDP for the United States Census 2010.

Historical population
Census	Pop.	Note	%±
2010	47		—
2020	46		−2.1%
U.S. Decennial Census

== See also ==
- Colorado census designated places
