= Sneffels, Colorado =

Ghost town in Ouray County, Colorado, United States

Coordinates: 37°58′31″N 107°44′59″W

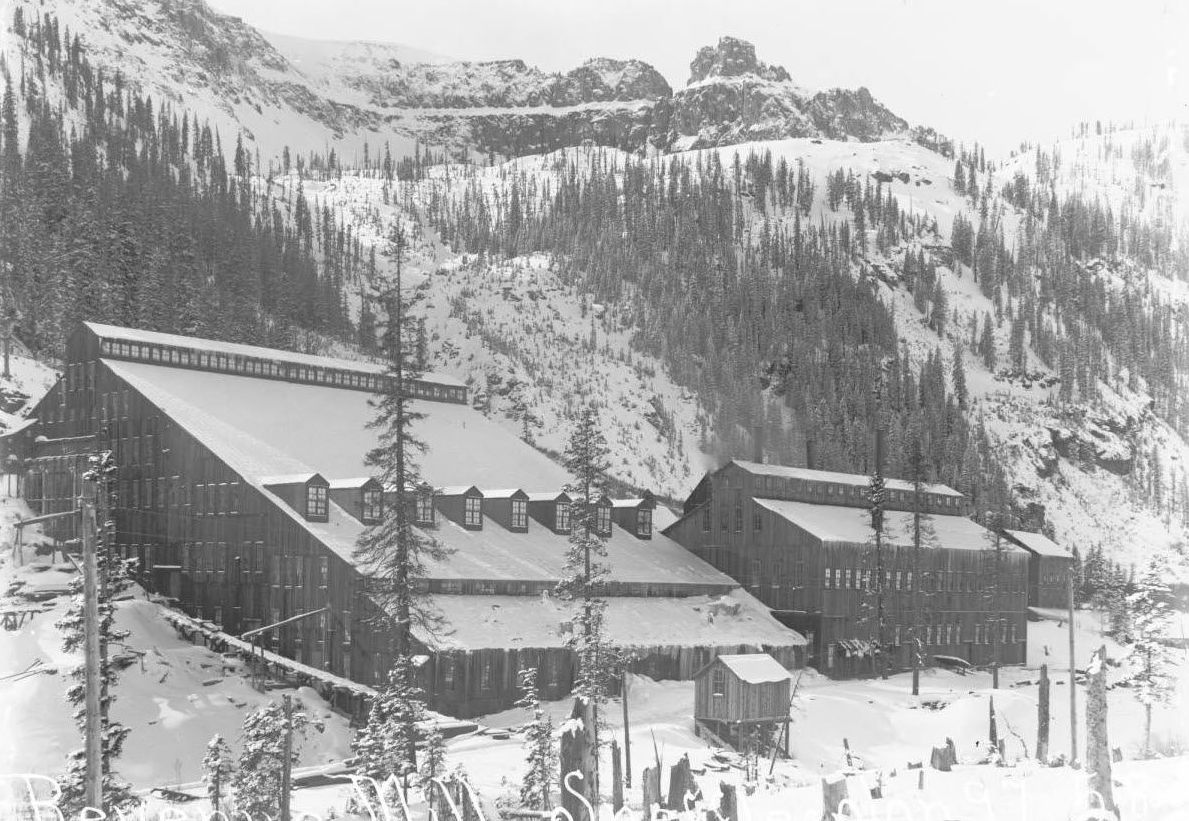
Revenue Mill at Sneffels, 1897

Sneffels was a town in Ouray County, Colorado, United States named after Mount Sneffels.

== History ==
=== Mining era ===
Sneffels was founded in 1875 and named after the mountain it was built on. The town peaked at 2000 people and grew largely between the mid-1880s until 1891. The Revenue Mill at Sneffels processed ore from the Virginius and other mines nearby. The mill complex employed around 600 men at its peak.

=== Modern day ===
Today there are scattered remnants and a few nearby residents.

== See also ==
- List of ghost towns in Colorado
