= Lasauses, Colorado =

Populated place in Conejos County, CO, USA

Los Sauces is a populated place in Conejos County, Colorado, United States, on the west side of the Rio Grande.

Variant names of the community listed in the Geographic Names Information System are La Sauses, Los Sauces, and Los Sauses.

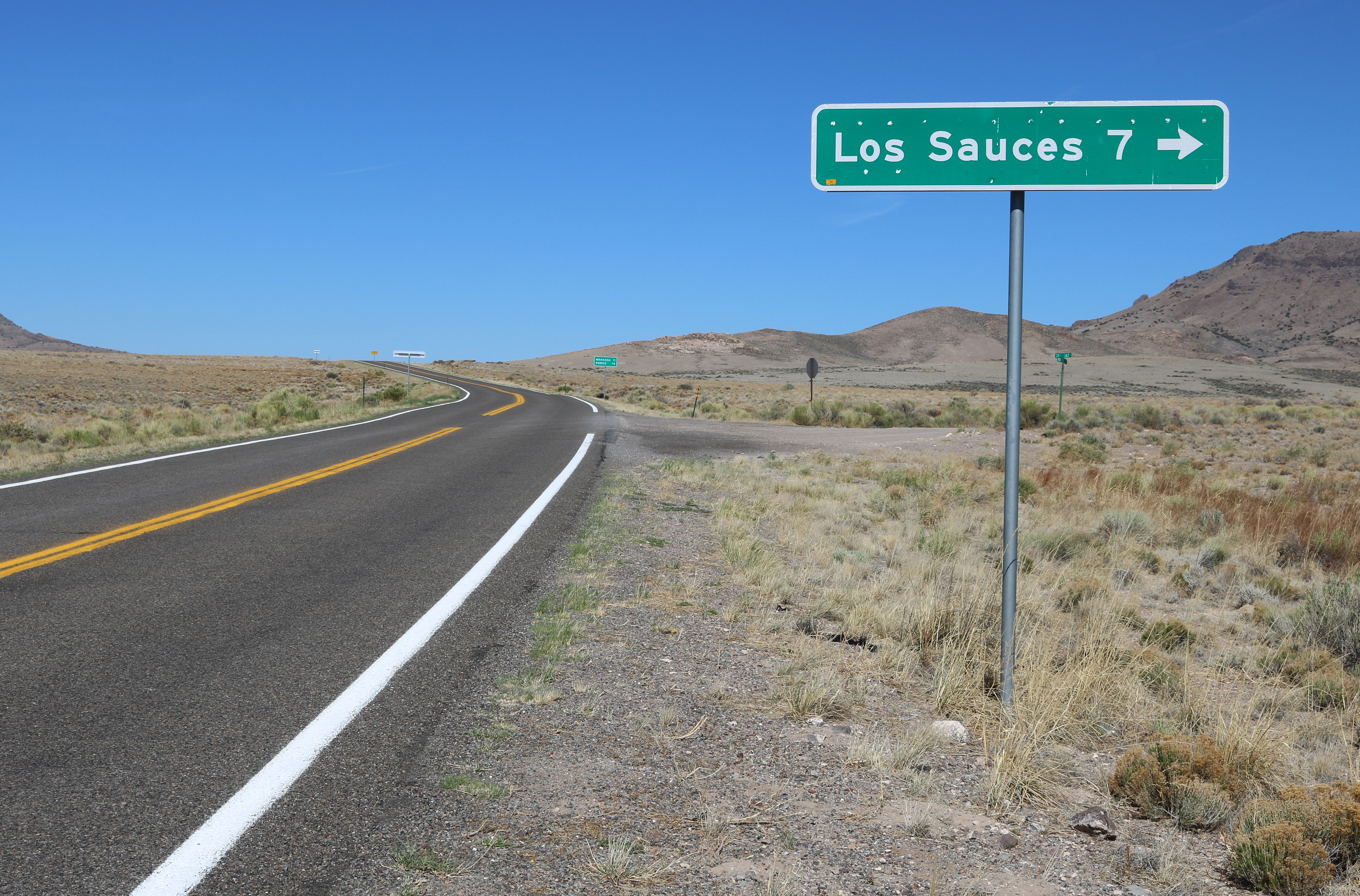
A sign along State Highway 142 indicating a turnoff for the community

The community came into being in the 1847 as a ford where stagecoaches and other wagons crossed the Rio Grande. Though small, it contained a store, dancehall, and a post office from 1895 to 1920. In 1941 (then population 150), it was written that the community was settled by Antonio Marquez, Jose Rodriques, and Fernando Borrego in 1863–64, and was called "Los Sauses," which is Spanish for "willows," and named after the trees along the river and lagoons that look like that tree. The name was intended to be "Los Sauses" but became "La Sauses" on a post office application, and the error was never fixed.

Despite the incorrect spelling, people from the region still refer to the town by the correct name, Los Sauces, and some highway signage has been changed to reflect the correct spelling of the town's name.

The adobe church La Capilla de San Antonio de Padua, first constructed in 1880, and replaced in 1928, is located in the community, and is listed in the Colorado State Register of Historic Properties.

== Location ==
- Lasauses 37°16′00″N 105°44′47″W
