= Highlandlake, Colorado =

Unincorporated community in Weld County, CO, USA

Coordinates: 40°14′52″N 105°00′52″W

Highlandlake is a tiny, unincorporated community in western Weld County, Colorado, U.S. It was founded in 1871 by "Deacon" Lorin Cassandre Mead on the eastern shore of a prairie pothole/buffalo wallow located about eight miles northeast of Longmont, Colorado.

== History ==
Highlandlake was founded in 1871 by Lorin C. Mead. He came to Colorado, arriving on June 1, 1871, in The Chicago Colorado Colony later known as Longmont, with the idea of purchasing land in the Greeley, Weld County, area. After taking a stage to Greeley, where he found that the best land was already taken up, he returned by stage to Longmont. On the way the stage passed a prairie pothole. Standing near the edge of the water was an antelope. Lorin was taken with the area and upon his return to Longmont, filed on the land around the pothole which he named Highland Lake, now owned by the nearby town of Mead. He named the town that eventually grew up around the lake, Highlandlake (which at times can be quite confusing to many people), after the lake in Sir Walter Scott's "The Lady of the Lake." In 1906, the much anticipated railroad bypassed the town of Highlandlake. Within a few years, all of the businesses and most of the homes in Highlandlake were picked up and moved to the new townsite of Mead, CO. Today, Highlandlake is a small unincorporated community in Weld County, Colorado.
