= Lindon, Colorado =

Unincorporated community in Washington County, CO, USA

- Unincorporated community
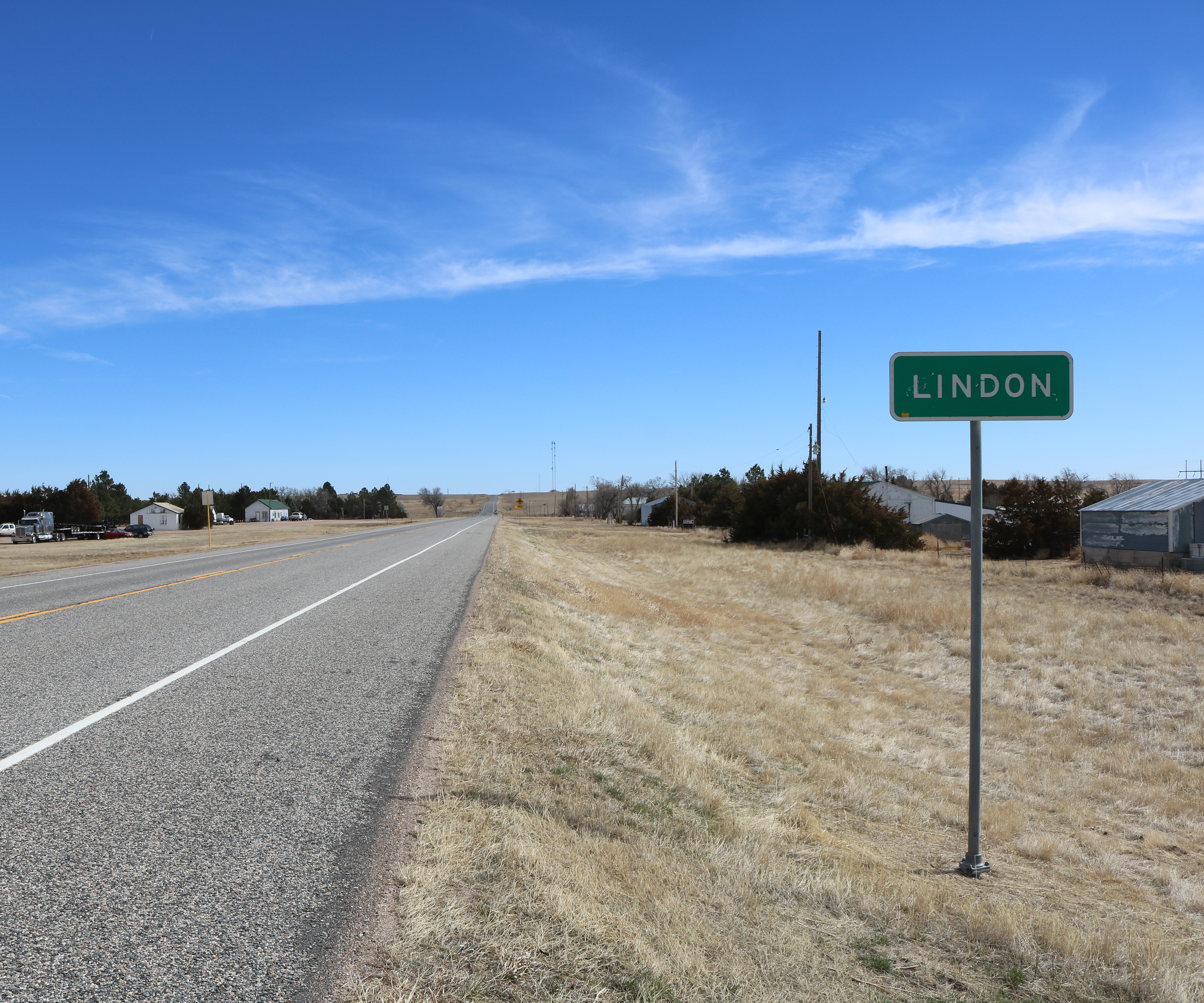
- Looking east on U.S. Route 36 in Lindon

- Location in Washington County and the state of Colorado Lindon, Colorado (the United States)
- Coordinates: 39°44′22″N 103°24′50″W
- Country: United States
- State: Colorado
- County: Washington
- Elevation: 4,918 ft (1,499 m)
- Time zone: UTC-7 (MST)
  - Summer (DST): UTC-6 (MDT)
- ZIP code: 80740
- GNIS feature ID: 204815

Lindon is an unincorporated community and a U.S. Post Office located in Washington County, Colorado, United States. The Lindon Post Office has the ZIP Code 80740.

== Geography ==
Lindon's previous names included Linden and Harrisburg.

=== Climate ===
According to the Köppen Climate Classification system, Lindon has a cold semi-arid climate, abbreviated "BSk" on climate maps. The hottest temperature recorded in Lindon was 108 °F (42 °C) on June 25, 2012, June 27, 2012, and July 27, 2026, while the coldest temperature recorded was −30 °F (−34 °C) on December 22, 1989.

Climate data for Lindon, Colorado, 1991–2020 normals, extremes 1988–present
Month	Jan	Feb	Mar	Apr	May	Jun	Jul	Aug	Sep	Oct	Nov	Dec	Year
Record high °F (°C)	76 (24)	79 (26)	88 (31)	90 (32)	97 (36)	108 (42)	108 (42)	105 (41)	102 (39)	92 (33)	88 (31)	76 (24)	108 (42)
Mean maximum °F (°C)	64.0 (17.8)	67.0 (19.4)	77.6 (25.3)	83.1 (28.4)	89.9 (32.2)	98.0 (36.7)	100.5 (38.1)	98.4 (36.9)	94.7 (34.8)	86.6 (30.3)	75.4 (24.1)	65.1 (18.4)	101.5 (38.6)
Mean daily maximum °F (°C)	44.4 (6.9)	46.5 (8.1)	56.8 (13.8)	63.9 (17.7)	73.3 (22.9)	85.3 (29.6)	91.9 (33.3)	89.5 (31.9)	81.7 (27.6)	67.8 (19.9)	54.5 (12.5)	44.6 (7.0)	66.7 (19.3)
Daily mean °F (°C)	28.7 (−1.8)	30.8 (−0.7)	40.1 (4.5)	47.1 (8.4)	57.0 (13.9)	68.3 (20.2)	74.8 (23.8)	72.6 (22.6)	64.0 (17.8)	50.1 (10.1)	38.0 (3.3)	29.1 (−1.6)	50.1 (10.0)
Mean daily minimum °F (°C)	13.0 (−10.6)	15.0 (−9.4)	23.4 (−4.8)	30.4 (−0.9)	40.6 (4.8)	51.3 (10.7)	57.6 (14.2)	55.6 (13.1)	46.2 (7.9)	32.5 (0.3)	21.6 (−5.8)	13.6 (−10.2)	33.4 (0.8)
Mean minimum °F (°C)	−7.8 (−22.1)	−5.6 (−20.9)	5.7 (−14.6)	15.9 (−8.9)	26.3 (−3.2)	38.3 (3.5)	48.9 (9.4)	46.9 (8.3)	32.4 (0.2)	14.8 (−9.6)	2.6 (−16.3)	−5.5 (−20.8)	−14.5 (−25.8)
Record low °F (°C)	−25 (−32)	−24 (−31)	−20 (−29)	0 (−18)	11 (−12)	30 (−1)	40 (4)	37 (3)	25 (−4)	−7 (−22)	−15 (−26)	−30 (−34)	−30 (−34)
Average precipitation inches (mm)	0.35 (8.9)	0.33 (8.4)	0.83 (21)	1.50 (38)	2.34 (59)	2.28 (58)	2.77 (70)	2.44 (62)	1.17 (30)	0.94 (24)	0.52 (13)	0.29 (7.4)	15.76 (399.7)
Average snowfall inches (cm)	4.1 (10)	3.9 (9.9)	4.3 (11)	2.8 (7.1)	0.2 (0.51)	0.0 (0.0)	0.0 (0.0)	0.0 (0.0)	0.5 (1.3)	2.1 (5.3)	4.2 (11)	4.8 (12)	26.9 (68.11)
Average precipitation days (≥ 0.01 in)	2.7	3.2	4.6	6.5	8.6	7.8	8.7	7.2	4.1	4.1	3.7	2.9	64.1
Average snowy days (≥ 0.1 in)	2.2	2.5	2.1	1.1	0.2	0.0	0.0	0.0	0.1	1.1	2.2	2.8	14.3
Source 1: NOAA
Source 2: National Weather Service
