= Galeton, Colorado =

Unincorporated community in Weld County, CO, USA

- Unincorporated community
- Interactive map of Galeton, Colorado
- Coordinates: 40°31′15″N 104°35′09″W
- Country: United States
- State: Colorado
- Counties: Weld
- Elevation: 4,771 ft (1,454 m)
- Time zone: UTC-7 (MST)
  - Summer (DST): UTC-6 (MDT)
- ZIP code: 80622
- Area code: 970
- GNIS place ID: 204692

Galeton is an unincorporated community in Weld County, Colorado, United States. The Galeton Post Office has the ZIP Code 80622.

A post office called Galeton has been in operation since 1910. The community was named for Miss Gale, the daughter of a local family of settlers.
