= List of post offices in Colorado: A–F =

Coordinates: 38.9972°N 105.5478°W

The 64 counties of the U.S. State of Colorado

This is a list of United States post offices which currently operate, or previously operated, in the area of the State of Colorado. For post offices currently in operation: the first ZIP Code is the ZIP Code of the postmaster. The postal service requires that each post office name be unique within a state or territory, however the name of a post office that closed or changed its name may be reused for another post office.

- See the List of populated places in Colorado for location information.
- See the List of ZIP Codes in Colorado for currently assigned 5-digit ZIP Codes.

Visual guide
Post offices currently in operation
Post offices that have been renamed
Postal addresses now served by another post office
Former post offices

Colorado post offices: A B C D E F G H I J K L M N O P Q R S T U V W X Y Z

== A ==
Select the OpenStreetMap link at the right to view the location of some of the post offices in this section.

Post office	Current county	ZIP Code	Date opened	Date closed
Abarr	Yuma	80759	Feb 26, 1923	Nov 30, 1947
Abbey (Note: The Muddy Creek, Colorado, post office closed on November 19, 1886, but reopened as Abbey on May 29, 1891.)	Pueblo		May 29, 1891	Dec 31, 1914
Abbeyville (Note: On November 20, 1882, the Hillerton, Colorado, post office was moved to Abbeyville.)	Gunnison	81210	Nov 20, 1882	Dec 03, 1884
Abbott	Washington		Aug 06, 1887	Apr 15, 1926
Aberdeen	Gunnison	81230	Feb 15, 1890	Jun 16, 1891
Abeyta (Note: Abeyta, Colorado, was previously known as San Isidro.)	Las Animas	81081	Dec 19, 1914	Dec 1914
Abeyton	Las Animas	81020	Mar 07, 1884	Aug 20, 1890
Acequia	Douglas	80125	Jan 30, 1874	Jun 09, 1881
Acequia	Douglas	80125	Apr 22, 1887	Jul 14, 1900
Ackmen	Montezuma		Nov 05, 1917	May 31, 1941
Adams (Note: The Bush, Colorado, post office was renamed Adams on September 10, 1885.)	Larimer		Sep 10, 1885	Jan 19, 1897
Adams City (Note: On October 11, 1963, the Adams City, Colorado, post office became a branch of the Commerce Town post office.)	Adams	80022	Sep 26, 1923	Oct 11, 1963
Adelaide	Fremont		Nov 15, 1894	Nov 15, 1901
Adelaide	Lake	80461	Sep 27, 1878	May 12, 1879
Adena	Morgan		Nov 08, 1910	Sep 15, 1949
Adrian	Summit		Apr 12, 1882	Aug 31, 1882
Agate (Note: The Gebhard, Colorado, post office was renamed Agate on April 24, 1882.)	Elbert	80101	Apr 24, 1882	open
Agate	Pueblo	80101	Apr 07, 1880	Apr 15, 1881
Aguilar	Las Animas	81020	Dec 16, 1890	open
Airport (Note: On August 31, 1955, the Airport, Colorado, post office was made a rural station of the Pueblo.)	Pueblo		Dec 01, 1953	Aug 31, 1955
Akron	Washington	80720	Jan 30, 1883	open
Alamo (Note: The Alamo, Colorado, post office was renamed Butte Valley on October 1, 1938.)	Huerfano	81089	Feb 21, 1923	Oct 01, 1938
Alamosa	Alamosa	81101-81102	Mar 12, 1878	open
Albano	El Paso		Oct 27, 1904	Nov 30, 1912
Albany	Prowers		Jul 21, 1887	May 01, 1891
Albany	Prowers		Jun 23, 1902	Sep 30, 1905
Alcott (Note: The Berkeley, Colorado, post office was renamed Alcott on May 18, 1896.)	Denver	80212	May 18, 1896	Jun 30, 1904
Alcreek	Las Animas		Jul 28, 1916	Feb 28, 1935
Alda	Delta		May 02, 1913	Dec 15, 1914
Alder	Saguache	81155	Aug 29, 1881	Aug 30, 1910
Alder	Saguache	81155	Nov 11, 1911	Nov 30, 1927
Alder Creek	San Miguel		Dec 31, 1878	Sep 06, 1880
Alexander	Lake		Aug 01, 1879	Oct 02, 1879
Alexander (Note: The Oxford, Colorado, post office was renamed Fowler on September 6, 1890, and was then renamed Alexander on March 20, 1900, but was then changed back to Fowler 11 days later.)	Otero	81039	Mar 20, 1900	Mar 31, 1900
Alfalfa	Larimer		Feb 19, 1892	Oct 29, 1892
Alfalfa	Las Animas		Apr 19, 1881	Sep 18, 1882
Alfalfa	Las Animas		Jan 07, 1885	Dec 26, 1889
Alfalfa	Las Animas		Jan 31, 1900	Dec 15, 1923
Alford	Larimer		Jun 28, 1882	Feb 15, 1909
Alicante	Lake		Jun 15, 1881	Apr 22, 1887
Alice	Clear Creek	80452	Aug 20, 1898	Jun 20, 1899
Alice	Clear Creek	80452	Oct 16, 1900	Oct 31, 1925
Alice	Clear Creek	80452	Nov 09, 1936	Dec 31, 1938
Alkalai	Bent		Jun 24, 1874	Jun 14, 1875
Alkali	Dolores		May 06, 1916	rescinded
Allen	Gunnison		Aug 01, 1881	Mar 11, 1892
Allenspark	Boulder	80510	Aug 18, 1896	Nov 30, 1905
Allenspark	Boulder	80510	May 05, 1906	open
Allison	La Plata	81137	Aug 22, 1904	Nov 30, 1954
Alma (Note: Located at an elevation of 10,361 feet (3,158 m), the Alma, Colorado, post office has been the highest elevation U.S. post office since January 4, 1974.)	Park	80420	Mar 07, 1873	open
Almont	Gunnison	81210	Mar 06, 1882	May 03, 1893
Almont	Gunnison	81210	Apr 21, 1904	Oct 31, 1908
Almont	Gunnison	81210	Apr 28, 1910	Jan 31, 1913
Almont	Gunnison	81210	Jul 21, 1913	open
Alnwick	Teller		May 11, 1887	Oct 26, 1893
Alpine	Chaffee		Oct 26, 1874	Jun 30, 1904
Altman	Teller		Jan 18, 1894	Feb 20, 1895
Altman	Teller		Mar 21, 1895	May 20, 1911
Altona	Boulder	80302	Oct 02, 1879	Jul 15, 1916
Alva (Note: The Alva, Colorado, post office was renamed Idalia, on September 18, 1888.)	Yuma	80735	Aug 06, 1887	Sep 18, 1888
Alvin	Yuma	80758	Sep 12, 1910	Feb 28, 1929
American Ranch	Logan		Feb 09, 1863	Dec 12, 1864
American Ranch	Logan		May 01, 1865	Nov 25, 1867
Ames	San Miguel	81426	Dec 20, 1880	May 15, 1881
Ames	San Miguel	81426	Oct 24, 1881	Aug 06, 1900
Ames	San Miguel	81426	Oct 06, 1900	Jun 03, 1922
Amethyst (Note: The Willow, Colorado, post office opened on May 12, 1891, but was renamed Creede on July 1, 1891. The nearby Amethyst, Colorado, post office opened on January 25, 1892. The Creede, Colorado, post office moved to North Creede on November 28, 1908, where it remained open until April 15, 1919. The Amethyst, Colorado, post office closed on February 2, 1909, but reopened as the new Creede, Colorado, post office on February 9, 1909.)	Mineral		Jan 25, 1892	Feb 02, 1909
Amherst	Phillips	80721	Feb 18, 1888	Aug 18, 1899
Amherst	Phillips	80721	Apr 18, 1907	open
Amity	Prowers		Jul 18, 1898	Feb 27, 1937
Amo	El Paso		Apr 14, 1899	Jul 30, 1904
Amo	El Paso		Apr 28, 1905	Jul 31, 1916
Amy	Lincoln		Feb 02, 1909	Mar 31, 1937
Anaconda	Teller		Dec 07, 1893	Mar 31, 1909
Anaconda	Teller		Feb 15, 1911	Nov 15, 1917
Andersonville	Pueblo		Dec 01, 1868	Aug 19, 1869
Andrix	Las Animas	81049	Feb 16, 1920	Dec 02, 1952
Angora	Otero		Jun 18, 1891	Jul 07, 1894
Angora	Rio Blanco	81648	Oct 24, 1896	Sep 30, 1912
Animas (Note: The Animas City, Colorado, post office closed on August 19, 1885, but reopened as Animas on July 10, 1886.)	La Plata	81301	Jul 10, 1886	Sep 29, 1900
Animas City	La Plata	81301	May 24, 1877	Aug 19, 1885
Animas Forks (Note: Located at an elevation of 11,185 feet (3,409 m), the Animas Forks, Colorado Territory, post office was the highest elevation U.S. post office from its opening on February 8, 1875, until February 10, 1876, and again from September 24 to October 16, 1879. Colorado joined the Union on August 1, 1876.)	San Juan		Feb 08, 1875	Feb 26, 1889
Animas Forks	San Juan		Oct 21, 1889	Nov 14, 1891
Animas Forks	San Juan		Jul 25, 1904	Nov 30, 1915
Anita	Fremont		Jun 30, 1892	Jun 10, 1894
Antelope Springs	Mineral		May 05, 1876	May 30, 1903
Antelope Springs	Morgan		Mar 27, 1911	Aug 15, 1917
Antero	Chaffee		Oct 05, 1895	Apr 03, 1896
Anthracite	Gunnison		Nov 14, 1884	Dec 30, 1896
Anthracite	Routt		Feb 11, 1905	Jul 17, 1906
Antlers	Garfield	81650	Jul 01, 1891	May 31, 1906
Antlers	Garfield	81650	Feb 26, 1908	Apr 30, 1954
Anton	Washington	80801	Jul 18, 1916	Oct 15, 1928
Anton	Washington	80801	Jun 30, 1934	open
Antonito (Note: The San Antonio, Colorado, post office was moved to Antonito on January 24, 1881.)	Conejos	81120	Jan 24, 1881	open
Apache (1878)	Huerfano		May 31, 1878	Nov 10, 1882
Apache (1894)	Huerfano		Sep 10, 1894	May 06, 1898
Apache (1894)	Huerfano		Jun 21, 1898	Feb 28, 1923
Apache (1894)	Huerfano		Apr 28, 1923	Aug 31, 1925
Apex	Gilpin		Nov 12, 1894	Apr 30, 1932
Apishapa (Note: The Apishapa, Colorado Territory, post office closed on May 24, 1875. A new post office opened at nearby San Antonia on July 21, 1875, but it was moved and renamed Apishapa on August 7, 1876. The Apishapa post office was renamed Augusta on September 27, 1911.)	Las Animas		Aug 26, 1867	Jul 23, 1868
Apishapa	Las Animas		Nov 11, 1872	May 24, 1875
Apishapa	Las Animas		Aug 07, 1876	Feb 10, 1882
Apishapa	Las Animas		Mar 21, 1882	Mar 18, 1896
Apishapa	Las Animas		Apr 01, 1896	Nov 30, 1909
Apishapa	Las Animas		Aug 01, 1910	Sep 27, 1911
Arapahoe	Cheyenne	80802	May 05, 1906	open
Arapahoe (Note: Arapahoe City served as the first seat of Jefferson County, Jefferson Territory, from November 28, 1859, to November 6, 1860. The Arapahoe, Kansas Territory, post office opened on January 17, 1860, and became the Arapahoe, Colorado Territory, post office on February 28, 1861, before closing on October 12 of that year.)	Jefferson	80403	Jan 17, 1860	Oct 12, 1861
Arastra (Note: In operation from June 15, 1895, until March 31, 1919, the Arastra, Colorado, post office was the highest elevation U.S. post office ever at an elevation of 12,230 feet (3,728 m).)	San Juan	81235	Jun 15, 1895	Mar 31, 1919
Arboles	Archuleta	81121	Dec 13, 1882	Apr 04, 1899
Arboles	Archuleta	81121	Apr 13, 1899	open
Arbourville (Note: The Arbourville, Colorado, post office was renamed Conrow on August 15, 1881.)	Chaffee		Sep 12, 1879	Aug 15, 1881
Archers	Jefferson		Sep 10, 1888	Jul 25, 1893
Arden	Kiowa		Jun 22, 1888	Nov 05, 1888
Arena	Cheyenne		May 02, 1910	Apr 30, 1923
Arequa	Teller		Jul 09, 1894	Sep 01, 1894
Argenta (Note: The Argenta, Colorado, post office was renamed Tomichi on August 23, 1880.)	Gunnison		Jul 02, 1880	Aug 23, 1880
Argentine (1881) (Note: The first Conger, Colorado, post office was renamed Argentine on January 3, 1881.)	Summit		Jan 31, 1881	Oct 22, 1883
Argentine (1901) (Note: The Decatur, Colorado, post office closed on January 28, 1885, but reopened as Rathbone on September 19, 1891. The Rathbone post office closed on July 1, 1895, but reopened as the second Argentine post office on November 18, 1901.)	Summit		Nov 18, 1901	Feb 28, 1907
Argo (Note: On December 1, 1902, the newly created City and County of Denver annexed the towns of Argo, Berkeley, Elyria, Globeville, Montclair, and Valverde.)	Denver		Apr 11, 1881	Mar 21, 1890
Argo	Denver		Jun 11, 1890	Jan 15, 1904
Argo	Denver		May 18, 1904	Sep 15, 1911
Arickaree	Washington	80801	Jun 09, 1888	Oct 31, 1898
Arickaree	Washington	80801	Mar 23, 1900	Jun 23, 1961
Arkansas (Note: The Arkansas, Colorado, post office was renamed Salida on March 28, 1881.)	Chaffee	81201	Jun 16, 1880	Mar 28, 1881
Arkansas Junction	Lake		May 02, 1890	Sep 30, 1910
Arkansas Junction	Lake		Aug 23, 1912	Aug 10, 1918
Arkins	Larimer		Feb 26, 1887	Mar 31, 1906
Arland	Pueblo		Jan 07, 1895	Jul 15, 1895
Arlene	Pueblo		Oct 30, 1916	Aug 31, 1918
Arlington	Kiowa	81021	Aug 16, 1887	Oct 15, 2011
Arlington (Note: The Jones, Colorado, post office was renamed Arlington on May 25, 1883.)	Mesa		May 25, 1883	Aug 12, 1884
Arloa	Montezuma		Mar 12, 1903	Apr 15, 1914
Armel	Yuma	80758	Oct 17, 1903	May 31, 1958
Armour	Pueblo		May 06, 1886	Feb 03, 1892
Armstrong	Logan		Oct 30, 1911	Jun 15, 1917
Arnold (Note: The Willard, Colorado, post office closed on April 19, 1894, but reopened as Arnold on January 26, 1897, only to be renamed Willard on March 30, 1900.)	Logan	80741	Jan 26, 1897	Mar 30, 1900
Arnold	Yuma		Nov 17, 1913	Sep 15, 1914
Aroya	Cheyenne	80862	Sep 17, 1889	Mar 26, 1965
Arriba	Lincoln	80804	Feb 04, 1889	open
Arriola	Montezuma	81321	Dec 18, 1894	Jun 15, 1904
Arriola	Montezuma	81321	Jun 20, 1908	Aug 15, 1933
Arrow	Grand		Mar 21, 1905	Mar 15, 1915
Arroya	Lincoln		Jan 16, 1877	Feb 11, 1878
Arroya	Lincoln		May 07, 1879	Jan 17, 1881
Artesia (Note: The Town of Dinosaur, Colorado, was originally incorporated on December 18, 1947, as the Town of Artesia. The Artesia, Colorado, post office was renamed Dinosaur on January 1, 1966.)	Moffat	81610	Mar 20, 1946	Jan 01, 1966
Artman	Pueblo		Aug 31, 1892	Feb 14, 1901
Arvada	Jefferson; Adams	80001-80007; 80403	Feb 16, 1871	open
Ash	Ouray		Oct 11, 1899	Dec 31, 1905
Ashcroft	Pitkin		Aug 12, 1880	Aug 05, 1881
Ashcroft	Pitkin		Jan 03, 1882	Nov 30, 1912
Ashland	Kit Carson		Jan 14, 1890	May 15, 1909
Aspen	Pitkin	81611-81612	Jun 07, 1880	open
Aspen Junction (Note: The Aspen Junction, Colorado, post office was renamed Basalt on June 19, 1895.)	Eagle	81621	Feb 13, 1890	Jun 19, 1895
Aspen-Gerbaz	Pitkin		Dec 04, 1967	Feb 19, 1981
Association Camp	Larimer	80511	May 29, 1916	Apr 30, 1966
Atchee	Garfield		Sep 26, 1905	Jan 02, 1907
Atchee	Garfield		Sep 27, 1910	Jul 15, 1920
Atchee	Garfield		Sep 27, 1920	Apr 30, 1940
Athens	Denver		Jul 20, 1892	May 13, 1896
Atlanta	Baca		Dec 13, 1887	Aug 31, 1899
Atwell	Las Animas		Jan 29, 1915	Aug 31, 1920
Atwood	Logan	80722	Aug 10, 1885	open
Augusta	Custer		May 05, 1890	Apr 15, 1902
Augusta	Las Animas		Sep 27, 1911	May 15, 1928
Ault (Note: The Town of Ault, Colorado, was originally incorporated on April 11, 1904, as the Town of Bergdorf.)	Weld	80610	Mar 29, 1898	open
Auraria (Note: On January 18, 1859, the United States Post Office Department authorized the first three post offices in the Pike's Peak gold region: Auraria, Kansas Territory; Montana, Kansas Territory; and St. Vrain, Nebraska Territory.) (Note: The Auraria, Kansas Territory, post office opened on January 18, 1859. Later that year on August 24, the voters of the Pike's Peak mining region approved the formation of the Provisional Government of the Territory of Jefferson and designated rival Denver City as the territorial capital. Still later that year on November 28, the Jefferson Territory designated Denver City as the seat of Arapahoe County, and five days later, granted a charter to the consolidated City of Denver, Auraria, and Highland. The Auraria post office was renamed Denver City on February 11, 1860.)	Denver	80204	Jan 18, 1859	Feb 11, 1860
Aurora (Note: The City of Aurora, Colorado, was originally incorporated on May 5, 1903, as the Town of Fletcher.)	Adams; Arapahoe; Douglas	80010-80019; 80040-80047; 80247	Jan 15, 1908	Dec 31, 1939
Aurora	Adams; Arapahoe; Douglas	80010-80019; 80040-80047; 80247	Apr 28, 1962	open
Aurora	Ouray		May 10, 1880	Feb 19, 1884
Auroria (Note: The Auroria, Nebraska Territory, post office moved to Colona on April 27, 1860. The Colona Post Office closed on February 11, 1861, but reopened on July 15, 1862, as La Porte. The La Porte post office closed on December 12, 1864, but reopened on October 5, 1866. La Porte served as the seat of Heele County, Jefferson Territory, from November 28, 1859, until June 6, 1861, and then served as the original seat of Larimer County, Colorado Territory, from November 1, 1861, until 1868. The name of the La Porte post office was changed to Laporte on December 21, 1894.)	Larimer	80535	Dec 11, 1858	Apr 27, 1860
Austin	Delta	81410	May 19, 1905	open
Austin	Garfield		Jul 21, 1890	Jun 06, 1896
Avalo	Weld	80754	Jul 01, 1898	May 30, 1936
Avendale	Kit Carson		Feb 05, 1889	Sep 12, 1890
Avoca	Yuma		Jun 10, 1889	Oct 27, 1891
Avon	Eagle	81620	Nov 26, 1900	open
Avondale	Pueblo	81022	Mar 22, 1892	open
Axial	Moffat		Mar 06, 1883	Apr 09, 1886
Axial	Moffat		Nov 09, 1886	Apr 03, 1888
Axial	Moffat		Mar 04, 1890	Apr 30, 1958
Ayer	Otero		Oct 18, 1911	Aug 31, 1941
Aylmer (Note: The Aylmer, Colorado, post office was renamed Bowen on September 18, 1906.)	Las Animas		Dec 14, 1899	Feb 02, 1900
Aylmer	Las Animas		Mar 23, 1900	Sep 18, 1906
Ayr	Prowers		Jul 25, 1888	Sep 04, 1893

== B ==
Select the OpenStreetMap link at the right to view the location of some of the post offices in this section.

Post office	Current county	ZIP Code	Date opened	Date closed
Badger	Washington		Jan 01, 1890	Sep 04, 1893
Badger	Washington		Apr 20, 1894	Jul 20, 1894
Badito (Note: The Little Orphan, Colorado Territory, post office was renamed Badito on September 12, 1865.)	Huerfano	81089	Sep 12, 1865	Nov 15, 1910
Bailey	Park	80421	Nov 20, 1878	open
Baker	Baca		Feb 27, 1915	Jun 30, 1921
Balarat	Boulder	80540	Sep 12, 1879	Oct 20, 1881
Balarat	Boulder	80540	Jan 31, 1887	May 13, 1887
Bald Mountain (Note: The Nevada, Colorado Territory, post office was renamed Bald Mountain on December 16, 1869. The town was also known as Nevada City and Nevadaville.)	Gilpin	80427	Dec 16, 1869	Oct 15, 1921
Baldwin (1883)	Gunnison	81230	Sep 17, 1883	Mar 31, 1902
Baldwin (1909)	Gunnison	81230	Jun 26, 1909	Sep 30, 1948
Balfour	Park	80449	Feb 06, 1894	Jan 31, 1907
Baltimore	Gilpin		Aug 28, 1896	Dec 12, 1896
Baltimore	Gilpin		Mar 03, 1898	Oct 26, 1904
Baltzer	Kit Carson		Jun 04, 1907	Dec 14, 1907
Balzac	Garfield		May 23, 1891	Mar 31, 1903
Barbee	Routt		Jan 13, 1906	Aug 14, 1909
Bardeen	El Paso		Mar 07, 1917	May 31, 1924
Bardine	Gunnison		Mar 11, 1903	Oct 15, 1908
Barehills	Fremont		Apr 28, 1896	Jun 29, 1901
Barela (Note: The Glenham, Colorado Territory, post office was renamed Barela on July 28, 1874.)	Las Animas	81081	Jul 28, 1874	May 21, 1886
Barela	Las Animas	81081	Mar 19, 1887	Oct 19, 1896
Barela	Las Animas	81081	Apr 09, 1902	Sep 30, 1931
Barlow (Note: Barlow, Colorado, was previously known as Defiance. The Barlow post office was renamed Glenwood Springs on March 28, 1884.)	Garfield	81601	Jun 25, 1883	Mar 28, 1884
Barnes	Montrose		Nov 15, 1901	Apr 15, 1903
Barnesville	Weld	80624	Jun 09, 1910	Sep 14, 1935
Barnum (Note: The City of Denver annexed the Town of Barnum on September 3, 1896.)	Denver	80219	Feb 05, 1892	Jun 30, 1901
Barnum	Gunnison		Mar 10, 1876	Jun 07, 1881
Barr (Note: The Barr, Colorado, post office was renamed Barr Lake on October 17, 1914.)	Adams	80603	Mar 15, 1883	Oct 17, 1914
Barr Lake	Adams	80603	Oct 17, 1914	Aug 31, 1952
Barry	Teller		Mar 01, 1892	Dec 07, 1893
Bartlett	Baca	81090	Sep 05, 1928	Mar 31, 1938
Barton (Note: The Zuck, Colorado, post office was renamed Barton on March 20, 1895.)	Prowers		Mar 29, 1895	Oct 15, 1917
Basalt	Eagle; Pitkin	81621	Jun 19, 1895	open
Bashor	Adams		Mar 05, 1909	Jul 31, 1918
Bassetts Mill	El Paso		Jun 15, 1869	Jan 04, 1872
Bassetts Mill	El Paso		Mar 26, 1872	Sep 13, 1872
Bassick (Note: The Querida, Colorado, post office closed on May 14, 1906, but reopened as Bassick on May 19, 1917.)	Custer		May 19, 1917	Dec 31, 1920
Bath	Park		Jul 25, 1893	Feb 20, 1894
Bath	Park		Nov 15, 1901	Sep 09, 1903
Bath	Park		Apr 18, 1904	Jul 28, 1904
Battle Creek	Routt		Mar 03, 1911	Feb 03, 1938
Battlement Mesa	Garfield	81636	NA	open
Bayfield (Note: The Los Pinos, Colorado, post office was renamed Bayfield on February 25, 1899.)	La Plata	81122	Feb 25, 1899	open
Beacon	Las Animas		Aug 11, 1910	Nov 15, 1913
Bear Cañon	Douglas		Apr 07, 1863	Aug 29, 1867
Bear Canyon	Douglas		Apr 08, 1869	Aug 04, 1879
Bear River	Routt		Nov 10, 1914	Sep 20, 1940
Bearcreek	Montezuma		Mar 11, 1899	Mar 31, 1900
Bearcreek	Montezuma		Apr 13, 1907	Dec 14, 1918
Beaty	Dolores		Aug 20, 1902	Jan 02, 1903
Beaver (Note: The Toof, Colorado, post office was renamed Beaver Creek on January 8, 1883, and was then shortened to Beaver on April 11, 1902.)	Fremont		Apr 11, 1902	Apr 30, 1910
Beaver Brook	Jefferson		Apr 19, 1875	Apr 28, 1886
Beaver Brook	Jefferson		Feb 18, 1889	May 31, 1892
Beaver Creek	Arapahoe		Feb 09, 1915	Feb 15, 1916
Beaver Creek (1862)	Fremont		Oct 03, 1862	Jan 06, 1874
Beaver Creek (1883)	Fremont		Jan 08, 1883	Apr 11, 1902
Beaverton	Kit Carson		Oct 17, 1910	Nov 30, 1915
Bedrock	Montrose	81411	Nov 08, 1883	Sep 15, 1903
Bedrock	Montrose	81411	Oct 12, 1911	open
Bee (Note: The Bee, Colorado, post office was renamed Sheridan Lake on October 27, 1887.)	Kiowa		Aug 16, 1887	Sep 20, 1887
Bee	Kiowa		Oct 15, 1887	Oct 27, 1887
Beecher (Note: The Beecher, Colorado, post office closed on November 3, 1905, but reopened as Glory on November 13, 1924, and was then renamed Beecher Island on February 1, 1925.)	Yuma		Aug 12, 1902	Feb 28, 1905
Beecher	Yuma		Aug 31, 1905	Nov 03, 1905
Beecher Island	Yuma		Feb 01, 1925	May 31, 1958
Belford	Clear Creek		Mar 07, 1884	Aug 11, 1884
Belford	Hinsdale		Dec 10, 1879	Nov 21, 1881
Belle Monte	Boulder		Jan 03, 1866	Aug 31, 1866
Bellevue	Jefferson	80470	Mar 07, 1881	Jul 27, 1881
Bellvue	Larimer	80512	Jun 24, 1884	open
Beloit	Kit Carson		Mar 27, 1888	Sep 29, 1893
Benko	Elbert		Sep 18, 1915	Mar 31, 1917
Bennet (Note: The spelling of the Bennet, Colorado, post office was changed to Bennett on June 1, 1907.)	Adams; Arapahoe	80102	Mar 16, 1877	Jun 01, 1907
Bennet Springs	Douglas		Dec 20, 1862	Sep 12, 1865
Bennett	Adams; Arapahoe	80102	Jun 01, 1907	open
Bent Canyon	Las Animas		Mar 28, 1872	Jun 30, 1902
Bent's Fort	Bent	81052	Jun 04, 1863	Dec 02, 1873
Berkeley	Denver		Oct 24, 1890	May 18, 1896
Bernard	Mesa		Jan 27, 1896	May 31, 1905
Bernice	Costilla		Feb 26, 1901	May 16, 1902
Berry	Kit Carson		Apr 13, 1911	Apr 15, 1912
Berthoud (Note: The Little Thompson, Colorado, post office was renamed Berthoud on April 4, 1878.)	Larimer; Weld	80513	Apr 04, 1878	open
Berwind	Las Animas		Mar 10, 1892	May 30, 1931
Beshoar	Las Animas		Jan 25, 1901	Jun 30, 1903
Bethesda	Douglas		Mar 28, 1902	Sep 15, 1909
Bethune	Kit Carson	80805	Jan 19, 1889	May 15, 1905
Bethune	Kit Carson	80805	Sep 17, 1906	open
Beuck (Note: The Godfrey, Colorado, post office was renamed Buick on April 11, 1916, and was then renamed Beuck on March 23, 1918.)	Elbert		Mar 23, 1918	May 01, 1918
Beulah (Note: The Mace's Hole, Colorado, post office was renamed Beulah on October 25, 1876.)	Pueblo	81023	Oct 25, 1876	open
Biedell	Saguache		Jun 25, 1883	Apr 28, 1884
Big Elk	Boulder		Jun 03, 1915	Sep 15, 1917
Big Sandy	El Paso		Dec 13, 1876	Nov 06, 1877
Big Sandy	El Paso		Jan 17, 1882	Nov 24, 1888
Big Thompson	Larimer		Nov 12, 1862	Jan 10, 1878
Bighorn	Jackson		Mar 03, 1898	Feb 15, 1900
Bijou Basin	El Paso		Apr 08, 1869	Jul 03, 1882
Bijou Basin	El Paso		Aug 02, 1882	Aug 26, 1882
Bijou Basin	El Paso		Jan 28, 1885	Mar 30, 1907
Bijou View (Note: The spelling of the Bijouview, Colorado, post office was changed to Bijou View on June 10, 1921.)	Morgan		Jun 10, 1921	Nov 16, 1925
Bijouview	Morgan		Apr 03, 1914	Jun 10, 1921
Bird	Adams		Aug 04, 1880	NA
Bird	Adams		Oct 04, 1880	Nov 22, 1880
Birmingham	Huerfano		Aug 25, 1883	Sep 19, 1894
Bismark	Saguache		Feb 07, 1872	Oct 10, 1879
Bison	Routt		Feb 18, 1898	rescinded
Bittner	Gunnison		Sep 07, 1905	rescinded
Black Forest	El Paso	80908, 80106	Apr 16, 1960	Feb 09, 1966
Black Hawk (Note: The name of the Black Hawk Point, Colorado Territory, post office was shortened to Black Hawk on February 8, 1871, was then respelled Blackhawk on January 30, 1895, but was then changed back to Black Hawk on July 1, 1950.)	Gilpin	80422	Feb 08, 1871	Jan 30, 1895
Black Hawk	Gilpin	80422	Jul 01, 1950	open
Black Hawk Point	Gilpin	80422	Dec 06, 1862	Feb 08, 1871
Black Mountain (Note: The Devine, Colorado, post office was renamed Black Mountain on June 20, 1899.)	Park		Jun 20, 1899	Oct 14, 1911
Black Wolf	Yuma		May 09, 1885	Oct 30, 1885
Blackburn	Custer		Aug 01, 1881	May 11, 1889
Blackhawk	Gilpin	80422	Jan 30, 1895	Jul 01, 1950
Blackwell	Prowers		Jul 07, 1881	Oct 31, 1881
Blackwell	Prowers		Jan 05, 1882	Dec 31, 1883
Blackwell	Prowers		Mar 24, 1884	May 11, 1886
Blaine	Baca		Aug 04, 1900	Sep 15, 1939
Blaine	Eagle		Jul 07, 1884	Feb 01, 1886
Blainvale	Rio Grande		Jun 20, 1882	Aug 31, 1882
Blainvale	Rio Grande		Feb 04, 1884	Sep 10, 1884
Blanca	Costilla	81123	Oct 05, 1894	Jul 31, 1895
Blanca	Costilla	81123	Apr 17, 1898	Aug 31, 1900
Blanca	Costilla	81123	Dec 28, 1900	Feb 15, 1902
Blanca	Costilla	81123	Oct 28, 1908	open
Bland	Elbert		May 02, 1883	Feb 15, 1921
Bloom	Otero		Apr 18, 1899	Dec 11, 1899
Bloom	Otero		Apr 19, 1913	May 31, 1938
Blue Mountain	Moffat	81610	Sep 01, 1949	Jan 31, 1957
Blue River	Summit	80424		
Blumenau (Note: The Colfax, Colorado, post office was renamed Blumenau on January 16, 1879.)	Custer		Jan 16, 1879	Jul 16, 1879
Blumenau	Custer		Aug 08, 1879	Oct 09, 1890
Boaz	Teller		Mar 07, 1895	Oct 31, 1898
Boiler	Larimer		Sep 03, 1914	Sep 15, 1915
Bolton	Yuma		May 01, 1900	Sep 09, 1901
Bonanza (Note: The Town of Bonanza, Colorado, was originally incorporated on January 13, 1881, as the Town of Bonanza City.)	Saguache	81155	Aug 12, 1880	Apr 27, 1895
Bonanza	Saguache	81155	May 24, 1895	May 14, 1938
Boncarbo	Las Animas	81024	Nov 15, 1917	Aug 12, 2017
Boncarbo	Las Animas	81024	NA	open
Bond	Eagle	80423	Dec 04, 1935	open
Bond	Lake		Jul 16, 1886	Oct 25, 1888
Bonito	Saguache		Mar 07, 1881	Aug 28, 1883
Bonny	Kit Carson		Jun 03, 1915	Feb 29, 1924
Boone (Note: The name of the Booneville, Colorado, post office was shortened to Boone on December 5, 1891.)	Pueblo	81025	Dec 05, 1891	open
Booneville	Pueblo	81025	Jan 02, 1863	Dec 05, 1891
Bordenville	Park	80456	Sep 29, 1879	Nov 28, 1884
Boreas	Summit		Jan 02, 1896	Jan 31, 1905
Boston	Baca		Apr 14, 1887	Jun 16, 1893
Boulder (Note: In continuous operation for 166 years, the Boulder post office is the oldest in Colorado.) (Note: The City of Boulder, Colorado, was originally incorporated by the Territory of Colorado on November 4, 1871, as the City of Boulder City.)	Boulder	80302, 80301; 80303-80314	Apr 22, 1859	open
Bovina	Lincoln		Jan 08, 1889	Nov 30, 1955
Bow Mar	Arapahoe; Jefferson	80123		
Bowen	Las Animas		Sep 18, 1906	Jan 15, 1929
Bowen	Rio Grande		May 02, 1883	Sep 30, 1901
Bowenton	Mineral		Aug 10, 1881	Aug 21, 1884
Bowerman (Note: The Nugget, Colorado, post office was renamed Bowerman on October 28, 1903.)	Gunnison		Oct 28, 1903	May 27, 1910
Bowie	Delta	81412	Feb 05, 1907	Jul 14, 1967
Bowman	Gunnison		Jun 07, 1880	Apr 28, 1882
Bowser	Kit Carson		Jun 09, 1888	Oct 12, 1888
Box Elder (1876) (Note: The first Box Elder, Colorado, post office was renamed Bristol on December 26, 1877.)	Larimer		Jun 02, 1876	Dec 26, 1877
Box Elder (1884) (Note: The spelling of the second Box Elder, Colorado, post office was changed to Boxelder on October 30, 1894.)	Larimer		Apr 29, 1884	Oct 30, 1894
Boxelder	Larimer		Oct 30, 1894	Jun 15, 1923
Boxelder	Larimer		May 16, 1924	Nov 19, 1924
Boyero	Lincoln	80806	Mar 03, 1902	Jul 20, 1973
Braddock	Summit		Jan 18, 1884	Dec 27, 1890
Bradford (Note: The Dickson, Colorado, post office closed on January 7, 1885, but reopened as Bradford on November 27, 1889.)	Huerfano		Nov 27, 1889	Aug 21, 1895
Brandon	Kiowa	81071	May 19, 1888	May 03, 1893
Brandon	Kiowa	81071	May 28, 1908	Feb 28, 1963
Branson (Note: The Coloflats, Colorado, post office was renamed Branson on July 30, 1918.)	Las Animas	81027	Jul 30, 1918	open
Brazil	Las Animas		May 14, 1895	Aug 31, 1899
Brazil	Las Animas		Feb 20, 1911	May 31, 1912
Breckenridge (Note: Breckenridge was founded in 1859 and named for prospector Thomas Breckenridge. In 1860, the town changed the spelling of its name to Breckinridge in honor of U.S. Vice President John Cabell Breckinridge. On December 2, 1861, thirty days after John Breckinridge accepted a commission as a brigadier general in the Confederate States Army, the loyal Union town changed its name back to the original Breckenridge.)	Summit	80424	Dec 02, 1861	open
Breckinridge (Note: Located at an elevation of 9,728 feet (2,965 m), the Breckinridge, Utah Territory, post office was the highest elevation U.S. post office from its opening on January 18, 1860, until February 16, 1861.)	Summit	80424	Jan 18, 1860	Dec 02, 1861
Breen	La Plata	81326	Jul 19, 1901	Nov 30, 1954
Brewster	Fremont		Oct 09, 1899	Dec 15, 1900
Brewster	Fremont		Apr 21, 1914	Sep 30, 1916
Briggsdale	Weld	80611	Aug 01, 1910	open
Brighton (Note: The Hughes, Colorado, post office was renamed Brighton on August 4, 1879.)	Adams; Weld	80601-80603; 80640	Aug 04, 1879	open
Brightside	Jefferson		Nov 13, 1900	Dec 31, 1901
Brightside	Jefferson		Feb 04, 1902	Nov 29, 1902
Bristol	Larimer		Dec 26, 1877	Dec 02, 1890
Bristol	Prowers	81047	Jul 01, 1908	Nov 02, 1997
Brodhead	Las Animas		Aug 14, 1902	Apr 15, 1913
Brodhead	Las Animas		Jul 19, 1915	Apr 29, 1939
Bronquist	Pueblo	81005	Aug 30, 1917	Jun 30, 1925
Brook Forest	Jefferson; Clear Creek	80439	Oct 11, 1921	Feb 15, 1949
Brookfield	Baca		Aug 30, 1887	Jul 15, 1902
Brookside	Fremont	81212	May 21, 1888	Mar 15, 1909
Brookston	Routt		Mar 25, 1914	Apr 15, 1930
Brookvale	Clear Creek	80439	Jul 24, 1876	Jan 03, 1883
Brookvale	Clear Creek	80439	Mar 22, 1883	Sep 16, 1885
Brookvale	Clear Creek	80439	Jun 14, 1889	Apr 30, 1942
Broomfield (Note: The City and County of Broomfield, Colorado, was consolidated on November 15, 2001.)	Broomfield	80020-80023; 80038	Sep 26, 1884	open
Brown (Note: The Brown, Colorado, post office was renamed Olathe on June 04, 1896.)	Montrose	81425	Apr 02, 1883	Oct 01, 1891
Brown	Montrose	81425	Jun 02, 1892	Jun 04, 1896
Brown Cañon (Note: The Kraft, Colorado, post office was renamed Brown's Cañon on May 8, 1888. The Brown's Cañon post office closed on July 25, 1893, but reopened as the Brown Cañon post office on March 9, 1904.)	Chaffee	81212	Mar 09, 1904	Jun 30, 1908
Brown's Cañon	Chaffee	81212	May 08, 1888	Jul 25, 1893
Brownsville	Clear Creek		Apr 07, 1871	Dec 01, 1875
Brownville	Jefferson		Jan 03, 1879	Oct 05, 1883
Broyles	Conejos		Sep 29, 1905	Oct 31, 1908
Brunker	Washington		Dec 28, 1907	Jan 31, 1917
Brush	Morgan	80723	Sep 19, 1882	open
Bryant	Yuma		Mar 27, 1888	Mar 31, 1916
Buckhorn	Larimer		Aug 02, 1878	Aug 18, 1888
Buckingham	Weld	80725	Dec 21, 1888	Jan 08, 1890
Buckingham	Weld	80725	Apr 08, 1910	Jul 01, 1966
Buckley (Note: The Buckley, Colorado, post office was renamed Lycan on June 27, 1913.)	Baca		NA	Jun 27, 1913
Buckskin (Note: Located at an elevation of 10,761 feet (3,280 m), the Laurette, Colorado Territory, post office was the highest elevation U.S. post office from its opening on Nov 14, 1861 until its closing on January 24, 1873. The Laurette post office was renamed Buckskin on December 21, 1865.)	Park		Dec 21, 1865	Jan 24, 1873
Buckskin Joe	Fremont	81212	Jun 01, 1961	Mar 31, 1966
Buena Vista	Chaffee	81211	Sep 18, 1879	open
Buffalo (Note: The Buffalo, Colorado, post office was renamed Merino on February 21, 1883.)	Logan	80741	Jun 24, 1874	Feb 21, 1883
Buffalo Creek	Jefferson	80425	Aug 16, 1878	Sep 13, 1963
Buffalo Creek	Jefferson	80425	NA	open
Buffalo Springs	Park		May 28, 1875	May 15, 1912
Buffer	Summit		Dec 05, 1917	Oct 15, 1921
Buford	Rio Blanco	81641	Mar 19, 1890	Jun 30, 1919
Buford	Rio Blanco	81641	Dec 06, 1921	Dec 15, 1961
Buick	Elbert		Sep 19, 1916	Mar 23, 1918
Buick	Elbert		May 01, 1918	Aug 15, 1925
Bulger	Larimer	80549	Oct 04, 1909	Jul 31, 1912
Bulkley	San Miguel		Mar 07, 1895	Mar 29, 1895
Bunce	Boulder		Oct 12, 1895	May 31, 1901
Bunell (Note: The Bunell, Colorado, post office was renamed Fitzsimons on November 2, 1921.)	Adams	80045	Feb 14, 1919	Nov 02, 1921
Burdett	Washington		Apr 04, 1888	Apr 30, 1937
Burlington	Boulder		Nov 06, 1862	Apr 14, 1873
Burlington	Kit Carson	80807	Apr 29, 1887	open
Burns	Eagle	80426	May 14, 1895	open
Burnt Mill (Note: The Kinkel, Colorado, post office was renamed Burnt Mill on October 7, 1911.)	Pueblo	81023	Oct 07, 1911	Sep 30, 1921
Burrows Park (Note: The Burrows Park, Colorado, post office was renamed White Cross on September 28, 1882.)	Hinsdale		Sep 26, 1876	Sep 28, 1882
Burt	El Paso		Mar 24, 1910	Aug 15, 1916
Bush	Larimer		Oct 11, 1882	Sep 10, 1885
Busk	Lake		Dec 15, 1890	Mar 02, 1894
Buster	Baca		Jul 28, 1916	Jul 30, 1927
Butler	Jackson		Jun 16, 1890	Nov 30, 1911
Butte Valley (1869)	Huerfano		Jul 06, 1869	Feb 26, 1878
Butte Valley (1869)	Huerfano		May 20, 1878	Aug 26, 1878
Butte Valley (1938)	Huerfano		Oct 01, 1938	Sep 06, 1949
Buttes (Note: The El Paso, Colorado, post office closed on July 11, 1893, but reopened as Buttes on January 24, 1895.)	El Paso	80817	Jan 24, 1895	Apr 15, 1922
Byers	Arapahoe	80103	Feb 27, 1873	open

== C ==
Select the OpenStreetMap link at the right to view the location of some of the post offices in this section.

Post office	Current county	ZIP Code	Date opened	Date closed
Cable (Note: The Cable, Colorado, post office was renamed Genoa on January 30, 1895.)	Lincoln		Jul 19, 1893	Jan 30, 1895
Cacharas (Note: The Cacharas, Colorado Territory, post office was renamed Cucharas on September 20, 1872.)	Huerfano		Dec 08, 1870	Sep 20, 1872
Caddoa	Bent		Nov 07, 1881	Jun 09, 1884
Caddoa	Bent		Jun 12, 1884	Mar 07, 1958
Cahone	Dolores	81320	May 21, 1916	Nov 30, 1917
Cahone	Dolores	81320	Jun 12, 1920	open
Caisson	Moffat		Sep 03, 1920	Dec 31, 1937
Calcite	Fremont		Jun 29, 1904	Apr 30, 1930
Calcium (Note: The Calcium, Colorado, post office was renamed Thomasville on March 31, 1890.)	Pitkin		Mar 10, 1888	Mar 31, 1890
Calhan	El Paso	80808	Nov 24, 1888	open
Calumet	Chaffee		Jan 24, 1882	Feb 09, 1885
Calvert (Note: The Calvert, Colorado, post office was renamed Fleming on August 8, 1888.)	Logan	80728	Dec 22, 1887	Aug 08, 1888
Camargo	Custer		Apr 19, 1881	Nov 31, 1881
Cameo	Mesa	81622	Dec 14, 1907	Feb 28, 1969
Cameron	Teller		Apr 10, 1901	Aug 31, 1909
Cameville	Montrose		Nov 07, 1882	Aug 20, 1890
Camfield	Weld		Apr 18, 1910	Feb 15, 1921
Camp Carson (Note: Camp Carson was renamed Fort Carson in 1954.)	El Paso		1942	1954
Camp Genter	Gunnison		Feb 12, 1925	Jan 15, 1930
Camp Shumway	Huerfano		Apr 13, 1911	Jul 01, 1924
Camp Speer	Adams	80045	Dec 05, 1918	Feb 14, 1919
Campbird	Ouray	81427	Apr 28, 1898	Mar 15, 1919
Campo	Baca	81029	Apr 10, 1913	open
Canadian	Jackson		Mar 06, 1883	Jul 03, 1891
Canfield	Boulder	80026	Mar 28, 1878	Jun 15, 1906
Cañon City (Note: The spelling of the Cañon City, Colorado, post office was changed to Canyon City on July 30, 1904, but was then changed back to Cañon City on December 15, 1904.)	Fremont	81212, 80215	Dec 13, 1860	Jul 30, 1904
Cañon City	Fremont	81212, 80215	Dec 15, 1904	open
Canyon City	Fremont	81212, 80216	Jul 30, 1904	Dec 15, 1904
Capitol City	Hinsdale		May 18, 1877	Oct 30, 1920
Capps (Note: The Scissors, Colorado, post office was renamed Capps on September 26, 1894.)	Huerfano		Sep 26, 1894	Aug 15, 1901
Capulin	Conejos	81124	Aug 10, 1881	Jul 14, 1922
Capulin	Conejos	81124	Sep 21, 1923	open
Carbonate (Note: Carbonate served as the original seat of Garfield County, Colorado for several months after the county was created on February 10, 1883.)	Garfield	81602	Apr 13, 1883	Nov 15, 1886
Carbonateville	Summit		Feb 02, 1879	Jan 27, 1881
Carbondale	Garfield	81623	Jan 06, 1887	Feb 14, 1887
Carbondale	Garfield	81623	May 14, 1887	open
Cardiff	Garfield	81601	Aug 01, 1889	Jul 31, 1918
Cardinal	Boulder		Jul 13, 1905	Oct 15, 1910
Cardinal	Boulder		Sep 27, 1911	Feb 28, 1913
Cardinal	Boulder		Jan 28, 1915	Oct 15, 1919
Carey	Kit Carson		Dec 12, 1910	Dec 30, 1916
Carey	Pitkin		Aug 21, 1883	Jan 07, 1884
Caribou	Boulder	80466	Jan 31, 1871	Mar 31, 1917
Carlisle	Kit Carson		Jul 21, 1887	Jun 09, 1890
Carlton	Prowers	81052	Jan 14, 1891	Mar 05, 1960
Carmel	Chaffee		Jun 15, 1881	Oct 26, 1882
Carnero (1870)	Saguache		Jun 16, 1870	Jul 11, 1876
Carnero (1870)	Saguache		Mar 08, 1880	Mar 18, 1884
Carnero (1884)	Saguache		Apr 28, 1884	Nov 30, 1886
Carnero (1884)	Saguache		Dec 07, 1894	Aug 31, 1911
Carpenter	Mesa		Jun 11, 1890	Aug 03, 1891
Carr	Weld	80612	Mar 26, 1872	Nov 19, 1878
Carr	Weld	80612	Oct 17, 1884	open
Carr Crossing	Lincoln		Mar 25, 1915	Apr 15, 1930
Carracas	Archuleta	81147	Mar 03, 1909	Jan 31, 1911
Carriso (Note: The Carriso, Colorado, post office closed on July 11, 1895, but reopened as Townsite on March 18, 1900. The Townsite post office closed on December 31, 1902, but reopened as Carrizo on September 21, 1907.)	Baca		Jun 02, 1887	Dec 26, 1889
Carriso	Baca		Oct 30, 1890	Mar 03, 1891
Carriso	Baca		Apr 17, 1894	Jul 11, 1895
Carriso Springs	Baca		Aug 27, 1888	May 17, 1890
Carriso	Baca		Sep 21, 1907	Nov 27, 1907
Carriso	Baca		Dec 14, 1907	Jan 31, 1916
Carson (Note: Located at an elevation of 11,574 feet (3,528 m), the Carson, Colorado, post office was the highest elevation U.S. post office from its opening on September 16, 1889, until June 15, 1895.)	Hinsdale		Sep 16, 1889	Oct 15, 1903
Carson	Huerfano		Sep 23, 1868	Oct 23, 1868
Carson	Huerfano		Jun 15, 1869	Dec 07, 1870
Carsonhart	Las Animas		Nov 15, 1917	rescinded
Cary	Arapahoe		Apr 23, 1888	Feb 28, 1890
Cary Ranch	Routt		Mar 25, 1914	Nov 29, 1930
Cascade	El Paso	80809	Aug 16, 1887	open
Cascade	La Plata		Jun 14, 1880	Apr 22, 1881
Cascade	La Plata		May 11, 1881	Jul 24, 1882
Case	Douglas		Aug 07, 1897	Jun 24, 1913
Cash Creek	Chaffee		Aug 02, 1862	Feb 27, 1871
Cashin	Montrose		Sep 14, 1898	Apr 30, 1904
Cashin	Montrose		Jan 04, 1905	Apr 29, 1905
Cassels	Park		Jun 19, 1899	Sep 30, 1929
Castelar	La Plata		May 09, 1905	Jun 30, 1912
Castle (Note: The Castle, Colorado, post office was renamed Eagle on September 3, 1891.)	Eagle		Feb 18, 1885	Sep 03, 1891
Castle Pines (Note: The City of Castle Pines North, Colorado, was incorporated on November 6, 2007, but an election on November 2, 2010, shortened the city's name to the City of Castle Pines.)	Douglas	80108	NA	open
Castle Rock (1871) (Note: The first Castle Rock, Colorado Territory, post office was renamed Douglas on May 18, 1874.)	Douglas		Apr 05, 1871	May 18, 1874
Castle Rock	Douglas	80104, 80108; 80109	May 18, 1874	open
Castleton	Gunnison		Dec 08, 1882	Oct 11, 1894
Cathedral	Hinsdale	81243	Jul 18, 1898	Sep 30, 1921
Catherin	Alamosa		Sep 25, 1888	Oct 18, 1890
Catherin	Garfield	81623	Oct 18, 1892	Feb 15, 1902
Catlin (Note: The Catlin, Colorado, post office was renamed Manzanola on November 4, 1895.)	Otero	81058	Nov 06, 1879	Nov 04, 1895
Cebolla	Gunnison		Mar 20, 1894	Sep 14, 1935
Cedar	San Miguel		Apr 07, 1892	Jan 15, 1921
Cedar	San Miguel		Nov 02, 1923	Nov 15, 1943
Cedar Creek	Montrose	81401	Oct 19, 1904	Jul 31, 1906
Cedar Creek	Montrose	81401	Dec 08, 1910	Oct 31, 1912
Cedar Creek	Montrose	81401	Mar 07, 1917	Jan 15, 1924
Cedaredge	Delta	81413	Dec 05, 1894	open
Cedarhurst	Las Animas		Aug 27, 1903	Mar 31, 1913
Cedarwood	Pueblo	81069	Mar 22, 1912	Mar 15, 1943
Cenicero (Note: The Cenicero, Colorado, post office was renamed Lobatos on March 14, 1902.)	Conejos	81120	Apr 13, 1894	Mar 14, 1902
Centennial	Arapahoe	80015-80016; 80111-80112; 80121-80122; 80161	(Note: The City of Centennial was incorporated on February 7, 2001.)	open
Center (Note: The name of the Centerview, Colorado, post office was shortened to Center on July 1, 1899.)	Rio Grande; Saguache	81125	Jul 01, 1899	open
Centerview	Rio Grande; Saguache	81125	Apr 22, 1898	Jul 01, 1899
Centerville	Chaffee	81236	Apr 22, 1868	Apr 30, 1930
Central City (Note: Located at an elevation of 8,498 feet (2,590 m), the Mountain City, Kansas Territory, post office was the highest elevation U.S. post office when it opened on January 17, 1860. Excavation of gold ore necessitated moving the post office uphill to Central City on October 8, 1869.)	Gilpin; Clear Creek	80427	Oct 08, 1869	open
Chaffee (Note: The Chaffee, Colorado, post office was renamed Monarch on May 14, 1883.)	Chaffee	81201	Jun 06, 1879	May 14, 1883
Chalk Creek (Note: The Chalk Creek, Colorado, post office was renamed Nathrop on September 8, 1880.)	Chaffee	81236	Aug 29, 1879	Sep 08, 1880
Chama	Costilla	81126	May 03, 1907	open
Chambers	Larimer		Sep 21, 1880	Aug 17, 1886
Chambers Lake	Larimer		Sep 21, 1926	NA
Chance	Gunnison		Nov 24, 1894	Dec 14, 1901
Chandler	Fremont		Aug 04, 1890	Oct 31, 1942
Chaney	Gunnison		Aug 25, 1892	May 10, 1894
Chapel (Note: The Chapel, Colorado, post office was renamed Graycreek on January 3, 1895.)	Las Animas		Dec 06, 1894	Jan 03, 1895
Chapelton	Weld		Jan 11, 1917	Jun 15, 1922
Chapin	Kit Carson		Feb 15, 1890	Nov 10, 1894
Chapman (Note: The Chapman, Colorado, post office was renamed Newcastle on April 23, 1888, and later the spelling was changed to New Castle.)	Garfield	81647	May 19, 1884	Apr 23, 1888
Chase	Park		Jul 15, 1892	Oct 31, 1911
Chattanooga	San Juan		Apr 04, 1883	Jun 04, 1894
Chedsey	Jackson		May 12, 1917	Jun 15, 1918
Cheeseman	Jefferson		Mar 05, 1900	Oct 31, 1904
Chemung	Cheyenne		Dec 22, 1906	Aug 15, 1910
Cheney Center	Prowers		Feb 24, 1917	Jun 30, 1936
Chenoa	Logan		Nov 19, 1886	Nov 19, 1895
Chenoweth	Elbert		Jan 16, 1897	Sep 29, 1900
Cheraw	Otero	81030	Aug 13, 1910	open
Cherokee City (Note: The Cherokee City, Colorado Territory, post office was renamed Latham on November 25, 1863, and was then renamed Evans on May 16, 1870.)	Weld	80620	Nov 25, 1862	Nov 25, 1863
Cherokee Park (Note: The Saint Cloud, Colorado, post office was renamed Cherokee Park on February 14, 1913.)	Larimer	80536	Feb 14, 1913	Feb 15, 1919
Cherokee Park	Larimer	80536	Dec 26, 1922	May 31, 1933
Cherrelyn	Arapahoe	80110	Jun 06, 1894	Feb 29, 1916
Cherry	Douglas		Apr 07, 1900	Aug 31, 1920
Cherry Creek	Arapahoe	80111	Jul 26, 1869	1886
Cherry Hills Village	Arapahoe	80110-80111; 80113, 80121		
Cheyenne Wells (1869)	Cheyenne	80810	Feb 10, 1869	Apr 11, 1870
Cheyenne Wells	Cheyenne	80810	May 08, 1876	Aug 21, 1895
Cheyenne Wells	Cheyenne	80810	Oct 02, 1895	open
Chicosa	Las Animas		May 19, 1890	Jun 30, 1894
Chicosa	Las Animas		Aug 02, 1896	Mar 31, 1904
Chicosa	Las Animas		Apr 07, 1905	Aug 15, 1910
Chihuahua	Summit		Jan 23, 1880	May 09, 1892
Chilcott	Pueblo		Mar 24, 1884	Oct 21, 1890
Childs Park	Hinsdale		May 09, 1912	Feb 28, 1919
Chimney Rock	Archuleta	81122, 81147	Nov 01, 1950	Apr 07, 1967
Chipeta	Delta	81416	Jun 14, 1895	Sep 07, 1895
Chipeta (Note: The Chipeta, Colorado, post office was renamed Naturita on September 15, 1882.)	Montrose	81422	Oct 21, 1881	Sep 15, 1882
Chipeta	Pitkin		Apr 20, 1899	Oct 17, 1899
Chipita Park	El Paso	80809	Mar 09, 1935	May 31, 1967
Chivington	Kiowa	81036	Oct 24, 1887	Jan 01, 1991
Chloride	Pitkin		Aug 05, 1881	Jan 03, 1882
Chromo	Archuleta	81128	Oct 30, 1885	open
Cimarron	Montrose	81220	Aug 28, 1883	open
Clanda	Las Animas		Feb 11, 1920	Dec 31, 1926
Claremont (Note: The Claremont, Colorado, post office was renamed Stratton on March 24, 1906.)	Kit Carson	80836	Sep 11, 1888	Mar 24, 1906
Clarence	Kit Carson		Feb 04, 1892	Mar 02, 1892
Clark	Gunnison	80428	Sep 16, 1889	open
Clarkson	Grand		Jul 28, 1892	Dec 08, 1898
Clarkville	Yuma		May 18, 1938	Apr 30, 1954
Claud	Elbert		Oct 030, 1882	Apr 03, 1888
Claytonia	Saguache		Mar 11, 1881	Mar 10, 1892
Clearwater (Note: The first Julesburg, Colorado Territory, post office moved to Clearwater on September 10, 1862.)	Sedgwick		Sep 10, 1862	Jan 20, 1864
Clemmons (Note: The Clemmons, Colorado, post office closed on October 31, 1898, but reopened as Schley on June 27, 1899.)	Elbert		Oct 23, 1882	Oct 31, 1898
Cleora	Chaffee	81201	Dec 05, 1876	Mar 07, 1882
Clermont	Elbert		Mar 25, 1881	Jul 23, 1883
Cleveland	Custer		Feb 05, 1885	May 13, 1886
Cleveland	Eagle		Mar 21, 1883	Aug 14, 1884
Cliff (Note: The Cliff, Colorado, post office was renamed Cliffdale on April 5, 1923.)	Jefferson	80421	Jan 24, 1889	Nov 02, 1894
Cliff	Jefferson	80421	May 04, 1896	Apr 05, 1923
Cliffdale	Jefferson	80421	Apr 05, 1923	Jun 15, 1933
Clifford	Lincoln	80821	Apr 11, 1908	Feb 28, 1918
Clifton	Mesa	81520	Aug 18, 1900	open
Climax (Note: Located at an elevation of 11,342 feet (3,457 m), the Climax, Colorado, post office was the highest elevation U.S. post office from March 31, 1919, until its final closing on January 7, 1974.)	Lake	80429	Apr 22, 1887	Apr 12, 1898
Climax	Lake	80429	Dec 05, 1917	Jan 07, 1974
Clinton	Custer		Aug 04, 1879	Oct 13, 1881
Clonmell (Note: The Clonmell, Colorado, post office was renamed Cramer on February 7, 1901.)	Fremont		Jul 18, 1898	Feb 07, 1901
Cloud	Gunnison		May 18, 1881	Nov 03, 1881
Cloudcrest	Jefferson		Apr 15, 1916	Oct 15, 1918
Clover	Huerfano		Dec 12, 1912	Aug 31, 1922
Clover	Mesa		Feb 01, 1895	Nov 08, 1895
Clover	Mesa		Feb 28, 1898	Sep 30, 1902
Clyde	Baca		Feb 18, 1889	Mar 28, 1890
Clyde	Baca		Oct 25, 1913	Jun 15, 1920
Clyde (Note: The Seward, Colorado, post office was renamed Clyde on October 12, 1899.)	Teller		Oct 12, 1899	Sep 15, 1900
Clyde	Teller		Sep 03, 1901	Sep 30, 1909
Coal Creek	Boulder		Apr 09, 1864	Oct 29, 1873
Coal Creek (Note: The spelling of the Coal Creek, Colorado, post office was changed to Coalcreek on May 31, 1894, but was then changed back to Coal Creek on July 1, 1964.)	Fremont	81221	Nov 04, 1873	May 31, 1894
Coal Creek	Fremont	81221	Jul 01, 1964	open
Coal Park	Boulder		May 05, 1890	May 13, 1895
Coalbasin	Pitkin		Dec 14, 1901	Sep 15, 1909
Coalby	Delta		Apr 11, 1906	Aug 15, 1912
Coalcreek	Fremont	81221	May 31, 1894	Jul 01, 1964
Coaldale (Note: The Hayden Creek, Colorado, post office was renamed Palmer on February 10, 1880, then renamed Hendricks on January 31, 1887, then renamed Coaldale on February 16, 1891.)	Fremont	81222	Feb 16, 1891	open
Coalmont	Jackson	80430	Mar 11, 1912	Dec 21, 1983
Coalridge (Note: The Coalridge, Colorado, post office was renamed Vulcan on October 26, 1893.)	Garfield		Aug 06, 1889	Oct 06, 1892
Coalridge	Garfield		Oct 23, 1893	Oct 26, 1893
Coalview	Routt		Dec 12, 1916	Nov 30, 1921
Cochem	Chaffee		Jun 05, 1897	May 08, 1899
Cochetopa	Gunnison		Feb 23, 1877	Jul 27, 1885
Cochetopa	Gunnison		May 21, 1892	Oct 31, 1911
Cochetopa	Gunnison		Aug 01, 1913	Aug 01, 1913
Cochetopa	Gunnison		Nov 04, 1914	Apr 15, 1916
Cockrell	Conejos		Oct 15, 1879	Dec 22, 1892
Cokedale	Las Animas	81082	Dec 26, 1906	Oct 28, 1997
Cole	Kit Carson		Mar 07, 1907	May 31, 1919
Coleman	Weld		Apr 10, 1915	Mar 31, 1919
Colfax	Custer		May 02, 1870	Jan 16, 1879
Colfax	Douglas		Jul 14, 1862	Oct 21, 1863
Collbran	Mesa	81624	Jan 09, 1892	open
College View	Arapahoe		Aug 07, 1946	Mar 31, 1948
Coloflats	Las Animas	81027	Aug 19, 1915	Jul 30, 1918
Colona	Larimer	80535	Apr 27, 1860	Feb 11, 1861
Colona	Ouray	81403	Oct 19, 1891	Mar 15, 1943
Colorado City (Note: Colorado City served as the seat of El Paso County, Jefferson Territory, from November 28, 1859, to June 6, 1861, as the seat of El Paso County, Colorado Territory, from November 1, 1861, to 1873, and as the capital of the Territory of Colorado from July 7, 1862, to August 14, 1862. On June 10, 1917, the City of Colorado Springs annexed Colorado City.)	El Paso	80904	Mar 24, 1860	Jun 30, 1917
Colorado City	Pueblo	81019	Sep 01, 1964	Aug 01, 2022
Colorado City	Pueblo	81019	Sep 19, 2022	open
Colorado Sierra	Gilpin		Aug 16, 1966	Feb 28, 1971
Colorado Sierra	Gilpin		Sep 08, 1977	May 01, 1980
Colorado Springs	El Paso	80901-80997	Dec 01, 1871	open
Colorow	Grand		May 24, 1882	May 30, 1903
Columbine	Routt	80428	Jun 05, 1896	May 19, 1967
Columbine Valley	Arapahoe	80123		
Columbus	Chaffee		Apr 10, 1882	Apr 11, 1884
Columbus	La Plata	81122	Nov 15, 1894	Jul 30, 1897
Columbus	La Plata	81122	Jun 22, 1898	Apr 30, 1903
Comanche	Adams	80136	Jul 06, 1911	Oct 31, 1923
Commerce City (Note: The Derby, Colorado, post office was renamed Commerce City on February 1, 1963.) (Note: The City of Commerce City, Colorado, was originally incorporated on December 18, 1952, as the Town of Commerce Town.)	Adams	80022, 80037; 80216, 80603; 80640	Feb 01, 1963	open
Como	Park	80432, 80456	Jul 23, 1879	open
Concrete	Fremont	81240	May 28, 1908	May 31, 1921
Condon (Note: The Condon, Colorado, post office was renamed Vernon on May 23, 1892.)	Yuma	80755	Jun 07, 1888	May 23, 1892
Conejos	Conejos	81129	Feb 25, 1862	open
Conger (Note: The second Conger, Colorado, post office was renamed Pallas on July 15, 1895, and was then renamed Huggins on March 23, 1906. The Huggins Post Office closed on September 15, 1908, but reopened as Pallas on August 21, 1912.)	Routt		Mar 27, 1894	Jul 15, 1895
Conger	Summit		Jul 08, 1880	Jan 03, 1881
Congress	San Juan		Apr 02, 1883	Jan 07, 1884
Conifer (Note: The Hutchinson, Colorado, post office was renamed Conifer on November 16, 1894.)	Jefferson	80433	Nov 16, 1894	Feb 28, 1929
Conifer	Jefferson	80433	Oct 01, 1960	open
Conrad	Park		Jul 07, 1897	Oct 14, 1905
Conrow	Chaffee		Aug 15, 1881	Nov 09, 1882
Consolidated	Huerfano		Sep 01, 1905	Oct 26, 1905
Content	La Plata		Sep 21, 1901	Oct 15, 1913
Cooper (Note: The Cooper, Colorado, post office was renamed Taylor on September 28, 1882, but was then changed back to Cooper on July 31, 1886.)	Eagle		Jun 15, 1881	Sep 28, 1882
Cooper	Eagle		Jul 31, 1886	Feb 06, 1890
Cope	Washington	80812	Jul 16, 1889	open
Copper (Note: The Copper, Colorado, post office was renamed Ionia on March 2, 1899.)	Mesa		May 09, 1898	Mar 02, 1899
Copper Mountain	Summit	80443	Sep 08, 1977	NA
Copper Rock	Boulder		Jun 30, 1892	Jun 30, 1903
Copper Rock	Boulder		Feb 18, 1915	Dec 15, 1915
Copper Spur (Note: The Coppertown, Colorado, post office was renamed Copper Spur on October 1, 1929.)	Eagle	80423	Oct 01, 1929	Feb 28, 1955
Copperdale	Jefferson	80403	Mar 22, 1882	Jan 30, 1883
Copperfield	Fremont		Jun 18, 1907	Dec 31, 1910
Copperton	Eagle		Mar 17, 1917	Aug 11, 1917
Coppertown	Eagle	80424	Dec 08, 1922	Oct 01, 1929
Coraville	Boulder		Aug 19, 1887	Nov 21, 1888
Coraville	Denver	80204	Mar 22, 1859	Jun 25, 1859
Corcoran	Washington		Sep 11, 1889	Apr 19, 1894
Cordova (Note: The Cordova, Colorado, post office was renamed Weston on September 9, 1889.)	Las Animas	81091	May 19, 1881	Sep 09, 1889
Corinth	Baca		Mar 18, 1887	Aug 12, 1887
Cornell	San Miguel		Mar 11, 1903	Jul 10, 1903
Cornish	Weld	80611	Nov 24, 1914	Mar 31, 1967
Cornwall	Rio Grande		Oct 31, 1879	Nov 20, 1882
Corona (Note: The Corona, Colorado, post office was renamed Wiggins on December 2, 1896.)	Morgan	80654	Apr 14, 1874	Dec 20, 1878
Corona	Morgan	80654	Nov 10, 1882	Dec 02, 1896
Corrizo (Note: The Corrizo, Colorado, post office was renamed Carrizo on December 14, 1907.)	Baca		Dec 13, 1899	Dec 14, 1907
Cortez	Montezuma	81321	Jun 21, 1887	open
Cortrite	Park		Nov 22, 1889	Mar 29, 1892
Cory	Delta	81414	Mar 12, 1895	open
Coryell (Note: The Coryell, Colorado, post office was renamed Stanley on January 8, 1890.)	Costilla		Aug 29, 1887	Jan 08, 1890
Cosden	Gunnison		Aug 28, 1883	Feb 04, 1885
Costilla (Note: On November 1, 1861, the Territory of Colorado created 17 original counties, with San Miguel as the original seat of Costilla County. When its post office opened on November 13, 1862, the village selected the new name Costilla, perhaps in recognition of its new status as county seat. In 1863, county voters decided to move the county seat 17 miles (27 km) north to San Luis. In 1869, a U.S. government survey determined that Costilla was actually located in Taos County, New Mexico Territory. It wasn't until October 21, 1872, that the village post office was officially renamed Costilla, New Mexico Territory.)	Taos NMT	87524	Nov 13, 1862	Oct 21, 1872
Cotopaxi	Fremont	81223	May 25, 1880	open
Cotsworth	Morgan		Sep 26, 1882	Jan 17, 1883
Cotton Creek (Note: The Cotton Creek, Colorado, post office was renamed Mirage on February 13, 1895.)	Saguache		Aug 09, 1875	Feb 13, 1895
Cottonwood Springs	Chaffee		Jul 28, 1879	Nov 23, 1885
Cottonwood Springs	Chaffee		Mar 05, 1890	Nov 11, 1895
Coulter	Grand		Aug 14, 1884	Oct 14, 1905
Cousin Springs	Pueblo		Oct 08, 1914	Nov 30, 1920
Coventry	Montrose	81431	Dec 26, 1894	Dec 15, 1917
Cowans	Lincoln		Nov 02, 1915	Jul 31, 1929
Cowdrey	Jackson	80434	Apr 05, 1915	open
Cowdrey	Larimer		Dec 21, 1901	Jan 15, 1907
Cox	Gunnison		Apr 25, 1903	Feb 15, 1905
Cragmor	El Paso		Feb 05, 1927	Dec 31, 1935
Crags	Boulder		Mar 04, 1911	Sep 15, 1913
Craig (Note: The Windsor, Colorado, post office in Moffat County closed on July 19, 1880, but reopened as Yampa on January 12, 1883, and was then renamed Craig on August 28, 1889.)	Moffat	81625-81626	Aug 28, 1889	open
Cramer	Fremont		Feb 07, 1901	Jun 30, 1904
Crawford	Delta	81415	Apr 14, 1883	open
Creede (1891)	Mineral	81130	Jul 01, 1891	Nov 28, 1908
Creede	Mineral	81130	Feb 09, 1909	open
Crescent	Boulder	80403	Feb 05, 1907	Feb 15, 1918
Crescent	Boulder	80403	Jun 25, 1920	Nov 15, 1922
Crescent	Boulder	80403	Oct 16, 1959	Feb 09, 1966
Crescent	Grand		Feb 14, 1889	Apr 16, 1894
Crescent	Jackson		Apr 07, 1880	Nov 22, 1880
Crest	Weld		Mar 08, 1909	Jun 30, 1923
Crested Butte	Gunnison	81224-81225	May 26, 1879	open
Crestone	Saguache	81131	Nov 16, 1880	open
Creswell	Jefferson		Oct 07, 1870	Feb 15, 1908
Cripple Creek	Teller	80813	Jun 20, 1892	open
Crisman	Boulder	80302	Jul 20, 1876	Jun 15, 1894
Crisman	Boulder	80302	Jan 04, 1898	May 31, 1918
Cristonie	Costilla		Feb 07, 1872	Oct 29, 1873
Critchell	Jefferson		Jun 19, 1899	Apr 30, 1945
Crocker	Summit		Feb 18, 1880	Oct 31, 1881
Crocker	Summit		Jun 16, 1882	Sep 13, 1882
Crook	Logan	80726	May 26, 1882	open
Crookstown	Saguache		May 25, 1904	Feb 28, 1906
Crooksville	Saguache		Jun 03, 1878	Dec 15, 1885
Cross Mountain	Moffat		Jul 16, 1919	Nov 15, 1943
Crosson (Note: The Crosson, Colorado, post office closed on August 25, 1885, but reopened as Crossons on June 2, 1920.)	Jefferson	80421	Aug 14, 1879	Aug 25, 1885
Crossons	Jefferson	80421	Jun 02, 1920	Dec 31, 1931
Crow	Pueblo		Oct 30, 1885	May 04, 1891
Crow	Pueblo		Sep 02, 1896	Nov 30, 1907
Crowley	Crowley	81033-81034	Dec 18, 1914	open
Crows Roost	El Paso		Nov 04, 1913	Jul 31, 1916
Crystal	Montrose		Jul 28, 1882	Oct 31, 1909
Crystal Lake	Jefferson		Jun 28, 1892	Nov 02, 1894
Crystola (Note: The Langdon, Colorado, post office was renamed Crystola on November 24, 1911.)	Teller	80819	Nov 24, 1911	Dec 31, 1913
Cuatro	Las Animas		Dec 21, 1903	Aug 06, 1907
Cuchara (Note: The name of the Cuchara Camps, Colorado, post office was shortened to Cuchara on June 15, 1957.)	Huerfano	81055	Jun 15, 1957	Jun 30, 1959
Cuchara Camps	Huerfano	81055	Jan 20, 1916	Jun 15, 1957
Cucharas	Huerfano		Sep 20, 1872	Jul 12, 1877
Cucharas	Huerfano		Jul 26, 1877	Jan 15, 1921
Cuerin	Saguache		Feb 04, 1884	May 21, 1892
Cumbres	Conejos		Nov 25, 1889	Sep 06, 1893
Cumbres	Conejos		Feb 08, 1895	Aug 31, 1901
Cumbres	Conejos		Dec 13, 1906	Jul 31, 1916
Cumbres	Conejos		Nov 01, 1923	Feb 27, 1937
Curran	Gunnison		Aug 08, 1880	Sep 10, 1880
Currant (Note: The name of the Currant Creek, Colorado, post office was shortened to Currant on October 2, 1894.)	Fremont		Oct 02, 1894	Feb 28, 1901
Currant Creek	Fremont		Aug 29, 1870	Oct 02, 1894
Curtis	El Paso		Oct 15, 1901	Mar 15, 1915
Curtis	Washington		Apr 27, 1888	Apr 30, 1901
Cyanide	Fremont		Oct 23, 1895	May 31, 1907

== D ==
Select the OpenStreetMap link at the right to view the location of some of the post offices in this section.

Post office	Current county	ZIP Code	Date opened	Date closed
Dacono	Weld	80514	Dec 21, 1907	open
Daffodil (Note: The Daffodil, Colorado, post office was renamed Deckers on February 19, 1908.)	Douglas		Apr 11, 1896	Feb 19, 1908
Dailey	Garfield		Sep 06, 1900	Dec 14, 1903
Dailey	Logan		Jun 28, 1915	Jul 07, 1961
Dakan	Douglas		Dec 30, 1896	Aug 02, 1898
Dake	Park		May 23, 1883	Oct 08, 1892
Dalerose	Las Animas		Jun 21, 1916	Feb 28, 1943
Dallas	Ouray		Feb 11, 1884	Oct 31, 1899
Dallas Divide	Ouray		May 24, 1894	Jul 23, 1909
Dallasville	Ouray		Dec 21, 1877	Jul 09, 1879
Damascus	Lincoln		Jun 06, 1914	Feb 15, 1917
Daniels	Jefferson		Apr 08, 1948	Jul 01, 1954
Davidson	Boulder		Dec 04, 1873	Apr 17, 1876
Davidson	Boulder		Jun 29, 1876	Apr 04, 1877
Davidson	Boulder		Jun 27, 1877	Oct 15, 1878
Davies	Pitkin		Jan 07, 1895	Oct 11, 1895
Davis	Las Animas		Aug 06, 1878	Apr 23, 1879
Dawkins	Pueblo		Feb 05, 1885	Feb 21, 1907
Dawson (Note: The Resort, Colorado, post office was renamed Vermillion on January 3, 1881, but then changed back to Resort on June 3, 1881. The Resort Post Office closed on May 11, 1886, but reopened as Dawson on June 9, 1890. The Dawson Post Office closed on June 30, 1894, but reopened as Foxton on January 21, 1909.)	Jefferson	80433	Jun 09, 1890	Jun 30, 1894
Dawson	Routt		Nov 27, 1917	Nov 15, 1919
Dayton	Gunnison		Jan 26, 1897	Mar 31, 1904
Dayton	Gunnison		Jan 13, 1905	Oct 31, 1911
Dayton	Kiowa		Jun 01, 1887	Dec 08, 1887
Dayton	Lake		Oct 16, 1866	Nov 30, 1868
De Beque (Note: The spelling of the De Beque, Colorado, post office was changed to Debeque on March 28, 1894, but was then changed back to De Beque on May 27, 1902.)	Mesa	81630	Mar 23, 1888	Mar 28, 1894
De Beque	Mesa	81630	May 27, 1902	open
De Nova (Note: The Dillingham, Colorado, post office was renamed De Nova on March 20, 1916, and a new Dillingham post office was opened on April 29 of that year.)	Washington		Mar 20, 1916	Mar 31, 1953
Dean	Las Animas		Apr 04, 1900	Jun 15, 1913
Deane (Note: The Deane, Colorado, post office closed on October 16, 1884, but reopened as Deansbury on June 23, 1890. The Deansbury Post Office closed on February 3, 1892, but reopened as Strontia Springs on September 27, 1911.)	Jefferson		Dec 19, 1879	Oct 16, 1884
Deansbury	Jefferson		Jun 23, 1890	Feb 03, 1892
Debeque	Mesa	81630	Apr 28, 1894	May 27, 1902
Debs	Hinsdale		Sep 10, 1915	Jan 31, 1925
Decatur	Baca		Jul 25, 1888	Aug 08, 1891
Decatur	Summit		Oct 03, 1879	Jan 28, 1885
Deckers	Douglas	80135	Feb 19, 1908	Nov 15, 1933
Deep Channel	Moffat		Jun 28, 1922	Aug 31, 1926
Deepcreek	Routt		Jan 30, 1900	Jan 15, 1936
Deer Trail (Note: The spelling of the Deer Trail, Colorado, post office was changed to Deertrail on May 17, 1894, but was then changed back to Deer Trail on October 1, 1950.)	Arapahoe	80105	Jun 03, 1875	May 17, 1894
Deer Trail	Arapahoe	80105	Oct 01, 1950	open
Deer Valley	Park		Aug 25, 1871	Nov 20, 1878
Deercreek	Jefferson		Apr 24, 1896	Dec 15, 1899
Deertrail	Arapahoe	80105	May 17, 1894	Oct 01, 1950
Del Mine	San Juan		Jun 22, 1883	May 19, 1884
Del Norte	Rio Grande	81132	Jan 28, 1883	open
Del Rio	Conejos		Aug 13, 1942	Jan 31, 1946
Delagua	Las Animas	81082	Apr 30, 1903	May 31, 1954
Delaware City	Summit		Nov 13, 1861	Jul 15, 1863
Delaware City	Summit		Sep 10, 1863	Jul 13, 1875
Delcarbon	Huerfano		Nov 20, 1915	Dec 31, 1953
Delhi	Las Animas	81059	Mar 16, 1908	Apr 19, 1913
Delhi	Las Animas	81059	Dec 26, 1919	May 30, 1975
Delphi (Note: The Delphi, Colorado, post office was renamed Wallstreet on April, 18, 1898.)	Boulder	80302	Oct 31, 1895	Apr 18, 1898
Delta	Delta	81416	Jan 05, 1882	open
Denver (Note: On February 28, 1861, U.S. President James Buchanan signed An Act to provide a temporary Government for the Territory of Colorado. On November 1, 1861, the Colorado Territory created 17 original counties with Denver City as the seat of Arapahoe County. Denver City continued to serve as territorial capital until July 7, 1862, when the capital was moved to Colorado City. On February 13, 1866, the name of the Denver City, Colorado Territory, post office was shortened to Denver. On December 9, 1867, the territorial capital was moved from Golden City to Denver, where it has remained. On August 1, 1876, U.S. President Ulysses S. Grant issued Proclamation 230 — Admission of Colorado into the Union. The City and County of Denver was consolidated on November 15, 1902.) (Note: The City and County of Denver is the capital of the State of Colorado.)	Denver	80202; 80201; 80203-80299	Feb 13, 1866	open
Denver City	Denver	80202	Feb 11, 1860	Feb 13, 1866
Denver Junction (Note: The second Julesburg, Colorado, post office was renamed Denver Junction on January 7, 1885. The Denver Junction post office closed on May 26, 1886, but reopened as Weir on June 21, 1889.)	Sedgwick	80737	Jan 07, 1885	May 26, 1886
Denver Mills (Note: The Sheffield, Colorado, post office was renamed Denver Mills on January 20, 1892.)	Denver		Jan 20, 1892	Feb 29, 1908
Denver Mills	Denver		Apr 17, 1908	Sep 30, 1916
Deora	Baca	81054	Apr 21, 1920	Mar 01, 1974
Derblay (Note: The Washburn, Colorado, post office was renamed Derblay on July 13, 1892, but the name was changed back to Washburn on December 22 of that year, only to be renamed Hazeltine on January 7, 1893.)	Adams	80601	Jul 13, 1892	Dec 22, 1892
Derby	Adams	80022	Jan 27, 1910	Jan 31, 1963
Derby	Eagle		Aug 16, 1888	Sep 16, 1889
Deuel (Note: The Deuel, Colorado, post office was renamed Weldona on July 18, 1907.)	Morgan	80653	Feb 15, 1883	Jul 18, 1907
Devine	Park		Feb 17, 1898	Jun 20, 1899
Dexter	Grand		Sep 25, 1896	May 20, 1911
Dickey	Summit		Feb 19, 1892	Sep 13, 1893
Dicks	Las Animas		Jun 29, 1926	Sep 30, 1935
Dickson	Huerfano		Jan 30, 1879	Jan 07, 1885
Dillingham	Washington		Jan 24, 1911	Mar 20, 1916
Dillingham	Washington		Apr 29, 1916	Jul 01, 1920
Dillon	Summit	80435	Oct 24, 1879	Jan 05, 1881
Dillon	Summit	80435	Jun 28, 1881	open
Dinan	San Miguel		Oct 09, 1929	rescinded
Dinosaur	Moffat	81610, 81633	Jan 01, 1966	open
Disappointment (Note: The Disappointment, Colorado, post office closed on June 30, 1920, but reopened as Willow Gulch on March 28, 1921.)	Dolores		Apr 19, 1919	Jun 30, 1920
Diston	Kiowa		Jun 29, 1908	Aug 15, 1908
Divide (Note: The first Divide, Colorado, post office closed on August 19, 1885, but reopened as Dolomite on October 11, 1886. The Dolomite post office was renamed Higgins on April 27, 1890, and then renamed Newett on April 22, 1895.)	Chaffee		Jun 24, 1874	Aug 19, 1885
Divide	Teller	80814	Jun 26, 1889	open
Dix	La Plata		Apr 08, 1890	May 14, 1895
Dix	La Plata		Jun 06, 1895	Sep 29, 1900
Dix	La Plata		Jul 20, 1907	Dec 14, 1907
Dodd	Morgan	80701	Apr 07, 1904	Dec 31, 1907
Dodgeville	Kit Carson		Sep 14, 1907	Dec 14, 1907
Dodsonville (Note: The Dodsonville, Colorado Territory, post office was renamed Linwood on April 14, 1876.)	Las Animas		Dec 10, 1873	Apr 14, 1876
Dolomite	Chaffee		Oct 11, 1886	Aug 27, 1890
Dolores	Montezuma	81323	Apr 05, 1878	open
Dome Rock	Jefferson	80433	Jul 12, 1880	Jan 05, 1881
Dome Rock	Jefferson	80433	Feb 21, 1883	May 11, 1886
Dome Rock	Jefferson	80433	Jun 25, 1907	Apr 04, 1911
Dominguez	Delta	81416	Aug 17, 1907	Oct 31, 1913
Dora	Chaffee		Jan 10, 1906	Nov 30, 1906
Dora (Note: The first Dora, Colorado, post office was renamed Gove on October 31, 1883.)	Custer		Jul 11, 1879	Oct 31, 1883
Doran (Note: The Horse Shoe, Colorado, post office closed on July 8, 1886, but reopened as Horseshoe on April 4, 1890. The Horseshoe Post Office closed on July 2, 1894, but reopened as Doran on November 1, 1901.)	Park		Nov 01, 1901	Jan 02, 1907
Dorchester	Gunnison		Aug 02, 1900	Jul 31, 1912
Dotsero	Eagle	81637	Jun 29, 1883	Apr 12, 1895
Dotsero	Eagle	81637	Aug 14, 1895	Sep 30, 1905
Dotsero	Eagle	81637	May 19, 1933	Feb 29, 1948
Douglas	Douglas		May 18, 1874	Dec 12, 1886
Dove Creek	Dolores	81324	Jan 16, 1915	open
Dover	Weld	80612	Dec 16, 1905	Apr 30, 1931
Downer	Boulder		Aug 09, 1904	Apr 15, 1915
Downing	Las Animas		Nov 03, 1886	Sep 14, 1896
Doyleville (Note: The Doyleville, Colorado, post office was renamed Gilman on April 9, 1882, but was then changed back to Doyleville on March 24, 1883.)	Gunnison	81230	Oct 24, 1881	Apr 09, 1882
Doyleville	Gunnison	81230	Mar 24, 1883	Apr 04, 1969
Dragoo	El Paso		Apr 19, 1915	Aug 15, 1916
Drake	Gunnison		Sep 13, 1881	Oct 05, 1882
Drake	Larimer	80515	Dec 14, 1905	open
Drennan (Note: The Hibbard, Colorado, post office was renamed Drennan in 1922.)	El Paso		1922	Oct 05, 1951
Drew	Gunnison		Feb 07, 1884	Jul 21, 1885
Drew	Gunnison		Nov 02, 1885	Mar 29, 1886
Driscoll	Fremont		May 02, 1896	May 27, 1896
Druce	Las Animas		Aug 31, 1916	May 02, 1922
Dryer	Jackson		Aug 03, 1916	Oct 31, 1917
Drygulch	Routt		Jul 02, 1896	Jun 02, 1898
Dublin Bay	Morgan		Jul 18, 1916	NA
Dubois	Gunnison		Jan 09, 1894	Feb 28, 1910
Dudley	Park		Oct 31, 1872	Oct 22, 1880
Duer	Prowers		Mar 25, 1916	May 31, 1920
Duff	Adams	80239	May 01, 1884	Nov 02, 1891
Duff	Adams	80239	Jun 23, 1892	Jul 28, 1896
Duke	Pueblo		May 05, 1908	Aug 04, 1908
Dumont (Note: The Mill City, Colorado, post office closed on May 26, 1879, but reopened on May 17, 1880, as the Dumont post office.)	Clear Creek	80436	May 17, 1880	open
Duncan (Note: The second Duncan, Colorado, post office was renamed Gotera on August 17, 1916, and was then renamed Lone Oak on January 23, 1922.)	Las Animas		Jul 08, 1901	Aug 17, 1916
Duncan	Saguache		Nov 21, 1892	Sep 15, 1900
Dune	Saguache		Apr 24, 1891	Jun 10, 1895
Dunkley	Routt	81639	Dec 16, 1892	Dec 31, 1942
Dunton	Dolores	81323	Aug 09, 1892	Nov 08, 1895
Dunton	Dolores	81323	Mar 19, 1896	Nov 30, 1954
Dupont	Adams	80024	Jun 19, 1926	open
Durango	La Plata	81301-81303	Nov 19, 1880	open
Dyke	Archuleta	81147	Apr 10, 1901	Sep 30, 1910
Dyke	Archuleta	81147	Dec 20, 1910	Jul 15, 1913
Dyke	Archuleta	81147	Mar 17, 1917	Oct 31, 1950

== E ==
Select the OpenStreetMap link at the right to view the location of some of the post offices in this section.

Post office	Current county	ZIP Code	Date opened	Date closed
Eads	Kiowa	81036	Nov 18, 1887	open
Eagle (1880)	Eagle		Oct 04, 1880	Mar 06, 1882
Eagle	Eagle	81631	Sep 03, 1891	open
Eagle Rock	Boulder		Jun 22, 1876	Jun 20, 1877
Eagalite (Note: The Eagalite, Colorado, post office was renamed Plateau City on August 26, 1901.)	Mesa	81624	Dec 03, 1885	Aug 26, 1901
Earl	Las Animas	81059	Jul 31, 1895	Aug 03, 1897
Earl	Las Animas	81059	Nov 19, 1900	Dec 15, 1923
Early Spring	Garfield		Apr 20, 1883	Jul 20, 1883
East Argentine	Clear Creek		Aug 26, 1867	Nov 15, 1867
East Portal	Gilpin		Oct 12, 1923	Jan 31, 1928
East Portal	Gilpin		Feb 14, 1933	Jul 21, 1934
East Portal	Gilpin		Dec 18, 1936	Jan 24, 1962
East Tincup	Jefferson		Jun 01, 1960	Sep 01, 1963
Eastdale	Costilla		Apr 27, 1895	Jul 15, 1909
Eastlake	Adams	80614	Jun 08, 1912	open
Easton (Note: The Easton, Colorado, post office was renamed Eastonville on September 28, 1883.)	El Paso		May 06, 1872	Jul 02, 1873
Easton	El Paso		Jun 24, 1874	Sep 28, 1883
Eastonville	El Paso		Sep 28, 1883	May 11, 1932
Eaton (Note: The name of the Eatonton, Colorado, post office was shortened to Eaton on September 28, 1883.)	Weld	80615	Sep 28, 1883	open
Eatonton	Weld	80615	Sep 25, 1882	Sep 28, 1883
Eckert	Delta	81418	Oct 27, 1891	open
Eckley	Yuma	80727	Nov 15, 1883	Jun 16, 1884
Eckley	Yuma	80727	Aug 14, 1885	open
Eddy	Routt		Mar 19, 1890	Aug 31, 1913
Eden	Pueblo	81008	Jan 14, 1890	Mar 31, 1914
Edenview	Las Animas		Feb 20, 1919	Aug 31, 1920
Edgerton	El Paso		Jun 16, 1870	Jun 07, 1895
Edgerton	El Paso		Sep 06, 1895	Aug 28, 1902
Edgewater	Jefferson	80214	Mar 01, 1892	Jul 15, 1937
Edith (Note: The Edith, Colorado, post office moved across the street to Rio Arriba County, New Mexico Territory, from May 5, 1904, until February 4, 1909.)	Archuleta	81147	Oct 28, 1895	May 04, 1904
Edith	Rio Arriba NMT	87528	May 05, 1904	Feb 04, 1909
Edith	Archuleta	81147	Feb 05, 1909	Oct 31, 1917
Edith	Routt		Feb 21, 1883	Jul 09, 1885
Edler	Baca	81073	Feb 16, 1916	Dec 31, 1947
Edlowe	Teller		Jun 09, 1896	Jun 16, 1899
Edwards	Eagle	81632	Jul 10, 1883	open
Edwest	Las Animas		Nov 14, 1916	Dec 26, 1919
Egeria	Routt		Apr 02, 1883	Mar 15, 1900
Eggers	Larimer	80512	Apr 23, 1926	Apr 30, 1944
Egnar	San Miguel	81325	May 28, 1917	open
El Jebel	Eagle	81623	May 01, 1973	Oct 04, 1976
El Moro (Note: The spelling of the El Moro, Colorado, post office was changed to Elmoro in January 1896, although the community continues to use the El Moro spelling.)	Las Animas	81082	Apr 17, 1876	Jun 30, 1880
El Moro	Las Animas	81082	Jul 01, 1880	Jan 1896
El Paso	El Paso	80817	Oct 21, 1862	Jul 11, 1893
El Rancho	Jefferson	80439	Jul 01, 1956	Feb 09, 1966
Elba	Washington	80720	May 09, 1910	Jan 10, 1958
Elbert	Elbert	80106	Mar 12, 1875	Jul 27, 1880
Elbert	Elbert	80106	Jun 27, 1882	open
Elco	La Plata		Jul 28, 1905	May 31, 1914
Eldora	Boulder	80466	Feb 13, 1897	May 19, 1967
Eldorado Springs (Note: The Hawthorne, Colorado, post office was renamed Eldorado Springs on May 1, 1930.)	Boulder	80025	May 01, 1930	open
Eldred	Fremont		Sep 09, 1892	Dec 15, 1907
Elephant (Note: The name of the Red Elephant, Colorado, post office was shortened to Elephant on April 22, 1881.)	Clear Creek		Jun 28, 1881	Nov 07, 1881
Elgin (Note: The Elgin, Colorado, post office was renamed Waunita on September 10, 1885. The Waunita Post Office closed on April 15, 1908, but reopened as Waunita Hot Springs on May 27, 1910.)	Gunnison	81230	Oct 11, 1882	Sep 10, 1885
Elizabeth	Elbert	80107	Apr 24, 1882	open
Elk Creek	Jefferson		Mar 23, 1864	Apr 18, 1865
Elk Springs	Moffat	81633	Jun 09, 1924	Mar 18, 1944
Elk Springs	Moffat	81633	Jul 16, 1948	May 06, 1966
Elkdale	Grand	80446	Jun 17, 1920	Sep 30, 1925
Elkhead	Moffat		Jan 17, 1927	Jan 31, 1929
Elkhead	Routt		Jun 02, 1884	Jan 28, 1885
Elkhead	Routt		Jan 04, 1910	Nov 15, 1917
Elkhead	Routt		Nov 10, 1919	Sep 15, 1924
Elkhorn	Larimer		Jun 05, 1879	Feb 06, 1890
Elkhorn	Larimer		Apr 14, 1900	Oct 31, 1917
Elko	Gunnison		Aug 15, 1881	Sep 24, 1884
Elkton	Gunnison	81224	Jul 14, 1881	Nov 15, 1882
Elkton	Teller	80860	Apr 02, 1895	Nov 15, 1926
Ella	Prowers		May 14, 1873	Feb 02, 1976
Ellicott	El Paso	80808	Apr 29, 1895	Jul 31, 1916
Elmoro	Las Animas	81082	Jan 1896	Dec 15, 1910
Elmoro	Las Animas	81082	Jan 20, 1911	Sep 15, 1933
Elphis	Kit Carson		Dec 08, 1916	Dec 31, 1923
Elsmere	El Paso	80915	Nov 18, 1889	Feb 04, 1890
Elwood	Rio Grande		Sep 18, 1882	Oct 05, 1883
Elwood	Rio Grande		Oct 02, 1895	Aug 16, 1899
Elyria	Denver	80216	Feb 15, 1895	Jan 15, 1904
Embargo	Saguache		Sep 25, 1903	Mar 15, 1905
Emerson	Phillips		Mar 27, 1888	Sep 20, 1890
Emery	La Plata		Feb 05, 1892	Nov 11, 1897
Emma	Gunnison		Sep 27, 1881	Nov 10, 1882
Emma	Pitkin		Nov 23, 1883	Jul 03, 1920
Emma	Pitkin		Jul 21, 1931	May 31, 1949
Empire (Note: The name of the Empire City, Colorado Territory, post office was shortened to Empire on May 7, 1866.)	Clear Creek	80438	May 07, 1866	open
Empire City	Clear Creek	80439	Jun 28, 1861	May 07, 1866
Engle	Las Animas		Mar 31, 1882	Sep 12, 1882
Engle	Las Animas		Jan 12, 1883	Apr 15, 1913
Engleburg	Las Animas		Jun 06, 1918	Oct 31, 1923
Englewood	Arapahoe	80110-80113; 80150-80155	Oct 24, 1903	Nov 30, 1913
Englewood	Arapahoe	80110-80113; 80150-80155	Sep 15, 1930	open
Enterprise (Note: The Kassler, Colorado Territory, railroad station was established in 1872, and the Enterprise, Colorado, post office opened nearby on October 3, 1879. The Enterprise post office was renamed Platte Cañon on March 11, 1881, and closed on May 21, 1893. The town changed its name to Watertown in 1916. The site is now known as Waterton.)	Jefferson	80127	Oct 03, 1879	Mar 11, 1881
Ephraim (Note: The Ephraim, Colorado, post office was moved about a half-mile (800 m) and renamed Sanford on June 2, 1888.)	Conejos	81151	Jul 05, 1881	Jun 02, 1888
Erie	Boulder; Weld	80516, 80514	Jan 24, 1871	open
Escalante	Mesa		Sep 09, 1903	Dec 05, 1903
Escalante	Moffat		Sep 18, 1889	Aug 31, 1893
Escalante Forks	Mesa		Oct 16, 1916	Sep 06, 1957
Eskdale	Adams		Jul 11, 1911	Aug 15, 1933
Espinoza	Conejos	81120	Feb 04, 1905	Sep 15, 1933
Estabrook	Park	80421	Aug 09, 1880	Apr 22, 1895
Estabrook	Park	80421	May 28, 1895	Nov 15, 1937
Estelene	Baca		Apr 08, 1910	Aug 10, 1927
Estes Park	Larimer	80517, 80511	Jun 02, 1876	open
Eula	Routt		Jun 23, 1900	Apr 15, 1902
Eureka	San Juan		Aug 09, 1875	Apr 30, 1942
Eva	Montrose		Jun 14, 1889	Nov 20, 1889
Evans	Weld	80620	May 16, 1870	open
Everett	Lake		Mar 31, 1881	Dec 15, 1887
Evergreen	Jefferson	80439, 80437	Jul 17, 1876	open
Eversman	Boulder		Sep 07, 1899	Aug 31, 1900
Excelsior	Mesa		Feb 18, 1899	Oct 16, 1890
Excelsior	Pueblo		Feb 16, 1866	Dec 19, 1866
Excelsior	Pueblo		Feb 19, 1867	Apr 24, 1871
Exchequer	Saguache		Jul 22, 1881	Jun 06, 1883

== F ==
Select the OpenStreetMap link at the right to view the location of some of the post offices in this section.

Post office	Current county	ZIP Code	Date opened	Date closed
Fair Play (Note: The spelling of the Fair Play, Colorado, post office was changed to Fairplay on October 1, 1924.)	Park	80440, 80456; 80432	Aug 02, 1861	Oct 01, 1924
Fairfax	Grand		Jan 14, 1884	Jul 09, 1885
Fairmount (Note: The Fairmount, Colorado, post office was renamed Swink on February 7, 1906.)	Otero	81077	Jan 19, 1900	Feb 07, 1906
Fairplay	Park	80440, 80456; 80432	Oct 01, 1924	open
Fairview	Custer	81253	Oct 24, 1882	Aug 31, 1893
Fairview	Custer	81253	Oct 15, 1907	Aug 15, 1913
Fairville (Note: The Fairville, Colorado, post office was renamed Slaghts on February 23, 1882, and was then moved about a half-mile (800 m) and renamed Shawnee on April 19, 1900.)	Park	80475	Sep 13, 1878	Jan 28, 1879
Fairville	Park	80475	Nov 07, 1879	Feb 23, 1882
Fairy	Fremont		May 18, 1881	Sep 28, 1881
Falcon	El Paso	80831	Oct 10, 1888	Sep 14, 1942
Falfa (Note: The Griffth, Colorado, post office was renamed Falfa on November 19, 1924.)	La Plata	81303	Nov 19, 1924	Nov 30, 1954
Fall Creek	San Miguel		Jun 22, 1933	Nov 13, 1943
Farisita	Huerfano	81040, 81089	Apr 24, 1923	Apr 07, 1990
Farley	Kit Carson		Mar 31, 1908	Oct 15, 1908
Farnham	Summit		Dec 02, 1881	Nov 02, 1895
Farr	Huerfano		Dec 03, 1907	Mar 26, 1946
Farwell	Garfield		Aug 25, 1888	Sep 18, 1888
Farwell	Pitkin		Jul 14, 1881	Jul 03, 1882
Farwell	Rio Blanco		Feb 05, 1892	May 10, 1894
Federal Heights	Adams	80260, 80221; 80234		
Ferberite	Boulder		May 27, 1916	Oct 15, 1918
Fergus	Kiowa		Jun 07, 1888	Sep 02, 1890
Ferguson	Garfield		Apr 16, 1883	Jul 01, 1891
Fidler	Fremont		Jun 17, 1881	Oct 26, 1882
Firestone	Weld	80504, 80520	Aug 30, 1907	open
Firstview	Cheyenne	80810	Jun 25, 1907	Nov 24, 1961
Fisher	Chaffee		Sep 12, 1889	Aug 15, 1890
Fisher	Pueblo		Feb 11, 1895	Jul 31, 1908
Fitzsimons	Adams	80045	Nov 02, 1921	Apr 30, 1923
Flagler	Kit Carson	80815	Oct 12, 1888	open
Flat Top	Washington		Jan 30, 1915	Jan 15, 1921
Fleming	Logan	80728	Aug 08, 1888	May 31, 1904
Fleming	Logan	80728	Sep 16, 1904	open
Flemming's Ranch	Weld		Mar 23, 1863	Sep 01, 1875
Flora	Sedgwick		Nov 04, 1889	Jul 30, 1894
Florence	Fremont	81226, 81290	May 08, 1873	open
Floresta	Gunnison		Jan 16, 1897	Nov 15, 1919
Florida	La Plata	81303	Aug 08, 1877	Mar 31, 1881
Florissant	Teller	80816	Nov 20, 1872	open
Floyd Hill	Clear Creek	80439	Sep 09, 1912	Jun 30, 1937
Flues	Las Animas		Aug 26, 1915	Jul 15, 1933
Focus	Custer		May 05, 1921	Oct 30, 1926
Folsom	San Miguel		Aug 17, 1880	Dec 13, 1880
Fondis	Elbert		Nov 25, 1895	Jul 15, 1954
Foothills	Pueblo		Aug 10, 1921	Feb 05, 1927
Forbes	Las Animas		Feb 13, 1889	Jul 20, 1896
Forbes	Las Animas		Mar 24, 1905	Jan 15, 1929
Forbes Junction	Las Animas		Oct 25, 1906	Jul 30, 1910
Ford (Note: The original Texas Creek, Colorado, post office closed on March 31, 1882, but reopened as Texas on May 12, 1882, and was then renamed Hillside on January 21, 1884. The Ford post office was renamed Texas Creek on September 10, 1885.)	Fremont	81223	Jan 04, 1881	Sep 10, 1885
Ford	Yuma		Jun 04, 1909	Mar 31, 1917
Forder	Lincoln		Mar 05, 1901	Sep 30, 1944
Forestdale	Custer		Oct 01, 1914	Apr 30, 1926
Forks	Larimer		Apr 05, 1898	Oct 14, 1903
Forks	Larimer		Dec 03, 1904	Jun 15, 1905
Forks Creek (Note: The spelling of the Forks Creek, Colorado, post office was changed to Forkscreek on June 4, 1895.)	Jefferson		Apr 05, 1878	Jun 04, 1895
Forkscreek	Jefferson		Jun 04, 1895	Jun 10, 1927
Formby	Montezuma		May 11, 1895	Feb 14, 1901
Fort Carson	El Paso	80902, 80913	1954	open
Fort Collins	Larimer	80521-80528; 80553	Jun 27, 1865	Oct 19, 1865
Fort Collins	Larimer	80521-80528; 80553	May 12, 1866	open
Fort Garland	Costilla	81133	Feb 25, 1862	open
Fort Junction	Weld	80504	Feb 05, 1866	Mar 19, 1867
Fort Lewis (Note: The Fort Lewis, Colorado, post office moved to Hesperus on October 10, 1891.)	La Plata	81326	Oct 05, 1880	Oct 10, 1891
Fort Logan	Denver	80236	May 03, 1889	Aug 31, 1971
Fort Lupton (1836) (Note: On January 18, 1869, the Fort Lupton, Colorado Territory, post office was moved about a mile (1.6 km) south from the stage stop to the settlement, and the old post office was renamed Weld.)	Weld	80621	Jan 14, 1861	Jan 18, 1869
Fort Lupton	Weld	80621	Jan 18, 1869	Apr 17, 1873
Fort Lupton	Weld	80621	May 09, 1873	open
Fort Lyon (1862) (Note: Fort Wise was renamed Fort Lyon in 1862. After flooding on the Arkansas River in 1866, a new Fort Lyon was built twenty miles (32 km) upstream in 1867.)	Bent	81052	Aug 02, 1862	1867
Fort Lyon (1867)	Bent	81038	1867	Dec 26, 1889
Fort Lyon	Bent	81038, 81054	Nov 01, 1921	Sep 20, 2002
Fort Moore	Logan		Jan 15, 1866	Jan 22, 1868
Fort Morgan (1864)	Morgan	80701	Jul 16, 1866	Jun 26, 1868
Fort Morgan	Morgan	80701, 80705	May 28, 1884	open
Fort Reynolds	Pueblo	81025	Jun 15, 1869	Feb 25, 1870
Fort Sedgwick	Sedgwick	80744	May 03, 1866	Apr 08, 1869
Fort Wise	Bent	81054	Sep 05, 1860	Aug 02, 1862
Fortification	Routt		Jan 15, 1883	Aug 27, 1885
Fortification	Routt		Apr 18, 1919	Jun 30, 1922
Fosston	Weld	80611	Apr 05, 1910	Jul 31, 1941
Fountain	El Paso	80817	Aug 08, 1864	open
Fountain Valley School	El Paso	80817	May 18, 1957	Jun 28, 1980
Fouret	Las Animas		Sep 14, 1919	rescinded
Fourmile	Moffat		Mar 16, 1895	Jul 24, 1899
Fowler	Otero	81039	Sep 06, 1890	Mar 20, 1900
Fowler	Otero	81039	Mar 31, 1900	open
Fox	Yuma		May 17, 1890	Dec 15, 1912
Foxfield	Arapahoe	80016		
Foxton	Jefferson	80433	Jan 21, 1909	Feb 13, 1993
Frances	Boulder		Oct 26, 1898	Jan 15, 1907
Franceville	El Paso		Nov 02, 1881	May 14, 1894
Franceville Junction	El Paso		Mar 12, 1892	Nov 15, 1899
Frankstown (Note: Frankstown served as the original seat of Douglas County, Colorado Territory, from November 1, 1861, until 1864.)	Douglas	80116	Sep 08, 1862	1864
Franktown	Douglas	80116	1864	open
Fraser	Grand	80442	Jul 26, 1876	open
Frawley	Summit		Jul 29, 1916	Jul 31, 1918
Frederick	Weld	80530, 80504; 80516	Dec 21, 1907	open
Fredonia	Bent		May 27, 1892	Sep 29, 1900
Free Gold	Chaffee		Apr 12, 1880	Apr 06, 1881
Freedom (Note: The Morgan, Colorado, post office was renamed Freedom on May 14, 1901.)	Conejos	81140	May 14, 1901	Apr 15, 1905
Freeland	Clear Creek	80452	Jan 16, 1879	Sep 15, 1908
Fremont (Note: The Fremont, Colorado, post office was renamed Morland on December 9, 1891, and then changed back to Fremont on February 4, 1892, and then renamed Cripple Creek on June 20 of that year.)	Teller		Jul 29, 1891	Dec 09, 1891
Fremont	Teller		Feb 04, 1892	Jun 20, 1892
Fremont	Washington		Oct 28, 1908	Feb 15, 1914
Fremont's Orchard	Weld		Aug 28, 1863	Apr 09, 1864
Fremont's Orchard	Weld		Oct 26, 1874	Mar 02, 1877
Friend	Yuma		Jun 27, 1887	Jul 31, 1901
Frisco	Summit	80443	Aug 29, 1879	open
Frost	Adams		Jul 15, 1899	Aug 15, 1901
Frosts Ranch (Note: The Virginia, Colorado Territory, post office in Douglas County was renamed Frosts Ranch on February 8, 1871, and was then renamed Rock Ridge on February 13, 1872.)	Douglas		Feb 08, 1871	Feb 12, 1872
Fruita (Note: The first Mesa, Colorado, post office closed on March 4, 1884, but reopened as Fruita on April 4, 1884. The second Mesa, Colorado, post office opened in the Plateau Valley on April 29, 1887.)	Mesa	81521	Apr 04, 1884	open
Fruitvale	Mesa	81504	Jul 01, 1948	Aug 24, 1950
Fulford	Eagle	81631	Feb 05, 1892	May 15, 1910
Fulton	Adams		Mar 27, 1866	Aug 22, 1867

== G–O ==
- List of post offices in Colorado from G through O

== P–Z ==
- List of post offices in Colorado from P through Z

Colorado post offices: A B C D E F G H I J K L M N O P Q R S T U V W X Y Z

== See also ==
- Bibliography of Colorado
- Geography of Colorado
- History of Colorado
- Index of Colorado-related articles
- List of Colorado-related lists
  - List of populated places in Colorado
    - List of census-designated places in Colorado
    - List of municipalities in Colorado
  - List of ZIP Codes in Colorado
- Outline of Colorado
  - United States Postal Service
    - United States Post Office Department
