= Casimiro Barela =

American politician from Colorado (1847–1920)

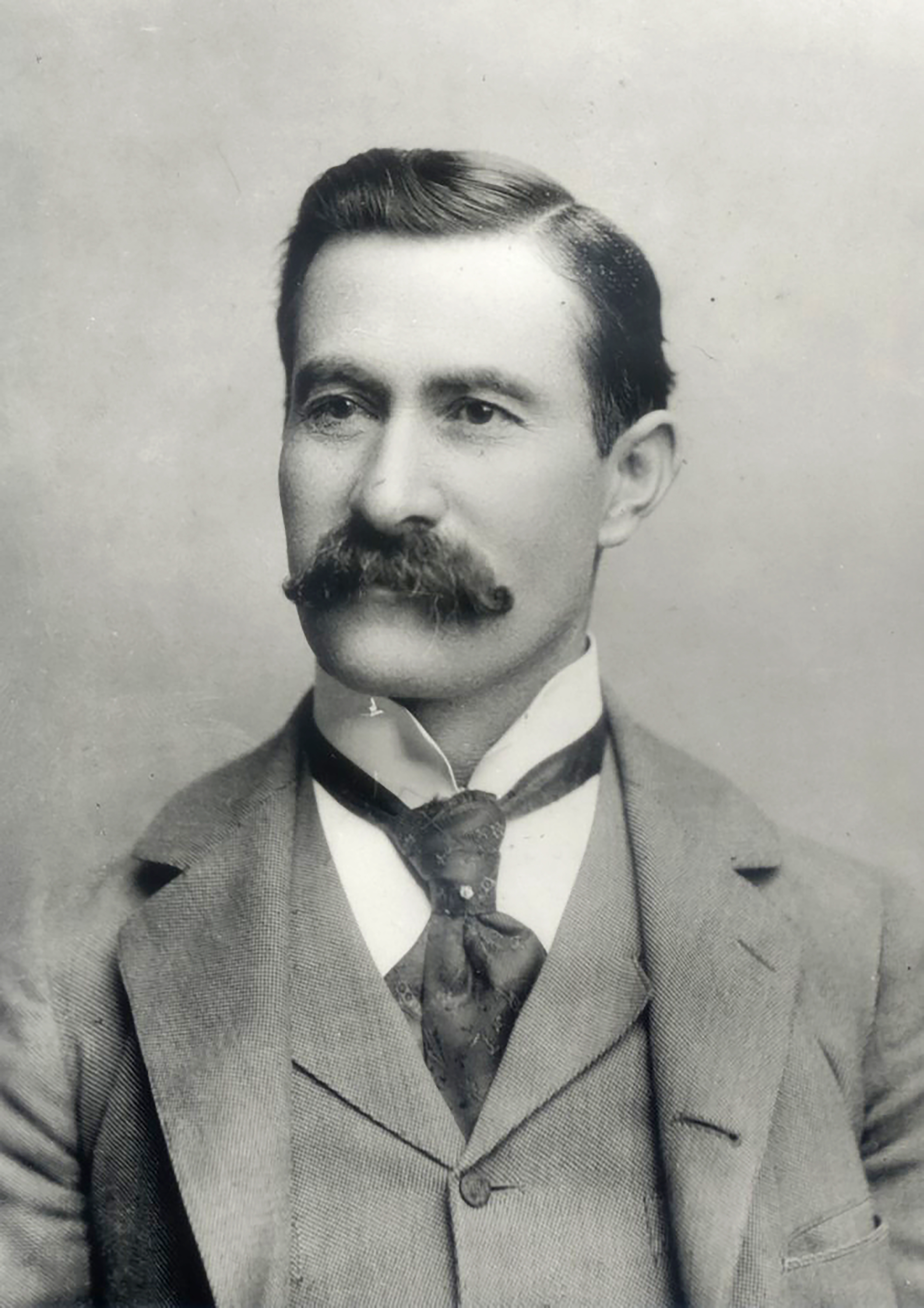

Member of the Colorado Senate from the 4th district
- In office January 3, 1893 – January 3, 1917
- Preceded by: Henry C. Bolsinger
- Succeeded by: Samuel W. DeBusk

Member of the Colorado Senate from the 18th district
- In office January 3, 1883 – January 3, 1893
- Preceded by: Juan A. Baca
- Succeeded by: Frank W. Smith

Member of the Colorado Senate from the 17th district
- In office November 1, 1876 – January 3, 1883
- Preceded by: Position established
- Succeeded by: A.J. Rising

Personal details
- Born: Casimiro Barela; March 4, 1847 Embudo, New Mexico
- Died: December 18, 1920 Barela, Colorado
- Party: Republican (1904–1920)
- Other political affiliations: Democratic (until 1904)
- Occupation: Colorado legislator and senator, Justice of Peace in Trinidad, Colorado
- Known for: Constitution of Colorado

Casimiro Barela (March 4, 1847 – December 18, 1920) was an American politician responsible for authoring the Constitution of Colorado. He served in both the Colorado Territory legislature and the legislature of the State. He was known as the "Father of the Colorado Senate" and served for 40 years. According to scholars, Barela's legacy in Colorado would show a willingness to work for the business class but to also guard the Hispanic culture and Spanish language speaking populace from the newer culture being introduced from the east, all while acting as a politician-patron for the people of Trinidad, Colorado.

== Early years ==
Born on March 4, 1847, in what would become New Mexico, Casimiro Barela was born in the middle of the U.S.-Mexican War that ended in 1848. Barela was born in the town of Embudo, which at the time was still a part of Mexico, but following the war became a U.S. territory. At a young age, Barela briefly dropped out of school to help his father, Don José María Barela, working as a cattle raiser. It was out in fields, where he frequently brought books to read aloud to his father, that Barela's father said: "My son, from today forward you will no longer assist me in my work; by all means, you will go to school". From then forward, Casimiro valued his education and prioritized his studies in his young, formative years.

== Career ==
=== Moving to Colorado ===
In 1867, Casimiro Barela moved from New Mexico to about 20 miles outside of Trinidad, Colorado. In Colorado, Barela slowly gained a great fortune by doing a variety of crafts, including: stock raising sheep and cattle, publishing newspapers, freighting, and merchandising. On his twentieth birthday, he married Josefita Ortiz, a daughter of a well-known family in the Colorado territory. When he was just twenty-two years old, Casimiro Barela was elected as Justice of the Peace in Trinidad, beginning his political career.

=== Politics ===
After being elected as justice of the peace in Trinidad, Barela was named County Assessor in 1870. While serving in this new position, in 1871 by popular vote, Barela was also elected representative to the Territorial Legislature. While fulfilling his public offices, Barela also found success with his several businesses on the side, and enjoyed spending time with his wife and young daughters in the early 1870s. In 1875, Casimiro Barela helped to write the Colorado State Constitution, and he guaranteed its publication in English, Spanish, and German. While fighting for the publication in multiple languages, Barela stated, "You may say that ignorance of the law does not excuse the breaking of it. I say it is the only excuse." Casimiro Barela served as a Delegate to the 1880 Democratic National Convention in Cincinnati, Ohio, and the 1888 Democratic National Convention in St, Louis, Missouri. In addition to his service as County Assessor and Justice of Peace, Casimiro also served as County Sheriff for Las Animas, ran a blacksmith and supply shop, and was a postmaster.

=== Colorado Senate ===
Following his role in the publication of the Colorado State Constitution in 1875, Casimiro Barela became a Colorado State Senator in 1876. While in the Senate, Casimiro Barela accomplished many political and social gains such as:

- Advocating for bilingual education, as many residents living in Southern Colorado had Mexican origins.
- Supporting the women's suffrage movement in Colorado in 1893, making Colorado one of the first states to allow women to vote prior to the 19th Amendment.
- Bringing Congress's attention to the Mexicans that became U.S. citizens because of the Treaty of Guadalupe Hidalgo, that were losing their land claims in the New Mexico territory.
- Helping push for New Mexico's statehood.
- Making Columbus Day an official holiday in 1907.

Casimiro Barela served for almost 40 years in the Senate, from 1876 to 1917. After gaining his seat in the first Colorado State Senate elections in 1876, he was reelected nine times. He lost his seat in the Senate in a surprising defeat by Democrat Samual de Busk in 1916. In addition, Casimiro started his career as a Democrat but later switched to the Republican party.

== Personal life ==
Barela married twice in his lifetime. He had nine children with his first wife, Josefita Ortiz. Only three of the children survived and in 1883, Josefita died. Barela would remarry the following year on February 16 to Señorita Damiana Rivera, who is recorded as having come from "one of the most distinguished families in the Territories of New Mexico". Together with his second wife, Casimiro adopted three more children. Barela died on December 18, 1920.

== Recognition ==
Barela, while alive and posthumously, has received many awards and has been recognized by many as "Father of Colorado State". Some of his accolades include:

- An installation of stained glass of Casimiro Barela in the dome of the Colorado Capitol in 1900, making him one of sixteen people honored in this way.
- Earning the "Legacy Award" for the 2016 Colorado Latino Hall of Fame.
