= Eastdale, Colorado =

Ghost town in Costilla County, Colorado, United States

- ghost town
- Location of Eastdale, Colorado. Eastdale (Colorado)
- Coordinates: 37.0286°N 105.6508°W
- Country: United States
- State: Colorado
- County: Costilla
- Elevation: 7,533 ft (2,296 m)
- Time zone: UTC−07:00 (MST)
  - Summer (DST): UTC−06:00 (MDT)
- ZIP code: (San Luis) 81152
- Area code: 719
- GNIS place ID: 193111

Eastdale is an extinct town in Costilla County, in the U.S. state of Colorado. Eastdale was a farming community on the Colorado/New Mexico border.

== History ==
Eastdale was laid out in 1890. The Eastdale post office operated from April 27, 1895, until July 15, 1909. The San Luis, Colorado, post office (ZIP code 81152) serves the area. A large share of the first settlers were Mormons.

== See also ==
- Alamosa, CO Micropolitan Statistical Area
- List of ghost towns in Colorado
- List of populated places in Colorado
- List of post offices in Colorado
