= Abbeyville, Colorado =

Ghost town in Gunnison County, Colorado, United States

- ghost town
- Motto: Strive to excellence
- Location of Abbeyville, Colorado. Abbeyville (Colorado)
- Coordinates: 38.7775°N 106.4922°W
- Country: United States
- State: Colorado
- County: Gunnison

Government
  - Body: Gunnison County
- Elevation: 9,932 ft (3,027 m)
- Time zone: UTC-7 (MST)
  - Summer (DST): UTC-6 (MDT)
- GNIS pop ID: 189092

Abbeyville is an extinct community located in Gunnison County, Colorado, United States.

== History ==
Abbeyville was a mining camp near the Gold Cup Mine, which was discovered around 1880. Named for C. F. Abbey, the camp grew around a smelter which was built on the site in 1881. The Abbeyville post office operated from November 20, 1882, until December 3, 1884. By 1887, S.S. Sutton was the only inhabitant of Abbeyville. There are a few remains of Abbeyville, possibly of the smelter.

== Geography ==
Abbeyville was located at 38.7775°N 106.4922°W at an elevation of 9,932 feet (3,027 m).

== Climate ==
According to the Köppen Climate Classification system, Abbeyville has a subarctic climate, abbreviated "Dfc" on climate maps. The hottest temperature recorded in was 86 °F (30.0 °C) on July 15, 1942, while the coldest temperature recorded was −60 °F (−51.1 °C) on February 1, 1985. The closest weather station is at the nearby Taylor Park Reservoir, which is where the climate data comes from.

Climate data for Taylor Park, Colorado, 1991–2020 normals, extremes 1940–present
Month	Jan	Feb	Mar	Apr	May	Jun	Jul	Aug	Sep	Oct	Nov	Dec	Year
Record high °F (°C)	54 (12)	51 (11)	61 (16)	67 (19)	79 (26)	85 (29)	86 (30)	84 (29)	79 (26)	75 (24)	65 (18)	57 (14)	86 (30)
Mean maximum °F (°C)	40.2 (4.6)	44.0 (6.7)	51.3 (10.7)	59.2 (15.1)	69.2 (20.7)	77.2 (25.1)	79.1 (26.2)	76.4 (24.7)	73.3 (22.9)	65.4 (18.6)	53.4 (11.9)	41.6 (5.3)	79.7 (26.5)
Mean daily maximum °F (°C)	28.5 (−1.9)	32.9 (0.5)	40.5 (4.7)	47.1 (8.4)	57.6 (14.2)	68.9 (20.5)	72.4 (22.4)	69.8 (21.0)	64.4 (18.0)	53.5 (11.9)	39.6 (4.2)	27.6 (−2.4)	50.2 (10.1)
Daily mean °F (°C)	10.4 (−12.0)	13.9 (−10.1)	22.4 (−5.3)	32.5 (0.3)	43.1 (6.2)	52.3 (11.3)	57.2 (14.0)	55.5 (13.1)	49.3 (9.6)	39.3 (4.1)	26.2 (−3.2)	12.0 (−11.1)	34.5 (1.4)
Mean daily minimum °F (°C)	−7.8 (−22.1)	−5.0 (−20.6)	4.3 (−15.4)	18.0 (−7.8)	28.6 (−1.9)	35.7 (2.1)	42.0 (5.6)	41.2 (5.1)	34.3 (1.3)	25.2 (−3.8)	12.8 (−10.7)	−3.5 (−19.7)	18.8 (−7.3)
Mean minimum °F (°C)	−31.7 (−35.4)	−30.1 (−34.5)	−22.8 (−30.4)	−1.5 (−18.6)	16.5 (−8.6)	27.9 (−2.3)	34.7 (1.5)	33.9 (1.1)	24.8 (−4.0)	10.7 (−11.8)	−7.7 (−22.1)	−28.9 (−33.8)	−35.7 (−37.6)
Record low °F (°C)	−56 (−49)	−60 (−51)	−42 (−41)	−29 (−34)	−5 (−21)	15 (−9)	30 (−1)	17 (−8)	4 (−16)	−7 (−22)	−30 (−34)	−49 (−45)	−60 (−51)
Average precipitation inches (mm)	1.69 (43)	1.55 (39)	1.32 (34)	1.64 (42)	1.53 (39)	0.87 (22)	1.95 (50)	2.18 (55)	1.63 (41)	1.39 (35)	1.36 (35)	1.69 (43)	18.80 (478)
Average snowfall inches (cm)	25.4 (65)	19.4 (49)	21.2 (54)	12.0 (30)	2.9 (7.4)	0.2 (0.51)	0.0 (0.0)	0.0 (0.0)	0.3 (0.76)	3.8 (9.7)	14.6 (37)	22.9 (58)	122.7 (311.37)
Average extreme snow depth inches (cm)	28.9 (73)	31.2 (79)	22.4 (57)	3.3 (8.4)	1.2 (3.0)	0.0 (0.0)	0.0 (0.0)	0.0 (0.0)	0.3 (0.76)	3.2 (8.1)	5.6 (14)	19.8 (50)	34.3 (87)
Average precipitation days (≥ 0.01 in)	8.0	8.7	7.8	8.3	8.2	5.6	11.6	12.1	8.2	7.3	7.7	7.7	101.2
Average snowy days (≥ 0.1 in)	8.2	7.5	7.6	4.5	1.3	0.1	0.0	0.0	0.1	1.5	5.4	7.7	43.9
Source 1: NOAA
Source 2: National Weather Service (snow/snow days 1940-2022, snow depth 2008-2022)

== See also ==
- List of ghost towns in Colorado
- List of post offices in Colorado
