= Baldwin, Colorado =

Ghost town in Gunnison County, Colorado, United States

- ghost town
- Location of Baldwin, Colorado. Baldwin (Colorado)
- Coordinates: 38.7639°N 107.0478°W
- Country: United States
- State: Colorado
- County: Gunnison
- Elevation: 8,767 ft (2,672 m)
- Time zone: UTC−07:00 (MST)
  - Summer (DST): UTC−06:00 (MDT)
- GNIS pop ID: 186670

Baldwin is an extinct coal mining town located in Gunnison County, Colorado, United States. The townsite is located at coordinates 38.7639°N 107.0478°W at an elevation of 8,767 feet (2,672 m).

== History ==
The Baldwin, Colorado, post office operated from September 17, 1883, until March 31, 1902. In 1909, a new Baldwin post office opened a short distance west over the hill, where it operated from June 26, 1909, until September 30, 1948.

Baldwin is located 8.5 miles (13.7 km) southwest of Crested Butte. While Baldwin is not commonly known as a ghost town, many of the original structures still exist. Much of the land that the few structures are on is now privately owned.

The town of Baldwin came to be because of the coalfields that were discovered at the base of Mount Carbon, now called Carbon Peak.

Baldwin became a ghost town due to the departure and subsequent abandonment of the Denver and South Park railroad that served Baldwin.

== See also ==
- List of ghost towns in Colorado
- List of post offices in Colorado
