= Bijou Basin, Colorado =

Ghost town in El Paso County, Colorado, United States

- ghost town
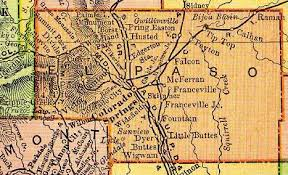
- Early El Paso County Colorado map. Bijou Basin was five miles southeast of Sidney in northeastern El Paso County

- Location of Bijou Basin, Colorado. Bijou Basin (Colorado)
- Coordinates: 39.1234°N 104.4602°W
- Country: United States
- State: Colorado
- County: El Paso
- Elevation: 6,400 ft (2,000 m)
- Time zone: UTC−07:00 (MST)
  - Summer (DST): UTC−06:00 (MDT)

Bijou Basin is an extinct town located in El Paso County, Colorado, United States. The townsite is located at coordinates 39.1234°N 104.4602°W at an elevation of 6,400 feet (2,000 m). Travelers could take post road 49 to the settlement. It was located five miles southeast of another early settlement, Sidney.

== History ==
The Bijou Basin, Colorado Territory, post office operated from April 8, 1869, until March 30, 1907. Colorado became a state on August 1, 1876.

== See also ==
- Colorado Springs, CO Metropolitan Statistical Area
- Front Range Urban Corridor
- List of ghost towns in Colorado
- List of post offices in Colorado
