= Beshoar, Colorado =

Ghost town in Las Animas County, Colorado, United States

- Ghost town
- Location of Beshoar, Colorado. Beshoar (Colorado)
- Coordinates: 37.2181°N 104.4066°W
- Country: United States
- State: Colorado
- County: Las Animas
- Elevation: 5,922 ft (1,805 m)
- Time zone: UTC−07:00 (MST)
  - Summer (DST): UTC−06:00 (MDT)
- GNIS pop ID: 194730

Beshoar is an extinct town located in Las Animas County, Colorado, United States. The townsite is located at coordinates 37.2181°N 104.4066°W at an elevation of 5,922 feet (1,805 m).

== History ==
The Beshoar post office operated from January 25, 1901, until June 30, 1903. The community was named after Michael Beshoar, a local settler.

== See also ==
- List of ghost towns in Colorado
- List of post offices in Colorado
