= Bowen, Las Animas County, Colorado =

Ghost town in Las Animas County, Colorado, United States

Bowen, Colorado
- ghost town
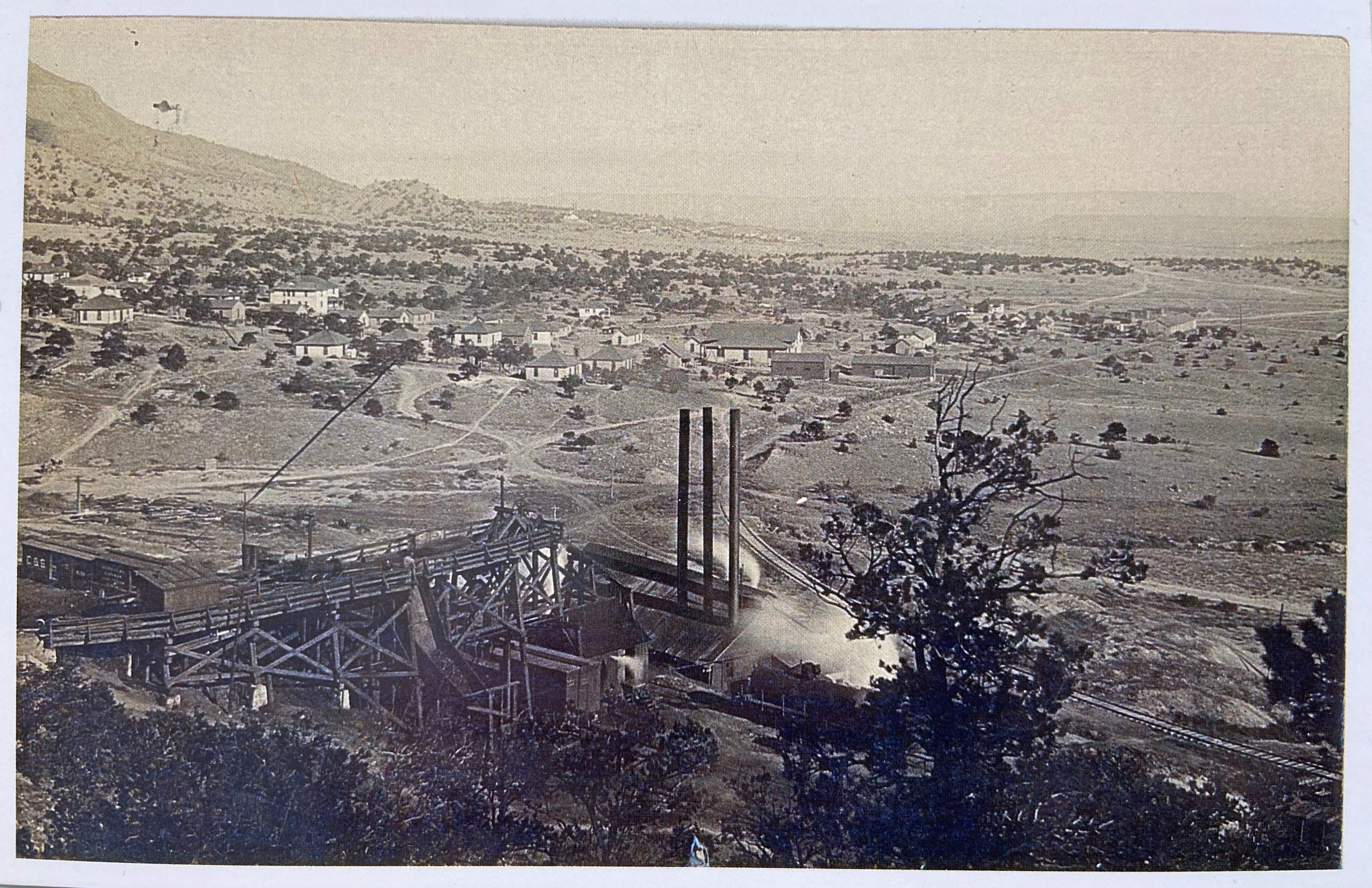
- Vintage postcard image of Bowen, Colorado, c. 1911
- Interactive map of Bowen, Colorado
- Coordinates: 37.250°N 104.499°W
- Country: United States
- State: Colorado
- County: Las Animas

Bowen is an extinct town located in Las Animas County, Colorado, United States.

== History ==
The Aylmer, Colorado, post office opened on March 23, 1900. On August 7, 1902, an explosion of dust ignited by giant powder at the Bowen Mine killed 13 people. The precise location of the town site is unknown to the GNIS, but newspaper articles reporting the 1902 Bowen Mine Explosion place the town "about a quarter of a mile below the mine", near Trinidad.

The name of the Aylmer, Colorado, post office was changed to Bowen on September 18, 1906, and it remained in operation until January 15, 1929. The community took the name of Thomas F. Bowen, the owner of the Bowen Mine and a state legislator.

The 1911 Colorado Business Directory described the town as "Coal mining town and station", population 200, on the Colorado and Southern Railway.

== See also ==
- List of ghost towns in Colorado
- List of post offices in Colorado
