= Colfax, Custer County, Colorado =

Ghost town in Colorado, U.S.

Coordinates: 38.00°N 105.47°W

Colfax was a short-lived communal farming community in Fremont County, Colorado Territory – now a ghost town in Custer County, Colorado, United States.

== History ==
Colfax was founded in 1870 as a communal settlement of 397 German immigrants led by General Carl Wulsten. The colonists had been organized by the German Colonization society of Chicago. The town was named for Vice President Schuyler Colfax. It was the first non-indigenous community in the Wet Mountain Valley in what is now Custer County, Colorado. The principal activities were farming and cheesemaking. The Colfax, Colorado, post office operated from May 2, 1870, until January 16, 1879, when the post office was moved four miles north to Blumenau. The communal effort failed after a frost and the settlers left the town. However, many of the settlers remained in the area as ranchers and farmers.

== See also ==
- Cañon City, CO Micropolitan Statistical Area
- Front Range Urban Corridor
- List of ghost towns in Colorado
- List of populated places in Colorado
- List of post offices in Colorado
