= Willard, Colorado =

Unincorporated community in Logan County, CO, USA

- unincorporated community
- Location of Willard, Colorado. Willard (Colorado)
- Coordinates: 40.5544°N 103.4863°W
- Country: United States
- State: Colorado
- County: Logan County

Government
  - Type: unincorporated community
- Elevation: 04,337 ft (1,322 m)
- Time zone: UTC-7 (MST)
  - Summer (DST): UTC-6 (MDT)
- ZIP code: 80741 (Merino)
- Area code: 970
- GNIS ID: 182787

Willard is an unincorporated community located in Logan County, Colorado, United States.

== History ==
The Willard, Colorado, post office operated from September 26, 1888, until April 19, 1894. Willard was named for Willard House, who owned land in the area. The post office reopened as Arnold, Colorado, on January 26, 1897, but the name was changed back to Willard on March 30, 1900. The Willard post office closed on February 28, 1901, but reopened on April 5, 1910, and operated until July 14, 1967. The U.S. Post Office at Merino (ZIP Code 80741) now serves Willard postal addresses.

== Geography ==
Willard is located at 40°33′16″N 103°29′08″W (40.554374,-103.485546).

== See also ==
- Bibliography of Colorado
- Geography of Colorado
- History of Colorado
- Index of Colorado-related articles
- List of Colorado-related lists
  - List of populated places in Colorado
  - List of post offices in Colorado
- Outline of Colorado
