= Eastonville, Colorado =

Ghost town in El Paso County, Colorado, United States

- ghost town
- Location of Eastonville, Colorado. Eastonville (Colorado)
- Coordinates: 39.0611°N 104.5622°W
- Country: United States
- State: Colorado
- County: El Paso
- Elevation: 7,235 ft (2,205 m)
- Time zone: UTC−07:00 (MST)
  - Summer (DST): UTC−06:00 (MDT)
- ZIP code: (AA) 80000
- Area code: 719
- GNIS place ID: 193298

Eastonville is an extinct town in El Paso County, Colorado, United States. A post office named Easton opened on May 6, 1872, but the name was changed to Eastonville on September 28, 1883. The post office closed on May 11, 1932. Eastonville is no longer incorporated.

The former town limits now lie in the Colorado Springs metropolitan area, near the Black Forest.

== History ==
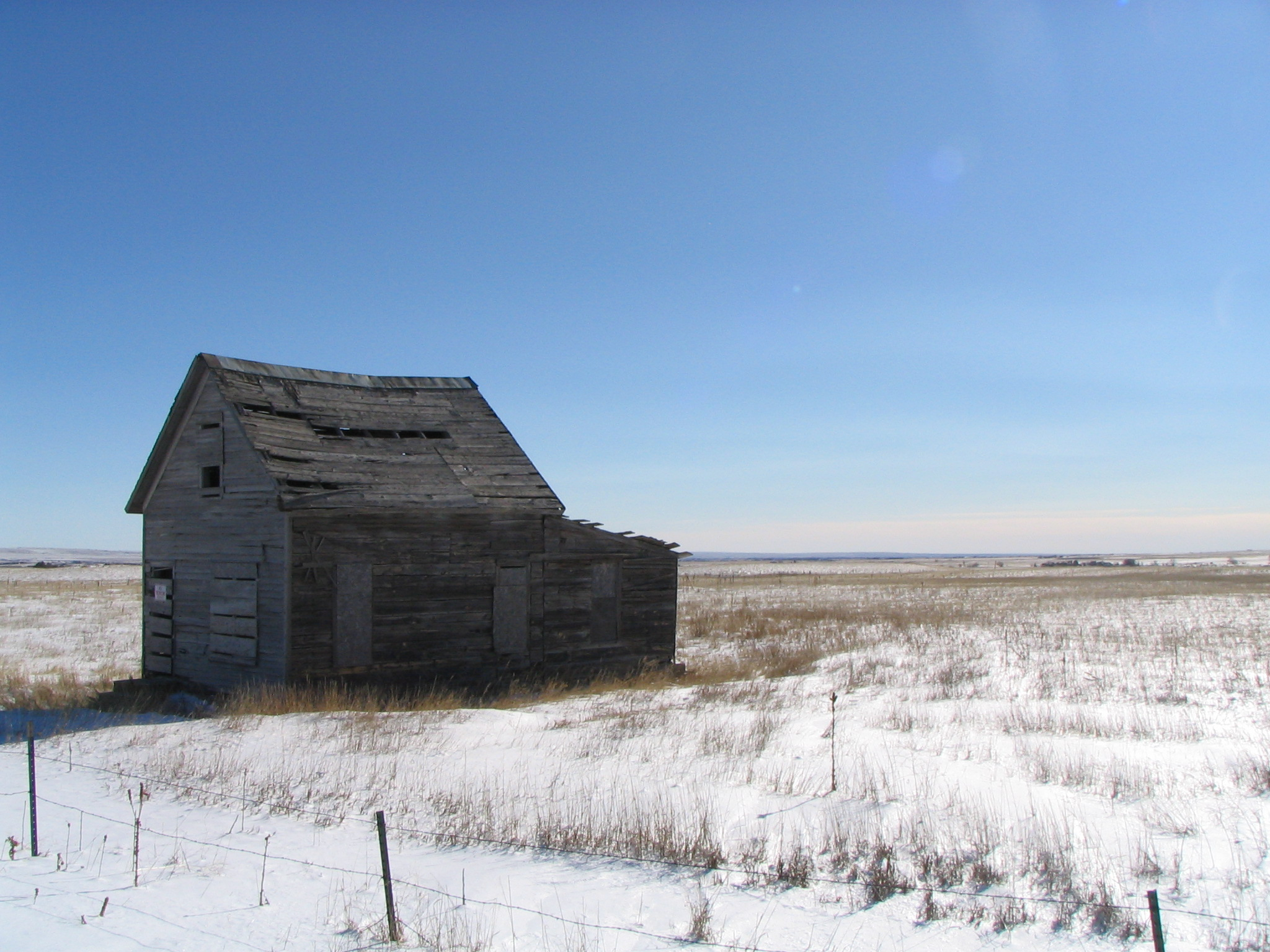
Abandoned house at Eastonville

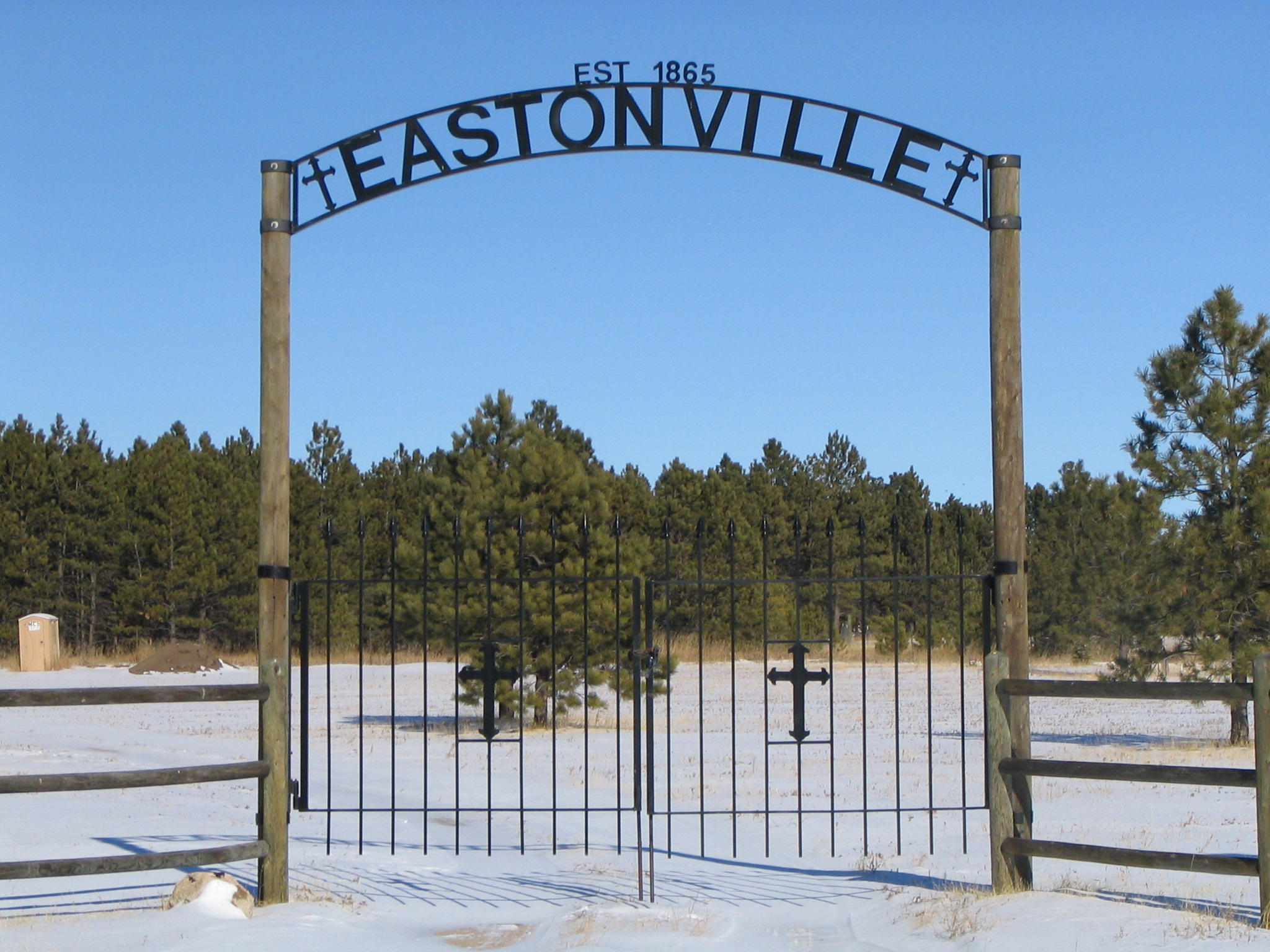
Eastonville Cemetery

The Easton, Colorado, post office opened on May 6, 1872, about a mile to the south of its eventual location on Squirrel Creek. The community was named for local pioneer John Easton. The area was located in the Black Forest of Colorado and was found to be suitable for potato farming and many pioneers homesteaded in the vicinity. In 1881 the Denver and New Orleans Railroad (later the Colorado and Southern Railway) laid their tracks through the area and created a stop named "McConnellsville" near what is now Eastonville; this was the main standard gauge line from Colorado Springs to Denver until the 3-foot-gauge Denver and Rio Grande was 3-railed. On September 28, 1883, the Easton post office was moved north and renamed Eastonville. At the behest of the railroad, the town moved a short distance to its current site.

By the 1900s the town had a population of 350-500 people. It had three churches, three hotels, a newspaper, a school house, race track, ball field, and many businesses. Nine to ten passenger trains passed through everyday. It had become the self-proclaimed "potato capital of the world", and some years couldn't find enough workers to harvest the crops. Colorado Springs newspapers would print large advertisements offering work at respectable wages on the potato farms of Eastonville. It was considered one of the most prosperous farm centers in eastern Colorado that are now ghost towns.

Eastonville continued as a stable town until the 1930s when drought and depression hit the west. The Eastonville post office closed on May 11, 1932. In 1935 the area endured a potato blight and a flood which washed away many buildings in Elbert, the next town north on the railroad; the railroad was then abandoned. The town couldn't recover without the railroad, especially since Peyton (6 miles away) still had the Rock Island railroad. Although little remains but a few buildings and the cemetery.

As the town died, the Eastonville school district was merged into the Peyton School District 23jt. Eastonville is, however, in the Falcon fire district.

== Climate ==
Climate data for Eastonville 2 NNW, Colorado, 1991–2020 normals, 2004-2023 records: 7210ft (2198m)
Month	Jan	Feb	Mar	Apr	May	Jun	Jul	Aug	Sep	Oct	Nov	Dec	Year
Record high °F (°C)	66 (19)	70 (21)	75 (24)	81 (27)	87 (31)	94 (34)	95 (35)	93 (34)	94 (34)	81 (27)	74 (23)	68 (20)	95 (35)
Mean maximum °F (°C)	59.3 (15.2)	60.8 (16.0)	68.8 (20.4)	75.8 (24.3)	79.2 (26.2)	89.6 (32.0)	90.7 (32.6)	87.4 (30.8)	86.9 (30.5)	76.2 (24.6)	68.8 (20.4)	61.3 (16.3)	91.9 (33.3)
Mean daily maximum °F (°C)	41.4 (5.2)	42.4 (5.8)	49.5 (9.7)	56.4 (13.6)	65.7 (18.7)	76.1 (24.5)	80.9 (27.2)	78.8 (26.0)	72.0 (22.2)	60.3 (15.7)	49.5 (9.7)	39.9 (4.4)	59.4 (15.2)
Daily mean °F (°C)	25.4 (−3.7)	27.5 (−2.5)	35.4 (1.9)	41.8 (5.4)	50.6 (10.3)	59.8 (15.4)	65.1 (18.4)	63.5 (17.5)	55.6 (13.1)	43.8 (6.6)	33.5 (0.8)	24.6 (−4.1)	43.9 (6.6)
Mean daily minimum °F (°C)	9.3 (−12.6)	12.6 (−10.8)	21.3 (−5.9)	27.2 (−2.7)	35.4 (1.9)	43.5 (6.4)	49.2 (9.6)	48.2 (9.0)	39.2 (4.0)	27.3 (−2.6)	17.4 (−8.1)	9.2 (−12.7)	28.3 (−2.0)
Mean minimum °F (°C)	−14.3 (−25.7)	−14.6 (−25.9)	−2.5 (−19.2)	8.3 (−13.2)	21.3 (−5.9)	32.6 (0.3)	41.8 (5.4)	39.6 (4.2)	28.1 (−2.2)	6.6 (−14.1)	−2.9 (−19.4)	−14.4 (−25.8)	−19.2 (−28.4)
Record low °F (°C)	−22 (−30)	−26 (−32)	−11 (−24)	−11 (−24)	10 (−12)	28 (−2)	35 (2)	33 (1)	23 (−5)	−10 (−23)	−20 (−29)	−27 (−33)	−27 (−33)
Average precipitation inches (mm)	0.63 (16)	0.64 (16)	1.50 (38)	2.39 (61)	2.72 (69)	2.26 (57)	3.88 (99)	3.48 (88)	1.43 (36)	1.24 (31)	0.85 (22)	0.61 (15)	21.63 (548)
Average snowfall inches (cm)	11.50 (29.2)	9.90 (25.1)	19.00 (48.3)	22.20 (56.4)	6.70 (17.0)	0.70 (1.8)	0.00 (0.00)	0.00 (0.00)	1.40 (3.6)	8.10 (20.6)	10.90 (27.7)	11.30 (28.7)	101.7 (258.4)
Average precipitation days (≥ 0.01 in)	5.6	6.2	7.7	9.0	10.8	9.3	11.8	12.0	5.9	5.2	5.6	5.6	94.7
Average snowy days (≥ 0.1 in)	6.0	6.2	7.5	7.3	2.4	0.3	0.0	0.0	0.6	2.6	5.4	5.6	43.9
Source 1: NOAA
Source 2: XMACIS2 (records & monthly max/mins)

== See also ==
- Colorado Springs, CO Metropolitan Statistical Area
- Front Range Urban Corridor
- List of ghost towns in Colorado
- List of populated places in Colorado
- List of post offices in Colorado
