= Adena, Colorado =

Ghost town in Morgan County, Colorado, United States

- ghost town
- Location of Adena, Colorado. Adena (Colorado)
- Coordinates: 40.0083°N 103.8866°W
- Country: United States
- State: Colorado
- County: Morgan

Government
  - Body: Morgan County
- Elevation: 4,692 ft (1,430 m)
- GNIS pop ID: 182997

Adena is an extinct town located in Morgan County, Colorado, United States.

== History ==
The Adena post office operated from November 8, 1910, until September 15, 1949. The community has the name of Edna Adena, a local resident.

== Geography ==
The Adena townsite is located at coordinates 37.4028°N 104.6533°W, at an elevation of 4,692 feet (1,430 m).

== See also ==
- Fort Morgan, CO Micropolitan Statistical Area
- List of ghost towns in Colorado
- List of post offices in Colorado
