= Barr Lake, Colorado =

Unincorporated community in Adams County, Colorado, United States

- unincorporated community
- Location of Barr Lake, Colorado. Barr Lake (Colorado)
- Coordinates: 39°56′40″N 104°46′31″W
- Country: United States
- State: Colorado
- County: Adams

Government
  - Type: unincorporated community
  - Body: Adams County
- Elevation: 5,115 ft (1,559 m)
- Time zone: UTC−07:00 (MST)
  - Summer (DST): UTC−06:00 (MDT)
- Area codes: 303/720/983
- GNIS pop ID: 184609

Barr Lake is an unincorporated community and former post office in Adams County, Colorado, United States. It is located within the Denver metropolitan area.

It is located near the Barr Lake State Park.

School District 27J serves Barr Lake. Kids attend Henderson Elementary School and Prairie View Middle School.

== History ==
Barr Lake was originally named Platte Summit. The Barr, Colorado, post office opened on March 15, 1883. Barr was named for a Mr. Barr, a civil engineer for the Chicago, Burlington and Quincy Railroad. The Barr post office was renamed Barr Lake, Colorado, on October 17, 1914, and remained in operation until August 31, 1952.

== See also ==
- Denver-Aurora-Lakewood, CO Metropolitan Statistical Area
