= Lobatos, Colorado =

Unincorporated community in Conejos County, Colorado, US

Lobatos
- unincorporated community
- Location within the state of Colorado
- Coordinates: 37°04′46″N 105°56′56″W
- Country: United States
- State: Colorado
- County: Conejos
- Founded: 1902 (post office)
- Named for: Spanish for "wolf cubs"
- Time zone: UTC-7 (MST)
  - Summer (DST): UTC-6 (MDT)

Lobatos is an unincorporated community in Conejos County, in the U.S. state of Colorado.

== History ==
A post office called Lobatos was established in 1902, and remained in operation until 1920. Lobatos is a name derived from Spanish meaning "wolf cubs".
