= Abeyta, Colorado =

Ghost town in Las Animas County, Colorado, United States

- ghost town
- Location of Abeyta, Colorado. Abeyta (Colorado)
- Coordinates: 37°04′47″N 104°11′11″W
- Country: United States
- State: Colorado
- County: Las Animas
- Established: 1914

Government
  - Body: Las Animas County
- Elevation: 5,725 ft (1,745 m)
- Time zone: UTC−07:00 (MST)
  - Summer (DST): UTC−06:00 (MDT)
- GNIS pop ID: 194941

Abeyta is an extinct town in Las Animas County, in the U.S. state of Colorado.

== History ==
Originally known as San Isidro, the Abeyta post office operated for a few days in December 1914. The community was named after Mrs. Abeyta, the mother of one Casimiro Barela.

== See also ==
- List of ghost towns in Colorado
