= Barela, Colorado =

Unincorporated community in Las Animas County, Colorado, United States

- Unincorporated community
- Location of Barela, Colorado. Barela (Colorado)
- Coordinates: 37°06′56″N 104°15′32″W
- Country: United States
- State: Colorado
- County: Las Animas

Government
  - Type: Unincorporated community
  - Body: Las Animas County
- Elevation: 5,761 ft (1,756 m)
- Time zone: UTC−07:00 (MST)
  - Summer (DST): UTC−06:00 (MDT)
- GNIS pop ID: 194884

Barela is an unincorporated community located in Las Animas County, Colorado, United States.

== History ==
The Barela, Colorado Territory, post office operated from July 28, 1874, until September 30, 1931. The community is named in honor of Casimiro Barela, a member of the Colorado General Assembly who co-authored the Constitution of Colorado. Colorado became a state on August 1, 1876.

== See also ==
- List of populated places in Colorado
