= Waterton, Colorado =

Coordinates: 39°29′37″N 105°05′19″W

Waterton, Colorado is a populated place located along the South Platte River in Platte Canyon (also known as Waterton Canyon) of Jefferson County, Colorado. Cañon Spur in Waterton was a Denver, South Park and Pacific Railroad (DSP&P) station. It was a settlement named Enterprise, with a post office from 1879 to 1881. Its name was changed to Platte Cañon, legally changed to Watertown in 1916, and is now known as Waterton. It is located near Kassler, another DSP&P station, established in 1872.
