= List of post offices in Colorado: P–Z =

Coordinates: 38.9972°N 105.5478°W

The 64 counties of the U.S. State of Colorado.

This is a list of United States post offices which currently operate, or previously operated, in the area of the State of Colorado. For post offices currently in operation: the first ZIP Code is the ZIP Code of the postmaster. The postal service requires that each post office name be unique within a state or territory, however the name of a post office that closed or changed its name may be reused for another post office.

- See the List of populated places in Colorado for location information.
- See the List of ZIP Codes in Colorado for currently assigned 5-digit ZIP Codes.

Visual guide
Post offices currently in operation
Post offices that have been renamed
Postal addresses now served by another post office
Former post offices

Colorado post offices: A B C D E F G H I J K L M N O P Q R S T U V W X Y Z

== A–F ==
- List of post offices in Colorado from A through F

== G–O ==
- List of post offices in Colorado from G through O

== P ==
Select the OpenStreetMap link at the right to view the location of some of the post offices in this section.

| Post office | Current county | ZIP Code | Date opened | Date closed |
|---|---|---|---|---|
| Pactolus | Gilpin | 80422 | Mar 09, 1911 | Oct 15, 1912 |
| Padroni | Logan | 80745 | Nov 10, 1909 | open |
| Pagoda | Routt | | Feb 15, 1890 | Mar 31, 1947 |
| Pagosa Junction (Note: Pagosa Junction, Colorado, was also known as Gato.) | Archuleta | 81147 | Jul 25, 1899 | Nov 30, 1954 |
| Pagosa Springs | Archuleta | 81147, 81157 | Jun 07, 1878 | open |
| Paige City (Note: The Paige City, Colorado Territory, post office was renamed Lincoln City on August 1, 1861.) | Summit | 80424 | Jun 28, 1861 | Aug 01, 1861 |
| Paisaje (Note: The San Rafael, Colorado, post office closed on January 24, 1895, but reopened as the Paisaje post office on June 25, 1906.) | Conejos | 81120 | Jun 25, 1906 | Dec 31, 1920 |
| Palisade (Note: The name of the Palisades, Colorado, post office was shortened to Palisade on November 1, 1924.) | Mesa | 81526 | Nov 01, 1924 | open |
| Palisades | Mesa | 81526 | Jan 26, 1891 | Nov 01, 1924 |
| Pallas (Note: The second Conger, Colorado, post office was renamed Pallas on July 15, 1895, and was then renamed Huggins on March 23, 1906. The Huggins Post Office closed on September 15, 1908, but reopened as Pallas on August 21, 1912.) | Routt | | Jul 15, 1895 | Aug 31, 1903 |
| Pallas | Routt | | Apr 22, 1904 | Mar 23, 1906 |
| Pallas | Routt | | Aug 21, 1912 | Aug 15, 1919 |
| Pallas | Routt | | May 23, 1922 | Mar 12, 1926 |
| Palmer (Note: On March 22, 1887, the Weissport, Colorado, post office moved about a quarter-mile (400 m) to Palmer. The name of the Palmer post office was changed to Palmer Lake on April 26, 1887, then changed back to Palmer on September 11, 1894, then changed back to Palmer Lake on June 17, 1912.) | El Paso | 80133 | Mar 22, 1887 | Apr 26, 1887 |
| Palmer | El Paso | 80133 | Sep 11, 1894 | Jun 17, 1912 |
| Palmer (Note: The Hayden Creek, Colorado, post office was renamed Palmer on February 10, 1880, then renamed Hendricks on January 31, 1887, then renamed Coaldale on February 16, 1891.) | Fremont | 81222 | Feb 10, 1880 | Jan 31, 1887 |
| Palmer Lake | El Paso | 80133 | Apr 26, 1887 | Sep 11, 1894 |
| Palmer Lake | El Paso | 80133 | Jun 17, 1912 | open |
| Pandora | San Miguel | 81435 | Aug 05, 1881 | Nov 12, 1885 |
| Pandora | San Miguel | 81435 | Mar 28, 1902 | Oct 15, 1902 |
| Paoli | Phillips | 80746 | Jun 08, 1888 | Feb 11, 1890 |
| Paoli | Phillips | 80746 | Mar 09, 1910 | Aug 12, 2017 |
| Paonia | Delta | 81428 | Jun 07, 1882 | open |
| Parachute (Note: The Town of Parachute, Colorado, was originally incorporated on April 1, 1908, as the Town of Grand Valley. The Grand Valley post office was renamed Parachute on July 4, 1980.) | Garfield | 81635 | Jul 27, 1885 | Aug 19, 1904 |
| Parachute | Garfield | 81635 | Jul 04, 1980 | open |
| Paradox | Montrose | 81429 | Jan 09, 1882 | open |
| Pargin | La Plata | | Jul 24, 1901 | Jan 15, 1903 |
| Park | Park | | Nov 26, 1879 | Apr 14, 1891 |
| Park Siding (Note: The Park Siding, Colorado, post office closed on May 21, 1896, but reopened as Foxton on January 21, 1909.) | Jefferson | 80433 | Dec 27, 1890 | May 21, 1896 |
| Parkdale | Fremont | 81212 | Aug 16, 1880 | Nov 28, 1881 |
| Parkdale | Fremont | 81212 | Feb 01, 1882 | Jul 03, 1883 |
| Parkdale | Fremont | 81212 | Sep 03, 1883 | Jan 01, 1889 |
| Parkdale | Fremont | 81212 | Feb 05, 1889 | Jul 31, 1970 |
| Parker (Note: The Pine Grove, Colorado, post office was renamed Parker on March 17, 1882.) | Douglas | 80134, 80138 | May 17, 1882 | open |
| Parkville (Note: The Sedgewick, Colorado, post office in Saguache County moved to Parkville on January 12, 1885.) | Saguache | 81155 | Jan 12, 1885 | Mar 02, 1886 |
| Parkville (Note: Parkville served as the original seat of Summit County, Colorado Territory, from November 1, 1861, until 1862.) | Summit | | Dec 13, 1861 | Oct 22, 1866 |
| Parlin (Note: The Tumichi, Colorado, post office was renamed Parlin on August 23, 1880.) | Gunnison | 81239 | Aug 23, 1880 | open |
| Parma (Note: The Parma, Colorado, post office was renamed Liberty on October 11, 1887. The Liberty Post Office closed on April 30, 1898, but reopened as Parma on March 27, 1906.) | Alamosa | 81144 | Mar 20, 1886 | Oct 11, 1887 |
| Parma | Alamosa | 81144 | Mar 27, 1906 | Jun 15, 1910 |
| Parrott (Note: Parrott, Colorado, was commonly known as Parrott City. The Parrott post office closed on October 31, 1898, but reopened as Mayday on September 4, 1913.) | La Plata | 81301 | May 05, 1876 | Nov 12, 1885 |
| Parrott | La Plata | 81301 | Jan 06, 1887 | Oct 31, 1898 |
| Parshall | Grand | 80468 | Nov 17, 1906 | open |
| Patches | Las Animas | | Jun 26, 1917 | Jul 14, 1928 |
| Patt | Las Animas | | Mar 11, 1919 | Feb 29, 1944 |
| Pauley | Huerfano | | Jan 06, 1920 | Jun 29, 1929 |
| Paulus | Jackson | | Dec 16, 1920 | Oct 31, 1933 |
| Pawnee (Note: Pawnee, Colorado, was commonly known as Union.) | Morgan | | Oct 26, 1903 | Jan 31, 1944 |
| Paxton | Montrose | | Nov 03, 1905 | Apr 15, 1907 |
| Paymaster | Montezuma | | Mar 20, 1900 | Jun 20, 1900 |
| Peaceful Valley | Boulder | 80540 | Jun 02, 1917 | Jun 29, 1935 |
| Peach Blow (Note: The Peach Blow, Colorado, post office was renamed Sloss on August 21, 1909.) | Eagle | | Nov 24, 1890 | Aug 21, 1909 |
| Pearl | Jackson | | Jan 19, 1889 | Aug 30, 1919 |
| Pearmont | Grand | | Apr 08, 1907 | Jul 31, 1918 |
| Peckham | Weld | 80645 | Aug 11, 1898 | Jun 15, 1911 |
| Peckham | Weld | 80645 | Jun 19, 1916 | Dec 31, 1931 |
| Peetz (Note: Peetz, Colorado, was previously known as Mercer.) | Logan | 80747 | Nov 20, 1908 | open |
| Pella | Grand | | Apr 05, 1871 | Nov 12, 1885 |
| Pemberton (Note: The Pemberton, Colorado, post office was renamed Westcreek on April 14, 1902.) | Douglas | 80135 | Jan 23, 1896 | Apr 14, 1902 |
| Peneold (Note: The Peneold, Colorado, post office was renamed Gould on June 1, 1937.) | Jackson | 80480 | Feb 02, 1937 | Jun 01, 1937 |
| Penn | Boulder | | Mar 06, 1882 | Jul 18, 1882 |
| Penrose (Note: The Glendale, Colorado, post office in Fremont County was renamed Penrose on May 8, 1909.) | Fremont | 81240 | May 08, 1909 | open |
| Peoria | Arapahoe | 80103 | Mar 03, 1906 | Jan 15, 1914 |
| Perigo | Gilpin | | Mar 02, 1895 | Jul 20, 1896 |
| Perigo | Gilpin | | Aug 27, 1897 | Mar 15, 1905 |
| Perin (Note: The Perin, Colorado, post office closed on March 24, 1903, but reopened as Perins on April 1, 1907.) | La Plata | | Apr 04, 1902 | Mar 24, 1903 |
| Perins | La Plata | | Apr 01, 1907 | Aug 15, 1922 |
| Perins | La Plata | | Oct 06, 1924 | Aug 14, 1926 |
| Perry | Douglas | | Jun 21, 1890 | Mar 23, 1895 |
| Perry | Rio Grande | | Dec 16, 1896 | Nov 16, 1898 |
| Perry Park | Douglas | 80118 | Mar 11, 1892 | Jan 31, 1906 |
| Pershing (Note: Pershing, Colorado, was previously known as Crater.) | Routt | | Jun 17, 1918 | Dec 31, 1942 |
| Petersburg | Arapahoe | | May 04, 1876 | Jul 16, 1877 |
| Petersburg | Arapahoe | | Jul 13, 1880 | Jul 14, 1905 |
| Petersburg | Arapahoe | | Oct 15, 1906 | Jun 12, 1907 |
| Petra (Note: The Petra, Colorado, post office was renamed Stout on September 4, 1882,) | Larimer | | May 17, 1882 | Sep 04, 1882 |
| Peyton | El Paso | 80831 | Feb 14, 1889 | open |
| Phillipsburg | Jefferson | 80127 | Jul 02, 1896 | Oct 22, 1896 |
| Phippsburg | Routt | 80469 | Mar 03, 1909 | open |
| Piceance | Rio Blanco | | Jun 25, 1892 | Aug 15, 1923 |
| Piceance | Rio Blanco | | Jan 10, 1924 | Apr 15, 1926 |
| Pictou | Huerfano | 81089 | Sep 12, 1889 | Oct 31, 1932 |
| Piedra | Archuleta | | May 16, 1879 | Jan 06, 1880 |
| Piedra | Archuleta | | Jan 27, 1880 | Jun 30, 1927 |
| Piedra | Hinsdale | 81147 | Jan 27, 1875 | Mar 24, 1878 |
| Pieplant | Gunnison | | Aug 24, 1904 | May 14, 1906 |
| Pierce | Weld | 80650 | Nov 04, 1903 | open |
| Pikeview | El Paso | 80919 | Aug 28, 1902 | Jul 31, 1957 |
| Pilot | Cheyenne | | Sep 11, 1899 | Dec 12, 1899 |
| Pilot | Cheyenne | | Jan 22, 1900 | Sep 30, 1903 |
| Pine (Note: From October 1, 1960 until July 22, 1961, the Pine, Colorado, post office served as a rural station of the Conifer post office.) | Jefferson | 80470 | Mar 28, 1882 | Dec 14, 1918 |
| Pine | Jefferson | 80470 | Apr 11, 1919 | Sep 30, 1960 |
| Pine | Jefferson | 80470 | Oct 01, 1960 | Jul 22, 1961 |
| Pine | Jefferson | 80470 | Jul 22, 1961 | open |
| Pine Bluff | Mesa | | Jun 06, 1913 | Dec 31, 1914 |
| Pine Grove | Douglas | 80134 | Dec 08, 1873 | Nov 07, 1877 |
| Pine Grove | Douglas | 80134 | Dec 18, 1877 | Mar 17, 1882 |
| Pine River (Note: The spelling of the Pine River, Colorado, post office was changed to Pineriver on April 14, 1894.) | La Plata | | Jul 15, 1878 | Apr 14, 1894 |
| Pinecliffe | Boulder; Gilpin | 80471 | Mar 08, 1909 | open |
| Pineriver | La Plata | | Apr 14, 1894 | Sep 12, 1895 |
| Pinewood | Larimer | | Feb 06, 1879 | Jun 30, 1921 |
| Pinkhamton | Larimer | | Oct 24, 1879 | Sep 15, 1904 |
| Pinnacle | Bent | | Apr 22, 1898 | Feb 14, 1911 |
| Pinnacle | Bent | | Mar 20, 1915 | Mar 13, 1926 |
| Pinnacle | Bent | | Mar 13, 1926 | Apr 15, 1949 |
| Pinneo | Washington | | Nov 15, 1883 | Feb 03, 1892 |
| Pinneo | Washington | | Feb 13, 1892 | Jul 09, 1895 |
| Pinneo | Washington | | Sep 23, 1896 | Dec 31, 1898 |
| Pinneo | Washington | | Jan 04, 1920 | Dec 05, 1931 |
| Piñon | Montrose | | Feb 21, 1896 | Jun 15, 1905 |
| Piñon | Pueblo | 81008 | Feb 21, 1907 | Jun 30, 1921 |
| Pitkin (Note: The Quartzville, Colorado, post office was renamed Pitkin on September 1, 1879.) | Gunnison | 81241 | Sep 01, 1879 | open |
| Pittsburgh | Gunnison | | Jul 22, 1881 | Dec 30, 1896 |
| Placerville | San Miguel | 81430 | Apr 22, 1878 | open |
| Placita | Pitkin | 81623 | Oct 25, 1899 | Dec 15, 1903 |
| Placita | Pitkin | 81623 | Oct 10, 1928 | Oct 31, 1934 |
| Plain (Note: The Lakeside, Colorado, post office in Summit County closed on September 20, 1886, but reopened as Plain on January 21, 1898.) | Summit | | Jan 21, 1898 | Aug 31, 1899 |
| Plains | Prowers | | Jan 11, 1908 | Feb 15, 1908 |
| Plains | Prowers | | Aug 22, 1911 | Aug 16, 1920 |
| Plains | Prowers | | Aug 30, 1920 | Mar 15, 1921 |
| Plainview | Jefferson | 80403 | Aug 26, 1909 | Aug 31, 1918 |
| Plainview | Jefferson | 80403 | Nov 21, 1918 | Apr 30, 1952 |
| Plateau | Mesa | | Nov 23, 1883 | Oct 27, 1887 |
| Plateau City (Note: The Eagalite, Colorado, post office was renamed Plateau City on August 26, 1901.) | Mesa | 81624 | Aug 26, 1901 | Dec 31, 1942 |
| Platner (Note: The Millet, Colorado, post office closed on December 27, 1890, but reopened as the Platner post office on June 15, 1892.) | Washington | 80743 | Jun 15, 1892 | Nov 19, 1903 |
| Platner | Washington | 80743 | Apr 07, 1909 | Mar 01, 1957 |
| Platoro | Conejos | 81120 | Mar 12, 1888 | May 15, 1895 |
| Platoro | Conejos | 81120 | Apr 09, 1898 | Apr 30, 1919 |
| Platte (Note: The name of the Platte Station, Colorado, post office was shortened to Platte on November 5, 1894, and then changed back to Platte Station 37 days later, and finally closed six days after that.) | Park | | Nov 05, 1894 | Dec 12, 1894 |
| Platte Cañon | Douglas | | Oct 11, 1877 | Dec 19, 1879 |
| Platte Cañon (Note: The Kassler, Colorado Territory, railroad station was established in 1872, and the Enterprise, Colorado, post office opened nearby on October 3, 1879. The Enterprise post office was renamed Platte Cañon on March 11, 1881, and closed on May 21, 1893. The town changed its name to Watertown in 1916. The site is now known as Waterton.) | Jefferson | 80127 | Mar 11, 1881 | May 21, 1893 |
| Platte Station | Park | | Sep 27, 1878 | Nov 05, 1894 |
| Platte Station | Park | | Dec 12, 1894 | Dec 18, 1894 |
| Platte Valley (Note: The Platte Valley, Colorado, post office was renamed Hardin on November 2, 1881.) | Weld | 80644 | Jan 31, 1876 | Nov 02, 1881 |
| Platteville (Note: The St. Vrain, Nebraska Territory, post office became the St. Vrain, Colorado Territory, post office on February 28, 1861, but was moved to Platteville on February 11, 1875.) | Weld | 80651 | Feb 11, 1875 | open |
| Pleasant Valley (Note: The Pleasant Valley, Colorado, post office was renamed Howard on July 26, 1882.) | Fremont | 81233 | Mar 19, 1877 | Jul 26, 1882 |
| Pleasant View | Montezuma | 81331 | Jun 23, 1939 | open |
| Plum Bush | Washington | | Aug 16, 1910 | Jun 15, 1918 |
| Plum Valley | Las Animas | | Jan 09, 1917 | Aug 15, 1935 |
| Plumer | Ouray | | May 28, 1900 | Dec 14, 1901 |
| Point Lookout | Montezuma | | Apr 22, 1939 | Jun 30, 1951 |
| Point of Rocks | Huerfano | | May 12, 1864 | May 16, 1865 |
| Poncha Springs (Note: The South Arkansas, Colorado, post office was renamed Poncho Springs on March 13, 1877, and was then renamed Poncha Springs on November 22, 1924.) | Chaffee | 81242 | Nov 22, 1924 | open |
| Poncho Springs | Chaffee | 81242 | Mar 13, 1877 | Sep 30, 1922 |
| Poncho Springs | Chaffee | 81242 | Mar 16, 1923 | Nov 22, 1924 |
| Pool (Note: The Pool, Colorado, post office was renamed Milner on January 22, 1920.) | Routt | 80487 | Mar 17, 1900 | Jan 22, 1920 |
| Porter | La Plata | | Oct 07, 1891 | Sep 15, 1908 |
| Portland | Fremont | 81226 | Mar 20, 1900 | Aug 31, 1952 |
| Portland | Ouray | 81226 | Jan 11, 1878 | Mar 25, 1896 |
| Portland | Ouray | 81226 | Mar 31, 1896 | Apr 24, 1896 |
| Poughkeepsie | San Juan | | Jan 12, 1880 | Aug 15, 1881 |
| Powderhorn | Gunnison | 81243 | Jan 12, 1880 | Apr 22, 1881 |
| Powderhorn | Gunnison | 81243 | May 18, 1881 | open |
| Powell | Las Animas | | Jun 04, 1883 | Jun 08, 1896 |
| Prairie | Washington | | Jul 07, 1910 | Aug 15, 1912 |
| Prairie | Washington | | Jan 30, 1916 | Mar 31, 1917 |
| Preston | Summit | | Jul 13, 1875 | Jan 18, 1884 |
| Preston | Summit | | Feb 11, 1884 | Dec 26, 1889 |
| Price | Archuleta | | Sep 27, 1880 | Aug 31, 1882 |
| Price Creek | Moffat | | May 28, 1912 | Jun 30, 1942 |
| Pride | Baca | | Dec 18, 1914 | Jun 15, 1920 |
| Primero | Las Animas | | Dec 11, 1901 | Apr 29, 1933 |
| Primos | Boulder | | May 17, 1907 | Feb 15, 1913 |
| Pritchett | Baca | 81064 | Mar 15, 1927 | open |
| Proctor | Logan | 80736 | Nov 21, 1908 | Dec 30, 1963 |
| Progress | Baca | | Sep 26, 1888 | Nov 19, 1895 |
| Prospect | Gunnison | | Nov 09, 1886 | Dec 24, 1890 |
| Providence | Gunnison | | May 17, 1898 | Mar 31, 1900 |
| Prowers | Bent | 81044 | Mar 11, 1881 | Aug 04, 1886 |
| Prowers | Bent | 81044 | Feb 24, 1891 | Jul 11, 1893 |
| Prowers | Bent | 81044 | May 20, 1898 | May 15, 1933 |
| Pruden | Saguache | | Mar 05, 1895 | Dec 31, 1900 |
| Pryor | Huerfano | 81089 | Feb 26, 1898 | Sep 14, 1996 |
| Pueblo | Pueblo | 81003; 81001-81002; 81004-81012 | Dec 13, 1860 | open |
| Pueblo West | Pueblo | 81007 | Oct 20, 1969 | open |
| Pulaski | Las Animas | | Jan 27, 1874 | Nov 02, 1886 |
| Pullen | Larimer | | May 15, 1888 | Jul 12, 1894 |
| Pultney | Crowley | 81062 | May 19, 1890 | Jun 11, 1890 |
| Puma (Note: The Trull, Colorado, post office was renamed Puma on April 17, 1896, but was then changed back to Trull on August 10, 1897.) | Routt | | Apr 17, 1896 | Aug 10, 1897 |
| Purcell | Weld | 80610 | Dec 23, 1911 | Apr 30, 1951 |
| Puzzler | Boulder | | May 10, 1898 | Nov 14, 1903 |
| Pyke | Saguache | | Nov 08, 1900 | Sep 15, 1902 |
| Pyramid | Rio Blanco | | Apr 24, 1896 | Oct 10, 1896 |
| Pyramid | Rio Blanco | | Nov 21, 1896 | Dec 15, 1932 |
| Pyrolite (Note: The Radiant, Colorado, post office was renamed Pyrolite on April 20, 1915, and was then renamed Kenwood on April 16, 1926.) | Fremont | | Apr 20, 1915 | Apr 16, 1926 |

== Q ==
Select the OpenStreetMap link at the right to view the location of some of the post offices in this section.

| Post office | Current county | ZIP Code | Date opened | Date closed |
|---|---|---|---|---|
| Quarry | Montezuma | | Jun 30, 1892 | Apr 30, 1912 |
| Quartz | Gunnison | | Aug 07, 1882 | Mar 29, 1886 |
| Quartzville | Gunnison | 81241 | Jun 09, 1879 | Sep 01, 1879 |
| Quebec | Huerfano | | Jul 13, 1880 | Feb 18, 1884 |
| Queen Beach | Kiowa | | Nov 09, 1908 | Sep 30, 1911 |
| Querida (Note: The Querida, Colorado, post office closed on May 14, 1906, but reopened as Bassick on May 19, 1917.) | Custer | | Jan 12, 1880 | Nov 29, 1887 |
| Querida | Custer | | Apr 29, 1891 | May 21, 1895 |
| Querida | Custer | | Aug 27, 1897 | May 14, 1906 |
| Quimby | Adams | 80229 | Oct 08, 1895 | Oct 20, 1900 |

== R ==
Select the OpenStreetMap link at the right to view the location of some of the post offices in this section.

| Post office | Current county | ZIP Code | Date opened | Date closed |
|---|---|---|---|---|
| Radiant | Fremont | | Dec 20, 1904 | Apr 20, 1915 |
| Radium | Grand | | Feb 09, 1906 | 1974 |
| Ragged Mountain | Gunnison | | Apr 11, 1919 | Mar 31, 1956 |
| Rago | Washington | | Mar 07, 1912 | Feb 28, 1951 |
| Ralston (Note: The Ralstons, Colorado Territory, post office closed on January 21, 1870, but reopened as Ralston on April 4, 1887.) | Jefferson | | Apr 04, 1887 | Oct 27, 1887 |
| Ralstons | Jefferson | | Mar 16, 1863 | Aug 31, 1866 |
| Ralstons | Jefferson | | Apr 11, 1867 | Jan 21, 1870 |
| Ramah (Note: The O.Z., Colorado, post office was moved to nearby Ramah on August 8, 1889.) | El Paso | 80832 | Aug 08, 1889 | open |
| Rand | Jackson | 80473 | Sep 03, 1883 | Nov 13, 1886 |
| Rand | Jackson | 80473 | Jun 02, 1887 | open |
| Rangely (Note: The spelling of the Rangly, Colorado, post office was changed to Rangely on September 10, 1885.) | Rio Blanco | 81648 | Sep 10, 1885 | open |
| Rangly | Rio Blanco | 81648 | Aug 26, 1884 | Sep 10, 1885 |
| Rapson | Las Animas | | Apr 04, 1911 | May 15, 1912 |
| Rapson | Las Animas | | Sep 12, 1913 | Jul 31, 1917 |
| Rapson | Las Animas | | Aug 10, 1920 | Oct 15, 1934 |
| Rathbone (Note: The Decatur, Colorado, post office closed on January 28, 1885, but reopened as Rathbone on September 19, 1891. The Rathbone post office closed on July 1, 1895, but reopened as the second Argentine post office on November 18, 1901.) | Summit | | Sep 19, 1891 | Jul 11, 1895 |
| Raton | Las Animas | | Jan 31, 1878 | Apr 19, 1881 |
| Rattlesnake Butte | Huerfano | | Apr 15, 1918 | Oct 31, 1938 |
| Raven | Garfield | | Aug 11, 1898 | Apr 29, 1939 |
| Ravens (Note: The Ravens, Colorado, post office was renamed Ravensbeque on May 21, 1886.) | Mesa | | Feb 05, 1885 | May 21, 1886 |
| Ravensbeque | Mesa | | May 21, 1886 | Mar 23, 1888 |
| Ravenwood | Huerfano | | Mar 04, 1910 | Mar 31, 1939 |
| Rawlings | Bent | | Apr 24, 1886 | Jul 07, 1887 |
| Raymer (Note: The Raymer, Colorado, post office operated from June 27, 1888, until May 14, 1895. On November 13, 1909, the New Raymer, Colorado, post office opened near the train station, about 640 feet (200 m) southwest of the original post office. The Town of Raymer, the State of Colorado, and the United States Census Bureau prefer the original name.) | Weld | 80742 | Jun 27, 1888 | May 14, 1895 |
| Read | Delta | 81416 | Apr 22, 1898 | Jan 31, 1934 |
| Red Cliff (Note: Red Cliff served as the original seat of Eagle County, Colorado since the county was created on February 11, 1883, until 1921. The spelling of the Red Cliff, Colorado, post office was changed to Redcliff on February 7, 1895, but was then changed back to Red Cliff on April 2, 1979.) | Eagle | 81649 | Feb 04, 1880 | Feb 07, 1895 |
| Red Cliff | Eagle | 81649 | Apr 02, 1979 | open |
| Red Elephant (Note: The name of the Red Elephant, Colorado, post office was shortened to Elephant on April 22, 1881.) | Clear Creek | | Dec 19, 1878 | Apr 22, 1881 |
| Red Feather Lakes | Larimer | 80545 | Jul 02, 1924 | Jan 31, 1925 |
| Red Feather Lakes | Larimer | 80545 | Aug 04, 1926 | open |
| Red Lion | Logan | | Nov 19, 1886 | May 13, 1887 |
| Red Lion | Logan | | May 07, 1888 | Sep 19, 1890 |
| Red Lion | Logan | | Jun 20, 1910 | Nov 30, 1935 |
| Red Mesa | La Plata | | Apr 24, 1907 | Nov 30, 1954 |
| Red Mountain | Grand | | Apr 08, 1878 | Sep 05, 1878 |
| Red Mountain | Gunnison | | Dec 13, 1880 | Nov 07, 1881 |
| Red Mountain (Note: The mining town of Red Mountain in Ouray County, Colorado, was more commonly known as Red Mountain Town.) | Ouray | | Jan 29, 1883 | Mar 16, 1895 |
| Red Mountain | Ouray | | Apr 27, 1896 | Feb 28, 1913 |
| Redcliff | Eagle | 81649 | Feb 07, 1895 | Apr 01, 1979 |
| Redstone | Pitkin | 81623 | May 19, 1898 | Sep 30, 1918 |
| Redstone | Pitkin | 81623 | May 16, 1925 | Feb 15, 1943 |
| Redstone | Pitkin | 81623 | Jun 01, 1959 | Aug 01, 1962 |
| Redvale | Montrose | 81431 | Dec 01, 1909 | open |
| Redwing | Huerfano | 81089 | May 22, 1914 | Sep 24, 1965 |
| Regnier (Note: In 1920, the Regnier, Colorado, post office in Baca County was replaced by a Regnier, Oklahoma post office across the stateline in Cimarron County, Oklahoma.) | Baca | 81064 | Sep 25, 1900 | 1920 |
| Renaraye | Montezuma | | Jul 10, 1915 | Jan 15, 1929 |
| Rene | Otero | | Feb 16, 1912 | Sep 30, 1921 |
| Resort | Elbert | | Jul 26, 1890 | Jan 15, 1914 |
| Resort (Note: The Resort, Colorado, post office was renamed Vermillion on January 3, 1881, but then changed back to Resort on June 3, 1881. The Resort Post Office closed on May 11, 1886, but reopened as Dawson on June 9, 1890. The Dawson Post Office closed on June 30, 1894, but reopened as Foxton on January 21, 1909.) | Jefferson | 80433 | Jan 15, 1880 | Jan 03, 1881 |
| Resort | Jefferson | 80433 | Aug 05, 1881 | May 11, 1886 |
| Rexford (Note: Located at an elevation of 11,431 feet (3,484 m), the Rexford, Colorado, post office was the highest elevation U.S. post office from its opening on January 9, 1882, until its closing on November 10, 1883.) (Note: Since their GNIS elevations only differ by 3 feet (0.9 m), both Rexford, Colorado, and Holy Cross, Colorado, had legitimate claims to the highest elevation U.S. post office from January 23, 1882, to November 10, 1883.) | Summit | 80424 | Jan 09, 1882 | Nov 10, 1883 |
| Rhone (Note: The spelling of the Roan, Colorado, post office was changed to Rhone on September 11, 1894.) | Mesa | 81521 | Sep 11, 1894 | Dec 15, 1904 |
| Richards | Baca | | Jan 27, 1912 | Feb 28, 1938 |
| Rico (Note: Rico served as the original seat of Dolores County, Colorado, from March 4, 1881, until 1945.) | Dolores | 81332 | Aug 25, 1879 | open |
| Ridge | Jefferson | 80002 | Jul 03, 1912 | Jun 30, 1954 |
| Ridgway | Ouray | 81432 | Oct 01, 1890 | open |
| Rifle | Garfield | 81650 | Apr 23, 1884 | open |
| Riland | Garfield | | Sep 24, 1913 | Nov 26, 1946 |
| Rinn | Weld | 80504 | Jun 22, 1901 | Jan 02, 1907 |
| Rio Blanco (Note: The spelling of the Rioblanco, Colorado, post office was changed to Rio Blanco on July 1, 1950.) | Rio Blanco | 81650 | Jul 01, 1950 | May 23, 1975 |
| Rio Grande | Alamosa | | Mar 13, 1874 | Apr 18, 1877 |
| Rioblanco | Rio Blanco | 81650 | May 06, 1899 | Jul 01, 1950 |
| Rito Alto | Saguache | | Feb 07, 1872 | Feb 18, 1884 |
| Rivas | Moffat | | Jul 26, 1924 | Sep 30, 1925 |
| River Bend | Elbert | | Jan 04, 1875 | Jan 31, 1939 |
| River Portal | Montrose | | Jan 09, 1906 | May 14, 1910 |
| Riverside | Chaffee | 81211 | May 22, 1872 | Jun 19, 1905 |
| Roach | Jackson | | Dec 28, 1929 | Dec 31, 1941 |
| Roan | Mesa | 81521 | Aug 09, 1893 | Sep 11, 1894 |
| Roaring Fork | Pitkin | | Apr 13, 1880 | Jul 29, 1880 |
| Robb | Yuma | 80758 | Dec 21, 1889 | Oct 27, 1893 |
| Robb | Yuma | 80758 | Apr 13, 1920 | Nov 15, 1920 |
| Robinson (Note: The Ten Mile, Colorado, post office was renamed Robinson on February 17, 1881.) | Summit | | Feb 17, 1881 | Jan 08, 1883 |
| Robinson | Summit | | Jan 09, 1883 | Feb 28, 1911 |
| Roby (Note: The Roby, Colorado, post office was renamed Model on October 26, 1912.) | Las Animas | 81059 | Nov 06, 1911 | Oct 26, 1912 |
| Rock Butte | Elbert | | Sep 20, 1869 | Oct 03, 1871 |
| Rock Butte | Elbert | | Jan 17, 1872 | Oct 22, 1874 |
| Rock Cliff | Saguache | | Aug 10, 1874 | Jul 29, 1880 |
| Rock Creek | Pueblo | | May 11, 1909 | Apr 30, 1915 |
| Rock Ridge (Note: The Virginia, Colorado Territory, post office in Douglas County was renamed Frosts Ranch on February 8, 1871, and was then renamed Rock Ridge on February 13, 1872.) | Douglas | | Feb 13, 1872 | Mar 22, 1892 |
| Rockdale (Note: The Rockdale, Colorado, post office was renamed Rockvale on April 12, 1882.) | Fremont | 81244 | Mar 17, 1882 | Apr 12, 1882 |
| Rockland (Note: The Rockland, Colorado, post office in Huerfano County was renamed Solar on May 20, 1915.) | Huerfano | | Dec 19, 1914 | May 20, 1915 |
| Rockland | Logan | 80731 | Apr 23, 1888 | Feb 04, 1891 |
| Rockvale | Fremont | 81244 | Apr 12, 1882 | open |
| Rockville (Note: The Rockville, Colorado, post office closed on May 7, 1878, but reopened as Rowena on March 16, 1894.) | Boulder | 80455 | Jul 16, 1877 | May 07, 1878 |
| Rockwood | La Plata | 81301 | Jul 08, 1878 | Jul 15, 1895 |
| Rockwood | La Plata | 81301 | Nov 08, 1878 | Apr 14, 1917 |
| Rockwood | La Plata | 81301 | Apr 20, 1923 | Feb 15, 1940 |
| Rocky | Mesa | | Aug 12, 1905 | Nov 25, 1905 |
| Rocky | Park | | Dec 23, 1874 | Oct 31, 1898 |
| Rocky Ford | Otero | 81067 | Dec 01, 1871 | open |
| Rodley | Baca | | May 21, 1910 | Sep 30, 1937 |
| Rogers | Yuma | | May 24, 1886 | Sep 21, 1888 |
| Rogersville | Ouray | | Mar 19, 1883 | Jun 15, 1883 |
| Roggen | Weld | 80652 | Nov 15, 1883 | open |
| Rollinsville | Gilpin | 80474 | Jan 31, 1871 | open |
| Romeo | Conejos | 81148 | Jul 24, 1901 | Sep 10, 1908 |
| Romeo | Conejos | 81148 | Sep 14, 1908 | open |
| Romley | Chaffee | | Jan 15, 1886 | Oct 18, 1893 |
| Romley | Chaffee | | Jun 19, 1914 | Aug 30, 1919 |
| Romley | Chaffee | | Feb 09, 1920 | Oct 30, 1924 |
| Rosa | El Paso | | Jan 11, 1895 | May 07, 1895 |
| Rosemont | Teller | | Mar 31, 1903 | Nov 15, 1926 |
| Roses Cabin | Hinsdale | | Jun 27, 1878 | Sep 19, 1887 |
| Rosita | Custer | 81252 | Jul 08, 1874 | Dec 02, 1966 |
| Roswell | El Paso | 80907 | Feb 01, 1889 | Apr 30, 1908 |
| Roubideau | Delta | | Feb 27, 1909 | Jul 15, 1918 |
| Roudebush (Note: The Roudebush, Colorado, post office was renamed Mitchell on April 2, 1883.) | Eagle | | Dec 15, 1880 | Apr 02, 1883 |
| Round Oak | Huerfano | | Mar 16, 1908 | Jul 30, 1910 |
| Rouse | Huerfano | 81089 | Jan 02, 1889 | Nov 30, 1929 |
| Routt | Moffat | | Feb 14, 1930 | Mar 31, 1953 |
| Routt | Routt | | Oct 03, 1884 | Jan 11, 1887 |
| Routt | Routt | | Apr 23, 1888 | Sep 11, 1889 |
| Routt | Routt | | Nov 25, 1890 | Mar 22, 1892 |
| Rowe | Prowers | | Nov 30, 1898 | Sep 29, 1900 |
| Rowena | Boulder | 80455 | Mar 16, 1894 | May 31, 1911 |
| Rowena | Boulder | 80455 | Aug 05, 1911 | Jul 31, 1918 |
| Royal Gorge | Fremont | 81212 | Jul 21, 1949 | Apr 30, 1966 |
| Ruby | Gunnison | 81434 | Oct 31, 1879 | Jan 08, 1880 |
| Ruby | Gunnison | 81434 | Nov 01, 1893 | Apr 27, 1895 |
| Ruby City | Ouray | | May 17, 1878 | Jul 31, 1879 |
| Ruction | Jackson | | Aug 01, 1889 | Sep 16, 1889 |
| Rudolph | Montrose | | Jan 27, 1886 | Jun 23, 1886 |
| Ruedi | Eagle | | Aug 06, 1889 | Nov 15, 1941 |
| Ruff | Baca | | Sep 16, 1889 | May 18, 1896 |
| Rugby | Las Animas | 81020 | Mar 16, 1900 | Jan 31, 1947 |
| Ruin Canyon | Montezuma | | Sep 03, 1920 | Jul 31, 1928 |
| Rule | Bent | | Mar 12, 1909 | Jun 30, 1921 |
| Running Creek | Elbert | | Apr 14, 1868 | Jun 26, 1876 |
| Running Creek | Elbert | | Oct 04, 1876 | Mar 12, 1883 |
| Rush | El Paso | 80833 | Feb 15, 1908 | open |
| Russell (Note: Russell, Colorado, was also known as Placer.) | Costilla | 81133 | May 12, 1876 | Apr 30, 1904 |
| Russell | Costilla | 81133 | Oct 11, 1904 | Jul 31, 1931 |
| Russell | Costilla | 81133 | May 04, 1936 | Jul 31, 1956 |
| Russell Gulch | Gilpin | 80427 | Sep 29, 1879 | May 31, 1943 |
| Russellville | Douglas | | May 22, 1862 | Sep 08, 1862 |
| Rustic | Larimer | 80512 | Oct 18, 1880 | Oct 31, 1887 |
| Rye | Pueblo | 81069 | Mar 07, 1881 | open |

== S ==
Select the OpenStreetMap link at the right to view the location of some of the post offices in this section.

| Post office | Current county | ZIP Code | Date opened | Date closed |
|---|---|---|---|---|
| Sage | Gunnison | | Nov 22, 1880 | Sep 18, 1882 |
| Sago | Montezuma | | Jul 20, 1922 | Dec 15, 1925 |
| Saguache (Note: The name "Saguache" is pronounced /səˈwætʃ/. This name comes from the Ute language noun "sawup" /səˈwʌp/ meaning "sand dunes". The Spanish language version of this name is usually spelled "Saguache", while the English language version is usually spelled "Sawatch".) | Saguache | 81149 | Apr 01, 1867 | open |
| Saint Charles | Pueblo | | May 28, 1866 | Jul 11, 1876 |
| Saint Charles | Pueblo | | Sep 26, 1876 | Jan 03, 1881 |
| Saint Cloud (Note: The Saint Cloud, Colorado, post office was renamed Cherokee Park on February 14, 1913.) | Larimer | 80536 | May 09, 1884 | Feb 14, 1913 |
| Saint Elmo | Chaffee | | Jun 23, 1880 | Oct 15, 1952 |
| Saint Kevin | Lake | | Jan 15, 1886 | Dec 24, 1890 |
| Saint Marys | Huerfano | | Aug 07, 1867 | Nov 18, 1872 |
| Saint Marys | Huerfano | | May 05, 1876 | Jul 21, 1889 |
| Saint Marys | Huerfano | | Jul 06, 1891 | Dec 31, 1907 |
| Saint Peter | El Paso | | Nov 14, 1905 | Dec 31, 1907 |
| St. Vrain (Note: On January 18, 1859, the United States Post Office Department authorized the first three post offices in the Pike's Peak gold region: Auraria, Kansas Territory; Montana, Kansas Territory; and St. Vrain, Nebraska Territory.) (Note: St. Vrain was the original seat of St. Vrain's County, Jefferson Territory, from November 28, 1859, until June 6, 1861, and then Weld County, Colorado Territory, from November 1, 1861 until 1868.) | Weld | 80651 | Jan 18, 1859 | Feb 11, 1875 |
| Saint Vrains | Weld | 80516 | Sep 30, 1915 | Mar 15, 1918 |
| Saints John | Summit | | Aug 08, 1876 | Feb 01, 1881 |
| Salem | Arapahoe | | Aug 28, 1894 | Jan 15, 1919 |
| Salida (Note: The Arkansas, Colorado, post office was renamed Salida on March 28, 1881.) | Chaffee | 81201, 81227 | Mar 28, 1881 | open |
| Salina | Boulder | 80302 | Nov 19, 1874 | Jan 01, 1925 |
| Salt Creek | Pueblo | 81006 | Oct 05, 1880 | Oct 26, 1893 |
| Salt Creek | Pueblo | 81006 | May 25, 1904 | May 31, 1908 |
| Sams (Note: The Leopard, Colorado, post office closed on April 6, 1892, but reopened as Sams on May 7, 1903.) | San Miguel | 81430 | Apr 18, 1903 | May 05, 1903 |
| Sams | San Miguel | 81430 | May 07, 1903 | Dec 31, 1919 |
| Sams | San Miguel | 81430 | Jul 27, 1927 | Aug 24, 1950 |
| San Acacio | Costilla | 81151 | Nov 11, 1909 | Apr 18, 1992 |
| San Antonia (Note: The Apishapa, Colorado Territory, post office closed on May 24, 1875. A new post office opened at nearby San Antonia on July 21, 1875, but it was moved and renamed Apishapa on August 7, 1876. The Apishapa post office was renamed Augusta on September 27, 1911.) | Las Animas | | Jul 21, 1875 | Aug 07, 1876 |
| San Antonio (Note: The San Antonio, Colorado, post office was moved to Antonito on January 24, 1881.) | Conejos | 81120 | Nov 26, 1880 | Jan 24, 1881 |
| San Bernardo (Note: The Trout Lake, Colorado, post office was renamed San Bernardo on June 29, 1892.) | San Miguel | | Jun 29, 1892 | Nov 20, 1905 |
| San Bernardo | San Miguel | | Jan 29, 1907 | Apr 07, 1907 |
| San Isabel | Custer | 81069 | Jun 18, 1936 | Dec 31, 1938 |
| San Isabel | Saguache | | Feb 07, 1872 | May 15, 1912 |
| San Jose (Note: The San Jose, Colorado, post office was renamed Grinnell on December 18, 1878.) | Las Animas | | Oct 06, 1873 | Dec 18, 1878 |
| San Juan (Note: San Juan City served as the original seat of Hinsdale County, Colorado Territory, from February 10, 1874, when the county was created, until February 23, 1875. On June 4, 1874, San Juan City officially shortened its name to San Juan, although it was still commonly known as San Juan City. San Juan City became a part of Mineral County when the new county was created on March 27, 1893.) | Mineral | | Jun 24, 1874 | Mar 18, 1895 |
| San Juan | Mineral | | Feb 28, 1900 | May 14, 1904 |
| San Juan | Mineral | | Jul 05, 1922 | Mar 08, 1923 |
| San Luis (Note: Initially named San Luis de la Culebra upon its dedication on June 21, 1851, in the Territorio de Nuevo México (New Mexico Territory). San Luis is the oldest continuously occupied town in Colorado.) | Costilla | 81152 | Feb 25, 1862 | open |
| San Miguel | San Miguel | 80435 | Jul 16, 1877 | Sep 19, 1895 |
| San Miguel | Taos County, NM | 87524 | Nov 13, 1862 | Oct 21, 1872 |
| San Pablo | Costilla | 81152 | Jan 07, 1893 | Jul 17, 1993 |
| San Pedro (Note: The San Pedro, Colorado, post office was renamed Starkville on May 23, 1879.) | Las Animas | 81082 | Jan 31, 1879 | May 23, 1879 |
| San Rafael | Conejos | 81120 | May 17, 1890 | Jan 24, 1895 |
| Sanatorium (Note: The Sanatorium, Colorado, post office was renamed Spivak on September 1, 1928.) | Jefferson | 80214 | Mar 09, 1923 | Sep 01, 1928 |
| Sanborn | Lincoln | | May 17, 1878 | Jun 03, 1905 |
| Sand Arroyo | Baca | | Oct 20, 1915 | Dec 31, 1917 |
| Sanford (Note: The Ephraim, Colorado, post office was moved about a half-mile (800 m) and renamed Sanford on June 2, 1888.) | Conejos | 81151 | Jun 02, 1888 | Feb 06, 1889 |
| Sanford | Conejos | 81151 | Apr 09, 1889 | open |
| Sangre de Cristo | Saguache | | Apr 19, 1876 | Feb 28, 1884 |
| Santa Clara | Huerfano | | Dec 17, 1873 | Jun 04, 1875 |
| Santa Clara | Huerfano | | Oct 21, 1875 | May 21, 1883 |
| Santa Clara | Huerfano | | Sep 16, 1889 | Jul 18, 1894 |
| Sapinero | Gunnison | 81230 | Nov 23, 1882 | Nov 24, 1988 |
| Sargents (Note: The Marshalltown, Colorado, post office was renamed Sargents on January 26, 1882.) | Saguache | 81248 | Jan 26, 1882 | open |
| Sarinda | Logan | | Jul 28, 1875 | Feb 07, 1882 |
| Satank | Garfield | 81623 | Jun 27, 1882 | Jul 14, 1904 |
| Saugus | Lincoln | | Jan 04, 1908 | Jan 31, 1914 |
| Sawpit (Note: The Seymour, Colorado, post office was renamed Sawpit on February 21, 1896.) | San Miguel | 81430 | Feb 21, 1896 | Mar 31, 1926 |
| Schistos | Saguache | | Oct 30, 1894 | May 07, 1895 |
| Schley (Note: The Clemmons, Colorado, post office closed on October 31, 1898, but reopened as Schley on June 27, 1899.) | Elbert | | Jun 27, 1899 | Oct 15, 1913 |
| Schlueter | Washington | | Sep 10, 1912 | Jul 31, 1913 |
| Scholl | Grand | | Nov 27, 1901 | Jan 31, 1930 |
| Schramm | Yuma | 80759 | Apr 11, 1913 | May 16, 1914 |
| Schramm | Yuma | 80759 | Jul 13, 1922 | Dec 31, 1925 |
| Scissors (Note: The Scissors, Colorado, post office was renamed Capps on September 26, 1894.) | Huerfano | | Feb 18, 1884 | Sep 26, 1894 |
| Scofield | Gunnison | | Sep 20, 1880 | Nov 19, 1886 |
| Scranton | Adams | | Aug 12, 1887 | Jul 25, 1888 |
| Sedalia | Douglas | 80135 | Apr 08, 1872 | open |
| Sedgewick | Saguache | | Aug 23, 1880 | Jan 12, 1885 |
| Sedgwick (Note: The Henderson, Colorado, post office in Sedgwick County was renamed Sedgwick on September 10, 1885.) | Sedgwick | 80749 | Sep 10, 1885 | May 11, 1894 |
| Sedgwick | Sedgwick | 80749 | Apr 30, 1896 | open |
| Seebarsee (Note: The Laird, Colorado, post office was renamed Seebarsee on February 17, 1892, but reverted to Laird on January 25, 1899.) | Yuma | 80758 | Feb 17, 1892 | Jan 25, 1899 |
| Segreganset | Kiowa | | Jul 07, 1914 | Jul 31, 1917 |
| Segundo | Las Animas | 81082 | Jul 17, 1901 | Jun 05, 1993 |
| Seguro | Huerfano | | Jan 04, 1895 | Sep 14, 1901 |
| Seibert | Kit Carson | 80834 | Oct 17, 1888 | open |
| Selak | Grand | | Jun 11, 1883 | Sep 29, 1893 |
| Sellar | Pitkin | | Apr 12, 1888 | Dec 17, 1896 |
| Sellar | Pitkin | | Dec 30, 1896 | Jul 05, 1898 |
| Sellar | Pitkin | | Jan 25, 1901 | Apr 15, 1901 |
| Sellar | Pitkin | | May 22, 1902 | Aug 14, 1909 |
| Sellar | Pitkin | | May 11, 1910 | Aug 10, 1918 |
| Semper | Jefferson | 80003 | Dec 28, 1882 | Aug 31, 1900 |
| Serene | Weld | | Jan 25, 1923 | Aug 31, 1942 |
| Seton (Note: The Seton, Colorado, post office was renamed Setonsburg on January 22, 1916.) | Baca | | Jun 03, 1915 | Jan 22, 1916 |
| Setonsburg | Baca | | Jan 22, 1916 | May 31, 1920 |
| Seven Castles | Eagle | | Dec 11, 1913 | Aug 10, 1918 |
| Severance (Note: The Severance, Colorado, post office opened on March 8, 1894, in the town of Tailholt.) | Weld | 80546 | Mar 08, 1894 | Nov 10, 1896 |
| Severance | Weld | 80546 | Jan 20, 1897 | Jun 30, 1902 |
| Severance | Weld | 80546 | Sep 18, 1907 | open |
| Seward (Note: The Seward, Colorado, post office was renamed Clyde on October 12, 1899.) | Teller | | Aug 06, 1896 | Oct 12, 1899 |
| Seymour | San Miguel | 81430 | Jul 13, 1892 | Feb 21, 1896 |
| Sharpsdale | Huerfano | | Nov 23, 1883 | Oct 19, 1894 |
| Sharpsdale | Huerfano | | Feb 12, 1895 | Jun 30, 1913 |
| Sharpsdale | Huerfano | | Aug 01, 1914 | Jun 15, 1934 |
| Shavano (1880) | Chaffee | | Aug 04, 1880 | Nov 30, 1880 |
| Shavano (1930) | Chaffee | | Jan 04, 1930 | Sep 20, 1930 |
| Shaw | Lincoln | | Feb 24, 1908 | Nov 30, 1955 |
| Shawnee (Note: The Fairville, Colorado, post office was renamed Slaghts on February 23, 1882, and was then moved about a half-mile (800 m) and renamed Shawnee on April 19, 1900.) | Park | 80475 | Apr 19, 1900 | open |
| Sheephorn | Eagle | 80423 | Jan 17, 1895 | Dec 31, 1951 |
| Sheffield (Note: The Sheffield, Colorado, post office was renamed Denver Mills on January 20, 1892.) | Denver | | Feb 25, 1891 | Jan 20, 1892 |
| Shelton | Boulder | | May 13, 1904 | Sep 23, 1904 |
| Shenandoah | Montrose | | Apr 29, 1892 | Jul 25, 1893 |
| Shenandoah | Montrose | | Aug 26, 1893 | Jul 17, 1896 |
| Sheridan | Arapahoe | 80110 | | |
| Sheridan Lake (Note: The Bee, Colorado, post office was renamed Sheridan Lake on October 27, 1887.) | Kiowa | 81071 | Sep 20, 1887 | Oct 15, 1887 |
| Sheridan Lake | Kiowa | 81071 | Oct 27, 1887 | open |
| Sherman | Eagle | | Jun 30, 1890 | Jul 05, 1892 |
| Sherman | Hinsdale | | Jun 19, 1877 | Nov 13, 1886 |
| Sherman | Hinsdale | | May 16, 1895 | Apr 05, 1898 |
| Sherrod | Gunnison | | Jul 18, 1904 | Apr 30, 1906 |
| Shields | Yuma | | Aug 06, 1887 | Aug 24, 1889 |
| Shields | Yuma | | Jul 28, 1890 | Sep 22, 1894 |
| Shirley | Saguache | | May 31, 1881 | May 11, 1882 |
| Shistos | Saguache | | 1894 | 1895 |
| Shoshone | Garfield | | Sep 03, 1907 | Jun 30, 1910 |
| Sidney | Pitkin | | Jan 04, 1881 | Mar 20, 1882 |
| Sidney | Routt | | Aug 10, 1888 | Mar 15, 1907 |
| Sidney | Routt | | Aug 31, 1907 | Dec 04, 1941 |
| Sigman | Adams | | Jun 25, 1926 | Jan 31, 1935 |
| Signal | El Paso | | May 01, 1896 | May 23, 1898 |
| Sillsville | Gunnison | 81230 | Nov 07, 1903 | Oct 15, 1907 |
| Sillsville | Gunnison | 81230 | Feb 17, 1908 | Jun 15, 1910 |
| Siloam | Pueblo | | Mar 31, 1891 | Apr 30, 1943 |
| Silt | Garfield | 81652 | Oct 27, 1898 | open |
| Silver Cliff | Custer | 81252 | Oct 30, 1878 | open |
| Silver Lake | Summit | | Nov 22, 1862 | Jan 15, 1864 |
| Silver Ledge | San Juan | | Sep 06, 1904 | Mar 30, 1905 |
| Silver Park | Custer | | Jul 28, 1879 | Feb 02, 1881 |
| Silver Plume (Note: The spelling of the Silver Plume, Colorado, post office was changed to Silverplume in January 1896, but was later changed back to Silver Plume.) | Clear Creek | 80476 | Dec 01, 1875 | Jan 1896 |
| Silver Plume | Clear Creek | 80476 | NA | open |
| Silverdale | Chaffee | | Jan 23, 1882 | May 25, 1882 |
| Silverplume | Clear Creek | 80476 | Jan 1896 | NA |
| Silverthorne | Summit | 80498, 80497 | Jan 01, 1962 | open |
| Silverton | San Juan | 81433 | Feb 01, 1875 | open |
| Simla | Elbert | 80835 | Aug 12, 1909 | open |
| Simpson | Adams | | Jun 24, 1910 | Aug 31, 1943 |
| Sinbad | Montrose | | Dec 19, 1914 | Jan 14, 1933 |
| Sitton | Pueblo | | Dec 22, 1906 | Aug 31, 1917 |
| Skinner | Fremont | | Feb 20, 1897 | Feb 01, 1899 |
| Skull Creek | Moffat | | Feb 08, 1929 | Sep 01, 1949 |
| Skyway | Mesa | | Jun 04, 1927 | Jun 30, 1945 |
| Slaghts | Park | 80475 | Feb 23, 1882 | Apr 19, 1900 |
| Slater (Note: On December 24, 1888, the Slater, Wyoming Territory, post office moved across the stateline and was renamed Slater, Colorado.) | Moffat | 81653 | Dec 24, 1888 | open |
| Slick Rock (Note: The Gladel, Colorado, post office closed on May 31, 1929, but reopened as the Slick Rock post office on May 1, 1941.) | San Miguel | 81325 | May 01, 1941 | Jun 30, 1946 |
| Slick Rock | San Miguel | 81325 | Aug 10, 1957 | open |
| Sligo | Weld | | Oct 27, 1908 | Aug 31, 1941 |
| Sloss | Eagle | | Aug 21, 1909 | Jul 31, 1931 |
| Smith Canyon | Las Animas | | Jun 30, 1892 | Sep 28, 1892 |
| Smith Canyon | Las Animas | | Sep 29, 1892 | Oct 23, 1893 |
| Smuggler | San Miguel | | Apr 06, 1895 | Dec 05, 1928 |
| Sneffels (Note: The name of the Mount Sneffels, Colorado, post office was shortened to Sneffels on April 3, 1895.) | Ouray | | Apr 03, 1895 | Oct 06, 1930 |
| Snipes (Note: The Molina, Colorado, post office closed on September 1, 1896, but reopened as the Snipes post office on January 9, 1897. The Snipes post office was then renamed Molina on May 3, 1906.) | Mesa | 81646 | Jan 09, 1897 | May 03, 1906 |
| Snowden (Note: The Hope, Colorado, post office in Lake County was renamed Snowden on November 24, 1890.) | Lake | | Nov 24, 1890 | Aug 31, 1893 |
| Snowmass | Gunnison | | Jul 21, 1882 | Aug 13, 1883 |
| Snowmass | Pitkin | 81654 | Feb 19, 1901 | Apr 14, 1904 |
| Snowmass | Pitkin | 81654 | Oct 07, 1904 | Jan 31, 1914 |
| Snowmass | Pitkin | 81654 | Apr 08, 1901 | open |
| Snowmass Village | Pitkin | 81615 | | |
| Snyder | Morgan | 80750 | Jun 16, 1882 | open |
| Soda Springs | Lake | | Aug 25, 1879 | Oct 31, 1902 |
| Solar | Huerfano | | May 20, 1915 | Nov 10, 1926 |
| Somerset | Gunnison | 81434 | Mar 19, 1903 | open |
| Sopris | Las Animas | 81082 | Jul 25, 1888 | Jan 02, 1969 |
| Sorrento | Cheyenne | | Jul 29, 1907 | Feb 14, 1918 |
| South Arkansas | Chaffee | 81242 | Apr 22, 1868 | Mar 13, 1877 |
| South Boulder | Gilpin | | Dec 14, 1865 | Nov 22, 1869 |
| South Cañon | Garfield | | Aug 21, 1905 | Sep 30, 1916 |
| South Denver (Note: The South Denver, Colorado, post office closed on May 13, 1896, but was reestablished as Station A of the Denver post office on August 1, 1899.)] (Note: The City of Denver annexed the Town of South Denver on February 7, 1894.) | Denver | 80209-80210 | Nov 20, 1889 | May 13, 1896 |
| South Fork | Rio Grande | 81154 | Feb 10, 1876 | May 23, 1883 |
| South Fork | Rio Grande | 81154 | May 05, 1892 | Sep 09, 1909 |
| South Fork | Rio Grande | 81154 | Nov 09, 1910 | open |
| South Park | Park | | Jun 18, 1874 | Jun 24, 1879 |
| South Platte (Note: The Symes, Colorado, post office was renamed South Platte on January 31, 1899.) | Jefferson | 80135 | Jan 31, 1899 | Sep 15, 1937 |
| South Platte | Logan | | Jun 20, 1873 | Jan 09, 1883 |
| South Pueblo | Pueblo | 81004 | Aug 26, 1874 | Jun 04, 1887 |
| South Side | Otero | | Feb 22, 1869 | Sep 12, 1877 |
| Southwater | El Paso | | Jan 04, 1872 | Oct 01, 1878 |
| Spanish | Saguache | | May 25, 1898 | Nov 21, 1898 |
| Spanish Bar (Note: Spanish Bar, Colorado, was later known as Fall River.) | Clear Creek | | Dec 13, 1860 | Jul 09, 1885 |
| Spanish Peak (Note: The Spanish Peak, Colorado, post office was renamed La Veta on August 17, 1876.) | Huerfano | 81055 | Jun 15, 1871 | Aug 17, 1876 |
| Spanish Peaks | Huerfano | | Apr 21, 1920 | Oct 30, 1920 |
| Spar (Note: Spar, Colorado, was commonly known as Spar City.) | Mineral | 81130 | Aug 16, 1892 | Aug 23, 1895 |
| Spargo | Montezuma | | Nov 17, 1920 | Feb 29, 1924 |
| Sparkill (Note: The Sparkill, Colorado, post office was located at the town of Independence.) | Pitkin | | Feb 01, 1882 | Oct 18, 1887 |
| Sparks | Moffat | | Nov 26, 1913 | Aug 15, 1914 |
| Sparrow | Pueblo | | Oct 18, 1883 | Dec 23, 1885 |
| Spence | Washington | | Aug 20, 1910 | Jan 31, 1920 |
| Spencer | Gunnison | | Sep 10, 1894 | Jul 31, 1905 |
| Spencer | Gunnison | | Dec 14, 1905 | Sep 14, 1907 |
| Sperryvale | Pueblo | | Jan 05, 1901 | Apr 15, 1901 |
| Spicer | Jackson | | Apr 29, 1884 | Jun 30, 1954 |
| Spinney | Park | | Feb 14, 1889 | Aug 31, 1904 |
| Spinney | Park | | Feb 04, 1908 | Sep 01, 1908 |
| Spivak | Jefferson | 80214 | Sep 01, 1928 | Jun 30, 1967 |
| Spring | Gunnison | | Apr 19, 1881 | Oct 31, 1881 |
| Spring Gulch (Note: The name of the Spring Gulch, Colorado, post office was shortened to Gulch on April 19, 1895.) | Pitkin | | Sep 10, 1891 | Apr 19, 1895 |
| Spring Valley | Douglas | | Mar 27, 1865 | Jul 31, 1885 |
| Springdale | Boulder | 80302 | May 03, 1881 | Jul 05, 1911 |
| Springer | Park | | Aug 23, 1901 | Jan 10, 1902 |
| Springer | Park | | Jun 02, 1902 | Oct 15, 1902 |
| Springfield | Baca | 81073 | Jun 02, 1887 | open |
| Springvale | Las Animas | | Jul 21, 1874 | Nov 09, 1875 |
| Spurgin (Note: The Spurgin, Colorado, post office was renamed Vim on December 16, 1927.) | Weld | | Dec 07, 1916 | Dec 16, 1927 |
| Squaretop | Archuleta | | Jun 11, 1917 | Aug 15, 1918 |
| Squaw Creek | Eagle | | Jul 14, 1884 | Jan 14, 1888 |
| Squaw Point | Dolores | | Nov 03, 1920 | May 15, 1926 |
| Squirrel Creek | El Paso | | Jan 24, 1911 | Jul 31, 1916 |
| Stage Canyon | Las Animas | | Feb 11, 1919 | Nov 30, 1920 |
| Stamford | Las Animas | | May 02, 1883 | Jun 14, 1902 |
| Stamford | Las Animas | | Jul 27, 1905 | Apr 15, 1920 |
| Standish | Gunnison | | Sep 10, 1885 | Oct 25, 1886 |
| Stanley (Note: The Coryell, Colorado, post office was renamed Stanley on January 8, 1890.) | Costilla | | Jan 08, 1890 | Sep 02, 1891 |
| Starbuck (Note: The Joylan, Colorado, post office was renamed Starbuck on July 7, 1920, and was then renamed Idledale on September 1, 1930.) | Jefferson | 80453 | Jul 07, 1920 | Sep 01, 1930 |
| Starkville | Las Animas | 81082 | May 23, 1879 | Mar 01, 1975 |
| Starr | Phillips | | Feb 02, 1907 | Jun 11, 1907 |
| State Bridge | Eagle | 80423 | Nov 08, 1909 | Apr 15, 1915 |
| Steamboat Springs | Routt | 80487-80488; 80477 | Jun 20, 1878 | open |
| Steffens | Yuma | | Aug 25, 1915 | Nov 15, 1919 |
| Sterling | Logan | 80751 | Feb 24, 1874 | open |
| Sterling | Park | | Dec 23, 1862 | Nov 17, 1865 |
| Stevens | Gunnison | | Jun 09, 1881 | Mar 21, 1882 |
| Stevenson | Baca | | Feb 15, 1888 | Oct 30, 1888 |
| Stewart | Kiowa | | Apr 23, 1888 | Apr 25, 1899 |
| Stillwater | Grand | 80447 | Oct 04, 1911 | Oct 30, 1930 |
| Stockade | Bent | | Mar 21, 1873 | Jan 30, 1874 |
| Stockville | Las Animas | | May 19, 1873 | Jul 01, 1875 |
| Stockyards (Note: The Stockyards, Colorado, post office was made a branch of the Denver post office on January 15, 1904.) | Denver | 80216 | Apr 16, 1898 | Jan 15, 1904 |
| Stone City (Note: Stone City, Colorado, was commonly known as Cabin Springs.) | Pueblo | | Oct 14, 1912 | Jun 30, 1957 |
| Stoneham | Weld | 80754 | Aug 02, 1888 | Jan 12, 1892 |
| Stoneham | Weld | 80754 | May 27, 1907 | Oct 15, 1908 |
| Stoneham | Weld | 80754 | Jun 08, 1910 | open |
| Stoner | Montezuma | 81323 | Apr 04, 1917 | Nov 30, 1954 |
| Stonewall (Note: Stonewall, Colorado, was commonly known as Stonewall Gap.) | Las Animas | 81091 | Aug 06, 1878 | Jan 31, 1918 |
| Stonington | Baca | 81090 | Jan 20, 1888 | Dec 12, 1992 |
| Stout | Larimer | | Sep 04, 1882 | Jul 31, 1908 |
| Strange | Las Animas | | Mar 31, 1881 | Oct 05, 1883 |
| Strasburg | Adams; Arapahoe | 80136 | May 25, 1908 | open |
| Stratton (Note: The Claremont, Colorado, post office was renamed Stratton on March 24, 1906.) | Kit Carson | 80836 | Mar 24, 1906 | open |
| Streater (Note: The Streater, Colorado, post office was renamed Mosca on December 30, 1890.) | Alamosa | 81146 | Apr 23, 1888 | Dec 30, 1890 |
| Strong | Huerfano | | Mar 31, 1905 | May 31, 1929 |
| Strontia | Douglas | | Oct 03, 1903 | Dec 01, 1903 |
| Strontia Springs (Note: The Deane, Colorado, post office closed on October 16, 1884, but reopened as Deansbury on June 23, 1890. The Deansbury Post Office closed on February 3, 1892, but reopened as Strontia Springs on September 27, 1911.) | Jefferson | | Sep 27, 1911 | Jan 15, 1932 |
| Stuart | Kiowa | | Mar 18, 1911 | Nov 20, 1912 |
| Stunner (Note: The Loyton, Colorado, post office was renamed Stunner on October 2, 1884.) | Conejos | | Oct 02, 1886 | Nov 17, 1894 |
| Stunner | Conejos | | Jun 25, 1913 | Jan 31, 1914 |
| Sublime (Note: Sublime, Colorado, was also known as Point Sublime.) | El Paso | | May 28, 1903 | Aug 31, 1909 |
| Suffolk | El Paso | | Feb 05, 1879 | Sep 11, 1886 |
| Sugar City (Note: The Wait, Colorado, post office was renamed Sugar City on March 27, 1900.) | Crowley | 81076 | Mar 27, 1900 | open |
| Sugarloaf | Boulder | 80302 | Sep 30, 1867 | Jun 26, 1868 |
| Sugarloaf | Boulder | 80302 | Feb 12, 1869 | Feb 29, 1944 |
| Sulphur | Rio Blanco | | Jul 02, 1902 | Jan 15, 1926 |
| Sulphur Springs (Note: The name of the Hot Sulphur Springs, Colorado, post office was shortened to Sulphur Springs on June 26, 1894, but was then changed back to Hot Sulphur Springs on February 15, 1912.) | Grand | 80451 | Jun 26, 1894 | Feb 15, 1912 |
| Sulphur Springs | Park | | Feb 07, 1873 | Dec 23, 1874 |
| Sultana | San Miguel | | Jan 25, 1899 | Aug 31, 1899 |
| Sultana | San Miguel | | Oct 22, 1900 | Oct 14, 1903 |
| Summit (Note: The Summit, Colorado Territory, post office was the highest elevation U.S. post office from its opening on February 10, 1876, until its closing on September 24, 1879, and again from its reopening on October 16, 1879, until January 9, 1882. Colorado was admitted to the Union on August 1, 1876, and the Summit post office was renamed Summitville on November 17, 1880.) | Rio Grande | 81132 | Feb 10, 1876 | Sep 24, 1879 |
| Summit | Rio Grande | 81132 | Oct 16, 1879 | Nov 17, 1880 |
| Summit Park (Note: The Summit Park, Colorado, post office moved to Manitou Park on March 19, 1888, and was renamed Woodland Park on February 20, 1890. A new Summit Park post office opened on March 17, 1890, and a new Manitou Park post office opened at a new location on June 30, 1890.) | Teller | 80863 | Sep 01, 1873 | Mar 19, 1888 |
| Summit Park | Teller | 80863 | Mar 17, 1890 | Jul 15, 1892 |
| Summitville | Rio Grande | 81132 | Nov 17, 1880 | Apr 30, 1912 |
| Summitville | Rio Grande | 81132 | Jul 12, 1935 | Nov 25, 1947 |
| Sun View | El Paso | | Oct 15, 1877 | Jan 28, 1885 |
| Sun View | El Paso | | Mar 19, 1889 | May 27, 1896 |
| Sunbeam | Moffat | 81640 | Oct 01, 1912 | Jun 15, 1942 |
| Sunflower | Conejos | | Jun 03, 1889 | Jan 14, 1892 |
| Sunlight | Garfield | | Oct 19, 1897 | Dec 13, 1898 |
| Sunlight | Garfield | | Mar 11, 1899 | Sep 02, 1912 |
| Sunnyside | Hinsdale | | Apr 07, 1886 | Jan 03, 1891 |
| Sunol | Fremont | | Sep 08, 1892 | Oct 18, 1894 |
| Sunset | Boulder | 80302 | Sep 25, 1883 | Apr 30, 1917 |
| Sunset | Boulder | 80302 | Mar 11, 1918 | Nov 15, 1921 |
| Sunshine | Boulder | 80302 | Feb 26, 1875 | Aug 31, 1913 |
| Superior | Boulder; Jefferson | 80027 | Dec 14, 1896 | Mar 15, 1900 |
| Superior | Boulder; Jefferson | 80027 | Apr 14, 1900 | Jan 31, 1955 |
| Surber | El Paso | | Jun 11, 1895 | Jul 31, 1916 |
| Suttle | Gunnison | | Aug 25, 1882 | Apr 12, 1883 |
| Swallows | Pueblo | | Nov 12, 1892 | Apr 24, 1926 |
| Swallows | Pueblo | | Sep 01, 1926 | Aug 06, 1947 |
| Swan (Note: Swan, Colorado, was commonly known as Swan City.) | Summit | | Aug 04, 1880 | Feb 23, 1898 |
| Swandyke | Summit | | Nov 30, 1898 | Sep 30, 1910 |
| Sweetwater | Kiowa | | May 28, 1908 | Aug 15, 1918 |
| Swift | Lincoln | | Dec 17, 1910 | Dec 31, 1919 |
| Swinford | Adams | | May 28, 1912 | Oct 15, 1913 |
| Swink (Note: The Fairmount, Colorado, post office was renamed Swink on February 7, 1906.) | Otero | 81077 | Feb 07, 1906 | open |
| Sylvanite | Chaffee | | May 16, 1898 | Jul 28, 1898 |
| Sylvanite | San Juan | | Sep 20, 1893 | Oct 26, 1894 |
| Symes | Jefferson | 80135 | Feb 09, 1887 | Jan 31, 1899 |

== T ==
Select the OpenStreetMap link at the right to view the location of some of the post offices in this section.

| Post office | Current county | ZIP Code | Date opened | Date closed |
|---|---|---|---|---|
| Tabasco (Note: The name of Tabasco, Colorado, was commonly spelled Tabasca.) | Las Animas | | Sep 26, 1901 | Mar 14, 1925 |
| Tabeguache | Huerfano | | Feb 22, 1869 | Sep 20, 1869 |
| Tabernash | Grand | 80478 | Sep 30, 1905 | open |
| Table Mountain | Pueblo | 81069 | Sep 12, 1879 | Oct 04, 1880 |
| Table Rock | El Paso | | Dec 15, 1873 | Nov 11, 1893 |
| Tabor | Arapahoe | | Aug 20, 1879 | Apr 11, 1890 |
| Tabor | Lake | | Apr 14, 1879 | Jan 27, 1881 |
| Taclamur | Fremont | | Oct 18, 1901 | Sep 14, 1905 |
| Tacoma | La Plata | | Sep 25, 1906 | Nov 30, 1954 |
| Tacoma | Lake | | Sep 20, 1883 | Oct 30, 1883 |
| Tacoma | Lake | | Nov 03, 1885 | Mar 12, 1886 |
| Tacony | Pueblo | | Mar 25, 1915 | Jul 31, 1942 |
| Talpa | Huerfano | 81040 | Oct 16, 1890 | Oct 31, 1904 |
| Talpa | Huerfano | 81040 | Nov 09, 1904 | Dec 31, 1912 |
| Tarryall (1859) (Note: Tarryall, Kansas Territory, commonly known as Tarryall City, served as the seat of Park County, Jefferson Territory, from November 28, 1859, until June 6, 1861, and then served as the original seat of Park County, Colorado Territory, from November 1, 1861, until January 7, 1862.) | Park | | Jan 04, 1860 | Sep 29, 1863 |
| Tarryall (Note: The current town of Tarryall, Colorado, was previously known as Puma City.) | Park | 80827 | Sep 19, 1896 | Sep 30, 1909 |
| Tarryall | Park | 80827 | Dec 19, 1914 | Mar 31, 1933 |
| Taylor (Note: The Cooper, Colorado, post office was renamed Taylor on September 28, 1882, but was then changed back to Cooper on July 31, 1886.) | Eagle | | Sep 28, 1882 | Jul 31, 1886 |
| Taylorville | Pueblo | | Jun 17, 1878 | Nov 12, 1892 |
| Teller | Grand | | Jul 19, 1880 | Dec 16, 1885 |
| Teller (Note: The Teller, Colorado, post office opened on April 29, 1892, at the town of Bachelor, a name not acceptable to the United States Post Office Department.) | Mineral | | Apr 29, 1892 | Mar 15, 1912 |
| Telluride (Note: The Telluride, Colorado, post office opened on July 26, 1880, at the town of Columbia, a name not acceptable to the United States Post Office Department. Columbia (Telluride since 1887) has been the seat of San Miguel County, Colorado, since the county was created on March 2, 1883. The Town of Columbia was incorporated on February 10, 1887, but the town changed its name to the Town of Telluride a few months later.) | San Miguel | 81435 | Jul 26, 1880 | Aug 17, 1880 |
| Telluride | San Miguel | 81435 | Dec 13, 1880 | open |
| Tellurium | Hinsdale | | Aug 24, 1875 | Oct 04, 1880 |
| Ten Mile | Summit | | May 16, 1879 | Feb 17, 1881 |
| Tennessee Pass | Eagle | | Feb 06, 1890 | Jul 27, 1893 |
| Tennessee Pass | Lake | | Jul 14, 1912 | Nov 30, 1959 |
| Tercio | Las Animas | | Jul 05, 1902 | Sep 30, 1949 |
| Terrace | Conejos | | Dec 18, 1894 | Apr 14, 1900 |
| Tetons | Saguache | | Aug 30, 1880 | Jun 06, 1881 |
| Texas (Note: The original Texas Creek, Colorado, post office closed on March 31, 1882, but reopened as Texas on May 12, 1882, and was then renamed Hillside on January 21, 1884. The Ford post office was renamed Texas Creek on September 10, 1885.) | Fremont | 81232 | May 12, 1882 | Jan 21, 1884 |
| Texas Creek (1872) | Fremont | 81232 | Aug 27, 1872 | Mar 31, 1882 |
| Texas Creek | Fremont | 81223 | Sep 10, 1885 | open |
| Texas Ranch | Bent | | Dec 19, 1871 | Jun 16, 1873 |
| Thatcher | Las Animas | 81059 | Nov 09, 1883 | Dec 03, 1884 |
| Thatcher | Las Animas | 81059 | Jan 29, 1885 | Oct 13, 1888 |
| Thatcher | Las Animas | 81059 | Dec 30, 1890 | May 20, 1911 |
| Thatcher | Las Animas | 81059 | Aug 29, 1911 | Jul 20, 1973 |
| The Meadows | Bent | | Apr 10, 1873 | Oct 02, 1876 |
| Thedalund | Adams | | Jul 17, 1917 | Jul 31, 1926 |
| Theisen | Routt | | Jun 03, 1909 | Dec 31, 1911 |
| Thomasville (Note: The Calcium, Colorado, post office was renamed Thomasville on March 31, 1890.) | Pitkin | 81642 | Mar 31, 1890 | Aug 10, 1918 |
| Thornburg | Rio Blanco | | Oct 10, 1900 | Oct 30, 1937 |
| Thornton | Adams; Weld | 80229, 80023; 80221, 80233; 80241, 80260; 80602 | NA | open |
| Thornton (Note: The Wagon Wheel Gap, Colorado, post office was renamed Thornton on February 2, 1895, but was then changed back to Wagon Wheel Gap on March 26, 1901.) | Mineral | 81154 | Jun 24, 1895 | Mar 26, 1901 |
| Thurman | Washington | 80801 | Jul 06, 1888 | Mar 31, 1955 |
| Tiffany | La Plata | 81137 | Dec 03, 1907 | Nov 30, 1954 |
| Tiger | Summit | | Dec 26, 1919 | Oct 31, 1940 |
| Tigiwon | Eagle | | Jun 05, 1929 | Sep 30, 1942 |
| Timber Hill (Note: The Jennison, Colorado, post office was renamed Timber Hill on April 25, 1879.) | San Juan | | Apr 25, 1879 | Jan 03, 1881 |
| Timberton | Park | | May 26, 1898 | Oct 27, 1898 |
| Timnath | Larimer | 80547 | Jul 10, 1884 | open |
| Timpas | Otero | 81050 | May 27, 1891 | Oct 23, 1970 |
| Tin Cup (Note: The Virginia, Colorado, post office in Gunnison County was renamed Tin Cup on February 28, 1880, and then the spelling was changed to Tincup on May 7, 1895.) | Gunnison | 81210 | Feb 28, 1880 | May 07, 1895 |
| Tincup | Gunnison | 81210 | May 07, 1895 | Jan 31, 1918 |
| Tindale | Jefferson | | Nov 02, 1891 | Feb 06, 1893 |
| Tioga | Huerfano | 81089 | Nov 21, 1907 | Mar 15, 1954 |
| Tipperary | Weld | | Jul 14, 1915 | Jan 15, 1917 |
| Tiptop | Gilpin | | Apr 18, 1890 | Dec 24, 1890 |
| Tiptop | Grand | | Jul 26, 1909 | Aug 31, 1910 |
| Titusville | Fremont | | Oct 12, 1881 | Aug 13, 1883 |
| Tobe | Las Animas | | Dec 17, 1910 | Jan 31, 1960 |
| Toledo (Note: The McMillan, Colorado, post office was renamed Toledo on April 16, 1887.) | Prowers | | Apr 16, 1887 | Sep 16, 1889 |
| Toliafero | Gunnison | | Feb 20, 1896 | Apr 16, 1898 |
| Tolland | Gilpin | 80474 | Oct 26, 1904 | Jun 30, 1944 |
| Tollerburg | Las Animas | | Mar 18, 1909 | May 30, 1931 |
| Toltec | Huerfano | | Apr 13, 1911 | Dec 31, 1953 |
| Toltec | La Plata | | Jan 26, 1887 | Nov 21, 1887 |
| Tomichi (Note: The Argenta, Colorado, post office was renamed Tomichi on August 23, 1880.) | Gunnison | | Aug 23, 1880 | Aug 31, 1893 |
| Tomichi | Gunnison | | Oct 27, 1898 | Nov 30, 1899 |
| Toof (Note: The Toof, Colorado, post office was renamed Beaver Creek on January 8, 1883, and was then shortened to Beaver on April 11, 1902.) | Fremont | | Apr 21, 1881 | Jan 08, 1883 |
| Toponas | Routt | 80479 | Jul 25, 1888 | open |
| Torres | Las Animas | 81091 | Sep 25, 1894 | Jan 31, 1918 |
| Torrington | Teller | | Sep 14, 1896 | Nov 14, 1903 |
| Tosh | Routt | | Oct 08, 1915 | Jan 15, 1917 |
| Touraine | Teller | | Nov 16, 1889 | Apr 10, 1901 |
| Tourist (Note: The Walsenburgh, Colorado, post office was renamed Tourist on October 20, 1887, but was then changed back to Walsenburgh on November 29 of that year. The spelling was shortened to Walsenburg on December 22, 1892.) | Huerfano | 81089 | Oct 20, 1887 | Nov 29, 1887 |
| Tourtellotte | Pitkin | | Mar 19, 1889 | Nov 05, 1894 |
| Towaoc (Note: Towaoc, Colorado is the headquarters of the Ute Mountain Ute Tribe.) | Montezuma | 81334 | Apr 01, 1915 | open |
| Towner | Kiowa | 81071 | Feb 20, 1888 | May 09, 1892 |
| Townsend | Washington | | Jan 14, 1890 | Sep 29, 1893 |
| Townsite (Note: The Carriso, Colorado, post office closed on July 11, 1895, but reopened as Townsite on March 18, 1900. The Townsite post office closed on December 31, 1902, but reopened as Carrizo on September 21, 1907.) | Baca | | Mar 18, 1900 | Dec 31, 1902 |
| Trail Ridge (Note: The Trail Ridge, Colorado, post office operated during the summer only from 1937 to 1953 at Fall River Pass in Rocky Mountain National Park.) | Larimer | | Jul 08, 1937 | Dec 31, 1953 |
| Trappers Lake | Garfield | | May 26, 1927 | Oct 31, 1934 |
| Trimble | La Plata | 81301 | Jan 29, 1883 | Jan 14, 1886 |
| Trimble | La Plata | 81301 | May 06, 1886 | Oct 19, 1896 |
| Trimble | La Plata | 81301 | Dec 28, 1896 | Sep 15, 1900 |
| Trinchera | Las Animas | 81081 | Feb 14, 1889 | open |
| Trinidad | Las Animas | 81082 | Jun 17, 1862 | Sep 19, 1864 |
| Trinidad | Las Animas | 81082 | Feb 06, 1866 | open |
| Troublesome | Grand | 80459 | Mar 15, 1878 | 1908 |
| Troublesome | Grand | 80459 | Mar 26, 1914 | May 15, 1935 |
| Trout | Ouray | | Jun 09, 1881 | Mar 21, 1882 |
| Trout Creek | Routt | | Mar 13, 1926 | Feb 15, 1935 |
| Trout Lake | San Miguel | | Jun 14, 1882 | Nov 12, 1885 |
| Trout Lake | San Miguel | | Apr 08, 1890 | Jun 29, 1892 |
| Troutville | Eagle | | Dec 06, 1909 | Dec 31, 1954 |
| Troy | Las Animas | | Oct 27, 1887 | Jun 30, 1942 |
| Trujillo | Archuleta | 81147 | Feb 20, 1900 | Sep 30, 1905 |
| Trull | Routt | | Jun 16, 1888 | Apr 17, 1896 |
| Trull | Routt | | Aug 10, 1897 | Nov 15, 1922 |
| Trump | Park | | May 01, 1928 | Nov 30, 1931 |
| Truro | Park | | Aug 11, 1887 | Sep 11, 1895 |
| Tuck | Baca | | Feb 16, 1916 | Jun 09, 1917 |
| Tucker | Gunnison | | Dec 28, 1896 | Nov 10, 1897 |
| Tumichi | Gunnison | | Oct 24, 1879 | Aug 23, 1880 |
| Tungsten | Boulder | | Jul 10, 1916 | Nov 30, 1949 |
| Tunnel | Mesa | | Oct 10, 1902 | Dec 31, 1903 |
| Turkey Creek (Note: The Turkey Creek, Colorado, post office in El Paso County closed on October 25, 1881, but reopened as Lytle on August 12, 1885.) | El Paso | | Jul 16, 1877 | Oct 25, 1881 |
| Turkey Creek | Jefferson | | Dec 16, 1874 | Aug 24, 1875 |
| Turner | Gunnison | | Apr 19, 1881 | Oct 14, 1881 |
| Turret | Chaffee | 81201 | Feb 28, 1898 | Jul 20, 1920 |
| Turret | Chaffee | 81201 | Jul 20, 1920 | Oct 31, 1939 |
| Tuttle | Kit Carson | | Mar 27, 1883 | Jul 31, 1918 |
| Twelve Mile | Grand | | Jun 19, 1879 | Aug 05, 1880 |
| Twin Lakes | Lake | 81251, 81228 | Dec 19, 1879 | Apr 25, 1975 |
| Two Buttes | Baca | 81084 | Mar 01, 1910 | open |
| Tyler | Douglas | | Nov 27, 1895 | Jul 30, 1897 |
| Tyner | Jackson | | Oct 24, 1879 | Jul 20, 1881 |
| Tyrone (Note: The Yetta, Colorado, post office was renamed Tyrone on August 1, 1929.) | Las Animas | 81059 | Aug 01, 1929 | Dec 06, 1968 |

== U ==
Select the OpenStreetMap link at the right to view the location of some of the post offices in this section.

| Post office | Current county | ZIP Code | Date opened | Date closed |
|---|---|---|---|---|
| Ula (Note: Ula, served as the original seat of Custer County, Colorado, since the county was created on March 9, 1877, until 1878.) | Custer | | Dec 01, 1871 | May 04, 1891 |
| Unaweep | Mesa | | Aug 21, 1883 | Sep 18, 1890 |
| Unaweep | Mesa | | Apr 25, 1895 | Sep 22, 1898 |
| Uncapaghre (Note: The spelling of the Uncapaghre, Colorado, post office was changed to Uncompahgre on March 20, 1876.) | San Juan | 81403 | Dec 20, 1875 | Mar 20, 1876 |
| Uncompahgre | Montrose | | Oct 14, 1880 | Nov 30, 1906 |
| Uncompahgre | San Juan | 81403 | Mar 20, 1876 | Feb 23, 1877 |
| Undercliffe | Pueblo | | Jan 20, 1879 | Sep 30, 1925 |
| Underhill | Costilla | | Mar 28, 1872 | May 20, 1873 |
| United States Air Force Academy | El Paso | 80840-80841 | Jun 28, 1958 | open |
| University Park (Note: The University Park, Colorado, post office became Station #39 of the Denver post office on December 31, 1915.) | Denver | 80210 | Jun 16, 1890 | Jan 15, 1904 |
| University Park | Denver | 80210 | May 18, 1904 | Dec 31, 1915 |
| Uranium | Montrose | | Aug 29, 1900 | Feb 15, 1922 |
| Uravan | Montrose | | Aug 27, 1936 | Dec 01, 1986 |
| Urmston | Jefferson | 80470 | Mar 25, 1891 | Aug 15, 1900 |
| Ute (Note: The Ute, Colorado, post office was renamed Huerfano on April 27, 1900.) | Huerfano | | Aug 12, 1888 | Apr 27, 1890 |
| Ute (Note: The Ute, Colorado, post office was renamed Grand Junction on May 26, 1882.) | Mesa | 81501 | Feb 03, 1882 | May 26, 1882 |
| Ute | Montrose | 81431 | May 24, 1912 | Mar 31, 1951 |
| Utleyville | Baca | 81064 | Jun 09, 1917 | Jan 05, 1973 |

== V ==
Select the OpenStreetMap link at the right to view the location of some of the post offices in this section.

| Post office | Current county | ZIP Code | Date opened | Date closed |
|---|---|---|---|---|
| Vadner | Conejos | | Sep 18, 1884 | Jul 31, 1885 |
| Vail | Eagle | 81657-81658 | Jan 29, 1966 | open |
| Val Moritz | Grand | | Apr 01, 1973 | Mar 21, 1975 |
| Valdai | Jackson | | Jun 14, 1889 | May 11, 1892 |
| Valdez | Las Animas | 81082 | Apr 20, 1910 | Sep 15, 1961 |
| Vallecito (Note: The Viceto, Colorado, post office closed on October 15, 1891, but reopened as Vallecito on November 15, 1901.) | La Plata | 81122 | Nov 15, 1901 | Dec 30, 1916 |
| Vallecito | La Plata | 81122 | Aug 26, 1939 | Mar 15, 1942 |
| Vallery | Morgan | | Dec 21, 1907 | Feb 15, 1909 |
| Vallery | Morgan | | Feb 12, 1910 | Aug 15, 1919 |
| Valley | Kit Carson | | Jun 02, 1898 | Aug 15, 1901 |
| Vallorso | Las Animas | 81082 | Sep 14, 1918 | May 31, 1954 |
| Valmont | Boulder | 80301 | Sep 15, 1865 | Jun 29, 1901 |
| Valverde (Note: On December 1, 1902, the newly created City and County of Denver annexed the towns of Argo, Berkeley, Elyria, Globeville, Montclair, and Valverde.) | Denver | 80223 | Oct 14, 1889 | Feb 29, 1908 |
| Vanadium (Note: The Newmire, Colorado, post office was renamed Vanadium on May 17, 1913.) | San Miguel | | May 17, 1913 | Jul 31, 1942 |
| Vance | San Miguel | | Oct 26, 1894 | Sep 30, 1909 |
| Vansville | Kit Carson | | Sep 14, 1907 | Nov 20, 1907 |
| Varros | Las Animas | | Sep 21, 1902 | Feb 14, 1903 |
| Vega | Mesa | | Nov 23, 1891 | Apr 15, 1914 |
| Vega Ranch | Las Animas | | Sep 21, 1916 | Jun 14, 1924 |
| Verde | Pueblo | | Apr 09, 1903 | Oct 31, 1912 |
| Verdun | Prowers | | Feb 02, 1920 | Jun 15, 1920 |
| Vermilion | Jefferson | 80433 | Jan 03, 1881 | Jun 07, 1881 |
| Verne | Delta | | Oct 12, 1903 | Dec 30, 1903 |
| Vernon (Note: The Condon, Colorado, post office was renamed Vernon on May 23, 1892.) | Yuma | 80755 | May 23, 1892 | open |
| Vesuvius | Boulder | | Apr 15, 1908 | Jun 30, 1908 |
| Veta Pass (Note: The Veta Pass, Colorado, post office in Huerfano County closed on October 16, 1890, but reopened on the other side of the pass in Costilla County as Laveta Pass on January 5, 1904, but was then renamed Veta Pass on April 13, 1911.) | Huerfano | 81055 | Jun 15, 1889 | Oct 16, 1890 |
| Veta Pass | Costilla | 81133 | Apr 13, 1911 | Apr 30, 1935 |
| Veteran | Saguache | | May 17, 1888 | Apr 16, 1894 |
| Viceto | La Plata | 81122 | May 19, 1890 | Oct 15, 1891 |
| Vicksburg | Chaffee | | May 03, 1881 | Jul 30, 1885 |
| Victor | Teller | 80860 | Jun 07, 1894 | open |
| Vigil | Las Animas | 81091 | Nov 05, 1894 | Dec 31, 1912 |
| Vilas | Baca | 81087 | Jun 20, 1887 | open |
| Villa Grove (Note: The Garibaldi, Colorado Territory, post office was renamed Villa Grove on January 19, 1872, was then respelled Villagrove on October 12, 1894, but was then changed back to Villa Grove on July 01, 1950.) | Saguache | 81155 | Jan 19, 1872 | Oct 12, 1894 |
| Villa Grove | Saguache | 81155 | Jul 01, 1950 | open |
| Villa Park (Note: The spelling of the Villa Park, Colorado, post office was changed to Villapark on May 6, 1895.) | Denver | 80204 | Feb 15, 1890 | May 06, 1895 |
| Village | Otero | | Nov 01, 1943 | Mar 31, 1956 |
| Villagreen | Las Animas | 81049 | Apr 21, 1917 | Nov 11, 1985 |
| Villagrove | Saguache | 81155 | Oct 12, 1894 | Jul 01, 1950 |
| Villapark | Denver | 80204 | May 06, 1895 | Apr 20, 1920 |
| Vim | Weld | | Dec 16, 1927 | Sep 30, 1944 |
| Virginia | Douglas | | Sep 29, 1869 | Feb 08, 1871 |
| Virginia | Gunnison | 81210 | Jul 22, 1879 | Feb 28, 1880 |
| Virginia Dale | Larimer | 80536 | Jan 09, 1868 | Sep 28, 1868 |
| Virginia Dale | Larimer | 80536 | Sep 14, 1871 | Jan 27, 1967 |
| Virginius | Ouray | | Aug 16, 1887 | Apr 24, 1894 |
| Vollmar | Weld | 80621 | Nov 02, 1910 | Oct 31, 1912 |
| Vona | Kit Carson | 80861 | Jan 19, 1889 | Jul 09, 1895 |
| Vona | Kit Carson | 80861 | Jun 25, 1901 | Oct 14, 1905 |
| Vona | Kit Carson | 80861 | Jan 21, 1907 | open |
| Vroman (Note: The Weitzer, Colorado, post office was renamed Vroman on July 22, 1918.) | Otero | 81067 | Jul 22, 1918 | Dec 31, 1954 |
| Vulcan (Note: The Coalridge, Colorado, post office was renamed Vulcan on October 26, 1893.) | Garfield | | Oct 06, 1892 | Oct 23, 1893 |
| Vulcan | Gunnison | | Aug 02, 1895 | Aug 15, 1912 |

== W ==
Select the OpenStreetMap link at the right to view the location of some of the post offices in this section.

| Post office | Current county | ZIP Code | Date opened | Date closed |
|---|---|---|---|---|
| Wabash (Note: The Wabash, Colorado, post office was renamed Gibson on December 1, 1911.) | Saguache | | May 09, 1911 | Dec 01, 1911 |
| Wachtel | Weld | | Mar 20, 1913 | Mar 15, 1916 |
| Wadleigh | Park | | Jun 24, 1895 | Nov 11, 1895 |
| Wages | Yuma | | Mar 31, 1917 | May 31, 1950 |
| Wagon Wheel Gap | Mineral | 81154 | Aug 27, 1875 | Feb 02, 1895 |
| Wagon Wheel Gap | Mineral | 81154 | Mar 26, 1901 | Nov 30, 1954 |
| Wagon Wheel Gap | Mineral | 81154 | Jun 01, 1955 | Sep 30, 1957 |
| Wait | Crowley | 81076 | Feb 26, 1900 | Mar 27, 1900 |
| Waitley | Washington | | Jun 15, 1915 | Jan 15, 1936 |
| Wakeman | Phillips | | Sep 19, 1887 | May 15, 1897 |
| Walden | Jackson | 80480 | Feb 28, 1881 | open |
| Waldorf | Clear Creek | | Oct 05, 1906 | Feb 29, 1912 |
| Wales | Yuma | | Aug 06, 1887 | Sep 21, 1888 |
| Wallett | Kit Carson | | Apr 08, 1890 | May 15, 1907 |
| Wallrock (Note: The Wallrock post office moved south from Sweetwater County, Wyoming to Routt County, Colorado on July 29, 1902.) | Moffat | | Jul 29, 1902 | Jun 30, 1903 |
| Walls | La Plata | | Apr 25, 1896 | Aug 13, 1896 |
| Wallstreet (Note: The Delphi, Colorado, post office was renamed Wallstreet on April 18, 1898.) | Boulder | 80302 | Apr 18, 1898 | Sep 15, 1921 |
| Walsen | Huerfano | | Mar 29, 1902 | Oct 31, 1932 |
| Walsenburg | Huerfano | 81089 | Dec 22, 1892 | open |
| Walsenburgh | Huerfano | 81089 | Dec 14, 1870 | Oct 20, 1887 |
| Walsenburgh | Huerfano | 81089 | Nov 29, 1887 | Dec 22, 1892 |
| Walsh | Baca | 81090 | Dec 23, 1926 | open |
| Wapiti | Summit | | Mar 16, 1894 | Apr 15, 1903 |
| Ward (Note: The name of the Ward District, Colorado, post office was shortened to Ward on September 11, 1894.) | Boulder | 80481 | Sep 11, 1894 | open |
| Ward District | Boulder | 80481 | Jan 13, 1863 | Sep 11, 1894 |
| Waremont | Pueblo | | Jun 13, 1916 | Apr 15, 1922 |
| Wareville | San Miguel | | May 15, 1877 | Jul 17, 1877 |
| Warrantsville | Huerfano | | Jul 10, 1876 | Sep 13, 1877 |
| Washburn (Note: The Washburn, Colorado, post office was renamed Derblay on July 13, 1892, but the name was changed back to Washburn on December 22 of that year, only to be renamed Hazeltine on January 7, 1893.) | Adams | 80601 | Sep 12, 1889 | Jul 13, 1892 |
| Washburn | Adams | 80601 | Dec 22, 1892 | Jan 07, 1893 |
| Wason (Note: Wason served as the original seat of Mineral County, Colorado, from March 27, 1893, until November 7 of that year.) | Mineral | | Dec 26, 1891 | Apr 30, 1904 |
| Water Valley | Kiowa | | Sep 09, 1887 | Sep 12, 1894 |
| Waterman | Garfield | | May 21, 1888 | 1888 |
| Watervale | Las Animas | | Jul 06, 1888 | Jun 09, 1893 |
| Watervale | Las Animas | | Jun 13, 1896 | Aug 31, 1900 |
| Watervale | Las Animas | | Aug 18, 1903 | Dec 31, 1917 |
| Watervale | Las Animas | | Nov 19, 1919 | Mar 31, 1921 |
| Watkins | Arapahoe; Adams | 80137 | Jan 03, 1878 | Oct 14, 1893 |
| Watkins | Arapahoe; Adams | 80137 | Nov 06, 1894 | open |
| Watonga | Saguache | | Jun 06, 1910 | Oct 31, 1911 |
| Watson (Note: The Watson, Colorado, post office was renamed Gerbazdale on June 14, 1918.) | Pitkin | | May 31, 1889 | Jun 14, 1918 |
| Waunita (Note: The Elgin, Colorado, post office was renamed Waunita on September 10, 1885. The Waunita Post Office closed on April 15, 1908, but reopened as Waunita Hot Springs on May 27, 1910.) | Gunnison | 81230 | Sep 10, 1885 | Mar 12, 1886 |
| Waunita | Gunnison | 81230 | Jul 07, 1886 | Nov 11, 1886 |
| Waunita | Gunnison | 81230 | Aug 11, 1887 | Oct 23, 1895 |
| Waunita | Gunnison | 81230 | Aug 08, 1896 | Apr 15, 1908 |
| Waunita Hot Springs | Gunnison | 81230 | May 27, 1910 | Oct 31, 1942 |
| Waverly | El Paso | | May 01, 1897 | 1897 |
| Waverly | Larimer | | Feb 23, 1906 | May 15, 1912 |
| Wayne (Note: The Lowland, Colorado, post office was renamed Wayne on January 15, 1909.) | El Paso | | Jan 15, 1909 | Nov 30, 1912 |
| Wayside | Costilla | | Feb 15, 1875 | Sep 10, 1878 |
| Webb | Prowers | | May 31, 1910 | Nov 29, 1919 |
| Webster | Park | | May 07, 1877 | Sep 30, 1909 |
| Weir (Note: The second Julesburg, Colorado, post office was renamed Denver Junction on January 7, 1885. The Denver Junction post office closed on May 26, 1886, but reopened as Weir on June 21, 1889.) | Park | 80737 | Jun 21, 1889 | Dec 22, 1890 |
| Weissport | El Paso | | Jul 21, 1875 | Aug 03, 1880 |
| Weissport | El Paso | | Oct 21, 1880 | Mar 22, 1887 |
| Weitzer | Otero | 81067 | Jun 27, 1908 | Jul 22, 1918 |
| Welby | Adams | 80229 | Dec 19, 1910 | Mar 31, 1911 |
| Welcome | Delta | | Jun 22, 1910 | Aug 31, 1912 |
| Weld (1869) (Note: On January 18, 1869, the Fort Lupton, Colorado Territory, post office was moved about a mile (1.6 km) south from the stage stop to the settlement, and the old post office was renamed Weld.) | Weld | | Jan 18, 1869 | Dec 07, 1870 |
| Weld | Weld | | Jun 09, 1900 | Oct 27, 1900 |
| Weldon Valley | Morgan | | Mar 08, 1880 | Nov 19, 1880 |
| Weldona (Note: The Deuel, Colorado, post office was renamed Weldona on July 18, 1907.) | Morgan | 80653 | Jul 18, 1907 | open |
| Wellington | Larimer | 80549 | Aug 25, 1903 | open |
| Wellons | Lincoln | | Jun 10, 1908 | Jun 30, 1916 |
| Wellsville | Fremont | 81201 | Dec 13, 1880 | Aug 13, 1896 |
| Wenger (Note: The Wenger, Colorado, post office was renamed Menger on July 15, 1891.) | Las Animas | | Jun 15, 1891 | Jul 15, 1891 |
| Wentworth | Baca | | Jun 15, 1911 | Jun 30, 1921 |
| Wentz | Weld | | Nov 24, 1891 | Mar 14, 1903 |
| West Las Animas (Note: The old Las Animas, Colorado, post office closed on June 8, 1883. The West Las Animas, Colorado, post office was renamed Las Animas on September 4, 1886.) | Bent | 81054 | Nov 03, 1873 | Sep 04, 1886 |
| West Portal (Note: The West Portal, Colorado, post office closed on December 1, 1939, but reopened as Hideaway Park on August 4, 1949.) | Grand | 80482 | Oct 12, 1923 | Dec 01, 1939 |
| Westcliffe | Custer | 81252 | Jul 14, 1881 | Nov 21, 1882 |
| Westcliffe | Custer | 81252 | Jan 22, 1886 | open |
| Westcreek | Douglas | 80135 | Apr 14, 1902 | Aug 31, 1918 |
| Westcreek | Douglas | 80135 | Oct 26, 1918 | Jun 14, 1919 |
| Westcreek | Douglas | 80135 | Jan 09, 1935 | Jan 06, 1968 |
| Westfork | Montezuma | | Apr 18, 1903 | Mar 31, 1905 |
| Westfork | Montezuma | | Mar 07, 1907 | Apr 20, 1907 |
| Westlake | Larimer | | Apr 25, 1895 | Jul 22, 1898 |
| Westminster (Note: The Harris, Colorado, post office was renamed Westminster on June 5, 1908.) | Adams; Jefferson | 80030-80031; 80035-80036; 80003, 80005; 80020, 80021; 80023, 80221; 80234, 80241; 80260 | Jun 05, 1908 | open |
| Weston (Note: The Cordova, Colorado, post office was renamed Weston on September 9, 1889.) | Las Animas | 81091 | Sep 09, 1889 | open |
| Weston | Park | | Nov 04, 1879 | Feb 24, 1880 |
| Westplains | Logan | 80745 | May 23, 1910 | Feb 15, 1949 |
| Wetmore | Custer | 81253 | Apr 19, 1881 | open |
| Wezel | Lincoln | | Feb 08, 1911 | Jul 15, 1919 |
| Wheat Ridge | Jefferson | 80033-80034; 80212, 80214; 80215 | Jul 07, 1913 | open |
| Wheatland | El Paso | | Aug 19, 1869 | Oct 26, 1873 |
| Wheatland | Larimer | | Sep 24, 1875 | Oct 01, 1878 |
| Wheatland | Larimer | | Oct 25, 1878 | Feb 10, 1881 |
| Wheeler | Summit | | Apr 01, 1880 | May 14, 1894 |
| Wheelman | Boulder | 80302 | Jun 02, 1900 | Jul 31, 1902 |
| White | Lincoln | | Mar 06, 1901 | Nov 30, 1901 |
| White Cross (Note: The Burrows Park, Colorado, post office was renamed White Cross on September 28, 1882.) | Hinsdale | | Sep 28, 1882 | May 15, 1912 |
| White Earth | Saguache | | Jan 24, 1876 | Jun 24, 1880 |
| White Pine (Note: The spelling of the White Pine, Colorado, post office was changed to Whitepine on April 14, 1894.) | Gunnison | 81230 | Aug 12, 1880 | Apr 14, 1894 |
| White River (1871) (Note: The original White River, Colorado, post office moved to Meeker on August 23, 1880.) | Rio Blanco | 81641 | Sep 29, 1871 | Aug 23, 1880 |
| White River | Rio Blanco | | Aug 15, 1888 | Mar 15, 1908 |
| White Rock | Pueblo | | May 17, 1909 | Aug 31, 1927 |
| Whitehorn | Fremont | 81201 | Jul 22, 1897 | Nov 15, 1916 |
| Whitepine | Gunnison | 81230 | Apr 14, 1894 | Apr 30, 1928 |
| Whitepine | Gunnison | 81230 | May 01, 1949 | Apr 30, 1954 |
| Whitewater | Mesa | 81527 | Oct 09, 1884 | open |
| Whitman | Weld | | Apr 04, 1882 | Jul 16, 1882 |
| Whitney | Boulder | | Apr 27, 1868 | Jul 03, 1871 |
| Wiggins (Note: The Corona, Colorado, post office was renamed Wiggins on December 2, 1896.) | Morgan | 80654 | Dec 02, 1896 | open |
| Wigwam | El Paso | 80817 | Jun 26, 1882 | Sep 18, 1890 |
| Wigwam | El Paso | 80817 | Oct 01, 1890 | May 31, 1922 |
| Wilbur | Fremont | | Sep 11, 1894 | Jul 15, 1913 |
| Wild Horse | Cheyenne | 80862 | Jan 05, 1877 | May 25, 1877 |
| Wild Horse | Cheyenne | 80862 | Apr 13, 1904 | open |
| Wilde | Prowers | | Aug 06, 1887 | Jun 10, 1893 |
| Wilds | Larimer | | Feb 11, 1926 | Jan 31, 1934 |
| Wiley | Prowers | 81092 | Apr 22, 1907 | open |
| Willard (Note: The Willard, Colorado, post office closed on April 19, 1894, but reopened as Arnold on January 26, 1897, only to be renamed Willard on March 30, 1900.) | Logan | 80741 | Sep 26, 1888 | Apr 19, 1894 |
| Willard | Logan | 80741 | Mar 30, 1900 | Feb 28, 1901 |
| Willard | Logan | 80741 | Apr 05, 1910 | Jul 14, 1967 |
| Williamsburgh (Note: The Williamsburgh, Colorado, post office opened on January 10, 1882, and the Town of Williamsburg incorporated on April 7, 1888.) | Fremont | 81226 | Jan 10, 1882 | Oct 31, 1916 |
| Willow (Note: The Willow, Colorado, post office opened on May 12, 1891, but was renamed Creede on July 1, 1891. The nearby Amethyst, Colorado, post office opened on January 25, 1892. The Creede, Colorado, post office moved to North Creede on November 28, 1908, where it remained open until April 15, 1919. The Amethyst, Colorado, post office closed on February 2, 1909, but reopened as the new Creede, Colorado, post office on February 9, 1909.) | Mineral | 81130 | May 12, 1891 | Jul 01, 1891 |
| Willow Creek | Routt | | Feb 12, 1923 | Oct 31, 1925 |
| Willow Creek | Routt | | Sep 26, 1934 | Sep 30, 1943 |
| Willow Gulch (Note: The Disappointment, Colorado, post office closed on June 30, 1920, but reopened as Willow Gulch on March 28, 1921.) | Dolores | | Mar 28, 1921 | Dec 31, 1927 |
| Willowville | Jefferson | | Jan 08, 1879 | Jul 10, 1879 |
| Wilson | Pueblo | | Jun 24, 1911 | Sep 15, 1913 |
| Wilson | San Miguel | | Feb 07, 1895 | Nov 15, 1901 |
| Windham | Ouray | | Dec 09, 1878 | Jun 20, 1881 |
| Windsor (Note: The Windsor, Colorado, post office in Moffat County closed on July 19, 1880, but reopened as Yampa on January 12, 1883, and was then renamed Craig on August 28, 1889.) | Moffat | 81625 | Apr 26, 1877 | Jul 19, 1880 |
| Windsor (Note: The name of the New Windsor, Colorado, post office was shortened to Windsor on August 19, 1911.) | Weld; Larimer | 80550-80551; 80528 | Aug 19, 1911 | open |
| Winfield | Chaffee | | Jul 05, 1881 | Sep 15, 1912 |
| Winnview | Arapahoe | | Aug 14, 1933 | Oct 03, 1942 |
| Winona | Larimer | | Feb 02, 1889 | May 18, 1893 |
| Winston | Logan | | May 18, 1902 | Oct 15, 1902 |
| Winston | Logan | | Jul 23, 1908 | Dec 31, 1918 |
| Winter Park | Grand | 80482 | Dec 01, 1939 | open |
| Witherbee | Yuma | | May 28, 1912 | Aug 31, 1918 |
| Wolcott | Eagle | 81655 | Sep 12, 1889 | open |
| Wolfcreek | Elbert | | Mar 15, 1910 | Mar 15, 1919 |
| Wood Valley | Pueblo | | Jun 12, 1862 | Dec 24, 1865 |
| Wood Valley | Pueblo | | Oct 12, 1865 | Sep 25, 1867 |
| Wood Valley | Pueblo | | Jun 03, 1868 | Dec 15, 1869 |
| Woodland Park | Teller | 80863, 80866 | Feb 20, 1890 | open |
| Woodmen | El Paso | | Jan 20, 1912 | Jan 31, 1949 |
| Woodrow | Washington | 80757 | Sep 10, 1913 | open |
| Woodstock | Gunnison | | Aug 05, 1881 | May 09, 1882 |
| Woodstock | Gunnison | | Dec 06, 1883 | Aug 12, 1884 |
| Woody Creek | Pitkin | 81656 | Sep 04, 1920 | open |
| Wootton | Las Animas | | Dec 04, 1908 | Jan 14, 1922 |
| Wormington (Note: The Wormington, Colorado, post office was located at the town of Simpson.) | Las Animas | | Apr 19, 1919 | Sep 29, 1934 |
| Wortman | Lake | | Sep 25, 1900 | Aug 31, 1908 |
| Wortman | Lake | | May 25, 1916 | Jan 15, 1919 |
| Wray | Yuma | 80758 | Jun 26, 1882 | Apr 09, 1883 |
| Wray | Yuma | 80758 | May 02, 1883 | open |
| Wulstenville | Custer | | Jul 21, 1871 | Dec 04, 1871 |

== X ==
The only Colorado town whose name began with the letter "X" was Xenia, which never had its own post office, but was served by the Akron post office.

== Y ==
Select the OpenStreetMap link at the right to view the location of some of the post offices in this section.

| Post office | Current county | ZIP Code | Date opened | Date closed |
|---|---|---|---|---|
| Yachita | Las Animas | | Oct 06, 1916 | Jul 31, 1918 |
| Yale | Kit Carson | | Sep 10, 1891 | Nov 30, 1905 |
| Yampa | Moffat | 81625 | Apr 12, 1883 | Aug 28, 1889 |
| Yampa | Routt | 80483 | Oct 30, 1894 | open |
| Yankee | Clear Creek | 80452 | Nov 02, 1893 | Feb 28, 1910 |
| Yarmony | Eagle | | Jan 06, 1908 | Jan 27, 1908 |
| Yarmony | Eagle | | Feb 03, 1908 | May 11, 1908 |
| Yates (Note: Yates, Colorado, was later known as Bakerville.) | Clear Creek | | Sep 04, 1882 | Feb 08, 1883 |
| Yeiser | Las Animas | | Apr 16, 1904 | Jul 31, 1929 |
| Yellow Jacket | Montezuma | 81335 | May 05, 1914 | open |
| Yellowstone Creek | Huerfano | | Aug 05, 1915 | Apr 15, 1916 |
| Yetta | Las Animas | 81059 | Aug 05, 1916 | Aug 01, 1929 |
| Yoder | El Paso | 80864 | Apr 21, 1904 | open |
| Yoman | Elbert | | Feb 11, 1904 | May 12, 1904 |
| Yorkville | Fremont | 81212 | Nov 04, 1875 | 1883 |
| Youghal | Moffat | | Jul 16, 1919 | Jun 15, 1934 |
| Young | La Plata | | Nov 07, 1882 | Mar 19, 1883 |
| Yuma (Note: Yuma served as the original seat of Yuma County, Colorado, from its creation on March 15, 1889, until 1902.) | Yuma | 80759 | Nov 24, 1885 | open |

== Z ==
Select the OpenStreetMap link at the right to view the location of some of the post offices in this section.

| Post office | Current county | ZIP Code | Date opened | Date closed |
|---|---|---|---|---|
| Zapato | Alamosa | | Apr 30, 1879 | Jun 12, 1880 |
| Zapato | Alamosa | | Jun 22, 1880 | Sep 07, 1898 |
| Zapato | Alamosa | | Sep 14, 1898 | Sep 15, 1900 |
| Zilar | Weld | | May 05, 1892 | Oct 30, 1894 |
| Zirkel | Jackson | | May 05, 1899 | Dec 30, 1911 |
| Zita (Note: The Zita, Colorado, post office was renamed Galeton on September 16, 1910.) | Weld | 80622 | Feb 21, 1910 | Sep 16, 1910 |
| Zuck (Note: The Zuck, Colorado, post office was renamed Barton on March 20, 1895.) | Prowers | | Dec 26, 1891 | Mar 20, 1895 |

Colorado post offices: A B C D E F G H I J K L M N O P Q R S T U V W X Y Z

== See also ==
- Bibliography of Colorado
- Geography of Colorado
- History of Colorado
- Index of Colorado-related articles
- List of Colorado-related lists
  - List of populated places in Colorado
    - List of census-designated places in Colorado
    - List of municipalities in Colorado
  - List of ZIP Codes in Colorado
- Outline of Colorado
  - United States Postal Service
    - United States Post Office Department
