= Paisaje, Colorado =

Unincorporated community in Conejos County, CO, USA

Coordinates: 37°04′04″N 106°03′38″W

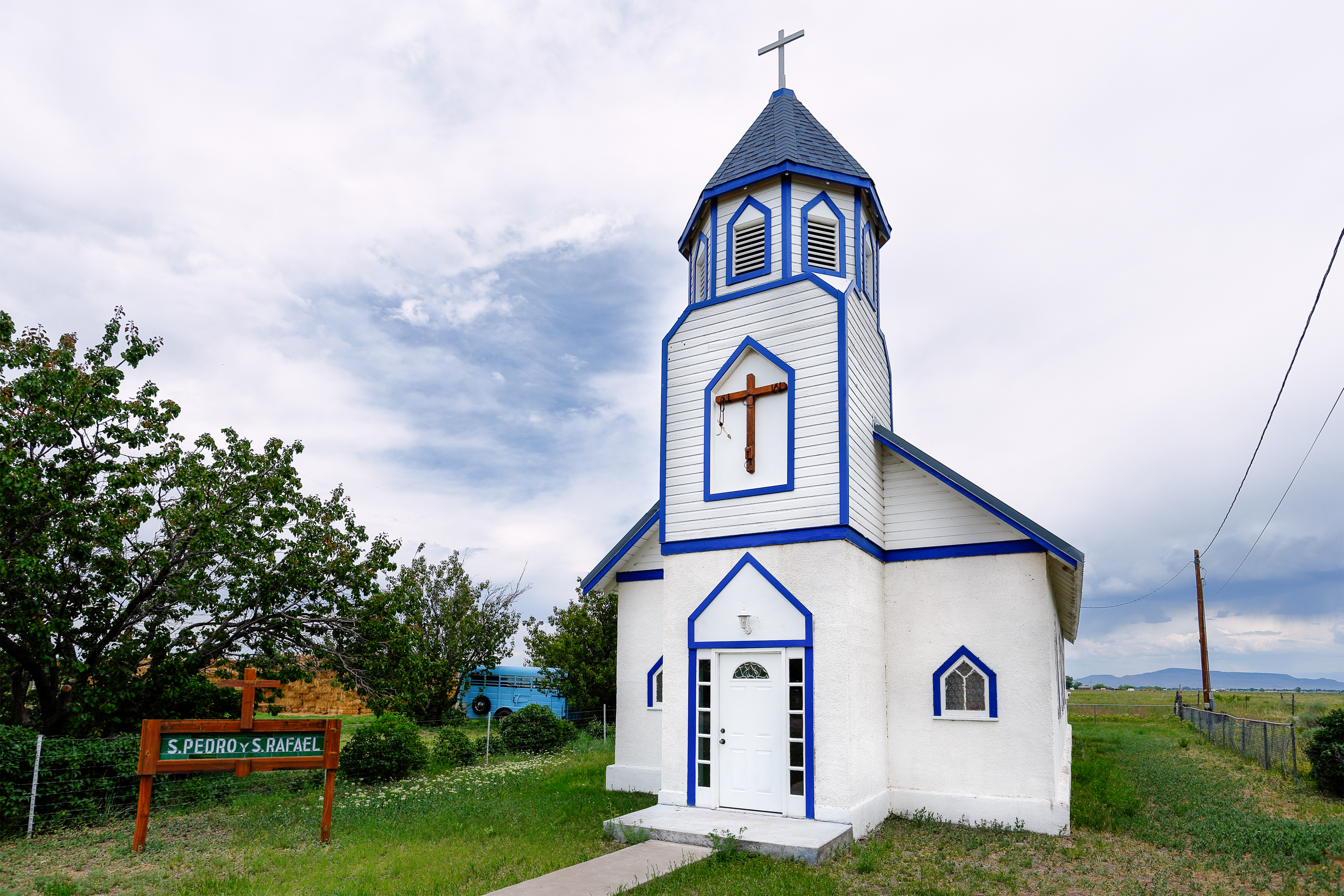
San Pedro & San Rafael Church

Paisaje is an unincorporated community in Conejos County, in the U.S. state of Colorado.

== History ==
A post office called Paisaje was established in 1906, and remained in operation until 1920. Paisaje is a name derived from Spanish meaning "pretty place".
