= Tyrone, Colorado =

Unincorporated community in Las Animas County, CO, USA

- Unincorporated community
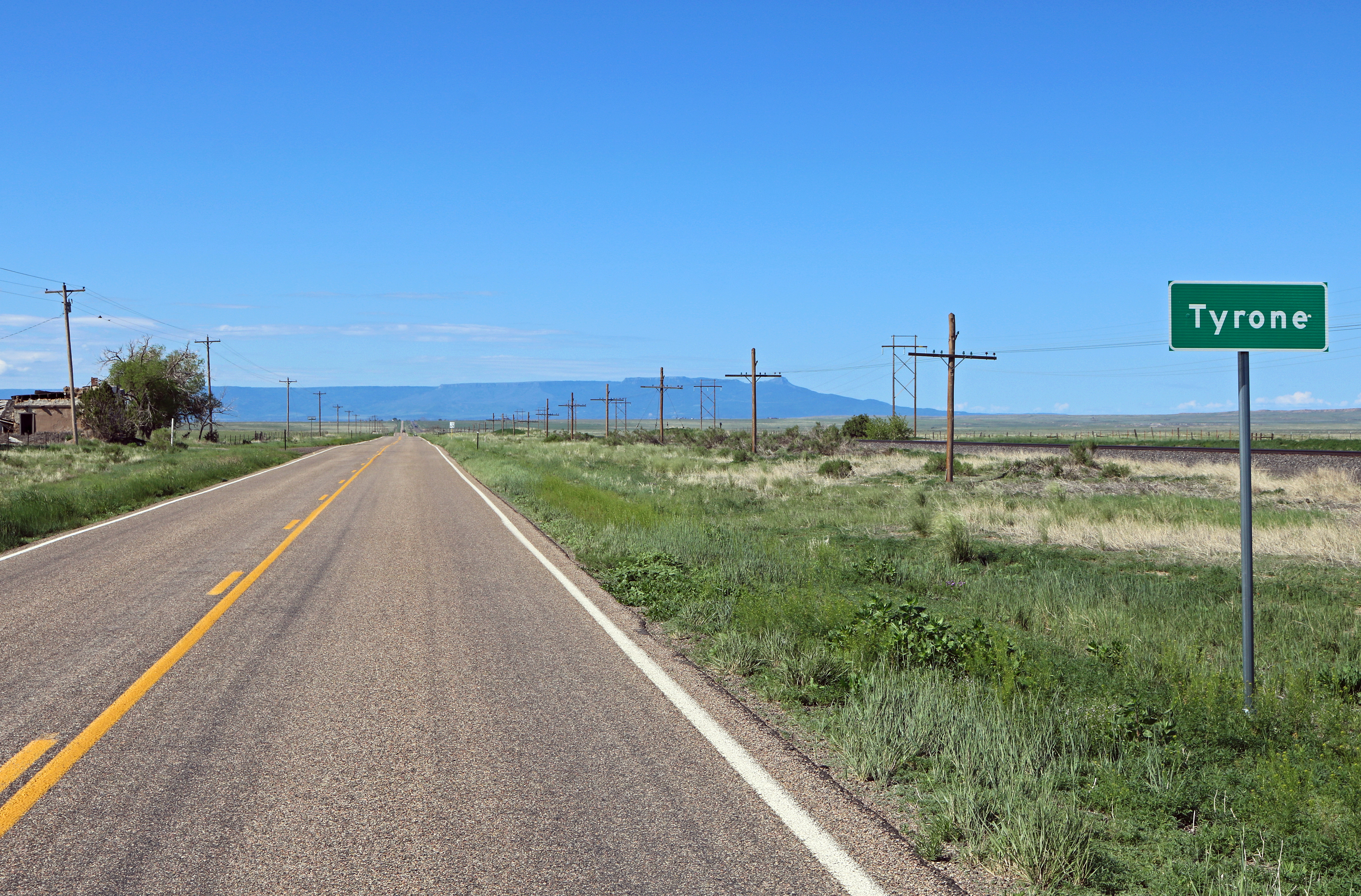
- Tyrone, looking southwest along U.S. Route 350, with Raton Mesa in the distance

- Location in Colorado Location in the United States
- Coordinates: 37°27′15″N 104°12′30″W
- Country: United States
- State: Colorado
- County: Las Animas County
- Elevation: 5,541 ft (1,689 m)
- Time zone: UTC-7 (MST)
  - Summer (DST): UTC-6 (MDT)
- ZIP code: 81059 (Model)
- Area code: 719
- GNIS feature ID: 204807

Tyrone is an unincorporated community located in Las Animas County, Colorado, United States. The U.S. Post Office at Model (ZIP Code 81059) now serves Tyrone postal addresses.

A post office called Tyrone was established in 1929, and remained in operation until 1968. The origin of the name Tyrone is obscure.
