= Foxton, Colorado =

Unincorporated community in Jefferson County, CO, USA

- Unincorporated community
- Location within Colorado Location within the United States
- Coordinates: 39°25′28″N 105°14′10″W
- Country: United States
- State: Colorado
- Counties: Jefferson
- Elevation: 6,457 ft (1,968 m)
- Time zone: UTC-7 (MST)
  - Summer (DST): UTC-6 (MDT)
- ZIP code: 80433 (Conifer)
- GNIS place ID: 204728

Foxton is an unincorporated community in Jefferson County, Colorado, United States. The U.S. Post Office at Conifer (ZIP Code 80433) now serves Foxton postal addresses.
