= Vulcan, Colorado =

Ghost town in Gunnison County, Colorado, United States

Vulcan
- Ghost town
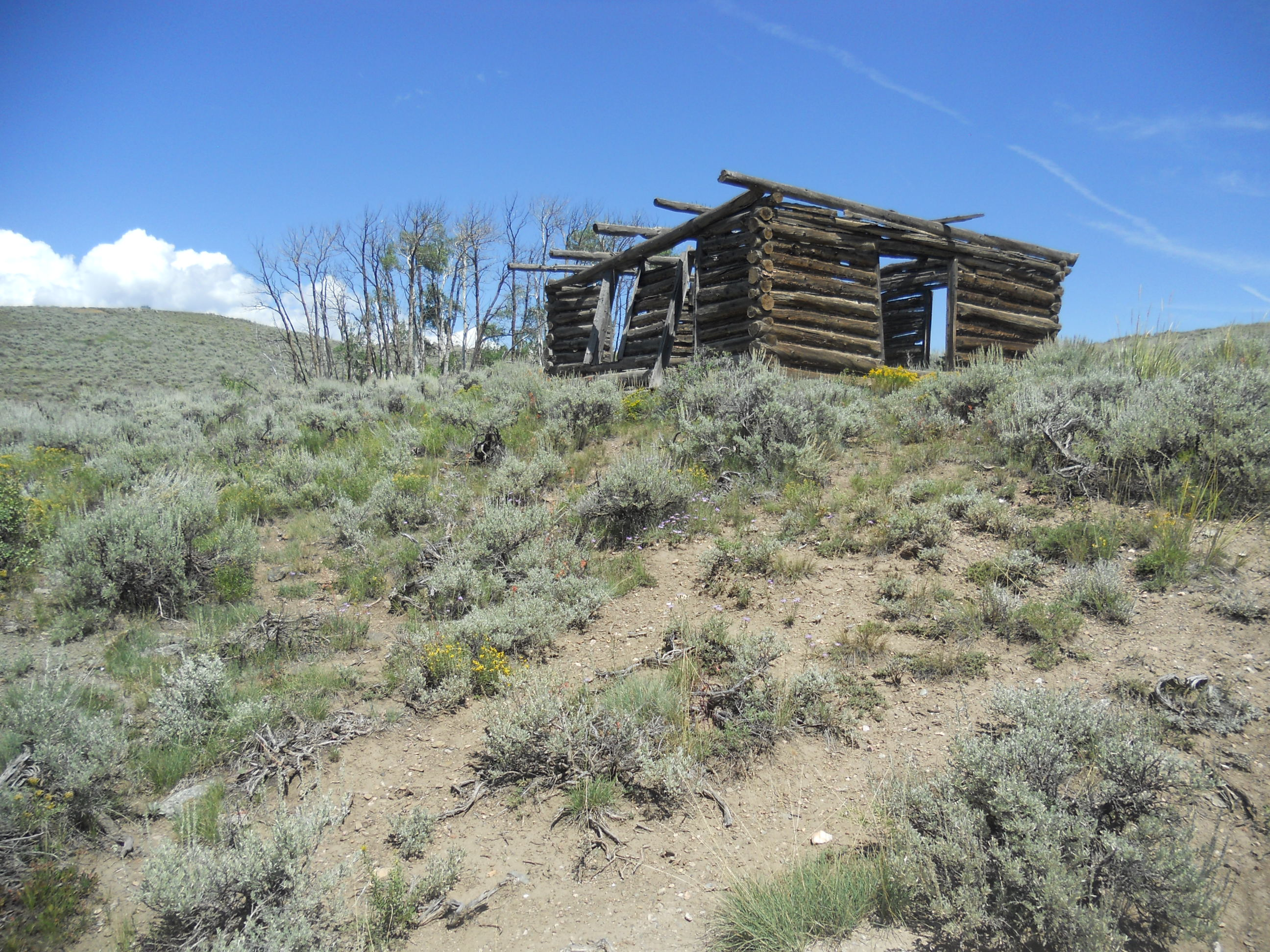
- Abandoned building in Vulcan, August 2017.

- Location within the state of Colorado Vulcan (the United States)
- Coordinates: 38°20′44″N 107°00′05″W
- Country: United States
- State: Colorado
- County: Gunnison
- Elevation: 8,920 ft (2,720 m)
- GNIS feature ID: 188360

Vulcan is a ghost town in Gunnison County, Colorado, United States, approximately 15 miles (24 km) southwest of the City of Gunnison. Vulcan was a mining camp established along Camp Creek in 1894 and was deserted within thirty years.

== History ==
In 1894, prospectors discovered gold in the sagebrush-covered hills in southern Gunnison County near the Saguache County line. Word spread quickly and within a year's time several mines were operating along what was termed the Vulcan vein. The mining camp of Vulcan grew rapidly and had a population of 500 by the summer of 1895. In March 1896, the town's first newspaper, the Vulcan Enterprise, was published.

The mines along the Vulcan vein were productive, with the Good Hope, Mammoth Chimney, and Vulcan seeing the most ore shipped. But life in Vulcan saw disruptions brought on by labor disputes between union workers and owners, litigation among the mine owners, problems associated with the high sulfur content of the rock, and destructive fires. It was just a few years before the mines began playing out. By 1906, essentially all gold, silver, and copper production had ceased.

The marketable sulfur deposits in the area extended Vulcan's life. Beginning in 1906, sulfur was mined and shipped until a catastrophic fire ended operations in 1910.

Vulcan received yet another pulse of activity when copper mining and smelting recommenced in 1916, but this activity was short lived and operations ceased by 1919. In 1920, Vulcan had a population of two. Today, only a few dilapidated structures remain.

== The Gunnison Gold Belt ==
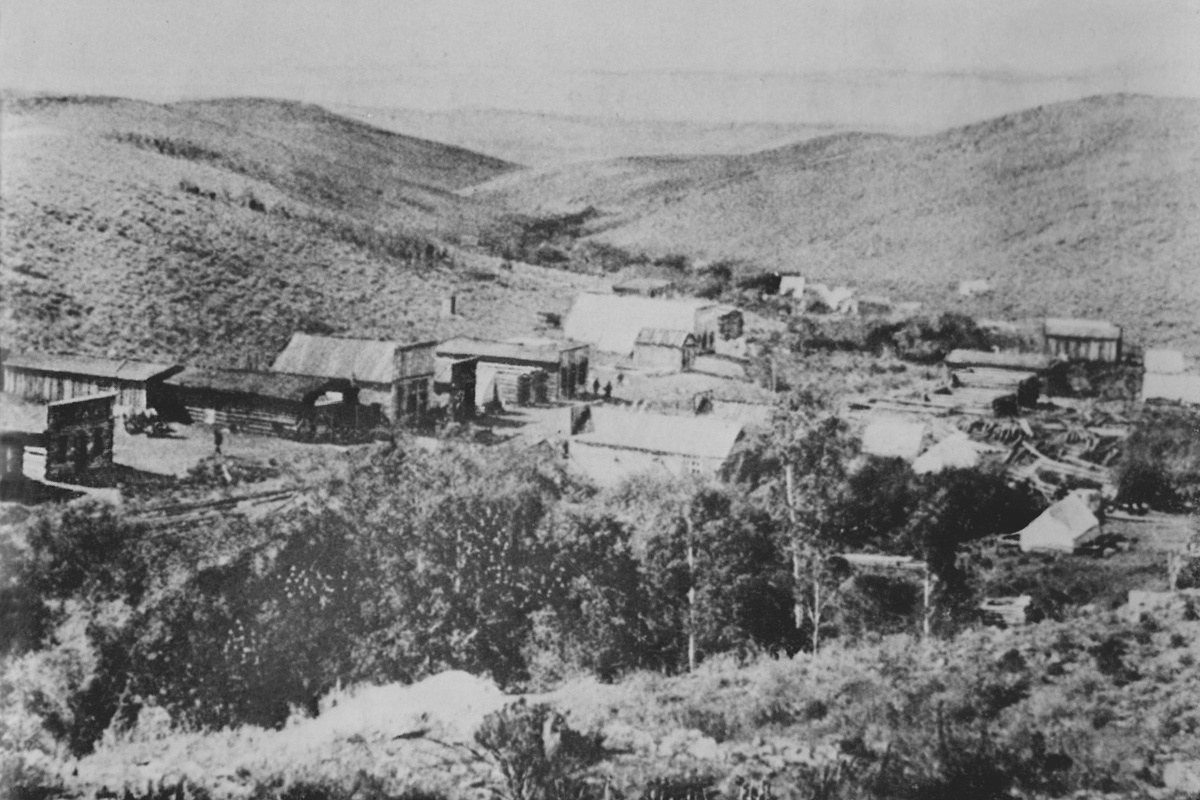
Vulcan, Colorado, circa 1896.

Vulcan was the most productive mining town to appear along the Gunnison Gold Belt, a gold-rich greenstone belt that spans over 25 miles (40 km) across southern Gunnison County and adjacent Saguache County. Multiple gold strikes resulted in mining operations and short-lived mining camps throughout the belt. The camps included Camp Willard (established in 1880), Cochetopa (1880), Dubois (1892), Spencer (1893), Midway (1894), Vulcan (1894), Iris (1894), Chance (1894), Taliafaro (1895), and Sillsville (1903). These towns grew rapidly after a strike, were occupied by hundreds of residents within months, and were often abandoned just as quickly. Saloons, boarding houses, general stores were common. Many had post offices and some had schools. The camps were a combination of wooden and tent buildings so enduring structures are rare. All of these camps are now abandoned and time has wiped away evidence of their once robust existence.

== See also ==
- List of ghost towns in Colorado
- Vulcanite
- Boomtown
