= Russell, Colorado =

Unincorporated community in Costilla County, Colorado, US

Coordinates: 37°33′19″N 105°17′16″W

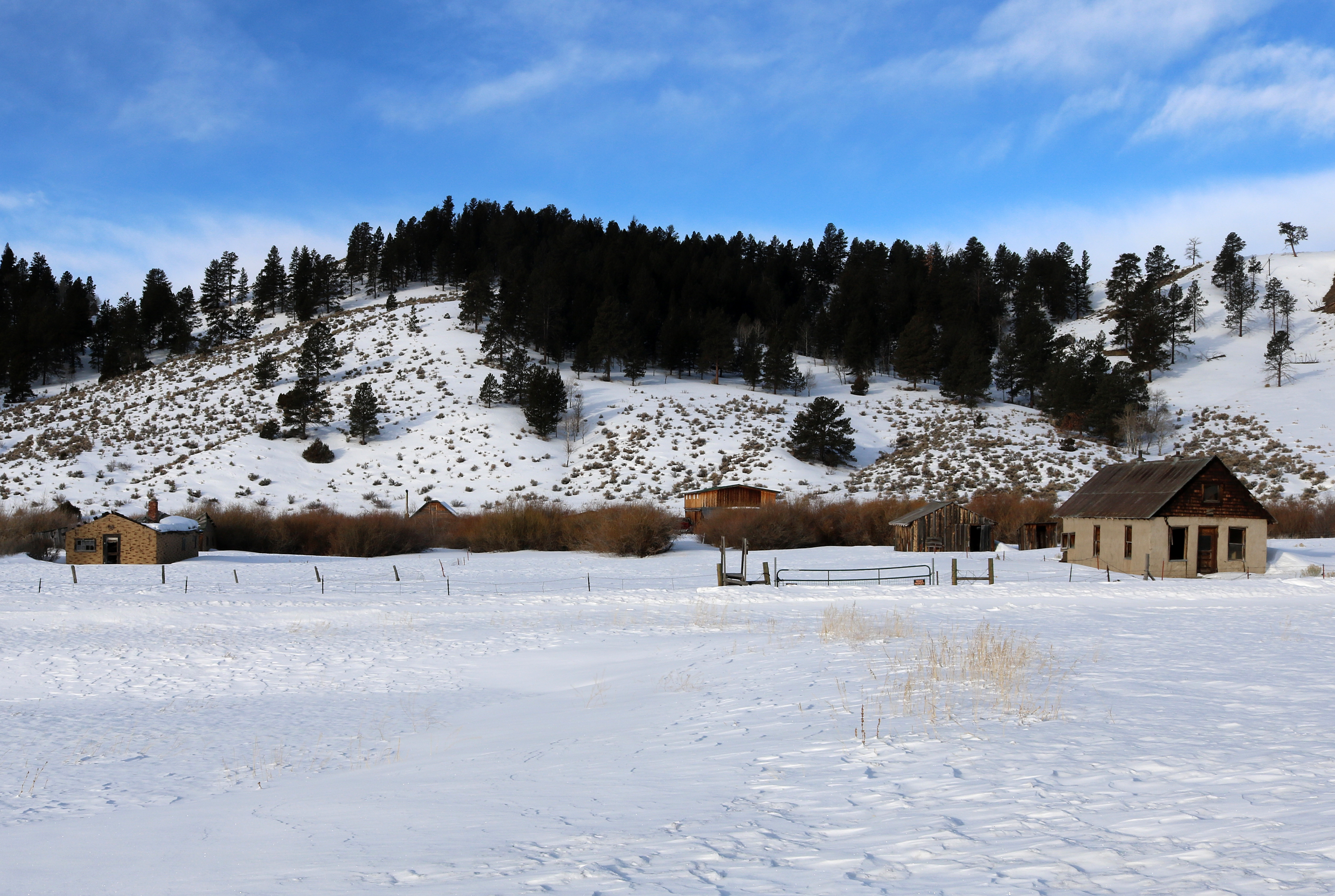
Russell in early 2020

Russell is an unincorporated community in Costilla County, in the U.S. state of Colorado. Its elevation is 8,428 feet (2,569 meters).

== History ==
A post office called Russell was in operation between 1876 and 1956. The community was named after William Greeneberry Russell, a prospector.
