= Stout, Colorado =

Former town in Colorado, United States

Coordinates: 40.5265°N 105.1577°W

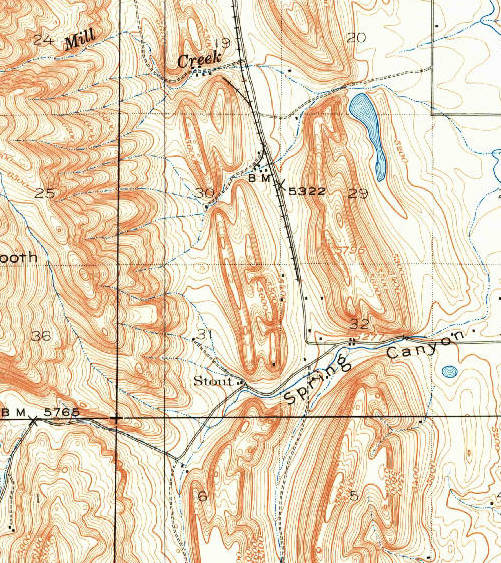
Stout as mapped in 1906

Stout is a former town in southern Larimer County, Colorado, United States. The town was located in foothills southwest of Fort Collins, just west of the Dakota Hogback. It was established in the 1860s as a camp for workers at the nearby stone quarries in the area. The Union Pacific Railroad invested in quarrying operation in the valley around the town, and at one time Colorado and Southern Railway built a spur of their rail line from Fort Collins up to the town in order to transport stone for its own use. During its time of operation, Stout was also as a spot for the residents of the nearby town of Fort Collins to buy libations. Fort Collins had a 70 year old prohibition, preventing them from acquiring alcohol in their own. Due to transportation routes made for the stone quarry, it was easy for residents of Fort Collins to travel to Stout. These trips would end in excessive drunkenness, causing outrage from Fort Collins and Stout city officials, who worried about drunk drivers being a danger on the roads.

The town was abandoned in 1949 to make way for the inundation of the valley by Horsetooth Reservoir as part of the Colorado-Big Thompson Project. Some of the former town site is located under the southern end of the reservoir. In recent decades, a small community has developed around the south edge of the reservoir, locally known as "South Bay". A sign at the southern end of the reservoir somewhat whimsically proclaims the area as "Stout, population 47-1/2", although the designation is not official it is used by most residents of Fort Collins.
