= Vallecito, Colorado =

Unincorporated community in La Plata County, CO, USA

Coordinates: 37°22′31″N 107°35′02″W

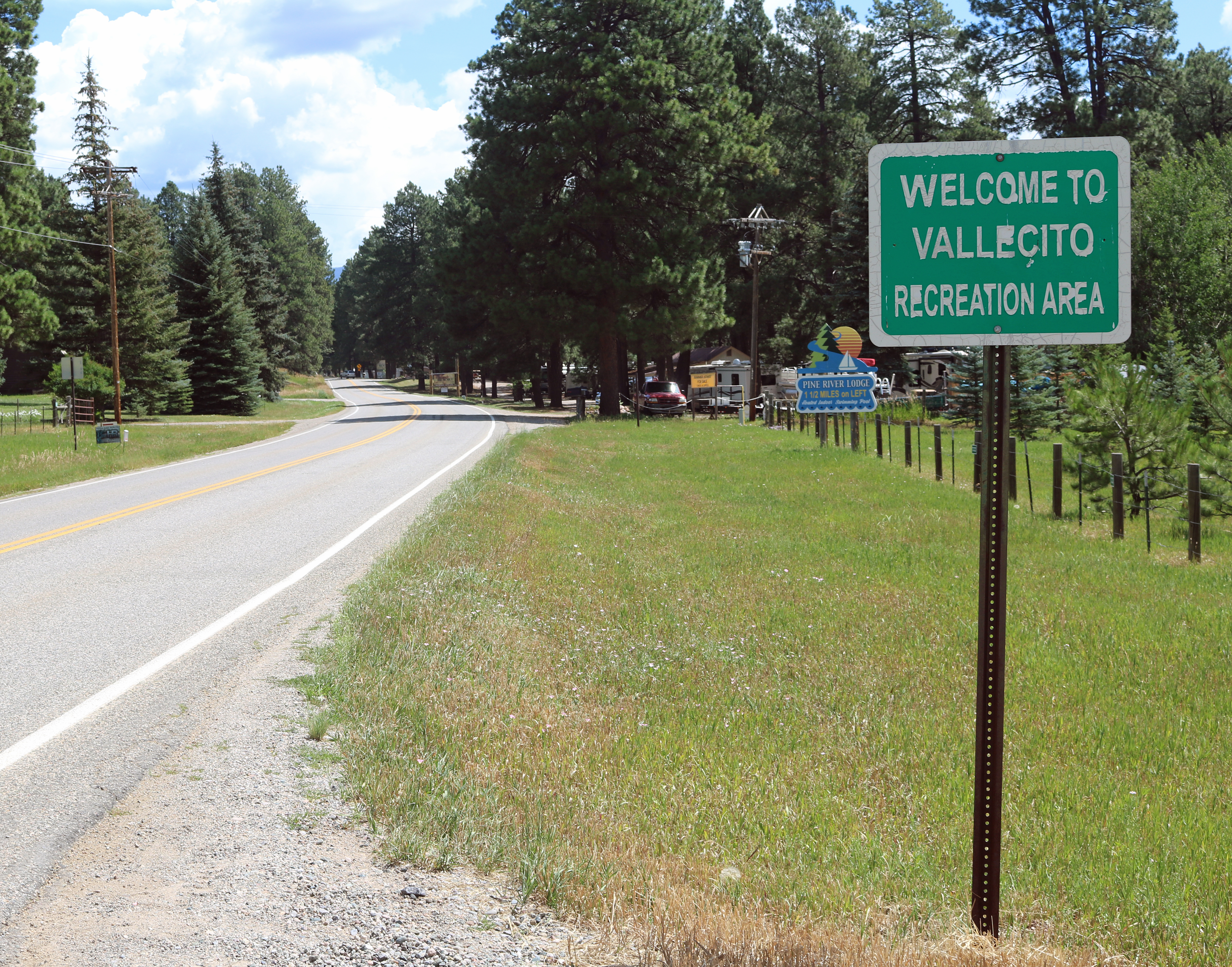
Entering Vallecito from the south on County Road 501

Vallecito is an unincorporated community in La Plata County, Colorado, United States.

== History ==
A post office called Vallecito was in operation between 1901 and 1942. Vallecito is a name derived from Spanish meaning "little valley".

== See also ==
- Vallecito Dam
