= Pagosa Junction, Colorado =

Ghost town in Archuleta County, Colorado, United States

Pagosa Junction Gato
- Ghost town
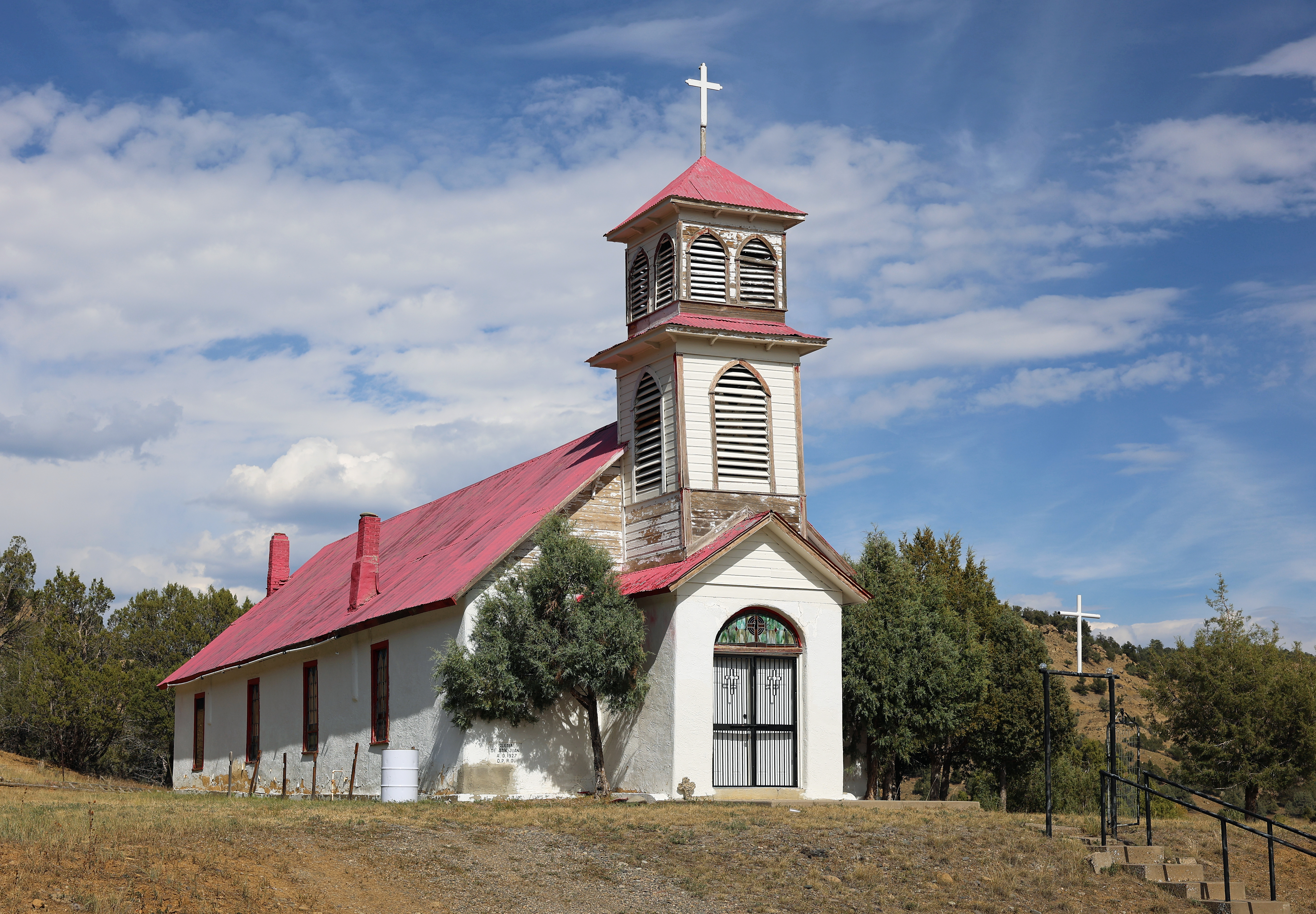
- St. John the Baptist Mission Church in Pagosa Junction (2024)

- Location within the state of Colorado
- Coordinates: 37°2′17.02″N 107°11′57.15″W
- Country: United States
- State: Colorado
- County: Archuleta
- Founded: 1881 (as Gato), 1899 (as Pagosa Junction)
- Elevation: 6,267 ft (1,910 m)
- Time zone: UTC-7 (Mountain (MST))
  - Summer (DST): UTC-6 (MDT)

Pagosa Junction, elevation 6,267 feet (1,910 meters), is a railroad ghost town in Archuleta County, Colorado, U.S.

== History ==
Originally established as a stop on the Denver and Rio Grande Western Railroad's Alamosa–Durango line (also called the San Juan Extension), the location was originally called Gato when a station house was first built there in 1881.

In 1899-1900 a branch railroad line called the Rio Grande, Pagosa, and Northern Railroad was built between Gato and Pagosa Springs, Colorado. It was a logging railroad, bringing timber and lumber from the Pagosa Springs area to the main line in Gato. In 1899, as the population grew to 200 people, a post office was built in Gato, and the name was changed to Pagosa Junction.

By 1930, Pagosa Junction's population had grown to 447. However, the branch to Pagosa Springs closed in the 1930s, and the town's population began to decline. Today, completely abandoned, some of the town's buildings remain, including St. John the Baptist Mission Church, located on a hill above the town. It was built on the hill in 1927, replacing two earlier churches — the first built in 1911 — that were destroyed by floods on the San Juan River that flows through the town.

The town now lies on Southern Ute Indian Reservation land. County Road 500 (Trujillo Road) goes through the town.
