= Molina, Colorado =

Unincorporated community in Mesa County, CO, USA

- Unincorporated community
- Location within Colorado Location within the United States
- Coordinates: 39°09′59″N 108°08′20″W
- Country: United States
- State: Colorado
- County: Mesa
- Elevation: 5,601 ft (1,707 m)

Population (2020)
  - Total: 189
- Time zone: UTC-7 (MST)
  - Summer (DST): UTC-6 (MDT)
- ZIP code: 81646
- Area code: 970
- GNIS feature ID: 204661

Molina is an unincorporated community in Mesa County, Colorado, United States. The Molina Post Office has the ZIP Code 81646. The population was 189 in the 2020 United States Census.
