= Vroman, Colorado =

Unincorporated community in Otero County, CO, USA

Coordinates: 38°05′23″N 103°48′37″W

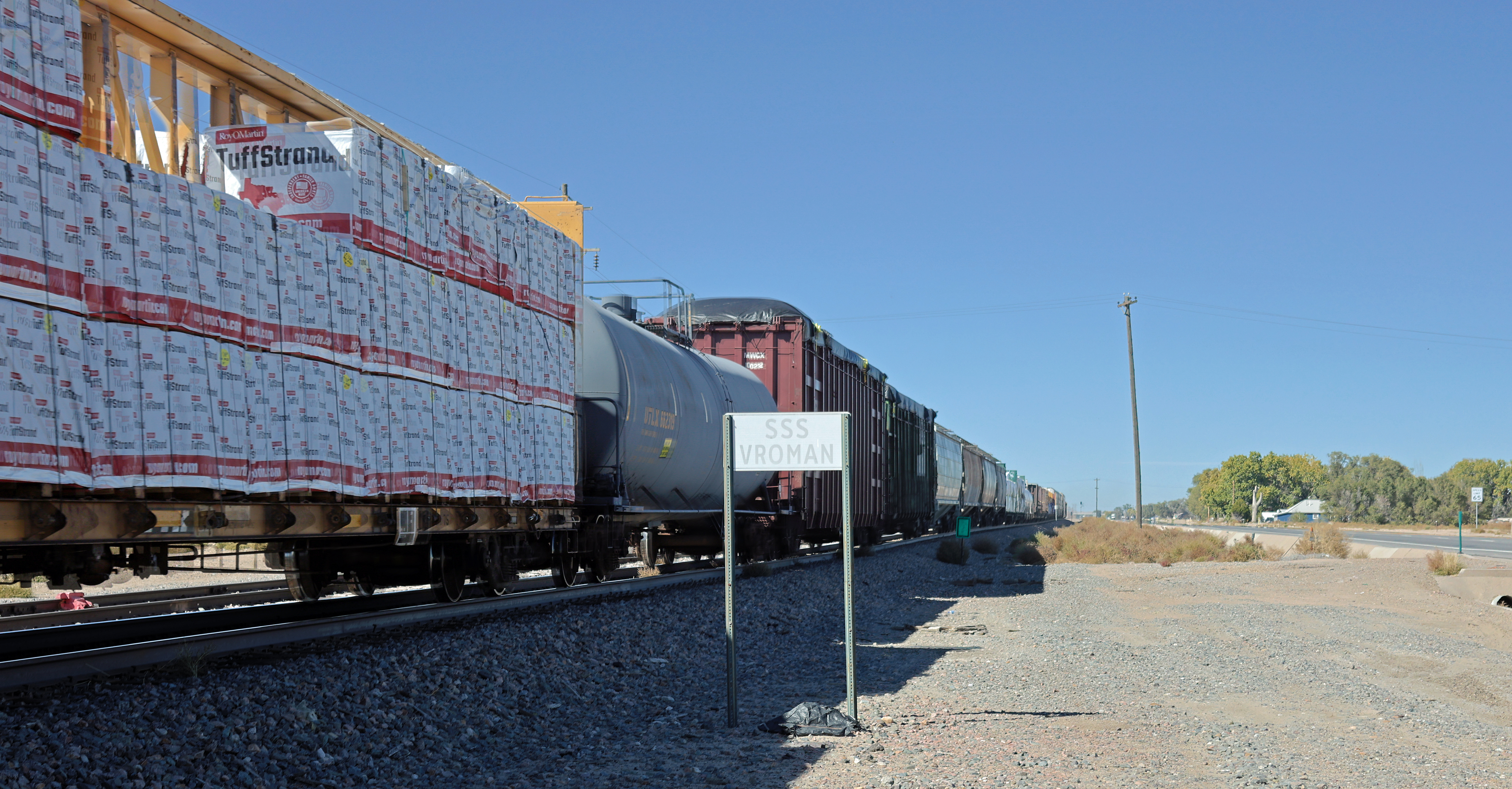
A train passing through Vroman (2023)

Vroman is an unincorporated community in Otero County, in the U.S. state of Colorado.

== History ==
The settlement was founded around 1891. A variant name was Weitzer, named after a local beet sugar factory manager named Frederick Weitzer. A post office called Weitzer was established in 1908, the name was changed to Vroman in 1918, due to anti-German sentiment during World War I, and the post office closed in 1954. The community has the name of John C. Vroman, a local pioneer, businessman, and Otero County commissioner.

In 1930, Vroman reached its highest-ever population of 605 people, with its population crashing during the Great Depression. The Vroman School closed in 1971, and the site of the community is now a ghost town. The school building, built in 1918 in the Mediterranean Revival style by architects Frederick Mountjoy and Frank W. Frewen, was listed on the Colorado State Register of Historic Properties but was destroyed by fire in 2005.
