= National Register of Historic Places listings in Routt County, Colorado =

Location of Routt County in Colorado

This is a list of the National Register of Historic Places listings in Routt County, Colorado.

This is intended to be a complete list of the properties and districts on the National Register of Historic Places in Routt County, Colorado, United States. The locations of National Register properties and districts for which the latitude and longitude coordinates are included below, may be seen in a map.

There are 27 properties and districts listed on the National Register in the county. Another property was once listed but has been removed.

This National Park Service list is complete through NPS recent listings posted September 12, 2025.

== Current listings ==
	Name on the Register	Image	Date listed	Location	City or town	Description
1	Antlers Cafe and Bar	Antlers Cafe and Bar	May 27, 2014 (#14000251)	40 and 46 Moffat Ave. 40°09′01″N 106°54′31″W	Yampa	
2	Bell and Canant Mercantile-Crossan's M and A Market	Bell and Canant Mercantile-Crossan's M and A Market	December 26, 2012 (#12001081)	101 Main St. 40°09′05″N 106°54′31″W	Yampa	
3	Bell Mercantile	Bell Mercantile	June 7, 1990 (#90000871)	101-111 Moffat Ave. 40°16′32″N 106°57′22″W	Oak Creek	
4	Chamber of Commerce Building	Chamber of Commerce Building	April 16, 2010 (#08001010)	1201 Lincoln Ave. 40°29′20″N 106°50′21″W	Steamboat Springs	
5	Christian Science Society Building	Christian Science Society Building	August 22, 2007 (#07000839)	641 Oak St. 40°29′10″N 106°49′55″W	Steamboat Springs	
6	Columbine	Columbine	August 7, 2007 (#07000791)	645 Routt County Rd. 129; 40°51′18″N 106°57′55″W	Clark	
7	Crawford House	Crawford House	August 7, 2005 (#05000782)	1184 Crawford Ave. 40°29′27″N 106°50′12″W	Steamboat Springs	
8	Dawson-Carpenter Ranch	Dawson-Carpenter Ranch	May 6, 1998 (#97000047)	13250 W. U.S. Route 40; 40°29′40″N 107°10′58″W	Hayden	
9	Farwell Ditch		August 22, 2025 (#100012148)	Routt National Forest	Hahn's Peak	
10	First National Bank Building	First National Bank Building	January 11, 2001 (#00001624)	803-807 Lincoln Ave., and 57½ 8th St. 40°29′10″N 106°50′04″W	Steamboat Springs	
11	Foidel Canyon School	Foidel Canyon School	May 9, 1983 (#83001332)	Northwest of Oak Creek; 40°21′24″N 107°03′18″W	Oak Creek	
12	Hahns Peak Schoolhouse	Hahns Peak Schoolhouse	February 15, 1974 (#74000594)	Main St. 40°48′23″N 106°56′40″W	Hahns Peak Village	One-room schoolhouse which operated from 1912 to 1943
13	Hayden Co-Operative Elevator Company	Hayden Co-Operative Elevator Company	October 23, 2015 (#15000740)	198 E. Lincoln Ave. 40°29′48″N 107°15′26″W	Hayden	
14	Hayden Depot	Hayden Depot	October 22, 1992 (#92001409)	300 W. Pearl St. 40°29′47″N 107°15′36″W	Hayden	
15	Hayden Rooming House	Hayden Rooming House	September 17, 1999 (#99001144)	295 S. Poplar St. 40°29′32″N 107°15′31″W	Hayden	
16	Kimsey-Bolten Ranch Rural Historic Landscape	Kimsey-Bolten Ranch Rural Historic Landscape	November 28, 2012 (#12000972)	41090 County Road 80; 40°30′54″N 107°15′03″W	Hayden	
17	Maxwell Building	Maxwell Building	September 29, 1995 (#95001148)	840 Lincoln Ave. 40°29′12″N 106°50′03″W	Steamboat Springs	
18	Mesa Schoolhouse	Mesa Schoolhouse	November 1, 2007 (#07001113)	33985 S. U.S. Highway 40; 40°24′45″N 106°48′22″W	Steamboat Springs	
19	Perry-Mansfield School of Theatre and Dance	Perry-Mansfield School of Theatre and Dance	July 14, 1995 (#95000794)	40755 Routt County Road 36; 40°30′33″N 106°49′34″W	Steamboat Springs	
20	Rock Creek Stage Station		October 21, 1982 (#82004860)	East of Toponas off State Highway 134; 40°03′27″N 106°38′42″W	Toponas	
21	Routt County National Bank Building	Routt County National Bank Building	May 20, 2002 (#02000538)	802-806 Lincoln Ave. 40°29′11″N 106°50′02″W	Steamboat Springs	
22	Solandt Memorial Hospital	Solandt Memorial Hospital	August 10, 2011 (#11000521)	150 W. Jackson St. 40°29′37″N 107°15′24″W	Hayden	
23	Steamboat Apartments	Steamboat Apartments	December 7, 2011 (#11000877)	302 11th St. 40°29′23″N 106°50′10″W	Steamboat Springs	
24	Steamboat Laundry Building	Steamboat Laundry Building	August 7, 2007 (#07000790)	127 and 131 11th St. 40°29′12″N 106°50′07″W	Steamboat Springs	
25	Steamboat Springs Depot	Steamboat Springs Depot	December 20, 1978 (#78000884)	39265 Routt County Road 33B; 40°29′21″N 106°50′31″W	Steamboat Springs	
26	Steamboat Springs Downtown Historic District	Steamboat Springs Downtown Historic District	July 11, 2014 (#14000387)	Lincoln Ave. roughly bounded by 5th to 11th Sts. 40°29′09″N 106°50′01″W	Steamboat Springs	
27	Summit Creek Ranger Station	Summit Creek Ranger Station	July 28, 2004 (#04000735)	County Road 129; 40°58′47″N 106°58′34″W	Columbine	

== Former listing ==
	Name on the Register	Image	Date listed	Date removed	Location	City or town	Description
1	Four Mile Bridge	Four Mile Bridge	February 4, 1985 (#85000237)	July 22, 1994	County Road 42 over Elk River	Steamboat Springs	Replaced in 1989.

== See also ==
- List of National Historic Landmarks in Colorado
- List of National Register of Historic Places in Colorado
- Bibliography of Colorado
- Geography of Colorado
- History of Colorado
- Index of Colorado-related articles
- List of Colorado-related lists
- Outline of Colorado
