= Columbine, Routt County, Colorado =

Unincorporated community in Colorado, US

Columbine, Colorado
- Unincorporated community
- Location of Columbine, Colorado. Columbine (Colorado)
- Coordinates: 40°51′15″N 106°57′57″W
- Country: United States
- State: Colorado
- County: Routt

Government
  - Type: unincorporated community
  - Body: Routt County
- Elevation: 8,701 ft (2,652 m)
- Time zone: UTC−07:00 (MST)
  - Summer (DST): UTC−06:00 (MDT)
- Area codes: 970/748
- GNIS place ID: 170461
- GNIS feature ID: 170461

- Columbine
- U.S. National Register of Historic Places
- U.S. Historic district
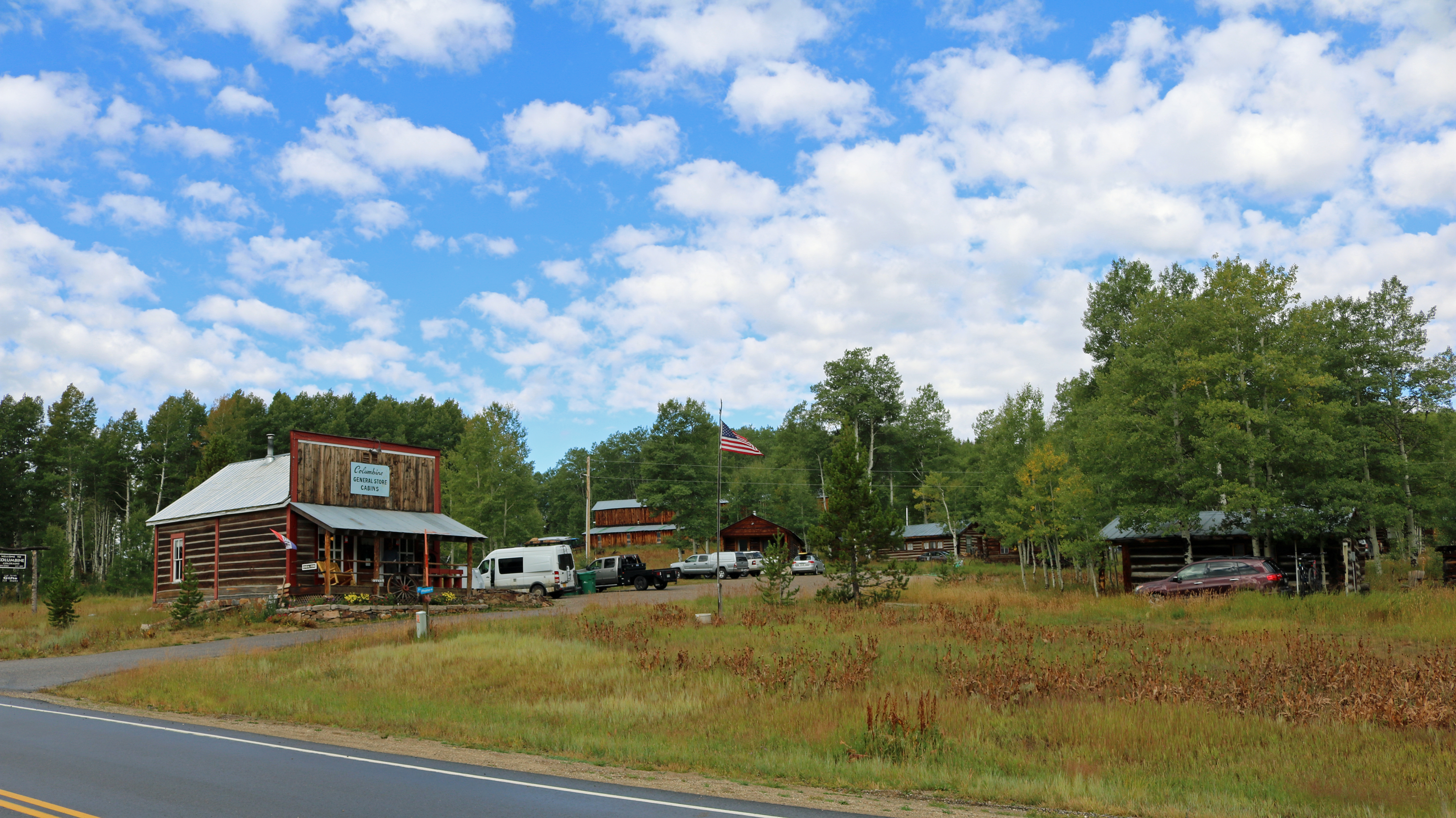
- Columbine, Colorado
- Nearest city: Clark, Colorado
- Coordinates: 40.8550°N 106.9653°E
- Area: 5.2 acres (2.1 ha)
- Built: c. 1895
- Built by: James R. Caron; Ross Crossley; Robert Lundquist; Leonard Juel
- Architectural style: Late 19th and Early 20th Century American Movements, Pioneer Log Rustic
- NRHP reference No.: 07000791
- Added to NRHP: August 7, 2007

Columbine, or the Columbine Gold Camp, is a former gold mining community in Routt County, Colorado, United States. Now it is an unincorporated community, historic district, and a rental cabin resort. It was listed as a historic district on the National Register of Historic Places in 2007.

== History ==
Columbine was established in 1895. The Columbine, Colorado, post office operated from June 5, 1896, until May 19, 1967. The Clark, Colorado, post office (ZIP code 80428) now serves the area.

== Geography ==
Columbine is located in Routt County at an elevation 8,701 feet (2,652 m).

== Description ==
The historic register listing gave the community a bit of a boost. The listing included 20 contributing buildings and a contributing structure on 5.2 acres (2.1 ha).

Specific buildings include:

- General Store / Columbine Mercantile Store (1898). Built by James R. Caron, a store and post office from 1898 to 1967, a Conoco gas station from 1915 to 1967. Now the registration office for cabin rentals.
- Oil House (c.1915). Built by James R. Caron, it was used to store kerosene sold in the general store.
- Skiers Cabin (c.1895), which served as "Hitter's Mercantile" before James Caron purchased the property and moved the store in 1898 to the Columbine Mercantile building. One-story north-facing front-gabled log building with daubing, with notched corners at the north end and with metal roof installed in 1994 that extends out from the south end to two timber posts. Although altered, has historic integrity.
- Skiers Cabin Woodshed (1940s). One of two woodsheds built by Ross Crossley, a log building with notching and with a flat metal roof.

About 20 more buildings and structures exist.

Columbine is located in the Sierra Madre Mountains (of Colorado and Wyoming) about 5 miles (8.0 km) northwest of Hahns Peak Village and 30 miles (48 km) north of Steamboat Springs, Colorado, with a good view of Hahns Peak.

It is a populated place; also 14 cabins are available for rent, billed as 1800s gold miner cabins.

== See also ==
- List of ghost towns in Colorado
- List of populated places in Colorado
- List of post offices in Colorado
- National Register of Historic Places listings in Routt County, Colorado
