= Steamboat Lake =

Steamboat Lake may refer to:

- Steamboat Lake (Cass and Hubbard counties, Minnesota)
- Steamboat Lake State Park, a state park in Colorado
