= Rock Creek Stage Station =

- U.S. National Register of Historic Places
- Location within Colorado
- Nearest city: Toponas, Colorado
- Coordinates: 40°03′27″N 106°38′42″W
- Area: less than one acre
- Built: 1880
- NRHP reference No.: 82004860
- Added to NRHP: October 21, 1982

The Rock Creek Stage Station, in Routt County, Colorado near Toponas, Colorado.

It is a three-bay, two-story log building, built around 1880. It was listed on the National Register of Historic Places in 1982.

It is at Gore Pass and has also been known as the Gore Pass Stage Station.

It is east of Toponas, Colorado off Colorado State Highway 134.
