= McCoy, Colorado =

Census-designated place in Eagle County, CO, USA

- Census-designated place
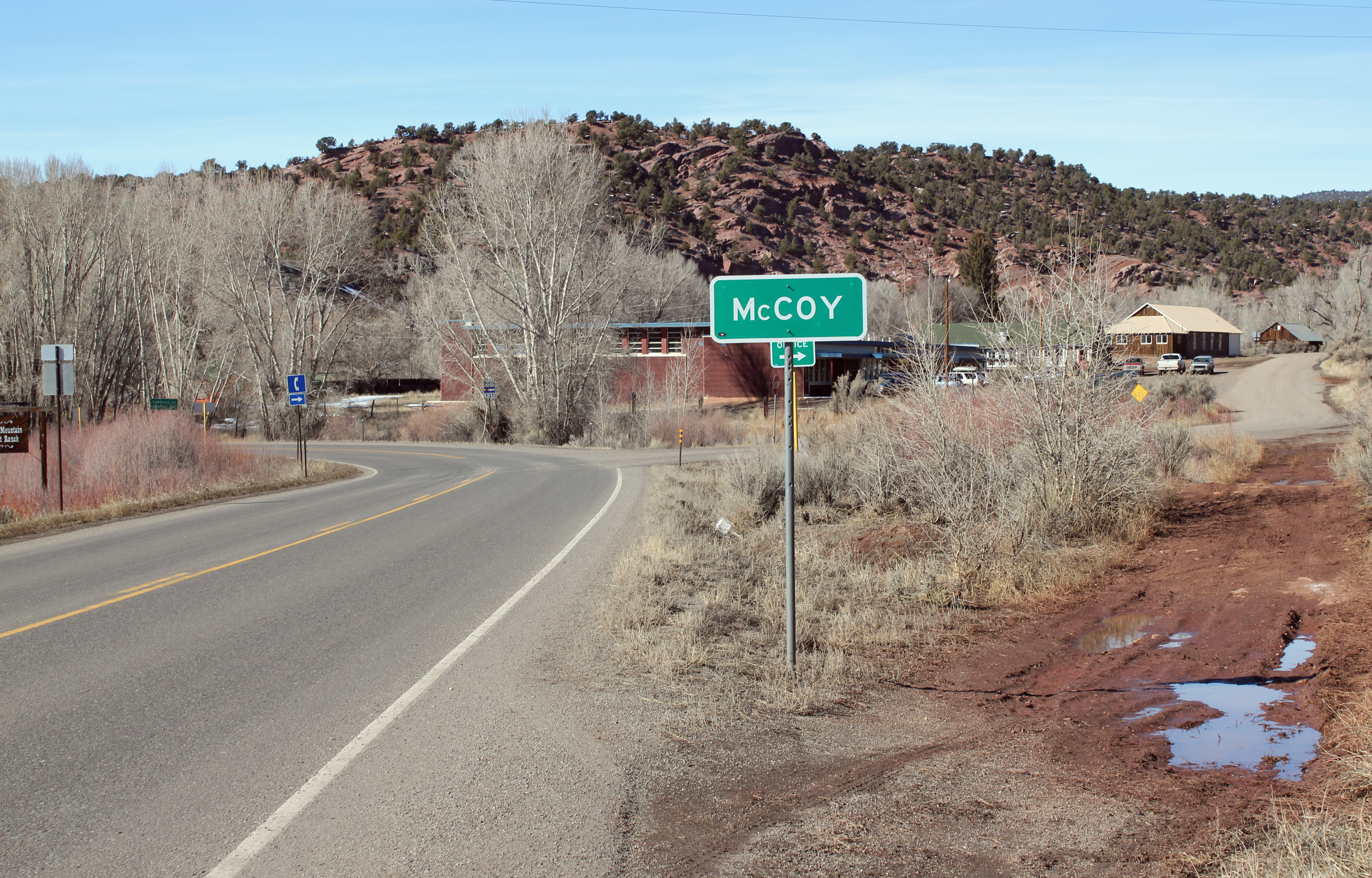
- Entering McCoy

- Location of the McCoy CDP in Eagle County, Colorado
- Coordinates: 39°54′52″N 106°43′33″W
- Country: United States
- State: Colorado
- County: Eagle County

Area
  - Total: 0.294 sq mi (0.761 km^{2})
  - Land: 0.294 sq mi (0.761 km^{2})
  - Water: 0 sq mi (0.000 km^{2})
- Elevation: 6,683 ft (2,037 m)

Population (2020)
  - Total: 30
  - Density: 100/sq mi (39/km^{2})
- Time zone: UTC-7 (MST)
  - Summer (DST): UTC-6 (MDT)
- ZIP Code: 80463
- Area code: 970
- GNIS feature: 2583263

McCoy is an unincorporated town, a census-designated place (CDP), and a post office located in and governed by Eagle County, Colorado, United States. The CDP is a part of the Edwards, CO Micropolitan Statistical Area. The McCoy post office has the ZIP Code 80463. At the United States Census 2020, the population of the McCoy CDP was 30.

== History ==
The McCoy Post Office has been in operation since 1891. The community was named after Charles H. McCoy, a cattleman.

== Geography ==
McCoy is located along the northern border of Eagle County in the valley of Rock Creek, less than one mile north of its mouth at the Colorado River. Colorado State Highway 131 passes through the community, leading south 20 miles (32 km) to Interstate 70 at Wolcott and north 52 miles (84 km) to Steamboat Springs.

The McCoy CDP has an area of 188 acres (0.761 km^{2}), all land.

== Demographics ==
The United States Census Bureau initially defined the McCoy CDP for the United States Census 2010.

McCoy CDP, Colorado
Year	Pop.	±%
2010	24	—
2020	30	+25.0%
Source: United States Census Bureau

== See also ==
- Colorado metropolitan areas
- Edwards, CO Micropolitan Statistical Area
