= Colorado State Highway 131 =

State highway in Colorado, United States

State Highway 131
- SH 131 highlighted in red

Route information
- Maintained by CDOT
- Length: 68.7 mi (110.6 km)

Major junctions
- South end: I-70 at Wolcott
- US 6 at Wolcott
- North end: US 40 near Steamboat Springs

Location
- Country: United States
- State: Colorado
- Counties: Eagle, Routt

Highway system
- Colorado State Highway System; Interstate; US; State; Scenic
← SH 128	→ SH 133

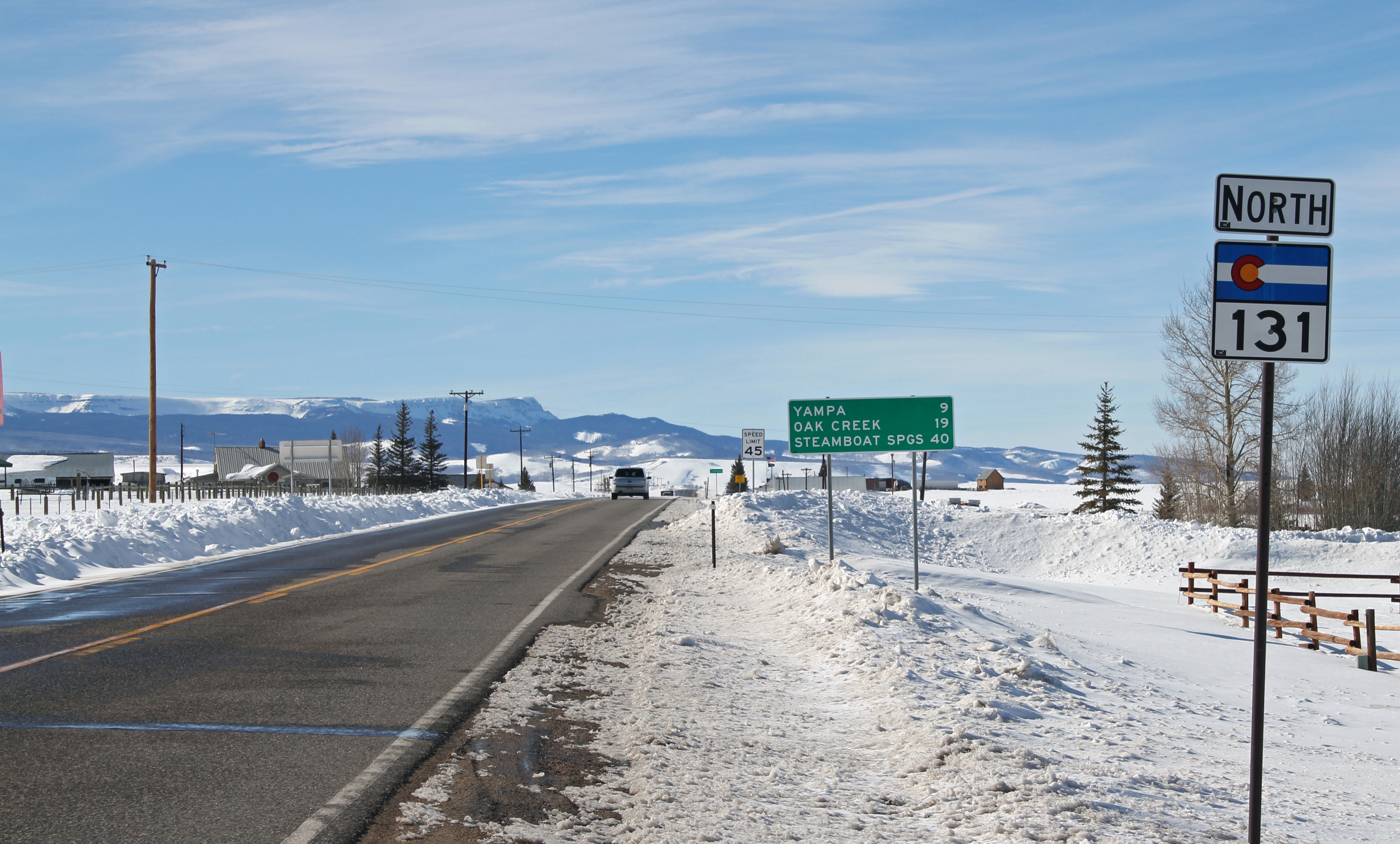
Highway 131 as it passes through Toponas, Colorado.

State Highway 131 (SH 131) is a 68.7 mi (110.6 km) long north–south state highway in the U.S. State of Colorado. SH 131's southern terminus is at Interstate 70 (I-70) in Wolcott, and the northern terminus is at U.S. Route 40 (US 40) 4 miles (6.4 km) east of Steamboat Springs. SH 131 travels through the towns of State Bridge, Bond, McCoy, Toponas, Yampa, and Oak Creek.

== History ==
The route was established in the 1920s, when it connected State Bridge to its current terminus at US 40. The route was then paved from its north end to Yampa by 1946. SH 11 (now moved) was deleted by 1954, giving the section from Wolcott to State Bridge to SH 131. The entire route was paved by 1970. SH 131 was then extended to I-70 in 1972.

== Major intersections ==
County	Location	mi	km	Destinations	Notes
Eagle		0.00	0.00	I-70 – Denver, Glenwood Springs	Southern terminus; I-70 exit 157; interchange
Eagle		0.32 0.00	0.51 0.00	US 6 east	Southern end of US 6 concurrency; mileposts reset
Eagle	Wolcott	0.05	0.080	US 6 west	Northern end of US 6 concurrency
Routt	Toponas	32.90	52.95	SH 134 east – Kremmling	Western terminus of SH 134
Routt		68.72	110.59	US 40 – Steamboat Springs, Kremmling	Northern terminus
1.000 mi = 1.609 km; 1.000 km = 0.621 mi: Concurrency terminus
