= Foidel Canyon School =

- U.S. National Register of Historic Places
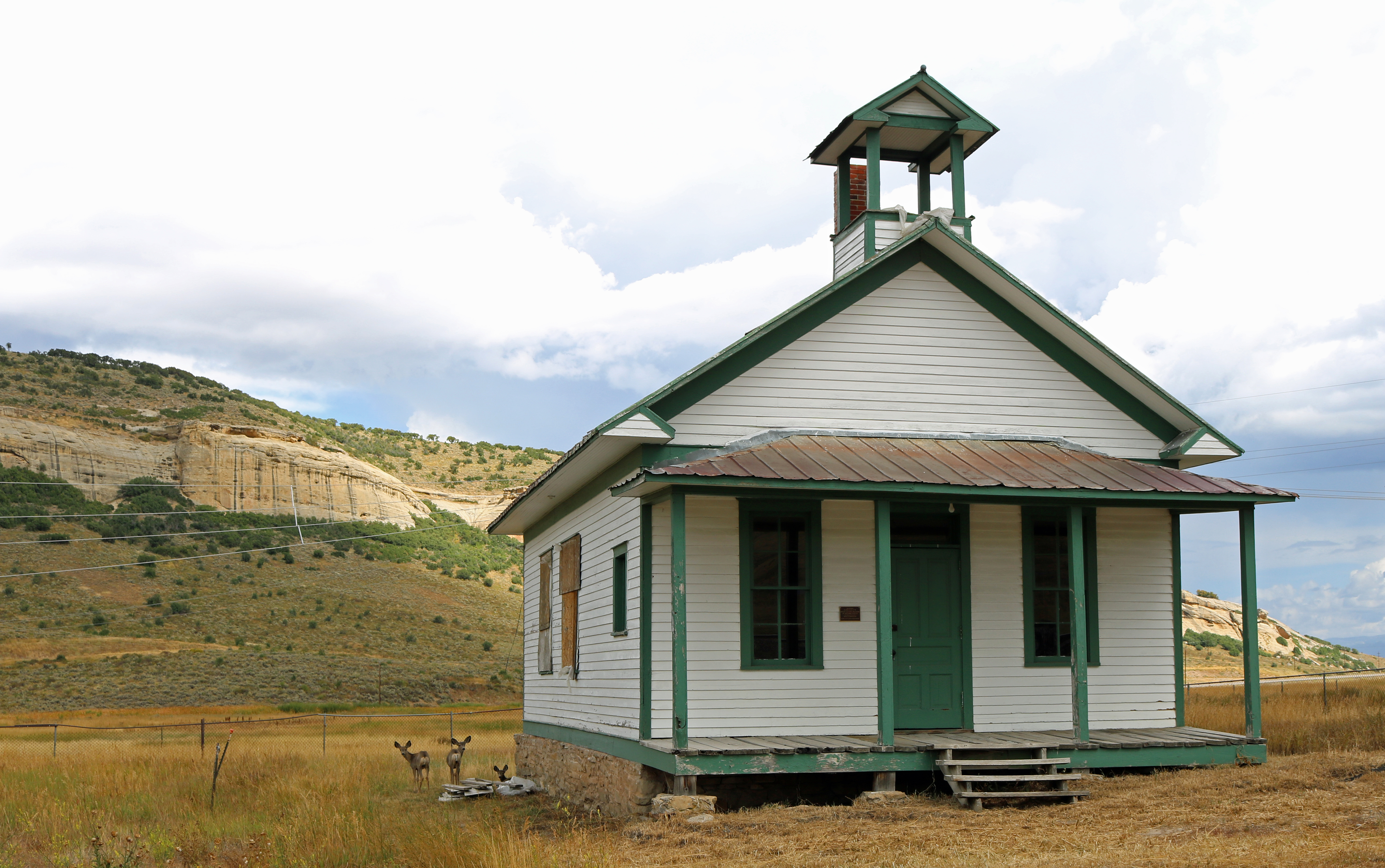

- Location within Colorado
- Nearest city: Oak Creek, Colorado
- Coordinates: 40°21′24″N 107°03′18″W
- Area: 1 acre (0.40 ha)
- Built: 1923
- MPS: Rural School Buildings in Colorado MPS
- NRHP reference No.: 83001332
- Added to NRHP: May 9, 1983

The Foidel Canyon School, in Routt County, Colorado northwest of Oak Creek, Colorado, is a one-room schoolhouse built in 1923. It was listed on the National Register of Historic Places in 1983.

It has also been known as Twentymile School. The schoolhouse is a one-story building about 25 by 35 feet (7.6 m × 10.7 m) in plan, built on a stone rubble foundation. It has a partially enclosed belfry but the bell was gone before 1982.

Two additional contributing buildings were a teacherage and a coal shed.
