= Pearl Lake State Park =

State park in Routt County, Colorado

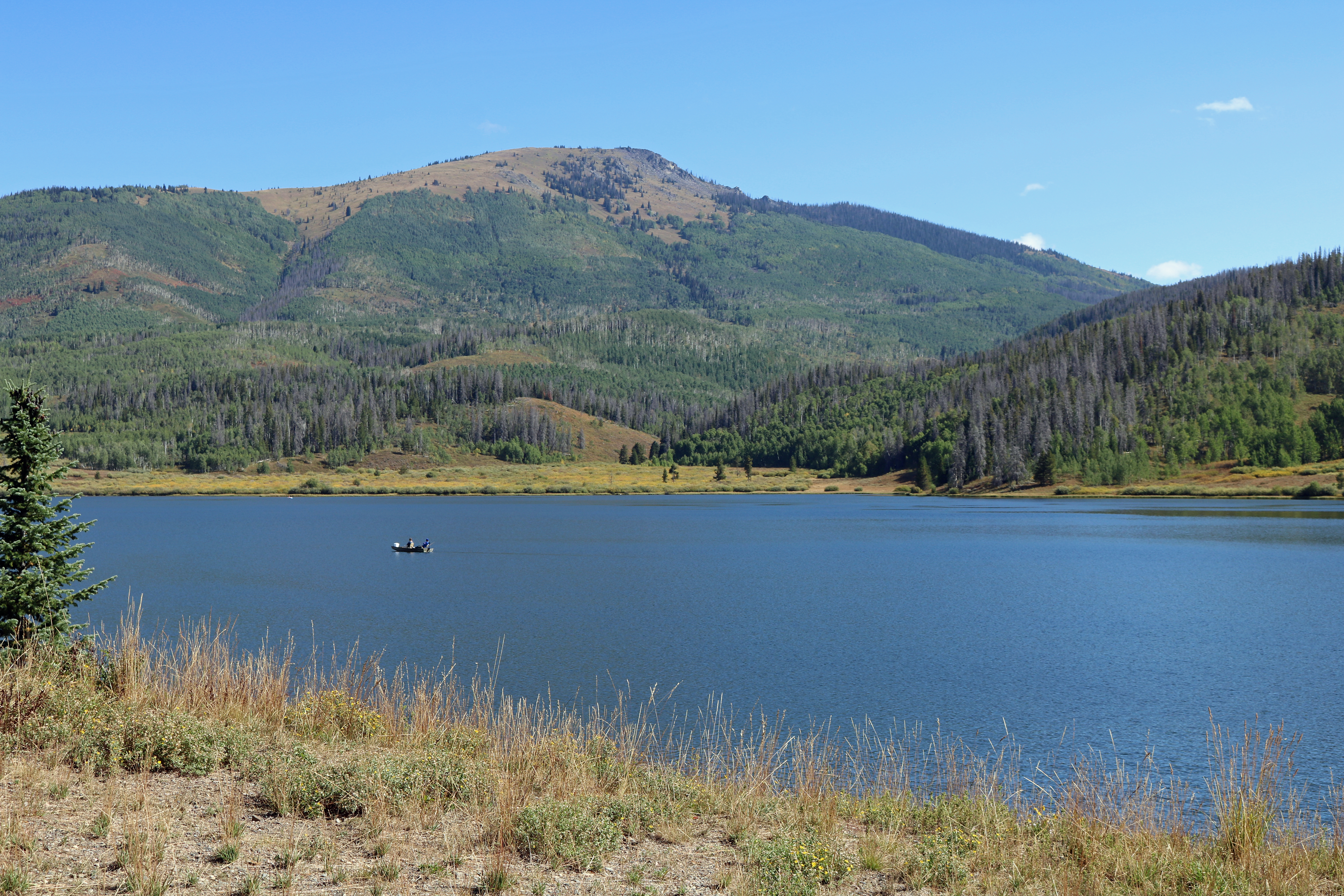
- The park and lake in 2016.

- Location within Colorado
- Location: Routt County, Colorado, USA
- Nearest city: Steamboat Springs, CO
- Coordinates: 40°47′12″N 106°53′28″W
- Area: 300 acres (120 ha)
- Established: 1964
- Visitors: 57,161 (in 2021)
- Governing body: Colorado Parks and Wildlife

Pearl Lake State Park, at the base of Farwell Mountain, is in Routt County, Colorado near the town of Hahns Peak Village, Colorado and is north of Steamboat Springs. Pearl Lake is named for M. Pearl Hartt, the wife of pioneer sheep rancher, John Kelly Hartt.

== History ==
John Kelly Hartt was a principal owner of three of the largest sheep companies in U.S. history—Pioneer, Cow Creek and Yellowstone. The sheep wintered near Rawlins, Wyoming. The Cow Creek and Pioneer sheep summered near Hahn's Peak, Colorado in the place that is now Pearl Lake. John Kelly Hartt died in the early 1950s, eventually resulting in the sale of the land by his wife, Pearl, to the U.S. Forest Service. That sale started the event that shifted this region from primarily agricultural to primarily recreational.

== Activities ==
Recreational opportunities in Pearl State Park include camping, boating, fishing and picnicking. There are 36 campsites amongst the forest of fir, spruce and pine. In addition to tent camping, trailers and small motor homes are permitted. The park also has two yurts available for rent. The 167-acre (0.68 km^{2}) lake permits boating, including gasoline and electric motors (though boaters are restricted to wakeless speeds). Fishing (license required) is restricted to flies and artificial lures (no bait permitted).

During the winter, due to snowfall (over 300 inches (7,600 mm) annually), the roads and facilities are closed. However, the park is open for foot and snowmobile access. Cross-country skiing, snowshoeing, and ice fishing are popular winter activities.
