= Dunckley, Colorado =

Ghost town in Routt County, Colorado, United States

Dunckley
- ghost town
- Location of Dunckley, Colorado. Dunckley (Colorado)
- Coordinates: 40°18′03″N 107°11′39″W
- Country: United States
- State: Colorado
- County: Routt

Government
  - Type: unincorporated community
  - Body: Routt County
- Elevation: 7,605 ft (2,318 m)
- Time zone: UTC−07:00 (MST)
  - Summer (DST): UTC−06:00 (MDT)
- ZIP code: Steamboat Springs 80487
- Area codes: 970/748
- GNIS place ID: 204651

Dunckley (also spelled Dunkley) is a ghost town in Routt County, Colorado, United States.

== History ==
The Dunkley [sic], Colorado, post office operated from December 16, 1892, until December 31, 1942. The Steamboat Springs, Colorado, post office (ZIP code 80487) now serves the area. The community was named in honor of several members of the local Dunkley family.

== Geography ==
Dunckley is located in Routt County at coordinates 40.3008°N 107.1942°W and elevation 7,605 feet (2,318 m).

== See also ==
- Steamboat Springs, CO Micropolitan Statistical Area
- List of populated places in Colorado
- List of post offices in Colorado
