= Steamboat Springs Downtown Historic District =

- U.S. National Register of Historic Places
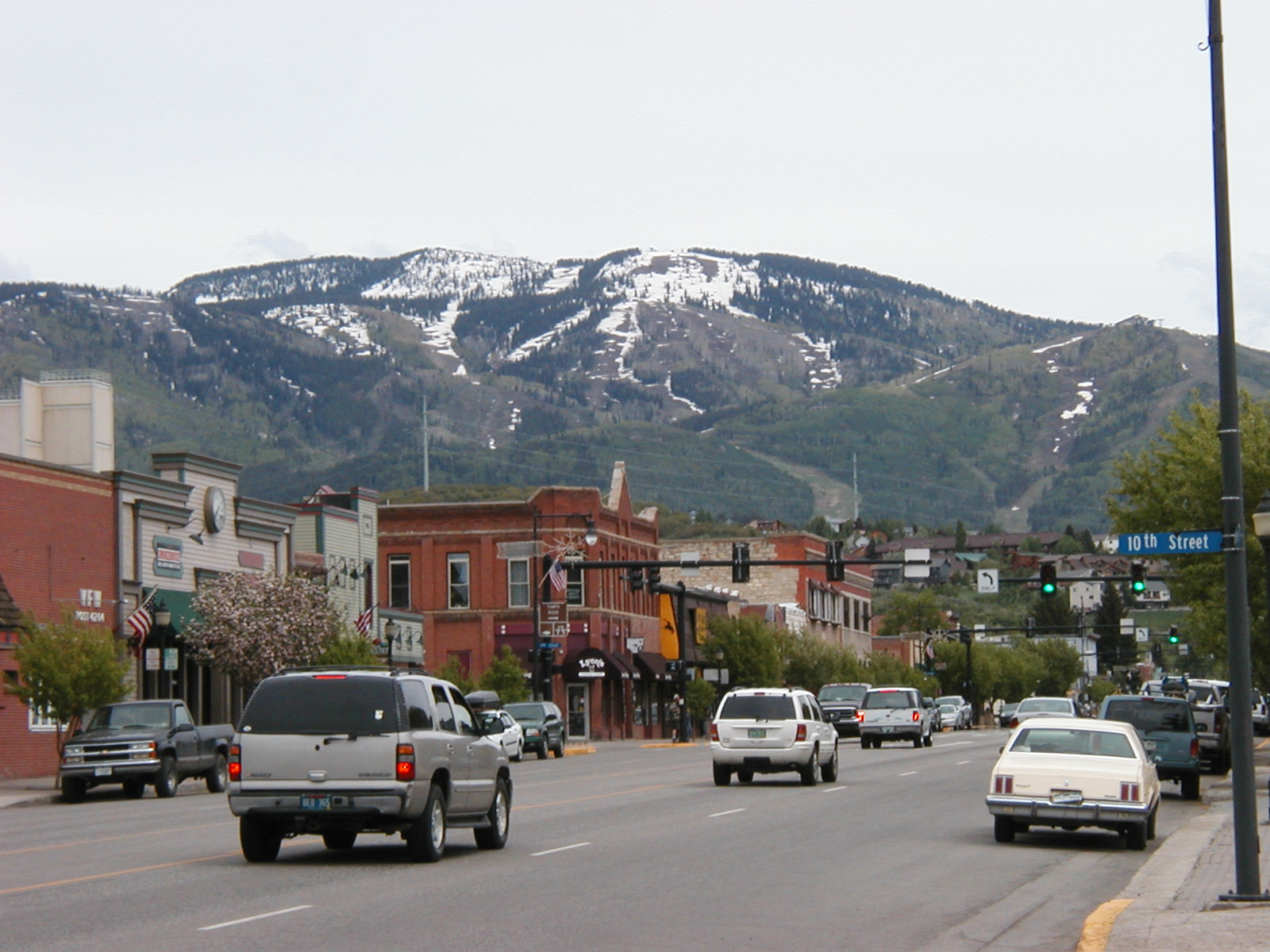

- Location within Colorado
- Location: Lincoln Ave. roughly bounded by 5th to 11th Sts., Steamboat Springs, Colorado
- Coordinates: 40.4857°N 106.8336°W
- Area: 19 acres (7.7 ha)
- Architect: Frank E. Edbrooke, others
- NRHP reference No.: 14000387
- Added to NRHP: July 11, 2014

The Steamboat Springs Downtown Historic District is a historic district covering about six blocks which was listed on the National Register of Historic Places in 2014.

The district consists of "mainly one to two story brick and wood commercial buildings with a sampling of buildings three stories or more. The commercial buildings are built lot line to lot line with no front or side setbacks along Lincoln Avenue except for the Routt County Courthouse which is set back from Lincoln Avenue with an expansive lawn and the two gas stations that have the pump stations sited at the front of the lot with stores to the rear. The rectangular flat roof buildings typically display storefronts, recessed entryways, second-story narrow windows and parapets (both decorative and non-decorative). The styles featured in the district consist generally of the late 19th and early 20th Century Commercial, Classical Revivals and Modern Movement."

It included 35 contributing buildings and a contributing object (Highway 40 (South Lincoln Avenue) through the area), as well as 16 noncontributing buildings. Three resources were already separately listed on the National Register. It is a 19 acres (7.7 ha) area centered on Lincoln Avenue (U.S. Highway 40).

According to History Colorado, "approximately forty percent of buildings within the district were constructed during the decade of the train's arrival in anticipation of growth (1900-1909) or in the decade immediately following (1910-1920)."

Selected buildings in the district are:

- First National Bank Building, 803 Lincoln Avenue, already NRHP-listed
- Routt County Bank Building (1923, Annex 1985), 802 Lincoln Avenue, Renaissance Revival style with Beaux-Arts influences, already NRHP-listed
- Maxwell Squire Building, 842 Lincoln Avenue, already NRHP-listed
- Mountain State Telephone and Telegraph Building, 704 Lincoln Avenue

== Gallery ==
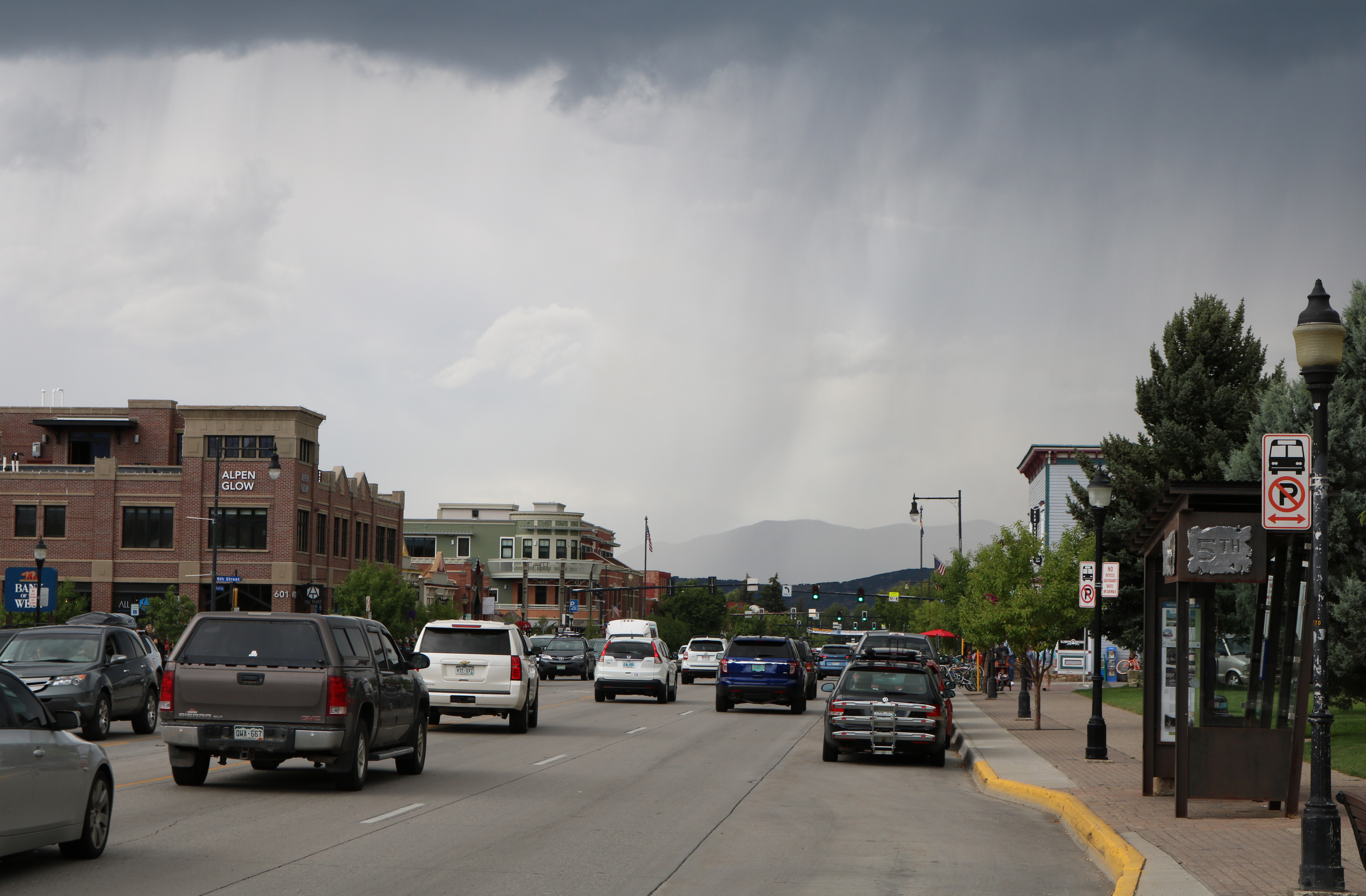
looking north from about 5th st.
