= Gore Pass =

Mountain pass in Colorado, USA

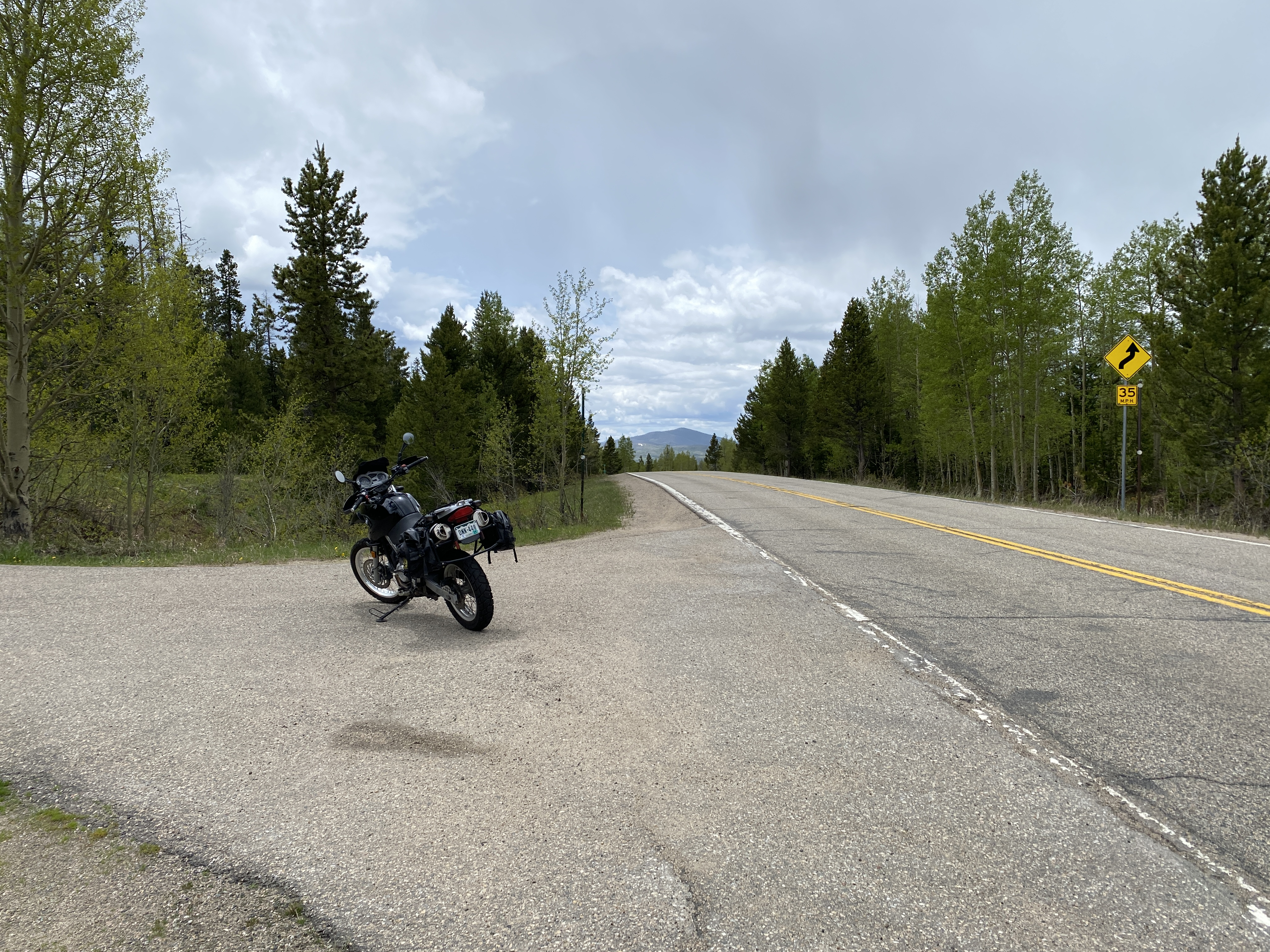
- The summit of Gore Pass, looking west.
- Interactive map of Gore Pass
- Elevation: 9,524 ft (2,903 m)
- Traversed by: State Highway 134

Third Approach
- Location: Grand County, Colorado, U.S.
- Range: Rocky Mountains
- Coordinates: 40°04′33″N 106°33′39″W
- Topo map: USGS Gore Pass

Gore Pass (elevation 9,524 feet (2,903 meters)) is a high mountain pass in the Rocky Mountains of northwestern Colorado in the United States.

The pass crosses a gap in the northern end of the Gore Range in southwestern Grand County, west of Kremmling. The pass is traversed by State Highway 134 east of Toponas, connecting Middle Park with the Yampa River valley. It has a mild approach to the west, while the east side has a moderate 5.4% grade.

Gore Pass is named for Sir St. George Gore, an Irish baronet from Sligo whose sole purpose was to break records and fill his trophy room. In 1975, there was a sign on Colorado State Road Hwy 84 which read: "GORE PASS, Altitude 9,000 feet. Here in 1855 crossed Sir St. George Gore, an Irish baronet bent on the slaughter of game and guided by Jim Bridger. For three years he scoured Colorado, Montana, and Wyoming, accompanied usually by fort men, many carts, wagons, hounds, and unexampled camp luxuries. More than 2,000 buffalo, 1,600 deer and elk, and 100 bears were massacred for sport." Readers are referred to pages 305-312 of the book, The Trail of Tears: The Story of the American Indian Removals 1813-1855 by Gloria Jahoda, 1975.

The Rock Creek Stage Station at Gore Pass is a historic log building which is listed on the National Register of Historic Places.

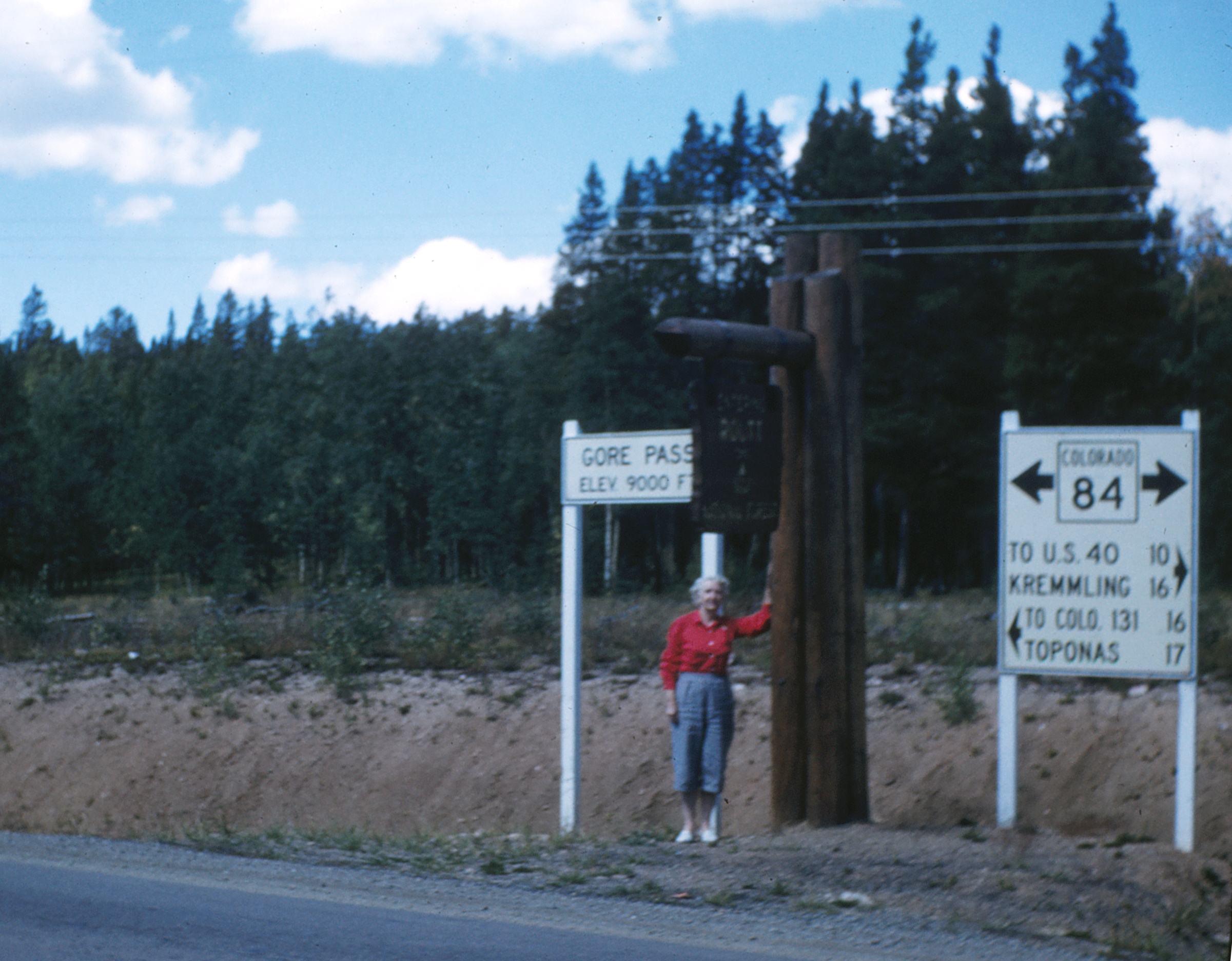
Gore Pass, circa 1962

== Climate ==
Buffalo Park is a SNOTEL weather station near Gore Pass.

Climate data for Buffalo Park, Colorado, 2006–2020 normals, extremes 1995–present: 9240ft (2816m)
| Month | Jan | Feb | Mar | Apr | May | Jun | Jul | Aug | Sep | Oct | Nov | Dec | Year |
|---|---|---|---|---|---|---|---|---|---|---|---|---|---|
| Record high °F (°C) | 52 (11) | 54 (12) | 62 (17) | 66 (19) | 79 (26) | 85 (29) | 88 (31) | 85 (29) | 80 (27) | 70 (21) | 60 (16) | 47 (8) | 88 (31) |
| Mean maximum °F (°C) | 43.7 (6.5) | 46.6 (8.1) | 54.7 (12.6) | 61.4 (16.3) | 69.7 (20.9) | 79.9 (26.6) | 80.5 (26.9) | 77.9 (25.5) | 74.7 (23.7) | 65.1 (18.4) | 55.3 (12.9) | 44.2 (6.8) | 81.7 (27.6) |
| Mean daily maximum °F (°C) | 30.4 (−0.9) | 32.2 (0.1) | 41.1 (5.1) | 46.4 (8.0) | 55.2 (12.9) | 69.0 (20.6) | 72.7 (22.6) | 70.1 (21.2) | 63.8 (17.7) | 49.9 (9.9) | 39.9 (4.4) | 29.4 (−1.4) | 50.0 (10.0) |
| Daily mean °F (°C) | 15.4 (−9.2) | 18.2 (−7.7) | 26.6 (−3.0) | 33.7 (0.9) | 41.8 (5.4) | 52.0 (11.1) | 56.3 (13.5) | 54.1 (12.3) | 48.1 (8.9) | 37.2 (2.9) | 26.6 (−3.0) | 16.0 (−8.9) | 35.5 (1.9) |
| Mean daily minimum °F (°C) | 0.7 (−17.4) | 3.9 (−15.6) | 11.8 (−11.2) | 20.7 (−6.3) | 28.4 (−2.0) | 35.1 (1.7) | 39.8 (4.3) | 38.0 (3.3) | 32.4 (0.2) | 24.1 (−4.4) | 13.2 (−10.4) | 3.0 (−16.1) | 20.9 (−6.2) |
| Mean minimum °F (°C) | −22.6 (−30.3) | −12.4 (−24.7) | −12.3 (−24.6) | 2.7 (−16.3) | 13.9 (−10.1) | 27.8 (−2.3) | 31.7 (−0.2) | 30.7 (−0.7) | 22.4 (−5.3) | 4.9 (−15.1) | −9.2 (−22.9) | −23.4 (−30.8) | −28.0 (−33.3) |
| Record low °F (°C) | −34 (−37) | −44 (−42) | −30 (−34) | −19 (−28) | 0 (−18) | 19 (−7) | 24 (−4) | 17 (−8) | 10 (−12) | −17 (−27) | −26 (−32) | −36 (−38) | −44 (−42) |
| Average precipitation inches (mm) | 3.02 (77) | 2.89 (73) | 2.43 (62) | 3.07 (78) | 2.30 (58) | 0.99 (25) | 1.26 (32) | 1.30 (33) | 1.62 (41) | 2.02 (51) | 2.69 (68) | 2.91 (74) | 26.50 (673) |
| Average extreme snow depth inches (cm) | 45.8 (116) | 52.6 (134) | 56.1 (142) | 53.2 (135) | 39.0 (99) | 5.3 (13) | 0.2 (0.51) | 0.2 (0.51) | 0.7 (1.8) | 7.6 (19) | 18.1 (46) | 31.9 (81) | 59.5 (151) |
| Average precipitation days (≥ 0.01 in) | 14.2 | 13.2 | 12.2 | 13.0 | 10.0 | 4.3 | 6.4 | 6.9 | 7.6 | 9.8 | 11.8 | 13.4 | 122.8 |
Source 1: NOAA (precip/precip days 1991–2020)
Source 2: XMACIS2
