= Bell Mercantile =

- U.S. National Register of Historic Places
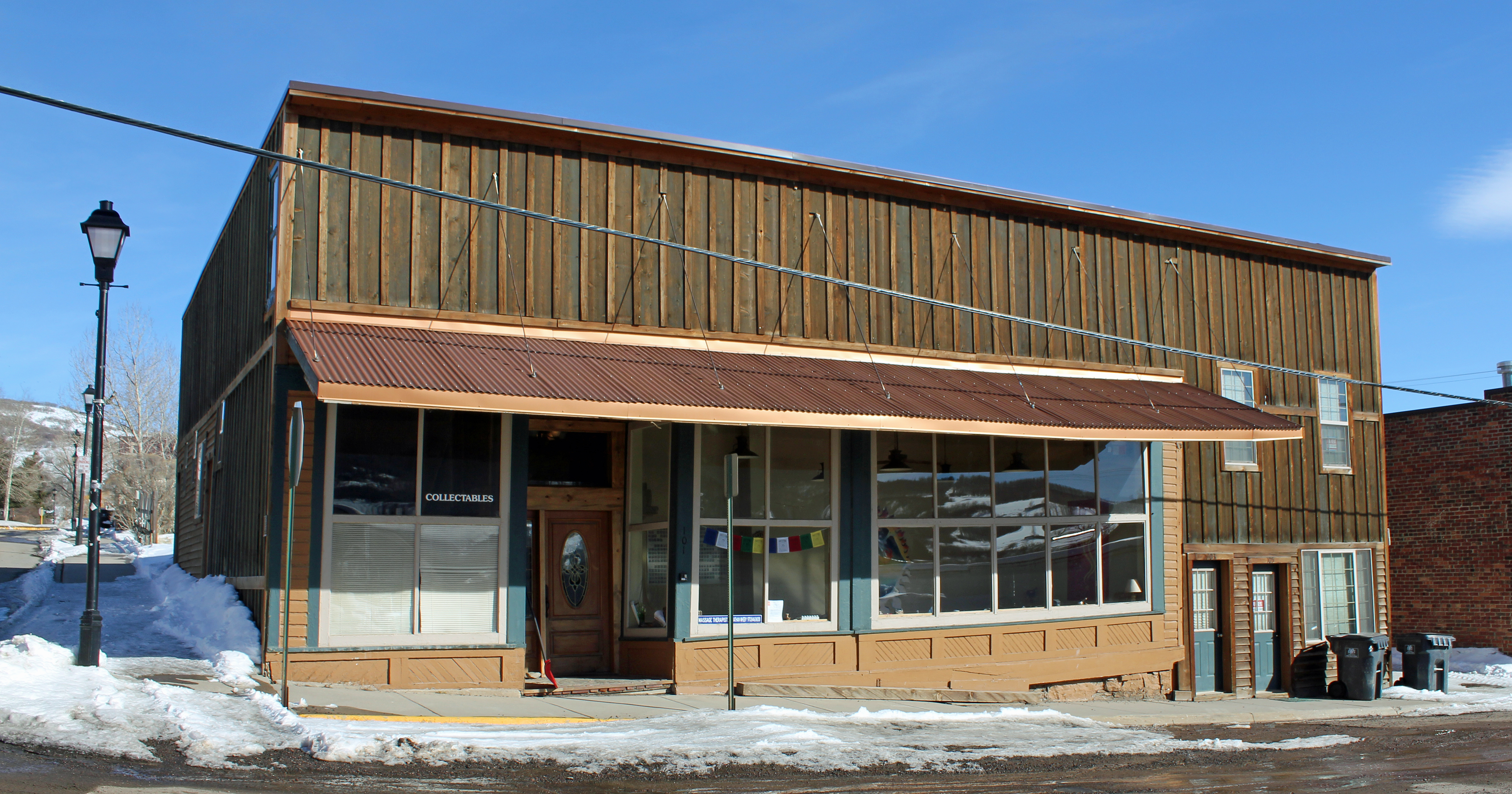
- Store in 2011

- Location within Colorado
- Location: 101-111 Moffat Ave., Oak Creek, Colorado
- Coordinates: 40°16′32″N 106°57′22″W
- Area: 0.1 acres (0.040 ha)
- Built: 1910
- Built by: Bell, Samuel; Bell, Edward
- Architectural style: Late 19th and Early 20th Century American Movements
- NRHP reference No.: 90000871
- Added to NRHP: June 7, 1990

The Bell Mercantile, a two-story store building at 101-111 Moffat Avenue in Oak Creek, Colorado, was built in 1910 by Samuel and Edward Bell on their ranch property. It served as a company store to a "vast number of coal miners" in the area, as coal mines paid employees through the store. The store subtracted charges for store purchases before paying balances of paychecks to the workers. It included a bank and later served as a doctor's office. It was listed on the National Register of Historic Places in 1990.

It is a wood-frame building with a flat roof, and it is clad in original shiplap siding. It was deemed significant as a mostly "unaltered example of the vernacular commercial buildings which were once prevalent in Colorado's mountain communities", which were built in the early 1900s. It was also deemed significant for its association with the "history of commerce in Oak Creek". It was one of just three businesses in Bell Town, which was incorporated in 1907 as Oak Creek.
