= Hahns Peak Schoolhouse =

- U.S. National Register of Historic Places
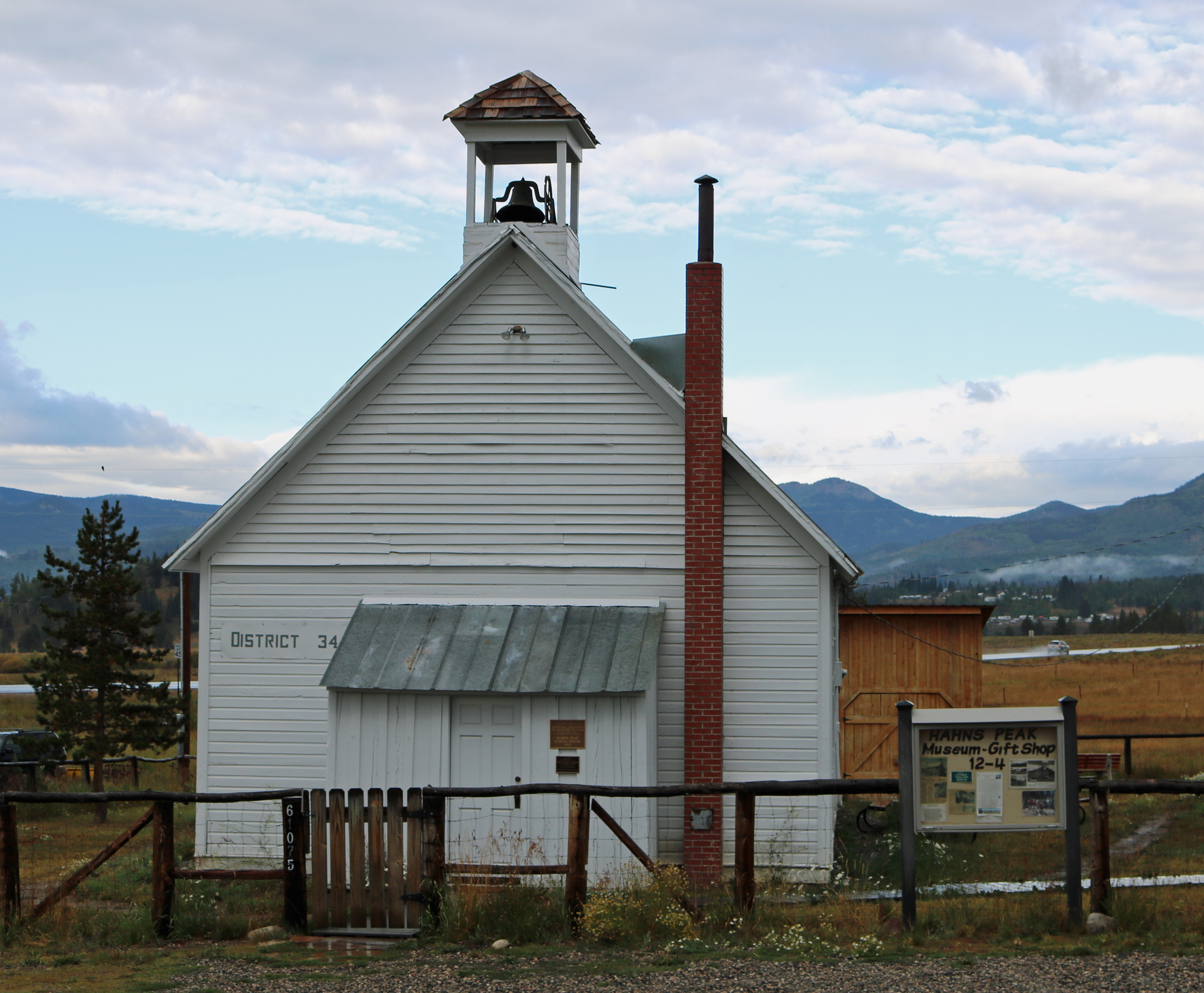
- Schoolhouse in 2016

- Location within Colorado
- Location: Main Street, Hahns Peak Village, Colorado
- Coordinates: 40.80627°N 106.94440°W
- Area: 1 acre (0.40 ha)
- Built: 1911
- MPS: Rural School Buildings in Colorado MPS
- NRHP reference No.: 74000594
- Added to NRHP: February 15, 1974

The Hahns Peak Schoolhouse is a one-room schoolhouse in the unincorporated community of Hahns Peak Village, Colorado, United States, that is listed on the National Register of Historic Places (NRHP).

== Description ==
The school was built in 1911 and is located on Main Street. It was listed on the NRHP February 15, 1974. It has also been known as "the little green school house". A front vestibule was added some time after 1917.

The village functioned as the county seat for northwestern Colorado from 1877 to 1912. The schoolhouse operated from 1912 to 1943.

== See also ==
- National Register of Historic Places listings in Routt County, Colorado
