= Mystic, Colorado =

Extinct town in Routt County, Colorado

Mystic
- Extinct town
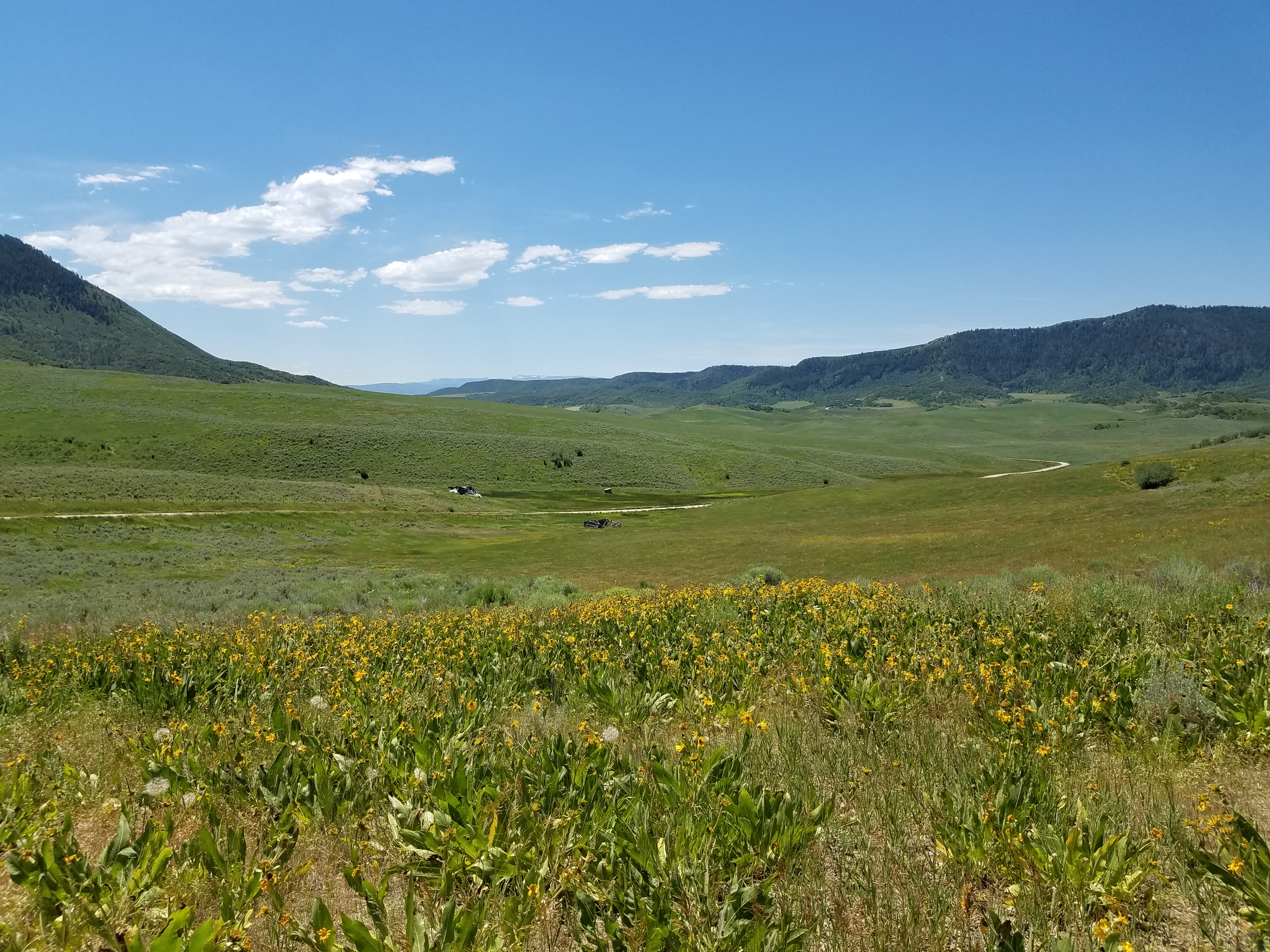
- Ridge overlooking Mystic Ranch at the location of the extinct town of Mystic, Colorado, from County Road 46
- Interactive map of Mystic
- Coordinates: 40°34′12″N 106°59′45″W
- Country: United States
- State: Colorado
- County: Routt County
- Post office opened: 1910
- Post office closed: 1942

Mystic is an extinct town in Routt County, Colorado, United States. The Geographic Names Information System classifies it as a populated place.

== Description ==
A post office called Mystic was established in 1910, and remained in operation until 1942. The community took its name from Mystic, Iowa, the former home of a pioneer settler.

== See also ==
- List of ghost towns in Colorado
