= Antlers Cafe and Bar =

- U.S. National Register of Historic Places
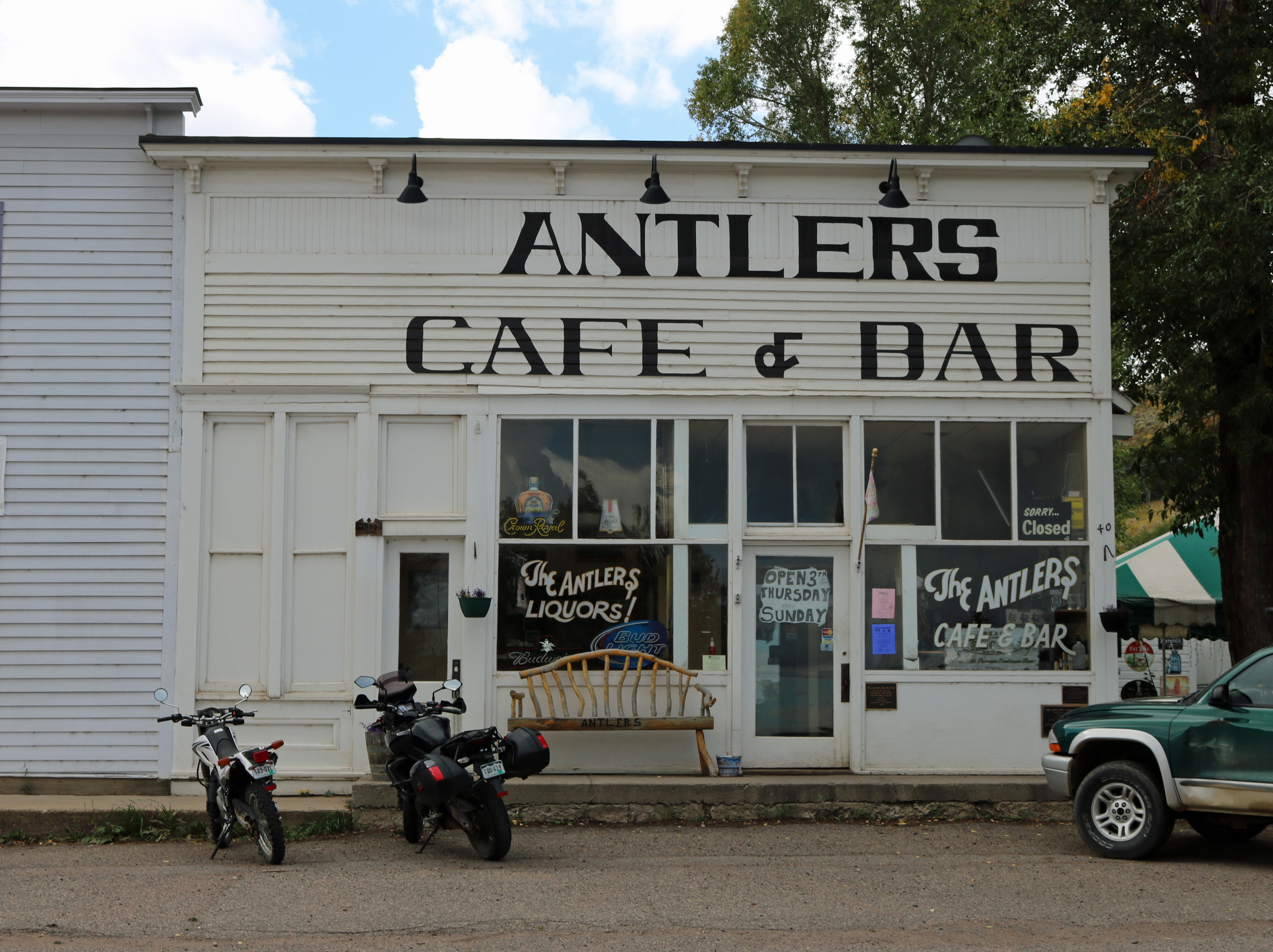

- Location within Colorado
- Location: 40 and 46 Moffat Ave., Yampa, Colorado
- Coordinates: 40°09′01″N 106°54′31″W
- Area: less than one acre
- Built: 1904
- NRHP reference No.: 14000251
- Added to NRHP: May 27, 2014

The Antlers Cafe and Bar in Yampa, Colorado, was built around 1903–04. It was listed on the National Register of Historic Places in 2014.

== History ==
It was a saloon before and after Prohibition, and was a pool hall reputedly with illegal alcohol during.
