= Mesa Schoolhouse =

- U.S. National Register of Historic Places
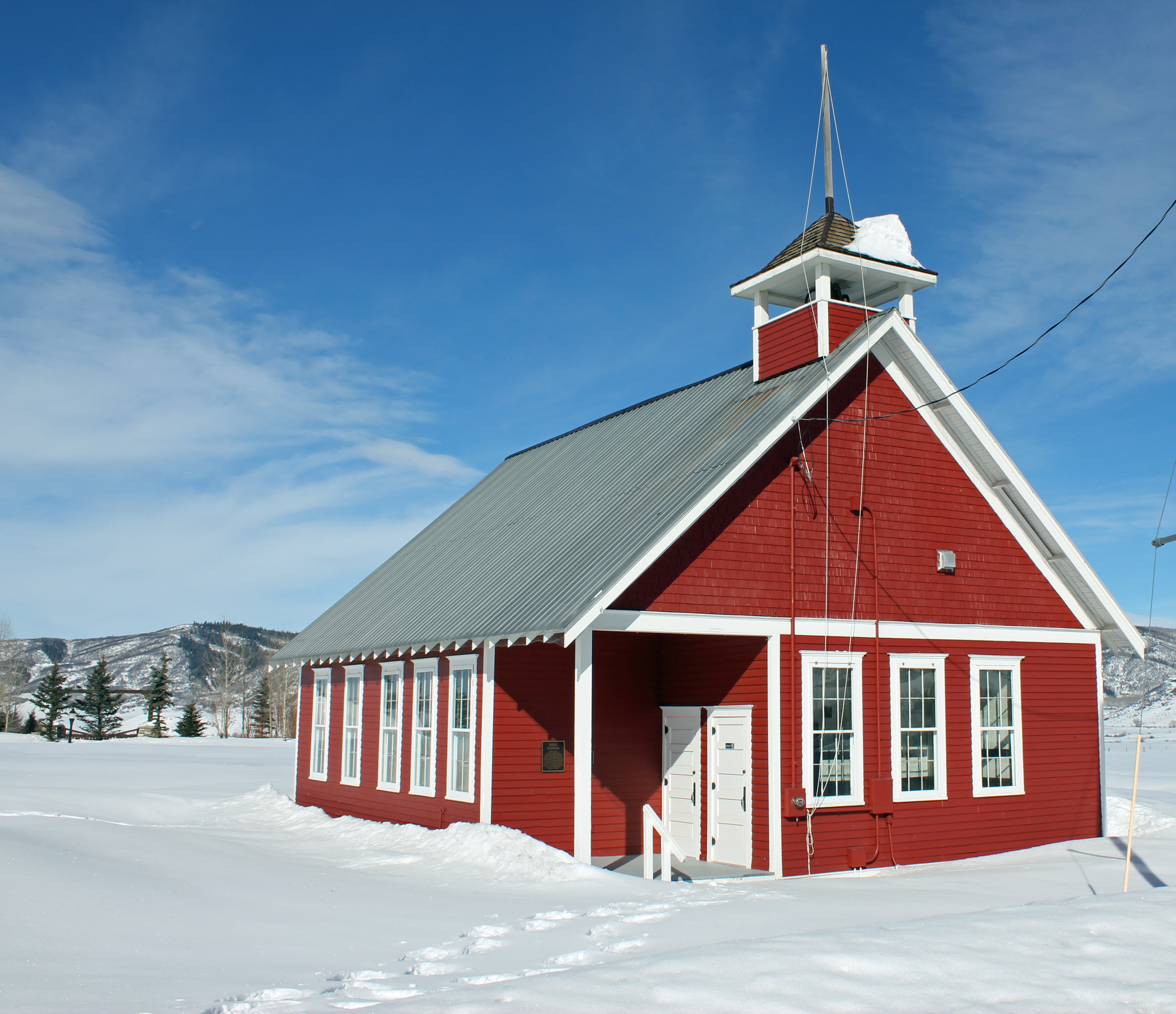

- Location within Colorado
- Location: 33985 S. U.S. Highway 40, near Steamboat Springs, Colorado
- Coordinates: 40°24′45″N 106°48′22″W
- Area: less than one acre
- Built: 1916
- Built by: Gumprecht, Art
- Architectural style: Late 19th And Early 20th Century American Movements
- MPS: Rural School Buildings in Colorado MPS
- NRHP reference No.: 07001113
- Added to NRHP: November 1, 2007

The Mesa Schoolhouse, near Steamboat Springs, Colorado, was built in 1916. It was listed on the National Register of Historic Places in 2007.

It was used as a schoolhouse during 1916 to 1959, and had a large classroom and a small art room and library. It was used as a residence during the 1960s, 70s, and 80s. It was acquired by the City of Steamboat Springs in 1998.

It is a one-story 32 by 42 feet (9.8 m × 12.8 m) structure.
