= Steamboat Lake (Cass and Hubbard counties, Minnesota) =

Lake in the state of Minnesota, United States

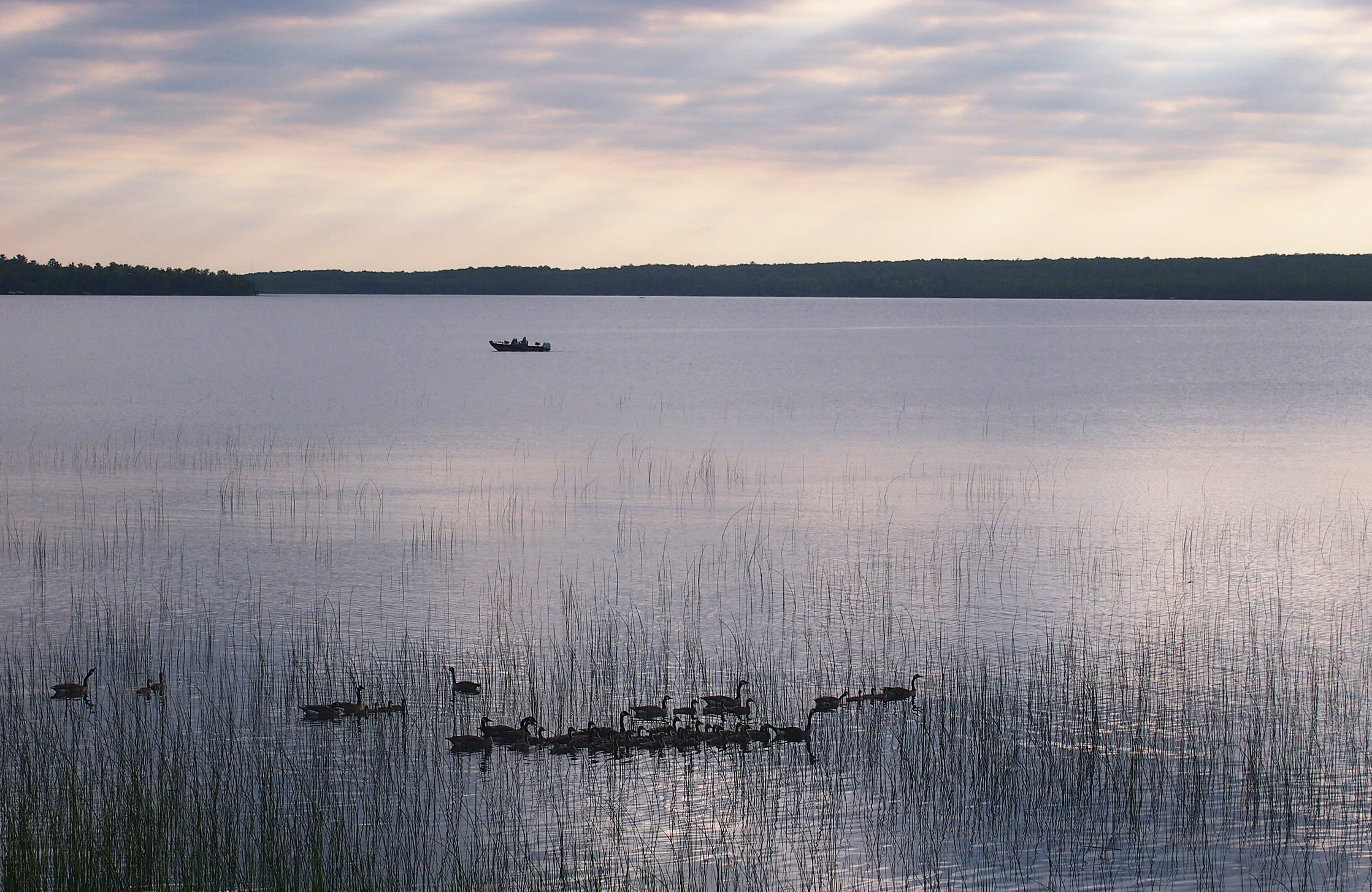
- Steamboat Lake from the adjacent Heartland State Trail

- Location within Minnesota
- Location: Cass and Hubbard counties, Minnesota
- Coordinates: 47°16′N 94°40′W
- Type: lake

Steamboat Lake is a lake in Cass and Hubbard counties, in the U.S. state of Minnesota. Steamboat Lake and adjacent Steamboat River were so named from the frequent steamboat traffic once traveling their waters.

== See also ==
- List of lakes in Minnesota
