= Colorado State Highway 134 =

State highway in Colorado, United States

State Highway 134
- SH 134 highlighted in red

Route information
- Maintained by CDOT
- Length: 27.163 mi (43.715 km)

Major junctions
- West end: SH 131 in Toponas
- East end: US 40 north of Kremmling

Location
- Country: United States
- State: Colorado
- Counties: Routt, Grand

Highway system
- Colorado State Highway System; Interstate; US; State; Scenic
← SH 133	→ SH 135

State Highway 134 (SH 134) is a 27.163 mi (43.715 km) long state highway in northern Colorado. SH 134's western terminus is at SH 131 in Toponas, and the eastern terminus is at U.S. Route 40 (US 40) north of Kremmling.

== Route description ==
SH 134 begins in the west at Toponas and proceeds eastward entering Routt National Forest after three miles (5 km). From there the road climbs gradually for roughly thirteen miles to an elevation of 9,527 ft (2,904 m) at Gore Pass. At Gore Pass the route moves into Arapaho National Forest through which it passes for roughly three miles before leaving National Forest Service land. SH 134 continues for approximately eight more miles to its eastern terminus at US 40 six miles (10 km) north of Kremmling.

== History ==
The routing was originally part of the route SH 84. Then, after the U.S. Routes were established, to avoid confusion with US 84, the route was renumbered to SH 134 in 1968. There have been no major routing changes since SH 84 was established.

== Climate ==
Porcupine Creek is a Remote Automated Weather Station located beside Colorado State Highway 134, near Lynx Pass Campground.

Climate data for Porcupine Creek (RAWS), Colorado, 1991–2020 normals: 8900ft (2713m)
Month	Jan	Feb	Mar	Apr	May	Jun	Jul	Aug	Sep	Oct	Nov	Dec	Year
Mean daily maximum °F (°C)	31.3 (−0.4)	33.5 (0.8)	40.8 (4.9)	46.7 (8.2)	56.8 (13.8)	67.8 (19.9)	74.2 (23.4)	72.5 (22.5)	64.9 (18.3)	52.1 (11.2)	39.7 (4.3)	31.0 (−0.6)	50.9 (10.5)
Daily mean °F (°C)	17.0 (−8.3)	19.1 (−7.2)	26.3 (−3.2)	33.2 (0.7)	42.1 (5.6)	50.5 (10.3)	56.6 (13.7)	55.3 (12.9)	47.7 (8.7)	36.9 (2.7)	25.4 (−3.7)	16.9 (−8.4)	35.6 (2.0)
Mean daily minimum °F (°C)	2.7 (−16.3)	4.7 (−15.2)	11.7 (−11.3)	19.8 (−6.8)	27.3 (−2.6)	33.3 (0.7)	39.0 (3.9)	38.1 (3.4)	30.5 (−0.8)	21.7 (−5.7)	11.0 (−11.7)	2.7 (−16.3)	20.2 (−6.6)
Source: XMACIS2

== Major intersections ==
County	Location	mi	km	Destinations	Notes
Routt	Toponas	0.000	0.000	SH 131 – Wolcott, Steamboat Springs	Western terminus
Grand		27.163	43.715	US 40 – Steamboat Springs, Kremmling	Eastern terminus
1.000 mi = 1.609 km; 1.000 km = 0.621 mi

== See also ==
- List of state highways in Colorado
