= Hahns Peak Village, Colorado =

Unincorporated community in Routt County, CO, USA

Hahns Peak Village
- Unincorporated community
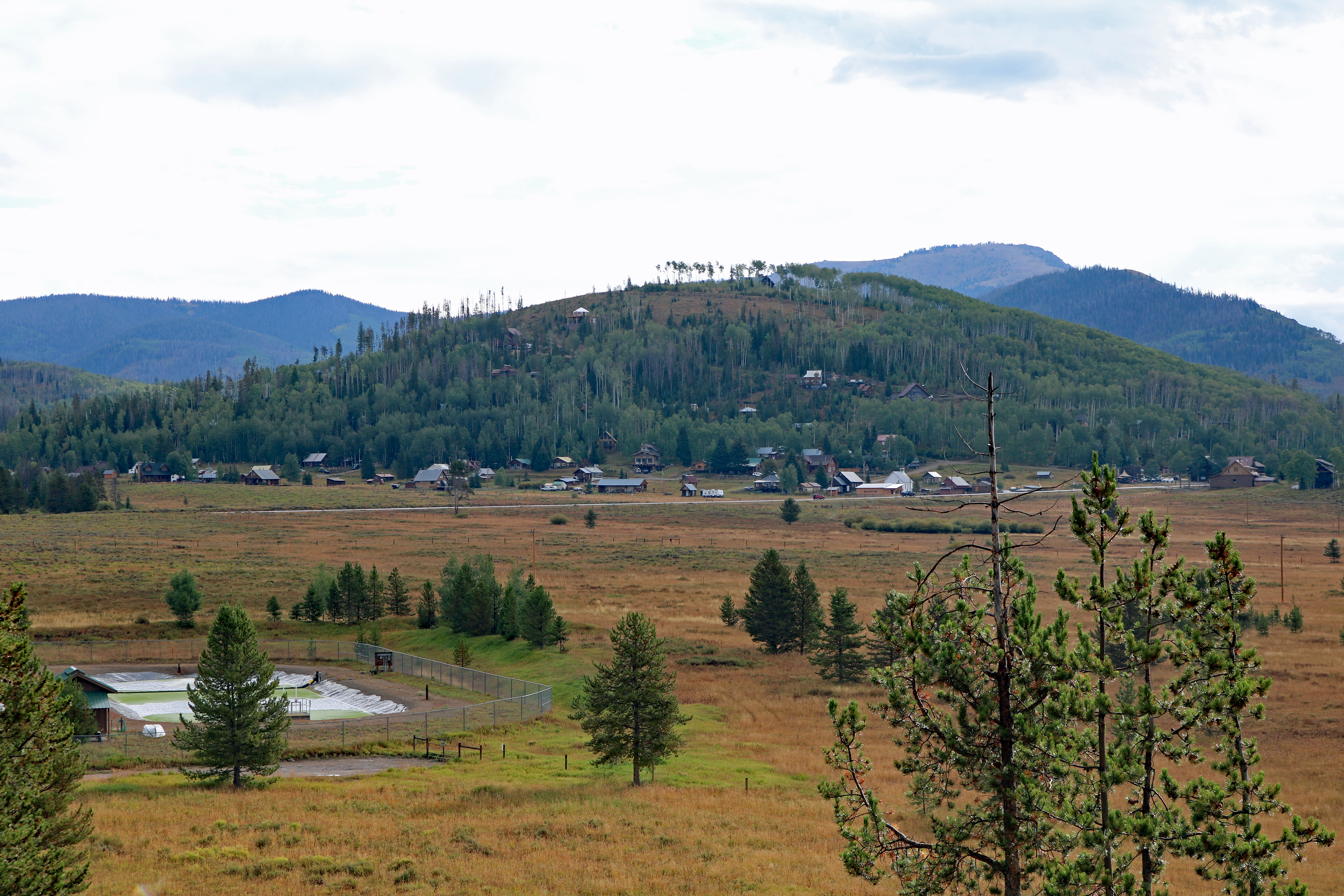
- A view of Hahns Peak Village from nearby Steamboat Lake State Park.

- Location within the state of Colorado Location within the United States
- Coordinates: 40.8056°N 106.9442°W
- Country: United States
- State: State of Colorado
- County: Routt County
- Elevation: 8,132 ft (2,479 m)
- Time zone: UTC-7 (MST)
  - Summer (DST): UTC-6 (MDT)

Hahns Peak Village is an unincorporated community in Routt County, Colorado, United States. The village is located 7 miles (11 km) north of Clark on Routt County Road 129, and 0.5 miles (0.8 km) east-southeast of Steamboat Lake State Park. The community is named for Hahns Peak, which 2.7 miles (4.3 km) north-northeast.

== History ==
The settlement was established as a placer gold mining camp around 1865. Three men, Joseph Hahn, William Doyle, and George Way, lead a group of fifty miners to the area. Hahn, an immigrant from Germany, was elected as the leader of the mining district. After the summer most of the miners left the area for the winter leaving behind Hahn, Doyle, and Way. Way was supposed to head out for supplies in October and return to the camp, but he never returned for unknown reasons. The greatly weakened Doyle and Hahn left in the spring, but Hahn died during the journey.

The early mining history makes Hahns Peak Village the oldest permanent settlement in the northern part of Routt County. At the mine's peak around the turn of the 20th century, Hahns Peak Village was home to several thousand people. By 1905, larger mining companies had brought miners to the village. However, while gold was prominent in the mine, it proved too difficult to extract efficiently. Combined with the fact that the nearest smelting facility was over 30 miles away, the mine struggled to stay afloat, and the villages near collapse followed.

In 1912, Hahns Peak Village lost its county seat status to Steamboat Springs, which it had held since 1877. Attempts by ranchers to settle in the area were impeded by harsh winters, preventing any significant revival of the village. The establishment of the nearby Steamboat Lake State Park in 1967, along with its annual influx of nearly 400 thousand visitors, has played a crucial role in sustaining the community.

The Hahns Peak post office operated from 1877 until 1941. It is now served by the post office in nearby Clark.

An 1800s cabin, the Wither Cabin, is restored and now sits on Main Street. The Hahns Peak Schoolhouse, which operated from 1912 to 1943, is also on Main Street. The school is listed on the National Register of Historic Places.

== See also ==
- Geography of Colorado
- List of places in Colorado
