= Toponas, Colorado =

Unincorporated community in Routt County, CO, USA

- Unincorporated community
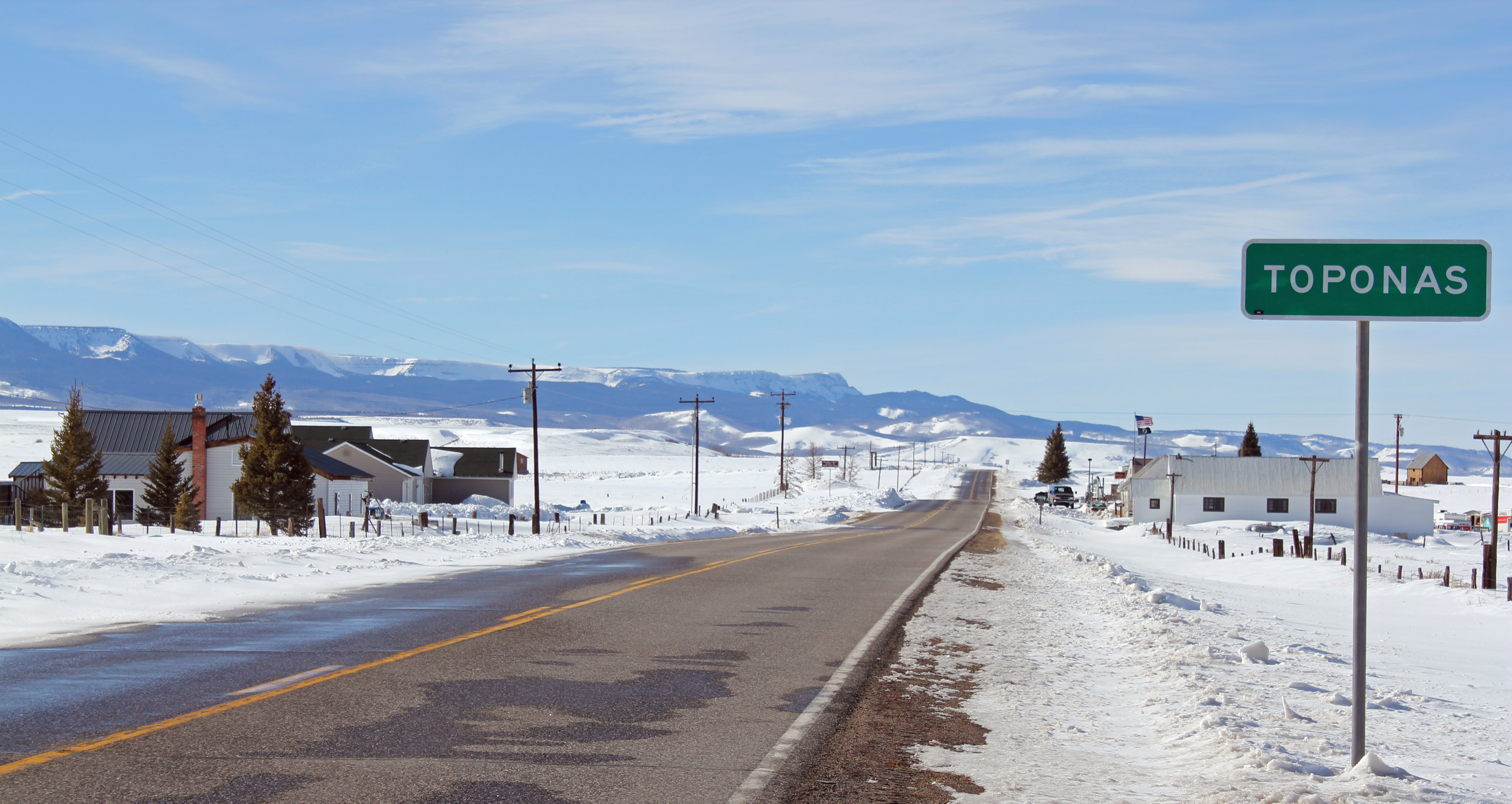
- Entering Toponas on State Highway 131.

- Location in Routt County and the state of Colorado Toponas, Colorado (the United States)
- Coordinates: 40°03′37″N 106°48′29″W
- Country: United States
- State: Colorado
- County: Routt County
- Elevation: 8,285 ft (2,525 m)
- Time zone: UTC-7 (MST)
  - Summer (DST): UTC-6 (MDT)
- ZIP code: 80479
- GNIS feature ID: 173099

Toponas is an unincorporated community in Routt County, Colorado, United States.

== Description ==
The community took its name from nearby Toponas Rock. The population in 2010 was 48; in 2017 it is estimated at 26, all in ages ranging from 55 years upwards.

As of 2015, the village consists of a large general store with gas pumps, and a few ranch houses and attendant outbuildings. Just west of the village is a post office, currently serving ZIP Code 80479, which has been in operation since 1888. The community took its name from nearby Toponas Rock.

== Geography ==
Despite the small size of the town, this is a strategic location, lying in a broad mountain pass on the divide between the Yampa River to the north and the Colorado River to the south. As a result, the town is traversed by not only State Highway 131, but also the former Craig branch of the Denver and Rio Grande Western Railroad. Toponas also lies at the west end of State Highway 134 and thus at the bottom of the climb to Gore Pass, on one of the two highway routes between the Yampa Valley and Middle Park.
