= Routt County, Colorado =

County in Colorado, United States

- County
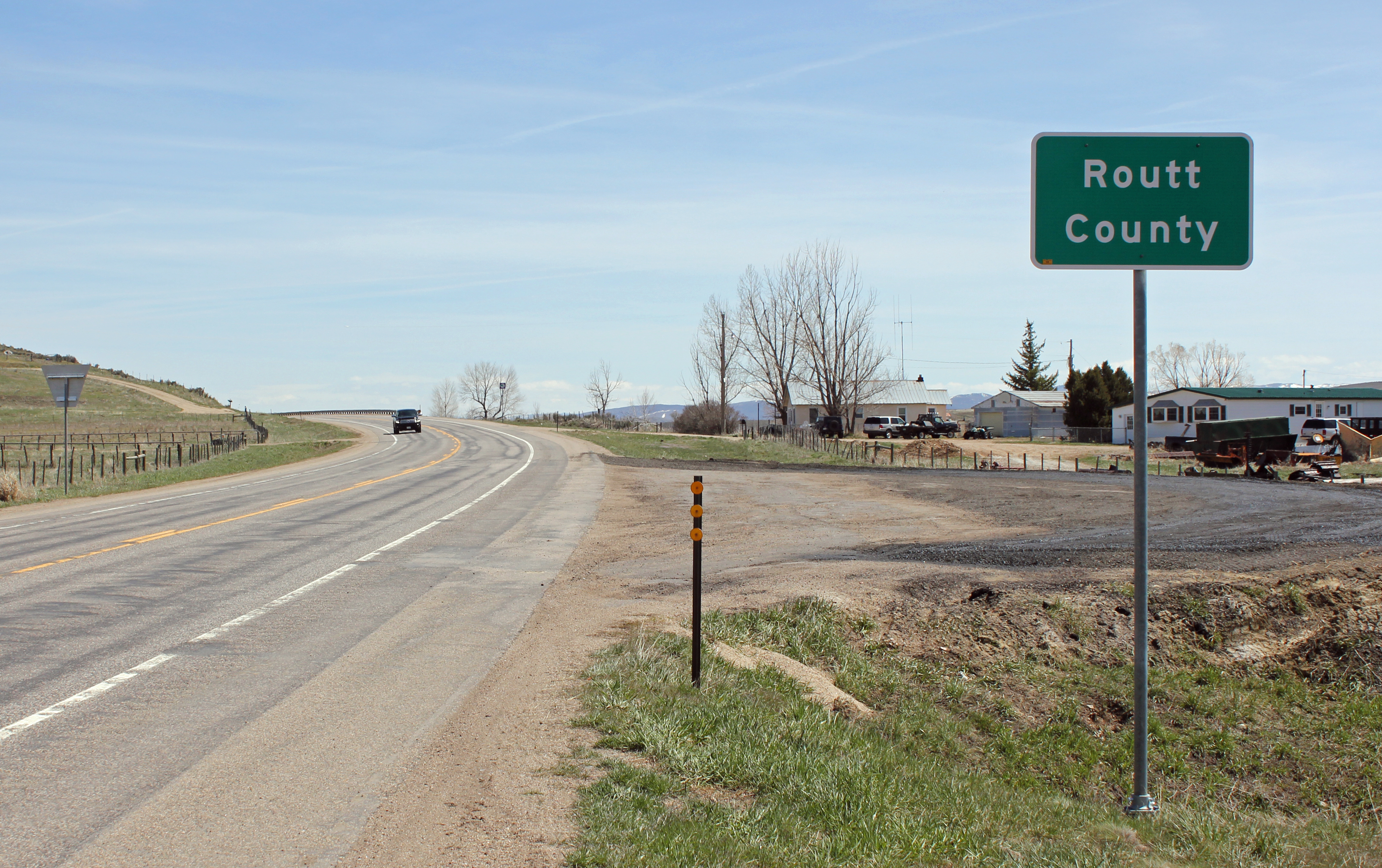
- Entering Routt County from the west on U.S. Route 40

- Location within the U.S. state of Colorado
- Coordinates: 40.48°N 106.99°W
- Country: United States
- State: Colorado
- Founded: January 29, 1877
- Named for: John Long Routt
- Seat: Steamboat Springs
- Largest city: Steamboat Springs

Area
  - Total: 2,368 sq mi (6,130 km^{2})
  - Land: 2,362 sq mi (6,120 km^{2})
  - Water: 6.1 sq mi (16 km^{2}) 0.3%

Population (2020)
  - Total: 24,829
  - Estimate (2025): 25,329 ▲
  - Density: 10.51/sq mi (4.059/km^{2})
- Time zone: UTC−7 (Mountain)
  - Summer (DST): UTC−6 (MDT)
- Congressional district: 2nd
- Website: www.co.routt.co.us

Routt County is a county located in the U.S. state of Colorado. As of the 2020 census, the population was 24,829. The county seat is Steamboat Springs. Routt County is included in the Steamboat Springs, CO Micropolitan Statistical Area, which also includes neighboring Moffat County.

== History ==
Placer gold was found near Hahns Peak in 1864 as part of the Colorado Gold Rush.

Routt County was created out of the western portion of Grand County on January 29, 1877. It was named in honor of John Long Routt, the last territorial and first state governor of Colorado. The western portion of Routt County was split off to form Moffat County on February 27, 1911.

== Geography ==
According to the U.S. Census Bureau, the county has a total area of 2,368 square miles (6,130 km^{2}), of which 2,362 square miles (6,120 km^{2}) is land and 6.1 square miles (16 km^{2}) (0.3%) is water.

=== Adjacent counties ===
- Carbon County, Wyoming - north
- Jackson County - east
- Grand County - southeast
- Eagle County - south
- Garfield County - south-southwest
- Rio Blanco County - southwest
- Moffat County - west

=== Major highways ===
- U.S. Highway 40
- State Highway 131
- State Highway 134

=== National protected areas ===
- Mount Zirkel Wilderness
- Routt National Forest
- Sarvis Creek Wilderness
- White River National Forest

=== State protected areas ===
- Pearl Lake State Park
- Stagecoach State Park
- Steamboat Lake State Park
- Yampa River State Park

=== Trails and byways ===
- Continental Divide National Scenic Trail
- Fish Creek Falls National Recreation Trail
- Flat Tops Trail Scenic Byway
- Great Parks Bicycle Route
- Swamp Park National Recreation Trail

== Demographics ==
Historical population
Census	Pop.	Note	%±
1880	140		—
1890	2,369		1,592.1%
1900	3,661		54.5%
1910	7,561		106.5%
1920	8,948		18.3%
1930	9,352		4.5%
1940	10,525		12.5%
1950	8,940		−15.1%
1960	5,900		−34.0%
1970	6,592		11.7%
1980	13,404		103.3%
1990	14,088		5.1%
2000	19,690		39.8%
2010	23,509		19.4%
2020	24,829		5.6%
2025 (est.)	25,329	▲	2.0%
U.S. Decennial Census; 1790-1960 1900-1990; 1990-2000 2010-2020

=== 2020 census ===
As of the 2020 census, the county had a population of 24,829, with 10,388 households and 5,106 families living in the county; 58.2% of residents lived in urban areas and 41.8% lived in rural areas.

Of the residents, 19.2% were under the age of 18 and 16.6% were 65 years of age or older; the median age was 41.6 years. For every 100 females there were 106.3 males, and for every 100 females age 18 and over there were 107.4 males.

Routt County, Colorado – Racial and ethnic composition Note: the US Census treats Hispanic/Latino as an ethnic category. This table excludes Latinos from the racial categories and assigns them to a separate category. Hispanics/Latinos may be of any race.
Race / Ethnicity (NH = Non-Hispanic)	Pop 2000	Pop 2010	Pop 2020	% 2000	% 2010	% 2020
White alone (NH)	18,662	21,310	21,242	94.78%	90.65%	85.55%
Black or African American alone (NH)	23	91	153	0.12%	0.39%	0.62%
Native American or Alaska Native alone (NH)	69	68	67	0.35%	0.29%	0.27%
Asian alone (NH)	75	145	169	0.38%	0.62%	0.68%
Pacific Islander alone (NH)	18	16	35	0.09%	0.07%	0.14%
Other race alone (NH)	12	15	92	0.06%	0.06%	0.37%
Mixed race or Multiracial (NH)	197	264	871	1.00%	1.12%	3.51%
Hispanic or Latino (any race)	634	1,600	2,200	3.22%	6.81%	8.86%
Total	19,690	23,509	24,829	100.00%	100.00%	100.00%

The racial makeup of the county was 87.5% White, 0.6% Black or African American, 0.5% American Indian and Alaska Native, 0.7% Asian, 0.2% Native Hawaiian and Pacific Islander, 3.2% from some other race, and 7.4% from two or more races. Hispanic or Latino residents of any race comprised 8.9% of the population.

There were 10,388 households in the county, of which 27.7% had children under the age of 18 living with them and 19.4% had a female householder with no spouse or partner present. About 26.0% of all households were made up of individuals and 8.7% had someone living alone who was 65 years of age or older.

There were 16,511 housing units, of which 37.1% were vacant. Among occupied housing units, 71.6% were owner-occupied and 28.4% were renter-occupied. The homeowner vacancy rate was 1.1% and the rental vacancy rate was 21.9%.

== Education ==
Four public school districts have territory in the county:

- Hayden School District RE-1, serving Hayden
- Steamboat Springs School District RE-2, serving Steamboat Springs
- South Routt School District RE-3, serving Oak Creek and Yampa
- Eagle County School District RE 50 (covers a small southeastern part of Routt County)

The county is also home to Steamboat Mountain School (private) in Steamboat Springs and North Routt Community Charter School in Clark.

Routt County is also home to the Steamboat Springs campus of Colorado Mountain College. CMC Steamboat is the only college in the United States that offers a degree in ski and snowboard business, which focuses on the retail, manufacturing, and marketing of snowsports.

== Politics ==
Routt County tilted Republican for much of the second half of the 20th century. From 1952 to 1988, Republicans carried the county in all but one election. The one break in this trend came in 1964, when Lyndon Johnson won Routt by a healthy margin of 63–37.

Since the late 1980s, Routt County has trended Democratic. It swung from a 34-point win for Ronald Reagan in 1984 to only a five-point win for George H. W. Bush in 1988. In 1992, Bill Clinton became the first Democrat to win the county since 1964 and only the second since 1948, carrying it with modest pluralities in both of his bids. George W. Bush won the county in 2000 by only 264 votes. However, John Kerry won it by a 10-point majority in 2004, and since then Routt has become powerfully Democratic, with Democrats winning by margins rivaling those in the counties closer to Denver. In 2016, Hillary Clinton won the county 54–37. Routt County continued its Democratic trend in 2020, with Joe Biden winning the county 63–35. This is the largest margin of victory for a Democratic presidential candidate in the county since the 1916 election.

United States presidential election results for Routt County, Colorado
Year	Republican		Democratic		Third party(ies)	
Year	No.	%	No.	%	No.	%
1880	39	67.24%	19	32.76%	0	0.00%
1884	106	59.22%	73	40.78%	0	0.00%
1888	366	62.24%	219	37.24%	3	0.51%
1892	325	49.17%	0	0.00%	336	50.83%
1896	122	9.89%	1,105	89.62%	6	0.49%
1900	575	40.41%	828	58.19%	20	1.41%
1904	1,384	60.54%	856	37.45%	46	2.01%
1908	1,098	42.71%	1,403	54.57%	70	2.72%
1912	738	26.11%	1,408	49.82%	680	24.06%
1916	849	28.76%	1,972	66.80%	131	4.44%
1920	1,854	57.51%	1,224	37.97%	146	4.53%
1924	1,822	53.51%	1,116	32.78%	467	13.72%
1928	2,304	57.36%	1,645	40.95%	68	1.69%
1932	1,568	35.56%	2,643	59.95%	198	4.49%
1936	1,541	33.68%	2,817	61.57%	217	4.74%
1940	2,212	44.07%	2,775	55.29%	32	0.64%
1944	1,869	48.79%	1,940	50.64%	22	0.57%
1948	1,492	40.87%	2,088	57.19%	71	1.94%
1952	2,143	57.31%	1,575	42.12%	21	0.56%
1956	1,811	57.55%	1,330	42.26%	6	0.19%
1960	1,651	53.83%	1,414	46.10%	2	0.07%
1964	1,095	36.94%	1,853	62.52%	16	0.54%
1968	1,602	53.83%	1,076	36.16%	298	10.01%
1972	2,629	59.33%	1,613	36.40%	189	4.27%
1976	2,822	54.13%	2,130	40.86%	261	5.01%
1980	3,574	53.33%	1,944	29.01%	1,184	17.67%
1984	4,239	66.15%	2,051	32.01%	118	1.84%
1988	3,264	51.65%	2,922	46.24%	133	2.10%
1992	2,358	28.89%	3,188	39.06%	2,615	32.04%
1996	3,019	38.52%	3,660	46.70%	1,158	14.78%
2000	4,472	46.40%	4,208	43.66%	958	9.94%
2004	5,199	44.20%	6,392	54.34%	171	1.45%
2008	4,725	35.80%	8,270	62.66%	204	1.55%
2012	5,469	41.07%	7,547	56.67%	301	2.26%
2016	5,230	37.39%	7,600	54.34%	1,156	8.27%
2020	5,925	35.11%	10,582	62.70%	369	2.19%
2024	5,676	34.75%	10,208	62.49%	451	2.76%

United States Senate election results for Routt County, Colorado2
Year	Republican		Democratic		Third party(ies)	
Year	No.	%	No.	%	No.	%
2020	6,256	37.18%	10,284	61.12%	286	1.70%

United States Senate election results for Routt County, Colorado3
Year	Republican		Democratic		Third party(ies)	
Year	No.	%	No.	%	No.	%
2022	4,836	34.87%	8,737	63.01%	294	2.12%

Colorado Gubernatorial election results for Routt County
Year	Republican		Democratic		Third party(ies)	
Year	No.	%	No.	%	No.	%
2022	4,415	31.82%	9,238	66.59%	220	1.59%

== Communities ==
=== City ===
- Steamboat Springs

=== Towns ===
- Hayden
- Oak Creek
- Yampa

=== Census-designated place ===
- Phippsburg

=== Unincorporated communities ===
- Clark
- Columbine
- Dunckley
- Hahns Peak Village
- Steamboat II
- Toponas
- Milner

=== Ghost towns ===
- Haybro
- Mad Creek
- Mystic
- Dunckley

== See also ==
- Bibliography of Colorado
- Geography of Colorado
- History of Colorado
  - National Register of Historic Places listings in Routt County, Colorado
- Index of Colorado-related articles
- List of Colorado-related lists
  - List of counties in Colorado
  - List of statistical areas in Colorado
- Outline of Colorado
