= Hahns Peak =

Mountain in Colorado, United States

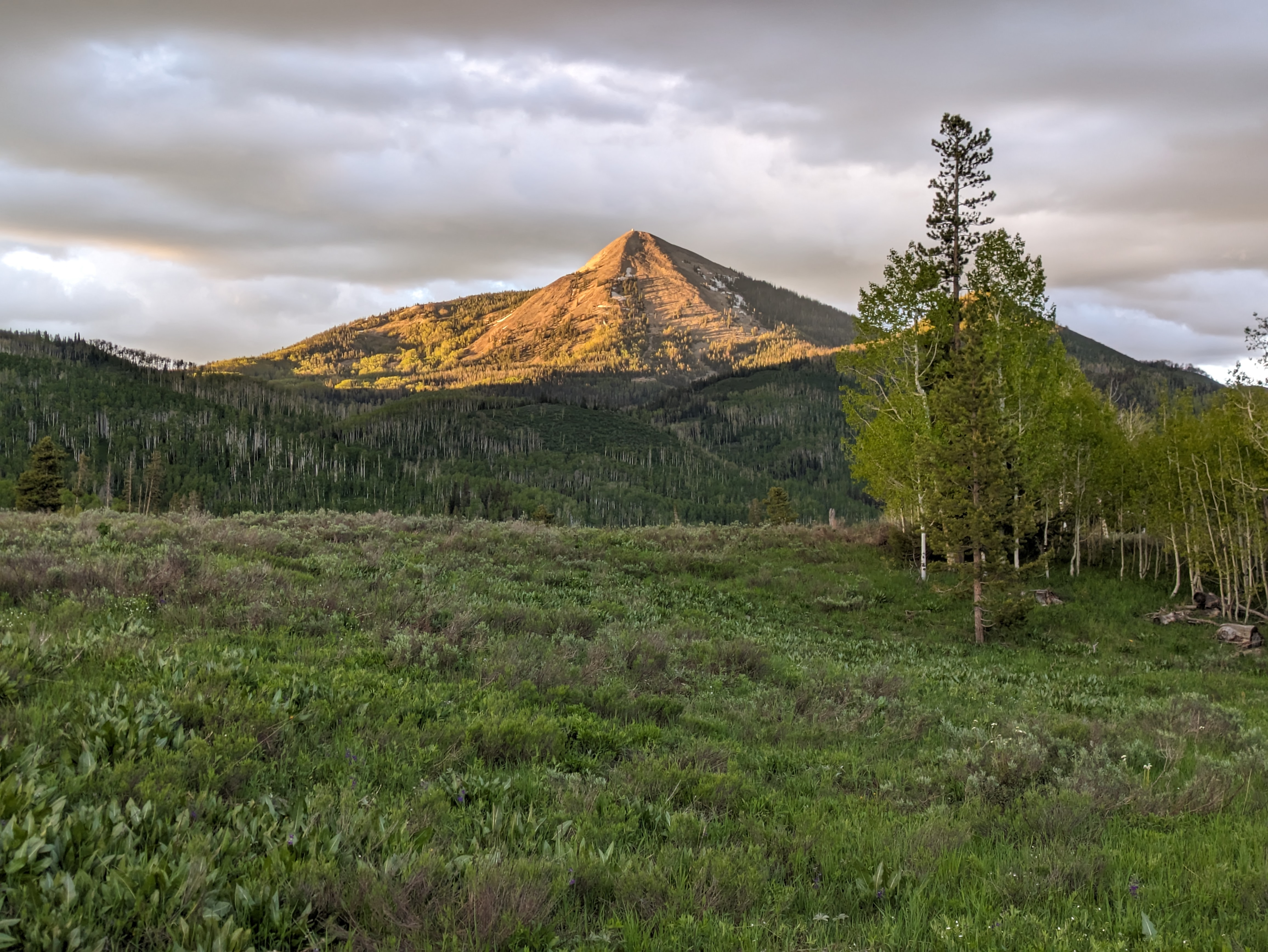
- The mountain in June 2023

Highest point
- Elevation: 10,839 ft (3,304 m)
- Prominence: 1,599 ft (487 m)
- Isolation: 4.42 mi (7.11 km)
- Coordinates: 40°50′35″N 106°55′47″W

Geography
- Location within Colorado
- Location: Colorado, USA
- Parent range: Elkhead Mountains

Hahns Peak is a summit in Routt County, Colorado, in the United States. With an elevation of 10,774 feet (3,284 m), Hahns Peak is the 1855th highest summit in the state of Colorado.

Hahns Peak was named after Joseph Hahn, a gold miner who, with companions William Doyle and George Wray came to the area in the 1860s. Hahns Peak Village is named after the peak. A fire lookout tower was built by the United States Forest Service on the peak's summit in 1912 and was used until 1946. After falling into disrepair, it was restored in the summer of 2016 and 2017.
