= Wolcott, Colorado =

Unincorporated community in Colorado, US

- Census-designated place
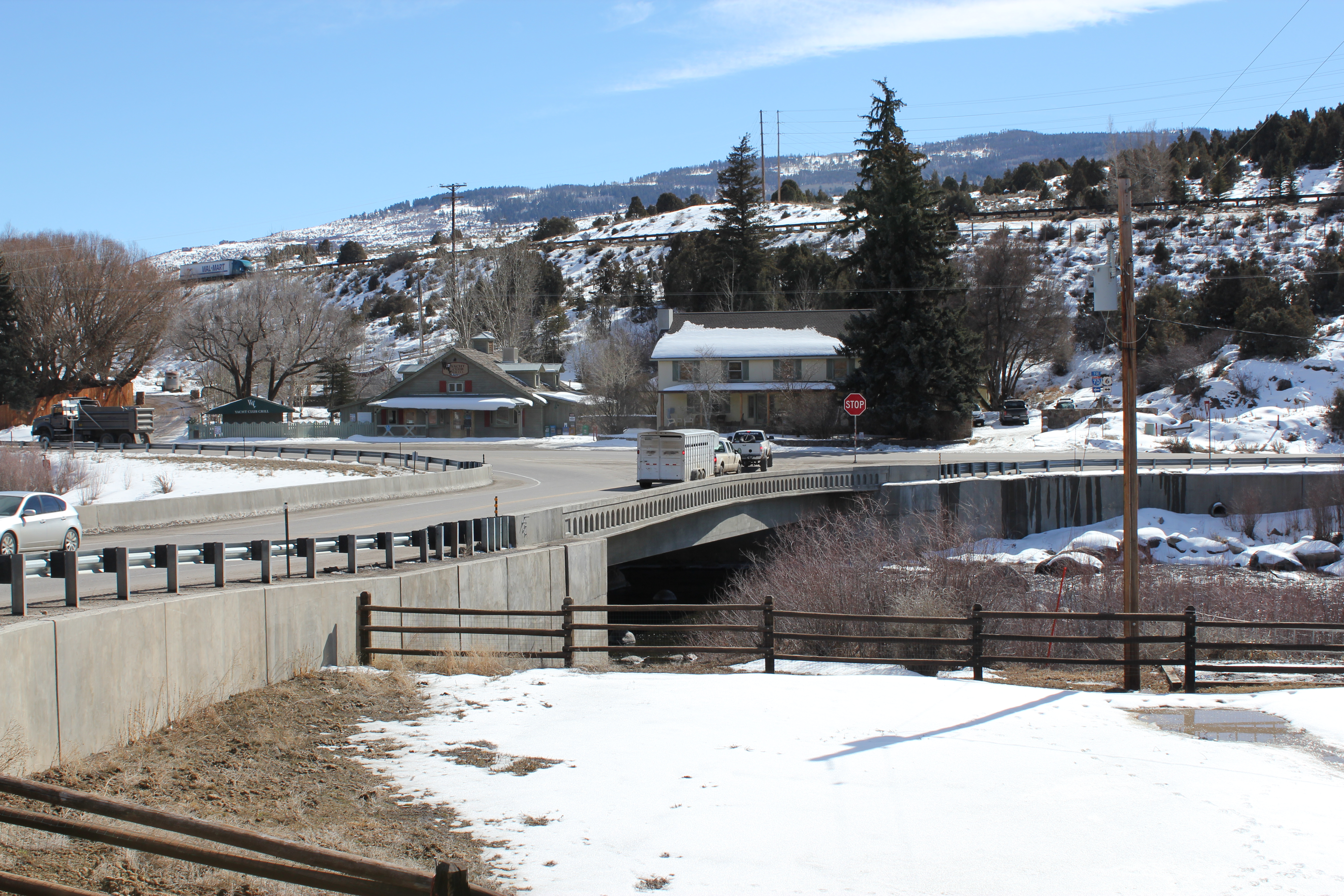
- Bridge over the Eagle River in Wolcott.

- Location of the Wolcott CDP in Eagle County, Colorado
- Coordinates: 39°42′12″N 106°40′48″W
- Country: United States
- State: Colorado
- County: Eagle County

Government
  - Type: unincorporated town

Area
  - Total: 0.385 sq mi (0.996 km^{2})
  - Land: 0.369 sq mi (0.956 km^{2})
  - Water: 0.015 sq mi (0.040 km^{2})
- Elevation: 7,044 ft (2,147 m)

Population (2020)
  - Total: 20
  - Density: 54/sq mi (21/km^{2})
- Time zone: UTC-7 (MST)
  - Summer (DST): UTC-6 (MDT)
- ZIP Code: 81655
- Area code: 970
- GNIS feature: 2583318

Wolcott is an unincorporated town, a post office, and a census-designated place (CDP) located in and governed by Eagle County, Colorado, United States. The CDP is a part of the Edwards, CO Micropolitan Statistical Area. The Wolcott post office has the ZIP Code 81655 (post office boxes). At the United States Census 2020, the population of the Wolcott CDP was 20.

== History ==
The Wolcott Post Office has been in operation since 1889. The community was named after Edward O. Wolcott, a United States Senator from Colorado.

== Geography ==
Wolcott is located in central Eagle County in the valley of the Eagle River, a west-flowing tributary of the Colorado River. U.S. Route 6 passes through the community, following the river, while Interstate 70 forms the southern edge of the CDP, with access from Exit 157. I-70 and US-6 each lead 7 miles (11 km) east to Edwards and west 10 miles (16 km) to Eagle, the county seat. Colorado State Highway 131 intersects I-70 at Exit 157, passes through the center of Wolcott, and leads north 72 miles (116 km) to Steamboat Springs.

The Wolcott CDP has an area of 246 acres (0.996 km^{2}), including 9.9 acres (0.040 km^{2}) of water.

== Demographics ==
The United States Census Bureau initially defined the Wolcott CDP for the United States Census 2010.

Wolcott CDP, Colorado
Year	Pop.	±%
2010	15	—
2020	20	+33.3%
Source: United States Census Bureau

== Education ==
It is in the Eagle County School District RE 50.

== See also ==
- Edwards, CO Micropolitan Statistical Area
