= First National Bank Building (Steamboat Springs, Colorado) =

- U.S. National Register of Historic Places
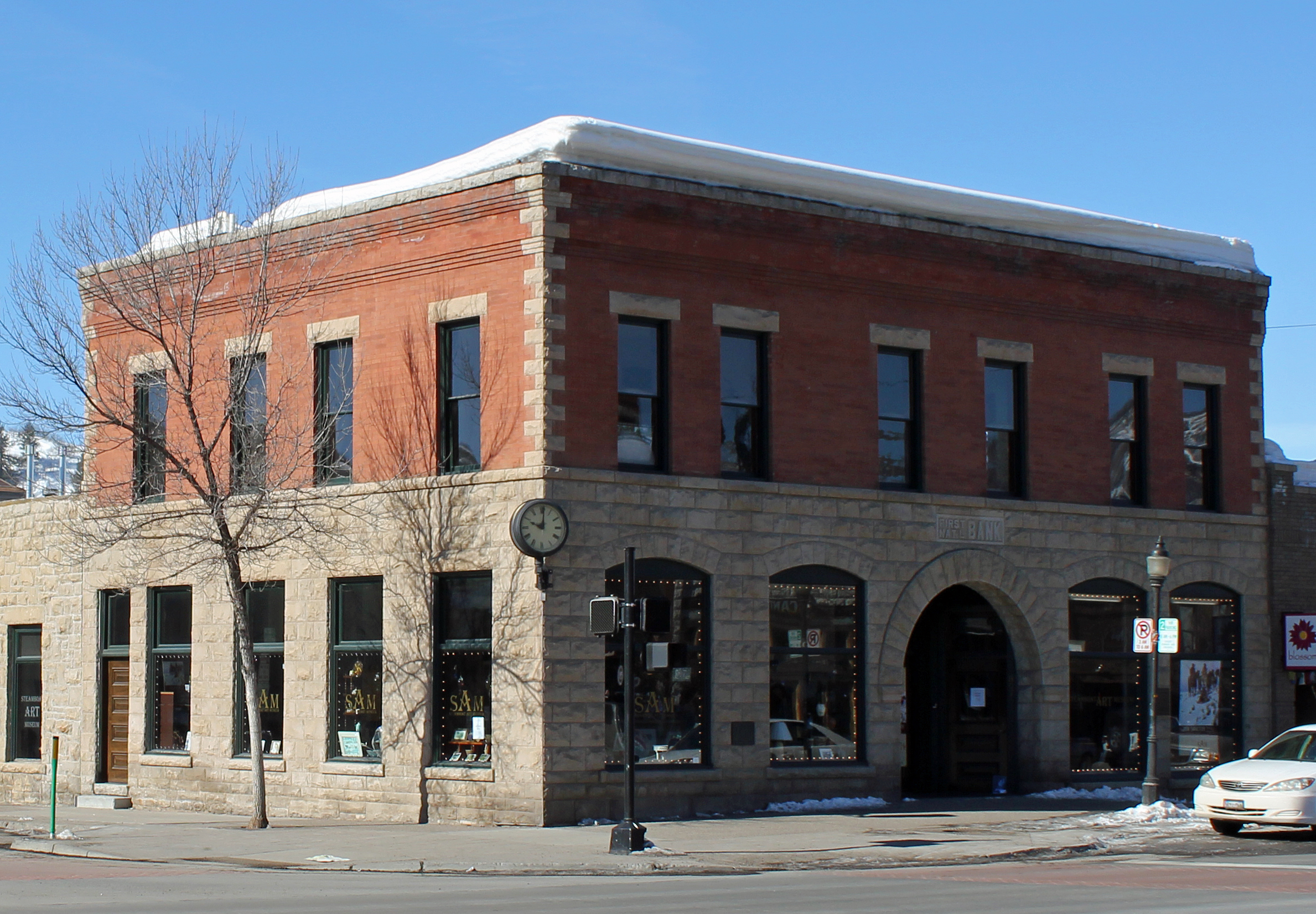

- Location within Colorado
- Location: 803-807 Lincoln Ave., and 57 1/2 8th St., Steamboat Springs, Colorado
- Coordinates: 40°29′10″N 106°50′04″W
- Area: less than one acre
- Built: 1905
- Architectural style: Romanesque Revival
- NRHP reference No.: 00001624
- Added to NRHP: January 11, 2001

The First National Bank Building in Steamboat Springs, Colorado was built in 1905. It was listed on the National Register of Historic Places in 2001.

It is a rare local example of Romanesque Revival architecture. The two-story commercial building constructed in 1905 was nearly square in plan; with a 1920 one-story rear addition, it is about 50 by 140 feet (15 m × 43 m) in plan.
