= Clark, Colorado =

Unincorporated community in Routt County, CO, USA

Clark
- Unincorporated community
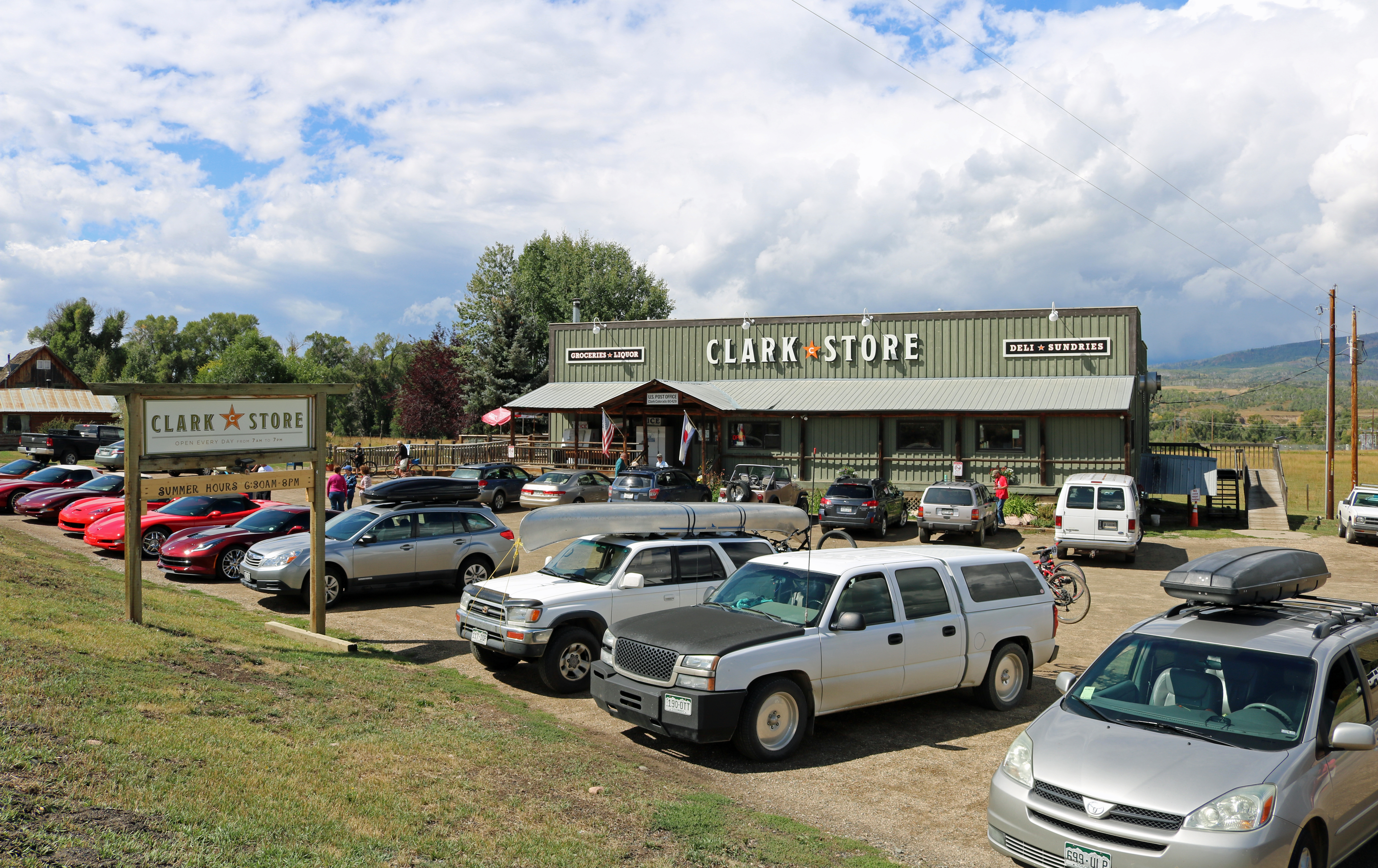
- The Clark Store in Clark, September 2016

- Location within the state of Colorado
- Coordinates: 40°42′22″N 106°55′09″W
- Country: United States
- State: State of Colorado
- County: Routt County
- Elevation: 7,261 ft (2,213 m)
- Time zone: UTC-7 (MST)
  - Summer (DST): UTC-6 (MDT)
- ZIP Code: 80428
- GNIS feature ID: 172283

Clark is an unincorporated community and U.S. Post Office in Routt County, Colorado, United States. The Clark Post Office has the ZIP Code 80428.
