= Oak Creek, Colorado =

Town in Routt County, Colorado, United States

- Town
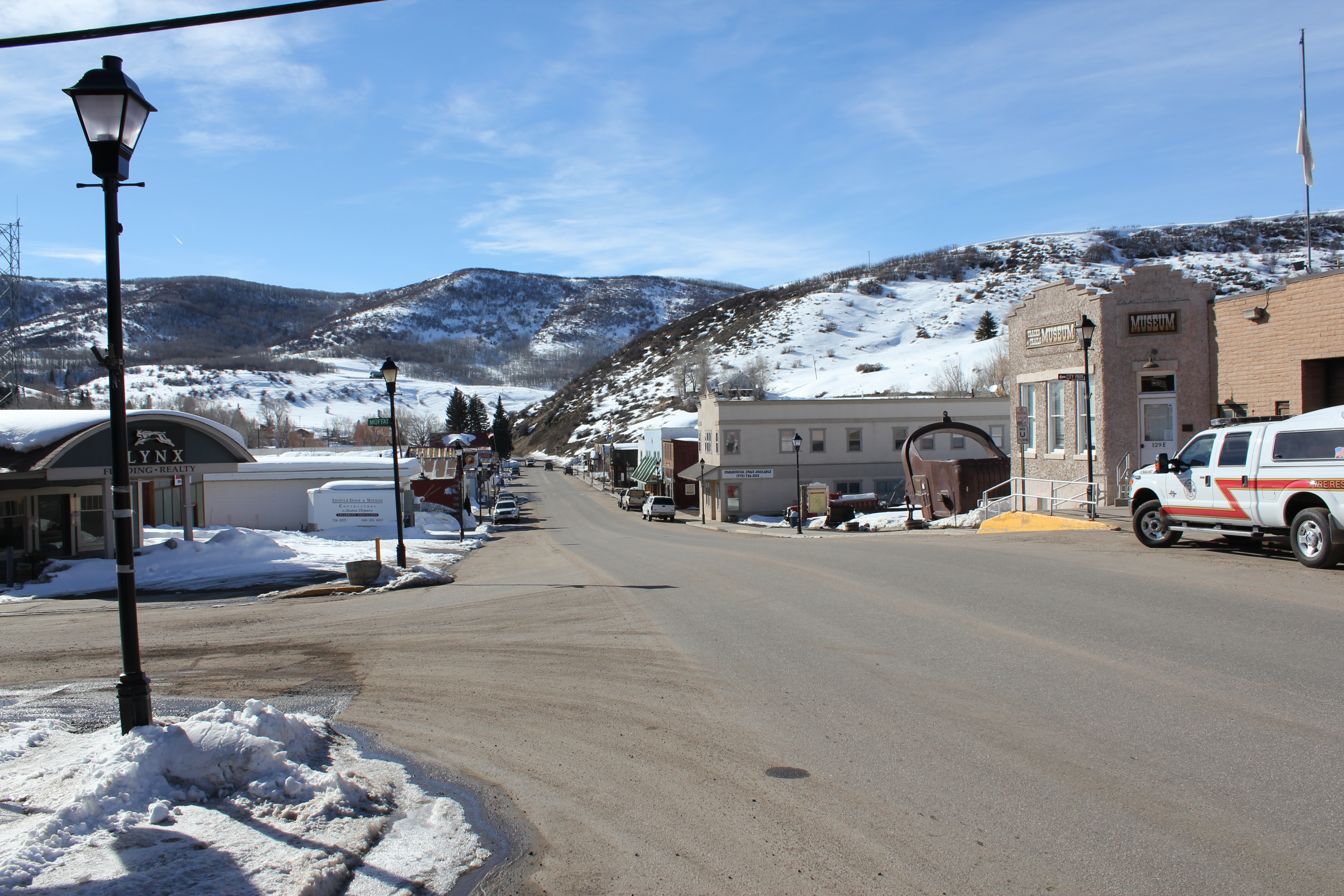
- Main Street in Oak Creek.

- Location of Oak Creek in Routt County, Colorado.
- Coordinates: 40°16′26″N 106°57′28″W
- Country: United States
- State: Colorado
- County: Routt
- Incorporated (town): December 26, 1907

Government
  - Type: Statutory Town

Area
  - Total: 0.36 sq mi (0.92 km^{2})
  - Land: 0.36 sq mi (0.92 km^{2})
  - Water: 0 sq mi (0.00 km^{2})
- Elevation: 7,438 ft (2,267 m)

Population (2020)
  - Total: 889
  - Density: 2,500/sq mi (970/km^{2})
- Time zone: UTC-7 (Mountain (MST))
  - Summer (DST): UTC-6 (MDT)
- ZIP code: 80467
- Area code: 970
- FIPS code: 08-55155
- GNIS feature ID: 2413061
- Website: townofoakcreek.colorado.gov

Oak Creek is a Statutory Town in Routt County, Colorado, United States. The population was 889 at the 2020 census.

== History ==
The town was incorporated in 1907 as a coal mining town. The community was named for scrub oak near the original town site.

== Geography ==
According to the United States Census Bureau, the town has a total area of 0.3 square miles (0.78 km^{2}), all of it land.

== Demographics ==
Historical population
Census	Pop.	Note	%±
1910	222		—
1920	967		335.6%
1930	1,211		25.2%
1940	1,769		46.1%
1950	1,488		−15.9%
1960	666		−55.2%
1970	492		−26.1%
1980	929		88.8%
1990	673		−27.6%
2000	849		26.2%
2010	884		4.1%
2020	889		0.6%

As of the census of 2000, there were 849 people, 366 households, and 217 families residing in the town. The population density was 2,937.2 inhabitants per square mile (1,134.1/km^{2}). There were 441 housing units at an average density of 1,525.7 units per square mile (589.1 units/km^{2}). The racial makeup of the town was 93.40% White, 2.47% Native American, 0.71% Asian, 0.71% from other races, and 2.71% from two or more races. Hispanic or Latino of any race were 4.59% of the population.

There were 366 households, out of which 31.4% had children under the age of 18 living with them, 43.7% were married couples living together, 8.5% had a female householder with no husband present, and 40.7% were non-families. 32.0% of all households were made up of individuals, and 7.9% had someone living alone who was 65 years of age or older. The average household size was 2.32 and the average family size was 2.90.

In the town, the population was spread out, with 25.9% under the age of 18, 8.4% from 18 to 24, 33.3% from 25 to 44, 24.6% from 45 to 64, and 7.8% who were 65 years of age or older. The median age was 35 years. For every 100 females, there were 102.1 males. For every 100 females age 18 and over, there were 113.2 males.

The median income for a household in the town was $36,500, and the median income for a family was $42,981. Males had a median income of $30,667 versus $21,116 for females. The per capita income for the town was $16,388. About 6.2% of families and 10.5% of the population were below the poverty line, including 9.4% of those under age 18 and 17.2% of those age 65 or over.

== Education ==
The community is in the South Routt School District RE-3.

== See also ==
- List of municipalities in Colorado
