= List of populated places in Colorado by county: A–E =

The location of the State of Colorado in the United States of America.

The 64 counties of the U.S. State of Colorado.

See also the Alphabetical list of populated places in Colorado.

This is a list of more than 3,800 currently, or formerly, inhabited places in the U.S. State of Colorado sorted by county. (Note: This list includes 1913 Colorado places selectively downloaded from the Geographic Names Information System on October 15, 2023.)
Currently inhabited places in Colorado include the:

- 273 municipalities from the List of municipalities in Colorado
- 210 census-designated places from the List of census-designated places in Colorado
- 64 counties from the List of counties in Colorado.
- 8 military bases from the List of military installations in Colorado
- 2 Native American reservations from the List of Native American reservations in Colorado

This list also includes the current and extinct populated places found in the:

- Geographic Names Information System
- United States Geological Survey historic trail maps
- List of county seats in Colorado
- List of forts in Colorado
- List of ghost towns in Colorado
- List of National Register of Historic Places in Colorado
- List of post offices in Colorado
- List of trading posts in Colorado

- For important dates associated with many of these places, please see the List of municipalities in Colorado and the List of post offices in Colorado.
- For the ZIP Codes for many of these places, please see the List of post offices in Colorado.
- For the telephone area codes for many of these places, please see the List of Colorado telephone area codes.
- For all federally recognized place names in Colorado, please see the Geographic Names Information System.

| † | County seat |
| ‡ | Former county seat |
| # | State capital |
| ⁂ | Former territorial capital |

Select a Colorado county:

- Adams
- Alamosa
- Arapahoe
- Archuleta
- Baca
- Bent
- Boulder
- Broomfield
- Chaffee
- Cheyenne
- Clear Creek
- Conejos
- Costilla
- Crowley
- Custer
- Delta
- Denver
- Dolores
- Douglas
- Eagle
- El Paso
- Elbert
- Fremont
- Garfield
- Gilpin
- Grand
- Gunnison
- Hinsdale
- Huerfano
- Jackson
- Jefferson
- Kiowa
- Kit Carson
- La Plata
- Lake
- Larimer
- Las Animas
- Lincoln
- Logan
- Mesa
- Mineral
- Moffat
- Montezuma
- Montrose
- Morgan
- Otero
- Ouray
- Park
- Phillips
- Pitkin
- Prowers
- Pueblo
- Rio Blanco
- Rio Grande
- Routt
- Saguache
- San Juan
- San Miguel
- Sedgwick
- Summit
- Teller
- Washington
- Weld
- Yuma

== Adams County ==
Select the OpenStreetMap link at the right to view the location of places in this section.

| Place | Type | ZIP Code | Location | Elevation |
|---|---|---|---|---|
| Adams City | Commerce City neighborhood | 80022 | 39.8267°N 104.9289°W | 5,135 feet (1,565 m) |
| Altura | unincorporated community | 80011 | | |
| Arvada (Note: The City of Arvada straddles both Jefferson and Adams counties.) | home rule city | 80001-80007; 80403 | See also Arvada in Jefferson County. | |
| Aurora (Note: The City of Aurora straddles Arapahoe, Adams, and Douglas counties.) | home rule city | 80010-80019; 80040-80047; 80247 | See also Aurora in Arapahoe County. | |
| Barr | former post office | 80603 | | |
| Barr Lake | unincorporated community | 80603 | 39.9444°N 104.7752°W | 5,115 feet (1,559 m) |
| Bashor | former post office | | | |
| Bennet | see Bennett | | | |
| Bennett (Note: The Town of Bennett straddles both Adams and Arapahoe counties.) | statutory town | 80102 | 39.7589°N 104.4275°W | 5,486 feet (1,672 m) |
| Berkeley Gardens | unincorporated community | 80221 | 39.7947°N 105.0347°W | 5,285 feet (1,611 m) |
| Berkley | census-designated place | 80221 | 39.8044°N 105.0261°W | 5,217 feet (1,590 m) |
| Bird | former post office | | | |
| Boston Heights | Aurora neighborhood | 80010 | 39.7436°N 104.8517°W | 5,371 feet (1,637 m) |
| Brighton† (Note: Brighton has been the seat of Adams County, Colorado since the county was created on November 15, 1902. The City of Brighton now also extends into Weld County.) | home rule city | 80601-80603; 80640 | 39.9853°N 104.8205°W | 4,987 feet (1,520 m) |
| Bunell | former post office | 80045 | | |
| Cabin Creek | unincorporated community | 80103 | 39.7405°N 104.0305°W | 5,062 feet (1,543 m) |
| Camp Speer | former post office | | | |
| College Hills | Westminster neighborhood | 80031 | 39.9039°N 105.0306°W | 5,256 feet (1,602 m) |
| Comanche | unincorporated community | 80136 | 39.9855°N 104.3005°W | 4,934 feet (1,504 m) |
| Commerce City | home rule city | 80022, 80037; 80216, 80603; 80640 | 39.8083°N 104.9339°W | 5,161 feet (1,573 m) |
| Cotton Creek | Westminster neighborhood | 80031 | 39.8947°N 105.0436°W | 5,322 feet (1,622 m) |
| Cozy Corner | Westminster neighborhood | 80234 | 39.9139°N 105.0258°W | 5,220 feet (1,591 m) |
| Derblay | former post office | 80640 | | |
| Derby | census-designated place | 80022 | 39.8394°N 104.9186°W | 5,128 feet (1,563 m) |
| Duff | former post office | 80239 | | |
| Dupont | unincorporated community | 80024 | 39.8380°N 104.9119°W | 5,144 feet (1,568 m) |
| Eastlake | unincorporated community | 80614 | 39.9239°N 104.9614°W | 5,269 feet (1,606 m) |
| Eno | Commerce City neighborhood | 80022 | 39.8872°N 104.8441°W | 5,121 feet (1,561 m) |
| Eskdale | former post office | | | |
| Fairview | unincorporated community | 80221 | 39.8383°N 105.0183°W | 5,358 feet (1,633 m) |
| Federal Heights | home rule city | 80260, 80221; 80234 | 39.8514°N 104.9986°W | 5,302 feet (1,616 m) |
| Fitzsimons Army Medical Center | historic U.S. Army hospital | 80045 | | |
| Fletcher | see Aurora | | | |
| Fort Convenience | historic trading post | 80229 | | |
| Friendly Village | Aurora neighborhood | 80011 | 39.7439°N 104.7886°W | 5,413 feet (1,650 m) |
| Frost | former post office | | | |
| Fulton | former post office | | | |
| Gateway Park | Aurora neighborhood | 80010 | 39.7436°N 104.8611°W | 5,361 feet (1,634 m) |
| Harris | see Westminster | | | |
| Harris Park | Westminster neighborhood | 80030 | 39.8319°N 105.0383°W | 5,331 feet (1,625 m) |
| Hazeltine | Commerce City neighborhood | 80640 | 39.8967°N 104.8830°W | 5,052 feet (1,540 m) |
| Hazeltine Heights | unincorporated community | 80640 | 39.8855°N 104.8897°W | 5,082 feet (1,549 m) |
| Henderson | Commerce City neighborhood | 80640 | 39.9205°N 104.8658°W | 5,023 feet (1,531 m) |
| Henderson Island (Note: Henderson Island is now the Adams County Fairground.) | ghost town | 80601 | 39.9300°N 104.8687°W | 5,010 feet (1,527 m) |
| Hidden Creek Park | Westminster neighborhood | 80030 | 39.8381°N 105.0428°W | 5,384 feet (1,641 m) |
| Hidden Lake | unincorporated community | 80221 | 39.8164°N 105.0300°W | 5,295 feet (1,614 m) |
| Hi-Land Acres | unincorporated community | 80602 | 39.9883°N 104.8775°W | 5,141 feet (1,567 m) |
| Hillcrest | Aurora neighborhood | 80011 | | |
| Hillcrest Village | Aurora neighborhood | 80011 | 39.7461°N 104.8211°W | 5,358 feet (1,633 m) |
| Holiday Hills Village | Federal Heights neighborhood | 80260 | 39.8661°N 105.0086°W | 5,351 feet (1,631 m) |
| Homestead Heights | unincorporated community | 80260 | 39.8611°N 105.0139°W | 5,469 feet (1,667 m) |
| Hughes | see Brighton | | | |
| Irondale | unincorporated community | 80022 | 39.8494°N 104.8972°W | 5,138 feet (1,566 m) |
| Island Station | see Henderson Island | | | |
| Kimberly Hills | Federal Heights neighborhood | 80260 | 39.8675°N 105.0186°W | 5,430 feet (1,655 m) |
| Lakeview Estates | Westminster neighborhood | 80030 | 39.8247°N 105.0481°W | 5,299 feet (1,615 m) |
| Leader | unincorporated community | 80103 | 39.8994°N 104.0563°W | 4,862 feet (1,482 m) |
| Living Springs | unincorporated community | 80136 | 39.8914°N 104.3005°W | 5,072 feet (1,546 m) |
| Lochbuie (Note: The Town of Lochbuie straddles both Weld and Adams counties.) | statutory town | 80603 | See also Lochbuie in Weld County. | |
| Magnolia | Aurora neighborhood | 80239 | 39.7667°N 104.8317°W | 5,341 feet (1,628 m) |
| Manila | unincorporated community | 80102 | 39.7564°N 104.5225°W | 5,538 feet (1,688 m) |
| Mountain View Estates | unincorporated community | 80023 | 39.9694°N 105.0300°W | 5,374 feet (1,638 m) |
| Norfolk Glen | Aurora neighborhood | 80011 | 39.7436°N 104.8000°W | 5,453 feet (1,662 m) |
| North Pecos | unincorporated community | 80221 | | |
| North Washington | census-designated place | 80216 | 39.8072°N 104.9789°W | 5,190 feet (1,582 m) |
| Northborough Heights | Federal Heights neighborhood | 80260 | 39.8792°N 105.0200°W | 5,548 feet (1,691 m) |
| Northglenn (Note: The City of Northglenn straddles both Adams and Weld counties.) | home rule city | 80233-80234; 80241, 80260 | 39.8855°N 104.9872°W | 5,371 feet (1,637 m) |
| Oleson | former post office | | | |
| Perl-Mack | former post office | 80221 | | |
| Pioneer Mobile Gardens | unincorporated community | 80221 | | |
| Quail Hill | Westminster neighborhood | 80023 | 39.9631°N 105.0022°W | 5,262 feet (1,604 m) |
| Quimby | Thornton neighborhood | 80229 | 39.8733°N 104.9439°W | 5,190 feet (1,582 m) |
| Rolla | Commerce City neighborhood | 80640 | 39.8692°N 104.8914°W | 5,102 feet (1,555 m) |
| Sable | Aurora neighborhood | 80239 | 39.7664°N 104.8311°W | 5,341 feet (1,628 m) |
| Scranton | former post office | | | |
| Shamrock | unincorporated community | 80701 | 39.8853°N 103.8163°W | 4,892 feet (1,491 m) |
| Shaw Heights | census-designated place | 80031 | 39.8525°N 105.0431°W | 5,449 feet (1,661 m) |
| Sherrelwood | census-designated place | 80221 | 39.8378°N 105.0014°W | 5,292 feet (1,613 m) |
| Sherrelwood Estates | unincorporated community | 80221 | 39.8447°N 105.0094°W | 5,387 feet (1,642 m) |
| Sigman | former post office | | | |
| Simpson | former post office | | | |
| Skyline Vista | Westminster neighborhood | 80030 | 39.8306°N 105.0200°W | 5,318 feet (1,621 m) |
| Strasburg (Note: The Strasburg CDP straddles both Adams and Arapahoe counties.) | census-designated place | 80136 | 39.7383°N 104.3233°W | 5,381 feet (1,640 m) |
| Sunset Ridge | Westminster neighborhood | 80031 | 39.8661°N 105.0344°W | 5,489 feet (1,673 m) |
| Swinford | former post office | | | |
| Tennyson Park | Arvada neighborhood | 80003 | 39.8111°N 105.0486°W | 5,308 feet (1,618 m) |
| Thedalund | former post office | | | |
| Thornton (Note: The City of Thornton straddles both Adams and Weld counties.) | home rule city | 80241, 80023, 80221, 80229, 80233, 80260, 80602 | 39.8680°N 104.9719°W | 5,348 feet (1,630 m) |
| Todd Creek | census-designated place | 80602 | 39.9780°N 104.8733°W | 5,052 feet (1,540 m) |
| Twin Lakes | census-designated place | 80221 | 39.8250°N 105.0047°W | 5,246 feet (1,599 m) |
| Utah Junction | unincorporated community | 80216 | 39.8005°N 104.9980°W | 5,230 feet (1,594 m) |
| Wandering View | Westminster neighborhood | 80031 | 39.8883°N 105.0303°W | 5,466 feet (1,666 m) |
| Washburn | former post office | 80640 | | |
| Watkins (Note: The Watkins CDP straddles both Arapahoe and Adams counties.) | census-designated place | 80137 | See also Watkins in Arapahoe County. | |
| Welby | census-designated place | 80229 | 39.8367°N 104.9591°W | 5,135 feet (1,565 m) |
| Western Hills | unincorporated community | 80221 | 39.8322°N 104.9972°W | 5,253 feet (1,601 m) |
| Westminster (Note: The City of Westminster straddles both Adams and Jefferson counties.) | home rule city | 80030-80031; 80035-80036; 80003, 80005; 80020, 80021; 80023, 80221; 80234, 80241; 80260 | 39.8367°N 105.0372°W | 5,381 feet (1,640 m) |
| Westminster Hills | Westminster neighborhood | 80031 | 39.8450°N 105.0458°W | 5,404 feet (1,647 m) |
| Westview | Westminster neighborhood | 80234 | 39.8908°N 105.0014°W | 5,417 feet (1,651 m) |
| Zuni | unincorporated community | 80221 | 39.8033°N 105.0216°W | 5,210 feet (1,588 m) |

== Alamosa County ==
Select the OpenStreetMap link at the right to view the location of places in this section.

| Place | Type | ZIP Code | Location | Elevation |
|---|---|---|---|---|
| Alamosa† (Note: Alamosa has been the seat of Alamosa County, Colorado since the county was created on March 8, 1913.) | home rule city | 81101-81102 | 37.4694°N 105.8700°W | 7,543 feet (2,299 m) |
| Alamosa East | census-designated place | 81101 | 37.4767°N 105.8397°W | 7,539 feet (2,298 m) |
| Catherin | former post office | | | |
| East Alamosa | see Alamosa East | | | |
| Estrella | unincorporated community | 81101 | 37.3661°N 105.9245°W | 7,569 feet (2,307 m) |
| Garnett | former post office | | | |
| Garrison | see Hooper | | | |
| Hartner | unincorporated community | 81101 | 37.3925°N 105.9100°W | 7,559 feet (2,304 m) |
| Henry | unincorporated community | 81101 | 37.3983°N 105.9070°W | 7,552 feet (2,302 m) |
| Hirst | former post office | | | |
| Hooper | statutory town | 81136 | 37.7428°N 105.8753°W | 7,559 feet (2,304 m) |
| La Fruto | unincorporated community | 81101 | 37.4147°N 105.8986°W | 7,543 feet (2,299 m) |
| Medano Springs | former post office | | | |
| Montville | former post office | | | |
| Mosca | unincorporated community | 81146 | 37.6483°N 105.8739°W | 7,559 feet (2,304 m) |
| Mosco | former post office | | | |
| Orean | former post office | | | |
| Parma | unincorporated community | 81144 | 37.5372°N 106.0386°W | 7,608 feet (2,319 m) |
| Rio Grande | former post office | | | |
| Streater | see Mosca | | | |
| Waverly | unincorporated community | 81101 | 37.4297°N 106.0061°W | 7,589 feet (2,313 m) |
| Zapato | former post office | | | |

== Arapahoe County ==
Select the OpenStreetMap link at the right to view the location of places in this section.

| Place | Type | ZIP Code | Location | Elevation |
|---|---|---|---|---|
| Aetna Estates | census-designated place | 80018 | 39.7381°N 104.6732°W | 5,614 feet (1,711 m) |
| Air Reserve Personnel Center | U.S. Air Force personnel center | 80011 | 39.7081°N 104.7733°W | 5,530 feet (1,686 m) |
| Algonquin Acres | unincorporated community | 80111 | 39.5983°N 104.8264°W | 5,663 feet (1,726 m) |
| Altura | unincorporated community | 80011 | 39.7403°N 104.8044°W | 5,430 feet (1,655 m) |
| Apache Mesa | Aurora neighborhood | 80011 | 39.7319°N 104.7958°W | 5,463 feet (1,665 m) |
| Aurora | home rule city | 80010-80019; 80040-80047; 80247 | 39.7294°N 104.8319°W | 5,404 feet (1,647 m) |
| Aurora Heights | Aurora neighborhood | 80010 | 39.7364°N 104.8575°W | 5,404 feet (1,647 m) |
| Aurora Highlands | Aurora neighborhood | 80017 | 39.6897°N 104.7797°W | 5,577 feet (1,700 m) |
| Aurora Hills | Aurora neighborhood | 80012 | 39.7069°N 104.8472°W | 5,515 feet (1,681 m) |
| Aurora Knolls | Aurora neighborhood | 80013 | 39.6806°N 104.7778°W | 5,656 feet (1,724 m) |
| Beaver Creek | former post office | | | |
| Bennett | statutory town | 80102 | See also Bennett in Adams County. | |
| Bow Mar (Note: The Town of Bow Mar straddles both Arapahoe and Jefferson counties.) | statutory town | 80123 | 39.6283°N 105.0500°W | 5,518 feet (1,682 m) |
| Brick Center | census-designated place | 80102 | 39.6001°N 104.4579°W | 5,823 feet (1,775 m) |
| Broadway Estates | Centennial neighborhood | 80122 | 39.5900°N 104.9836°W | 5,518 feet (1,682 m) |
| Brookvale | Aurora neighborhood | 80017 | 39.6917°N 104.8000°W | 5,505 feet (1,678 m) |
| Buckingham | Aurora neighborhood | 80012 | | |
| Buckley Space Force Base | U.S. Space Force | 80011 | 39.7112°N 104.7626°W | 5,571 feet (1,698 m) |
| Byers | census-designated place | 80103 | 39.7114°N 104.2277°W | 5,203 feet (1,586 m) |
| Cary | former post office | | | |
| Castlewood | Centennial neighborhood | 80112 | 39.5847°N 104.9011°W | 5,728 feet (1,746 m) |
| Centennial | home rule city | 80015-80016; 80111-80112; 80121-80122 | 39.5792°N 104.8769°W | 5,837 feet (1,779 m) |
| Centrepoint | Aurora neighborhood | 80012 | 39.7064°N 104.8153°W | 5,509 feet (1,679 m) |
| Chadsford | Aurora neighborhood | 80014 | 39.6725°N 104.8161°W | 5,620 feet (1,713 m) |
| Chambers Heights | Aurora neighborhood | 80011 | 39.7322°N 104.8161°W | 5,433 feet (1,656 m) |
| Chapparal | Aurora neighborhood | 80016 | 39.5869°N 104.7658°W | 5,965 feet (1,818 m) |
| Cherrelyn | former post office | 80110 | | |
| Cherry Creek | census-designated place | 80111 | 39.6345°N 104.8829°W | 5,643 feet (1,720 m) |
| Cherry Creek East | Aurora neighborhood | 80016 | 39.5992°N 104.8014°W | 5,689 feet (1,734 m) |
| Cherry Hills Village | home rule city | 80110-80111; 80113, 80121 | 39.6417°N 104.9594°W | 5,423 feet (1,653 m) |
| Cherry Knolls | Centennial neighborhood | 80122 | 39.5917°N 104.9508°W | 5,607 feet (1,709 m) |
| Cherry Ridge | Cherry Hills Village neighborhood | 80121 | 39.6267°N 104.9389°W | 5,492 feet (1,674 m) |
| Colfax Village | Aurora neighborhood | 80010 | 39.7292°N 104.8706°W | 5,397 feet (1,645 m) |
| College View | former post office | | | |
| Columbine (Note: The Columbine CDP straddles both Jefferson and Arapahoe counties.) | census-designated place | 80128 | See also Columbine in Jefferson County. | |
| Columbine Heights | unincorporated community | 80123 | 39.5964°N 105.0494°W | 5,427 feet (1,654 m) |
| Columbine Lakes | unincorporated community | 80123 | 39.6047°N 105.0444°W | 5,400 feet (1,646 m) |
| Columbine Manor | unincorporated community | 80128 | 39.5853°N 105.0519°W | 5,436 feet (1,657 m) |
| Columbine Valley | statutory town | 80123 | 39.6011°N 105.0322°W | 5,348 feet (1,630 m) |
| Comanche Creek | census-designated place | 80136 | 39.6150°N 104.3268°W | 5,627 feet (1,715 m) |
| Coventry | Littleton neighborhood | 80021 | 39.6047°N 105.0508°W | 5,449 feet (1,661 m) |
| Cross Creek | Aurora neighborhood | 80018 | 39.7219°N 104.7086°W | 5,584 feet (1,702 m) |
| Deer Trail | statutory town | 80105 | 39.6150°N 104.0444°W | 5,190 feet (1,582 m) |
| Deertrail | see Deer Trail | | | |
| Del Mar | Aurora neighborhood | 80010 | 39.7289°N 104.8575°W | 5,410 feet (1,649 m) |
| Devonsire Heights | unincorporated community | 80113 | 39.6489°N 104.9486°W | 5,456 feet (1,663 m) |
| Dove Hill | unincorporated community | 80016 | 39.6206°N 104.7119°W | 5,935 feet (1,809 m) |
| Dove Valley | census-designated place | 80112 | 39.5777°N 104.8294°W | 5,735 feet (1,748 m) |
| East Quincy Highlands | Aurora neighborhood | 80018 | 39.6447°N 104.7311°W | 5,814 feet (1,772 m) |
| Eastridge | Aurora neighborhood | 80014 | 39.6711°N 104.8567°W | 5,630 feet (1,716 m) |
| Englewood | home rule city | 80110-80113; 80150-80155 | 39.6478°N 104.9878°W | 5,371 feet (1,637 m) |
| Fountain Side | unincorporated community | 80012 | 39.6875°N 104.8594°W | 5,518 feet (1,682 m) |
| Four Square Mile | census-designated place | 80231 | 39.6807°N 104.8879°W | 5,440 feet (1,658 m) |
| Foxfield | statutory town | 80016 | 39.5917°N 104.7925°W | 5,755 feet (1,754 m) |
| Gateway | Aurora neighborhood | 80014 | | |
| Glendale | home rule city | 80246 | 39.7050°N 104.9336°W | 5,351 feet (1,631 m) |
| Goldenwest Park | Littleton neighborhood | 80120 | 39.5858°N 105.0194°W | 5,463 feet (1,665 m) |
| Greenwood Village | home rule city | 80110-80112; 80121, 80155 | 39.6172°N 104.9508°W | 5,469 feet (1,667 m) |
| Gun Club Estates | unincorporated community | 80018 | 39.7000°N 104.7117°W | 5,610 feet (1,710 m) |
| Hallcrafts Village East | Aurora neighborhood | 80012 | 39.6931°N 104.8389°W | 5,551 feet (1,692 m) |
| Harbor Pointe | Aurora neighborhood | 80015 | 39.6367°N 104.8250°W | 5,682 feet (1,732 m) |
| Havana Village | Aurora neighborhood | 80012 | 39.7000°N 104.8597°W | 5,479 feet (1,670 m) |
| Heather Ridge | Aurora neighborhood | 80014 | 39.6772°N 104.8408°W | 5,584 feet (1,702 m) |
| Heritage | former post office | | | |
| Highland Park | Aurora neighborhood | 80010 | 39.7214°N 104.8600°W | 5,430 feet (1,655 m) |
| Highpoint | Aurora neighborhood | 80013 | 39.6458°N 104.7647°W | 5,738 feet (1,749 m) |
| Hillside | Aurora neighborhood | 80010 | 39.7336°N 104.8669°W | 5,381 feet (1,640 m) |
| Hillside Manor | Littleton neighborhood | 80123 | 39.6206°N 105.0397°W | 5,436 feet (1,657 m) |
| Hoffman Heights | Aurora neighborhood | 80011 | | |
| Holly Hills | census-designated place | 80222 | 39.6676°N 104.9180°W | 5,505 feet (1,678 m) |
| Hutchinson Heights | Aurora neighborhood | 80013 | 39.6628°N 104.7842°W | 5,640 feet (1,719 m) |
| Inche | former post office | | | |
| Inverness | census-designated place | 80112 | 39.5774°N 104.8614°W | 5,761 feet (1,756 m) |
| Kingsborough | Aurora neighborhood | 80013 | 39.6708°N 104.7992°W | 5,597 feet (1,706 m) |
| Kirkgaard Acres | Aurora neighborhood | 80011 | 39.7347°N 104.7867°W | 5,476 feet (1,669 m) |
| La Vista | Aurora neighborhood | 80011 | 39.7300°N 104.8053°W | 5,446 feet (1,660 m) |
| Lena | former post office | | | |
| Littleton† (Note: Voters selected Littleton as the seat of South Arapahoe County, Colorado, which was renamed and re-created on November 15, 1902. Littleton has remained the seat since the county name was changed back to Arapahoe County, Colorado on April 11, 1903. The City of Littleton now also extends into Jefferson and Douglas counties.) | home rule city | 80120-80130; 80160-80166 | 39.6133°N 105.0166°W | 5,351 feet (1,631 m) |
| Logan | former post office | | | |
| Lyman | former post office | | | |
| Meadow Hills | Aurora neighborhood | 80014 | 39.6411°N 104.8172°W | 5,709 feet (1,740 m) |
| Meadowood | Aurora neighborhood | 80013 | 39.6589°N 104.8039°W | 5,673 feet (1,729 m) |
| Melvin | former post office | | | |
| Mission Viejo | Aurora neighborhood | 80013 | 39.6464°N 104.8000°W | 5,669 feet (1,728 m) |
| Nantucket | Aurora neighborhood | 80439 | 39.7167°N 104.8586°W | 5,456 feet (1,663 m) |
| Oakes | former post office | | | |
| Oakesdale | former post office | | | |
| Old Towne | Aurora neighborhood | 80012 | 39.7128°N 104.8511°W | 5,495 feet (1,675 m) |
| Palos Verdes | Centennial neighborhood | 80111 | 39.6058°N 104.9183°W | 5,614 feet (1,711 m) |
| Park East | Aurora neighborhood | 80010 | 39.7217°N 104.8531°W | 5,443 feet (1,659 m) |
| Park View | Centennial neighborhood | 80015 | 39.6128°N 104.7497°W | 5,899 feet (1,798 m) |
| Park View Estates | Aurora neighborhood | 80011 | 39.7217°N 104.8333°W | 5,449 feet (1,661 m) |
| Parkborough | Centennial neighborhood | 80015 | 39.6114°N 104.7397°W | 5,889 feet (1,795 m) |
| Peoria | census-designated place | 80103 | 39.6649°N 104.1456°W | 5,272 feet (1,607 m) |
| Peoria Park | Aurora neighborhood | 80014 | 39.6789°N 104.8519°W | 5,577 feet (1,700 m) |
| Petersburg | former post office | | | |
| Pheasant Run | Aurora neighborhood | 80015 | 39.6361°N 104.8128°W | 5,758 feet (1,755 m) |
| Piney Creek | Centennial neighborhood | 80015 | 39.6175°N 104.7917°W | 5,771 feet (1,759 m) |
| Piney Creek Ranches | Centennial neighborhood | 80016 | 39.5983°N 104.7647°W | 5,771 feet (1,759 m) |
| Queensborough | Aurora neighborhood | 80012 | 39.7000°N 104.8517°W | 5,512 feet (1,680 m) |
| Ridgewood Park | Littleton neighborhood | 80120 | 39.5903°N 105.0186°W | 5,410 feet (1,649 m) |
| Sableridge | Aurora neighborhood | 80012 | 39.6919°N 104.8236°W | 5,604 feet (1,708 m) |
| Salem | former post office | | | |
| Settlers Village | Aurora neighborhood | 80012 | 39.7003°N 104.8147°W | 5,541 feet (1,689 m) |
| Seven Hills | Aurora neighborhood | 80013 | 39.6583°N 104.7614°W | 5,623 feet (1,714 m) |
| Shenandoah | Aurora neighborhood | 80015 | 39.6269°N 104.8075°W | 5,778 feet (1,761 m) |
| Sheridan | home rule city | 80110 | 39.6469°N 105.0253°W | 5,322 feet (1,622 m) |
| Side Creek | Aurora neighborhood | 80017 | 39.6883°N 104.7661°W | 5,600 feet (1,707 m) |
| Somerset Village | Aurora neighborhood | 80017 | 39.6950°N 104.7883°W | 5,561 feet (1,695 m) |
| Southfield Park | Centennial neighborhood | 80111 | 39.6006°N 104.8433°W | 5,686 feet (1,733 m) |
| Southglenn | Centennial neighborhood | 80122 | 39.5872°N 104.9528°W | 5,587 feet (1,703 m) |
| Southpark | Littleton neighborhood | 80120 | 39.5750°N 105.0203°W | 5,489 feet (1,673 m) |
| Spring Creek Meadows | unincorporated community | 80013 | 39.6406°N 104.7467°W | 5,738 feet (1,749 m) |
| Stone Ridge Park | Aurora neighborhood | 80017 | 39.6842°N 104.7956°W | 5,548 feet (1,691 m) |
| Strasburg | census-designated place | 80136 | See also Strasburg in Adams County. | |
| Sullivan | unincorporated community | 80231 | 39.6714°N 104.8980°W | 5,479 feet (1,670 m) |
| Summer Lake | Aurora neighborhood | 80015 | 39.6364°N 104.7672°W | 5,758 feet (1,755 m) |
| Summer Valley | Aurora neighborhood | 80013 | 39.6425°N 104.7811°W | 5,666 feet (1,727 m) |
| Sundown | Aurora neighborhood | 80015 | 39.6300°N 104.8222°W | 5,659 feet (1,725 m) |
| Sunnyvale | Aurora neighborhood | 80010 | 39.7233°N 104.8725°W | 5,400 feet (1,646 m) |
| Tabor | former post office | | | |
| Thunderbird Estates | unincorporated community | 80018 | 39.7144°N 104.7081°W | 5,571 feet (1,698 m) |
| Tollgate | Aurora neighborhood | 80017 | 39.7003°N 104.7911°W | 5,525 feet (1,684 m) |
| Tower | Aurora post office | 80015 | | |
| Travois | unincorporated community | 80016 | 39.5658°N 104.7394°W | 6,132 feet (1,869 m) |
| Village East | Aurora neighborhood | 80012 | 39.6833°N 104.8508°W | 5,558 feet (1,694 m) |
| Village Green | Aurora neighborhood | 80012 | 39.6939°N 104.8136°W | 5,561 feet (1,695 m) |
| Watkins | census-designated place | 80137 | 39.6984°N 104.5772°W | 5,653 feet (1,723 m) |
| Wide Acres | Littleton neighborhood | 80120 | 39.5683°N 105.0344°W | 5,371 feet (1,637 m) |
| Willow Creek | Centennial neighborhood | 80112 | 39.5731°N 104.8947°W | 5,728 feet (1,746 m) |
| Willow Park | Aurora neighborhood | 80012 | 39.6861°N 104.8144°W | 5,558 feet (1,694 m) |
| Winnview | former post office | | | |
| Wolhurst | Littleton neighborhood | 80120 | 39.5705°N 105.0333°W | 5,371 feet (1,637 m) |
| Woodgate | Aurora neighborhood | 80015 | 39.6272°N 104.8142°W | 5,719 feet (1,743 m) |
| Woodrim | Aurora neighborhood | 80014 | 39.6783°N 104.8167°W | 5,597 feet (1,706 m) |

== Archuleta County ==
Select the OpenStreetMap link at the right to view the location of places in this section.

| Place | Type | ZIP Code | Location | Elevation |
|---|---|---|---|---|
| Altura | unincorporated community | 81147 | 37.1833°N 107.1912°W | 7,159 feet (2,182 m) |
| Arboles | census-designated place | 81121 | 37.0281°N 107.4192°W | 6,280 feet (1,914 m) |
| Cantonment at Pagosa Springs | see Fort Lewis (1878-1880) | | | |
| Carracas | unincorporated community | 81147 | 37.0050°N 107.2587°W | 6,175 feet (1,882 m) |
| Chimney Rock | unincorporated community | 81122 | 37.1944°N 107.3012°W | 7,867 feet (2,398 m) |
| Chromo | unincorporated community | 81128 | 37.0364°N 106.8434°W | 7,283 feet (2,220 m) |
| Dyke | unincorporated community | 81147 | 37.2264°N 107.1953°W | 6,808 feet (2,075 m) |
| Edith | unincorporated community | 81147 | 37.0056°N 106.9103°W | 7,080 feet (2,158 m) |
| Fort Lewis (1878-1880) | historic U.S. Army post | 81147 | | |
| Gato | ghost town | 81147 | 37.0450°N 107.1973°W | 6,302 feet (1,921 m) |
| Gladwyn | former post office | | | |
| Juanita | ghost town | 81147 | 37.0272°N 107.1506°W | 6,375 feet (1,943 m) |
| Kearns | unincorporated community | 81147 | 37.1311°N 107.1603°W | 6,844 feet (2,086 m) |
| Lonetree | unincorporated community | 81147 | 37.1681°N 107.1728°W | 7,037 feet (2,145 m) |
| Navajo | former post office | | | |
| Nutria | unincorporated community | 81147 | 37.2308°N 107.1256°W | 7,123 feet (2,171 m) |
| Pagosa Junction | ghost town | 81147 | 37.0381°N 107.1992°W | 6,266 feet (1,910 m) |
| Pagosa Springs† (Note: Pagosa Springs has been the seat of Archuleta County, Colorado since the county was created on April 14, 1885.) | home rule town | 81147, 81157 | 37.2695°N 107.0098°W | 7,126 feet (2,172 m) |
| Piedra | census-designated place | 81147 | 37.2236°N 107.3409°W | 6,572 feet (2,003 m) |
| Price | former post office | | | |
| Squaretop | former post office | | | |
| Stollsteimer | unincorporated community | 81147 | 37.1417°N 107.3548°W | 6,286 feet (1,916 m) |
| Treasure | unincorporated community | 81147 | 37.3125°N 106.9656°W | 7,293 feet (2,223 m) |
| Trujillo | unincorporated community | 81147 | 37.1006°N 107.0470°W | 6,568 feet (2,002 m) |

== Baca County ==
Select the OpenStreetMap link at the right to view the location of places in this section.

| Place | Type | ZIP Code | Location | Elevation |
|---|---|---|---|---|
| Atlanta | unincorporated community | 81064 | 37.5036°N 102.9960°W | 4,718 feet (1,438 m) |
| Baker | former post office | | | |
| Bartlett | unincorporated community | 81090 | 37.4333°N 102.1441°W | 3,776 feet (1,151 m) |
| Blaine | former post office | | | |
| Boston | former post office | | | |
| Brookfield | unincorporated community | 81054 | 37.5939°N 102.8421°W | 4,570 feet (1,393 m) |
| Buckeye Crossroads | unincorporated community | 81090 | 37.5575°N 102.1288°W | 3,763 feet (1,147 m) |
| Buckley | see Lycan | | | |
| Buster | former post office | | | |
| Campo | statutory town | 81029 | 37.1050°N 102.5796°W | 4,344 feet (1,324 m) |
| Carriso | see Carrizo | | | |
| Carriso Springs | see Carrizo Spring | | | |
| Carrizo | former post office | | | |
| Carrizo Springs | unincorporated community | 81064 | 37.1636°N 103.0349°W | 4,859 feet (1,481 m) |
| Clyde | former post office | | | |
| Corinth | former post office | | | |
| Corrizo | former post office | | | |
| Decatur | former post office | | | |
| Deora | unincorporated community | 81054 | 37.5803°N 102.9666°W | 4,672 feet (1,424 m) |
| Edler | unincorporated community | 81073 | 37.1764°N 102.7783°W | 4,652 feet (1,418 m) |
| Estelene | former post office | | | |
| Frick | unincorporated community | 81054 | 37.5853°N 102.9555°W | 4,747 feet (1,447 m) |
| Graft | unincorporated community | 81073 | 37.4478°N 102.8924°W | 4,783 feet (1,458 m) |
| Joycoy | former post office | | | |
| Kirkwell | unincorporated community | 81064 | 37.1486°N 102.9410°W | 4,905 feet (1,495 m) |
| Konantz | former post office | | | |
| Lamport | former post office | | | |
| Liberty | unincorporated community | 81073 | 37.3081°N 102.7238°W | 4,623 feet (1,409 m) |
| Lycan | unincorporated community | 81090 | 37.6153°N 102.2007°W | 3,862 feet (1,177 m) |
| Maxey | former post office | | | |
| Midway | unincorporated community | 81090 | 37.1492°N 102.1860°W | 3,845 feet (1,172 m) |
| Minneapolis | former post office | | | |
| Monon | former post office | | | |
| Murray Place | unincorporated community | 81073 | 37.5161°N 102.9971°W | 4,672 feet (1,424 m) |
| Nowlinsville | former post office | | | |
| Oklarado | former post office | | | |
| Prichett | see Pritchett | | | |
| Pride | former post office | | | |
| Pritchett | statutory town | 81064 | 37.3703°N 102.8596°W | 4,833 feet (1,473 m) |
| Progress | former post office | | | |
| Regnier | former post office | | | |
| Richards | former post office | | | |
| Rodley | former post office | | | |
| Ruff | former post office | | | |
| Sand Arroyo | former post office | | | |
| Seton | former post office | | | |
| Setonsburg | former post office | | | |
| Springfield† (Note: Springfield has been the seat of Baca County, Colorado since the county was created on April 16, 1889.) | statutory town | 81073 | 37.4083°N 102.6144°W | 4,360 feet (1,329 m) |
| Stevenson | former post office | | | |
| Stonington | unincorporated community | 81090 | 37.2936°N 102.1874°W | 3,809 feet (1,161 m) |
| Tuck | former post office | | | |
| Two Buttes | statutory town | 81084 | 37.5611°N 102.3977°W | 4,111 feet (1,253 m) |
| Utleyville | unincorporated community | 81064 | 37.2711°N 103.0313°W | 5,144 feet (1,568 m) |
| Vilas | statutory town | 81087 | 37.3736°N 102.4463°W | 4,154 feet (1,266 m) |
| Walsh | statutory town | 81090 | 37.3861°N 102.2782°W | 3,953 feet (1,205 m) |
| Wentworth | former post office | | | |

== Bent County ==
Select the OpenStreetMap link at the right to view the location of places in this section.

| Place | Type | ZIP Code | Location | Elevation |
|---|---|---|---|---|
| Able | ghost town | 81044 | 38.0606°N 102.8696°W | 3,783 feet (1,153 m) |
| Alkalai | former post office | | | |
| Bent's New Fort | historic trading post | 81052 | | |
| Bent's Second Fort | see Bent's New Fort | | | |
| Big Bend | unincorporated community | 81092 | 38.2014°N 102.7508°W | 3,816 feet (1,163 m) |
| Boggsville‡ (Note: Boggsville served as the seat of Bent County, Colorado Territory from 1870 until 1872.) | ghost town | 81054 | 38.0417°N 103.2127°W | 3,914 feet (1,193 m) |
| Caddoa | ghost town | 81044 | 38.0478°N 102.9660°W | 3,881 feet (1,183 m) |
| Cornelia | unincorporated community | 81054 | 38.0928°N 103.2883°W | 3,967 feet (1,209 m) |
| Fort Fauntleroy | see Fort Lyon (1860) | | | |
| Fort Gantt | see Gantt's Picket Post | | | |
| Fort Lyon (1860) | historic U.S. Army fort | 81054 | | |
| Fort Lyon (1867) | historic U.S. Army fort | 81038 | | |
| Fort Lyon | unincorporated community | 81054 | 38.0922°N 103.1522°W | 3,888 feet (1,185 m) |
| Fort Wise | see Fort Lyon (1860) | | | |
| Four Corners Crossing | unincorporated community | 81052 | 38.0267°N 102.7780°W | 3,855 feet (1,175 m) |
| Fredonia | former post office | | | |
| Gantt's Picket Post | historic trading post | 81054 | | |
| Gem | former post office | | | |
| Gilpin | unincorporated community | 81054 | 37.9461°N 103.1847°W | 4,209 feet (1,283 m) |
| Harbourdale | former post office | | | |
| Hasty | census-designated place | 81044 | 38.0999°N 102.9639°W | 3,924 feet (1,196 m) |
| Hilton | unincorporated community | 81054 | 38.0703°N 103.0610°W | 3,875 feet (1,181 m) |
| Keesee | unincorporated community | 81057 | 38.1364°N 102.7788°W | 3,839 feet (1,170 m) |
| Keller | unincorporated community | 81054 | 38.0628°N 103.1463°W | 3,871 feet (1,180 m) |
| Kreybill | unincorporated community | 81054 | 38.1139°N 103.1005°W | 3,904 feet (1,190 m) |
| Las Animas† (Note: On February 11, 1870, the Territory of Colorado created Bent County, Colorado Territory, with Las Animas serving as the original county seat for only a few months. Las Animas served as county seat again from 1872 until 1875, when the county seat was moved to West Las Animas. With statehood on August 1, 1876, West Las Animas became the seat of Bent County, Colorado. On September 4, 1886, West Las Animas changed its name to Las Animas, and Las Animas has served as the county seat since.) | statutory city | 81054 | 38.0667°N 103.2227°W | 3,898 feet (1,188 m) |
| Las Animas Junction | unincorporated community | 81054 | 38.0625°N 103.1741°W | 3,871 feet (1,180 m) |
| Lavender | former post office | | | |
| Lubers | unincorporated community | 81057 | 38.1289°N 102.9244°W | 3,875 feet (1,181 m) |
| Maine Ranch | former post office | | | |
| Mamre | former post office | | | |
| Marlman | unincorporated community | 81054 | 38.0936°N 103.3491°W | 4,032 feet (1,229 m) |
| Martin | see Able | | | |
| McClave | census-designated place | 81057 | 38.1375°N 102.8505°W | 3,868 feet (1,179 m) |
| Meadows | former post office | 81044 | | |
| Medford Springs | former post office | | | |
| Melina | unincorporated community | 81054 | 38.0995°N 103.1866°W | 3,930 feet (1,198 m) |
| Mud Creek | former post office | | | |
| New Fort Lyon | see Fort Lyon (1867) | | | |
| Ninaview | unincorporated community | 81054 | 37.6439°N 103.2408°W | 4,432 feet (1,351 m) |
| Old Fort Lyon | see Fort Lyon (1860) | | | |
| Old Fort Lyons | unincorporated community | 81052 | 38.0958°N 102.7727°W | 3,694 feet (1,126 m) |
| Opal | former post office | | | |
| Pinnacle | former post office | | | |
| Prowers | unincorporated community | 81044 | 38.0820°N 102.7677°W | 3,691 feet (1,125 m) |
| Rawlings | former post office | | | |
| Riverdale | unincorporated community | 81054 | 38.0586°N 103.3166°W | 3,950 feet (1,204 m) |
| Rule | former post office | | | |
| Ruxton | unincorporated community | 81054 | 37.7481°N 103.1466°W | 4,222 feet (1,287 m) |
| Stockade | former post office | | | |
| Texas Ranch | former post office | | | |
| The Meadows | former post office | | | |
| Toonerville | unincorporated community | 81054 | 37.7750°N 103.1641°W | 4,183 feet (1,275 m) |
| Wareland | unincorporated community | 80821 | 39.0925°N 103.2158°W | 5,322 feet (1,622 m) |
| West Las Animas‡ | see Las Animas | | | |

== Boulder County ==
Select the OpenStreetMap link at the right to view the location of places in this section.

| Place | Type | ZIP Code | Location | Elevation |
|---|---|---|---|---|
| Allenspark | census-designated place | 80510 | 40.1944°N 105.5256°W | 8,491 feet (2,588 m) |
| Altona | census-designated place | 80302 | 40.1254°N 105.2924°W | 5,932 feet (1,808 m) |
| Ara | Boulder neighborhood | 80301 | 40.0250°N 105.2503°W | 5,266 feet (1,605 m) |
| Arrowood | unincorporated community | 80510 | 40.1872°N 105.5108°W | 8,255 feet (2,516 m) |
| Aspen Meadows | unincorporated community | 80466 | 39.9764°N 105.4133°W | 8,110 feet (2,472 m) |
| Balarat | unincorporated community | 80540 | 40.1592°N 105.3964°W | 7,454 feet (2,272 m) |
| Bar-K Ranch | see Bark Ranch | | | |
| Bark Ranch | census-designated place | 80481 | 40.1175°N 105.4394°W | 8,510 feet (2,594 m) |
| Belle Monte | former post office | | | |
| Big Elk | see Big Elk Meadows | | | |
| Big Elk Meadows | unincorporated community | 80540 | | |
| Bonanza Mountain Estates | census-designated place | 80466 | 39.9767°N 105.4803°W | 8,445 feet (2,574 m) |
| Boulder† (Note: On November 28, 1859, the Provisional Government of the Territory of Jefferson created 12 counties, with Boulder City as the seat of Jackson County, Jefferson Territory. On November 1, 1861, the new Territory of Colorado created 17 original counties, with Boulder City as the seat of Boulder County, Colorado Territory, and since statehood on August 1, 1876, Boulder has been the seat of Boulder County, Colorado.) | home rule city | 80301-80314 | 40.0150°N 105.2705°W | 5,318 feet (1,621 m) |
| Boulder City‡ | see Boulder | | | |
| Boulder Junction | Boulder neighborhood | 80301 | 40.0167°N 105.2089°W | 5,233 feet (1,595 m) |
| Bulkley | unincorporated community | | | |
| Bunce | former post office | | | |
| Burlington | former post office | | | |
| Canfield | unincorporated community | 80026 | 40.0536°N 105.0747°W | 5,033 feet (1,534 m) |
| Cardinal | unincorporated community | 80466 | 39.9697°N 105.5478°W | 8,704 feet (2,653 m) |
| Caribou | ghost town | 80466 | 39.9808°N 105.5786°W | 9,970 feet (3,039 m) |
| Caribou City | unincorporated community | 80466 | 39.9900°N 105.5128°W | 8,435 feet (2,571 m) |
| Coal Creek CDP (Note: The Coal Creek CDP straddles Jefferson, Boulder, and Gilpin counties.) | census-designated place | 80403 | See also the Coal Creek CDP in Jefferson County. | |
| Coal Park | former post office | | | |
| Copper Rock | former post office | | | |
| Copperdale | unincorporated community | 80403 | 39.9142°N 105.3494°W | 7,986 feet (2,434 m) |
| Coraville | former post office | | | |
| Crescent | unincorporated community | 80403 | 39.9283°N 105.3428°W | 7,454 feet (2,272 m) |
| Crescent Village | unincorporated community | 80403 | 39.9197°N 105.3611°W | 8,018 feet (2,444 m) |
| Crisman | census-designated place | 80302 | 40.0416°N 105.3674°W | 6,591 feet (2,009 m) |
| Davidson | former post office | | | |
| Delphi | former post office | 80302 | | |
| Dominion | Longmont neighborhood | 80501 | 40.1430°N 105.1269°W | 5,000 feet (1,524 m) |
| Downer | former post office | | | |
| Eagle Rock | former post office | | | |
| El Dora | see Eldora | | | |
| El Dorado | see Eldora | | | |
| El Vado | unincorporated community | 80302 | 40.0058°N 105.3464°W | 6,024 feet (1,836 m) |
| Eldora | census-designated place | 80466 | 39.9486°N 105.5639°W | 8,642 feet (2,634 m) |
| Eldorado | see Eldora | | | |
| Eldorado Springs | census-designated place | 80025 | 39.9325°N 105.2769°W | 5,745 feet (1,751 m) |
| Erie (Note: The Town of Erie straddles both Weld and Boulder counties.) | statutory town | 80516, 80514 | 40.0503°N 105.0500°W | 5,026 feet (1,532 m) |
| Eversman | former post office | | | |
| Ferberite | former post office | | | |
| Ferncliff | unincorporated community | 80510 | 40.1908°N 105.5131°W | 8,205 feet (2,501 m) |
| Frances | former post office | | | |
| Glacier Lake | former post office | | | |
| Glendale | census-designated place | 80455 | 40.0869°N 105.3715°W | 7,359 feet (2,243 m) |
| Gold Hill | census-designated place | 80302 | 40.0633°N 105.4096°W | 8,248 feet (2,514 m) |
| Gold Run | unincorporated community | 80302 | 40.0542°N 105.4114°W | 8,127 feet (2,477 m) |
| Goldhill | see Gold Hill | | | |
| Gooding | unincorporated community | 80504 | 40.0736°N 105.0830°W | 4,993 feet (1,522 m) |
| Gorham | see Marshall | | | |
| Grand Island | unincorporated community | 80466 | 39.9708°N 105.6033°W | 9,505 feet (2,897 m) |
| Gresham | former post office | | | |
| Gulch | former post office | | | |
| Gunbarrel | census-designated place | 80301 | 40.0655°N 105.1875°W | 5,210 feet (1,588 m) |
| Happy Valley | see Eldora | | | |
| Hawthorne | see Eldorado Springs | | | |
| Hessie | unincorporated community | 80466 | 39.9550°N 105.6000°W | 9,045 feet (2,757 m) |
| Hidden Lake | census-designated place | 80481 | 40.1100°N 105.4786°W | 8,757 feet (2,669 m) |
| High Mar | Longmont neighborhood | 80011 | | |
| Highland | unincorporated community | 80504 | 40.2389°N 105.0833°W | 5,141 feet (1,567 m) |
| Hygiene | unincorporated community | 80533 | 40.1886°N 105.1808°W | 5,089 feet (1,551 m) |
| Ironsides | former post office | | | |
| Jamestown | statutory town | 80455 | 40.1155°N 105.3886°W | 6,946 feet (2,117 m) |
| Lafayette | home rule city | 80026 | 39.9936°N 105.0897°W | 5,210 feet (1,588 m) |
| Lake Shore Park | unincorporated community | 80302 | 39.9589°N 105.3669°W | 7,605 feet (2,318 m) |
| Lakewood | former post office | | | |
| Langford | see Marshall | | | |
| Lazy Acres | census-designated place | 80302 | 40.0933°N 105.3328°W | 7,028 feet (2,142 m) |
| Left Hand | former post office | | | |
| Leyner | census-designated place | 80026 | 40.0511°N 105.1074°W | 5,033 feet (1,534 m) |
| Liggett | unincorporated community | 80301 | 40.0450°N 105.1339°W | 5,062 feet (1,543 m) |
| Longmont (Note: The City of Longmont straddles both Boulder and Weld counties.) | home rule city | 80501-80504 | 40.1672°N 105.1019°W | 4,980 feet (1,518 m) |
| Louisville | home rule city | 80027 | 39.9778°N 105.1319°W | 5,338 feet (1,627 m) |
| Lyons | statutory town | 80540 | 40.2247°N 105.2714°W | 5,364 feet (1,635 m) |
| Magnolia | unincorporated community | 80466 | 39.9939°N 105.3653°W | 7,195 feet (2,193 m) |
| Maple Grove | unincorporated community | 80026 | 39.9636°N 105.0956°W | 5,240 feet (1,597 m) |
| Marnett | Longmont neighborhood | 80503 | 40.1683°N 105.1339°W | 4,993 feet (1,522 m) |
| Marshall | unincorporated community | 80305 | 39.9555°N 105.2297°W | 5,512 feet (1,680 m) |
| Meeker Park | unincorporated community | 80510 | 40.2339°N 105.5308°W | 8,494 feet (2,589 m) |
| Middle Boulder | see Nederland | | | |
| Miramonte | unincorporated community | 80403 | 39.9305°N 105.3728°W | 7,822 feet (2,384 m) |
| Modoc | former post office | | | |
| Morey | unincorporated community | 80504 | 40.2175°N 105.0928°W | 5,102 feet (1,555 m) |
| Mountain Meadows | census-designated place | 80302 | 40.0239°N 105.3805°W | 7,224 feet (2,202 m) |
| Nederland | statutory town | 80466 | 39.9614°N 105.5108°W | 8,232 feet (2,509 m) |
| Ni Wot | see Niwot | | | |
| Ninemile Corner | Erie neighborhood | 80026 | 40.0153°N 105.1036°W | 5,262 feet (1,604 m) |
| Niwot | census-designated place | 80503-80504; 80544 | 40.1039°N 105.1708°W | 5,095 feet (1,553 m) |
| Noland | unincorporated community | 80503 | 40.2592°N 105.2544°W | 6,027 feet (1,837 m) |
| Orodelfan | former post office | | | |
| Orodell | unincorporated community | 80302 | 40.0150°N 105.3253°W | 5,725 feet (1,745 m) |
| Osborn Avenue | former post office | | | |
| Paragon Estates | census-designated place | 80303 | 39.9802°N 105.1813°W | 5,440 feet (1,658 m) |
| Peaceful Valley | unincorporated community | 80540 | 40.1314°N 105.4978°W | 8,435 feet (2,571 m) |
| Penn | former post office | | | |
| Pine Brook Hill | census-designated place | 80304 | 40.0500°N 105.3147°W | 6,414 feet (1,955 m) |
| Pine Valley | unincorporated community | 80540 | 40.1917°N 105.4831°W | 8,281 feet (2,524 m) |
| Pinecliffe (Note: Pinecliffe, Colorado straddles Gilpin and Boulder counties.) | unincorporated community | 80471 | See also Pinecliffe in Gilpin County. | |
| Pleasant View Ridge | unincorporated community | 80504 | 40.1167°N 105.0555°W | 4,997 feet (1,523 m) |
| Pony Estates | unincorporated community | 80020 | | |
| Primos | former post office | | | |
| Prospect | Longmont neighborhood | 80504 | | |
| Puzzler | former post office | | | |
| Raymond | unincorporated community | 80540 | 40.1550°N 105.4644°W | 7,808 feet (2,380 m) |
| Ridgewood | unincorporated community | 80466 | 39.9658°N 105.4236°W | 8,054 feet (2,455 m) |
| Riverside | unincorporated community | 80540 | 40.1755°N 105.4372°W | 7,444 feet (2,269 m) |
| Rock Creek | Superior neighborhood | 80027 | 39.9361°N 105.1564°W | 5,548 feet (1,691 m) |
| Rockville | former post office | 80455 | | |
| Rowena | unincorporated community | 80455 | 40.0769°N 105.3894°W | 7,201 feet (2,195 m) |
| Saint Ann Highlands | census-designated place | 80466 | 39.9869°N 105.4561°W | 8,255 feet (2,516 m) |
| Salina | unincorporated community | 80302 | 40.0505°N 105.3725°W | 6,601 feet (2,012 m) |
| Seven Hills | census-designated place | 80302 | 40.0264°N 105.3119°W | 5,922 feet (1,805 m) |
| Shelton | former post office | | | |
| Silver Springs | unincorporated community | 80302 | 40.0155°N 105.4544°W | 8,114 feet (2,473 m) |
| Silver Spruce | unincorporated community | 80302 | 40.0047°N 105.3478°W | 6,063 feet (1,848 m) |
| Springdale | unincorporated community | 80302 | 40.1097°N 105.3583°W | 6,565 feet (2,001 m) |
| Sugarloaf | census-designated place | 80302 | 40.0189°N 105.4077°W | 7,841 feet (2,390 m) |
| Summerville | unincorporated community | 80302 | 40.0569°N 105.3944°W | 7,392 feet (2,253 m) |
| Sunnyside | unincorporated community | 80302 | 40.0036°N 105.3817°W | 6,411 feet (1,954 m) |
| Sunset | ghost town | 80302 | 40.0358°N 105.4689°W | 7,743 feet (2,360 m) |
| Sunshine | census-designated place | 80302 | 40.0637°N 105.3696°W | 7,346 feet (2,239 m) |
| Superior (Note: The Town of Superior straddles both Boulder and Jefferson counties.) | statutory town | 80027 | 39.9528°N 105.1686°W | 5,499 feet (1,676 m) |
| Switzerland Park | unincorporated community | 80302 | 40.0014°N 105.4347°W | 7,589 feet (2,313 m) |
| Tabor | Erie neighborhood | 80026 | 40.0514°N 105.0741°W | 5,052 feet (1,540 m) |
| Tall Timber | census-designated place | 80302 | 40.0144°N 105.3517°W | 6,398 feet (1,950 m) |
| Tungsten | ghost town | 80466 | 39.9719°N 105.4761°W | 7,992 feet (2,436 m) |
| Valmont | census-designated place | 80301 | 40.0342°N 105.2065°W | 5,161 feet (1,573 m) |
| Vesuvius | former post office | | | |
| Wallstreet | unincorporated community | 80302 | 40.0389°N 105.3908°W | 6,883 feet (2,098 m) |
| Ward | home rule town | 80481 | 40.0722°N 105.5083°W | 9,144 feet (2,787 m) |
| Ward District | see Ward | | | |
| Wheelman | unincorporated community | 80302 | 40.0036°N 105.3739°W | 6,339 feet (1,932 m) |
| Whispering Pine | unincorporated community | 80466 | 39.9697°N 105.4858°W | 8,392 feet (2,558 m) |
| Whitney | former post office | | | |
| Wondervu | unincorporated community | 80403 | 39.9255°N 105.3950°W | 8,629 feet (2,630 m) |

== City and County of Broomfield ==
Select the OpenStreetMap link at the right to view the location of places in this section.

| Place | Type | ZIP Code | Location | Elevation |
|---|---|---|---|---|
| Aspen Creek | Broomfield neighborhood | 80020 | 39.9453°N 105.0547°W | 5,364 feet (1,635 m) |
| Brandywine | Broomfield neighborhood | 80020 | 39.9236°N 105.0364°W | 5,253 feet (1,601 m) |
| Broadlands | Broomfield neighborhood | 80023 | 39.9506°N 105.0389°W | 5,285 feet (1,611 m) |
| Broadlands West | Broomfield neighborhood | 80023 | 39.9456°N 105.0472°W | 5,322 feet (1,622 m) |
| Broomfield† (Note: The City and County of Broomfield was consolidated on November 15, 2001.) | consolidated city and county | 80020-80023; 80038 | 39.9205°N 105.0867°W | 5,390 feet (1,643 m) |
| Broomfield Heights | Broomfield neighborhood | 80020 | 39.9381°N 105.0753°W | 5,430 feet (1,655 m) |
| Country Estates | Broomfield neighborhood | 80020 | 39.9447°N 105.0703°W | 5,449 feet (1,661 m) |
| Crofton Park | Broomfield neighborhood | 80020 | 39.9231°N 105.0311°W | 5,233 feet (1,595 m) |
| McKay Landing | Broomfield neighborhood | 80023 | 39.9533°N 105.0206°W | 5,266 feet (1,605 m) |
| Mountain View Estates | Broomfield neighborhood | 80023 | | |
| Northmoor | Broomfield neighborhood | 80020 | 39.9397°N 105.0561°W | 5,377 feet (1,639 m) |
| Sunnyslope Estates | Broomfield neighborhood | 80023 | 39.9425°N 105.0400°W | 5,292 feet (1,613 m) |
| The Broadlands | Broomfield neighborhood | 80023 | 39.9511°N 105.0289°W | 5,272 feet (1,607 m) |

== Chaffee County ==
Select the OpenStreetMap link at the right to view the location of places in this section.

| Place | Type | ZIP Code | Location | Elevation |
|---|---|---|---|---|
| Alpine | ghost town | 81236 | 38.7111°N 106.2770°W | 9,268 feet (2,825 m) |
| Americus | unincorporated community | 81211 | 38.9025°N 106.1656°W | 8,183 feet (2,494 m) |
| Antero | former post office | | | |
| Arbourville | former post office | | | |
| Arkansas (Note: On March 28, 1881, Arkansas changed its name to Salida. Salida has served as the seat of Chaffee County, Colorado since 1928.) | see Salida | | | |
| Belleview | unincorporated community | 81201 | 38.5692°N 106.0372°W | 7,215 feet (2,199 m) |
| Brown Cañon | former post office | 81212 | 38.6119°N 106.0600°W | 7,316 feet (2,230 m) |
| Browns Canon | former post office | 81212 | 38.6119°N 106.0600°W | 7,316 feet (2,230 m) |
| Brown's Canyon | former post office | 81212 | 38.6119°N 106.0600°W | 7,316 feet (2,230 m) |
| Buena Vista‡ (Note: Buena Vista served as the seat of Chaffee County, Colorado from 1888 until 1928.) | statutory town | 81211 | 38.8422°N 106.1311°W | 7,959 feet (2,426 m) |
| Calumet | former post office | | | |
| Carmel | former post office | | | |
| Cash Creek | former post office | | | |
| Centerville | unincorporated community | 81236 | 38.7089°N 106.0917°W | 7,851 feet (2,393 m) |
| Chaffee | see Monarch | | | |
| Chalk Creek | see Nathrop | | | |
| Cleora | unincorporated community | 81201 | 38.5133°N 105.9700°W | 7,001 feet (2,134 m) |
| Cochem | former post office | | | |
| Columbus | former post office | | | |
| Conrow | former post office | | | |
| Cottonwood Springs | former post office | | | |
| Divide | former post office | | | |
| Dolomite | former post office | | | |
| Dora | former post office | | | |
| Feathers Ranch | former post office | | | |
| Fisher | former post office | | | |
| Forest City | see Saint Elmo | | | |
| Free Gold | former post office | | | |
| Futurity | unincorporated community | 81201 | 38.7364°N 105.9539°W | 9,764 feet (2,976 m) |
| Garfield | census-designated place | 81201 | 38.5493°N 106.2893°W | 9,518 feet (2,901 m) |
| Granite‡ (Note: In 1868, county voters selected Granite as the new seat of Lake County, Colorado Territory, and after statehood on August 1, 1876, the seat of Lake County, Colorado. On February 8, 1879, the state changed the name of Lake County to Carbonate County for just two days. After two days, the state created Chaffee County, Colorado and designated Granite as the original county seat, serving until 1888.) | unincorporated community | 81228 | 39.0436°N 106.2634°W | 9,058 feet (2,761 m) |
| Hancock | ghost town | 81236 | 38.6397°N 106.3608°W | 11,053 feet (3,369 m) |
| Helena | former post office | | | |
| Heywood | former post office | | | |
| Higgins | former post office | | | |
| Hortense | former post office | | | |
| Iron City | unincorporated community | 81236 | 38.7086°N 106.3381°W | 9,902 feet (3,018 m) |
| Johnson Village | census-designated place | 81211 | 38.8108°N 106.1067°W | 7,851 feet (2,393 m) |
| Kraft | former post office | | | |
| Krain | former post office | | | |
| Mahonville | former post office | | | |
| Maysville | census-designated place | 81201 | 38.5386°N 106.1903°W | 8,232 feet (2,509 m) |
| Mears | former post office | | | |
| Meily | former post office | | | |
| Monarch | unincorporated community | 81227 | | |
| Morley | former post office | | | |
| Mount Princeton | former post office | 81236 | | |
| Mount Princeton Hot Springs | former post office | 81236 | | |
| Murphy's Switch | former post office | | | |
| Nathrop | census-designated place | 81236 | 38.7472°N 106.0756°W | 7,687 feet (2,343 m) |
| Neva | former post office | | | |
| Newett | unincorporated community | 80449 | 38.8667°N 105.9889°W | 9,081 feet (2,768 m) |
| Poncha Springs | statutory town | 81242 | 38.5128°N 106.0772°W | 7,470 feet (2,277 m) |
| Poncho Springs | see Poncha Springs | | | |
| Princeton | unincorporated community | 81211 | 38.9933°N 106.2200°W | 8,638 feet (2,633 m) |
| Riverside | unincorporated community | 81211 | 38.9383°N 106.1839°W | 8,346 feet (2,544 m) |
| Rockdale | unincorporated community | 81211 | 38.9914°N 106.4117°W | 9,990 feet (3,045 m) |
| Romley | ghost town | 81236 | 38.6750°N 106.3700°W | 10,318 feet (3,145 m) |
| Saint Elmo | ghost town | 81236 | 38.7047°N 106.3481°W | 10,007 feet (3,050 m) |
| Salida† (Note: On March 28, 1881, Arkansas changed its name to Salida. Salida has served as the seat of Chaffee County, Colorado since 1928.) | statutory city | 81201, 81227 | 38.5347°N 105.9989°W | 7,083 feet (2,159 m) |
| Shavano | unincorporated community | 81201 | 38.6028°N 106.2903°W | 10,748 feet (3,276 m) |
| Shirley | unincorporated community | 81242 | 38.4244°N 106.1284°W | 8,652 feet (2,637 m) |
| Silverdale | former post office | | | |
| Smeltertown | census-designated place | 81201 | 38.5523°N 106.0084°W | 7,142 feet (2,177 m) |
| South Arkansas | see Poncha Springs | | | |
| Stonewall | unincorporated community | 81201 | 38.6311°N 106.3597°W | 11,263 feet (3,433 m) |
| Swan | unincorporated community | 81236 | 38.6800°N 106.0420°W | 7,461 feet (2,274 m) |
| Sylvanite | former post office | | | |
| Turret | ghost town | 81201 | 38.6403°N 105.9889°W | 8,537 feet (2,602 m) |
| Vicksburg | unincorporated community | 81211 | 38.9992°N 106.3778°W | 9,672 feet (2,948 m) |
| Wild Horse | former post office | | | |
| Winfield | ghost town | 81211 | 38.9847°N 106.4409°W | 10,243 feet (3,122 m) |

== Cheyenne County ==
Select the OpenStreetMap link at the right to view the location of places in this section.

| Place | Type | ZIP Code | Location | Elevation |
|---|---|---|---|---|
| Arapahoe | census-designated place | 80802 | 38.8500°N 102.1821°W | 4,006 feet (1,221 m) |
| Arena | former post office | | | |
| Aroya | unincorporated community | 80862 | 38.8542°N 103.1255°W | 4,580 feet (1,396 m) |
| Chemung | former post office | | | |
| Cheyenne Wells† (Note: Cheyenne Wells has been the seat of Cheyenne County, Colorado since the county was created on March 25, 1889.) | statutory town | 80810 | 38.8214°N 102.3532°W | 4,291 feet (1,308 m) |
| Firstview | unincorporated community | 80810 | 38.8158°N 102.5396°W | 4,577 feet (1,395 m) |
| Fort Big Spring | unincorporated community | 80825 | 38.9333°N 102.8296°W | 4,485 feet (1,367 m) |
| Kit Carson‡ (Note: Kit Carson served as the seat of Greenwood County, Colorado Territory for the four years it existed from February 11, 1870, until February 6, 1874.) | statutory town | 80825 | 38.7611°N 102.7894°W | 4,285 feet (1,306 m) |
| Medill | former post office | | | |
| Mount Pearl | unincorporated community | 80825 | 38.9625°N 102.7894°W | 4,557 feet (1,389 m) |
| Old Wells | unincorporated community | 80810 | 38.9000°N 102.3263°W | 4,183 feet (1,275 m) |
| Pilot | former post office | | | |
| Sorrento | former post office | | | |
| Wild Horse | unincorporated community | 80862 | 38.8258°N 103.0116°W | 4,475 feet (1,364 m) |

== Clear Creek County ==
Select the OpenStreetMap link at the right to view the location of places in this section.

| Place | Type | ZIP Code | Location | Elevation |
|---|---|---|---|---|
| Alice | ghost town | 80452 | 39.8183°N 105.6428°W | 10,092 feet (3,076 m) |
| Argo Mill | Idaho Springs neighborhood | 80452 | 39.7428°N 105.5067°W | 7,503 feet (2,287 m) |
| Bakerville | ghost town | 80476 | 39.6914°N 105.8050°W | 9,787 feet (2,983 m) |
| Belford | former post office | | | |
| Berthoud Falls | unincorporated community | 80438 | 39.7708°N 105.8086°W | 9,793 feet (2,985 m) |
| Black Eagle Mill | unincorporated community | 80542 | 39.7264°N 105.5475°W | 7,759 feet (2,365 m) |
| Blue Valley | census-designated place | 80452 | 39.6997°N 105.4892°W | 9,281 feet (2,829 m) |
| Brook Forest (Note: The Brook Forest CDP straddles both Jefferson and Clear Creek counties.) | census-designated place | 80439 | See also Brook Forest in Jefferson County. | |
| Brookvale | unincorporated community | 80439 | 39.6297°N 105.4192°W | 7,598 feet (2,316 m) |
| Brownsville | former post office | | | |
| Central City (Note: On November 28, 1859, the Provisional Government of the Territory of Jefferson created 12 counties, with Central City as the seat of Mountain County, Jefferson Territory. On November 1, 1861, the new Territory of Colorado created 17 original counties, with Central City as the seat of Gilpin County, Colorado Territory, and since statehood on August 1, 1876, the seat of Gilpin County, Colorado. The City of Central now also extends into Clear Creek County.) | home rule city | 80427 | See also Central City in Gilpin County. | |
| Downieville | unincorporated community | 80436 | 39.7667°N 105.6144°W | 8,031 feet (2,448 m) |
| Downieville-Lawson-Dumont CDP | census-designated place | 80436 | 39.7662°N 105.6126°W | 8,009 feet (2,441 m) |
| Dumont | unincorporated community | 80436 | 39.7647°N 105.6003°W | 7,933 feet (2,418 m) |
| East Argentine | former post office | | | |
| Echo Hills | census-designated place | 80439 | 39.6724°N 105.4155°W | 9,321 feet (2,841 m) |
| Elephant | former post office | | | |
| Empire | statutory town | 80438 | 39.7614°N 105.6844°W | 8,615 feet (2,626 m) |
| Empire City | see Empire | | | |
| Floyd Hill | census-designated place | 80439 | 39.7217°N 105.4313°W | 9,094 feet (2,772 m) |
| Free America | former post office | | | |
| Freeland | unincorporated community | 80452 | 39.7442°N 105.5956°W | 9,209 feet (2,807 m) |
| Georgetown† (Note: In 1867, county voters selected Georgetown as the new seat of Clear Creek County, Colorado Territory, and since statehood on August 1, 1876, the seat of Clear Creek County, Colorado.) | territorial charter municipality | 80444 | 39.7061°N 105.6975°W | 8,520 feet (2,597 m) |
| Gilson Gulch | unincorporated community | 80452 | 39.7617°N 105.5081°W | 8,950 feet (2,728 m) |
| Graymont | unincorporated community | 80476 | 39.6944°N 105.8006°W | 9,764 feet (2,976 m) |
| Hukill | former post office | | | |
| Idaho‡ (Note: On November 1, 1861, the Territory of Colorado created 17 original counties, with Idaho as the original seat of Clear Creek County, Colorado Territory, serving until 1867. On April 7, 1876, Idaho changed its name to Idaho Springs.) | see Idaho Springs | | | |
| Idaho City | see Idaho Springs | | | |
| Idaho Springs | statutory city | 80452 | 39.7425°N 105.5136°W | 7,526 feet (2,294 m) |
| Idahoe | see Idaho Springs | | | |
| Jackson Diggings | see Idaho Springs | | | |
| Lamartine | unincorporated community | 80452 | 39.7294°N 105.6167°W | 10,407 feet (3,172 m) |
| Lawson | unincorporated community | 80436 | 39.7658°N 105.6275°W | 8,107 feet (2,471 m) |
| Lombard | former post office | | | |
| Marshall Park | former post office | | | |
| Mill City | see Dumont | | | |
| Ninetyfour | unincorporated community | 80452 | 39.8275°N 105.6364°W | 10,538 feet (3,212 m) |
| Pine Valley | census-designated place | 80439 | 39.6928°N 105.4107°W | 8,412 feet (2,564 m) |
| Red Elephant | former post office | | | |
| Sacramento City | see Idaho Springs | | | |
| Saint Mary's | census-designated place | 80452 | 39.8163°N 105.6479°W | 10,062 feet (3,067 m) |
| Silver Creek | ghost town | | | |
| Silver Plume | statutory town | 80476 | 39.6961°N 105.7258°W | 9,101 feet (2,774 m) |
| Silverdale | ghost town | 80452 | 39.6917°N 105.6961°W | 9,275 feet (2,827 m) |
| Silverplume | see Silver Plume | | | |
| Spanish Bar | former post office | | | |
| Trout | former post office | | | |
| Upper Bear Creek | census-designated place | 80439 | 39.6319°N 105.4154°W | 7,536 feet (2,297 m) |
| Upper Witter Gulch | census-designated place | 80439 | 39.6602°N 105.4280°W | 8,205 feet (2,501 m) |
| Yankee | unincorporated community | 80452 | 39.8264°N 105.6239°W | 10,951 feet (3,338 m) |
| Yates | see Bakerville | | | |
| Yorktown | former post office | | | |

== Conejos County ==
Select the OpenStreetMap link at the right to view the location of places in this section.

| Place | Type | ZIP Code | Location | Elevation |
|---|---|---|---|---|
| Antonito | statutory town | 81120 | 37.0792°N 106.0086°W | 7,887 feet (2,404 m) |
| Bountiful | unincorporated community | 81140 | 37.2292°N 105.9770°W | 7,644 feet (2,330 m) |
| Broyles | former post office | | | |
| Cañon | unincorporated community | 81120 | 37.0433°N 106.1459°W | 8,189 feet (2,496 m) |
| Capulin | census-designated place | 81124 | 37.2819°N 106.1049°W | 7,805 feet (2,379 m) |
| Cenicero | see Lobatos | | | |
| Centro | unincorporated community | 81140 | 37.2839°N 106.1475°W | 7,887 feet (2,404 m) |
| Cockrell | former post office | | | |
| Conejos† (Note: In 1863, county voters selected Conejos as the seat of Conejos County, Colorado Territory, and since statehood on August 1, 1876, the seat of Conejos County, Colorado. Conejos is the only remaining unincorporated county seat in Colorado.) | census-designated place | 81129 | 37.0873°N 106.0160°W | 7,897 feet (2,407 m) |
| Cumbres | unincorporated community | 81120 | 37.0197°N 106.4478°W | 10,010 feet (3,051 m) |
| Del Rio | former post office | | | |
| Ephraim | former post office | | | |
| Espinosa | unincorporated community | 81120 | 37.1306°N 105.9461°W | 7,746 feet (2,361 m) |
| Espinoza | former post office | 81120 | | |
| Fox Creek | unincorporated community | 81120 | 37.0656°N 106.2014°W | 8,356 feet (2,547 m) |
| Freedom | former post office | 81140 | | |
| Guadaloupe (Note: On November 1, 1861, the Territory of Colorado created 17 original counties, with Guadaloupe as the original seat of Guadaloupe County, Colorado Territory. After only six days, the territory changed the name of the county to Conejos County, and Guadaloupe continued to serve as county seat until 1863.) | see Guadalupe | | | |
| Guadalupe‡ | unincorporated community | 81129 | 37.0953°N 106.0256°W | 7,900 feet (2,408 m) |
| Joya | former post office | 81120 | | |
| La Isla | unincorporated community | | 37.1054°N 105.9272°W | 7,746 feet (2,361 m) |
| La Jara | statutory town | 81140 | 37.2750°N 105.9603°W | 7,605 feet (2,318 m) |
| La Sauses | see Lasauses | | | |
| La Veta Pass | see Veta Pass | | | |
| Lado | former post office | | | |
| Las Mesitas | unincorporated community | 81120 | 37.0645°N 106.1106°W | 8,100 feet (2,469 m) |
| Lasauses | unincorporated community | 81151 | 37.2667°N 105.7464°W | 7,503 feet (2,287 m) |
| Lobatos | unincorporated community | 81120 | 37.0795°N 105.9489°W | 7,792 feet (2,375 m) |
| Los Cerritos | unincorporated community | 81151 | 37.1483°N 105.9109°W | 7,713 feet (2,351 m) |
| Los Sauses | former post office | | | |
| Loyton | former post office | | | |
| Manassa | statutory town | 81141 | 37.1742°N 105.9375°W | 7,687 feet (2,343 m) |
| Mogote | unincorporated community | 81120 | 37.0595°N 106.0922°W | 8,074 feet (2,461 m) |
| Morgan | unincorporated community | 81140 | 37.3278°N 106.0200°W | 7,641 feet (2,329 m) |
| Newcomb | former post office | | | |
| Ortiz | unincorporated community | 81120 | 37.0042°N 106.0442°W | 7,986 feet (2,434 m) |
| Osier | unincorporated community | 81120 | 37.0133°N 106.3364°W | 9,619 feet (2,932 m) |
| Paisaje | unincorporated community | 81120 | 37.0678°N 106.0606°W | 7,999 feet (2,438 m) |
| Pike's Stockade | historic encampment | 81151 | | |
| Platoro | unincorporated community | 81120 | 37.3520°N 106.5328°W | 9,843 feet (3,000 m) |
| Richfield | unincorporated community | 81140 | 37.2778°N 105.9450°W | 7,595 feet (2,315 m) |
| Romeo | statutory town | 81148 | 37.1722°N 105.9853°W | 7,736 feet (2,358 m) |
| San Antonio | unincorporated community | 81120 | 37.0208°N 106.0281°W | 7,943 feet (2,421 m) |
| San Rafael | see Paisaje | | | |
| Sanford | home rule town | 81151 | 37.2583°N 105.9047°W | 7,602 feet (2,317 m) |
| Stunner | former post office | | | |
| Terrace | former post office | | | |
| Vadner | former post office | | | |

== Costilla County ==
Select the OpenStreetMap link at the right to view the location of places in this section.

| Place | Type | ZIP Code | Location | Elevation |
|---|---|---|---|---|
| Bernice | former post office | | | |
| Blanca | statutory town | 81123 | 37.4381°N 105.5158°W | 7,756 feet (2,364 m) |
| Chama | unincorporated community | 81126 | 37.1620°N 105.3783°W | 8,186 feet (2,495 m) |
| Coryell | former post office | | | |
| Costilla‡ (Note: On November 1, 1861, the Territory of Colorado created 17 original counties, with San Miguel as the original seat of Costilla County, Colorado Territory. When its post office opened on November 13, 1862, the village selected the new name Costilla, perhaps in recognition of its new status. In 1863, county voters decided to move the county seat 17 miles (27 km) north to San Luis. In 1869, a U.S. government survey determined that Costilla was actually located in Taos County, New Mexico Territory. It wasn't until October 21, 1872, that the village post office was officially renamed Costilla, New Mexico Territory.) | see Costilla, New Mexico | | | |
| Cristonie | former post office | | | |
| Eastdale | ghost town | 81133 | 37.0286°N 105.6508°W | 7,533 feet (2,296 m) |
| Fir | unincorporated community | 81133 | 37.4853°N 105.1794°W | 9,236 feet (2,815 m) |
| Fort Garland (1858) | historic U.S. Army fort | 81133 | 37.4240°N 105.4323°W | 7,918 feet (2,413 m) |
| Fort Garland | census-designated place | 81133 | 37.4289°N 105.4339°W | 7,943 feet (2,421 m) |
| Fort Massachusetts | historic U.S. Army fort | 81133 | 37.5100°N 105.3912°W | 8,610 feet (2,624 m) |
| Fort Sangre de Cristo | see Spanish Fort | | | |
| Garcia | unincorporated community | 81152 | 37.0042°N 105.5372°W | 7,730 feet (2,356 m) |
| Garland | former post office | | | |
| Garland City | unincorporated community | 81133 | 37.4525°N 105.3422°W | 8,127 feet (2,477 m) |
| Jaroso | unincorporated community | 81138 | 37.0028°N 105.6242°W | 7,579 feet (2,310 m) |
| La Plaza de los Manzanares | see Garcia | | | |
| La Valley | unincorporated community | 81152 | 37.1020°N 105.3478°W | 8,543 feet (2,604 m) |
| Lavalley | former post office | | | |
| Los Fuertes | unincorporated community | 81152 | 37.1345°N 105.3797°W | 8,205 feet (2,501 m) |
| Los Garcias | see Garcia | | | |
| Manzanares | see Garcia | | | |
| Margaret | former post office | | | |
| Mesita | unincorporated community | 81152 | 37.0984°N 105.6020°W | 7,674 feet (2,339 m) |
| Meyer | former post office | | | |
| Norman | former post office | | | |
| Russell | unincorporated community | 81133 | 37.5553°N 105.2878°W | 8,428 feet (2,569 m) |
| San Acacio | census-designated place | 81151 | 37.2086°N 105.5666°W | 7,720 feet (2,353 m) |
| San Luis† (Note: San Luis de la Culebra was settled on April 9, 1851. In 1863, county voters selected San Luis as the new seat of Costilla County, Colorado Territory, and since statehood on August 1, 1876, the seat of Costilla County, Colorado. San Luis is the oldest continuously occupied community in Colorado.) | statutory town | 81152 | 37.2008°N 105.4239°W | 7,982 feet (2,433 m) |
| San Luis de la Culebra | see San Luis | | | |
| San Miguel‡ (Note: On November 1, 1861, the Territory of Colorado created 17 original counties, with San Miguel as the original seat of Costilla County, Colorado Territory. When its post office opened on November 13, 1862, the village selected the new name Costilla, perhaps in recognition of its new status. In 1863, county voters decided to move the county seat 17 miles (27 km) north to San Luis. In 1869, a U.S. government survey determined that Costilla was actually located in Taos County, New Mexico Territory. It wasn't until October 21, 1872, that the village post office was officially renamed Costilla, New Mexico Territory.) | see Costilla, New Mexico | | | |
| San Pablo | unincorporated community | 81152 | 37.1492°N 105.3970°W | 8,094 feet (2,467 m) |
| San Pedro | unincorporated community | 81152 | 37.1597°N 105.4025°W | 8,074 feet (2,461 m) |
| Spanish Fort | historic Spanish Army fort | 81055 | 37.6180°N 105.1931°W | 9,460 feet (2,883 m) |
| Stanley | former post office | | | |
| Underhill | former post office | | | |
| Veta Pass | ghost town | | | |
| Viejo San Acacio | unincorporated community | 81151 | 37.2028°N 105.5083°W | 7,795 feet (2,376 m) |
| Wayside | former post office | | | |

== Crowley County ==
Select the OpenStreetMap link at the right to view the location of places in this section.

| Place | Type | ZIP Code | Location | Elevation |
|---|---|---|---|---|
| Crowley | statutory town | 81033-81034 | 38.1931°N 103.8561°W | 4,354 feet (1,327 m) |
| Hester | former post office | | | |
| King Center | unincorporated community | 81026 | 38.1769°N 103.9075°W | 4,354 feet (1,327 m) |
| Meridith | former post office | 81076 | | |
| Olney | see Olney Springs | | | |
| Olney Springs | statutory town | 81062 | 38.1661°N 103.9447°W | 4,383 feet (1,336 m) |
| Ordway† (Note: Ordway has been the seat of Crowley County, Colorado since the county was created on May 29, 1911.) | statutory town | 81063 | 38.2181°N 103.7561°W | 4,311 feet (1,314 m) |
| Pultney | unincorporated community | 81062 | 38.1622°N 104.0477°W | 4,383 feet (1,336 m) |
| Rocky Ford Auxiliary Army Air Field Number 1 | historic U.S. Army air field | 81067 | 38.1342°N 103.6875°W | 4,360 feet (1,329 m) |
| Sugar City | statutory town | 81076 | 38.2319°N 103.6630°W | 4,304 feet (1,312 m) |
| Wait | see Sugar City | | | |

== Custer County ==
Select the OpenStreetMap link at the right to view the location of places in this section.

| Place | Type | ZIP Code | Location | Elevation |
|---|---|---|---|---|
| Augusta | former post office | | | |
| Bassick | see Querida | | | |
| Blackburn | former post office | | | |
| Blumenau | see Colfax | | | |
| Buzzard's Roost | see Fort Le Duc | | | |
| Camargo | former post office | | | |
| Cleveland | former post office | | | |
| Clifton | see Westcliffe | | | |
| Clinton | former post office | | | |
| Cold Spring | unincorporated community | 81252 | 38.1494°N 105.2425°W | 8,780 feet (2,676 m) |
| Colfax | ghost town | | | |
| Dora | former post office | | | |
| El Cuervo | see Fort Le Duc | | | |
| Fairview | unincorporated community | 81253 | 38.0678°N 105.0992°W | 8,684 feet (2,647 m) |
| Focus | former post office | | | |
| Forestdale | former post office | | | |
| Fort Le Duc | historic trading post | 81253 | | |
| Fort Maurice | see Fort Le Duc | | | |
| Gove | former post office | | | |
| Greenwood | unincorporated community | 81253 | 38.2050°N 105.0969°W | 6,470 feet (1,972 m) |
| Hardscrabble | ghost town | 81226 | | |
| Hickman | former post office | | | |
| Ilse | former post office | | | |
| Keating | former post office | | | |
| McKenzie Junction | unincorporated community | 81253 | 38.1642°N 105.1908°W | 8,360 feet (2,548 m) |
| Millbrook | former post office | | | |
| Neeley | former post office | | | |
| Querida | ghost town | 81252 | 38.1261°N 105.3344°W | 8,986 feet (2,739 m) |
| Rosita‡ (Note: Rosita served as the seat of Custer County, Colorado from 1878 until 1886.) | ghost town | 81252 | 38.0972°N 105.3361°W | 8,809 feet (2,685 m) |
| San Isabel | unincorporated community | 81069 | 37.9875°N 105.0544°W | 8,514 feet (2,595 m) |
| Silver Cliff‡ (Note: Silver Cliff served as the seat of Custer County, Colorado from 1886 until 1928.) | statutory town | 81252 | 38.1353°N 105.4464°W | 7,986 feet (2,434 m) |
| Silver Park | former post office | | | |
| Tanglewood Acres | unincorporated community | 81252 | 38.0939°N 105.5617°W | 8,734 feet (2,662 m) |
| Ula‡ (Note: Ula served as the original seat of Custer County, Colorado since the county was created on March 9, 1877, until 1878.) | ghost town | 81252 | 38.1501°N 105.5019°W | 7,802 feet (2,378 m) |
| Westcliffe† (Note: Westcliffe has served as the seat of Custer County, Colorado since 1928.) | statutory town | 81252 | 38.1347°N 105.4658°W | 7,867 feet (2,398 m) |
| Wetmore | unincorporated community | 81253 | 38.2381°N 105.0847°W | 6,086 feet (1,855 m) |
| Wulstenville | former post office | | | |

== Delta County ==
Select the OpenStreetMap link at the right to view the location of places in this section.

| Place | Type | ZIP Code | Location | Elevation |
|---|---|---|---|---|
| Alda | former post office | | | |
| Austin | unincorporated community | 81410 | 38.7811°N 107.9509°W | 5,043 feet (1,537 m) |
| Bowie | unincorporated community | 81428 | 38.9214°N 107.5401°W | 5,965 feet (1,818 m) |
| Brimstone Corner | unincorporated community | 81413 | 38.9380°N 107.9753°W | 6,486 feet (1,977 m) |
| Broughton | unincorporated community | 81416 | 38.8133°N 108.3270°W | 4,767 feet (1,453 m) |
| Cedaredge | home rule town | 81413 | 38.9016°N 107.9265°W | 6,230 feet (1,899 m) |
| Chipeta | unincorporated community | 81416 | 38.6811°N 108.0090°W | 5,151 feet (1,570 m) |
| Coalby | former post office | | | |
| Coburn | unincorporated community | 81428 | 38.8467°N 107.6359°W | 5,545 feet (1,690 m) |
| Colby | unincorporated community | 81413 | 38.9316°N 107.9753°W | 6,362 feet (1,939 m) |
| Cory | unincorporated community | 81414 | 38.7880°N 107.9873°W | 5,187 feet (1,581 m) |
| Crawford | statutory town | 81415 | 38.7039°N 107.6089°W | 6,558 feet (1,999 m) |
| Delta† (Note: Delta has been the seat of Delta County, Colorado since the county was created on February 11, 1883.) | home rule city | 81416 | 38.7422°N 108.0690°W | 4,961 feet (1,512 m) |
| Dominguez | unincorporated community | 81416 | 38.7972°N 108.3223°W | 4,783 feet (1,458 m) |
| Eckert | unincorporated community | 81418 | 38.8428°N 107.9628°W | 5,568 feet (1,697 m) |
| Escalante | unincorporated community | 81416 | 38.7578°N 108.2617°W | 4,833 feet (1,473 m) |
| Fort Robidoux | see Fort Uncompahgre | | | |
| Fort Uncompahgre | historic trading post | 81416 | | |
| Grand Mesa | unincorporated community | 81413 | 39.0403°N 107.9498°W | 10,148 feet (3,093 m) |
| Hotchkiss | statutory town | 81419 | 38.7997°N 107.7195°W | 5,331 feet (1,625 m) |
| Huff | unincorporated community | 81416 | 38.7569°N 108.2562°W | 4,833 feet (1,473 m) |
| Juanita Junction | unincorporated community | 81428 | 38.9247°N 107.5281°W | 5,922 feet (1,805 m) |
| Keyhole | unincorporated community | 81416 | 38.6930°N 108.3090°W | 5,335 feet (1,626 m) |
| Lazear | census-designated place | 81420 | 38.7800°N 107.7817°W | 5,446 feet (1,660 m) |
| North Delta | unincorporated community | 81416 | 38.7586°N 108.0692°W | 4,938 feet (1,505 m) |
| Orchard City | statutory town | 81410, 81414; 81418 | 38.8283°N 107.9709°W | 5,446 feet (1,660 m) |
| Paonia | statutory town | 81428 | 38.8683°N 107.5920°W | 5,682 feet (1,732 m) |
| Payne | unincorporated community | 81419 | 38.8017°N 107.9020°W | 5,279 feet (1,609 m) |
| Peeples | unincorporated community | 81416 | 38.8219°N 108.3417°W | 4,780 feet (1,457 m) |
| Read | unincorporated community | 81416 | 38.7661°N 107.9762°W | 5,003 feet (1,525 m) |
| Rogers Mesa | unincorporated community | 81419 | 38.7792°N 107.7931°W | 5,427 feet (1,654 m) |
| Roubideau | former post office | | | |
| Saunders | unincorporated community | 81416 | 38.7603°N 108.0101°W | 4,993 feet (1,522 m) |
| Saxton | unincorporated community | 81416 | 38.7683°N 107.9715°W | 5,007 feet (1,526 m) |
| Verne | former post office | | | |
| Welcome | former post office | | | |

== City and County of Denver ==
Select the OpenStreetMap link at the right to view the location of places in this section.

| Place | Type | ZIP Code | Location | Elevation |
|---|---|---|---|---|
| Alamo Placita | historic district | 80218 | 39.7208°N 104.9758°W | 5,269 feet (1,606 m) |
| Alcott | Denver post office | 80212 | 39.7679°N 105.0437°W | 5,432 feet (1,656 m) |
| Argo (Note: As part of its consolidation on December 1, 1902, the new City and County of Denver officially annexed the towns of Argo, Berkeley, Elyria, Globeville, Montclair, and Valverde.) | historic town and post office | 80216 | 39.7842°N 104.9904°W | 5,190 feet (1,582 m) |
| Athmar Park | Denver neighborhood | 80223 | 39.7040°N 105.0110°W | 5,358 feet (1,633 m) |
| Auraria (Note: On December 3, 1859, the Provisional Government of the Territory of Jefferson consolidated the towns of Denver City, Auraria, and Highland into the City of Denver, Auraria, and Highland. Auraria and Highland are now neighborhoods of the City and County of Denver.) | historic gold camp now neighborhood | 80204 | 39.7428°N 105.0052°W | 5,208 feet (1,587 m) |
| Baker | Denver neighborhood | 80204 | 39.7239°N 104.9952°W | 5,252 feet (1,601 m) |
| Barnum (Note: The City of Denver annexed the Town of Barnum on September 3, 1896.) | historic town now neighborhood | 80219 | 39.7181°N 105.0445°W | 5,312 feet (1,619 m) |
| Barnum West | Denver neighborhood | 80219 | 39.7181°N 105.0445°W | 5,280 feet (1,609 m) |
| Bear Valley | Denver neighborhood | 80227 | 39.6628°N 105.0608°W | 5,387 feet (1,642 m) |
| Belcaro | Denver neighborhood | 80209 | 39.7039°N 104.9500°W | 5,359 feet (1,633 m) |
| Berkeley | historic town now neighborhood | 80212 | 39.7766°N 105.0440°W | 5,380 feet (1,640 m) |
| Berkley | see Berkeley | | | |
| Camp Weld | see Fort Weld | | | |
| Capitol Hill | Denver neighborhood | 80218 | 39.7410°N 104.9751°W | 5,283 feet (1,610 m) |
| Central Business District | see Downtown Denver | | | |
| Civic Center | see Denver Civic Center | | | |
| Central Park | Denver neighborhood | 80238, 80010 | 39.7580°N 104.8906°W | 5,312 feet (1,619 m) |
| Chaffee Park | Denver neighborhood | 80221 | 39.7874°N 105.0158°W | 5,319 feet (1,621 m) |
| Cheesman Park | Denver neighborhood | 80206 | 39.7328°N 104.9658°W | 5,365 feet (1,635 m) |
| Cherry Creek | Denver neighborhood | 80206 | 39.7198°N 104.9599°W | 5,303 feet (1,616 m) |
| Cherry Creek Diggings | see Auraria | | | |
| City Park | Denver neighborhood | 80205 | 39.7488°N 104.9504°W | 5,264 feet (1,604 m) |
| City Park West | Denver neighborhood | 80218 | 39.7482°N 104.9678°W | 5,217 feet (1,590 m) |
| Civic Center | see Denver Civic Center | | | |
| Clayton | Denver neighborhood | 80205 | | |
| Cole | Denver neighborhood | 80205 | | |
| Colfax (Note: The City of Denver annexed the Town of Colfax on June 23, 1897.) | historic town | 80204 | 39.7385°N 105.0323°W | 5,308 feet (1,618 m) |
| College View/South Platte | Denver neighborhood | 80223 | | |
| Colorado State Capitol | state government | 80203 | 39.7392321°N 104.9848677°W | 5,280 feet (1,609 m) |
| Congress Park | Denver neighborhood | 80206 | | |
| Coraville | see Auraria | | | |
| Cory-Merrill | Denver neighborhood | 80210 | | |
| Country Club | Denver neighborhood | 80218 | | |
| Denver # (Note: Denver City served as the first capital of the Provisional Government of the Territory of Jefferson from August 24, 1859, until November 13, 1860. On December 3, 1859, the Jefferson Territory granted a charter to the consolidated City of Denver, Auraria, and Highland, still popularly known as Denver City. Denver City served as the first capital of the new Territory of Colorado from February 28, 1861 to July 7, 1862, and served as the first seat of Arapahoe County from November 1, 1861, until November 15, 1902. The Colorado Territory reincorporated the city as the City of Denver City on November 7, 1861. On February 13, 1866, the city shortened its name to the City of Denver. Denver served again as the capital of the Colorado Territory from December 9, 1867, until statehood on August 1, 1876, when Denver became the (first and only) capital of the State of Colorado. The City and County of Denver was consolidated on November 15, 1902, and began official operation on December 1, 1902.) | consolidated city and county | 80201-80299 | 39.7392°N 104.9849°W | 5,280 feet (1,609 m) |
| Denver, Auraria, and Highland ⁂ | see Denver | | | |
| Denver City ⁂ | see Denver | | | |
| Denver Civic Center | Denver neighborhood | 80202 | 39.7392°N 104.9889°W | 5,240 feet (1,597 m) |
| Denver International Airport | Denver airport | 80249 | 39.8617°N 104.6731°W | 5,434 feet (1,656 m) |
| Denver Mills (Note: The Sheffield post office was renamed Denver Mills on January 20, 1892.) | historic post office | 80204 | 39.7444°N 105.0060°W | 5,194 feet (1,583 m) |
| Denver Stockyards | post office | 80216 | 39.7858°N 104.9663°W | 5,173 feet (1,577 m) |
| Denver Union Station | Denver transit station | 80202 | 39.7532°N 105.0002°W | 5,186 feet (1,581 m) |
| Downtown Denver | Denver neighborhood | 80202 | 39.7458°N 104.9930°W | 5,224 feet (1,592 m) |
| East Colfax | Denver neighborhood | 80220 | | |
| Elyria | historic town and post office | 80216 | | |
| Elyria-Swansea | Denver neighborhood | 80216 | | |
| Five Points | Denver neighborhood | 80205 | 39.7547°N 104.9781°W | 5,227 feet (1,593 m) |
| Fort Logan (1889) | historic U.S. Army post | 80236 | | |
| Fort Logan | Denver neighborhood | 80236 | | |
| Fort Sheridan (1887) | see Fort Logan (1889) | | | |
| Fort Weld | historic U.S. Army fort | 80204 | | |
| Gateway/Green Valley Ranch | Denver neighborhood | 80249 | | |
| Globeville | historic town now neighborhood | 80216 | | |
| Goldsmith | Denver neighborhood | 80222 | | |
| Hale | Denver neighborhood | 80220 | | |
| Hampden | Denver neighborhood | 80207 | | |
| Hampden South | Denver neighborhood | 80237 | | |
| Harman (Note: The City of Denver annexed the Town of Harman on February 20, 1895.) | historic town and post office | 80206 | 39.7227°N 104.9533°W | 5,318 feet (1,621 m) |
| Harvey Park | Denver neighborhood | 80219 | | |
| Harvey Park South | Denver neighborhood | 80236 | | |
| Highland | historic gold camp now neighborhood | 80211 | | |
| Highlands (Note: The Highlandtown post office was renamed Highlands on October 15, 1884.) (Note: The City of Denver annexed the Town of Highlands on July 24, 1896.) | historic town and post office | 80211 | | |
| Highlandtown | see Highlands | | | |
| Hilltop | Denver neighborhood | 80220 | | |
| Indian Creek | Denver neighborhood | 80231 | | |
| Jefferson Park | Denver neighborhood | 80211 | | |
| Kennedy | Denver neighborhood | 80014 | | |
| Lincoln Park | Denver neighborhood | 80204 | 39.7378°N 105.0011°W | 5,220 feet (1,591 m) |
| LoDo | see Union Station | | | |
| Lowry | Denver neighborhood | 80230 | 39.7199°N 104.8907°W | 5,390 feet (1,643 m) |
| Lowry Air Force Base | historic U.S. Air Force base | 80230 | 39.7199°N 104.8907°W | 5,390 feet (1,643 m) |
| Mar Lee | Denver neighborhood | 80219 | | |
| Marston | Denver neighborhood | 80123 | | |
| Mexican Diggings | historic gold camp | 80223 | 39.6840°N 105.0006°W | 5,244 feet (1,598 m) |
| Mile High | post office | 80204 | 39.7381°N 104.9936°W | 5,218 feet (1,590 m) |
| Montana City | historic gold camp | 80223 | 39.6740°N 104.9966°W | 5,265 feet (1,605 m) |
| Montbello | Denver neighborhood | 80239 | 39.7936°N 104.8336°W | 5,296 feet (1,614 m) |
| Montclair | historic town now neighborhood | 80220 | 39.7336°N 104.8953°W | 5,342 feet (1,628 m) |
| MountainView Park (Note: The City and County of Denver annexed the Town of MountainView Park on December 31, 1944.) | historic town | 80212 | | |
| North Capitol Hill | Denver neighborhood | 80203 | | |
| North Park Hill | Denver neighborhood | 80207 | | |
| Northeast Park Hill | Denver neighborhood | 80216 | | |
| Overland | Denver neighborhood | 80223 | | |
| Platt Park | Denver neighborhood | 80210 | | |
| Regis | Denver neighborhood | 80212 | | |
| RiNo | see Five Points | | | |
| Rosedale | Denver neighborhood | 80210 | | |
| Ruby Hill | Denver neighborhood | 80223 | 39.6861°N 105.0114°W | 5,345 feet (1,629 m) |
| Sheffield | see Denver Mills | | | |
| Skyland | Denver neighborhood | 80205 | | |
| Sloan Lake | Denver neighborhood | 80212 | | |
| Sloan's Lake | see Sloan Lake | | | |
| South Denver (Note: The City of Denver annexed the Town of South Denver on February 7, 1894.) | historic town | 80209-80210 | 39.6749°N 104.9828°W | 5,319 feet (1,621 m) |
| South Denver | post office | 80209 | 39.7127°N 104.9878°W | 5,257 feet (1,602 m) |
| South Park Hill | Denver neighborhood | 80220 | | |
| Southmoor Park | Denver neighborhood | 80237 | | |
| Speer | Denver neighborhood | 80203 | | |
| Stapleton | see Central Park | | | |
| Stockyards | see Denver Stockyards | | | |
| Sun Valley | Denver neighborhood | 80204 | | |
| Sunnyside | Denver neighborhood | 80211 | 39.7798°N 105.0100°W | 5,273 feet (1,607 m) |
| Swansea | see Elyria-Swansea | | | |
| Union Station | Denver neighborhood | 80202 | 39.7532°N 105.0002°W | 5,186 feet (1,581 m) |
| University | Denver neighborhood | 80210 | | |
| University Hills | Denver neighborhood | 80210 | 39.6653°N 104.9472°W | 5,410 feet (1,649 m) |
| University Park | Denver neighborhood | 80210 | 39.6786°N 104.9694°W | 5,341 feet (1,628 m) |
| Valverde | historic town now neighborhood | 80223 | | |
| Villa Park | Denver neighborhood | 80204 | | |
| Virginia Vale | see Washington Virginia Vale | | | |
| Virginia Village | Denver neighborhood | 80222 | | |
| Washington Park | Denver neighborhood | 80209 | | |
| Washington Park West | Denver neighborhood | 80209 | | |
| Washington Virginia Vale | Denver neighborhood | 80224 | | |
| Wellshire | Denver neighborhood | 80210 | 39.6717°N 104.9689°W | 5,335 feet (1,626 m) |
| West Colfax | Denver neighborhood | 80204 | | |
| West Highland | Denver neighborhood | 80204, 80212 | | |
| Westwood | Denver neighborhood | 80219 | 39.6904°N 105.0419°W | 5,413 feet (1,650 m) |
| Whittier | Denver neighborhood | 80205 | | |
| Windsor | Denver neighborhood | 80247 | | |

== Dolores County ==
Select the OpenStreetMap link at the right to view the location of places in this section.

| Place | Type | ZIP Code | Location | Elevation |
|---|---|---|---|---|
| Alkali | former post office | | | |
| Beaty | former post office | | | |
| Cahone | unincorporated community | 81320 | 37.6589°N 108.8079°W | 6,680 feet (2,036 m) |
| Dove Creek† (Note: Dove Creek has served as the seat of Dolores County, Colorado since 1945.) | statutory town | 81324 | 37.7661°N 108.9059°W | 6,844 feet (2,086 m) |
| Dunton | unincorporated community | 81323 | 37.7728°N 108.0940°W | 8,855 feet (2,699 m) |
| Hermitage | former post office | | | |
| Jual | former post office | | | |
| Lavender | former post office | | | |
| Molding | former post office | | | |
| Northdale | unincorporated community | 81324 | 37.8094°N 109.0168°W | 6,663 feet (2,031 m) |
| Rico‡ (Note: Rico served as the original seat of Dolores County, Colorado since the county was created on March 4, 1881, until 1945.) | home rule town | 81332 | 37.6928°N 108.0304°W | 8,825 feet (2,690 m) |
| Squaw Point | former post office | | | |
| Willow Gulch | former post office | | | |

== Douglas County ==
Select the OpenStreetMap link at the right to view the location of places in this section.

| Place | Type | ZIP Code | Location | Elevation |
|---|---|---|---|---|
| Acequia | unincorporated community | 80125 | 39.5236°N 105.0280°W | 5,554 feet (1,693 m) |
| Acres Green | census-designated place | 80120 | 39.5567°N 104.8961°W | 5,833 feet (1,778 m) |
| Aurora | home rule city | 80010-80019; 80040-80047; 80247 | See also Aurora in Arapahoe County. | |
| Bayou Hills | unincorporated community | 80134 | 39.4263°N 104.7038°W | 6,381 feet (1,945 m) |
| Bear Cañon | former post office | | | |
| Bear Canyon | former post office | | | |
| Bennet Springs | former post office | | | |
| Bethesda | former post office | | | |
| Beverly Hills | unincorporated community | 80108 | 39.4747°N 104.8774°W | 6,398 feet (1,950 m) |
| Blakeland | unincorporated community | 80125 | 39.5597°N 105.0367°W | 5,423 feet (1,653 m) |
| Burning Tree Ranch | unincorporated community | 80116 | 39.3974°N 104.7316°W | 6,381 feet (1,945 m) |
| California Ranch‡ (Note: On November 1, 1861, the Territory of Colorado created 17 original counties, with Frankstown as the original seat of Douglas County, Colorado Territory. In 1864, the county seat and its post office moved 3 miles (5 km) south to the California Ranch stage stop, which took the name Franktown. Franktown served as the county seat until 1874.) | see Franktown | | | |
| Carriage Club | unincorporated community | 80124 | 39.5325°N 104.9011°W | 6,014 feet (1,833 m) |
| Case | former post office | | | |
| Castle Oaks | Castle Rock neighborhood | 80108 | 39.3920°N 104.8107°W | 6,467 feet (1,971 m) |
| Castle Pines | home rule city | 80108 | 39.4717°N 104.8948°W | 6,371 feet (1,942 m) |
| Castle Pines North | see Castle Pines | | | |
| Castle Pines Village | census-designated place | 80108 | 39.4319°N 104.8919°W | 6,138 feet (1,871 m) |
| Castle Rock (1871) | see Douglas | | | |
| Castle Rock† (Note: In 1874, county voters selected Castle Rock as the new seat of Douglas County, Colorado Territory, and since statehood on August 1, 1876, the seat of Douglas County, Colorado.) | home rule town | 80104, 80108; 80109 | 39.3722°N 104.8561°W | 6,217 feet (1,895 m) |
| Castlewood North | unincorporated community | 80116 | 39.3843°N 104.7767°W | 6,247 feet (1,904 m) |
| Cherry | former post office | | | |
| Cherry Creek Highlands | unincorporated community | 80016 | 39.5012°N 104.7865°W | 5,915 feet (1,803 m) |
| Clarke Farms | Parker neighborhood | 80134 | 39.5272°N 104.7881°W | 5,837 feet (1,779 m) |
| Colfax | former post office | | | |
| Cottonwood | unincorporated community | 80134 | 39.5625°N 104.8019°W | 5,751 feet (1,753 m) |
| Country Acres | unincorporated community | 80116 | 39.3881°N 104.6889°W | 6,483 feet (1,976 m) |
| Crestview | unincorporated community | 80138 | 39.4864°N 104.7138°W | 6,237 feet (1,901 m) |
| Daffodil | see Deckers | | | |
| Dakan | ghost town | | | |
| Deckers | unincorporated community | 80135 | 39.2547°N 105.2269°W | 6,398 feet (1,950 m) |
| Douglas | former post office | 80108 | | |
| Founders Village | Castle Rock neighborhood | 80104 | 39.3758°N 104.8086°W | 6,545 feet (1,995 m) |
| Frankstown‡ | ghost town | | | |
| Franktown‡ | census-designated place | 80116 | 39.3914°N 104.7528°W | 6,155 feet (1,876 m) |
| Frosts Ranch | former post office | | | |
| Gateway | unincorporated community | 80130 | 39.5492°N 104.9061°W | 5,925 feet (1,806 m) |
| Glen Grove | former post office | | | |
| Golddale | former post office | | | |
| Grand View Estates | census-designated place | 80134 | 39.5436°N 104.8211°W | 5,820 feet (1,774 m) |
| Greenland | unincorporated community | 80118 | 39.1825°N 104.8553°W | 6,906 feet (2,105 m) |
| Happy Canyon | unincorporated community | 80108 | 39.4350°N 104.8705°W | 6,407 feet (1,953 m) |
| Happy Canyon Ranches | unincorporated community | 80108 | 39.4416°N 104.8639°W | 6,532 feet (1,991 m) |
| Heritage Hills | Lone Tree neighborhood | 80124 | 39.5433°N 104.8789°W | 5,915 feet (1,803 m) |
| Hidden Village | unincorporated community | 80134 | 39.4634°N 104.7074°W | 6,368 feet (1,941 m) |
| Highlands Ranch | census-designated place | 80126, 80129; 80130, 80163 | 39.5539°N 104.9694°W | 5,696 feet (1,736 m) |
| Hill Top | former post office | 80134 | | |
| Hilltop | unincorporated community | 80134 | 39.4517°N 104.6814°W | 6,578 feet (2,005 m) |
| Homestead Hills | unincorporated community | 80138 | 39.5314°N 104.7297°W | 6,165 feet (1,879 m) |
| Huntsville | see Larkspur | | | |
| Inverness | unincorporated community | 80112 | 39.5623°N 104.8629°W | 5,797 feet (1,767 m) |
| Irving | former post office | | | |
| Kellytown | unincorporated community | 80125 | 39.4814°N 104.9936°W | 5,676 feet (1,730 m) |
| Keystone | former post office | | | |
| Keystone Ranch | former post office | | | |
| Kistler Park | unincorporated community | 80126 | 39.5417°N 104.9805°W | 5,735 feet (1,748 m) |
| Larkspur | home rule town | 80118 | 39.2286°N 104.8872°W | 6,726 feet (2,050 m) |
| Littleton | home rule city | 80120-80130; 80160-80166 | See also Littleton in Arapahoe County. | |
| Lone Tree | home rule city | 80124 | 39.5314°N 104.8620°W | 5,997 feet (1,828 m) |
| Louviers | census-designated place | 80131 | 39.4778°N 105.0072°W | 5,669 feet (1,728 m) |
| McArthur Ranch | unincorporated community | 80124 | 39.5173°N 104.9058°W | 6,056 feet (1,846 m) |
| Meridian | census-designated place | 80112 | 39.5517°N 104.8589°W | 5,889 feet (1,795 m) |
| Meridian Village | census-designated place | 80134 | 39.5310°N 104.8261°W | 5,909 feet (1,801 m) |
| Monte Vista Estates | unincorporated community | 80109 | 39.3653°N 104.9214°W | 6,378 feet (1,944 m) |
| Moonridge | unincorporated community | 80135 | 39.3653°N 105.1175°W | 7,484 feet (2,281 m) |
| New Memphis | former post office | 80104 | | |
| Nighthawk | unincorporated community | 80135 | 39.3547°N 105.1694°W | 6,312 feet (1,924 m) |
| Orsa | unincorporated community | 80108 | 39.4222°N 104.9139°W | 5,971 feet (1,820 m) |
| Park Meadows | Lone Tree neighborhood | 80124 | 39.5629°N 104.8763°W | 5,860 feet (1,786 m) |
| Parker | home rule town | 80134, 80138 | 39.5186°N 104.7614°W | 5,869 feet (1,789 m) |
| Pemberton | see Westcreek | | | |
| Perry | former post office | | | |
| Perry Park | census-designated place | 80118 | 39.2567°N 104.9925°W | 6,467 feet (1,971 m) |
| Pine Nook | unincorporated community | 80135 | 39.3842°N 105.0714°W | 7,346 feet (2,239 m) |
| Pine Valley | unincorporated community | 80138 | 39.5256°N 104.7417°W | 6,033 feet (1,839 m) |
| Platte Cañon | former post office | | | |
| Ponderosa East | unincorporated community | 80138 | 39.5461°N 104.6705°W | 6,257 feet (1,907 m) |
| Ponderosa Hills | unincorporated community | 80138 | 39.5447°N 104.7319°W | 6,119 feet (1,865 m) |
| Richlawn Hills | unincorporated community | 80134 | 39.4657°N 104.7826°W | 6,060 feet (1,847 m) |
| Rock Ridge | former post office | | | |
| Rocky Ridge | former post office | | | |
| Roxborough | unincorporated community | 80125 | 39.4693°N 105.0856°W | 5,850 feet (1,783 m) |
| Roxborough Park | census-designated place | 80125 | 39.4739°N 105.0853°W | 5,745 feet (1,751 m) |
| Russellville | former post office | | | |
| Saddlebrook | Parker neighborhood | 80138 | 39.5167°N 104.7339°W | 5,958 feet (1,816 m) |
| Sedalia | census-designated place | 80135 | 39.4369°N 104.9597°W | 5,843 feet (1,781 m) |
| Shamballah-Ashrama | unincorporated community | 80135 | 39.3430°N 105.0333°W | 7,073 feet (2,156 m) |
| Sierra Ridge | census-designated place | 80134 | 39.5314°N 104.8181°W | 5,906 feet (1,800 m) |
| Silver Heights | unincorporated community | 80108 | 39.4180°N 104.8658°W | 6,234 feet (1,900 m) |
| Spring Valley | former post office | | | |
| Spruce | unincorporated community | 80118 | 39.1567°N 104.8783°W | 7,054 feet (2,150 m) |
| Sprucewood | unincorporated community | 80135 | 39.3489°N 105.1208°W | 7,090 feet (2,161 m) |
| Stepping Stone | census-designated place | 80134 | 39.5138°N 104.8261°W | 6,027 feet (1,837 m) |
| Sterling Ranch | census-designated place | 80125 | 39.5043°N 105.0368°W | 5,623 feet (1,714 m) |
| Stonegate | census-designated place | 80134 | 39.5308°N 104.8039°W | 5,866 feet (1,788 m) |
| Strontia | former post office | | | |
| Surrey Ridge | unincorporated community | 80108 | 39.4978°N 104.8826°W | 6,250 feet (1,905 m) |
| The Pinery | census-designated place | 80134 | 39.4553°N 104.7344°W | 6,247 feet (1,904 m) |
| The Village at Castle Pines | see Castle Pines Village | | | |
| Tomah | unincorporated community | 80109 | 39.3019°N 104.8900°W | 6,440 feet (1,963 m) |
| Twin Cedars | unincorporated community | 80135 | 39.3597°N 105.1672°W | 6,207 feet (1,892 m) |
| Tyler | former post office | | | |
| Village Pines | unincorporated community | 80116 | 39.3800°N 104.7239°W | 6,417 feet (1,956 m) |
| Virginia | former post office | | | |
| Vista Pointe | unincorporated community | 80134 | 39.5398°N 104.8342°W | 5,915 feet (1,803 m) |
| Westcreek | census-designated place | 80135 | 39.1525°N 105.1636°W | 7,484 feet (2,281 m) |
| Windy Hills | unincorporated community | 80138 | 39.4856°N 104.6876°W | 6,378 feet (1,944 m) |

== Eagle County ==
Select the OpenStreetMap link at the right to view the location of places in this section.

| Place | Type | ZIP Code | Location | Elevation |
|---|---|---|---|---|
| Arrowhead Village | unincorporated community | 81632 | 39.6344°N 106.5670°W | 7,359 feet (2,243 m) |
| Aspen Junction | see Basalt | | | |
| Astor City | unincorporated community | 81645 | 39.5500°N 106.4089°W | 8,166 feet (2,489 m) |
| Avon | home rule town | 81620 | 39.6314°N 106.5223°W | 7,431 feet (2,265 m) |
| Bachelor Gulch Village | unincorporated community | 81620 | 39.6222°N 106.5437°W | 8,166 feet (2,489 m) |
| Basalt (Note: The Town of Basalt straddles both Eagle and Pitkin counties.) | home rule town | 81621 | 39.3689°N 107.0328°W | 6,611 feet (2,015 m) |
| Beaver Creek Village | unincorporated community | 81620 | 39.6049°N 106.5153°W | 8,097 feet (2,468 m) |
| Belden | ghost town | 81649 | 39.5255°N 106.3861°W | 9,646 feet (2,940 m) |
| Bighorn | ghost town | 81657 | 39.6367°N 106.2972°W | 8,478 feet (2,584 m) |
| Blaine | former post office | | | |
| Bond | unincorporated community | 80423 | 39.8744°N 106.6873°W | 6,739 feet (2,054 m) |
| Burns | unincorporated community | 80426 | 39.8739°N 106.8856°W | 6,493 feet (1,979 m) |
| Camp Hale | historic U.S. Army post | 81645 | 39.4362°N 106.3219°W | 9,229 feet (2,813 m) |
| Carterville | unincorporated community | 81632 | 39.6308°N 106.6461°W | 7,595 feet (2,315 m) |
| Castle (Note: Castle changed its name to Eagle on September 3, 1891. Eagle has served as the seat of Eagle County, Colorado since 1921.) | see Eagle | | | |
| Cleveland | former post office | | | |
| Cooper | former post office | | | |
| Copper Spur | unincorporated community | 80423 | 39.9105°N 106.6884°W | 7,070 feet (2,155 m) |
| Copperton | former post office | | | |
| Coppertown | former post office | 80424 | | |
| Dell | unincorporated community | 80426 | 39.8855°N 106.8564°W | 6,519 feet (1,987 m) |
| Derby | former post office | | | |
| Derby Junction | unincorporated community | 81637 | 39.8689°N 106.9056°W | 6,483 feet (1,976 m) |
| Dotsero | census-designated place | 81637 | 39.6461°N 107.0652°W | 6,145 feet (1,873 m) |
| Dowds Junction | unincorporated community | 81657 | 39.6083°N 106.4478°W | 7,720 feet (2,353 m) |
| Eagle (1880) | former post office | 81631 | | |
| Eagle† | statutory town | 81631 | 39.6553°N 106.8287°W | 6,601 feet (2,012 m) |
| Eagles Nest | unincorporated community | 81657 | 39.6183°N 106.3861°W | 10,328 feet (3,148 m) |
| Edwards | census-designated place | 81632 | 39.6450°N 106.5942°W | 7,221 feet (2,201 m) |
| El Jebel | census-designated place | 81623 | 39.3950°N 107.0903°W | 6,483 feet (1,976 m) |
| Fulford | census-designated place | 81631 | 39.5166°N 106.6575°W | 9,813 feet (2,991 m) |
| Gilman | ghost town | 81645 | 39.5328°N 106.3939°W | 8,950 feet (2,728 m) |
| Gold Park | ghost town | | | |
| Gypsum | home rule town | 81637 | 39.6469°N 106.9517°W | 6,312 feet (1,924 m) |
| Holy Cross | see Holy Cross City | | | |
| Holy Cross City | ghost town | 81645 | 39.4150°N 106.4781°W | 11,427 feet (3,483 m) |
| Hooks | unincorporated community | 81621 | 39.3742°N 107.0887°W | 6,496 feet (1,980 m) |
| Leon | unincorporated community | 81621 | 39.3847°N 107.0992°W | 6,444 feet (1,964 m) |
| McCoy | census-designated place | 80463 | 39.9161°N 106.7256°W | 6,706 feet (2,044 m) |
| Mid Vail | unincorporated community | 81657 | 39.6150°N 106.3678°W | 10,138 feet (3,090 m) |
| Minturn | home rule town | 81645 | 39.5864°N 106.4309°W | 7,861 feet (2,396 m) |
| Mitchell | unincorporated community | 80461 | 39.3917°N 106.3192°W | 9,895 feet (3,016 m) |
| Pando | ghost town | 81649 | 39.4572°N 106.3336°W | 9,203 feet (2,805 m) |
| Peachblow | former post office | | | |
| Red Cliff‡ (Note: Red Cliff served as the original seat of Eagle County, Colorado since the county was created on February 11, 1883, until 1921. Red Cliff changed its name to Redcliff on February 7, 1895; then changed it back to Red Cliff on April 1, 1979.) | statutory town | 81649 | 39.5122°N 106.3681°W | 8,671 feet (2,643 m) |
| Redcliff‡ | see Red Cliff | | | |
| Roudebush | see Mitchell | | | |
| Ruedi (Note: The site of Ruedi is submerged in Ruedi Reservoir.) | ghost town | 81621 | 39.3664°N 106.7981°W | 7,772 feet (2,369 m) |
| Seven Castles | former post office | | | |
| Sheephorn | unincorporated community | 80423 | 39.8922°N 106.4670°W | 7,972 feet (2,430 m) |
| Sherman | former post office | | | |
| Sloss | former post office | | | |
| Squaw Creek | former post office | | | |
| State Bridge | unincorporated community | 80423 | 39.8578°N 106.6498°W | 6,742 feet (2,055 m) |
| Taylor | former post office | | | |
| Tennessee Pass | former post office | | | |
| Tigiwon | ghost town | | | |
| Vail | home rule town | 81657-81658 | 39.6403°N 106.3742°W | 8,189 feet (2,496 m) |
| West Vail | Vail neighborhood | 81657 | 39.6303°N 106.4148°W | 7,936 feet (2,419 m) |
| Wolcott | census-designated place | 81655 | 39.7035°N 106.6800°W | 7,044 feet (2,147 m) |

== El Paso County ==
Select the OpenStreetMap link at the right to view the location of places in this section.

| Place | Type | ZIP Code | Location | Elevation |
|---|---|---|---|---|
| Air Force Academy CDP | census-designated place | 80840-80841 | 38.9985°N 104.8541°W | 6,841 feet (2,085 m) |
| Albano | former post office | | | |
| Alta Vista | unincorporated community | 80808 | 39.0269°N 104.1125°W | 6,414 feet (1,955 m) |
| Amo | former post office | | | |
| Antares | Colorado Springs neighborhood | 80909 | 38.8486°N 104.7789°W | 6,225 feet (1,897 m) |
| Bardeen | former post office | | | |
| Bassetts Mill | former post office | | | |
| Big Sandy | former post office | | | |
| Bijou Basin | ghost town | | | |
| Black Forest | census-designated place | 80106, 80908 | 39.0130°N 104.7008°W | 7,369 feet (2,246 m) |
| Briargate | Colorado Springs neighborhood | 80920 | | |
| Broadmoor | Colorado Springs neighborhood | 80906 | 38.7955°N 104.8414°W | 6,161 feet (1,878 m) |
| Burt | former post office | | | |
| Buttes | Fountain neighborhood | 80817 | 38.5872°N 104.6672°W | 5,335 feet (1,626 m) |
| Cadet | see the United States Air Force Academy | | | |
| Calhan | statutory town | 80808 | 39.0355°N 104.2972°W | 6,535 feet (1,992 m) |
| Camp Carson | see Fort Carson | | | |
| Cascade | unincorporated community | 80809 | 38.8967°N 104.9722°W | 7,379 feet (2,249 m) |
| Cascade-Chipita Park CDP | census-designated place | 80819 | 38.9433°N 105.0023°W | 8,432 feet (2,570 m) |
| Chipita Park | unincorporated community | 80809 | 38.9244°N 105.0066°W | 7,795 feet (2,376 m) |
| Cimarron Hills | census-designated place | 80915 | 38.8586°N 104.6989°W | 6,447 feet (1,965 m) |
| Colorado City ⁂ (Note: On November 28, 1859, the Provisional Government of the Territory of Jefferson created 12 counties, with Colorado City as the seat of El Paso County, Jefferson Territory. On November 1, 1861, the new Territory of Colorado created 17 original counties, with Colorado City as the original seat of El Paso County, Colorado Territory. Colorado City served as the second capital of the Colorado Territory from July 7, 1862, until August 14, 1862. In 1873, county voters moved the county seat to Colorado Springs. On June 10, 1917, the City of Colorado Springs annexed Colorado City.) | territorial capital | 80904 | | |
| Colorado Springs† (Note: In 1873, county voters selected Colorado Springs as the new seat of El Paso County, Colorado Territory, and since statehood on August 1, 1876, the seat of El Paso County, Colorado.) | home rule city | 80901-80997 | 38.8339°N 104.8214°W | 6,010 feet (1,832 m) |
| Cragmor | Colorado Springs neighborhood | 80907, 80918 | | |
| Crows Roost | former post office | | | |
| Curtis | former post office | | | |
| Dragoo | former post office | | | |
| Drennan | former post office | | | |
| Duffield | unincorporated community | 80906 | 38.7422°N 104.9125°W | 9,281 feet (2,829 m) |
| Easton | see Eastonville | | | |
| Eastonville | ghost town | 80831 | 39.0611°N 104.5622°W | 7,234 feet (2,205 m) |
| Edgerton | ghost town | | | |
| El Paso | former post office | 80817 | | |
| Ellicott | census-designated place | 80808 | 38.8256°N 104.3829°W | 5,974 feet (1,821 m) |
| Elsmere | unincorporated community | 80915 | 38.8647°N 104.7105°W | 6,424 feet (1,958 m) |
| Falcon | unincorporated community | 80831 | 38.9330°N 104.6086°W | 6,831 feet (2,082 m) |
| Fort Carson | United States Army post | 80913, 80902 | | |
| Fort Carson CDP | census-designated place | 80913, 80902 | 38.7375°N 104.7889°W | 5,840 feet (1,780 m) |
| Fountain | home rule city | 80817 | 38.6822°N 104.7008°W | 5,545 feet (1,690 m) |
| Franceville | ghost town | | | |
| Franceville Junction | former post office | | | |
| Glen Eyrie | unincorporated community | 80904 | 38.8917°N 104.8844°W | 6,519 feet (1,987 m) |
| Glen Park | unincorporated community | 80133 | 39.1144°N 104.9203°W | 7,297 feet (2,224 m) |
| Gleneagle | census-designated place | 80921 | 39.0453°N 104.8244°W | 6,926 feet (2,111 m) |
| Gleneath | former post office | | | |
| Glenn | former post office | | | |
| Goldrock | former post office | | | |
| Granger | former post office | | | |
| Green | see Green Mountain Falls | | | |
| Green Mountain Falls (Note: The Town of Green Mountain Falls straddles both El Paso and Teller counties.) | statutory town | 80819 | 38.9350°N 105.0169°W | 7,756 feet (2,364 m) |
| Green Settlement | unincorporated community | 80906 | 38.7755°N 104.8925°W | 7,146 feet (2,178 m) |
| Gwillimsville | ghost town | | | |
| Henkel | unincorporated community | 80817 | 38.5200°N 104.6264°W | 5,180 feet (1,579 m) |
| Hibbard | former post office | | | |
| Horace | former post office | | | |
| Husted | ghost town | | | |
| Ivywild | Colorado Springs neighborhood | 80905 | 38.8105°N 104.8353°W | 6,014 feet (1,833 m) |
| Jimmy Camp | see Jimmy's Camp | | | |
| Jimmy's Camp | ghost town | | | |
| Kelker | Colorado Springs neighborhood | 80910 | 38.7958°N 104.7814°W | 5,863 feet (1,787 m) |
| Knob Hill | Colorado Springs neighborhood | 80909 | 38.8400°N 104.7828°W | 6,115 feet (1,864 m) |
| La Foret | unincorporated community | 80908 | 39.0094°N 104.7144°W | 7,231 feet (2,204 m) |
| Lowland | former post office | | | |
| Lytle | ghost town | | | |
| Majors | former post office | | | |
| Manitou | see Manitou Springs | | | |
| Manitou Springs | home rule city | 80829 | 38.8597°N 104.9172°W | 6,358 feet (1,938 m) |
| McFerran | former post office | | | |
| Midway | unincorporated community | 81008 | 38.8425°N 104.9739°W | 8,999 feet (2,743 m) |
| Minnehaha | unincorporated community | 80809 | 38.8494°N 104.9594°W | 8,346 feet (2,544 m) |
| Monument | home rule town | 80132 | 39.0917°N 104.8728°W | 6,975 feet (2,126 m) |
| Mosby | former post office | | | |
| Myers | former post office | | | |
| Newfield | former post office | | | |
| North End | Colorado Springs neighborhood | 80907 | | |
| North Pole | former post office | 80809 | | |
| O.Z. | see Old Zounds | | | |
| Old Colorado City | see Colorado City | | | |
| Old Mountain View | unincorporated community | 80809 | 38.8339°N 104.9914°W | 9,636 feet (2,937 m) |
| Old Zounds | ghost town | | | |
| Pacific | former post office | | | |
| Palmer | see Palmer Lake | | | |
| Palmer Lake | statutory town | 80133 | 39.1222°N 104.9172°W | 7,297 feet (2,224 m) |
| Papeton | Colorado Springs neighborhood | 80907 | 38.8764°N 104.8019°W | 6,184 feet (1,885 m) |
| Peterson Army Air Field | historic U.S. Army air field | 80914 | 38.8128°N 104.7100°W | 6,119 feet (1,865 m) |
| Peterson Space Force Base | U.S. Space Force | 80914 | | |
| Peyton | census-designated place | 80831 | 39.0330°N 104.4904°W | 6,877 feet (2,096 m) |
| Pikeview | Colorado Springs neighborhood | 80919 | 38.9153°N 104.8222°W | 6,247 feet (1,904 m) |
| Pine Crest | Palmer Lake neighborhood | 80133 | 39.1125°N 104.9083°W | 7,103 feet (2,165 m) |
| Ramah | statutory town | 80832 | 39.1217°N 104.1658°W | 6,119 feet (1,865 m) |
| Rock Creek | see Rock Creek Park | | | |
| Rock Creek Park | census-designated place | 80926 | 38.7025°N 104.8391°W | 6,329 feet (1,929 m) |
| Rockrimmon | Colorado Springs neighborhood | 80919 | | |
| Rosa | former post office | | | |
| Roswell | Colorado Springs neighborhood | 80907 | 38.8736°N 104.8194°W | 6,142 feet (1,872 m) |
| Rush | unincorporated community | 80833 | 38.8400°N 104.0922°W | 6,017 feet (1,834 m) |
| Saint Peter | former post office | | | |
| Schriever Space Force Base | U.S. Space Force base | 80912 | | |
| Security | unincorporated community | 80928-80931; 80911, 80925 | 38.7583°N 104.7430°W | 5,758 feet (1,755 m) |
| Security-Widefield CDP | census-designated place | 80928-80931; 80911, 80925 | 38.7486°N 104.7141°W | 5,846 feet (1,782 m) |
| Shirley | unincorporated community | 80938 | 38.9011°N 104.6533°W | 6,677 feet (2,035 m) |
| Signal | former post office | | | |
| Skinners | unincorporated community | 80911 | 38.7689°N 104.7614°W | 5,778 feet (1,761 m) |
| Southwater | former post office | | | |
| Squirrel Creek | former post office | | | |
| Stratmoor | census-designated place | 80906 | 38.7739°N 104.7797°W | 5,787 feet (1,764 m) |
| Stratmoor Hills | unincorporated community | 80906 | 38.7830°N 104.7944°W | 5,948 feet (1,813 m) |
| Stratton Meadows | Colorado Springs neighborhood | 80905 | 38.8033°N 104.8116°W | 5,928 feet (1,807 m) |
| Sublime | former post office | | | |
| Suffolk | former post office | | | |
| Sun View | former post office | | | |
| Surber | former post office | | | |
| Table Rock | ghost town | | | |
| Templeton | Colorado Springs neighborhood | 80918 | | |
| Truckton | unincorporated community | 80864 | 38.7381°N 104.1822°W | 6,024 feet (1,836 m) |
| Turkey Creek | see Lytle | | | |
| U.S. Air Force Academy | see the United States Air Force Academy | | | |
| United States Air Force Academy | U.S. Air Force university | 80840-80841 | 38.9985°N 104.8541°W | 6,841 feet (2,085 m) |
| Waverly | former post office | | | |
| Wayne | former post office | | | |
| Weissport | former post office | | | |
| West End | Colorado Springs neighborhood | 80904 | | |
| Wheatland | former post office | | | |
| Widefield | unincorporated community | 80911 | 38.7333°N 104.7200°W | 5,682 feet (1,732 m) |
| Wigwam | unincorporated community | 80817 | 38.5394°N 104.6355°W | 5,223 feet (1,592 m) |
| Woodmen | former post office | | | |
| Woodmoor | census-designated place | 80132 | 39.1014°N 104.8475°W | 7,244 feet (2,208 m) |
| Yoder | unincorporated community | 80864 | 38.8394°N 104.2219°W | 6,145 feet (1,873 m) |

== Elbert County ==
Select the OpenStreetMap link at the right to view the location of places in this section.

| Place | Type | ZIP Code | Location | Elevation |
|---|---|---|---|---|
| Agate | unincorporated community | 80101 | 39.4617°N 103.9422°W | 5,446 feet (1,660 m) |
| Beck Sand Draw Crossing | unincorporated community | 80835 | 39.0269°N 104.0533°W | 6,211 feet (1,893 m) |
| Benko | former post office | | | |
| Beuck | see Buick | | | |
| Bijou | unincorporated community | 80101 | 39.4225°N 104.1983°W | 6,158 feet (1,877 m) |
| Bland | former post office | | | |
| Buick | ghost town | | | |
| Cedar Point | unincorporated community | 80101 | 39.3453°N 103.8705°W | 5,712 feet (1,741 m) |
| Chenoweth | former post office | | | |
| Cimarron | unincorporated community | 80107 | 39.3736°N 104.6278°W | 6,578 feet (2,005 m) |
| Claud | former post office | | | |
| Clemmons | former post office | | | |
| Clermont | former post office | | | |
| Elbert | census-designated place | 80106 | 39.2189°N 104.5404°W | 6,841 feet (2,085 m) |
| Elizabeth | statutory town | 80107 | 39.3603°N 104.5969°W | 6,476 feet (1,974 m) |
| Fondis | ghost town | 80106 | 39.2158°N 104.3472°W | 6,175 feet (1,882 m) |
| Gebhard | see Agate | | | |
| Godfrey | former post office | | | |
| Gomers Mil | former post office | | | |
| Graceland | former post office | | | |
| Hargisville | former post office | | | |
| Holtwold | former post office | | | |
| Kanza | former post office | | | |
| Keyson | former post office | | | |
| Keysor | former post office | | | |
| Kiowa† (Note: On February 2, 1874, the Territory of Colorado created Elbert County, Colorado Territory, with Kiowa as the county seat, and since statehood on August 1, 1876, the seat of Elbert County, Colorado.) | home rule town | 80117 | 39.3472°N 104.4644°W | 6,378 feet (1,944 m) |
| Kuhns Crossing | unincorporated community | 80835 | | |
| Kutch | unincorporated community | 80832 | 38.9105°N 103.8694°W | 5,673 feet (1,729 m) |
| Laketon | former post office | | | |
| Matheson | census-designated place | 80830 | 39.1717°N 103.9755°W | 5,797 feet (1,767 m) |
| Mattison | see Matheson | | | |
| Melville | former post office | | | |
| Orsburn | former post office | | | |
| Parker Highlands | unincorporated community | 80138 | 39.4714°N 104.6506°W | 6,434 feet (1,961 m) |
| Pawnee Hills | unincorporated community | 80107 | 39.3931°N 104.6383°W | 6,558 feet (1,999 m) |
| Ponderosa Park | census-designated place | 80107 | 39.4083°N 104.6511°W | 6,683 feet (2,037 m) |
| Prairie Trail Ranches | unincorporated community | 80138 | 39.4697°N 104.6322°W | 6,385 feet (1,946 m) |
| River Bend | former post office | | | |
| Rock Butte | former post office | | | |
| Running Creek | former post office | | | |
| Schley | former post office | | | |
| Simla | statutory town | 80835 | 39.1417°N 104.0838°W | 5,978 feet (1,822 m) |
| Wolf Creek | former post office | | | |
| Yoman | former post office | | | |

- Adams
- Alamosa
- Arapahoe
- Archuleta
- Baca
- Bent
- Boulder
- Broomfield
- Chaffee
- Cheyenne
- Clear Creek
- Conejos
- Costilla
- Crowley
- Custer
- Delta
- Denver
- Dolores
- Douglas
- Eagle
- El Paso
- Elbert
- Fremont
- Garfield
- Gilpin
- Grand
- Gunnison
- Hinsdale
- Huerfano
- Jackson
- Jefferson
- Kiowa
- Kit Carson
- La Plata
- Lake
- Larimer
- Las Animas
- Lincoln
- Logan
- Mesa
- Mineral
- Moffat
- Montezuma
- Montrose
- Morgan
- Otero
- Ouray
- Park
- Phillips
- Pitkin
- Prowers
- Pueblo
- Rio Blanco
- Rio Grande
- Routt
- Saguache
- San Juan
- San Miguel
- Sedgwick
- Summit
- Teller
- Washington
- Weld
- Yuma

== See also ==
- Bibliography of Colorado
- Geography of Colorado
- History of Colorado
- Index of Colorado-related articles
- List of Colorado-related lists
  - List of counties in Colorado
  - List of populated places in Colorado
- Outline of Colorado
