= Lavalley =

Lavalley or LaValley is the surname of the following people

- Alexandre Lavalley (1821–1892), French engineer
- Gaston Lavalley (1834–1922), French writer and art historian
- Janet LaValley, American alternative rock singer
- Jim Lavalley (born 1948), Canadian Olympic bobsledder
- Terry R. LaValley (born 1956), American prelate of the Roman Catholic Church

== See also ==
- La Valley, Colorado
- La Valley, Texas
