= Downieville =

Downieville may refer to:

- Downieville, California
- Downieville, Colorado
