= Silver Creek, Colorado =

Silver Creek
- Mining ghost town
- Location within the state of Colorado
- Coordinates: 39°45′19″N 105°37′56″W
- Country: United States
- State: Colorado
- County: Clear Creek County

Government
  - Type: Formerly incorporated town
- Elevation: 9,300 ft (2,800 m)

Population
  - Total: 0
- Time zone: UTC-7 (Mountain (MST))
  - Summer (DST): UTC-6 (MDT)
- ZIP codes: Dumont CO 80436
- Area codes: 303, 720

Silver Creek is a mining ghost town in Clear Creek County, Colorado, United States. The town never had a post office of its own, but received its mail via the Lawson post office. The town is only accessible via unimproved road. Most of the mines were located upstream from the town.

== History ==
Originally known as Daileyville after James Dailey, a local mine manager, the inhabitants soon changed the name to Silver Creek after the local stream that flows into Clear Creek near Lawson. The town was first settled around 1875 when silver ore deposits were discovered in the area; however, it was not officially incorporated until 1885. The mines that supported the town were mostly closed after the 1893 silver crash, but reopened with the demand for metals leading up to and during World War I. The boom did not last, and by 1922 most of the mines were again closed. Among the biggest producers was the Nabob Mine, where a new shaft was sunk in 1906.

The town struggled on for a while, with the last inhabitants leaving during the Depression. By the 1970s only an old mill and a few building foundations made of stone were left.

== In popular culture ==
Silver Creek was the nearest settlement to the home of Annie Wilkes in the 1990 film adaptation of Stephen King's Misery.
