= Arispe =

Arispe may refer to:

- Arispe (moth), a snout moth genus in subfamily Pyralinae
- Arispe, Iowa, United States
- Arispe, Texas, United States
- Arispe, Sonora, Mexico — see Arizpe
- Pedro Arispe (1900–1960), Uruguayan footballer
