= Downieville, Colorado =

Unincorporated community in Colorado, US

- Unincorporated community
- Location of Downieville, Colorado. Downieville (Colorado)
- Coordinates: 39°46′00″N 105°36′52″W
- Country: United States
- State: Colorado
- County: Clear Creek

Government
  - Type: Unincorporated community
  - Body: Clear Creek County
- Elevation: 8,032 ft (2,448 m)
- Time zone: UTC−07:00 (MST)
  - Summer (DST): UTC−06:00 (MDT)
- ZIP code: Dumont 80436
- Area codes: 303/720/983
- GNIS town ID: 2408685
- FIPS code: 08-21390

Downieville is a small unincorporated community situated along Clear Creek in Clear Creek County, Colorado, United States. Downieville is the principal community of the Downieville-Lawson-Dumont, CO Census Designated Place.

== History ==
Downieville has never had its own post office. The Dumont, Colorado, post office (ZIP code 80436) serves the area.

== See also ==
- Front Range Urban Corridor
