= Gaston Lavalley =

French writer, historian and art historian

Gaston Lavalley (29 November 1834 in Vouilly – 1922) was a French writer, historian and art historian. He was a son of the engineer Louis-Auguste Lavalley-Dupéroux (1800–1885) and brother to Georges-Aimar Lavalley (1830–1882), later director of Caen's Musée des Antiquité and writer on religious buildings in the diocese of Bayeux. Gaston studied law before being made chief curator of the town library in Caen in 1870. Specialising in the history of Normandy, he contributed to many local and national journals and wrote many books, of which the main one is Légendes normandes.

== Bibliography ==
- Légendes normandes, 1867
- Après l'auto-da-fé. 1872
- Aurélien, 1863
- Arromanches et ses environs, 1867
- Les Balayeuses, 1871
- Les Carabots, scènes de la Révolution, 1874
- Caen, son histoire et ses monuments, 1877
- Les Compagnies du papeguay, particulièrement à Caen, 1881
- Le Drame du camp de Vaussieux, 1889
- Le Général Nu-Pieds, 1898
- Le Duc d'Aumont et les Cent-jours en Normandie, d'après des documents inédits, 1899
- Le duc d'Aumont et les Cent-Jours en Normandie, 1899
- Le grand Carnot, chansonnier, 1900–1910
- Un chauvin de la science, 1900
- Une émeute originale des mineurs de Littry en 1792, d'après des documents complètement inédits, 1904
- La Censure théâtrale à Caen en l'an VII, 1908
- L'Arme blanche sous la Révolution, étude historique, 1912
- Trois journées de Napoléon à Caen en 1811, et passage de Marie-Louise en 1813, 1913
- Les Duellistes de Caen de l'an IV à 1848 et le bretteur Alexis Dumesnil, 1914
