= Lawson, Colorado =

Unincorporated community in Clear Creek County, CO, USA

- Unincorporated community
- Location within the state of Colorado Location in Clear Creek County and the State of Colorado Lawson, Colorado (the United States)
- Coordinates: 39°45′57″N 105°37′39″W
- Country: United States
- State: Colorado
- County: Clear Creek County
- Elevation: 8,107 ft (2,471 m)
- Time zone: UTC-7 (MST)
  - Summer (DST): UTC-6 (MDT)
- ZIP code: Dumont CO 80436
- Area codes: Both 303 and 720
- GNIS feature ID: 204705

Lawson is a small unincorporated community situated along Clear Creek in Clear Creek County, Colorado, United States. Lawson is a part of the Downieville-Lawson-Dumont census-designated place.

== History ==
A post office called Lawson was established in 1877, and remained in operation until 1966. The community was named for Alexander Lawson, the proprietor of a local inn.

== See also ==
- Denver-Aurora Metropolitan Statistical Area
- Denver-Aurora-Boulder Combined Statistical Area
- Front Range Urban Corridor
- List of cities and towns in Colorado
