= Downieville-Lawson-Dumont, Colorado =

Census-designated place in Clear Creek County, Colorado, United States

Downieville-Lawson-Dumont CDP, Colorado
- Census-designated place
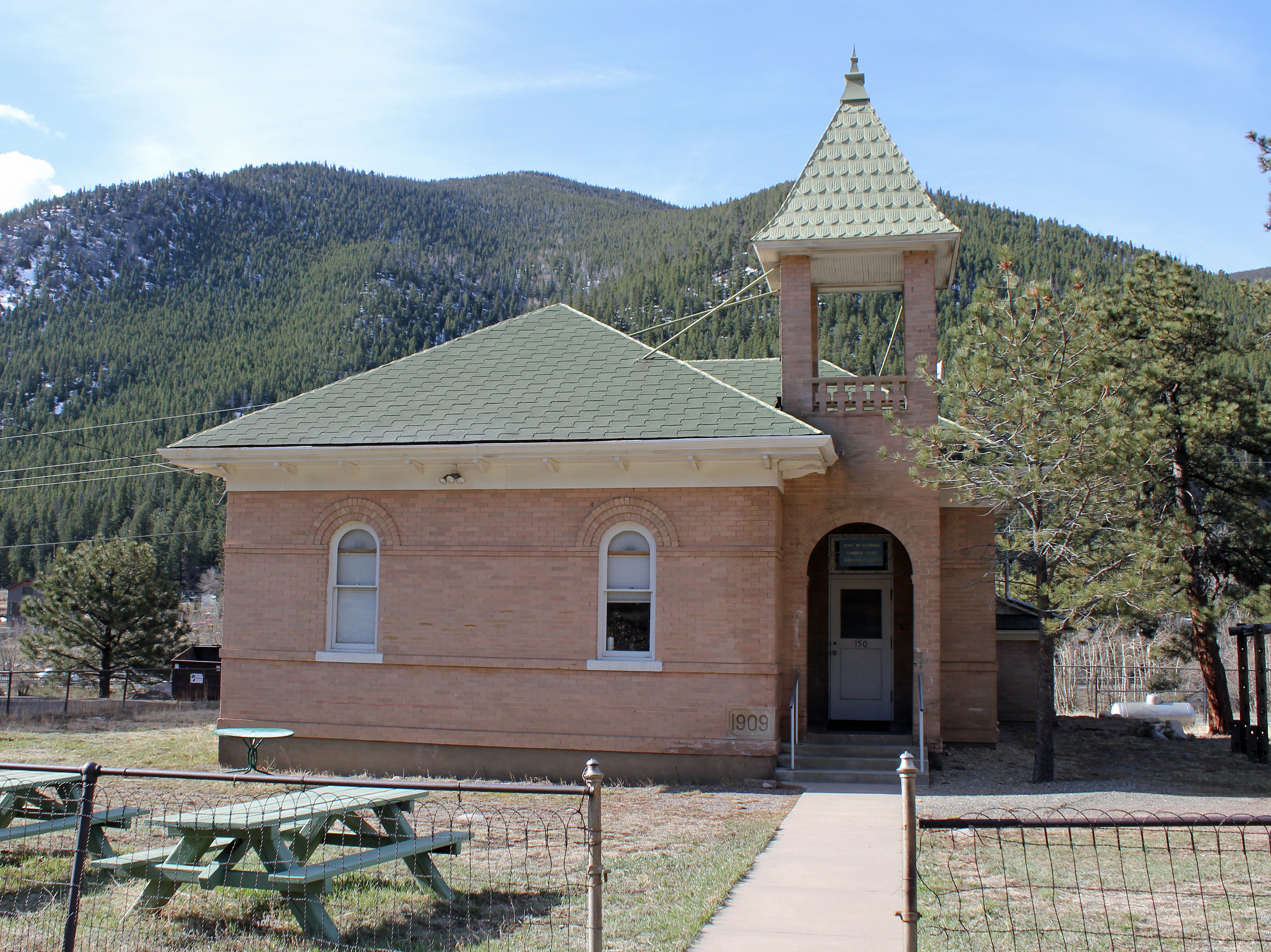
- The Dumont School in Dumont.

- Location of the Downieville-Lawson-Dumont CDP in Clear Creek County, Colorado
- Coordinates: 39°45′54″N 105°37′25″W
- Country: United States
- State: Colorado
- County: Clear Creek

Government
  - Type: Unincorporated community
  - Body: Clear Creek County

Area
  - Total: 0.798 sq mi (2.068 km^{2})
  - Land: 0.778 sq mi (2.014 km^{2})
  - Water: 0.021 sq mi (0.054 km^{2})
- Elevation: 8,009 ft (2,441 m)

Population (2020)
  - Total: 527
  - Density: 678/sq mi (262/km^{2})
- Time zone: UTC−07:00 (MST)
  - Summer (DST): UTC−06:00 (MDT)
- ZIP code: Dumont 80436
- Area codes: 303/720/983
- GNIS CDP ID: 2408685
- FIPS code: 08-21390

Downieville-Lawson-Dumont is a census-designated place (CDP) comprising the unincorporated communities of Downieville, Lawson, and Dumont located in, and governed by, Clear Creek County, Colorado, United States. At the United States Census 2020, the population of the Downieville-Lawson-Dumont CDP was 527. The CDP is a part of the Denver-Aurora-Centennial, CO Metropolitan Statistical Area and the Front Range Urban Corridor. The Dumont post office ZIP code 80436 (post office boxes) serves the area.

== History ==
The Lawson, Colorado, post office operated from June 29, 1877, until August 31, 1966. The Dumont, Colorado, post office opened on May 17, 1880, and now serves the area.

== Geography ==
Downieville, Lawson, and Dumont are located adjacent to one another alongside Interstate 70 in Clear Creek Canyon.

Dumont, Colorado, is the easternmost of the three communities at coordinates 39.7647°N 105.6003°W and the lowest at elevation 7,933 feet (2,418 m).

Downieville, Colorado, is located 0.8 miles (1.3 km) further west at coordinates 39.7667°N 105.6144°W and elevation 8,032 feet (2,448 m).

Lawson, Colorado, is located another 1.4 miles (2.3 km) further west at coordinates 39.7658°N 105.6275°W and elevation 8,107 feet (2,471 m).

At the 2020 United States Census, the Downieville-Lawson-Dumont CDP had an area of 511 acres (2.068 km^{2}), including 13 acres (0.054 km^{2}) of water.

== Demographics ==
The United States Census Bureau initially defined the Downieville-Lawson-Dumont CDP for the United States Census 2000.

Downieville-Lawson-Dumont CDP, Colorado
Year	Pop.	±%
2000	364	—
2010	594	+63.2%
2020	527	−11.3%
Source: United States Census Bureau

== See also ==
- Front Range Urban Corridor
