= La Valley, Colorado =

Unincorporated community in Costilla County, Colorado, US

Coordinates: 37°06′07″N 105°20′52″W

La Valley is an unincorporated community in Costilla County, in the U.S. state of Colorado.

== History ==
A post office called Lavalley was established in 1903, and remained in operation until 1918. The community was so named on account of its location in a valley.
