= Arispe, Texas =

Coordinates: 31°09′04″N 105°16′30″W

Arispe (also known as La Valley is a ghost town in Hudspeth County, Texas. Founded in 1885, it was built around a railroad station house. At its peak in the early 20th century, the community had fifty-seven residents. Now mostly deserted except for a railroad switch, the former town is crossed by Interstate 10.
