= Dumont, Colorado =

Unincorporated community in Colorado, US

- Unincorporated community
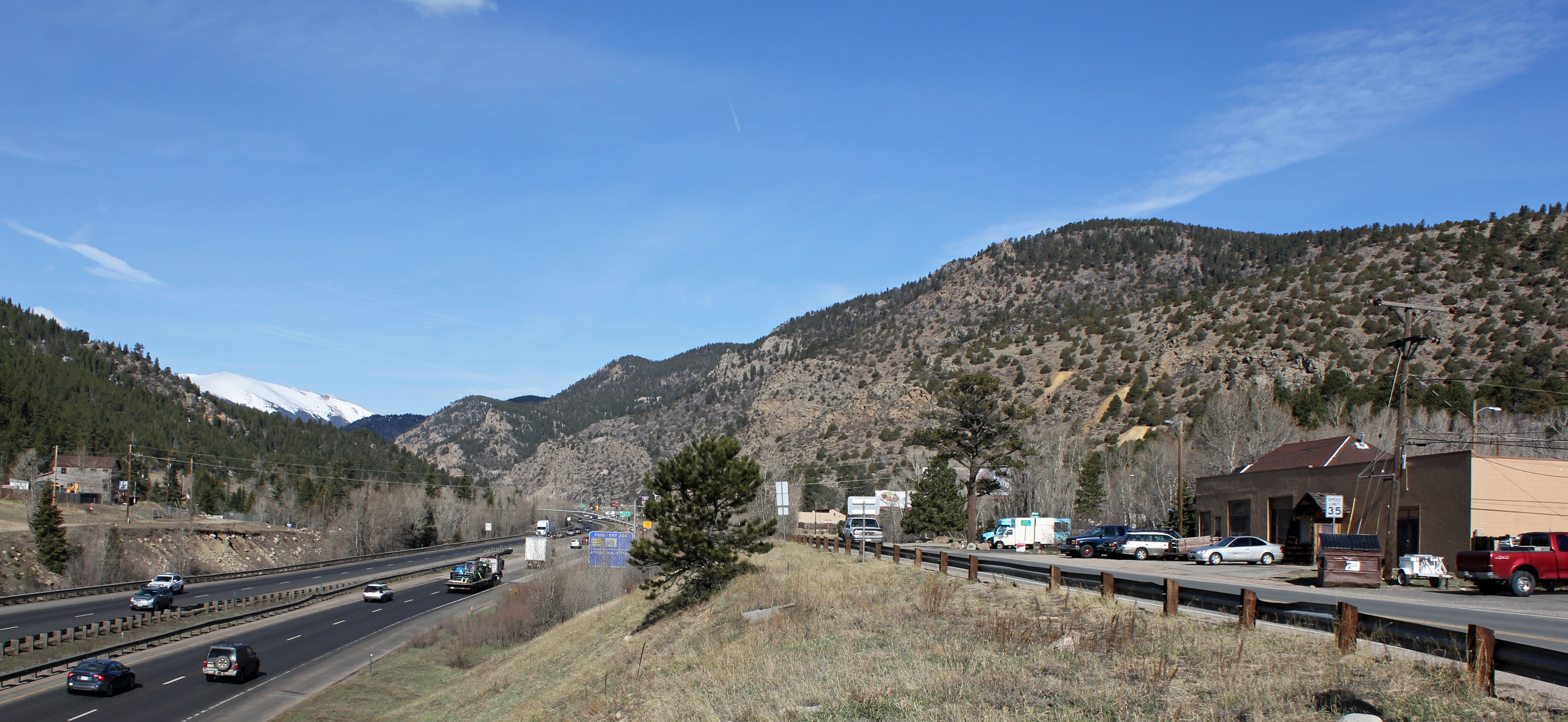
- Dumont looking up towards the Divide, April 2014

- Location of Dumont, Colorado. Dumont (Colorado)
- Coordinates: 39°45′53″N 105°36′01″W
- Country: United States
- State: Colorado
- County: Clear Creek

Government
  - Type: unincorporated community
  - Body: Clear Creek County
- Elevation: 7,933 ft (2,418 m)
- Time zone: UTC−07:00 (MST)
  - Summer (DST): UTC−06:00 (MDT)
- ZIP code: 80436
- Area codes: 303/720/983
- GNIS place ID: 204707
- FIPS code: 08-21390

Dumont is a small unincorporated community and U.S. Post Office situated along Clear Creek in Clear Creek County, Colorado, United States. The Dumont Post Office has the ZIP Code 80436. Dumont is a part of the Downieville-Lawson-Dumont census-designated place.

== History ==
The Dumont, Colorado, post office opened on May 17, 1880. Dumont is named for John M. Dumont, a mine operator.

== Geography ==
Downieville is located in the Downieville-Lawson-Dumont, CO Census Designated Place.

== See also ==
- Front Range Urban Corridor
