= List of ghost towns in Colorado =

The location of the State of Colorado in the United States of America.

The 64 counties of the U.S. State of Colorado

This is a list of some notable ghost towns in the U.S. State of Colorado. A ghost town is a former community that now has no year-round residents or less than 1% of its peak population. Colorado has over 1,500 ghost towns, although visible remains of only about 640 still exist. Due to incomplete records, no exhaustive list can be produced.

== Abandonment ==
Colorado ghost towns were abandoned for a number of reasons:

- Mining towns were abandoned when the mines closed, often due to the devaluation of silver in 1893.
- Mill towns were abandoned when the mining towns they serviced closed.
- Farming towns on the eastern plains were often deserted due to rural depopulation.
- Coal towns were abandoned when the coal (or the need for it) ran out.
- Stage stops were abandoned when the railroad came through.
- Rail stops were deserted when the railroad changed routes or abandoned the spurs.

Others were abandoned for more unusual reasons. Some were resort towns which never brought in enough tourists. At least seven former townsites are now underwater, caused by the creation of reservoirs; a few are covered in mining tailings, as noted below. Of the list below, some involve settlements with visible tangible remains such as structures or cemeteries, while the precise location of others is known only through maps and historic accounts.

== Table ==
This is a sortable table of some of the ghost towns in Colorado. Select the OpenStreetMap link in the box at right to view a map showing the location these towns.

Notable Colorado ghost towns
| Ghost town | Other names | Current county | Location | Elevation | Established | Abandoned | Industry | Status |
|---|---|---|---|---|---|---|---|---|
| Abbeyville | | Gunnison | 38.7775°N 106.4922°W | 9,932 ft 3027 m | 1882 (Note: The year the local post office opened) | 1884 (Note: The year the local post office closed) | Gold camp | Few remains. |
| Aberdeen | | Gunnison | 38.4503°N 106.9869°W | 7,878 ft 2401 m | 1889 (Note: The year the community was founded) | 1912 (Note: The year the community was abandoned) | Granite quarry town | Little remains. |
| Abeyta | San Isidro | Las Animas | 37.0797°N 104.1864°W | 5,725 ft 1745 m | 1914 | 1914 | Farming town | |
| Able | Martin | Bent | 38.0606°N 102.8696°W | 3,783 ft 1153 m | 1924 | | Railroad station | |
| Adelaide | Robinson | Fremont | 38.5600°N 105.0908°W | 6,949 ft 2118 m | 1894 | 1901 | Railroad and gold mining town | Little remains. |
| Adelaide | Park City, Finntown | Lake | 39.2472°N 106.2581°W | 10,834 ft 3302 m | 1876 | 1879 | Silver camp | Little remains. |
| Adena | | Morgan | 40.0083°N 103.8866°W | 4,692 ft 1430 m | 1910 | 1949 | Farming town | School and chapel remain. |
| Alder | Round Hill | Saguache | 38.3694°N 106.0395°W | 8,544 ft 2604 m | 1881 | 1927 | Railroad and mining town | Little remains. |
| Alice | | Clear Creek | 39.8183°N 105.6428°W | 10,092 ft 3076 m | 1898 | 1938 | Gold camp | Summer cabins |
| Alpine | | Chaffee | 38.7111°N 106.2770°W | 9,269 ft 2825 m | 1874 | 1904 | Mining town | Some residents remain. |
| Alta | | San Miguel | 37.8864°N 107.8528°W | 11,060 ft 3371 m | 1877 | 1948 | Mining town | Some structures remain. |
| Altman | | Teller | 38.7361°N 105.1339°W | 10,630 ft 3240 m | 1894 | 1911 | Mining town | Some structures remain. |
| Amache | Granada War Relocation Center | Prowers | 38.0496°N 102.3286°W | 3,602 ft 1098 m | 1942 (Note: The Granada War Relocation Center opened on August 27, 1942.) | 1945 (Note: The Granada War Relocation Center closed on October 15, 1945.) | Internment camp | National Historic Site |
| American City | | Gilpin | 39.8725°N 105.5872°W | 10,633 ft 3241 m | | | | |
| Ames | | San Miguel | 37.8647°N 107.8823°W | 8,721 ft 2658 m | 1880 | 1922 | Ames Hydroelectric Generating Plant | Power plant still in operation. |
| Anaconda | | Teller | 38.7319°N 105.1631°W | 9,498 ft 2895 m | 1893 | 1917 | Gold mining town | |
| Animas City | Animas | La Plata | 37.3017°N 107.8713°W | 6,560 ft 1999 m | 1877 | 1900 | Silver camp | Animas City Park |
| Animas Forks (Note: Located at an elevation of 11,185 feet (3,409 m), the Animas Forks, Colorado Territory post office (became Animas Forks, Colorado on August 1, 1876) was the highest in the United States from February 8, 1875 to February 9, 1876 and again from September 25 to October 15, 1879.) | | San Juan | 37.9311°N 107.5714°W | 11,185 ft 3409 m | 1873 | 1915 | Silver mining town | Some structures remain. |
| Antero Junction | | Park | 38.9233°N 105.9653°W | 9,187 ft 2800 m | 1892 | | Ranching town | Some structures remain. |
| Apex | | Gilpin | 39.8656°N 105.5702°W | 9,846 ft 3001 m | 1894 | 1932 | Gold mining town | Some structures remain. |
| Arapahoe City (Note: On November 28, 1859, the Provisional Government of the Territory of Jefferson created 12 counties, with Arapahoe City as the first seat of Jefferson County, Jefferson Territory. On January 17, 1860, Arapahoe City shortened its name to Arapahoe. On November 6, 1860, the Jefferson Territory moved the seat of Jefferson County to Golden City.) | Arapahoe | Jefferson | 39.7750°N 105.1783°W | 5,585 ft 1702 m | 1858 | 1867 | Placer gold camp | Historical marker near Golden |
| Arastra (Note: Located at an elevation of 12,230 feet (3,728 m), Arastra, Colorado was the highest elevation town to ever have a United States post office.) | Arrastra, Silver Lake | San Juan | 37.7928°N 107.6070°W | 12,230 ft 3728 m | 1890 | 1919 | Mining town | |
| Arrow | | Grand | | | 1905 | 1915 | Railroad town | Little remains. |
| Ashcroft | Castle Forks City, Chloride | Pitkin | 39.0536°N 106.7998°W | 9,521 ft 2902 m | 1880 | 1912 | Silver mining town | National Register Historic Place |
| Astor City | | Eagle | 39.5500°N 106.4089°W | 8,166 ft 2489 m | | | | |
| Auraria (Note: Auraria is now a part of the City and County of Denver.) | | Denver | 39.7428°N 105.0052°W | 5,206 ft 1587 m | 1858 (Note: Auraria was organized on November 6, 1858.) | 1859 (Note: On December 3, 1859, the Provisional Government of the Territory of Jefferson consolidated the towns of Denver City, Auraria, and Highland into the City of Denver, Auraria, and Highland. Auraria and Highland are now neighborhoods of the City and County of Denver.) | Placer gold camp | Historical park and Denver neighborhood |
| Autobees Plaza (Note: On November 1, 1861, the Territory of Colorado created 17 original counties, with Autobees Plaza as the original seat of Huerfano County, Colorado Territory, serving until 1868. Autobees Plaza is now located in Pueblo County.) | Autobees | Pueblo | 38.2100°N 104.2872°W | 4,494 ft 1370 m | 1853 | 1882 | Farming village | Little remains. |
| Axial | | Moffat | 40.2853°N 107.7920°W | 6,454 ft 1967 m | 1883 | 1958 | Coal mining town | |
| Bachelor | Teller, Bachelor City | Mineral | | | 1892 | 1912 | Silver mining town | Little remains. |
| Badito (Note: On September 12, 1865, Little Orphan changed its name to Badito. Badito served as the seat of Huerfano County, Colorado Territory from 1868 until 1874.) | Little Orphan | Huerfano | 37.7272°N 105.0142°W | 6,431 ft 1960 m | 1865 | 1910 | Ranching town and trail stop | Ruins remain. |
| Bakerville | | Clear Creek | 39.6914°N 105.8050°W | 9,787 ft 2983 m | 1865 | | Silver camp | Foundations remain. |
| Baldwin | | Gunnison | 38.7639°N 107.0478°W | 8,767 ft 2672 m | 1909 | 1948 | Coal mining town | Some structures remain. |
| Baltimore | | Gilpin | 39.9033°N 105.5744°W | 9,804 ft 2988 m | 1896 | 1904 | | |
| Bear River | | Routt | 40.4839°N 107.1173°W | 6,423 ft 1958 m | 1914 | 1940 | | |
| Belden | | Eagle | 39.5255°N 106.3861°W | 9,646 ft 2940 m | | | Mining town | Little remains. |
| Bent's Old Fort | Old Fort Bent | Otero | 38.0406°N 103.4294°W | 4,005 ft 1221 m | 1833 (Note: Bent's Old Fort was built in 1833.) | 1849 (Note: Bent's Old Fort was destroyed in 1849.) | Trading post | National Historic Site |
| Berwind | | Las Animas | 37.3084°N 104.6183°W | 6,541 ft 1994 m | 1888 | 1931 | Coal company town | Many structures remain. |
| Beshoar | | Las Animas | 37.2181°N 104.4066°W | 5,922 ft 1805 m | 1901 | 1903 | Farming town | |
| Bijou Basin | | El Paso | 39.1356°N 104.4569°W | 6,398 ft 1950 m | 1869 | 1907 | Ranching town and railroad station | Little remains. |
| Bloom | Iron Spring | Otero | 37.6875°N 103.9566°W | 4,800 ft 1463 m | 1899 | 1938 | Farming town | |
| Boggsville (Note: Boggsville was the last home of Kit Carson from 1867 until his death in 1868. Boggsville served as the seat of Bent County, Colorado Territory from 1870 until 1872.) | | Bent | 38.0417°N 103.2127°W | 3,914 ft 1193 m | 1866 | 1975 | Stage stop and farming town | National Register Historic District |
| Bonanza (Note: The residents of Bonanza City reactivated the Town of Bonanza.) | Bonanza City | Saguache | 38.2947°N 106.1422°W | 9,479 ft 2889 m | 1880 | 1938 | Silver mining town | Town government reactivated |
| Boston | | Baca | 37.2636°N 102.3776°W | 4,072 ft 1241 m | 1887 | 1893 | Ranching town | Some structures remain. |
| Bowen | Aylmer | Las Animas | | | 1900 | 1929 | Coal mining town | |
| Bowerman | | Gunnison | | | 1903 | 1910 | Gold mining town | Some structures remain. |
| Brodhead | | Las Animas | 37.4108°N 104.6764°W | 6,519 ft 1987 m | 1902 | 1939 | Coal mining town | Little remains. |
| Brookfield | | Baca | 37.5939°N 102.8421°W | 4,570 ft 1393 m | 1887 | 1902 | | |
| Brumley | | Lake | 39.0894°N 106.5428°W | 10,606 ft 3233 m | | | | |
| Buckingham | | Weld | 40.6214°N 103.9777°W | 4,944 ft 1507 m | 1888 | 1966 | Ranching town | Some structures remain. |
| Buckskin Joe (Note: On January 7, 1862, county voters selected Laurette as the new seat of Park County, Colorado Territory. On December 21, 1865, Laurette changed its name to Buckskin, commonly known as Buckskin Joe. Buckskin Joe served as county seat until November 7, 1867.) | Laurette, Buckskin | Park | 38.4764°N 105.3269°W | 10,761 ft 3280 m | 1861 | 1873 | Gold camp | Buildings removed. |
| Buick | Beuck | Elbert | | | 1916 | 1925 | Railroad town | |
| Caddoa | | Bent | 38.0478°N 102.9660°W | 3,881 ft 1183 m | 1881 | 1958 | Farming town | Some structures remain. |
| Calcite | | Fremont | 38.4361°N 105.8872°W | 7,601 ft 2317 m | 1903 | 1930 | Coal company town | Some structures remain. |
| California Ranch (Note: On November 1, 1861, the Territory of Colorado created 17 original counties, with Frankstown as the original seat of Douglas County, Colorado Territory. In 1864, the county seat and its post office moved 3 miles (5 km) south to the California Ranch stage stop, which took the name Franktown.) (Note: California Ranch is now a part of the Franktown CDP. The Franktown CDP had 409 residents at the 2020 United States census.) | Franktown | Douglas | 39.3892°N 104.7526°W | 6,139 ft 1871 m | 1861 | 1874 (Note: In 1874, the Douglas County seat was moved from Franktown (previously California Ranch) to the new railroad town of Castle Rock.) | Stage stop | Historic marker at Franktown |
| Calumet | | Huerfano | 37.6928°N 104.8597°W | 6,391 ft 1948 m | 1904 | | Coal mining town | Structures remain. |
| Cameo | | Mesa | 39.1486°N 108.3209°W | 4,787 ft 1459 m | 1907 | 1969 | Coal mining town | Little remains. |
| Camp Hale | | Eagle | 39.4430°N 106.3228°W | 9,238 ft 2816 m | 1942 (Note: Camp Hale was opened in 1942.) | 1945 (Note: Camp Hale was demolished in 1945.) | U.S. Army mountain training camp | National Monument |
| Campbelltown | | Gunnison | 38.6122°N 106.5653°W | 10,501 ft 3201 m | | | | |
| Capers Spur | | Pueblo | 37.9093°N 104.7072°W | 5,734 ft 1748 m | | | | |
| Capitol City | Galena City | Hinsdale | 38.0072°N 107.4667°W | 9,711 ft 2960 m | 1877 | 1920 | Silver mining town | Structures remain. |
| Carbonate (Note: Carbonate served as the original seat of Garfield County, Colorado for several months after the county was created on February 10, 1883.) (Note: On November 4, 2014, the property owners of Carbonate, Colorado voted to reactivate the town government despite having no year-round residents since the 1890 United States census.) | | Garfield | 39.7430°N 107.3467°W | 10,926 ft 3330 m | 1879 | 1886 | Silver camp | Town government reactivated |
| Cardinal | | Boulder | 39.9697°N 105.5478°W | 8,704 ft 2653 m | 1905 | 1919 | | |
| Caribou (Note: The Caribou Ranch recording studios were located near the ghost town of Caribou.) | | Boulder | 39.9808°N 105.5786°W | 9,971 ft 3039 m | 1871 | 1917 | Silver mining town | Some structures remain. |
| Carpenter | | Mesa | 39.1944°N 108.4733°W | 5,808 ft 1770 m | 1890 | 1925 | Coal mining town | Little remains. |
| Carrizo | Carriso | Baca | | | 1887 | 1916 | Ranching town | |
| Carson (Note: Located at an elevation of 11,574 feet (3,528 m), the Carson, Colorado post office was the highest in the United States from September 16, 1889 to June 14, 1895.) | | Hinsdale | 37.8691°N 107.3623°W | 11,574 ft 3528 m | 1889 | 1903 | Mining town | Many structures remain. |
| Chandler | | Fremont | 38.3731°N 105.2005°W | 5,738 ft 1749 m | 1890 | 1942 | Coal company town | |
| Chattanooga | | San Juan | 37.8736°N 107.7253°W | 10,263 ft 3128 m | 1883 | 1894 | Mining camp | Some structures remain. |
| Chihuahua | | Summit | | | 1880 | 1892 | Mining camp | |
| Chimney Rock | | Archuleta | 37.2284°N 107.3478°W | 6,578 ft 2005 m | 1950 | 1967 | | |
| Chivington (Note: Chivington was named for the Reverend John Milton Chivington, a hero of the Battle of Glorieta Pass and the perpetrator of the Sand Creek Massacre.) | | Kiowa | 38.4364°N 102.5435°W | 3,891 ft 1186 m | 1887 | 1991 | Ranching town | Many structures remain. |
| Clarkville | | Yuma | 40.3950°N 102.6260°W | 4,016 ft 1224 m | 1933 | 1954 | Farming town | |
| Climax (Note: Located at Tennessee Pass at an elevation of 11,342 feet (3,457 m), the Climax station on the Denver, South Park and Pacific Railroad was the highest railroad station in North America from its construction in 1884 until 1904 and again from 1928 until it was removed in 1937.) (Note: Located at an elevation of 11,342 feet (3,457 m), the Climax, Colorado post office was the highest in the United States from March 31, 1919 to January 4, 1974.) | | Lake | 39.3689°N 106.1836°W | 11,342 ft 3457 m | 1887 | 1962 (Note: The year the town site was demolished) | Railroad and mining town | Removed for Climax molybdenum mine |
| Coalmont | | Jackson | 40.5625°N 106.4445°W | 8,216 ft 2504 m | 1911 | 1983 | Coal mining town | Structures remain. |
| Colfax | | Custer | | | 1870 | 1879 | Communal farming town | |
| Columbine | | Routt | 40.8541°N 106.9659°W | 8,701 ft 2652 m | 1896 | 1867 | Gold mining town | National Register Historic District |
| Corona (Note: Located on Rollins Pass at an elevation of 11,723 feet (3,573 m), Corona was the highest railroad station in North America.) | | Grand | 39.9344°N 105.6853°W | 11,723 ft 3573 m | 1904 | 1928 | Railroad station with snowshed and hotel | Foundations remain. |
| Cross Mountain | | Moffat | | | 1919 | 1943 | | |
| Crystal | Crystal City | Gunnison | 39.0592°N 107.1012°W | 8,951 ft 2728 m | 1881 | 1917 | Mining town | Structures remain. |
| Dakan | | Douglas | | | 1896 | 1898 | Mining camp | Nothing remains. |
| Dallas | Dallas City | Ouray | 38.1833°N 107.7448°W | 6,923 ft 2110 m | 1880 | 1899 | Stage stop and railroad station | Little remains. |
| Dayton (Note: Dayton served as the seat of Lake County, Colorado Territory from 1866 until 1868.) (Note: The site of Dayton is now in the Twin Lakes CDP. The Twin Lakes CDP had 204 residents at the 2020 United States census.) | | Lake | 39.0828°N 106.3820°W | 9,232 ft 2814 m | 1866 | 1868 | Gold camp | Site in Twin Lakes CDP |
| De Nova | Dillingham | Washington | 39.8589°N 102.9733°W | 4,504 ft 1373 m | 1911 | 1953 | | |
| Dearfield (Note: Dearfield, Colorado was an African American agricultural community founded by Oliver Toussaint Jackson in 1910.) | | Weld | 40.2905°N 104.2594°W | 4,498 ft 1371 m | 1910 (Note: The year the community was platted) | 1948 (Note: Dearfield was never granted a post office.) | African American farming community | National Register Historic District |
| Decatur | | Summit | | | 1879 | 1885 | Mining camp | |
| Delagua | | Las Animas | 37.3400°N 104.6630°W | 6,686 ft 2038 m | 1903 | 1954 | Coal company town | |
| Delcarbon | | Huerfano | 37.7125°N 104.8769°W | 6,342 ft 1933 m | 1915 | 1953 | Coal mining town | |
| Dudley | | Park | 39.2969°N 106.0717°W | 10,501 ft 3201 m | 1872 | 1880 | | |
| Duncan | | Saguache | 37.8742°N 105.6145°W | 8,107 ft 2471 m | 1874 | 1900 | Gold camp | Duncan Cabin preserved |
| Dutchtown | | Grand | 40.4378°N 105.8817°W | 10,755 ft 3278 m | 1879 | 1884 | Silver camp | Site in Rocky Mountain National Park |
| Dyersville | | Summit | 39.4205°N 105.9839°W | 10,880 ft 3316 m | 1881 | 1908 | Mining town | Some frames remain. |
| Eastdale | | Costilla | 37.0286°N 105.6508°W | 7,533 ft 2296 m | 1890 | 1909 | Farming town | |
| Eastonville | Easton | El Paso | 39.0611°N 104.5622°W | 7,235 ft 2205 m | 1872 | 1932 | Railroad and farming town | Some structures remain. |
| Edgerton | | El Paso | 38.9606°N 104.8359°W | 6,398 ft 1950 m | 1870 | 1902 | Railroad town | |
| Eldora (Note: Eldora is now a part of the Eldora CDP. The Eldora CDP had 140 residents at the 2020 United States census.) | Happy Valley, El Dorado | Boulder | 39.9486°N 105.5639°W | 8,642 ft 2634 m | 1897 | 1977 | Mining town | National Register Historic District |
| Elkton | | Gunnison | 38.9636°N 107.0334°W | 10,453 ft 3186 m | 1881 | 1882 | Mining camp | Many structures remain. |
| Elkton | | Teller | 38.7222°N 105.1505°W | 9,971 ft 3039 m | 1895 | 1926 | Gold mining town | Some structures remain. |
| Eureka | | San Juan | 37.8797°N 107.5651°W | 9,863 ft 3006 m | 1873 | 1942 | Gold mining town | Some structures remain. |
| Floresta | | Gunnison | 38.8419°N 107.1228°W | 9,879 ft 3011 m | 1897 | 1919 | Coal mining town | Little remains. |
| Fondis | | Elbert | 39.2158°N 104.3472°W | 6,175 ft 1882 m | 1895 | 1954 | Ranching town | |
| Forbes | | Las Animas | 37.2600°N 104.5647°W | 6,505 ft 1983 m | 1889 | 1929 | | |
| Fort Julesburg | | Sedgwick | 40.9430°N 102.3582°W | 3,510 ft 1070 m | | | Trading post | |
| Fort Saint Vrain | Saint Vrain | Weld | 40.2789°N 104.8550°W | 4,763 ft 1452 m | 1837 | 1849 | Trading post | monument |
| Fort Sedgwick | Camp Rankin; Fort Rankin | Sedgwick | 40.9430°N 102.3805°W | 3,543 ft 1080 m | 1866 | 1869 | U.S. Army post | |
| Fort Vasquez | | Weld | 40.1944°N 104.8211°W | 4,822 ft 1470 m | | | Trading post | |
| Franceville | | El Paso | 38.8066°N 104.5948°W | 6,077 ft 1852 m | 1881 | 1894 | Coal mining town | |
| Frankstown | | Douglas | 39.4327°N 104.7614°W | 6,060 ft 1847 m | 1859 | 1864 | Placer gold camp | Nothing remains. |
| Fulford (Note: Fulford is now a part of the Fulford CDP. The Fulford CDP lost both of its residents before the 2020 United States census.) | | Eagle | 39.5150°N 106.6564°W | 9,840 ft 2999 m | 1892 | 1910 | Mining camp | Structures remain. |
| Garo | | Park | 39.1078°N 105.8903°W | 9,197 ft 2803 m | 1880 | 1955 | Ranching town | Some structures remain. |
| Gato | | Archuleta | 37.0450°N 107.1973°W | 6,302 ft 1921 m | 1899 | 1954 | Ranching town | |
| Geneva City | | Clear Creek | 39.5739°N 105.8132°W | 11,585 ft 3531 m | | | Mining camp | Some structures remain. |
| Gillett | West Beaver Park, Cripple City, Gillette | Teller | 38.7819°N 105.1228°W | 9,938 ft 3029 m | 1894 | 1913 | Gold mining town | Little remains. |
| Gilman | | Eagle | 39.5328°N 106.3939°W | 8,951 ft 2728 m | 1886 | 1985 | Mining company town | Company town largely intact |
| Gladstone | | San Juan | 37.8903°N 107.6503°W | 10,505 ft 3202 m | 1878 | 1912 | | |
| Gold Park | | Eagle | 39.4014°N 106.4394°W | 9,268 ft 2825 m | 1881 | 1983 | Gold mining town | |
| Goldfield (Note: Goldfield is now a part of the Goldfield CDP. The Goldfield CDP had 63 residents at the 2020 United States census.) | | Teller | 38.7178°N 105.1261°W | 9,902 ft 3018 m | 1895 | 1932 | Gold mining town | Many structures remain. |
| Gothic | | Gunnison | 38.9592°N 106.9898°W | 9,485 ft 2891 m | 1879 | 1914 | Silver mining town (Note: The Rocky Mountain Biological Laboratory was founded in 1928 near the remains of Gothic, Colorado.) | Rocky Mountain Biological Laboratory |
| Grand Island | | Boulder | 39.9708°N 105.6033°W | 9,504 ft 2897 m | | | | |
| Graysill Mines | | San Juan | 37.7128°N 107.8986°W | 10,951 ft 3338 m | 1945 | 1963 | Uranium mining town | Structures remain. |
| Griffth | | La Plata | 37.2144°N 107.7962°W | 6,902 ft 2104 m | 1909 | 1924 | | |
| Guston | | Ouray | 37.9164°N 107.6903°W | 10,847 ft 3306 m | 1883 | 1898 | Silver mining town | Structures remain. |
| Gwillimsville | | El Paso | | | 1878 | 1890 | Ranching town | |
| Hamilton | | Park | | | 1860 | 1881 | Placer gold camp | Little remains. |
| Hancock | | Chaffee | 38.6397°N 106.3608°W | 11,054 ft 3369 m | 1880 | 1904 | Railroad and mining town | Little remains. |
| Haybro | Junction City | Routt | 40.3322°N 106.9595°W | 7,297 ft 2224 m | 1912 | 1951 | Coal mining town | Little remains. |
| Henderson Island | Island Station | Adams | 39.9300°N 104.8687°W | 5,010 ft 1527 m | 1859 | 1959 | Trail stop | Adams County Fairgrounds |
| Henson | | Hinsdale | 38.0208°N 107.3770°W | 9,236 ft 2815 m | 1871 | 1913 | Gold mining town | Structures remain. |
| Hessie | | Boulder | 39.9550°N 105.6000°W | 9,405 ft 2867 m | 1898 | 1902 | | |
| Highland (Note: Highland is now a part of the City and County of Denver.) | | Denver | 39.7603°N 105.0092°W | 5,236 ft 1596 m | 1858 (Note: Highland was platted in December 1858.) | 1859 | Placer gold camp | Denver neighborhood |
| Holy Cross City (Note: Located at an elevation of 11,428 feet (3,483 m), the Holy Cross, Colorado post office was the highest in the United States from November 11, 1883 to September 15, 1889.) | Holy Cross | Eagle | 39.4150°N 106.4781°W | 11,428 ft 3483 m | 1880 | 1905 | Mining town | Few structures remain. |
| Homestead Meadows | | Larimer | 40.3154°N 105.4565°W | 8,690 ft 2649 m | 1889 | 1952 | Ranch and logging community | National Register Historic District |
| Horseshoe | Horse Shoe; Doran | Park | 39.2039°N 106.0853°W | 10,557 ft 3218 m | 1880 | 1907 | | |
| Howardsville (Note: Howardsville served as the original seat of La Plata County, Colorado Territory since the county was created on February 10, 1874, until January 31, 1876.) | Bullion City | San Juan | 37.8356°N 107.5942°W | 9,748 ft 2971 m | 1874 | 1939 | Gold mining town | Modern mill |
| Howbert | | Park | | | 1887 | 1933 | Railroad and ranching town | Submerged in Eleven Mile Reservoir |
| Husted | | El Paso | | | 1878 | 1920 | Railroad and ranching town | Site in U.S. Air Force Academy |
| Independence | Farwell, Sparkill, Chipeta | Pitkin | 39.1072°N 106.6059°W | 10,913 ft 3326 m | 1879 | 1899 | Gold camp | National Register Historic District |
| Independence | Macon | Teller | 38.7322°N 105.1366°W | 10,640 ft 3243 m | 1899 | 1954 | Gold mining town | Little remains. |
| Iola | | Gunnison | 38.4750°N 107.0973°W | 7,523 ft 2293 m | 1896 | 1963 | Railroad town | Submerged in Blue Mesa Reservoir |
| Iron City | | Chaffee | 38.7086°N 106.3381°W | 9,901 ft 3018 m | | | | |
| Ironton | | Ouray | 37.9328°N 107.6803°W | 9,800 ft 2987 m | 1883 | 1920 | Silver mining town | Some structures remain. |
| Jimmy's Camp | Jimmy Camp | El Paso | | | 1833 | 1879 | Trading post and stage stop | Nothing remains. |
| Juanita | | Archuleta | 37.0272°N 107.1506°W | 6,375 ft 1943 m | 1904 | 1912 | Railroad and ranching town | Railroad structures remain. |
| Keota | | Weld | 40.7028°N 104.0752°W | 4,964 ft 1513 m | 1888 | 1973 | Railroad and ranching town | Structures remain. |
| Kings Canyon | | Jackson | 40.9269°N 106.2270°W | 8,396 ft 2559 m | 1928 | 1936 | Copper mining town | Little remains. |
| Kokomo | | Summit | 39.4242°N 106.1897°W | 10,696 ft 3260 m | 1879 | 1965 | Mining town | Buried under mine waste |
| La Veta Pass | Veta Pass, Uptop | Huerfano | 37.5931°N 105.2033°W | 9,390 ft 2862 m | 1877 | 1962 | Railroad and tourism town | National Register Historic District |
| Last Chance | | Washington | 39.7408°N 103.5916°W | 4,820 ft 1469 m | 1925 | | Farming town and highway stop | Structures remain. |
| Leavick | | Park | 39.1950°N 106.1375°W | 11,243 ft 3427 m | 1896 | 1899 | | |
| Lenado | | Pitkin | 39.2425°N 106.7625°W | 8,540 ft 2603 m | 1891 | 1907 | Mining town | Some structures remain. |
| Leonard | | San Miguel | 38.0639°N 108.0270°W | 7,749 ft 2362 m | 1900 | 1940 | | |
| Liberty | | Saguache | 37.8603°N 105.5958°W | 8,275 ft 2522 m | 1900 | 1921 | Gold mining town | |
| Logtown | | La Plata | 37.5517°N 107.5914°W | 11,561 ft 3524 m | | | | |
| Ludlow (Note: Ludlow was the site of the Ludlow Massacre of 1914.) | | Las Animas | 37.3333°N 104.5833°W | 6,283 ft 1915 m | 1896 | 1954 | Coal mining town | National Historic Landmark |
| Lulu City | | Grand | 40.4455°N 105.8481°W | 9,350 ft 2850 m | 1879 | 1951 | Silver camp | Three cabins remain. |
| Lytle | Turkey Creek | El Paso | 38.6019°N 104.8669°W | 6,250 ft 1905 m | 1877 | 1920 | Farming town | Schoolhouse remains. |
| Madrid | Madrid Plaza | Las Animas | 37.1276°N 104.6413°W | 6,286 ft 1916 m | 1864 | 1917 | Farming town | |
| Malachite | | Huerfano | 37.7544°N 105.2608°W | 7,491 ft 2283 m | 1880 | 1915 | Placer gold camp | |
| Malta | | Lake | 39.2294°N 106.3509°W | 9,590 ft 2923 m | 1875 | 1955 | Silver mining town | Schoolhouse remains. |
| Manhattan | | Larimer | 40.7322°N 105.6000°W | 8,475 ft 2583 m | 1887 | 1900 | Gold camp | Cemetery remains. |
| Masters | | Weld | 40.3094°N 104.2450°W | 4,456 ft 1358 m | 1900 | 1967 | Railroad and farming town | |
| Mayday (Note: Mayday was built upon the remnants of the earlier Parrott City.) | | La Plata | 37.3506°N 108.0767°W | 8,734 ft 2662 m | 1913 | 1914 | Mining town | Structures remain. |
| Mayflower Gulch | | Summit | | | | | Mining town | Structures remain. |
| McConnellsville | | El Paso | | | | | Railroad station | |
| McFerran | | El Paso | | | 1889 | 1896 | Farming town | |
| McPhee | | Montezuma | | | 1924 | 1948 | Logging company town | Submerged in McPhee Reservoir |
| Middleton | | San Juan | 37.8550°N 107.5723°W | 9,794 ft 2985 m | 1883 | | Gold mining town | Little remains. |
| Midway | | Gunnison | 38.3439°N 107.0539°W | 8,556 ft 2608 m | | | | |
| Mineral Point | | Weld | | | 1873 | 1897 | Mining camp | Some structures remain. |
| Mirage | Cotton Creek | Saguache | 38.1028°N 105.8645°W | 7,657 ft 2334 m | 1875 | 1927 | | |
| Missouri City | Missouri Flats | Gilpin | 39.7901°N 105.5073°W | 8,870 ft 2704 m | 1860 | 1863 | Placer gold camp | A single grave remains. |
| Montana (Note: Montana is now a part of the City and County of Denver.) | Montana City | Denver | 39.6767°N 104.9950°W | 5,210 ft 1588 m | 1858 (Note: Montana was the first gold camp of the Pike's Peak Gold Rush.) | 1859 (Note: In 1859, most of the residents of Montana left for the Cherry Creek Diggings.) | Placer gold camp | Near Grant-Frontier Park in south Denver |
| Montezuma (Note: The residents of Montezuma reactivated the Town of Montezuma.) | | Summit | 39.5811°N 105.8672°W | 10,312 ft 3143 m | 1865 | | Silver mining town | Town government reactivated |
| Montgomery | Montgomery City | Park | | | 1881 | 1888 | Gold camp | Submerged in Montgomery Reservoir |
| Morley | | Las Animas | 37.0320°N 104.5047°W | 7,027 ft 2142 m | 1878 | 1956 | Railroad and coal mining town | |
| Mound City | Mound | Teller | 38.7246°N 105.1769°W | 9,219 ft 2810 m | 1893 | 1894 | | |
| Mount Vernon (Note: Mount Vernon was the home of Jefferson Territorial Governor Robert Williamson Steele and the administrative capital of the Provisional Government of the Territory of Jefferson.) | | Jefferson | 39.6935°N 105.2065°W | 6,340 ft 1932 m | 1859 | 1885 | Trail stop | Located in Matthews/Winters Park |
| Mystic | | Routt | 40.5700°N 106.9959°W | 6,900 ft 2103 m | 1910 | 1942 | Ranching town | Little remains. |
| Needleton | | San Juan | 37.6406°N 107.6915°W | 8,278 ft 2523 m | 1882 | 1910 | Railroad town | |
| Nevadaville | Nevada, Nevada City, Bald Mountain | Gilpin | 39.7953°N 105.5325°W | 9,121 ft 2780 m | 1861 | 1921 | Mining town | Some residents remain. |
| Niegoldstown | | San Juan | | | 1878 | 1881 | Mining camp | Some structures remain. |
| Ninetyfour | | Clear Creek | 39.8275°N 105.6364°W | 10,538 ft 3212 m | | | | |
| Norrie (Note: Norrie is now a part of the Norrie CDP. The Norrie CDP had seven residents at the 2020 United States census.) | Norrie Colony | Pitkin | 39.3247°N 106.6556°W | 8,462 ft 2579 m | | | Railroad and logging camp | Summer cabins |
| North Creede | Jimtown | Mineral | 37.8642°N 106.9259°W | 8,964 ft 2732 m | 1908 | 1919 | Silver mining town | Few structures remain. |
| North Star | Lake's Camp | Gunnison | | | 1889 | 1894 | Mining camp | Some structures remain. |
| Ohio | Ohio City | Gunnison | 38.5667°N 106.6117°W | 8,570 ft 2612 m | 1880 | 1972 | Mining town | Some residents |
| Old Mountain View | | El Paso | 38.8339°N 104.9914°W | 9,635 ft 2937 m | | | | |
| Old Roach | | Larimer | 40.9244°N 106.1172°W | 9,380 ft 2859 m | 1923 | 1938 | Logging company town | |
| Old Zounds | O.Z. | El Paso | | | 1877 | 1889 | Ranching village | |
| Orient | | Saguache | 38.2043°N 105.8168°W | 8,885 ft 2708 m | 1894 | 1905 | Iron mining town | Two adjacent townsites |
| Oro City (Note: On November 1, 1861, the Territory of Colorado created 17 original counties, with Oro City as the original seat of Lake County, Colorado Territory, serving until 1866.) (Note: Located at an elevation of 10,708 feet (3,264 m), the Oro City, Kansas Territory post office (became Oro City, Colorado Territory on February 28, 1861) was the highest in the United States from February 16 to November 13, 1861, and again from January 25, 1873 to February 7, 1875.) | Oro | Lake | 39.2353°N 106.2522°W | 10,708 ft 3264 m | 1861 | 1895 | Gold camp | |
| Pagosa Junction | | Archuleta | 37.0381°N 107.1992°W | 6,266 ft 1910 m | 1899 | 1954 | Railroad town | Some structures remain. |
| Pando | | Eagle | 39.4572°N 106.3336°W | 9,203 ft 2805 m | 1891 | 1942 | Railroad station | |
| Pandora | | San Miguel | 37.9333°N 107.7856°W | 8,954 ft 2729 m | 1881 | 1902 | Mining camp | Little remains. |
| Park City | Park | Park | 39.2783°N 106.0931°W | 10,501 ft 3201 m | 1879 | 1891 | | |
| Parkville (Note: On November 1, 1861, the Territory of Colorado created 17 original counties, with Parkville as the original seat of Summit County, Colorado Territory. Parkville served as county seat until the following year.) | Park City | Summit | 39.4989°N 105.9500°W | 10,466 ft 3190 m | 1861 | 1866 | Gold camp | Cemetery remains. |
| Parrott City (Note: On January 31, 1876, county voters selected Parrott City as the new seat of La Plata County, Colorado Territory, and after statehood on August 1, 1876, the seat of La Plata County, Colorado until 1881.) | Parrott | La Plata | 37.3506°N 108.0767°W | 8,734 ft 2662 m | 1876 | 1898 | Mining camp | Remnants of Mayday |
| Pearl | | Jackson | 40.9852°N 106.5470°W | 8,406 ft 2562 m | 1889 | 1919 | Copper mining town | Many structures remain. |
| Perigo | | Gilpin | 39.8792°N 105.5308°W | 9,639 ft 2938 m | 1895 | 1905 | | |
| Phoenix | | Gilpin | 39.9286°N 105.5356°W | 9,169 ft 2795 m | | | | |
| Pieplant Mill | Pieplant | Gunnison | 38.9380°N 106.5595°W | 10,309 ft 3142 m | 1904 | 1906 | Mining town | |
| Pinneo | | Washington | 40.2094°N 103.4386°W | 4,364 ft 1330 m | 1883 | 1931 | Farming town | |
| Pittsburg | | Gunnison | 38.9522°N 107.0625°W | 9,279 ft 2828 m | 1881 | 1896 | Mining town | Little remains. |
| Platte Station | Platte | Park | | | 1876 | 1894 | Stage stop | |
| Poudre City | | Larimer | 40.6980°N 105.6233°W | 7,332 ft 2235 m | 1888 | 1891 (Note: Poudre City was destroyed by the collapse of the Chambers Lake Dam on June 10, 1891.) | Gold mill town | Nothing remains. |
| Preston | | Summit | 39.4958°N 106.0211°W | 10,731 ft 3271 m | 1875 | 1889 | Gold camp | |
| Primero | | Las Animas | 37.1425°N 104.7417°W | 6,815 ft 2077 m | 1901 | 1933 | Coal company town | |
| Proctor | | Logan | 40.8069°N 102.9516°W | 3,780 ft 1152 m | 1908 | 1963 | Railroad and farming town | Some structures remain. |
| Purcell | | Weld | 40.6383°N 104.6016°W | 5,023 ft 1531 m | 1909 | 1951 | Farming town | Some structures remain. |
| Quartz | | Gunnison | | | 1882 | 1886 | Gold camp | Historical marker |
| Quartzville | | Park | 39.3450°N 106.0772°W | 11,571 ft 3527 m | | | | |
| Querida | Bassickville; Bassick City | Custer | 38.1261°N 105.3344°W | 8,987 ft 2739 m | 1880 | 1906 | Silver mining town | |
| Red Mountain | Red Mountain Town | Ouray | 37.9036°N 107.7026°W | 10,935 ft 3333 m | 1883 | 1913 | Silver mining town | Few original structures |
| Rexford (Note: Located at an elevation of 11,431 feet (3,484 m), the Rexford, Colorado post office was the highest in the United States from January 9, 1882 to November 10, 1883.) | | Summit | 39.5339°N 105.8958°W | 11,431 ft 3484 m | 1881 | 1883 | Gold camp | Structures remain. |
| Robinson | Ten Mile | Summit | | | 1879 | 1911 | Mining town | |
| Romley | | Chaffee | 38.6750°N 106.3700°W | 10,319 ft 3145 m | 1886 | 1924 | Railroad and mining town | Little remains. |
| Roses Cabin | | Hinsdale | | | 1874 | 1887 | Mining camp | Little remains. |
| Rosita | | Custer | 38.0972°N 105.3361°W | 8,809 ft 2685 m | 1874 | 1966 | Ranching and silver mining town | One business open |
| Ruby | Lincoln Creek | Pitkin | 39.0208°N 106.6092°W | 11,382 ft 3469 m | | | Mining camp | Some structures remain. |
| Ruby City | | Ouray | | | 1878 | 1879 | Mining camp | Some structures remain. |
| Ruedi | | Eagle | 39.3664°N 106.7981°W | 7,772 ft 2369 m | 1889 | 1941 | | Under Ruedi Reservoir |
| Russell Gulch | | Gilpin | 39.7786°N 105.5369°W | 9,147 ft 2788 m | 1859 | 1943 | Placer gold camp | Some residents remain. |
| Russellville | | Douglas | | | 1862 | 1862 | Placer gold camp | Later structures remain. |
| St. Charles (Note: St. Charles is now a part of the City and County of Denver.) | | Denver | 39.7533°N 105.0031°W | 5,184 ft 1580 m | 1858 (Note: St. Charles was platted on September 24, 1858.) | 1858 (Note: St. Charles was "annexed" by the Denver City Town Company on November 17, 1858.) | Placer gold camp | Site around Denver Union Station |
| Saint Elmo | | Chaffee | 38.7047°N 106.3481°W | 10,007 ft 3050 m | 1880 | 1952 | Railroad and mining town | National Register Historic District |
| Saint Vrain (Note: On November 28, 1859, the Provisional Government of the Territory of Jefferson created 12 counties, with Saint Vrain as the seat of St. Vrain County, Jefferson Territory. On November 1, 1861, the new Territory of Colorado created 17 original counties, with Saint Vrain as the original seat of Weld County, Colorado Territory, serving until 1868.) | | Weld | 40.2770°N 104.8527°W | 4,762 ft 1451 m | 1837 | 1875 | Trading village | Adjacent to site of Fort Saint Vrain |
| Saint Vrains | | Weld | 40.0369°N 104.9547°W | 5,109 ft 1557 m | 1915 | 1918 | Farming town | |
| Saints John | Coleyville, Saint John | Summit | 39.5717°N 105.8817°W | 10,765 ft 3281 m | 1863 | 1881 | Silver camp | Some residents remain. |
| San Juan City (Note: San Juan City served as the original seat of Hinsdale County, Colorado Territory from the time the county was created on February 10, 1874, until 1875. On June 4, 1874, San Juan City officially shortened its name to San Juan, although it was still commonly known as San Juan City.) | San Juan | Mineral (Note: San Juan was located in Hinsdale County until the creation of Mineral County on March 27, 1893.) | 37.7857°N 107.1441°W | 9,028 ft 2752 m | 1874 | 1923 | Stage stop | One cabin remains. |
| Schofield | | Gunnison | | | 1880 | 1886 | Mining camp | Little remains. |
| Sedgewick | | Saguache | 38.2792°N 106.1478°W | 9,232 ft 2814 m | 1880 | 1885 | | |
| Sellar | | Pitkin | | | 1888 | 1918 | Stage stop | Structures remain. |
| Serene (Note: Serene was the site of the Columbine Mine Massacre of 1927.) | | Weld | 40.0242°N 105.0259°W | 5,185 ft 1580 m | 1923 | 1942 | Coal company town | |
| Seven Lakes | | Teller | 38.7817°N 105.0086°W | 10,985 ft 3348 m | 1877 | | Mining and tourist town | Mine structures remain. |
| Shavano | | Chaffee | 38.6028°N 106.2903°W | 10,748 ft 3276 m | 1880 | 1930 | | |
| Sherman | | Hinsdale | | | 1890 | 1892 | Mining camp | Some structures remain. |
| Sherrod | | Gunnison | | | 1904 | 1906 | Mining camp | Little remains. |
| Shirley | | Chaffee | 38.4244°N 106.1284°W | 8,651 ft 2637 m | | | | |
| Siloam | | Pueblo | 38.2514°N 104.9758°W | 5,450 ft 1661 m | 1891 | 1943 | Farming town | Little remains. |
| Silver Creek | Daileyville | Clear Creek | 39.7536°N 105.6322°W | 9,120 ft 2780 m | 1875 | | Silver camp | |
| Silverdale | | Clear Creek | 39.6917°N 105.6961°W | 9,275 ft 2827 m | 1882 | 1882 | Silver camp | |
| Sligo | | Weld | | | 1908 | 1941 | Railroad town | |
| Smuggler | | San Miguel | | | 1895 | 1928 | Mining camp | Structures remain. |
| Sneffels | Mount Sneffels | Ouray | 37.9753°N 107.7498°W | 10,621 ft 3237 m | 1879 | 1930 | Mining camp | |
| Sopris | | Las Animas | 37.1347°N 104.5644°W | 6,234 ft 1900 m | 1888 | 1969 | Coal mining town | Submerged in Trinidad Lake |
| South Denver (Note: South Denver is now a part of the City and County of Denver.) | | Denver | 39.6786°N 104.9694°W | 5,344 ft 1629 m | 1886 | 1894 (Note: The City of Denver annexed the Town of South Denver in 1894.) | Residential community | Several Denver neighborhoods |
| Spar City | Spar | Mineral | 37.7072°N 106.9684°W | 9,466 ft 2885 m | 1892 | 1895 | Silver mining town | Summer cabins |
| Stonewall | | Chaffee | 38.6311°N 106.3597°W | 11,263 ft 3433 m | | | | |
| Stout | Petra | Larimer | 40.5266°N 105.1576°W | 5,340 ft 1628 m | 1882 | 1908 | Sandstone quarry town | Submerged in Horsetooth Reservoir |
| Summitville (Note: Located at an elevation of 11,287 feet (3,440 m), the Summit, Colorado Territory post office (became Summit, Colorado on August 1, 1876 and name changed to Summitville, Colorado on November 17, 1880) was the highest in the United States from February 10, 1876 to September 24, 1879, and again from October 16, 1879 to January 8, 1882.) | Summit | Rio Grande | 37.4306°N 106.5923°W | 11,287 ft 3440 m | 1876 | 1947 | Gold mining town | Many structures remain. |
| Sunset | | Boulder | 40.0358°N 105.4689°W | 7,743 ft 2360 m | 1883 | 1921 | Gold mining town | Structures remain. |
| Swallows | | Pueblo | 38.3022°N 104.8603°W | 4,885 ft 1489 m | 1892 | 1947 | Railroad town | Submerged in Pueblo Reservoir |
| Swan | | Chaffee | 38.6800°N 106.0420°W | 7,463 ft 2275 m | | | | |
| Swandyke | | Summit | 39.5083°N 105.8922°W | 11,076 ft 3376 m | 1898 | 1910 | Gold mining town | Structures remain. |
| Table Rock | | El Paso | | | 1870 | 1893 | Ranching town | |
| Tarryall (Note: Tarryall City was the seat of Park County, Jefferson Territory and then Park County, Colorado Territory from its creation on November 1, 1861 until 1866.) (founded 1859) | | Park | | | 1859 | 1863 | Placer gold camp | Nothing remains. |
| Tarryall (founded 1896) | Puma City | Park | 39.1219°N 105.4756°W | 8,714 ft 2656 m | 1896 | 1933 | Gold mining town | Some residents remain. |
| Teller City | | Jackson | 40.4333°N 106.0034°W | 9,288 ft 2831 m | 1879 | 1885 | Silver camp | Structures remain. |
| Tellurium | | Hinsdale | | | 1875 | 1880 | Mill town | Few structures remain. |
| Tercio | | Las Animas | 37.0520°N 104.9967°W | 7,737 ft 2358 m | 1902 | 1949 | Coal company town | Some structures remain. |
| Thomasville | Calcium | Pitkin | 39.3603°N 106.7025°W | 8,019 ft 2444 m | 1888 | 1918 | Railroad and lime kiln town | Many structures remain. |
| Tiger | | Summit | 39.5228°N 105.9621°W | 9,669 ft 2947 m | 1919 | 1940 | Mining company town | Little remains. |
| Tincup | Virginia, Virginia City, Tin Cup | Gunnison | 38.7544°N 106.4784°W | 10,158 ft 3096 m | 1878 | 1918 | Gold mining town | Many structures and summer homes |
| Tioga | | Huerfano | 37.6989°N 104.9275°W | 6,549 ft 1996 m | 1907 | 1954 | Ranching town | Little remains. |
| Tomboy | Savage Basin Camp | San Miguel | 37.9367°N 107.7545°W | 11,510 ft 3508 m | 1894 | 1926 | Gold camp and later zinc mine | Some structures remain. |
| Tomichi | Argenta | Chaffee | | | 1880 | 1899 | Mining camp | Cemetery remains. |
| Trump | | Park | 38.8492°N 105.7883°W | 9,436 ft 2876 m | 1928 | 1931 | Ranching town | |
| Tuckerville | | La Plata | 37.4925°N 107.4853°W | 10,652 ft 3247 m | | | | |
| Tungsten | | Boulder | 39.9719°N 105.4761°W | 7,993 ft 2436 m | 1916 | 1949 | Tungsten mining town | |
| Turret | | Chaffee | 38.6403°N 105.9889°W | 8,537 ft 2602 m | 1898 | 1939 | Granite quarry town | Privately held |
| Tuttle | | Kit Carson | 39.4974°N 102.5109°W | 4,023 ft 1226 m | 1883 | 1918 | Farming town | Foundations remain. |
| Ula (Note: Ula served as the original seat of Custer County, Colorado from the time the county was created on March 9, 1877, until 1878.) | | Custer | 38.1501°N 105.5019°W | 7,802 ft 2378 m | 1871 | 1891 | Ranching town | Cemetery remains. |
| Uravan | | Montrose | 38.3683°N 108.7365°W | 4,990 ft 1521 m | 1936 | 1986 | Uranium company town | Little remains. |
| Vicksburgh | Vicksburg | Chaffee | 38.9992°N 106.3778°W | 9,672 ft 2948 m | 1881 | 1885 | Mining camp | National Register Historic District |
| Virginia Dale | | Larimer | 40.9547°N 105.3492°W | 7,034 ft 2144 m | 1862 | 1967 | Stage stop | Stage station preserved |
| Virginius | | Ouray | | | 1887 | 1894 | Mining camp | Mine structures remain. |
| Vulcan | | Gunnison | 38.3455°N 107.0014°W | 8,924 ft 2720 m | 1894 | 1912 | Gold mining town | Several structures remain. |
| Wagon Wheel Gap | Thornton | Mineral | 37.7736°N 106.8312°W | 8,468 ft 2581 m | 1848 | 1957 | Stage stop & resort | Dude ranch & hot springs |
| Waldorf | | Gilpin | | | 1868 | 1912 | Mining town | Little remains. |
| Wason (Note: Wason served eight months as the original seat of Mineral County, Colorado, from the creation of the county on March 27, 1893, until November 7 of that year.) | | Mineral | 37.8242°N 106.8931°W | 8,585 ft 2617 m | 1891 | 1904 | Silver mining town | Located on Wason Ranch |
| Weaver | | Mineral | 37.8839°N 106.9312°W | 9,863 ft 3006 m | 1891 | 1895 | Silver mining town | Few structures remain. |
| Webster | | Park | 39.4575°N 105.7203°W | 9,042 ft 2756 m | 1877 | 1909 | Ore shipping town | Little remains. |
| Wezel | | Lincoln | 38.7983°N 103.4547°W | 4,796 ft 1462 m | 1911 | 1919 | | |
| Wideawake | | Gilpin | 39.8500°N 105.5217°W | 9,363 ft 2854 m | | | | |
| Winfield | | Chaffee | 38.9847°N 106.4409°W | 10,243 ft 3122 m | 1861 | 1912 | Silver mining town | Several structures remain. |
| Wortman | | Lake | 39.3570°N 106.1727°W | 10,997 ft 3352 m | 1900 | 1919 | | |
| Yankee | | Clear Creek | 39.8264°N 105.6239°W | 10,951 ft 3338 m | 1893 | 1910 | | |

== Gallery ==
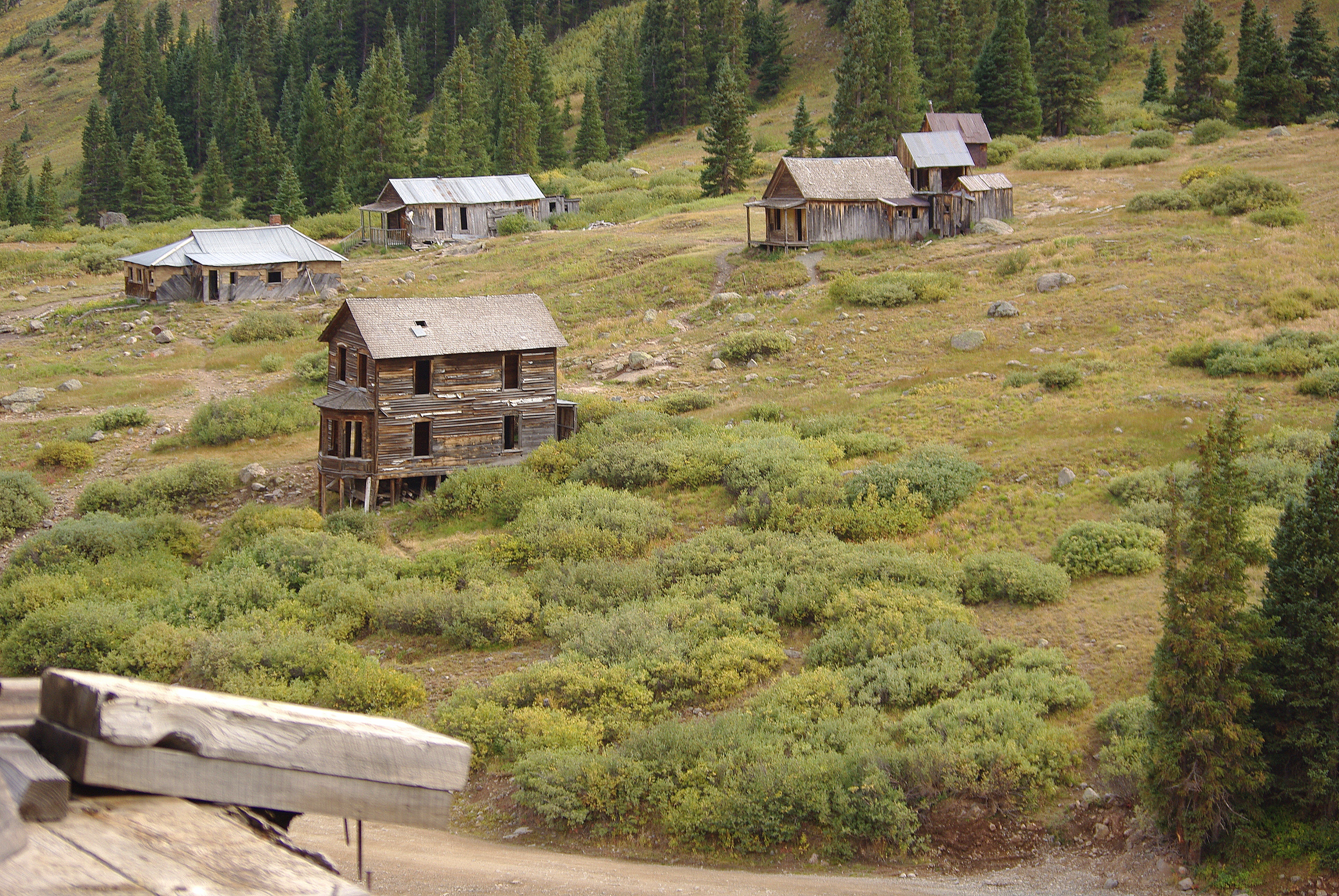
Abandoned buildings at Animas Forks, Colorado

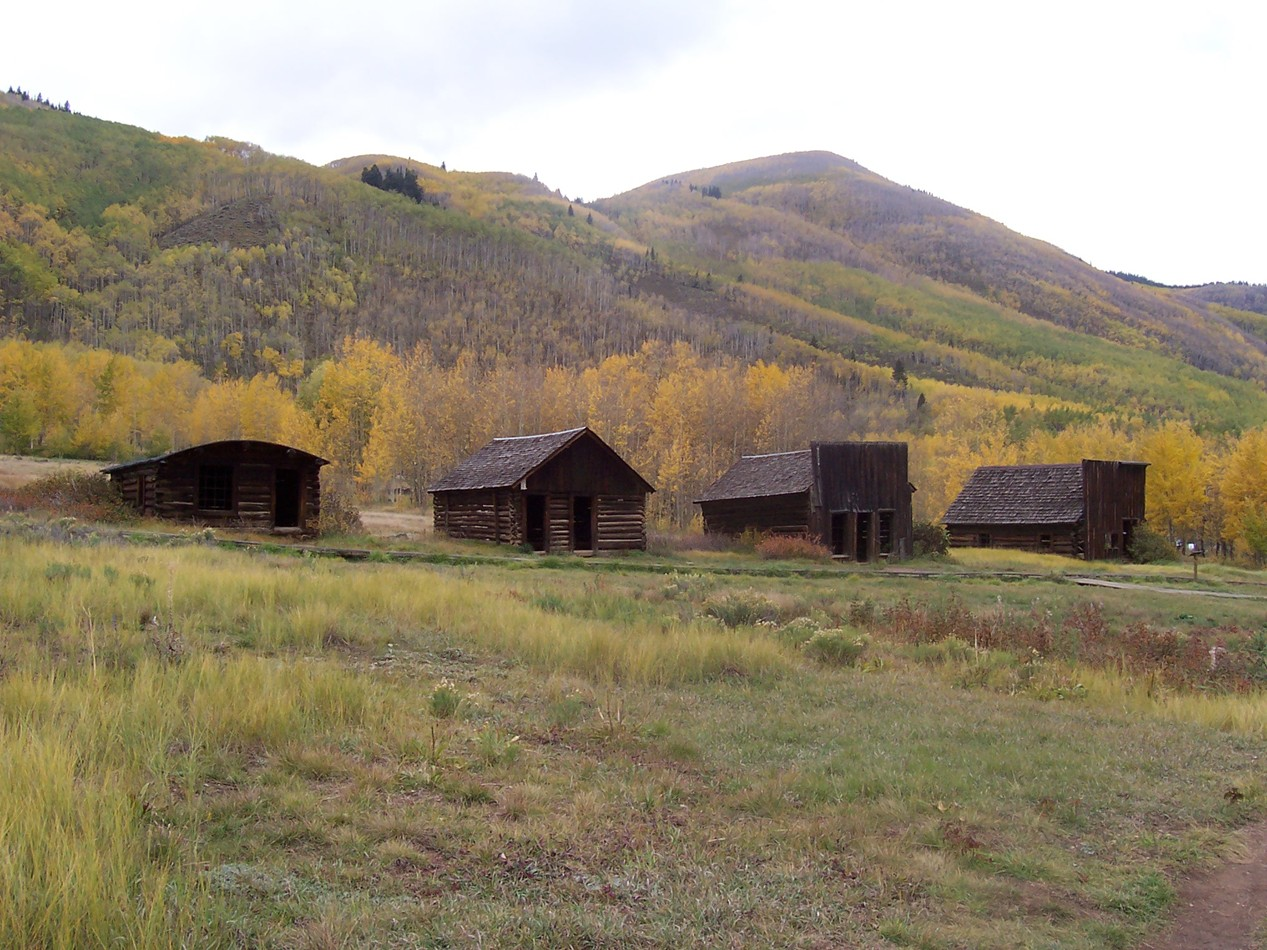
Houses along Ashcroft, Colorado's Main Street, 2007

Token coin with the value of $1.00, issued by the Rawley Mine Commissary in Bonanza, Colorado

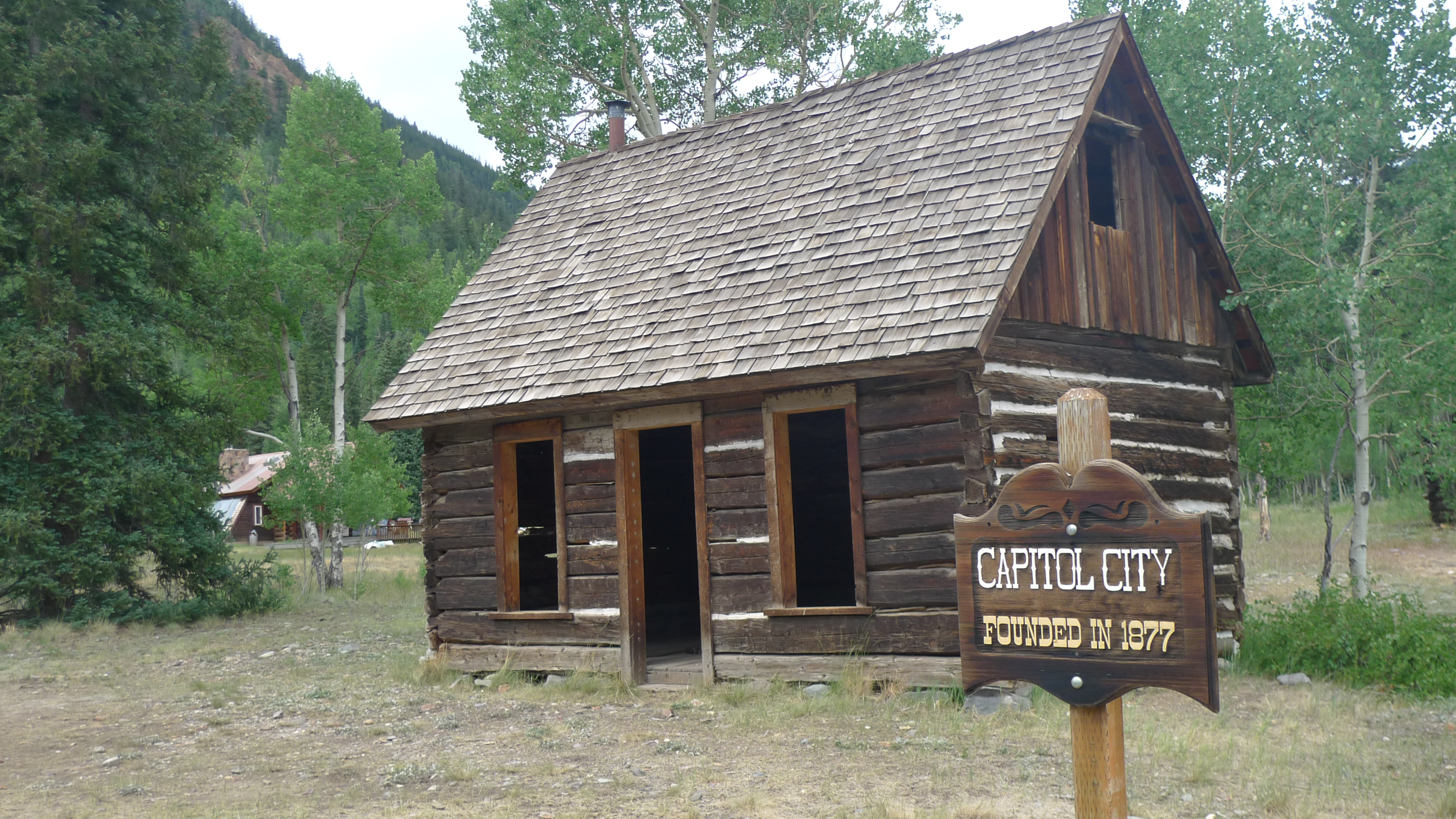
Capitol City, Colorado

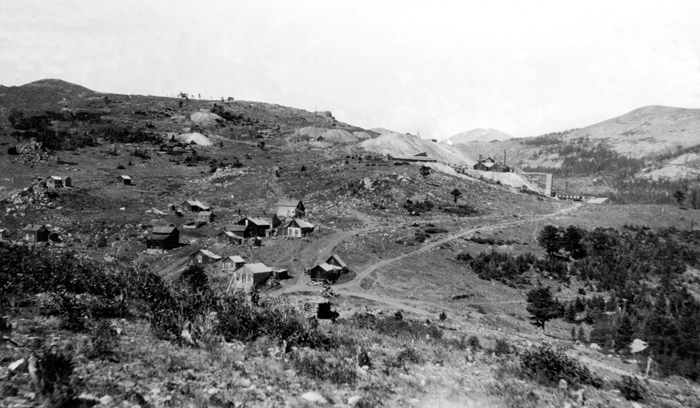
Caribou, Colorado circa 1911

Caribou, Colorado in 2005

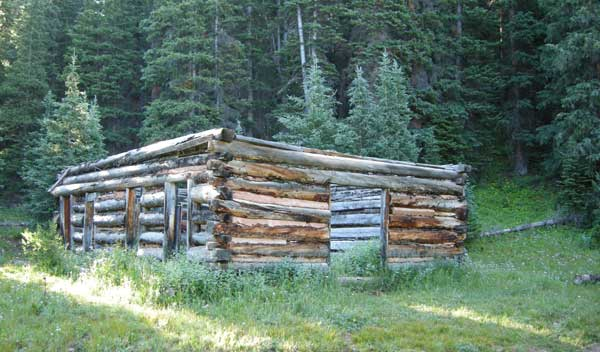
The remains of an old cabin at Dyersville, Colorado

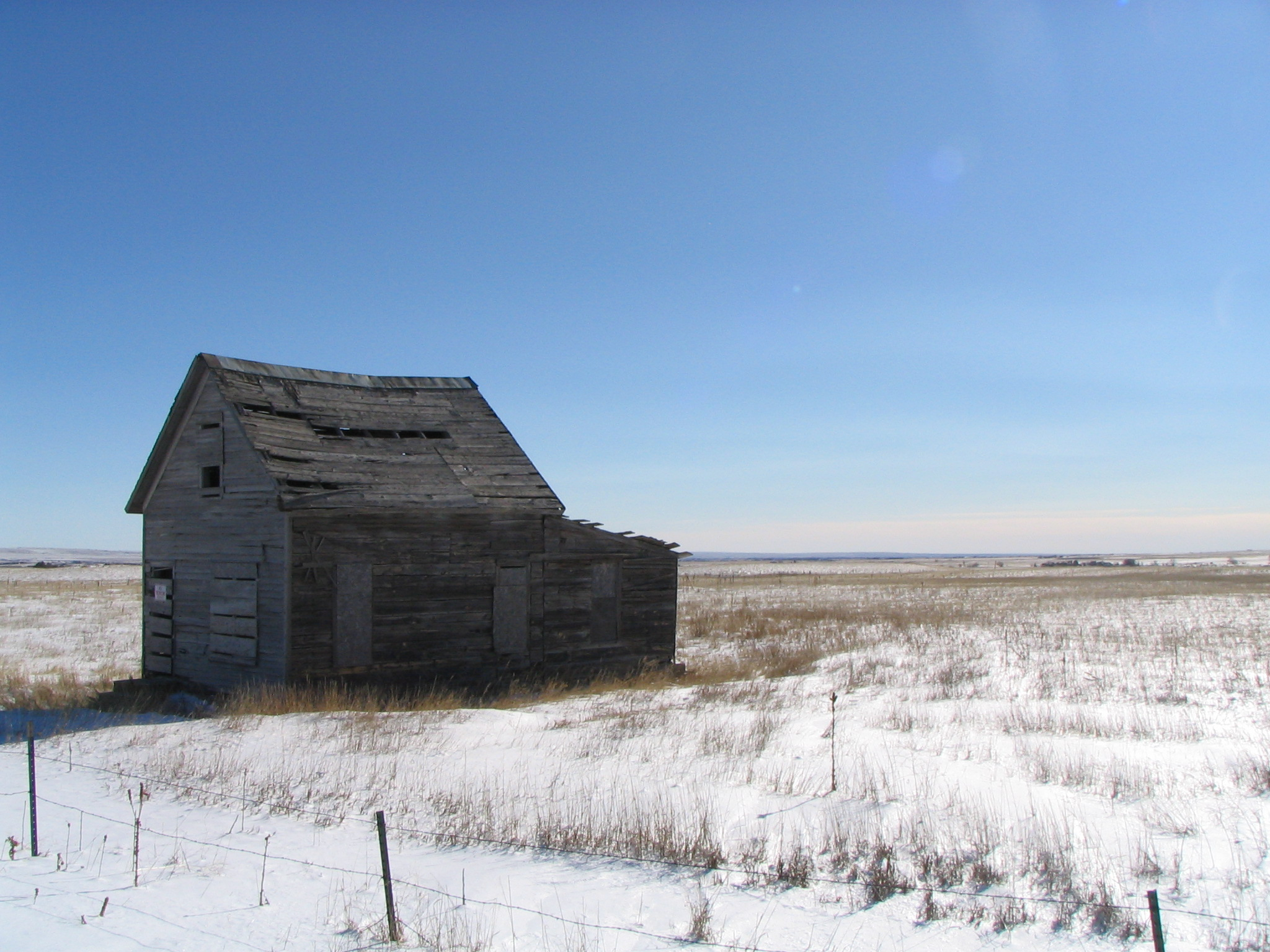
An abandoned house in Eastonville, Colorado

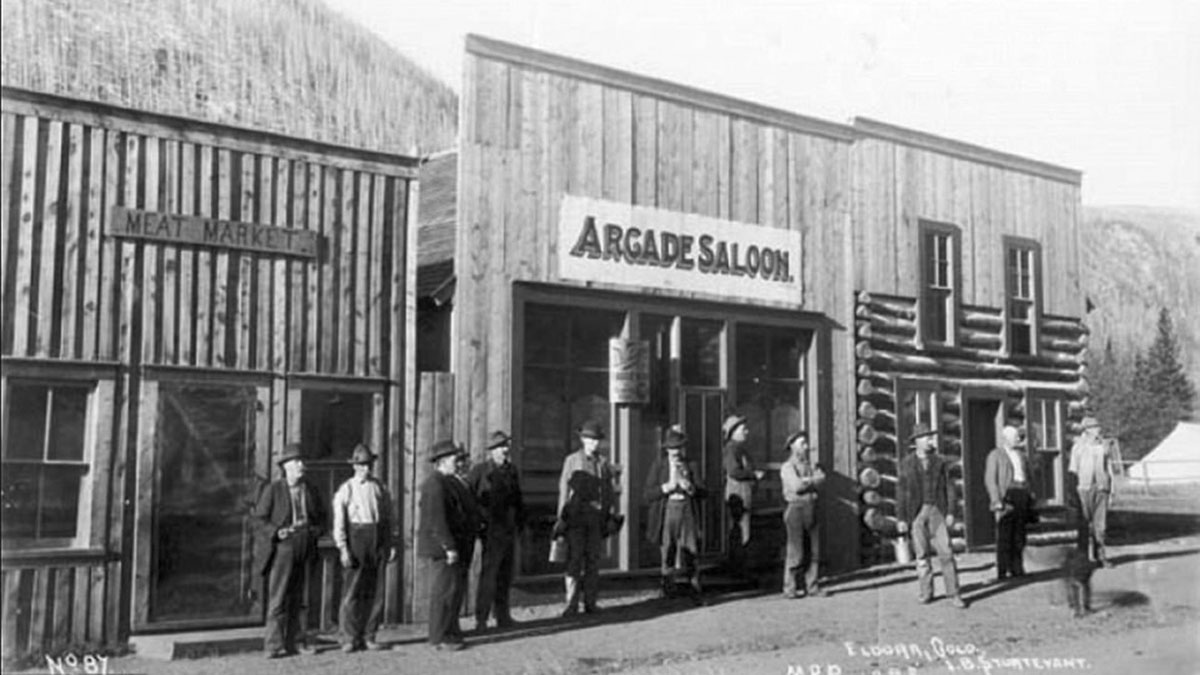
The Arcade Saloon in Eldora, Colorado in 1898

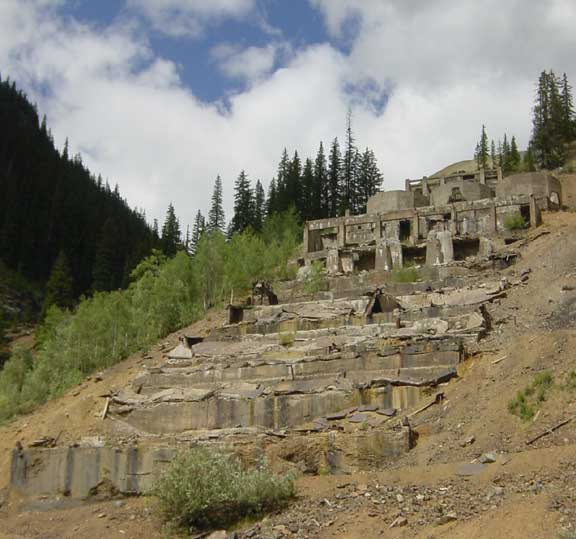
Remains of the old ore mill in Eureka, Colorado

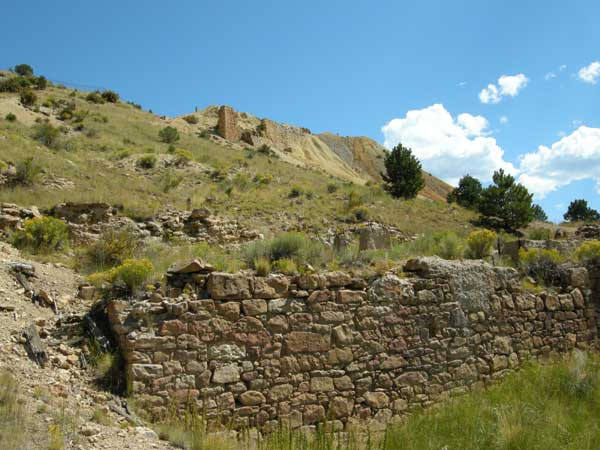
Remains of the Bassick silver mine, Querida, Colorado

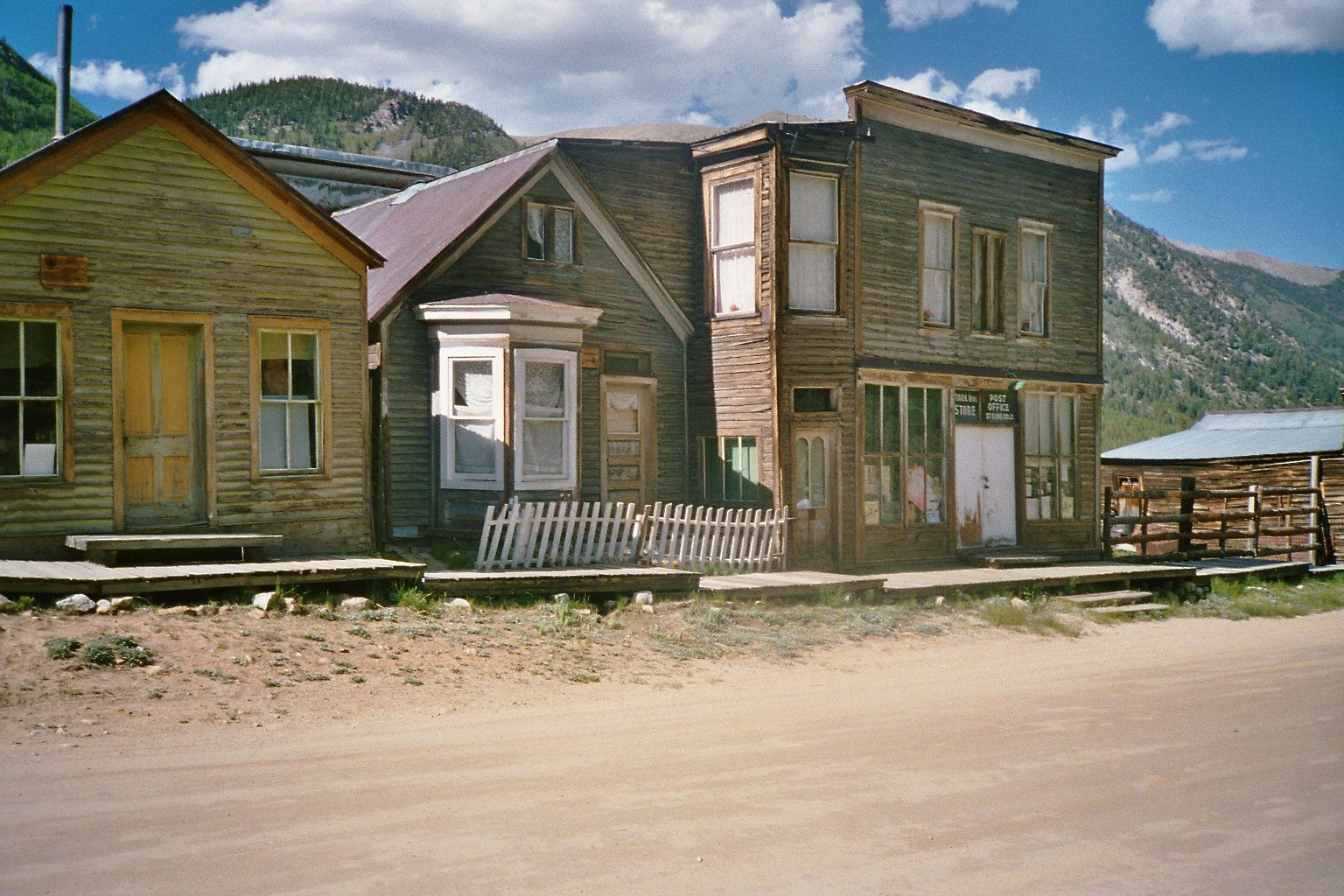
Saint Elmo, Colorado in 2005

== See also ==
- List of places in Colorado
- Bibliography of Colorado
- Geography of Colorado
- History of Colorado
- Index of Colorado-related articles
- List of Colorado-related lists
  - List of populated places in Colorado
    - List of census-designated places in Colorado
    - List of counties in Colorado
    - List of county seats in Colorado
    - List of forts in Colorado
    - List of municipalities in Colorado
    - List of post offices in Colorado
    - List of trading posts in Colorado
- Outline of Colorado
