= Missouri City, Colorado =

Missouri City
- Ghost Town
- Location within Colorado
- Coordinates: 39°47′26″N 105°30′51″W
- Country: United States of America
- State: Colorado
- County: Gilpin

Population (1860)
  - Total: 597

Missouri City, also known as Missouri Flats, was a town in Colorado.

== History ==
Missouri City was founded in 1860. According to the 1860 census, 528 males and 69 females lived there, for a total population of 597. It had a post office from 1860 to 1863. Today, the only evidence of its existence is a single grave that makes up the Missouri City Cemetery in Gilpin County, Colorado.

== Geography ==
The site of Missouri City is located next to Central City Parkway near Central City, Colorado.

== See also ==
- Bibliography of Colorado
- Geography of Colorado
- History of Colorado
- Index of Colorado-related articles
- List of Colorado-related lists
  - List of ghost towns in Colorado
- Outline of Colorado
