= Mount Vernon, Colorado =

Ghost town in Colorado, United States

Coordinates: 39°41′26.58″N 105°12′30.96″W

Mount Vernon is an extinct town from the former Jefferson Territory, the site of which is located in present-day Jefferson County, Colorado.

Mount Vernon was founded in 1859 by Dr. Joseph Casto who followed the gold rush to Colorado in 1858. He did not find gold, but decided to establish a town between the mining camps and the city of Denver. With three other men, he founded the Denver, Auraria, and Colorado Wagon Company in December 1859.

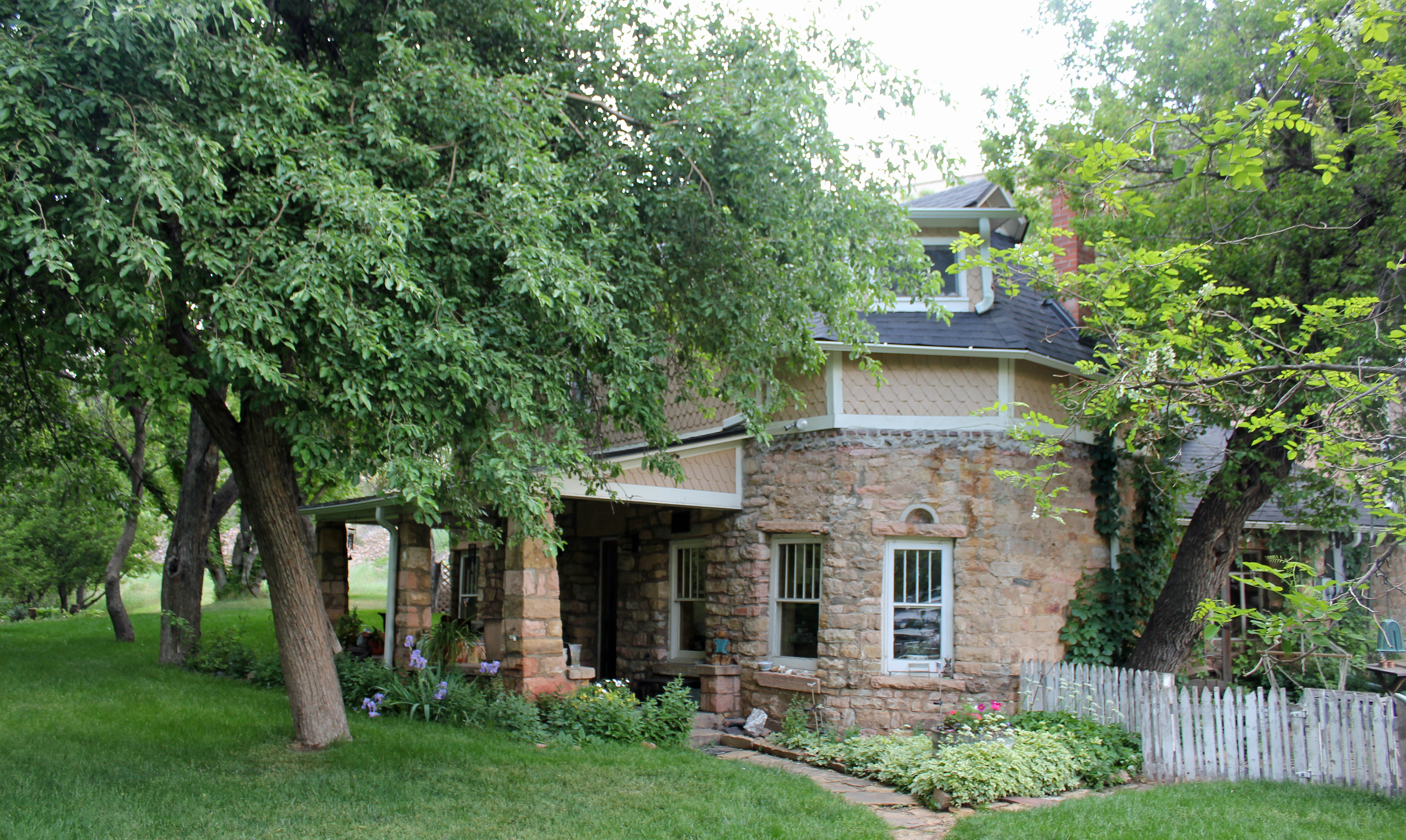
The Mount Vernon House in 2013

After gold ore was discovered near Central City in 1859, a trail was established through Mount Vernon. It was a main route into the mountain. A toll road that passed through Mount Vernon and through Mount Vernon Canyon was built by the wagon company, and then purchased in 1880 by Jefferson County and no longer requiring a toll to use the road. The road became U.S. 40, and then Interstate 70.

At its height, there were about 200 people who lived in the town, but by 1885 it only had 50 residents. One of the town's citizens was Robert Williamson Steele, the governor of Jefferson Territory, who often worked out of his Mount Vernon house. The town had its own post office, two hotels, homes, and a store. It was described as a "beautiful and romantic village... [with] a number of neat and tidy houses." The town had a gypsum deposit and it had limestone and lime kilns. The town was abandoned over time.

Its cemetery still exists on the Village Trail within the Jefferson County Open Space. With a grave stone dated 1860, it is one of the oldest cemeteries in the state.

== See also ==
- Bibliography of Colorado
- Geography of Colorado
- History of Colorado
- Index of Colorado-related articles
- List of Colorado-related lists
  - List of ghost towns in Colorado
- Outline of Colorado
