= Duncan, Colorado =

Ghost town in Saguache County, Colorado, United States

- ghost town
- Location of Duncan, Colorado. Duncan (Colorado)
- Coordinates: 37°52′27″N 105°36′52″W
- Country: United States
- State: Colorado
- County: Saguache
- Elevation: 8,107 ft (2,471 m)
- Time zone: UTC−07:00 (MST)
  - Summer (DST): UTC−06:00 (MDT)
- ZIP code: Crestone 81131
- Area code: 719
- GNIS place ID: 192560

Duncan is an extinct town in Saguache County, Colorado, about 8 miles south of Crestone, Colorado. Only one house remains, John Duncan's cabin. Duncan was on the Luis Maria Baca Grant No. 4 and is now within Rio Grande National Forest.

== History ==
Duncan, Colorado was first founded in 1874 when John Duncan found gold ore in a nearby river. Other prospectors soon settled around his cabin, and by 1890 a town was established. The town was plotted by John Duncan, lots were sold, gold mines promoted, home were built, businesses established, even a newspaper, The Duncan Eagle. At that point, he sold lots in town for $25 a piece. The Duncan, Colorado, post office operated from November 21, 1892, until September 15, 1900. Mail came six days a week and served 250 residents of the area. A school district formed in 1893 to serve the community and the last classes were held in 1899.

In 1900, George Adams purchased the Luis Maria Baca Grant No. 4, which allowed him to claim property and mineral rights. This caused the settlers to be considered squatters, and after a supreme court battle, settlers were pushed off the land. Settlers were paid $125 for each structure. Some of the residents of Duncan moved to a new townsite, just off the Grant property to the south, Liberty, Colorado.

In 2011, Duncan Cabin was renovated and is now able to be rented out to visitors.

== See also ==
- List of ghost towns in Colorado
