= Mayday, Colorado =

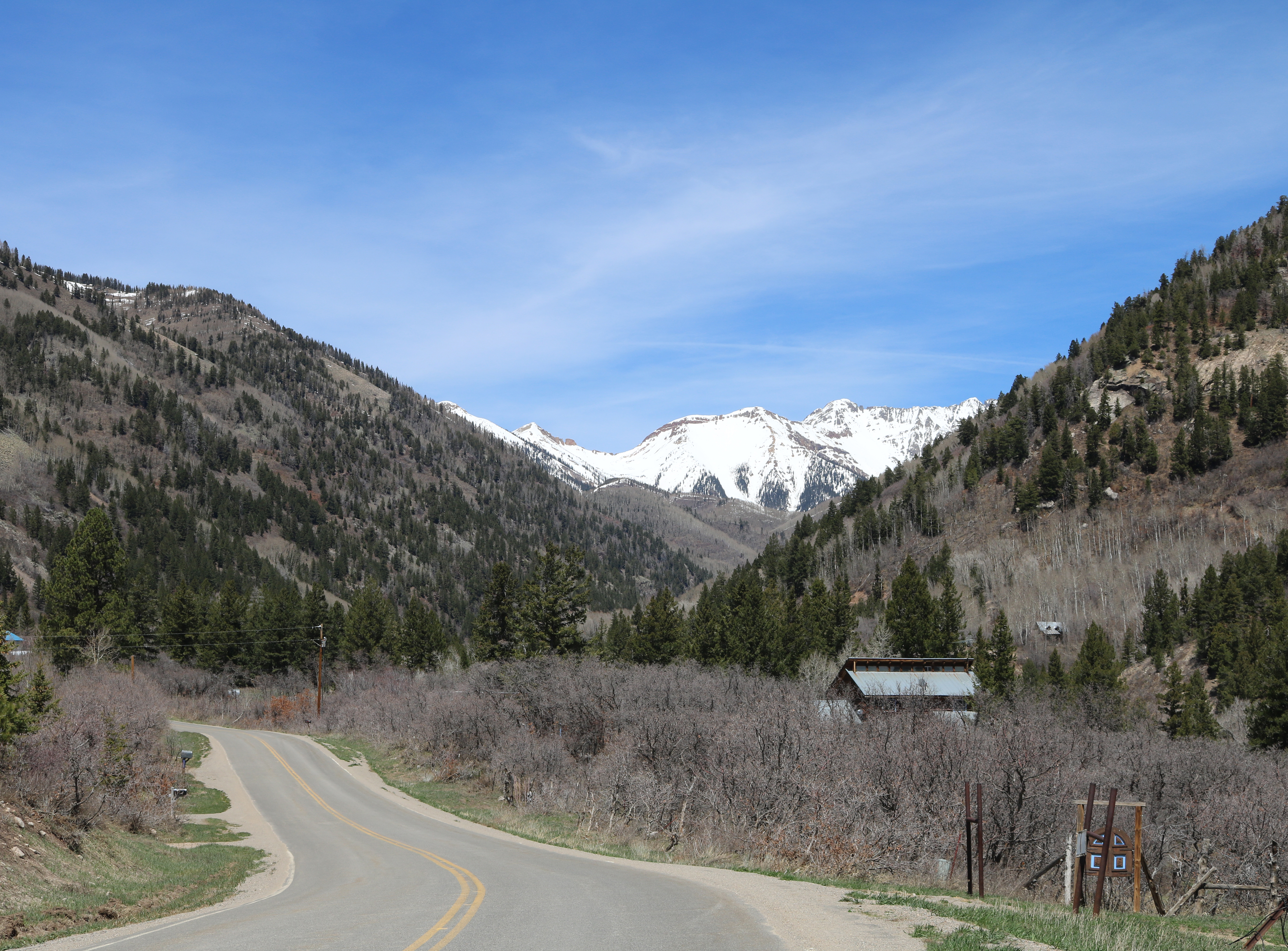
County Road 124 in Mayday and the La Plata Mountains, April 2020

Mayday is a ghost town in La Plata County, Colorado, United States. It was named for the Mayday Mine.

== History ==
The Mayday post office opened on September 4, 1913, but closed on December 31, 1914.

== Geography ==
Mayday is located at 37°21′02″N 108°04′36″W. The community lies 8,734 feet (2,662 m) above sea level.

== See also ==
- List of ghost towns in Colorado
