= Caribou, Colorado =

Ghost town in Boulder County, Colorado, USA

- ghost town
- Caribou in 2005

- Location of Caribou, Colorado. Caribou (Colorado)
- Coordinates: 39.9808°N 105.5786°W
- Country: United States
- State: Colorado
- County: Boulder
- Elevation: 9,971 ft (3,039 m)
- GNIS pop ID: 181099

Caribou is an extinct silver mining town located near Nederland in Boulder County, Colorado, United States. It was named after the nearby Caribou silver mine. The unincorporated community of Caribou City and the former Caribou Ranch recording studio are located 3.6 miles (5.8 km) east of the ghost town.

== History ==
=== 1861 to 1969 ===
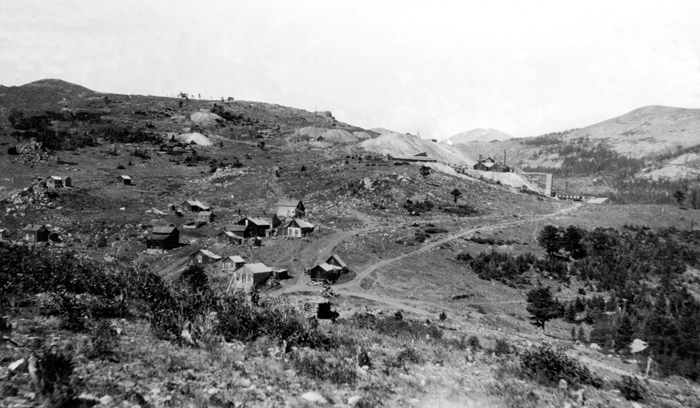
Caribou, circa 1911

A prospector named Conger discovered placer gold downstream from Caribou in 1861. He eventually followed the gold up Coon Trail Creek, and discovered the first silver vein in what later became the Caribou district.

Caribou was established about 1870 to house miners from the Caribou silver mine. The Caribou, Colorado, post office operated from January 31, 1871, until March 31, 1917. The town had one church, three saloons, a brewery, and its own newspaper, the Caribou Post. The Caribou mine was sold for $3 million in 1871 to Dutch investors, but the new owners found that the best ore had already been removed. The mine struggled until 1876, when controversial Colorado entrepreneurs Jerome B. Chaffee and David Moffat bought the mine, incorporated it, and sold shares in New York. A fire burned down the town in 1879. By the 1920s, Caribou was home to fewer than 50 people. At its peak in 1875, Caribou's population was estimated to be about 3,000 people.

Historical population
Census	Pop.	Note	%±
1880	549		—
1890	169		−69.2%
1900	44		−74.0%
1910	51		15.9%

=== 1970 to present ===
Caribou and its silver mines were completely deserted by the time 19-year-old geology student Tom Hendricks saw it in 1970, but Hendricks became convinced that the silver mines at Caribou could make a profit, and has made the mines his life work. After he got his geology degree, he acquired the old Cross mine in 1973, and began shipping silver concentrate in 1977. He acquired the famous Caribou mine in 1980. He has struggled to keep the Cross and Caribou mines operating through low silver prices. Hendricks, through Calais Resources, started exploring for gold instead of silver, but business conflicts resulting in lawsuits, specifically with former Colorado senator Tom Wiens have delayed attempts at gold mining.

== Geography ==
The Caribou townsite is located an elevation of 9,971 feet (3,039 m).

William Henry Jackson took a picture of the town in 1877, and well-known Colorado photographer John Fielder took another photograph of the same view in 1998. Only two stone ruins, and one collapsed wooden cabin remain of the town.

== See also ==
- Boulder, CO Metropolitan Statistical Area
- Front Range Urban Corridor
- List of ghost towns in Colorado
- List of populated places in Colorado
- List of post offices in Colorado
