= Buckingham, Colorado =

Abandoned town in Colorado

- Ghost town
- Location within Colorado
- Coordinates: 40°37′17.04″N 103°58′39.72″W
- Country: United States of America
- State: Colorado
- County: Weld County
- Elevation: 4,944 ft (1,507 m)

Buckingham is an extinct town located in Weld County, Colorado, United States. The townsite is located at 40°37′17″N 103°58′40″W at an elevation of 4,944 feet (1,507 m).

== History ==
The Buckingham post office operated from December 21, 1888, until July 1, 1966. The community was named after C. D. Buckingham, a railroad official.

== See also ==
- List of ghost towns in Colorado
- List of post offices in Colorado
