= Dakan, Colorado =

Ghost town in Colorado, United States

Dakan was a short-lived mining town, now a ghost town, in western Douglas County, Colorado, United States, in the Front Range of the Rocky Mountains. The Dakan post office operated from December 30, 1896, until August 2, 1898.

== History ==
The town was founded in 1896 by prospector William Wanner, who announced that he had made a shipment of ore worth $35 per ton in silver and gold from his claim, and the Castle Rock Journal declared "The future of Dakan is assured". By Christmas 1896, there were about 300 people in Dakan.

In January 1897, Dakan was described as having eight buildings, including hotel, restaurant, saloon and grocery store, and contracts for five additional buildings as soon as lumber could be delivered. But, the ore did not live up to the hopes of the prospectors and promoters. By August 1898, the post office was closed and the town disappeared.

== Geography ==
The town was said to be "in the shadow of" Dakan Mountain, which is located at 39°14′15″N 105°03′59″W.

== See also ==
- History of Colorado
- List of ghost towns in Colorado
