= Ashcroft, Colorado =

Ghost town in Pitkin County, Colorado, United States

- U.S. National Register of Historic Places
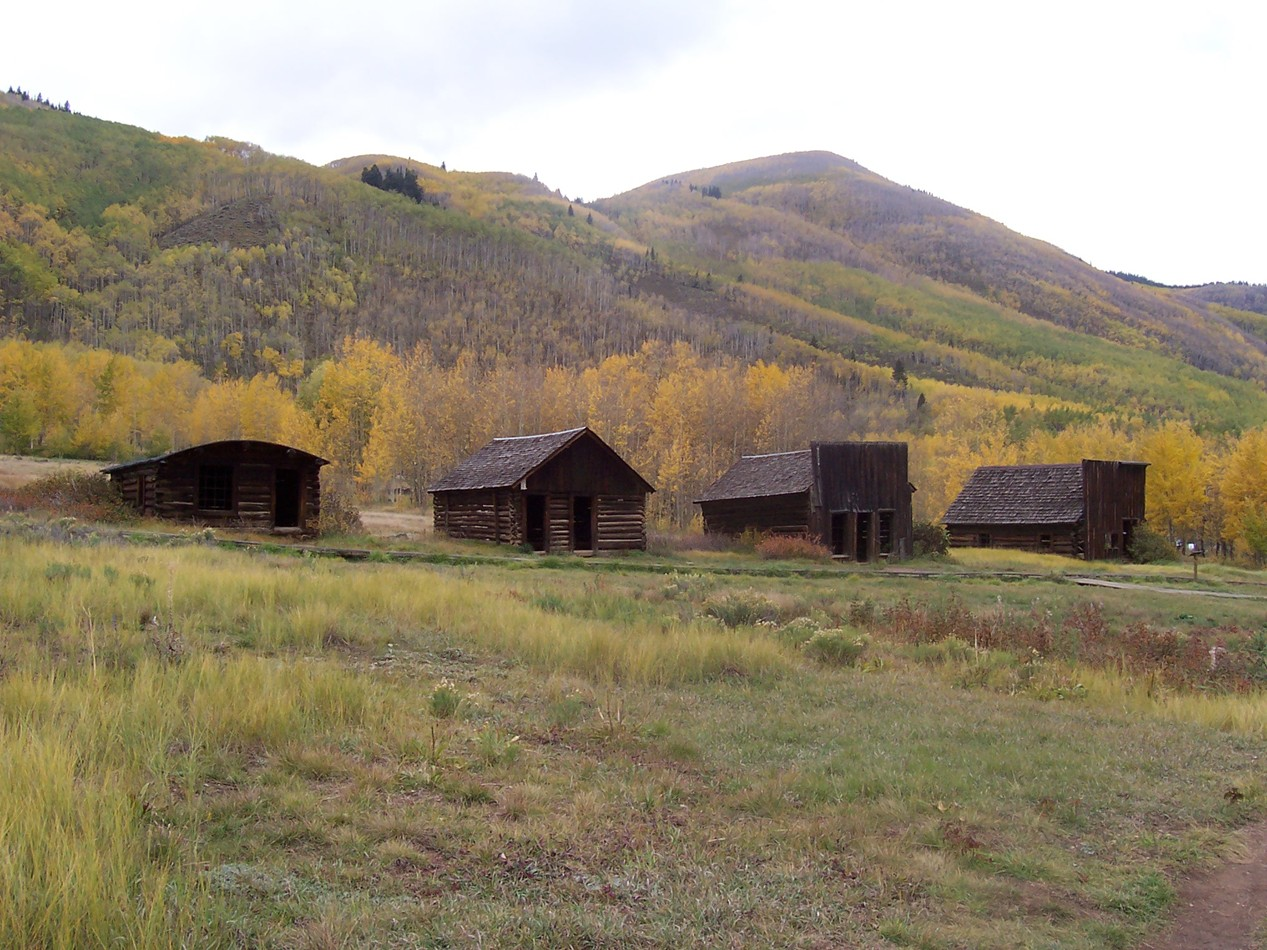
- Buildings along Ashcroft's Castle Avenue, 2007

- Location within the United States Location within Colorado
- Location: Pitkin County, Colorado, United States
- Nearest city: Aspen
- Coordinates: 39.0536°N 106.7998°W
- Area: 5 acres (2.0 ha)
- Built: 1879; 147 years ago
- NRHP reference No.: 75000533
- Added to NRHP: May 12, 1975

Ashcroft is an extinct mining town located in Pitkin County, Colorado, United States. The silver mining camp was founded as Castle Forks City in the spring of 1880. A post office named Ashcroft operated at the site from August 12, 1880, until August 5, 1881, when the name was changed to Chloride. The Chloride post office operated until January 3, 1882 when the name was changed back to Ashcroft. The renamed Ashcroft post office finally closed on November 30, 1912.

On May 12, 1975, Ashcroft was listed on the National Register of Historic Places. The townsite is located 10 miles (16 km) south of Aspen, Colorado, at an elevation of 9,521 feet (2,902 m). A few buildings remain standing as a testament to the town's past.

== History ==
=== Early years ===
In the spring of 1880 two prospectors, Charles B. Culver and W.F. Coxhead left the mining boomtown of Leadville in search of silver deposits in the Castle Creek Valley. Silver was found and Coxhead promoted their discovery with zeal back in Leadville. When he returned to "Castle Forks City", as it had been dubbed, he found that 23 other prospectors had joined "Crazy Culver." Together the men formed a Miners' Protective Association, built a courthouse and laid out the streets in Ashcroft in just two weeks. Each of their association's members paid $5, or one day's work, and $1, to draw for building lots. In all, there were 97 members in the Ashcroft Miners' Protective Association. The Ashcroft, Colorado, post office opened on August 12, 1880, but was renamed Chloride on August 5, 1881.

The name of the Chloride, Colorado, post office was changed back to Ashcroft on January 3, 1882, after a rich ore strike was uncovered in Montezuma and Tam O'Shanter Mines. The mines were partially owned by H.A.W. Tabor of Leadville mining fame. Reportedly, Tabor and his second wife visited Ashcroft in 1883 and hosted a grand ball and banquet. Tabor also reportedly bought rounds of drinks for everyone in each of the town's 13 saloons.

The same year that Tabor visited Ashcroft the town population had risen to around 2,000. Ashcroft was also home to two newspapers, a school, sawmills, a small smelter and 20 saloons. At this point in its history the town was larger than Aspen and closer to the railroad in Crested Butte.

By 1885 the town was home to between 2,000 and 3,500 people, had six hotels and 20 saloons. As quickly as the town went boom it went bust.

=== Decline ===
The silver deposits that Culver and Coxhead initially discovered produced 14,000 ounces (400 kg) of silver to the ton (44% silver by weight) at their onset. This production, however, was short-lived as the deposits were shallow. Though there were promises of a rail line to Crested Butte the promises never materialized and investors and workers were lured away to places such as Aspen. In 1884 another rich strike was discovered; this one, however, was in Aspen. This led to the end of the prosperity in Ashcroft, as people began moving to Aspen.

By 1885 there were only 100 summer residents and $5.6 in the town coffers. By the turn of the 20th century, only a handful of aging, single men lived in Ashcroft. Though they all owned mining claims they spent most of their time fishing and hunting or reading and drinking in a local bar. The men traded stories for drinks and served as an informal employment agency, matching up men with the sporadic remaining work at the mines. Every four years the remaining citizens would hold municipal elections and choose officers from amongst themselves.

The Ashcroft, Colorado, post office closed on November 20, 1912. The town's last resident, Jack Leahy, died in 1939, making Ashcroft an official ghost town.

=== Renewed interest ===
The 1930s saw a new flurry of interest in the village, with the burgeoning winter Olympics and winter sports that drew attention to Ashcroft. International sportsman Ted Ryan and his partner Billy Fiske, captain of America's gold medal Olympic bobsled team, built the Highland-Bavarian Lodge north of Ashcroft. They planned to build a European style ski resort complete with an aerial tramway leading up to Hayden Peak. World War II put an end to their plans as Fiske was killed in combat and Ryan ended up leasing Ashcroft to the U.S. Army for $1 a year.

During World War II, the Army's 10th Mountain Division used Ashcroft for mountaineering training, mostly during the summer of 1942. Following the war, most of the area's ski development occurred in Aspen and Ryan later deeded the site to the U.S. Forest Service.

In 1948, World War II veteran Stuart Mace, also a well known dog sledder, brought his family and dog sled operation to Ashcroft. In 1955, Mace and his Toklat huskies were featured in the television series Sgt. Preston of the Yukon, and the ghost town was fitted with false fronts to imitate a Canadian set for the filming of the series through 1958. Mace was given the use of 5 acres (20,000 m^{2}) of land in exchange for caretaking what remaining holdings Highland-Bavarian had in the Ashcroft area. He devoted the remainder of his life to protecting the area from development and restoring the ecology. He was joined in that effort in 1974 by the Aspen Historical Society, which helped Ashcroft make it to the National Register of Historic Places in 1975.

== See also ==
- List of ghost towns in Colorado
