= Tioga, Colorado =

Ghost town in Huerfano County, Colorado, United States

Coordinates: 37°41′56″N 104°55′39″W

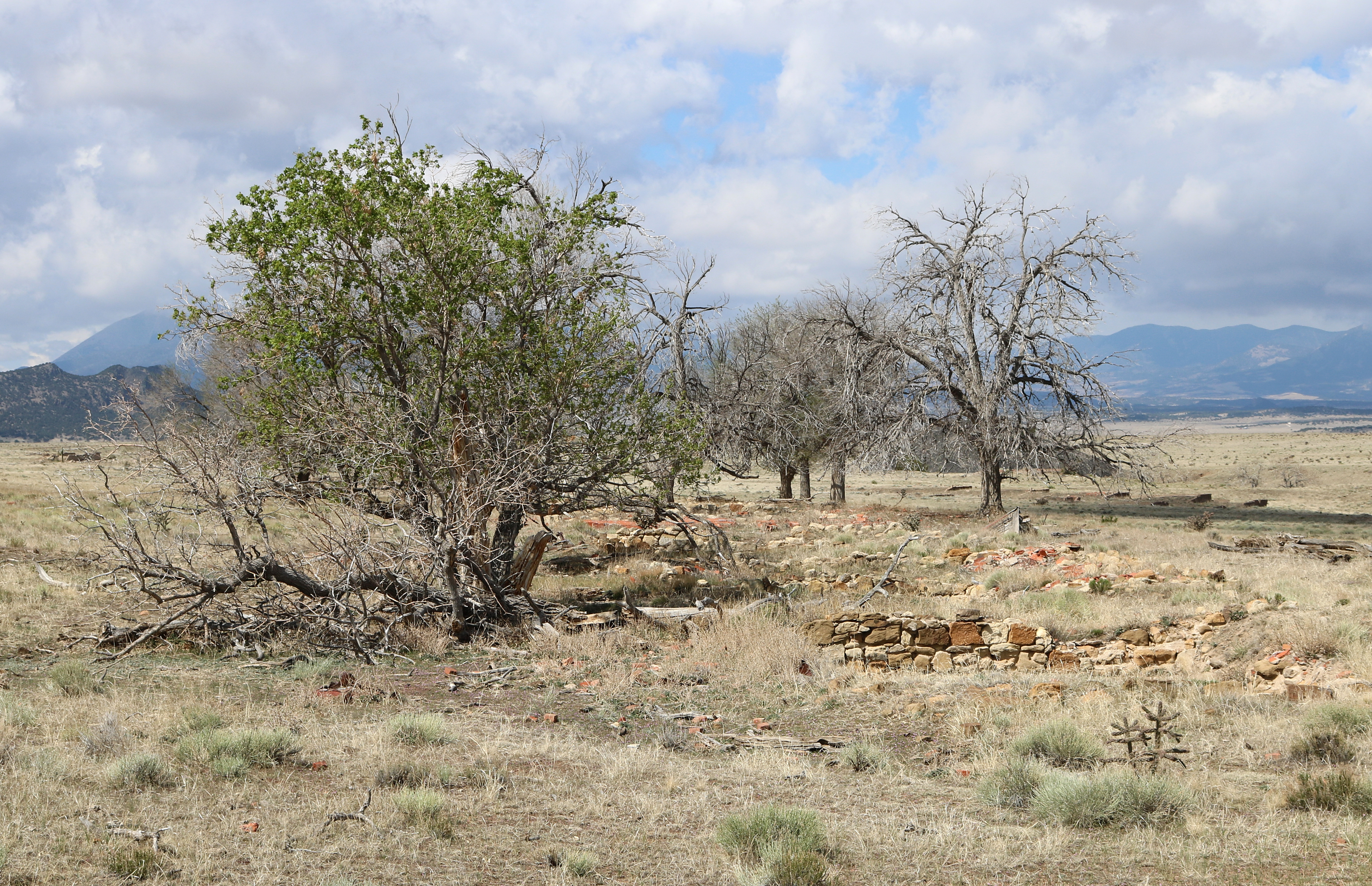
Tioga in 2018; no standing structures remain, only foundations.

Tioga is an extinct town in Huerfano County, in the U.S. state of Colorado. The GNIS classifies it as a populated place.

== Description ==
A post office called Tioga was established in 1907, and remained in operation until 1954. Tioga is a name derived from a Native American language meaning "where it forks".

== See also ==
- List of ghost towns in Colorado
