= Fulford, Colorado =

- Census-designated place
- Location of the Fulford CDP in Eagle County, Colorado
- Coordinates: 39°31′00″N 106°39′27″W
- Country: United States
- State: Colorado
- County: Eagle County

Government
  - Type: Unincorporated community

Area
  - Total: 0.222 sq mi (0.576 km^{2})
  - Land: 0.222 sq mi (0.575 km^{2})
  - Water: 0.00019 sq mi (0.0005 km^{2})
- Elevation: 9,813 ft (2,991 m)

Population (2020)
  - Total: 0
  - Density: 0.0/sq mi (0.0/km^{2})
- Time zone: UTC-7 (MST)
  - Summer (DST): UTC-6 (MDT)
- ZIP Code: Edwards 81632
- Area code: 970
- GNIS feature: 2583237

Fulford is an extinct town and a census-designated place (CDP) located in Eagle County, Colorado, United States. The population of the Fulford CDP was 0 at the United States Census 2020. The CDP is a part of the Edwards, CO Micropolitan Statistical Area. The Fulford post office operated from February 5, 1892, until May 15, 1910. The Edwards post office (Zip Code 81632) now serves the area.

== History ==
Fulford is named for Arthur H. Fulford, an early settler.

== Geography ==
The Fulford CDP has an area of 142 acres (0.576 km^{2}), including 0.12 acres (0.0005 km^{2}) of water.

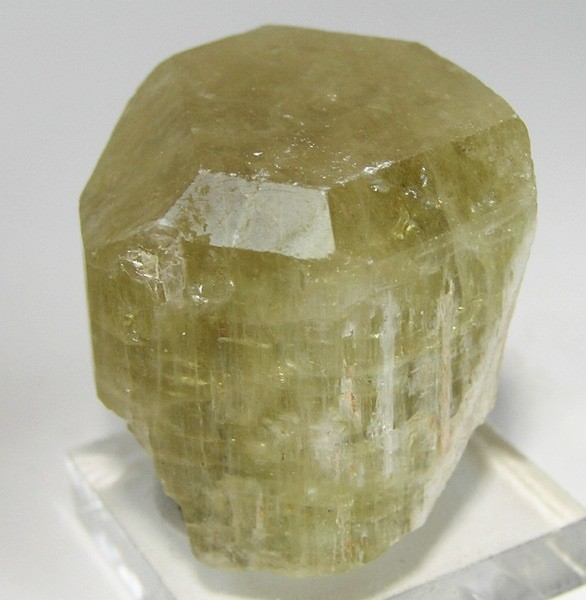
Apatite crystal from the Crystal Lode pegmatite of the Fulford Mining District

== Demographics ==
The United States Census Bureau initially defined the Fulford CDP for the United States Census 2010.

Fulford CDP, Colorado
Year	Pop.	±%
2010	2	—
2020	0	−100.0%
Source: United States Census Bureau

== Education ==
It is in the Eagle County School District RE 50.

== See also ==
- List of ghost towns in Colorado
