= Lenado, Colorado =

Coordinates: 39°14′33″N 106°45′45″W

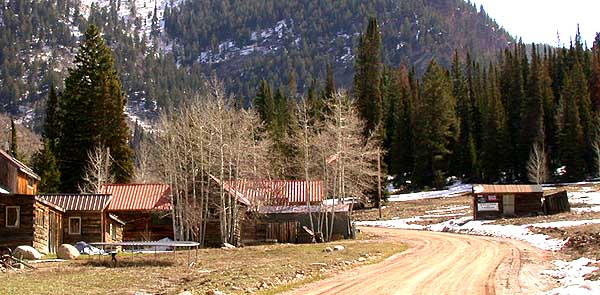
View of the historic mining camp of Lenado, Colorado, looking eastward

Lenado, Colorado, elevation 8,540 feet (2,603 m), is a ghost town in Pitkin County, Colorado near Woody Creek along Woody Creek Road. Its main period of activity was in the late 19th century, due to the local lead and zinc deposits, during which time it was home to ca. 300 people. Following a slump in lead prices, the town became abandoned soon later, notwithstanding a brief surge in activity after 1917 due to a zinc shortage brought on by the First World War.

In the mid-1960s and early 1970s Lenado was resurrected into a logging community and lumber mill which was home to about 100 people working and living there for 15 years.

== See also ==
- List of ghost towns in Colorado
