= Able, Colorado =

Ghost town in Bent County, Colorado, United States

- Ghost town
- Location within the United States Location within Colorado
- Coordinates: 38°03′38″N 102°52′11″W
- Country: United States
- State: Colorado
- County: Bent

Government
  - Body: Bent County
- Elevation: 3,783 ft (1,153 m)
- Time zone: UTC−7 (MST)
  - Summer (DST): UTC−6 (MDT)
- Area code: 719
- GNIS pop ID: 195556

Able is an extinct town located in Bent County, Colorado, United States.

== History ==
Able was founded around 1924 at the site once also known as the "Martin" railroad stop. Able never had a post office.

== See also ==
- List of ghost towns in Colorado
