= Bloom, Colorado =

Ghost town in Otero County, Colorado, United States

- Ghost town
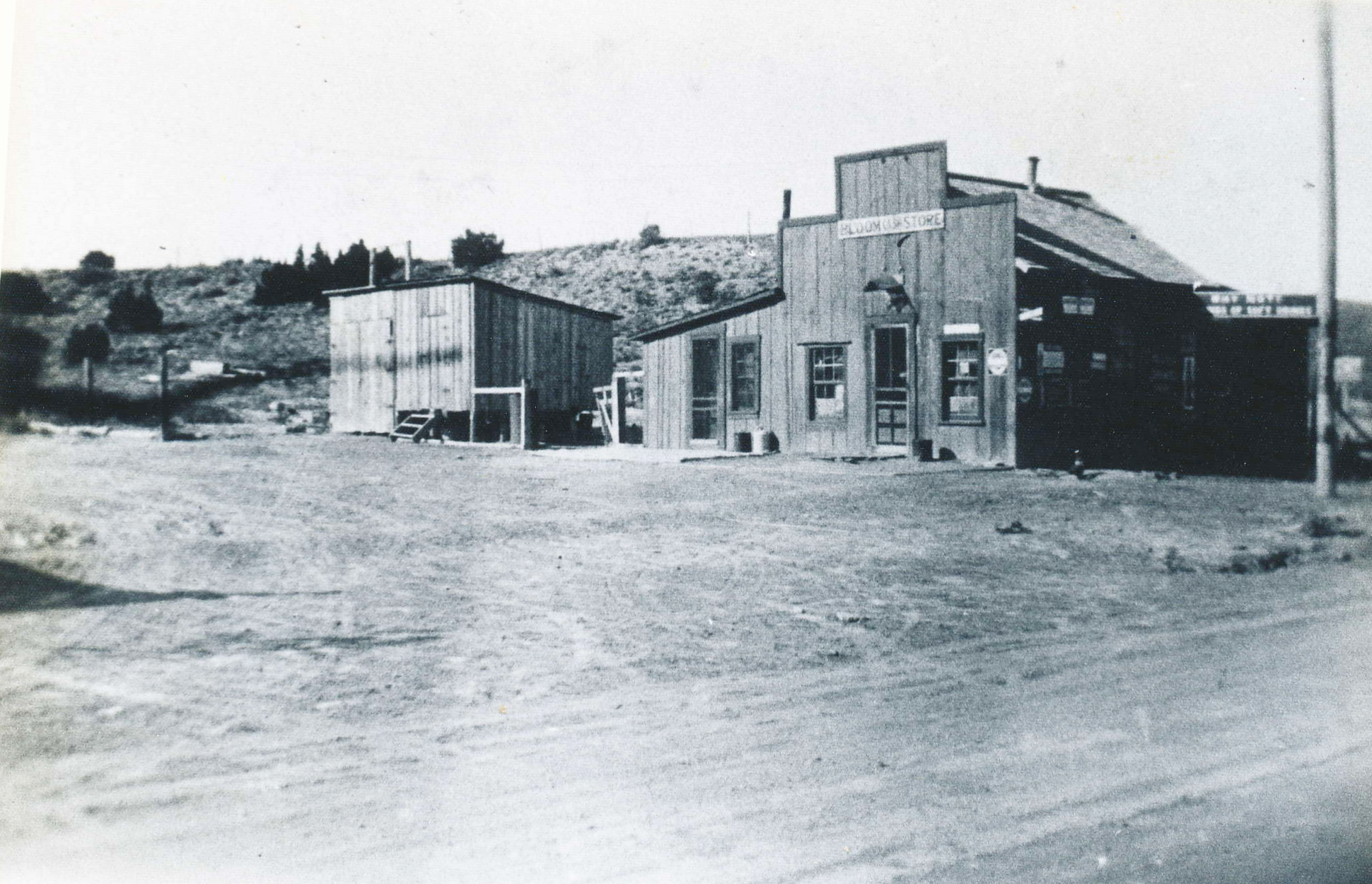
- General Store in Bloom, July 1921

- Location of Bloom, Colorado. Bloom (Colorado)
- Coordinates: 37°41′15″N 103°57′24″W
- Country: United States
- State: Colorado
- County: Otero
- Elevation: 4,800 ft (1,500 m)
- Time zone: UTC−07:00 (MST)
  - Summer (DST): UTC−06:00 (MDT)
- GNIS pop ID: 195786

Bloom is an extinct town located in Otero County, Colorado, United States.

== History ==
Bloom was originally known as Iron Spring. The Bloom, Colorado, post office operated from April 18, 1899, until May 31, 1938. The community was named after Frank G. Bloom, a cattleman.

== See also ==
- List of ghost towns in Colorado
