= Alta, Colorado =

Ghost town in the San Juan Mountains of Colorado

Alta
- Ghost town
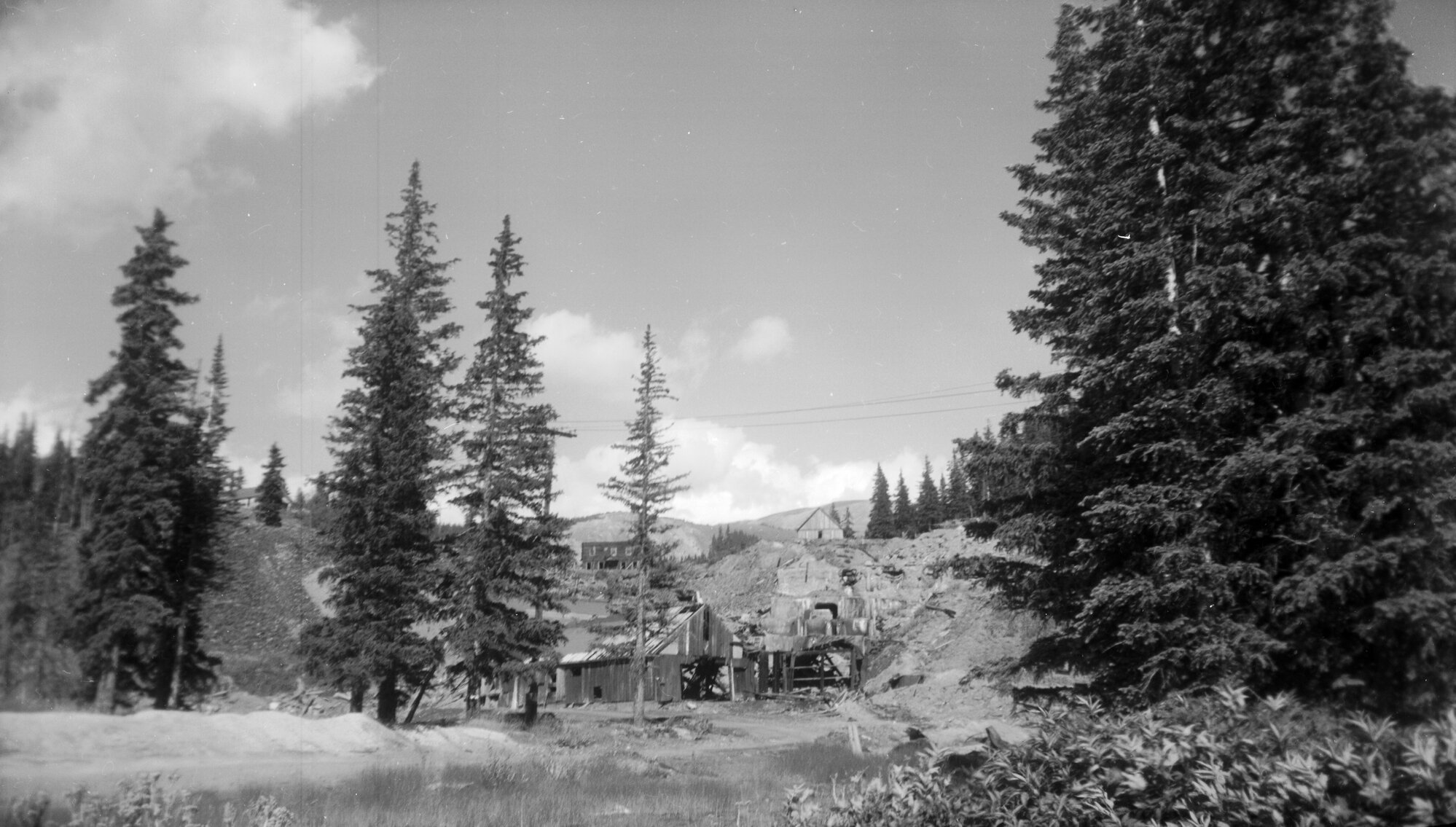
- Mine ruins in Alta, Colorado 1964
- Interactive map of Alta
- Coordinates: 37.88583°N 107.85167°W
- Country: United States
- State: Colorado
- County: San Miguel
- Founded: 1877
- Elevation: 11,800.0 ft (3,596.6 m)

Population
  - Total: 0
- Time zone: MST

Alta is a historical ghost town located in San Miguel County, Colorado, United States. Alta was established in 1877 as a mining settlement, and became an important site for gold and silver extraction during the Colorado Silver Boom. The site is notable for being one of the earliest places in the world to use Nikola Tesla's AC transmission system to power mills in its area. Alta was abandoned in 1948 when a fire engulfed the mine complex and ceased its function as an active mining site.

== Location and geography ==
Alta is situated at 37.88583°N 107.85167°W between Silver Mountain and Bald Mountain, on the Turkey Creek Mesa, 14 miles (23 km) south of Telluride on the eastern edge of the San Juan Mountain Range. The ghost town is at an altitude of 11,800 feet (3,600 m), making it one of the higher historical settlement areas in the region. The abandoned town site is located on private land, however, it is predominantly surrounded by public land managed by the United States Forest Service.

The original access point to the Alta Mine is via the Black Hawk Tunnel situated at 37.885°N 107.85280°W. This tunnel was blocked off following the site's abandonment. A second access point to the Alta Mine is via the Gold King Basin, approximately 1 mile (1.6 km) southwest of the town site.

== History ==
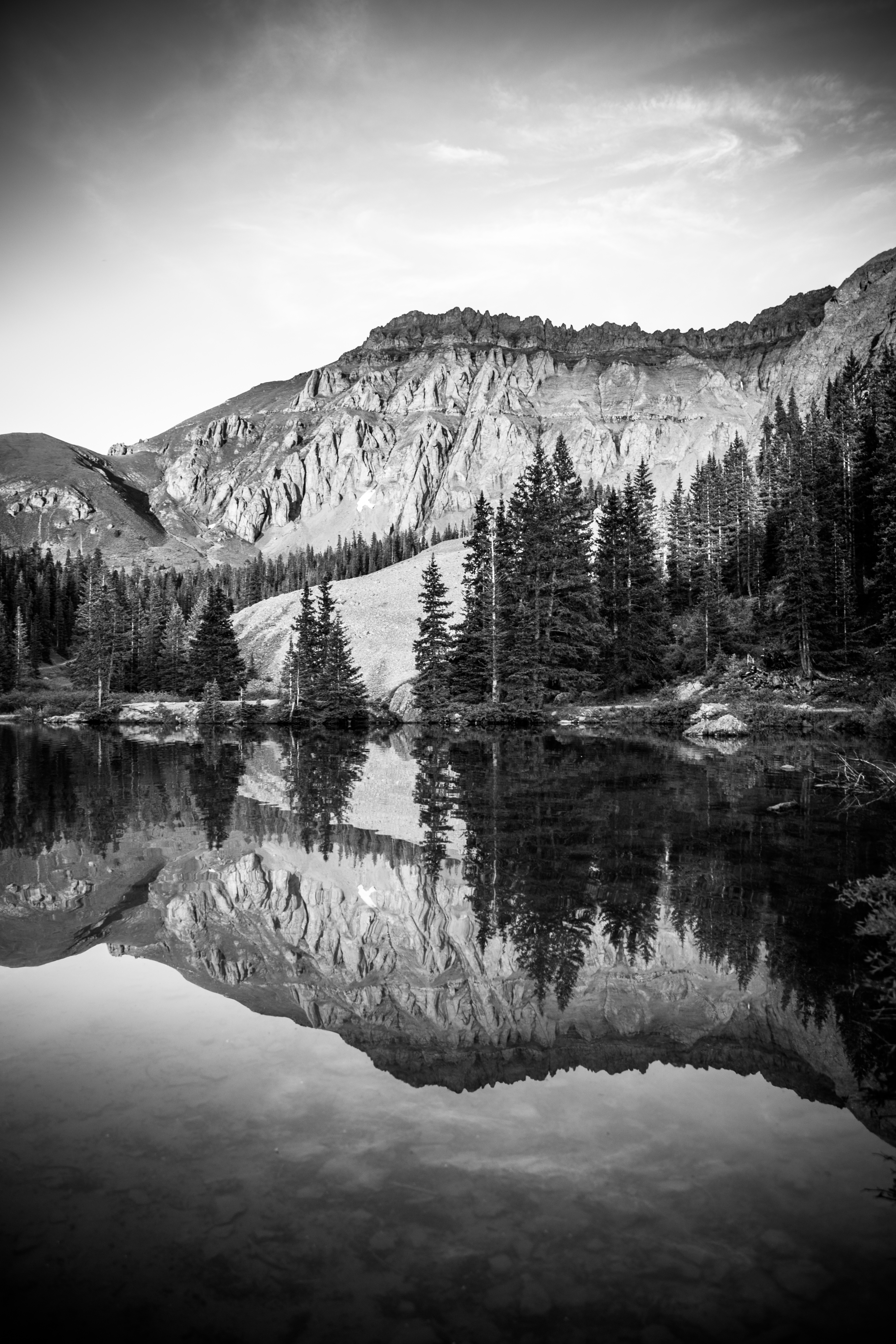
Alta Lakes,1 mile away from the ghost town, 2014

=== Early years: 1877–1899 ===
Alta and the adjacent Alta Mine were established in the late 19th century, after the discovery of a large gold vein in the Gold King Basin by Pat Cullen, Frank Dimick, and Thomas Knott on July 25 of that year. The discovery initiated mining operations and influenced economic growth in Alta and the surrounding area. Although Alta had full-time residents, it never officially gained town status and was considered a mining camp during its years of operation.

By 1879, the development of ore extraction in the region had grown enough for the Gold King Company to build a 20-stamp mill near Ophir where two arrastres were in operation.

=== Development and expansion: 1900–1947 ===
After the initial establishment of the mining settlement, the mining claim traded hands multiple times between different lessees until 1908, when John Wagner acquired the property of the Alta Mining Co. and during the next few years the adjoining claims. In 1910 the tramline to Ophir was built, allowing more efficient transportation of ore to railroads and decreased dependency on transportation of ore via mules.

During a series of mining booms, the town site was expanded by different mining companies. At its peak, it contained numerous houses, a school, a mill, and a boarding house. It also included a community center that served as a meeting place for the inhabitants. During this period the Alta mine produced more than $5 million in ore.

=== Decline and abandonment: 1948 ===
In 1948, a fire ignited in a snow shed between the Black Hawk tunnel and the mill. Three miners were trapped by a collapsed tunnel but eventually made their way to safety through an abandoned portal. The fire ended the mining operations in Alta and led to the subsequent abandonment. As a result, the mining operations were halted and no longer functional.

=== Legacy ===
Remnants of the mining infrastructure, including tram towers, power plant ruins, and mill foundations, provide insights into early 20th-century mining methods in Colorado. Several historic structures survive at the townsite, including the former boarding house, the mine manager's residence with its distinctive bay window, and several wooden bungalows retaining traces of their original green-and-white paint.

== Notable structures ==
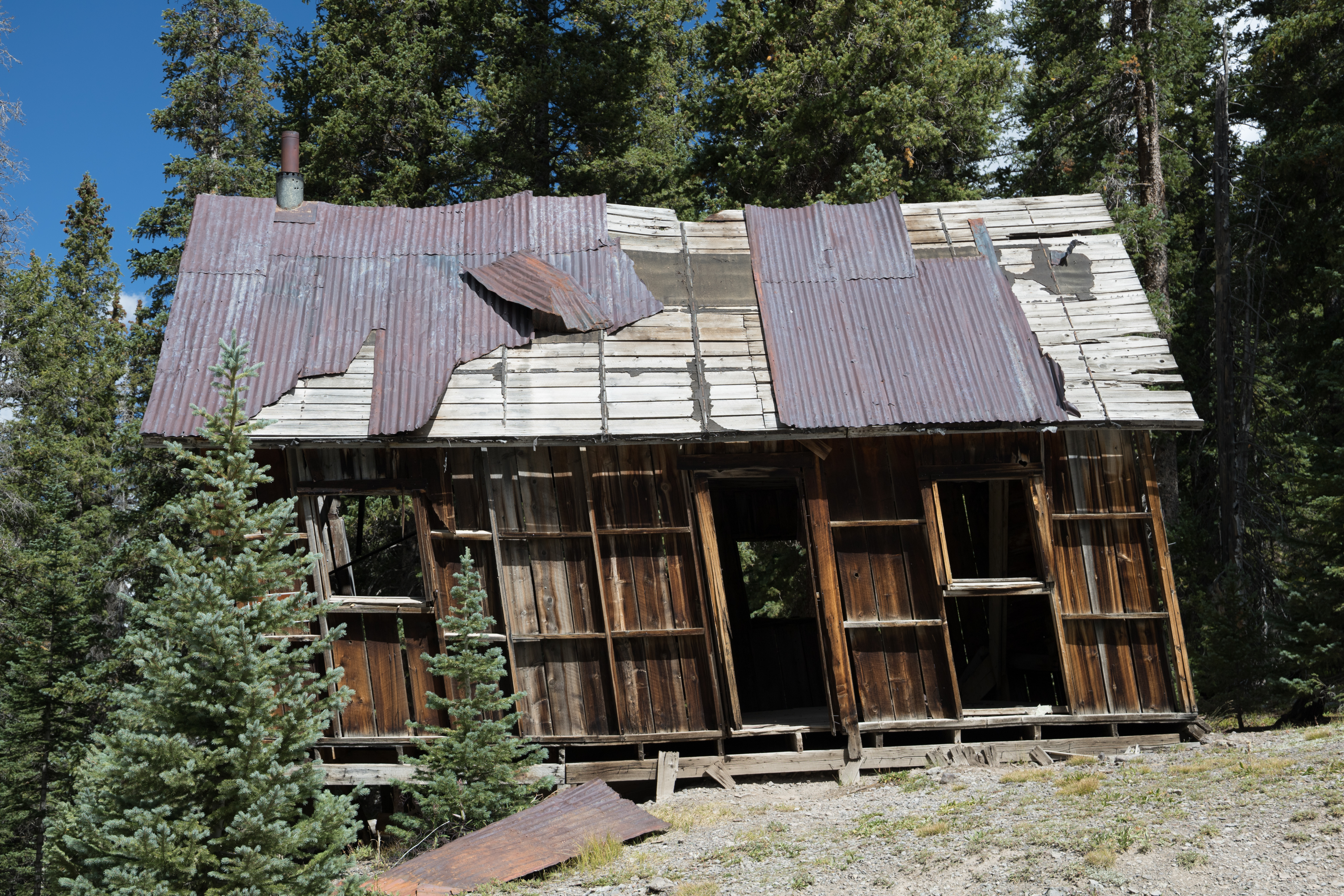
Abandoned building in Alta ghost town in 2021

Alta contains the remains of original buildings and structures, including the mine entrances, cabins, and commercial properties. There also remains a reservoir, originally used to support the community and the mining operations. The settlement includes the remains of abandoned commercial buildings and miners' cabins. Many buildings in Alta have weathered and crumbled over time, leaving only a general view of the landscape.

Name of the Buildings	Purpose	Approx. Year Built/ Used
Two-story Boarding House (Alta boarding house)	Provided housing and meals for miners and transient workers.	Rebuilt around 1939
Miner Cabins/ Dwellings	Small homes for miners and their families; most built of local timber and now are weathered.	Late 1800s - early 1900s
Outhouse Buildings	Smaller ancillary buildings like outhouses and utility-buildings are still extant, providing additional historical context of the mining layout.	Unknown
Offices/ General Store/ School Building (site features)	The mining town included an office building, general store, school and recreation hall in its heyday. Some specific buildings are now in ruins and their original names and functions unclear	Active in its heyday
Aerial Tramway to Mill	Part of the main mining infrastructure, including a two-mile aerial tramway built in 1909 to carry ore concentrate from the Bessie mill to the Rio Grande Southern Railroad station at Ophir Loop.	Built in 1909

== Mining ==
The Alta Mine, located in San Miguel County, Colorado, operated at an elevation of 11,086 feet and was the center of mining activity in Alta. The Alta Mine primarily produced gold, along with smaller quantities of silver, copper, and lead as byproducts. Mining operations at Alta benefited from both underground tunnels and surface excavations to access the Alta and St. Louis ore veins. To process the extracted ore, miners relied on stamp mills, which crushed the rock to release the minerals. Alta developed as a company town site serving the Gold King Mine, which was discovered in 1878 and continued to operate into the 1940s. Ore from the Gold King and nearby Alta was transported downhill to Ophir by aerial tram cars, connecting the high-elevation camp to regional smelting and rail connections.

=== Mining technology ===
- A hydroelectric power plant supplied alternating current (AC) electricity to operate mills and other equipment at high capacity, making it one of the earliest in the United States to adopt electricity for powering machinery.
- Aerial tramways and pipelines were constructed to transport ore and water across steep terrain, connecting the high-elevation operations to local processing sites.
- Early use of flotation technology at mills such as the Belmont-Wagner Mill, were designed to separate valuable minerals from ore more effectively, although some mills were not entirely successful.
- L. L. Nunn and Otto Mears modernized mining operations in the San Miguel Valley by providing high-voltage alternating current (AC) from the Ames Power Plant, allowing mills to operate efficiently and low-grade ore to be processed profitably. Nunn recruited engineers and students to operate and maintain the equipment, while Mears built roads and the Rio Grande Southern Railroad to transport ore and supplies to and from the mines.
- In later years, the Alta properties were consolidated under the Silver Mountain Mining Company, although large-scale extraction had ceased for decades by the mid-twentieth century.

=== Geology and ore controls ===
The Alta mining district lies within the San Juan volcanic field, where ore deposits follow northwest and northeast trending fractures and dikes. The principal veins: Alta, Palmyra, St. Louis, and Hancock dip steeply northeast and contain quartz, barite, galena, sphalerite, chalcopyrite, and tetrahedrite, often set in a rhodochrosite gangue.

Mineralization occurred in several stages, beginning with pyrite and calcite, followed by quartz–barite–sulfide veins and later gold-bearing quartz. Oxidation near the surface increased gold content, while deeper ore zones contained more zinc. The host rocks include the San Juan breccia, Telluride Formation, and Cutler Formation, where recurrent faulting reopened earlier fractures, allowing multiple episodes of mineral deposition.

== Climate ==
Located at an elevation of approximately 11,800 feet (3,600 m) in the San Juan Mountains of Colorado, Alta has a cold-winter, mild-summer subalpine climate. The town's high elevation results in long, harsh winters marked by heavy snowfall, freezing temperatures, and frequent strong winds. Winter conditions often extend into the spring, producing a prolonged snow season that supports various winter recreational activities. Summers in Alta are short and generally cool, with mild daytime temperatures and chilly evenings.

Precipitation occurs throughout the year, with most falling as snow during late autumn, winter, and early spring, while rain showers are more common during the short summer period. The combination of high altitude, abundant snowfall, and cool temperatures shapes the town's natural environment, affecting local flora and fauna as well as tourism and outdoor recreation.

The following table shows approximate monthly normals for Alta, Colorado, estimated by applying a standard lapse rate (−3.6 °F per 1,000 ft) to NOAA/NCEI 2000–2025 normals for the nearest long-term station (Telluride 4WNW, USC00058204; elev. 8,646 ft). Alta's elevation (Alta Lakes SNOTEL ≈ 11,290 ft) is roughly 2,644 ft higher, so temperatures shown below are adjusted downward; precipitation and snowfall are given from the NOAA station normals as a baseline. Alta likely receives more snow.

Climate data for Alta, Colorado (approx.; lapse-rate adjusted from Telluride 4WNW)
Month	Jan	Feb	Mar	Apr	May	Jun	Jul	Aug	Sep	Oct	Nov	Dec	Year
Mean daily maximum °F (°C)	26.7 (−2.9)	28.1 (−2.2)	35.2 (1.8)	42.5 (5.8)	51.3 (10.7)	63.5 (17.5)	67.2 (19.6)	64.6 (18.1)	58.5 (14.7)	48.3 (9.1)	35.9 (2.2)	26.7 (−2.9)	45.7 (7.6)
Daily mean °F (°C)	8.7 (−12.9)	12.0 (−11.1)	21.5 (−5.8)	29.0 (−1.7)	36.9 (2.7)	46.0 (7.8)	49.2 (9.6)	47.7 (8.7)	41.3 (5.2)	32.9 (0.5)	19.5 (−6.9)	9.5 (−12.5)	29.5 (−1.4)
Mean daily minimum °F (°C)	−9.2 (−22.9)	−4.2 (−20.1)	7.5 (−13.6)	15.5 (−9.2)	22.5 (−5.3)	28.5 (−1.9)	31.2 (−0.4)	30.7 (−0.7)	24.1 (−4.4)	17.5 (−8.1)	3.1 (−16.1)	−7.7 (−22.1)	13.3 (−10.4)
Average precipitation inches (mm)	1.45 (37)	1.38 (35)	1.61 (41)	1.71 (43)	1.60 (41)	0.85 (22)	2.37 (60)	2.60 (66)	2.34 (59)	1.56 (40)	1.53 (39)	1.37 (35)	20.37 (518)
Average snowfall inches (cm)	23.6 (60)	22.0 (56)	22.7 (58)	13.1 (33)	5.1 (13)	0.3 (0.76)	0.0 (0.0)	0.0 (0.0)	0.7 (1.8)	5.3 (13)	18.7 (47)	19.3 (49)	130.8 (331.56)
Source: "Summary of Monthly Normals (1991–2020) — TELLURIDE 4WNW, CO (USC00058204)". NOAA/NCEI.

== Tourism ==
Access to Alta is unrestricted, and the surrounding area remains open to the public year-round. While the settlement itself lies on private land, the broader area including roads and nearby recreational spaces are situated on public land and can be visited at any time.

Alta Lakes consists of three high-alpine lakes located approximately .5 miles (800 m) meters east of the settlement, in a basin north of the Gold King Basin. The area includes designated dispersed camping sites and is used for non-motorized water activities like paddleboarding, and kayaking. On the third private lake, sits the Alta Lakes Observatory, which is available for overnight rental. During winter, Alta Lakes is used as a destination for backcountry skiing, snowmobiling, and snowshoeing.

The campground is managed with an emphasis on preserving the natural setting and minimizing human impact, making it a popular location for dispersed-style camping within a structured area. Popular activities in the area include hiking, fishing, photography, and wildlife observation, with easy access to nearby trails and alpine lakes.[15]

== See also ==
- List of ghost towns in Colorado
- Colorado mining timeline
- Gold mining in Colorado
- Silver mining in Colorado
- History of Colorado
