= Gwillimsville, Colorado =

Coordinates: 39.100°N 104.774°W

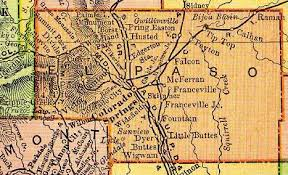
Early El Paso County Colorado map. Gwillimville was six miles east of Monument in northern El Paso County

Gwillimsille was a settlement at the head of Cherry Creek and six miles east of Monument in northern El Paso County, Colorado. Its settlers were engaged in dairy, ranching, and timber businesses. The Gwillimville post office operated from April 18, 1878, until September 25, 1890.

== See also ==
- List of ghost towns in Colorado
