= Husted, Colorado =

Coordinates: 38.991°N 104.833°W

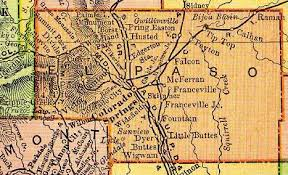
Early El Paso County Colorado map. Husted was between Monument and Colorado Springs, Colorado and its site is now in the northern portion of the Air Force Academy.

Husted is an extinct town located in El Paso County, Colorado, United States. Husted was a settlement on the Denver and Rio Grande Western Railroad and located 13 mi (21 km) north of Colorado Springs. Residents were involved in ranching and lumber businesses. The Husted post office operated from October 1, 1878, until October 15 1920.

== See also ==
- List of ghost towns in Colorado
