= Poudre City, Colorado =

Ghost town in Colorado, United States

Coordinates: 40°41′54.3″N 105°37′28.9″W

Poudre City is a ghost town located in the foothills of the Rocky Mountains in northwestern Larimer County, Colorado, United States. The town was founded in 1890 around a gold reducing stamp mill. The town was destroyed on June 10, 1891 when the Chambers Lake dam burst and swept down the Poudre Canyon. All that remains of the town today is the chimney from the stamp mill.

== History ==
In the late 1800s, it was suspected that there was gold in Larimer County and in the hills of the Poudre Canyon and many prospectors moved to the area. John Zimmerman built a 5 stamp gold reducing stamp mill in 1890 to process the ore being brought out of the area. A saloon, general store, hotel and houses sprouted in the area surrounding the mill.

Shortly after the mill's construction, it was determined that the ore bore very little gold, and Zimmerman sold it to pursue other endeavors in the area.

In 1891, Zimmerman inspected the dam at Chamber's Lake and had determined it was severely undersized and likely to give way. He had corresponded with the Larimer County Ditch Company, the owner of the lake, and even had hosted the company's Chief Engineer, William Rist, but the dam was not corrected. On the morning of June 10, 1891, the dam gave way. Poudre City, being on the banks of the Poudre River, and directly downstream of Chamber's Lake was in a very vulnerable position. Zimmerman had been out working the fields some 3 1/2 miles (5.6 km) upstream that morning and heard the tell tale sounds of water rushing down the canyon. He rode into town to warn the residents to move to higher ground. The flood waters destroyed the entire town and left nothing behind, save for the chimney of the stamp mill, which survives to this day.

In 1973, the Colorado State Historical Society placed a plaque at the base of the mill.
