= Swallows, Colorado =

Coordinates: 38°18′08″N 104°51′37″W

Swallows is an extinct town in Pueblo County, in the U.S. state of Colorado. The GNIS classifies it as a populated place.

A post office called Swallows was established in 1892, and remained in operation until 1947. The community was named for the swallows which nested near the original town site.
