= Tuttle, Colorado =

Pony Express Post Office town in Colorado

Coordinates: 39.497°N 102.510°W

Tuttle, Colorado was a US Post Office for the local Pony Express founded in the late 1800s. At its peak Tuttle housed between 70 and 80 residents. As the Pony Express fell out of use, the last few residents either moved, or grew old and died. In a 1900 census of Kit Carson County, Tuttle had a population of about 15, including a blacksmith, postmaster, a photographer, and a novelist. The last resident of Tuttle died in 1914. All that remains of this small town are some foundations of the old buildings, the ruins of the local Lutheran Church, and the all but collapsed remains of the Post Office. Tuttle is located north-east of Stratton, off of Hwy. 57.
