= Tungsten, Colorado =

Ghost town in Boulder County, Colorado

Tungsten
- Ghost town
- Location within the state of Colorado
- Coordinates: 39°58′19″N 105°28′34″W
- Country: United States
- State: Colorado
- County: Boulder
- Elevation: 7,995 ft (2,437 m)

Population (2010)
  - Total: 0
- Time zone: UTC-7 (Mountain (MST))
  - Summer (DST): UTC-6 (MDT)
- GNIS feature ID: 181150

Tungsten is a ghost town in Boulder County, in the U.S. state of Colorado. The former townsite is north of Middle Boulder Creek.

== History ==
A post office called Tungsten was established in 1916, and remained in operation until 1950. The community took its name from a nearby tungsten mine. Facts–such as the population, precise location, and descriptions of the town–are disputed as one frequently quoted book on the subject, Colorado Ghost Towns (1959), is inconsistent with contemporary news reports on the town. In 1916, 600 people are reported to have lived in the town.
