= San Juan City, Colorado =

San Juan City
- Extinct settlement
- Now Freemon's Guest Ranch (Note: San Juan City is not in the GNIS database. The coordinates are for Freemon's Guest Ranch or Store.)
- Coordinates: 37°45′57″N 107°6′44″W
- Country: United States
- State: Colorado
- County: Mineral
- Nearest town: Creede

San Juan City was designated the county seat of Hinsdale County, Colorado when the county was established on February 10, 1874. On February 23, 1875, voters decided to move the county seat to Lake City. The town began as a mining camp, with the goal to become a hub for transportation of supplies to area mines. After a year as the county seat, it became a stage stop, offering food and lodging. It operated as a stage stop, post office, and roadhouse into the 1880s. In 1893, San Juan City became part of Mineral County, Colorado. A post office operated out of San Juan City, off and on, until 1923. The town's site, located along Clear Creek, is now Freemon's Guest Ranch. San Juan Ranch is also said to be the former site of San Juan City, but the former Galloway's transportation hub that became San Juan Ranch was located a few miles away from the town.

== Mining camp and stage station ==
Before it was named a county seat, a settler named Franklin platted the town of San Juan City. The first cabin, built by Capt. W. H. Green, was the courthouse for the county until voters elected to move the county seat to Lake City. From 1874 to 1876, San Juan City had one merchant in a log cabin who operated mail service that was transported twice a week on a passenger and mail stage on the Alamosa to Silverton stage road. It was the county's first post office. The town began as a mining camp, and operated as such into the 1870s. Town occupants intended San Juan City to be a supply town for miners, but most of the residents moved away from the town after Lake City was established. In 1875, a stone hotel, restaurant, and post office was established by Ada (Dollie, Dolly) and Clarence Brooks. At that time, there were abandoned log cabins in the town. Dolly ran the roadhouse, stage stop, and post office after she and Clarence divorced in the 1880s.

External image
- Early travelers on the Barlow and Sanderson Stage Route

Barlow and Sanderson Stage lines operated a stage line to San Juan City, transporting freight to the town. From there, freight was transported to remote areas across toll roads on the backs of pack animals. The freight business operated until 1882 when the Denver and Rio Grande Western Railroad made the stage line obsolete. By 1884, the roadhouse was called Texas Club, and later Freemon's Guest Ranch. After September 1887, Dolly was no longer in the area, either because she left the area or died.

The post office was moved three miles to Galloway's in 1877. San Juan City had a post office intermittently until 1923. In 1893, San Juan City became part of Mineral County, Colorado.

== Ranch ==
Two places have been identified as the site of the former San Juan City. The key distinction appears to be the different neighboring creeks and the distance from Creede.

San Juan City has been reported to be approximately 20 miles (32 km) from Creede near the headwaters of the Rio Grande at the mouth of Clear Creek. A map in Roadside history of Colorado shows it west of Creede. The two ranches are Freemon's Guest Ranch and San Juan Ranch, both sites were stops on the Barlow and Sanderson Stagecoach Line that operated between Del Norte, Lake City, and Silverton.

According to Haunted Creede:

- One of the stops was at "San Juan City (currently Freemon's Ranch)", which offered food and lodging. The Brooks roadhouse building is still located in Freemon's Ranch and used as a ranch house.
- A second stop a few miles down the road at Galloway's (currently San Juan Ranch) was a stop for handling stock and freight. James Galloway operated a transportation hub beginning in 1876.

Both stops were considered part of Antelope Park.

=== Freemon's Guest Ranch (formerly San Juan City) ===
External image
- Freemon's Guest Ranch

San Juan City is now Freemon's Guest Ranch, which is 17 miles (27 km) from Creede and alongside Clear Creek, east of the confluence with the Rio Grande. (Note: The source says that "San Juan City was located... near the confluence of Crooked Creek and the Rio Grande", but according to Google maps Freemon's Guest Ranch is alongside Clear Creek and near where it flows into the Rio Grande.) It was purchased by Ken Ellison in 1968.

=== San Juan Ranch (formerly Galloways) ===
San Juan Ranch, a private property on US Forest Road 520, is located just west of Colorado Highway 149. San Juan Ranch is 21.2 miles from Creede on Colorado Highway 149 and just north of Crooked Creek a bit further north of the Rio Grande. (Note: In the description of the San Juan Ranch site, in 1905, the site was purchased by the Officer family, who operated a resort and cattle ranch on the land. The Officer family sold the property in 1960. (Note: A source states that log cabin from the original town sits on San Juan Ranch, but that may be due to the confusion of the San Juan City and Galloway sites. Eberhart states that there are no remnants of the town remaining at the site of the former San Juan City.))
