= List of populated places in Colorado by county: M–Z =

The location of the State of Colorado in the United States of America.

The 64 counties of the U.S. State of Colorado

See also the Alphabetical list of populated places in Colorado.

This is a list of more than 3,800 currently, or formerly, inhabited places in the U.S. State of Colorado sorted by county. (Note: This list includes 1913 Colorado places selectively downloaded from the Geographic Names Information System on October 15, 2023.)
Currently inhabited places in Colorado include the:

- 273 municipalities from the List of municipalities in Colorado
- 210 census-designated places from the List of census-designated places in Colorado
- 64 counties from the List of counties in Colorado.
- 8 military bases from the List of military installations in Colorado
- 2 Native American reservations from the List of Native American reservations in Colorado

This list also includes the current and extinct populated places found in the:

- Geographic Names Information System
- United States Geological Survey historic trail maps
- List of county seats in Colorado
- List of forts in Colorado
- List of ghost towns in Colorado
- List of National Register of Historic Places in Colorado
- List of post offices in Colorado
- List of trading posts in Colorado

- For important dates associated with many of these places, please see the List of municipalities in Colorado and the List of post offices in Colorado.
- For the ZIP Codes for many of these places, please see the List of post offices in Colorado.
- For the telephone area codes for many of these places, please see the List of Colorado telephone area codes.
- For all federally recognized place names in Colorado, please see the Geographic Names Information System.

†	County seat
‡	Former county seat
#	State capital
⁂	Former territorial capital

Select a Colorado county:

- Adams
- Alamosa
- Arapahoe
- Archuleta
- Baca
- Bent
- Boulder
- Broomfield
- Chaffee
- Cheyenne
- Clear Creek
- Conejos
- Costilla
- Crowley
- Custer
- Delta
- Denver
- Dolores
- Douglas
- Eagle
- El Paso
- Elbert
- Fremont
- Garfield
- Gilpin
- Grand
- Gunnison
- Hinsdale
- Huerfano
- Jackson
- Jefferson
- Kiowa
- Kit Carson
- La Plata
- Lake
- Larimer
- Las Animas
- Lincoln
- Logan
- Mesa
- Mineral
- Moffat
- Montezuma
- Montrose
- Morgan
- Otero
- Ouray
- Park
- Phillips
- Pitkin
- Prowers
- Pueblo
- Rio Blanco
- Rio Grande
- Routt
- Saguache
- San Juan
- San Miguel
- Sedgwick
- Summit
- Teller
- Washington
- Weld
- Yuma

== Mesa County ==
Select the OpenStreetMap link at the right to view the location of places in this section.

Place	Type	ZIP Code	Location	Elevation
Akin	ghost town	81630	39.2547°N 108.2631°W	4,849 feet (1,478 m)
Appleton	unincorporated community	81505	39.1208°N 108.6082°W	4,593 feet (1,400 m)
Arlington	former post office			
Bernard	former post office			
Bridgeport	unincorporated community	81527	38.8367°N 108.3806°W	4,738 feet (1,444 m)
Bridges Switch	unincorporated community	81520	39.0986°N 108.4040°W	4,695 feet (1,431 m)
Cameo	ghost town	81520	39.1486°N 108.3209°W	4,787 feet (1,459 m)
Carpenter	ghost town			
Clifton	census-designated place	81520	39.0919°N 108.4490°W	4,721 feet (1,439 m)
Clover	former post office			
Collbran	statutory town	81624	39.2405°N 107.9612°W	5,988 feet (1,825 m)
Copper	former post office			
De Beque	statutory town	81630	39.3344°N 108.2151°W	4,954 feet (1,510 m)
Debeque	see De Beque			
Durham	unincorporated community	81505	39.0878°N 108.5990°W	4,554 feet (1,388 m)
Eagalite	former post office	81624		
Escalante	former post office			
Escalante Forks	former post office			
Excelsior	former post office			
Fruita	home rule city	81521	39.1589°N 108.7290°W	4,511 feet (1,375 m)
Fruitvale	census-designated place	81504	39.0816°N 108.4968°W	4,662 feet (1,421 m)
Gary	former post office	81524		
Gateway	unincorporated community	81522	38.6825°N 108.9751°W	4,616 feet (1,407 m)
Gavin	former post office			
Gilsonite	unincorporated community	81524	39.1769°N 108.7787°W	4,472 feet (1,363 m)
Glade Park	unincorporated community	81523	38.9936°N 108.7409°W	6,906 feet (2,105 m)
Grand Junction† (Note: On May 26, 1882, Ute changed its name to Grand Junction. Grand Junction has been the seat of Mesa County, Colorado since the county was created on February 11, 1883.)	home rule city	81501-81507	39.0639°N 108.5506°W	4,590 feet (1,399 m)
Harlow	former post office			
Hawkhurst	see Collbran			
Heiberger	unincorporated community	81624	39.2689°N 107.8023°W	7,133 feet (2,174 m)
Highland Park	unincorporated community	81504	39.0919°N 108.4815°W	4,718 feet (1,438 m)
Hope	former post office			
Ionia	former post office			
John Held Corner	unincorporated community	81643	39.1366°N 108.1362°W	6,132 feet (1,869 m)
Johnsons Corner	unincorporated community	81504	39.0919°N 108.4968°W	4,698 feet (1,432 m)
Jones	former post office			
Kannah	unincorporated community	81527	38.9391°N 108.4470°W	4,662 feet (1,421 m)
Leon	former post office			
Loma	census-designated place	81524	39.2075°N 108.8050°W	4,524 feet (1,379 m)
Mack	unincorporated community	81525	39.2239°N 108.8651°W	4,524 feet (1,379 m)
Mainard	see Loma			
Mesa (1883)	see Fruita			
Mesa (1887)	unincorporated community	81643	39.1664°N 108.1390°W	5,643 feet (1,720 m)
Mesa Lakes	unincorporated community	81643	39.0500°N 108.0923°W	9,800 feet (2,987 m)
Mesa Lakes Resort	unincorporated community	81643	39.0491°N 108.0915°W	9,803 feet (2,988 m)
Molina	unincorporated community	81646	39.1891°N 108.0604°W	5,600 feet (1,707 m)
Mount Lincoln	unincorporated community	81526	39.1061°N 108.3834°W	4,708 feet (1,435 m)
Mountainvale	former post office			
Orchard Mesa	census-designated place	81503	39.0430°N 108.5523°W	4,646 feet (1,416 m)
Orson	former post office			
Palisade	statutory town	81526	39.1103°N 108.3509°W	4,728 feet (1,441 m)
Palisades	see Palisade			
Pear Park	unincorporated community	81504	39.0703°N 108.4720°W	4,646 feet (1,416 m)
Pine Bluff	former post office			
Plateau	former post office			
Plateau City	unincorporated community	81624	39.2372°N 107.9817°W	5,965 feet (1,818 m)
Ravens	former post office			
Ravensbeque	former post office			
Redlands	census-designated place	81507	39.0789°N 108.6357°W	4,659 feet (1,420 m)
Rhone	unincorporated community	81521	39.1266°N 108.6784°W	4,521 feet (1,378 m)
Roan	former post office	81521		
Rocky	former post office			
Rosevale	unincorporated community	81507	39.0600°N 108.5804°W	4,560 feet (1,390 m)
Snipes	see Molina			
Tunnel	former post office			
Unaweep	former post office			
Utaline	unincorporated community	81525	39.1269°N 109.0423°W	4,669 feet (1,423 m)
Ute	see Grand Junction			
Vega	former post office			
Whitewater	unincorporated community	81527	38.9911°N 108.4534°W	4,646 feet (1,416 m)

== Mineral County ==
Select the OpenStreetMap link at the right to view the location of places in this section.

Place	Type	ZIP Code	Location	Elevation
Amethyst‡ (Note: On November 7, 1893, county voters selected Amethyst as the new seat of Mineral County, Colorado. On February 2, 1909, Amethyst changed its name to Creede. Creede has continued to serve as the county seat.)	see Creede			
Antelope Springs	former post office			
Bachelor	ghost town	81130		
Bachelor City	see Bachelor			
Bowenton	former post office			
Creede	statutory town	81130	37.8492°N 106.9264°W	8,799 feet (2,682 m)
Creedmoor	former post office			
Fisher	see Spar City			
Lucky Seven Summer Homes	unincorporated community	81154	37.5839°N 106.7398°W	8,560 feet (2,609 m)
North Creede	Creede neighborhood	81130	37.8642°N 106.9259°W	8,963 feet (2,732 m)
Spar	see Spar City			
Spar City	ghost town	81130	37.7072°N 106.9684°W	9,465 feet (2,885 m)
Sunnyside	unincorporated community	81130	37.8461°N 106.9603°W	8,901 feet (2,713 m)
Teller	see Bachelor			
Thornton	former post office	81154		
Wagon Wheel Gap	unincorporated community	81154		
Wason‡ (Note: Wason served eight months as the original seat of Mineral County, Colorado, from the creation of the county on March 27, 1893, until November 7 that year.)	ghost town			
Weaver	ghost town	81130	37.8839°N 106.9312°W	9,862 feet (3,006 m)
Willow	see Creede			

== Moffat County ==
Select the OpenStreetMap link at the right to view the location of places in this section.

Place	Type	ZIP Code	Location	Elevation
Artesia	see Dinosaur			
Axial	ghost town	81641	40.2853°N 107.7920°W	6,453 feet (1,967 m)
Blue Mountain	unincorporated community	81610	40.2483°N 108.8618°W	5,823 feet (1,775 m)
Caisson	former post office			
Craig† (Note: On August 28, 1889, Yampa changed its name to Craig. Craig has been the seat of Moffat County, Colorado since the county was created on February 27, 1911.)	home rule city	81625-81626	40.5152°N 107.5465°W	6,198 feet (1,889 m)
Craig Place	unincorporated community	81640	40.7202°N 108.9543°W	7,234 feet (2,205 m)
Craig South Highlands	unincorporated community	81625	40.4850°N 107.5631°W	6,394 feet (1,949 m)
Cross Mountain	former post office			
Deep Channel	former post office			
Dinosaur	statutory town	81610, 81633	40.2436°N 109.0146°W	5,922 feet (1,805 m)
Elk Springs	unincorporated community	81633	40.3555°N 108.4484°W	6,378 feet (1,944 m)
Escalante	former post office			
Fort Davy Crockett	historic trading post	81640		
Fort Misery	see Fort Davy Crockett			
Fourmile	former post office			
Great Divide	former post office			
Greystone	unincorporated community	81640	40.6094°N 108.6740°W	6,660 feet (2,030 m)
Hamilton	unincorporated community	81638	40.3672°N 107.6131°W	6,243 feet (1,903 m)
Hiawatha	unincorporated community	81640	40.9883°N 108.6204°W	7,149 feet (2,179 m)
Iles Grove	unincorporated community	81641	40.3353°N 107.6873°W	6,309 feet (1,923 m)
Jack Rabbit	former post office			
Jack Springs	unincorporated community	81610	40.3511°N 108.7032°W	7,113 feet (2,168 m)
Juniper	former post office			
Juniper Hot Springs	unincorporated community	81625	40.4672°N 107.9537°W	5,991 feet (1,826 m)
Juniper Springs	former post office			
Ladore	former post office			
Lay	unincorporated community	81625	40.5266°N 107.8820°W	6,181 feet (1,884 m)
Lily	former post office			
Lodore	former post office			
Loyd	unincorporated community	81641	40.3036°N 107.7048°W	6,401 feet (1,951 m)
Massadona	unincorporated community	81610	40.2527°N 108.6404°W	5,794 feet (1,766 m)
Maybell	census-designated place	81640	40.5188°N 108.0885°W	5,915 feet (1,803 m)
Morapos	former post office			
Mount Streeter	former post office			
Offield Place	unincorporated community	81640	40.9858°N 108.6632°W	6,683 feet (2,037 m)
Oneco	former post office			
Powder Wash	unincorporated community	81625	40.9458°N 108.3115°W	6,722 feet (2,049 m)
Price Creek	former post office			
Rivas	former post office			
Robinson Place	unincorporated community	81640	40.4058°N 108.9860°W	7,799 feet (2,377 m)
Routt	former post office			
Skull Creek	former post office			
Slater	unincorporated community	81653	40.9477°N 107.4978°W	7,753 feet (2,363 m)
Sparks	former post office			
Sunbeam	unincorporated community	81640	40.5508°N 108.1959°W	5,889 feet (1,795 m)
Wall Rock	former post office			
Wilson Place	unincorporated community	81640	40.7619°N 108.8937°W	5,338 feet (1,627 m)
Windsor	see Craig			
Yampa	see Craig			
Youghal	former post office			

== Montezuma County ==
Select the OpenStreetMap link at the right to view the location of places in this section.

Place	Type	ZIP Code	Location	Elevation
Ackmen	former post office			
Arloa	former post office			
Arriola	unincorporated community	81321	37.4425°N 108.6462°W	6,404 feet (1,952 m)
Badger House Community	ghost town	81330	37.1886°N 108.5345°W	7,126 feet (2,172 m)
Bearcreek	former post office			
Cortez† (Note: Cortez has been the seat of Montezuma County, Colorado since the county was created on April 16, 1889.)	home rule city	81321	37.3489°N 108.5859°W	6,191 feet (1,887 m)
Dolores	statutory town	81323	37.4739°N 108.5045°W	6,936 feet (2,114 m)
Echo House	unincorporated community	81330	37.1678°N 108.5001°W	6,686 feet (2,038 m)
Formby	former post office			
Golconda	unincorporated community	81328	37.4575°N 108.1523°W	9,163 feet (2,793 m)
Gradens	former post office			
Hogg	former post office	81323		
Lakevista	former post office			
Lebanon	unincorporated community	81323	37.4572°N 108.5915°W	6,673 feet (2,034 m)
Lewis	census-designated place	81327	37.5017°N 108.6601°W	6,726 feet (2,050 m)
Lone Dome	former post office			
Lonedome	former post office			
Mancos	statutory town	81328	37.3450°N 108.2892°W	7,028 feet (2,142 m)
Mancos Creek	former post office			
Mariano	unincorporated community	81321	37.1794°N 108.8734°W	5,591 feet (1,704 m)
McElmo	former post office			
McPhee (Note: McPhee is now submerged in McPhee Reservoir.)	ghost town			
Mesa Verde National Park	post office	81330		
Mildred	former post office			
Millard	former post office			
Millwood	unincorporated community	81328	37.4217°N 108.3337°W	7,625 feet (2,324 m)
Moqui	former post office			
Morgan	former post office			
Navajo Springs	former post office			
Paymaster	former post office			
Pleasant View	unincorporated community	81331	37.5894°N 108.7651°W	6,913 feet (2,107 m)
Point Lookout	former post office			
Quarry	former post office			
Renaraye	former post office			
Roundup Junction	unincorporated community	81328	37.4828°N 108.1623°W	10,249 feet (3,124 m)
Ruin Canyon	former post office			
Sago	former post office			
Spargo	former post office			
Stapleton	unincorporated community	81323	37.4989°N 108.4048°W	7,136 feet (2,175 m)
Stoner	unincorporated community	81323	37.5894°N 108.3201°W	7,474 feet (2,278 m)
Swallows Nest	unincorporated community	81330	37.1572°N 108.4679°W	6,755 feet (2,059 m)
Towaoc	census-designated place	81334	37.2044°N 108.7295°W	5,912 feet (1,802 m)
Weber	unincorporated community	81328	37.3125°N 108.2892°W	7,152 feet (2,180 m)
Westfork	former post office			
Yellow Jacket	unincorporated community	81335	37.5344°N 108.7173°W	6,900 feet (2,103 m)

== Montrose County ==
Select the OpenStreetMap link at the right to view the location of places in this section.

Place	Type	ZIP Code	Location	Elevation
Barnes	former post office			
Bedrock	unincorporated community	81411	38.3150°N 108.8909°W	4,990 feet (1,521 m)
Brown	see Olathe			
Cameville	former post office			
Cantonment at Uncompahgre	see Fort Crawford			
Cashin	former post office			
Cedar Brook	former post office			
Cedar Creek	unincorporated community	81401	38.4789°N 107.7145°W	6,762 feet (2,061 m)
Chipeta	see Naturita			
Cimarron	unincorporated community	81220	38.4425°N 107.5567°W	6,896 feet (2,102 m)
Coventry	unincorporated community	81431	38.1600°N 108.3748°W	6,677 feet (2,035 m)
Crystal	former post office			
East Vancorum	unincorporated community	81422	38.2278°N 108.5951°W	5,407 feet (1,648 m)
Eva	former post office			
Fairview	unincorporated community	81401	38.4889°N 107.8031°W	6,132 feet (1,869 m)
Fort Crawford	historic U.S. Army post	81403		
Frost	unincorporated community	81425	38.5672°N 107.9701°W	5,453 feet (1,662 m)
Hoovers Corner	unincorporated community	81425	38.6069°N 108.0590°W	5,449 feet (1,661 m)
Horsefly	former post office			
Houser Cow Camp	unincorporated community	81424	38.3294°N 108.3056°W	8,517 feet (2,596 m)
Hydraulic	former post office			
L1	former post office			
Lujane	unincorporated community	81401	38.4872°N 107.7337°W	6,601 feet (2,012 m)
Maher	unincorporated community	81415	38.6450°N 107.5848°W	6,808 feet (2,075 m)
Menoken	former post office			
Montrose† (Note: Montrose has been the seat of Montrose County, Colorado since the county was created on February 11, 1883.)	home rule city	81401-81403	38.4783°N 107.8762°W	5,807 feet (1,770 m)
Mountain View	unincorporated community	81424	38.3053°N 108.4840°W	6,617 feet (2,017 m)
Naturita	statutory town	81422	38.2183°N 108.5687°W	5,423 feet (1,653 m)
Nucla	statutory town	81424	38.2694°N 108.5479°W	5,787 feet (1,764 m)
Oak Grove	unincorporated community	81403	38.4600°N 107.9281°W	5,928 feet (1,807 m)
Olathe	statutory town	81425	38.6050°N 107.9823°W	5,358 feet (1,633 m)
Paradox	unincorporated community	81429	38.3683°N 108.9623°W	5,299 feet (1,615 m)
Paxton	former post office			
Pea Green Corner	unincorporated community	81425	38.6500°N 108.0951°W	5,308 feet (1,618 m)
Piñon	unincorporated community	81424	38.2667°N 108.4006°W	5,846 feet (1,782 m)
Redvale	census-designated place	81431	38.1761°N 108.4125°W	6,499 feet (1,981 m)
River Portal	former post office			
Roe	unincorporated community	81403	38.5378°N 107.9448°W	5,564 feet (1,696 m)
Rudolph	former post office			
Shenandoah	former post office			
Sinbad	former post office			
Uncompahgre	unincorporated community	81403	38.3780°N 107.8187°W	6,165 feet (1,879 m)
Uranium	ghost town			
Uravan	ghost town		38.3683°N 108.7365°W	4,990 feet (1,521 m)
Ute	unincorporated community	81431	38.2555°N 108.2712°W	7,569 feet (2,307 m)
Vancorum	unincorporated community	81422	38.2317°N 108.5956°W	5,341 feet (1,628 m)
Vernal	unincorporated community	81403	38.3897°N 107.8292°W	6,115 feet (1,864 m)
West Vancorum	unincorporated community	81422	38.2278°N 108.6006°W	5,404 feet (1,647 m)

== Morgan County ==
Select the OpenStreetMap link at the right to view the location of places in this section.

Place	Type	ZIP Code	Location	Elevation
Adena	ghost town	80701	40.0083°N 103.8866°W	4,692 feet (1,430 m)
Antelope Springs	former post office			
Bijou View	former post office			
Bijouview	former post office			
Blue Sky	census-designated place	80701	40.3001°N 103.8055°W	4,386 feet (1,337 m)
Brush	statutory city	80723	40.2589°N 103.6238°W	4,219 feet (1,286 m)
Camden	unincorporated community	80723	40.3041°N 103.5491°W	4,193 feet (1,278 m)
Camp Tyler	see Fort Morgan			
Camp Wardwell	see Fort Morgan			
Cooper	unincorporated community	80750	40.3605°N 103.5291°W	4,144 feet (1,263 m)
Corona	see Wiggins			
Cotsworth	former post office			
Deuel	see Weldona			
Dodd	unincorporated community	80701	40.2872°N 103.7075°W	4,229 feet (1,289 m)
Dublin Bay	former post office			
Fort Morgan† (Note: Fort Morgan has been the seat of Morgan County, Colorado since the county was created on February 19, 1889.)	home rule city	80701	40.2503°N 103.8000°W	4,327 feet (1,319 m)
Fort Morgan (1864)	historic U.S. Army post	80701, 80705		
Fremont	former post office			
Gary	unincorporated community	80723	40.0739°N 103.5849°W	4,380 feet (1,335 m)
Goodrich	unincorporated community	80653	40.3511°N 104.0616°W	4,383 feet (1,336 m)
Hillrose	statutory town	80733	40.3258°N 103.5219°W	4,170 feet (1,271 m)
Hoyt	unincorporated community	80654	40.0155°N 104.0750°W	4,764 feet (1,452 m)
Hurley	unincorporated community	80701	40.2741°N 103.7616°W	4,255 feet (1,297 m)
Jackson Lake	census-designated place	80653	40.3642°N 104.0719°W	4,406 feet (1,343 m)
Junction	see Fort Morgan			
Junction House	former post office			
Lamb	unincorporated community	80701	40.2450°N 103.8477°W	4,360 feet (1,329 m)
Lodi	unincorporated community	80701	40.2511°N 103.7038°W	4,272 feet (1,302 m)
Log Lane Village	statutory town	80705	40.2705°N 103.8297°W	4,308 feet (1,313 m)
Morgan Heights	census-designated place	80401	40.2875°N 103.8274°W	4,432 feet (1,351 m)
Moseley	unincorporated community	80701	40.2489°N 103.7541°W	4,301 feet (1,311 m)
Nelson	unincorporated community	80723	40.2528°N 103.6608°W	4,252 feet (1,296 m)
Ninemile Corner (Note: There are two unincorporated communities named Ninemile Corner in Morgan County, Colorado. This one is south of Fort Morgan.)	unincorporated community	80701	40.1161°N 103.7927°W	4,403 feet (1,342 m)
Ninemile Corner (Note: There are two unincorporated communities named Ninemile Corner in Morgan County, Colorado. This one is south of Brush.)	unincorporated community	80723	40.1464°N 103.5844°W	4,311 feet (1,314 m)
Orchard	census-designated place	80649	40.3320°N 104.1178°W	4,409 feet (1,344 m)
Pawnee	former post office			
Saddle Ridge	census-designated place	80701	40.3131°N 103.8023°W	4,478 feet (1,365 m)
Snyder	census-designated place	80750	40.3308°N 103.5920°W	4,180 feet (1,274 m)
Trail Side	census-designated place	80701	40.2490°N 103.8432°W	4,354 feet (1,327 m)
Twelvemile Corner	unincorporated community	80701	40.0733°N 103.7927°W	4,495 feet (1,370 m)
Union	unincorporated community	80750	40.3766°N 103.5011°W	4,127 feet (1,258 m)
Vallery	former post office			
Weldon Valley	former post office			
Weldona	census-designated place	80653	40.3484°N 103.9694°W	4,354 feet (1,327 m)
Wiggins	statutory town	80654	40.2305°N 104.0727°W	4,554 feet (1,388 m)

== Otero County ==
Select the OpenStreetMap link at the right to view the location of places in this section.

Place	Type	ZIP Code	Location	Elevation
Alexander	see Fowler			
Angora	former post office			
Ayer	ghost town	81059	37.7581°N 103.8463°W	4,583 feet (1,397 m)
Benton	unincorporated community	81050	37.9050°N 103.6572°W	4,281 feet (1,305 m)
Bent's Fort	see Bent's Old Fort			
Bent's Old Fort	historic trading post	81050	38.0406°N 103.4294°W	4,008 feet (1,222 m)
Bloom	ghost town	81059	37.6875°N 103.9566°W	4,800 feet (1,463 m)
Casa	unincorporated community	81050	38.0092°N 103.4722°W	4,029 feet (1,228 m)
Castiel	unincorporated community	81050	38.1072°N 103.4630°W	4,134 feet (1,260 m)
Catlin	see Manzanola			
Cheraw	statutory town	81030	38.1070°N 103.5102°W	4,131 feet (1,259 m)
Elder	unincorporated community	81039	38.1233°N 103.9672°W	4,308 feet (1,313 m)
Fairmount	see Swink			
Fayette	unincorporated community	81067	38.0728°N 103.7694°W	4,229 feet (1,289 m)
Fort El Puebla	see Milk Fort			
Fort Independence	see Milk Fort			
Fort Leche	see Milk Fort			
Fort William	see Bent's Old Fort			
Fowler	statutory town	81039	38.1292°N 104.0233°W	4,341 feet (1,323 m)
Hadley	unincorporated community	81050	38.0383°N 103.4033°W	3,993 feet (1,217 m)
Hawley	unincorporated community	81067	37.9828°N 103.7111°W	4,199 feet (1,280 m)
Hays	unincorporated community	81067	38.0731°N 103.6191°W	4,183 feet (1,275 m)
Higbee	unincorporated community	81050	37.7764°N 103.4594°W	4,236 feet (1,291 m)
Holbrook	former post office			
Iron Spring	see Bloom			
La Junta† (Note: La Junta has been the seat of Otero County, Colorado since the county was created on March 25, 1889.)	home rule city	81050	37.9850°N 103.5438°W	4,078 feet (1,243 m)
La Junta Army Air Field	historic U.S. Army air field	81050	38.0467°N 103.5125°W	4,193 feet (1,278 m)
La Junta Gardens	census-designated place	81050	37.9995°N 103.5536°W	4,065 feet (1,239 m)
La Junta Village	unincorporated community	81050	38.0375°N 103.5311°W	4,249 feet (1,295 m)
Manzanola	statutory town	81058	38.1095°N 103.8661°W	4,255 feet (1,297 m)
Milk Fort	historic trading post	81050		
Mindeman	unincorporated community	81059	37.7070°N 103.9166°W	4,718 feet (1,438 m)
North La Junta	census-designated place	81050	37.9985°N 103.5227°W	4,045 feet (1,233 m)
Old Fort Bent	see Bent's Old Fort			
Omer	former post office			
Ormega	unincorporated community	81050	37.9608°N 103.5863°W	4,216 feet (1,285 m)
Orr	unincorporated community	81050	38.1075°N 103.5352°W	4,154 feet (1,266 m)
Oxford	see Fowler			
Peebles Fort	see Milk Fort			
Pueblo de Leche	see Milk Fort			
Randall	unincorporated community	81050	38.0956°N 103.5797°W	4,206 feet (1,282 m)
Rene	former post office			
Roberta	unincorporated community	81050	37.9964°N 103.6758°W	4,154 feet (1,266 m)
Rocky Ford	statutory city	81067	38.0525°N 103.7202°W	4,180 feet (1,274 m)
Shelton	unincorporated community	81067	38.0833°N 103.6063°W	4,203 feet (1,281 m)
South Side	former post office			
Swink	statutory town	81077	38.0145°N 103.6283°W	4,121 feet (1,256 m)
Timpas	unincorporated community	81059	37.8181°N 103.7741°W	4,429 feet (1,350 m)
Village	former post office			
Vroman	unincorporated community	81067	38.0897°N 103.8102°W	4,236 feet (1,291 m)
Weitzer	see Vroman			

== Ouray County ==
Select the OpenStreetMap link at the right to view the location of places in this section.

Place	Type	ZIP Code	Location	Elevation
Ash	former post office			
Aurora	former post office			
Camp Bird	unincorporated community	81427	37.9728°N 107.7264°W	9,728 feet (2,965 m)
Campbird	see Camp Bird			
Colona	census-designated place	81403	38.3275°N 107.7793°W	6,375 feet (1,943 m)
Dallas	ghost town	81432	38.1833°N 107.7448°W	6,923 feet (2,110 m)
Dallas City	see Dallas			
Dallas Divide	former post office			
Dallasville	former post office			
Eldredge	unincorporated community	81403	38.2878°N 107.7673°W	6,539 feet (1,993 m)
Gabbert	former post office			
Guston	ghost town	81432	37.9164°N 107.6903°W	10,846 feet (3,306 m)
Hot Spring	former post office			
Ironton	ghost town	81432	37.9328°N 107.6803°W	9,800 feet (2,987 m)
Lawrence	former post office			
Loghill Village	census-designated place	81432	38.1953°N 107.7795°W	7,884 feet (2,403 m)
Mount Sneffels	see Sneffels			
Ouray† (Note: Ouray has been the seat of Ouray County, Colorado since the county was created on January 18, 1877, although the name of the county was changed to Uncompahgre County for the three days from February 27 to March 2, 1883.)	home rule city	81427	38.0228°N 107.6714°W	7,792 feet (2,375 m)
Plumer	former post office			
Portland	census-designated place	81432		
Red Mountain	ghost town			
Ridgway	home rule town	81432	38.1528°N 107.7617°W	7,047 feet (2,148 m)
Rogersville	former post office			
Ruby City	former post office			
Sneffels	ghost town	81427	37.9753°N 107.7498°W	10,620 feet (3,237 m)
Thistledown	unincorporated community	81427	37.9936°N 107.6998°W	8,730 feet (2,661 m)
Trout	former post office			
Uncompahgre City	see Ouray			
Virginius	former post office			
Windham	former post office			

== Park County ==
Select the OpenStreetMap link at the right to view the location of places in this section.

Place	Type	ZIP Code	Location	Elevation
Alma	statutory town	80420	39.2839°N 106.0628°W	10,361 feet (3,158 m)
Alma Junction	unincorporated community	80440	39.2675°N 106.0453°W	10,256 feet (3,126 m)
Antero Junction	ghost town	80449	38.9233°N 105.9653°W	9,186 feet (2,800 m)
Bailey	unincorporated community	80421	39.4055°N 105.4733°W	7,740 feet (2,359 m)
Balfour	unincorporated community	80449	38.9072°N 105.7244°W	9,094 feet (2,772 m)
Bath	former post office			
Black Mountain	former post office			
Bordenville	unincorporated community	80456	39.2761°N 105.6836°W	8,996 feet (2,742 m)
Buckskin‡ (Note: On January 7, 1862, county voters selected Laurette as the new seat of Park County, Colorado Territory. On December 21, 1865, Laurette changed its name to Buckskin, commonly known as Buckskin Joe. Buckskin Joe served as county seat until November 7, 1867.)	see Buckskin Joe			
Buckskin Joe‡	ghost town			
Buffalo Springs	former post office			
Chase	former post office			
Como	unincorporated community	80432, 80456	39.3161°N 105.8928°W	9,813 feet (2,991 m)
Conrad	former post office			
Cortrite	former post office			
Dake	former post office			
Deer Valley	former post office			
Devine	former post office			
Doran	former post office			
Dudley	unincorporated community	80420	39.2969°N 106.0717°W	10,502 feet (3,201 m)
Estabrook	unincorporated community	80421	39.3830°N 105.4294°W	7,562 feet (2,305 m)
Fair Play‡ (Note: On November 7, 1867, county voters selected Fair Play as the new seat of Park County, Colorado Territory, and since statehood on August 1, 1876, the seat of Park County, Colorado. On October 1, 1924, Fair Play changed its name to Fairplay, and has continued to serve as county seat.)	see Fairplay			
Fairplay†	statutory town	80440, 80432; 80456	39.2247°N 106.0020°W	9,954 feet (3,034 m)
Fairville	see Shawnee			
Garo	ghost town	80440	39.1078°N 105.8903°W	9,196 feet (2,803 m)
Glenisle	unincorporated community	80421	39.4089°N 105.5097°W	8,054 feet (2,455 m)
Glentivar	unincorporated community	80827	39.0478°N 105.6042°W	8,868 feet (2,703 m)
Granite Vale	former post office			
Grant	unincorporated community	80448	39.4597°N 105.6617°W	8,606 feet (2,623 m)
Grant Village	see Grant			
Guffey	census-designated place	80820	38.7591°N 105.5024°W	8,891 feet (2,710 m)
Hall Valley	former post office			
Hallvale	former post office			
Hamilton	ghost town			
Hammond	former post office			
Harris Park	unincorporated community	80421	39.5117°N 105.4911°W	8,852 feet (2,698 m)
Hartsel	census-designated place	80449	39.0217°N 105.7958°W	8,871 feet (2,704 m)
Haver	unincorporated community	80449	38.9650°N 105.9275°W	8,967 feet (2,733 m)
Hayman	unincorporated community	80827		
Highland Park	unincorporated community	80421	39.4989°N 105.5292°W	8,957 feet (2,730 m)
Holland	former post office			
Horse Shoe	see Horseshoe			
Horseshoe	unincorporated community	80440	39.2039°N 106.0853°W	10,558 feet (3,218 m)
Howbert	former post office			
Idaville	see Guffey			
Insmont	unincorporated community	80421	39.3919°N 105.4531°W	7,710 feet (2,350 m)
Jefferson	unincorporated community	80456	39.3772°N 105.8006°W	9,501 feet (2,896 m)
Kenosha	former post office			
Kester	former post office			
King	former post office			
Lake George	unincorporated community	80827	38.9797°N 105.3575°W	7,992 feet (2,436 m)
Laurette‡	see Buckskin Joe			
Leavick	unincorporated community	80420	39.1950°N 106.1375°W	11,243 feet (3,427 m)
London	former post office			
Montgomery	former post office			
Montgomery City	former post office			
Mountaindale	former post office			
Mullenville	former post office			
Olava	see Grant			
Park City	unincorporated community	80420	39.2783°N 106.0931°W	10,499 feet (3,200 m)
Peabodys	unincorporated community	80440	39.3480°N 105.9272°W	10,154 feet (3,095 m)
Pike-San Isabel Village	unincorporated community	80449	39.0519°N 105.7206°W	8,983 feet (2,738 m)
Platte	former post office			
Platte Springs	unincorporated community	80827	39.0636°N 105.3586°W	8,376 feet (2,553 m)
Platte Station	former post office			
Puma City	see Tarryall (founded 1896)			
Quartzville	unincorporated community	80420	39.3450°N 106.0772°W	11,572 feet (3,527 m)
Rocky	former post office			
Santa Maria	unincorporated community	80448	39.4497°N 105.6333°W	8,471 feet (2,582 m)
Shawnee	unincorporated community	80475	39.4211°N 105.5542°W	8,120 feet (2,475 m)
Silver Springs	unincorporated community	80470	39.4592°N 105.3961°W	8,399 feet (2,560 m)
Singleton	unincorporated community	80475	39.4430°N 105.6019°W	8,301 feet (2,530 m)
Slaghts	see Shawnee			
South Park	former post office			
Spinney	former post office			
Springer	former post office			
Sterling	former post office			
Sulphur Springs	former post office			
Tarryall 1859‡ (Note: On November 28, 1859, the Provisional Government of the Territory of Jefferson created 12 counties, with Tarryall City as the seat of Park County, Jefferson Territory. On January 4, 1860, Tarryall City shortened its name to Tarryall. On November 1, 1861, the new Territory of Colorado created 17 original counties, with Tarryall as the original seat of Park County, Colorado Territory, serving until January 7, 1862.)	see Tarryall City			
Tarryall 1896	unincorporated community	80827	39.1219°N 105.4756°W	8,714 feet (2,656 m)
Tarryall City‡	ghost town			
Timberton	former post office			
Trump	unincorporated community	80449	38.8492°N 105.7883°W	9,436 feet (2,876 m)
Truro	former post office			
Wadleigh	former post office			
Webster	ghost town	80421	39.4575°N 105.7203°W	9,042 feet (2,756 m)
Weller	unincorporated community	80475	39.4475°N 105.6206°W	8,461 feet (2,579 m)
Weston	former post office			
Will-O-The-Wisp	unincorporated community	80421	39.4614°N 105.4103°W	8,373 feet (2,552 m)

== Phillips County ==
Select the OpenStreetMap link at the right to view the location of places in this section.

Place	Type	ZIP Code	Location	Elevation
Amherst	census-designated place	80721	40.6832°N 102.1726°W	3,691 feet (1,125 m)
Emerson	former post office			
Haxtum	see Haxtun			
Haxtun	statutory town	80731	40.6411°N 102.6269°W	4,029 feet (1,228 m)
Holyoke† (Note: Holyoke has been the seat of Phillips County, Colorado since the county was created on March 27, 1889.)	home rule city	80734	40.5844°N 102.3024°W	3,737 feet (1,139 m)
Paoli	statutory town	80746	40.6122°N 102.4727°W	3,894 feet (1,187 m)
Starr	former post office			
Wakeman	former post office			

== Pitkin County ==
Select the OpenStreetMap link at the right to view the location of places in this section.

Place	Type	ZIP Code	Location	Elevation
Ashcroft	ghost town	81611	39.0536°N 106.7998°W	9,521 feet (2,902 m)
Aspen† (Note: Aspen has been the seat of Pitkin County, Colorado since the county was created on February 23, 1881.)	home rule city	81611-81612	39.1911°N 106.8175°W	7,890 feet (2,405 m)
Aspen-Gerbaz	former post office			
Basalt (Note: The Town of Basalt straddles both Eagle and Pitkin counties.)	home rule town	81621	See also Basalt in Eagle County.	
Biglow	unincorporated community	81642	39.3436°N 106.6673°W	8,337 feet (2,541 m)
Calcium	see Thomasville			
Carey	former post office			
Castle Forks City	see Ashcroft			
Chipeta	former post office			
Chloride	see Ashcroft			
Davies	former post office			
Emma	unincorporated community	81621	39.3650°N 107.0617°W	6,608 feet (2,014 m)
Farwell	former post office			
Gerbazdale	former post office			
Gulch	former post office			
Independence	ghost town	81611	39.1072°N 106.6059°W	10,912 feet (3,326 m)
Ivanhoe	former post office			
Janeway	former post office			
Lenado	ghost town	81654	39.2425°N 106.7625°W	8,540 feet (2,603 m)
Meredith	unincorporated community	81642	39.3630°N 106.7300°W	7,772 feet (2,369 m)
Nast	unincorporated community	81642	39.2917°N 106.6014°W	8,865 feet (2,702 m)
Norrie	census-designated place	81642	39.3281°N 106.6563°W	8,448 feet (2,575 m)
Old Snowmass	see Snowmass			
Placita	unincorporated community	81623	39.1322°N 107.2628°W	7,448 feet (2,270 m)
Redstone	census-designated place	81623	39.1822°N 107.2383°W	7,175 feet (2,187 m)
Roaring Fork	former post office			
Ruby	ghost town	81611	39.0208°N 106.6092°W	11,381 feet (3,469 m)
Sellar	former post office			
Sidney	former post office			
Snowmass	unincorporated community	81654	39.3317°N 106.9862°W	6,847 feet (2,087 m)
Snowmass Village	home rule town	81615	39.2130°N 106.9378°W	8,209 feet (2,502 m)
Sparkill	former post office			
Spring Gulch	former post office			
Thomasville	ghost town	81642	39.3603°N 106.7025°W	8,018 feet (2,444 m)
Tourtellotte	former post office			
Tourtellotte Park	former post office			
Watson	former post office			
Wingo	unincorporated community	81654	39.3458°N 107.0103°W	6,768 feet (2,063 m)
Woody Creek	census-designated place	81656	39.2709°N 106.8883°W	7,290 feet (2,222 m)

== Prowers County ==
Select the OpenStreetMap link at the right to view the location of places in this section.

Place	Type	ZIP Code	Location	Elevation	
Albany	former post office				
Amache National Historic Site	former internment camp	81041	38.0496°N 102.3286°W	3,602 feet (1,098 m)	
Amity	former post office				
Ayr	former post office				
Barton	former post office				
Beta	unincorporated community	81052	38.0861°N 102.6905°W	3,655 feet (1,114 m)	
Blackwell	former post office				
Bristol	unincorporated community	81047	38.1222°N 102.3116°W	3,560 feet (1,085 m)	
Camp Amache	see Amache National Historic Site				
Carlton	unincorporated community	81052	38.0847°N 102.4196°W	3,537 feet (1,078 m)	
Channing	unincorporated community	81052	38.1436°N 102.5494°W	3,661 feet (1,116 m)	
Cheney Center	former post office				
Culp	unincorporated community	81052	38.1358°N 102.6094°W	3,655 feet (1,114 m)	
Deur	former post office				
Duer	former post office				
Ella	former post office				
Goodale	unincorporated community	81047	38.1181°N 102.4352°W	3,540 feet (1,079 m)	
Granada	statutory town	81041	38.0639°N 102.3105°W	3,484 feet (1,062 m)	
Granada War Relocation Center	see Amache National Historic Site				81041
Grenada	see Granada				
Grote	unincorporated community	81052	38.0872°N 102.4157°W	3,530 feet (1,076 m)	
Hartman	statutory town	81043	38.1203°N 102.2199°W	3,599 feet (1,097 m)	
Holly	statutory town	81047	38.0522°N 102.1227°W	3,392 feet (1,034 m)	
Karl	unincorporated community	81052	38.1375°N 102.5199°W	3,642 feet (1,110 m)	
Koen	unincorporated community	81041	38.0714°N 102.3469°W	3,510 feet (1,070 m)	
Kornman	unincorporated community	81052	38.1503°N 102.6121°W	3,688 feet (1,124 m)	
Lamar† (Note: Lamar has been the seat of Prowers County, Colorado since the county was created on April 11, 1889.)	home rule city	81052	38.0872°N 102.6207°W	3,619 feet (1,103 m)	
Martynia	former post office				
May Valley	unincorporated community	81052	38.2017°N 102.6138°W	3,760 feet (1,146 m)	
McMillan	former post office				
Mulvane	former post office				
Northway	former post office				
Norton	former post office				
Parrish	unincorporated community	81047	38.1217°N 102.3846°W	3,596 feet (1,096 m)	
Plains	former post office				
Rowe	former post office				
Sugar	unincorporated community	81052	38.1503°N 102.6685°W	3,740 feet (1,140 m)	
Toledo	former post office				
Verdun	former post office				
Warwick	unincorporated community	81047	38.1239°N 102.2741°W	3,586 feet (1,093 m)	
Webb	former post office				
West Farm	unincorporated community	81052	38.0928°N 102.5585°W	3,589 feet (1,094 m)	
Wilde	former post office				
Wiley	statutory town	81092	38.1542°N 102.7196°W	3,737 feet (1,139 m)	
Zuck	former post office				

== Pueblo County ==
Select the OpenStreetMap link at the right to view the location of places in this section.

Place	Type	ZIP Code	Location	Elevation
Abbey	former post office			
Agate	former post office			
Andersonville	former post office			
Arland	former post office			
Arlene	former post office			
Armour	former post office			
Artman	former post office			
Autobees (Note: On November 1, 1861, the Territory of Colorado created 17 original counties, with Autobees Plaza as the original seat of Huerfano County, Colorado Territory, serving until 1868.)	see Autobees Plaza			
Autobees Plaza‡	ghost town	81022	38.2100°N 104.2872°W	4,495 feet (1,370 m)
Avondale	census-designated place	81022	38.2375°N 104.3511°W	4,557 feet (1,389 m)
Baxter	unincorporated community	81006	38.2758°N 104.4916°W	4,606 feet (1,404 m)
Belmont	Pueblo post office	81001		
Beulah (Note: The Beulah post office serves Beulah Valley.)	unincorporated community	81023	38.0750°N 104.9867°W	6,381 feet (1,945 m)
Beulah Valley	census-designated place	81023	38.0722°N 104.9664°W	6,171 feet (1,881 m)
Blende	census-designated place	81006	38.2470°N 104.5715°W	4,741 feet (1,445 m)
Boone	statutory town	81025	38.2486°N 104.2569°W	4,465 feet (1,361 m)
Booneville	see Boone			
Bragdon	unincorporated community	81008	38.4019°N 104.6116°W	4,951 feet (1,509 m)
Bronquist	unincorporated community	81005	38.2019°N 104.8917°W	5,325 feet (1,623 m)
Burnt Mill	unincorporated community	81023	38.0517°N 104.7964°W	5,374 feet (1,638 m)
Capers Spur	unincorporated community	81069	37.9093°N 104.7072°W	5,735 feet (1,748 m)
Cedar Crest	unincorporated community	81039	37.8070°N 104.2986°W	5,489 feet (1,673 m)
Cedar Grove	unincorporated community	81023	38.0750°N 104.9389°W	6,083 feet (1,854 m)
Cedarwood	unincorporated community	81069	37.9417°N 104.6175°W	5,604 feet (1,708 m)
Chilcott	former post office			
Colorado City	census-designated place	81019	37.9453°N 104.8353°W	5,853 feet (1,784 m)
Cousin Springs	former post office			
Crow	former post office			
Cuerna Verde Park	unincorporated community	81069	37.9220°N 104.9714°W	7,582 feet (2,311 m)
Dawkins	former post office			
Devine	unincorporated community	81006	38.2750°N 104.4575°W	4,583 feet (1,397 m)
Duke	former post office			
Eden	unincorporated community	81008	38.3164°N 104.6164°W	4,843 feet (1,476 m)
El Pueblo	historic trading post	81003		
Excelsior	former post office			
Fearnowville	unincorporated community	81001	38.2792°N 104.5603°W	4,688 feet (1,429 m)
Fisher	former post office			
Foothills	former post office			
Fort Cass	historic trading post	81025		
Fort Fisher	see El Pueblo			
Fort Huerfano	historic encampment	81025		
Fort Juana	see El Pueblo			
Fort Nepesta	see El Pueblo			
Fort Pueblo	see El Pueblo			
Fort Reynolds	historic U.S. Army fort	81025	38.2306°N 104.3033°W	4,534 feet (1,382 m)
Fort Spaulding	see El Pueblo			
Goodnight	unincorporated community	81005	38.2611°N 104.6700°W	4,774 feet (1,455 m)
Goodpasture	unincorporated community	81023	38.0833°N 104.9200°W	6,115 feet (1,864 m)
Graneros	former post office			
Greenhorn	unincorporated community	81069	37.9070°N 104.8533°W	6,089 feet (1,856 m)
Grimaldi	former post office			
Hamlet	unincorporated community	81039	38.1547°N 104.0939°W	4,357 feet (1,328 m)
Haynes Ranch	former post office			
Hermosilla	former post office			
Hobson	unincorporated community	81007	38.3408°N 104.9344°W	4,941 feet (1,506 m)
Holden	former post office			
Huerfano	former post office			
Jackson	former post office			
Juanita	former post office			
Juniata	former post office			
Keble	former post office			
Kinkel	former post office	81023		
Lamar	former post office			
Lebanon	former post office			
Lees	former post office			
Lime	former post office			
Lombard Village	unincorporated community	81006	38.2250°N 104.5450°W	4,803 feet (1,464 m)
Marnel	former post office			
Mercier	former post office			
Midtown	Pueblo post office	81003		
Muddy Creek	former post office			
Myrtle	former post office			
Nepesta	unincorporated community	81039	38.1689°N 104.1430°W	4,416 feet (1,346 m)
North Avondale	unincorporated community	81022	38.2619°N 104.3461°W	4,518 feet (1,377 m)
Nyberg	unincorporated community	81006	38.2683°N 104.3980°W	4,544 feet (1,385 m)
Osage	former post office			
Osage Avenue	former post office			
Overton	former post office			
Piñon	unincorporated community	81008	38.4333°N 104.6075°W	5,013 feet (1,528 m)
Pueblo† (Note: On November 28, 1859, the Provisional Government of the Territory of Jefferson created 12 counties, with Pueblo as the seat of Fountain County, Jefferson Territory. On November 1, 1861, the new Territory of Colorado created 17 original counties, with Pueblo as the seat of Pueblo County, Colorado Territory, and since statehood on August 1, 1876, the seat of Pueblo County, Colorado.)	home rule city	81001-81012	38.2544°N 104.6091°W	4,692 feet (1,430 m)
Pueblo Army Air Base	historic U.S. Army air base	81001	38.2939°N 104.4992°W	4,689 feet (1,429 m)
Pueblo Chemical Depot	United States Army depot	81006	38.3143°N 104.3313°W	4,731 feet (1,442 m)
Pueblo West	census-designated place	81007	38.3500°N 104.7228°W	5,066 feet (1,544 m)
Robert Fisher's Fort	see El Pueblo			
Rock Creek	former post office			
Rock Crossing	unincorporated community	81039	37.7700°N 104.1241°W	4,790 feet (1,460 m)
Rye	statutory town	81069	37.9236°N 104.9303°W	6,801 feet (2,073 m)
Saint Charles	unincorporated community	81004	38.1389°N 104.6214°W	4,964 feet (1,513 m)
Salt Creek	census-designated place	81006	38.2384°N 104.5871°W	4,751 feet (1,448 m)
Siloam	ghost town	81005	38.2514°N 104.9758°W	5,449 feet (1,661 m)
Sitton	former post office			
South Pueblo	former statutory town	81004		
Sparrow	former post office			
Sperryvale	former post office			
Stem Beach	unincorporated community	81004	38.1639°N 104.6436°W	4,964 feet (1,513 m)
Stone City	unincorporated community	81007	38.4486°N 104.8611°W	5,545 feet (1,690 m)
Sunset	Pueblo post office	81005		
Swallows	ghost town	81007	38.3022°N 104.8603°W	4,885 feet (1,489 m)
Table Mountain	former post office	81069		
Taylorville	former post office			
Undercliffe	former post office			
Valley View	unincorporated community	81023	38.0683°N 104.9769°W	6,286 feet (1,916 m)
Verde	former post office			
Vineland	census-designated place	81006	38.2447°N 104.4599°W	4,646 feet (1,416 m)
Waremont	former post office			
White Rock	former post office			
Whiterock	unincorporated community	81039	37.8658°N 104.1144°W	4,715 feet (1,437 m)
Wild Horse	unincorporated community	81007	38.3292°N 104.6686°W	4,885 feet (1,489 m)
Wilson	former post office			
Wood Valley	former post office			

== Rio Blanco County ==
Select the OpenStreetMap link at the right to view the location of places in this section.

Place	Type	ZIP Code	Location	Elevation
Angora	unincorporated community	81648	40.1766°N 108.5757°W	5,466 feet (1,666 m)
Buford	unincorporated community	81641	39.9872°N 107.6167°W	7,028 feet (2,142 m)
Camp at White River	see Fort Meeker			
Cantonment on White River	see Fort Meeker			
Farwell	former post office			
Fort Meeker	historic U.S. Army fort	81641		
Little Beaver	former post office			
Marvine	former post office			
Meeker† (Note: Meeker has been the seat of Rio Blanco County, Colorado since the county was created on March 25, 1889.)	statutory town	81641	40.0375°N 107.9131°W	6,240 feet (1,902 m)
Piceance	former post office			
Pyramid	former post office			
Rangely	statutory town	81648	40.0875°N 108.8048°W	5,233 feet (1,595 m)
Rangley	see Rangely			
Rio Blanco	unincorporated community	81650	39.7378°N 107.9454°W	7,267 feet (2,215 m)
Rioblanco	former post office	81650		
Sulphur	former post office			
Thornburgh	unincorporated community	81641	40.2069°N 107.6959°W	6,739 feet (2,054 m)
White River	former post office			
White River City	unincorporated community	81641	40.0908°N 108.2243°W	5,741 feet (1,750 m)

== Rio Grande County ==
Select the OpenStreetMap link at the right to view the location of places in this section.

Place	Type	ZIP Code	Location	Elevation
Alpine	census-designated place	81154	37.6892°N 106.5889°W	8,288 feet (2,526 m)
Ansel	unincorporated community	81125	37.7031°N 106.1025°W	7,651 feet (2,332 m)
Baxterville	unincorporated community	81154	37.6742°N 106.6578°W	8,235 feet (2,510 m)
Blainvale	former post office			
Bowen	former post office			
Center (Note: The Town of Center straddles both Saguache and Rio Grande counties.)	statutory town	81125	See also Center in Saguache County.	
Centerview	see Center			
Cornwall	former post office			
Del Norte† (Note: On February 10, 1874, the Territory of Colorado created Rio Grande County, Colorado Territory with Del Norte as the original county seat, until statehood on August 1, 1876, when Del Norte became the seat of Rio Grande County, Colorado.)	statutory town	81132	37.6789°N 106.3534°W	7,884 feet (2,403 m)
Dunul	unincorporated community	81144	37.6622°N 106.1025°W	7,651 feet (2,332 m)
Evansville	unincorporated community	81132	37.6711°N 106.3189°W	7,848 feet (2,392 m)
Gerrard	census-designated place	81154	37.6783°N 106.5752°W	8,123 feet (2,476 m)
Granger	former post office			
Hanna	unincorporated community	81132	37.6794°N 106.4589°W	7,995 feet (2,437 m)
Henry	see Monte Vista			
Homelake	unincorporated community	81135	37.5756°N 106.0970°W	7,638 feet (2,328 m)
Jasper	unincorporated community	81132	37.4178°N 106.4625°W	9,108 feet (2,776 m)
Lariat	see Monte Vista			
Liberty	see Parma			
Loma	former post office			
Maxeyville	unincorporated community	81144	37.6181°N 106.1495°W	7,677 feet (2,340 m)
Monte Vista	home rule city	81144, 81135	37.5792°N 106.1481°W	7,664 feet (2,336 m)
Nichols	former post office			
Norma	former post office			
Parma	unincorporated community	81144		
Perry	former post office			
Sevenmile Plaza	unincorporated community	81132	37.6481°N 106.2375°W	7,766 feet (2,367 m)
South Fork	statutory town	81154	37.6700°N 106.6398°W	8,209 feet (2,502 m)
Sugar Junction	unincorporated community	81144	37.5678°N 106.1125°W	7,644 feet (2,330 m)
Summit	see Summitville			
Summitville	ghost town	81132	37.4306°N 106.5923°W	11,286 feet (3,440 m)
Torres	unincorporated community	81144	37.6067°N 106.2045°W	7,707 feet (2,349 m)
Vastine	unincorporated community	81144	37.6344°N 106.1034°W	7,648 feet (2,331 m)
Zinzer	unincorporated community	81144	37.5603°N 106.0945°W	7,635 feet (2,327 m)

== Routt County ==
Select the OpenStreetMap link at the right to view the location of places in this section.

Place	Type	ZIP Code	Location	Elevation
Anthracite	former post office			
Barbee	former post office			
Battle Creek	unincorporated community	81653	41.0014°N 107.2451°W	6,706 feet (2,044 m)
Bear River	unincorporated community	80487	40.4839°N 107.1173°W	6,424 feet (1,958 m)
Brookston	former post office			
Cary Ranch	former post office			
Clark	unincorporated community	80428	40.7061°N 106.9192°W	7,260 feet (2,213 m)
Coalview	former post office			
Columbine	ghost town	80428	40.8541°N 106.9659°W	8,701 feet (2,652 m)
Conger	former post office			
Deepcreek	former post office			
Drygulch	former post office			
Dunckley	unincorporated community	81639	40.3008°N 107.1942°W	7,605 feet (2,318 m)
Dunkley	see Dunckley			
Eddy	former post office			
Edith	former post office			
Egeria	former post office			
Elkhead (1884)	ghost town			
Elkhead (1927)	former post office			
Elkhead	unincorporated community	81639	40.6486°N 107.2076°W	7,487 feet (2,282 m)
Eula	former post office			
Fort Fraeb	see Fraeb's Post			
Fortification	former post office			
Fraeb's Post	historic trading post	80428		
Glen Eden	unincorporated community	80428	40.7172°N 106.9150°W	7,274 feet (2,217 m)
Hahns Peak‡ (Note: Hahns Peak served as the seat of Routt County, Colorado from 1878 until 1912.)	see Hahns Peak Village			
Hahns Peak Village	unincorporated community	80428	40.8056°N 106.9442°W	8,132 feet (2,479 m)
Hardscrabble	former post office			
Harrison	former post office			
Haybro	ghost town	80467	40.3322°N 106.9595°W	7,297 feet (2,224 m)
Hayden‡ (Note: On January 29, 1877, the state created Routt County, Colorado and designated Hayden as the original county seat. Hayden served as county seat until 1878.)	home rule town	81639	40.4953°N 107.2573°W	6,348 feet (1,935 m)
Huggins	former post office			
Hydrate	former post office			
Junction City	see Haybro			
Keystone	unincorporated community	80467	40.3011°N 106.9631°W	7,326 feet (2,233 m)
Mad Creek	unincorporated community	80487	40.5661°N 106.8884°W	6,732 feet (2,052 m)
McGregor	unincorporated community	80487	40.4794°N 107.0351°W	6,503 feet (1,982 m)
Milner	unincorporated community	80487	40.4847°N 107.0195°W	6,522 feet (1,988 m)
Mobley	former post office			
Mount Harris	unincorporated community	80487	40.4836°N 107.1448°W	6,440 feet (1,963 m)
Mystic	ghost town	80487	40.5700°N 106.9959°W	6,900 feet (2,103 m)
Oak Creek	statutory town	80467	40.2750°N 106.9584°W	7,428 feet (2,264 m)
Pagoda	unincorporated community	81638	40.3369°N 107.4159°W	6,549 feet (1,996 m)
Pallas	former post office			
Pershing	former post office			
Phippsburg	census-designated place	80469		
Pinnacle	former post office			
Pool	see Milner			
Puma	former post office			
Routt	former post office			
Sidney	former post office			
Slavonia	unincorporated community	80480	40.7844°N 106.7042°W	9,797 feet (2,986 m)
Steamboat II	unincorporated community	80487	40.5080°N 106.9067°W	6,608 feet (2,014 m)
Steamboat Springs† (Note: Steamboat Springs has served as the seat of Routt County, Colorado since 1912.)	home rule city	80487-80488; 80477	40.4850°N 106.8317°W	6,732 feet (2,052 m)
Theisen	former post office			
Toponas	unincorporated community	80479	40.0603°N 106.8081°W	8,284 feet (2,525 m)
Tosh	former post office			
Trapper	unincorporated community	80483	40.1039°N 106.8798°W	8,018 feet (2,444 m)
Trout Creek	former post office			
Trull	former post office			
Willow Creek	former post office			
Yampa	statutory town	80483	40.1525°N 106.9087°W	7,881 feet (2,402 m)
Yarmony	former post office			

== Saguache County ==
Select the OpenStreetMap link at the right to view the location of places in this section.

Place	Type	ZIP Code	Location	Elevation
Alder	ghost town	81155	38.3694°N 106.0395°W	8,543 feet (2,604 m)
Biedell	former post office			
Bismark	former post office			
Bonanza	statutory town	81155	38.2947°N 106.1422°W	9,478 feet (2,889 m)
Bonanza City	see Bonanza			
Bonita	unincorporated community	81155	38.2328°N 106.2150°W	9,334 feet (2,845 m)
Bonito	former post office			
Carnero	former post office			
Center	statutory town	81125	37.7531°N 106.1086°W	7,644 feet (2,330 m)
Centerview	see Center			
Chester	unincorporated community	81155	38.3736°N 106.3017°W	9,400 feet (2,865 m)
Claytonia	former post office			
Cotton Creek	former post office			
Cottonwood	unincorporated community	81131	37.9344°N 105.6442°W	8,425 feet (2,568 m)
Crestone	statutory town	81131	37.9964°N 105.6997°W	7,930 feet (2,417 m)
Crookstown	former post office			
Crooksville	former post office			
Cuerin	former post office			
Duncan	ghost town	81252	37.8742°N 105.6145°W	8,107 feet (2,471 m)
Dune	former post office			
Embargo	former post office			
Exchequer	former post office			
Garibaldi	see Villa Grove			
Gibson	former post office			
Green	former post office			
Hauman	former post office			
Herad	former post office			
Iris	unincorporated community	81230	38.4161°N 106.8289°W	8,999 feet (2,743 m)
Kerper City	unincorporated community	81155	38.2828°N 106.1422°W	9,288 feet (2,831 m)
Kimbrell	former post office			
La Garita	unincorporated community	81132	37.8408°N 106.2467°W	7,828 feet (2,386 m)
Lanark	former post office			
Liberty	ghost town	81252	37.8603°N 105.5958°W	8,274 feet (2,522 m)
Lockett	former post office			
Los Mogotes	former post office			
Los Pinos	former post office			
Marshalltown	see Sargents			
Mineral Hot Springs	unincorporated community	81143	38.1689°N 105.9258°W	7,749 feet (2,362 m)
Mirage	unincorporated community	81143	38.1028°N 105.8645°W	7,657 feet (2,334 m)
Moffat	statutory town	81143	37.9989°N 105.9100°W	7,566 feet (2,306 m)
New Liberty	former post office			
Orient	former post office			
Oriental	former post office			
Parkville	unincorporated community	81155	38.2272°N 106.1006°W	8,720 feet (2,658 m)
Pruden	former post office			
Pyke	former post office			
Rio Alto	former post office			
Rito Alto	former post office			
Rock Cliff	former post office			
Round Hill	see Alder			
Saguache† (Note: On December 29, 1866, the Territory of Colorado created Saguache County, Colorado Territory with Saguache as the county seat, and since statehood on August 1, 1876, the seat of Saguache County, Colorado.) (Note: The name "Saguache" is pronounced /səˈwætʃ/. This name comes from the Ute language noun "sawup" /səˈwʌp/ meaning "sand dunes". The Spanish language version of this name is usually spelled "Saguache", while the English language version is usually spelled "Sawatch".)	statutory town	81149	38.0875°N 106.1420°W	7,703 feet (2,348 m)
San Isabel	former post office			
Sangre de Cristo	former post office			
Sargents	unincorporated community	81248	38.4042°N 106.4150°W	8,478 feet (2,584 m)
Schistos	former post office			
Sedgewick	unincorporated community	81155	38.2792°N 106.1478°W	9,232 feet (2,814 m)
Shirley	former post office			
Shistos	former post office			
Spanish	former post office			
Spook City	unincorporated community	81155	38.2300°N 106.1972°W	9,639 feet (2,938 m)
Tetons	former post office			
Veteran	former post office			
Villa Grove	unincorporated community	81155	38.2486°N 105.9492°W	7,982 feet (2,433 m)
Villagrove	see Villa Grove			
Wabash	former post office			
Watonga	former post office			
White Earth	former post office			

== San Juan County ==
Select the OpenStreetMap link at the right to view the location of places in this section.

Place	Type	ZIP Code	Location	Elevation
Animas Forks	ghost town	81433	37.9311°N 107.5714°W	11,184 feet (3,409 m)
Arastra (Note: Located at an elevation of 12,230 feet (3,728 m), Arastra, Colorado was the highest elevation town to ever have a United States post office.)	ghost town	81433	37.7928°N 107.6070°W	12,230 feet (3,728 m)
Arrastra	see Arastra			
Beartown	unincorporated community	81433	37.7228°N 107.5039°W	11,188 feet (3,410 m)
Cement Creek	former post office	81433		
Chattanooga	ghost town	81433	37.8736°N 107.7253°W	10,262 feet (3,128 m)
Congress	former post office	81433		
Del Mine	former post office	81433		
Eureka	ghost town	81433	37.8797°N 107.5651°W	9,862 feet (3,006 m)
Gladstone	unincorporated community	81433	37.8903°N 107.6503°W	10,505 feet (3,202 m)
Grassy Hill	former post office	81433		
Highland Mary	former post office	81433		
Howardsville‡ (Note: Howardsville served as the original seat of La Plata County, Colorado Territory since the county was created on February 10, 1874, until January 31, 1876.)	ghost town	81433	37.8356°N 107.5942°W	9,747 feet (2,971 m)
Jennison	former post office	81433		
Middleton	ghost town	81433	37.8550°N 107.5723°W	9,793 feet (2,985 m)
Mineral Point	former post office	81433		
Needleton	unincorporated community	81433	37.6406°N 107.6915°W	8,278 feet (2,523 m)
Niccora	former post office	81433		
Niegoldstown	former post office	81433		
Poughkeepsie	former post office	81433		
Silver Lake	see Arastra			
Silver Ledge	former post office	81433		
Silverton† (Note: On January 31, 1876, the Territory of Colorado created San Juan County, Colorado Territory with Silverton as the county seat, and since statehood on August 1 of that year, the seat of San Juan County, Colorado.)	statutory town	81433	37.8119°N 107.6645°W	9,308 feet (2,837 m)
Sylvanite	former post office	81433		
Timber Hill	former post office	81433		

== San Miguel County ==
Select the OpenStreetMap link at the right to view the location of places in this section.

Place	Type	ZIP Code	Location	Elevation
Alder Creek	former post office			
Alta	ghost town	81435	37.8864°N 107.8528°W	11,060 feet (3,371 m)
Ames	ghost town	81426	37.8647°N 107.8823°W	8,720 feet (2,658 m)
Aurora	see Dallas Divide			
Basin	unincorporated community	81431	38.0658°N 108.5368°W	6,529 feet (1,990 m)
Beards Corner	unincorporated community	81431	38.0658°N 108.6120°W	6,368 feet (1,941 m)
Bulkley	former post office			
Cedar	former post office			
Columbia‡ (Note: On July 26, 1880, Columbia changed its name to Telluride. Telluride has been the seat of San Miguel County, Colorado since the county was created on March 2, 1883.)	see Telluride			
Cornell	former post office			
Dinan	former post office			
Dry Diggings	former post office			
Egnar	unincorporated community	81325	37.9164°N 108.9401°W	7,329 feet (2,234 m)
Fall Creek	former post office			
Folsom	former post office			
Gladel	former post office	81325		
Hang Town	former post office			
Hanover	former post office			
Haskill	former post office			
Ilium	unincorporated community	81435	37.9297°N 107.8978°W	8,117 feet (2,474 m)
Keystone	unincorporated community	81435	37.9497°N 107.8776°W	8,681 feet (2,646 m)
Leonard	unincorporated community	81430	38.0639°N 108.0270°W	7,749 feet (2,362 m)
Leopard	see Sams			
Liberty Bell	unincorporated community	81435	37.9353°N 107.7956°W	8,829 feet (2,691 m)
Lime	unincorporated community	81435	37.9550°N 107.9309°W	7,936 feet (2,419 m)
Lizard Head	former post office			
Mountain Village	home rule town	81435	37.9314°N 107.8565°W	9,600 feet (2,926 m)
Newmire	former post office			
Noel	unincorporated community	81432	38.0997°N 107.9128°W	8,796 feet (2,681 m)
Norwood	statutory town	81423	38.1305°N 108.2923°W	7,011 feet (2,137 m)
Ophir	home rule town	81426	37.8569°N 107.8326°W	9,695 feet (2,955 m)
Ophir Loop	unincorporated community	81426	37.8597°N 107.8684°W	9,278 feet (2,828 m)
Pandora	ghost town	81435	37.9333°N 107.7856°W	8,953 feet (2,729 m)
Placerville	census-designated place	81430	38.0167°N 108.0534°W	7,316 feet (2,230 m)
Sams	unincorporated community	81430		
San Bernardo	former post office			
San Miguel	unincorporated community	80435	37.9469°N 107.8359°W	8,750 feet (2,667 m)
Sawpit	statutory town	81430	37.9953°N 108.0017°W	7,592 feet (2,314 m)
Seymour	see Sawpit			
Slick Rock	unincorporated community	81325		
Smuggler	former post office			
Sultana	former post office			
Telluride†	home rule town	81435	37.9375°N 107.8123°W	8,793 feet (2,680 m)
Tomboy	ghost town	81435	37.9367°N 107.7545°W	11,509 feet (3,508 m)
Trout Lake	former post office			
Vanadium	unincorporated community	81435	37.9669°N 107.9717°W	7,743 feet (2,360 m)
Vance	former post office			
Vance Junction	unincorporated community	81435	37.9355°N 107.8987°W	8,100 feet (2,469 m)
Wareville	former post office			
Wilson	former post office			

== Sedgwick County ==
Select the OpenStreetMap link at the right to view the location of places in this section.

Place	Type	ZIP Code	Location	Elevation
Camp Rankin	see Fort Sedgwick			
Denver Junction (Note: On May 26, 1886, Denver Junction changed its name to Julesburg. Julesburg has been the seat of Sedgwick County, Colorado since the county was created on April 9, 1889.)	see Julesburg			
Flora	former post office			
Fort Julesburg	historic trading post	80744	40.9430°N 102.3582°W	3,514 feet (1,071 m)
Fort Ranking	see Fort Sedgwick			
Fort Sedgwick	historic U.S. Army fort	80744	40.9430°N 102.3805°W	3,543 feet (1,080 m)
Henderson	see Sedgwick			
Julesburg (1860)	former post office	80737		
Julesburg (1864)	former post office	80737		
Julesburg†	statutory town	80738	40.9883°N 102.2644°W	3,478 feet (1,060 m)
Old Julesburg	see Fort Julesburg			
Ovid	statutory town	80744	40.9605°N 102.3880°W	3,530 feet (1,076 m)
Post at Julesburg	see Fort Sedgwick			
Sedgwick	statutory town	80749	40.9364°N 102.5255°W	3,586 feet (1,093 m)
Weir	see Julesburg			

== Summit County ==
Select the OpenStreetMap link at the right to view the location of places in this section.

Place	Type	ZIP Code	Location	Elevation
Adrian	former post office			
Argentine (1881)	former post office			
Argentine (1901)	former post office			
Blue River	statutory town	80424	39.4297°N 106.0439°W	10,036 feet (3,059 m)
Boreas	former post office			
Braddock	former post office			
Breckenridge† (Note: On November 28, 1859, the Provisional Government of the Territory of Jefferson created 12 counties, with Breckenridge as the seat of Saratoga County, Jefferson Territory. On January 18, 1860, the spelling of the town's name was changed to Breckinridge in honor of U.S. Vice President John Cabell Breckinridge. On December 2, 1861, after John Breckinridge accepted a commission as a brigadier general in the Confederate States Army, the town changed its name back to the original Breckenridge. In 1862, county voters selected Breckenridge as the new seat of Summit County, Colorado Territory, and since statehood on August 1, 1876, the seat of Summit County, Colorado.)	home rule town	80424	39.4817°N 106.0384°W	9,728 feet (2,965 m)
Breckinridge‡	see Breckenridge			
Buffer	former post office			
Carbonateville	former post office			
Chihuahua	former post office			
Coleyville	see Saints John			
Conger	former post office			
Copper Mountain	census-designated place	80443	39.4769°N 106.2011°W	11,362 feet (3,463 m)
Crocker	former post office			
Decatur	former post office			
Delaware City	former post office			
Dickey	former post office			
Dillon	home rule town	80435	39.6303°N 106.0434°W	9,111 feet (2,777 m)
Doenz Place	unincorporated community	80498	39.9050°N 106.4017°W	9,012 feet (2,747 m)
Dyersville	ghost town	80424	39.4205°N 105.9839°W	10,879 feet (3,316 m)
Farnham	former post office			
Fort Breckenridge	see Fort Mary B			
Fort Independence	see Fort Mary B			
Fort Independent	see Fort Mary B			
Fort Mary B	historic civilian stockade	80424		
Fort Mary Bigelow	see Fort Mary B			
Fort Meribeh	see Fort Mary B			
Frawley	former post office			
Frisco	home rule town	80443	39.5744°N 106.0975°W	9,075 feet (2,766 m)
Gold Hill	unincorporated community	80424	39.5453°N 106.0484°W	9,347 feet (2,849 m)
Haywood	former post office			
Heeney	census-designated place	80498	39.8740°N 106.3078°W	8,018 feet (2,444 m)
Josie	former post office			
Keystone	home rule town	80435	39.5994°N 105.9872°W	9,173 feet (2,796 m)
Kokomo	ghost town	80443	39.4242°N 106.1897°W	10,696 feet (3,260 m)
Lakeside	former post office			
Laurium	former post office			
Lincoln	unincorporated community	80424	39.4875°N 105.9856°W	10,236 feet (3,120 m)
Masontown	unincorporated community	80443	39.5664°N 106.1003°W	9,334 feet (2,845 m)
Montezuma	statutory town	80435	39.5811°N 105.8672°W	10,312 feet (3,143 m)
Naomi	former post office			
Paige City	former post office	80424		
Parkville‡ (Note: On November 1, 1861, the Territory of Colorado created 17 original counties, with Parkville as the original seat of Summit County, Colorado Territory. Parkville served as county seat until the following year.)	ghost town	80435	39.4989°N 105.9500°W	9,980 feet (3,042 m)
Peak Seven West	unincorporated community	80424	39.5000°N 106.0638°W	9,895 feet (3,016 m)
Plain	former post office			
Preston	ghost town	80424	39.4958°N 106.0211°W	10,371 feet (3,161 m)
Rathbone	former post office			
Rexford	ghost town	80435	39.5339°N 105.8958°W	11,430 feet (3,484 m)
Robinson	former post office			
Saints John	ghost town	80435	39.5717°N 105.8817°W	10,764 feet (3,281 m)
Silver Lake	former post office			
Silverthorne	home rule town	80497-80498	39.6321°N 106.0743°W	8,757 feet (2,669 m)
Slate Creek	unincorporated community	80498	39.7842°N 106.1634°W	8,205 feet (2,501 m)
Swan	former post office			
Swandyke	ghost town			
Ten Mile	former post office			
Tiger	ghost town	80424	39.5228°N 105.9621°W	9,669 feet (2,947 m)
Tordal Estates	unincorporated community	80424	39.3845°N 106.0504°W	10,653 feet (3,247 m)
Wapiti	former post office			
Wheeler	former post office			
Wheeler Junction	unincorporated community	80443	39.5061°N 106.1422°W	9,698 feet (2,956 m)
White River	former post office			

== Teller County ==
Select the OpenStreetMap link at the right to view the location of places in this section.

Place	Type	ZIP Code	Location	Elevation
Alnwick	former post office			
Altman	ghost town	80819	38.7361°N 105.1339°W	10,630 feet (3,240 m)
Anaconda	unincorporated community	80813	38.7319°N 105.1631°W	9,498 feet (2,895 m)
Arequa	former post office			
Barry	former post office			
Beacon Hill	unincorporated community	80813	38.7225°N 105.1650°W	9,524 feet (2,903 m)
Boaz	former post office			
Cameron	former post office			
Clyde	former post office			
Cripple City	see Gillett			
Cripple Creek† (Note: Fremont changed its name to Morland on December 9, 1891; then changed it back to Fremont on February 4, 1892; then changed it to Cripple Creek on June 20, 1892. Cripple Creek has been the seat of Teller County, Colorado since the county was created on March 23, 1899.)	statutory city	80813	38.7467°N 105.1783°W	9,455 feet (2,882 m)
Crystola	unincorporated community	80819	38.9558°N 105.0272°W	7,979 feet (2,432 m)
Divide	census-designated place	80814	38.9450°N 105.1619°W	9,117 feet (2,779 m)
Edlowe	former post office			
Elkton	unincorporated community	80860	38.7222°N 105.1505°W	9,770 feet (2,978 m)
Fairview	unincorporated community	80813	38.7439°N 105.1583°W	10,138 feet (3,090 m)
Florissant	census-designated place	80816	38.9446°N 105.2899°W	8,192 feet (2,497 m)
Fremont	see Cripple Creek			
Gillett	ghost town	80860	38.7819°N 105.1228°W	9,938 feet (3,029 m)
Gillette	see Gillett			
Goldfield	census-designated place	80819	38.7176°N 105.1253°W	9,931 feet (3,027 m)
Green Mountain Falls (Note: The Town of Green Mountain Falls straddles both El Paso and Teller counties.)	statutory town		See also Green Mountain Falls in El Paso County.	
Highpark	former post office			
Hobart	former post office	80860		
Hollywood	unincorporated community	81212	38.7094°N 105.1333°W	9,692 feet (2,954 m)
Independence	ghost town	80860	38.7322°N 105.1366°W	10,640 feet (3,243 m)
January	former post office			
Langdon	see Crystola			
Lawrence	former post office			
Love	former post office			
Macon	former post office			
Manitou Park	see Woodland Park			
Marigold	unincorporated community	80814	38.6611°N 105.2214°W	6,886 feet (2,099 m)
Midland	census-designated place	80813	38.8468°N 105.1579°W	9,406 feet (2,867 m)
Midway	unincorporated community	80813	38.7400°N 105.1428°W	10,433 feet (3,180 m)
Morland	see Cripple Creek			
Mound	former post office			
Mound City	unincorporated community	80813	38.7246°N 105.1769°W	9,180 feet (2,798 m)
Rosemont	unincorporated community	80860	38.7422°N 104.9569°W	9,823 feet (2,994 m)
Seven Lakes	ghost town	80860	38.7817°N 105.0086°W	10,984 feet (3,348 m)
Seward	former post office			
Stratton	unincorporated community	80813	38.7478°N 105.1500°W	10,394 feet (3,168 m)
Summit Park	see Woodland Park			
Tamarac	Woodland Park neighborhood			
Torrington	former post office			
Touraine	former post office	80860		
Victor	statutory city	80860	38.7100°N 105.1400°W	9,708 feet (2,959 m)
West Beaver Park	see Gillett			
Woodland Park	home rule city	80863, 80866	38.9939°N 105.0569°W	8,481 feet (2,585 m)

== Washington County ==
Select the OpenStreetMap link at the right to view the location of places in this section.

Place	Type	ZIP Code	Location	Elevation
Abbott	former post office			
Akron† (Note: Akron has been the seat of Washington County, Colorado since the county was created on February 9, 1887.)	statutory town	80720	40.1605°N 103.2144°W	4,659 feet (1,420 m)
Anton	unincorporated community	80801	39.7417°N 103.2172°W	4,869 feet (1,484 m)
Arickaree	unincorporated community	80801	39.6992°N 103.0660°W	4,715 feet (1,437 m)
Badger	former post office			
Brunker	former post office			
Burdett	unincorporated community	80743	40.3655°N 102.9510°W	4,262 feet (1,299 m)
Calhoun	unincorporated community	80743	40.1425°N 102.8905°W	4,268 feet (1,301 m)
Cope	census-designated place	80812	39.6639°N 102.8510°W	4,403 feet (1,342 m)
Corcoran	former post office			
Curtis	former post office			
De Nova	unincorporated community	80801	39.8589°N 102.9733°W	4,505 feet (1,373 m)
Dillingham	former post office			
Elba	unincorporated community	80720	39.9483°N 103.2183°W	4,705 feet (1,434 m)
Flat Top	former post office			
Fremont	former post office			
Glen	former post office			
Gray	former post office			
Harrisburg	see Lindon			
Henry	former post office			
Hyde	unincorporated community	80743	40.1358°N 102.8327°W	4,222 feet (1,287 m)
Last Chance	ghost town	80757	39.7408°N 103.5916°W	4,820 feet (1,469 m)
Leslie	former post office			
Lindon	unincorporated community	80740	39.7394°N 103.4138°W	4,918 feet (1,499 m)
Lone Star	unincorporated community	80743	40.3519°N 102.8513°W	4,206 feet (1,282 m)
Meekton	former post office			
Messex	unincorporated community	80741	40.4294°N 103.4366°W	4,088 feet (1,246 m)
Midway	unincorporated community	80720	40.2264°N 103.3977°W	4,449 feet (1,356 m)
Millet	see Platner			
Otis	statutory town	80743	40.1489°N 102.9630°W	4,341 feet (1,323 m)
Pinneo	ghost town	80720	40.2094°N 103.4386°W	4,364 feet (1,330 m)
Platner	unincorporated community	80743	40.1553°N 103.0674°W	4,432 feet (1,351 m)
Plum Bush	former post office			
Prairie	former post office			
Rago	unincorporated community	80720	40.0019°N 103.4155°W	4,564 feet (1,391 m)
Schlueter	former post office			
Spence	former post office			
Thurman	unincorporated community	80801	39.5961°N 103.2174°W	4,951 feet (1,509 m)
Townsend	former post office			
Waitley	former post office			
Wiladel	unincorporated community	80801	39.7430°N 103.0099°W	4,596 feet (1,401 m)
Woodrow	unincorporated community	80757	39.9883°N 103.5916°W	4,491 feet (1,369 m)
Xenia	unincorporated community	80483	40.1611°N 103.3449°W	4,534 feet (1,382 m)

== Weld County ==
Select the OpenStreetMap link at the right to view the location of places in this section.

Place	Type	ZIP Code	Location	Elevation
Aristocrat Ranchettes	census-designated place	80621	40.1091°N 104.7625°W	5,003 feet (1,525 m)
Auburn	unincorporated community	80631	40.3680°N 104.6366°W	4,652 feet (1,418 m)
Ault	statutory town	80610	40.5825°N 104.7319°W	4,938 feet (1,505 m)
Avalo	unincorporated community	80754	40.8033°N 103.6502°W	4,521 feet (1,378 m)
Bergdorf	see Ault			
Berthoud (Note: The Town of Berthoud straddles both Larimer and Weld counties.)	statutory town	80513	See also Berthoud in Larimer County.	
Briggsdale	census-designated place	80611	40.6347°N 104.3269°W	4,865 feet (1,483 m)
Brighton (Note: Brighton has been the seat of Adams County, Colorado since the county was created on November 15, 1902. The City of Brighton now also extends into Weld County.)	home rule city	80601-80603; 80640	See also Brighton in Adams County.	
Carr	unincorporated community	80612	40.8961°N 104.8750°W	5,712 feet (1,741 m)
Cherokee City (Note: On November 25, 1863, Cherokee City changed its name to Latham. Latham served as the seat of Weld County, Colorado Territory from 1868 until 1870.)	see Evans			
Clearwater	former post office			
Cornish	unincorporated community	80611	40.5230°N 104.4133°W	4,715 feet (1,437 m)
Dacono	home rule city	80514	40.0847°N 104.9394°W	5,023 feet (1,531 m)
Dearfield	ghost town		40.2905°N 104.2594°W	4,498 feet (1,371 m)
Eaton	statutory town	80615	40.5303°N 104.7114°W	4,839 feet (1,475 m)
Eatonton	see Eaton			
Elwell	unincorporated community		40.3361°N 104.9419°W	4,944 feet (1,507 m)
Erie (Note: The Town of Erie straddles both Weld and Boulder counties.)	statutory town	80516, 80514	See also Erie in Boulder County.	
Evans‡ (Note: Evans served as the seat of Weld County, Colorado Territory from 1870 until 1874 and again from 1875 until statehood on August 1, 1876, when it became the seat of Weld County, Colorado until the following year.)	home rule city	80620, 80634; 80645	40.3764°N 104.6922°W	4,652 feet (1,418 m)
Evanston	unincorporated community	80530	40.1069°N 104.9386°W	4,964 feet (1,513 m)
Firestone	statutory town	80520, 80504	40.1125°N 104.9366°W	4,970 feet (1,515 m)
Fort George	see Fort Saint Vrain			
Fort Gerry	historic trading post	80644		
Fort Jackson	historic trading post	80621		
Fort Lawrence	see Fort Lupton (1836)			
Fort Lookout	see Fort Saint Vrain			
Fort Lupton	statutory city	80621	40.0847°N 104.8130°W	4,905 feet (1,495 m)
Fort Lupton (1836)	historic trading post	80621		
Fort Saint Vrain	historic trading post	80651	40.2789°N 104.8550°W	4,764 feet (1,452 m)
Fort Vasquez	historic trading post	80651		
Frederick	statutory town	80530, 80504; 80516	40.0992°N 104.9372°W	4,980 feet (1,518 m)
Galeton	unincorporated community	80622	40.5208°N 104.5858°W	4,770 feet (1,454 m)
Garden City	statutory town	80631	40.3939°N 104.6894°W	4,698 feet (1,432 m)
Gilcrest	statutory town	80623	40.2819°N 104.7777°W	4,754 feet (1,449 m)
Gill	unincorporated community	80624	40.4541°N 104.5422°W	4,685 feet (1,428 m)
Greeley† (Note: Greeley served as the seat of Weld County, Colorado Territory from 1874 until 1875. Greeley has served as the seat of Weld County, Colorado since 1877.)	home rule city	80631-80639	40.4233°N 104.7091°W	4,675 feet (1,425 m)
Grover	statutory town	80729	40.8714°N 104.2252°W	5,075 feet (1,547 m)
Hereford	unincorporated community	80732	40.9750°N 104.3058°W	5,279 feet (1,609 m)
Highland Lake	unincorporated community	80542	40.2478°N 105.0144°W	5,072 feet (1,546 m)
Highlandlake	former post office	80542		
Hudson	statutory town	80642	40.0736°N 104.6430°W	5,000 feet (1,524 m)
Ione	unincorporated community	80621		
Johnstown (Note: The Town of Johnstown straddles both Weld and Larimer counties.)	home rule town	80534	40.3369°N 104.9122°W	4,852 feet (1,479 m)
Keenesburg	statutory town	80643	40.1083°N 104.5200°W	4,954 feet (1,510 m)
Keota	ghost town	80729	40.7028°N 104.0752°W	4,964 feet (1,513 m)
Kersey	statutory town	80644	40.3875°N 104.5616°W	4,616 feet (1,407 m)
La Salle (Note: The La Salle post office serves the Town of LaSalle.) (Note: The Town of La Salle changed the spelling of its name to LaSalle, although the State of Colorado, the United States Postal Service, and the United States Census Bureau continue to use the original spelling.)	post office	80645		
LaSalle	statutory town	80645	40.3489°N 104.7019°W	4,678 feet (1,426 m)
Latham‡	see Evans			
Lochbuie (Note: The Town of Lochbuie straddles both Weld and Adams counties.)	statutory town	80603	40.0072°N 104.7161°W	5,020 feet (1,530 m)
Longmont (Note: The City of Longmont straddles both Boulder and Weld counties.)	home rule city	80501-80504	See also Longmont in Boulder County.	
Lucerne	unincorporated community	80646	40.4819°N 104.6997°W	4,751 feet (1,448 m)
Mead	statutory town	80542	40.2333°N 104.9986°W	5,003 feet (1,525 m)
Milliken	statutory town	80543	40.3294°N 104.8553°W	4,751 feet (1,448 m)
Nantes	see Gilcrest			
New Liberty	former post office			
New Raymer	unincorporated community	80742	40.6067°N 103.8438°W	4,774 feet (1,455 m)
New Wattenberg	see Wattenberg			
Northglenn (Note: The City of Northglenn straddles both Adams and Weld counties.)	home rule city	80233-80234; 80241, 80260	See also Northglenn in Adams County.	
Nunn	statutory town	80648	40.7036°N 104.7808°W	5,190 feet (1,582 m)
Orr	see Kersey			
Pierce	statutory town	80650	40.6355°N 104.7552°W	5,036 feet (1,535 m)
Platteville	statutory town	80651	40.2150°N 104.8227°W	4,813 feet (1,467 m)
Prospect Valley	unincorporated community	80643	40.0736°N 104.4150°W	4,846 feet (1,477 m)
Puritan	unincorporated community	80516	40.0850°N 104.9991°W	5,023 feet (1,531 m)
Raymer	statutory town	80742	40.6080°N 103.8425°W	4,777 feet (1,456 m)
Roggen	unincorporated community	80652	40.1675°N 104.3722°W	4,711 feet (1,436 m)
Saint Vrain‡ (Note: On November 28, 1859, the Provisional Government of the Territory of Jefferson created 12 counties, with Saint Vrain as the seat of St. Vrain County, Jefferson Territory. On November 1, 1861, the new Territory of Colorado created 17 original counties, with Saint Vrain as the original seat of Weld County, Colorado Territory, serving until 1868.)	ghost town	80651	40.2770°N 104.8527°W	4,764 feet (1,452 m)
Saint Vrains	unincorporated community	80516	40.0369°N 104.9547°W	5,108 feet (1,557 m)
Serene	ghost town			
Severance	statutory town	80546	40.5241°N 104.8511°W	4,888 feet (1,490 m)
Sligo	former post office			
Sloan	unincorporated community	80643	40.0516°N 104.4880°W	4,921 feet (1,500 m)
Stoneham	unincorporated community	80754	40.6055°N 103.6666°W	4,583 feet (1,397 m)
Tailholt	see Severance			
Thornton (Note: The City of Thornton straddles both Adams and Weld counties.)	home rule city	80241, 80023, 80221, 80229, 80233, 80260, 80602	See also Thornton in Adams County.	
Timnath (Note: The Town of Timnath straddles both Larimer and Weld counties.)	home rule town	80547	See also Timnath in Larimer County.	
Wattenberg	unincorporated community	80621	40.0278°N 104.8366°W	4,938 feet (1,505 m)
Weld (1869)	see Fort Lupton			
Weld (1900)	former post office			
Windsor (Note: The Town of Windsor straddles both Weld and Larimer counties.)	home rule town	80550-80551	40.4775°N 104.9014°W	4,797 feet (1,462 m)
Zita	see Galeton			

== Yuma County ==
Select the OpenStreetMap link at the right to view the location of places in this section.

Place	Type	ZIP Code	Location	Elevation
Abarr	unincorporated community	80759	39.8505°N 102.7072°W	4,242 feet (1,293 m)
Alva	see Idalia			
Alvin	unincorporated community	80758	40.3078°N 102.0757°W	3,599 feet (1,097 m)
Armel	unincorporated community	80758	39.7972°N 102.1082°W	3,809 feet (1,161 m)
Arnold	former post office			
Avoca	former post office			
Beecher	see Beecher Island			
Beecher Island	former post office	80758	39.8722°N 102.1844°W	3,517 feet (1,072 m)
Black Wolf	former post office			
Bolton	former post office			
Bryant	former post office			
Clarkville	ghost town	80759	40.3950°N 102.6260°W	4,016 feet (1,224 m)
Condon	see Vernon			
Eckley	statutory town	80727	40.1139°N 102.4908°W	3,894 feet (1,187 m)
Ford	former post office			
Fox	former post office			
Friend	former post office			
Glory	see Beecher Island			
Gurney	former post office			
Hale	unincorporated community	80735	39.6297°N 102.1427°W	3,606 feet (1,099 m)
Happyville	former post office	80727		
Heartstrong	unincorporated community	80727	39.9475°N 102.5769°W	4,072 feet (1,241 m)
Hermes	former post office			
Hughes	former post office			
Idalia	census-designated place	80735	39.7029°N 102.2938°W	3,967 feet (1,209 m)
Joes	census-designated place	80822	39.6559°N 102.6785°W	4,275 feet (1,303 m)
Kirk	census-designated place	80824	39.6127°N 102.5920°W	4,203 feet (1,281 m)
Laird	census-designated place	80758	40.0818°N 102.1019°W	3,406 feet (1,038 m)
Landsman	former post office			
Lansing	former post office			
Logan	former post office			
Ludlam	former post office			
Mildred	former post office			
Newton	former post office			
Robb	unincorporated community	80758	40.1025°N 102.3719°W	3,724 feet (1,135 m)
Rogers	former post office			
Schramm	unincorporated community	80759	40.1139°N 102.6060°W	4,022 feet (1,226 m)
Seebarsee	see Laird			
Shields	former post office			
Steffens	former post office			
Vernon	census-designated place	80755	39.9400°N 102.3074°W	3,875 feet (1,181 m)
Wages	former post office			
Wales	former post office			
Wauneta	unincorporated community	80758	40.2930°N 102.2546°W	3,724 feet (1,135 m)
Witherbee	former post office			
Wray† (Note: Wray has served as the seat of Yuma County, Colorado since 1902.)	home rule city	80758	40.0758°N 102.2232°W	3,563 feet (1,086 m)
Yuma‡ (Note: Yuma served as the original seat of Yuma County, Colorado from the creation of the county on March 15, 1889, until 1902.)	home rule city	80759	40.1222°N 102.7252°W	4,137 feet (1,261 m)

- Adams
- Alamosa
- Arapahoe
- Archuleta
- Baca
- Bent
- Boulder
- Broomfield
- Chaffee
- Cheyenne
- Clear Creek
- Conejos
- Costilla
- Crowley
- Custer
- Delta
- Denver
- Dolores
- Douglas
- Eagle
- El Paso
- Elbert
- Fremont
- Garfield
- Gilpin
- Grand
- Gunnison
- Hinsdale
- Huerfano
- Jackson
- Jefferson
- Kiowa
- Kit Carson
- La Plata
- Lake
- Larimer
- Las Animas
- Lincoln
- Logan
- Mesa
- Mineral
- Moffat
- Montezuma
- Montrose
- Morgan
- Otero
- Ouray
- Park
- Phillips
- Pitkin
- Prowers
- Pueblo
- Rio Blanco
- Rio Grande
- Routt
- Saguache
- San Juan
- San Miguel
- Sedgwick
- Summit
- Teller
- Washington
- Weld
- Yuma

== See also ==
- Bibliography of Colorado
- Geography of Colorado
- History of Colorado
- Index of Colorado-related articles
- List of Colorado-related lists
  - List of counties in Colorado
  - List of populated places in Colorado
- Outline of Colorado
