= Skull Creek, Colorado =

Unincorporated community in Colorado, US

Skull Creek is an unincorporated community in Moffat County, in the U.S. state of Colorado.

== History ==
Skull Creek was founded sometime between 1910 and 1954. The settlement was named after a nearby creek, which is also named Skull Creek.

A dinosaur fossil, nicknamed "Zephyr", was discovered by construction workers nearby in 2019.

The post office in Dinosaur serves Blue Mountain addresses.
