= Elk Springs, Colorado =

Unincorporated community in Colorado, US

- Unincorporated community
- Location of Elk Springs, Colorado. Elk Springs (Colorado)
- Coordinates: 40°21′20″N 108°26′54″W
- Country: United States
- State: Colorado
- County: Moffat

Government
  - Type: unincorporated community
  - Body: Moffat County
- Elevation: 6,378 ft (1,944 m)
- Time zone: UTC−07:00 (MST)
  - Summer (DST): UTC−06:00 (MDT)
- ZIP code: (Dinosaur) 81633
- Area codes: 970/748
- GNIS place ID: 170958

Elk Springs is an unincorporated community located in and governed by Moffat County, Colorado, United States. The community is located in the Steamboat Springs, CO Micropolitan Statistical Area.

== History ==
The Elk Springs, Colorado, post office operated from June 9, 1924, until May 6, 1966. The Dinosaur, Colorado, post office (ZIP code 81633) now serves Elk Springs postal addresses.

== Geography ==
Elk Springs is located in southern Moffat County.

== See also ==
- Steamboat Springs, CO Micropolitan Statistical Area
- List of populated places in Colorado
- List of post offices in Colorado
