= Blue Mountain, Colorado =

Unincorporated community in Moffat County, Colorado, United States

- unincorporated community
- Location of Blue Mountain, Colorado Blue Mountain (Colorado)
- Coordinates: 40°14′58″N 108°51′43″W
- Country: United States
- State: Colorado
- County: Moffat

Government
  - Type: unincorporated community
  - Body: Moffat County
- Elevation: 5,824 ft (1,775 m)
- Time zone: UTC−07:00 (MST)
  - Summer (DST): UTC−06:00 (MDT)
- GNIS feature ID: 201958

Blue Mountain is an unincorporated community in Moffat County, in the U.S. state of Colorado. Blue Mountain is located on U.S. highway route 40.

== History ==
Blue Mountain was founded sometime after 1910. The Blue Mountain, Colorado, post office operated from September 1, 1949, until January 31, 1957. Blue Mountain is named for a nearby mountain, which is also called Blue Mountain.

The post office in Dinosaur (ZIP code 81610) now serves Blue Mountain addresses.

== See also ==
- Craig, CO Micropolitan Statistical Area
