= Massadona, Colorado =

Unincorporated community in Colorado, United States

Coordinates: 40°15′10″N 108°38′25″W

Massadona is an unincorporated community in Moffat County, in the U.S. state of Colorado.

== History ==
Massadona was founded sometime prior to 1907, and was known as Boxelder. Although the origin of the name Massadona is unknown, it is possible that the original name of Boxelder came from a local creek, which is called Box Elder Creek. The name was changed between 1910 and 1954, possibly to avoid confusion with Box Elder in Adams County.

The post office in Dinosaur serves Massadona addresses.

== Climate ==
According to the Köppen Climate Classification system, Massadona has a cold semi-arid climate, abbreviated "BSk" on climate maps. The hottest temperature recorded in Massadona was 102 °F (38.9 °C) on July 21, 2005, while the coldest temperature recorded was −29 °F (−33.9 °C) on December 22, 1990.

Climate data for Massadona, Colorado, 1991–2020 normals, extremes 1986–2009
Month	Jan	Feb	Mar	Apr	May	Jun	Jul	Aug	Sep	Oct	Nov	Dec	Year
Record high °F (°C)	56 (13)	62 (17)	77 (25)	81 (27)	95 (35)	96 (36)	102 (39)	100 (38)	93 (34)	82 (28)	68 (20)	62 (17)	102 (39)
Mean daily maximum °F (°C)	33.0 (0.6)	38.9 (3.8)	50.8 (10.4)	59.2 (15.1)	68.7 (20.4)	81.6 (27.6)	88.3 (31.3)	86.0 (30.0)	76.5 (24.7)	62.1 (16.7)	46.7 (8.2)	33.7 (0.9)	60.5 (15.8)
Daily mean °F (°C)	22.4 (−5.3)	27.1 (−2.7)	38.3 (3.5)	45.6 (7.6)	55.0 (12.8)	65.7 (18.7)	72.6 (22.6)	70.4 (21.3)	61.4 (16.3)	48.5 (9.2)	35.4 (1.9)	22.8 (−5.1)	47.1 (8.4)
Mean daily minimum °F (°C)	11.8 (−11.2)	15.3 (−9.3)	25.8 (−3.4)	32.0 (0.0)	41.3 (5.2)	49.7 (9.8)	56.9 (13.8)	54.8 (12.7)	46.3 (7.9)	34.9 (1.6)	24.0 (−4.4)	12.0 (−11.1)	33.7 (1.0)
Record low °F (°C)	−7 (−22)	−25 (−32)	−8 (−22)	7 (−14)	20 (−7)	28 (−2)	41 (5)	37 (3)	22 (−6)	0 (−18)	−8 (−22)	−29 (−34)	−29 (−34)
Average precipitation inches (mm)	1.09 (28)	1.03 (26)	1.25 (32)	1.32 (34)	1.59 (40)	0.85 (22)	0.97 (25)	0.96 (24)	1.56 (40)	1.63 (41)	1.04 (26)	1.08 (27)	14.37 (365)
Average snowfall inches (cm)	13.3 (34)	8.1 (21)	4.6 (12)	2.9 (7.4)	1.0 (2.5)	0.0 (0.0)	0.0 (0.0)	0.0 (0.0)	0.0 (0.0)	4.3 (11)	6.9 (18)	10.1 (26)	51.2 (131.9)
Average precipitation days (≥ 0.01 in)	7.5	7.4	6.6	8.5	8.0	5.7	4.9	7.0	6.7	6.6	5.7	5.6	80.2
Average snowy days (≥ 0.1 in)	6.6	5.5	3.1	2.2	0.4	0.0	0.0	0.0	0.0	1.5	3.9	4.8	28.0
Source 1: NOAA
Source 2: XMACIS2
