= Axial, Colorado =

Ghost town in Moffat County, Colorado, United States

- ghost town
- Location of Axial, Colorado. Axial (Colorado)
- Coordinates: 40.2853°N 107.7920°W
- Country: United States
- State: Colorado
- County: Moffat
- Elevation: 6,454 ft (1,967 m)
- Time zone: UTC−07:00 (MST)
  - Summer (DST): UTC−06:00 (MDT)
- GNIS pop ID: 171423

Axial is an extinct coal mining town located in Moffat County, Colorado, United States.

== History ==
The Axial, Colorado, post office operated from March 6, 1883, until April 30, 1958. The community's central location near the "axis" of mining activity caused the name to be selected.

== See also ==
- Craig, CO Micropolitan Statistical Area
- List of ghost towns in Colorado
- List of post offices in Colorado
