= Moffat County, Colorado =

County in Colorado, United States

- County
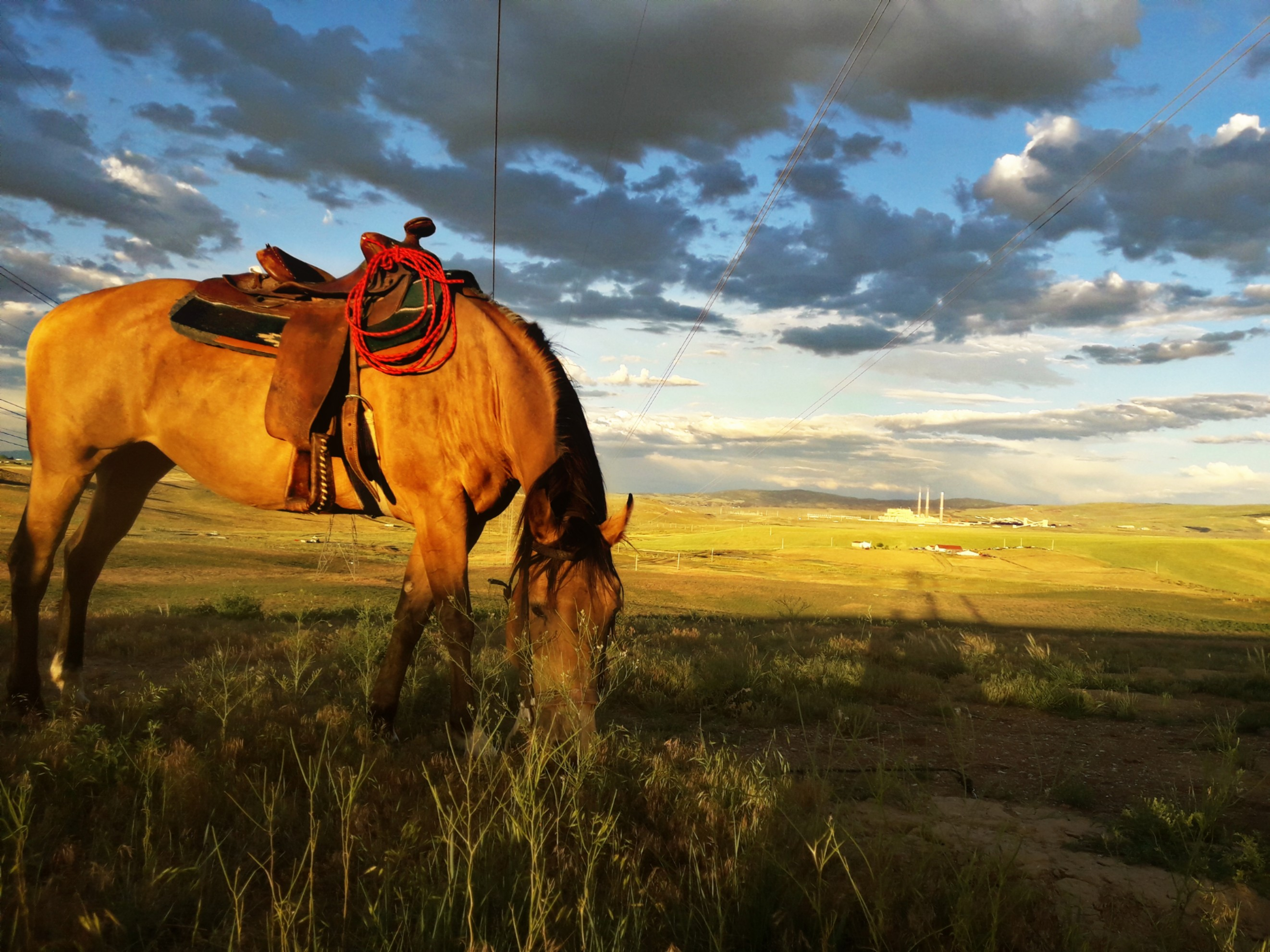
- Round Bottom Area in Moffat County, Colorado

- Location within the U.S. state of Colorado
- Coordinates: 40.61°N 108.20°W
- Country: United States
- State: Colorado
- Founded: February 27, 1911
- Named for: David H. Moffat
- Seat: Craig
- Largest city: Craig

Area
  - Total: 4,751 sq mi (12,310 km^{2})
  - Land: 4,743 sq mi (12,280 km^{2})
  - Water: 7.6 sq mi (20 km^{2}) 0.2%

Population (2020)
  - Total: 13,292
  - Estimate (2025): 13,122 ▼
  - Density: 2.802/sq mi (1.082/km^{2})
- Time zone: UTC−7 (Mountain)
  - Summer (DST): UTC−6 (MDT)
- Congressional district: 3rd
- Website: moffatcounty.colorado.gov

Moffat County is a county located in the U.S. state of Colorado. As of the 2020 census, the population was 13,292. The county seat is Craig. With an area of 4,751 square miles, it is the second-largest county by area in Colorado, behind Las Animas County.

Moffat County comprises the Craig, CO, Micropolitan Statistical Area, which is also included in the Steamboat Springs–Craig, CO, Combined Statistical Area.

== History ==
=== Displacement of the native people ===
The first recorded humans in northwestern Colorado were the Ute tribes. The Spanish expedition of Dominguez–Escalante of 1776 reached just south of what would become Moffat County, describing the area and inhabitants, but did not offer detailed information. In the early 1820s, William H. Ashley organized a major expedition of trappers into the Green River area of the county beginning the first use of the area's resources by Europeans. John C. Fremont would lead the first organized exploration of Moffat County on his return from California during his second expedition. His party crossed into the future Moffat County on June 6, 1844.

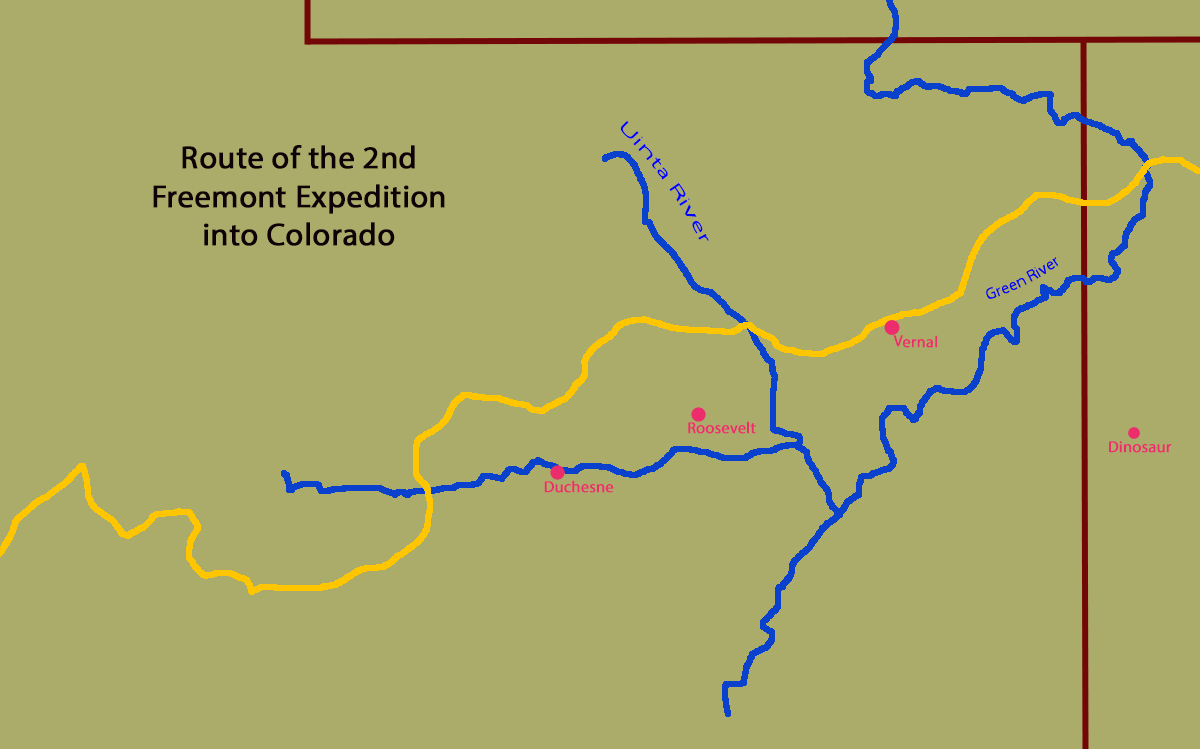
Freemont's 2nd Expedition return route across eastern Utah into northwestern Colorado

Despite the encroachment by trappers, miners, and explorers, the Ute Treaty of 1868 (a.k.a. The Kit Carson Treaty) and the Brunot Treaty of 1873 identified northwestern Colorado as part of the Ute nation and 'agencies' were established to act as representatives of the U.S. government within the Ute Nation. In 1879, a new agent, Nathan Meeker, was appointed to serve at the White River Agency in northwestern Colorado. Meeker had founded a Christian-based European agricultural colony in 1870 in eastern Colorado and had strong ideas of how a community should be structured. As the "Indian Agent" he felt compelled to change the nomadic lifestyle of the Ute Indians and attempted to "civilize" them by converting them into farmers. His efforts to impose an agricultural lifestyle on the native people created a conflict that ultimately led to the murder of Meeker and all of the staff at the Agency. The U.S. government's reaction to the massacre resulted in the relocation of most of the Ute tribes to Utah by force. After the removal of the Ute tribes, the U.S. government opened up northwestern Colorado for mining, commercial cattle ranching, and homesteading.

=== Northwestern Colorado County reorganizations of territory/state ===
In 1861, the Colorado Territory was organized and northwestern Colorado became Summit County. In 1874, Grand County was created out of the northern half of Summit County, and in 1877, Grand County was further subdivided, creating Routt County. It would be another 34 years before Moffat County would be carved out of the western portion of Routt County. The county was named for David H. Moffat, a Colorado tycoon who died in 1911.

=== Development and growth ===
David Moffat had been the primary force driving the establishment of a railroad from Denver to Salt Lake City. He established the Denver, Northwestern & Pacific Railway, and attempted to build a route from Denver to Salt Lake City. Construction on the 'Moffat Road' track began in the early 1900s but it faced constant delays and challenges. It finally reached Moffat County in 1913, ending in the town of Craig. The railroad was important for cattle ranchers in Moffat County's early years; however, the track was never extended into Utah. In 1934, another more direct route was established to Salt Lake City, and Moffat County remained a branch line and never part of the main commerce rail artery between Denver and Salt Lake City.

In the 1920s, U.S. 40, a major cross-country highway, began construction. The route selected put Moffat County, and the County Seat of Craig on the 'Victory Highway' and almost exactly halfway between Denver and Salt Lake City. In 1938, the final section over the Rocky Mountains was completed and paved, with the exception of Rabbit Ears Pass in Routt County, which was paved by 1950. This expanded Craig's economy by adding lodging and tourism. Moffat County was excluded from the initial Interstate Highway System plans as I-80 was routed through southern Wyoming and I-70 was planned to end in Denver and not cross the Rocky Mountains. Then Colorado Governor and former Moffat County resident, Edwin C. Johnson lobbied for I-70 to continue through Denver and connect to Salt Lake City. Eventually, the federal highway agency approved I-70 to continue through Colorado but routed it through Grand Junction, Colorado, leaving Moffat County as a secondary highway isolated between the two main east/west Interstate arteries.

The population in Moffat County stabilized at just over 5,000 people by the first census in 1920; however, it remained stagnant until the 1970s when construction of three coal-fired electrical power plants began. Those three plants are now scheduled to be closed in 2025, 2028, and 2030, respectively, creating a severe impact on the county's economy. Beyond the energy industries, Moffat County's ranching, agricultural, and tourism industries round out its primary economy. The 2020 census data showed the population at 13,292 people, which is almost the same as the county's post-power plant boom in the 1980s.

== Geography ==
According to the U.S. Census Bureau, the county has a total area of 4,751 square miles (12,310 km^{2}), of which 4,743 square miles (12,280 km^{2}) is land and 7.6 square miles (20 km^{2}) (0.2%) is water. It is the second-largest county by area in Colorado.

=== Adjacent counties ===
- Routt County – east
- Rio Blanco County – south
- Uintah County, Utah – west
- Daggett County, Utah – west
- Sweetwater County, Wyoming – north
- Carbon County, Wyoming – north

=== Major highways ===
- U.S. Highway 40
- State Highway 13
- State Highway 317
- State Highway 318
- State Highway 394
- Wyoming Highway 70

=== National protected areas ===
- Browns Park National Wildlife Refuge
- Dinosaur National Monument
- Routt National Forest
- White River National Forest
- Yampa River State Park

=== Scenic byway ===
- Dinosaur Diamond Prehistoric Highway National Scenic Byway

=== Summit ===
- Cold Spring Mountain

== Demographics ==
Historical population
Census	Pop.	Note	%±
1920	5,129		—
1930	4,861		−5.2%
1940	5,086		4.6%
1950	5,946		16.9%
1960	7,061		18.8%
1970	6,525		−7.6%
1980	13,133		101.3%
1990	11,357		−13.5%
2000	13,184		16.1%
2010	13,795		4.6%
2020	13,292		−3.6%
2025 (est.)	13,122	▼	−1.3%
U.S. Decennial Census; 1790–1960 1900–1990; 1990–2000 2010–2020

=== 2020 census ===
As of the 2020 census, the county had a population of 13,292. Of the residents, 24.8% were under the age of 18 and 16.3% were 65 years of age or older; the median age was 38.6 years. For every 100 females there were 105.4 males, and for every 100 females age 18 and over there were 103.4 males. 72.6% of residents lived in urban areas and 27.4% lived in rural areas.

Moffat County, Colorado – Racial and ethnic composition Note: the US Census treats Hispanic/Latino as an ethnic category. This table excludes Latinos from the racial categories and assigns them to a separate category. Hispanics/Latinos may be of any race.
Race / Ethnicity (NH = Non-Hispanic)	Pop 2000	Pop 2010	Pop 2020	% 2000	% 2010	% 2020
White alone (NH)	11,626	11,412	10,313	88.18%	82.73%	77.59%
Black or African American alone (NH)	17	32	77	0.13%	0.23%	0.58%
Native American or Alaska Native alone (NH)	100	98	98	0.76%	0.71%	0.74%
Asian alone (NH)	42	76	52	0.32%	0.55%	0.39%
Pacific Islander alone (NH)	2	7	2	0.02%	0.05%	0.02%
Other race alone (NH)	2	11	60	0.02%	0.08%	0.45%
Mixed race or Multiracial (NH)	148	174	566	1.12%	1.26%	4.26%
Hispanic or Latino (any race)	1,247	1,985	2,124	9.46%	14.39%	15.98%
Total	13,184	13,795	13,292	100.00%	100.00%	100.00%

The racial makeup of the county was 81.8% White, 0.6% Black or African American, 1.2% American Indian and Alaska Native, 0.4% Asian, 0.0% Native Hawaiian and Pacific Islander, 5.9% from some other race, and 10.1% from two or more races. Hispanic or Latino residents of any race comprised 16.0% of the population.

There were 5,352 households in the county, of which 32.2% had children under the age of 18 living with them and 21.5% had a female householder with no spouse or partner present. About 27.4% of all households were made up of individuals and 10.6% had someone living alone who was 65 years of age or older.

There were 6,091 housing units, of which 12.1% were vacant. Among occupied housing units, 68.5% were owner-occupied and 31.5% were renter-occupied. The homeowner vacancy rate was 2.1% and the rental vacancy rate was 9.4%.

=== 2000 census ===
As of the census of 2000, there were 13,184 people, 4,983 households, and 3,577 families residing in the county. The population density was 3 people per square mile (1.2 people/km^{2}). There were 5,635 housing units at an average density of 1 units per square mile (0.39 units/km^{2}). The racial makeup of the county was 93.61% White, 0.21% Black or African American, 0.88% Native American, 0.33% Asian, 0.02% Pacific Islander, 3.17% from other races, and 1.77% from two or more races; 9.46% of the population were Hispanic or Latino of any race.

There were 4,983 households, out of which 38.20% had children under the age of 18 living with them, 58.70% were married couples living together, 8.20% had a female householder with no husband present, and 28.20% were non-families. 23.60% of all households were made up of individuals, and 8.10% had someone living alone who was 65 years of age or older. The average household size was 2.58 and the average family size was 3.05.

In the county, the population was spread out, with 28.50% under the age of 18, 8.60% from 18 to 24, 29.90% from 25 to 44, 23.80% from 45 to 64, and 9.40% who were 65 years of age or older. The median age was 35 years. For every 100 females, there were 107.70 males. For every 100 females age 18 and over, there were 106.20 males.

The median income for a household in the county was $41,528, and the median income for a family was $45,511. Males had a median income of $37,288 versus $22,080 for females. The per capita income for the county was $18,540. About 6.90% of families and 8.30% of the population were below the poverty line, including 8.30% of those under age 18 and 9.30% of those age 65 or over.

== Communities ==
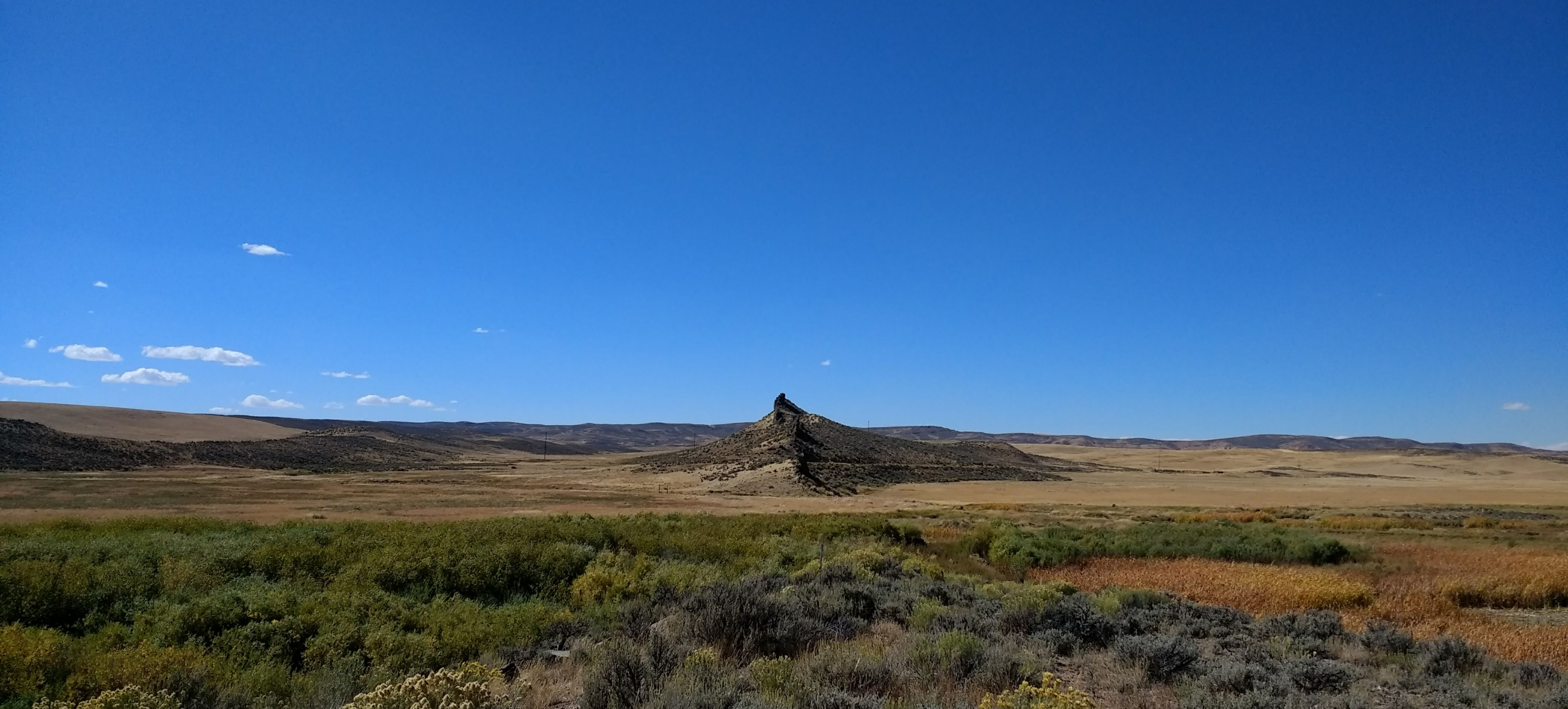
Fortification Rocks in Moffat County are a volcanic uplifts just to the west of Colorado State Highway 13.

=== City ===
- Craig

=== Town ===
- Dinosaur

=== Census-designated place ===
- Maybell

=== Other unincorporated places ===
- Blue Mountain
- Elk Springs
- Greystone
- Hamilton
- Lay
- Loyd
- Massadona
- Skull Creek
- Slater
- Sunbeam

=== Ghost towns ===
- Axial
- Cross Mountain

== Politics ==
Moffat is a Republican county in presidential elections. No Democratic presidential candidate has carried Moffat County since Lyndon Johnson's 1964 landslide, and indeed no Democrat post-1964 has obtained even 40 percent of the county's vote. Moffat was one of 15 counties (two in Colorado) to give a plurality to Ross Perot in the 1992 election, but every other Republican candidate since 1968 has obtained an absolute majority in Moffat County.

United States presidential election results for Moffat County, Colorado
Year	Republican		Democratic		Third party(ies)	
Year	No.	%	No.	%	No.	%
1912	294	31.34%	409	43.60%	235	25.05%
1916	512	39.72%	740	57.41%	37	2.87%
1920	1,294	65.42%	589	29.78%	95	4.80%
1924	1,009	50.70%	647	32.51%	334	16.78%
1928	1,346	64.56%	710	34.05%	29	1.39%
1932	880	36.56%	1,388	57.67%	139	5.77%
1936	954	42.14%	1,090	48.14%	220	9.72%
1940	1,556	59.23%	1,056	40.20%	15	0.57%
1944	1,445	60.87%	923	38.88%	6	0.25%
1948	1,261	52.74%	1,101	46.05%	29	1.21%
1952	1,922	70.12%	808	29.48%	11	0.40%
1956	1,762	68.80%	797	31.12%	2	0.08%
1960	1,754	59.32%	1,200	40.58%	3	0.10%
1964	1,438	46.34%	1,657	53.40%	8	0.26%
1968	1,785	62.09%	765	26.61%	325	11.30%
1972	1,928	67.70%	591	20.75%	329	11.55%
1976	2,099	55.68%	1,451	38.49%	220	5.84%
1980	3,344	67.90%	1,079	21.91%	502	10.19%
1984	3,630	72.88%	1,228	24.65%	123	2.47%
1988	2,757	61.01%	1,634	36.16%	128	2.83%
1992	1,809	35.51%	1,386	27.20%	1,900	37.29%
1996	2,466	50.99%	1,635	33.81%	735	15.20%
2000	3,840	71.95%	1,223	22.92%	274	5.13%
2004	4,247	74.18%	1,355	23.67%	123	2.15%
2008	4,135	70.43%	1,582	26.95%	154	2.62%
2012	4,695	76.12%	1,330	21.56%	143	2.32%
2016	5,305	81.30%	874	13.39%	346	5.30%
2020	5,670	80.70%	1,203	17.12%	153	2.18%
2024	5,358	80.32%	1,167	17.49%	146	2.19%

United States Senate election results for Moffat County, Colorado2
Year	Republican		Democratic		Third party(ies)	
Year	No.	%	No.	%	No.	%
2020	5,544	81.41%	1,120	16.45%	146	2.14%

United States Senate election results for Moffat County, Colorado3
Year	Republican		Democratic		Third party(ies)	
Year	No.	%	No.	%	No.	%
2022	4,150	76.89%	1,069	19.81%	178	3.30%

Colorado Gubernatorial election results for Moffat County
Year	Republican		Democratic		Third party(ies)	
Year	No.	%	No.	%	No.	%
2022	4,174	77.04%	1,058	19.53%	186	3.43%

In gubernatorial elections, Moffat County has also generally been Republican, but was nonetheless carried by Democrat Roy Romer by a narrow margin in 1990 – when he carried all but four counties statewide – by Dick Lamm in 1982 and by Constitution Party candidate Tom Tancredo in 2010. In senatorial elections, the Republican candidate has consistently garnered over 60 percent of Moffat County voters since future party-switcher Ben Nighthorse Campbell won the county for the Democratic Party in 1992.

== See also ==
- Bibliography of Colorado
- Geography of Colorado
- History of Colorado
  - National Register of Historic Places listings in Moffat County, Colorado
- Index of Colorado-related articles
- List of Colorado-related lists
  - List of counties in Colorado
  - List of statistical areas in Colorado
- Outline of Colorado
