= Wattenburg, Colorado =

Unincorporated community in Weld County, CO, USA

Wattenburg, Colorado Wattenberg, Colorado
- Unincorporated community
- Location in Weld County and the state of Colorado Wattenburg, Colorado (the United States)
- Coordinates: 40°01′40″N 104°50′12″W
- Country: United States
- State: Colorado
- County: Weld County
- Elevation: 4,938 ft (1,505 m)
- Time zone: UTC-7 (MST)
  - Summer (DST): UTC-6 (MDT)
- ZIP code: 80621 (Fort Lupton)
- GNIS feature ID: 180850

Wattenburg or Wattenberg is an unincorporated community located in Weld County, Colorado, United States. The U.S. Post Office at Fort Lupton (ZIP code 80621) now serves Wattenburg postal addresses.
