= Slater, Colorado =

Unincorporated community in Colorado, USA

- Unincorporated community
- Location within Colorado Location within the United States
- Coordinates: 40°56′52″N 107°29′52″W
- Country: United States
- State: Colorado
- County: Moffat County, Routt County
- Elevation: 7,753 ft (2,363 m)
- Time zone: UTC-7 (MST)
  - Summer (DST): UTC-6 (MDT)
- ZIP code: 81653
- Area code: 970
- GNIS feature ID: 1952147

Slater is an unincorporated community and a U.S. Post Office located in both Moffat County, and Routt County, Colorado, United States. The Slater Post Office has the ZIP Code 81653.

Slater is unusual in that, while it lies within Colorado, the main highway which services the town is Wyoming Highway 70, which dips south of the state line into Colorado for approximately 0.9 miles through Slater before turning north back into Wyoming. The highway through Slater is maintained by the Wyoming Department of Transportation.
