= Spar City, Colorado =

Unincorporated community in Mineral County, CO, USA

- Unincorporated community
- Location within Colorado Location within the United States
- Coordinates: 37°42′26″N 106°58′06″W
- Country: United States
- State: Colorado
- County: Mineral
- Elevation: 9,466 ft (2,885 m)
- Time zone: UTC-7 (Mountain (MST))
  - Summer (DST): UTC-6 (MDT)
- GNIS feature ID: 204765

Spar City (also Fisher City) is an unincorporated community in Mineral County, Colorado, United States. It lies along an unpaved road southwest of the town of Creede, the county seat of Mineral County.

== History ==
Spar City was historically a mining town when the surrounding area was believed to hold much silver ore. It quickly became a ghost town before becoming a corporation. It is owned by 35 shareholders, each of whom are given access to a cabin. Owners are free to make improvements to their cabins, often through the caretaker.

== Climate ==
Hermit 8 SE is a weather station near Spar City. Hermit 8 SE has a subalpine climate (Köppen Dfc) bordering on a humid continental climate (Köppen Dfb).

Climate data for Spar City, Colorado, 1991–2020 normals, extremes 1920–present
Month	Jan	Feb	Mar	Apr	May	Jun	Jul	Aug	Sep	Oct	Nov	Dec	Year
Record high °F (°C)	59 (15)	65 (18)	75 (24)	80 (27)	84 (29)	92 (33)	93 (34)	95 (35)	85 (29)	82 (28)	70 (21)	65 (18)	95 (35)
Mean maximum °F (°C)	44.8 (7.1)	47.9 (8.8)	55.0 (12.8)	63.2 (17.3)	73.0 (22.8)	81.7 (27.6)	84.4 (29.1)	81.7 (27.6)	77.2 (25.1)	70.4 (21.3)	58.9 (14.9)	47.1 (8.4)	85.7 (29.8)
Mean daily maximum °F (°C)	34.3 (1.3)	37.6 (3.1)	44.6 (7.0)	52.7 (11.5)	62.3 (16.8)	73.9 (23.3)	79.0 (26.1)	75.7 (24.3)	69.9 (21.1)	59.3 (15.2)	46.6 (8.1)	35.0 (1.7)	55.9 (13.3)
Daily mean °F (°C)	16.4 (−8.7)	19.4 (−7.0)	28.0 (−2.2)	36.5 (2.5)	45.1 (7.3)	53.9 (12.2)	60.0 (15.6)	57.9 (14.4)	51.2 (10.7)	41.1 (5.1)	28.8 (−1.8)	17.4 (−8.1)	38.0 (3.3)
Mean daily minimum °F (°C)	−1.5 (−18.6)	1.3 (−17.1)	11.3 (−11.5)	20.4 (−6.4)	27.8 (−2.3)	33.8 (1.0)	41.1 (5.1)	40.0 (4.4)	32.5 (0.3)	23.0 (−5.0)	11.1 (−11.6)	−0.1 (−17.8)	20.1 (−6.6)
Mean minimum °F (°C)	−19.8 (−28.8)	−18.6 (−28.1)	−10.0 (−23.3)	4.6 (−15.2)	16.2 (−8.8)	24.3 (−4.3)	31.5 (−0.3)	30.5 (−0.8)	20.2 (−6.6)	8.4 (−13.1)	−8.9 (−22.7)	−19.6 (−28.7)	−23.7 (−30.9)
Record low °F (°C)	−45 (−43)	−40 (−40)	−36 (−38)	−25 (−32)	2 (−17)	13 (−11)	20 (−7)	18 (−8)	9 (−13)	−8 (−22)	−40 (−40)	−44 (−42)	−45 (−43)
Average precipitation inches (mm)	0.56 (14)	0.80 (20)	0.94 (24)	0.71 (18)	0.77 (20)	0.65 (17)	1.89 (48)	2.39 (61)	1.68 (43)	1.00 (25)	0.97 (25)	0.52 (13)	12.88 (328)
Average snowfall inches (cm)	9.0 (23)	10.1 (26)	9.6 (24)	5.7 (14)	1.3 (3.3)	0.0 (0.0)	0.0 (0.0)	0.0 (0.0)	0.2 (0.51)	3.8 (9.7)	8.1 (21)	7.2 (18)	55.0 (140)
Average precipitation days (≥ 0.01 in)	4.1	4.7	4.5	4.5	4.4	4.9	12.2	14.3	8.5	5.1	4.4	4.1	75.7
Average snowy days (≥ 0.1 in)	3.9	4.4	3.8	2.6	0.8	0.0	0.0	0.0	0.1	1.2	3.2	3.9	23.9
Source 1: NOAA
Source 2: XMACIS2
