= Camp Bird, Colorado =

Unincorporated community in Ouray County, CO, USA

- unincorporated community
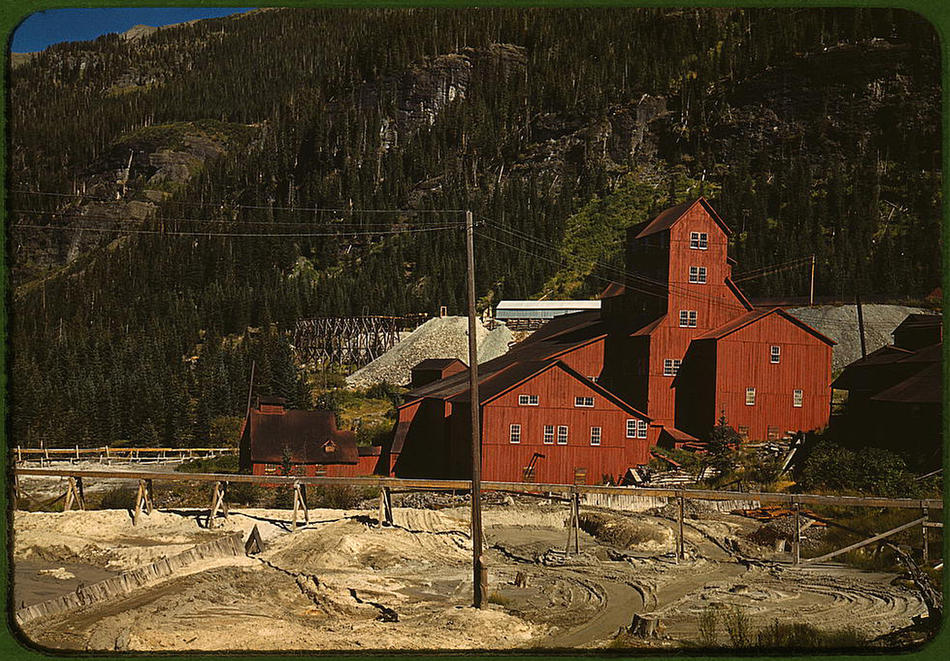
- Mill at the Camp Bird Mine, October 1940

- Location of Camp Bird, Colorado Camp Bird (Colorado)
- Coordinates: 37°58′22″N 107°43′35″W
- Country: United States
- State: Colorado
- County: Ouray

Government
  - Type: Unincorporated community
  - Body: Ouray County
- Elevation: 9,728 ft (2,965 m)
- Time zone: UTC−07:00 (MST)
  - Summer (DST): UTC−06:00 (MDT)
- ZIP code: 81427 (Ouray, Colorado)
- GNIS pop ID: 187260

Camp Bird is a tiny unincorporated community in Ouray County, Colorado, United States. It lies between the present towns of Ouray and Telluride. Camp Bird is west of Thistledown and reached by CO Road 361 (Camp Bird Road).

== History ==
The town was famous for Camp Bird Mine. The Campbird, Colorado, post office operated from April 28, 1898, until March 15, 1919.

Today it is an unincorporated community with a very small populace.

== See also ==
- List of populated places in Colorado
