= Loyd, Colorado =

Unincorporated community in Moffat County, CO, USA

- Unincorporated community
- Location within Colorado Location within the United States
- Coordinates: 40°18′13″N 107°42′17″W
- Country: United States
- State: Colorado
- County: Moffat
- Elevation: 6,401 ft (1,951 m)
- Time zone: UTC-7 (Mountain (MST))
  - Summer (DST): UTC-6 (MDT)
- Area code: 970
- GNIS feature ID: 171414

Loyd is an unincorporated community in Moffat County, Colorado, United States.
