= Sunbeam, Colorado =

Unincorporated community in Moffat County, CO, USA

Coordinates: 40°33′03″N 108°11′45″W

Sunbeam is an unincorporated community in Moffat County, in the U.S. state of Colorado.

== History ==
A post office called Sunbeam was established in 1912, and remained in operation until 1942. The community was named for the ample sunshine at the town site.
