= Thistledown, Colorado =

Unincorporated community in Ouray County, CO, USA

Coordinates: 37°59′37″N 107°41′59″W

Thistledown is an unincorporated community in Ouray County, Colorado, United States. The community is located southwest of Ouray on Camp Bird Road (Co Road 361) between Ouray and Camp Bird.

== See also ==
- Communities of Ouray County
