= Dinosaur, Colorado =

Town in Colorado, US

- Statutory town
- Town of Dinosaur
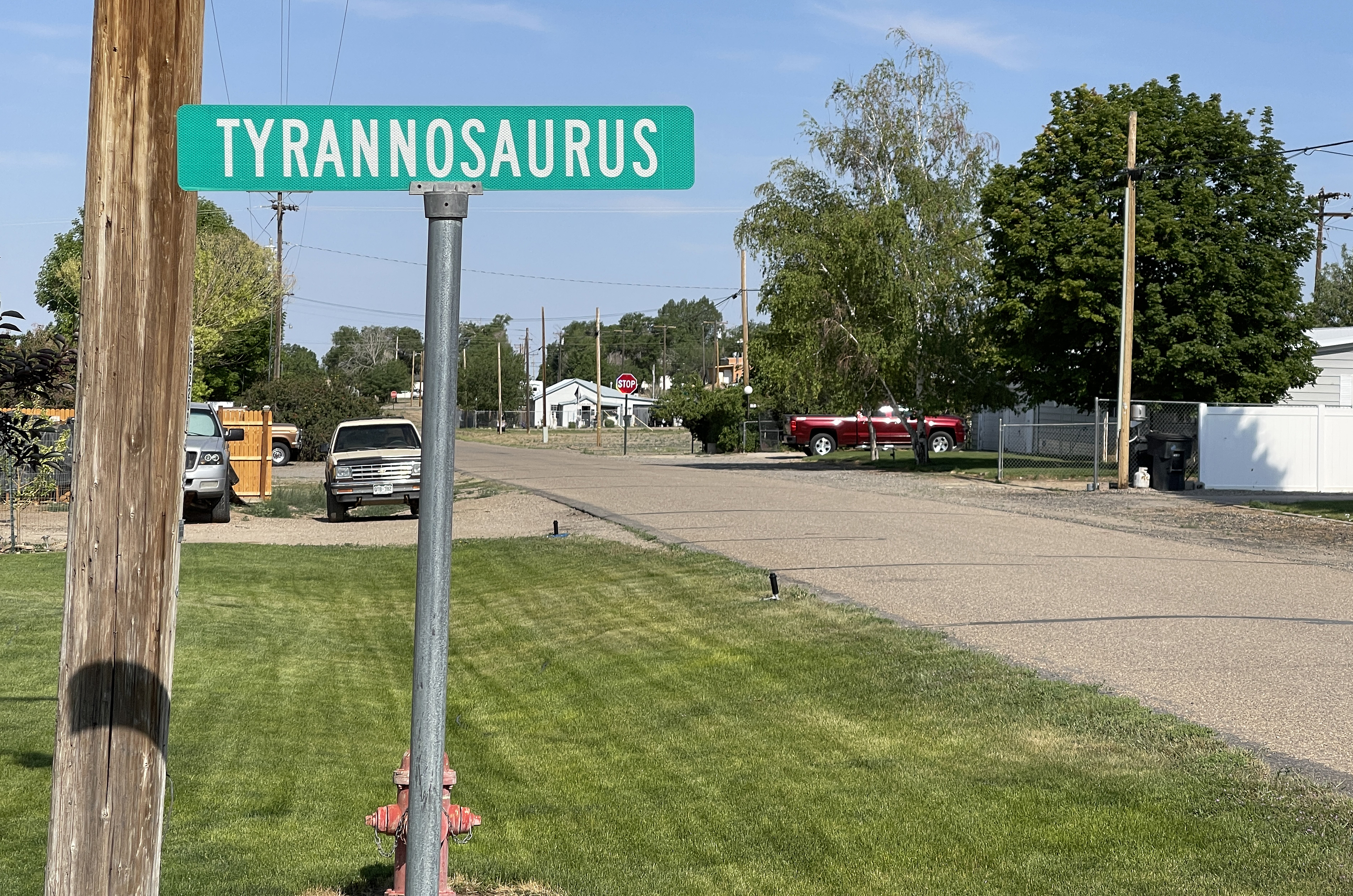
- A sign for Tyrannosaurus Trail, a street in Dinosaur

- Logo

- Location in Moffat County, Colorado

- Location of the Town of Dinosaur, Colorado. Dinosaur (Colorado)
- Coordinates: 40.2436°N 109.0146°W
- Country: United States
- State: Colorado
- County: Moffat
- Incorporated: December 18, 1947
- Named after: Dinosaur National Monument

Government
  - Type: Statutory town

Area
  - Total: 0.930 sq mi (2.408 km^{2})
  - Land: 0.930 sq mi (2.408 km^{2})
  - Water: 0 sq mi (0.000 km^{2})
- Elevation: 5,922 ft (1,805 m)

Population (2020)
  - Total: 243
  - Density: 261/sq mi (101/km^{2})
  - Metro: 13,292
  - CSA: 38,121
- Time zone: UTC−07:00 (MST)
  - Summer (DST): UTC−06:00 (MDT)
- ZIP codes: 81610 & 81633
- Area codes: 970/748
- GNIS place ID: 171542
- GNIS town ID: 2412432
- FIPS code: 08-20495
- Website: townofdinosaur.colorado.gov

Dinosaur is a statutory town in Moffat County, Colorado, United States. As of the 2020 census, the population was 243, down from 339 at the 2010 census. Dinosaur is a part of the Steamboat Springs, CO Micropolitan Statistical Area.

== History ==
The town of Dinosaur was originally known as "Baxter Springs", owned by Art and Fanny Baxter. It was renamed "Artesia" for its valued water supply when a town was platted to accommodate the oil boom in the 1940s. The Artesia, Colorado, post office opened on March 20, 1946, and the Town of Artesia was incorporated on December 18, 1947. On January 1, 1966, the town's name was changed to Dinosaur due to its proximity to Dinosaur National Monument. The headquarters of Dinosaur National Monument is located just east of the town on U.S. Highway 40.

== Geography ==
Dinosaur is located in the southwestern Moffat County at coordinates 40.2436°N 109.0146°W and elevation 5,922 feet (1,805 m). The Utah border is 2 miles (3 km) to the west. US-40 runs along the northern border of the town, leading east 87 miles (140 km) to Craig, the county seat, and west 33 miles (53 km) to Vernal, Utah. Colorado State Highway 64 has its northern terminus in Dinosaur and leads southeast 18 miles (29 km) to Rangely. The entrance and headquarters of Dinosaur National Monument are 2 miles (3 km) east on US-40, with the main body of the park 19 miles (31 km) to the north via Harpers Corner Road.

At the 2020 United States census, the town of Dinosaur had a total area of 595 acres (2.408 km^{2}), all of it land.

Many streets in the town are named after dinosaurs, including Cletisaurus Circle, Tyrannosaurus Trail, and Antrodemus Alley.

== Demographics ==
Historical population
Census	Pop.	Note	%±
1950	281		—
1960	318		13.2%
1970	247		−22.3%
1980	313		26.7%
1990	324		3.5%
2000	314		−3.1%
2010	339		8.0%
2020	243		−28.3%
U.S. Decennial Census

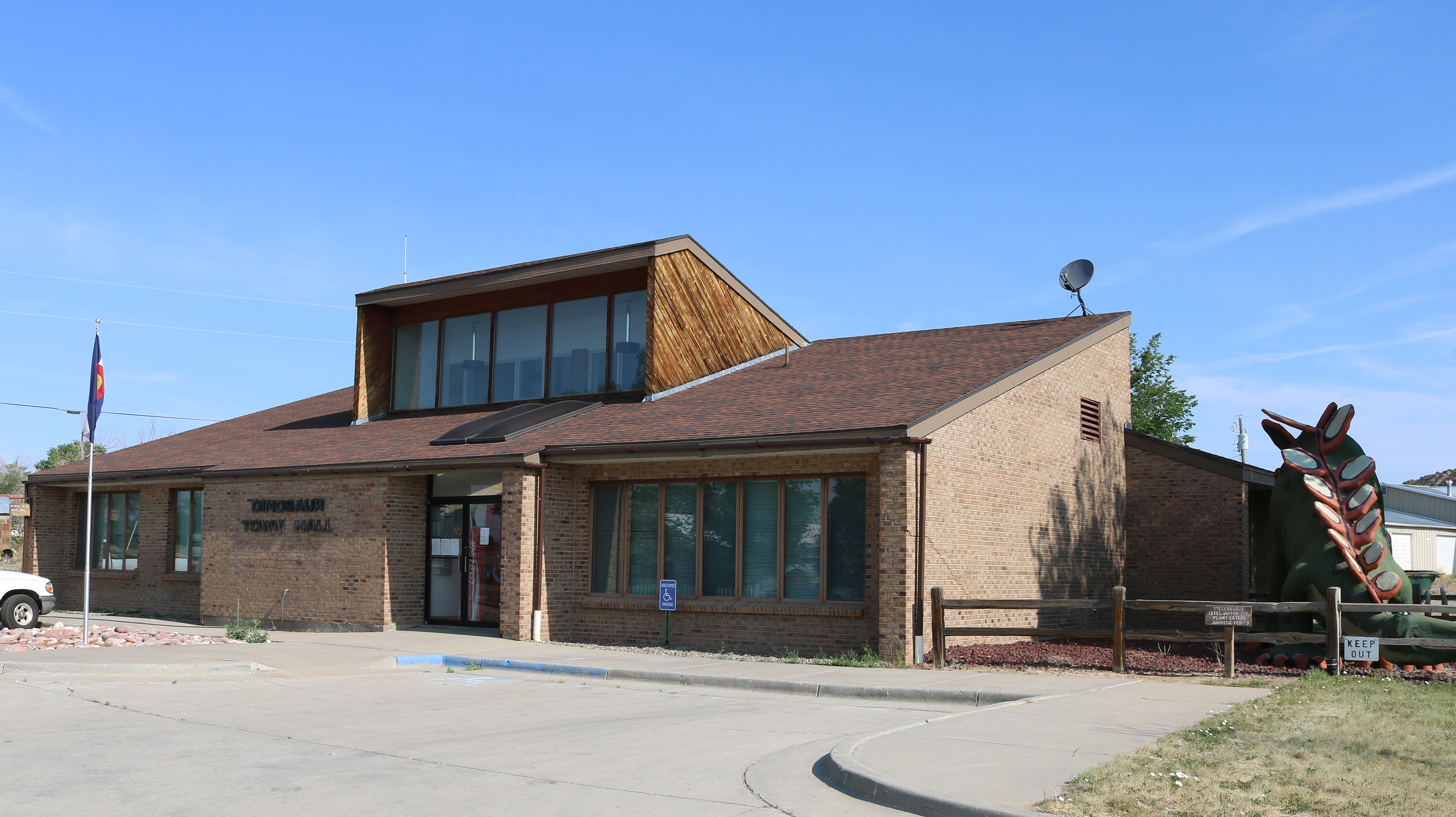
Dinosaur Town Hall

As of the census of 2000, there were 320 people, 124 households, and 88 families residing in the town. The population density was 400.9 inhabitants per square mile (154.8/km^{2}). There were 156 housing units at an average density of 196.1 units per square mile (75.7 units/km^{2}). The racial makeup of the town was 98.43% White, 0.31% from other races, and 1.25% from two or more races. Hispanic or Latino of any race were 3.76% of the population.

There were 124 households, out of which 34.7% had children under the age of 18 living with them, 57.3% were married couples living together, 9.7% had a female householder with no husband present, and 29.0% were non-families. 25.0% of all households were made up of individuals, and 12.9% had someone living alone who was 65 years of age or older. The average household size was 2.57 and the average family size was 3.10.

In the town, the population was spread out, with 28.5% under the age of 18, 9.4% from 18 to 24, 26.6% from 25 to 44, 23.5% from 45 to 64, and 11.9% who were 65 years of age or older. The median age was 36 years. For every 100 females, there were 96.9 males. For every 100 females age 18 and over, there were 94.9 males.

The median income for a household in the town was $31,250, and the median income for a family was $31,250. Males had a median income of $43,500 versus $16,250 for females. The per capita income for the town was $12,904. About 18.8% of families and 17.9% of the population were below the poverty line, including 15.6% of those under age 18 and 14.3% of those age 65 or over.

== Economy ==
In addition to tourism related to the Dinosaur National Monument, cannabis dispensaries have been a significant part of Dinosaur's economy since the late 2010s. Because recreational cannabis is legal in Colorado but illegal in bordering Utah, Dinosaur's cannabis dispensaries serve Utah residents driving across the state line to purchase the drug legally.

== In popular culture ==
- In a 2022 television commercial for GoDaddy, an online retailer's staff celebrate after receiving an order from Dinosaur.

== See also ==
- Steamboat Springs, CO Micropolitan Statistical Area
- List of municipalities in Colorado
- List of populated places in Colorado
- List of post offices in Colorado
