= List of populated places in Colorado by county: F–L =

The location of the State of Colorado in the United States of America.

The 64 counties of the U.S. State of Colorado.

See also the Alphabetical list of populated places in Colorado.

This is a list of more than 3,800 currently, or formerly, inhabited places in the U.S. State of Colorado sorted by county. (Note: This list includes 1913 Colorado places selectively downloaded from the Geographic Names Information System on October 15, 2023.)
Currently inhabited places in Colorado include the:

- 273 municipalities from the List of municipalities in Colorado
- 210 census-designated places from the List of census-designated places in Colorado
- 64 counties from the List of counties in Colorado.
- 8 military bases from the List of military installations in Colorado
- 2 Native American reservations from the List of Native American reservations in Colorado

This list also includes the current and extinct populated places found in the:

- Geographic Names Information System
- United States Geological Survey historic trail maps
- List of county seats in Colorado
- List of forts in Colorado
- List of ghost towns in Colorado
- List of National Register of Historic Places in Colorado
- List of post offices in Colorado
- List of trading posts in Colorado

- For important dates associated with many of these places, please see the List of municipalities in Colorado and the List of post offices in Colorado.
- For the ZIP Codes for many of these places, please see the List of post offices in Colorado.
- For the telephone area codes for many of these places, please see the List of Colorado telephone area codes.
- For all federally recognized place names in Colorado, please see the Geographic Names Information System.

†	County seat
‡	Former county seat
#	State capital
⁂	Former territorial capital

Select a Colorado county:

- Adams
- Alamosa
- Arapahoe
- Archuleta
- Baca
- Bent
- Boulder
- Broomfield
- Chaffee
- Cheyenne
- Clear Creek
- Conejos
- Costilla
- Crowley
- Custer
- Delta
- Denver
- Dolores
- Douglas
- Eagle
- El Paso
- Elbert
- Fremont
- Garfield
- Gilpin
- Grand
- Gunnison
- Hinsdale
- Huerfano
- Jackson
- Jefferson
- Kiowa
- Kit Carson
- La Plata
- Lake
- Larimer
- Las Animas
- Lincoln
- Logan
- Mesa
- Mineral
- Moffat
- Montezuma
- Montrose
- Morgan
- Otero
- Ouray
- Park
- Phillips
- Pitkin
- Prowers
- Pueblo
- Rio Blanco
- Rio Grande
- Routt
- Saguache
- San Juan
- San Miguel
- Sedgwick
- Summit
- Teller
- Washington
- Weld
- Yuma

== Fremont County ==
Select the OpenStreetMap link at the right to view the location of places in this section.

Place	Type	ZIP Code	Location	Elevation
Adelaide	ghost town	81212	38.5600°N 105.0908°W	6,949 feet (2,118 m)
Anita	former post office			
Barehills	former post office			
Beaver	former post office			
Beaver Creek (1862)	former post office			
Beaver Creek (1883)	former post office			
Brewster	former post office			
Brookside	statutory town	81212	38.4153°N 105.1919°W	5,348 feet (1,630 m)
Buckskin Joe	former post office	81212	38.4764°N 105.3269°W	6,299 feet (1,920 m)
Calcite	ghost town			
Canon City (Note: On November 1, 1861, the new Territory of Colorado created 17 original counties, with Cañon City as the seat of Fremont County, Colorado Territory, and since statehood on August 1, 1876, the seat of Fremont County, Colorado. Cañon City has also been spelled Canon City and Canyon City.)	see Cañon City			
Cañon City†	home rule city	81212, 80215	38.4410°N 105.2424°W	5,351 feet (1,631 m)
Canyon City	see Cañon City			
Chandler	ghost town	81212	38.3731°N 105.2005°W	5,738 feet (1,749 m)
Clonmell	former post office			
Coal Creek	statutory town	81221	38.3611°N 105.1483°W	5,427 feet (1,654 m)
Coalcreek	see Coal Creek			
Coaldale	census-designated place	81222	38.3557°N 105.8131°W	8,750 feet (2,667 m)
Concrete	unincorporated community	81240	38.3833°N 104.9978°W	5,036 feet (1,535 m)
Copperfield	former post office			
Cotopaxi	census-designated place	81223	38.3769°N 105.6888°W	6,450 feet (1,966 m)
Cramer	former post office			
Currant	former post office			
Currant Creek	former post office			
Cyanide	former post office			
Driscoll	former post office			
East Cañon	Cañon City neighborhood	81212	38.4528°N 105.2130°W	5,344 feet (1,629 m)
Echo	unincorporated community	81223	38.4428°N 105.5389°W	6,086 feet (1,855 m)
Eldred	former post office			
Fairy	former post office			
Fidler	former post office			
Fink	unincorporated community	81212	38.4889°N 105.3811°W	5,764 feet (1,757 m)
Florence	statutory city	81226, 81290	38.3903°N 105.1186°W	5,180 feet (1,579 m)
Ford	see Texas Creek			
Fords Mountaindale Ranch	unincorporated community	81240	38.6022°N 104.9480°W	6,857 feet (2,090 m)
Galena	unincorporated community	81252	38.2619°N 105.2778°W	7,946 feet (2,422 m)
Glendale	see Penrose			
Grape	former post office			
Hatton	former post office			
Hayden Creek	see Coaldale			
Heathton	former post office			
Hendricks	see Coaldale			
Hillsdale	former post office			
Hillside	unincorporated community	81232	38.2653°N 105.6117°W	7,490 feet (2,283 m)
Howard	census-designated place	81233	38.4098°N 105.8424°W	7,405 feet (2,257 m)
Juniper	former post office			
Kalbaugh	former post office			
Kenwood	former post office			
Lincoln Park	census-designated place	81212	38.4292°N 105.2200°W	5,390 feet (1,643 m)
Littell	former post office			
Manoa	former post office			
Micanite	former post office			
Orchard Park	unincorporated community	81212	38.4722°N 105.2283°W	5,443 feet (1,659 m)
Palmer	see Coaldale			
Park Center	census-designated place	81212	38.4778°N 105.2061°W	5,561 feet (1,695 m)
Parkdale	unincorporated community			
Penrose	census-designated place	81240	38.4250°N 105.0228°W	5,335 feet (1,626 m)
Pleasant Valley	see Howard			
Pleasanton	unincorporated community	81222	38.3650°N 105.7478°W	6,486 feet (1,977 m)
Portland	census-designated place	81226	38.3911°N 105.0250°W	5,043 feet (1,537 m)
Prospect Heights	Cañon City neighborhood	81212	38.4264°N 105.2375°W	5,433 feet (1,656 m)
Pyrolite	former post office			
Radiant	former post office			
Robinson	see Adelaide			
Rockvale	statutory town	81244	38.3697°N 105.1639°W	5,463 feet (1,665 m)
Royal Gorge	former post office			
Sample	unincorporated community	81212	38.4722°N 105.3555°W	5,735 feet (1,748 m)
Sikes	unincorporated community	81253	38.2583°N 105.0747°W	5,935 feet (1,809 m)
Skinner	former post office			
Sunol	former post office			
Sunset City	unincorporated community	81223	38.4125°N 105.4172°W	6,755 feet (2,059 m)
Taclamur	former post office			
Texas	see Hillside			
Texas Creek (1872)	see Hillside			
Texas Creek (1885)	unincorporated community	81223	38.4131°N 105.5806°W	6,194 feet (1,888 m)
Titusville	former post office			
Toof	former post office			
Vallie	unincorporated community	81223	38.3942°N 105.7725°W	6,522 feet (1,988 m)
Wellsville	unincorporated community	81201	38.4867°N 105.9100°W	6,893 feet (2,101 m)
Whitehorn	unincorporated community	81201	38.6439°N 105.8783°W	9,337 feet (2,846 m)
Wilbur	former post office			
Williamsburg	statutory town	81226	38.3819°N 105.1519°W	5,390 feet (1,643 m)
Yorkville	unincorporated community	81212	38.2922°N 105.2903°W	7,815 feet (2,382 m)

== Garfield County ==
Select the OpenStreetMap link at the right to view the location of places in this section.

Place	Type	ZIP Code	Location	Elevation
Antlers	unincorporated community	81650	39.5433°N 107.7278°W	5,387 feet (1,642 m)
Anvil Points	ghost town	81650	39.5161°N 107.9228°W	5,653 feet (1,723 m)
Atchee	unincorporated community	81630	39.5630°N 108.9129°W	6,417 feet (1,956 m)
Austin	former post office			
Balzac	former post office			
Barlow‡ (Note: On June 25, 1883, Defiance changed its name to Barlow, and several months later, county voters selected Barlow as the new seat of Garfield County, Colorado. On March 28, 1884, Barlow changed its name to Glenwood Springs, and Glenwood Springs continues to serve as county seat.)	see Glenwood Springs			
Battlement Mesa	census-designated place	81636	39.4414°N 108.0251°W	5,489 feet (1,673 m)
Carbonate‡ (Note: Carbonate served as the original seat of Garfield County, Colorado for several months after the county was created on February 10, 1883.)	statutory town	81602	39.7430°N 107.3467°W	10,925 feet (3,330 m)
Carbondale	home rule town	81623	39.4022°N 107.2112°W	6,171 feet (1,881 m)
Carbonera	unincorporated community	81630	39.4589°N 108.9590°W	5,515 feet (1,681 m)
Cardiff	unincorporated community	81601	39.5061°N 107.3109°W	5,935 feet (1,809 m)
Catherin	see Catherine			
Catherine	census-designated place	81623	39.4013°N 107.1241°W	6,348 feet (1,935 m)
Cattle Creek	census-designated place	81601	39.4666°N 107.2599°W	6,247 feet (1,904 m)
Chacra	census-designated place	81601	39.5770°N 107.4509°W	5,722 feet (1,744 m)
Chapman	see New Castle			
Coalridge	former post office			
Dailey	former post office			
Defiance	see Glenwood Springs			
Early Spring	former post office			
Ferguson	former post office			
Funston	unincorporated community	81601	39.5605°N 107.3492°W	5,725 feet (1,745 m)
Glenwood Springs†	home rule city	81601-81602	39.5505°N 107.3248°W	5,761 feet (1,756 m)
Grand Valley	see Parachute			
Gresham	former post office			
Hecla	former post office			
Highmore	former post office			
Kiggin	unincorporated community	61623	39.4264°N 107.2395°W	6,125 feet (1,867 m)
Marion	former post office			
Morris	former post office			
Mulford	census-designated place	81623	39.4087°N 107.1685°W	6,234 feet (1,900 m)
New Castle	home rule town	81647	39.5728°N 107.5364°W	5,597 feet (1,706 m)
Newcastle	see New Castle			
No Name	census-designated place	81601	39.5611°N 107.2931°W	5,906 feet (1,800 m)
Parachute	home rule town	81635	39.4519°N 108.0529°W	5,092 feet (1,552 m)
Raven	former post office			
Rifle	home rule city	81650	39.5347°N 107.7831°W	5,348 feet (1,630 m)
Riland	former post office			
Rulison	unincorporated community	81650	39.4972°N 107.9406°W	5,190 feet (1,582 m)
Satank	unincorporated community	81623	39.4139°N 107.2284°W	6,119 feet (1,865 m)
Shoshone	former post office			
Silt	home rule town	81652	39.5486°N 107.6562°W	5,456 feet (1,663 m)
South Cañon	former post office			
Sunlight	former post office			
Una	unincorporated community	81635	39.3997°N 108.1087°W	5,016 feet (1,529 m)
Vulcan	former post office			
Waterman	former post office			

== Gilpin County ==
Select the OpenStreetMap link at the right to view the location of places in this section.

Place	Type	ZIP Code	Location	Elevation
American City	unincorporated community	80427	39.8725°N 105.5872°W	10,633 feet (3,241 m)
Apex	ghost town	80422	39.8656°N 105.5702°W	9,846 feet (3,001 m)
Bald Mountain	see Nevadaville			
Baltimore	unincorporated community	80422	39.9033°N 105.5744°W	8,904 feet (2,714 m)
Black Hawk	home rule city	80422	39.8038°N 105.4952°W	8,533 feet (2,601 m)
Black Hawk Point	see Black Hawk			
Blackhawk	see Black Hawk			
Central City† (Note: On November 28, 1859, the Provisional Government of the Territory of Jefferson created 12 counties, with Central City as the seat of Mountain County, Jefferson Territory. On November 1, 1861, the new Territory of Colorado created 17 original counties, with Central City as the seat of Gilpin County, Colorado Territory, and since statehood on August 1, 1876, the seat of Gilpin County, Colorado. The City of Central now also extends into Clear Creek County.)	home rule city	80427	39.8019°N 105.5142°W	8,497 feet (2,590 m)
Coal Creek CDP (Note: The Coal Creek CDP straddles Jefferson, Boulder, and Gilpin counties.)	census-designated place	80403	See also the Coal Creek CDP in Jefferson County.	
Colorado Sierra	former post office			
Cottonwood	unincorporated community	80403	39.7633°N 105.4247°W	7,221 feet (2,201 m)
East Portal	unincorporated community	80466	39.9033°N 105.6444°W	9,242 feet (2,817 m)
Gilpin	unincorporated community	80422	39.8908°N 105.5081°W	9,039 feet (2,755 m)
Gold Dirt	former post office			
Lincoln Hills	unincorporated community	80422	39.9225°N 105.4583°W	8,186 feet (2,495 m)
Missouri City	ghost town			
Mountain City	see Central City			
Nevada	see Nevadaville			
Nevadaville	ghost town	80427	39.7953°N 105.5325°W	9,121 feet (2,780 m)
Nugget	unincorporated community	80422	39.8636°N 105.5883°W	10,262 feet (3,128 m)
Pactolus	unincorporated community	80422	39.9178°N 105.4644°W	8,212 feet (2,503 m)
Perigo	unincorporated community	80474	39.8792°N 105.5308°W	9,639 feet (2,938 m)
Phoenix	unincorporated community	80466	39.9286°N 105.5356°W	9,170 feet (2,795 m)
Pinecliffe (Note: Pinecliffe, Colorado straddles Gilpin and Boulder counties.)	unincorporated community	80471	39.9319°N 105.4283°W	8,012 feet (2,442 m)
Rollinsville	census-designated place	80474	39.9232°N 105.5136°W	8,668 feet (2,642 m)
Russell Gulch	ghost town	80427	39.7786°N 105.5369°W	9,147 feet (2,788 m)
Smith Hill	unincorporated community	80422	39.7783°N 105.4586°W	7,648 feet (2,331 m)
South Boulder	former post office			
Tiptop	former post office			
Tolland	unincorporated community	80474	39.9050°N 105.5892°W	8,921 feet (2,719 m)
Wideawake	unincorporated community		39.8500°N 105.5217°W	9,364 feet (2,854 m)
Yankee Hill	former post office			

== Grand County ==
Select the OpenStreetMap link at the right to view the location of places in this section.

Place	Type	ZIP Code	Location	Elevation
Arrow	ghost town	80524		
Clarkson	former post office			
Colorow	former post office			
Corona	ghost town	80482	39.9344°N 105.6853°W	11,722 feet (3,573 m)
Coulter	former post office			
Crescent	former post office			
Dexter	former post office			
Elkdale	unincorporated community	80446	40.0403°N 105.8811°W	8,153 feet (2,485 m)
Fairfax	former post office			
Fraser	statutory town	80442	39.9450°N 105.8172°W	8,579 feet (2,615 m)
Gaskil	unincorporated community	80447	40.3305°N 105.8622°W	8,786 feet (2,678 m)
Granby	statutory town	80446	40.0861°N 105.9395°W	7,976 feet (2,431 m)
Grand Lake‡ (Note: Grand Lake served as the seat of Grand County, Colorado from 1882 until 1888. On June 30, 1895, Grand Lake changed its name to Grandlake; then changed it back to Grand Lake on April 1, 1938.)	statutory town	80447	40.2522°N 105.8231°W	8,386 feet (2,556 m)
Grandlake	see Grand Lake			
Hermitage	former post office			
Hideaway Park	Winter Park neighborhood	80482	39.9180°N 105.7856°W	8,802 feet (2,683 m)
Hot Sulphur Springs† (Note: Hot Sulphur Springs served as the original seat of Grand County, Colorado Territory since the county was created on February 2, 1874, and with statehood on August 1, 1876, the seat of Grand County, Colorado until 1882 and then again from 1888 to present. On June 26, 1894, Hot Sulphur Springs changed its name to Sulphur Springs, then changed it back to Hot Sulphur Springs on February 15, 1912.)	statutory town	80451	40.0730°N 106.1028°W	7,730 feet (2,356 m)
Kinsey	see Kremmling			
Kremmling	statutory town	80459	40.0589°N 106.3889°W	7,313 feet (2,229 m)
Leal	unincorporated community	80468	39.8103°N 106.0445°W	8,871 feet (2,704 m)
Lehman	former post office			
Lulu	see Lulu City			
Lulu City	ghost town			
Martin	former post office			
Maryvale	unincorporated community	80442	39.9330°N 105.7872°W	8,698 feet (2,651 m)
Parshall	census-designated place	80468	40.0556°N 106.1760°W	7,585 feet (2,312 m)
Pearmont	former post office			
Pella	former post office			
Radium	unincorporated community			
Red Mountain	former post office			
Scholl	former post office			
Selak	former post office			
Stillwater	former post office	80447		
Sulphur Springs‡	see Hot Sulphur Springs			
Tabernash	census-designated place	80478	39.9936°N 105.8431°W	8,330 feet (2,539 m)
Teller	former post office			
Tiptop	former post office			
Troublesome	unincorporated community	80459	40.0608°N 106.2917°W	7,362 feet (2,244 m)
Twelve Mile	former post office			
West Portal	see Hideaway Park			
Winter Park	home rule town	80482	39.8917°N 105.7631°W	9,052 feet (2,759 m)

== Gunnison County ==
Select the OpenStreetMap link at the right to view the location of places in this section.

Place	Type	ZIP Code	Location	Elevation
Abbeyville	ghost town	81210	38.7775°N 106.4922°W	9,931 feet (3,027 m)
Aberdeen	ghost town	81230	38.4506°N 106.9908°W	7,880 feet (2,402 m)
Allen	former post office			
Almont	unincorporated community	81210	38.6647°N 106.8462°W	8,022 feet (2,445 m)
Anthracite	former post office			
Argenta (Note: The name of Argenta was changed to Tomichi on August 23, 1880.)	see Tomichi			
Baldwin	ghost town	81230	38.7639°N 107.0478°W	8,766 feet (2,672 m)
Bardine	former post office			
Barnum	former post office			
Bittner	former post office			
Bowerman	former post office			
Bowman	former post office			
Camp Genter	former post office			
Campbelltown	unincorporated community	81241	38.6122°N 106.5653°W	10,502 feet (3,201 m)
Castleton	former post office			
Chance	unincorporated community	81230	38.4372°N 106.8498°W	9,203 feet (2,805 m)
Chaney	former post office			
Clarence	former post office			
Cloud	former post office			
Cochetopa	former post office			
Cosden	former post office			
Cox	former post office			
Crested Butte	home rule town	81224-81225	38.8697°N 106.9878°W	8,924 feet (2,720 m)
Crystal	ghost town	81623	39.0592°N 107.1012°W	8,950 feet (2,728 m)
Crystal City	see Crystal			
Curran	former post office			
Dayton	former post office			
Doyleville	unincorporated community	81230	38.4517°N 106.6095°W	8,054 feet (2,455 m)
Drake	former post office			
Drew	former post office			
Dubois	former post office			
Elgin	former post office	81230		
Elko	former post office			
Elkton	ghost town	81224	38.9636°N 107.0334°W	10,453 feet (3,186 m)
Emma	former post office			
Floresta	ghost town	81230	38.8419°N 107.1228°W	9,879 feet (3,011 m)
Gateview	unincorporated community	81230	38.2936°N 107.2187°W	7,949 feet (2,423 m)
Gilman	see Doyleville			
Glacier	former post office			
Gothic	ghost town	81224	38.9592°N 106.9898°W	9,485 feet (2,891 m)
Gunnison† (Note: Gunnison has been the seat of Gunnison County, Colorado since the county was created on March 9, 1877.)	home rule city	81230-81231	38.5458°N 106.9253°W	7,703 feet (2,348 m)
Harry Parker Place	unincorporated community	81434	39.0522°N 107.4692°W	7,487 feet (2,282 m)
Haverly	former post office			
Hillerton	former post office			
Howeville	former post office			
Iola	ghost town	81434	38.4750°N 107.0973°W	7,523 feet (2,293 m)
Irwin	unincorporated community	81230	38.8736°N 107.0970°W	10,197 feet (3,108 m)
Jacks Cabin	former post office			
Jackson	former post office			
Kannah	former post office			
Kezar	former post office			
Marble	statutory town	81623	39.0722°N 107.1889°W	7,992 feet (2,436 m)
Midway	unincorporated community	81243	38.3439°N 107.0539°W	8,556 feet (2,608 m)
Minaret	former post office			
Mount Carbon	former post office			
Mount Crested Butte	home rule town	81225	38.9086°N 106.9695°W	9,498 feet (2,895 m)
North Star	former post office			
Northstar	former post office			
Nugget City	former post office			
Ohio	see Ohio City			
Ohio City	ghost town	81237	38.5667°N 106.6117°W	8,570 feet (2,612 m)
Orson	former post office			
Oversteg	former post office			
Parlin	unincorporated community	81239	38.5028°N 106.7284°W	7,933 feet (2,418 m)
Patterson Place	unincorporated community	81434	39.1139°N 106.4176°W	7,202 feet (2,195 m)
Pieplant	former post office			
Pieplant Mill	ghost town	81210	38.9380°N 106.5595°W	10,308 feet (3,142 m)
Pitkin	statutory town	81241	38.6092°N 106.5167°W	9,216 feet (2,809 m)
Pittsburg	ghost town	81224	38.9522°N 107.0625°W	9,278 feet (2,828 m)
Powderhorn	unincorporated community	81243	38.2769°N 107.0959°W	8,097 feet (2,468 m)
Prospect	former post office			
Providence	former post office			
Quartz	former post office			
Quartzville	see Pitkin			
Ragged Mountain	former post office			
Red Mountain	former post office			
Ruby	unincorporated community	81434	38.8661°N 107.0956°W	10,030 feet (3,057 m)
Sage	former post office			
Sapinero	unincorporated community	81230	38.4594°N 107.3023°W	7,621 feet (2,323 m)
Scofield	former post office			
Sillsville	unincorporated community	81230	38.4467°N 106.7611°W	8,035 feet (2,449 m)
Smith Place	unincorporated community	81243	38.2017°N 107.0598°W	8,438 feet (2,572 m)
Snowmass	former post office			
Somerset	census-designated place	81434	38.9264°N 107.4703°W	6,030 feet (1,838 m)
Spencer	former post office			
Spring	former post office			
Standish	former post office			
Stevens	former post office			
Suttle	former post office			
Tin Cup	see Tincup			
Tincup	ghost town	81210	38.7544°N 106.4784°W	10,157 feet (3,096 m)
Toliafero	former post office			
Tomichi	former post office			
Tucker	former post office			
Tumichi	see Parlin			
Turner	former post office			
Virginia	see Tincup			
Virginia City	see Tincup			
Vulcan	ghost town	81243	38.3455°N 107.0014°W	8,924 feet (2,720 m)
Waunita	former post office	81230		
Waunita Hot Springs	unincorporated community	81230	38.5142°N 106.5084°W	8,957 feet (2,730 m)
White Pine	former post office	81230		
Whitepine	unincorporated community	81230	38.5417°N 106.3936°W	9,711 feet (2,960 m)
Woodstock	former post office			

== Hinsdale County ==
Select the OpenStreetMap link at the right to view the location of places in this section.

Place	Type	ZIP Code	Location	Elevation
Belford	former post office			
Burrows Park	former post office			
Capitol City	ghost town	81235	38.0072°N 107.4667°W	9,711 feet (2,960 m)
Carson (Note: Located at an elevation of 11,574 feet (3,528 m), the Carson, Colorado post office was the highest in the United States from September 16, 1889 to June 14, 1895.)	ghost town			
Cathedral	census-designated place	81243	38.0836°N 107.0307°W	9,242 feet (2,817 m)
Debs	ghost town			
Galena City	see Capitol City			
Henson	ghost town	81235	38.0208°N 107.3770°W	9,236 feet (2,815 m)
Hermit	former post office			
Lake City† (Note: In 1875, county voters selected Lake City as the new seat of Hinsdale County, Colorado Territory, and since statehood on August 1, 1876, the seat of Hinsdale County, Colorado.)	statutory town	81235	38.0300°N 107.3153°W	8,661 feet (2,640 m)
Lakeshore	former post office			
Lost Trail	former post office			
Piedra	census-designated place	81127		
Roses Cabin	former post office			
San Juan‡ (Note: San Juan City served as the original seat of Hinsdale County, Colorado Territory since the county was created on February 10, 1874, until 1875. On June 4, 1874, San Juan City officially shortened its name to San Juan, although it was still commonly known as San Juan City.)	see San Juan City			
San Juan City‡	ghost town	81130		
Sherman	former post office			
Sunnyside	former post office			
Tellurium	former post office			
White Cross	former post office			
Whitecross	ghost town			

== Huerfano County ==
Select the OpenStreetMap link at the right to view the location of places in this section.

Place	Type	ZIP Code	Location	Elevation
Alamo	unincorporated community	81089	37.6556°N 104.9586°W	6,831 feet (2,082 m)
Apache	former post office			
Apache City	ghost town	81069	37.8583°N 104.8311°W	5,945 feet (1,812 m)
Badito‡ (Note: On September 12, 1865, Little Orphan changed its name to Badito. Badito served as the seat of Huerfano County, Colorado Territory from 1868 until 1874.)	ghost town	81089	37.7272°N 105.0142°W	6,430 feet (1,960 m)
Birmingham	former post office			
Bradford	unincorporated community	81040	37.8814°N 105.3331°W	8,048 feet (2,453 m)
Butte Valley (1869)	former post office			
Butte Valley (1938)	former post office			
Cacharas	former post office			
Calumet	unincorporated community	81089		
Camp Shumway	former post office			
Capps	former post office			
Carson	former post office			
Chama	unincorporated community	81040	37.7189°N 105.2989°W	7,881 feet (2,402 m)
Clover	former post office			
Codo	unincorporated community	81055	37.5022°N 105.1472°W	8,474 feet (2,583 m)
Consolidated	former post office			
Cuchara	unincorporated community	81055	37.3792°N 105.1003°W	8,468 feet (2,581 m)
Cuchara Camps	see Cuchara			
Cuchara Junction	unincorporated community	81089	37.6670°N 104.6861°W	5,955 feet (1,815 m)
Cucharas	former post office			
Delcarbon	ghost town	81089	37.7125°N 104.8769°W	6,342 feet (1,933 m)
Dickson	former post office			
Farisita	unincorporated community	81040, 81089	37.7447°N 105.0714°W	6,650 feet (2,027 m)
Farr	former post office			
Fort Francisco	see Francisco Fort			
Fort Talpa	historic civilian fort	81040		
Francisco Fort	historic civilian fort	81055		
Gardner	census-designated place	81040	37.7833°N 105.1656°W	6,969 feet (2,124 m)
Gordon	former post office			
Grays Ranch	former post office			
Hermosilla	former post office			
Hermosville	former post office			
Hezron	former post office			
Houck	former post office			
Huerfano (1862)	former post office			
Huerfano	former post office			
Huerfano Cañon	see Farisita			
Huerfano Canyon	see Gardner			
Ideal	former post office			
La Plaza de los Leones	see Walsenburg			
La Veta	statutory town	81055	37.5050°N 105.0078°W	7,037 feet (2,145 m)
La Veta Pass	see Veta Pass			
Larimer	former post office			
Lascar	unincorporated community	81069	37.8250°N 104.7486°W	5,692 feet (1,735 m)
Laveta Pass	former post office			
Lester	former post office			
Little Orphan	see Badito			
Maitland	unincorporated community	81089	37.6567°N 104.8339°W	6,263 feet (1,909 m)
Malachite	ghost town	81040	37.7544°N 105.2608°W	7,490 feet (2,283 m)
Mayne	former post office			
McGuire	former post office			
McMillan	former post office			
Monson	unincorporated community	81089	37.5161°N 104.7042°W	6,404 feet (1,952 m)
Mooney	former post office			
Muleshoe	unincorporated community	81055	37.5897°N 105.1825°W	8,793 feet (2,680 m)
Muriel	former post office			
Mustang	former post office			
North Veta	former post office			
Nunda	former post office			
Oakview	former post office			
Occidental	unincorporated community	81055	37.5150°N 105.1069°W	7,717 feet (2,352 m)
Ojo	former post office			
Pauley	former post office			
Pictou	unincorporated community	81089	37.6386°N 104.8136°W	6,280 feet (1,914 m)
Point of Rocks	former post office			
Pryor	unincorporated community	81089	37.5081°N 104.7142°W	6,421 feet (1,957 m)
Quebec	former post office			
Rattlesnake Butte	former post office			
Ravenwood	former post office			
Red Wing	unincorporated community	81040	37.7361°N 105.2900°W	7,726 feet (2,355 m)
Redwing	former post office			
Rockland	former post office			
Round Oak	former post office			
Rouse	unincorporated community	81089	37.4908°N 104.7117°W	6,509 feet (1,984 m)
Saint Marys	former post office			
Santa Clara	former post office			
Scissors	former post office			
Seguro	former post office			
Sharpsdale	former post office			
Shumway	former post office			
Solar	former post office			
Spanish Peak	see La Veta			
Spanish Peaks	former post office			
Strong	unincorporated community	81089	37.7125°N 104.9022°W	6,394 feet (1,949 m)
Tabeguache	former post office			
Talpa	see Farisita			
Tioga	ghost town	81089	37.6989°N 104.9275°W	6,549 feet (1,996 m)
Toltec	former post office			
Tourist‡ (Note: In 1874, county voters selected Walsenburgh as the new seat of Huerfano County, Colorado Territory, and since statehood on August 1, 1876, the seat of Huerfano County, Colorado. On October 20, 1887, Walsenburgh changed its name to Tourist; then changed it back Walsenburgh on November 29, 1887; then shortened it to Walsenburg on December 22, 1892.)	see Walsenburg			
Ute	former post office			
Veta Pass	ghost town	81055	37.5931°N 105.2033°W	9,390 feet (2,862 m)
Walsen	former post office			
Walsenburg†	statutory town	81089	37.6242°N 104.7803°W	6,171 feet (1,881 m)
Walsenburgh‡	see Walsenburg			
Warrantsville	former post office			
Yellowstone Creek	former post office			

== Jackson County ==
Select the OpenStreetMap link at the right to view the location of places in this section.

Place	Type	ZIP Code	Location	Elevation
Bighorn	former post office			
Bockman Lumber Camp	unincorporated community	80480	40.5583°N 105.9658°W	9,045 feet (2,757 m)
Brownlee	unincorporated community	80480	40.7847°N 106.2867°W	8,005 feet (2,440 m)
Butler	former post office			
Canadian	former post office			
Chedsey	former post office			
Coalmont	ghost town	80430	40.5625°N 106.4445°W	8,215 feet (2,504 m)
Cowdrey	unincorporated community	80434	40.8597°N 106.3131°W	7,917 feet (2,413 m)
Crescent	former post office			
Dryer	former post office			
Fort Boettcher	unincorporated community	80480	40.8044°N 106.5439°W	8,327 feet (2,538 m)
Gould	unincorporated community	80480	40.5264°N 106.0267°W	8,921 feet (2,719 m)
Haworth	former post office			
Hebron	unincorporated community	80430	40.5961°N 106.4070°W	8,143 feet (2,482 m)
Higho	former post office			
Kings Canyon	ghost town	80434	40.9269°N 106.2270°W	8,396 feet (2,559 m)
Larand	unincorporated community	80480	40.6225°N 106.2928°W	8,212 feet (2,503 m)
Northgate	unincorporated community	80434	40.8858°N 106.2942°W	7,920 feet (2,414 m)
Old Homestead	unincorporated community	80480	40.4403°N 106.1436°W	8,773 feet (2,674 m)
Otis	former post office			
Owl	former post office			
Paulus	former post office			
Pearl	ghost town	80434	40.9852°N 106.5470°W	8,406 feet (2,562 m)
Peneold	see Gould			
Rand	unincorporated community	80473	40.4539°N 106.1814°W	8,629 feet (2,630 m)
Roach	former post office			
Ruction	former post office			
Spicer	former post office			
Stelbars Lindland	unincorporated community	80480	40.5744°N 106.0647°W	8,661 feet (2,640 m)
Tyner	former post office			
Valdai	former post office			
Walden† (Note: Walden has been the seat of Jackson County, Colorado since the county was created on May 5, 1909.)	statutory town	80480	40.7316°N 106.2836°W	8,097 feet (2,468 m)
Willey Lumber Camp	unincorporated community	80480	40.5028°N 105.8992°W	9,678 feet (2,950 m)
Zirkel	former post office			

== Jefferson County ==
Select the OpenStreetMap link at the right to view the location of places in this section.

Place	Type	ZIP Code	Location	Elevation
Alkire Estates	Arvada neighborhood	80005	39.8431°N 105.1450°W	5,597 feet (1,706 m)
Alta Vista	Arvada neighborhood	80004	39.8072°N 105.0936°W	5,354 feet (1,632 m)
Apple Meadows	Arvada neighborhood	80403	39.8047°N 105.2119°W	5,801 feet (1,768 m)
Applewood	census-designated place	80401	39.7578°N 105.1625°W	5,581 feet (1,701 m)
Applewood Glen	Lakewood neighborhood	80215	39.7453°N 105.1344°W	5,568 feet (1,697 m)
Applewood Grove	unincorporated community	80401	39.7436°N 105.1458°W	5,610 feet (1,710 m)
Applewood Village	Wheat Ridge neighborhood	80033	39.7656°N 105.1331°W	5,472 feet (1,668 m)
Arapahoe‡ (Note: On November 28, 1859, the Provisional Government of the Territory of Jefferson created 12 counties, with Arapahoe City as the first seat of Jefferson County, Jefferson Territory. On January 17, 1860, Arapahoe City shortened its name to Arapahoe. On November 6, 1860, the Jefferson Territory moved the seat of Jefferson County to Golden City.)	see Arapahoe City			
Arapahoe City‡	ghost town	80403	39.7750°N 105.1784°W	5,576 feet (1,700 m)
Archer (Note: The site of Archer, Colorado is submerged in Chatfield Reservoir.)	ghost town	80125	39.5333°N 105.0769°W	5,433 feet (1,656 m)
Archers	former post office			
Arvada (Note: The City of Arvada straddles both Jefferson and Adams counties.)	home rule city	80001-80007; 80403	39.8020°N 105.0873°W	5,345 feet (1,629 m)
Aspen Park	census-designated place	80433	39.5392°N 105.2947°W	8,143 feet (2,482 m)
Beaver Brook	former post office			
Bellevue	see Shaffers Crossing			
Bellevue Acres	unincorporated community	80127	39.6217°N 105.1422°W	5,830 feet (1,777 m)
Belmar	Lakewood neighborhood	80226		
Bergen Park	unincorporated community	80439	39.6914°N 105.3617°W	7,792 feet (2,375 m)
Bow Mar (Note: The Town of Bow Mar straddles both Arapahoe and Jefferson counties.)	statutory town	80123	See also Bow Mar in Arapahoe County.	
Bridle Dale	unincorporated community	80005	39.8436°N 105.1156°W	5,577 feet (1,700 m)
Brightside	former post office			
Broken Arrow Acres	unincorporated community	80433	39.5028°N 105.3267°W	8,484 feet (2,586 m)
Brook Forest (Note: The Brook Forest CDP straddles both Jefferson and Clear Creek counties.)	census-designated place	80439	39.5794°N 105.3819°W	8,035 feet (2,449 m)
Brownville	former post office			
Buffalo Creek	unincorporated community	80425	39.3867°N 105.2703°W	6,749 feet (2,057 m)
Cambridge Park	Lakewood neighborhood	80033	39.7711°N 105.1128°W	5,381 feet (1,640 m)
Cameo Estates	Arvada neighborhood	80005	39.8386°N 105.1531°W	5,522 feet (1,683 m)
Candelas	Arvada neighborhood	80007		
Candlelight	Arvada neighborhood	80004	39.8036°N 105.1536°W	5,568 feet (1,697 m)
Carmody Estates	Lakewood neighborhood	80227	39.6783°N 105.1136°W	5,646 feet (1,721 m)
Cheeseman	former post office			
Churchhill Downs	unincorporated community	80005	39.8439°N 105.1217°W	5,610 feet (1,710 m)
Cliff	former post office	80421		
Cliffdale	unincorporated community	80421	39.4086°N 105.3764°W	6,985 feet (2,129 m)
Cloudcrest	former post office			
Club Crest	Arvada neighborhood	80005	39.8325°N 105.1025°W	5,607 feet (1,709 m)
Coal Creek CDP	census-designated place	80403	39.9064°N 105.3775°W	8,586 feet (2,617 m)
Cody Park	unincorporated community	80401	39.7158°N 105.2703°W	7,352 feet (2,241 m)
College West Estates	Lakewood neighborhood	80228	39.7186°N 105.1422°W	5,823 feet (1,775 m)
Columbine (Note: The Columbine CDP straddles both Jefferson and Arapahoe counties.)	census-designated place	80128	39.5878°N 105.0694°W	5,545 feet (1,690 m)
Columbine Acres	Arvada neighborhood	80002	39.7950°N 105.0722°W	5,289 feet (1,612 m)
Columbine Hills	unincorporated community	80128	39.5739°N 105.0650°W	5,456 feet (1,663 m)
Columbine Knolls	unincorporated community	80128	39.5775°N 105.0772°W	5,554 feet (1,693 m)
Conifer	unincorporated community	80433	39.5211°N 105.3053°W	8,261 feet (2,518 m)
Country View Estates	Arvada neighborhood	80005	39.8397°N 105.1303°W	5,636 feet (1,718 m)
Country West	unincorporated community	80127	39.6189°N 105.1336°W	5,774 feet (1,760 m)
Countryside	Westminster neighborhood	80021	39.8858°N 105.1194°W	5,495 feet (1,675 m)
Crestmont Heights	Arvada neighborhood	80004	39.8056°N 105.1328°W	5,476 feet (1,669 m)
Crestview Villa	unincorporated community	80401	39.7378°N 105.1811°W	5,810 feet (1,771 m)
Creswell	former post office			
Critchell	former post office			
Crosson	former post office	80421		
Crossons	unincorporated community	80421	39.3992°N 105.3864°W	7,162 feet (2,183 m)
Crystal Lake	former post office			
Dakota Ridge	census-designated place	80127	39.6192°N 105.1343°W	5,768 feet (1,758 m)
Daniels	former post office			
Daniels Garden	Lakewood neighborhood	80401	39.7353°N 105.1328°W	5,610 feet (1,710 m)
Dawson	former post office			
Deane	former post office			
Deansbury	former post office			
Deercreek	former post office			
Deermont	unincorporated community	80127	39.5075°N 105.1844°W	6,972 feet (2,125 m)
Dome Rock	unincorporated community	80433	39.4217°N 105.1975°W	6,283 feet (1,915 m)
Doubleheader Ranch	unincorporated community	80465	39.5589°N 105.2461°W	8,012 feet (2,442 m)
Downtown Arvada	see Olde Town Arvada			
East Pleasant View	census-designated place	80401	39.7277°N 105.1572°W	5,837 feet (1,779 m)
East Tincup	former post office			
Edgemont	Lakewood neighborhood	80401	39.7311°N 105.1308°W	5,627 feet (1,715 m)
Edgewater	home rule city	80214	39.7530°N 105.0642°W	5,381 feet (1,640 m)
El Rancho	unincorporated community	80439	39.6986°N 105.3336°W	7,762 feet (2,366 m)
Eldorado Estates	unincorporated community	80007	39.8386°N 105.1867°W	5,748 feet (1,752 m)
Elephant Park	unincorporated community	80439	39.6289°N 105.3628°W	7,585 feet (2,312 m)
Elk Creek	former post office			
Enterprise	former post office	80127		
Evergreen	census-designated place	80439, 80437	39.6333°N 105.3172°W	7,073 feet (2,156 m)
Fairmount	census-designated place	80403	39.7931°N 105.1712°W	5,591 feet (1,704 m)
Far Horizon	Arvada neighborhood	80003	39.8497°N 105.0572°W	5,404 feet (1,647 m)
Fenders	unincorporated community	80465	39.5739°N 105.2169°W	7,044 feet (2,147 m)
Ferndale	unincorporated community	80425	39.4061°N 105.2555°W	6,581 feet (2,006 m)
Forks	former post office			
Forkscreek	former post office			
Foxton	unincorporated community	80433	39.4244°N 105.2361°W	6,457 feet (1,968 m)
Gems Park Estates	unincorporated community	81122	39.5956°N 105.2367°W	7,290 feet (2,222 m)
Genesee	census-designated place	80401	39.6858°N 105.2728°W	7,657 feet (2,334 m)
Genesee Ridge	unincorporated community	80401	39.6814°N 105.2722°W	7,500 feet (2,286 m)
Gillespie	former post office			
Gilman	former post office			
Glenelk	unincorporated community	80470	39.4631°N 105.3564°W	7,808 feet (2,380 m)
Golden† (Note: On November 6, 1860, the Provisional Government of the Territory of Jefferson designated Golden City as the new seat of Jefferson County, Jefferson Territory, and on November 13, 1860, it designated Golden City as its new territorial capital. On November 1, 1861, the new Territory of Colorado created 17 original counties, with Golden City as the original seat of Jefferson County, Colorado Territory. Golden City served as the third capital of the Colorado Territory from August 14, 1862, until December 9, 1967. On June 27, 1876, Golden City shortened its name to Golden, and since statehood on August 1, 1876, Golden has been the seat of Jefferson County, Colorado.)	home rule city	80401-80403; 80419, 80439	39.7555°N 105.2211°W	5,673 feet (1,729 m)
Golden City ⁂	see Golden			
Golden Gate	former post office	80403		
Golden Heights	Golden neighborhood	80401	39.7200°N 105.1794°W	5,988 feet (1,825 m)
Golden Meadows	unincorporated community	80465	39.5778°N 105.2267°W	7,405 feet (2,257 m)
Green Gables	Lakewood neighborhood	80227	39.6783°N 105.0972°W	5,607 feet (1,709 m)
Green Mountain	Lakewood neighborhood	80228	39.6883°N 105.1297°W	5,784 feet (1,763 m)
Green Mountain Village	Lakewood neighborhood	80228	39.6980°N 105.1325°W	5,823 feet (1,775 m)
Green Valley	Wheat Ridge neighborhood	80033	39.7814°N 105.0942°W	5,331 feet (1,625 m)
Green Valley Acres	unincorporated community	80433	39.5022°N 105.3119°W	8,304 feet (2,531 m)
Grotto	former post office			
Hackberry Hills	Arvada neighborhood	80003-80005	39.8289°N 105.0781°W	5,505 feet (1,678 m)
Happy Valley Gardens	Wheat Ridge neighborhood	80033	39.7767°N 105.1044°W	5,354 feet (1,632 m)
Heritage Dells	Golden neighborhood	80401	39.7194°N 105.2125°W	6,161 feet (1,878 m)
Herndon	former post office			
Herzman Mesa	unincorporated community	80439	39.6105°N 105.3103°W	7,598 feet (2,316 m)
Hidden Valley	unincorporated community	80439	39.6947°N 105.3392°W	7,759 feet (2,365 m)
Highland Gardens	Wheat Ridge neighborhood	80033	39.7675°N 105.0628°W	5,433 feet (1,656 m)
Hillcrest Heights	Wheat Ridge neighborhood	80033	39.7789°N 105.0861°W	5,384 feet (1,641 m)
Hiwan Hills	unincorporated community	80439	39.6403°N 105.3300°W	7,343 feet (2,238 m)
Homestead	unincorporated community	80465	39.5639°N 105.2289°W	7,398 feet (2,255 m)
Homewood Park	unincorporated community	80127	39.5428°N 105.1978°W	6,719 feet (2,048 m)
Huntington Heights	Arvada neighborhood	80004	39.8244°N 105.0931°W	5,614 feet (1,711 m)
Hutchinson	see Conifer			
Idledale	census-designated place	80453	39.6689°N 105.2432°W	6,598 feet (2,011 m)
Indian Hills	census-designated place	80454	39.6167°N 105.2372°W	6,850 feet (2,088 m)
Indian Springs Village	unincorporated community	80470	39.4319°N 105.3206°W	7,228 feet (2,203 m)
Indian Tree	Arvada neighborhood	80005	39.8383°N 105.0844°W	5,454 feet (1,662 m)
Indians Hills	unincorporated community	80454		
Jefferson	see Morrison			
Joylan	see Idledale			
Junction	former post office			
Kassler	unincorporated community	80125	39.4905°N 105.0947°W	5,499 feet (1,676 m)
Ken Caryl	census-designated place	80127	39.5758°N 105.1122°W	5,761 feet (1,756 m)
Ken Caryl Ranch North	unincorporated community	80127	39.5953°N 105.1725°W	6,181 feet (1,884 m)
Kittredge	census-designated place	80457	39.6547°N 105.2997°W	6,916 feet (2,108 m)
Koldeway	Arvada neighborhood	80004	39.8078°N 105.1031°W	5,358 feet (1,633 m)
Lake Arbor	Arvada neighborhood	80003	39.8478°N 105.0769°W	5,436 feet (1,657 m)
Lakecrest	Arvada neighborhood	80005	39.8503°N 105.1200°W	5,571 feet (1,698 m)
Lakeside	statutory town	80212	39.7772°N 105.0558°W	5,364 feet (1,635 m)
Lakeview	Wheat Ridge neighborhood	80033	39.7811°N 105.0756°W	5,374 feet (1,638 m)
Lakeview Meadows	Arvada neighborhood	80003	39.8236°N 105.0764°W	5,486 feet (1,672 m)
Lakewood	home rule city	80225-80228; 80214-80215; 80235-80236; 80123, 80232; 80401	39.7047°N 105.0814°W	5,518 feet (1,682 m)
Lamar Heights	Arvada neighborhood	80003		
Lamb	former post office			
Lamplighter	Arvada neighborhood	80005	39.8300°N 105.1247°W	5,531 feet (1,686 m)
Leawood	unincorporated community	80123	39.6036°N 105.0636°W	5,472 feet (1,668 m)
Leyden	unincorporated community	80007	39.8447°N 105.1842°W	5,656 feet (1,724 m)
Leyden Junction	Arvada neighborhood	80005	39.8461°N 105.1483°W	5,673 feet (1,729 m)
Littleton (Note: Voters selected Littleton as the seat of South Arapahoe County, Colorado, which was renamed and re-created on November 15, 1902. Littleton has remained the seat since the county name was changed back to Arapahoe County, Colorado on April 11, 1903. The City of Littleton now also extends into Jefferson and Douglas counties.)	home rule city	80120-80130; 80160-80166	See also Littleton in Arapahoe County.	
Lone Pine Estates	unincorporated community	80465	39.5950°N 105.2453°W	7,287 feet (2,221 m)
Longview	unincorporated community	80433	39.4175°N 105.1939°W	6,227 feet (1,898 m)
Lyndale Park	Arvada neighborhood	80003	39.8164°N 105.0739°W	5,413 feet (1,650 m)
Magic Mountain	former post office			
Maplewood Acres	Arvada neighborhood	80004	39.8247°N 105.1225°W	5,433 feet (1,656 m)
Marshdale	unincorporated community	80439	39.5925°N 105.3122°W	7,776 feet (2,370 m)
Meadow Lake	Arvada neighborhood	80004	39.8069°N 105.1422°W	5,538 feet (1,688 m)
Meadow Wood Farms	unincorporated community	80007	39.8381°N 105.1797°W	5,673 feet (1,729 m)
Meadowbrook Heights	unincorporated community	80128	39.5622°N 105.0883°W	5,571 feet (1,698 m)
Medlin	former post office			
Melrose	Wheat Ridge neighborhood	80033	39.7731°N 105.0908°W	5,440 feet (1,658 m)
Mesa Heights	Arvada neighborhood	80005	39.8392°N 105.1269°W	5,663 feet (1,726 m)
Michigan House	former post office			
Morrison	home rule town	80465	39.6536°N 105.1911°W	5,764 feet (1,757 m)
Mount Morrison	see Morrison			
Mount Olivet	unincorporated community	80033	39.7875°N 105.1422°W	5,495 feet (1,675 m)
Mount Vernon Club Place	unincorporated community	80401	39.7228°N 105.2939°W	7,894 feet (2,406 m)
Mount Vernon (Note: Mount Vernon was the home of Territorial Governor Robert Williamson Steele and administrative capital of the Provisional Government of the Territory of Jefferson.)	ghost town	80401	39.6939°N 105.2054°W	6,317 feet (1,925 m)
Mountain Meadow Heights	unincorporated community	80439	39.6608°N 105.3092°W	7,060 feet (2,152 m)
Mountain Park	former post office			
Mountain View	home rule town	80212	39.7744°N 105.0555°W	5,387 feet (1,642 m)
Mountain View Estates	Lakewood neighborhood	80401	39.7275°N 105.1439°W	5,751 feet (1,753 m)
Normandy Estates	unincorporated community	80128	39.5875°N 105.0606°W	5,495 feet (1,675 m)
North Green Valley	Wheat Ridge neighborhood	80033	39.7808°N 105.1019°W	5,348 feet (1,630 m)
Northwood Acres	unincorporated community	80007	39.8361°N 105.1694°W	5,604 feet (1,708 m)
Oak Park	Arvada neighborhood	80005	39.8358°N 105.1211°W	5,636 feet (1,718 m)
Oberon Acres	Arvada neighborhood	80005	39.8392°N 105.1156°W	5,627 feet (1,715 m)
Oehlmann Park	unincorporated community	80433	39.5189°N 105.2592°W	8,448 feet (2,575 m)
Olde Town Arvada	Arvada neighborhood	80002	39.8002°N 105.0814°W	5,335 feet (1,626 m)
Olinger Gardens	Wheat Ridge neighborhood	80214	39.7569°N 105.0569°W	5,404 feet (1,647 m)
Olio	former post office			
Oxyoke	unincorporated community	80135	39.3030°N 105.1983°W	6,339 feet (1,932 m)
Panorama Heights	unincorporated community	80401	39.7222°N 105.2403°W	7,349 feet (2,240 m)
Paradise Acres	Arvada neighborhood	80005	39.8289°N 105.1006°W	5,577 feet (1,700 m)
Paradise Hills	unincorporated community	80401	39.7125°N 105.2517°W	7,421 feet (2,262 m)
Paramount Heights	Wheat Ridge neighborhood	80215	39.7578°N 105.1142°W	5,591 feet (1,704 m)
Park Siding	see Foxton			
Park Slope	Arvada neighborhood	80002	39.7933°N 105.0908°W	5,325 feet (1,623 m)
Parkway Estates	Arvada neighborhood	80003	39.8369°N 105.0761°W	5,453 feet (1,662 m)
Phillipsburg	census-designated place	80127	39.5383°N 105.1869°W	6,585 feet (2,007 m)
Pine	unincorporated community	80470	39.4100°N 105.3239°W	6,818 feet (2,078 m)
Pine Grove	see Pine			
Pine Junction	unincorporated community	80470	39.4661°N 105.3958°W	8,448 feet (2,575 m)
Plainview	unincorporated community	80403	39.8936°N 105.2764°W	6,798 feet (2,072 m)
Platte Cañon	former post office	80127		
Pleasant View	unincorporated community	80401	39.7342°N 105.1717°W	5,771 feet (1,759 m)
Quaker Acres	unincorporated community	80007	39.8306°N 105.1872°W	5,702 feet (1,738 m)
Rainbow Hills	unincorporated community	80439	39.7133°N 105.3386°W	7,602 feet (2,317 m)
Rainbow Ridge	Arvada neighborhood	80002	39.7939°N 105.1342°W	5,505 feet (1,678 m)
Ralston	former post office			
Ralston Estates	Arvada neighborhood	80004	39.8164°N 105.1467°W	5,499 feet (1,676 m)
Ralston Valley	Arvada neighborhood	80004	39.8269°N 105.1519°W	5,512 feet (1,680 m)
Ralstons	former post office			
Resort	former post office			
Ridge	former post office	80002		
Riva Chase	unincorporated community	80401	39.6961°N 105.2572°W	7,293 feet (2,223 m)
Riverview	unincorporated community	80425	39.3975°N 105.2680°W	6,654 feet (2,028 m)
Rolling Hills	Wheat Ridge neighborhood	80033	39.7656°N 105.1153°W	5,453 feet (1,662 m)
Rosedale	unincorporated community	80439	39.6400°N 105.3830°W	7,490 feet (2,283 m)
Sanatorium	former post office	80214		
Scenic Heights	Arvada neighborhood	80004	39.8128°N 105.0850°W	5,436 feet (1,657 m)
Semper	Arvada neighborhood	80003	39.8561°N 105.0647°W	5,436 feet (1,657 m)
Shaffers Crossing	unincorporated community	80470	39.4786°N 105.3683°W	7,927 feet (2,416 m)
Sheridan Green	Westminster neighborhood	80020	39.8967°N 105.0650°W	5,299 feet (1,615 m)
Sherwood Farms	Arvada neighborhood	80007	39.8322°N 105.1747°W	5,591 feet (1,704 m)
Sierra Estates	Arvada neighborhood	80005	39.8358°N 105.1047°W	5,591 feet (1,704 m)
Sierra Vista	Arvada neighborhood	80005	39.8358°N 105.1133°W	5,623 feet (1,714 m)
Sky Village	unincorporated community	80465	39.5505°N 105.2472°W	7,877 feet (2,401 m)
Skyline Estates	Arvada neighborhood	80002	39.7961°N 105.1181°W	5,466 feet (1,666 m)
Snow Water Springs	unincorporated community	80135	39.2647°N 105.2169°W	6,358 feet (1,938 m)
South Platte	unincorporated community	80135	39.4075°N 105.1714°W	6,086 feet (1,855 m)
Sphinx Park	unincorporated community	80470	39.4244°N 105.3150°W	7,051 feet (2,149 m)
Spivak	Lakewood neighborhood	80214	39.7447°N 105.0680°W	5,407 feet (1,648 m)
Spring Hill	unincorporated community	80465	39.6353°N 105.1503°W	5,768 feet (1,758 m)
Spring Mesa	Arvada neighborhood	80007	39.8378°N 105.1986°W	5,866 feet (1,788 m)
Spring Ranch	unincorporated community	80401	39.6997°N 105.3156°W	7,562 feet (2,305 m)
Sprucedale	unincorporated community	80439	39.5889°N 105.3522°W	7,625 feet (2,324 m)
Stanley Park	unincorporated community	80439	39.6183°N 105.2928°W	7,808 feet (2,380 m)
Starbuck	see Idledale			
Strontia Springs	former post office			
Sunland	Arvada neighborhood	80003	39.8328°N 105.0747°W	5,436 feet (1,657 m)
Sunstream	Westminster neighborhood	80021	39.8678°N 105.1014°W	5,423 feet (1,653 m)
Superior (Note: The Town of Superior straddles both Boulder and Jefferson counties.)	statutory town	80027	See also Superior in Boulder County.	
Supreme Estates	unincorporated community	80007	39.8283°N 105.1714°W	5,597 feet (1,706 m)
Symes	former post office	80135		
The Bluffs	unincorporated community	80465	39.5864°N 105.2261°W	7,297 feet (2,224 m)
The Highlands	Arvada neighborhood	80003	39.8328°N 105.0683°W	5,453 feet (1,662 m)
The Pond	Arvada neighborhood	80005	39.8542°N 105.1056°W	5,525 feet (1,684 m)
The Ridge At Stony Creek	unincorporated community	80128	39.5856°N 105.0942°W	5,656 feet (1,724 m)
The Valley	unincorporated community	80127	39.5753°N 105.1628°W	6,089 feet (1,856 m)
Tinsdale	former post office			
Troutdale	unincorporated community	80439	39.6369°N 105.3480°W	7,195 feet (2,193 m)
Trumbull	unincorporated community	80135	39.2630°N 105.2194°W	6,394 feet (1,949 m)
Turkey Creek	former post office			
Twin Forks	unincorporated community	80465	39.5928°N 105.2197°W	6,896 feet (2,102 m)
Twin Spruce	unincorporated community	80403	39.8892°N 105.3586°W	7,982 feet (2,433 m)
Urmston	former post office	80470		
Vermilion	former post office			
Vernon Gardens	unincorporated community	80401	39.7325°N 105.1883°W	5,856 feet (1,785 m)
Village of Five Parks	Arvada neighborhood	80005	39.8486°N 105.1597°W	5,696 feet (1,736 m)
Wah Keeney Park	unincorporated community	80439	39.6603°N 105.3405°W	7,464 feet (2,275 m)
Wallace Village	Westminster neighborhood	80021	39.8833°N 105.0928°W	5,394 feet (1,644 m)
Walnut Grove	Westminster neighborhood	80021	39.8878°N 105.1033°W	5,394 feet (1,644 m)
Wandcrest Park	unincorporated community	80470	39.4355°N 105.3939°W	8,264 feet (2,519 m)
Waterton	unincorporated community	80125	39.4936°N 105.0886°W	5,482 feet (1,671 m)
Wellington Downs	Arvada neighborhood	80003	39.8072°N 105.0578°W	5,315 feet (1,620 m)
West Meadows	unincorporated community	80127	39.6078°N 105.1392°W	5,850 feet (1,783 m)
West Pleasant View	census-designated place	80401	39.7319°N 105.1784°W	5,823 feet (1,775 m)
Westgate	Lakewood neighborhood	80227	39.6711°N 105.0931°W	5,456 feet (1,663 m)
Westhaven	Wheat Ridge neighborhood	80033	39.7675°N 105.1050°W	5,433 feet (1,656 m)
Westminster (Note: The City of Westminster straddles both Adams and Jefferson counties.)	home rule city	80030-80031; 80035-80036; 80003, 80005; 80020, 80021; 80023, 80221; 80234, 80241; 80260	See also Westminster in Adams County.	
Wheat Ridge	home rule city	80033-80034	39.7661°N 105.0772°W	5,459 feet (1,664 m)
Wildwood	Wheat Ridge neighborhood	80033	39.7706°N 105.1025°W	5,404 feet (1,647 m)
Willow Brook	unincorporated community	80465	39.6078°N 105.1706°W	6,037 feet (1,840 m)
Willow Springs	unincorporated community	80465	39.6117°N 105.1811°W	6,165 feet (1,879 m)
Willowville	former post office			
Wood Creek	Westminster neighborhood	80003	39.8342°N 105.0578°W	5,354 feet (1,632 m)
Wood Run	Arvada neighborhood	80005	39.8467°N 105.1042°W	5,518 feet (1,682 m)

== Kiowa County ==
Select the OpenStreetMap link at the right to view the location of places in this section.

Place	Type	ZIP Code	Location	Elevation
Arden	former post office			
Arlington	unincorporated community	81021	38.3361°N 103.3433°W	4,222 feet (1,287 m)
Bee (Note: On September 20, 1887, Bee changed its name to Sheridan Lake; then changed it back to Bee on October 15, 1887; then changed it back again to Sheridan Lake on October 27, 1887. Sheridan Lake served as the original seat of Kiowa County, Colorado since the county was created on April 11, 1889, until 1902.)	see Sheridan Lake			
Brandon	census-designated place	81071	38.4464°N 102.4396°W	3,927 feet (1,197 m)
Chivington	ghost town	81036	38.4364°N 102.5435°W	3,891 feet (1,186 m)
Dayton	former post office			
Diston	former post office			
Eads† (Note: Eads has served as the seat of Kiowa County, Colorado since 1902.)	statutory town	81036	38.4806°N 102.7819°W	4,219 feet (1,286 m)
Fergus	former post office			
Galatea	unincorporated community	81045	38.5044°N 103.0246°W	4,383 feet (1,336 m)
Haswell	statutory town	81045	38.4522°N 103.1630°W	4,544 feet (1,385 m)
Hawkins	unincorporated community	81036	38.4939°N 102.9324°W	4,350 feet (1,326 m)
Kilburn	former post office			
Queen Beach	former post office			
Segreganset	former post office			
Sheridan Lake‡	statutory town	81071	38.4667°N 102.2921°W	4,072 feet (1,241 m)
Stuart	unincorporated community	81071	38.4714°N 102.1946°W	4,032 feet (1,229 m)
Sweetwater	former post office			
Towner	census-designated place	81071	38.4704°N 102.0805°W	3,930 feet (1,198 m)
Water Valley	former post office			

== Kit Carson County ==
Select the OpenStreetMap link at the right to view the location of places in this section.

Place	Type	ZIP Code	Location	Elevation
Ashland	former post office			
Avendale	former post office			
Baltzer	former post office			
Beaverton	former post office			
Beloit	former post office			
Berry	former post office			
Bethune	statutory town	80805	39.3042°N 102.4246°W	4,259 feet (1,298 m)
Bonny	former post office			
Bowser	former post office			
Burlington† (Note: Burlington has been the seat of Kit Carson County, Colorado since the county was created on April 11, 1889.)	home rule city	80807	39.3061°N 102.2694°W	4,170 feet (1,271 m)
Carey	former post office			
Carlisle	former post office			
Chapin	former post office			
Claremont	see Stratton			
Cole	former post office			
Dodgeville	former post office			
Elphis	former post office			
Farley	former post office			
Flagler	statutory town	80815	39.2930°N 103.0672°W	4,941 feet (1,506 m)
Goff	former post office			
Hanover	former post office			
Hoyt	former post office			
Kukkuk	former post office			
Landsman	former post office			
Loco	former post office			
Morris	former post office			
Oranola	former post office			
Oriska	former post office			
Peconic	unincorporated community	80807	39.3208°N 102.1488°W	4,009 feet (1,222 m)
Seibert	statutory town	80834	39.2992°N 102.8691°W	4,711 feet (1,436 m)
Stratton	statutory town	80836	39.3033°N 102.6046°W	4,413 feet (1,345 m)
Tuttle	ghost town	80836	39.4974°N 102.5109°W	4,022 feet (1,226 m)
Valley	former post office			
Vansville	former post office			
Vona	statutory town	80861	39.3036°N 102.7430°W	4,505 feet (1,373 m)
Wallett	former post office			
West Burlington	unincorporated community	80807	39.3033°N 102.3096°W	4,196 feet (1,279 m)
Yale	former post office			

== La Plata County ==
Select the OpenStreetMap link at the right to view the location of places in this section.

Place	Type	ZIP Code	Location	Elevation
Allison	unincorporated community	81137	37.0244°N 107.4881°W	6,217 feet (1,895 m)
Animas	see Animas City			
Animas City	ghost town	81301	37.3017°N 107.8688°W	6,565 feet (2,001 m)
Bayfield	statutory town	81122	37.2256°N 107.5981°W	6,900 feet (2,103 m)
Bondad	unincorporated community	81303	37.0458°N 107.8762°W	6,033 feet (1,839 m)
Breen	unincorporated community	81326	37.1925°N 108.0779°W	7,346 feet (2,239 m)
Camp at Animas City	see Fort Flagler			
Carbon Junction	unincorporated community	81301	37.2375°N 107.8667°W	6,411 feet (1,954 m)
Cascade	unincorporated community	81301	37.6033°N 107.7626°W	7,789 feet (2,374 m)
Castelar	former post office			
Columbus	unincorporated community	81122	37.3278°N 107.6301°W	7,283 feet (2,220 m)
Content	former post office			
Dix	former post office			
Durango† (Note: Durango has served as the seat of La Plata County, Colorado since 1881.)	home rule city	81301-81303	37.2753°N 107.8801°W	6,532 feet (1,991 m)
Elco	former post office			
Emery	former post office			
Falfa	unincorporated community	81303	37.2131°N 107.7909°W	6,906 feet (2,105 m)
Florida	unincorporated community	81303	37.2150°N 107.7526°W	6,729 feet (2,051 m)
Fort Flagler	historic civilian stockade	81301		
Fort Lewis (1880-1891)	historic U.S. Army post	81326		
Gem Village	unincorporated community	81122	37.2192°N 107.6373°W	6,831 feet (2,082 m)
Grandview	unincorporated community	81303	37.2275°N 107.8270°W	6,785 feet (2,068 m)
Griffth	unincorporated community	81303	37.2144°N 107.7962°W	6,903 feet (2,104 m)
Grommet	see Oxford			
Hermosa	unincorporated community	81301	37.4153°N 107.8353°W	6,644 feet (2,025 m)
Hesperus	unincorporated community	81326	37.2861°N 108.0395°W	8,091 feet (2,466 m)
Hewit	former post office			
Hynes	former post office			
Ignacio	statutory town	81137	37.1150°N 107.6331°W	6,453 feet (1,967 m)
Kline	unincorporated community	81326	37.1442°N 108.1195°W	6,942 feet (2,116 m)
La Boca	unincorporated community	81137	37.0111°N 107.6020°W	6,168 feet (1,880 m)
La Plata	unincorporated community	81326	37.3972°N 108.0631°W	9,308 feet (2,837 m)
La Posta	unincorporated community	81303	37.1253°N 107.8951°W	6,178 feet (1,883 m)
Laboca	former post office	81137		
Laplata	former post office	81326		
Logtown	unincorporated community	81122	37.5517°N 107.5914°W	11,562 feet (3,524 m)
Loma Linda	unincorporated community	81303	37.2242°N 107.7959°W	6,946 feet (2,117 m)
Los Pinos	see Bayfield			
Marvel	census-designated place	81329	37.1125°N 108.1267°W	6,736 feet (2,053 m)
Mayday	ghost town	81326	37.3506°N 108.0767°W	8,734 feet (2,662 m)
Meserole	former post office			
Murnane	former post office			
Oxford	unincorporated community	81137	37.1689°N 107.7142°W	6,601 feet (2,012 m)
Pargin	former post office			
Parrott	see Parrott City			
Parrott City‡ (Note: On January 31, 1876, county voters selected Parrott City as the new seat of La Plata County, Colorado Territory, and after statehood on August 1, 1876, the seat of La Plata County, Colorado until 1881.)	ghost town			
Perin	former post office			
Perins	former post office			
Pineriver	former post office			
Piñon Acres	unincorporated community	81301	37.2278°N 107.8173°W	6,795 feet (2,071 m)
Porter	former post office			
Red Mesa	former post office			
Redmesa	unincorporated community	81326	37.0944°N 108.1704°W	6,549 feet (1,996 m)
Rockwood	unincorporated community	81301	37.4908°N 107.8020°W	7,359 feet (2,243 m)
Southern Ute	census-designated place	81137	37.0749°N 107.5933°W	6,565 feet (2,001 m)
Tacoma	unincorporated community	81301	37.5236°N 107.7820°W	7,297 feet (2,224 m)
Tiffany	unincorporated community	81137	37.0328°N 107.5381°W	6,342 feet (1,933 m)
Toltec	former post office			
Trimble	unincorporated community	81301	37.3903°N 107.8465°W	6,578 feet (2,005 m)
Tuckerville	unincorporated community	81122	37.4925°N 107.4853°W	10,653 feet (3,247 m)
Uncapaghre	former post office	81403		
Vallecito	unincorporated community	81122	37.3753°N 107.5839°W	7,582 feet (2,311 m)
Viceto	see Vallecito			
Walls	former post office			
Young	former post office			

== Lake County ==
Select the OpenStreetMap link at the right to view the location of places in this section.

Place	Type	ZIP Code	Location	Elevation
Adelaide	ghost town	80461	39.2472°N 106.2581°W	10,833 feet (3,302 m)
Alexander	former post office			
Alicante	former post office			
Arkansas Junction	former post office			
Balltown	unincorporated community	81251	39.0778°N 106.2811°W	9,035 feet (2,754 m)
Birdseye	unincorporated community	80461	39.3111°N 106.2275°W	10,207 feet (3,111 m)
Bond	former post office			
Brumley	unincorporated community	81251	39.0894°N 106.5428°W	10,607 feet (3,233 m)
Busk	former post office			
Climax	ghost town	80429	39.3689°N 106.1836°W	11,342 feet (3,457 m)
Dayton‡ (Note: Dayton served as the seat of Lake County, Colorado Territory from 1866 until 1868.)	ghost town			
Dodsville	former post office			
Everett	unincorporated community	81211	39.0678°N 106.5020°W	10,118 feet (3,084 m)
Finntown	see Adelaide			
Henry	former post office			
Hope	former post office			
Howland	former post office			
Ibex	former post office			
Interlaken	former post office			
Ironhill	former post office			
Kobe	unincorporated community	80461	39.1294°N 106.3147°W	9,190 feet (2,801 m)
Leadville† (Note: Leadville has served as the seat of Lake County, Colorado since it was re-created on February 10, 1879.)	statutory city	80461, 80429	39.2508°N 106.2925°W	10,157 feet (3,096 m)
Leadville Army Air Field	historic U.S. Army air field	80461	39.2833°N 106.3333°W	9,873 feet (3,009 m)
Leadville Junction	unincorporated community	80461	39.2586°N 106.3397°W	9,767 feet (2,977 m)
Leadville North	census-designated place	80461	39.2600°N 106.3113°W	9,990 feet (3,045 m)
Lourette	ghost town			
Malta	ghost town	80461	39.2294°N 106.3509°W	9,590 feet (2,923 m)
Mount Massive Lakes	unincorporated community	80461	39.1522°N 106.3006°W	9,472 feet (2,887 m)
Oro	see Oro City			
Oro City‡ (Note: On November 1, 1861, the Territory of Colorado created 17 original counties, with Oro City as the original seat of Lake County, Colorado Territory, serving until 1866.)	ghost town	80461	39.2353°N 106.2522°W	10,709 feet (3,264 m)
Park City	see Adelaide			
Resurrection Mill	unincorporated community	80461	39.2353°N 106.2770°W	10,276 feet (3,132 m)
Saint Kevin	former post office			
Snowden	former post office			
Soda Spring	former post office			
Stringtown	unincorporated community	80461	39.2336°N 106.3192°W	9,813 feet (2,991 m)
Tabor	former post office			
Tacoma	former post office			
Tacony	former post office			
Tennessee Pass	former post office			
Twin Lakes	census-designated place	81251	39.1037°N 106.3190°W	9,600 feet (2,926 m)
Wortman	former post office			

== Larimer County ==
Select the OpenStreetMap link at the right to view the location of places in this section.

Place	Type	ZIP Code	Location	Elevation
Adams	former post office			
Alfalfa	former post office			
Alford	former post office			
Andersonville	unincorporated community	80524	40.5939°N 105.0572°W	4,948 feet (1,508 m)
Arkins	former post office			
Arrowhead	unincorporated community	80524	40.5791°N 105.0244°W	4,925 feet (1,501 m)
Auroria	see Laporte			
Beaver Point	unincorporated community	80517	40.3644°N 105.5444°W	7,654 feet (2,333 m)
Bellvue	unincorporated community	80512	40.6264°N 105.1716°W	5,131 feet (1,564 m)
Berthoud (Note: The Town of Berthoud straddles both Larimer and Weld counties.)	statutory town	80513	40.3083°N 105.0811°W	5,033 feet (1,534 m)
Berts Corner	unincorporated community	80513	40.3078°N 105.1028°W	5,075 feet (1,547 m)
Big Elk Meadows	unincorporated community	80540	40.2619°N 105.4303°W	7,526 feet (2,294 m)
Big Thompson	see Fort Namaqua			
Black Hollow Junction	unincorporated community	80524	40.5961°N 105.0294°W	4,961 feet (1,512 m)
Boiler	former post office			
Box Elder (1876)	former post office			
Box Elder (1884)	former post office			
Box Prairie	unincorporated community	80512	40.5814°N 105.4689°W	8,287 feet (2,526 m)
Boxelder	former post office			
Bristol	former post office			
Browns Corner	unincorporated community	80537	40.4075°N 105.0589°W	4,990 feet (1,521 m)
Buckeye	unincorporated community	80549	40.8272°N 105.0950°W	5,663 feet (1,726 m)
Buckhorn	former post office			
Buckingham	Fort Collins neighborhood	80524	40.5905°N 105.0661°W	4,951 feet (1,509 m)
Bulger	former post office	80549	40.7936°N 104.9825°W	5,499 feet (1,676 m)
Bush	former post office			
Camp Collins	see Fort Collins			
Campion	unincorporated community	80537	40.3494°N 105.0778°W	5,115 feet (1,559 m)
Cedar Cove	unincorporated community	80537	40.4158°N 105.2655°W	5,591 feet (1,704 m)
Chambers	former post office			
Chambers Lake	former post office			
Cherokee Park	former post office	80536		
Colona	see Laporte			
Cowdrey	former post office			
Drake	unincorporated community	80515	40.4319°N 105.3403°W	6,161 feet (1,878 m)
Drakes	unincorporated community	80525	40.5541°N 105.0800°W	5,030 feet (1,533 m)
Eggers	unincorporated community	80512	40.6908°N 105.4875°W	6,821 feet (2,079 m)
Elk Horn	former post office			
Estes Park	statutory town	80517, 80511	40.3772°N 105.5217°W	7,530 feet (2,295 m)
Findale	former post office			
Forks	former post office			
Fort Collins (1862)	historic U.S. Army fort	80535		
Fort Collins (1864)	historic U.S. Army fort	80521		
Fort Collins† (Note: In 1868, county voters selected Fort Collins as the new seat of Larimer County, Colorado Territory, and since statehood on August 1, 1876, the seat of Larimer County, Colorado.)	home rule city	80521-80528; 80553	40.5853°N 105.0844°W	5,003 feet (1,525 m)
Fort Namaqua	historic trading post	80537		
Giddings	unincorporated community	80524	40.6214°N 105.0105°W	5,023 feet (1,531 m)
Glen Comfort	unincorporated community	81515	40.3936°N 105.4403°W	7,172 feet (2,186 m)
Glen Echo	unincorporated community	80512	40.6986°N 105.5853°W	7,162 feet (2,183 m)
Glen Haven	unincorporated community	80532	40.4539°N 105.4492°W	7,231 feet (2,204 m)
Glendevey	unincorporated community	82063	40.8103°N 105.9350°W	8,294 feet (2,528 m)
Gleneyre	former post office			
Goodell Corner	unincorporated community	80545	40.7353°N 105.5811°W	8,156 feet (2,486 m)
Harmony	unincorporated community	80528	40.5233°N 105.0436°W	4,970 feet (1,515 m)
Home	former post office			
Honnold	former post office			
Horsetooth Heights	unincorporated community	80526	40.5044°N 105.1541°W	5,509 feet (1,679 m)
Idylwilde	unincorporated community	80512	40.7008°N 105.6547°W	7,533 feet (2,296 m)
Indian Meadows	unincorporated community	80512	40.7005°N 105.5519°W	7,034 feet (2,144 m)
Johnstown (Note: The Town of Johnstown straddles both Weld and Larimer counties.)	home rule town	80534	See also Johnstown in Weld County.	
Kelim	unincorporated community	80534	40.4066°N 104.9508°W	4,938 feet (1,505 m)
Kenyon Corner	unincorporated community	80524	40.6394°N 105.0728°W	5,112 feet (1,558 m)
Kerns	unincorporated community	80547	40.5075°N 104.9444°W	4,833 feet (1,473 m)
Kilburn	former post office			
Kings Corner	unincorporated community	80537	40.3783°N 105.0733°W	4,934 feet (1,504 m)
Kinikinik (Note: Kinikinik is a nine-letter palindrome.)	unincorporated community	80512	40.7125°N 105.7381°W	7,730 feet (2,356 m)
La Porte‡ (Note: On November 28, 1859, the Provisional Government of the Territory of Jefferson created 12 counties, with La Porte as the seat of Heele County, Jefferson Territory. On November 1, 1861, the new Territory of Colorado created 17 original counties, with La Porte as the original seat of Larimer County, Colorado Territory, serving until 1868. On December 21, 1894, La Porte changed its name to Laporte.)	see Laporte			
Laporte	census-designated place	80535	40.6264°N 105.1378°W	5,062 feet (1,543 m)
Little Dam	unincorporated community	80538	40.4222°N 105.2228°W	5,322 feet (1,622 m)
Little Thompson	see Berthoud			
Livermore	unincorporated community	80536	40.7944°N 105.2172°W	5,896 feet (1,797 m)
Logcabin	former post office			
Longs Peak	former post office			
Loveland	home rule city	80537-80539; 80534	40.3978°N 105.0750°W	4,987 feet (1,520 m)
Loveland Heights	unincorporated community	80515	40.3897°N 105.4642°W	7,306 feet (2,227 m)
Manhattan	ghost town	80512	40.7322°N 105.6000°W	8,474 feet (2,583 m)
Mariano's Crossing	see Fort Namaqua			
Mason	former post office			
Masonville	unincorporated community	80541	40.4875°N 105.2108°W	5,390 feet (1,643 m)
McClellands	unincorporated community	80525	40.5280°N 105.0808°W	5,046 feet (1,538 m)
Meyers Corner	unincorporated community	80524	40.6680°N 105.0194°W	5,161 feet (1,573 m)
Michigan	former post office			
Midway	unincorporated community	80537	40.4303°N 105.3228°W	6,096 feet (1,858 m)
Miner	former post office			
Miraville	see Fort Namaqua			
Mishawaka	unincorporated community	80512	40.6872°N 105.3658°W	5,876 feet (1,791 m)
Modena's Crossing	see Fort Namaqua			
Moraine	see Moraine Park			
Moraine Park	former post office	80517		
Mountain View	unincorporated community	80521	40.5925°N 105.1291°W	5,089 feet (1,551 m)
Mountearl	former post office			
Namaqua	see Loveland			
Namaqua Station	see Fort Namaqua			
New Liberty	former post office			
New Windsor	see Windsor			
Norfolk	unincorporated community	80612	40.9108°N 104.9697°W	5,899 feet (1,798 m)
Old Roach	ghost town	82063	40.9244°N 106.1172°W	9,380 feet (2,859 m)
Olympus Heights	unincorporated community	80517	40.3778°N 105.4839°W	7,487 feet (2,282 m)
Omega	unincorporated community	80526	40.5397°N 105.0805°W	5,043 feet (1,537 m)
Owl Canyon	unincorporated community	80535	40.7625°N 105.1755°W	5,741 feet (1,750 m)
Petra	see Stout			
Pinewood	former post office			
Pinewood Springs	unincorporated community	80540	40.2733°N 105.3567°W	6,696 feet (2,041 m)
Pinkhamton	former post office			
Poudre City	ghost town	80512		
Poudre Park	unincorporated community	80512	40.6861°N 105.3047°W	5,679 feet (1,731 m)
Pullen	former post office			
Red Feather Lakes	census-designated place	80545	40.8025°N 105.5917°W	8,346 feet (2,544 m)
Redmond	unincorporated community	80528	40.4789°N 105.0408°W	4,925 feet (1,501 m)
Reds Place	unincorporated community	82063	40.7305°N 105.8717°W	8,406 feet (2,562 m)
Rex	unincorporated community	80535	40.7889°N 105.1783°W	5,922 feet (1,805 m)
Rustic	unincorporated community	80512	40.6993°N 105.5813°W	7,162 feet (2,183 m)
Saint Cloud	former post office	80536		
Sinnard	unincorporated community	80524	40.5883°N 105.0033°W	4,944 feet (1,507 m)
Spencer Heights	unincorporated community	80512	40.6741°N 105.7845°W	7,904 feet (2,409 m)
Stout (Note: Most of the town of Stout is now submerged in Horsetooth Reservoir.)	ghost town			
Stove Prairie Landing	unincorporated community	80512	40.6825°N 105.3892°W	6,079 feet (1,853 m)
The Forks	former post office			
Timnath (Note: The Town of Timnath straddles both Larimer and Weld counties.)	home rule town	80547	40.5291°N 104.9853°W	4,869 feet (1,484 m)
Trail Ridge	former post office	80517		
Trilby Corner	unincorporated community	80525	40.4947°N 105.0775°W	5,036 feet (1,535 m)
Valentine	Loveland post office	80537		
Virginia Dale	unincorporated community	80536		
Waltonia	unincorporated community	80515	40.4139°N 105.3630°W	6,512 feet (1,985 m)
Waverly	unincorporated community	80524	40.7364°N 105.0766°W	5,322 feet (1,622 m)
Wellington	statutory town	80549	40.7039°N 105.0086°W	5,203 feet (1,586 m)
Westlake	former post office			
Wheatland	former post office			
Wilds	former post office			
Windsor (Note: The Town of Windsor straddles both Weld and Larimer counties.)	home rule town	80550-80551	See also Windsor in Weld County.	
Winona	former post office			

== Las Animas County ==
Select the OpenStreetMap link at the right to view the location of places in this section.

Place	Type	ZIP Code	Location	Elevation
Abeyta	ghost town	81081	37.0797°N 104.1864°W	5,725 feet (1,745 m)
Abeyton	see Gulnare			
Aguilar	statutory town	81020	37.4028°N 104.6533°W	6,388 feet (1,947 m)
Alcreek	former post office			
Alfalfa	former post office			
Andrix	unincorporated community	81049	37.2795°N 103.1927°W	5,394 feet (1,644 m)
Apishapa	former post office			
Atwell	former post office			
Augusta	former post office			
Aylmer	see Bowen			
Barela	unincorporated community	81081	37.1156°N 104.2616°W	5,761 feet (1,756 m)
Beacon	former post office			
Bent Canyon	former post office			
Berwind	ghost town			
Beshoar	ghost town	81082	37.2181°N 104.4066°W	5,922 feet (1,805 m)
Boncarbo	unincorporated community	81024	37.2167°N 104.6950°W	6,877 feet (2,096 m)
Bowen	ghost town			
Branson	statutory town	81027	37.0175°N 103.8844°W	6,270 feet (1,911 m)
Brazil	former post office			
Brodhead	ghost town			
Carsonhart	former post office			
Cedarhurst	former post office			
Chapel	former post office			
Chicosa	former post office			
Clanda	former post office			
Cokedale	statutory town	81082	37.1453°N 104.6211°W	6,319 feet (1,926 m)
Coloflats	see Branson			
Cordova	see Weston			
Cordova Plaza	unincorporated community	81091	37.1334°N 104.8297°W	6,798 feet (2,072 m)
Cuatro	former post office			
Dalerose	former post office			
Davis	former post office			
Dean	former post office			
Delagua	ghost town	81082	37.3400°N 104.6630°W	6,686 feet (2,038 m)
Delhi	unincorporated community	81059	37.6422°N 104.0180°W	5,085 feet (1,550 m)
Dicks	former post office			
Dodsonville	former post office			
Downing	former post office			
Druce	former post office			
Duncan	former post office			
Earl	unincorporated community	81059	37.3333°N 104.2783°W	5,686 feet (1,733 m)
Edenview	former post office			
Edwest	former post office			
El Moro	census-designated place	81082	37.2350°N 104.4491°W	5,879 feet (1,792 m)
Elmoro	see El Moro			
Engle	former post office			
Engleburg	former post office			
Engleville	unincorporated community	81082	37.1495°N 104.4753°W	6,503 feet (1,982 m)
Flues	former post office			
Forbes	unincorporated community	81082	37.2600°N 104.5647°W	6,506 feet (1,983 m)
Forbes Junction	former post office			
Gillett	former post office			
Glenham	see Barela			
Gotera	former post office			
Graycreek	former post office			
Green Canyon	former post office			
Grinnell	former post office			
Gulnare	unincorporated community	81020	37.3172°N 104.7519°W	6,982 feet (2,128 m)
Hastings	former post office			
Hicks	former post office			
Higgins	former post office			
Hoehne	census-designated place	81046	37.2814°N 104.3891°W	5,738 feet (1,749 m)
Hoopup	former post office			
Houghton	unincorporated community	81059	37.5895°N 104.0433°W	5,174 feet (1,577 m)
Humbar	former post office			
Hummel	former post office			
Indianapolis	former post office			
Irwin Canyon	former post office		37.52801667°N 103.26276944°W	
Jansen	census-designated place	81082	37.1572°N 104.5382°W	6,083 feet (1,854 m)
Jaroso	former post office			
Kant	former post office			
Katrina	former post office			
Kazan	former post office			
Kilroy	former post office			
Kim	statutory town	81049	37.2467°N 103.3522°W	5,692 feet (1,735 m)
Laub	former post office			
Link	former post office			
Linwood	former post office			
Lone Oak	former post office			
Ludlow	ghost town	81082	37.3333°N 104.5833°W	6,283 feet (1,915 m)
Lynn	census-designated place	81020	37.4219°N 104.6431°W	6,358 feet (1,938 m)
Madrid	ghost town	81082	37.1276°N 104.6413°W	6,286 feet (1,916 m)
Majestic	former post office			
Maldonado	former post office			
Martinsen	former post office			
Medina Plaza	unincorporated community	81091	37.1278°N 104.7922°W	6,690 feet (2,039 m)
Menger	former post office			
Mesaview	former post office			
Model	unincorporated community	81059	37.3722°N 104.2450°W	5,617 feet (1,712 m)
Monument Park	unincorporated community	81091	37.2070°N 105.0464°W	8,596 feet (2,620 m)
Moore	former post office			
Morley	ghost town	81082		
Officer	former post office			
Onine	former post office			
Parras Plaza	unincorporated community	81091	37.1772°N 104.9564°W	7,487 feet (2,282 m)
Patches	former post office			
Patt	former post office			
Patterson Crossing	ghost town	81081	37.2175°N 104.2083°W	5,418 feet (1,651 m)
Piedmont	unincorporated community	81082	37.1378°N 104.5519°W	6,234 feet (1,900 m)
Plum Valley	former post office			
Powell	former post office			
Primero	ghost town	81082	37.1425°N 104.7417°W	6,814 feet (2,077 m)
Pulaski	former post office			
Ramon	former post office			
Rapson	former post office			
Raton	former post office			
Reilly Canyon	unincorporated community	81020	37.2545°N 104.7100°W	7,162 feet (2,183 m)
Roby	see Model			
Rugby	unincorporated community	81020	37.4700°N 104.6650°W	6,476 feet (1,974 m)
Saint Thomas	unincorporated community	81082	37.1345°N 104.5575°W	6,234 feet (1,900 m)
San Antonia	former post office			
San Isidro	see Abeyta			
San Jose	former post office			
San Miguel	unincorporated community	81081	37.0995°N 104.3955°W	6,850 feet (2,088 m)
San Pedro	see Starkville			
Sarcillo	unincorporated community	81082	37.1256°N 104.7594°W	6,594 feet (2,010 m)
Segundo	census-designated place	81082		
Sequndo	census-designated place	81082	37.1209°N 104.7222°W	6,542 feet (1,994 m)
Simpson	unincorporated community	81059	37.4978°N 104.1672°W	5,620 feet (1,713 m)
Smith Canyon	former post office			
Sopris	ghost town	81082	37.1347°N 104.5644°W	6,234 feet (1,900 m)
Sopris Plaza	unincorporated community	81082	37.1406°N 104.5755°W	6,234 feet (1,900 m)
Springvale	former post office			
Stage Canyon	former post office			
Stamford	former post office			
Starkville	statutory town	81082	37.1153°N 104.5242°W	6,378 feet (1,944 m)
Stockville	former post office			
Stonewall	see Stonewall Gap			
Stonewall Gap	census-designated place	81091	37.1605°N 105.0342°W	7,976 feet (2,431 m)
Strange	former post office			
Tabasco	former post office			
Tercio	ghost town	81091	37.0520°N 104.9967°W	7,736 feet (2,358 m)
Thatcher	unincorporated community	81059		
Tijeras	unincorporated community	81082	37.1259°N 104.6630°W	6,358 feet (1,938 m)
Tobe	unincorporated community	81049	37.2192°N 103.6116°W	5,774 feet (1,760 m)
Tollerburg	former post office			
Torres	unincorporated community	81091	37.0695°N 105.0561°W	8,330 feet (2,539 m)
Trinchera	unincorporated community	81081	37.0422°N 104.0475°W	5,804 feet (1,769 m)
Trinidad† (Note: On February 9, 1866, the Territory of Colorado created Las Animas County, Colorado Territory with Trinidad as its seat until statehood on August 1, 1876, when it became the seat of Las Animas County, Colorado.)	home rule city	81082	37.1695°N 104.5005°W	6,033 feet (1,839 m)
Troy	former post office			
Tyrone	unincorporated community	81059	37.4542°N 104.2083°W	5,541 feet (1,689 m)
Valdez	census-designated place	81082	37.1229°N 104.6907°W	6,499 feet (1,981 m)
Vallorso	unincorporated community	81082	37.2828°N 104.6450°W	6,791 feet (2,070 m)
Varros	former post office			
Vega Ranch	former post office			
Velasquez Plaza	unincorporated community	81091	37.1236°N 104.7825°W	6,729 feet (2,051 m)
Vigil	unincorporated community	81091	37.1611°N 104.9417°W	7,365 feet (2,245 m)
Villegreen	unincorporated community	81049	37.3059°N 103.5202°W	5,643 feet (1,720 m)
Viola	unincorporated community	81082	37.1334°N 104.6005°W	6,234 feet (1,900 m)
Walts Corner	unincorporated community	81081	37.1689°N 103.8800°W	5,801 feet (1,768 m)
Watervale	former post office			
Wenger	former post office			
Weston	census-designated place	81091	37.1459°N 104.8683°W	7,067 feet (2,154 m)
Wootton	former post office			
Wormington	former post office			
Yachita	former post office			
Yeiser	former post office			
Yetta	see Tyrone			
Zamara	unincorporated community	81091	37.1539°N 104.9206°W	7,182 feet (2,189 m)

== Lincoln County ==
Select the OpenStreetMap link at the right to view the location of places in this section.

Place	Type	ZIP Code	Location	Elevation
Amy	former post office			
Arriba	statutory town	80804	39.2861°N 103.2755°W	5,240 feet (1,597 m)
Arroya	former post office			
Bovina	unincorporated community	80818	39.2803°N 103.3852°W	5,348 feet (1,630 m)
Boyero	unincorporated community	80821	38.9428°N 103.2791°W	4,721 feet (1,439 m)
Cable	see Genoa			
Carr Crossing	former post office			
Clifford	unincorporated community	80821	39.0439°N 103.3513°W	4,879 feet (1,487 m)
Cowans	former post office			
Damascus	former post office			
Forder	unincorporated community	80823	38.6808°N 103.7058°W	4,925 feet (1,501 m)
Genoa	statutory town	80818	39.2783°N 103.5002°W	5,604 feet (1,708 m)
Girard	former post office			
Green Knoll	former post office			
Hugo† (Note: Hugo has been the seat of Lincoln County, Colorado since the county was created on April 11, 1889.)	statutory town	80821	39.1361°N 103.4699°W	5,039 feet (1,536 m)
Karval	unincorporated community	80823	38.7333°N 103.5372°W	5,115 feet (1,559 m)
Kendrick	former post office			
Lake Station	former post office	80828		
Limon	statutory town	80828, 80826	39.2639°N 103.6922°W	5,377 feet (1,639 m)
Limon Station	see Limon			
Luslo	former post office			
McCollin	former post office			
Owen	former post office			
Punkin Center	unincorporated community	80821, 81063	38.8519°N 103.7005°W	5,364 feet (1,635 m)
Sanborn	former post office			
Saugus	former post office			
Shaw	unincorporated community	80804	39.5505°N 103.3608°W	5,157 feet (1,572 m)
Swift	former post office			
Wellons	former post office			
Wezel	unincorporated community	80823	38.7983°N 103.4547°W	4,797 feet (1,462 m)
White	former post office			

== Logan County ==
Select the OpenStreetMap link at the right to view the location of places in this section.

Place	Type	ZIP Code	Location	Elevation
American Ranch	former post office			
Armstrong	former post office			
Arnold	see Willard			
Atwood	census-designated place	80722	40.5478°N 103.2697°W	3,993 feet (1,217 m)
Beta	unincorporated community	80741	40.4661°N 103.3788°W	4,072 feet (1,241 m)
Buchanan	unincorporated community	80745	40.8319°N 103.1685°W	4,131 feet (1,259 m)
Buffalo	see Merino			
Calvert	see Fleming			
Chenoa	former post office			
Crook	statutory town	80726	40.8589°N 102.8010°W	3,707 feet (1,130 m)
Dailey	unincorporated community	80728	40.6567°N 102.7238°W	4,144 feet (1,263 m)
Fleming	statutory town	80728	40.6800°N 102.8394°W	4,242 feet (1,293 m)
Ford	unincorporated community	80728	40.7167°N 103.1352°W	3,875 feet (1,181 m)
Fort Moore	former post office			
Fort Wicked (Note: Sterling has been the seat of Logan County, Colorado since the county was created on February 25, 1887.)	historic ranch and stage station	80741		
Galien	unincorporated community	80728	40.6878°N 103.0083°W	4,183 feet (1,275 m)
Godfrey Ranch	see Fort Wicked			
Graylin	former post office			
Griff	unincorporated community	80736	40.7822°N 103.0071°W	3,809 feet (1,161 m)
Iliff	statutory town	80736	40.7592°N 103.0666°W	3,835 feet (1,169 m)
Jessica	unincorporated community	80751	40.7605°N 103.1719°W	3,990 feet (1,216 m)
Kelleys	former post office			
Kelly	former post office			
Laura	former post office			
Le Roy	former post office	80728		
Leroy	unincorporated community	80728	40.5261°N 102.9141°W	4,380 feet (1,335 m)
Lillian Springs	former post office			
Logan	unincorporated community	80751	40.5786°N 103.3583°W	4,104 feet (1,251 m)
Marcott	unincorporated community	80726	40.8786°N 102.7241°W	3,675 feet (1,120 m)
Merino	statutory town	80741	40.4825°N 103.3513°W	4,042 feet (1,232 m)
New Haven	unincorporated community	80728	40.4830°N 102.8363°W	4,262 feet (1,299 m)
Padroni	census-designated place	80745	40.7778°N 103.1727°W	3,999 feet (1,219 m)
Peetz	statutory town	80747	40.9628°N 103.1124°W	4,432 feet (1,351 m)
Proctor	ghost town	80736	40.8069°N 102.9516°W	3,780 feet (1,152 m)
Red Lion	unincorporated community	80726	40.8917°N 102.6769°W	3,648 feet (1,112 m)
Rockland	unincorporated community	80731	40.5105°N 102.7199°W	4,170 feet (1,271 m)
Saint Petersburg	unincorporated community	80728	40.5555°N 102.8171°W	4,229 feet (1,289 m)
Sarinda	former post office			
Selma	unincorporated community	80736	40.7714°N 103.0310°W	3,816 feet (1,163 m)
South Platte	former post office			
Sterling†	home rule city	80751	40.6255°N 103.2077°W	3,937 feet (1,200 m)
Surinda	former post office			
Tobin	unincorporated community	80726	40.8342°N 102.8727°W	3,743 feet (1,141 m)
Twin Mills	unincorporated community	80751	40.5736°N 103.1263°W	4,199 feet (1,280 m)
Westplains	unincorporated community	80745	40.8647°N 103.4977°W	4,350 feet (1,326 m)
Willard	unincorporated community	80741	40.5544°N 103.4863°W	4,337 feet (1,322 m)
Winston	former post office			

- Adams
- Alamosa
- Arapahoe
- Archuleta
- Baca
- Bent
- Boulder
- Broomfield
- Chaffee
- Cheyenne
- Clear Creek
- Conejos
- Costilla
- Crowley
- Custer
- Delta
- Denver
- Dolores
- Douglas
- Eagle
- El Paso
- Elbert
- Fremont
- Garfield
- Gilpin
- Grand
- Gunnison
- Hinsdale
- Huerfano
- Jackson
- Jefferson
- Kiowa
- Kit Carson
- La Plata
- Lake
- Larimer
- Las Animas
- Lincoln
- Logan
- Mesa
- Mineral
- Moffat
- Montezuma
- Montrose
- Morgan
- Otero
- Ouray
- Park
- Phillips
- Pitkin
- Prowers
- Pueblo
- Rio Blanco
- Rio Grande
- Routt
- Saguache
- San Juan
- San Miguel
- Sedgwick
- Summit
- Teller
- Washington
- Weld
- Yuma

== See also ==
- Bibliography of Colorado
- Geography of Colorado
- History of Colorado
- Index of Colorado-related articles
- List of Colorado-related lists
  - List of counties in Colorado
  - List of populated places in Colorado
- Outline of Colorado
