= Gulnare =

Gulnare might refer to:

- Gulnare, Colorado
- Gulnare, South Australia
