= Fort Namaqua =

- Trading post
- Nicknames: Medina's Crossing, Namaqua Station, Mariano's Crossing, Big Thompson, Miraville
- Location of the historical marker at Namaqua Park, Loveland
- Coordinates: 40°23′59″N 105°7′19″W
- Country: United States
- State: Colorado
- County: Larimer
- Town: Loveland

Fort Namaqua, some of its other names being Mariano's Crossing and Namaqua Station, was a trading post from 1858 or 1859. It was located in the present-day city of Loveland, Colorado in Larimer County, Colorado. In 1862, it became a stage station for travelers along the foothills to Denver. A fort was built at the site after 60 horses were driven off the property. Medina also developed a small settlement with people from his hometown of Taos, New Mexico. The site was named Namaqua in 1868, with the establishment of a post office. Buildings were used until the 1920s and were later dismantled. A historical marker is located at Namaqua Park, near the site of the former fort and station. A copper sculpture honors Mariano Medina at the site of the Mariano Medina Family Cemetery.

== Mariano Medina ==
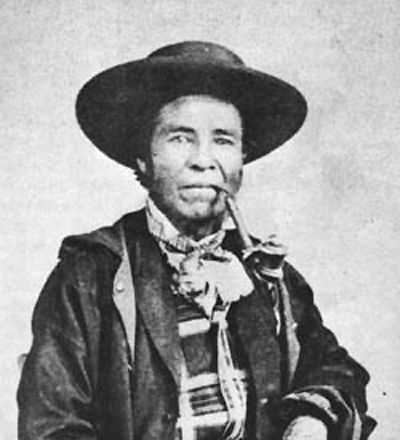
Mariano Medina (died 1878), founder of Fort Namaqua and the Namaqua settlement

Mariano Medina (also Modena and Modina), born in Taos in the province of Santa Fe de Nuevo México (now the state of New Mexico), was of Native American and Spanish heritage. His father was a Castilian, who came to North America from Spain.

Medina had been a fur trapper and trader, working for the American Fur Company. He was a scout and interpreter on expeditions for the United States Army and officials for eleven years, throughout the western frontier. He served out of and Fort Bridger and Fort Laramie in Wyoming. He worked for and with General Albert Sidney Johnston on the Salt Lake expedition (Utah War), John C. Frémont, Kit Carson, Captain Randolph B. Marcy, the Bents (Charles and William Bent), and Captain Joseph R. Walker. He was among the most revered frontiersmen, on par with Jim Bridger, Kit Carson, and Jim Baker. From the sketch of his life, it "has been one of ceaseless activity, hazard and privation, his Indian fights and skirmishes far outnumber his years, and his hair-breadth escapes seem almost miraculous."

In 1858, he came to northern Colorado with his wife, Marie "Tacenecy" Papin, five children, and servants from the San Luis Valley to establish the Fort Namaqua trading post and stage station, one of the earliest businesses in the pre-state history of Colorado. He reportedly spoke thirteen languages; he spoke Spanish and English, and likely spoke some French and Indian dialects, as his wife was Native American and there were French fur trappers in the area.

The trading post was located alongside the Overland Trail where it crossed the Big Thompson River. Medina established a toll bridge across the river and settlement, Namaqua, with a school, church, and a post office. Medina operated a farm in the area. He and his family were the first permanent settlers in what is now Loveland, Colorado.

Four of Medina's children died between 1864 and 1872. Medina's wife died in 1874 and Medina died in 1878. The Medina family members were buried .5 miles (0.80 km) from their house in a cemetery, now a historic landmark in southwest Loveland, Colorado. The Loveland Historical Society engaged Olivia Lowe to create the copper-panel sculpture, "Gazing at Longs Peak", in memory of Medina. The eight bodies that had been buried at the cemetery had been moved many years ago to Namaqua Park and, until the sculpture was added, all that had remained was a marker of stones to identify the site of Medina's cemetery.

== Namaqua ==
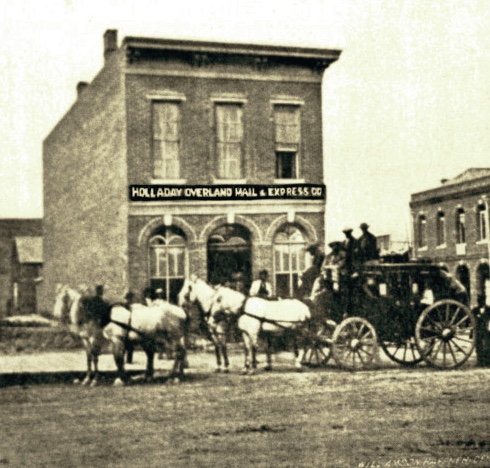
The Holladay Overland Mail & Express Co. stagecoach office was on the southwest corner of fifteenth and Market Streets in Denver. Circa 1860s.

The first permanent settler in the Big Thompson Valley, Medina established a trading post called Fort Namaqua. He recruited people from his hometown of Taos to help build log buildings for the settlement called Namaqua of 100 people. It was located on the crossing of several trails, including the Texas and Overland Trails, the Denver and Laramie Trails, and branches off the South Platte, and old Oregon Trails. The fort was located west of the present-day Namaqua Road and on the north side of the Big Thompson River, where Medina built and operated a toll bridge.

Sixty of his horses were looted by Ute people in 1861. He followed the Utes for 25 miles and shot one of them as the remaining men fled. He then built a stone fort on the north side of the Big Thompson, with six gun ports. The walls were up to 20 inches thick and the roof was built with logs, sandstone slabs, and topped with a foot of earth.

In 1862, the fort became a stage station for the Holladay Overland Stage company along the Cherokee Trail, specifically in this area between Laporte and Denver. The Namaqua, Colorado Territory, post office operated from January 28, 1868, until January 3, 1879. Colorado became a state on August 1, 1876. After the fort was no longer needed and abandoned, the stone building was converted to an ice house. Until the 1920s, the log buildings were continuing to be used. They then fell into disrepair and were dismantled, except for Medina's cabin which was restored and preserved at the Loveland museum. Medina's grave was moved to Namaqua Park in 1960. A marker was placed in the park near the site of the former stage station.

== See also ==
- Bibliography of Colorado
- Geography of Colorado
- History of Colorado
- Index of Colorado-related articles
  - Sarah Milner Smith, pioneer teacher near Namaqua
- List of Colorado-related lists
  - List of populated places in Colorado
  - List of post offices in Colorado
- Outline of Colorado
