= Antoine Janis =

French-American Fur Trader

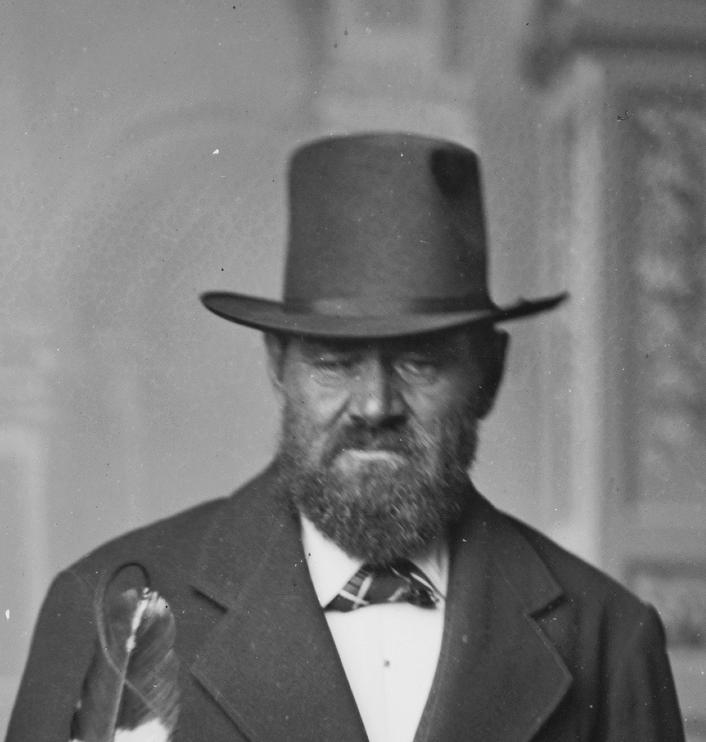
Antoine Janis

Antoine Janis (March 26, 1824–1890) was a 19th-century French-American fur trader and the first white homesteader in Larimer County, Colorado, in the United States. The first recorded permanent white settler in northern Colorado, he founded the town of Laporte (then known as Colona) in 1858.

== Biography ==
Janis was born in Missouri to a French father and a mulatto mother. As a young man, in his early years Antoine traveled with his father on trading caravans from Missouri to the Green River. In 1836 he may have traveled with his father on a caravan along the Cache la Poudre River valley in present-day Larimer County. It is possible but not established that the river obtained its name during this trip.

In 1844 he journeyed west on his own, working with brother Nicholas as a scout and interpreter out of Fort Laramie, where he married First Elk Woman of the Oglala Sioux tribe. While returning from a trip to Mexico, he passed through present-day Colorado along the Poudre Valley, arriving at the spot where the Poudre emerges from the foothills. He was particularly taken by the valley, calling it "the loveliest spot on earth." At the time, the area was not open to settlement but was part of the hunting territory of the Arapaho and Cheyenne. Janis staked out a squatter's claim on the river bottom just west of present-day Laporte, in June 1844; with the expectation of returning to homestead there once it was possible to legally file the claim.

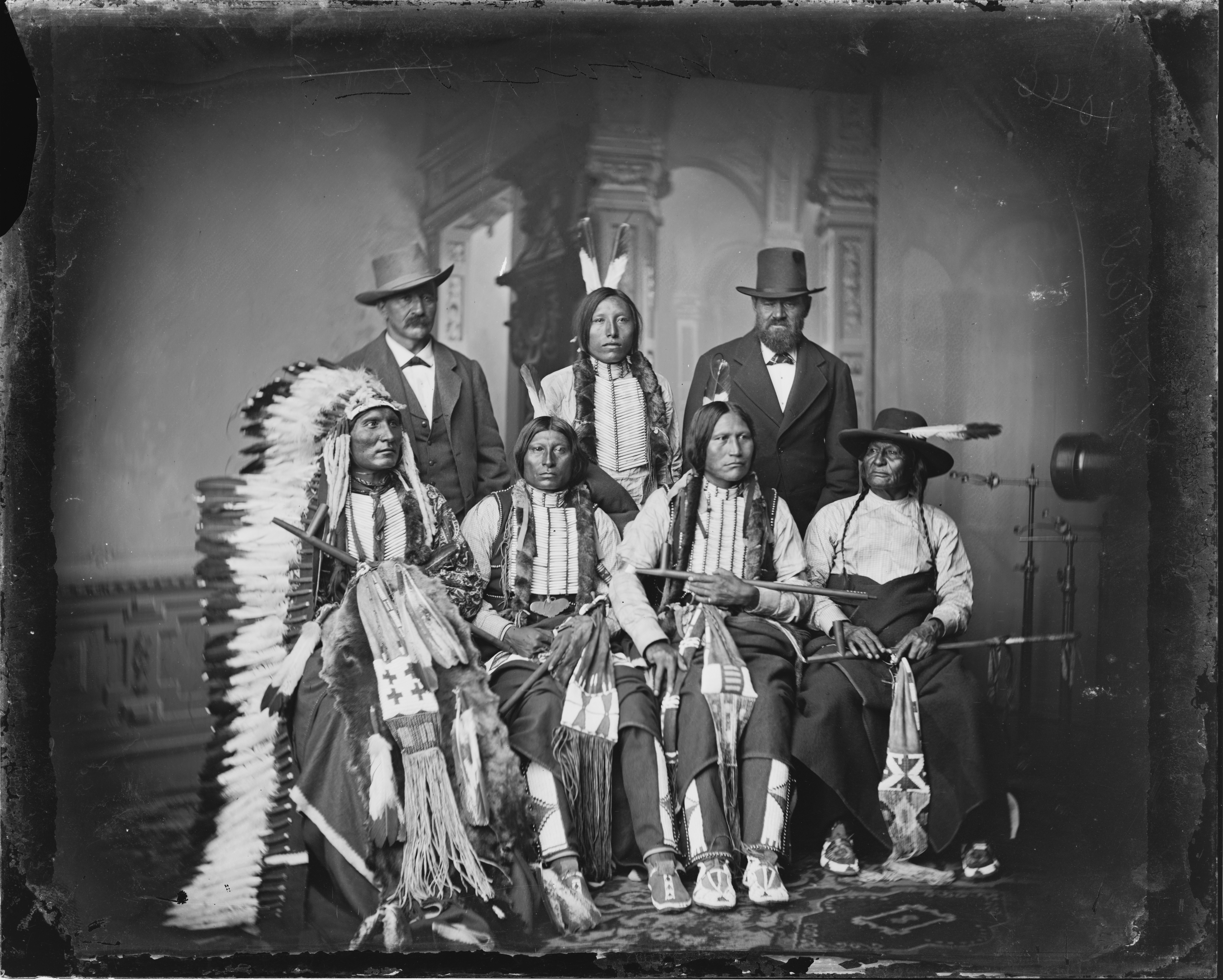
Janis with a group of Sioux and Arapaho, 1877. Friday, seated at lower right, often camped with his band along the Poudre River near where Janis staked his claim.

The opening up of the western Nebraska Territory to homesteading allowed Janis to return to the area 1858 with his claim filed. He was accompanied by a party of other homesteaders from Fort Laramie, including John B. Provost, his brothers Francis and Nicholas Janis, Antoine LeBeau, Tood Randall, E.W. Raymond, B. Goodman, Laroque Bosquet (aka: Rock Bush) and Oliver Morrisette. His arrival to the area with his wife came one year before the flood of prospectors in the 1859 Colorado Gold Rush. Janis settled in the area with approximately 150 lodges of Arapaho, who accompanied him to the spot. With the other members of his party, he founded the town of Colona, which later became Laporte, the first white community in Larimer County. The following year he erected a small wooden house on the south side of Poudre River where he kept a grocery and saloon. The cabin was moved to Fort Collins and can now be visited at the Fort Collins Public Library.

He continued to live in the area until 1878, when a general order from the federal government forced his wife to move to the Pine Ridge Indian Reservation in South Dakota. Janis sold his cabin and accompanied his wife to the reservation, where he died in 1890.

In 1939, Janis' wooden homestead cabin was moved from Laporte to its present location adjacent to the Fort Collins Museum and Discovery Science Center in Fort Collins. The cabin is part of the museum grounds open to the public and has been partially restored for tours.
