= Pine, Colorado =

Unincorporated community in Jefferson County, CO, USA

- Unincorporated community
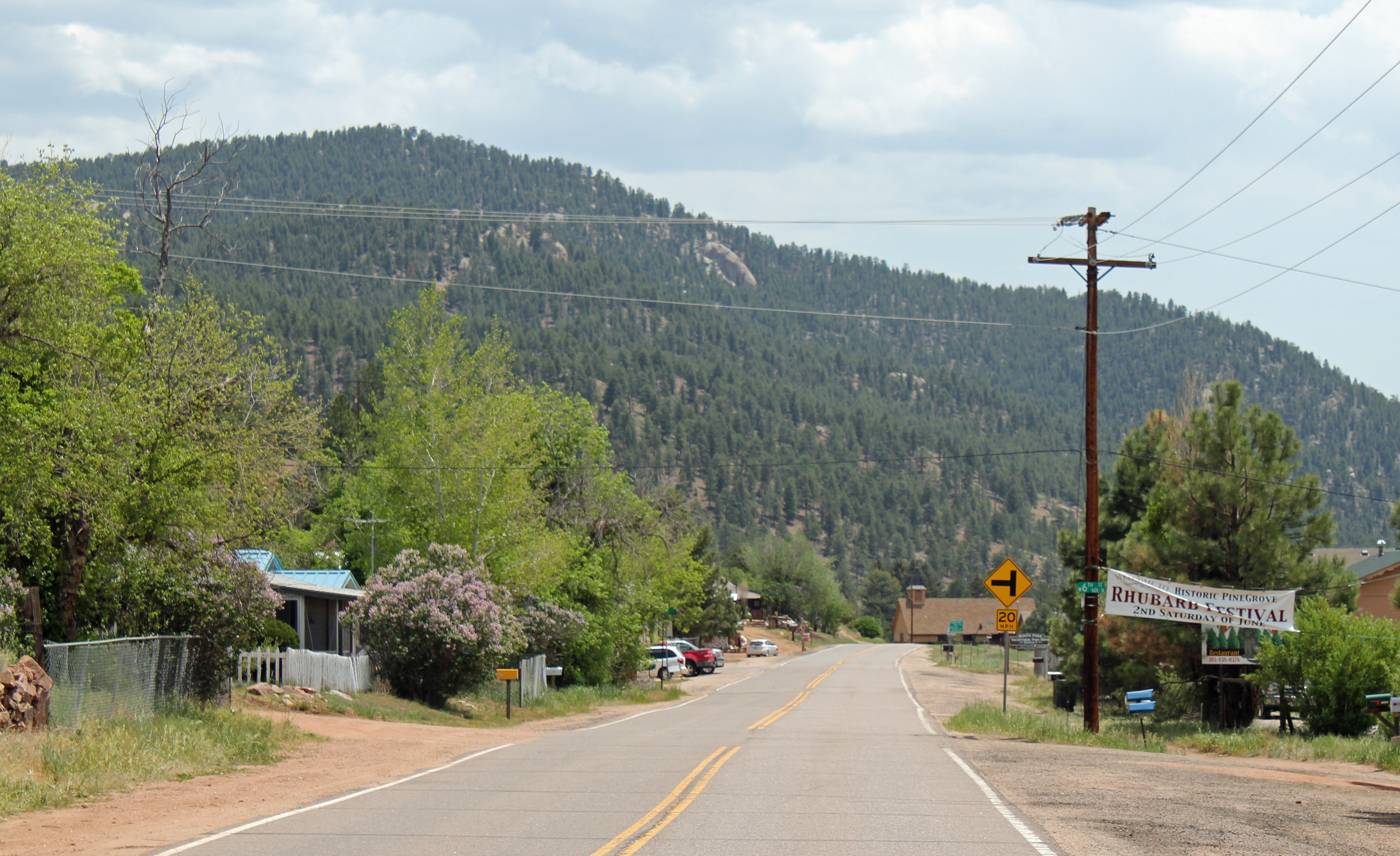
- Pine in 2013

- Location within Colorado Location within the United States
- Coordinates: 39°24′36″N 105°19′19″W
- Country: United States
- State: Colorado
- County: Jefferson
- Time zone: UTC-7 (MST)
  - Summer (DST): UTC-6 (MDT)
- ZIP code: 80470
- Website: historicpinegrove.com

Pine is an unincorporated community and a U.S. Post Office in Jefferson County, Colorado, United States. The Pine Post Office has the ZIP Code 80470.

The historic town is also called Pine Grove. Every summer from 1988 through 2022, the residents held an annual Rhubarb Festival which was sponsored by the Pine-Elk Creek Improvement Association (PECIA). PECIA is a 501(c)(3) charitable organization that was founded in 1947.
