= Shaffers Crossing, Colorado =

Unincorporated community in Jefferson County, CO, USA

- Unincorporated community
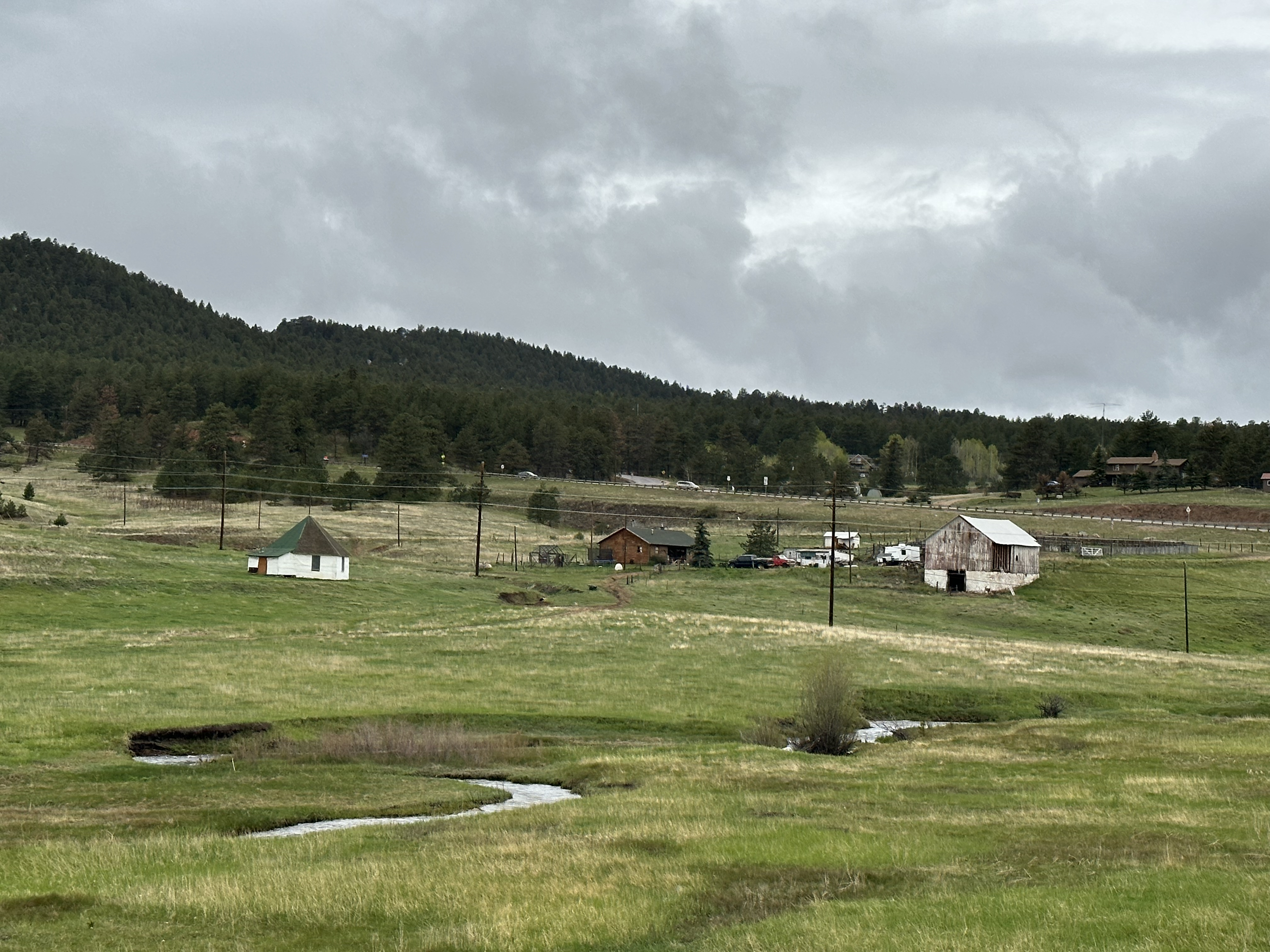
- Overlooking Shaffers Crossing

- Location of Shaffers Crossing within the state of Colorado
- Coordinates: 39°28′43″N 105°22′06″W
- Country: United States
- State: Colorado
- County: Jefferson
- Named for: Samuel Shaffer
- Elevation: 7,927 ft (2,416 m)
- Time zone: UTC−7 (MST)
  - Summer (DST): UTC−6 (MDT)
- Area code(s): 303, 720, 983
- GNIS feature ID: 183298

Shaffers Crossing is an unincorporated community in Jefferson County, in the U.S. state of Colorado.

The community was named after Samuel Shaffer, the original owner of the site.
