= Rustic, Colorado =

Unincorporated community in Larimer County, CO, USA

- Unincorporated community
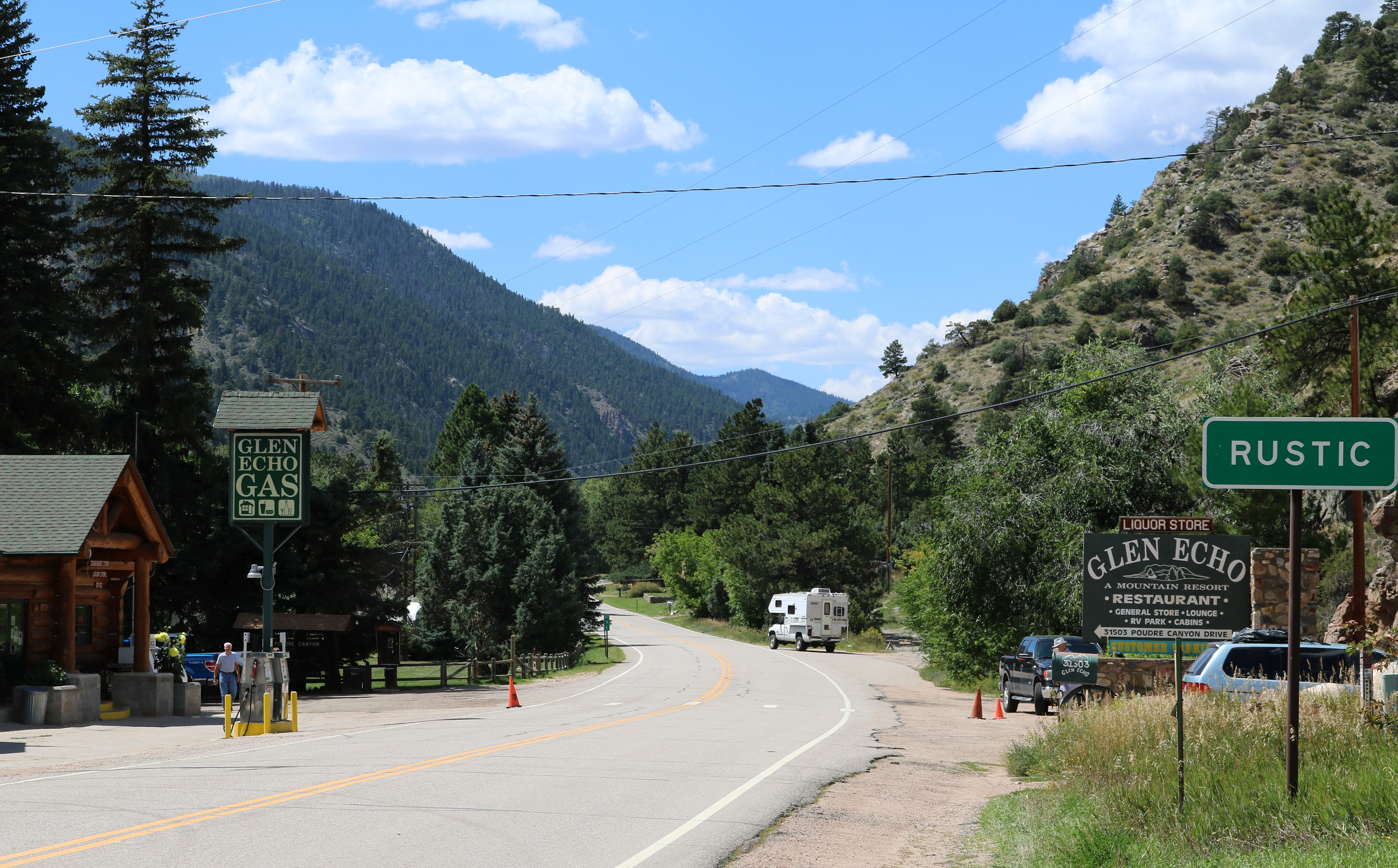
- Rustic and Poudre Canyon Road, looking west

- Location within Colorado Location within the United States
- Coordinates: 40°41′57″N 105°34′53″W
- Country: United States
- State: Colorado
- County: Larimer
- Elevation: 7,165 ft (2,184 m)
- Time zone: UTC-7 (Mountain (MST))
  - Summer (DST): UTC-6 (MDT)
- Area code: 970
- GNIS feature ID: 177128

Rustic is an unincorporated community in Larimer County, Colorado, United States. Rustic is located on State Highway 14 and the Cache La Poudre River 27.3 miles (43.9 km) west-northwest of Fort Collins. The community borders Glen Echo to the west.

In 1881, S.B. Stewart built the Rustic Hotel at this location. It soon became a popular summer tourist resort.

The town of Rustic was established in 1882.

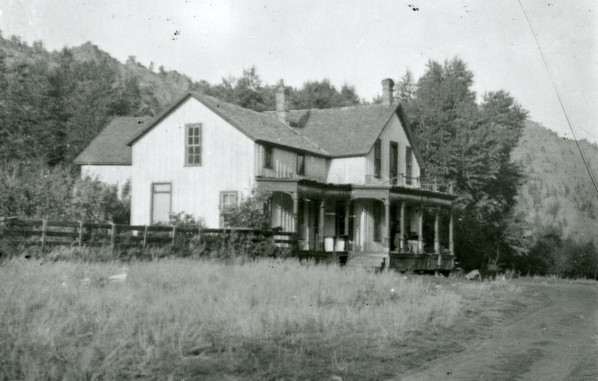
Rustic Hotel, c. 1910

== Climate ==
According to the Köppen Climate Classification system, Rustic has a continental climate, abbreviated "Dfb" on climate maps. The hottest temperature recorded in Rustic was 92 °F (33 °C) on July 22, 2005 and June 17, 2021, while the coldest temperature recorded was −27 °F (−33 °C) on March 4, 2019.

Climate data for Rustic, Colorado, 1991–2020 normals, extremes 1993–present
Month	Jan	Feb	Mar	Apr	May	Jun	Jul	Aug	Sep	Oct	Nov	Dec	Year
Record high °F (°C)	60 (16)	60 (16)	70 (21)	74 (23)	84 (29)	92 (33)	92 (33)	90 (32)	90 (32)	78 (26)	69 (21)	64 (18)	92 (33)
Mean maximum °F (°C)	52.4 (11.3)	51.7 (10.9)	61.8 (16.6)	68.2 (20.1)	75.5 (24.2)	84.9 (29.4)	86.7 (30.4)	85.4 (29.7)	81.7 (27.6)	72.5 (22.5)	62.5 (16.9)	53.1 (11.7)	87.6 (30.9)
Mean daily maximum °F (°C)	35.7 (2.1)	36.4 (2.4)	43.7 (6.5)	49.3 (9.6)	59.3 (15.2)	71.7 (22.1)	77.9 (25.5)	76.2 (24.6)	68.9 (20.5)	55.8 (13.2)	43.8 (6.6)	35.7 (2.1)	54.5 (12.5)
Daily mean °F (°C)	25.6 (−3.6)	25.4 (−3.7)	32.1 (0.1)	37.0 (2.8)	45.9 (7.7)	56.0 (13.3)	62.7 (17.1)	61.1 (16.2)	53.7 (12.1)	42.5 (5.8)	32.6 (0.3)	25.3 (−3.7)	41.7 (5.4)
Mean daily minimum °F (°C)	15.4 (−9.2)	14.5 (−9.7)	20.4 (−6.4)	24.8 (−4.0)	32.4 (0.2)	40.3 (4.6)	47.5 (8.6)	46.1 (7.8)	38.4 (3.6)	29.2 (−1.6)	21.4 (−5.9)	14.8 (−9.6)	28.8 (−1.8)
Mean minimum °F (°C)	−6.7 (−21.5)	−8.3 (−22.4)	1.8 (−16.8)	10.3 (−12.1)	19.7 (−6.8)	32.0 (0.0)	38.8 (3.8)	37.6 (3.1)	27.3 (−2.6)	13.5 (−10.3)	3.7 (−15.7)	−7.0 (−21.7)	−14.7 (−25.9)
Record low °F (°C)	−19 (−28)	−26 (−32)	−27 (−33)	−5 (−21)	7 (−14)	26 (−3)	33 (1)	34 (1)	19 (−7)	−10 (−23)	−18 (−28)	−25 (−32)	−27 (−33)
Average precipitation inches (mm)	0.47 (12)	0.50 (13)	0.91 (23)	1.52 (39)	1.72 (44)	1.39 (35)	1.63 (41)	1.43 (36)	1.36 (35)	1.05 (27)	0.69 (18)	0.50 (13)	13.17 (336)
Average snowfall inches (cm)	6.4 (16)	7.9 (20)	13.0 (33)	15.7 (40)	5.5 (14)	0.0 (0.0)	0.0 (0.0)	0.0 (0.0)	1.7 (4.3)	6.7 (17)	8.2 (21)	8.1 (21)	73.2 (186.3)
Average precipitation days (≥ 0.01 in)	4.3	5.4	5.7	8.1	9.7	7.2	9.9	9.9	7.9	6.3	5.1	5.4	84.9
Average snowy days (≥ 0.1 in)	3.5	4.4	4.5	5.1	1.3	0.0	0.0	0.0	0.5	2.1	3.9	4.5	29.8
Source 1: NOAA
Source 2: National Weather Service (mean maxima and minima 2006–2020)
