= Glen Echo, Colorado =

Unincorporated community in Larimer County, CO, USA

- Unincorporated community
- Location within Colorado Location within the United States
- Coordinates: 40°41′55″N 105°35′07″W
- Country: United States
- State: Colorado
- County: Larimer
- Elevation: 7,162 ft (2,183 m)
- Time zone: UTC-7 (Mountain (MST))
  - Summer (DST): UTC-6 (MDT)
- Area code: 970
- GNIS feature ID: 177129

Glen Echo is an unincorporated community in Larimer County, Colorado, United States. Glen Echo is located on State Highway 14 and the Cache La Poudre River 27.5 miles (44.3 km) west-northwest of Fort Collins. The community borders Rustic to the east.
