= Laporte, Colorado =

Census-designated place in Larimer County, CO, USA

- Census-designated place
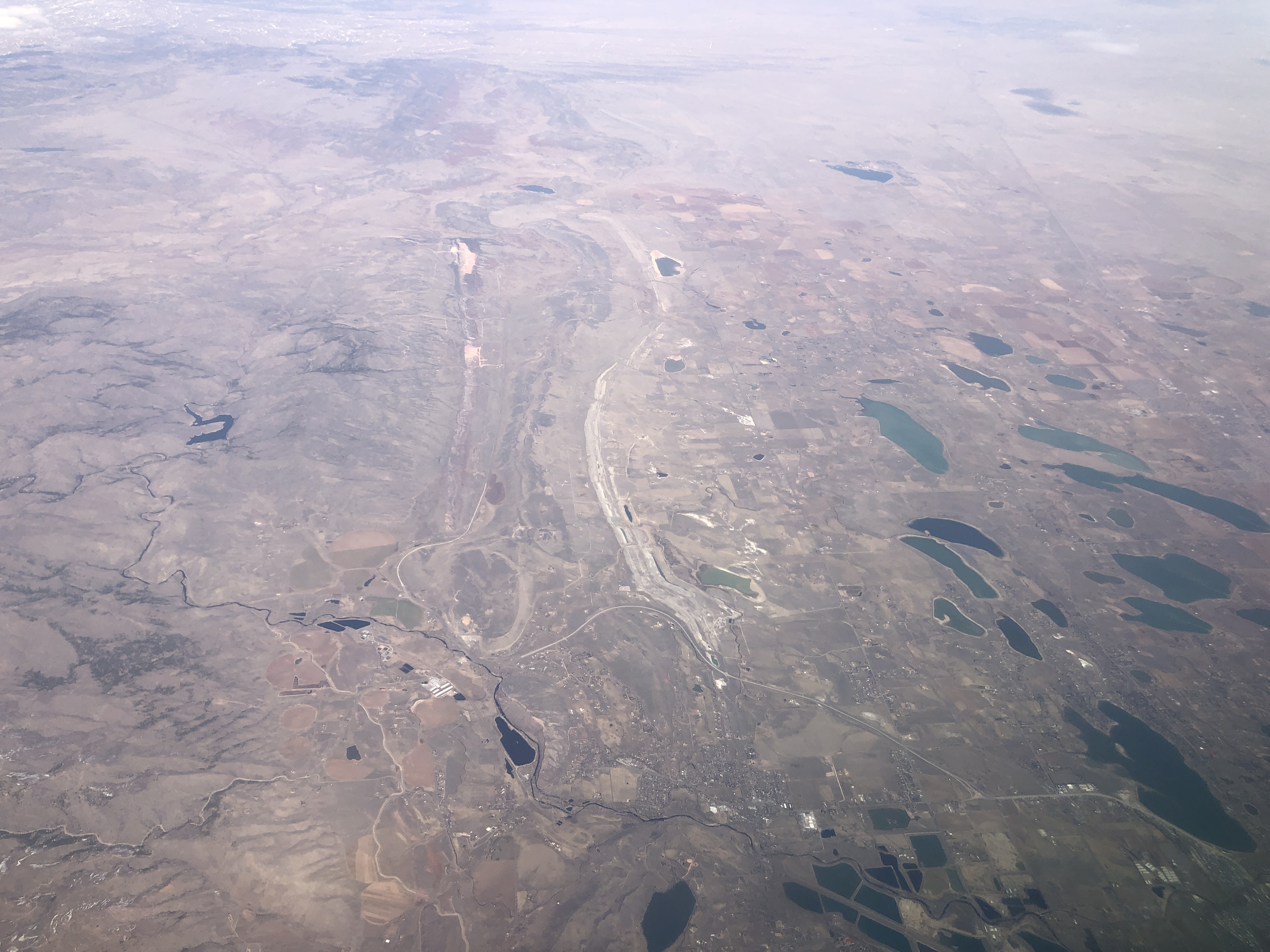
- Aerial view of Larimer County, with the town of Laporte in the foreground

- Location of the Laporte CDP in Larimer County, Colorado
- Coordinates: 40°37′42″N 105°07′45″W
- Country: United States
- State: Colorado
- County: Larimer County
- Settled: 1844

Government
  - Type: unincorporated town

Area
  - Total: 6.224 sq mi (16.120 km^{2})
  - Land: 6.116 sq mi (15.841 km^{2})
  - Water: 0.108 sq mi (0.279 km^{2})
- Elevation: 5,109 ft (1,557 m)

Population (2020)
  - Total: 2,409
  - Density: 393.9/sq mi (152.1/km^{2})
- Time zone: UTC-7 (MST)
  - Summer (DST): UTC-6 (MDT)
- ZIP Code: 80535
- Area code: 970
- GNIS feature ID: 2408572

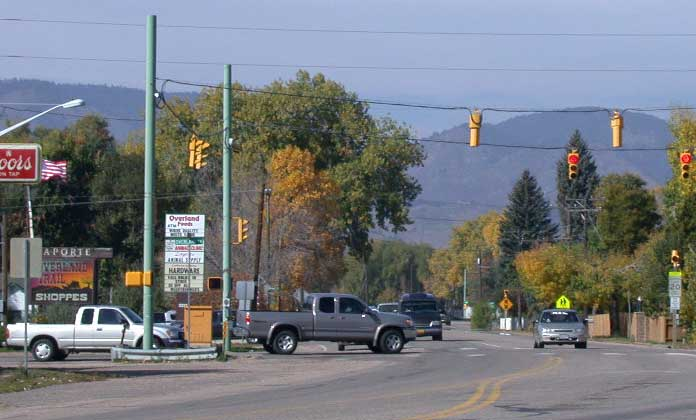
Laporte, looking west along U.S. Route 287

Laporte (originally spelled La Porte and alternatively spelled LaPorte) is an unincorporated town, a post office, and a census-designated place (CDP) located in and governed by Larimer County, Colorado, United States. The CDP is a part of the Fort Collins, CO Metropolitan Statistical Area. The Laporte post office has the ZIP Code 80535. At the United States Census 2020, the population of the Laporte CDP was 2,409.

== History ==
The town was first settled by French-Canadian fur trappers and mountain men. It was the gateway to all the mountainous region lying north of the South Platte River and extending from the Plains to the Continental Divide. The trappers built cabins here along the Cache la Poudre River as early as 1828, making it the first settlement in Larimer County. According to legend, a group of fur traders had earlier stashed supplies (including gunpowder) in a cache along the river near Laporte, and that is how the river got its name. It became the home of Antoine Janis in 1844, who is often noted as the first permanent settler north of the Arkansas River. A band of mountaineers, hunters and trappers made Laporte their headquarters for fur catching and trading operations. The settlement increased in numbers, including 150 lodges of Arapaho Indians who settled peacefully along the river and in the valley. The town was named by the fur trappers, many with Native American wives, who settled in the area in the mid-19th century. The name la porte means "the door" in French.

The winter of 1849 brought Kit Carson and his company of trappers to the Cache la Poudre, where they set up camp. In 1860 a town company was organized, originally called "Colona". Between fifty and sixty log dwellings were erected that year along the banks of the Cache la Poudre River in the valley, and in November 1861 the territorial legislature designated Laporte as the county seat. In 1862, the town of Colona changed its name to "Laporte", and was named the headquarters of the Mountain Division of the Overland Trail Stage Route. The first post office opened, and a stage stop was built on the Overland Trail. An Overland Stage station was erected right along the river, very near where the present Overland Trail crosses the river. Mrs. Taylor, wife of the first stationmaster, was a "good cook" and "gracious hostess", and as described by one diarist, knows "what to do with beans and dried apples." The stage fare from Denver to Laporte was $20.00. The first bridge over the Cache la Poudre River was built as a toll bridge, and during the rush to California, numerous wagons and stage coaches crossed it every day. The toll charged was anywhere from $.50 to $8.00, depending on what source of information is used. In 1864, the bridge was washed away by a flood, and a ferry was rigged up and used for several years until the county built another bridge.

Laporte soon became a bustling business and supply center for emigrants, with wagon trains and stagecoaches constantly passing through. There were four saloons, a brewery, a butcher shop, two blacksmith shops, a general store and a hotel. The store was a thriving business, sometimes making as much as $1,000 per day. Laporte was the most important settlement north of Denver, housing the stage station, the county court house, the military, Indians, and trappers. In 1862, Camp Collins was established by the U.S. Army along the river to protect the stage line from attack by Native Americans. Also that same year, the Laporte Townsite Company claimed 1,280 acres (5.2 km^{2}) of land for the town. In 1863 the 13th Kansas volunteer infantry was stationed to Laporte, acting as escort for the Overland Stage on the trail to Virginia Dale. During the flood of 1864, the army camp was covered with water, and the soldiers had to suddenly flee to higher ground. In August of that year, Col. Collins came down from Laramie, Wyoming, on an inspection tour, and decided to move the army camp to Fort Collins, downriver about 6 miles (10 km).

== Geography ==
Laporte is located on the Cache la Poudre River northwest of Fort Collins, close to where the river emerges from the foothills of the Rocky Mountains. U.S. Route 287 runs along the northern edge of the community, leading southeast 6 miles (10 km) to Fort Collins and northwest 58 miles (93 km) to Laramie, Wyoming.

The Laporte CDP has an area of 3,983 acres (16.120 km^{2}), including 69 acres (0.279 km^{2}) of water.

== Demographics ==
The United States Census Bureau initially defined the Laporte CDP for the United States Census 2000.

Laporte CDP, Colorado
Year	Pop.	±%
2000	2,691	—
2010	2,450	−9.0%
2020	2,409	−1.7%
Source: United States Census Bureau

=== 2020 census ===
As of the 2020 census, Laporte had a population of 2,409. The median age was 44.2 years. 16.9% of residents were under the age of 18 and 21.0% of residents were 65 years of age or older. For every 100 females there were 99.4 males, and for every 100 females age 18 and over there were 99.9 males age 18 and over.

66.7% of residents lived in urban areas, while 33.3% lived in rural areas.

There were 1,062 households in Laporte, of which 24.3% had children under the age of 18 living in them. Of all households, 47.6% were married-couple households, 21.2% were households with a male householder and no spouse or partner present, and 23.9% were households with a female householder and no spouse or partner present. About 28.5% of all households were made up of individuals and 10.4% had someone living alone who was 65 years of age or older.

There were 1,123 housing units, of which 5.4% were vacant. The homeowner vacancy rate was 1.5% and the rental vacancy rate was 2.6%.

Racial composition as of the 2020 census
Race	Number	Percent
White	2,034	84.4%
Black or African American	5	0.2%
American Indian and Alaska Native	24	1.0%
Asian	19	0.8%
Native Hawaiian and Other Pacific Islander	3	0.1%
Some other race	73	3.0%
Two or more races	251	10.4%
Hispanic or Latino (of any race)	244	10.1%

== See also ==
- National Register of Historic Places listings in Larimer County, Colorado
- Front Range Urban Corridor
- North Central Colorado Urban Area
- Fort Collins-Loveland, CO Metropolitan Statistical Area
