= Gulnare, Colorado =

Unincorporated community in Las Animas County, CO, USA

Gulnare, Colorado Abeyton
- Unincorporated community
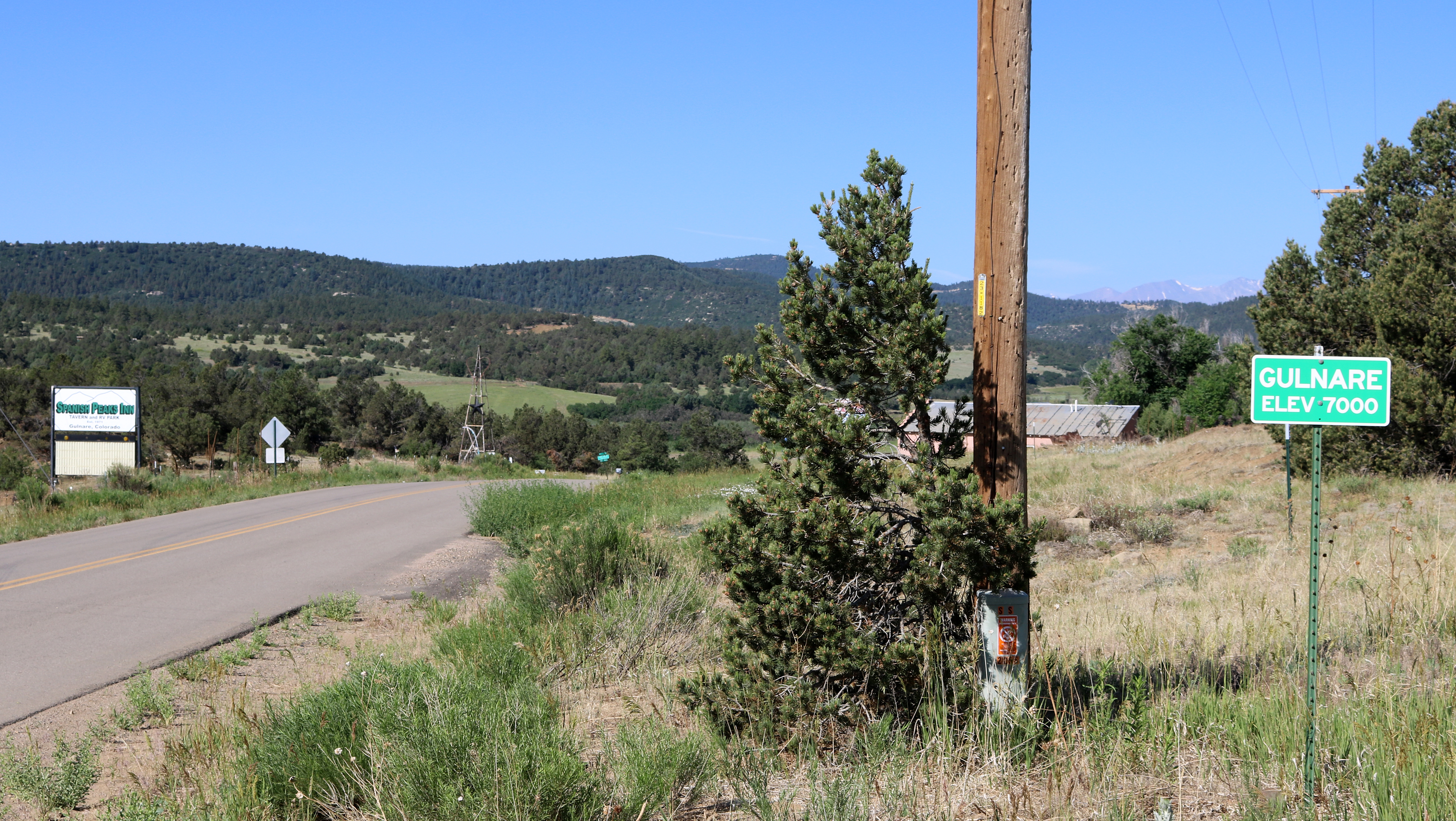
- Looking west in Gulnare

- Location of Gulnare, Colorado. Gulnare (Colorado)
- Coordinates: 37°19′00″N 104°45′03″W
- Country: United States
- State: Colorado
- County: Las Animas
- Elevation: 6,982 ft (2,128 m)
- Time zone: UTC-7 (MST)
  - Summer (DST): UTC-6 (MDT)
- GNIS ID: 204808

Gulnare (pronounced GUL ner) is an unincorporated community in Las Animas County, Colorado, United States.

== Geography ==
Gulnare lies southwest of Aguilar and southeast of the Spanish Peaks in the Apishapa River Valley. It is known for The Spanish Peaks Inn, a popular tavern and adjoining RV park.

== Name ==
Originally known as Abeyton, the Abeyton post office operated from March 7, 1884, until August 20, 1890. Residents were promised a new post office, so they sent prospective names in an envelope to the post office's Washington headquarters, but all the names were rejected. The envelope had a drawing of a cow called "Princess of Gulnare".

== See also ==
- List of populated places in Colorado
