= List of trading posts in Colorado =

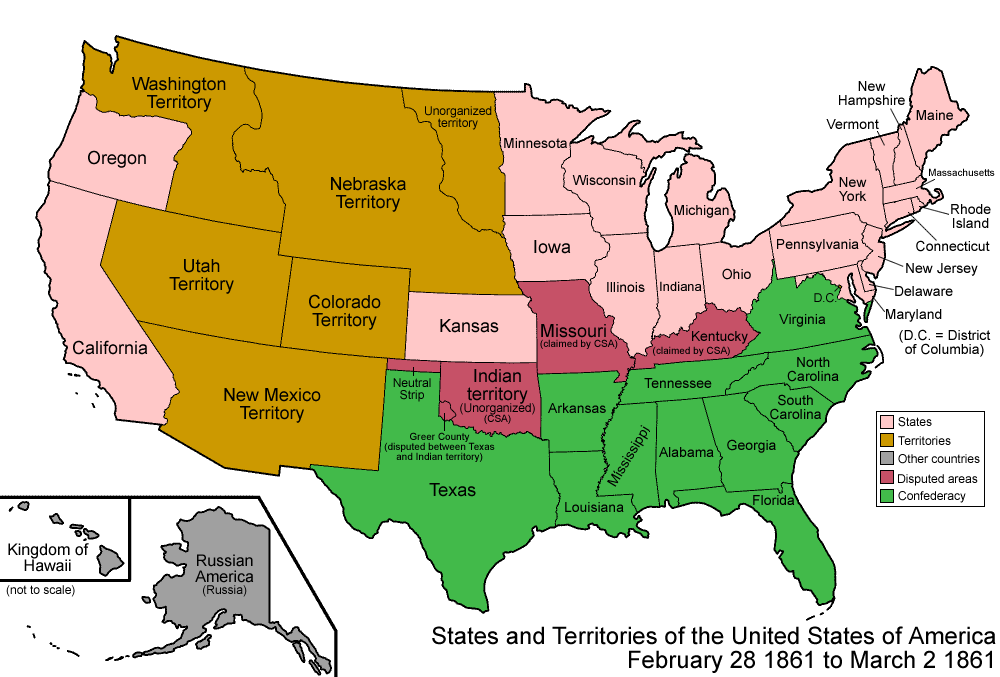
A map of the United States when the Territory of Colorado was created on February 28, 1861.

The 64 counties of the U.S. State of Colorado

This is a partial list of trading posts established in what is now the U.S. State of Colorado from 1828 to approximately 1868. The 24 historic trading posts in Colorado traded goods produced outside the region to Native Americans for furs, food, and locally made goods. Trading posts also sold goods to travellers and settlers.

== Table ==
This is a sortable table of some of the historic trading posts in Colorado. Select the OpenStreetMap link in the box at right to view a map showing the location these trading posts.

Historic Trading Posts in Colorado
Trading post	Other names	Current county	Location	Elevation	Established	Abandoned	Status
Fort Uncompahgre	Fort Robidoux	Delta (Note: Fort Uncompahgre operated in the northwestern region of Santa Fe de Nuevo México.)	38.7503°N 108.0737°W (Note: This is the location of the reproduction of the trading post.)	4,928 ft 1502 m	1828	1844	Reconstruction
Gantt's Picket Post	Fort Gantt	Bent (Note: Gantt's Picket Post operated in the unorganized territory of the United States.)			1832	1834	No remains
Bent's Fort	Bent's Old Fort, Fort William, Bent's Picket Post	Otero (Note: Bent's Fort operated in the unorganized territory of the United States.)	38.0406°N 103.4294°W	4,005 ft 1221 m	1833	1849	National Historic Site.
Jimmy's Camp	Jimmy Camp	El Paso (Note: Jimmy's Camp operated in the unorganized territory of the United States until May 30, 1854, when the area was incorporated in the new Territory of Kansas. On January 29, 1861, the area reverted to the unorganized territory of the United States, but 30 days later the area was incorporated in the new Territory of Colorado.)			1833	1868	Nothing remains.
Fort Cass		Pueblo (Note: Fort Cass operated in the unorganized territory of the United States.)			1834	1835	No remains
Fort Convenience		Adams (Note: Fort Convenience operated in the unorganized territory of the United States.)			1834	1835	No remains
Fort Le Duc	Fort Maurice, Buzzard's Roost, El Cuervo	Custer (Note: Fort Le Duc operated in the unorganized territory of the United States until May 30, 1854, when the area was incorporated in the new Territory of Kansas.)			1830s	1854	No remains
Fort Vasquez		Weld (Note: Fort Vasquez operated in the unorganized territory of the United States.)	40.1944°N 104.8211°W	4,826 ft 1471 m	1835	1842	Restored and museum
Fort Saint Vrain	Fort George, Fort Lookout	Weld (Note: Fort Saint Vrain operated in the unorganized territory of the United States until May 30, 1854, when the area was incorporated in the new Territory of Nebraska.)	40.27889°N 104.8550°W	4,764 ft 1452 m	1837	1855	Historical marker
Fort Lupton	Fort Lawrence	Weld (Note: Fort Lupton operated in the unorganized territory of the United States.)			1837	1844	Reconstructed
Fort Jackson		Weld (Note: Fort Jackson operated in the unorganized territory of the United States.)			1837	1838	Foundation remains
Fort Gerry		Weld (Note: Fort Gerry operated in the unorganized territory of the United States.)			late 1830s	1840s	
Milk Fort	Fort Leche, Pueblo de Leche, Fort El Puebla, Peebles Fort, Fort Independence	Otero (Note: Milk Fort operated in the unorganized territory of the United States.)			late 1830s		No remains
Fort Davy Crockett	Fort Misery	Moffat (Note: Fort Davy Crockett operated without authorization in the northwestern region of Santa Fe de Nuevo México.)	40.7862°N 108.8944°W (Note: This is an approximate location of the trading post.)	5,374 ft 1638 m	late 1830s		
Fraeb's Post	Fort Fraeb	Routt (Note: Fraeb's Post operated without authorization in the northwestern region of Santa Fe de Nuevo México.)			1840	1841	No remains
El Pueblo	Fort Pueblo	Pueblo (Note: El Pueblo operated in the unorganized territory of the United States until May 30, 1854, when the area was incorporated in the new Territory of Kansas.)			1842	1854	No remains
Bent's New Fort		Bent (Note: Bent's New Fort operated in the unorganized territory of the United States until May 30, 1854, when the area was incorporated in the new Territory of Kansas.)	38.0922°N 103.1522°W	3,888 ft 1185 m	1853	1860	Foundation remains
Fort Namaqua	Modena's Crossing, Namaqua Station, Mariano's Crossing, Big Thompson, Miraville	Larimer (Note: Fort Namaqua operated in Territory of Nebraska until February 28, 1861, when the area was incorporated in the new Territory of Colorado.)			1858 or 1859	1868	Historical marker at Namaqua Park
Fort Julesburg		Sedgwick (Note: Fort Julesburg operated in Territory of Nebraska until February 28, 1861, when the area was incorporated in the new Territory of Colorado.)	40.9430°N 102.3582°W	3,514 ft 1071 m	1860	1861	

== Gallery ==
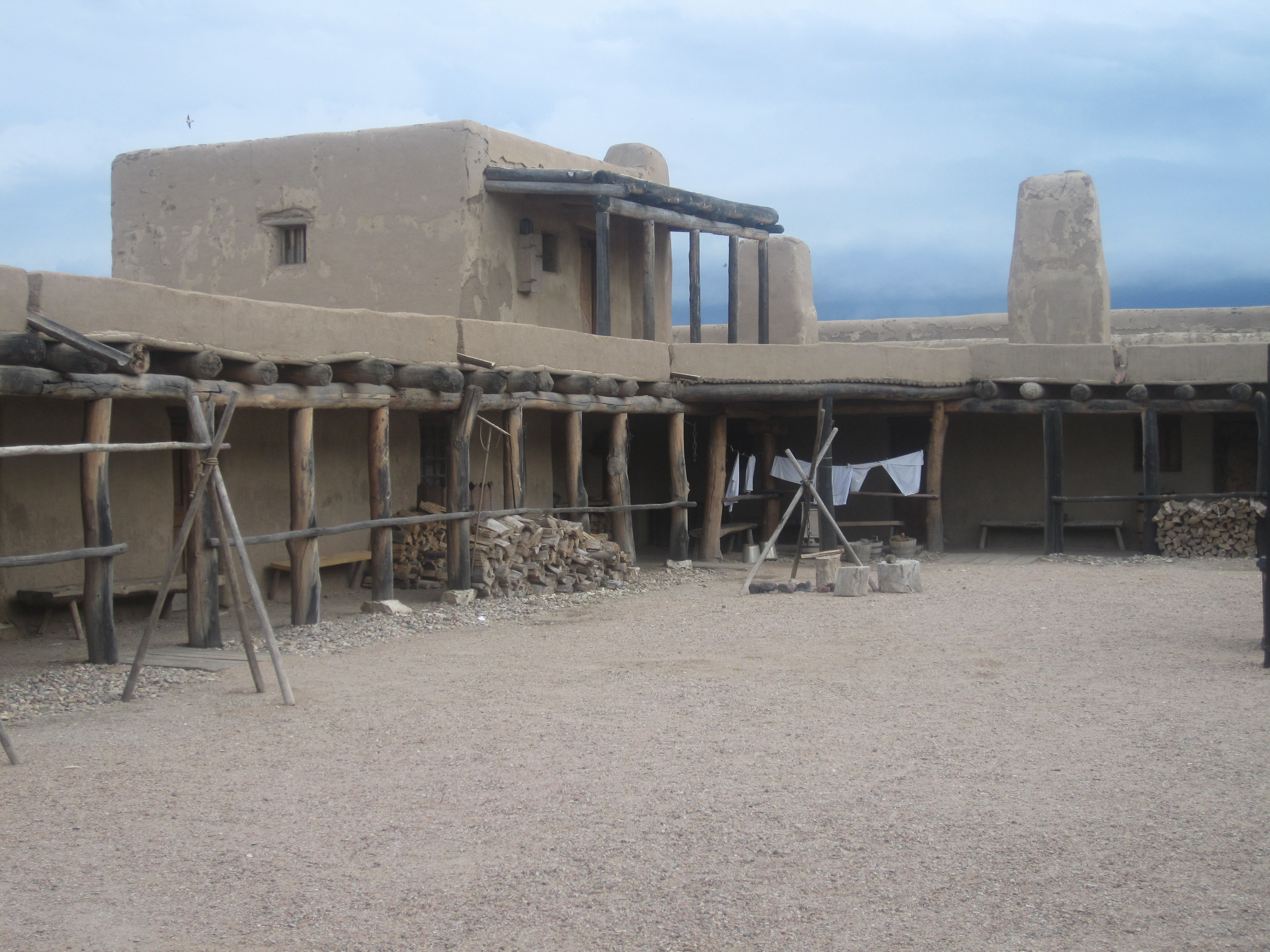
Reconstruction of Bent's Old Fort.

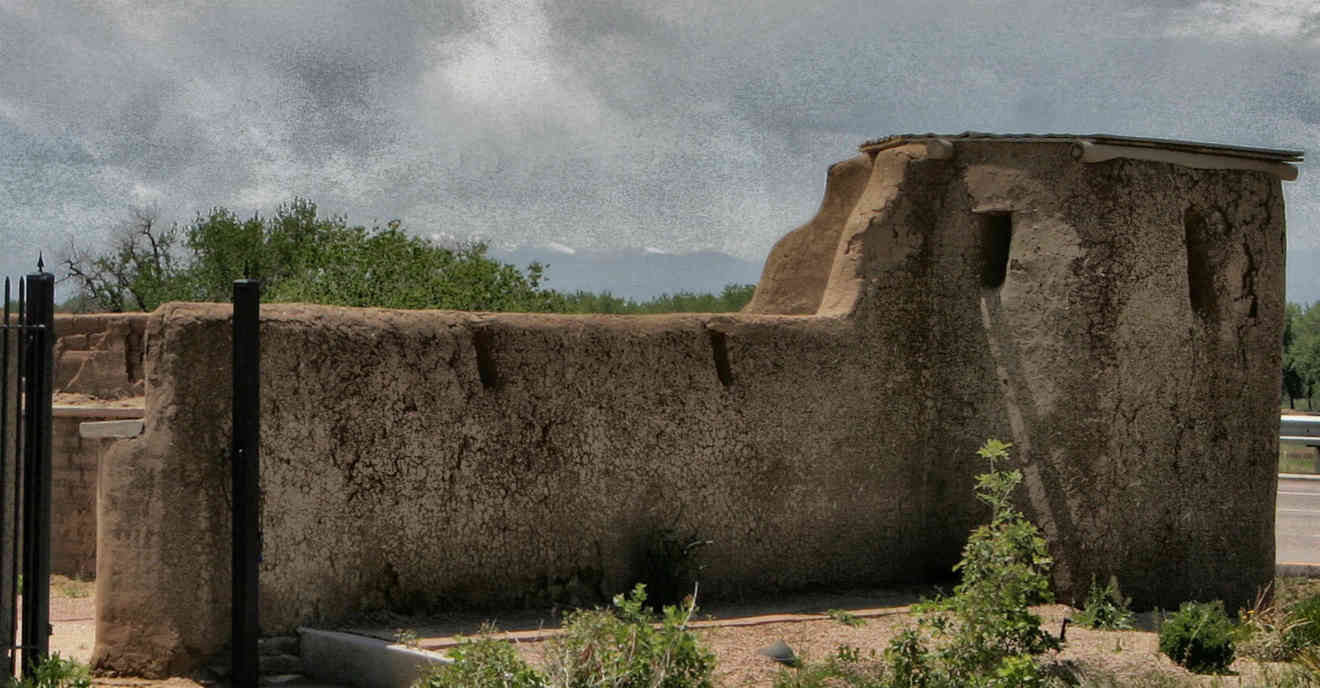
Reconstruction of Fort Vasquez.

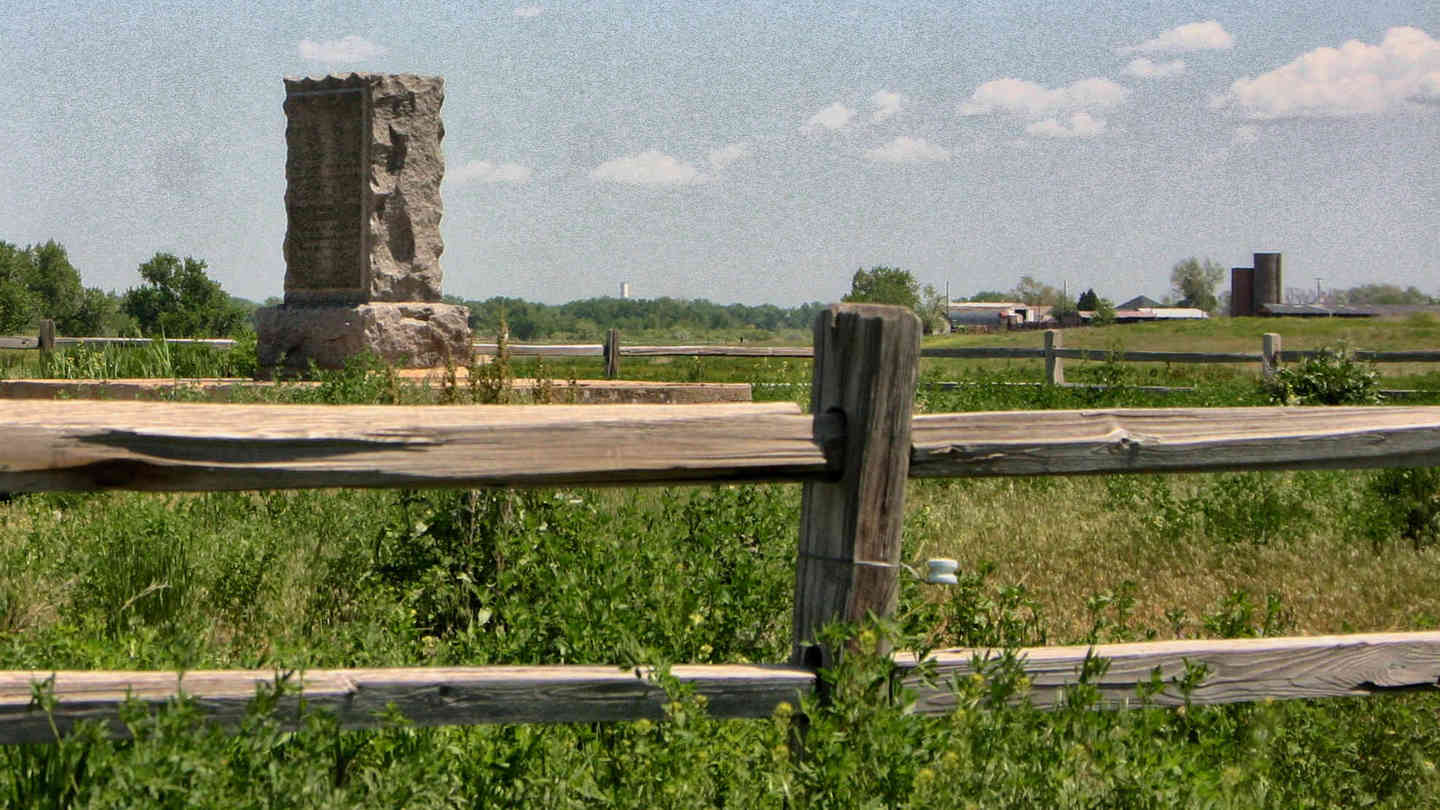
Marker at site of Fort Saint Vrain.

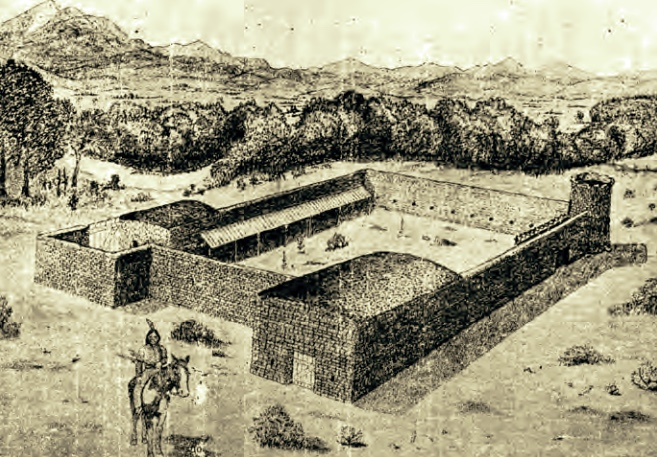
Sketch of Fort Lupton.

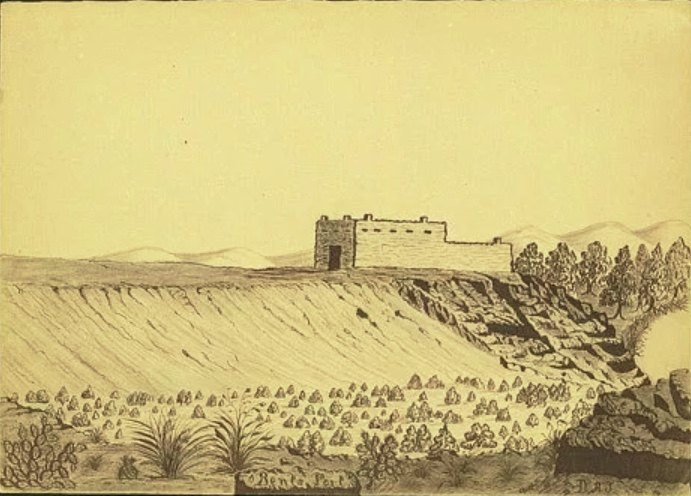
Sketch of Bent's New Fort.

== Maps ==
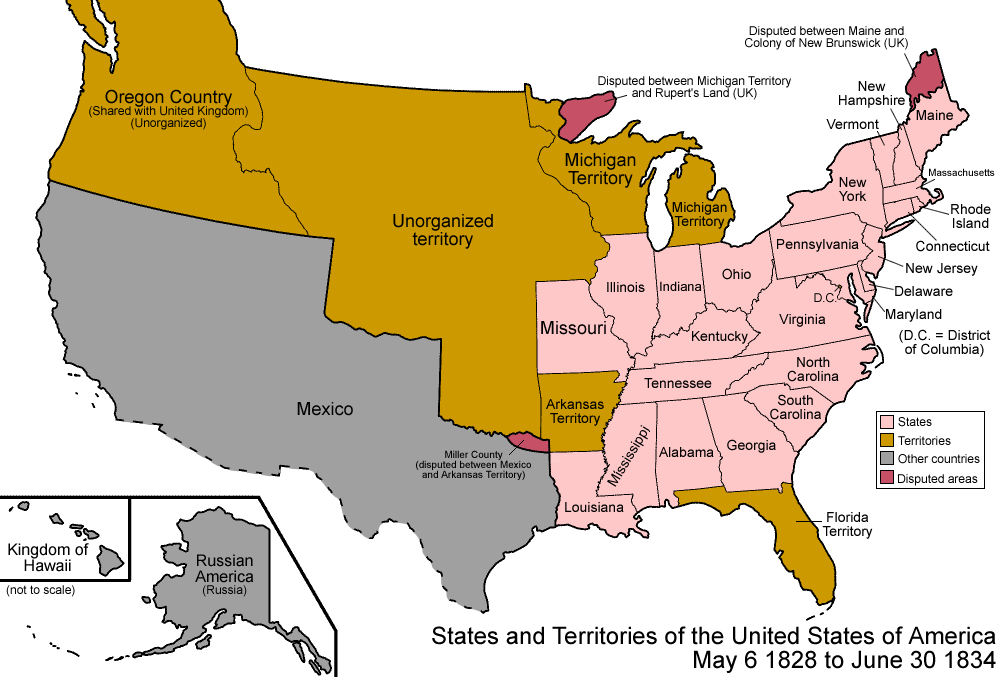
A map of the United States from 1828 to 1834.

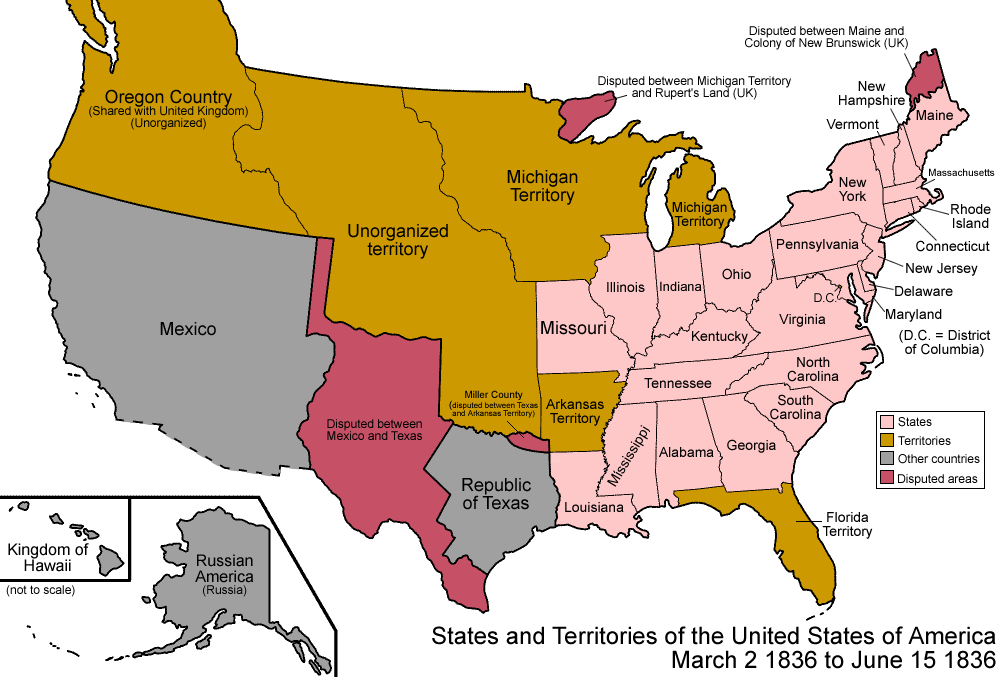
A map of the United States in 1836.

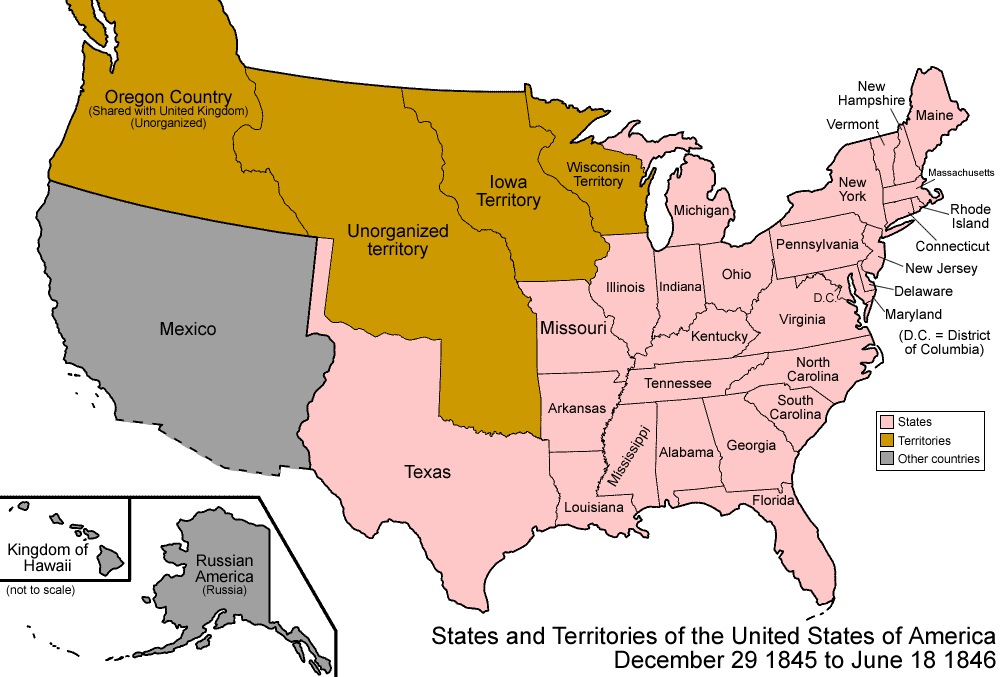
A map of the United States from 1845 to 1846.

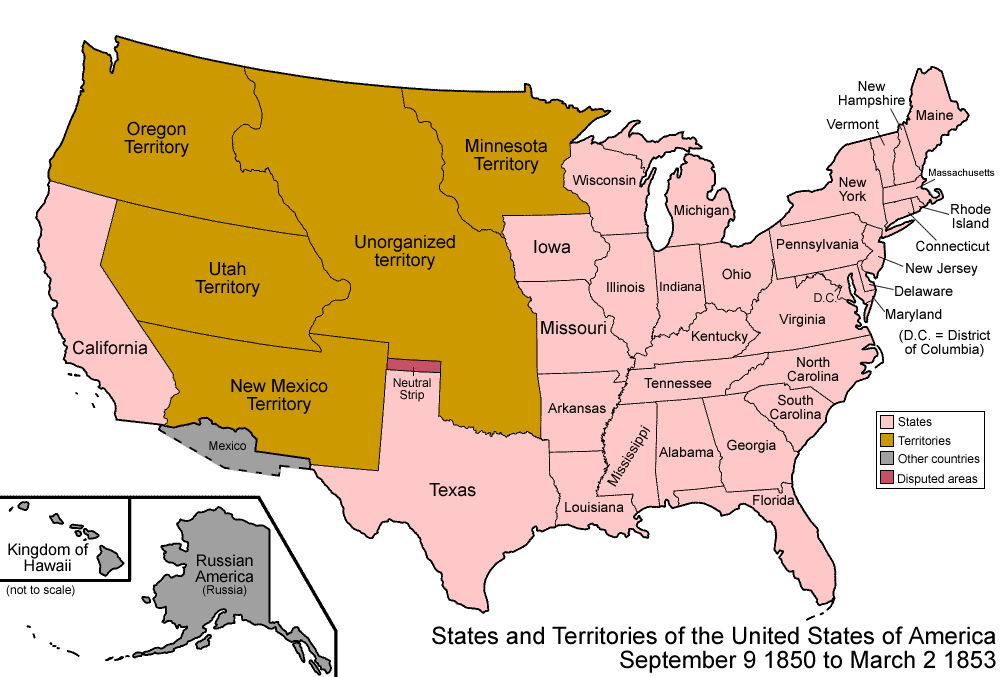
A map of the United States from 1850 to 1853.

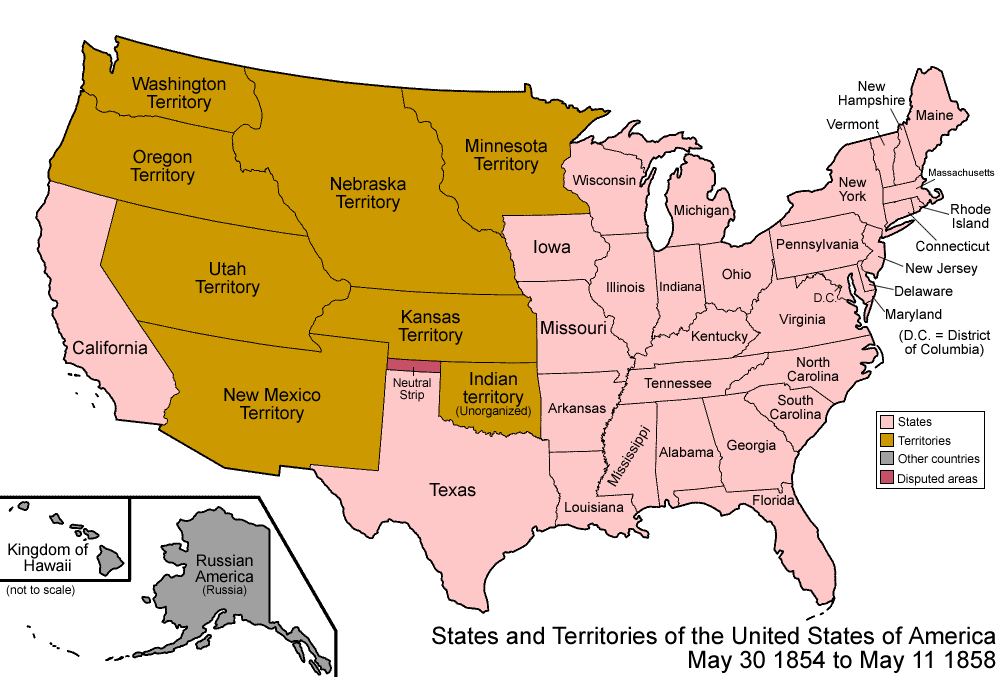
A map of the United States from 1854 to 1858.

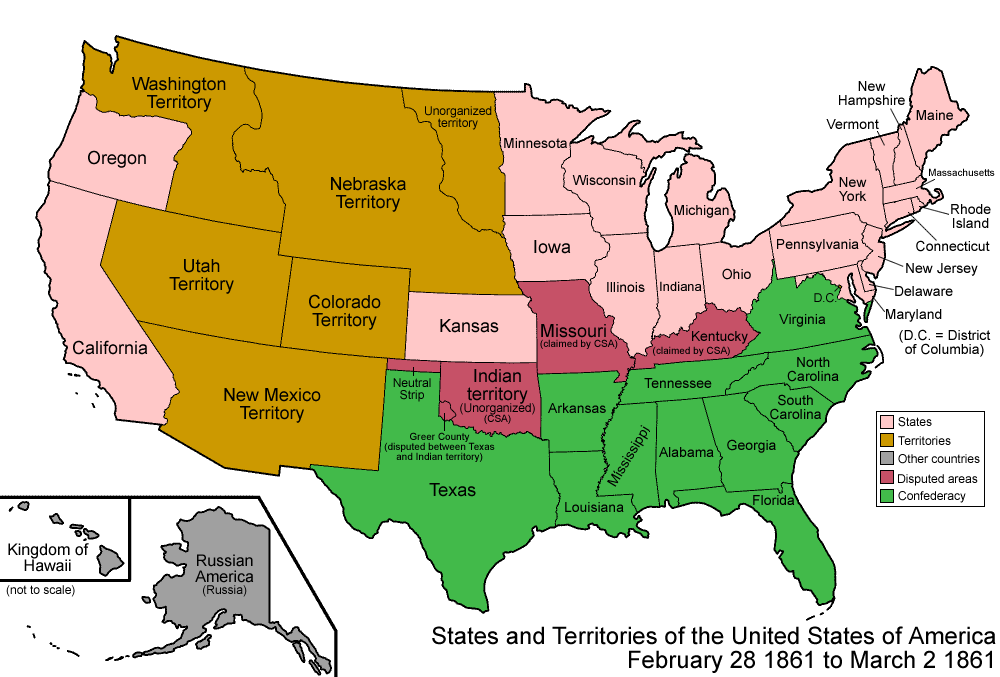
A map of the United States in 1861.

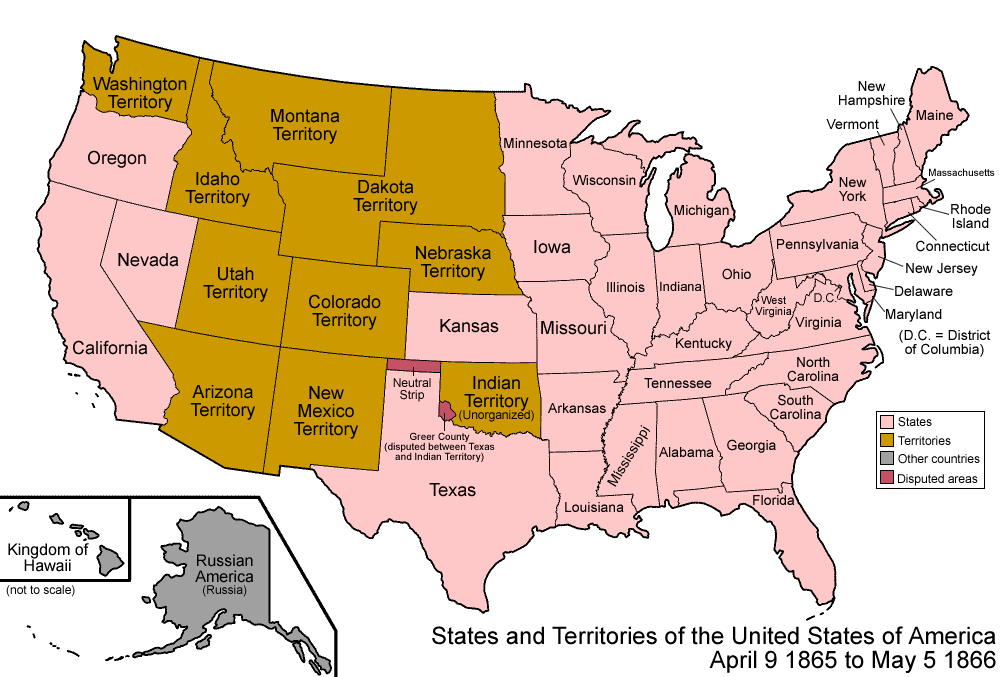
A map of the United States from 1865 to 1866.

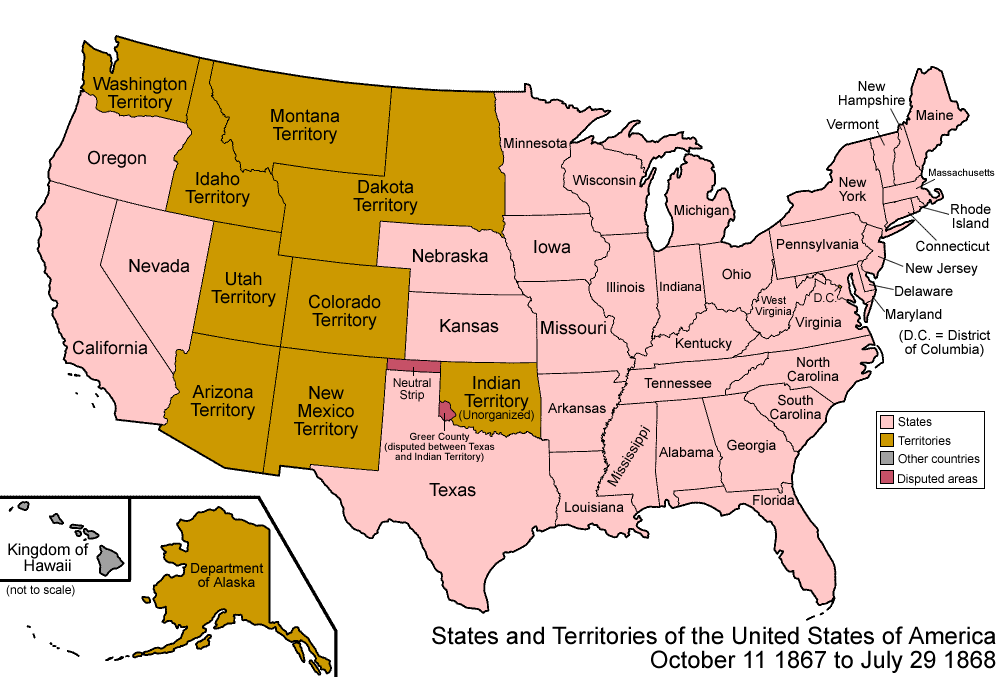
A map of the United States from 1867 to 1868.

== See also ==
- Bibliography of Colorado
- Geography of Colorado
- History of Colorado
- Index of Colorado-related articles
- List of Colorado-related lists
  - List of forts in Colorado
  - List of ghost towns in Colorado
- Outline of Colorado
