= List of forts in Colorado =

Coordinates: 38.9972°N 105.5478°W

External image
- Map of private and military forts in Colorado from 1807 to 1900

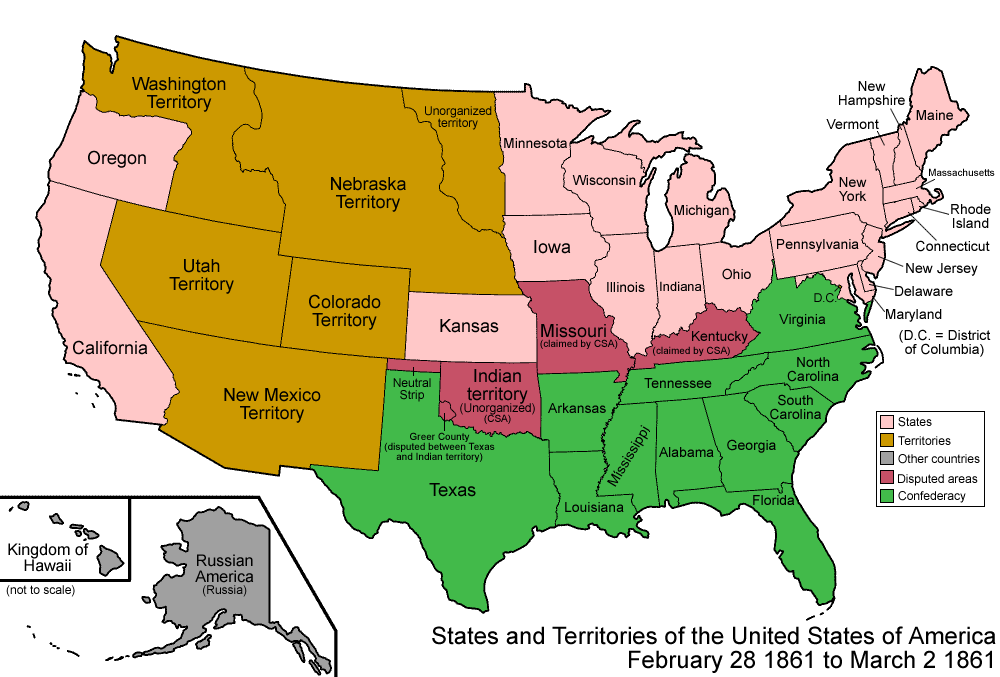
A map of the United States when the Territory of Colorado was created on February 28, 1861.

The 64 counties of the U.S. State of Colorado.

This is a list of military and trading forts established in what is now the U.S. State of Colorado.

== History ==
The initial forts, built in the first half of the 19th century, were early communities of commerce between Native Americans, trappers, and traders. William Butler, who wrote about the fur trade in Colorado, stated that there were 24 trading posts built in the pre-territorial area of what is now Colorado. The trading posts were of varying sizes. Gantt's Post had several small wooden buildings located along Fountain Creek. Near Pueblo, Fort Le Duc (Buzzard's Roost) was a small settlement. Bent's Old Fort was a large adobe stockade on the Arkansas River. Multiple trading posts were built along a 13-mile stretch of the South Platte River in the late 1830s: Fort Jackson, Fort Lupton, and Fort Vasquez. In the early 1840s, the fur trade collapsed and most of the trading posts were closed, although some served early communities of miners and farmers. Bent's Old Fort continued to operate as it was located on the Santa Fe Trail, serving people from the United States and the New Spain areas of what is now New Mexico.

== Table of Colorado forts ==
Name	Other names	Location	Current county	Year founded	Year abandoned	Type	Status
Pike's Stockade		Sanford	Conejos	1807	1807	U.S. Army stockade	Reproduction
Spanish Fort	Fort Sangre de Cristo	Sangre de Cristo Pass	Costilla	1819	1821	Spanish Army fort	
Fort Talpa		Farisita	Huerfano	1820s		Spanish post	
Fort Uncompahgre	Fort Robidoux	Delta area	Delta	1820s	1844	Trading post	Reconstruction
Gantt's Picket Post	Fort Gantt	Las Animas	Bent	1832	1834	Trading post	No remains
Fort Cass		Pueblo area	Pueblo	1834	1835	Trading post	No remains
Fort Convenience		Welby area	Adams	1834	1835	Trading post	No remains
Bent's Old Fort	Fort William (Note: Between 1830 and 1834, William Bent operated Fort William near what is now Pueblo. It was also called Bent's Picket Post.)	La Junta area	Otero	1834	1849	Trading post	National Historic Site and museum
Fort Le Duc	Fort Maurice, Buzzard's Roost, El Cuervo	Wetmore area	Custer	1830s	1854	Trading post	No remains
Fort Vasquez		Platteville	Weld	1835	1842	Trading post	Restored and museum
Fort Jackson		Ione area	Weld	1837	1838	Trading post	Foundation remains
Fort Lupton	Fort Lawrence	Fort Lupton	Weld	1837	1844	Trading post	Reconstructed
Fort Saint Vrain	Fort George, Fort Lookout	Platteville	Weld	1837	1855	Trading post	Historical marker
Fort Gerry		Kersey area	Weld	late 1830s	1840s	Trading post	
Milk Fort	Fort Leche, Pueblo de Leche, Fort El Puebla, Peebles Fort, Fort Independence	Las Animas	Otero	late 1830s		Trading post / settlement	No remains
Fort Davy Crockett	Fort Misery	Browns Park National Wildlife Refuge	Moffat	late 1830s		Trading post	
Fraeb's Post	Fort Fraeb	Steamboat Springs area	Routt	1840	1841	Trading post	No remains
El Pueblo	Fort Pueblo, Fort Nepesta, Fort Fisher, Fort Juana, Fort Spaulding, Robert Fisher's Fort	Pueblo	Pueblo	1842	1854	Trading Post	No remains
Fort Huerfano		Avondale	Pueblo	1845		Encampment	No remains
Mormon Battalion and The Vanguard Company of 1847, Mormon Trail	Fort Independence	Pueblo	Pueblo	1846	1847	Mormon homes	No remains
Fort Massachusetts		Fort Garland	Costilla	1852	1858	U.S. Army fort	Archaeological site
Bent's New Fort	See Fort Lyon 1	Lamar area	Bent	1853	1860	Trading post	Foundation remains
Fort Garland		Fort Garland	Costilla	1858	1883	U.S. Army fort	Reconstructed
Fort Namaqua	Modena's Crossing, Namaqua Station, Mariano's Crossing, Big Thompson, Miraville	Loveland	Larimer	1858 or 1859	1868+	Trading post	Historical marker at Namaqua Park
Fort Mary B	Fort Independence, Fort Independent, Fort Breckenridge, Fort Meribeh	Breckenridge	Summit	1859		Stockade	No remains
Fort Lyon 1	Fort Fauntleroy, Fort Wise	Lamar area	Prowers	1860	1867	U.S. Army fort	Destroyed by fire
Fort Weld		Denver	Denver	1861	1865	U.S. Army post	Historical marker at 8th/Vallejo
Camp Collins / Fort Collins		Fort Collins	Larimer	1862	1867	U.S. Army camp / fort	No remains
Francisco Fort	Fort Francisco	La Veta	Huerfano	1862	1902	Civilian fort	Refurbished, now a museum
Fort Morgan	Camp Tyler, Camp Wardwell	Fort Morgan	Morgan	1864	1868	U.S. Army post	Historical marker in city park
Fort Wicked		Merino	Logan	1864	1868	House	Historical marker at US-6/CR-26
Fort Sedgwick	Post at Julesburg, Camp Rankin, Fort Ranking	Sedgwick	Sedgwick	1864	1871	U.S. Army post	Historical marker
Fort Reynolds		Avondale	Pueblo	1867	1872	U.S. Army post	Historical marker
Fort Lyon 2		Las Animas	Bent	1867	1897	U.S. Army post	
Fort Lewis 1	Cantonment at Pagosa Springs	Pagosa Springs	Archuleta	1878	1880	U.S. Army post	Site is a city park
Fort Flagler	Camp at Animas City	Durango	La Plata	1879		Temporary stockades	
Fort Meeker	Cantonment on White River	Meeker	Rio Blanco	1879	1883	U.S. Army camp	Quarters refurbished, museum
Fort Lewis 2		Hesperus	La Plata	1880	1891	U.S. Army post	Converted to Indian boarding school
Fort Crawford	Cantonment at Uncompahgre	Montrose	Montrose	1880	1891	U.S. Army post	Historical marker
Fort Narraguinnep		Dolores area	Montezuma	1885		Rancher's fort	U.S. Forest Service sign
Fort Logan	Fort Sheridan	southwest Denver	Denver and Arapahoe	1887	1946	U.S. Army post	One building is a museum
Fort Carson	Camp Carson	immediately south of Colorado Springs	El Paso	1942	extant	U.S. Army post	

== Gallery ==
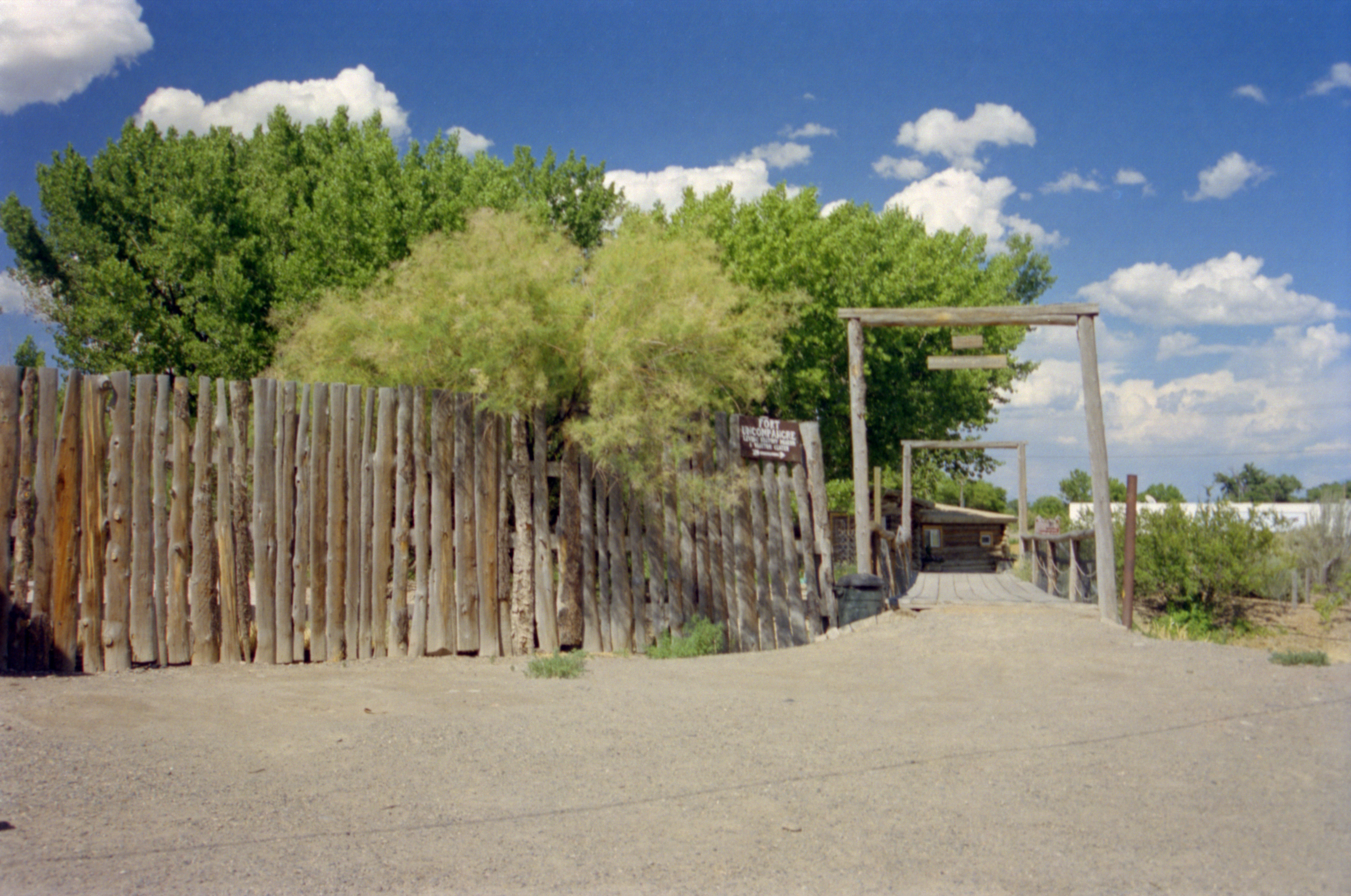
The restoration of Fort Uncompahgre.

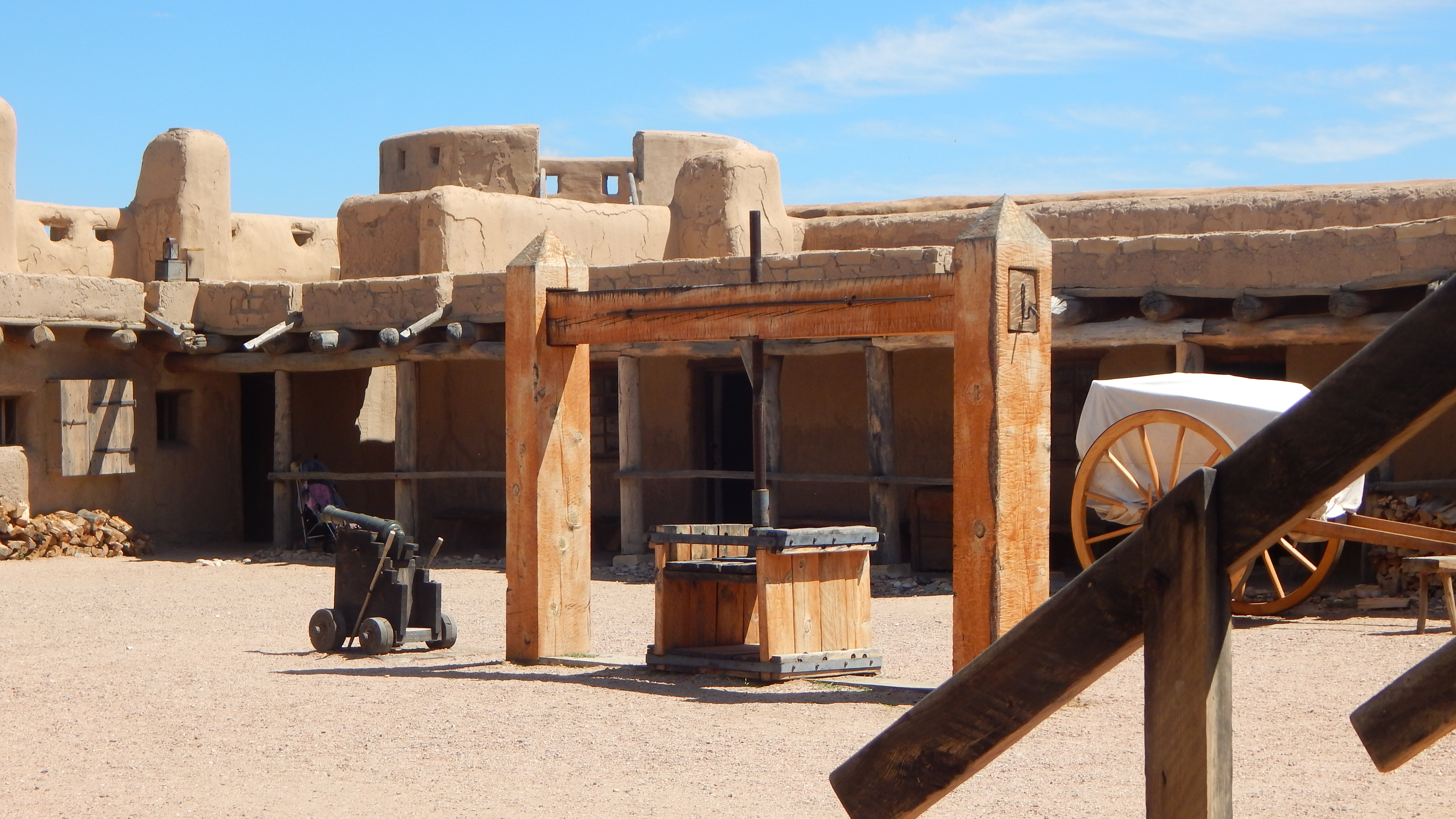
The internal courtyard of the restoration of Bent's Old Fort's.

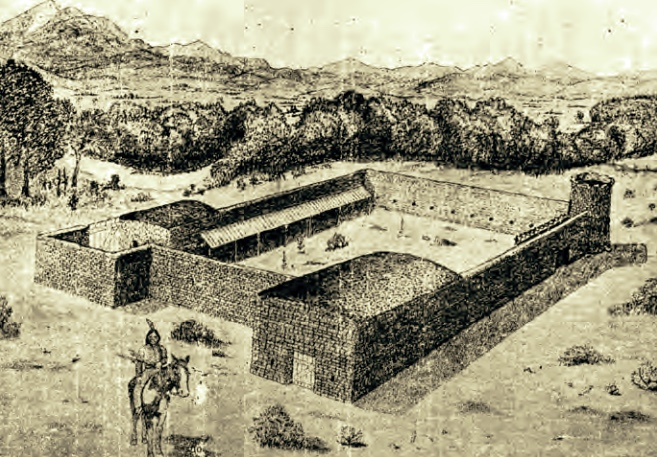
A sketch of Fort Lupton.

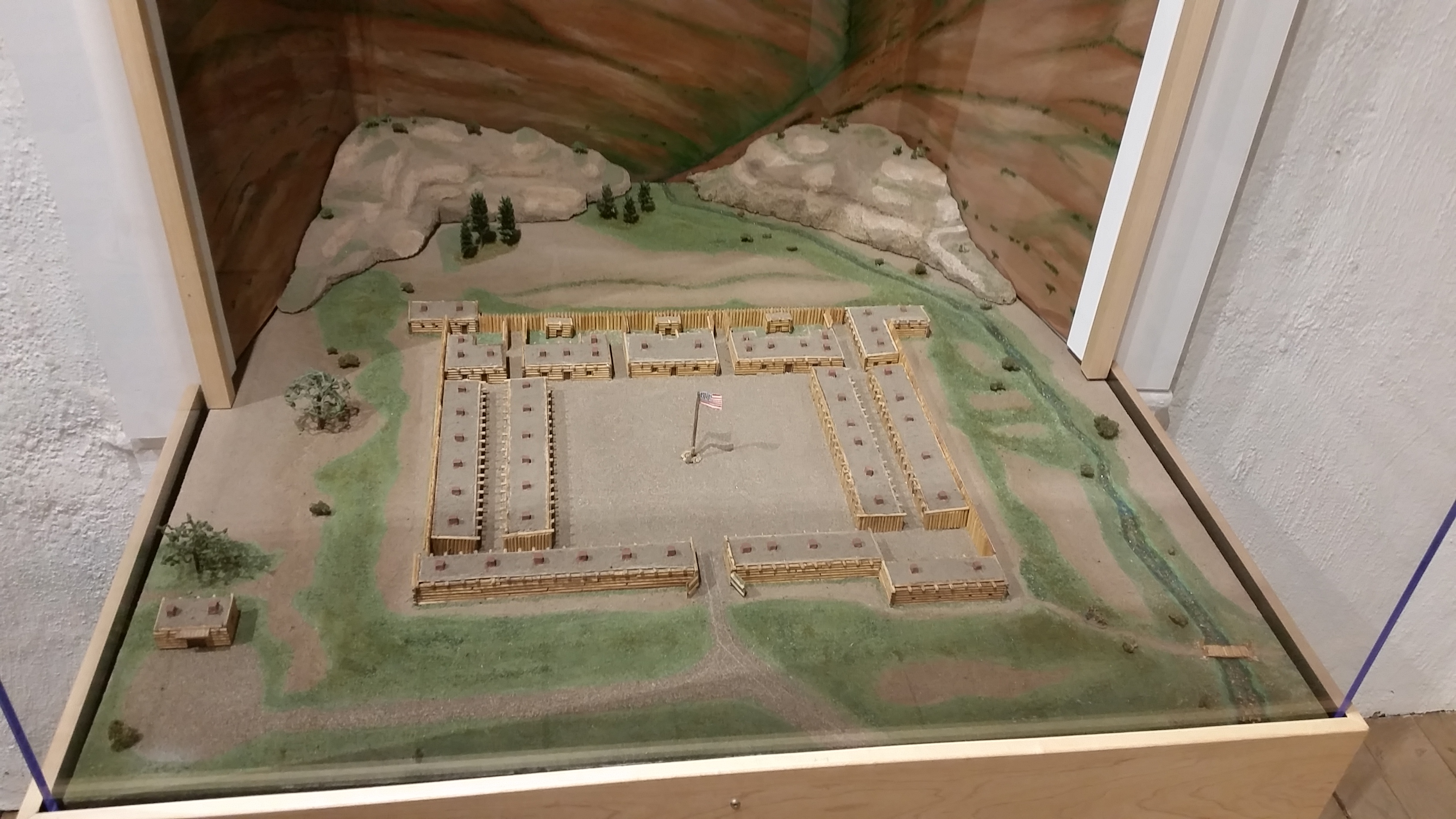
A model of Fort Massachusetts.

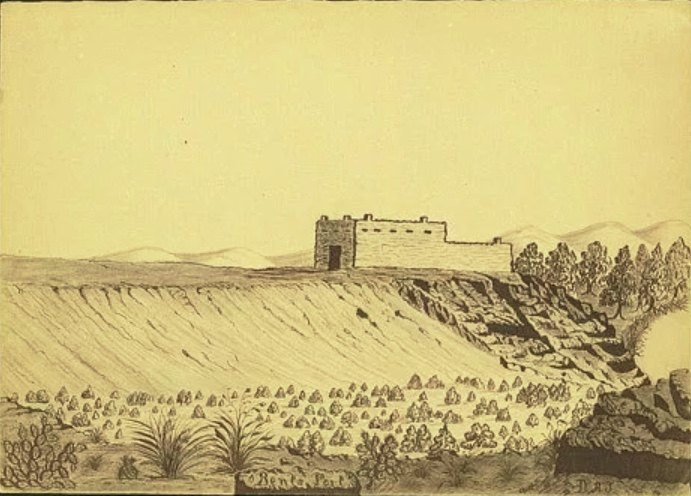
Daniel Jenks' sketch of Bent's New Fort.

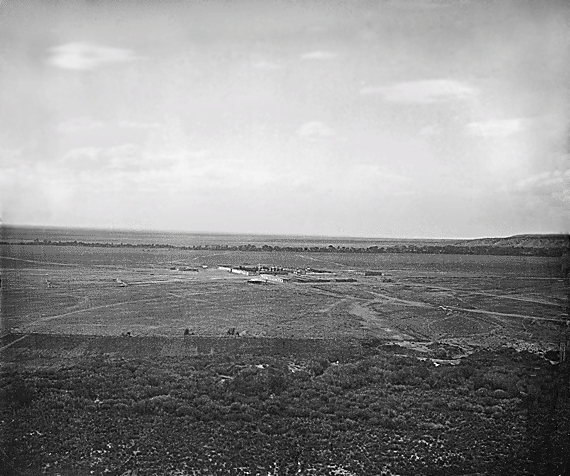
An 1874 photograph of Fort Garland.

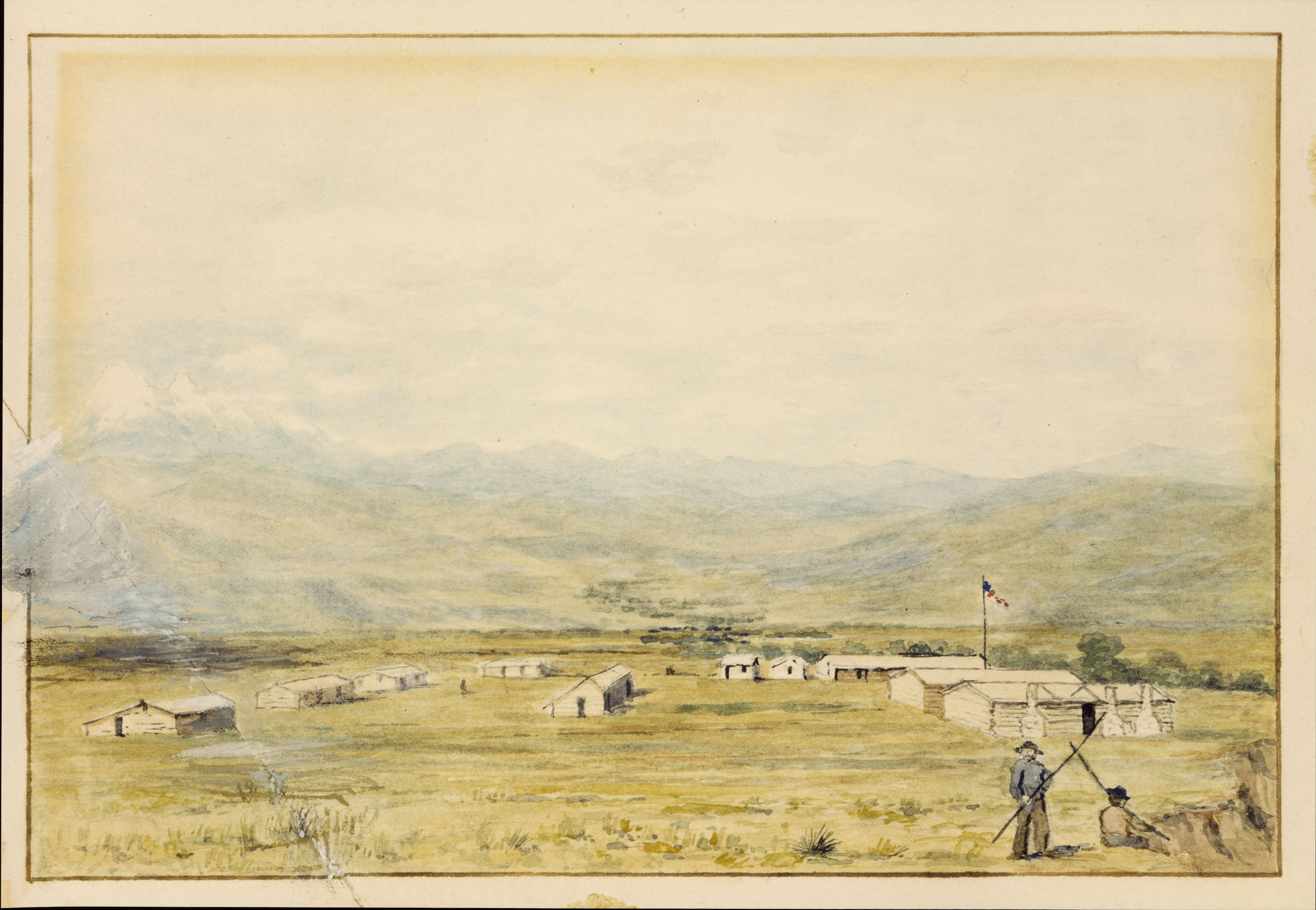
A painting of Camp Collins in 1865.

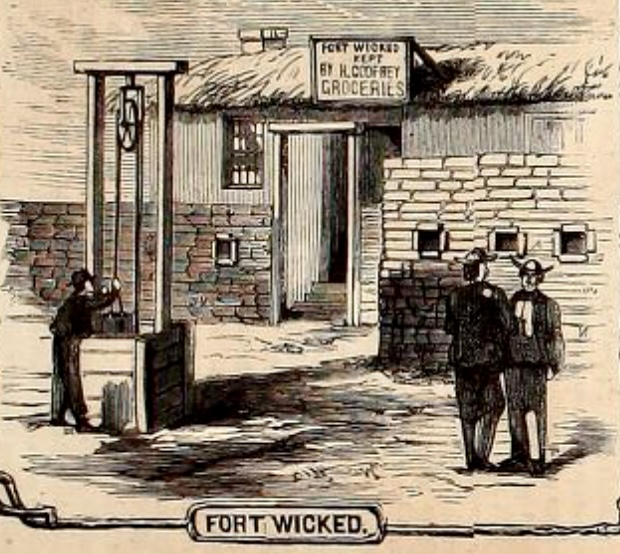
James F. Gookins' 1867 sketch of Fort Wicked.

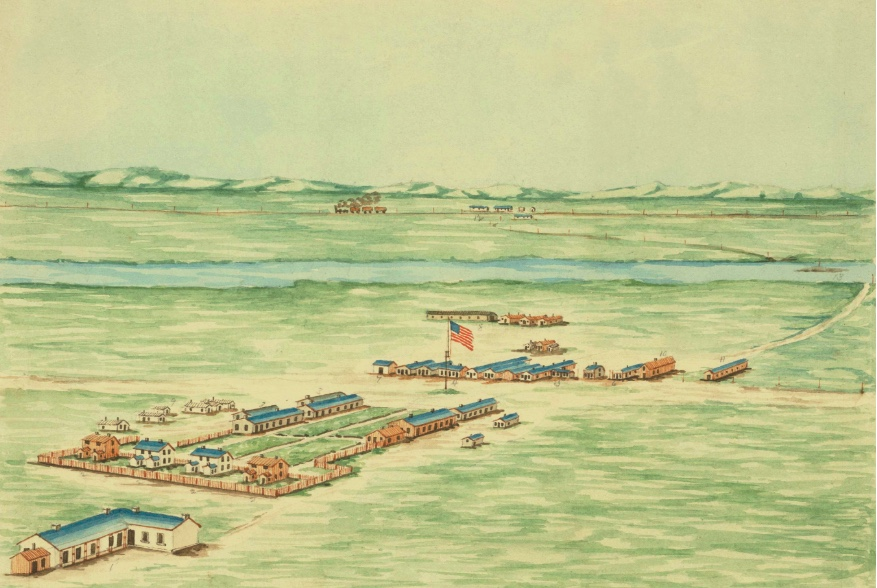
Anton Schonborn's 1870 painting of Fort Sedgwick.

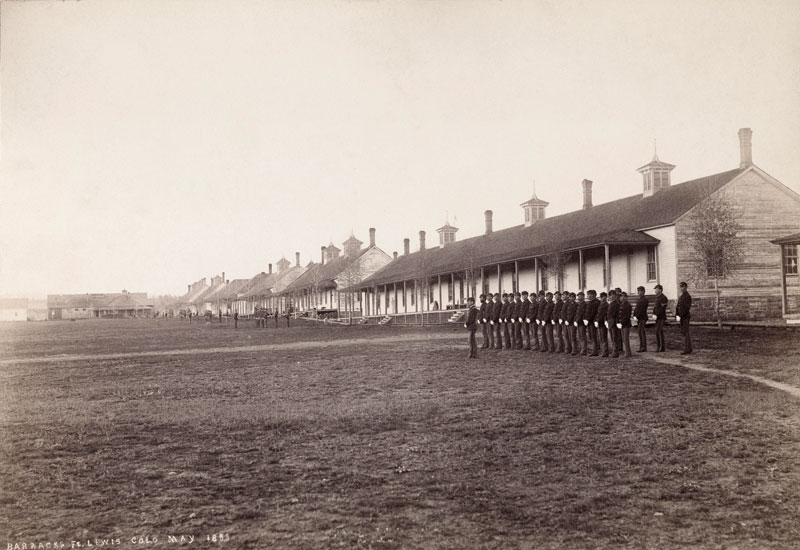
An 1883 photograph of Fort Lewis.

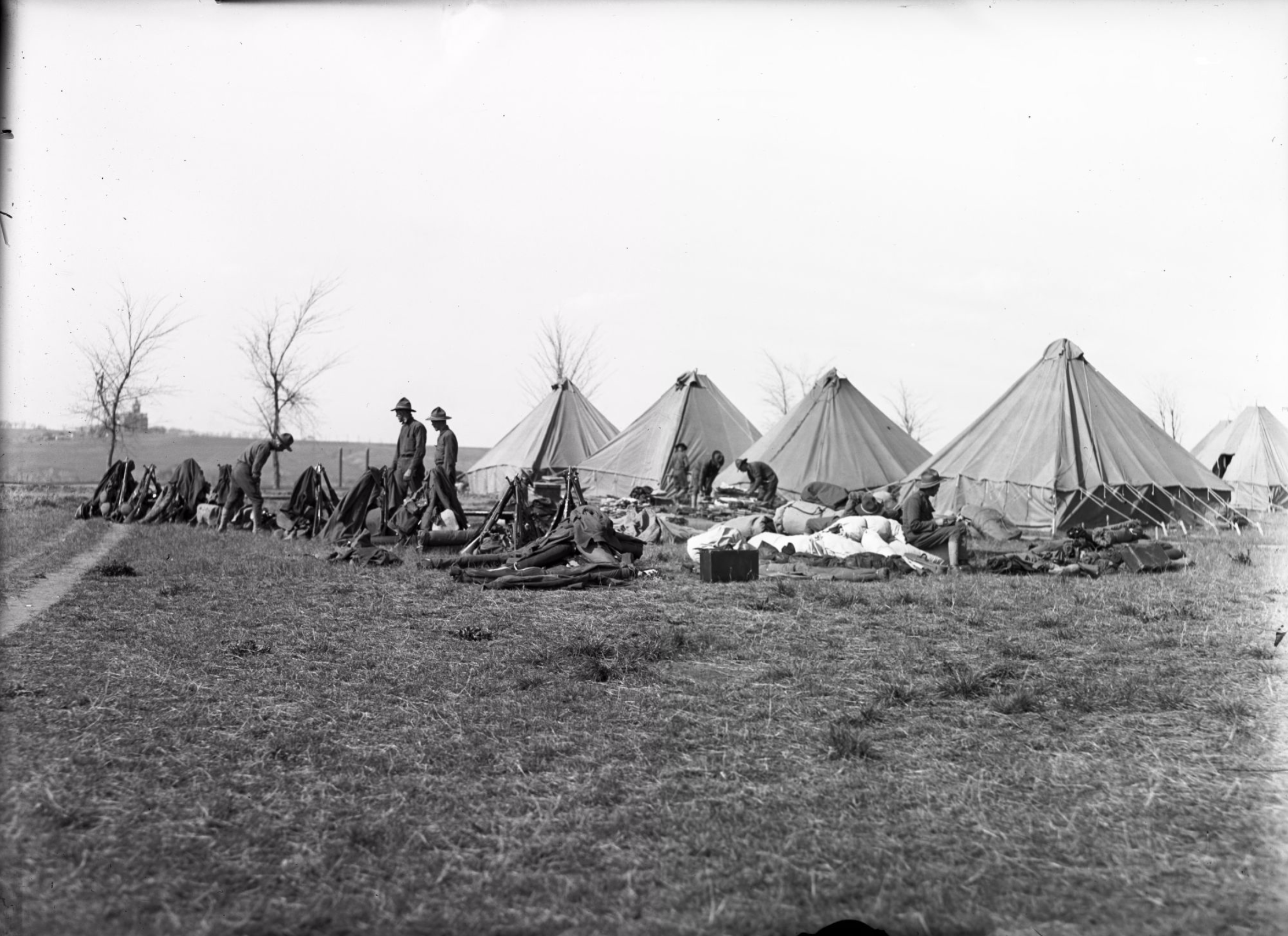
Troops encamped at Fort Logan during the Great War.

== See also ==
- Bibliography of Colorado
- Geography of Colorado
- History of Colorado
- Index of Colorado-related articles
- List of Colorado-related lists
  - List of military installations in Colorado
  - List of populated places in Colorado
  - List of post offices in Colorado
  - List of trading posts in Colorado
- Outline of Colorado
