= Trapper's Trail =

Historical trail or road

The Trapper's Trail or Trappers' Trail is a north-south path along the eastern base of the Rocky Mountains that links the Great Platte River Road at Fort Laramie and the Santa Fe Trail at Bent's Old Fort. Along this path there were a number of trading posts, also called trading forts.

== History ==
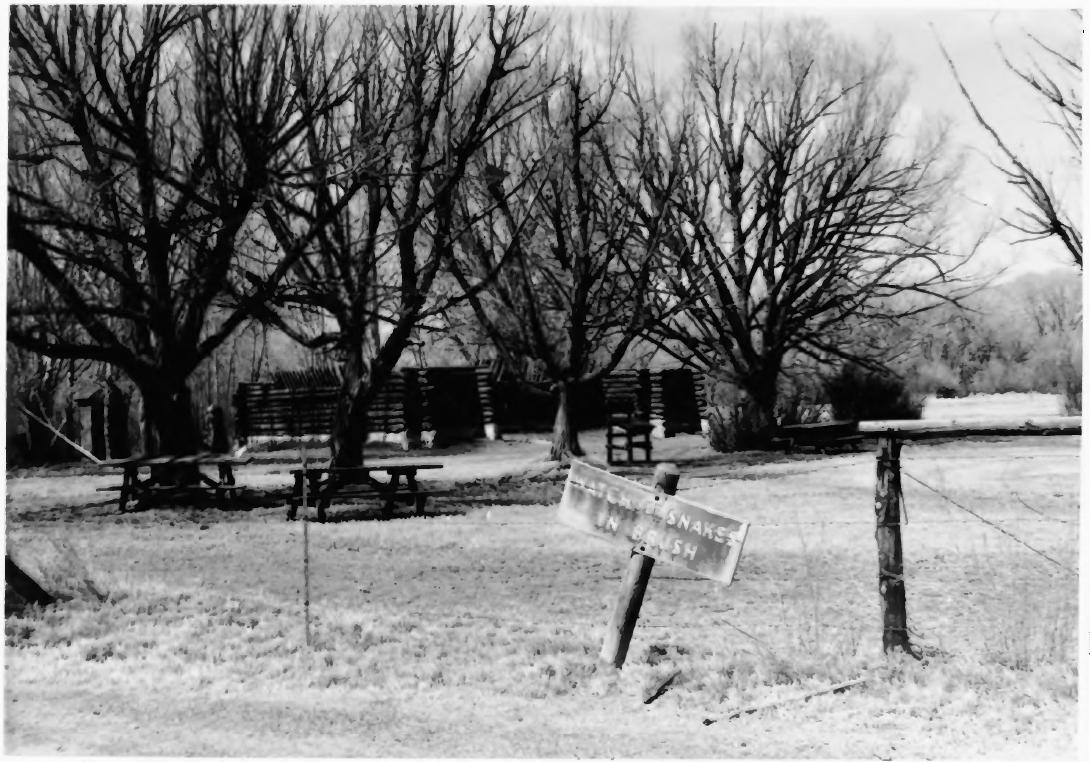
Reproduction of Pike's Stockade, a fortification near Sanford in Conejos County, Colorado. Built by the expedition of Zebulon Pike in 1807, the fort has been reconstructed by the Colorado Historical Society, and the site is a National Historic Landmark.

In 1802, after the Spanish territory of Louisiana was given back to France through treaty in 1800, trappers began entering the Louisiana Territory and trapped beavers in the mountains. In 1803, the United States purchased the land which encompassed the present state of Colorado with the Louisiana Purchase and explorers came to the area to survey the land. The trail was an important trade route for fur trappers and traders in the North American fur trade from about 1820 and into the Pikes Peak Gold Rush beginning 1859.

Trapper's Trail was first known to be used in 1820 for Stephen H. Long’s expedition. Colonel Henry Dodge used it in 1835 for the Dodge-Leavenworth Expedition or First Dragoon Expedition. Trapper’s Trail was also used by John C. Fremont (1843-1844) and General Stephen W. Kearney (1845). In 1846 it was used by a group of Mormon immigrants who established a branch of the Church of Jesus Christ of Latter-day Saints near the southern end of the trail. The sick detachments of the Mormon Battalion used this trail to return to the Mormon pioneers on the Mormon Trail. It was also used during the gold rush of 1859.

== Route description ==
From north to south, the main legs and stops along the trail are:

=== Fort Laramie to Denver area ===
The trail starts at Fort Laramie in Wyoming, which is located along the North Platte River. The trail follows Crow Creek to the Latham, Colorado area, where it traversed along the South Platte River. Traveling along the river, four trading posts were built in the late 1830s and are located and are part of the South Platte Trail. The most northern trading post is Fort Saint Vrain. The following are: Fort Vasquez, Fort Jackson, and Fort Lupton, first called Fort Lancaster. The trail continues along the South Platte River to an area near Denver

=== Denver area to Colorado Springs area ===
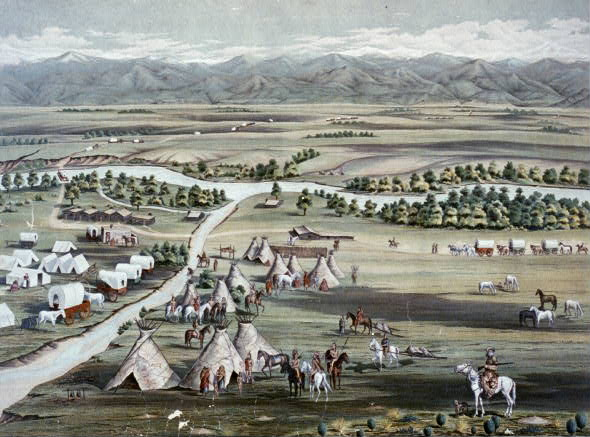
Denver in 1859

There are three trails between these areas. The oldest route, runs the closest to the mountains. It follows along the East Plum, Monument and Fountain Creeks and roughly ran along what is now I-25.

The Cherry Creek Trail follows Cherry Creek and runs essentially along the current Highway 83 between present day Denver and northern Colorado Springs near I-25. There are two stops along the Cherry Creek Trail. Twenty Mile House, located at the junction of Parker Road and Highway 83 in Parker, has a historical marker noting it was a stop on Trapper's Trail. California Ranch was a stage station and stockade at the junction of Highways 83 and 86 near Franktown. It also has a historical marker its role on the trail.

The Jimmy Camp Trail joins the Cherry Creek Trail near the present town of Franktown, runs through Falcon, and down Highway 24. The trail runs between the Arkansas and Platte Rivers. Jimmy's Camp site (now a ghost town in El Paso County) is east of Highway 24 at Jimmy Camp Creek. The Charles Fagan Grave, also called Fagan's Grave, is about 12.5 miles due north of Falcon.

=== Colorado Springs area to El Pueblo ===
From the present Colorado Springs area to El Pueblo, the route is similar to the I-25 route.

=== South and east of El Pueblo ===
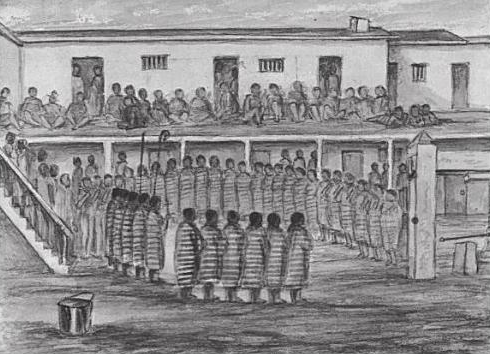
James William Abert, Bent's Fort, 1848

From El Pueblo, also called Fort Pueblo, there are two routes. (Note: The Colorado Department of Transportation states that instead of branching at El Pueblo, the trail branched at the Huerfano River, one branch went to Fort Reynolds (west of Bent's Fort) and another to Taos.) One is east to Bent's Old Fort, the trading post historical site is along the Arkansas River, and the trail follows Highway 50 and the Arkansas River from Pueblo.

Another route is from El Pueblo to Taos which is called the Taos Trail. The trail goes south, near the present day route of Interstate 25. John and Luisa Brown's trading post (1845-1849) was where the trail crossed a creek near present day Colorado City, Colorado. The trail continued southward to Huerfano Butte north of Walsenburg, then southwest to La Veta Pass following the route of U.S. Route 160 to Fort Garland then south to Taos through the San Luis Valley along the approximate route of Colorado State Highway 159 and New Mexico Highway 522. From Pueblo to Taos the distance was approximately 170 miles (270 km)
