= Henry Fraeb =

Henry Fraeb, also called Frapp, was a mountain man, fur trader, and trade post operator of the American West, operating in the present-day states of Colorado, Wyoming, and Montana.

== Early life ==
Fraeb, of German heritage, was from St. Louis, Missouri.

== Mountain man ==
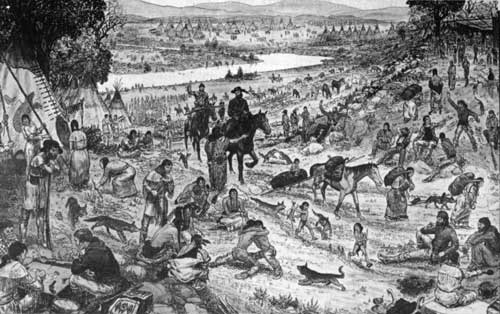
Typical rendezvous scene at which trappers and mountain men sold their furs and hides and replenished their supplies.

Fraeb trapped for beaver fur in the Rocky Mountain region, including Montana, where he is his considered one of the pioneering fur traders. He then was one of the owners of the Rocky Mountain Fur Company, along with Jim Bridger, Milton Sublette, Jean Baptiste Gervais, and Thomas Fitzpatrick. They bought the company in 1830 from the previous owners for $30,000, paying off the balance in three years. Although they were great trappers, they did not have experience in dealing with savvy, wealthy competitors. For instance, they had delayed shipments of furs back east, which resulted in cash flow and credit issues. Fraeb stated that he sold his partnership for $1,000 in merchandise, 40 horses, 40 traps, and eight guns. The company folded in 1834.

Fraeb became an independent trapper, until 1837, when he opened the Fort Jackson trading post near Ione, Colorado with his partner Peter Sarpy. Nearby posts and competitors were Fort Vasquez, Fort Lupton, and Fort Saint Vrain. Their backer, the Pratte, Chouteau & Company, sold the post to Bent, St. Vrain & Company. As the demand dropped for beaver fur, Fraeb focused on buffalo fur.

In 1841, Fraeb and Bridger built a log trading post, Fraeb's Post, near the Continental Divide and the Colorado-Wyoming Border. It was located at the confluence of the Little Snake River and Battle Creek at 40°59′58″N 107°14′12″W.

Fraeb and four others were killed in August 1841 by Sioux warriors at Battle Creek. He had been leading a group of 23 buffalo hunters into Encampment Valley when they were attacked by 500 Sioux, Cheyenne and Arapaho warriors. With him was friend and fellow mountain man, Jim Baker. Baker said that the Native Americans made about 40 charges to within 10 or 15 feet of the group of hunters, who had sought protection inside a circle made of their horses. Fraeb, who led the group shouted to not shoot until they were sure they had a shot. In the end, after finding a safer place behind log fortifications, the hunters repulsed the assaults. An estimated 40 Native Americans were killed or wounded. The five hunters who were killed were buried near the battle site.
