= Early history of the Arkansas Valley in Colorado =

17th to 19th century history of the valley

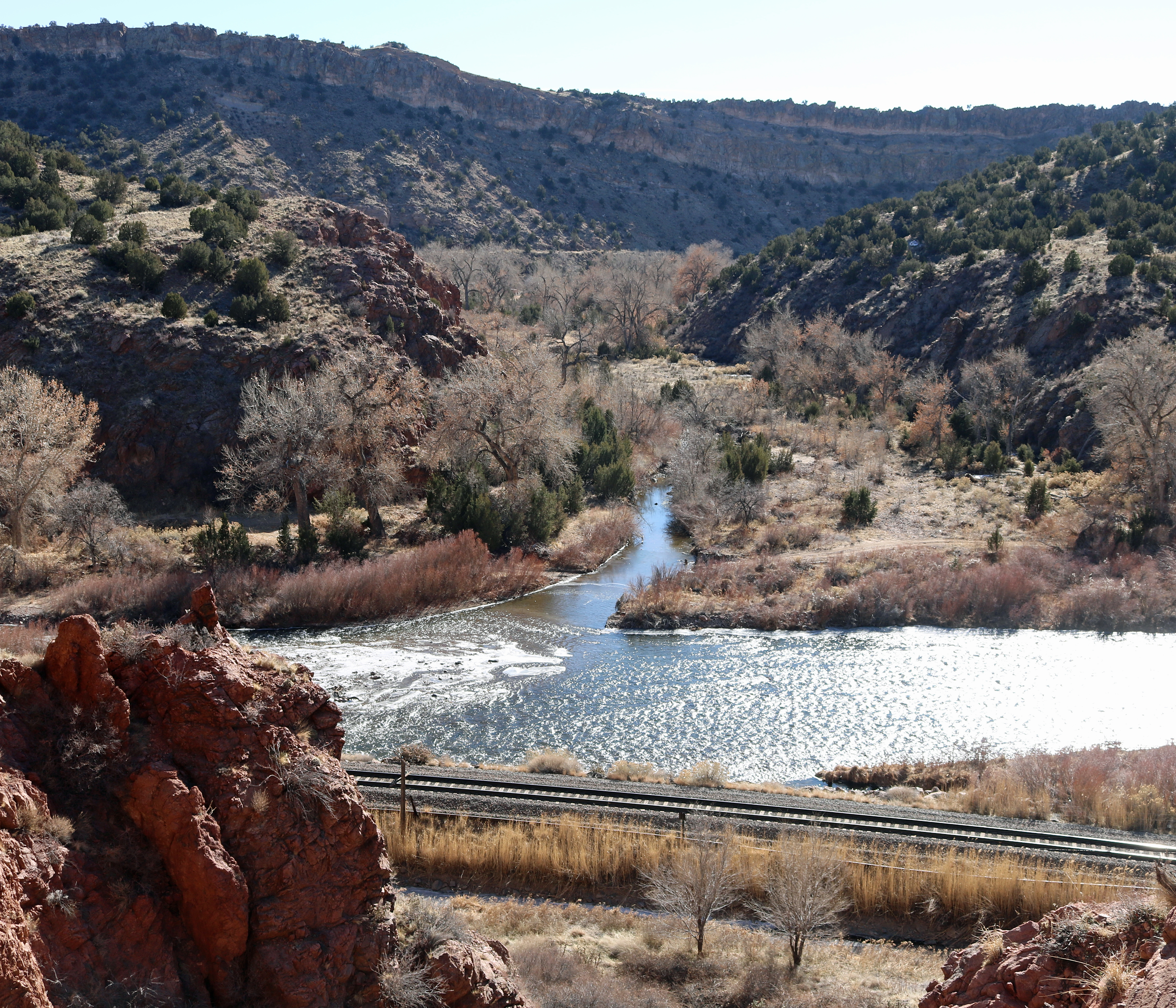
The confluence of Grape Creek and the Arkansas River in Colorado.

The early history of the Arkansas Valley in Colorado began in the 1600s and to the early 1800s when explorers, hunters, trappers, and traders of European descent came to the region. Prior to that, Colorado was home to prehistoric people, including Paleo-Indians, Ancestral Puebloans, and Late prehistoric Native Americans.

With westward expansion of the United States, Colorado saw a number of trading posts and small settlements established in the Arkansas and South Platte valleys including Bent's Fort and El Pueblo. Southern Colorado, previously part of New Spain, was ceded in 1848 to the United States following the end of the Mexican–American War (1846–48). The early history of the Arkansas valley ends with the Colorado Gold Rush of 1858 when large numbers of Anglo-Americans began to arrive in Colorado. Colorado achieved statehood in 1876. (Note: Quote from source: Pueblo, Hardscrabble, and Greenhorn were among the very first white settlements in Colorado)

== Native Americans ==
From prehistoric times until the 19th century, bands of the Ute people occupied the upper Arkansas River valley, roughly upstream from present day Pueblo, Colorado. East of Pueblo on the Great Plains and along the Arkansas lived the semi-agricultural Apache peoples of the Dismal River Culture. By the 1730s most of the Apache were driven southward by the Comanche who had begun to dominate the Arkansas River valley in Colorado. The Jicarilla Apache, however, survived by moving from the Arkansas River to the Colorado/New Mexico border area and cultivating friendly relations with the Spanish colonists in New Mexico. During the first half of the 19th century, some factions of the Arapaho and Cheyenne people moved southward into the Arkansas River Valley, becoming allies of the Comanche. Author Hämäläinen postulated a Comanche proto-empire in the early 19th century with an important trading emporium in the Big Timbers, a cottonwood forest bordering the Arkansas from La Junta downstream to near the Kansas border.

== New Spain and Mexico ==
The Spanish settled in New Mexico called the Arkansas River in Colorado the Rio Napestle. In 1644, Juan de Archuleta led the first known Spanish expedition to the Arkansas River valley in Colorado. Archuleta's objective was to find and force Pueblo Indians from Taos who had fled Spanish rule to El Quartelejo, a vaguely defined region from the Arkansas River northward. He found the runaway Pueblos near present day Las Animas. (Some sources state that this expedition took place in 1664.) In 1706, Juan de Ulibarri led another expedition to El Quartelejo, to recapture runaway Pueblos, crossing the Arkansas River in Colorado. In 1779, New Mexico Governor Juan Bautista de Anza led an expedition of more than 600 Spaniards and Indians north into Colorado to punish the Comanche who were raiding the Spanish colonies. De Anza defeated the Comanches south of the Arkansas River near Greenhorn Mountain. in 1787, the Spanish established a settlement called San Carlos de los Jupes at the junction of the Arkansas and the St. Charles River about 8 miles (13 km) east of present day Pueblo. The Jupes were a Comanche sub-tribe and the purpose of the settlement was to encourage the Comanches to become sedentary Christians. San Carlos failed within a year.

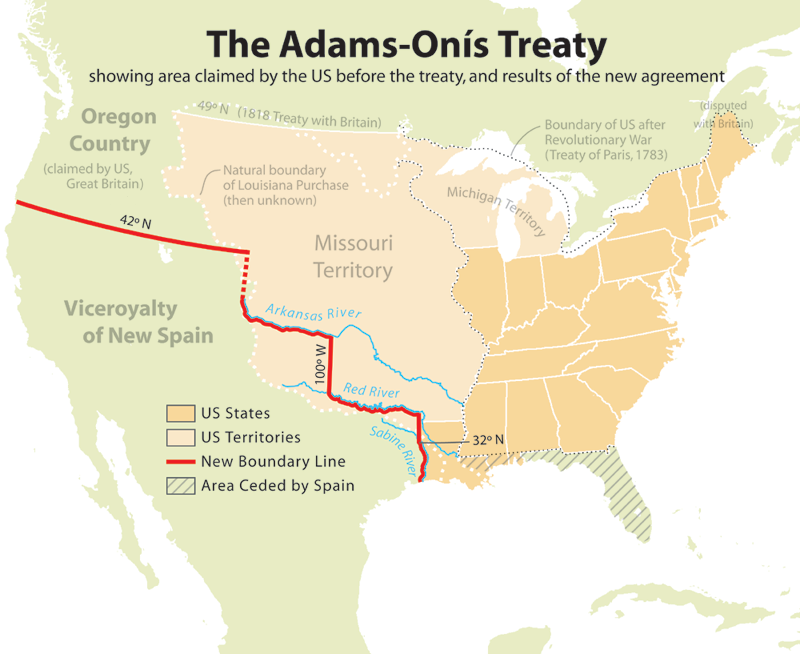
The Adams-Onis Treaty of 1819 established the border between the U.S. and Mexico at the Arkansas River in Colorado.

The Louisiana Purchase in 1803 gave the U.S. ownership of a large, but undefined, portion of the Arkansas River Valley. The Adams-Onis Treaty of 1819 established the border between Spanish Mexico and the United States in Colorado. Spanish territory was south of the Arkansas river and U.S. territory was north of the River. The government of New Mexico attempted to counter growing U.S. influence in its territory by giving large land grants to prominent citizens and encouraging settlement of the land grants. The Vigil and St. Vrain grant of 1843 spanned most of eastern Colorado south of the Arkansas. However, in 1848, the U.S. and Mexico signed the Treaty of Guadalupe Hidalgo by which New Mexico and southern Colorado became part of the United States.

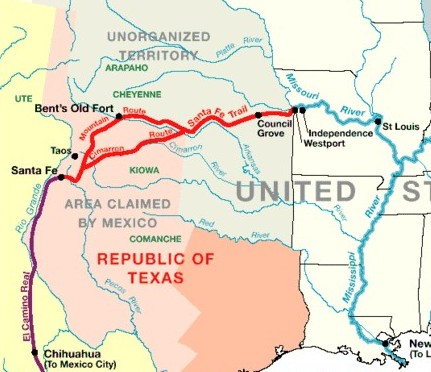
1845 Santa Fe Trail and native tribal lands

== The Americans ==
Kentuckian James Purcell (Pursley) is the first Anglo-American known to visit the Arkansas River in Colorado. In 1805, he traversed the upper Arkansas with a large band of Paducah (perhaps Plains Apache) and Kiowa Indians. The Zebulon Pike expedition of 1806 followed the Arkansas River upstream to explore for the United States the newly acquired Louisiana territory. Pike and his men strayed into Spanish territory and were arrested and imprisoned. In 1811 Ezekial Williams (not to be confused with Old Bill Williams) trapped in the upper Arkansas valley.

William Becknell opened trade between the United States and newly-independent Mexico in 1821 when he established the Santa Fe Trail. Becknell's pack train followed the Arkansas River from Missouri to near present-day La Junta, Colorado, then turned southwest and followed the Arkansas River tributary, the Purgatoire River, southwest to New Mexico. Wagon trains with trade goods followed this route until 1880. In 1822 Jacob Fowler and a few men of the Glenn-Fowler Expedition spent a month living at the future site of Pueblo becoming the first residents, albeit temporary, of the Arkansas River valley in Colorado. The American interest in the region in the 1820s and 1830s was two-fold: trade with New Mexico via the Santa Fe Trail and trapping for furs, primarily beaver. This was the era of the mountain men, Americans, including men of Anglo, French, American Indian and African-American descent, who roamed the Rocky Mountains to trap beaver whose pelts were used to make fashionable top hats. Taos, New Mexico was the base for many of the mountain men who trapped and explored the Arkansas Valley.

Trappers played an important role in the westward expansion of the United States: "They knew the easiest routes through the high mountains, which rivers could lead a party to safety and which were likely to lead to tragedy. They could tell you what you could expect to find to eat or drink and what weather or wildlife might be encountered. Much of this wealth of knowledge was passed on by word of mouth."

=== John Gantt ===
Gantt's Picket Post, also known as Fort Gantt, was established near the present-day Las Animas in 1832 by John Gantt (also Gannt) and Jefferson Blackwell. It operated as a trading post until some time in 1834. Fort Cass was then built near the present-day city of Pueblo, Colorado by John Gantt, a former Army officer. In May 1934, it was on the north side of the Arkansas River, about 6 miles below Fountain Creek. William Bent of St. Vrain & Company attacked Shoshone Indians trading at Gantt's Fort, killing a few and driving them away. Gantt abandoned his fort that winter. The Bents left their stockade and established Bent's Fort about 70 miles down the Arkansas. The adobe forts were built by Mexican laborers hired for construction and other work. Mexican workmen constructed permanent adobe forts and trading posts as far north and west as Idaho and were a major part of the frontier workforce forming the foundation of the bi-cultural population of Southern Colorado. (Note: Quote from source: John Gantt was the first to make a business of trading with the Indians on the Arkansas.) The trading post operated until some time in 1835.

=== Bent, St. Vrain & Company ===
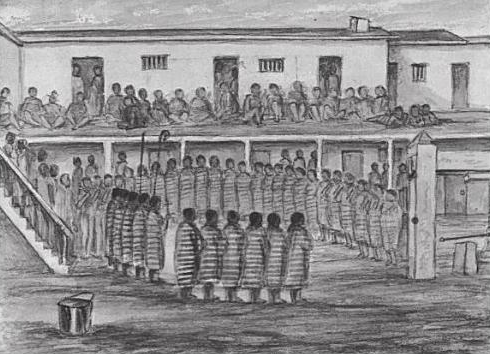
Bent's Fort in 1848

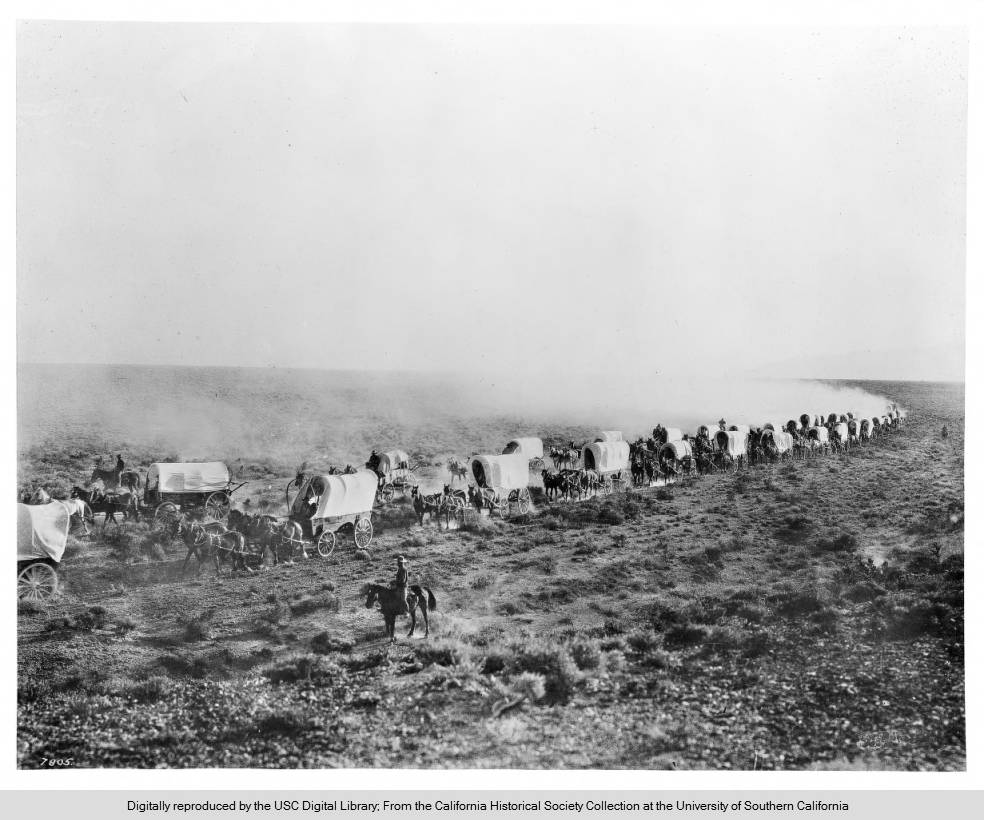
Train of covered wagons on the Santa Fe Trail

Bent, St. Vrain & Company was a partnership formed in New Mexico by Charles Bent and Ceran St. Vrain, traders on the Santa Fe Trail from St. Louis. In 1832 they entered the Indian trade as licensed traders, completing Bent's Fort in 1835 with Charles' younger brother William as manager. William Bent, as well as younger brothers George and Robert later became partners. Marcellin St. Vrain, Ceran's younger brother, who managed Fort St. Vrain for the firm on the South Platte, was never a partner. In addition to Bent's Fort on the Arkansas and Fort St. Vrain on the South Platte the firm maintained a store in Taos managed by Charles Beaubien. The firm's relations with the Cheyenne was cemented by the marriage of William with Owl Woman, daughter of White Thunder, Keeper of the Sacred Arrows of the Cheyenne. A post built on the South Canadian River to trade with the Kiowa and Comanche was only briefly maintained; however, later, two battles were fought at its ruins, by then known as Adobe Walls. (Note: Quote from source: By 1842 Bent's Fort reigned supreme in the Arkansas Valley. Competing posts were so short lived that almost no records of them remain.)

=== El Pueblo ===
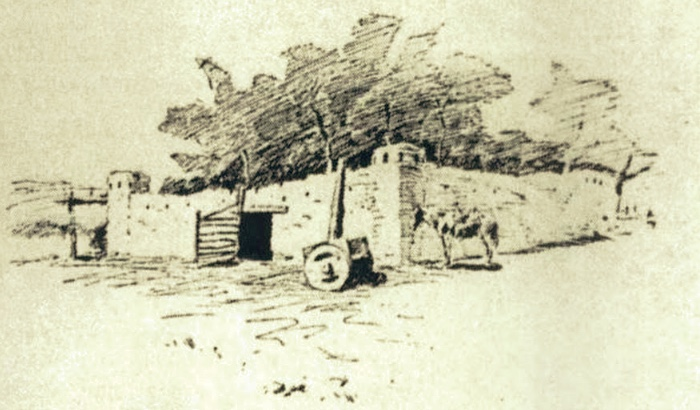
El Pueblo was believed to have looked like the Mexican Ranch by Colonel Henry Inman, published in The Old Santa Fe Trail, 1897

The fur trade collapsed about 1840 due to over-trapping and changing fashions. Former trappers were forced to seek alternative occupations which led to the establishment of trading and agricultural settlements in the Arkansas River valley of Colorado. El Pueblo, also called Fort Pueblo, was an adobe settlement and trading post built in 1842 by a group of independent traders at the ford of the Arkansas about half a mile west of the Fountain River. The exact location of the site is somewhat uncertain but is near First Street and Santa Fe Avenue in Pueblo, Colorado. The course of the Arkansas has changed by floods and the ford is gone, as is all surface evidence of the buildings at the fort. The builders of Fort Pueblo included George Simpson, son of a wealthy St. Louis merchant, who at 23 had set out in May 1841 on the Oregon Trail with a mule-drawn wagon. Simpson received a yearly remittance from his father throughout his life. Simpson was side-tracked from his westward journey at Fort Laramie when he was invited by William S. Williams to join a company of fur trappers. However, he never went but was hired by Robert Fisher a trader for Bent & St. Vrain and journeyed down the Front Range of the Rockies to Bent's Fort where he learned the basics of trading with the Indians. Fisher was his principle associate in establishing Fort Pueblo.

In 1847, George Ruxton described Pueblo as "a small square fort of adobe with circular bastions at the corners, no part of the walls being more than eight feet high, and round the inside of the yard or corral are built some half-dozen little rooms inhabited by as many Indian traders, coureurs des bois, and mountain men."

== See also ==
- John Brown (mountain man)
- List of forts in Colorado
- Mountain man
  - List of mountain men
- Teresita Sandoval

== Sources ==
- Lecompte, Janet (1978). Pueblo, Hardscrabble, Greenhorn: The Upper Arkansas, 1832-1856. Norman, Oklahoma: University of Oklahoma Press. pp. 1–354. ISBN 0-8061-1462-2.
