= Fort Lupton =

Fort Lupton may refer to:

- Fort Lupton, Colorado, a city in Weld County
- Fort Lupton (Colorado), a trading post around which the city of Fort Lupton was formed
