= Fort Jackson (Colorado) =

- Trading post and fort
- Location within Colorado Location within the United States
- Coordinates: 40°09′N 104°49′W
- Country: United States
- State: Colorado
- County: Weld
- Nearest town: Ione
- Built: 1837
- Demolished: 1838

Fort Jackson was a fur trading post near the present-day town of Ione in Weld County, Colorado that operated from 1837 to 1838. It was one of the four trading posts along the South Platte River area. Nearby posts and competitors were Fort Vasquez, Fort Lupton, and Fort Saint Vrain.

== History ==
It was built in the early part of 1837 near Platteville, Colorado at a cost of $12,000 by Peter A. Sarpy and Henry Fraeb and partially financed by the Western Division of the American Fur Company. This fort was very aggressive and attempted to capture trade in the Rocky Mountains. Sarpy said that "My object is to do all harm possible to the opposition and yet without harming ourselves." The Cheyenne and the Arapaho were customers of this fort. They wintered in lodges nearby and would trade buffalo furs gathered during their summer hunting season.

To meet the local competitive pressure, Sarpy and Fraeb financed good for their post, financed by Pratte, Chouteau & Company of St. Louis. They also took in buffalo robes worth $9,715.87 ($249,125 today), but their business interest was transferred in October 1838 to Bent, St. Vrain & Company, which operated Fort Saint Vrain. The post was demolished after the inventory was removed.

== See also ==
- Bibliography of Colorado
- Geography of Colorado
- History of Colorado
- Index of Colorado-related articles
- List of Colorado-related lists
  - List of forts in Colorado
- Outline of Colorado
