= Glenn–Fowler expedition =

The Glenn–Fowler expedition to Santa Fe, New Mexico was led by Hugh Glenn and Jacob Fowler to see whether trade with the Spanish in the region would be feasible. The expedition was made up of 21 men. (Note: It was a diverse group composed of African Americans, American Indians, French, and Spanish.) They left their establishment on the Verdigris River in present-day Oklahoma on September 25, 1821, and arrived in Santa Fe in January 1822, and found that the Spanish authority in the region had been ended by the Mexican War of Independence.

The new Mexican government was quite happy to promote trade between Mexico and the United States. The authorities gave the expedition to trap and hunt in the formerly Spanish lands. The expedition members obtained nearly 1,100 pounds (500 kg) of furs before they left the area on their return trip. They returned home successfully, proving that trade with the Santa Fe area was feasible. The profitable trip, along with the earlier trip of William Becknell, led to the establishment of the Santa Fe Trail. (Note: William Becknell led an expedition from St. Louis, Missouri to Santa Fe in the fall of 1821. He arrived in Santa Fe via the Arkansas River, the Cimarron River and the Raton Pass in November, 1821, returning to Missouri in January 1822. Becknell led two more expeditions from Missouri to Santa Fe later in the 1820s)

Glenn and Fowler were the first Anglo Americans to travel in the region around modern-day Pueblo. While exploring that area, they learned that the Spanish government no longer was in control. The Mexican government had gained control of the former Spanish territory.

== Route ==
Colonel Hugh Glenn was formerly an Ohio banker and businessman who came to the Indian Territory, where he opened a trading post near the mouth of the Verdigris River. He had met Jacob Fowler while they both served in the U.S. Army during the War of 1812. In 1821, they had agreed to form an overland expedition that would travel to Santa Fe and try to establish a trading relationship. Fowler left Fort Smith, where he was staying and traveled to Glenn's trading post in September, 1821.

After assembling a party of 21 men, the expedition commenced on September 21, 1821. They followed the Verdigris north to the confluence with the Caney River, where they camped near the present site of Bartlesville. They continued north into Kansas Territory, then proceeded to the Arkansas River, near present-day Wichita. Then they followed the river into Colorado Territory. (Note: According to the Encyclopedia of Oklahoma History, the expedition followed the north bank of the Arkansas from Three Forks., The article by Thomas seems to be in error, because the same article says that the expedition camped along the Caney River near the present site of Bartlesville. To do so would have required a significant detour from a route up the Arkansas from Three Forks. Mullins' version appears more plausible.)

On October 27, the expedition crossed to the south bank of the Arkansas River and entered Spanish Territory. They first saw the Spanish Peaks in what is now southeastern Colorado on November 13. They began to encounter Kiowas in large numbers during the following week, but the meetings were tense and establishing trade was nearly impossible. Moving on, the party met Spanish troops in Taos who informed them that the area now belonged to Mexico, which had defeated Spain in the Mexican Revolution.

== Result ==
The Glenn–Fowler expedition was considered successful. It not only met the original objective of proving feasibility of trade between the United States and Spanish North America, but confirmed the route that would later be followed by the Santa Fe Trail. The new Mexican government was quite happy to promote trade between Mexico and the United States. The authorities gave the expedition to trap and hunt in the formerly Spanish lands. The expedition members obtained nearly 1,100 pounds (500 kg) of furs before they left the area on their return trip on June 1, 1822.

== Aftermath ==
Hugh Glenn returned to Cincinnati, where he died on May 28, 1833, at the age of 45. His expedition's success had not gotten him out of financial difficulties. Jacob Fowler went to Covington, Kentucky, where he lived to age 85 and died October 15, 1849.
