= Bent, St. Vrain & Company =

- Type: General partnership
- Industry: Santa Fe trade, fur trade, Indian trade
- Founded: 1830
- Founder: Charles Bent, Ceran St. Vrain
- Defunct: 1849
- Fate: Dissolved
- Successor: William Bent & Company
- Headquarters: St. Louis, Santa Fe
- Area served: Rocky Mountains, New Mexico, Texas Panhandle

Bent, St. Vrain & Company was a fur trading and Indian trading business active from 1830 to 1849, in the Republic of Mexico, the Republic of Texas, and in the unorganized territory of the United States.

== Formation and operations ==
Bent, St. Vrain & Company was formed as a partnership between Charles Bent and Ceran St. Vrain in 1830. The following year, William Bent, brother of Charles, joined the company as a partner. The commercial basis for the company was the transport and sale of manufactured goods from St. Louis to Santa Fe, via the Santa Fe Trail, and the procurement and transportation of furs and buffalo robes in return. Its annual revenue from the fur trade, about $400,000, made them the largest American fur trade outfit next to the American Fur Company. The company owned stores in Santa Fe and Taos, and a mill at the latter place. It built a number of trading posts, called forts, in the Indian country, for trade with Native American hunters, French, Hispanic and American mountain men, as well as with teamsters, settlers and others on the Santa Fe trail.

== Dissolution ==
The United States occupation of New Mexico during the Mexican–American War led to the end of Bent, St. Vrain & Company. Charles Bent was appointed governor of New Mexico by the United States Army, before the formal cession of the territory to the United States, and was murdered as a prelude to the Taos Revolt by Mexican and Native American insurgents. The general unrest after the revolt and the psychological stress of the surviving partners, especially in conjunction with the diminishing demands for fur on the world market, caused the dissolution of the company in 1849.

== Trading posts ==
- Bents Old Fort, 1833–1849.
- Fort Saint Vrain, 1837–1844.
- Fort Jackson, bought and closed down 1838.
- Fort Adobe, 1845–1846?
