= Lancaster Lupton =

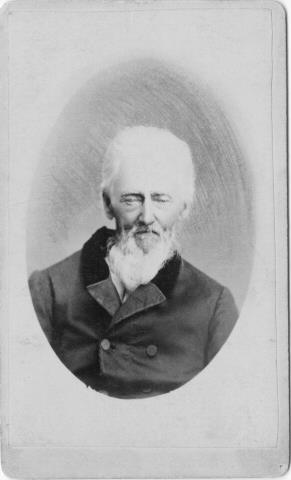
- Born: 21 September 1807; New York
- Died: 1 October 1885; Arcata
- Resting place: Blue Lake Cemetery
- Education: United States Military Academy

Lancaster Platt Lupton (September 21, 1807 – October 1, 1885) was the son of William Lupton, Jr. (a New York City Lawyer). He attended West Point, graduating with the class of 1829. In 1835, Lupton was a member of Colonel Henry Dodge's United States Regiment of Dragoons when they passed through the South Platte Valley in what would become the state of Colorado. Lupton saw the potential for a successful trading post on the banks of the South Platte River. He resigned his commission and returned the next year to build Fort Lancaster, later called Fort Lupton.

In present Nebraska in 1838 Lupton married Tomasina, the daughter of a Cheyenne Chief. They remained married until his death in 1885.

Fort Lancaster operated as a fur trading post until 1844, when a particularly harsh blizzard caused the fort to close and Lupton moved his family south to an area near modern-day Pueblo, Colorado. Later, they moved to California during the 1849 Gold Rush. Lupton lived in California until his death in 1885.
