= Fort Lupton (Colorado) =

- Trading post and fort
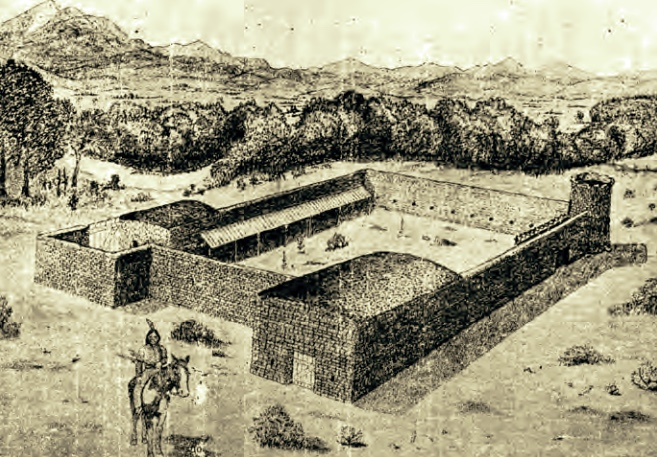
- Sketch of Fort Lupton, 1913, Dr. K.L. Clock. Developed from examinations of the ruins of the fort and interviews with pioneers. Given to the Colorado Historical Society.
- Nickname: Fort Lancaster
- Site of reconstructed fort, a few yards from the original site
- Coordinates: 40°5′54.3″N 104°49′9.68″W
- Country: United States
- State: Colorado
- County: Weld
- City: Fort Lupton
- Founder: Lawrence Lupton

Fort Lupton, located in the city of the same name, was a trading post from 1836 or 1837 to 1844. After operating as a stage coach station and used as a house, the building fell into disrepair and crumbled to all but a portion of one wall by the early 20th century. The trading post has been reconstructed yards away from its original site and is now part of the South Platte Historical Park in northwestern Fort Lupton, Colorado.

== History ==
First called Fort Lancaster, it was established by Lancaster Lupton, a former lieutenant, dragoon soldier, and West Point graduate. He first visited the area during the Dodge-Leavenworth Expedition with Col. Henry Dodge. He resigned and returned to the South Platte area to build the trading post with the assistance of Mexican and Native American men. It had 15-foot walls of adobe brick and an enclosed area of about 125 feet by 150 feet. For defense, it had a tower overlooking the countryside and holes on the second floor to shoot rifles at hostile people. The fort contained a series of small rooms used for living quarters and trading, a blacksmith shop, and a commissary.

Fort Lupton was one of several trading posts established along a 13-mile stretch of the South Platte River in the late 1830s. The others were Fort Jackson, Fort Vasquez, and Fort Saint Vrain. Trappers and Native Americans traded at Fort Lupton, which was located on the Trapper's Trail between Laramie, Wyoming and Santa Fe. They traded buffalo hides and beaver pelts for goods, such as food staples, cloth, blankets, pots, pans, knives, and guns. Supplies and livestock were also sold to settlers. Traders could made enough money in one summer to purchase a farm in the eastern portion of the United States. There may have been as many as 40 people living at the trading post, many of whom were Spanish-speaking employees, during its operation. Rufus Sage, Kit Carson and John C. Frémont visited Fort Lupton. In the early 1840s, the fur trade collapsed and the trading posts closed.

== Aftermath and reconstruction ==
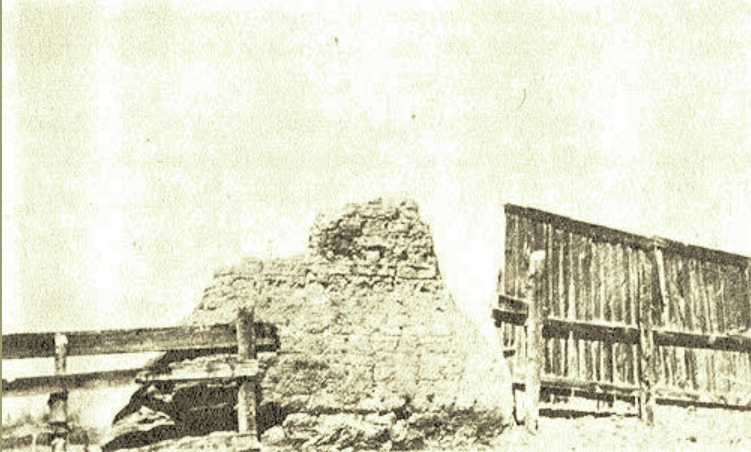
A portion of the wall from the former Fort Lupton trading post,1913

After the trading post closed, it was unused until 1859 when it was used as a stage station during the gold rush. It was then used by a family named Ewing as a house for a number of years. It had deteriorated by 1900 and only a wall remained by the 1920s. In 1926, the Territorial Daughters of Colorado installed a wrought iron fence and historical marker at the site of the former trading post. The land was repurposed again when an oil rig was established there. Later, the land was acquired by the South Platte Historical Society. The original site of the fort is an archaeological site.

In 2009, the fort was reconstructed a few yards from the site of the trading post using some of the original adobe bricks. South Platte Valley Historical Park was established by the South Platte Valley Historical Society northwest of the city of Fort Lupton. It includes a reconstruction of the adobe trading post, Fort Lupton, and is a historical park about area settlement.

== See also ==
- Bibliography of Colorado
- Geography of Colorado
- History of Colorado
- Index of Colorado-related articles
- List of Colorado-related lists
  - List of forts in Colorado
- Outline of Colorado
