= Fort Lupton, Colorado =

Statutory town in Weld County, Colorado, United States

- Statutory city
- City of Fort Lupton
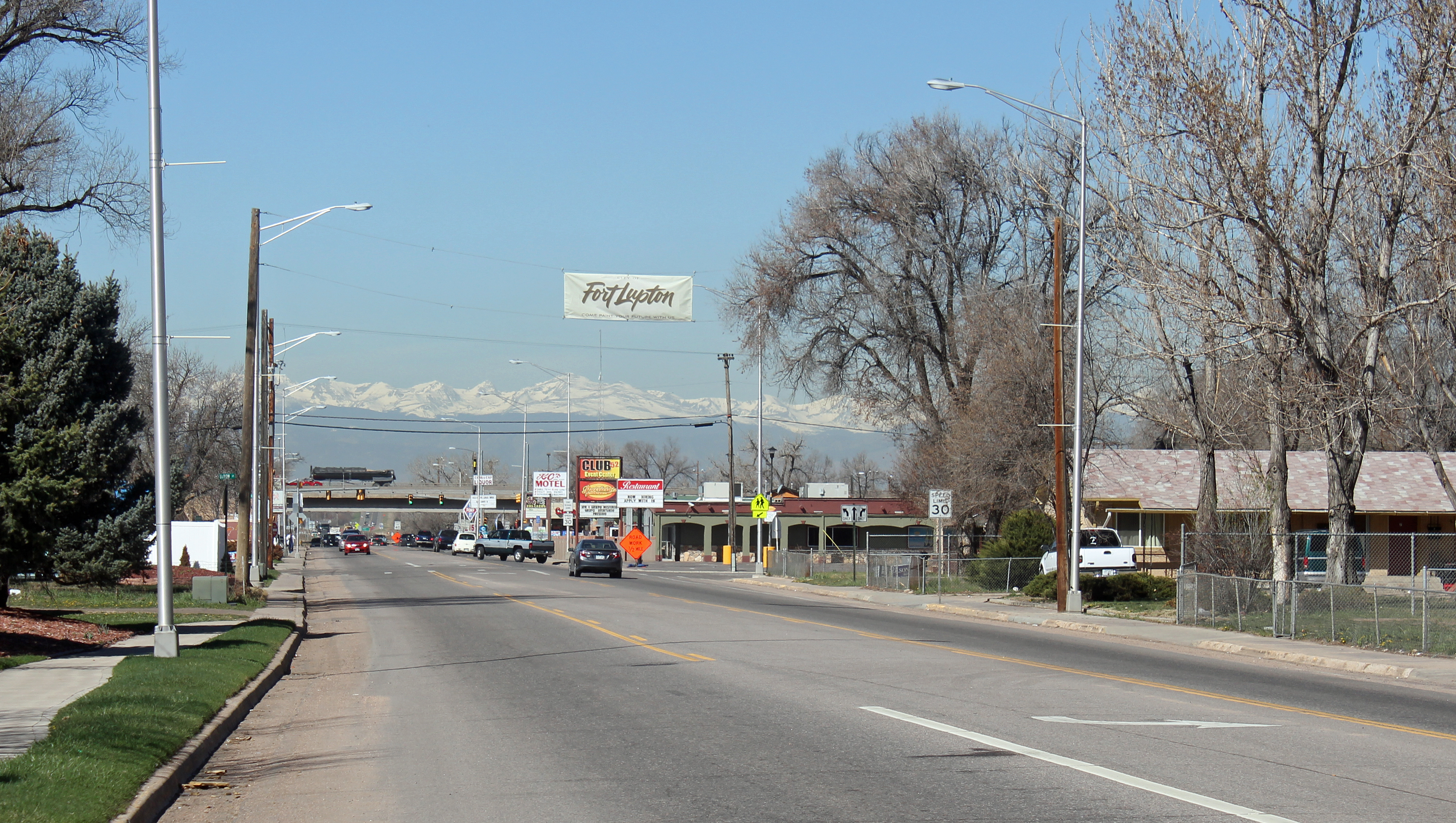
- Looking west along 1st Street in Fort Lupton.

- Flag Logo
- Motto: "Where Tradition Builds the Future"
- Location of the City of Fort Lupton in Weld County, Colorado
- Coordinates: 40°05′30″N 104°49′45″W
- Country: United States
- State: Colorado
- County: Weld

Government
  - Type: statutory city

Area
  - Total: 12.199 sq mi (31.596 km^{2})
  - Land: 12.146 sq mi (31.459 km^{2})
  - Water: 0.053 sq mi (0.137 km^{2})
- Elevation: 4,915 ft (1,498 m)

Population (2020)
  - Total: 7,955
  - Density: 655/sq mi (253/km^{2})
- Time zone: UTC−07:00 (MST)
  - Summer (DST): UTC−06:00 (MDT)
- ZIP code: 80621
- Area codes: 303/720/983
- GNIS city ID: 2410528
- FIPS code: 08-27700
- Website: www.fortluptonco.gov

The City of Fort Lupton is a statutory city located in southern Weld County, Colorado, United States. The town population was 7,955 at the 2020 United States census. Fort Lupton is a part of the Greeley, CO Metropolitan Statistical Area and the Front Range Urban Corridor.

== History ==
The city was named for Lieutenant Lancaster Lupton, who built a trading post on Adobe Creek in 1838. The trading post, Fort Lupton, has been reconstructed near the site of the original fort using some of the original adobe bricks at the South Platte Valley Historical Park, which was established by the South Platte Valley Historical Society northwest of the city of Fort Lupton. It is a historical park about early area settlement.

The Territory of Colorado was organized on February 28, 1861, and the Fort Lupton, Colorado Territory, post office opened on January 18, 1869. Colorado became a state on August 1, 1876. The Town of Fort Lupton was incorporated on January 15, 1890.

== Geography ==
At the 2020 United States census, the town had a total area of 7,808 acres (31.596 km^{2}) including 34 acres (0.137 km^{2}) of water.

== Demographics ==
Historical population
| Census | Pop. | Note | %± |
|---|---|---|---|
| 1890 | 113 | | — |
| 1900 | 214 | | 89.4% |
| 1910 | 614 | | 186.9% |
| 1920 | 1,014 | | 65.1% |
| 1930 | 1,578 | | 55.6% |
| 1940 | 1,692 | | 7.2% |
| 1950 | 1,907 | | 12.7% |
| 1960 | 2,194 | | 15.0% |
| 1970 | 2,489 | | 13.4% |
| 1980 | 4,251 | | 70.8% |
| 1990 | 5,159 | | 21.4% |
| 2000 | 6,787 | | 31.6% |
| 2010 | 7,377 | | 8.7% |
| 2020 | 7,955 | | 7.8% |
| 2023 (est.) | 9,447 | ▲ | 18.8% |
U.S. Decennial Census

=== 2020 census ===
As of the 2020 census, Fort Lupton had a population of 7,955. The median age was 34.8 years. 27.1% of residents were under the age of 18 and 12.3% of residents were 65 years of age or older. For every 100 females there were 98.9 males, and for every 100 females age 18 and over there were 99.1 males age 18 and over.

95.2% of residents lived in urban areas, while 4.8% lived in rural areas.

There were 2,620 households in Fort Lupton, of which 40.0% had children under the age of 18 living in them. Of all households, 51.9% were married-couple households, 18.3% were households with a male householder and no spouse or partner present, and 23.4% were households with a female householder and no spouse or partner present. About 21.0% of all households were made up of individuals and 8.1% had someone living alone who was 65 years of age or older.

There were 2,732 housing units, of which 4.1% were vacant. The homeowner vacancy rate was 1.5% and the rental vacancy rate was 4.3%.

Racial composition as of the 2020 census
| Race | Number | Percent |
|---|---|---|
| White | 4,302 | 54.1% |
| Black or African American | 56 | 0.7% |
| American Indian and Alaska Native | 152 | 1.9% |
| Asian | 35 | 0.4% |
| Native Hawaiian and Other Pacific Islander | 5 | 0.1% |
| Some other race | 1,957 | 24.6% |
| Two or more races | 1,448 | 18.2% |
| Hispanic or Latino (of any race) | 4,396 | 55.3% |

=== 2000 census ===
As of the census of 2000, there were 6,787 people, 2,099 households, and 1,677 families residing in the city. The population density was 1,707.2 inhabitants per square mile (659.2/km^{2}). There were 2,132 housing units at an average density of 536.3 per square mile (207.1/km^{2}). The racial makeup of the city was 70.34% White, 0.43% African American, 1.36% Native American, 0.83% Asian, 0.03% Pacific Islander, 22.65% from other races, and 4.38% from two or more races. Hispanic or Latino of any race were 47.38% of the population.

There were 2,099 households, out of which 48.2% had children under the age of 18 living with them, 61.0% were married couples living together, 13.1% had a female householder with no husband present, and 20.1% were non-families. 16.9% of all households were made up of individuals, and 6.4% had someone living alone who was 65 years of age or older. The average household size was 3.23 and the average family size was 3.62.

In the city, the population was spread out, with 34.4% under the age of 18, 10.4% from 18 to 24, 30.9% from 25 to 44, 17.7% from 45 to 64, and 6.6% who were 65 years of age or older. The median age was 29 years. For every 100 females, there were 103.9 males. For every 100 females age 18 and over, there were 100.6 males.

The median income for a household in the city was $40,917, and the median income for a family was $45,348. Males had a median income of $34,368 versus $23,849 for females. The per capita income for the city was $15,649. About 11.3% of families and 13.3% of the population were below the poverty line, including 15.3% of those under age 18 and 17.2% of those age 65 or over.

== Education ==
Fort Lupton is part of Weld County Public School District RE-8, which includes Fort Lupton Middle School Fort Lupton High School, Butler Elementary, Twombly Elementary, Little Trappers Preschool, and Kenneth Homyak PK-8. As of 2013, Fort Lupton High School had 560 students in grades 9-12. A controversy arose at the high school in September 2013 when a group of parents sought to remove the novel Looking for Alaska, the 2006 Michael L. Printz Award winner by John Green from the school's curriculum.

== Notable people ==
- Gabe Evans, U.S. representative and former Colorado state representative
- John Naka, Japanese-America bonsai grandmaster, was born in and spent his first eight years there.
- Brian Shaw, leading American strongman, placed first in the 2011, 2013, 2015, and 2016 World's Strongest Man.

== See also ==
- Greeley, CO Metropolitan Statistical Area
- Denver-Aurora-Greeley, CO Combined Statistical Area
- Front Range Urban Corridor
