= Fort Reynolds (Colorado) =

American Army post in Colorado

Coordinates: 38°13′50″N 104°18′12″W

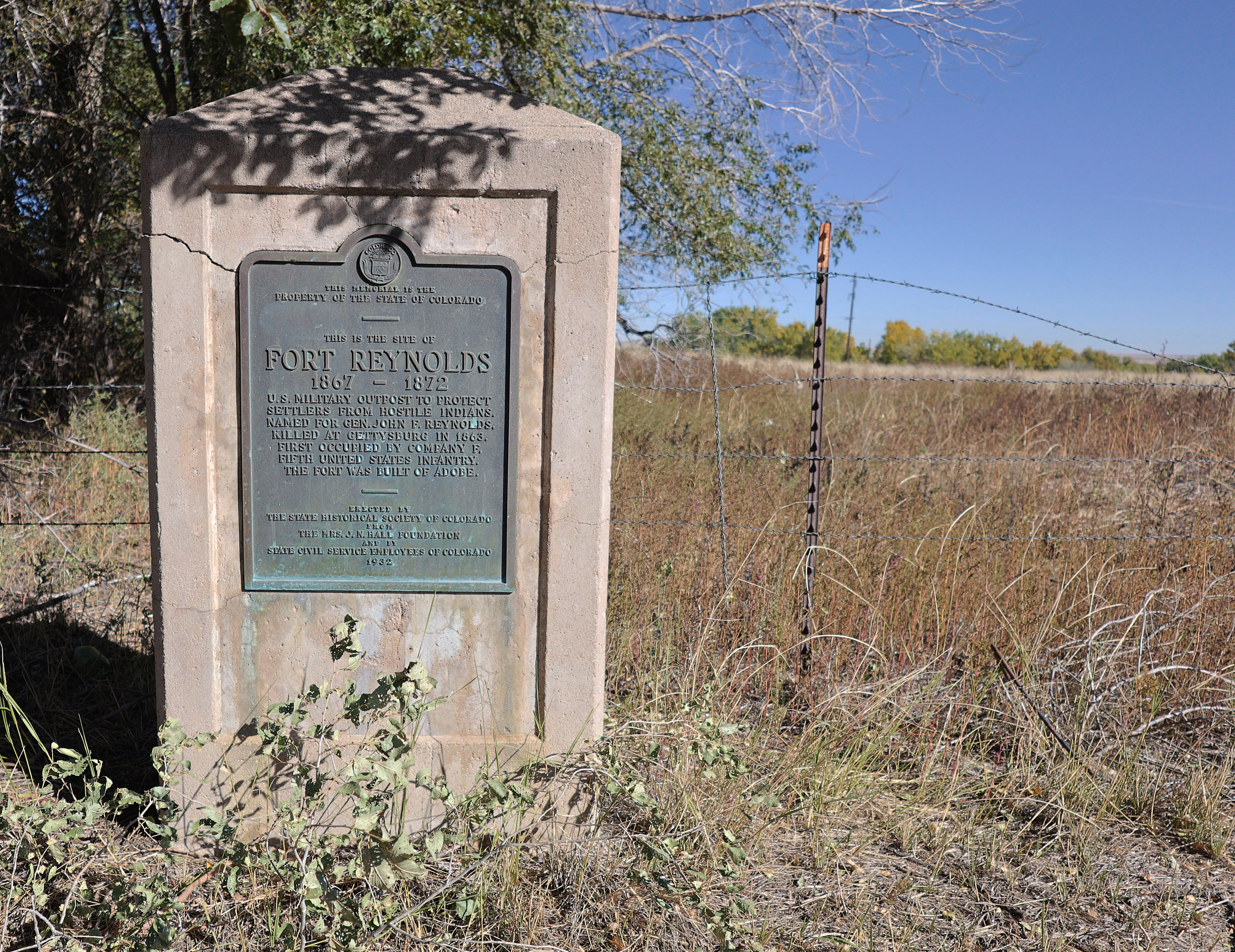
Historical marker along Highway 50

Fort Reynolds was a United States Army post near Avondale, Colorado, during the Indian Wars and the Civil War. The site is about 20 miles (32 km) east of Pueblo, Colorado.

Construction began in 1867 on the 23-square-mile military reservation, which was named for John F. Reynolds. He attended West Point and was killed at the Battle of Gettysburg. Facilities included barracks, a mess hall, a hospital, a guardhouse, a store-house, a laundry, a corral, a supply depot, and parade grounds. Fort Lyon, which lies 60 miles (97 km) east of Fort Reynolds was closer to the skirmishes with Native Americans, so Fort Reynolds became a supply post, staffed with about 100 soldiers. In January 1868, soldiers were called from Fort Lyon and Fort Reynolds to manage citizen unrest in Trinidad, Colorado, that began with a drunken brawl. That was the extent of the action seen by the Fort Reynolds post. It closed in 1872.

In the 1930s, the site had remnants of camp life, including cooking utensils, weapons, buttons, and other items. A stone marker is located on US-50 at mile marker 333, about one mile east of Avondale.
