= Kersey, Colorado =

Town in Weld County, Colorado, United States

- Statutory Town
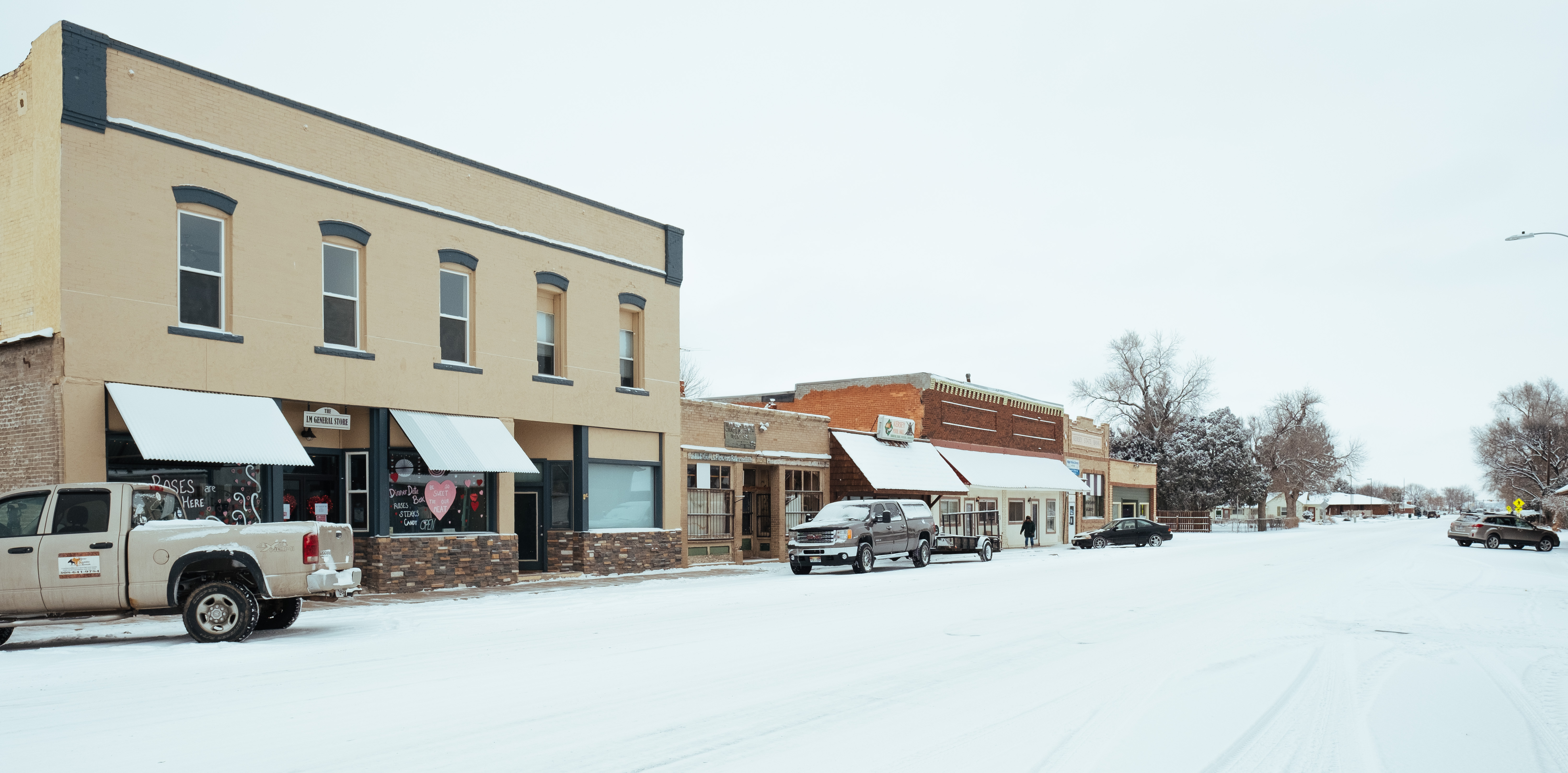
- Kersey, February 2018

- Location of Kersey in Weld County, Colorado.
- Coordinates: 40°23′39″N 104°35′41″W
- Country: United States
- State: Colorado
- County: Weld
- Incorporated (town): December 3, 1908

Government
  - Type: Statutory Town

Area
  - Total: 2.03 sq mi (5.25 km^{2})
  - Land: 2.02 sq mi (5.24 km^{2})
  - Water: 0.0039 sq mi (0.01 km^{2})
- Elevation: 4,623 ft (1,409 m)

Population (2020)
  - Total: 1,495
  - Density: 739/sq mi (285/km^{2})
- Time zone: UTC-7 (Mountain (MST))
  - Summer (DST): UTC-6 (MDT)
- ZIP code: 80644
- Area code: 970
- FIPS code: 08-40515
- GNIS feature ID: 2412828
- Website: www.kerseygov.com

The Town of Kersey is a Statutory Town in Weld County, Colorado, United States. The population was 1,495 at the 2020 United States census.

== History ==
Elbridge Gerry established a trading post called Fort Gerry on the South Platte River near the present-day town of Kersey, Colorado in the 1830s. He had two Native American wives who helped him run the post. In 1840, Gerry abandoned the site and built a post on the south bank of the river. Gerry is said to be the first white man to settle in what is now Weld County.

A post office called Kersey has been in operation since 1894. A railroad official gave Kersey the maiden name of his mother.

== Geography ==
According to the United States Census Bureau, the town has a total area of 1.0 square mile (2.6 km^{2}), all of it land.

== Demographics ==
Historical population
Census	Pop.	Note	%±
1910	304		—
1920	319		4.9%
1930	307		−3.8%
1940	268		−12.7%
1950	304		13.4%
1960	378		24.3%
1970	474		25.4%
1980	913		92.6%
1990	863		−5.5%
2000	1,406		62.9%
2010	1,454		3.4%
2020	1,495		2.8%

=== 2020 census ===
As of the 2020 census, Kersey had a population of 1,495. The median age was 32.8 years. 28.2% of residents were under the age of 18 and 11.9% of residents were 65 years of age or older. For every 100 females there were 95.4 males, and for every 100 females age 18 and over there were 92.1 males age 18 and over.

0.0% of residents lived in urban areas, while 100.0% lived in rural areas.

There were 528 households in Kersey, of which 44.7% had children under the age of 18 living in them. Of all households, 52.5% were married-couple households, 15.7% were households with a male householder and no spouse or partner present, and 25.9% were households with a female householder and no spouse or partner present. About 21.5% of all households were made up of individuals and 8.1% had someone living alone who was 65 years of age or older.

There were 552 housing units, of which 4.3% were vacant. The homeowner vacancy rate was 1.0% and the rental vacancy rate was 1.9%.

Racial composition as of the 2020 census
Race	Number	Percent
White	1,123	75.1%
Black or African American	2	0.1%
American Indian and Alaska Native	35	2.3%
Asian	2	0.1%
Native Hawaiian and Other Pacific Islander	0	0.0%
Some other race	148	9.9%
Two or more races	185	12.4%
Hispanic or Latino (of any race)	458	30.6%

== See also ==
- List of municipalities in Colorado
- Greeley, CO Metropolitan Statistical Area
