= Milk Fort =

- Trading post and fort
- Nicknames: Fort Leche, Pueblo de Leche, Fort El Puebla, Peebles Fort, Fort Independence
- Country: United States
- State: Colorado
- County: Otero
- Town: La Junta

Milk Fort, also known as Fort Leche, Pueblo de Leche, Fort El Puebla, Peebles Fort, and Fort Independence was a trading post and settlement in Otero County, Colorado in the late 1830s. There are no remains of the settlement.

== History ==
In September 1839, Frederick Adolphus Wislizenus established a fort 4 or 5 miles (6.4 or 8.0 km) upstream of Bent's Old Fort that he called Peebles Fort. It was located on the Arkansas River on what is now the eastern edge of La Junta, Colorado. The adobe fort was built with 30 interior rooms that lined the walls with a central courtyard. Each of the 12-foot square rooms had a corner fireplace. Commonly called Milk Fort, Fort Leche, or El Pueblo, it was inhabited by people of Spanish, Native American, and French heritage. Its name, Milk Fort or Fort Leche, comes from the goat's milk consumed by the forts inhabitants, which included well-groomed women, "ferocious" looking men, and many children. Some of the men were retired trappers. The animals included buffalo calves, goats, dogs, cats, jackasses, and raccoons. Crops and livestock were raised at the settlement, which may have lasted just a year or two.
