= Ione, Colorado =

Unincorporated community in Weld County, CO, USA

Coordinates: 40°08′56″N 104°48′39″W

Ione is an unincorporated community in Weld County, Colorado.

== History ==
A post office called Ione was established in 1927, and remained in operation until 1958. Tradition states the name "Ione" is a phonetic spelling of "I own (it)", a favorite saying of the original owner of the town site, W. A. Davis.
