= Fort Saint Vrain =

- Trading post and fort
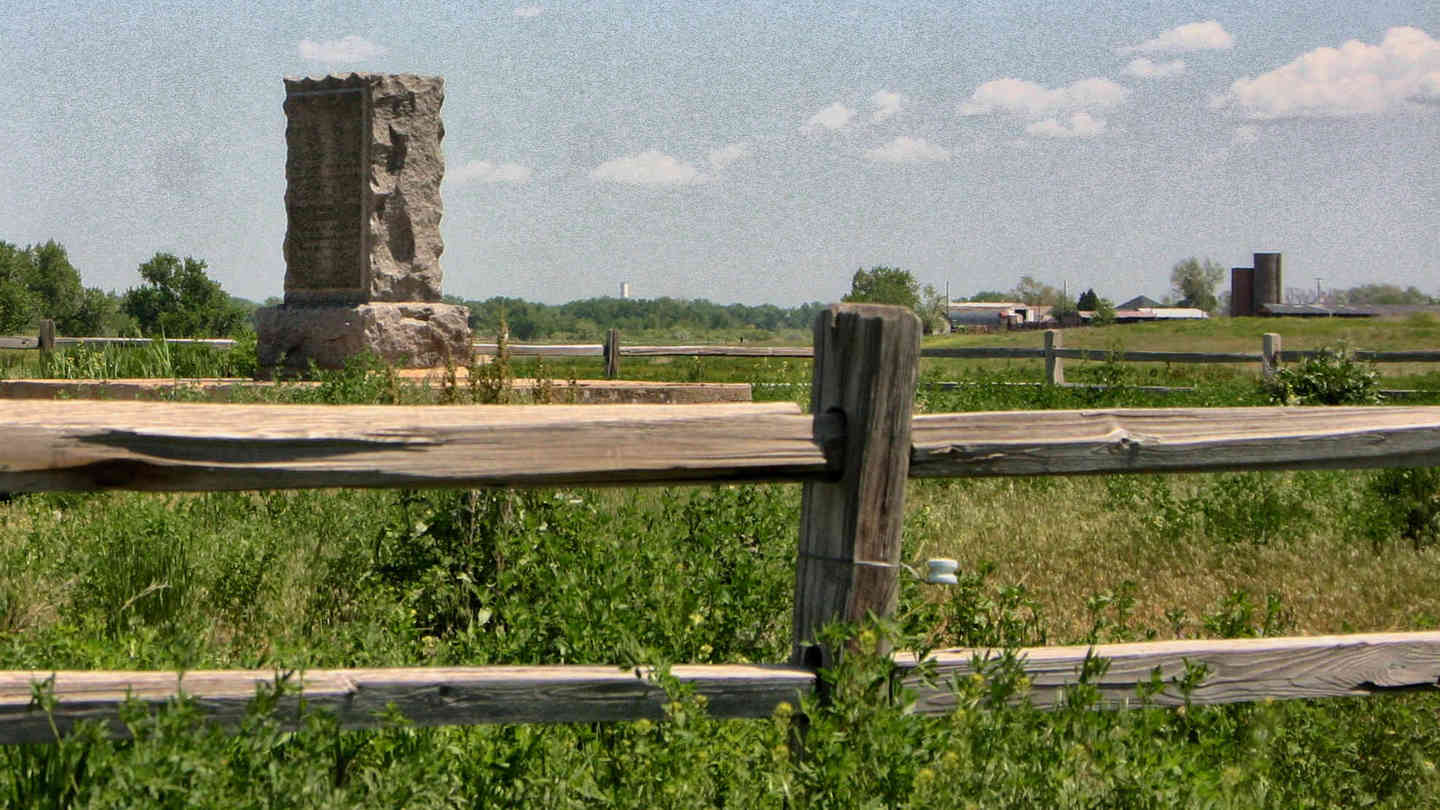
- Historical marker at the site of Fort Saint Vrain
- Nicknames: Fort George, Fort Lookout
- Location within Colorado Location within the United States
- Coordinates: 40°16′44″N 104°51′18″W
- Country: United States
- State: Colorado
- County: Weld
- Nearest town: Platteville
- Named for: Ceran St. Vrain
- Elevation (Note: Elevation from the Geographic Names Information System.): 4,764 ft (1,452 m)

Fort Saint Vrain was an 1837 fur trading post built by the Bent, St. Vrain Company, and located at the confluence of Saint Vrain Creek and the South Platte River, about 20 miles (32 km) east of the Rocky Mountains in the unorganized territory of the United States, in present-day Weld County, Colorado. A historical marker notes the place where Old Fort St. Vrain once stood, today at the end of Weld County Road 40, located about seven miles north of Fort Vasquez, Colorado. Among those who helped to establish the fort was Ceran St. Vrain, after whom it was named.

William Clark, governor of the territory, granted the Bent, St. Vrain Co. a license to trade on November 8, 1836. Like neighboring forts, the structure was built as a two-story adobe structure whose walls encased an interior courtyard. It accommodated trade with Native American tribes and mountain men engaged in fur trapping. It resembled the adobe building and plaza reconstructed at Fort Vasquez and Bent's Old Fort.

Marcellin St. Vrain, Ceran's brother, managed the trading post. He employed such notable people as James Beckwourth, a mountain man, and Jean Baptiste Charbonneau, who was born to Sacajewea during the 1804-1806 Lewis and Clark Expedition. She accompanied the expedition with her husband, trader & trapper Toussaint Charbonneau as well as newborn Jean Baptiste, while filling the crucial role of translator to the Shoshone Indian tribe.

After the Taos Revolt in 1847, the St. Vrain brothers both returned to St. Louis. After Ceran St. Vrain sold his shares of the Bent, St. Vrain Co., William Bent became sole proprietor by 1849. Bent moved to Fort St. Vrain temporarily before building a new Fort Bent in the Big Timbers area.

== See also ==
- List of ghost towns in Colorado
