= Fort Vasquez =

- U.S. National Register of Historic Places
- Colorado State Register of Historic Properties
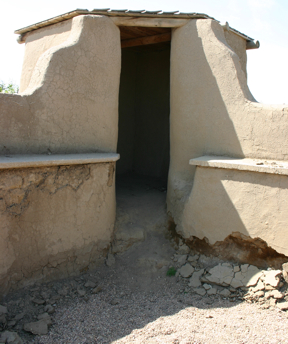
- Structure in Fort Vasquez

- Location within Colorado Location within the United States
- Location: Platteville, Colorado
- Coordinates: 40°11′40″N 104°49′13″W
- Area: 1 acre (0.40 ha)
- Built: 1835
- Architect: Works Progress Administration (reconstruction)
- Architectural style: adobe fort
- NRHP reference No.: 70000169
- CSRHP No.: 5WL.568
- Added to NRHP: September 30, 1970

Fort Vasquez is a former fur trading post 35 miles (56 km) northeast of Denver, Colorado, United States, founded by Louis Vasquez and Andrew Sublette in 1835. Restored by the Works Progress Administration in the 1930s, it now lies in a rather incongruous position as U.S. Route 85 splits to run either side of the building. History Colorado (then the Colorado Historical Society) took possession of the property in 1958 and runs it as a museum to display exhibits of the fur-trade era.

== History ==
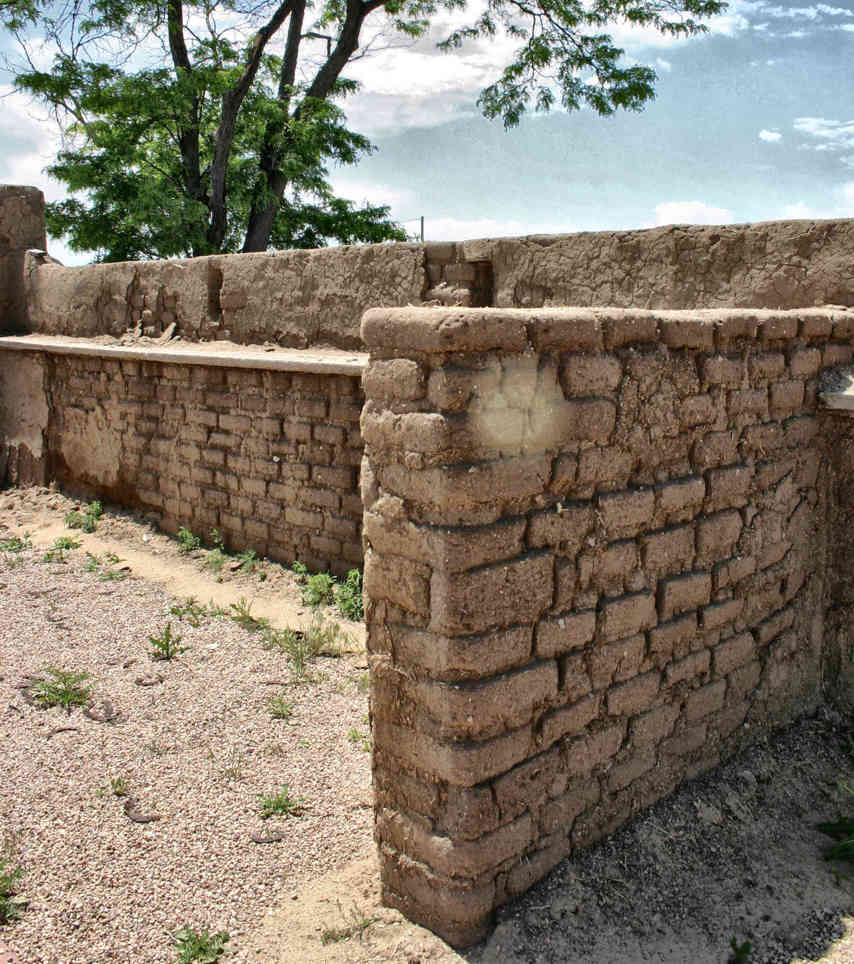
Wall inside Fort Vasquez

After building a temporary trading post called Fort Convenience on the South Platte River and Clear Creek in 1834, Vasquez established Fort Vasquez with Sublette. The present day Fort Vasquez located on Highway 85, next to Platteville, Colorado is a reconstruction of the adobe trading post established by the trappers Louis Vasquez and Andrew Sublette. They built the fort in 1835 after obtaining a trading license in St. Louis, Missouri, from William Clark, the Superintendent of Indian Affairs.

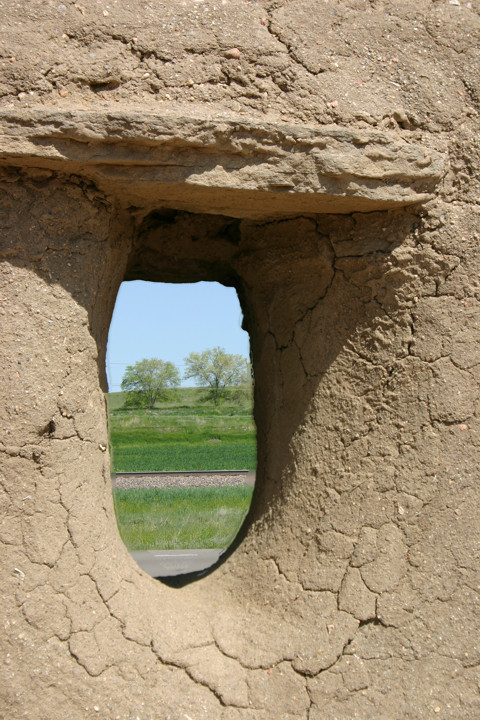

They traded with other furriers, trappers, mountain men, and Native American tribes (including the Arapaho and Cheyenne), amidst competition with other trading posts. Unable to turn a profit, they sold Fort Vasquez to Lock and Randolph in 1840 who subsequently went bankrupt and abandoned the structures in 1842. Due to the bankruptcy, Vasquez and Sublette could not collect the sum owed to them for the sale. The Census of 1880 lists several residents of Vasquez Fork, and it appears to be a mining community. One resident was Othello Reed Ostrander, born 1843 in New York. The census taker lists him as being in Vasquez Fork AND living in Georgetown with his wife and two young sons. He was listed twice. His wife was Isabelle Irene and sons were Arthur and Albert.

The fort was almost demolished during the construction of US Route 85. It was saved, in part, due to the efforts of local resident Fern Miller, who would later become Superintendent of the Denver Mint.

== See also ==
- List of forts in Colorado

== Other sources ==
- Lecompte, Janet (1978). Pueblo, Hardscrabble, Greenhorn: Society on the High Plains, 1832–1856. Norman, Oklahoma: University of Oklahoma Press. ISBN 0-8061-1723-0.
- Noel, Thomas J.; Faulkner, Debra B. (2006). Colorado: An Illustrated History of the Highest State. Sun Valley, California: American Historical Press. ISBN 978-1-892724-52-6.
- Brotemarkle, Diane (2001). Old Fort St. Vrain. Boulder, Colorado: Johnson Printing. ISBN 0-9712372-0-4.
