= List of populated places in Colorado: P–Z =

The location of the State of Colorado in the United States of America.

The 64 counties of the U.S. State of Colorado

See also the List of populated places in Colorado by county.

This is a list of more than 3,800 currently, or formerly, inhabited places in the U.S. State of Colorado. (Note: This list includes 1913 Colorado places selectively downloaded from the Geographic Names Information System on October 15, 2023.)
Currently inhabited places in Colorado include the:

- 273 municipalities from the List of municipalities in Colorado
- 210 census-designated places from the List of census-designated places in Colorado
- 64 counties from the List of counties in Colorado.
- 8 military bases from the List of military installations in Colorado
- 2 Native American reservations from the List of Native American reservations in Colorado

This list also includes the current and extinct populated places found in the:

- Geographic Names Information System
- United States Geological Survey historic trail maps
- List of county seats in Colorado
- List of forts in Colorado
- List of ghost towns in Colorado
- List of National Register of Historic Places in Colorado
- List of post offices in Colorado
- List of trading posts in Colorado

- For important dates associated with many of these places, please see the List of municipalities in Colorado and the List of post offices in Colorado.
- For the ZIP Codes for many of these places, please see the List of post offices in Colorado.
- For the telephone area codes for many of these places, please see the List of Colorado telephone area codes.
- For all federally recognized place names in Colorado, please see the Geographic Names Information System.

| | County |
| † | County seat |
| ‡ | Former county seat |
| # | State capital |
| ⁂ | Former territorial capital |

Colorado populated places: A B C D E F G H I J K L M N O P Q R S T U V W X Y Z

== A–F ==
- List of populated places in Colorado: A through F

== G–O ==
- List of populated places in Colorado: G through O

== P ==
Select the OpenStreetMap link at the right to view the location of places in this section.

| Place | County | Type | Location | Elevation |
|---|---|---|---|---|
| Pacific | El Paso | former post office | | |
| Pactolus | Gilpin | unincorporated community | 39.9178°N 105.4644°W | 8,212 feet (2,503 m) |
| Padroni | Logan | census-designated place | 40.7778°N 103.1727°W | 3,999 feet (1,219 m) |
| Pagoda | Routt | unincorporated community | 40.3369°N 107.4159°W | 6,549 feet (1,996 m) |
| Pagosa Junction | Archuleta | ghost town | 37.0381°N 107.1992°W | 6,266 feet (1,910 m) |
| Pagosa Springs† (Note: Pagosa Springs has been the seat of Archuleta County, Colorado since the county was created on April 14, 1885.) | Archuleta | home rule town | 37.2695°N 107.0098°W | 7,126 feet (2,172 m) |
| Paige City | Summit | see Lincoln | | |
| Paisaje | Conejos | unincorporated community | 37.0678°N 106.0606°W | 7,999 feet (2,438 m) |
| Palisade | Mesa | statutory town | 39.1103°N 108.3509°W | 4,728 feet (1,441 m) |
| Palisades | Mesa | see Palisade | | |
| Pallas | Routt | former post office | | |
| Palmer | El Paso | see Palmer Lake | | |
| Palmer | Fremont | see Coaldale | | |
| Palmer Lake | El Paso | statutory town | 39.1222°N 104.9172°W | 7,297 feet (2,224 m) |
| Palos Verdes | Arapahoe | Centennial neighborhood | 39.6058°N 104.9183°W | 5,614 feet (1,711 m) |
| Pando | Eagle | ghost town | 39.4572°N 106.3336°W | 9,203 feet (2,805 m) |
| Pandora | San Miguel | ghost town | 37.9333°N 107.7856°W | 8,953 feet (2,729 m) |
| Panorama Heights | Jefferson | unincorporated community | 39.7222°N 105.2403°W | 7,349 feet (2,240 m) |
| Paoli | Phillips | statutory town | 40.6122°N 102.4727°W | 3,894 feet (1,187 m) |
| Paonia | Delta | statutory town | 38.8683°N 107.5920°W | 5,682 feet (1,732 m) |
| Papeton | El Paso | Colorado Springs neighborhood | 38.8764°N 104.8019°W | 6,184 feet (1,885 m) |
| Parachute | Garfield | home rule town | 39.4519°N 108.0529°W | 5,092 feet (1,552 m) |
| Paradise Acres | Jefferson | Arvada neighborhood | 39.8289°N 105.1006°W | 5,577 feet (1,700 m) |
| Paradise Hills | Jefferson | unincorporated community | 39.7125°N 105.2517°W | 7,421 feet (2,262 m) |
| Paradox | Montrose | unincorporated community | 38.3683°N 108.9623°W | 5,299 feet (1,615 m) |
| Paragon Estates | Boulder | census-designated place | 39.9802°N 105.1813°W | 5,440 feet (1,658 m) |
| Paramount Heights | Jefferson | Wheat Ridge neighborhood | 39.7578°N 105.1142°W | 5,591 feet (1,704 m) |
| Pargin | La Plata | former post office | | |
| Park Center | Fremont | census-designated place | 38.4778°N 105.2061°W | 5,561 feet (1,695 m) |
| Park City | Lake | see Adelaide, Lake County | | |
| Park City | Park | ghost town | 39.2783°N 106.0931°W | 10,499 feet (3,200 m) |
| Park County | | county | 39.1188°N 105.7171°W | |
| Park East | Arapahoe | Aurora neighborhood | 39.7217°N 104.8531°W | 5,443 feet (1,659 m) |
| Park Hill | Denver | Denver neighborhood | | |
| Park Meadows | Douglas | Lone Tree neighborhood | 39.5629°N 104.8763°W | 5,860 feet (1,786 m) |
| Park Siding | Jefferson | see Foxton | | |
| Park Slope | Jefferson | Arvada neighborhood | 39.7933°N 105.0908°W | 5,325 feet (1,623 m) |
| Park View | Arapahoe | Centennial neighborhood | 39.6128°N 104.7497°W | 5,899 feet (1,798 m) |
| Park View Estates | Arapahoe | Aurora neighborhood | 39.7217°N 104.8333°W | 5,449 feet (1,661 m) |
| Parkborough | Arapahoe | Centennial neighborhood | 39.6114°N 104.7397°W | 5,889 feet (1,795 m) |
| Parkdale | Fremont | unincorporated community | | |
| Parker | Douglas | home rule town | 39.5186°N 104.7614°W | 5,869 feet (1,789 m) |
| Parker Highlands | Elbert | unincorporated community | 39.4714°N 104.6506°W | 6,434 feet (1,961 m) |
| Parkville | Saguache | unincorporated community | 38.2272°N 106.1006°W | 8,720 feet (2,658 m) |
| Parkville‡ (Note: On November 1, 1861, the Territory of Colorado created 17 original counties, with Parkville as the original seat of Summit County, Colorado Territory. Parkville served as county seat until the following year.) | Summit | ghost town | 39.4989°N 105.9500°W | 9,980 feet (3,042 m) |
| Parkway Estates | Jefferson | Arvada neighborhood | 39.8369°N 105.0761°W | 5,453 feet (1,662 m) |
| Parlin | Gunnison | unincorporated community | 38.5028°N 106.7284°W | 7,933 feet (2,418 m) |
| Parras Plaza | Las Animas | unincorporated community | 37.1772°N 104.9564°W | 7,487 feet (2,282 m) |
| Parrish | Prowers | unincorporated community | 38.1217°N 102.3846°W | 3,596 feet (1,096 m) |
| Parrott | La Plata | see Mayday | | |
| Parrott City‡ (Note: On January 31, 1876, county voters selected Parrott City as the new seat of La Plata County, Colorado Territory, and after statehood on August 1, 1876, the seat of La Plata County, Colorado until 1881.) | La Plata | see Mayday | | |
| Parshall | Grand | census-designated place | 40.0556°N 106.1760°W | 7,585 feet (2,312 m) |
| Patches | Las Animas | former post office | | |
| Patt | Las Animas | former post office | | |
| Pauley | Huerfano | former post office | | |
| Paulus | Jackson | former post office | | |
| Pawnee | Morgan | see Union | | |
| Pawnee Hills | Elbert | unincorporated community | 39.3931°N 104.6383°W | 6,558 feet (1,999 m) |
| Paxton | Montrose | former post office | | |
| Paymaster | Montezuma | former post office | | |
| Payne | Delta | unincorporated community | 38.8017°N 107.9020°W | 5,279 feet (1,609 m) |
| Pea Green Corner | Montrose | unincorporated community | 38.6500°N 108.0951°W | 5,308 feet (1,618 m) |
| Peabodys | Park | unincorporated community | 39.3480°N 105.9272°W | 10,154 feet (3,095 m) |
| Peaceful Valley | Boulder | unincorporated community | 40.1314°N 105.4978°W | 8,435 feet (2,571 m) |
| Peach Blow | Eagle | see Sloss | | |
| Peachblow | Eagle | see Sloss | | |
| Peak Seven West | Summit | unincorporated community | 39.5000°N 106.0638°W | 9,895 feet (3,016 m) |
| Pear Park | Mesa | unincorporated community | 39.0703°N 108.4720°W | 4,646 feet (1,416 m) |
| Pearl | Jackson | ghost town | 40.9852°N 106.5470°W | 8,406 feet (2,562 m) |
| Pearmont | Grand | former post office | | |
| Peckham | Weld | unincorporated community | 40.3039°N 104.7511°W | 4,731 feet (1,442 m) |
| Peconic | Kit Carson | unincorporated community | 39.3208°N 102.1488°W | 4,009 feet (1,222 m) |
| Peebles Fort | Otero | see Milk Fort | | |
| Peeples | Delta | unincorporated community | 38.8219°N 108.3417°W | 4,780 feet (1,457 m) |
| Peetz | Logan | statutory town | 40.9628°N 103.1124°W | 4,432 feet (1,351 m) |
| Pella | Grand | former post office | | |
| Pemberton | Douglas | see Westcreek | | |
| Peneold | Jackson | see Gould | | |
| Penn | Boulder | former post office | | |
| Penrose | Fremont | census-designated place | 38.4250°N 105.0228°W | 5,335 feet (1,626 m) |
| Peoria | Arapahoe | census-designated place | 39.6649°N 104.1456°W | 5,272 feet (1,607 m) |
| Peoria Park | Arapahoe | Aurora neighborhood | 39.6789°N 104.8519°W | 5,577 feet (1,700 m) |
| Perigo | Gilpin | ghost town | 39.8792°N 105.5308°W | 9,639 feet (2,938 m) |
| Perin | La Plata | see Perins | | |
| Perin | La Plata | former post office | | |
| Perl-Mack | Adams | former post office | | |
| Perry | Douglas | former post office | | |
| Perry | Rio Grande | former post office | | |
| Perry Park | Douglas | census-designated place | 39.2567°N 104.9925°W | 6,467 feet (1,971 m) |
| Pershing | Routt | see Crater | | |
| Petersburg | Arapahoe | former post office | | |
| Peterson Army Air Field | El Paso | historic U.S. Army air field | 38.8128°N 104.7100°W | 6,119 feet (1,865 m) |
| Peterson Space Force Base | El Paso | U.S. Space Force | | |
| Petra | Larimer | see Stout | | |
| Peyton | El Paso | census-designated place | 39.0330°N 104.4904°W | 6,877 feet (2,096 m) |
| Pheasant Run | Arapahoe | Aurora neighborhood | 39.6361°N 104.8128°W | 5,758 feet (1,755 m) |
| Phillips County | | county | 40.5939°N 102.3576°W | |
| Phillipsburg | Jefferson | census-designated place | 39.5383°N 105.1869°W | 6,585 feet (2,007 m) |
| Phippsburg | Routt | census-designated place | | |
| Phoenix | Gilpin | ghost town | 39.9286°N 105.5356°W | 9,170 feet (2,795 m) |
| Piceance | Rio Blanco | former post office | | |
| Pictou | Huerfano | unincorporated community | 37.6386°N 104.8136°W | 6,280 feet (1,914 m) |
| Piedmont | Las Animas | unincorporated community | 37.1378°N 104.5519°W | 6,234 feet (1,900 m) |
| Piedra | Archuleta | census-designated place | 37.2236°N 107.3409°W | 6,572 feet (2,003 m) |
| Piedra | Hinsdale | census-designated place | | |
| Pieplant | Gunnison | former post office | | |
| Pieplant Mill | Gunnison | ghost town | 38.9380°N 106.5595°W | 10,308 feet (3,142 m) |
| Pierce | Weld | statutory town | 40.6355°N 104.7552°W | 5,036 feet (1,535 m) |
| Pike's Stockade | Conejos | historic encampment | | |
| Pike-San Isabel Village | Park | unincorporated community | 39.0519°N 105.7206°W | 8,983 feet (2,738 m) |
| Pikeview | El Paso | Colorado Springs neighborhood | 38.9153°N 104.8222°W | 6,247 feet (1,904 m) |
| Pilot | Cheyenne | former post office | | |
| Pine | Jefferson | unincorporated community | | |
| Pine Bluff | Mesa | former post office | | |
| Pine Brook Hill | Boulder | census-designated place | 40.0500°N 105.3147°W | 6,414 feet (1,955 m) |
| Pine Crest | El Paso | Palmer Lake neighborhood | 39.1125°N 104.9083°W | 7,103 feet (2,165 m) |
| Pine Grove | Douglas | see Parker | | |
| Pine Grove | Jefferson | unincorporated community | 39.4100°N 105.3239°W | 6,818 feet (2,078 m) |
| Pine Junction | Jefferson | unincorporated community | 39.4661°N 105.3958°W | 8,448 feet (2,575 m) |
| Pine Nook | Douglas | unincorporated community | 39.3842°N 105.0714°W | 7,346 feet (2,239 m) |
| Pine River | La Plata | see Pineriver | | |
| Pine Valley | Boulder | unincorporated community | 40.1917°N 105.4831°W | 8,281 feet (2,524 m) |
| Pine Valley | Clear Creek | census-designated place | 39.6928°N 105.4107°W | 8,412 feet (2,564 m) |
| Pine Valley | Douglas | unincorporated community | 39.5256°N 104.7417°W | 6,033 feet (1,839 m) |
| Pinecliffe | Gilpin | unincorporated community | 39.9319°N 105.4283°W | 8,012 feet (2,442 m) |
| Pinecliffe | Boulder | unincorporated community | 39.9319°N 105.4283°W | 8,012 feet (2,442 m) |
| Pineriver | La Plata | former post office | | |
| Pinewood | Larimer | former post office | | |
| Pinewood Springs | Larimer | unincorporated community | 40.2733°N 105.3567°W | 6,696 feet (2,041 m) |
| Piney Creek | Arapahoe | Centennial neighborhood | 39.6175°N 104.7917°W | 5,771 feet (1,759 m) |
| Piney Creek Ranches | Arapahoe | Centennial neighborhood | 39.5983°N 104.7647°W | 5,771 feet (1,759 m) |
| Pinkhamton | Larimer | former post office | | |
| Pinnacle | Bent | former post office | | |
| Pinnacle | Routt | former post office | | |
| Pinneo | Washington | ghost town | 40.2094°N 103.4386°W | 4,364 feet (1,330 m) |
| Piñon | Montrose | unincorporated community | 38.2667°N 108.4006°W | 5,846 feet (1,782 m) |
| Piñon | Pueblo | unincorporated community | 38.4333°N 104.6075°W | 5,013 feet (1,528 m) |
| Piñon Acres | La Plata | unincorporated community | 37.2278°N 107.8173°W | 6,795 feet (2,071 m) |
| Pioneer Mobile Gardens | Adams | unincorporated community | | |
| Pitkin | Gunnison | statutory town | 38.6092°N 106.5167°W | 9,216 feet (2,809 m) |
| Pitkin County | | county | 39.2172°N 106.9165°W | |
| Pittsburg | Gunnison | ghost town | 38.9522°N 107.0625°W | 9,278 feet (2,828 m) |
| Placer | Costilla | see Russell | | |
| Placerville | San Miguel | census-designated place | 38.0167°N 108.0534°W | 7,316 feet (2,230 m) |
| Placita | Pitkin | unincorporated community | 39.1322°N 107.2628°W | 7,448 feet (2,270 m) |
| Plain | Summit | see Lakeside, Summit County | | |
| Plains | Prowers | former post office | | |
| Plainview | Jefferson | unincorporated community | 39.8936°N 105.2764°W | 6,798 feet (2,072 m) |
| Plateau | Mesa | former post office | | |
| Plateau City | Mesa | unincorporated community | 39.2372°N 107.9817°W | 5,965 feet (1,818 m) |
| Platner | Washington | unincorporated community | 40.1553°N 103.0674°W | 4,432 feet (1,351 m) |
| Platoro | Conejos | unincorporated community | 37.3520°N 106.5328°W | 9,843 feet (3,000 m) |
| Platte | Park | see Platte Station | | |
| Platte Cañon | Douglas | former post office | | |
| Platte Cañon | Jefferson | see Waterton | | |
| Platte Park | Denver | Denver neighborhood | | |
| Platte Springs | Park | unincorporated community | 39.0636°N 105.3586°W | 8,376 feet (2,553 m) |
| Platte Station | Park | former post office | | |
| Platte Valley | Weld | see Hardin | | |
| Platteville | Weld | statutory town | 40.2150°N 104.8227°W | 4,813 feet (1,467 m) |
| Pleasant Valley | Fremont | see Howard | | |
| Pleasant View | Jefferson | unincorporated community | 39.7342°N 105.1717°W | 5,771 feet (1,759 m) |
| Pleasant View | Montezuma | unincorporated community | 37.5894°N 108.7651°W | 6,913 feet (2,107 m) |
| Pleasant View Ridge | Boulder | unincorporated community | 40.1167°N 105.0555°W | 4,997 feet (1,523 m) |
| Pleasanton | Fremont | unincorporated community | 38.3650°N 105.7478°W | 6,486 feet (1,977 m) |
| Plum | Douglas | see Sedalia | | |
| Plum Bush | Washington | former post office | | |
| Plum Station | Douglas | see Sedalia | | |
| Plum Valley | Las Animas | former post office | | |
| Plumbs | Weld | unincorporated community | 40.0878°N 105.0439°W | 4,961 feet (1,512 m) |
| Plumer | Ouray | former post office | | |
| Point Lookout | Montezuma | former post office | | |
| Point of Rocks | Huerfano | former post office | | |
| Point Sublime | El Paso | see Sublime | | |
| Poncha Springs | Chaffee | statutory town | 38.5128°N 106.0772°W | 7,470 feet (2,277 m) |
| Poncho Springs | Chaffee | see Poncha Springs | | |
| Ponderosa East | Douglas | unincorporated community | 39.5461°N 104.6705°W | 6,257 feet (1,907 m) |
| Ponderosa Hills | Douglas | unincorporated community | 39.5447°N 104.7319°W | 6,119 feet (1,865 m) |
| Ponderosa Park | Elbert | census-designated place | 39.4083°N 104.6511°W | 6,683 feet (2,037 m) |
| Pony Estates | Boulder | unincorporated community | | |
| Pool | Routt | see Milner | | |
| Porter | La Plata | former post office | | |
| Portland | Fremont | census-designated place | 38.3911°N 105.0250°W | 5,043 feet (1,537 m) |
| Portland | Ouray | census-designated place | | |
| Post at Julesburg | Sedgwick | see Fort Sedgwick | | |
| Poudre City | Larimer | ghost town | | |
| Poudre Park | Larimer | unincorporated community | 40.6861°N 105.3047°W | 5,679 feet (1,731 m) |
| Poughkeepsie | San Juan | former post office | | |
| Powars | Weld | unincorporated community | 40.0408°N 104.8080°W | 4,944 feet (1,507 m) |
| Powder Wash | Moffat | unincorporated community | 40.9458°N 108.3115°W | 6,722 feet (2,049 m) |
| Powderhorn | Gunnison | unincorporated community | 38.2769°N 107.0959°W | 8,097 feet (2,468 m) |
| Powell | Las Animas | former post office | | |
| Prairie | Washington | former post office | | |
| Prairie Trail Ranches | Elbert | unincorporated community | 39.4697°N 104.6322°W | 6,385 feet (1,946 m) |
| Preston | Summit | ghost town | 39.4958°N 106.0211°W | 10,371 feet (3,161 m) |
| Price | Archuleta | former post office | | |
| Price Creek | Moffat | former post office | | |
| Prichett | Baca | see Pritchett | | |
| Pride | Baca | former post office | | |
| Primero | Las Animas | ghost town | 37.1425°N 104.7417°W | 6,814 feet (2,077 m) |
| Primos | Boulder | former post office | | |
| Princeton | Chaffee | unincorporated community | 38.9933°N 106.2200°W | 8,638 feet (2,633 m) |
| Pritchett | Baca | statutory town | 37.3703°N 102.8596°W | 4,833 feet (1,473 m) |
| Proctor | Logan | ghost town | 40.8069°N 102.9516°W | 3,780 feet (1,152 m) |
| Progress | Baca | former post office | | |
| Prospect | Boulder | Longmont neighborhood | | |
| Prospect | Gunnison | former post office | | |
| Prospect Heights | Fremont | Cañon City neighborhood | 38.4264°N 105.2375°W | 5,433 feet (1,656 m) |
| Prospect Valley | Weld | unincorporated community | 40.0736°N 104.4150°W | 4,846 feet (1,477 m) |
| Providence | Gunnison | former post office | | |
| Prowers | Bent | unincorporated community | 38.0820°N 102.7677°W | 3,691 feet (1,125 m) |
| Prowers County | | county | 37.9549°N 102.3934°W | |
| Pruden | Saguache | former post office | | |
| Pryor | Huerfano | unincorporated community | 37.5081°N 104.7142°W | 6,421 feet (1,957 m) |
| Pueblo† (Note: On November 28, 1859, the Provisional Government of the Territory of Jefferson created 12 counties, with Pueblo as the seat of Fountain County, Jefferson Territory. On November 1, 1861, the new Territory of Colorado created 17 original counties, with Pueblo as the seat of Pueblo County, Colorado Territory, and since statehood on August 1, 1876, the seat of Pueblo County, Colorado.) | Pueblo | home rule city | 38.2544°N 104.6091°W | 4,692 feet (1,430 m) |
| Pueblo Army Air Base | Pueblo | historic U.S. Army air base | 38.2939°N 104.4992°W | 4,689 feet (1,429 m) |
| Pueblo Chemical Depot | Pueblo | Former U.S. Army depot | | |
| Pueblo County | | county | 38.1732°N 104.5128°W | |
| Pueblo de Leche | Otero | see Milk Fort | | |
| Pueblo West | Pueblo | census-designated place | 38.3500°N 104.7228°W | 5,066 feet (1,544 m) |
| Pulaski | Las Animas | former post office | | |
| Pullen | Larimer | former post office | | |
| Pultney | Crowley | unincorporated community | 38.1622°N 104.0477°W | 4,383 feet (1,336 m) |
| Puma | Routt | see Trull | | |
| Puma City | Park | see Tarryall (founded 1896) | | |
| Punkin Center | Lincoln | unincorporated community | 38.8519°N 103.7005°W | 5,364 feet (1,635 m) |
| Purcell | Weld | ghost town | 40.6383°N 104.6016°W | 5,023 feet (1,531 m) |
| Puritan | Weld | unincorporated community | 40.0850°N 104.9991°W | 5,023 feet (1,531 m) |
| Puzzler | Boulder | former post office | | |
| Pyke | Saguache | former post office | | |
| Pyramid | Rio Blanco | former post office | | |
| Pyrolite | Fremont | see Kenwood | | |

== Q ==
Select the OpenStreetMap link at the right to view the location of places in this section.

| Place | County | Type | Location | Elevation |
|---|---|---|---|---|
| Quail Hill | Adams | Westminster neighborhood | 39.9631°N 105.0022°W | 5,262 feet (1,604 m) |
| Quaker Acres | Jefferson | unincorporated community | 39.8306°N 105.1872°W | 5,702 feet (1,738 m) |
| Quarry | Montezuma | former post office | | |
| Quartz | Gunnison | former post office | | |
| Quartzville | Gunnison | see Pitkin | | |
| Quartzville | Park | ghost town | 39.3450°N 106.0772°W | 11,572 feet (3,527 m) |
| Quebec | Huerfano | former post office | | |
| Queen Beach | Kiowa | former post office | | |
| Queensborough | Arapahoe | Aurora neighborhood | 39.7000°N 104.8517°W | 5,512 feet (1,680 m) |
| Querida | Custer | ghost town | 38.1261°N 105.3344°W | 8,986 feet (2,739 m) |
| Quimby | Adams | Thornton neighborhood | 39.8733°N 104.9439°W | 5,190 feet (1,582 m) |

== R ==
Select the OpenStreetMap link at the right to view the location of places in this section.

| Place | County | Type | Location | Elevation |
|---|---|---|---|---|
| Radiant | Fremont | see Kenwood | | |
| Radium | Grand | unincorporated community | | |
| Ragged Mountain | Gunnison | former post office | | |
| Rago | Washington | unincorporated community | 40.0019°N 103.4155°W | 4,564 feet (1,391 m) |
| Rainbow Hills | Jefferson | unincorporated community | 39.7133°N 105.3386°W | 7,602 feet (2,317 m) |
| Rainbow Ridge | Jefferson | Arvada neighborhood | 39.7939°N 105.1342°W | 5,505 feet (1,678 m) |
| Ralston | Jefferson | former post office | | |
| Ralston Estates | Jefferson | Arvada neighborhood | 39.8164°N 105.1467°W | 5,499 feet (1,676 m) |
| Ralston Valley | Jefferson | Arvada neighborhood | 39.8269°N 105.1519°W | 5,512 feet (1,680 m) |
| Ralstons | Jefferson | see Ralston | | |
| Ramah | El Paso | statutory town | 39.1217°N 104.1658°W | 6,119 feet (1,865 m) |
| Ramon | Las Animas | former post office | | |
| Rand | Jackson | unincorporated community | 40.4539°N 106.1814°W | 8,629 feet (2,630 m) |
| Randall | Otero | unincorporated community | 38.0956°N 103.5797°W | 4,206 feet (1,282 m) |
| Rangely | Rio Blanco | statutory town | 40.0875°N 108.8048°W | 5,233 feet (1,595 m) |
| Rangley | Rio Blanco | see Rangely | | |
| Rapson | Las Animas | former post office | | |
| Rathbone (Note: The Decatur, Colorado, post office closed on January 28, 1885, but reopened as Rathbone on September 19, 1891. The Rathbone post office closed on July 1, 1895, but reopened as the second Argentine post office on November 18, 1901.) | Summit | see Decatur, Summit County | | |
| Raton | Las Animas | former post office | | |
| Rattlesnake Butte | Huerfano | former post office | | |
| Raven | Garfield | former post office | | |
| Ravens | Mesa | see Ravensbeque | | |
| Ravensbeque | Mesa | former post office | | |
| Ravenwood | Huerfano | former post office | | |
| Rawlings | Bent | former post office | | |
| Raymer (Note: The Raymer, Colorado, post office closed on May 14, 1895. On November 13, 1909, the New Raymer, Colorado, post office opened near the train station, about 640 feet (200 m) southwest of the original post office. The Town of Raymer, the State of Colorado, and the United States Census Bureau prefer the original name.) | Weld | statutory town | 40.6080°N 103.8425°W | 4,777 feet (1,456 m) |
| Raymond | Boulder | unincorporated community | 40.1550°N 105.4644°W | 7,808 feet (2,380 m) |
| Read | Delta | unincorporated community | 38.7661°N 107.9762°W | 5,003 feet (1,525 m) |
| Recen | Summit | former statutory town | 39.4309°N 106.1839°W | |
| Red Cliff‡ (Note: Red Cliff served as the original seat of Eagle County, Colorado since the county was created on February 11, 1883, until 1921. Red Cliff changed its name to Redcliff on February 7, 1895; then changed it back to Red Cliff on April 1, 1979.) | Eagle | statutory town | 39.5122°N 106.3681°W | 8,671 feet (2,643 m) |
| Red Elephant | Clear Creek | see Elephant | | |
| Red Feather Lakes | Larimer | census-designated place | 40.8025°N 105.5917°W | 8,346 feet (2,544 m) |
| Red Lion | Logan | unincorporated community | 40.8917°N 102.6769°W | 3,648 feet (1,112 m) |
| Red Mesa | La Plata | former post office | | |
| Red Mountain | Grand | former post office | | |
| Red Mountain | Gunnison | former post office | | |
| Red Mountain | Ouray | see Red Mountain Town | | |
| Red Mountain Town | Ouray | ghost town | | |
| Red Wing | Huerfano | unincorporated community | 37.7361°N 105.2900°W | 7,726 feet (2,355 m) |
| Redcliff‡ | Eagle | see Red Cliff | | |
| Redlands | Mesa | census-designated place | 39.0789°N 108.6357°W | 4,659 feet (1,420 m) |
| Redmesa | La Plata | unincorporated community | 37.0944°N 108.1704°W | 6,549 feet (1,996 m) |
| Redmond | Larimer | unincorporated community | 40.4789°N 105.0408°W | 4,925 feet (1,501 m) |
| Reds Place | Larimer | unincorporated community | 40.7305°N 105.8717°W | 8,406 feet (2,562 m) |
| Redstone | Pitkin | census-designated place | 39.1822°N 107.2383°W | 7,175 feet (2,187 m) |
| Redvale | Montrose | census-designated place | 38.1761°N 108.4125°W | 6,499 feet (1,981 m) |
| Redwing | Huerfano | former post office | | |
| Regis | Denver | Denver neighborhood | | |
| Regnier (Note: In 1920, the Regnier, Colorado, post office in Baca County was replaced by a Regnier, Oklahoma post office across the stateline in Cimarron County, Oklahoma.) | Baca | former post office | | |
| Reilly Canyon | Las Animas | unincorporated community | 37.2545°N 104.7100°W | 7,162 feet (2,183 m) |
| Renaraye | Montezuma | former post office | | |
| Rene | Otero | former post office | | |
| Resort | Jefferson | see Dawson, Jefferson County | | |
| Resurrection Mill | Lake | unincorporated community | 39.2353°N 106.2770°W | 10,276 feet (3,132 m) |
| Rex | Larimer | unincorporated community | 40.7889°N 105.1783°W | 5,922 feet (1,805 m) |
| Rexford | Summit | ghost town | 39.5339°N 105.8958°W | 11,430 feet (3,484 m) |
| Rhone | Mesa | unincorporated community | 39.1266°N 108.6784°W | 4,521 feet (1,378 m) |
| Richards | Baca | former post office | | |
| Richfield | Conejos | unincorporated community | 37.2778°N 105.9450°W | 7,595 feet (2,315 m) |
| Richlawn Hills | Douglas | unincorporated community | 39.4657°N 104.7826°W | 6,060 feet (1,847 m) |
| Rico‡ (Note: Rico served as the original seat of Dolores County, Colorado since the county was created on March 4, 1881, until 1945.) | Dolores | home rule town | 37.6928°N 108.0304°W | 8,825 feet (2,690 m) |
| Ridge | Jefferson | former post office | | |
| Ridgewood | Boulder | unincorporated community | 39.9658°N 105.4236°W | 8,054 feet (2,455 m) |
| Ridgewood Park | Arapahoe | Littleton neighborhood | 39.5903°N 105.0186°W | 5,410 feet (1,649 m) |
| Ridgway | Ouray | home rule town | 38.1528°N 107.7617°W | 7,047 feet (2,148 m) |
| Rifle | Garfield | home rule city | 39.5347°N 107.7831°W | 5,348 feet (1,630 m) |
| Riland | Garfield | former post office | | |
| Rinn | Weld | unincorporated community | 40.1389°N 104.9989°W | 4,875 feet (1,486 m) |
| RiNo (Note: The name RiNo stands for the "River North Art District", the area north of downtown Denver along the South Platte River.) | Denver | see River North Art District | | |
| Rio Alto | Saguache | former post office | | |
| Rio Blanco | Rio Blanco | unincorporated community | 39.7378°N 107.9454°W | 7,267 feet (2,215 m) |
| Rio Blanco County | | county | 39.9807°N 108.2179°W | |
| Rio Grande | Alamosa | former post office | | |
| Rio Grande County | | county | 37.5825°N 106.3832°W | |
| Rioblanco | Rio Blanco | see Rio Blanco | | |
| Rito Alto | Saguache | former post office | | |
| Riva Chase | Jefferson | unincorporated community | 39.6961°N 105.2572°W | 7,293 feet (2,223 m) |
| Rivas | Moffat | former post office | | |
| River Bend | Elbert | former post office | | |
| River North Art District | Denver | Denver art district | | |
| River Portal | Montrose | former post office | | |
| Riverdale | Bent | unincorporated community | 38.0586°N 103.3166°W | 3,950 feet (1,204 m) |
| Riverside | Boulder | unincorporated community | 40.1755°N 105.4372°W | 7,444 feet (2,269 m) |
| Riverside | Chaffee | unincorporated community | 38.9383°N 106.1839°W | 8,346 feet (2,544 m) |
| Riverview | Jefferson | unincorporated community | 39.3975°N 105.2680°W | 6,654 feet (2,028 m) |
| Roach | Jackson | former post office | | |
| Roan | Mesa | see Rhone | | |
| Roaring Fork | Pitkin | former post office | | |
| Robb | Yuma | unincorporated community | 40.1025°N 102.3719°W | 3,724 feet (1,135 m) |
| Robert Fisher's Fort | Pueblo | see El Pueblo | | |
| Roberta | Otero | unincorporated community | 37.9964°N 103.6758°W | 4,154 feet (1,266 m) |
| Robinson | Fremont | see Adelaide, Fremont County | | |
| Robinson | Summit | former statutory town | 39.4030°N 106.1993°W | |
| Robinson Place | Moffat | unincorporated community | 40.4058°N 108.9860°W | 7,799 feet (2,377 m) |
| Roby | Las Animas | see Model | | |
| Rock Butte | Elbert | former post office | | |
| Rock Cliff | Saguache | former post office | | |
| Rock Creek | Boulder | Superior neighborhood | 39.9361°N 105.1564°W | 5,548 feet (1,691 m) |
| Rock Creek | El Paso | see Rock Creek Park | | |
| Rock Creek | Pueblo | former post office | | |
| Rock Creek Park | El Paso | census-designated place | 38.7025°N 104.8391°W | 6,329 feet (1,929 m) |
| Rock Ridge | Douglas | former post office | | |
| Rockdale | Chaffee | unincorporated community | 38.9914°N 106.4117°W | 9,990 feet (3,045 m) |
| Rockdale | Fremont | see Rockvale | | |
| Rockland | Huerfano | see Solar | | |
| Rockland | Logan | unincorporated community | 40.5105°N 102.7199°W | 4,170 feet (1,271 m) |
| Rockport | Weld | unincorporated community | 40.8986°N 104.7966°W | 5,653 feet (1,723 m) |
| Rockrimmon | El Paso | Colorado Springs neighborhood | | |
| Rockvale | Fremont | statutory town | 38.3697°N 105.1639°W | 5,463 feet (1,665 m) |
| Rockville | Boulder | see Rowena | | |
| Rockwood | La Plata | unincorporated community | 37.4908°N 107.8020°W | 7,359 feet (2,243 m) |
| Rocky | Mesa | former post office | | |
| Rocky | Park | former post office | | |
| Rocky Ford | Otero | statutory city | 38.0525°N 103.7202°W | 4,180 feet (1,274 m) |
| Rocky Mountain Arsenal | Adams | former U.S. Army facility | 39.8336°N 104.8419°W | 5,259 feet (1,603 m) |
| Rocky Ridge | Douglas | former post office | | |
| Rodley | Baca | former post office | | |
| Roe | Montrose | unincorporated community | 38.5378°N 107.9448°W | 5,564 feet (1,696 m) |
| Rogers | Yuma | former post office | | |
| Rogers Mesa | Delta | unincorporated community | 38.7792°N 107.7931°W | 5,427 feet (1,654 m) |
| Rogersville | Ouray | former post office | | |
| Roggen | Weld | unincorporated community | 40.1675°N 104.3722°W | 4,711 feet (1,436 m) |
| Rolla | Adams | Commerce City neighborhood | 39.8692°N 104.8914°W | 5,102 feet (1,555 m) |
| Rolling Hills | Jefferson | Wheat Ridge neighborhood | 39.7656°N 105.1153°W | 5,453 feet (1,662 m) |
| Rollinsville | Gilpin | census-designated place | 39.9232°N 105.5136°W | 8,668 feet (2,642 m) |
| Romeo | Conejos | statutory town | 37.1722°N 105.9853°W | 7,736 feet (2,358 m) |
| Romley | Chaffee | ghost town | 38.6750°N 106.3700°W | 10,318 feet (3,145 m) |
| Rosa | El Paso | former post office | | |
| Rosedale | Denver | Denver neighborhood | | |
| Rosedale | Jefferson | unincorporated community | 39.6400°N 105.3830°W | 7,490 feet (2,283 m) |
| Rosedale | Weld | unincorporated community | 40.3853°N 104.6986°W | 4,705 feet (1,434 m) |
| Rosemont | Teller | unincorporated community | 38.7422°N 104.9569°W | 9,823 feet (2,994 m) |
| Roses Cabin | Hinsdale | former post office | | |
| Rosevale | Mesa | unincorporated community | 39.0600°N 108.5804°W | 4,560 feet (1,390 m) |
| Rosita‡ (Note: Rosita served as the seat of Custer County, Colorado from 1878 until 1886.) | Custer | ghost town | 38.0972°N 105.3361°W | 8,809 feet (2,685 m) |
| Roswell | El Paso | Colorado Springs neighborhood | 38.8736°N 104.8194°W | 6,142 feet (1,872 m) |
| Roubideau | Delta | former post office | | |
| Roudebush | Eagle | see Mitchell | | |
| Round Corral | Douglas | see Sedalia | | |
| Round Hill | Saguache | see Alder | | |
| Round Oak | Huerfano | former post office | | |
| Roundup Junction | Montezuma | unincorporated community | 37.4828°N 108.1623°W | 10,249 feet (3,124 m) |
| Rouse | Huerfano | unincorporated community | 37.4908°N 104.7117°W | 6,509 feet (1,984 m) |
| Routt | Moffat | former post office | | |
| Routt | Routt | former post office | | |
| Routt County | | county | 40.4841°N 106.9908°W | |
| Rowe | Prowers | former post office | | |
| Rowena | Boulder | unincorporated community | 40.0769°N 105.3894°W | 7,201 feet (2,195 m) |
| Roxborough | Douglas | unincorporated community | 39.4693°N 105.0856°W | 5,850 feet (1,783 m) |
| Roxborough Park | Douglas | census-designated place | 39.4739°N 105.0853°W | 5,745 feet (1,751 m) |
| Roy | Weld | unincorporated community | 40.1097°N 104.5655°W | 4,984 feet (1,519 m) |
| Royal Gorge | Fremont | former post office | | |
| Ruby | Gunnison | unincorporated community | 38.8661°N 107.0956°W | 10,030 feet (3,057 m) |
| Ruby | Pitkin | ghost town | 39.0208°N 106.6092°W | 11,381 feet (3,469 m) |
| Ruby City | Ouray | former post office | | |
| Ruby Hill | Denver | Denver neighborhood | 39.6861°N 105.0114°W | 5,344 feet (1,629 m) |
| Ruction | Jackson | former post office | | |
| Rudolph | Montrose | former post office | | |
| Ruedi (Note: The site of Ruedi is submerged in Ruedi Reservoir.) | Eagle | ghost town | 39.3664°N 106.7981°W | 7,772 feet (2,369 m) |
| Ruff | Baca | former post office | | |
| Rugby | Las Animas | unincorporated community | 37.4700°N 104.6650°W | 6,476 feet (1,974 m) |
| Ruin Canyon | Montezuma | former post office | | |
| Rule | Bent | former post office | | |
| Rulison | Garfield | unincorporated community | 39.4972°N 107.9406°W | 5,190 feet (1,582 m) |
| Running Creek | Elbert | former post office | | |
| Rush | El Paso | unincorporated community | 38.8400°N 104.0922°W | 6,017 feet (1,834 m) |
| Russell | Costilla | unincorporated community | 37.5553°N 105.2878°W | 8,428 feet (2,569 m) |
| Russell Gulch | Gilpin | ghost town | 39.7786°N 105.5369°W | 9,147 feet (2,788 m) |
| Russellville | Douglas | former statutory town | 39.3725°N 104.7495°W | |
| Rustic | Larimer | unincorporated community | 40.6993°N 105.5813°W | 7,162 feet (2,183 m) |
| Ruxton | Bent | unincorporated community | 37.7481°N 103.1466°W | 4,222 feet (1,287 m) |
| Rye | Pueblo | statutory town | 37.9236°N 104.9303°W | 6,801 feet (2,073 m) |

== S ==
Select the OpenStreetMap link at the right to view the location of places in this section.

| Place | County | Type | Location | Elevation |
|---|---|---|---|---|
| Sable | Adams | Aurora neighborhood | 39.7664°N 104.8311°W | 5,341 feet (1,628 m) |
| Sableridge | Arapahoe | Aurora neighborhood | 39.6919°N 104.8236°W | 5,604 feet (1,708 m) |
| Sacramento City | Clear Creek | see Idaho Springs | | |
| Saddle Ridge | Morgan | census-designated place | 40.3131°N 103.8023°W | 4,478 feet (1,365 m) |
| Saddlebrook | Douglas | Parker neighborhood | 39.5167°N 104.7339°W | 5,958 feet (1,816 m) |
| Sage | Gunnison | former post office | | |
| Sago | Montezuma | former post office | | |
| Saguache† (Note: On December 29, 1866, the Territory of Colorado created Saguache County, Colorado Territory with Saguache as the county seat, and since statehood on August 1, 1876, the seat of Saguache County, Colorado.) (Note: The name "Saguache" is pronounced /səˈwætʃ/. This name comes from the Ute language noun "sawup" /səˈwʌp/ meaning "sand dunes". The Spanish language version of this name is usually spelled "Saguache", while the English language version is usually spelled "Sawatch".) | Saguache | statutory town | 38.0875°N 106.1420°W | 7,703 feet (2,348 m) |
| Saguache County | | county | 38.0807°N 106.2809°W | |
| Saint Ann Highlands | Boulder | census-designated place | 39.9869°N 105.4561°W | 8,255 feet (2,516 m) |
| Saint Charles | Pueblo | unincorporated community | 38.1389°N 104.6214°W | 4,964 feet (1,513 m) |
| Saint Cloud | Larimer | see Cherokee Park | | |
| Saint Elmo | Chaffee | ghost town | 38.7047°N 106.3481°W | 10,007 feet (3,050 m) |
| Saint Kevin | Lake | former post office | | |
| Saint Marys | Huerfano | former post office | | |
| Saint Mary's | Clear Creek | census-designated place | 39.8163°N 105.6479°W | 10,062 feet (3,067 m) |
| Saint Peter | El Paso | former post office | | |
| Saint Petersburg | Logan | unincorporated community | 40.5555°N 102.8171°W | 4,229 feet (1,289 m) |
| Saint Thomas | Las Animas | unincorporated community | 37.1345°N 104.5575°W | 6,234 feet (1,900 m) |
| Saint Vrain‡ (Note: On November 28, 1859, the Provisional Government of the Territory of Jefferson created 12 counties, with Saint Vrain as the seat of St. Vrain County, Jefferson Territory. On November 1, 1861, the new Territory of Colorado created 17 original counties, with Saint Vrain as the original seat of Weld County, Colorado Territory, serving until 1868.) | Weld | ghost town | 40.2770°N 104.8527°W | 4,764 feet (1,452 m) |
| Saint Vrains | Weld | ghost town | 40.0369°N 104.9547°W | 5,108 feet (1,557 m) |
| Saints John | Summit | ghost town | 39.5717°N 105.8817°W | 10,764 feet (3,281 m) |
| Salem | Arapahoe | former post office | | |
| Salida† (Note: On March 28, 1881, Arkansas changed its name to Salida. Salida has served as the seat of Chaffee County, Colorado since 1928.) | Chaffee | statutory city | 38.5347°N 105.9989°W | 7,083 feet (2,159 m) |
| Salina | Boulder | unincorporated community | 40.0505°N 105.3725°W | 6,601 feet (2,012 m) |
| Salt Creek | Pueblo | census-designated place | 38.2384°N 104.5871°W | 4,751 feet (1,448 m) |
| Sample | Fremont | unincorporated community | 38.4722°N 105.3555°W | 5,735 feet (1,748 m) |
| Sams | San Miguel | unincorporated community | | |
| San Acacio | Costilla | census-designated place | 37.2086°N 105.5666°W | 7,720 feet (2,353 m) |
| San Antonia | Las Animas | see Augusta, Las Animas County | | |
| San Antonio | Conejos | unincorporated community | 37.0208°N 106.0281°W | 7,943 feet (2,421 m) |
| San Bernardo | San Miguel | former post office | | |
| San Isabel | Custer | unincorporated community | 37.9875°N 105.0544°W | 8,514 feet (2,595 m) |
| San Isabel | Saguache | former post office | | |
| San Isidro | Las Animas | see Abeyta | | |
| San Jose | Las Animas | see Grinnell | | |
| San Juan‡ (Note: San Juan City served as the original seat of Hinsdale County, Colorado Territory since the county was created on February 10, 1874, until 1875. On June 4, 1874, San Juan City officially shortened its name to San Juan, although it was still commonly known as San Juan City.) | Hinsdale | see San Juan City | | |
| San Juan City‡ | Hinsdale | ghost town | | |
| San Juan County | | county | 37.7640°N 107.6762°W | |
| San Luis† (Note: San Luis de la Culebra was settled on April 9, 1851. In 1863, county voters selected San Luis as the new seat of Costilla County, Colorado Territory, and since statehood on August 1, 1876, the seat of Costilla County, Colorado. San Luis is the oldest continuously occupied community in Colorado.) | Costilla | statutory town | 37.2008°N 105.4239°W | 7,982 feet (2,433 m) |
| San Luis de la Culebra | Costilla | see San Luis | | |
| San Miguel‡ (Note: On November 1, 1861, the Territory of Colorado created 17 original counties, with San Miguel as the original seat of Costilla County, Colorado Territory. When its post office opened on November 13, 1862, the village selected the new name Costilla, perhaps in recognition of its new status. In 1863, county voters decided to move the county seat 17 miles (27 km) north to San Luis. In 1869, a U.S. government survey determined that Costilla was actually located in Taos County, New Mexico Territory. It wasn't until October 21, 1872, that the village post office was officially renamed Costilla, New Mexico Territory.) | Costilla | see Costilla, New Mexico | | |
| San Miguel | Las Animas | unincorporated community | 37.0995°N 104.3955°W | 6,850 feet (2,088 m) |
| San Miguel | San Miguel | unincorporated community | 37.9469°N 107.8359°W | 8,750 feet (2,667 m) |
| San Miguel County | | county | 38.0042°N 108.4057°W | |
| San Pablo | Costilla | unincorporated community | 37.1492°N 105.3970°W | 8,094 feet (2,467 m) |
| San Pedro | Costilla | unincorporated community | 37.1597°N 105.4025°W | 8,074 feet (2,461 m) |
| San Pedro | Las Animas | see Starkville | | |
| San Rafael | Conejos | see Paisaje | | |
| Sanatorium | Jefferson | see Spivak | | |
| Sanborn | Lincoln | former post office | | |
| Sand Arroyo | Baca | former post office | | |
| Sandown | Denver | Denver neighborhood | 39.7725°N 104.9014°W | 5,276 feet (1,608 m) |
| Sanford | Conejos | home rule town | 37.2583°N 105.9047°W | 7,602 feet (2,317 m) |
| Sangre de Cristo | Saguache | former post office | | |
| Santa Clara | Huerfano | former post office | | |
| Santa Maria | Park | unincorporated community | 39.4497°N 105.6333°W | 8,471 feet (2,582 m) |
| Sapinero | Gunnison | unincorporated community | 38.4594°N 107.3023°W | 7,621 feet (2,323 m) |
| Sarcillo | Las Animas | unincorporated community | 37.1256°N 104.7594°W | 6,594 feet (2,010 m) |
| Sargents | Saguache | unincorporated community | 38.4042°N 106.4150°W | 8,478 feet (2,584 m) |
| Sarinda | Logan | former post office | | |
| Satank | Garfield | unincorporated community | 39.4139°N 107.2284°W | 6,119 feet (1,865 m) |
| Saugus | Lincoln | former post office | | |
| Saunders | Delta | unincorporated community | 38.7603°N 108.0101°W | 4,993 feet (1,522 m) |
| Sawpit | San Miguel | statutory town | 37.9953°N 108.0017°W | 7,592 feet (2,314 m) |
| Saxton | Delta | unincorporated community | 38.7683°N 107.9715°W | 5,007 feet (1,526 m) |
| Scenic Heights | Jefferson | Arvada neighborhood | 39.8128°N 105.0850°W | 5,436 feet (1,657 m) |
| Schistos | Saguache | former post office | | |
| Schley | Elbert | former post office | | |
| Schlueter | Washington | former post office | | |
| Scholl | Grand | former post office | | |
| Schramm | Yuma | unincorporated community | 40.1139°N 102.6060°W | 4,022 feet (1,226 m) |
| Schriever Space Force Base | El Paso | U.S. Space Force base | | |
| Scissors | Huerfano | see Capps | | |
| Scofield | Gunnison | former post office | | |
| Scranton | Adams | former post office | | |
| Security | El Paso | unincorporated community | 38.7583°N 104.7430°W | 5,758 feet (1,755 m) |
| Security-Widefield CDP | El Paso | census-designated place | 38.7486°N 104.7141°W | 5,846 feet (1,782 m) |
| Sedalia | Douglas | census-designated place | 39.4369°N 104.9597°W | 5,843 feet (1,781 m) |
| Sedgewick | Saguache | ghost town | 38.2792°N 106.1478°W | 9,232 feet (2,814 m) |
| Sedgwick | Sedgwick | statutory town | 40.9364°N 102.5255°W | 3,586 feet (1,093 m) |
| Sedgwick County | | county | 40.8760°N 102.3518°W | |
| Seebarsee | Yuma | see Laird | | |
| Segreganset | Kiowa | former post office | | |
| Segundo | Las Animas | census-designated place | | |
| Seguro | Huerfano | former post office | | |
| Seibert | Kit Carson | statutory town | 39.2992°N 102.8691°W | 4,711 feet (1,436 m) |
| Selak | Grand | former post office | | |
| Sellar | Pitkin | former post office | | |
| Selma | Logan | unincorporated community | 40.7714°N 103.0310°W | 3,816 feet (1,163 m) |
| Semper | Jefferson | Arvada neighborhood | 39.8561°N 105.0647°W | 5,436 feet (1,657 m) |
| Sequndo | Las Animas | census-designated place | 37.1209°N 104.7222°W | 6,542 feet (1,994 m) |
| Serene | Weld | ghost town | | |
| Seton | Baca | see Setonsburg | | |
| Setonsburg | Baca | former post office | | |
| Settlers Village | Arapahoe | Aurora neighborhood | 39.7003°N 104.8147°W | 5,541 feet (1,689 m) |
| Seven Castles | Eagle | former post office | | |
| Seven Hills | Arapahoe | Aurora neighborhood | 39.6583°N 104.7614°W | 5,623 feet (1,714 m) |
| Seven Hills | Boulder | census-designated place | 40.0264°N 105.3119°W | 5,922 feet (1,805 m) |
| Seven Lakes | Teller | ghost town | 38.7817°N 105.0086°W | 10,984 feet (3,348 m) |
| Sevenmile Plaza | Rio Grande | unincorporated community | 37.6481°N 106.2375°W | 7,766 feet (2,367 m) |
| Severance | Weld | statutory town | 40.5241°N 104.8511°W | 4,888 feet (1,490 m) |
| Seward | Teller | see Clyde, Teller County | | |
| Seymour | San Miguel | see Sawpit | | |
| Shaffers Crossing | Jefferson | unincorporated community | 39.4786°N 105.3683°W | 7,927 feet (2,416 m) |
| Shamballah-Ashrama | Douglas | unincorporated community | 39.3430°N 105.0333°W | 7,073 feet (2,156 m) |
| Shamrock | Adams | unincorporated community | 39.8853°N 103.8163°W | 4,892 feet (1,491 m) |
| Sharpsdale | Huerfano | former post office | | |
| Shavano | Chaffee | ghost town | 38.6028°N 106.2903°W | 10,748 feet (3,276 m) |
| Shaw | Lincoln | unincorporated community | 39.5505°N 103.3608°W | 5,157 feet (1,572 m) |
| Shaw Heights | Adams | census-designated place | 39.8525°N 105.0431°W | 5,449 feet (1,661 m) |
| Shawnee | Park | unincorporated community | 39.4211°N 105.5542°W | 8,120 feet (2,475 m) |
| Sheephorn | Eagle | unincorporated community | 39.8922°N 106.4670°W | 7,972 feet (2,430 m) |
| Sheffield | Denver | see Denver Mills | | |
| Shelton | Boulder | former post office | | |
| Shelton | Otero | unincorporated community | 38.0833°N 103.6063°W | 4,203 feet (1,281 m) |
| Shenandoah | Arapahoe | Aurora neighborhood | 39.6269°N 104.8075°W | 5,778 feet (1,761 m) |
| Shenandoah | Montrose | former post office | | |
| Sheridan | Arapahoe | home rule city | 39.6469°N 105.0253°W | 5,322 feet (1,622 m) |
| Sheridan Green | Jefferson | Westminster neighborhood | 39.8967°N 105.0650°W | 5,299 feet (1,615 m) |
| Sheridan Lake‡ (Note: On September 20, 1887, Bee changed its name to Sheridan Lake; then changed it back to Bee on October 15, 1887; then changed it back again to Sheridan Lake on October 27, 1887. Sheridan Lake served as the original seat of Kiowa County, Colorado since the county was created on April 11, 1889, until 1902.) | Kiowa | statutory town | 38.4667°N 102.2921°W | 4,072 feet (1,241 m) |
| Sherman | Eagle | former post office | | |
| Sherman | Hinsdale | former post office | | |
| Sherrelwood | Adams | census-designated place | 39.8378°N 105.0014°W | 5,292 feet (1,613 m) |
| Sherrelwood Estates | Adams | unincorporated community | 39.8447°N 105.0094°W | 5,387 feet (1,642 m) |
| Sherwood Farms | Jefferson | Arvada neighborhood | 39.8322°N 105.1747°W | 5,591 feet (1,704 m) |
| Shields | Yuma | former post office | | |
| Shirley | Chaffee | ghost town | 38.4244°N 106.1284°W | 8,652 feet (2,637 m) |
| Shirley | El Paso | unincorporated community | 38.9011°N 104.6533°W | 6,677 feet (2,035 m) |
| Shirley | Saguache | former post office | | |
| Shistos | Saguache | former post office | | |
| Shoshone | Garfield | former post office | | |
| Shumway | Huerfano | former post office | | |
| Side Creek | Arapahoe | Aurora neighborhood | 39.6883°N 104.7661°W | 5,600 feet (1,707 m) |
| Sidney | Pitkin | former post office | | |
| Sidney | Routt | former post office | | |
| Sierra Estates | Jefferson | Arvada neighborhood | 39.8358°N 105.1047°W | 5,591 feet (1,704 m) |
| Sierra Ridge | Douglas | census-designated place | 39.5314°N 104.8181°W | 5,906 feet (1,800 m) |
| Sierra Vista | Jefferson | Arvada neighborhood | 39.8358°N 105.1133°W | 5,623 feet (1,714 m) |
| Sigman | Adams | former post office | | |
| Signal | El Paso | former post office | | |
| Sikes | Fremont | unincorporated community | 38.2583°N 105.0747°W | 5,935 feet (1,809 m) |
| Sillsville | Gunnison | unincorporated community | 38.4467°N 106.7611°W | 8,035 feet (2,449 m) |
| Siloam | Pueblo | ghost town | 38.2514°N 104.9758°W | 5,449 feet (1,661 m) |
| Silt | Garfield | home rule town | 39.5486°N 107.6562°W | 5,456 feet (1,663 m) |
| Silver Cliff‡ (Note: Silver Cliff served as the seat of Custer County, Colorado from 1886 until 1928.) | Custer | statutory town | 38.1353°N 105.4464°W | 7,986 feet (2,434 m) |
| Silver Creek | Clear Creek | ghost town | | |
| Silver Heights | Douglas | unincorporated community | 39.4180°N 104.8658°W | 6,234 feet (1,900 m) |
| Silver Lake | San Juan | see Arastra | | |
| Silver Lake | Summit | former post office | | |
| Silver Ledge | San Juan | former post office | | |
| Silver Park | Custer | former post office | | |
| Silver Plume | Clear Creek | statutory town | 39.6961°N 105.7258°W | 9,101 feet (2,774 m) |
| Silver Springs | Boulder | unincorporated community | 40.0155°N 105.4544°W | 8,114 feet (2,473 m) |
| Silver Springs | Park | unincorporated community | 39.4592°N 105.3961°W | 8,399 feet (2,560 m) |
| Silver Spruce | Boulder | unincorporated community | 40.0047°N 105.3478°W | 6,063 feet (1,848 m) |
| Silverdale | Chaffee | former post office | | |
| Silverdale | Clear Creek | ghost town | 39.6917°N 105.6961°W | 9,275 feet (2,827 m) |
| Silverplume | Clear Creek | see Silver Plume | | |
| Silverthorne | Summit | home rule town | 39.6321°N 106.0743°W | 8,757 feet (2,669 m) |
| Silverton† (Note: On January 31, 1876, the Territory of Colorado created San Juan County, Colorado Territory with Silverton as the county seat, and since statehood on August 1 of that year, the seat of San Juan County, Colorado.) | San Juan | statutory town | 37.8119°N 107.6645°W | 9,308 feet (2,837 m) |
| Simla | Elbert | statutory town | 39.1417°N 104.0838°W | 5,978 feet (1,822 m) |
| Simpson | Adams | former post office | | |
| Simpson | Las Animas | unincorporated community | 37.4978°N 104.1672°W | 5,620 feet (1,713 m) |
| Sinbad | Montrose | former post office | | |
| Singleton | Park | unincorporated community | 39.4430°N 105.6019°W | 8,301 feet (2,530 m) |
| Sinnard | Larimer | unincorporated community | 40.5883°N 105.0033°W | 4,944 feet (1,507 m) |
| Sitton | Pueblo | former post office | | |
| 16th Street Mall | Denver | see Downtown Denver | | |
| Skinner | Fremont | former post office | | |
| Skinners | El Paso | unincorporated community | 38.7689°N 104.7614°W | 5,778 feet (1,761 m) |
| Skull Creek | Moffat | former post office | | |
| Sky Village | Jefferson | unincorporated community | 39.5505°N 105.2472°W | 7,877 feet (2,401 m) |
| Skyland | Denver | Denver neighborhood | | |
| Skyline Estates | Jefferson | Arvada neighborhood | 39.7961°N 105.1181°W | 5,466 feet (1,666 m) |
| Skyline Vista | Adams | Westminster neighborhood | 39.8306°N 105.0200°W | 5,318 feet (1,621 m) |
| Slaghts | Park | see Shawnee | | |
| Slate Creek | Summit | unincorporated community | 39.7842°N 106.1634°W | 8,205 feet (2,501 m) |
| Slater | Moffat | unincorporated community | 40.9477°N 107.4978°W | 7,753 feet (2,363 m) |
| Slavonia | Routt | unincorporated community | 40.7844°N 106.7042°W | 9,797 feet (2,986 m) |
| Slick Rock | San Miguel | unincorporated community | | |
| Sligo | Weld | former post office | | |
| Sloan | Weld | unincorporated community | 40.0516°N 104.4880°W | 4,921 feet (1,500 m) |
| Sloan Lake | Denver | Denver neighborhood | | |
| Sloss | Eagle | former post office | | |
| Smeltertown | Chaffee | census-designated place | 38.5523°N 106.0084°W | 7,142 feet (2,177 m) |
| Smith Canyon | Las Animas | former post office | | |
| Smith Hill | Gilpin | unincorporated community | 39.7783°N 105.4586°W | 7,648 feet (2,331 m) |
| Smith Place | Gunnison | unincorporated community | 38.2017°N 107.0598°W | 8,438 feet (2,572 m) |
| Smuggler | San Miguel | former post office | | |
| Sneffels | Ouray | ghost town | 37.9753°N 107.7498°W | 10,620 feet (3,237 m) |
| Snipes | Mesa | see Molina | | |
| Snow Water Springs | Jefferson | unincorporated community | 39.2647°N 105.2169°W | 6,358 feet (1,938 m) |
| Snowden | Lake | former post office | | |
| Snowmass | Gunnison | former post office | | |
| Snowmass | Pitkin | unincorporated community | 39.3317°N 106.9862°W | 6,847 feet (2,087 m) |
| Snowmass Village | Pitkin | home rule town | 39.2130°N 106.9378°W | 8,209 feet (2,502 m) |
| Snyder | Morgan | census-designated place | 40.3308°N 103.5920°W | 4,180 feet (1,274 m) |
| Soda Spring | Lake | former post office | | |
| Solar | Huerfano | former post office | | |
| Somerset | Gunnison | census-designated place | 38.9264°N 107.4703°W | 6,030 feet (1,838 m) |
| Somerset Village | Arapahoe | Aurora neighborhood | 39.6950°N 104.7883°W | 5,561 feet (1,695 m) |
| Sopris | Las Animas | ghost town | 37.1347°N 104.5644°W | 6,234 feet (1,900 m) |
| Sopris Plaza | Las Animas | unincorporated community | 37.1406°N 104.5755°W | 6,234 feet (1,900 m) |
| Sorrento | Cheyenne | former post office | | |
| South Arkansas | Chaffee | see Poncha Springs | | |
| South Boulder | Gilpin | former post office | | |
| South Cañon | Garfield | former post office | | |
| South Denver (Note: The City of Denver annexed the Town of South Denver on February 7, 1894.) | Denver | former statutory town | 39.6894°N 104.9840°W | |
| South Fork | Rio Grande | statutory town | 37.6700°N 106.6398°W | 8,209 feet (2,502 m) |
| South Park | Park | former post office | | |
| South Park Hill | Denver | Denver neighborhood | | |
| South Platte | Jefferson | unincorporated community | 39.4075°N 105.1714°W | 6,086 feet (1,855 m) |
| South Platte | Logan | former post office | | |
| South Pueblo | Pueblo | former statutory town | | |
| South Roggen | Weld | unincorporated community | 40.1022°N 104.3386°W | 4,806 feet (1,465 m) |
| South Side | Otero | former post office | | |
| Southern Ute | La Plata | census-designated place | 37.0749°N 107.5933°W | 6,565 feet (2,001 m) |
| Southfield Park | Arapahoe | Centennial neighborhood | 39.6006°N 104.8433°W | 5,686 feet (1,733 m) |
| Southglenn | Arapahoe | Centennial neighborhood | 39.5872°N 104.9528°W | 5,587 feet (1,703 m) |
| Southglenn CDP | Arapahoe | see Southglenn | | |
| Southmoor Park | Denver | Denver neighborhood | | |
| Southpark | Arapahoe | Littleton neighborhood | 39.5750°N 105.0203°W | 5,489 feet (1,673 m) |
| Southwater | El Paso | former post office | | |
| Spanish | Saguache | former post office | | |
| Spanish Bar | Clear Creek | former post office | | |
| Spanish Fort | Costilla | historic Spanish Army fort | | |
| Spanish Peak | Huerfano | see La Veta | | |
| Spanish Peaks | Huerfano | former post office | | |
| Spanish Village | Weld | unincorporated community | 40.3844°N 104.5463°W | 4,610 feet (1,405 m) |
| Spar | Mineral | see Spar City | | |
| Spar City | Mineral | ghost town | 37.7072°N 106.9684°W | 9,465 feet (2,885 m) |
| Spargo | Montezuma | former post office | | |
| Sparkill | Pitkin | see Independence, Pitkin County | | |
| Sparks | Moffat | former post office | | |
| Sparrow | Pueblo | former post office | | |
| Speer | Denver | Denver neighborhood | | |
| Spence | Washington | former post office | | |
| Spencer | Gunnison | former post office | | |
| Spencer Heights | Larimer | unincorporated community | 40.6741°N 105.7845°W | 7,904 feet (2,409 m) |
| Sperryvale | Pueblo | former post office | | |
| Sphinx Park | Jefferson | unincorporated community | 39.4244°N 105.3150°W | 7,051 feet (2,149 m) |
| Spicer | Jackson | former post office | | |
| Spinney | Park | former post office | | |
| Spivak | Jefferson | Lakewood neighborhood | 39.7447°N 105.0680°W | 5,407 feet (1,648 m) |
| Spook City | Saguache | unincorporated community | 38.2300°N 106.1972°W | 9,639 feet (2,938 m) |
| Spring | Gunnison | former post office | | |
| Spring Creek Meadows | Arapahoe | unincorporated community | 39.6406°N 104.7467°W | 5,738 feet (1,749 m) |
| Spring Gulch | Pitkin | see Gulch | | |
| Spring Hill | Jefferson | unincorporated community | 39.6353°N 105.1503°W | 5,768 feet (1,758 m) |
| Spring Mesa | Jefferson | Arvada neighborhood | 39.8378°N 105.1986°W | 5,866 feet (1,788 m) |
| Spring Ranch | Jefferson | unincorporated community | 39.6997°N 105.3156°W | 7,562 feet (2,305 m) |
| Spring Valley | Douglas | former post office | | |
| Springdale | Boulder | unincorporated community | 40.1097°N 105.3583°W | 6,565 feet (2,001 m) |
| Springer | Park | former post office | | |
| Springfield† (Note: Springfield has been the seat of Baca County, Colorado since the county was created on April 16, 1889.) | Baca | statutory town | 37.4083°N 102.6144°W | 4,360 feet (1,329 m) |
| Springvale | Las Animas | former post office | | |
| Spruce | Douglas | unincorporated community | 39.1567°N 104.8783°W | 7,054 feet (2,150 m) |
| Sprucedale | Jefferson | unincorporated community | 39.5889°N 105.3522°W | 7,625 feet (2,324 m) |
| Sprucewood | Douglas | unincorporated community | 39.3489°N 105.1208°W | 7,090 feet (2,161 m) |
| Spurgin | Weld | see Vim | | |
| Squaretop | Archuleta | former post office | | |
| Squaw Creek | Eagle | former post office | | |
| Squaw Point | Dolores | former post office | | |
| Squirrel Creek | El Paso | former post office | | |
| St. Vrain (Note: St. Vrain was the original seat of St. Vrain's County, Jefferson Territory and then Weld County, Colorado Territory.) | Weld | ghost town | | |
| Stage | Weld | unincorporated community | 40.6116°N 104.7427°W | 4,993 feet (1,522 m) |
| Stage Canyon | Las Animas | former post office | | |
| Stamford | Las Animas | former post office | | |
| Standish | Gunnison | former post office | | |
| Stanley | Costilla | former post office | | |
| Stanley Park | Jefferson | unincorporated community | 39.6183°N 105.2928°W | 7,808 feet (2,380 m) |
| Stapleton | Denver | see Central Park, Denver | | |
| Stapleton | Montezuma | unincorporated community | 37.4989°N 108.4048°W | 7,136 feet (2,175 m) |
| Starbuck | Jefferson | see Idledale | | |
| Starkville | Las Animas | statutory town | 37.1153°N 104.5242°W | 6,378 feet (1,944 m) |
| Starr | Phillips | former post office | | |
| State Bridge | Eagle | unincorporated community | 39.8578°N 106.6498°W | 6,742 feet (2,055 m) |
| Steamboat II | Routt | unincorporated community | 40.5080°N 106.9067°W | 6,608 feet (2,014 m) |
| Steamboat Springs† (Note: Steamboat Springs has served as the seat of Routt County, Colorado since 1912.) | Routt | home rule city | 40.4850°N 106.8317°W | 6,732 feet (2,052 m) |
| Steffens | Yuma | former post office | | |
| Stelbars Lindland | Jackson | unincorporated community | 40.5744°N 106.0647°W | 8,661 feet (2,640 m) |
| Stem Beach | Pueblo | unincorporated community | 38.1639°N 104.6436°W | 4,964 feet (1,513 m) |
| Stepping Stone | Douglas | census-designated place | 39.5138°N 104.8261°W | 6,027 feet (1,837 m) |
| Sterling† (Note: Sterling has been the seat of Logan County, Colorado since the county was created on February 25, 1887.) | Logan | home rule city | 40.6255°N 103.2077°W | 3,937 feet (1,200 m) |
| Sterling | Park | former post office | | |
| Sterling Ranch | Douglas | census-designated place | 39.5043°N 105.0368°W | 5,623 feet (1,714 m) |
| Stevens | Gunnison | former post office | | |
| Stevenson | Baca | former post office | | |
| Stewart | Kiowa | former post office | | |
| Stillwater | Grand | former post office | | |
| Stockade | Bent | former post office | | |
| Stockville | Las Animas | former post office | | |
| Stockyards | Denver | Denver post office | | |
| Stollsteimer | Archuleta | unincorporated community | 37.1417°N 107.3548°W | 6,286 feet (1,916 m) |
| Stone City | Pueblo | unincorporated community | 38.4486°N 104.8611°W | 5,545 feet (1,690 m) |
| Stone Ridge Park | Arapahoe | Aurora neighborhood | 39.6842°N 104.7956°W | 5,548 feet (1,691 m) |
| Stonegate | Douglas | census-designated place | 39.5308°N 104.8039°W | 5,866 feet (1,788 m) |
| Stoneham | Weld | unincorporated community | 40.6055°N 103.6666°W | 4,583 feet (1,397 m) |
| Stoner | Montezuma | unincorporated community | 37.5894°N 108.3201°W | 7,474 feet (2,278 m) |
| Stonewall | Chaffee | ghost town | 38.6311°N 106.3597°W | 11,263 feet (3,433 m) |
| Stonewall | Las Animas | see Stonewall Gap | | |
| Stonewall Gap | Las Animas | census-designated place | 37.1605°N 105.0342°W | 7,976 feet (2,431 m) |
| Stonington | Baca | unincorporated community | 37.2936°N 102.1874°W | 3,809 feet (1,161 m) |
| Stout (Note: Most of the town of Stout is now submerged in Horsetooth Reservoir.) | Larimer | ghost town | | |
| Stove Prairie Landing | Larimer | unincorporated community | 40.6825°N 105.3892°W | 6,079 feet (1,853 m) |
| Strange | Las Animas | former post office | | |
| Strasburg | Adams | census-designated place | 39.7383°N 104.3233°W | 5,381 feet (1,640 m) |
| Strasburg | Arapahoe | census-designated place | 39.7383°N 104.3233°W | 5,381 feet (1,640 m) |
| Stratmoor | El Paso | census-designated place | 38.7739°N 104.7797°W | 5,787 feet (1,764 m) |
| Stratmoor Hills | El Paso | unincorporated community | 38.7830°N 104.7944°W | 5,948 feet (1,813 m) |
| Stratton | Kit Carson | statutory town | 39.3033°N 102.6046°W | 4,413 feet (1,345 m) |
| Stratton | Teller | unincorporated community | 38.7478°N 105.1500°W | 10,394 feet (3,168 m) |
| Stratton Meadows | El Paso | Colorado Springs neighborhood | 38.8033°N 104.8116°W | 5,928 feet (1,807 m) |
| Streater | Alamosa | see Mosca | | |
| Stringtown | Lake | unincorporated community | 39.2336°N 106.3192°W | 9,813 feet (2,991 m) |
| Strong | Huerfano | unincorporated community | 37.7125°N 104.9022°W | 6,394 feet (1,949 m) |
| Strontia | Douglas | former post office | | |
| Strontia Springs | Jefferson | former post office | | |
| Stuart | Kiowa | unincorporated community | 38.4714°N 102.1946°W | 4,032 feet (1,229 m) |
| Stunner | Conejos | former post office | | |
| Sublime | El Paso | former post office | | |
| Suffolk | El Paso | former post office | | |
| Sugar | Prowers | unincorporated community | 38.1503°N 102.6685°W | 3,740 feet (1,140 m) |
| Sugar City | Crowley | statutory town | 38.2319°N 103.6630°W | 4,304 feet (1,312 m) |
| Sugar Junction | Rio Grande | unincorporated community | 37.5678°N 106.1125°W | 7,644 feet (2,330 m) |
| Sugarloaf | Boulder | census-designated place | 40.0189°N 105.4077°W | 7,841 feet (2,390 m) |
| Sullivan | Arapahoe | unincorporated community | 39.6714°N 104.8980°W | 5,479 feet (1,670 m) |
| Sullivan | Denver | Denver post office | | |
| Sulphur | Rio Blanco | former post office | | |
| Sulphur Springs (Note: Hot Sulphur Springs served as the original seat of Grand County, Colorado Territory since the county was created on February 2, 1874, and with statehood on August 1, 1876, the seat of Grand County, Colorado until 1882 and then again from 1888 to present. On June 26, 1894, Hot Sulphur Springs changed its name to Sulphur Springs, then changed it back to Hot Sulphur Springs on February 15, 1912.) | Grand | see Hot Sulphur Springs | | |
| Sulphur Springs | Park | former post office | | |
| Sultana | San Miguel | former post office | | |
| Summer Lake | Arapahoe | Aurora neighborhood | 39.6364°N 104.7672°W | 5,758 feet (1,755 m) |
| Summer Valley | Arapahoe | Aurora neighborhood | 39.6425°N 104.7811°W | 5,666 feet (1,727 m) |
| Summerville | Boulder | unincorporated community | 40.0569°N 105.3944°W | 7,392 feet (2,253 m) |
| Summit | Rio Grande | see Summitville | | |
| Summit County | | county | 39.6340°N 106.1160°W | |
| Summit Park | Teller | see Woodland Park | | |
| Summitville | Rio Grande | ghost town | 37.4306°N 106.5923°W | 11,286 feet (3,440 m) |
| Sun Valley | Denver | Denver neighborhood | | |
| Sun View | El Paso | former post office | | |
| Sunbeam | Moffat | unincorporated community | 40.5508°N 108.1959°W | 5,889 feet (1,795 m) |
| Sundown | Arapahoe | Aurora neighborhood | 39.6300°N 104.8222°W | 5,659 feet (1,725 m) |
| Sunland | Jefferson | Arvada neighborhood | 39.8328°N 105.0747°W | 5,436 feet (1,657 m) |
| Sunlight | Garfield | former post office | | |
| Sunnyside | Boulder | unincorporated community | 40.0036°N 105.3817°W | 6,411 feet (1,954 m) |
| Sunnyside | Denver | Denver neighborhood | | |
| Sunnyside | Hinsdale | former post office | | |
| Sunnyside | Mineral | unincorporated community | 37.8461°N 106.9603°W | 8,901 feet (2,713 m) |
| Sunnyslope Estates | Broomfield | Broomfield neighborhood | 39.9425°N 105.0400°W | 5,292 feet (1,613 m) |
| Sunnyvale | Arapahoe | Aurora neighborhood | 39.7233°N 104.8725°W | 5,400 feet (1,646 m) |
| Sunol | Fremont | former post office | | |
| Sunset | Boulder | ghost town | 40.0358°N 105.4689°W | 7,743 feet (2,360 m) |
| Sunset | Pueblo | Pueblo post office | | |
| Sunset City | Fremont | unincorporated community | 38.4125°N 105.4172°W | 6,755 feet (2,059 m) |
| Sunset Ridge | Adams | Westminster neighborhood | 39.8661°N 105.0344°W | 5,489 feet (1,673 m) |
| Sunshine | Boulder | census-designated place | 40.0637°N 105.3696°W | 7,346 feet (2,239 m) |
| Sunstream | Jefferson | Westminster neighborhood | 39.8678°N 105.1014°W | 5,423 feet (1,653 m) |
| Superior | Boulder | statutory town | 39.9528°N 105.1686°W | 5,499 feet (1,676 m) |
| Superior | Jefferson | statutory town | 39.9528°N 105.1686°W | 5,499 feet (1,676 m) |
| Supreme Estates | Jefferson | unincorporated community | 39.8283°N 105.1714°W | 5,597 feet (1,706 m) |
| Surber | El Paso | former post office | | |
| Surinda | Logan | former post office | | |
| Surrey Ridge | Douglas | unincorporated community | 39.4978°N 104.8826°W | 6,250 feet (1,905 m) |
| Suttle | Gunnison | former post office | | |
| Swallows | Pueblo | ghost town | 38.3022°N 104.8603°W | 4,885 feet (1,489 m) |
| Swallows Nest | Montezuma | Puebloan dwellings | 37.1572°N 108.4679°W | 6,755 feet (2,059 m) |
| Swan | Chaffee | ghost town | 38.6800°N 106.0420°W | 7,461 feet (2,274 m) |
| Swan | Summit | see Swan City | | |
| Swan City | Summit | former statutory town | 39.5233°N 105.9694°W | |
| Swandyke | Summit | ghost town | 39.5083°N 105.8922°W | |
| Swansea | Denver | see Elyria-Swansea, Denver | | |
| Sweetwater | Kiowa | former post office | | |
| Swift | Lincoln | former post office | | |
| Swinford | Adams | former post office | | |
| Swink | Otero | statutory town | 38.0145°N 103.6283°W | 4,121 feet (1,256 m) |
| Switzerland Park | Boulder | unincorporated community | 40.0014°N 105.4347°W | 7,589 feet (2,313 m) |
| Sylvanite | Chaffee | former post office | | |
| Sylvanite | San Juan | former post office | | |
| Symes | Jefferson | see South Platte, Jefferson County | | |

== T ==
Select the OpenStreetMap link at the right to view the location of places in this section.

| Place | County | Type | Location | Elevation |
|---|---|---|---|---|
| Tabasca | Las Animas | see Tabasco | | |
| Tabasco | Las Animas | former post office | | |
| Tabeguache | Huerfano | former post office | | |
| Tabernash | Grand | census-designated place | 39.9936°N 105.8431°W | 8,330 feet (2,539 m) |
| Table Mountain | Pueblo | former post office | | |
| Table Rock | El Paso | ghost town | | |
| Tabor | Arapahoe | former post office | | |
| Tabor | Boulder | Erie neighborhood | 40.0514°N 105.0741°W | 5,052 feet (1,540 m) |
| Tabor | Lake | former post office | | |
| Taclamur | Fremont | former post office | | |
| Tacoma | La Plata | unincorporated community | 37.5236°N 107.7820°W | 7,297 feet (2,224 m) |
| Tacoma | Lake | former post office | | |
| Tacony | Lake | former post office | | |
| Tailholt | Weld | see Severance | | |
| Tall Timber | Boulder | census-designated place | 40.0144°N 105.3517°W | 6,398 feet (1,950 m) |
| Talpa | Huerfano | see Farisita | | |
| Tamarac | Teller | Woodland Park neighborhood | | |
| Tanglewood Acres | Custer | unincorporated community | 38.0939°N 105.5617°W | 8,734 feet (2,662 m) |
| Tarryall (1859)‡ (Note: On November 28, 1859, the Provisional Government of the Territory of Jefferson created 12 counties, with Tarryall City as the seat of Park County, Jefferson Territory. On January 4, 1860, Tarryall City shortened its name to Tarryall. On November 1, 1861, the new Territory of Colorado created 17 original counties, with Tarryall as the original seat of Park County, Colorado Territory, serving until January 7, 1862.) | Park | see Tarryall City | | |
| Tarryall (1896) | Park | unincorporated community | 39.1219°N 105.4756°W | 8,714 feet (2,656 m) |
| Tarryall City‡ | Park | ghost town | | |
| Taylor | Eagle | see Cooper, Eagle County | | |
| Taylorville | Pueblo | former post office | | |
| Teller | Grand | former post office | | |
| Teller | Mineral | see Bachelor | | |
| Teller County | | county | 38.8822°N 105.1617°W | |
| Telluride† (Note: On July 26, 1880, Columbia changed its name to Telluride. Telluride has been the seat of San Miguel County, Colorado since the county was created on March 2, 1883.) | San Miguel | home rule town | 37.9375°N 107.8123°W | 8,793 feet (2,680 m) |
| Tellurium | Hinsdale | former post office | | |
| Templeton | El Paso | Colorado Springs neighborhood | | |
| Ten Mile | Summit | see Robinson | | |
| Tennessee Pass | Eagle | former post office | | |
| Tennessee Pass | Lake | former post office | | |
| Tennyson Park | Adams | Arvada neighborhood | 39.8111°N 105.0486°W | 5,308 feet (1,618 m) |
| Tercio | Las Animas | ghost town | 37.0520°N 104.9967°W | 7,736 feet (2,358 m) |
| Terrace | Conejos | former post office | | |
| Tetons | Saguache | former post office | | |
| Texas | Fremont | see Hillside | | |
| Texas Creek (1872) | Fremont | see Hillside | | |
| Texas Creek (1885) | Fremont | unincorporated community | 38.4131°N 105.5806°W | 6,194 feet (1,888 m) |
| Texas Ranch | Bent | former post office | | |
| Thatcher | Las Animas | unincorporated community | | |
| The Bluffs | Jefferson | unincorporated community | 39.5864°N 105.2261°W | 7,297 feet (2,224 m) |
| The Broadlands | Broomfield | Broomfield neighborhood | 39.9511°N 105.0289°W | 5,272 feet (1,607 m) |
| The Forks | Larimer | former post office | | |
| The Highlands | Jefferson | Arvada neighborhood | 39.8328°N 105.0683°W | 5,453 feet (1,662 m) |
| The Meadows | Bent | former post office | | |
| The Pinery | Douglas | census-designated place | 39.4553°N 104.7344°W | 6,247 feet (1,904 m) |
| The Pond | Jefferson | Arvada neighborhood | 39.8542°N 105.1056°W | 5,525 feet (1,684 m) |
| The Ridge At Stony Creek | Jefferson | unincorporated community | 39.5856°N 105.0942°W | 5,656 feet (1,724 m) |
| The Valley | Jefferson | unincorporated community | 39.5753°N 105.1628°W | 6,089 feet (1,856 m) |
| The Village at Castle Pines | Douglas | see Castle Pines Village | | |
| Thedalund | Adams | former post office | | |
| Theisen | Routt | former post office | | |
| Thistledown | Ouray | unincorporated community | 37.9936°N 107.6998°W | 8,730 feet (2,661 m) |
| Thomasville | Pitkin | ghost town | 39.3603°N 106.7025°W | 8,018 feet (2,444 m) |
| Thornburgh | Rio Blanco | unincorporated community | 40.2069°N 107.6959°W | 6,739 feet (2,054 m) |
| Thornton | Adams | home rule city | 39.8680°N 104.9719°W | 5,348 feet (1,630 m) |
| Thornton | Weld | home rule city | 39.8680°N 104.9719°W | 5,348 feet (1,630 m) |
| Thornton | Mineral | see Wagon Wheel Gap | | |
| Thunderbird Estates | Arapahoe | unincorporated community | 39.7144°N 104.7081°W | 5,571 feet (1,698 m) |
| Thurman | Washington | unincorporated community | 39.5961°N 103.2174°W | 4,951 feet (1,509 m) |
| Tiffany | La Plata | unincorporated community | 37.0328°N 107.5381°W | 6,342 feet (1,933 m) |
| Tiger | Summit | ghost town | 39.5228°N 105.9621°W | 9,669 feet (2,947 m) |
| Tigiwon | Eagle | ghost town | | |
| Tijeras | Las Animas | unincorporated community | 37.1259°N 104.6630°W | 6,358 feet (1,938 m) |
| Timber Hill | San Juan | former post office | | |
| Timberton | Park | former post office | | |
| Timnath | Larimer | home rule town | 40.5291°N 104.9853°W | 4,869 feet (1,484 m) |
| Timnath | Weld | home rule town | 40.5291°N 104.9853°W | 4,869 feet (1,484 m) |
| Timpas | Otero | unincorporated community | 37.8181°N 103.7741°W | 4,429 feet (1,350 m) |
| Tin Cup | Gunnison | see Tincup | | |
| Tincup | Gunnison | ghost town | 38.7544°N 106.4784°W | 10,157 feet (3,096 m) |
| Tinsdale | Jefferson | former post office | | |
| Tioga | Huerfano | ghost town | 37.6989°N 104.9275°W | 6,549 feet (1,996 m) |
| Tipperary | Weld | former post office | | |
| Tiptop | Gilpin | former post office | | |
| Tiptop | Grand | former post office | | |
| Titusville | Fremont | former post office | | |
| Tobe | Las Animas | unincorporated community | 37.2192°N 103.6116°W | 5,774 feet (1,760 m) |
| Tobin | Logan | unincorporated community | 40.8342°N 102.8727°W | 3,743 feet (1,141 m) |
| Todd Creek | Adams | census-designated place | 39.9780°N 104.8733°W | 5,052 feet (1,540 m) |
| Toledo | Prowers | former post office | | |
| Toliafero | Gunnison | former post office | | |
| Tolland | Gilpin | unincorporated community | 39.9050°N 105.5892°W | 8,921 feet (2,719 m) |
| Tollerburg | Las Animas | former post office | | |
| Tollgate | Arapahoe | Aurora neighborhood | 39.7003°N 104.7911°W | 5,525 feet (1,684 m) |
| Toltec | Huerfano | former post office | | |
| Toltec | La Plata | former post office | | |
| Tomah | Douglas | unincorporated community | 39.3019°N 104.8900°W | 6,440 feet (1,963 m) |
| Tomichi (Note: The name of Argenta was changed to Tomichi on August 23, 1880.) | Gunnison | former post office | | |
| Tomboy | San Miguel | ghost town | 37.9367°N 107.7545°W | 11,509 feet (3,508 m) |
| Tonville | Weld | unincorporated community | 40.0092°N 104.7039°W | 5,023 feet (1,531 m) |
| Toof | Fremont | see Beaver | | |
| Toonerville | Bent | unincorporated community | 37.7750°N 103.1641°W | 4,183 feet (1,275 m) |
| Toponas | Routt | unincorporated community | 40.0603°N 106.8081°W | 8,284 feet (2,525 m) |
| Tordal Estates | Summit | unincorporated community | 39.3845°N 106.0504°W | 10,653 feet (3,247 m) |
| Torres | Las Animas | unincorporated community | 37.0695°N 105.0561°W | 8,330 feet (2,539 m) |
| Torres | Rio Grande | unincorporated community | 37.6067°N 106.2045°W | 7,707 feet (2,349 m) |
| Torrington | Teller | former post office | | |
| Tosh | Routt | former post office | | |
| Touraine | Teller | former post office | | |
| Tourist (Note: In 1874, county voters selected Walsenburgh as the new seat of Huerfano County, Colorado Territory, and since statehood on August 1, 1876, the seat of Huerfano County, Colorado. On October 20, 1887, Walsenburgh changed its name to Tourist; then changed it back Walsenburgh on November 29, 1887; then shortened it to Walsenburg on December 22, 1892.) | Huerfano | see Walsenburg | | |
| Tourtellotte | Pitkin | former post office | | |
| Tourtellotte Park | Pitkin | former post office | | |
| Towaoc (Note: Towaoc, Colorado is the headquarters of the Ute Mountain Ute Tribe.) | Montezuma | census-designated place | 37.2044°N 108.7295°W | 5,912 feet (1,802 m) |
| Tower | Arapahoe | Aurora post office | | |
| Towner | Kiowa | census-designated place | 38.4704°N 102.0805°W | 3,930 feet (1,198 m) |
| Townsend | Washington | former post office | | |
| Townsite | Baca | see Carrizo | | |
| Trail Ridge | Larimer | former post office | 40.4405°N 105.7547°W | 11,770 feet (3,587 m) |
| Trail Side | Morgan | census-designated place | 40.2490°N 103.8432°W | 4,354 feet (1,327 m) |
| Trapper | Routt | unincorporated community | 40.1039°N 106.8798°W | 8,018 feet (2,444 m) |
| Travois | Arapahoe | unincorporated community | 39.5658°N 104.7394°W | 6,132 feet (1,869 m) |
| Treasure | Archuleta | unincorporated community | 37.3125°N 106.9656°W | 7,293 feet (2,223 m) |
| Trilby Corner | Larimer | unincorporated community | 40.4947°N 105.0775°W | 5,036 feet (1,535 m) |
| Trimble | La Plata | unincorporated community | 37.3903°N 107.8465°W | 6,578 feet (2,005 m) |
| Trinchera | Las Animas | unincorporated community | 37.0422°N 104.0475°W | 5,804 feet (1,769 m) |
| Trinidad† (Note: On February 9, 1866, the Territory of Colorado created Las Animas County, Colorado Territory with Trinidad as its seat until statehood on August 1, 1876, when it became the seat of Las Animas County, Colorado.) | Las Animas | home rule city | 37.1695°N 104.5005°W | 6,033 feet (1,839 m) |
| Troublesome | Grand | unincorporated community | 40.0608°N 106.2917°W | 7,362 feet (2,244 m) |
| Trout | Clear Creek | former post office | | |
| Trout | Ouray | former post office | | |
| Trout Creek | Routt | former post office | | |
| Trout Lake | San Miguel | see San Bernardo | | |
| Troutdale | Jefferson | unincorporated community | 39.6369°N 105.3480°W | 7,195 feet (2,193 m) |
| Troy | Las Animas | former post office | | |
| Truckton | El Paso | unincorporated community | 38.7381°N 104.1822°W | 6,024 feet (1,836 m) |
| Trujillo | Archuleta | unincorporated community | 37.1006°N 107.0470°W | 6,568 feet (2,002 m) |
| Trull | Routt | former post office | | |
| Trumbull | Jefferson | unincorporated community | 39.2630°N 105.2194°W | 6,394 feet (1,949 m) |
| Trump | Park | ghost town | 38.8492°N 105.7883°W | 9,436 feet (2,876 m) |
| Truro | Park | former post office | | |
| Tuck | Baca | former post office | | |
| Tucker | Gunnison | former post office | | |
| Tuckerville | La Plata | ghost town | 37.4925°N 107.4853°W | 10,653 feet (3,247 m) |
| Tumichi | Gunnison | see Parlin | | |
| Tungsten | Boulder | ghost town | 39.9719°N 105.4761°W | 7,992 feet (2,436 m) |
| Tunnel | Mesa | former post office | | |
| Turkey Creek | El Paso | see Lytle | | |
| Turkey Creek | Jefferson | former post office | | |
| Turner | Gunnison | former post office | | |
| Turret | Chaffee | ghost town | 38.6403°N 105.9889°W | 8,537 feet (2,602 m) |
| Tuttle | Kit Carson | ghost town | 39.4974°N 102.5109°W | 4,022 feet (1,226 m) |
| Twelve Mile | Grand | former post office | | |
| Twelvemile Corner | Morgan | unincorporated community | 40.0733°N 103.7927°W | 4,495 feet (1,370 m) |
| Twin Cedars | Douglas | unincorporated community | 39.3597°N 105.1672°W | 6,207 feet (1,892 m) |
| Twin Forks | Jefferson | unincorporated community | 39.5928°N 105.2197°W | 6,896 feet (2,102 m) |
| Twin Lakes | Adams | census-designated place | 39.8250°N 105.0047°W | 5,246 feet (1,599 m) |
| Twin Lakes | Lake | census-designated place | 39.1037°N 106.3190°W | 9,600 feet (2,926 m) |
| Twin Mills | Logan | unincorporated community | 40.5736°N 103.1263°W | 4,199 feet (1,280 m) |
| Twin Spruce | Jefferson | unincorporated community | 39.8892°N 105.3586°W | 7,982 feet (2,433 m) |
| Two Buttes | Baca | statutory town | 37.5611°N 102.3977°W | 4,111 feet (1,253 m) |
| Tyler | Douglas | former post office | | |
| Tyner | Jackson | former post office | | |
| Tyrone | Las Animas | unincorporated community | 37.4542°N 104.2083°W | 5,541 feet (1,689 m) |

== U ==
Select the OpenStreetMap link at the right to view the location of places in this section.

| Place | County | Type | Location | Elevation |
|---|---|---|---|---|
| U.S. Air Force Academy | El Paso | see the United States Air Force Academy | | |
| Ula‡ (Note: Ula served as the original seat of Custer County, Colorado since the county was created on March 9, 1877, until 1878.) | Custer | ghost town | 38.1501°N 105.5019°W | 7,802 feet (2,378 m) |
| Una | Garfield | unincorporated community | 39.3997°N 108.1087°W | 5,016 feet (1,529 m) |
| Unaweep | Mesa | former post office | | |
| Uncapaghre | San Juan | see Uncompahgre, San Juan County | | |
| Uncompahgre | Montrose | unincorporated community | 38.3780°N 107.8187°W | 6,165 feet (1,879 m) |
| Uncompahgre | San Juan | former post office | | |
| Uncompahgre City | Ouray | see Ouray | | |
| Undercliffe | Pueblo | former post office | | |
| Underhill | Costilla | former post office | | |
| Uneva Lake | Summit | former statutory town | 39.5538°N 106.1424°W | |
| Union | Morgan | unincorporated community | 40.3766°N 103.5011°W | 4,127 feet (1,258 m) |
| United States Air Force Academy | El Paso | U.S. Air Force university | 38.9985°N 104.8541°W | 6,841 feet (2,085 m) |
| University | Denver | Denver neighborhood | | |
| University Hills | Denver | Denver neighborhood | 39.6653°N 104.9472°W | 5,410 feet (1,649 m) |
| University Park | Denver | Denver neighborhood | 39.6786°N 104.9694°W | 5,341 feet (1,628 m) |
| Upper Bear Creek | Clear Creek | census-designated place | 39.6319°N 105.4154°W | 7,536 feet (2,297 m) |
| Upper Witter Gulch | Clear Creek | census-designated place | 39.6602°N 105.4280°W | 8,205 feet (2,501 m) |
| Uranium | Montrose | ghost town | | |
| Uravan | Montrose | ghost town | 38.3683°N 108.7365°W | 4,990 feet (1,521 m) |
| Urmston | Jefferson | former post office | | |
| Utaline | Mesa | unincorporated community | 39.1269°N 109.0423°W | 4,669 feet (1,423 m) |
| Ute | Huerfano | see Huerfano, Huerfano County | | |
| Ute (Note: On May 26, 1882, Ute changed its name to Grand Junction. Grand Junction has been the seat of Mesa County, Colorado since the county was created on February 11, 1883.) | Mesa | see Grand Junction | | |
| Ute | Montrose | unincorporated community | 38.2555°N 108.2712°W | 7,569 feet (2,307 m) |
| Utleyville | Baca | unincorporated community | 37.2711°N 103.0313°W | 5,144 feet (1,568 m) |

== V ==
Select the OpenStreetMap link at the right to view the location of places in this section.

| Place | County | Type | Location | Elevation |
|---|---|---|---|---|
| Vadner | Conejos | former post office | | |
| Vail | Eagle | home rule town | 39.6403°N 106.3742°W | 8,189 feet (2,496 m) |
| Valdai | Jackson | former post office | | |
| Valdez | Las Animas | census-designated place | 37.1229°N 104.6907°W | 6,499 feet (1,981 m) |
| Valdora | Summit | see Valdoro | | |
| Valdoro | Summit | former statutory town | 39.7112°N 105.0110°W | |
| Valentine | Larimer | Loveland post office | 40.3978°N 105.0750°W | 4,987 feet (1,520 m) |
| Vallecito | La Plata | unincorporated community | 37.3753°N 107.5839°W | 7,582 feet (2,311 m) |
| Vallery | Morgan | former post office | | |
| Valley | Kit Carson | former post office | | |
| Valley View | Pueblo | unincorporated community | 38.0683°N 104.9769°W | 6,286 feet (1,916 m) |
| Vallie | Fremont | unincorporated community | 38.3942°N 105.7725°W | 6,522 feet (1,988 m) |
| Vallorso | Las Animas | unincorporated community | 37.2828°N 104.6450°W | 6,791 feet (2,070 m) |
| Valmont | Boulder | census-designated place | 40.0342°N 105.2065°W | 5,161 feet (1,573 m) |
| Valverde (Note: On December 1, 1902, the newly created City and County of Denver annexed the towns of Argo, Berkeley, Elyria, Globeville, Montclair, and Valverde.) | Denver | Denver neighborhood | | |
| Vanadium | San Miguel | unincorporated community | 37.9669°N 107.9717°W | 7,743 feet (2,360 m) |
| Vance | San Miguel | former post office | | |
| Vance Junction | San Miguel | unincorporated community | 37.9355°N 107.8987°W | 8,100 feet (2,469 m) |
| Vancorum | Montrose | unincorporated community | 38.2317°N 108.5956°W | 5,341 feet (1,628 m) |
| Vansville | Kit Carson | former post office | | |
| Varros | Las Animas | former post office | | |
| Vastine | Rio Grande | unincorporated community | 37.6344°N 106.1034°W | 7,648 feet (2,331 m) |
| Vega | Mesa | former post office | | |
| Vega Ranch | Las Animas | former post office | | |
| Velasquez Plaza | Las Animas | unincorporated community | 37.1236°N 104.7825°W | 6,729 feet (2,051 m) |
| Verde | Pueblo | former post office | | |
| Verdun | Prowers | former post office | | |
| Vermilion | Jefferson | see Foxton | | |
| Vernal | Montrose | unincorporated community | 38.3897°N 107.8292°W | 6,115 feet (1,864 m) |
| Verne | Delta | former post office | | |
| Vernon | Yuma | census-designated place | 39.9400°N 102.3074°W | 3,875 feet (1,181 m) |
| Vernon Gardens | Jefferson | unincorporated community | 39.7325°N 105.1883°W | 5,856 feet (1,785 m) |
| Vesuvius | Boulder | former post office | | |
| Veta Pass | Huerfano | ghost town | 37.5931°N 105.2033°W | 9,390 feet (2,862 m) |
| Veta Pass | Costilla | ghost town | 37.5931°N 105.2033°W | 9,390 feet (2,862 m) |
| Veteran | Saguache | former post office | | |
| Viceto | La Plata | see Vallecito | | |
| Vicksburg | Chaffee | unincorporated community | 38.9992°N 106.3778°W | 9,672 feet (2,948 m) |
| Victor | Teller | statutory city | 38.7100°N 105.1400°W | 9,708 feet (2,959 m) |
| Viejo San Acacio | Costilla | unincorporated community | 37.2028°N 105.5083°W | 7,795 feet (2,376 m) |
| Vigil | Las Animas | unincorporated community | 37.1611°N 104.9417°W | 7,365 feet (2,245 m) |
| Vilas | Baca | statutory town | 37.3736°N 102.4463°W | 4,154 feet (1,266 m) |
| Villa Grove | Saguache | unincorporated community | 38.2486°N 105.9492°W | 7,982 feet (2,433 m) |
| Villa Park | Denver | Denver neighborhood | | |
| Village | Otero | former post office | | |
| Village East | Arapahoe | Aurora neighborhood | 39.6833°N 104.8508°W | 5,558 feet (1,694 m) |
| Village Green | Arapahoe | Aurora neighborhood | 39.6939°N 104.8136°W | 5,561 feet (1,695 m) |
| Village of Five Parks | Jefferson | Arvada neighborhood | 39.8486°N 105.1597°W | 5,696 feet (1,736 m) |
| Village Pines | Douglas | unincorporated community | 39.3800°N 104.7239°W | 6,417 feet (1,956 m) |
| Villagrove | Saguache | see Villa Grove | | |
| Villapark | Denver | see Villa Park | | |
| Villegreen | Las Animas | unincorporated community | 37.3059°N 103.5202°W | 5,643 feet (1,720 m) |
| Vim | Weld | former post office | | |
| Vineland | Pueblo | census-designated place | 38.2447°N 104.4599°W | 4,646 feet (1,416 m) |
| Viola | Las Animas | unincorporated community | 37.1334°N 104.6005°W | 6,234 feet (1,900 m) |
| Virginia | Douglas | see Rock Ridge | | |
| Virginia | Gunnison | see Tincup | | |
| Virginia City | Gunnison | see Tincup | | |
| Virginia Dale | Larimer | unincorporated community | | |
| Virginia Vale | Denver | see Washington Virginia Vale, Denver | | |
| Virginia Village | Denver | Denver neighborhood | | |
| Virginius | Ouray | former post office | | |
| Vista Pointe | Douglas | unincorporated community | 39.5398°N 104.8342°W | 5,915 feet (1,803 m) |
| Vollmar | Weld | unincorporated community | 40.1350°N 104.8389°W | 4,872 feet (1,485 m) |
| Vona | Kit Carson | statutory town | 39.3036°N 102.7430°W | 4,505 feet (1,373 m) |
| Vroman | Otero | unincorporated community | 38.0897°N 103.8102°W | 4,236 feet (1,291 m) |
| Vulcan | Garfield | former post office | | |
| Vulcan | Gunnison | ghost town | 38.3455°N 107.0014°W | 8,924 feet (2,720 m) |

== W ==
Select the OpenStreetMap link at the right to view the location of places in this section.

| Place | County | Type | Location | Elevation |
|---|---|---|---|---|
| Wabash | Saguache | see Gibson | | |
| Wachtel | Weld | former post office | | |
| Wadleigh | Park | former post office | | |
| Wages | Yuma | former post office | | |
| Wagon Wheel Gap | Mineral | unincorporated community | | |
| Wah Keeney Park | Jefferson | unincorporated community | 39.6603°N 105.3405°W | 7,464 feet (2,275 m) |
| Wait | Crowley | see Sugar City | | |
| Waitley | Washington | former post office | | |
| Wakeman | Phillips | former post office | | |
| Walden† (Note: Walden has been the seat of Jackson County, Colorado since the county was created on May 5, 1909.) | Jackson | statutory town | 40.7316°N 106.2836°W | 8,097 feet (2,468 m) |
| Wales | Yuma | former post office | | |
| Walker | Weld | unincorporated community | 40.2644°N 104.9522°W | 4,974 feet (1,516 m) |
| Wall Rock | Moffat | former post office | | |
| Wallace Village | Jefferson | Westminster neighborhood | 39.8833°N 105.0928°W | 5,394 feet (1,644 m) |
| Wallett | Kit Carson | former post office | | |
| Walls | La Plata | former post office | | |
| Wallstreet | Boulder | unincorporated community | 40.0389°N 105.3908°W | 6,883 feet (2,098 m) |
| Walnut Grove | Jefferson | Westminster neighborhood | 39.8878°N 105.1033°W | 5,394 feet (1,644 m) |
| Walsen | Huerfano | former post office | | |
| Walsenburg† | Huerfano | statutory town | 37.6242°N 104.7803°W | 6,171 feet (1,881 m) |
| Walsenburgh | Huerfano | see Walsenburg | | |
| Walsh | Baca | statutory town | 37.3861°N 102.2782°W | 3,953 feet (1,205 m) |
| Waltonia | Larimer | unincorporated community | 40.4139°N 105.3630°W | 6,512 feet (1,985 m) |
| Walts Corner | Las Animas | unincorporated community | 37.1689°N 103.8800°W | 5,801 feet (1,768 m) |
| Wandcrest Park | Jefferson | unincorporated community | 39.4355°N 105.3939°W | 8,264 feet (2,519 m) |
| Wandering View | Adams | Westminster neighborhood | 39.8883°N 105.0303°W | 5,466 feet (1,666 m) |
| Wapiti | Summit | former statutory town | | |
| Ward | Boulder | home rule town | 40.0722°N 105.5083°W | 9,144 feet (2,787 m) |
| Ward District | Boulder | see Ward | | |
| Wareland | Bent | unincorporated community | 39.0925°N 103.2158°W | 5,322 feet (1,622 m) |
| Waremont | Pueblo | former post office | | |
| Wareville | San Miguel | former post office | | |
| Warrantsville | Huerfano | former post office | | |
| Warren | Weld | unincorporated community | 40.9597°N 104.8922°W | 5,922 feet (1,805 m) |
| Warwick | Prowers | unincorporated community | 38.1239°N 102.2741°W | 3,586 feet (1,093 m) |
| Washburn | Adams | see Hazeltine | | |
| Washington County | | county | 39.9704°N 103.2016°W | |
| Washington Park | Denver | Denver neighborhood | | |
| Washington Park West | Denver | Denver neighborhood | | |
| Washington Virginia Vale | Denver | Denver neighborhood | | |
| Wason‡ (Note: Wason served eight months as the original seat of Mineral County, Colorado, from the creation of the county on March 27, 1893, until November 7 that year.) | Mineral | ghost town | | |
| Water Valley | Kiowa | former post office | | |
| Waterman | Garfield | former post office | | |
| Waterton | Jefferson | unincorporated community | 39.4936°N 105.0886°W | 5,482 feet (1,671 m) |
| Watervale | Las Animas | former post office | | |
| Watkins | Arapahoe | census-designated place | 39.7453°N 104.6075°W | 5,525 feet (1,684 m) |
| Watkins | Adams | census-designated place | | 5,525 feet (1,684 m) |
| Watonga | Saguache | former post office | | |
| Watson | Pitkin | see Gerbazdale | | |
| Wattenberg | Weld | unincorporated community | 40.0278°N 104.8366°W | 4,938 feet (1,505 m) |
| Wauneta | Yuma | unincorporated community | 40.2930°N 102.2546°W | 3,724 feet (1,135 m) |
| Waunita | Gunnison | see Waunita Hot Springs | | |
| Waunita Hot Springs | Gunnison | unincorporated community | 38.5142°N 106.5084°W | 8,957 feet (2,730 m) |
| Waverly | Alamosa | unincorporated community | 37.4297°N 106.0061°W | 7,589 feet (2,313 m) |
| Waverly | El Paso | former post office | | |
| Waverly | Larimer | unincorporated community | 40.7364°N 105.0766°W | 5,322 feet (1,622 m) |
| Wayne | El Paso | former post office | | |
| Wayside | Costilla | former post office | | |
| Weaver | Mineral | ghost town | 37.8839°N 106.9312°W | 9,862 feet (3,006 m) |
| Webb | Prowers | former post office | | |
| Weber | Montezuma | unincorporated community | 37.3125°N 108.2892°W | 7,152 feet (2,180 m) |
| Webster | Park | ghost town | 39.4575°N 105.7203°W | 9,042 feet (2,756 m) |
| Weir | Sedgwick | see Julesburg | | |
| Weissport | El Paso | see Palmer Lake | | |
| Weitzer | Otero | see Vroman | | |
| Welby | Adams | census-designated place | 39.8367°N 104.9591°W | 5,135 feet (1,565 m) |
| Welcome | Delta | former post office | | |
| Weld (1869) | Weld | see Fort Lupton | | |
| Weld (1900) | Weld | former post office | | |
| Weld County | | county | 40.5542°N 104.3938°W | |
| Weldon Valley | Morgan | former post office | | |
| Weldona | Morgan | census-designated place | 40.3484°N 103.9694°W | 4,354 feet (1,327 m) |
| Weller | Park | unincorporated community | 39.4475°N 105.6206°W | 8,461 feet (2,579 m) |
| Wellington | Larimer | statutory town | 40.7039°N 105.0086°W | 5,203 feet (1,586 m) |
| Wellington Downs | Jefferson | Arvada neighborhood | 39.8072°N 105.0578°W | 5,315 feet (1,620 m) |
| Wellons | Lincoln | former post office | | |
| Wellshire | Denver | Denver neighborhood | 39.6717°N 104.9689°W | 5,335 feet (1,626 m) |
| Wellsville | Fremont | unincorporated community | 38.4867°N 105.9100°W | 6,893 feet (2,101 m) |
| Welty | Weld | unincorporated community | 40.3278°N 105.0178°W | 5,033 feet (1,534 m) |
| Wenger | Las Animas | see Menger | | |
| Wentworth | Baca | former post office | | |
| Wentz | Weld | former post office | | |
| West Beaver Park | Teller | see Gillett | | |
| West Burlington | Kit Carson | unincorporated community | 39.3033°N 102.3096°W | 4,196 feet (1,279 m) |
| West Colfax | Denver | Denver neighborhood | | |
| West Creek | Douglas | see Westcreek | | |
| West End (Note: This note perstains to Old Colorado City and mentions west side, not "West End", and there's no GNIS record for "West End", posted this comment March 13, 2024. On November 28, 1859, the Provisional Government of the Territory of Jefferson created 12 counties, with Colorado City as the seat of El Paso County, Jefferson Territory. On November 1, 1861, the new Territory of Colorado created 17 original counties, with Colorado City as the original seat of El Paso County, Colorado Territory. Colorado City served as the second capital of the Colorado Territory from July 7, 1862, until August 14, 1862. In 1873, county voters moved the county seat to Colorado Springs. On June 10, 1917, the City of Colorado Springs annexed Colorado City.) | El Paso | Colorado Springs neighborhood | | |
| West Farm | Prowers | unincorporated community | 38.0928°N 102.5585°W | 3,589 feet (1,094 m) |
| West Highlands | Denver | Denver neighborhood | | |
| West Las Animas | Bent | see Las Animas | | |
| West Meadows | Jefferson | unincorporated community | 39.6078°N 105.1392°W | 5,850 feet (1,783 m) |
| West Pleasant View | Jefferson | census-designated place | 39.7319°N 105.1784°W | 5,823 feet (1,775 m) |
| West Portal | Grand | see Hideaway Park | | |
| West Vail | Eagle | Vail neighborhood | 39.6303°N 106.4148°W | 7,936 feet (2,419 m) |
| West Vancorum | Montrose | unincorporated community | 38.2278°N 108.6006°W | 5,404 feet (1,647 m) |
| Westcliffe† (Note: Westcliffe has served as the seat of Custer County, Colorado since 1928.) | Custer | statutory town | 38.1347°N 105.4658°W | 7,867 feet (2,398 m) |
| Westcreek | Douglas | census-designated place | 39.1525°N 105.1636°W | 7,484 feet (2,281 m) |
| Western Hills | Adams | unincorporated community | 39.8322°N 104.9972°W | 5,253 feet (1,601 m) |
| Westfork | Montezuma | former post office | | |
| Westgate | Jefferson | Lakewood neighborhood | 39.6711°N 105.0931°W | 5,456 feet (1,663 m) |
| Westhaven | Jefferson | Wheat Ridge neighborhood | 39.7675°N 105.1050°W | 5,433 feet (1,656 m) |
| Westlake | Larimer | former post office | | |
| Westminster | Adams | home rule city | 39.8367°N 105.0372°W | 5,381 feet (1,640 m) |
| Westminster | Jefferson | home rule city | 39.8367°N 105.0372°W | 5,381 feet (1,640 m) |
| Westminster Hills | Adams | Westminster neighborhood | 39.8450°N 105.0458°W | 5,404 feet (1,647 m) |
| Weston | Las Animas | census-designated place | 37.1459°N 104.8683°W | 7,067 feet (2,154 m) |
| Weston | Park | former post office | | |
| Westplains | Logan | unincorporated community | 40.8647°N 103.4977°W | 4,350 feet (1,326 m) |
| West Highland | Denver | Denver neighborhood | | |
| Westview | Adams | Westminster neighborhood | 39.8908°N 105.0014°W | 5,417 feet (1,651 m) |
| Westwood | Denver | Denver neighborhood | | |
| Wetmore | Custer | unincorporated community | 38.2381°N 105.0847°W | 6,086 feet (1,855 m) |
| Wezel | Lincoln | ghost town | 38.7983°N 103.4547°W | 4,797 feet (1,462 m) |
| Wheat Ridge | Jefferson | home rule city | 39.7661°N 105.0772°W | 5,459 feet (1,664 m) |
| Wheatland | El Paso | former post office | | |
| Wheatland | Larimer | former post office | | |
| Wheeler | Summit | see Copper Mountain | | |
| Wheelman | Boulder | unincorporated community | 40.0036°N 105.3739°W | 6,339 feet (1,932 m) |
| Whispering Pine | Boulder | unincorporated community | 39.9697°N 105.4858°W | 8,392 feet (2,558 m) |
| White | Lincoln | former post office | | |
| White Cross | Hinsdale | former post office | | |
| White Earth | Saguache | former post office | | |
| White Pine | Gunnison | see Whitepine | | |
| White River | Rio Blanco | former post office | | |
| White River | Summit | former post office | | |
| White River City | Rio Blanco | unincorporated community | 40.0908°N 108.2243°W | 5,741 feet (1,750 m) |
| White Rock | Pueblo | former post office | | |
| Whitecross | Hinsdale | ghost town | | |
| Whitehorn | Fremont | unincorporated community | 38.6439°N 105.8783°W | 9,337 feet (2,846 m) |
| Whitepine | Gunnison | unincorporated community | 38.5417°N 106.3936°W | 9,711 feet (2,960 m) |
| Whiterock | Pueblo | unincorporated community | 37.8658°N 104.1144°W | 4,715 feet (1,437 m) |
| Whitewater | Mesa | unincorporated community | 38.9911°N 108.4534°W | 4,646 feet (1,416 m) |
| Whitman | Weld | former post office | | |
| Whitney | Boulder | former post office | | |
| Whittier | Denver | Denver neighborhood | | |
| Wide Acres | Arapahoe | Littleton neighborhood | 39.5683°N 105.0344°W | 5,371 feet (1,637 m) |
| Wideawake | Gilpin | ghost town | 39.8500°N 105.5217°W | 9,364 feet (2,854 m) |
| Widefield | El Paso | unincorporated community | 38.7333°N 104.7200°W | 5,682 feet (1,732 m) |
| Wiggins | Morgan | statutory town | 40.2305°N 104.0727°W | 4,554 feet (1,388 m) |
| Wigwam | El Paso | unincorporated community | 38.5394°N 104.6355°W | 5,223 feet (1,592 m) |
| Wiladel | Washington | unincorporated community | 39.7430°N 103.0099°W | 4,596 feet (1,401 m) |
| Wilbur | Fremont | former post office | | |
| Wild Horse | Chaffee | former post office | | |
| Wild Horse | Cheyenne | unincorporated community | 38.8258°N 103.0116°W | 4,475 feet (1,364 m) |
| Wild Horse | Pueblo | unincorporated community | 38.3292°N 104.6686°W | 4,885 feet (1,489 m) |
| Wildcat | Weld | unincorporated community | 40.2591°N 104.8847°W | 4,770 feet (1,454 m) |
| Wilde | Prowers | former post office | | |
| Wilds | Larimer | former post office | | |
| Wildwood | Jefferson | Wheat Ridge neighborhood | 39.7706°N 105.1025°W | 5,404 feet (1,647 m) |
| Wiley | Prowers | statutory town | 38.1542°N 102.7196°W | 3,737 feet (1,139 m) |
| Willard | Logan | unincorporated community | 40.5544°N 103.4863°W | 4,337 feet (1,322 m) |
| Willey Lumber Camp | Jackson | unincorporated community | 40.5028°N 105.8992°W | 9,678 feet (2,950 m) |
| Williamsburg | Fremont | statutory town | 38.3819°N 105.1519°W | 5,390 feet (1,643 m) |
| Williamsburgh | Fremont | see Williamsburg | | |
| Will-O-The-Wisp | Park | unincorporated community | 39.4614°N 105.4103°W | 8,373 feet (2,552 m) |
| Willow | Mineral | see Creede | | |
| Willow Brook | Jefferson | unincorporated community | 39.6078°N 105.1706°W | 6,037 feet (1,840 m) |
| Willow Creek | Arapahoe | Centennial neighborhood | 39.5731°N 104.8947°W | 5,728 feet (1,746 m) |
| Willow Creek | Routt | former post office | | |
| Willow Gulch | Dolores | former post office | | |
| Willow Park | Arapahoe | Aurora neighborhood | 39.6861°N 104.8144°W | 5,558 feet (1,694 m) |
| Willow Springs | Jefferson | unincorporated community | 39.6117°N 105.1811°W | 6,165 feet (1,879 m) |
| Willowville | Jefferson | former post office | | |
| Wilson | Pueblo | former post office | | |
| Wilson | San Miguel | former post office | | |
| Wilson Place | Moffat | unincorporated community | 40.7619°N 108.8937°W | 5,338 feet (1,627 m) |
| Windham | Ouray | former post office | | |
| Windsor | Denver | Denver neighborhood | | |
| Windsor | Moffat | see Craig | | |
| Windsor | Weld | home rule town | 40.4775°N 104.9014°W | 4,797 feet (1,462 m) |
| Windsor | Larimer | home rule town | 40.4775°N 104.9014°W | 4,797 feet (1,462 m) |
| Windy Hills | Douglas | unincorporated community | 39.4856°N 104.6876°W | 6,378 feet (1,944 m) |
| Winfield | Chaffee | ghost town | 38.9847°N 106.4409°W | 10,243 feet (3,122 m) |
| Wingo | Pitkin | unincorporated community | 39.3458°N 107.0103°W | 6,768 feet (2,063 m) |
| Winnview | Arapahoe | former post office | | |
| Winona | Larimer | former post office | | |
| Winston | Logan | former post office | | |
| Winter Park | Grand | home rule town | 39.8917°N 105.7631°W | 9,052 feet (2,759 m) |
| Witherbee | Yuma | former post office | | |
| Wolcott | Eagle | census-designated place | 39.7035°N 106.6800°W | 7,044 feet (2,147 m) |
| Wolf Creek | Elbert | former post office | | |
| Wolhurst | Arapahoe | Littleton neighborhood | 39.5705°N 105.0333°W | 5,371 feet (1,637 m) |
| Wondervu | Boulder | unincorporated community | 39.9255°N 105.3950°W | 8,629 feet (2,630 m) |
| Wood Creek | Jefferson | Westminster neighborhood | 39.8342°N 105.0578°W | 5,354 feet (1,632 m) |
| Wood Run | Jefferson | Arvada neighborhood | 39.8467°N 105.1042°W | 5,518 feet (1,682 m) |
| Wood Valley | Pueblo | former post office | | |
| Woodgate | Arapahoe | Aurora neighborhood | 39.6272°N 104.8142°W | 5,719 feet (1,743 m) |
| Woodland Park | Teller | home rule city | 38.9939°N 105.0569°W | 8,481 feet (2,585 m) |
| Woodmen | El Paso | former post office | | |
| Woodmoor | El Paso | census-designated place | 39.1014°N 104.8475°W | 7,244 feet (2,208 m) |
| Woodrim | Arapahoe | Aurora neighborhood | 39.6783°N 104.8167°W | 5,597 feet (1,706 m) |
| Woodrow | Washington | unincorporated community | 39.9883°N 103.5916°W | 4,491 feet (1,369 m) |
| Woodstock | Gunnison | former post office | | |
| Woody Creek | Pitkin | census-designated place | 39.2709°N 106.8883°W | 7,290 feet (2,222 m) |
| Wootton | Las Animas | former post office | | |
| Wormington | Las Animas | see Simpson | | |
| Wortman | Lake | ghost town | 39.3570°N 106.1727°W | 10,997 feet (3,352 m) |
| Wray† (Note: Wray has served as the seat of Yuma County, Colorado since 1902.) | Yuma | home rule city | 40.0758°N 102.2232°W | 3,563 feet (1,086 m) |
| Wulstenville | Custer | former post office | | |

== Y ==
Select the OpenStreetMap link at the right to view the location of places in this section.

| Place | County | Type | Location | Elevation |
|---|---|---|---|---|
| Yale | Kit Carson | former post office | | |
| Yampa (Note: On August 28, 1889, Yampa changed its name to Craig. Craig has been the seat of Moffat County, Colorado since the county was created on February 27, 1911.) | Moffat | see Craig | | |
| Yampa | Routt | statutory town | 40.1525°N 106.9087°W | 7,881 feet (2,402 m) |
| Yankee | Clear Creek | ghost town | 39.8264°N 105.6239°W | 10,951 feet (3,338 m) |
| Yankee Hill | Gilpin | former post office | | |
| Yarmony | Routt | former post office | | |
| Yates | Clear Creek | see Bakerville | | |
| Yeiser | Las Animas | former post office | | |
| Yellow Jacket | Montezuma | unincorporated community | 37.5344°N 108.7173°W | 6,900 feet (2,103 m) |
| Yellowstone Creek | Huerfano | former post office | | |
| Yetta | Las Animas | see Tyrone | | |
| Yoder | El Paso | unincorporated community | 38.8394°N 104.2219°W | 6,145 feet (1,873 m) |
| Yoman | Elbert | former post office | | |
| Yorktown | Clear Creek | former post office | | |
| Yorkville | Fremont | unincorporated community | 38.2922°N 105.2903°W | 7,815 feet (2,382 m) |
| Youghal | Moffat | former post office | | |
| Young | La Plata | former post office | | |
| Yuma‡ (Note: Yuma served as the original seat of Yuma County, Colorado from the creation of the county on March 15, 1889, until 1902.) | Yuma | home rule city | 40.1222°N 102.7252°W | 4,137 feet (1,261 m) |
| Yuma County | | county | 40.0022°N 102.4243°W | |
| Yachita | Las Animas | former post office | | |

== Z ==
Select the OpenStreetMap link at the right to view the location of places in this section.

| Place | County | Type | Location | Elevation |
|---|---|---|---|---|
| Zamara | Las Animas | unincorporated community | 37.1539°N 104.9206°W | 7,182 feet (2,189 m) |
| Zapato | Alamosa | former post office | | |
| Zilar | Weld | former post office | | |
| Zinzer | Rio Grande | unincorporated community | 37.5603°N 106.0945°W | 7,635 feet (2,327 m) |
| Zirkel | Jackson | former post office | | |
| Zita | Weld | see Galeton | | |
| Zuck | Prowers | see Barton | | |

Colorado populated places: A B C D E F G H I J K L M N O P Q R S T U V W X Y Z

== See also ==
- Bibliography of Colorado
- Geography of Colorado
- History of Colorado
- Index of Colorado-related articles
- List of Colorado-related lists
  - List of adjectivals and demonyms for Colorado cities
  - List of census-designated places in Colorado
  - List of counties in Colorado
  - List of county seats in Colorado
  - List of forts in Colorado
  - List of ghost towns in Colorado
  - List of municipalities in Colorado
  - List of post offices in Colorado
- Outline of Colorado
