= Jim Corrigan (disambiguation) =

Jim Corrigan is a character in DC Comics.

Jim Corrigan may also refer to:

- Jim Corrigan (basketball) (born 1958), American basketball coach
- Jimmy Corrigan, the Smartest Kid on Earth, a graphic novel by Chris Ware
- Jim Corrigan, a character on T. J. Hooker

== See also ==
- Jim Carrigan (judge) (1929–2014), United States federal judge
- James Corrigan
