= James Carrigan =

James or Jim Carrigan may refer to:

- Jim Carrigan (judge) (1929–2014), United States federal judge
- James J. Carrigan (born 1941), American attorney and politician

== See also ==
- James Corrigan
