= Nina Y. Wang =

American judge (born 1972)

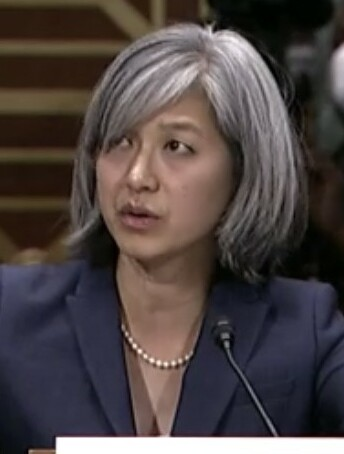

Judge of the United States District Court for the District of Colorado
- Incumbent
- Assumed office July 22, 2022
- Appointed by: Joe Biden
- Preceded by: Christine Arguello

Magistrate Judge of the United States District Court for the District of Colorado
- In office February 9, 2015 – July 22, 2022

Personal details
- Born: 1972 (age 53–54) Taipei, Taiwan
- Education: Washington University in St. Louis (BA); Harvard University (JD)

Nina Nin-Yuen Wang (born 1972) is a Taiwan-born lawyer serving as a United States district judge of the United States District Court for the District of Colorado. She previously served as a United States magistrate judge of the same court.

== Early life ==
Nina Y. Wang is an immigrant from Taiwan. She earned a Bachelor of Arts from the Washington University in St. Louis in 1994 and a Juris Doctor from Harvard Law School in 1997.

== Career ==
Wang began her career as an associate at Fried, Frank, Harris, Shriver & Jacobson. From 1999 to 2000, Wang served as a law clerk for Judge Peter J. Messitte of the United States District Court for the District of Maryland. From 2000 to 2004, she served as an Assistant United States Attorney in the United States Attorney's Office for the District of Colorado. She was an associate at Faegre Drinker from 2004 to 2008 and partner until 2015. In private practice, Wang focused on copyright and intellectual property law.

Wang cofounded the Colorado Pro Bono Patent Initiative. She also previously served as president of the Asian Pacific American Bar Association of Colorado.

=== Federal judicial service ===
Wang served as a magistrate judge of the United States District Court for the District of Colorado from February 9, 2015, to July 22, 2022.

On January 19, 2022, President Joe Biden nominated Wang to serve as a United States district judge of the United States District Court for the District of Colorado. President Biden nominated Wang to the seat being vacated by Judge Christine Arguello, who subsequently assumed senior status on July 15, 2022. On May 25, 2022, a hearing on her nomination was held before the Senate Judiciary Committee. On June 16, 2022, her nomination was reported out of committee by a 14–8 vote. On July 18, 2022, the United States Senate invoked cloture on her nomination by a 52–33 vote. On July 19, 2022, her nomination was confirmed by a 58–36 vote. She received her judicial commission on July 22, 2022.

== See also ==
- List of Asian American jurists

Legal offices
Preceded by Christine Arguello	Judge of the United States District Court for the District of Colorado; 2022–present	Incumbent
