= Christine Arguello =

American judge (born 1955)

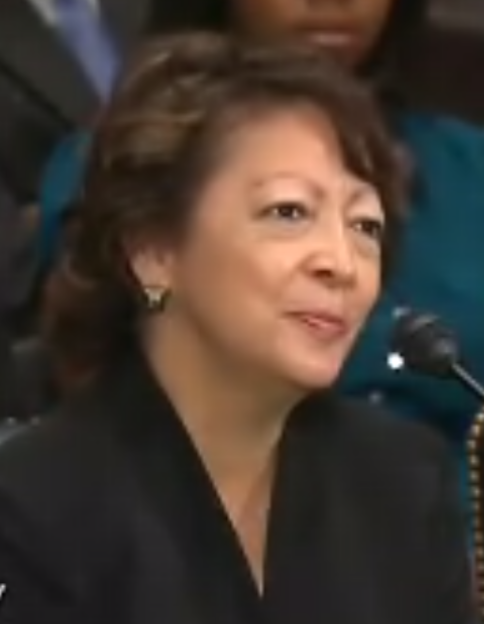

Senior Judge of the United States District Court for the District of Colorado
- Incumbent
- Assumed office July 15, 2022

Judge of the United States District Court for the District of Colorado
- In office October 21, 2008 – July 15, 2022
- Appointed by: George W. Bush
- Preceded by: Walker David Miller
- Succeeded by: Nina Y. Wang

Personal details
- Born: Christine Marie Arguello; July 15, 1955 (age 71) Thatcher, Colorado, U.S.
- Education: University of Colorado, Boulder (BS); Harvard University (JD)

Christine Marie Arguello (born July 15, 1955) is an American lawyer and jurist serving as a senior United States district judge of the United States District Court for the District of Colorado and is a former Colorado state official. Previously, she was a nominee to the United States Court of Appeals for the Tenth Circuit. She was inducted into the Colorado Women's Hall of Fame in 2014.

== Early life and education ==
Born in Thatcher, Colorado, and raised in Buena Vista, Colorado, Arguello grew up the daughter of a railroad worker who housed his family for a time in a boxcar. Arguello earned a Bachelor of Science degree from the University of Colorado at Boulder in 1977, becoming the first member of her family to graduate college, and then she earned a Juris Doctor from Harvard Law School in 1980. She was the first Latina from Colorado to be admitted to the law school.

== Career ==
Arguello began her law career as an associate in private practice. She worked for Valdes-Fauli, Cobb & Petry in Miami, Florida, from 1980 until 1985, when she joined Holland & Hart as a senior associate. Arguello was promoted to a partner at Holland & Hart in 1988.

In 1991, Arguello joined the University of Kansas School of Law as an associate professor. She was promoted to full professor in 1998.

In 1999, Arguello took a job at the University of Colorado, but changed her mind before ever teaching a class, choosing instead to join the Colorado Attorney General's office as a deputy attorney general, working alongside then-Attorney General Ken Salazar from 1999 until 2002.

After leaving the Colorado Attorney General's office, Arguello joined Davis, Graham & Stubbs in Denver in 2003, and also served as a visiting professor at the University of Denver's Sturm College of Law. In April 2006, she took a leave of absence from Davis Graham to join the University of Colorado as its managing senior associate university counsel. She held that job until she became a federal judge.

=== Federal judicial service ===
==== Tenth Circuit nomination ====
On July 27, 2000, President Bill Clinton nominated Arguello to the seat on the Tenth Circuit after John Carbone Porfilio assumed senior status.

Arguello previously had been considered by Clinton for a nomination to a district court seat. Clinton had previously nominated James Lyons to the seat in September 1999, but withdrew Lyons' nomination in June 2000. As Arguello had been nominated after July 1, 2000, the unofficial start date of the Thurmond Rule during a presidential election year, no hearings were scheduled on her nomination, and the nomination was returned to Clinton at the end of his term.

Later, President George W. Bush nominated Timothy Tymkovich to the Tenth Circuit seat to which Arguello had been originally nominated. Tymkovich won Senate confirmation two years later.

==== District court service ====
On April 3, 2008, Democratic Senator Ken Salazar included Arguello's name in a list of three names that Salazar was recommending that the president nominate. Arguello's name was included as one of three that the two senators eventually jointly forwarded to the White House. On May 17, 2008, a television station in Denver reported that the White House had accepted Arguello as a Colorado district court nominee.

On July 10, 2008, Arguello was officially nominated by President George W. Bush to a vacancy on the United States District Court for the District of Colorado created by the retirement of Judge Walker David Miller.

On September 9, 2008, she received a hearing before the Senate Judiciary Committee. She was voted out of committee two weeks later on September 25. The Senate confirmed Arguello to her district court seat in a voice vote on September 26, 2008. She received her commission on October 21, 2008, and her formal investiture ceremony took place on December 5, 2008. She assumed senior status on July 15, 2022.

=== 2009 U.S. Supreme Court vacancy ===
On May 18, 2009, Arguello confirmed to a Denver television station that she had been approached by White House intermediaries one week earlier about being considered to fill a seat on the Supreme Court of the United States. "I said 'yes,'" she told the station. "I wouldn't have gone this far if I didn't think I could serve my country in this way."

== Notable decisions ==
On June 30, 2021, in Sanderson v. United States Center for SafeSport, Inc., she considered a motion by Keith Sanderson asserting that the United States Center for SafeSport and others should be enjoined from suspending him from eligibility to compete in the Tokyo Olympics in sport shooting on August 1–2, 2021, on the basis of a sexual misconduct complaint made against him to SafeSport. She denied Sanderson's motion, writing that he and his attorney needed to serve all the defendants first before she would hand down a ruling.

Judge Arguello presided over the case of Gambian national and former 'Junglers' member Michael Sang Correa who stood trial over his participation in and commission of torture in the Gambia in 2006 following a coup attempt against then-president and dictator Yahya Jammeh. He had been indicted on 7 counts of conspiracy to comit and abetment of torture against 6 victims who at the time had been suspected by the regime to have plotted the coup. On April 15, 2025, a jury found Mr. Correa guilty on all counts. On August 22, 2025, he was sentenced by judge Arguello to 810 months (67.5 years) in prison. This case marked the very first time a non-US citizen had been successfully prosecuted under the Torture Act of 1994 in the US.

== See also ==
- Barack Obama Supreme Court candidates
- Bill Clinton judicial appointment controversies
- George W. Bush judicial appointment controversies
- List of Hispanic and Latino American jurists

Legal offices
| Preceded by Walker David Miller | Judge of the United States District Court for the District of Colorado; 2008–2022 | Succeeded by Nina Y. Wang |
