= James Corrigan =

James Corrigan may refer to:

- James Corrigan (businessman) (1848–1908), Canadian-American shipping, mining, and steel executive
- James Randall Corrigan (1865–1935), New Zealand politician
- James Corrigan (actor) (1867–1929), American actor
- James Corrigan (runner) (born 2002), American runner

== See also ==
- Jim Corrigan (disambiguation)
- James Carrigan (disambiguation)
