= Walker David Miller =

American judge (1939–2013)

Senior Judge of the United States District Court for the District of Colorado
- In office April 1, 2008 – March 24, 2013

Judge of the United States District Court for the District of Colorado
- In office July 25, 1996 – April 1, 2008
- Appointed by: Bill Clinton
- Preceded by: James R. Carrigan
- Succeeded by: Christine Arguello

Personal details
- Born: Walker David Miller; March 31, 1939 Denver, Colorado, U.S.
- Died: March 24, 2013 (aged 73) Greeley, Colorado, U.S.
- Education: University of Colorado Law School (LLB); University of Chicago Law School (LLM)

Walker David Miller (March 31, 1939 – March 24, 2013) was a United States district judge of the United States District Court for the District of Colorado.

== Education and career ==
Born in Denver, Miller received a Bachelor of Laws from the University of Colorado Law School in 1963 and a Master of Laws from the University of Chicago Law School in 1965. He was in private practice in Greeley, Colorado from 1965 to 1966. He was then an assistant professor of law at the University of Kansas School of Law from 1966 to 1969, thereafter resuming his private practice in Greeley until 1996.

== Federal judicial service ==
On April 18, 1996, Miller was nominated by President Bill Clinton to a seat on the United States District Court for the District of Colorado vacated by James R. Carrigan. Miller was confirmed by the United States Senate on July 11, 1996, and received his commission on July 25, 1996. He assumed senior status on April 1, 2008, and inactive senior status on August 1, 2011.

== Death ==
Miller died suddenly at his home in Greeley on March 24, 2013, at age 73.

== Sources ==
Legal offices
Preceded by James R. Carrigan	Judge of the United States District Court for the District of Colorado; 1996–2008	Succeeded by Christine Arguello
