= Pryor, Colorado =

Unincorporated community in Huerfano County, CO, USA

Coordinates: 37°30′29″N 104°42′51″W

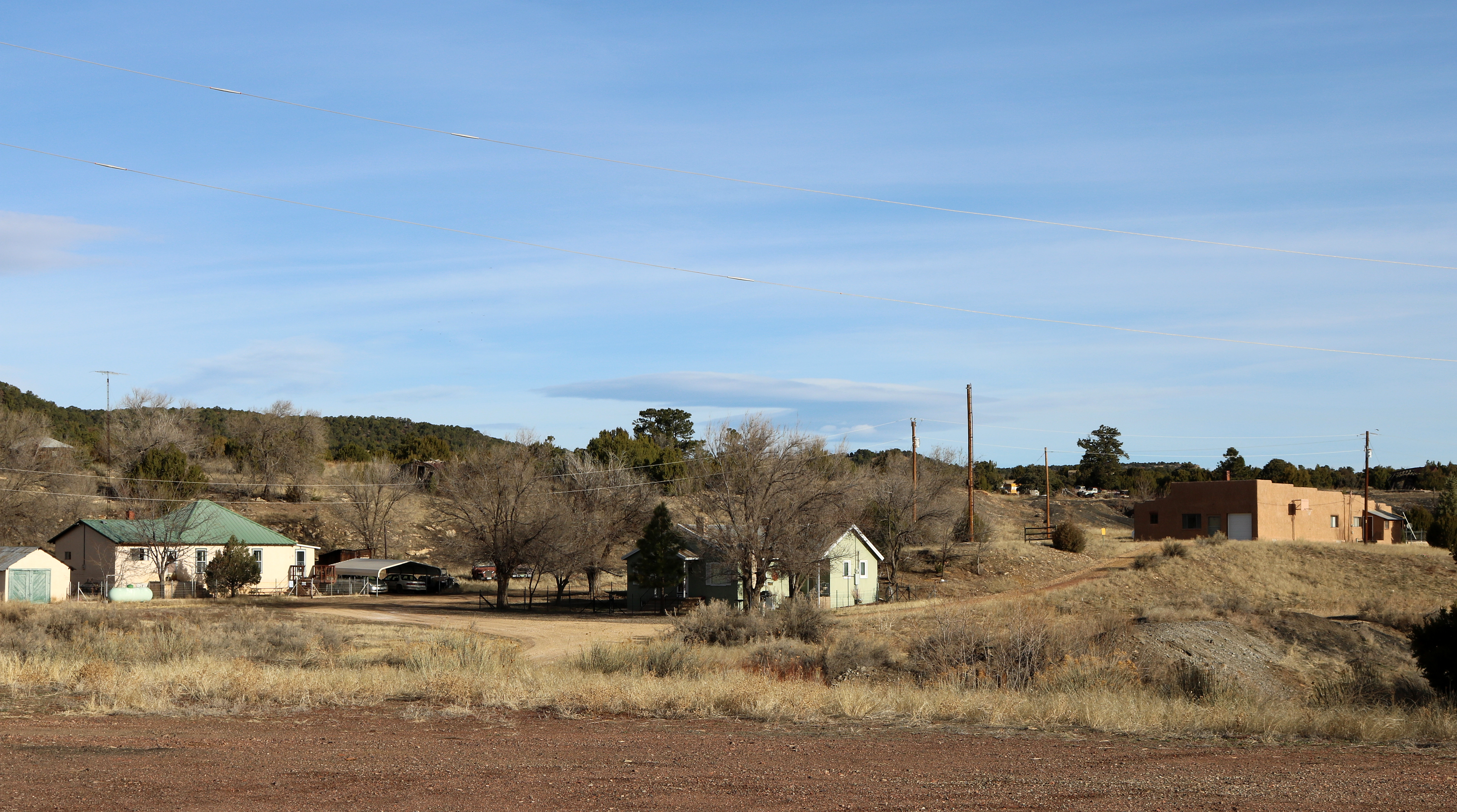
Pryor in 2018.

Pryor is an unincorporated community in Huerfano County, Colorado, United States.

== History ==
A post office called Pryor was established in 1898, and remained in operation until 1996. The community was named after Ike and Mack Pryor, local ranchers. There is no census information for Pryor as it has not been counted.
