= Shirley, El Paso County, Colorado =

Shirley
- Location within Colorado
- Coordinates: 38°54′4″N 104°39′12″W
- Country: United States
- State: Colorado
- County: El Paso County, Colorado

Shirley was a populated place and railroad spur on the Chicago, Rock Island and Pacific Railroad line in El Paso County, Colorado at 6,677 feet (2,035 m) in altitude.
