= Regnier, Oklahoma =

- Unincorporated community
- Location within the state of Oklahoma Regnier (the United States)
- Coordinates: 36°59′38″N 102°51′26″W
- Country: United States
- State: Oklahoma
- County: Cimarron
- Elevation: 4,308 ft (1,313 m)
- Time zone: UTC-6 (Central (CST))
  - Summer (DST): UTC-5 (CDT)
- GNIS feature ID: 1100783

The small settlement of Regnier in Cimarron County, Oklahoma is a Populated (Community) Place located less than 2,100 feet south of the Colorado border but 1.4 miles by highway, since the driving route requires traveling east on E0010 Road before finally turning north on N0100 Rd. The town is at an elevation of about 4,300 feet [1,311 m] above sea level.

Regnier has the distinction of being the driest spot in Oklahoma ranked by lowest annual average precipitation, logging in at just 15.62 inches.

Picture Canyon, in the Comanche National Grassland in Colorado, is to the east-northeast. The canyon includes scenic vistas, unique rock formations, rolling hills, and rock art from Plains Indian cultures.

== Notes ==
Cimarron
