= Washington Virginia Vale, Denver =

Coordinates: 39°42′14″N 104°54′46″W

Washington Virginia Vale is a neighborhood in southeastern Denver, Colorado. The neighborhood is roughly bound by Alameda Avenue, South Cherry Creek Drive, and South Quebec Street. The western border of the neighborhood merges into the city of Glendale, Colorado, an enclave of Denver.

Washington Virginia Vale is home to George Washington High School, McMeen Elementary School, Place Bridge Academy, Garland Park, and two other small city parks. The Consulates General of México, Peru, and Guatemala are all located in the neighborhood. At the heart of the Washington Virginia Vale neighborhood sits Four Mile Historic Park and the Four Mile House, a Denver landmark that "served as a stage stop, wayside inn and tavern to travelers on the Cherokee Trail."

== See also ==
- List of neighborhoods in Denver
- City and County of Denver
- State of Colorado
  - Colorado metropolitan areas
- Outline of Colorado
  - Index of Colorado-related articles
