= Thatcher, Colorado =

Unincorporated community in Las Animas County, CO, USA

- Unincorporated community
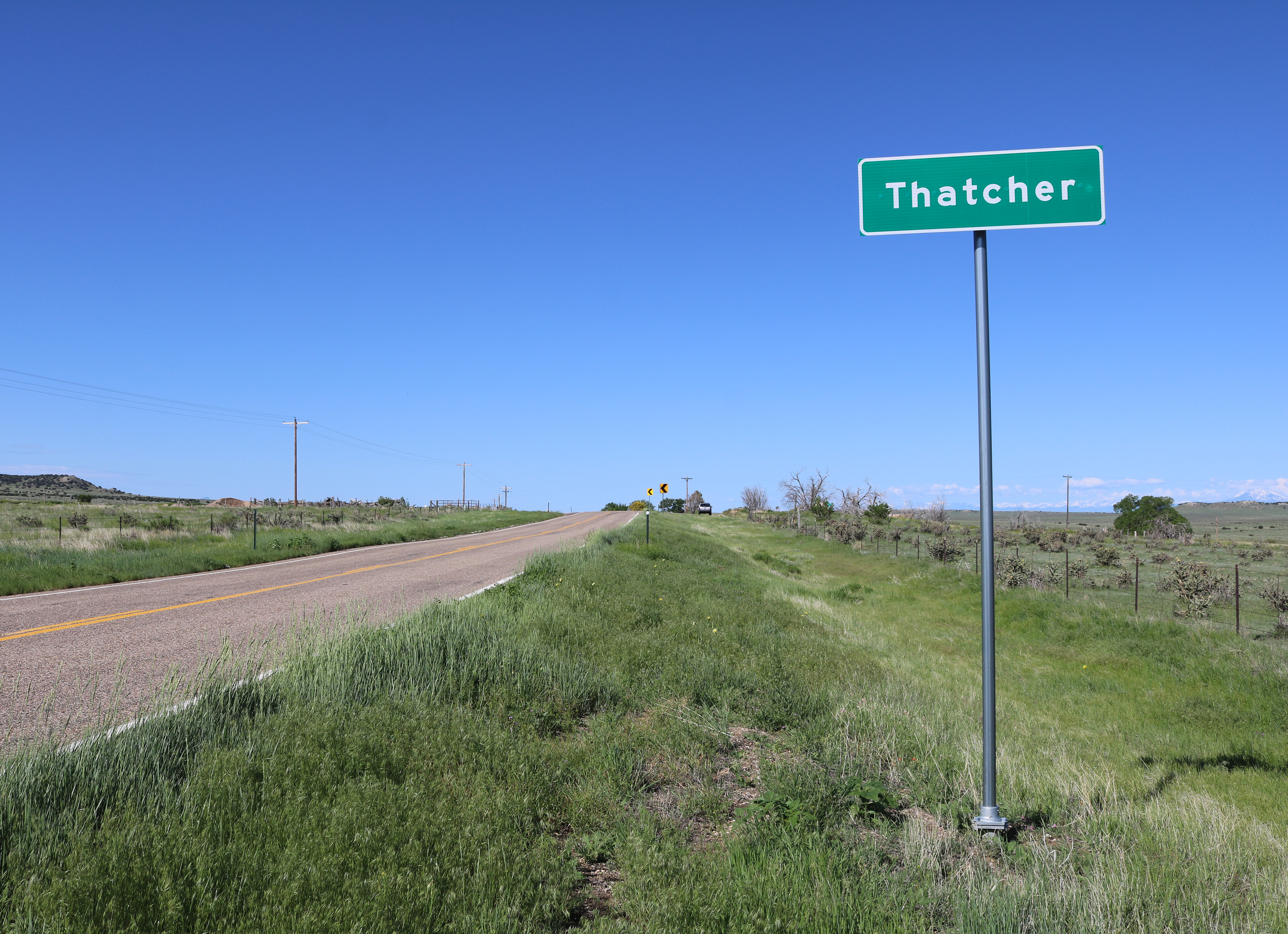
- Entering Thatcher from the northeast

- Location in Colorado Location in the United States
- Coordinates: 37°32′45″N 104°06′30″W
- Country: United States
- State: Colorado
- County: Las Animas County
- Time zone: UTC-7 (MST)
  - Summer (DST): UTC-6 (MDT)
- ZIP code: 81059 (Model)
- Area code: 719

Thatcher is an unincorporated community located in Las Animas County, Colorado, United States. The U.S. Post Office at Model (ZIP Code 81059) now serves Thatcher postal addresses.

A post office called Thatcher was established in 1883, and remained in operation until 1973. The community was named after M. D. Thatcher, a local cattleman, after being originally called "Hole-In-The-Rock" after a natural spring discovered in the area.

== Geography ==
Thatcher is located at 37°32′45″N 104°06′30″W (37.545830,-104.108330).

== Notable residents ==
- Christine Arguello (born 1955), federal judge
