= Puritan, Colorado =

Unincorporated community in Weld County, CO, USA

Puritan
- unincorporated community
- Location within Colorado Location within the United States
- Coordinates: 40°05′06″N 104°59′57″W
- Country: United States
- State: Colorado
- County: Weld
- Elevation: 5,023 ft (1,531 m)
- Time zone: UTC-7 (Mountain (MST))
  - Summer (DST): UTC-6 (MDT)
- GNIS feature ID: 180843

Puritan is a former unincorporated community in Weld County, Colorado United States.

The community took its name from the nearby Puritan Coal Mine, so named for the high quality of its coal.

== History ==
In 1908, the Union Pacific Railroad laid a spur line to service the Puritan Coal Mine located there. A "company town" operated by the National Fuel Company was erected around the mine, and all the houses and stores were owned by the company and rented to miners and their families. Puritan had a store, boarding house, pool hall, and 100 houses.

The settlement was populated from 1908 to 1939, after which the mine was closed and dismantled, and the machinery moved 3 mi (4.8 km) south. Most of the houses were sold and moved.
