= Saint Vrains, Colorado =

Ghost town in Weld County, Colorado

Coordinates: 40°02′13″N 104°57′17″W

Saint Vrains is a ghost town in Weld County, Colorado, United States.

== History ==
Saint Vrains was founded on the Union Pacific Railroad sometime after 1910 when the rail line from Dacono to Denver was finished. The Saint Vrains post office operated from September 30, 1915 until March 15, 1918. Another rail line that existed in the same area was constructed from Boulder to Brighton in the early 1870s by the Denver & Boulder Valley Railroad. The two lines formed a junction near Saint Vrains.

Coal mining had a significant presence in the area of Saint Vrains. The Lincoln Mine, just north of the rail junction, began operation in 1948. Multiple other coal mines existed in the area, with some lasting well into the 1960s or 1970s. The closure of the Lincoln Mine in 1979 marked the end of coal mining in the region, and likely led to a reduction of rail traffic in the area.

Saint Vrains served as a railway station in the Union Pacific system. It was located on lines between Boulder, Briggsdale, Denver, Fort Collins, Greeley, and LaSalle. Due to the creation of Amtrak in 1971, passenger rail service in the area was withdrawn, and the station was closed.

In 1966, the portion of the rail line to Brighton that lay east of Saint Vrains was abandoned after the bridge crossing the South Platte River was washed out in a flood. Later, in 1994, the portion of the rail line to Dacono north of Saint Vrains was also abandoned, leaving only the two connections to Boulder and Denver. The decline of coal mining, and the abandonment of nearby rail lines, made the junction less important to the Union Pacific Railroad by 1994. Therefore, Saint Vrains was likely abandoned sometime between 1971 and 1994.

In 2001, the rail bridge over I-25 was demolished, thereby severing the rail connection to Boulder. The Colorado Department of Transportation was willing to let Union Pacific rebuild the bridge, but the bridge was never rebuilt.

In 2009, the rail line to Denver was sold to the Regional Transportation District, thereby ending the presence of the Union Pacific Railroad in the Saint Vrains area.

== Name ==
Saint Vrains was named for Ceran St. Vrain, a pioneer trader from St. Louis, Missouri.
