= Jim Carrigan (judge) =

American judge

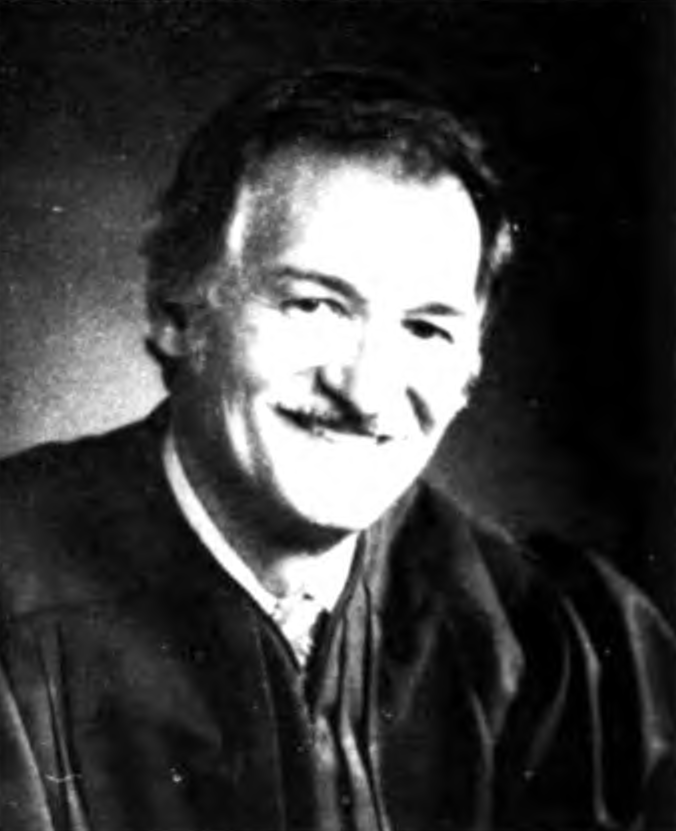

Senior Judge of the United States District Court for the District of Colorado
- In office October 10, 1994 – August 19, 1995

Judge of the United States District Court for the District of Colorado
- In office September 26, 1979 – October 10, 1994
- Appointed by: Jimmy Carter
- Preceded by: Seat established by 92 Stat. 1629
- Succeeded by: Walker David Miller

Personal details
- Born: James R. Carrigan; August 24, 1929 Mobridge, South Dakota
- Died: August 15, 2014 (aged 84) Boulder, Colorado
- Education: University of North Dakota; New York University

James R. Carrigan (August 24, 1929 – August 15, 2014) was a United States district judge of the United States District Court for the District of Colorado and previously was a justice of the Colorado Supreme Court.

== Education and career ==
Born in Mobridge, South Dakota, Carrigan received a Bachelor of Philosophy from the University of North Dakota in 1953, a Juris Doctor from the University of North Dakota School of Law in 1953, and a Master of Laws from New York University School of Law in 1956. He was in private practice in Williston, North Dakota from 1953 to 1954. He was an assistant professor of law at the University of Denver from 1956 to 1959. He was a visiting associate professor at the New York University School of Law in 1958, and at the Washington University School of Law of Washington University in St. Louis from 1959 to 1960. He was a judicial administrator of the State of Colorado from 1960 to 1961 and was in private practice in Denver from 1961 to 1962. He was again a professor of law at the University of Colorado from 1961 to 1967, returning to private practice in Denver and Boulder, Colorado from 1967 to 1976. He was a justice of the Colorado Supreme Court from 1976 to 1979.

== Federal judicial service ==
On June 1, 1979, Carrigan was nominated by President Jimmy Carter to a new seat on the United States District Court for the District of Colorado created by 92 Stat. 1629. He was confirmed by the United States Senate on September 25, 1979, and received his commission on September 26, 1979. He assumed senior status on October 10, 1994, and served in that capacity until his retirement on August 19, 1995.

== Post judicial service ==
Following his retirement from the bench, Carrigan served as an arbitrator for the Judicial Arbiter Group in Denver.

== Death ==
Carrigan died on August 15, 2014, in Boulder, after suffering a series of strokes.

== Sources ==
Legal offices
Preceded by Seat established by 92 Stat. 1629	Judge of the United States District Court for the District of Colorado; 1979–1994	Succeeded by Walker David Miller
Preceded by Edward C. Day Jr.	Justice of the Colorado Supreme Court; 1976–1979	Succeeded by George E. Lohr
