= List of populated places in Colorado: A–F =

The location of the State of Colorado in the United States of America.

The 64 counties of the U.S. State of Colorado

See also the List of populated places in Colorado by county.

This is a list of more than 3,800 currently, or formerly, inhabited places in the U.S. State of Colorado. (Note: This list includes 1913 Colorado places selectively downloaded from the Geographic Names Information System on October 15, 2023.)
Currently inhabited places in Colorado include the:

- 273 municipalities from the List of municipalities in Colorado
- 210 census-designated places from the List of census-designated places in Colorado
- 64 counties from the List of counties in Colorado.
- 8 military bases from the List of military installations in Colorado
- 2 Native American reservations from the List of Native American reservations in Colorado

This list also includes the current and extinct populated places found in the:

- Geographic Names Information System
- United States Geological Survey historic trail maps
- List of county seats in Colorado
- List of forts in Colorado
- List of ghost towns in Colorado
- List of National Register of Historic Places in Colorado
- List of post offices in Colorado
- List of trading posts in Colorado

- For important dates associated with many of these places, please see the List of municipalities in Colorado and the List of post offices in Colorado.
- For the ZIP Codes for many of these places, please see the List of post offices in Colorado.
- For the telephone area codes for many of these places, please see the List of Colorado telephone area codes.
- For all federally recognized place names in Colorado, please see the Geographic Names Information System.

	County
†	County seat
‡	Former county seat
#	State capital
⁂	Former territorial capital

Colorado populated places: A B C D E F G H I J K L M N O P Q R S T U V W X Y Z

== A ==
Select the OpenStreetMap link at the right to view the location of places in this section.

Place	County	Type	Location	Elevation
Abarr	Yuma	unincorporated community	39.8505°N 102.7072°W	4,242 feet (1,293 m)
Abbey	Pueblo	former post office		
Abbeyville	Gunnison	ghost town	38.7775°N 106.4922°W	9,931 feet (3,027 m)
Abbott	Washington	former post office		
Aberdeen	Gunnison	ghost town	38.4506°N 106.9908°W	
Abeyta	Las Animas	ghost town	37.0797°N 104.1864°W	5,725 feet (1,745 m)
Abeyton	Las Animas	see Gulnare		
Able	Bent	ghost town	38.0606°N 102.8696°W	3,783 feet (1,153 m)
Acequia	Douglas	unincorporated community	39.5236°N 105.0280°W	5,554 feet (1,693 m)
Ackmen	Montezuma	former post office		
Acres Green	Douglas	census-designated place	39.5567°N 104.8961°W	5,833 feet (1,778 m)
Adams	Larimer	former post office		
Adams City	Adams	Commerce City neighborhood	39.8267°N 104.9289°W	5,135 feet (1,565 m)
Adams County		county	39.8742°N 104.3378°W	
Adelaide	Fremont	ghost town	38.5600°N 105.0908°W	6,949 feet (2,118 m)
Adelaide	Lake	ghost town	39.2472°N 106.2581°W	10,833 feet (3,302 m)
Adena	Morgan	ghost town	40.0083°N 103.8866°W	4,692 feet (1,430 m)
Adrian	Summit	former post office		
Aetna Estates	Arapahoe	census-designated place	39.7381°N 104.6732°W	5,614 feet (1,711 m)
Agate	Elbert	unincorporated community	39.4617°N 103.9422°W	5,446 feet (1,660 m)
Agate	Pueblo	former post office		
Aguilar	Las Animas	statutory town	37.4028°N 104.6533°W	6,388 feet (1,947 m)
Air Force Academy CDP	El Paso	census-designated place	38.9985°N 104.8541°W	6,841 feet (2,085 m)
Akin	Mesa	ghost town	39.2547°N 108.2631°W	4,849 feet (1,478 m)
Akron† (Note: Akron has been the seat of Washington County, Colorado since the county was created on February 9, 1887.)	Washington	statutory town	40.1605°N 103.2144°W	4,659 feet (1,420 m)
Alamo	Huerfano	unincorporated community	37.6556°N 104.9586°W	6,831 feet (2,082 m)
Alamo Placita	Denver	Denver neighborhood	39.7208°N 104.9758°W	5,269 feet (1,606 m)
Alamosa† (Note: Alamosa has been the seat of Alamosa County, Colorado since the county was created on March 8, 1913.)	Alamosa	home rule city	37.4694°N 105.8700°W	7,543 feet (2,299 m)
Alamosa County		county	37.5728°N 105.7884°W	
Alamosa East	Alamosa	census-designated place	37.4767°N 105.8397°W	7,539 feet (2,298 m)
Albano	El Paso	former post office		
Albany	Prowers	former post office		
Alcott	Denver	Denver post office	39.7678°N 105.0436°W	
Alcreek	Las Animas	former post office		
Alda	Delta	former post office		
Alder	Saguache	ghost town	38.3694°N 106.0395°W	8,543 feet (2,604 m)
Alder Creek	San Miguel	former post office		
Alexander	Lake	former post office		
Alexander	Otero	see Fowler		
Alfalfa	Larimer	former post office		
Alfalfa	Las Animas	former post office		
Alford	Larimer	former post office		
Algonquin Acres	Arapahoe	unincorporated community	39.5983°N 104.8264°W	5,663 feet (1,726 m)
Alicante	Lake	former post office		
Alice	Clear Creek	ghost town	39.8183°N 105.6428°W	10,092 feet (3,076 m)
Alkalai	Bent	former post office		
Alkali	Dolores	former post office		
Alkire Estates	Jefferson	Arvada neighborhood	39.8431°N 105.1450°W	5,597 feet (1,706 m)
Allen	Gunnison	former post office		
Allenspark	Boulder	census-designated place	40.1944°N 105.5256°W	8,491 feet (2,588 m)
Allison	La Plata	unincorporated community	37.0244°N 107.4881°W	6,217 feet (1,895 m)
Alma	Park	statutory town	39.2839°N 106.0628°W	10,361 feet (3,158 m)
Alma Junction	Park	ghost town	39.2675°N 106.0453°W	10,256 feet (3,126 m)
Almont	Gunnison	unincorporated community	38.6647°N 106.8462°W	8,022 feet (2,445 m)
Alnwick	Teller	former post office		
Alpine	Chaffee	ghost town	38.7111°N 106.2770°W	9,268 feet (2,825 m)
Alpine	Rio Grande	census-designated place	37.6892°N 106.5889°W	8,288 feet (2,526 m)
Alta	San Miguel	ghost town	37.8864°N 107.8528°W	11,060 feet (3,371 m)
Alta Vista	Jefferson	Arvada neighborhood	39.8072°N 105.0936°W	5,354 feet (1,632 m)
Altman	Teller	ghost town	38.7361°N 105.1339°W	10,630 feet (3,240 m)
Altona	Boulder	census-designated place	40.1254°N 105.2924°W	5,932 feet (1,808 m)
Altura	Arapahoe	unincorporated community	39.7403°N 104.8044°W	5,430 feet (1,655 m)
Altura	Adams	unincorporated community	39.7403°N 104.8044°W	5,430 feet (1,655 m)
Altura	Archuleta	unincorporated community	37.1833°N 107.1912°W	7,159 feet (2,182 m)
Alva	Yuma	see Idalia		
Alvin	Yuma	unincorporated community	40.3078°N 102.0757°W	3,599 feet (1,097 m)
Amache National Historic Site	Prowers	former internment camp	38.0496°N 102.3286°W	3,602 feet (1,098 m)
American City	Gilpin	ghost town	39.8725°N 105.5872°W	10,633 feet (3,241 m)
American Ranch	Logan	former post office		
Ames	San Miguel	ghost town	37.8647°N 107.8823°W	8,720 feet (2,658 m)
Amethyst	Mineral	see Creede (Note: On November 7, 1893, county voters selected Amethyst as the new seat of Mineral County, Colorado. On February 2, 1909, Amethyst changed its name to Creede. Creede has continued to serve as the county seat.)		
Amherst	Phillips	census-designated place	40.6832°N 102.1726°W	3,691 feet (1,125 m)
Amity	Prowers	former post office		
Amo	El Paso	former post office		
Amy	Lincoln	former post office		
Anaconda	Teller	ghost town	38.7319°N 105.1631°W	9,498 feet (2,895 m)
Andersonville	Larimer	unincorporated community	40.5939°N 105.0572°W	4,948 feet (1,508 m)
Andersonville	Pueblo	former post office		
Andrix	Las Animas	unincorporated community	37.2795°N 103.1927°W	5,394 feet (1,644 m)
Angora	Otero	former post office		
Angora	Rio Blanco	unincorporated community	40.1766°N 108.5757°W	5,466 feet (1,666 m)
Animas	La Plata	see Animas City		
Animas City	La Plata	ghost town	37.3017°N 107.8688°W	
Animas Forks	San Juan	ghost town	37.9311°N 107.5714°W	11,184 feet (3,409 m)
Anita	Fremont	former post office		
Antares	El Paso	Colorado Springs neighborhood	38.8486°N 104.7789°W	
Antelope Springs	Mineral	former post office		
Antelope Springs	Morgan	former post office		
Antero	Chaffee	former post office		
Antero Junction	Park	ghost town	38.9233°N 105.9653°W	9,186 feet (2,800 m)
Anthracite	Gunnison	former post office		
Anthracite	Routt	former post office		
Antlers	Garfield	unincorporated community	39.5433°N 107.7278°W	5,387 feet (1,642 m)
Anton	Washington	unincorporated community	39.7417°N 103.2172°W	4,869 feet (1,484 m)
Antonito	Conejos	statutory town	37.0792°N 106.0086°W	7,887 feet (2,404 m)
Anvil Points	Garfield	ghost town	39.5161°N 107.9228°W	5,653 feet (1,723 m)
Apache	Huerfano	former post office		
Apache City	Huerfano	ghost town	37.8583°N 104.8311°W	5,945 feet (1,812 m)
Apache Mesa	Arapahoe	Aurora neighborhood	39.7319°N 104.7958°W	5,463 feet (1,665 m)
Apex	Gilpin	ghost town	39.8656°N 105.5702°W	9,846 feet (3,001 m)
Apishapa	Las Animas	see Augusta		
Apple Meadows	Jefferson	Arvada neighborhood	39.8047°N 105.2119°W	5,801 feet (1,768 m)
Appleton	Mesa	unincorporated community	39.1208°N 108.6082°W	4,593 feet (1,400 m)
Applewood	Jefferson	census-designated place	39.7578°N 105.1625°W	5,581 feet (1,701 m)
Applewood Glen	Jefferson	Lakewood neighborhood	39.7453°N 105.1344°W	5,568 feet (1,697 m)
Applewood Grove	Jefferson	unincorporated community	39.7436°N 105.1458°W	5,610 feet (1,710 m)
Applewood Village	Jefferson	Wheat Ridge neighborhood	39.7656°N 105.1331°W	5,472 feet (1,668 m)
Ara	Boulder	Boulder neighborhood	40.0250°N 105.2503°W	5,266 feet (1,605 m)
Arapahoe	Cheyenne	census-designated place	38.8500°N 102.1821°W	4,006 feet (1,221 m)
Arapahoe‡ (Note: On November 28, 1859, the Provisional Government of the Territory of Jefferson created 12 counties, with Arapahoe City as the first seat of Jefferson County, Jefferson Territory. On January 17, 1860, Arapahoe City shortened its name to Arapahoe. On November 6, 1860, the Jefferson Territory moved the seat of Jefferson County to Golden City.)	Jefferson	see Arapahoe City		
Arapahoe City‡	Jefferson	ghost town	39.7750°N 105.1784°W	5,576 feet (1,700 m)
Arapahoe County		county	39.6503°N 104.3393°W	
Arastra (Note: In operation from June 15, 1895, until March 31, 1919, the Arastra, Colorado, post office was the highest elevation U.S. post office ever at an elevation of 12,230 feet (3,728 m).)	San Juan	ghost town	37.7928°N 107.6070°W	12,230 feet (3,728 m)
Arboles	Archuleta	census-designated place	37.0281°N 107.4192°W	6,280 feet (1,914 m)
Arbourville	Chaffee	see Conrow		
Archer	Jefferson	ghost town	39.5333°N 105.0769°W	5,433 feet (1,656 m)
Archers	Jefferson	former post office		
Archuleta County		county	37.1937°N 107.0481°W	
Arden	Kiowa	former post office		
Arena	Cheyenne	former post office		
Arequa	Teller	former post office		
Argenta (Note: The name of Argenta was changed to Tomichi on August 23, 1880.)	Gunnison	see Tomichi		
Argentine (1881)	Summit	former post office	39.4478°N 106.0171°W	10,604 feet (3,232 m)
Argentine (1901) (Note: The Decatur, Colorado, post office closed on January 28, 1885, but reopened as Rathbone on September 19, 1891. The Rathbone post office closed on July 1, 1895, but reopened as the second Argentine post office on November 18, 1901.)	Summit	see Decatur, Summit County		
Argo (Note: On December 1, 1902, the newly created City and County of Denver annexed the towns of Argo, Berkeley, Elyria, Globeville, Montclair, and Valverde.)	Denver	former statutory town	39.7800°N 104.9924°W	
Argo Mill	Clear Creek	Idaho Springs neighborhood	39.7428°N 105.5067°W	7,503 feet (2,287 m)
Arickaree	Washington	unincorporated community	39.6992°N 103.0660°W	4,715 feet (1,437 m)
Aristocrat Ranchettes	Weld	census-designated place	40.1091°N 104.7625°W	5,003 feet (1,525 m)
Arkansas (Note: On March 28, 1881, Arkansas changed its name to Salida. Salida has served as the seat of Chaffee County, Colorado since 1928.)	Chaffee	see Salida		
Arkansas Junction	Lake	former post office		
Arkins	Larimer	former post office		
Arland	Pueblo	former post office		
Arlene	Pueblo	former post office		
Arlington	Kiowa	unincorporated community	38.3361°N 103.3433°W	4,222 feet (1,287 m)
Arlington	Mesa	former post office		
Arloa	Montezuma	former post office		
Armel	Yuma	unincorporated community	39.7972°N 102.1082°W	3,809 feet (1,161 m)
Armour	Pueblo	former post office		
Armstrong	Logan	former post office		
Arnold	Logan	see Willard		
Arnold	Yuma	former post office		
Aroya	Cheyenne	unincorporated community	38.8542°N 103.1255°W	4,580 feet (1,396 m)
Arrastra	San Juan	see Arastra		
Arriba	Lincoln	statutory town	39.2861°N 103.2755°W	5,240 feet (1,597 m)
Arriola	Montezuma	unincorporated community	37.4425°N 108.6462°W	6,404 feet (1,952 m)
Arrow	Grand	ghost town		
Arrowhead	Larimer	unincorporated community	40.5791°N 105.0244°W	4,925 feet (1,501 m)
Arrowhead Village	Eagle	unincorporated community	39.6344°N 106.5670°W	7,359 feet (2,243 m)
Arrowood	Boulder	unincorporated community	40.1872°N 105.5108°W	8,255 feet (2,516 m)
Arroya	Lincoln	former post office		
Artesia	Moffat	see Dinosaur		
Artman	Pueblo	former post office		
Arvada	Jefferson	home rule city	39.8028°N 105.0875°W	5,348 feet (1,630 m)
Arvada	Adams	home rule city	39.8028°N 105.0875°W	5,348 feet (1,630 m)
Ash	Ouray	former post office		
Ashcroft	Pitkin	ghost town	39.0536°N 106.7998°W	9,521 feet (2,902 m)
Ashland	Kit Carson	former post office		
Aspen† (Note: Aspen has been the seat of Pitkin County, Colorado since the county was created on February 23, 1881.)	Pitkin	home rule city	39.1911°N 106.8175°W	7,890 feet (2,405 m)
Aspen Creek	Broomfield	Broomfield neighborhood	39.9453°N 105.0547°W	5,364 feet (1,635 m)
Aspen Junction	Eagle	see Basalt		
Aspen Meadows	Boulder	unincorporated community	39.9764°N 105.4133°W	8,110 feet (2,472 m)
Aspen Park	Jefferson	census-designated place	39.5392°N 105.2947°W	8,143 feet (2,482 m)
Aspen-Gerbaz	Pitkin	former post office		
Astor City	Eagle	ghost town	39.5500°N 106.4089°W	8,166 feet (2,489 m)
Atchee	Garfield	ghost town	39.5630°N 108.9129°W	6,417 feet (1,956 m)
Athens	Denver	former post office		
Athmar Park	Denver	Denver neighborhood	39.7040°N 105.0110°W	
Atlanta	Baca	unincorporated community	37.5036°N 102.9960°W	4,718 feet (1,438 m)
Atwell	Las Animas	former post office		
Atwood	Logan	census-designated place	40.5478°N 103.2697°W	3,993 feet (1,217 m)
Auburn	Weld	unincorporated community	40.3680°N 104.6366°W	4,652 feet (1,418 m)
Augusta	Custer	former post office		
Augusta	Las Animas	former post office		
Ault	Weld	statutory town	40.5825°N 104.7319°W	4,938 feet (1,505 m)
Auraria (Note: On December 3, 1859, the Provisional Government of the Territory of Jefferson consolidated the towns of Denver City, Auraria, and Highland into the City of Denver, Auraria, and Highland. Auraria and Highland are now neighborhoods of the City and County of Denver.)	Denver	Denver neighborhood	39.7428°N 105.0052°W	
Aurora	Arapahoe	home rule city	39.7294°N 104.8319°W	5,404 feet (1,647 m)
Aurora	Adams	home rule city	39.7294°N 104.8319°W	5,404 feet (1,647 m)
Aurora	Douglas	home rule city	39.7294°N 104.8319°W	5,404 feet (1,647 m)
Aurora	Ouray	former post office		
Aurora	San Miguel	see Dallas Divide		
Aurora Heights	Arapahoe	Aurora neighborhood	39.7364°N 104.8575°W	5,404 feet (1,647 m)
Aurora Highlands	Arapahoe	Aurora neighborhood	39.6897°N 104.7797°W	5,577 feet (1,700 m)
Aurora Hills	Arapahoe	Aurora neighborhood	39.7069°N 104.8472°W	5,515 feet (1,681 m)
Aurora Knolls	Arapahoe	Aurora neighborhood	39.6806°N 104.7778°W	5,656 feet (1,724 m)
Auroria	Larimer	see Laporte		
Austin	Delta	Orchard City neighborhood	38.7811°N 107.9509°W	5,043 feet (1,537 m)
Austin	Garfield	former post office		
Autobees (Note: On November 1, 1861, the Territory of Colorado created 17 original counties, with Autobees Plaza as the original seat of Huerfano County, Colorado Territory, serving until 1868.)	Pueblo	see Autobees Plaza		
Autobees Plaza‡	Pueblo	ghost town	38.2100°N 104.2872°W	
Avalo	Weld	unincorporated community	40.8033°N 103.6502°W	4,521 feet (1,378 m)
Avendale	Kit Carson	former post office		
Avoca	Yuma	former post office		
Avon	Eagle	home rule town	39.6314°N 106.5223°W	7,431 feet (2,265 m)
Avondale	Pueblo	census-designated place	38.2375°N 104.3511°W	4,557 feet (1,389 m)
Axial	Moffat	ghost town	40.2853°N 107.7920°W	6,453 feet (1,967 m)
Ayer	Otero	ghost town	37.7581°N 103.8463°W	4,583 feet (1,397 m)
Aylmer	Las Animas	see Bowen		
Ayr	Prowers	former post office		

== B ==
Select the OpenStreetMap link at the right to view the location of places in this section.

Place	County	Type	Location	Elevation
Baca County		county	37.3191°N 102.5605°W	
Bachelor	Mineral	ghost town		
Bachelor City	Mineral	see Bachelor		
Bachelor Gulch Village	Eagle	unincorporated community	39.6222°N 106.5437°W	8,166 feet (2,489 m)
Badger	Washington	former post office		
Badger House Community	Montezuma	Puebloan dwellings	37.1886°N 108.5345°W	7,126 feet (2,172 m)
Badito‡ (Note: On September 12, 1865, Little Orphan changed its name to Badito. Badito served as the seat of Huerfano County, Colorado Territory from 1868 until 1874.)	Huerfano	ghost town	37.7272°N 105.0142°W	6,430 feet (1,960 m)
Bailey	Park	unincorporated community	39.4055°N 105.4733°W	7,740 feet (2,359 m)
Baker	Baca	former post office		
Baker	Denver	Denver neighborhood		
Bakerville	Clear Creek	ghost town	39.6914°N 105.8050°W	9,787 feet (2,983 m)
Balarat	Boulder	unincorporated community	40.1592°N 105.3964°W	7,454 feet (2,272 m)
Bald Mountain	Gilpin	see Nevadaville		
Baldwin	Gunnison	ghost town	38.7639°N 107.0478°W	8,766 feet (2,672 m)
Balfour	Park	unincorporated community	38.9072°N 105.7244°W	9,094 feet (2,772 m)
Balltown	Lake	unincorporated community	39.0778°N 106.2811°W	9,035 feet (2,754 m)
Baltimore	Gilpin	ghost town	39.9033°N 105.5744°W	8,904 feet (2,714 m)
Baltzer	Kit Carson	former post office		
Balzac	Garfield	former post office		
Bar-K Ranch	Boulder	see Bark Ranch		
Barbee	Routt	former post office		
Bardeen	El Paso	former post office		
Bardine	Gunnison	former post office		
Barehills	Fremont	former post office		
Barela	Las Animas	unincorporated community	37.1156°N 104.2616°W	5,761 feet (1,756 m)
Bark Ranch	Boulder	census-designated place	40.1175°N 105.4394°W	8,510 feet (2,594 m)
Barlow (Note: On June 25, 1883, Defiance changed its name to Barlow, and several months later, county voters selected Barlow as the new seat of Garfield County, Colorado. On March 28, 1884, Barlow changed its name to Glenwood Springs, and Glenwood Springs continues to serve as county seat.)	Garfield	see Glenwood Springs		
Barnes	Montrose	former post office		
Barnesville	Weld	unincorporated community	40.4791°N 104.4797°W	4,656 feet (1,419 m)
Barnum (Note: The City of Denver annexed the Town of Barnum on September 3, 1896.)	Denver	Denver neighborhood	39.7183°N 105.0325°W	
Barnum	Gunnison	former post office		
Barnum West	Denver	Denver neighborhood		
Barr	Adams	see Barr Lake		
Barr Lake	Adams	unincorporated community	39.9444°N 104.7752°W	5,115 feet (1,559 m)
Barry	Teller	former post office		
Barton	Prowers	former post office		
Basalt	Eagle	home rule town	39.3689°N 107.0328°W	6,611 feet (2,015 m)
Basalt	Pitkin	home rule town	39.3689°N 107.0328°W	6,611 feet (2,015 m)
Bashor	Adams	former post office		
Basin	San Miguel	unincorporated community	38.0658°N 108.5368°W	6,529 feet (1,990 m)
Bassetts Mill	El Paso	former post office		
Bassick	Custer	see Querida		
Bassick City	Custer	see Querida		
Bath	Park	former post office		
Battle Creek	Routt	unincorporated community	41.0014°N 107.2451°W	6,706 feet (2,044 m)
Battlement Mesa	Garfield	census-designated place	39.4414°N 108.0251°W	5,489 feet (1,673 m)
Baxter	Pueblo	unincorporated community	38.2758°N 104.4916°W	4,606 feet (1,404 m)
Baxterville	Rio Grande	unincorporated community	37.6742°N 106.6578°W	8,235 feet (2,510 m)
Bayfield	La Plata	statutory town	37.2256°N 107.5981°W	6,900 feet (2,103 m)
Bayou Hills	Douglas	unincorporated community	39.4263°N 104.7038°W	6,381 feet (1,945 m)
Beacon	Las Animas	former post office		
Beacon Hill	Teller	unincorporated community	38.7225°N 105.1650°W	9,524 feet (2,903 m)
Bear Cañon	Douglas	former post office		
Bear Canyon	Douglas	former post office		
Bear River	Routt	ghost town	40.4839°N 107.1173°W	6,424 feet (1,958 m)
Bear Valley	Denver	Denver neighborhood	39.6628°N 105.0608°W	5,387 feet (1,642 m)
Bear Valley Heights	Denver	Denver neighborhood	39.6475°N 105.0589°W	5,459 feet (1,664 m)
Bearcreek	Montezuma	former post office		
Beards Corner	San Miguel	unincorporated community	38.0658°N 108.6120°W	6,368 feet (1,941 m)
Beartown	San Juan	unincorporated community	37.7228°N 107.5039°W	11,188 feet (3,410 m)
Beaty	Dolores	former post office		
Beaver	Fremont	former post office		
Beaver Brook	Jefferson	former post office		
Beaver Creek	Arapahoe	former post office		
Beaver Creek	Fremont	see Beaver		
Beaver Creek Village	Eagle	unincorporated community	39.6049°N 106.5153°W	8,097 feet (2,468 m)
Beaver Point	Larimer	unincorporated community	40.3644°N 105.5444°W	7,654 feet (2,333 m)
Beaverton	Kit Carson	former post office		
Bedrock	Montrose	unincorporated community	38.3150°N 108.8909°W	4,990 feet (1,521 m)
Bee (Note: On September 20, 1887, Bee changed its name to Sheridan Lake; then changed it back to Bee on October 15, 1887; then changed it back again to Sheridan Lake on October 27, 1887. Sheridan Lake served as the original seat of Kiowa County, Colorado since the county was created on April 11, 1889, until 1902.)	Kiowa	see Sheridan Lake		
Beecher	Yuma	see Beecher Island		
Beecher Island	Yuma	former post office	39.8722°N 102.1844°W	3,517 feet (1,072 m)
Belcaro	Denver	Denver neighborhood		
Belden	Eagle	ghost town	39.5255°N 106.3861°W	9,646 feet (2,940 m)
Belford	Clear Creek	former post office		
Belford	Hinsdale	former post office		
Belle Monte	Boulder	former post office		
Belleview	Chaffee	unincorporated community	38.5692°N 106.0372°W	7,215 feet (2,199 m)
Bellevue	Jefferson	see Shaffers Crossing		
Bellevue Acres	Jefferson	unincorporated community	39.6217°N 105.1422°W	5,830 feet (1,777 m)
Bellvue	Larimer	unincorporated community	40.6264°N 105.1716°W	5,131 feet (1,564 m)
Belmar	Jefferson	Lakewood neighborhood		
Belmont	Pueblo	Pueblo post office		
Beloit	Kit Carson	former post office		
Benko	Elbert	former post office		
Bennet	Adams	see Bennett		
Bennet Springs	Douglas	former post office		
Bennett	Adams	statutory town	39.7589°N 104.4275°W	5,486 feet (1,672 m)
Bennett	Arapahoe	statutory town	39.7589°N 104.4275°W	5,486 feet (1,672 m)
Bent Canyon	Las Animas	former post office		
Bent County		county	37.9548°N 103.0717°W	
Benton	Otero	unincorporated community	37.9050°N 103.6572°W	4,281 feet (1,305 m)
Bent's Fort	Otero	see Bent's Old Fort		
Bent's New Fort	Bent	historic trading post		
Bent's Old Fort	Otero	historic trading post	38.0406°N 103.4294°W	4,008 feet (1,222 m)
Bent's Second Fort	Bent	see Bent's New Fort		
Bergdorf	Weld	see Ault		
Bergen Park	Jefferson	unincorporated community	39.6914°N 105.3617°W	7,792 feet (2,375 m)
Berkeley	Denver	Denver neighborhood	39.7784°N 105.0440°W	
Berkeley Gardens	Adams	unincorporated community	39.7947°N 105.0347°W	5,285 feet (1,611 m)
Berkley	Adams	census-designated place	39.8044°N 105.0261°W	5,217 feet (1,590 m)
Berkley	Denver	see Berkeley, Denver		
Bernard	Mesa	former post office		
Bernice	Costilla	former post office		
Berry	Kit Carson	former post office		
Berthoud	Larimer	statutory town	40.3083°N 105.0811°W	5,033 feet (1,534 m)
Berthoud	Weld	statutory town	40.3083°N 105.0811°W	5,033 feet (1,534 m)
Berthoud Falls	Clear Creek	unincorporated community	39.7708°N 105.8086°W	9,793 feet (2,985 m)
Berts Corner	Larimer	unincorporated community	40.3078°N 105.1028°W	5,075 feet (1,547 m)
Berwind	Las Animas	ghost town		
Beshoar	Las Animas	ghost town	37.2181°N 104.4066°W	5,922 feet (1,805 m)
Beta	Logan	unincorporated community	40.4661°N 103.3788°W	4,072 feet (1,241 m)
Beta	Prowers	unincorporated community	38.0861°N 102.6905°W	3,655 feet (1,114 m)
Bethesda	Douglas	former post office		
Bethune	Kit Carson	statutory town	39.3042°N 102.4246°W	4,259 feet (1,298 m)
Beuck	Elbert	ghost town		
Beulah (Note: The Beulah post office serves Beulah Valley.)	Pueblo	unincorporated community	38.0750°N 104.9867°W	6,381 feet (1,945 m)
Beulah Valley	Pueblo	census-designated place	38.0722°N 104.9664°W	6,171 feet (1,881 m)
Beverly Hills	Douglas	unincorporated community	39.4747°N 104.8774°W	6,398 feet (1,950 m)
Biedell	Saguache	former post office		
Big Bend	Bent	unincorporated community	38.2014°N 102.7508°W	3,816 feet (1,163 m)
Big Elk	Boulder	see Big Elk Meadows		
Big Elk Meadows	Larimer	unincorporated community	40.2619°N 105.4303°W	7,526 feet (2,294 m)
Big Elk Meadows	Boulder	unincorporated community	40.2619°N 105.4303°W	7,526 feet (2,294 m)
Big Sandy	El Paso	former post office		
Big Thompson	Larimer	see Fort Namaqua		
Bighorn	Eagle	ghost town	39.6367°N 106.2972°W	8,478 feet (2,584 m)
Bighorn	Jackson	former post office		
Biglow	Pitkin	unincorporated community	39.3436°N 106.6673°W	8,337 feet (2,541 m)
Bijou	Elbert	unincorporated community	39.4225°N 104.1983°W	6,158 feet (1,877 m)
Bijou Basin	El Paso	ghost town		
Bijou View	Morgan	former post office		
Bijouview	Morgan	see Bijou View		
Bird	Adams	former post office		
Birdseye	Lake	unincorporated community	39.3111°N 106.2275°W	10,207 feet (3,111 m)
Birmingham	Huerfano	former post office		
Bismark	Saguache	former post office		
Bittner	Gunnison	former post office		
Black Forest	El Paso	census-designated place	39.0130°N 104.7008°W	7,369 feet (2,246 m)
Black Hawk (Note: Black Hawk is the least populous home rule city in Colorado.)	Gilpin	home rule city	39.8038°N 105.4952°W	8,533 feet (2,601 m)
Black Hawk Point	Gilpin	see Black Hawk		
Black Hollow Junction	Larimer	unincorporated community	40.5961°N 105.0294°W	4,961 feet (1,512 m)
Black Mountain	Park	former post office		
Black Wolf	Yuma	former post office		
Blackburn	Custer	former post office		
Blackhawk	Gilpin	see Black Hawk		
Blackwell	Prowers	former post office		
Blaine	Baca	former post office		
Blaine	Eagle	former post office		
Blainvale	Rio Grande	former post office		
Blakeland	Douglas	unincorporated community	39.5597°N 105.0367°W	5,423 feet (1,653 m)
Blanca	Costilla	statutory town	37.4381°N 105.5158°W	7,756 feet (2,364 m)
Bland	Elbert	former post office		
Blende	Pueblo	census-designated place	38.2470°N 104.5715°W	4,741 feet (1,445 m)
Bloom	Otero	ghost town	37.6875°N 103.9566°W	4,800 feet (1,463 m)
Blue Mountain	Moffat	unincorporated community	40.2483°N 108.8618°W	5,823 feet (1,775 m)
Blue River	Summit	statutory town	39.4297°N 106.0439°W	10,036 feet (3,059 m)
Blue Sky	Morgan	census-designated place	40.3001°N 103.8055°W	4,386 feet (1,337 m)
Blue Valley	Clear Creek	census-designated place	39.6997°N 105.4892°W	9,281 feet (2,829 m)
Blumenau	Custer	former post office		
Boaz	Teller	former post office		
Bockman Lumber Camp	Jackson	ghost town	40.5583°N 105.9658°W	9,045 feet (2,757 m)
Boggsville‡ (Note: Boggsville served as the seat of Bent County, Colorado Territory from 1870 until 1872.)	Bent	ghost town	38.0417°N 103.2127°W	3,914 feet (1,193 m)
Boiler	Larimer	former post office		
Bolton	Yuma	former post office		
Bonanza	Saguache	statutory town	38.2947°N 106.1422°W	9,478 feet (2,889 m)
Bonanza City	Saguache	see Bonanza		
Bonanza Mountain Estates	Boulder	census-designated place	39.9767°N 105.4803°W	8,445 feet (2,574 m)
Boncarbo	Las Animas	unincorporated community	37.2167°N 104.6950°W	6,877 feet (2,096 m)
Bond	Eagle	unincorporated community	39.8744°N 106.6873°W	6,739 feet (2,054 m)
Bond	Lake	former post office		
Bondad	La Plata	unincorporated community	37.0458°N 107.8762°W	6,033 feet (1,839 m)
Bonita	Saguache	unincorporated community	38.2328°N 106.2150°W	9,334 feet (2,845 m)
Bonito	Saguache	former post office		
Bonny	Kit Carson	former post office		
Boone	Pueblo	statutory town	38.2486°N 104.2569°W	4,465 feet (1,361 m)
Booneville	Pueblo	see Boone		
Bordenville	Park	unincorporated community	39.2761°N 105.6836°W	8,996 feet (2,742 m)
Boreas	Summit	former post office		
Boston	Summit	former statutory town	39.4181°N 106.1513°W	
Boston Heights	Adams	Aurora neighborhood	39.7436°N 104.8517°W	5,371 feet (1,637 m)
Boulder† (Note: On November 28, 1859, the Provisional Government of the Territory of Jefferson created 12 counties, with Boulder City as the seat of Jackson County, Jefferson Territory. On November 1, 1861, the new Territory of Colorado created 17 original counties, with Boulder City as the seat of Boulder County, Colorado Territory, and since statehood on August 1, 1876, Boulder has been the seat of Boulder County, Colorado.)	Boulder	home rule city	40.0150°N 105.2705°W	5,318 feet (1,621 m)
Boulder City‡	Boulder	see Boulder		
Boulder County		county	40.0925°N 105.3577°W	
Bountiful	Conejos	unincorporated community	37.2292°N 105.9770°W	7,644 feet (2,330 m)
Bovina	Lincoln	unincorporated community	39.2803°N 103.3852°W	5,348 feet (1,630 m)
Bow Mar	Arapahoe	statutory town	39.6283°N 105.0500°W	5,518 feet (1,682 m)
Bow Mar	Jefferson	statutory town	39.6283°N 105.0500°W	5,518 feet (1,682 m)
Bowen	Las Animas	ghost town		
Bowen	Rio Grande	ghost town		
Bowenton	Mineral	former post office		
Bowerman	Gilpin	see Nugget		
Bowerman	Gunnison	former post office		
Bowie	Delta	unincorporated community	38.9214°N 107.5401°W	5,965 feet (1,818 m)
Bowman	Gunnison	former post office		
Bowser	Kit Carson	former post office		
Box Elder (1876)	Larimer	see Bristol		
Box Elder (1884)	Larimer	see Boxelder		
Box Prairie	Larimer	unincorporated community	40.5814°N 105.4689°W	8,287 feet (2,526 m)
Boxelder	Larimer	former post office		
Boyero	Lincoln	unincorporated community	38.9428°N 103.2791°W	4,721 feet (1,439 m)
Bracewell	Weld	unincorporated community	40.4594°N 104.8172°W	4,738 feet (1,444 m)
Braddock	Summit	see Braddoks		
Braddocks	Summit	see Braddoks		
Braddoks	Summit	former statutory town	39.5296°N 106.0439°W	
Bradford	Huerfano	unincorporated community	37.8814°N 105.3331°W	8,048 feet (2,453 m)
Bragdon	Pueblo	unincorporated community	38.4019°N 104.6116°W	4,951 feet (1,509 m)
Brandon	Kiowa	census-designated place	38.4464°N 102.4396°W	3,927 feet (1,197 m)
Brandywine	Broomfield	Broomfield neighborhood	39.9236°N 105.0364°W	5,253 feet (1,601 m)
Branson	Las Animas	statutory town	37.0175°N 103.8844°W	6,270 feet (1,911 m)
Brazil	Las Animas	former post office		
Breckenridge† (Note: On November 28, 1859, the Provisional Government of the Territory of Jefferson created 12 counties, with Breckenridge as the seat of Saratoga County, Jefferson Territory. On January 18, 1860, the spelling of the town's name was changed to Breckinridge in honor of U.S. Vice President John Cabell Breckinridge. On December 2, 1861, after John Breckinridge accepted a commission as a brigadier general in the Confederate States Army, the town changed its name back to the original Breckenridge. In 1862, county voters selected Breckenridge as the new seat of Summit County, Colorado Territory, and since statehood on August 1, 1876, the seat of Summit County, Colorado.)	Summit	home rule town	39.4817°N 106.0384°W	9,728 feet (2,965 m)
Breckinridge‡	Summit	see Breckenridge		
Breen	La Plata	unincorporated community	37.1925°N 108.0779°W	7,346 feet (2,239 m)
Brewster	Fremont	former post office		
Briargate	El Paso	Colorado Springs neighborhood		
Brick Center	Arapahoe	census-designated place	39.6001°N 104.4579°W	5,823 feet (1,775 m)
Bridgeport	Mesa	unincorporated community	38.8367°N 108.3806°W	4,738 feet (1,444 m)
Bridges Switch	Mesa	unincorporated community	39.0986°N 108.4040°W	4,695 feet (1,431 m)
Bridle Dale	Jefferson	unincorporated community	39.8436°N 105.1156°W	5,577 feet (1,700 m)
Briggsdale	Weld	census-designated place	40.6347°N 104.3269°W	4,865 feet (1,483 m)
Brighton† (Note: Brighton has been the seat of Adams County, Colorado since the county was created on November 15, 1902.)	Adams	home rule city	39.9853°N 104.8205°W	4,987 feet (1,520 m)
Brighton†	Weld	home rule city	39.9853°N 104.8205°W	4,987 feet (1,520 m)
Brightside	Jefferson	former post office		
Brimstone Corner	Delta	unincorporated community	38.9380°N 107.9753°W	6,486 feet (1,977 m)
Bristol	Larimer	former post office		
Bristol	Prowers	unincorporated community	38.1222°N 102.3116°W	3,560 feet (1,085 m)
Broadlands	Broomfield	Broomfield neighborhood	39.9506°N 105.0389°W	5,285 feet (1,611 m)
Broadlands West	Broomfield	Broomfield neighborhood	39.9456°N 105.0472°W	5,322 feet (1,622 m)
Broadmoor	El Paso	Colorado Springs neighborhood	38.7955°N 104.8414°W	6,161 feet (1,878 m)
Broadway Estates	Arapahoe	Centennial neighborhood	39.5900°N 104.9836°W	5,518 feet (1,682 m)
Brodhead	Las Animas	ghost town		
Broken Arrow Acres	Jefferson	unincorporated community	39.5028°N 105.3267°W	8,484 feet (2,586 m)
Bronquist	Pueblo	unincorporated community	38.2019°N 104.8917°W	5,325 feet (1,623 m)
Brook Forest	Jefferson	census-designated place	39.5794°N 105.3819°W	8,035 feet (2,449 m)
Brook Forest	Clear Creek	census-designated place	39.5794°N 105.3819°W	8,035 feet (2,449 m)
Brookfield	Baca	ghost town	37.5939°N 102.8421°W	4,570 feet (1,393 m)
Brookside	Fremont	statutory town	38.4153°N 105.1919°W	5,348 feet (1,630 m)
Brookston	Routt	former post office		
Brookvale	Arapahoe	Aurora neighborhood	39.6917°N 104.8000°W	5,505 feet (1,678 m)
Brookvale	Clear Creek	unincorporated community	39.6297°N 105.4192°W	7,598 feet (2,316 m)
City and County of Broomfield (Note: The City and County of Broomfield was consolidated on November 15, 2001.)		consolidated city and county	39.9205°N 105.0867°W	5,390 feet (1,643 m)
Broomfield Heights	Broomfield	Broomfield neighborhood	39.9381°N 105.0753°W	5,430 feet (1,655 m)
Broughton	Delta	unincorporated community	38.8133°N 108.3270°W	4,767 feet (1,453 m)
Brown	Montrose	see Olathe		
Brown Cañon	Chaffee	see Browns Cañon		
Brownlee	Jackson	unincorporated community	40.7847°N 106.2867°W	8,005 feet (2,440 m)
Browns Cañon	Chaffee	former post office	38.6119°N 106.0600°W	7,316 feet (2,230 m)
Browns Canyon	Chaffee	see Browns Cañon		
Browns Corner	Larimer	unincorporated community	40.4075°N 105.0589°W	4,990 feet (1,521 m)
Brownsville	Clear Creek	former post office		
Brownville	Jefferson	former post office		
Broyles	Conejos	former post office		
Bruce	Weld	unincorporated community	40.4958°N 104.8644°W	4,820 feet (1,469 m)
Brumley	Lake	ghost town	39.0894°N 106.5428°W	10,607 feet (3,233 m)
Brunker	Washington	former post office		
Brush	Morgan	statutory city	40.2589°N 103.6238°W	4,219 feet (1,286 m)
Bryant	Yuma	former post office		
Buchanan	Logan	unincorporated community	40.8319°N 103.1685°W	4,131 feet (1,259 m)
Buckeye	Larimer	unincorporated community	40.8272°N 105.0950°W	5,663 feet (1,726 m)
Buckeye Crossroads	Baca	unincorporated community	37.5575°N 102.1288°W	3,763 feet (1,147 m)
Buckhorn	Larimer	former post office		
Buckingham	Arapahoe	Aurora neighborhood		
Buckingham	Larimer	Fort Collins neighborhood	40.5905°N 105.0661°W	4,951 feet (1,509 m)
Buckingham	Weld	ghost town	40.6214°N 103.9777°W	4,944 feet (1,507 m)
Buckley	Baca	see Lycan		
Buckley Space Force Base	Arapahoe	U.S. Space Force		
Buckskin‡ (Note: On January 7, 1862, county voters selected Laurette as the new seat of Park County, Colorado Territory. On December 21, 1865, Laurette changed its name to Buckskin, commonly known as Buckskin Joe. Buckskin Joe served as county seat until November 7, 1867.)	Park	see Buckskin Joe, Park County		
Buckskin Joe	Fremont	former post office	38.4764°N 105.3269°W	6,299 feet (1,920 m)
Buckskin Joe‡	Park	ghost town		
Buda	Weld	unincorporated community	40.3286°N 104.9778°W	4,984 feet (1,519 m)
Buena Vista‡ (Note: Buena Vista served as the seat of Chaffee County, Colorado from 1888 until 1928.)	Chaffee	statutory town	38.8422°N 106.1311°W	7,959 feet (2,426 m)
Buffalo	Logan	see Merino		
Buffalo Creek	Jefferson	unincorporated community	39.3867°N 105.2703°W	6,749 feet (2,057 m)
Buffalo Springs	Park	former post office		
Buffer	Summit	former post office		
Buford	Rio Blanco	unincorporated community	39.9872°N 107.6167°W	7,028 feet (2,142 m)
Buick	Elbert	see Beuck		
Bulger	Larimer	former post office	40.7936°N 104.9825°W	5,499 feet (1,676 m)
Bulkley	Boulder	unincorporated community		
Bulkley	San Miguel	former post office		
Bunce	Boulder	former post office		
Bunell	Adams	see Fitzsimons		
Bunyan	Weld	unincorporated community	40.2903°N 104.9153°W	4,925 feet (1,501 m)
Burdett	Washington	unincorporated community	40.3655°N 102.9510°W	4,262 feet (1,299 m)
Burlington	Boulder	former post office		
Burlington† (Note: Burlington has been the seat of Kit Carson County, Colorado since the county was created on April 11, 1889.)	Kit Carson	home rule city	39.3061°N 102.2694°W	4,170 feet (1,271 m)
Burning Tree Ranch	Douglas	unincorporated community	39.3974°N 104.7316°W	6,381 feet (1,945 m)
Burns	Eagle	unincorporated community	39.8739°N 106.8856°W	6,493 feet (1,979 m)
Burnt Mill	Pueblo	unincorporated community	38.0517°N 104.7964°W	5,374 feet (1,638 m)
Burrows Park	Hinsdale	see White Cross		
Burt	El Paso	former post office		
Bush	Larimer	see Adams		
Busk	Lake	former post office		
Buster	Baca	former post office		
Butler	Jackson	former post office		
Butte Valley (1869)	Huerfano	former post office		
Butte Valley (1938)	Huerfano	see Alamo		
Buttes	El Paso	Fountain neighborhood	38.5872°N 104.6672°W	5,335 feet (1,626 m)
Buzzard's Roost	Custer	see Fort Le Duc		
Byers	Arapahoe	census-designated place	39.7114°N 104.2277°W	5,203 feet (1,586 m)

== C ==
Select the OpenStreetMap link at the right to view the location of places in this section.

Place	County	Type	Location	Elevation
Cabin Creek	Adams	unincorporated community	39.7405°N 104.0305°W	5,062 feet (1,543 m)
Cabin Springs	Pueblo	see Stone City		
Cable	Lincoln	see Genoa		
Cacharas	Huerfano	see Cucharas		
Caddoa	Bent	ghost town	38.0478°N 102.9660°W	3,881 feet (1,183 m)
Cadet	El Paso	see the United States Air Force Academy		
Cahone	Dolores	unincorporated community	37.6589°N 108.8079°W	6,680 feet (2,036 m)
Caisson	Moffat	former post office		
Calcite	Fremont	ghost town	38.4361°N 105.8872°W	7,602 feet (2,317 m)
Calcium	Pitkin	see Thomasville		
Calhan	El Paso	statutory town	39.0355°N 104.2972°W	6,535 feet (1,992 m)
Calhoun	Washington	unincorporated community	40.1425°N 102.8905°W	4,268 feet (1,301 m)
California Ranch‡ (Note: On November 1, 1861, the Territory of Colorado created 17 original counties, with Frankstown as the original seat of Douglas County, Colorado Territory. In 1864, the county seat and its post office moved 3 miles (5 km) south to the California Ranch stage stop, which took the name Franktown. Franktown served as the county seat until 1874.)	Douglas	see Franktown		
Calumet	Chaffee	former post office		
Calumet	Huerfano	ghost town		
Calvert	Logan	see Fleming		
Camargo	Custer	former post office		
Cambridge Park	Jefferson	Lakewood neighborhood	39.7711°N 105.1128°W	5,381 feet (1,640 m)
Camden	Morgan	unincorporated community	40.3041°N 103.5491°W	4,193 feet (1,278 m)
Cameo	Mesa	ghost town	39.1486°N 108.3209°W	4,787 feet (1,459 m)
Cameo Estates	Jefferson	Arvada neighborhood	39.8386°N 105.1531°W	5,522 feet (1,683 m)
Cameron	Teller	former post office		
Cameville	Montrose	former post office		
Camfield	Weld	former post office		
Camp Amache	Prowers	see Amache National Historic Site		
Camp at Animas City	La Plata	see Fort Flagler		
Camp at White River	Rio Blanco	see Fort Meeker		
Camp Bird	Ouray	unincorporated community	37.9728°N 107.7264°W	9,728 feet (2,965 m)
Camp Carson	El Paso	see Fort Carson		
Camp Collins	Larimer	see Fort Collins		
Camp Genter	Gunnison	former post office		
Camp Hale	Eagle	historic U.S. Army post	39.4362°N 106.3219°W	9,229 feet (2,813 m)
Camp Rankin	Sedgwick	see Fort Sedgwick		
Camp Shumway	Huerfano	former post office		
Camp Speer	Adams	former post office		
Camp Tyler	Morgan	see Fort Morgan		
Camp Wardwell	Morgan	see Fort Morgan		
Camp Weld	Denver	see Fort Weld		
Campbelltown	Gunnison	ghost town	38.6122°N 106.5653°W	10,502 feet (3,201 m)
Campbird	Ouray	see Camp Bird		
Campion	Larimer	unincorporated community	40.3494°N 105.0778°W	5,115 feet (1,559 m)
Campo	Baca	statutory town	37.1050°N 102.5796°W	4,344 feet (1,324 m)
Canadian	Jackson	former post office		
Candelas	Jefferson	Arvada neighborhood		
Candlelight	Jefferson	Arvada neighborhood	39.8036°N 105.1536°W	5,568 feet (1,697 m)
Canfield	Boulder	unincorporated community	40.0536°N 105.0747°W	5,033 feet (1,534 m)
Cañon	Conejos	unincorporated community	37.0433°N 106.1459°W	8,189 feet (2,496 m)
Canon City (Note: On November 1, 1861, the new Territory of Colorado created 17 original counties, with Cañon City as the seat of Fremont County, Colorado Territory, and since statehood on August 1, 1876, the seat of Fremont County, Colorado. Cañon City has also been spelled Canon City and Canyon City.)	Fremont	see Cañon City		
Cañon City†	Fremont	home rule city	38.4410°N 105.2424°W	5,351 feet (1,631 m)
Canton	Weld	unincorporated community	40.3158°N 104.3461°W	4,495 feet (1,370 m)
Cantonment at Pagosa Springs	Archuleta	see Fort Lewis (1878–1880)		
Cantonment at Uncompahgre	Montrose	see Fort Crawford		
Cantonment on White River	Rio Blanco	see Fort Meeker		
Canyon City	Fremont	see Cañon City		
Capers Spur	Pueblo	ghost town	37.9093°N 104.7072°W	5,735 feet (1,748 m)
Capitol City	Hinsdale	ghost town	38.0072°N 107.4667°W	9,711 feet (2,960 m)
Capitol Hill	Denver	Denver neighborhood	39.7338°N 104.9823°W	5,277 feet (1,608 m)
Capps	Huerfano	former post office		
Capulin	Conejos	census-designated place	37.2819°N 106.1049°W	7,805 feet (2,379 m)
Carbon Junction	La Plata	unincorporated community	37.2375°N 107.8667°W	6,411 feet (1,954 m)
Carbonate‡ (Note: Carbonate served as the original seat of Garfield County, Colorado for several months after the county was created on February 10, 1883.)	Garfield	ghost town	39.7430°N 107.3467°W	10,925 feet (3,330 m)
Carbonate City	Summit	see Carbonateville		
Carbonateville	Summit	former statutory town		
Carbondale	Garfield	home rule town	39.4022°N 107.2112°W	6,171 feet (1,881 m)
Carbonera	Garfield	unincorporated community	39.4589°N 108.9590°W	5,515 feet (1,681 m)
Cardiff	Garfield	unincorporated community	39.5061°N 107.3109°W	5,935 feet (1,809 m)
Cardinal	Boulder	ghost town	39.9697°N 105.5478°W	8,704 feet (2,653 m)
Carey	Kit Carson	former post office		
Carey	Pitkin	former post office		
Caribou	Boulder	ghost town	39.9808°N 105.5786°W	9,970 feet (3,039 m)
Caribou City	Boulder	unincorporated community	39.9900°N 105.5128°W	8,435 feet (2,571 m)
Carlisle	Kit Carson	former post office		
Carlton	Prowers	unincorporated community	38.0847°N 102.4196°W	3,537 feet (1,078 m)
Carmel	Chaffee	former post office		
Carmody Estates	Jefferson	Lakewood neighborhood	39.6783°N 105.1136°W	5,646 feet (1,721 m)
Carnero	Saguache	former post office		
Carpenter	Mesa	ghost town	39.1944°N 108.4733°W	5,808 feet (1,770 m)
Carr	Weld	unincorporated community	40.8961°N 104.8750°W	5,712 feet (1,741 m)
Carr Crossing	Lincoln	former post office		
Carracas	Archuleta	unincorporated community	37.0050°N 107.2587°W	6,175 feet (1,882 m)
Carriage Club	Douglas	Lone Tree neighborhood	39.5325°N 104.9011°W	6,014 feet (1,833 m)
Carriage Club CDP	Douglas	see Carriage Club		
Carriso	Baca	see Carrizo		
Carriso Springs	Baca	see Carrizo Spring		
Carrizo	Baca	former post office		
Carrizo Springs	Baca	unincorporated community	37.1636°N 103.0349°W	4,859 feet (1,481 m)
Carson (Note: Located at an elevation of 11,574 feet (3,528 m), the Carson, Colorado post office was the highest in the United States from September 16, 1889 to June 14, 1895.)	Hinsdale	ghost town		
Carson	Huerfano	former post office		
Carsonhart	Las Animas	former post office		
Carterville	Eagle	unincorporated community	39.6308°N 106.6461°W	7,595 feet (2,315 m)
Cary	Arapahoe	former post office		
Cary Ranch	Routt	former post office		
Casa	Otero	unincorporated community	38.0092°N 103.4722°W	4,029 feet (1,228 m)
Cascade	El Paso	unincorporated community	38.8967°N 104.9722°W	7,379 feet (2,249 m)
Cascade	La Plata	unincorporated community	37.6033°N 107.7626°W	7,789 feet (2,374 m)
Cascade-Chipita Park CDP	El Paso	census-designated place	38.9433°N 105.0023°W	8,432 feet (2,570 m)
Case	Douglas	former post office		
Cash Creek	Chaffee	former post office		
Cashin	Montrose	former post office		
Castelar	La Plata	former post office		
Castiel	Otero	unincorporated community	38.1072°N 103.4630°W	4,134 feet (1,260 m)
Castle (Note: Castle changed its name to Eagle on September 3, 1891. Eagle has served as the seat of Eagle County, Colorado since 1921.)	Eagle	see Eagle		
Castle Forks City	Pitkin	see Ashcroft		
Castle Oaks	Douglas	Castle Rock neighborhood	39.3920°N 104.8107°W	6,467 feet (1,971 m)
Castle Pines	Douglas	home rule city	39.4717°N 104.8948°W	6,371 feet (1,942 m)
Castle Pines North	Douglas	see Castle Pines		
Castle Pines Village	Douglas	census-designated place	39.4319°N 104.8919°W	6,138 feet (1,871 m)
Castle Rock (1871)	Douglas	see Douglas		
Castle Rock† (Note: In 1874, county voters selected Castle Rock as the new seat of Douglas County, Colorado Territory, and since statehood on August 1, 1876, the seat of Douglas County, Colorado.)	Douglas	home rule town	39.3722°N 104.8561°W	6,217 feet (1,895 m)
Castleton	Gunnison	former post office		
Castlewood	Arapahoe	Centennial neighborhood	39.5847°N 104.9011°W	5,728 feet (1,746 m)
Castlewood CDP	Arapahoe	see Castlewood		
Castlewood North	Douglas	unincorporated community	39.3843°N 104.7767°W	6,247 feet (1,904 m)
Cathedral	Hinsdale	census-designated place	38.0836°N 107.0307°W	9,242 feet (2,817 m)
Catherin	Alamosa	former post office		
Catherin	Garfield	see Catherine		
Catherine	Garfield	census-designated place	39.4013°N 107.1241°W	6,348 feet (1,935 m)
Catlin	Otero	see Manzanola		
Cattle Creek	Garfield	census-designated place	39.4666°N 107.2599°W	6,247 feet (1,904 m)
Cedar	San Miguel	former post office		
Cedar Brook	Montrose	former post office		
Cedar Cove	Larimer	unincorporated community	40.4158°N 105.2655°W	5,591 feet (1,704 m)
Cedar Creek	Montrose	unincorporated community	38.4789°N 107.7145°W	6,762 feet (2,061 m)
Cedar Crest	Pueblo	unincorporated community	37.8070°N 104.2986°W	5,489 feet (1,673 m)
Cedar Grove	Pueblo	unincorporated community	38.0750°N 104.9389°W	6,083 feet (1,854 m)
Cedar Point	Elbert	unincorporated community	39.3453°N 103.8705°W	5,712 feet (1,741 m)
Cedaredge	Delta	home rule town	38.9016°N 107.9265°W	6,230 feet (1,899 m)
Cedarhurst	Las Animas	former post office		
Cedarwood	Pueblo	unincorporated community	37.9417°N 104.6175°W	5,604 feet (1,708 m)
Cement Creek	San Juan	former post office		
Cenicero	Conejos	see Lobatos		
Centennial	Arapahoe	home rule city	39.5792°N 104.8769°W	5,837 feet (1,779 m)
Center	Saguache	statutory town	37.7531°N 106.1086°W	7,644 feet (2,330 m)
Center	Rio Grande	statutory town	37.7531°N 106.1086°W	7,644 feet (2,330 m)
Centerview	Saguache	see Center		
Centerview	Rio Grande	see Center		
Centerville	Chaffee	unincorporated community	38.7089°N 106.0917°W	7,851 feet (2,393 m)
Central Business District	Denver	see Downtown Denver		
Central City† (Note: On November 28, 1859, the Provisional Government of the Territory of Jefferson created 12 counties, with Central City as the seat of Mountain County, Jefferson Territory. On November 1, 1861, the new Territory of Colorado created 17 original counties, with Central City as the seat of Gilpin County, Colorado Territory, and since statehood on August 1, 1876, the seat of Gilpin County, Colorado.)	Gilpin	home rule city	39.8019°N 105.5142°W	8,497 feet (2,590 m)
Central City†	Clear Creek	home rule city	39.8019°N 105.5142°W	8,497 feet (2,590 m)
Central Park	Denver	Denver neighborhood		
Centrepoint	Arapahoe	Aurora neighborhood	39.7064°N 104.8153°W	5,509 feet (1,679 m)
Centro	Conejos	unincorporated community	37.2839°N 106.1475°W	7,887 feet (2,404 m)
Chacra	Garfield	census-designated place	39.5770°N 107.4509°W	5,722 feet (1,744 m)
Chadsford	Arapahoe	Aurora neighborhood	39.6725°N 104.8161°W	5,620 feet (1,713 m)
Chaffee	Chaffee	see Monarch		
Chaffee County		county	38.7466°N 106.1938°W	
Chaffee Park	Denver	Denver neighborhood		
Chalk Creek	Chaffee	see Nathrop		
Chama	Costilla	unincorporated community	37.1620°N 105.3783°W	8,186 feet (2,495 m)
Chama	Huerfano	unincorporated community	37.7189°N 105.2989°W	7,881 feet (2,402 m)
Chambers	Larimer	former post office		
Chambers Heights	Arapahoe	Aurora neighborhood	39.7322°N 104.8161°W	5,433 feet (1,656 m)
Chambers Lake	Larimer	former post office		
Chance	Gunnison	unincorporated community	38.4372°N 106.8498°W	9,203 feet (2,805 m)
Chandler	Fremont	ghost town	38.3731°N 105.2005°W	5,738 feet (1,749 m)
Chaney	Gunnison	former post office		
Channing	Prowers	unincorporated community	38.1436°N 102.5494°W	3,661 feet (1,116 m)
Chapel	Las Animas	former post office		
Chapel	Las Animas	see Graycreek		
Chapin	Kit Carson	former post office		
Chapman	Garfield	see New Castle		
Chapparal	Arapahoe	Aurora neighborhood	39.5869°N 104.7658°W	5,965 feet (1,818 m)
Chase	Park	former post office		
Chattanooga	San Juan	ghost town	37.8736°N 107.7253°W	10,262 feet (3,128 m)
Chedsey	Jackson	former post office		
Cheeseman	Jefferson	former post office		
Cheesman Park	Denver	Denver neighborhood		
Chemung	Cheyenne	former post office		
Cheney Center	Prowers	former post office		
Chenoa	Logan	former post office		
Chenoweth	Elbert	former post office		
Cheraw	Otero	statutory town	38.1070°N 103.5102°W	4,131 feet (1,259 m)
Cherokee City (Note: On November 25, 1863, Cherokee City changed its name to Latham. Latham served as the seat of Weld County, Colorado Territory from 1868 until 1870.)	Weld	see Evans		
Cherokee Park	Larimer	former post office		
Cherrelyn	Arapahoe	former post office		
Cherry	Douglas	former post office		
Cherry Creek	Arapahoe	census-designated place	39.6345°N 104.8829°W	5,643 feet (1,720 m)
Cherry Creek	Denver	Denver neighborhood		
Cherry Creek Diggings	Denver	see Auraria		
Cherry Creek East	Arapahoe	Aurora neighborhood	39.5992°N 104.8014°W	5,689 feet (1,734 m)
Cherry Creek Highlands	Douglas	unincorporated community	39.5012°N 104.7865°W	5,915 feet (1,803 m)
Cherry Hills Village	Arapahoe	home rule city	39.6417°N 104.9594°W	5,423 feet (1,653 m)
Cherry Knolls	Arapahoe	Centennial neighborhood	39.5917°N 104.9508°W	5,607 feet (1,709 m)
Cherry Ridge	Arapahoe	Cherry Hills Village neighborhood	39.6267°N 104.9389°W	5,492 feet (1,674 m)
Chester	Saguache	unincorporated community	38.3736°N 106.3017°W	9,400 feet (2,865 m)
Cheyenne County		county	38.8282°N 102.6034°W	
Cheyenne Wells† (Note: Cheyenne Wells has been the seat of Cheyenne County, Colorado since the county was created on March 25, 1889.)	Cheyenne	statutory town	38.8214°N 102.3532°W	4,291 feet (1,308 m)
Chicosa	Las Animas	former post office		
Chihuahua	Summit	former statutory town	39.5706°N 105.8600°W	
Chilcott	Pueblo	former post office		
Chimney Rock	Archuleta	ghost town	37.1944°N 107.3012°W	7,867 feet (2,398 m)
Chipeta	Delta	unincorporated community	38.6811°N 108.0090°W	5,151 feet (1,570 m)
Chipeta	Montrose	see Naturita		
Chipeta	Pitkin	former post office		
Chipita Park	El Paso	unincorporated community	38.9244°N 105.0066°W	7,795 feet (2,376 m)
Chivington	Kiowa	ghost town	38.4364°N 102.5435°W	3,891 feet (1,186 m)
Chloride	Pitkin	see Ashcroft		
Chromo	Archuleta	unincorporated community	37.0364°N 106.8434°W	7,283 feet (2,220 m)
Churchhill Downs	Jefferson	unincorporated community	39.8439°N 105.1217°W	5,610 feet (1,710 m)
Cimarron	Elbert	unincorporated community	39.3736°N 104.6278°W	6,578 feet (2,005 m)
Cimarron	Montrose	unincorporated community	38.4425°N 107.5567°W	6,896 feet (2,102 m)
Cimarron Hills	El Paso	census-designated place	38.8586°N 104.6989°W	6,447 feet (1,965 m)
City Park	Denver	Denver neighborhood		
City Park West	Denver	Denver neighborhood		
Civic Center	Denver	see Denver Civic Center		
Clanda	Las Animas	former post office		
Claremont	Kit Carson	see Stratton		
Clarence	Kit Carson	former post office		
Clark	Routt	unincorporated community	40.7061°N 106.9192°W	7,260 feet (2,213 m)
Clarke Farms	Douglas	Parker neighborhood	39.5272°N 104.7881°W	5,837 feet (1,779 m)
Clarkson	Grand	former post office		
Clarkville	Yuma	ghost town	40.3950°N 102.6260°W	4,016 feet (1,224 m)
Claud	Elbert	former post office		
Clayton	Denver	Denver neighborhood		
Claytonia	Saguache	former post office		
Clear Creek County		county	39.6891°N 105.6443°W	
Clearwater	Sedgwick	see Julesburg		
Clemmons	Elbert	see Schley		
Cleora	Chaffee	unincorporated community	38.5133°N 105.9700°W	7,001 feet (2,134 m)
Clermont	Elbert	former post office		
Cleveland	Custer	former post office		
Cleveland	Eagle	former post office		
Cliff	Jefferson	see Cliffdale		
Cliffdale	Jefferson	unincorporated community	39.4086°N 105.3764°W	6,985 feet (2,129 m)
Clifton	Custer	see Westcliffe		
Clifton	Mesa	census-designated place	39.0919°N 108.4490°W	4,721 feet (1,439 m)
Climax	Lake	ghost town	39.3689°N 106.1836°W	11,342 feet (3,457 m)
Clinton	Custer	former post office		
Clinton City	Summit	former statutory town	39.4126°N 106.1911°W	
Clonmell	Fremont	see Cramer		
Cloud	Gunnison	former post office		
Cloudcrest	Jefferson	former post office		
Clover	Huerfano	former post office		
Clover	Mesa	former post office		
Cloverly	Weld	unincorporated community	40.4566°N 104.6264°W	4,695 feet (1,431 m)
Club Crest	Jefferson	Arvada neighborhood	39.8325°N 105.1025°W	5,607 feet (1,709 m)
Clyde	Baca	former post office		
Clyde	Teller	former post office		
Coal Creek	Fremont	statutory town	38.3611°N 105.1483°W	5,427 feet (1,654 m)
Coal Creek	Jefferson	census-designated place	39.9064°N 105.3775°W	8,586 feet (2,617 m)
Coal Creek	Boulder	census-designated place	39.9064°N 105.3775°W	8,586 feet (2,617 m)
Coal Creek	Gilpin	census-designated place	39.9064°N 105.3775°W	8,586 feet (2,617 m)
Coal Park	Boulder	former post office		
Coalby	Delta	former post office		
Coalcreek	Fremont	see Coal Creek		
Coaldale	Fremont	census-designated place	38.3557°N 105.8131°W	8,750 feet (2,667 m)
Coalmont	Jackson	ghost town	40.5625°N 106.4445°W	8,215 feet (2,504 m)
Coalridge	Gunnison	see Vulcan		
Coalview	Routt	former post office		
Coburn	Delta	unincorporated community	38.8467°N 107.6359°W	5,545 feet (1,690 m)
Cochem	Chaffee	former post office		
Cochetopa	Gunnison	former post office		
Cockrell	Conejos	former post office		
Codo	Huerfano	unincorporated community	37.5022°N 105.1472°W	8,474 feet (2,583 m)
Cody Park	Jefferson	unincorporated community	39.7158°N 105.2703°W	7,352 feet (2,241 m)
Cokedale	Las Animas	statutory town	37.1453°N 104.6211°W	6,319 feet (1,926 m)
Colby	Delta	unincorporated community	38.9316°N 107.9753°W	6,362 feet (1,939 m)
Cold Spring	Custer	unincorporated community	38.1494°N 105.2425°W	8,780 feet (2,676 m)
Cole	Denver	Denver neighborhood		
Cole	Kit Carson	former post office		
Coleman	Weld	former post office		
Coleyville	Summit	see Saints John		
Colfax	Custer	ghost town		
Colfax (Note: The City of Denver annexed the Town of Colfax on June 23, 1897.)	Denver	former statutory town	39.7404°N 105.0393°W	
Colfax	Douglas	former post office		
Colfax Village	Arapahoe	Aurora neighborhood	39.7292°N 104.8706°W	5,397 feet (1,645 m)
Collbran	Mesa	statutory town	39.2405°N 107.9612°W	5,988 feet (1,825 m)
College Hills	Adams	Westminster neighborhood	39.9039°N 105.0306°W	5,256 feet (1,602 m)
College View	Arapahoe	former post office		
College View	Denver	Denver neighborhood	39.6630°N 105.0216°W	5,430 feet (1,655 m)
College View/South Platte	Denver	Denver neighborhood		
College West Estates	Jefferson	Lakewood neighborhood	39.7186°N 105.1422°W	5,823 feet (1,775 m)
Coloflats	Las Animas	see Branson		
Colona	Larimer	see Laporte		
Colona	Ouray	census-designated place	38.3275°N 107.7793°W	6,375 feet (1,943 m)
Colorado City ⁂ (Note: On November 28, 1859, the Provisional Government of the Territory of Jefferson created 12 counties, with Colorado City as the seat of El Paso County, Jefferson Territory. On November 1, 1861, the new Territory of Colorado created 17 original counties, with Colorado City as the original seat of El Paso County, Colorado Territory. Colorado City served as the second capital of the Colorado Territory from July 7, 1862, until August 14, 1862. In 1873, county voters moved the county seat to Colorado Springs. On June 10, 1917, the City of Colorado Springs annexed Colorado City.)	El Paso	territorial capital	38.8467°N 104.8619°W	
Colorado City	Pueblo	census-designated place	37.9453°N 104.8353°W	5,853 feet (1,784 m)
Colorado Sierra	Gilpin	former post office		
Colorado Springs† (Note: In 1873, county voters selected Colorado Springs as the new seat of El Paso County, Colorado Territory, and since statehood on August 1, 1876, the seat of El Paso County, Colorado.)	El Paso	home rule city	38.8339°N 104.8214°W	6,010 feet (1,832 m)
Colorow	Grand	former post office		
Columbia (Note: On July 26, 1880, Columbia changed its name to Telluride. Telluride has been the seat of San Miguel County, Colorado since the county was created on March 2, 1883.)	San Miguel	see Telluride		
Columbine	Jefferson	census-designated place	39.5878°N 105.0694°W	5,545 feet (1,690 m)
Columbine	Arapahoe	census-designated place	39.5878°N 105.0694°W	5,545 feet (1,690 m)
Columbine	Routt	unincorporated community	40.8541°N 106.9659°W	8,701 feet (2,652 m)
Columbine Acres	Jefferson	Arvada neighborhood	39.7950°N 105.0722°W	5,289 feet (1,612 m)
Columbine Heights	Arapahoe	unincorporated community	39.5964°N 105.0494°W	5,427 feet (1,654 m)
Columbine Hills	Jefferson	unincorporated community	39.5739°N 105.0650°W	5,456 feet (1,663 m)
Columbine Knolls	Jefferson	unincorporated community	39.5775°N 105.0772°W	5,554 feet (1,693 m)
Columbine Lakes	Arapahoe	unincorporated community	39.6047°N 105.0444°W	5,400 feet (1,646 m)
Columbine Manor	Arapahoe	unincorporated community	39.5853°N 105.0519°W	5,436 feet (1,657 m)
Columbine Valley	Arapahoe	statutory town	39.6011°N 105.0322°W	5,348 feet (1,630 m)
Columbus	Chaffee	former post office		
Columbus	La Plata	unincorporated community	37.3278°N 107.6301°W	7,283 feet (2,220 m)
Comanche	Adams	unincorporated community	39.9855°N 104.3005°W	4,934 feet (1,504 m)
Comanche Creek	Arapahoe	census-designated place	39.6150°N 104.3268°W	5,627 feet (1,715 m)
Commerce City	Adams	home rule city	39.8083°N 104.9339°W	5,161 feet (1,573 m)
Commerce Town	Adams	see Commerce City		
Como	Park	unincorporated community	39.3161°N 105.8928°W	9,813 feet (2,991 m)
Concrete	Fremont	unincorporated community	38.3833°N 104.9978°W	5,036 feet (1,535 m)
Condon	Yuma	see Vernon		
Conejos† (Note: In 1863, county voters selected Conejos as the seat of Conejos County, Colorado Territory, and since statehood on August 1, 1876, the seat of Conejos County, Colorado. Conejos is the only remaining unincorporated county seat in Colorado.)	Conejos	census-designated place	37.0873°N 106.0160°W	7,897 feet (2,407 m)
Conejos County		county	37.2008°N 106.1915°W	
Conger	Routt	see Pallas		
Conger	Summit	see Conger's Camp		
Conger's Camp	Summit	former statutory town	39.4339°N 106.0435°W	
Congress	San Juan	former post office		
Congress Park	Denver	Denver neighborhood		
Conifer	Jefferson	unincorporated community	39.5211°N 105.3053°W	8,261 feet (2,518 m)
Conrad	Park	former post office		
Conrow	Chaffee	former post office		
Consolidated	Huerfano	former post office		
Content	La Plata	former post office		
Cooper	Eagle	former post office		
Cope	Washington	census-designated place	39.6639°N 102.8510°W	4,403 feet (1,342 m)
Copper	Mesa	see Ionia		
Copper Mountain	Summit	census-designated place	39.4769°N 106.2011°W	11,362 feet (3,463 m)
Copper Rock	Boulder	former post office		
Copper Spur	Eagle	unincorporated community	39.9105°N 106.6884°W	7,070 feet (2,155 m)
Copperdale	Boulder	unincorporated community	39.9142°N 105.3494°W	7,986 feet (2,434 m)
Copperfield	Fremont	former post office		
Copperton	Eagle	former post office		
Coppertown	Eagle	see Copper Spur		
Coraville	Boulder	former post office		
Coraville	Denver	see Auraria		
Corcoran	Washington	former post office		
Cordova	Las Animas	see Weston		
Cordova Plaza	Las Animas	unincorporated community	37.1334°N 104.8297°W	6,798 feet (2,072 m)
Corinth	Baca	former post office		
Cornelia	Bent	unincorporated community	38.0928°N 103.2883°W	3,967 feet (1,209 m)
Cornell	San Miguel	former post office		
Cornish	Weld	unincorporated community	40.5230°N 104.4133°W	4,715 feet (1,437 m)
Cornwall	Rio Grande	former post office		
Corona	Grand	ghost town	39.9344°N 105.6853°W	11,722 feet (3,573 m)
Corona	Morgan	see Wiggins		
Corrizo	Baca	see Carrizo		
Cortez† (Note: Cortez has been the seat of Montezuma County, Colorado since the county was created on April 16, 1889.)	Montezuma	home rule city	37.3489°N 108.5859°W	6,191 feet (1,887 m)
Cortrite	Park	former post office		
Cory	Delta	unincorporated community	38.7880°N 107.9873°W	5,187 feet (1,581 m)
Coryell	Costilla	see Stanley		
Cory-Merrill	Denver	Denver neighborhood		
Cosden	Gunnison	former post office		
Costilla‡ (Note: On November 1, 1861, the Territory of Colorado created 17 original counties, with San Miguel as the original seat of Costilla County, Colorado Territory. When its post office opened on November 13, 1862, the village selected the new name Costilla, perhaps in recognition of its new status. In 1863, county voters decided to move the county seat 17 miles (27 km) north to San Luis. In 1869, a U.S. government survey determined that Costilla was actually located in Taos County, New Mexico Territory. It wasn't until October 21, 1872, that the village post office was officially renamed Costilla, New Mexico Territory.)	Costilla	see Costilla, New Mexico		
Costilla County		county	37.2777°N 105.4284°W	
Cotopaxi	Fremont	census-designated place	38.3769°N 105.6888°W	6,450 feet (1,966 m)
Cotsworth	Morgan	former post office		
Cotton Creek	Adams	Westminster neighborhood	39.8947°N 105.0436°W	5,322 feet (1,622 m)
Cotton Creek	Saguache	see Mirage		
Cottonwood	Douglas	unincorporated community	39.5625°N 104.8019°W	5,751 feet (1,753 m)
Cottonwood	Gilpin	unincorporated community	39.7633°N 105.4247°W	7,221 feet (2,201 m)
Cottonwood	Saguache	unincorporated community	37.9344°N 105.6442°W	8,425 feet (2,568 m)
Cottonwood Springs	Chaffee	former post office		
Coulter	Grand	former post office		
Country Acres	Douglas	unincorporated community	39.3881°N 104.6889°W	6,483 feet (1,976 m)
Country Club	Denver	Denver neighborhood		
Country Estates	Broomfield	Broomfield neighborhood	39.9447°N 105.0703°W	5,449 feet (1,661 m)
Country View Estates	Jefferson	Arvada neighborhood	39.8397°N 105.1303°W	5,636 feet (1,718 m)
Country West	Jefferson	unincorporated community	39.6189°N 105.1336°W	5,774 feet (1,760 m)
Countryside	Jefferson	Westminster neighborhood	39.8858°N 105.1194°W	5,495 feet (1,675 m)
Cousin Springs	Pueblo	former post office		
Coventry	Arapahoe	Littleton neighborhood	39.6047°N 105.0508°W	5,449 feet (1,661 m)
Coventry	Montrose	unincorporated community	38.1600°N 108.3748°W	6,677 feet (2,035 m)
Cowans	Lincoln	former post office		
Cow Camp	Summit	former statutory town		
Cowdrey	Jackson	unincorporated community	40.8597°N 106.3131°W	7,917 feet (2,413 m)
Cowdrey	Larimer	former post office		
Cox	Gunnison	former post office		
Cozy Corner	Adams	Westminster neighborhood	39.9139°N 105.0258°W	5,220 feet (1,591 m)
Cragmor	El Paso	Colorado Springs neighborhood		
Craig† (Note: On August 28, 1889, Yampa changed its name to Craig. Craig has been the seat of Moffat County, Colorado since the county was created on February 27, 1911.)	Moffat	home rule city	40.5152°N 107.5465°W	6,198 feet (1,889 m)
Craig Place	Moffat	unincorporated community	40.7202°N 108.9543°W	7,234 feet (2,205 m)
Craig South Highlands	Moffat	unincorporated community	40.4850°N 107.5631°W	6,394 feet (1,949 m)
Cramer	Fremont	former post office		
Crawford	Delta	statutory town	38.7039°N 107.6089°W	6,558 feet (1,999 m)
Creede	Mineral	statutory town	37.8492°N 106.9264°W	8,799 feet (2,682 m)
Creedmoor	Mineral	former post office		
Crescent	Grand	former post office		
Crescent	Jackson	former post office		
Crescent Village	Boulder	unincorporated community	39.9197°N 105.3611°W	8,018 feet (2,444 m)
Crest	Weld	former post office		
Crested Butte	Gunnison	home rule town	38.8697°N 106.9878°W	8,924 feet (2,720 m)
Crestmont Heights	Jefferson	Arvada neighborhood	39.8056°N 105.1328°W	5,476 feet (1,669 m)
Crestmoor	Denver	Denver neighborhood		
Crestone	Saguache	statutory town	37.9964°N 105.6997°W	7,930 feet (2,417 m)
Crestview	Douglas	unincorporated community	39.4864°N 104.7138°W	6,237 feet (1,901 m)
Crestview Villa	Jefferson	unincorporated community	39.7378°N 105.1811°W	5,810 feet (1,771 m)
Creswell	Jefferson	former post office		
Cripple City	Teller	see Gillett		
Cripple Creek† (Note: Fremont changed its name to Morland on December 9, 1891; then changed it back to Fremont on February 4, 1892; then changed it to Cripple Creek on June 20, 1892. Cripple Creek has been the seat of Teller County, Colorado since the county was created on March 23, 1899.)	Teller	statutory city	38.7467°N 105.1783°W	9,455 feet (2,882 m)
Crisman	Boulder	census-designated place	40.0416°N 105.3674°W	6,591 feet (2,009 m)
Cristonie	Costilla	former post office		
Critchell	Jefferson	former statutory town	39.4950°N 105.2067°W	
Crocker	Summit	former post office		
Crofton Park	Broomfield	Broomfield neighborhood	39.9231°N 105.0311°W	5,233 feet (1,595 m)
Crook	Logan	statutory town	40.8589°N 102.8010°W	3,707 feet (1,130 m)
Crookstown	Saguache	former post office		
Crooksville	Saguache	former post office		
Cross Creek	Arapahoe	Aurora neighborhood	39.7219°N 104.7086°W	5,584 feet (1,702 m)
Cross Mountain	Moffat	former post office		
Crosson	Jefferson	see Crossons		
Crossons	Jefferson	unincorporated community	39.3992°N 105.3864°W	7,162 feet (2,183 m)
Crow	Pueblo	former post office		
Crowley	Crowley	statutory town	38.1931°N 103.8561°W	4,354 feet (1,327 m)
Crowley County		county	38.3266°N 103.7848°W	
Crows Roost	El Paso	former post office		
Crystal	Gunnison	ghost town	39.0592°N 107.1012°W	8,950 feet (2,728 m)
Crystal	Montrose	former post office		
Crystal City	Gunnison	see Crystal, Gunnison County		
Crystal Lake	Jefferson	former post office		
Crystola	Teller	unincorporated community	38.9558°N 105.0272°W	7,979 feet (2,432 m)
Cuatro	Las Animas	former post office		
Cuchara	Huerfano	unincorporated community	37.3792°N 105.1003°W	8,468 feet (2,581 m)
Cuchara Camps	Huerfano	see Cuchara		
Cuchara Junction	Huerfano	unincorporated community	37.6670°N 104.6861°W	5,955 feet (1,815 m)
Cucharas	Huerfano	former post office		
Cuerin	Saguache	former post office		
Cuerna Verde Park	Pueblo	unincorporated community	37.9220°N 104.9714°W	7,582 feet (2,311 m)
Culp	Prowers	unincorporated community	38.1358°N 102.6094°W	3,655 feet (1,114 m)
Cumbres	Conejos	unincorporated community	37.0197°N 106.4478°W	10,010 feet (3,051 m)
Curran	Gunnison	former post office		
Currant	Fremont	former post office		
Currant Creek	Fremont	see Currant		
Curtin	Summit	former statutory town		
Curtis	El Paso	former post office		
Curtis	Washington	former post office		
Curtis Park	Denver	Denver neighborhood		
Custer County		county	38.1087°N 105.3674°W	
Cyanide	Fremont	former post office		

== D ==
Select the OpenStreetMap link at the right to view the location of places in this section.

Place	County	Type	Location	Elevation
Dacono	Weld	home rule city	40.0847°N 104.9394°W	5,023 feet (1,531 m)
Daffodil	Douglas	see Deckers		
Dailey	Garfield	former post office		
Dailey	Logan	unincorporated community	40.6567°N 102.7238°W	4,144 feet (1,263 m)
Dakan	Douglas	ghost town		
Dake	Park	former post office		
Dakota Ridge	Jefferson	census-designated place	39.6192°N 105.1343°W	5,768 feet (1,758 m)
Dalerose	Las Animas	former post office		
Dallas	Ouray	ghost town	38.1833°N 107.7448°W	6,923 feet (2,110 m)
Dallas City	Ouray	see Dallas		
Dallas Divide	Ouray	former post office		
Dallasville	Ouray	former post office		
Damascus	Lincoln	former post office		
Daniels	Jefferson	former post office		
Daniels Garden	Jefferson	Lakewood neighborhood	39.7353°N 105.1328°W	5,610 feet (1,710 m)
Davidson	Boulder	former post office		
Davies	Pitkin	former post office		
Davis	Las Animas	former post office		
Dawkins	Pueblo	former post office		
Dawson	Jefferson	see Foxton		
Dayton	Boulder	see Nederland		
Dayton	Gunnison	former post office		
Dayton	Kiowa	former post office		
Dayton‡ (Note: Dayton served as the seat of Lake County, Colorado Territory from 1866 until 1868.)	Lake	ghost town		
De Beque	Mesa	statutory town	39.3344°N 108.2151°W	4,954 feet (1,510 m)
De Nova	Washington	ghost town	39.8589°N 102.9733°W	4,505 feet (1,373 m)
Dean	Las Animas	former post office		
Deane	Jefferson	see Strontia Springs		
Deansbury	Jefferson	see Strontia Springs		
Dearfield	Weld	ghost town	40.2905°N 104.2594°W	4,498 feet (1,371 m)
Debeque	Mesa	see De Beque		
Debs	Hinsdale	ghost town		
Decatur	Baca	former post office		
Decatur	Summit	former statutory town	39.6025°N 105.8188°W	
Deckers	Douglas	unincorporated community	39.2547°N 105.2269°W	6,398 feet (1,950 m)
Deep Channel	Moffat	former post office		
Deepcreek	Routt	former post office		
Deer Trail	Arapahoe	statutory town	39.6150°N 104.0444°W	5,190 feet (1,582 m)
Deer Valley	Park	former post office		
Deercreek	Jefferson	former post office		
Deermont	Jefferson	unincorporated community	39.5075°N 105.1844°W	6,972 feet (2,125 m)
Deertrail	Arapahoe	see Deer Trail		
Defiance	Garfield	see Glenwood Springs		
Del Mar	Arapahoe	Aurora neighborhood	39.7289°N 104.8575°W	5,410 feet (1,649 m)
Del Mine	San Juan	former post office		
Del Norte† (Note: On February 10, 1874, the Territory of Colorado created Rio Grande County, Colorado Territory with Del Norte as the original county seat, until statehood on August 1, 1876, when Del Norte became the seat of Rio Grande County, Colorado.)	Rio Grande	statutory town	37.6789°N 106.3534°W	7,884 feet (2,403 m)
Del Rio	Conejos	former post office		
Delagua	Las Animas	ghost town	37.3400°N 104.6630°W	6,686 feet (2,038 m)
Delaware City	Summit	see Braddoks		
Delaware Flats	Summit	former statutory town	39.5267°N 106.0259°W	
Delcarbon	Huerfano	ghost town	37.7125°N 104.8769°W	6,342 feet (1,933 m)
Delhi	Las Animas	unincorporated community	37.6422°N 104.0180°W	5,085 feet (1,550 m)
Delphi	Boulder	see Wallstreet		
Delta† (Note: Delta has been the seat of Delta County, Colorado since the county was created on February 11, 1883.)	Delta	home rule city	38.7422°N 108.0690°W	4,961 feet (1,512 m)
Delta County		county	38.8614°N 107.8632°W	
Denver # (Note: Denver City served as the first capital of the Provisional Government of the Territory of Jefferson from August 24, 1859, until November 13, 1860. On December 3, 1859, the Jefferson Territory granted a charter to the consolidated City of Denver, Auraria, and Highland, still popularly known as Denver City. Denver City served as the first capital of the new Territory of Colorado from February 28, 1861 to July 7, 1862, and served as the first seat of Arapahoe County from November 1, 1861, until November 15, 1902. The Colorado Territory reincorporated the city as the City of Denver City on November 7, 1861. On February 13, 1866, the city shortened its name to the City of Denver. Denver served again as the capital of the Colorado Territory from December 9, 1867, until statehood on August 1, 1876, when Denver became the (first and only) capital of the State of Colorado. The City and County of Denver was consolidated on November 15, 1902.)		consolidated city and county	39.7392°N 104.9849°W	5,280 feet (1,609 m)
Denver, Auraria, and Highland ⁂	Denver	see Denver		
Denver City ⁂	Denver	see Denver		
Denver Civic Center	Denver	Denver neighborhood		
Denver Junction (Note: On May 26, 1886, Denver Junction changed its name to Julesburg. Julesburg has been the seat of Sedgwick County, Colorado since the county was created on April 9, 1889.)	Sedgwick	see Julesburg		
Denver Medical Depot	Denver	former U.S. Army supply depot	39.7708°N 104.9597°W	5,206 feet (1,587 m)
Denver Mills	Denver	former post office		
Deora	Baca	unincorporated community	37.5803°N 102.9666°W	4,672 feet (1,424 m)
Derblay	Adams	see Commerce City		
Derby	Adams	census-designated place	39.8394°N 104.9186°W	5,128 feet (1,563 m)
Derby	Eagle	former post office		
Derby Junction	Eagle	unincorporated community	39.8689°N 106.9056°W	6,483 feet (1,976 m)
Deuel	Morgan	see Weldona		
Deur	Prowers	former post office		
Devine	Park	see Black Mountain		
Devine	Pueblo	unincorporated community	38.2750°N 104.4575°W	4,583 feet (1,397 m)
Devonsire Heights	Arapahoe	unincorporated community	39.6489°N 104.9486°W	5,456 feet (1,663 m)
Dexter	Grand	former post office		
Dick	Weld	ghost town	40.0314°N 104.9372°W	5,128 feet (1,563 m)
Dickey	Summit	former statutory town	39.5729°N 106.0529°W	
Dicks	Las Animas	former post office		
Dickson	Huerfano	see Bradford		
Dillingham	Washington	see De Nova		
Dillon	Summit	home rule town	39.6303°N 106.0434°W	9,111 feet (2,777 m)
Dinan	San Miguel	former post office		
Dinosaur	Moffat	statutory town	40.2436°N 109.0146°W	5,922 feet (1,805 m)
Disappointment	Dolores	see Willow Gulch		
Diston	Kiowa	former post office		
Divide	Chaffee	see Newett		
Divide	Teller	census-designated place	38.9450°N 105.1619°W	9,117 feet (2,779 m)
Dix	La Plata	former post office		
Dodgeville	Kit Carson	former post office		
Dodsonville	Las Animas	see Linwood		
Dodsville	Lake	former post office		
Doenz Place	Summit	unincorporated community	39.9050°N 106.4017°W	9,012 feet (2,747 m)
Dolomite	Chaffee	see Newett		
Dolores	Montezuma	statutory town	37.4739°N 108.5045°W	6,936 feet (2,114 m)
Dolores County		county	37.7520°N 108.5173°W	
Dome Rock	Jefferson	unincorporated community	39.4217°N 105.1975°W	6,283 feet (1,915 m)
Dominguez	Delta	unincorporated community	38.7972°N 108.3223°W	4,783 feet (1,458 m)
Dominion	Boulder	Longmont neighborhood	40.1430°N 105.1269°W	5,000 feet (1,524 m)
Dora	Chaffee	former post office		
Dora	Custer	see Gove		
Doran	Park	see Horseshoe		
Dotsero	Eagle	census-designated place	39.6461°N 107.0652°W	6,145 feet (1,873 m)
Doubleheader Ranch	Jefferson	unincorporated community	39.5589°N 105.2461°W	8,012 feet (2,442 m)
Douglas	Douglas	former statutory town	39.3446°N 104.8649°W	
Douglas County		county	39.3296°N 104.9297°W	
Dove Creek† (Note: Dove Creek has served as the seat of Dolores County, Colorado since 1945.)	Dolores	statutory town	37.7661°N 108.9059°W	6,844 feet (2,086 m)
Dove Hill	Arapahoe	unincorporated community	39.6206°N 104.7119°W	5,935 feet (1,809 m)
Dove Valley	Arapahoe	census-designated place	39.5777°N 104.8294°W	5,735 feet (1,748 m)
Dover	Weld	unincorporated community	40.7794°N 104.8125°W	5,413 feet (1,650 m)
Dowds Junction	Eagle	unincorporated community	39.6083°N 106.4478°W	7,720 feet (2,353 m)
Downer	Boulder	former post office		
Downieville	Clear Creek	unincorporated community	39.7667°N 105.6144°W	8,031 feet (2,448 m)
Downieville-Lawson-Dumont CDP	Clear Creek	census-designated place	39.7662°N 105.6126°W	8,009 feet (2,441 m)
Downing	Las Animas	former post office		
Downtown Arvada	Jefferson	see Olde Town Arvada		
Downtown Denver	Denver	Denver neighborhood		
Doyleville	Gunnison	unincorporated community	38.4517°N 106.6095°W	8,054 feet (2,455 m)
Dragoo	El Paso	former post office		
Drake	Gunnison	former post office		
Drake	Larimer	unincorporated community	40.4319°N 105.3403°W	6,161 feet (1,878 m)
Drennan	El Paso	former post office		
Drew	Gunnison	former post office		
Driscoll	Fremont	former post office		
Druce	Las Animas	former post office		
Dry Diggings	San Miguel	former post office		
Dryer	Jackson	former post office		
Drygulch	Routt	former post office		
Dublin Bay	Morgan	former post office		
Dubois	Gunnison	former post office		
Dudley	Park	ghost town	39.2969°N 106.0717°W	10,502 feet (3,201 m)
Duer	Prowers	former post office		
Duff	Adams	former post office		
Duffield	El Paso	unincorporated community	38.7422°N 104.9125°W	9,281 feet (2,829 m)
Duke	Pueblo	former post office		
Dumont	Clear Creek	unincorporated community	39.7647°N 105.6003°W	7,933 feet (2,418 m)
Duncan	Las Animas	see Lone Oak		
Duncan	Saguache	ghost town	37.8742°N 105.6145°W	8,107 feet (2,471 m)
Dunckley	Routt	ghost town	40.3008°N 107.1942°W	7,605 feet (2,318 m)
Dune	Saguache	former post office		
Dunkley	Routt	see Dunckley		
Dunton	Dolores	unincorporated community	37.7728°N 108.0940°W	8,855 feet (2,699 m)
Dupont	Adams	unincorporated community	39.8380°N 104.9119°W	5,144 feet (1,568 m)
Durango† (Note: Durango has served as the seat of La Plata County, Colorado since 1881.)	La Plata	home rule city	37.2753°N 107.8801°W	6,532 feet (1,991 m)
Durham	Mesa	unincorporated community	39.0878°N 108.5990°W	4,554 feet (1,388 m)
Dyersville	Summit	ghost town	39.4205°N 105.9839°W	10,879 feet (3,316 m)
Dyke	Archuleta	unincorporated community	37.2264°N 107.1953°W	6,808 feet (2,075 m)

== E ==
Select the OpenStreetMap link at the right to view the location of places in this section.

Place	County	Type	Location	Elevation
Eads† (Note: Eads has served as the seat of Kiowa County, Colorado since 1902.)	Kiowa	statutory town	38.4806°N 102.7819°W	4,219 feet (1,286 m)
Eagalite	Mesa	see Plateau City		
Eagle†	Eagle	statutory town	39.6553°N 106.8287°W	6,601 feet (2,012 m)
Eagle (1880)	Eagle	former post office		
Eagle County		county	39.6277°N 106.6951°W	
Eagle Rock	Boulder	former post office		
Eagles Nest	Eagle	unincorporated community	39.6183°N 106.3861°W	10,328 feet (3,148 m)
Earl	Las Animas	unincorporated community	37.3333°N 104.2783°W	5,686 feet (1,733 m)
Early Spring	Garfield	former post office		
East Alamosa	Alamosa	see Alamosa East		
East Argentine	Clear Creek	former post office		
East Canon	Fremont	see East Cañon		
East Cañon	Fremont	Cañon City neighborhood	38.4528°N 105.2130°W	5,344 feet (1,629 m)
East Colfax	Denver	Denver neighborhood		
East Highlands	Denver	Denver neighborhood		
East La Salle	Weld	unincorporated community	40.3547°N 104.6825°W	4,669 feet (1,423 m)
East Pleasant View	Jefferson	census-designated place	39.7277°N 105.1572°W	5,837 feet (1,779 m)
East Portal	Gilpin	unincorporated community	39.9033°N 105.6444°W	9,242 feet (2,817 m)
East Quincy Highlands	Arapahoe	Aurora neighborhood	39.6447°N 104.7311°W	5,814 feet (1,772 m)
East Tincup	Jefferson	former post office		
East Vancorum	Montrose	unincorporated community	38.2278°N 108.5951°W	5,407 feet (1,648 m)
Eastdale	Costilla	ghost town	37.0286°N 105.6508°W	7,533 feet (2,296 m)
Eastlake	Adams	unincorporated community	39.9239°N 104.9614°W	5,269 feet (1,606 m)
Easton	El Paso	see Eastonville		
Eastonville	El Paso	ghost town	39.0611°N 104.5622°W	7,234 feet (2,205 m)
Eastridge	Arapahoe	Aurora neighborhood	39.6711°N 104.8567°W	5,630 feet (1,716 m)
Eaton	Weld	statutory town	40.5303°N 104.7114°W	4,839 feet (1,475 m)
Eatonton	Weld	see Eaton		
Echo Hills	Clear Creek	census-designated place	39.6724°N 105.4155°W	9,321 feet (2,841 m)
Echo House	Montezuma	Puebloan dwellings	37.1678°N 108.5001°W	6,686 feet (2,038 m)
Eckert	Delta	unincorporated community	38.8428°N 107.9628°W	5,568 feet (1,697 m)
Eckley	Yuma	statutory town	40.1139°N 102.4908°W	3,894 feet (1,187 m)
Eddy	Routt	former post office		
Eden	Pueblo	unincorporated community	38.3164°N 104.6164°W	4,843 feet (1,476 m)
Edenview	Las Animas	former post office		
Edgemont	Jefferson	Lakewood neighborhood	39.7311°N 105.1308°W	5,627 feet (1,715 m)
Edgerton	El Paso	ghost town		
Edgewater	Jefferson	home rule city	39.7530°N 105.0642°W	5,381 feet (1,640 m)
Edith	Archuleta	unincorporated community	37.0056°N 106.9103°W	7,080 feet (2,158 m)
Edith	Routt	former post office		
Edler	Baca	unincorporated community	37.1764°N 102.7783°W	4,652 feet (1,418 m)
Edlowe	Teller	former post office		
Edwards	Eagle	census-designated place	39.6450°N 106.5942°W	7,221 feet (2,201 m)
Edwest	Las Animas	former post office		
Egeria	Routt	former post office		
Eggers	Larimer	unincorporated community	40.6908°N 105.4875°W	6,821 feet (2,079 m)
Egnar	San Miguel	unincorporated community	37.9164°N 108.9401°W	7,329 feet (2,234 m)
El Cuervo	Custer	see Fort Le Duc		
El Dora	Boulder	see Eldora		
El Dorado	Boulder	see Eldora		
El Jebel	Eagle	census-designated place	39.3950°N 107.0903°W	6,483 feet (1,976 m)
El Moro	Las Animas	census-designated place	37.2350°N 104.4491°W	5,879 feet (1,792 m)
El Paso	El Paso	see Fountain		
El Paso County		county	38.8320°N 104.5254°W	
El Pueblo	Pueblo	historic trading post		
El Rancho	Jefferson	unincorporated community	39.6986°N 105.3336°W	7,762 feet (2,366 m)
El Vado	Boulder	unincorporated community	40.0058°N 105.3464°W	6,024 feet (1,836 m)
Elba	Washington	unincorporated community	39.9483°N 103.2183°W	4,705 feet (1,434 m)
Elbert	Elbert	census-designated place	39.2189°N 104.5404°W	6,841 feet (2,085 m)
Elbert County		county	39.2864°N 104.1355°W	
Elco	La Plata	former post office		
Eldora	Boulder	census-designated place	39.9486°N 105.5639°W	8,642 feet (2,634 m)
Eldorado	Boulder	see Eldora		
Eldorado Estates	Jefferson	unincorporated community	39.8386°N 105.1867°W	5,748 feet (1,752 m)
Eldorado Springs	Boulder	census-designated place	39.9325°N 105.2769°W	5,745 feet (1,751 m)
Eldred	Fremont	former post office		
Eldredge	Ouray	unincorporated community	38.2878°N 107.7673°W	6,539 feet (1,993 m)
Elephant	Clear Creek	former post office		
Elephant Park	Jefferson	unincorporated community	39.6289°N 105.3628°W	7,585 feet (2,312 m)
Elgin	Gunnison	see Waunita Hot Springs		
Elizabeth	Elbert	statutory town	39.3603°N 104.5969°W	6,476 feet (1,974 m)
Elk Creek	Jefferson	former post office		
Elk Horn	Larimer	former post office		
Elk Springs	Moffat	unincorporated community	40.3555°N 108.4484°W	6,378 feet (1,944 m)
Elkdale	Grand	unincorporated community	40.0403°N 105.8811°W	8,153 feet (2,485 m)
Elkhead	Routt	unincorporated community	40.6486°N 107.2076°W	7,487 feet (2,282 m)
Elkhead (1884)	Routt	ghost town		
Elkhead (1927)	Routt	former post office		
Elko	Gunnison	former post office		
Elkton	Gunnison	ghost town	38.9636°N 107.0334°W	10,453 feet (3,186 m)
Ella	Prowers	former post office		
Ellicott	El Paso	census-designated place	38.8256°N 104.3829°W	5,974 feet (1,821 m)
Elmoro	Las Animas	see El Moro		
Elphis	Kit Carson	former post office		
Elsmere	El Paso	unincorporated community	38.8647°N 104.7105°W	6,424 feet (1,958 m)
Elwell	Weld	unincorporated community	40.3361°N 104.9419°W	4,944 feet (1,507 m)
Elyria	Denver	former statutory town	39.7838°N 104.9635°W	
Elyria-Swansea	Denver	Denver neighborhood		
Embargo	Saguache	former post office		
Emerson	Phillips	former post office		
Emery	La Plata	former post office		
Emma	Gunnison	former post office		
Empire	Clear Creek	statutory town	39.7614°N 105.6844°W	8,615 feet (2,626 m)
Empire City	Clear Creek	see Empire		
Engle	Las Animas	former post office		
Engleburg	Las Animas	former post office		
Engleville	Las Animas	unincorporated community	37.1495°N 104.4753°W	6,503 feet (1,982 m)
Englewood	Arapahoe	home rule city	39.6478°N 104.9878°W	5,371 feet (1,637 m)
Eno	Adams	Commerce City neighborhood	39.8872°N 104.8441°W	5,121 feet (1,561 m)
Enterprise	Jefferson	see Waterton		
Ephraim	Conejos	see Sanford		
Erie	Boulder	statutory town	40.0503°N 105.0500°W	5,026 feet (1,532 m)
Erie	Weld	statutory town	40.0503°N 105.0500°W	5,026 feet (1,532 m)
Escalante	Delta	unincorporated community	38.7578°N 108.2617°W	4,833 feet (1,473 m)
Escalante	Mesa	former post office		
Escalante	Moffat	former post office		
Escalante Forks	Mesa	former post office		
Eskdale	Adams	former post office		
Espinosa	Conejos	unincorporated community	37.1306°N 105.9461°W	7,746 feet (2,361 m)
Espinoza	Conejos	former post office		
Estabrook	Park	unincorporated community	39.3830°N 105.4294°W	7,562 feet (2,305 m)
Estelene	Baca	former post office		
Estes Park	Larimer	statutory town	40.3772°N 105.5217°W	7,530 feet (2,295 m)
Estrella	Alamosa	unincorporated community	37.3661°N 105.9245°W	7,569 feet (2,307 m)
Eula	Routt	former post office		
Eureka	San Juan	ghost town	37.8797°N 107.5651°W	9,862 feet (3,006 m)
Eva	Montrose	former post office		
Evans‡ (Note: Evans served as the seat of Weld County, Colorado Territory from 1870 until 1874 and again from 1875 until statehood on August 1, 1876, when it became the seat of Weld County, Colorado until the following year.)	Weld	home rule city	40.3764°N 104.6922°W	4,652 feet (1,418 m)
Evanston	Weld	unincorporated community	40.1069°N 104.9386°W	4,964 feet (1,513 m)
Evansville	Rio Grande	unincorporated community	37.6711°N 106.3189°W	7,848 feet (2,392 m)
Everett	Lake	unincorporated community	39.0678°N 106.5020°W	10,118 feet (3,084 m)
Evergreen	Jefferson	census-designated place	39.6333°N 105.3172°W	7,073 feet (2,156 m)
Eversman	Boulder	former post office		
Excelsior	Mesa	former post office		
Excelsior	Pueblo	former post office		
Excelsior	Summit	former statutory town	39.5619°N 106.1288°W	
Exchequer	Saguache	former post office		

== F ==
Select the OpenStreetMap link at the right to view the location of places in this section.

Place	County	Type	Location	Elevation
Fair Play (Note: On November 7, 1867, county voters selected Fair Play as the new seat of Park County, Colorado Territory, and since statehood on August 1, 1876, the seat of Park County, Colorado. On October 1, 1924, Fair Play changed its name to Fairplay, and has continued to serve as county seat.)	Park	see Fairplay		
Fairfax	Grand	former post office		
Fairmount	Jefferson	census-designated place	39.7931°N 105.1712°W	5,591 feet (1,704 m)
Fairmount	Otero	see Swink		
Fairplay†	Park	statutory town	39.2247°N 106.0020°W	9,954 feet (3,034 m)
Fairview	Adams	unincorporated community	39.8383°N 105.0183°W	5,358 feet (1,633 m)
Fairview	Custer	unincorporated community	38.0678°N 105.0992°W	8,684 feet (2,647 m)
Fairview	Teller	unincorporated community	38.7439°N 105.1583°W	10,138 feet (3,090 m)
Fairville	Park	see Shawnee		
Fairy	Fremont	former post office		
Falcon	El Paso	unincorporated community	38.9330°N 104.6086°W	6,831 feet (2,082 m)
Falfa	La Plata	unincorporated community	37.2131°N 107.7909°W	6,906 feet (2,105 m)
Fall Creek	San Miguel	former post office		
Fall River	Clear Creek	see Spanish Bar		
Far Horizon	Jefferson	Arvada neighborhood	39.8497°N 105.0572°W	5,404 feet (1,647 m)
Farisita	Huerfano	unincorporated community	37.7447°N 105.0714°W	6,650 feet (2,027 m)
Farista	Huerfano	see Northlands		
Farley	Kit Carson	former post office		
Farnham	Summit	former statutory town	39.4249°N 105.9823°W	11,320 feet (3,450 m)
Farr	Huerfano	former post office		
Farwell	Pitkin	former post office		
Farwell	Rio Blanco	former post office		
Fayette	Otero	unincorporated community	38.0728°N 103.7694°W	4,229 feet (1,289 m)
Fearnowville	Pueblo	unincorporated community	38.2792°N 104.5603°W	4,688 feet (1,429 m)
Feathers Ranch	Chaffee	former post office		
Federal Heights	Adams	home rule city	39.8514°N 104.9986°W	5,302 feet (1,616 m)
Fenders	Jefferson	unincorporated community	39.5739°N 105.2169°W	7,044 feet (2,147 m)
Ferberite	Boulder	former post office		
Fergus	Kiowa	former post office		
Ferguson	Garfield	former post office		
Ferncliff	Boulder	unincorporated community	40.1908°N 105.5131°W	8,205 feet (2,501 m)
Ferndale	Jefferson	unincorporated community	39.4061°N 105.2555°W	6,581 feet (2,006 m)
Fidler	Fremont	former post office		
Findale	Larimer	former post office		
Finntown	Lake	see Adelaide, Lake County		
Firestone	Weld	statutory town	40.1125°N 104.9366°W	4,970 feet (1,515 m)
Firstview	Cheyenne	unincorporated community	38.8158°N 102.5396°W	4,577 feet (1,395 m)
Fisher	Chaffee	former post office		
Fisher	Mineral	see Spar City		
Fisher	Pueblo	former post office		
Fitzsimons	Adams	former post office		
Fitzsimons Army Medical Center	Adams	historic U.S. Army hospital		
Five Points	Denver	Denver neighborhood	39.7547°N 104.9781°W	5,226 feet (1,593 m)
Flagler	Kit Carson	statutory town	39.2930°N 103.0672°W	4,941 feet (1,506 m)
Flat Top	Washington	former post office		
Fleming	Logan	statutory town	40.6800°N 102.8394°W	4,242 feet (1,293 m)
Flemming's Ranch	Weld	former post office		
Fletcher	Adams	see Aurora		
Flora	Sedgwick	former post office		
Florence	Fremont	statutory city	38.3903°N 105.1186°W	5,180 feet (1,579 m)
Floresta	Gunnison	ghost town	38.8419°N 107.1228°W	9,879 feet (3,011 m)
Florida	La Plata	unincorporated community	37.2150°N 107.7526°W	6,729 feet (2,051 m)
Florissant	Teller	census-designated place	38.9446°N 105.2899°W	8,192 feet (2,497 m)
Floyd Hill	Clear Creek	census-designated place	39.7217°N 105.4313°W	9,094 feet (2,772 m)
Flues	Las Animas	former post office		
Focus	Custer	former post office		
Folsom	San Miguel	former post office		
Fondis	Elbert	ghost town	39.2158°N 104.3472°W	6,175 feet (1,882 m)
Foothills	Pueblo	former post office		
Forbes	Las Animas	ghost town	37.2600°N 104.5647°W	6,506 feet (1,983 m)
Forbes Junction	Las Animas	former post office		
Ford	Fremont	see Texas Creek		
Ford	Logan	unincorporated community	40.7167°N 103.1352°W	3,875 feet (1,181 m)
Ford	Yuma	former post office		
Forder	Lincoln	unincorporated community	38.6808°N 103.7058°W	4,925 feet (1,501 m)
Forest City	Chaffee	see Saint Elmo		
Forestdale	Custer	former post office		
Forks	Larimer	former post office		
Forks Creek	Jefferson	see Forkscreek		
Forkscreek	Jefferson	former post office		
Formby	Montezuma	former post office		
Fort Big Spring	Cheyenne	unincorporated community	38.9333°N 102.8296°W	4,485 feet (1,367 m)
Fort Boettcher	Jackson	unincorporated community	40.8044°N 106.5439°W	8,327 feet (2,538 m)
Fort Breckenridge	Summit	see Fort Mary B		
Fort Carson	El Paso	United States Army post	38.7375°N 104.7889°W	5,840 feet (1,780 m)
Fort Carson CDP	El Paso	census-designated place	38.7095°N 104.7720°W	5,752 feet (1,753 m)
Fort Cass	Pueblo	historic trading post		
Fort Collins (1862)	Larimer	historic U.S. Army fort		
Fort Collins (1864)	Larimer	historic U.S. Army fort		
Fort Collins† (Note: In 1868, county voters selected Fort Collins as the new seat of Larimer County, Colorado Territory, and since statehood on August 1, 1876, the seat of Larimer County, Colorado.)	Larimer	home rule city	40.5853°N 105.0844°W	5,003 feet (1,525 m)
Fort Convenience	Adams	historic trading post		
Fort Crawford	Montrose	historic U.S. Army post		
Fort Davy Crockett	Moffat	historic trading post		
Fort El Puebla	Otero	see Milk Fort		
Fort Fauntleroy	Bent	see Fort Lyon (1860–1867)		
Fort Fisher	Pueblo	see El Pueblo		
Fort Flagler	La Plata	historic civilian stockade		
Fort Fraeb	Routt	see Fraeb's Post		
Fort Francisco	Huerfano	see Francisco Fort		
Fort Gantt	Bent	see Gantt's Picket Post		
Fort Garland (1858)	Costilla	historic U.S. Army fort		
Fort Garland	Costilla	census-designated place	37.4289°N 105.4339°W	7,943 feet (2,421 m)
Fort George	Weld	see Fort Saint Vrain		
Fort Gerry	Weld	historic trading post		
Fort Huerfano	Pueblo	historic encampment		
Fort Independence	Otero	see Milk Fort		
Fort Independence	Summit	see Fort Mary B		
Fort Independent	Summit	see Fort Mary B		
Fort Jackson	Weld	historic trading post		
Fort Juana	Pueblo	see El Pueblo		
Fort Julesburg	Sedgwick	historic trading post	40.9430°N 102.3582°W	3,514 feet (1,071 m)
Fort Junction	Weld	former post office		
Fort Lawrence	Weld	see Fort Lupton (1836)		
Fort Le Duc	Custer	historic trading post		
Fort Leche	Otero	see Milk Fort		
Fort Lewis (1878–1880)	Archuleta	historic U.S. Army post		
Fort Lewis (1880–1891)	La Plata	historic U.S. Army post		
Fort Logan (1889)	Denver	historic U.S. Army post		
Fort Logan	Denver	Denver neighborhood		
Fort Lookout	Weld	see Fort Saint Vrain		
Fort Lupton (1836)	Weld	historic trading post		
Fort Lupton	Weld	statutory city	40.0847°N 104.8130°W	4,905 feet (1,495 m)
Fort Lyon (1860)	Bent	historic U.S. Army fort		
Fort Lyon (1867)	Bent	historic U.S. Army fort		
Fort Lyon	Bent	unincorporated community	38.0922°N 103.1522°W	3,888 feet (1,185 m)
Fort Mary B	Summit	historic civilian stockade		
Fort Mary Bigelow	Summit	see Fort Mary B		
Fort Massachusetts	Costilla	historic U.S. Army fort		
Fort Maurice	Custer	see Fort Le Duc		
Fort Meeker	Rio Blanco	historic U.S. Army fort		
Fort Meribeh	Summit	see Fort Mary B		
Fort Misery	Moffat	see Fort Davy Crockett		
Fort Moore	Logan	former post office		
Fort Morgan (1864)	Morgan	historic U.S. Army post		
Fort Morgan† (Note: Fort Morgan has been the seat of Morgan County, Colorado since the county was created on February 19, 1889.)	Morgan	home rule city	40.2503°N 103.8000°W	4,327 feet (1,319 m)
Fort Namaqua	Larimer	historic trading post		
Fort Nepesta	Pueblo	see El Pueblo		
Fort Pueblo	Pueblo	see El Pueblo		
Fort Ranking	Sedgwick	see Fort Sedgwick		
Fort Reynolds	Pueblo	historic U.S. Army fort	38.2306°N 104.3033°W	4,534 feet (1,382 m)
Fort Robidoux	Delta	see Fort Uncompahgre		
Fort Saint Vrain	Weld	historic trading post	40.2789°N 104.8550°W	4,764 feet (1,452 m)
Fort Sangre de Cristo	Costilla	see Spanish Fort		
Fort Sedgwick	Sedgwick	historic U.S. Army fort	40.9430°N 102.3805°W	3,543 feet (1,080 m)
Fort Sheridan	Denver	see Fort Logan (1889)		
Fort Spaulding	Pueblo	see El Pueblo		
Fort Talpa	Huerfano	historic civilian fort		
Fort Uncompahgre	Delta	historic trading post		
Fort Vasquez	Weld	historic trading post		
Fort Weld	Denver	historic U.S. Army fort		
Fort Wicked	Logan	historic ranch and stage station		
Fort William	Otero	see Bent's Old Fort		
Fort Wise	Bent	see Fort Lyon (1860)		
Fortification	Routt	former post office		
Fosston	Weld	unincorporated community	40.5686°N 104.3600°W	4,783 feet (1,458 m)
Founders Village	Douglas	Castle Rock neighborhood	39.3758°N 104.8086°W	6,545 feet (1,995 m)
Fountain	El Paso	home rule city	38.6822°N 104.7008°W	5,545 feet (1,690 m)
Fountain Side	Arapahoe	unincorporated community	39.6875°N 104.8594°W	5,518 feet (1,682 m)
Four Corners Crossing	Bent	unincorporated community	38.0267°N 102.7780°W	3,855 feet (1,175 m)
Four Square Mile	Arapahoe	census-designated place	39.6807°N 104.8879°W	5,440 feet (1,658 m)
Fouret	Las Animas	former post office		
Fourmile	Moffat	former post office		
Fowler	Otero	statutory town	38.1292°N 104.0233°W	4,341 feet (1,323 m)
Fox	Yuma	former post office		
Fox Creek	Conejos	unincorporated community	37.0656°N 106.2014°W	8,356 feet (2,547 m)
Foxfield	Arapahoe	statutory town	39.5917°N 104.7925°W	5,755 feet (1,754 m)
Foxton	Jefferson	unincorporated community	39.4244°N 105.2361°W	6,457 feet (1,968 m)
Fraeb's Post	Routt	historic trading post		
Frances	Boulder	former post office		
Franceville	El Paso	ghost town		
Franceville Junction	El Paso	former post office		
Francisco Fort	Huerfano	historic civilian fort		
Frankstown‡	Douglas	ghost town		
Franktown‡	Douglas	census-designated place	39.3914°N 104.7528°W	6,155 feet (1,876 m)
Fraser	Grand	statutory town	39.9450°N 105.8172°W	8,579 feet (2,615 m)
Frawley	Summit	former post office		
Frederick	Weld	statutory town	40.0992°N 104.9372°W	4,980 feet (1,518 m)
Fredonia	Bent	former post office		
Free America	Clear Creek	former post office		
Free Gold	Chaffee	former post office		
Freedom	Conejos	see Morgan		
Freeland	Clear Creek	unincorporated community	39.7442°N 105.5956°W	9,209 feet (2,807 m)
Fremont	Morgan	former post office		
Fremont	Teller	see Cripple Creek		
Fremont	Washington	former post office		
Fremont County		county	38.4732°N 105.4394°W	
Frick	Baca	unincorporated community	37.5853°N 102.9555°W	4,747 feet (1,447 m)
Friend	Yuma	former post office		
Friendly Village	Adams	Aurora neighborhood	39.7439°N 104.7886°W	5,413 feet (1,650 m)
Frisco	Summit	home rule town	39.5744°N 106.0975°W	9,075 feet (2,766 m)
Frost	Adams	former post office		
Frost	Montrose	unincorporated community	38.5672°N 107.9701°W	5,453 feet (1,662 m)
Frosts Ranch	Douglas	see Rock Ridge		
Fruita	Mesa	home rule city	39.1589°N 108.7290°W	4,511 feet (1,375 m)
Fruitvale	Mesa	census-designated place	39.0816°N 108.4968°W	4,662 feet (1,421 m)
Fulford	Eagle	census-designated place	39.5166°N 106.6575°W	9,813 feet (2,991 m)
Fulton	Adams	former post office		
Funston	Garfield	unincorporated community	39.5605°N 107.3492°W	5,725 feet (1,745 m)
Futurity	Chaffee	unincorporated community	38.7364°N 105.9539°W	9,764 feet (2,976 m)

== G–O ==
- List of populated places in Colorado: G through O

== P–Z ==
- List of populated places in Colorado: P through Z

Colorado populated places: A B C D E F G H I J K L M N O P Q R S T U V W X Y Z

== See also ==
- Bibliography of Colorado
- Geography of Colorado
- History of Colorado
- Index of Colorado-related articles
- List of Colorado-related lists
  - List of adjectivals and demonyms for Colorado cities
  - List of census-designated places in Colorado
  - List of counties in Colorado
  - List of county seats in Colorado
  - List of forts in Colorado
  - List of ghost towns in Colorado
  - List of municipalities in Colorado
  - List of post offices in Colorado
- Outline of Colorado
