= Bovina =

Bovina may refer to:

- Bovina, Colorado
- Bovina, Mississippi
- Bovina, New York
- Bovina, Texas
- Bovina, Wisconsin

in science:

- Bovina (subtribe), a group of hoofed mammals containing bison and cattle
