= Fort Crawford (disambiguation) =

Fort Crawford may refer to:

== United States ==
- Fort Crawford, a 19th-century military outpost of the United States Army located in Prairie du Chien, Wisconsin.
- Fort Crawford (Alabama), provided defense for Alabama settlers in what is today East Brewton, Alabama
- Fort Crawford (Colorado), a 19th-century military post that was located in Montrose County, Colorado
