= Alma Junction, Colorado =

Ghost town in Park County, Colorado, United States

- Ghost town
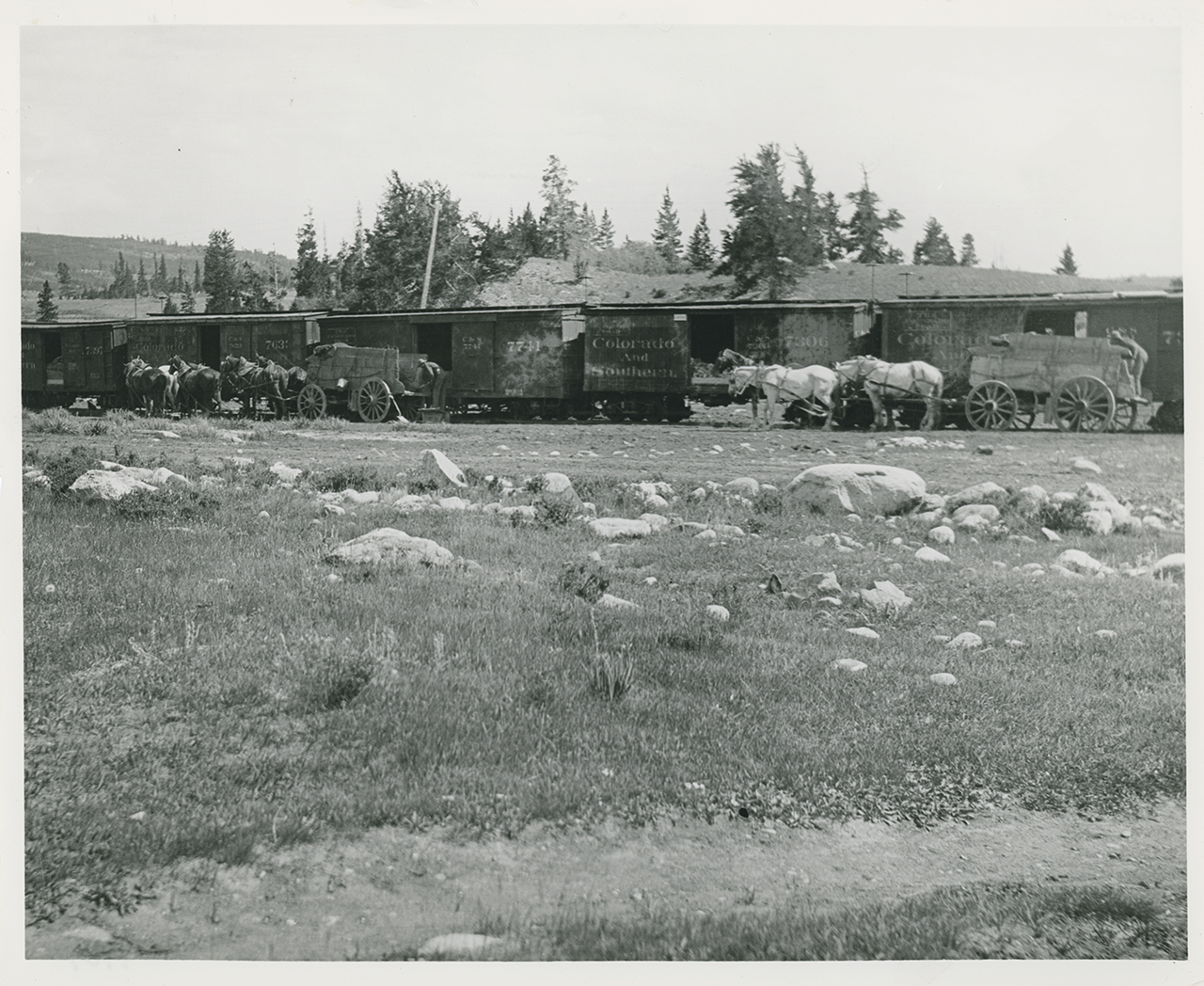
- Train depot at Alma Junction in the early 1900s

- Location of Alma Junction, Colorado. Alma Junction (Colorado)
- Coordinates: 39°16′03″N 106°02′43″W
- Country: United States
- State: Colorado
- County: Park
- Elevation: 10,256 ft (3,126 m)
- Time zone: UTC−07:00 (MST)
  - Summer (DST): UTC−06:00 (MDT)
- GNIS pop ID: 180004

Alma Junction was the terminal of the Fairplay–Alma branch of the Colorado and Southern railway in Colorado in the United States, which has been abandoned since the early 20th century.

== History ==
The depot closed in 1924, and the branch itself in 1937. It was also known as London Junction, and according to timetables published in November 1883 there were two trains per day between it and Garos.

The spur line of the railway, through Park City up to the London Mines, had been completed in 1882, the Mines themselves having been established in the 1870s. By 1884, a small town of some 150 people had grown up around the depot. It had an ore processing works, and for a short period between 1910 and 1912 (because of the death of its owner George Moe) a smelter.

== See also ==
- Denver–Aurora–Lakewood, CO Metropolitan Statistical Area
- Front Range Urban Corridor
- List of ghost towns in Colorado
