= Autobees, Colorado =

Ghost town in Pueblo County, Colorado, United States

- ghost town
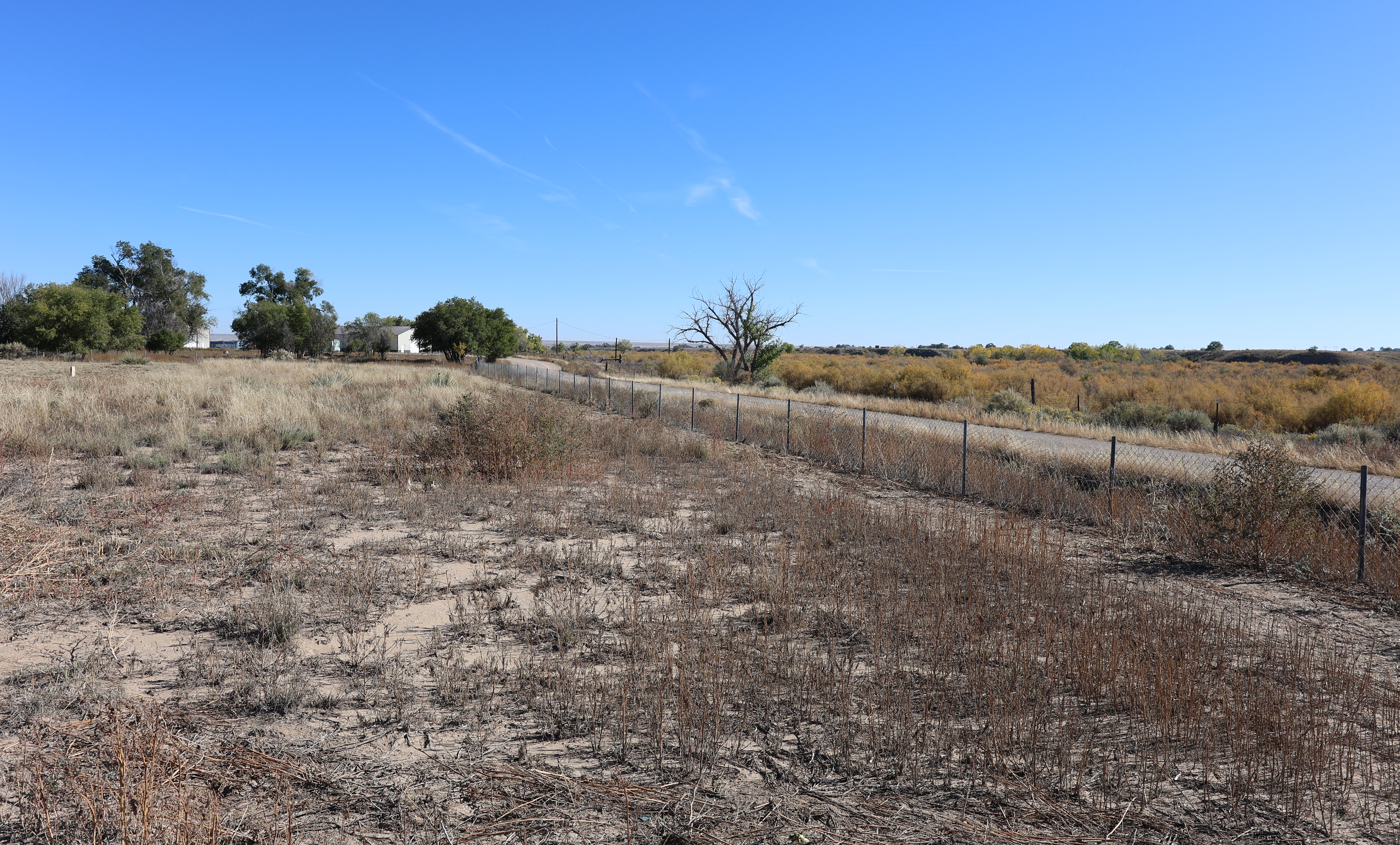
- The Autobees site in 2023

- Location of Autobees, Colorado. Autobees (Colorado)
- Coordinates: 38.2100°N 104.2872°W
- Country: United States
- State: Colorado
- County: Pueblo

Autobees, also known as Autobees Plaza, is an extinct town located in Pueblo County, Colorado, United States. Founded in 1853, Autobees Plaza was the original seat of Huerfano County, Colorado Territory from its creation on November 1, 1861 until 1868. In 1868, the county seat moved to Badito, which was on a main trail along the foothills. When Autobees was the county seat, Huerfano County was almost the entire southeastern portion of the state. Now, the site of the former settlement is within Pueblo County, Colorado.

== History ==
=== Fort Huerfano ===
Charles Autobees had a small encampment about 1845 or 1846 on the Huerfano River. The site later became the county seat of Huerfano County. The encampment has been called Fort Huerfano. Across the Arkansas River from the mouth of the Huerfano River was an old Cherokee trail and campground, which is now the town of Boone, Colorado.

=== Settlement ===
He left Taos, New Mexico and settled in the area in 1853, establishing a ranch two miles from the confluence of the Arkansas and Huerfano Rivers. He built the ranch within the four million acre Vigil and St. Vrain Land Grant, a Mexican land grant. His goal was to establish a colony near his ranch. There were Native American and Mexican people living at his ranch. The settlement was also called New Huerfano. Autobees never had a post office.

He and other residents of the settlement farmed the land, using irrigation ditches for watering the plants. Autobees ran a ferry service across the Arkansas River, which was used by soldiers of the nearby Fort Reynolds. He remained at his ranch until his death. There are no remains of the ranch due to floods and other issues, but there is a monument to Charles Autobees near the site.

== See also ==
- Pueblo, CO Metropolitan Statistical Area
- Pueblo-Cañon City, CO Combined Statistical Area
- Front Range Urban Corridor
- List of county seats in Colorado
- List of ghost towns in Colorado
- List of populated places in Colorado
