= Bark Ranch, Colorado =

Census-designated place in Boulder County, Colorado, United States

Bar-K Ranch, Colorado
- Census-designated place
- Location of the Bark Ranch CDP in Boulder County, Colorado
- Coordinates: 40°07′20″N 105°26′22″W
- Country: United States
- State: Colorado
- County: Boulder

Government
  - Type: unincorporated community
  - Body: Boulder County

Area
  - Total: 0.871 sq mi (2.257 km^{2})
  - Land: 0.862 sq mi (2.232 km^{2})
  - Water: 0.0097 sq mi (0.025 km^{2})
- Elevation: 8,583 ft (2,616 m)

Population (2020)
  - Total: 202
  - Density: 234/sq mi (90.5/km^{2})
- Time zone: UTC−07:00 (MST)
  - Summer (DST): UTC−06:00 (MDT)
- ZIP Code: Ward 80481
- Area codes: 303/720/983
- GNIS CDP ID: 2583210
- FIPS code: 08-04620

Bark Ranch is an unincorporated community and a census-designated place (CDP) located in and governed by Boulder County, Colorado, United States. The Bark Ranch CDP encompasses the Bar-K Ranch housing community. The CDP is a part of the Boulder, CO Metropolitan Statistical Area. The population of the Bark Ranch CDP was 202 at the United States Census 2020. The Jamestown post office (Zip Code 80481) serves the area.

== Geography ==
Bar-K Ranch is located in west central Boulder County in the Front Range of the Colorado Rocky Mountains. It is situated on a ridge west of Jamestown and south of South St. Vrain Creek. Overland Road forms the northern edge of the community, leading east to Jamestown and Altona and west to State Highway 72, the Peak to Peak Highway.

The Bark Ranch CDP has an area of 558 acres (2.257 km^{2}), including 6.2 acres (0.025 km^{2}) of water.

== Demographics ==
The United States Census Bureau initially defined the Bark Ranch CDP for the United States Census 2010.

Bark Ranch CDP, Colorado
Year	Pop.	±%
2010	213	—
2020	202	−5.2%
Source: United States Census Bureau

== See also ==
- Front Range Urban Corridor
