= Altura, Archuleta County, Colorado =

Unincorporated community in Archuleta County, Colorado, United States

Altura, Colorado
- unincorporated community
- Location of Altura, Colorado. Altura (Colorado)
- Coordinates: 37°11′00″N 107°11′28″W
- Country: United States
- State: Colorado
- County: Archuleta
- Tribe: Southern Ute Indian Tribe

Government
  - Type: Unincorporated community
  - Body: Archuleta County
- Elevation: 7,159 ft (2,182 m)
- Time zone: UTC−07:00 (MST)
  - Summer (DST): UTC−06:00 (MDT)
- GNIS pop ID: 184567

Altura is an unincorporated community on the Southern Ute Indian Reservation in Archuleta County, Colorado, United States.

== History ==
The Southern Ute Indian Reservation was created on November 9, 1878. Archuleta County was created on April 14, 1885.

== See also ==
- List of populated places in Colorado
