= Avalo, Colorado =

Unincorporated community in Weld County, Colorado, United States

- unincorporated community
- Location of Avalo, Colorado. Avalo (Colorado)
- Coordinates: 40°48′12″N 103°39′01″W
- Country: United States
- State: Colorado
- County: Weld

Government
  - Type: unincorporated community
  - Body: Weld County
- Elevation: 4,521 ft (1,378 m)
- Time zone: UTC−07:00 (MST)
  - Summer (DST): UTC−06:00 (MDT)
- ZIP code: 80754
- GNIS town ID: 171144

Avalo is an unincorporated community in Weld County, in the U.S. state of Colorado.

== History ==
The Avalo, Colorado, post office operated from July 1, 1898, until May 30, 1936. Avalo is a name derived from Spanish meaning "earthquake".

== See also ==
- List of populated places in Colorado
