= Buckeye, Colorado =

Unincorporated community in Larimer County, Colorado, United States

- unincorporated community
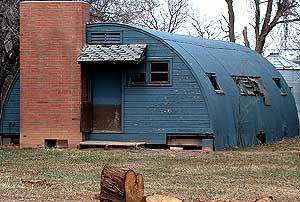
- Quonset hut farm residence along County Road 80 in Buckeye.

- Location of Buckeye, Colorado. Buckeye (Colorado)
- Coordinates: 40°49′38″N 105°05′42″W
- Country: United States
- State: Colorado
- County: Larimer County

Government
  - Type: unincorporated community
  - Body: Larimer County
- Elevation: 5,663 ft (1,726 m)
- Time zone: UTC−07:00 (MST)
  - Summer (DST): UTC−06:00 (MDT)
- GNIS pop ID: 172460

Buckeye is a farming and ranching unincorporated community in north central Larimer County, Colorado, United States. Bounded on the west by the 16,500-acre (67 km^{2}) Roberts Ranch, the area includes Red Mountain Open Space to the north, Rawhide flats to the east, and extends south to Owl Canyon.

The tallest structure in the area is a grain silo on County Road 78. Extensive feed yards are visible behind the silo which have historically been used for the custom feeding of sheep.

== History ==
In 1910, the Buckeye Land and Development Co., an Ohio-based company established its presence in Colorado, and provided a name for the widespread community. The Buckeye Ranch occupied several 640-acre (2.6 km^{2}) sections. Buckeye trees, not typically seen in Colorado, grow in front of its former headquarters. In the 1800s, the Bristol-Minor stop on the Overland Trail stage coach line occupied buildings which later became part of the Buckeye Ranch.

In 1924, a Union Pacific line ran from Buckeye to Fort Collins for the purpose of shipping sheep and other livestock to stockyards in Denver. In the early 20th century, in addition to the railroad facilities, the community had a gas station and a school; the latter opened in 1925. The railroad line was abandoned in 1965, and at that time the tracks, bunkhouse and corrals were dismantled and removed. The railroad depot was relocated further south to its present location on County Road 17 and has been converted to a residence.

In 1926, the Buckeye School opened to students through 8th grade. A stable was located on the school grounds for the use of the students who arrived on horseback. The two teachers were housed in the basement apartment instead of living with a host family; the latter arrangement was more common in rural Larimer County. In 1960, during a consolidation period by Poudre R-1 School District, the Buckeye School was closed and local students were bused 12 miles (19 km) south to the Waverly School. After the closure, the District continued to allow community members to use the facilities as long as the building was maintained. In 1967, 26 local families and the 4-H Buckeye Buck-N-Ears Club organized and eventually purchased the property, renaming it the Buckeye Community Club. In June 2008, the Buckeye School was placed on the National Register of Historic Places and the Colorado State Register of Historic Properties.

The Civilian Conservation Corps established camp No. 809 in 1935, on the Munroe Ranch. In operation until 1940, academic and vocational classes were offered to the young men, ages 17 to 23, who enrolled in the work program. Soil conversation and erosion control were of primary importance for the 90,000 acres (360 km^{2}) in the Buckeye and Boxelder drainage projects. The men planted 240,000 trees while the camp was active. The camp was sited near a source of alabaster, which was turned into various household and decorative items. Buckeye never had a post office.

== Irrigation ==
The North Poudre Irrigation Company supplies water to local agricultural operations through the Park Creek Reservoir, located on CR 80.

== Ranching and Conservation ==
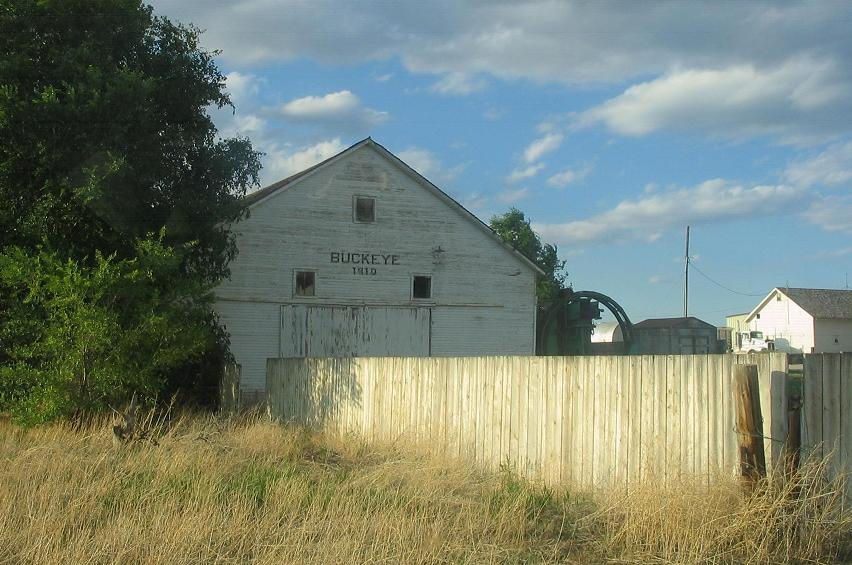
Barn in Buckeye

After the Homestead Act was enacted in 1862, Martin Calloway became one of the first homesteaders of Buckeye, settling the area which would later become the Munroe Ranch. With his wife, Calloway improved his acreage; he was the first to irrigate from Boxelder Creek. The hay was cut and hauled by oxen to Cheyenne, approximately 35 miles (56 km) away, where he traded it for household necessities. By the 1870s his ranch had become profitable through the addition of sheep. The ranch was sold to the Greenacre brothers in 1909.

In 1917 Ida and Clarence Munroe purchased the land from the Greenacres, which in 1914 was approximately 8,500 acres (34 km^{2}). Government permits had recently been made available to graze livestock on federal land, which allowed ranchers to move cattle in the spring into the mountains, returning the herds in the fall to overwinter on the plains. In 1921, the Munroes had expanded their operation to include 3,200 head of sheep, and profits were used to purchase other smaller ranches. An acre could be purchased for as little as $2.50. By the 1940s, the Munroe ranch was 20,000 acres (81 km^{2}). In 1960, their son Edward Munroe, drove the last herd of sheep down Poudre Canyon from summer grazing on the Mummy Range.

The Munroe ranch became known as the Red Mountain Ranch, and in 2004 the ranch was part of 15,500 acres (63 km^{2}) acquired by Larimer County and converted to open space as part of the Laramie Foothills Open Lands 2001 Master Plan. The open space is accessible to the public from March through December.

To the west lies the Roberts Ranch, founded in 1874 also under the Homestead Act. The ranch, which occupies 16,500 acres (67 km^{2}), is in various conservation easements, but is not accessible to the public. The Roberts family, which has owned the property continuously since the land grant, continues a cow/calf operation. The Conservation easements protect numerous archeological sites and natural resources from development.

By 2006, other area ranchers had shielded an additional 1,000 acres (4.0 km^{2}) from development by partnering with the Larimer County Open Lands program and Legacy Land trust.

== See also ==
- Fort Collins, CO Metropolitan Statistical Area
- Front Range Urban Corridor
- List of populated places in Colorado
