= Carriage Club, Colorado =

Carriage Club, Lone Tree, Colorado
- Lone Tree neighborhood
- Location of Carriage Club in Douglas County, Colorado.

- Location of Carriage Club, Lone Tree, Colorado. Carriage Club (Colorado)
- Coordinates: 39.5325°N 104.9011°W
- Country: United States
- State: Colorado
- County: Douglas
- City: Lone Tree

Government City of Lone Tree
  - Type: neighborhood
- Elevation: 6,014 ft (1,833 m)

Population (2000)
  - Total: 1,002
- Time zone: UTC−07:00 (MST)
  - Summer (DST): UTC−06:00 (MDT)
- ZIP code: Lone Tree 80124
- Area codes: 303/720/983
- GNIS pop ID: 1852839

Carriage Club is a neighborhood in the City of Lone Tree, Douglas County, Colorado, United States. A former census-designated place (CDP), the population was 1,002 at the United States Census 2000.

== Geography ==
Carriage Club is located at coordinates 39.5325°N 104.9011°W.

== See also ==
- Denver–Aurora–Centennial, CO Metropolitan Statistical Area
- Front Range Urban Corridor
- List of populated places in Colorado
- List of post offices in Colorado
