= Bovina, Colorado =

Unincorporated community in Lincoln County, Colorado, United States

- unincorporated community
- Location of Bovina, Colorado. Bovina (Colorado)
- Coordinates: 39°16′49″N 103°23′07″W
- Country: United States
- State: Colorado
- County: Lincoln
- Founded: approximately 1886

Government
  - Type: Unincorporated community
  - Body: Lincoln County
- Elevation: 5,348 ft (1,630 m)
- Time zone: UTC−07:00 (MST)
  - Summer (DST): UTC−06:00 (MDT)
- ZIP Code: 80818 (Genoa)
- Area code: 719
- GNIS pop ID: 195108

Bovina is an unincorporated community in Lincoln County, Colorado, United States.

== History ==
The community was named for nearby cattle ranches, "Bovina" meaning "cattle" in the Spanish language.

The Bovina, Colorado, post office operated from January 8, 1899, until November 30, 1955. The ZIP Code of Bovina (80818) is held at the Genoa Post Office.

== Geography ==
Bovina is located on the old US 24 highway just off Interstate 70 at exit 376, and along the Union Pacific Railroad line between Limon and Burlington. It is located approximately seven miles E of Genoa and eight miles W of Arriba.

== See also ==
- List of populated places in Colorado
