= Fort Morgan (Colorado) =

Former U.S. military post

- U.S. military post
- Nicknames: Camp Tyler, Camp Wardwell
- Location within Colorado
- Coordinates: 40°15′41″N 103°48′00″W
- Country: United States
- State: Colorado
- County: Morgan
- City: Fort Morgan

Fort Morgan, first called Camp Tyler and Camp Wardwell, was established in the present-day city of Fort Morgan in Morgan County, Colorado as a U.S. military post in 1864. It operated until 1868. There is a historical marker in a city park in remembrance of its history.

== History ==
The station and military post, first called Camp Tyler, was established in 1859. It is estimated that the Pike's Peak Gold Rush drew about 100,000 people to Colorado. The South Platte Trail was the safest route. In 1859, a branch of the trail away from the South Platte River was established in the wilderness near the present day city of Fort Morgan during the gold rush to reduce the length of the trip to Denver. Fort Morgan was established in the mid-1860s as a defensive measure against the threat of attack by Native Americans.

The military post was also called Camp Wardwell. Made a permanent fort with adobe and sod buildings in July 1865, the fort was manned that year by Confederate prisoners of war, nicknamed "galvanized rebels", who had enlisted in the Union Army rather than continue their fate as POWs. Stationed with the soldiers was Captain M. H. Slater of the 1st Colorado Cavalry Regiment. The goal of the post was to protect travelers along the Overland Trail (South Platte Trail) as well as neighboring ranchers.

It was renamed Fort Morgan in 1866 for Christopher Morgan, the commanding officer of the 1st Regiment Illinois Volunteer Cavalry. He died January 20, 1866. The Union Pacific Railway was built in the area and began offering rail service, which made the fort unnecessary by May 18, 1868 when it was abandoned. A historical marker was established at the site of the fort at 229 Riverview Avenue by the Fort Morgan chapter of the Daughters of the American Revolution.
