= Fort Mary B =

- Stockade
- Nicknames: Fort Independence, Fort Independent, Fort Breckenridge, Fort Meribeh
- The site was located very near the Wells Fargo Bank in Breckenridge
- Coordinates: 39°29′16.08″N 106°2′49.9″W
- Country: United States
- State: Colorado
- County: Summit
- Nearest town: Breckenridge

Fort Mary B was the first permanent structure in the Breckenridge, Colorado area. It was a wooden stockade built by the first prospecting party in 1859 due to the presence of Ute people in the area. It was named Fort Mary B for Mary Bigelow, the only woman in the party. (Note: Fort Mary B may have been named for Mary Bigelow, the first woman to stay at the fort. Or, it may have been named for a Mr. Mabery who helped build the stockade.) The stockade covered a couple of acres and had a log cabin at each corner. The first log cabin was built by Ruben Spalding. The town of Breckenridge was established one mile south of the site, which is near the Wells Fargo Bank.

It was first called Fort Independent or Fort Independence. The fort is also said to have been called Fort Breckenridge and Fort Meribeh. The town charter only list two names for the former Breckenridge area: Fort Meribeh and Fort Mary B.
