= Fort Crawford (Colorado) =

- U.S. military post
- Nickname: Cantonment at Uncompahgre
- Location of the historical marker south of Montrose
- Coordinates: 38°22′37.62″N 107°49′5.28″W
- Country: United States
- State: Colorado
- County: Montrose
- Town: Montrose

Fort Crawford, first known as Cantonment at Uncompahgre, was a U.S. military post along the Uncompahgre River, south of Montrose in Montrose County, Colorado. It was built following the Meeker Massacre and operated from 1880 to 1891. A historical marker is located somewhat near the site of the fort, which is on private property.

== History ==
The Ute people hunted on ancestral hunting grounds and foraged for food, but they were increasingly pushed off the best land by settling farmers. When Nathan Meeker became a White River Ute Indian agent in 1878, he tried to force them to change their way of life and become farmers. When he was unsuccessful, he asked for help from the U.S. Army. Chief Douglas and warriors from his band attacked Meeker, killing him and seven other agency members on September 29, 1879, in what was called Meeker Massacre. There was also a following attack on the forces of Major Thomas T. Thornburgh, killing him and nine others. (Note: The noted Ute Chief Ouray, called the "White Man's Friend", who lived south of Montrose was not involved in the massacre.) Area residents then demanded removal of the Utes. After violation of a treaty by the Utes and the Anglo-Americans, the Utes would not leave and the Cantonment at Uncompahgre was established in July 1880 on the west bank of the Uncompahgre River. The Utes were moved to a desolate Utah reservation the following year.

The post was renamed in honor of Emmet Crawford, who died fighting Geronimo and the Apaches, in 1886. No longer necessary, the fort was deactivated in 1890. The buildings were sold and the land was made available for settlement. In 1966, the Chipeta Chapter of the Colorado Archaeological Society installed a marker by the site of the former fort.
