= Adelaide, Lake County, Colorado =

Ghost town in Colorado, US

Adelaide, Colorado
- Ghost town
- Location of Adelaide, Colorado. Adelaide (Colorado)
- Coordinates: 39°14′50″N 106°15′30″W
- Country: United States
- State: Colorado
- County: Lake

Government
  - Body: Lake County
- Elevation: 10,834 ft (3,302 m)
- Time zone: UTC−07:00 (MST)
  - Summer (DST): UTC−06:00 (MDT)
- ZIP codes: 80461
- GNIS feature: 180161

Adelaide is an extinct mining town located in Lake County, Colorado, United States. The site of the former town is located approximately one mile west of downtown Leadville through Stray Horse Gulch and two-thirds of a mile north of Nugget Gulch.

== History ==
Adelaide was founded in 1876. The Adelaide post office operated from September 27, 1878, until May 12, 1879. Adelaide was also known as Park City and Finntown.

== See also ==
- Breckenridge, CO Micropolitan Statistical Area
