= Altona, Colorado =

Census-designated place in Boulder County, Colorado, United States

- census-designated place
- Location of the Altona CDP in Boulder County, Colorado
- Coordinates: 40°07′21″N 105°17′35″W
- Country: United States
- State: Colorado
- County: Boulder

Government
  - Type: unincorporated community
  - Body: Boulder County

Area
  - Total: 1.743 sq mi (4.515 km^{2})
  - Land: 1.686 sq mi (4.366 km^{2})
  - Water: 0.058 sq mi (0.149 km^{2})
- Elevation: 5,932 ft (1,808 m)

Population (2020)
  - Total: 512
  - Density: 304/sq mi (117/km^{2})
- Time zone: UTC−07:00 (MST)
  - Summer (DST): UTC−06:00 (MDT)
- ZIP Code: Boulder 80302
- Area codes: 303/720/983
- GNIS town ID: 2583208
- FIPS code: 08-01740

Altona is an unincorporated community and a census-designated place (CDP) located in and governed by Boulder County, Colorado, United States. The CDP is a part of the Boulder, CO Metropolitan Statistical Area. The population of the Altona CDP was 512 at the United States Census 2020. The Boulder post office (Zip Code 80302) serves the area.

== History ==
The Altona, Colorado, post office operated from October 2, 1879, until July 15, 1916.

== Geography ==
Altona is located in central Boulder County where Left Hand Creek exits the Front Range of the Colorado Rockies. U.S. Highway 36 passes through the community, leading north to Lyons and south to Boulder. Altona is 10 miles (16 km) west of Longmont by Nelson Road.

The Altona CDP has an area of 1,116 acres (4.515 km^{2}) including 37 acres (0.149 km^{2}) of water.

== Demographics ==
The United States Census Bureau initially defined the Altona CDP for the United States Census 2010.

Altona CDP, Colorado
Year	Pop.	±%
2010	501	—
2020	512	+2.2%
Source: United States Census Bureau

== See also ==
- Front Range Urban Corridor
