= Tom Sharp (trader) =

William Thomas Sharp
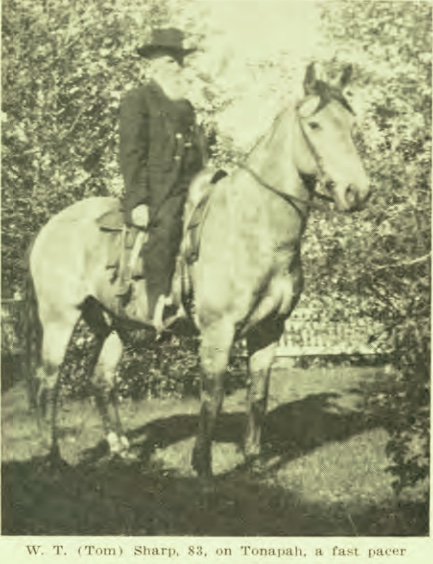
- Sharp, circa 1921
- Born: May 30, 1838; Hannibal, Missouri
- Died: November 26, 1929 (aged 91)
- Spouse: Katherine Durrette (m. 1871)
- Children: 3

William Thomas Sharp (May 30, 1838 – November 26, 1929) was a former Confederate soldier and later an explorer who operated a trading post on the Taos Trail and founded the now extinct town of Malachite, Colorado. It was located on the Huerfano River in Huerfano County, Colorado. He became a nationally known horse and cattle breeder.

== Early life and the Civil War ==
William Thomas Sharp was born in Hannibal in Marion County, Missouri on May 30, 1838. Sharp was a Confederate soldier during the American Civil War, serving under Major General Sterling Price. Early in the war, he received numerous wounds and was paroled from the army. He was then put in a wagon for the far west.

== Career ==
=== Western travel ===
Beginning with a trip Pikes Peak in 1859, and sandwiched around his service during the Civil War, Sharp traveled across the American West and British Columbia until 1868. He was a prospector and railroad worker. He also supplied meat to mining camps in California and Oregon with an Anglo-Native American named "Old Tex". By 1867, he was in Cheyenne, Wyoming, where he supplied telegraph poles to the Union Pacific Railroad and was a deputy sheriff.

=== Trading post ===
Sharp arrived in the Huerfano Valley in the fall of 1868 with John Williams and John White, and was persuaded to stay by Captain Charles Deus. He first had a small cabin where he initially lived with his wife. Sharp built a log and adobe trading post called Buzzard's Roost Ranch in the Upper Huerfano Valley (on present-day County Road 570) in 1870 and later took up residence in the trading post. He purchased furniture in Missouri for his residence. The trading post got its name for the hundreds of buzzards that would roost in the stream-side cottonwood trees by the post.

It was located very near the ancient trail over Mosca Pass and east to Badito, Colorado and Greenhorn Mountain, all within the Sangre de Cristo Mountain Range. Apache, Comanche, and Utes had used the areas trails that then began to be used by French trappers. It was a route that continued to be used by Utes for travel to and from hunting grounds and by raiding parties in the 19th century. Sharp traded with the Utes, who liked the "flashy" military uniforms that he imported from Union Army and English warehouses. Chief Ouray and his wife Chipeta were regular visitors, who had their winter camped near the post and along Huerfano River and had close relationships with family members. European settlers also used the Trapper's Trail to travel through Sangre de Cristo Pass to the San Luis Valley and Taos, New Mexico. Sharp sold goods brought to the post via wagon train. He hosted horse races for Native Americans and settlers.

=== Malachite settlement ===
After flakes of gold were found in Pass Creek, Sharp established the town of Malachite (at County Roads 550 and 570), expecting a gold rush to the area. It was built in 1870 on his land, one mile from the post, and had several wood and adobe houses. Although the gold rush did not occur, the gold flakes were in sufficient quantity to support a stamp mill, which, along with a flour mill, was operated by Deus. The settlement was a thriving community for a time. It had a post office from 1880 to 1915 and was on an 85-mile (136.8-km) post road between Walsenburg and Alamosa. Malachite was abandoned after business became centered in nearby Gardner, Colorado.

=== Livestock breeder ===
The Utes were removed to reservations (Southern Ute Indian Reservation and Ute Mountain Ute Indian Reservation) by 1876, which changed the nature of his business. He began to import purebred horses from France, England, and Kentucky to cross-breed with "rugged" ponies that had been owned by Native Americans. He received national attention for his bred horses and cattle. His white-faced Hereford cattle were branded with the Lazy S Bar and Reverse S Bar brands. Sharp was active in the Cuerno Verde Livestock Association, including being its president for a time. He was also active with the Colorado State Fair as superintendent of the horse department and promoting the fair.

== Personal life ==
His wife, Katherine Durrette was born in Marion County, Missouri in 1844. They were married in Missouri in 1871 and had three children, William, Emma, and Elizabeth. He received the Third Degree in Masonry at the Huerfano Lodge in Walsenburg. Sharp died on November 26, 1929.

== In popular culture ==
- Steel, Charlie (2023). Tom Sharp: The Man and The Legend (a novel). Condor Publishing, Inc. ISBN 978-1931079624.
