= Spring Creek Fire (2018) =

2018 wildfire in Colorado, United States

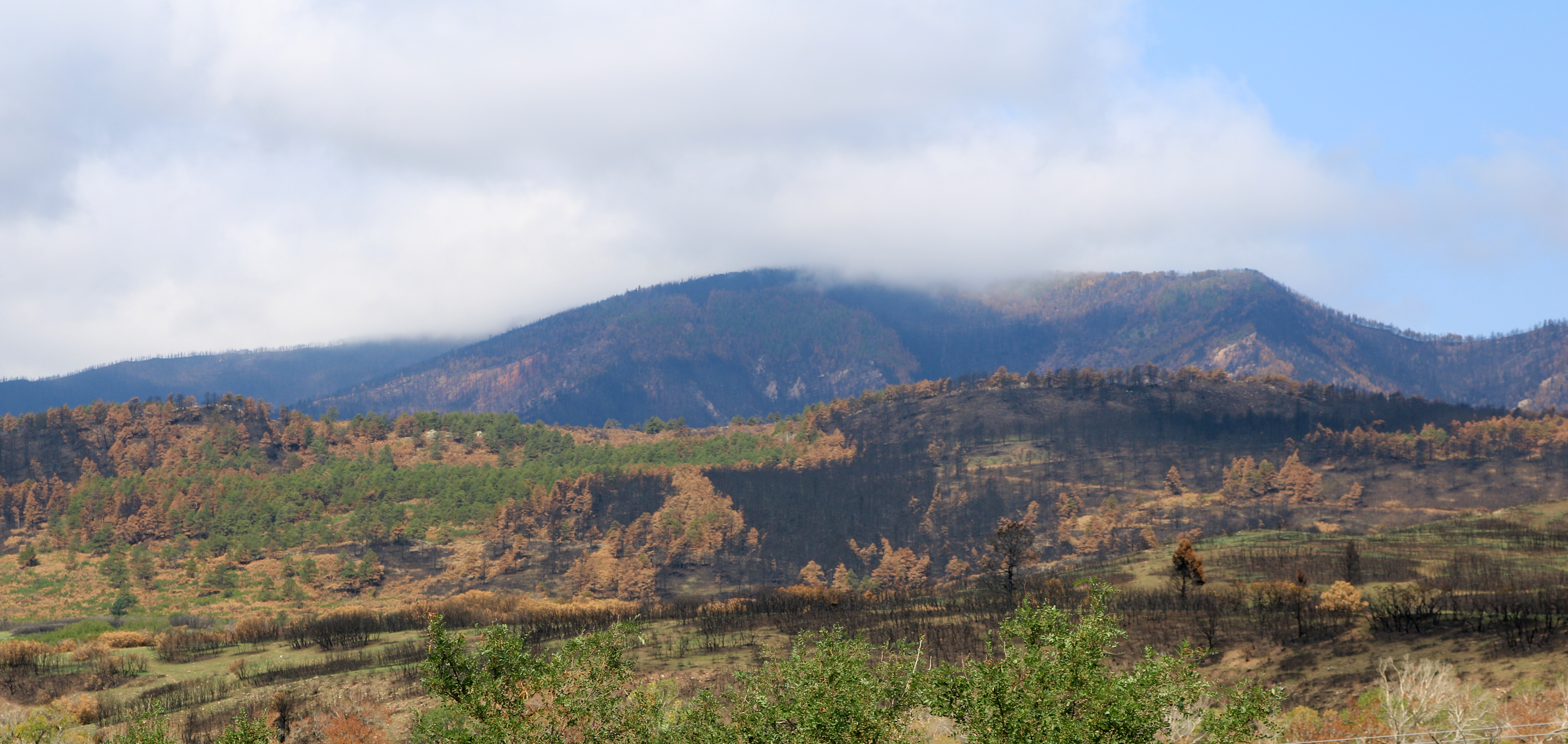
- The burn scar west of Highway 12.
- Date: June 27, 2018 – September 10, 2018
- Location: Costilla and Huerfano counties, Colorado, United States
- Coordinates: 37°26′46.24″N 105°10′28.68″W

Statistics
- Burned area: 108,045 acres (437 km^{2})

Impacts
- Structures lost: 140

Ignition
- Cause: Arson
- Perpetrator: (alleged) Jesper Joergensen

Map
- The fire's location in southern Colorado

The Spring Creek Fire was a wildfire near Fort Garland and La Veta, Colorado in Costilla and Huerfano counties in southern Colorado. The fire burned a total of 108,045 acres (437 square kilometers) and was the third-largest wildfire in Colorado history.

== Origin and trial ==
The Spring Creek Fire started on Wednesday, June 27, 2018 near Fort Garland, Colorado. Jesper Jørgensen (modified to Joergensen or Jorgensen in English), 52, a citizen of Denmark and reported by immigration authorities as being in the United States illegally because he had overstayed his visa, has been arrested and faces arson charges for allegedly starting the fire. He had been using a fire pit to grill food while camping in rural Colorado. Jørgensen claimed he was unaware of the open fire ban. He had presumed the fire in the pit was fully extinguished, but was woken from his afternoon nap by the smell of smoke a few hours later. He initially attempted to extinguish it himself, getting minor burns in the process, and when that failed he called 911. When the first firefighters arrived the fire had already engulfed trees and vegetation. The blaze was declared 100% contained on September 10, 2018. More than 140 structures were destroyed in the fire.

Shortly after his arrest in June 2018, Jørgensen was declared mentally incompetent, causing a delay in his case.

== Evacuations ==
The Forbes Park neighborhood near Fort Garland was under mandatory evacuations during the fire.

In Huerfano County, mandatory evacuations were ordered for Cuchara, Chama, Red Wing, Malachite, and Badito south of Highway 69. The community of Gardner was placed on "pre-evacuation" for a time.

== See also ==
- 416 Fire
- Lake Christine Fire
- Weston Pass Fire
- Pine Gulch Fire
- Cameron Peak Fire, largest fire in state history
