= Montoya Ranch =

- U.S. National Register of Historic Places
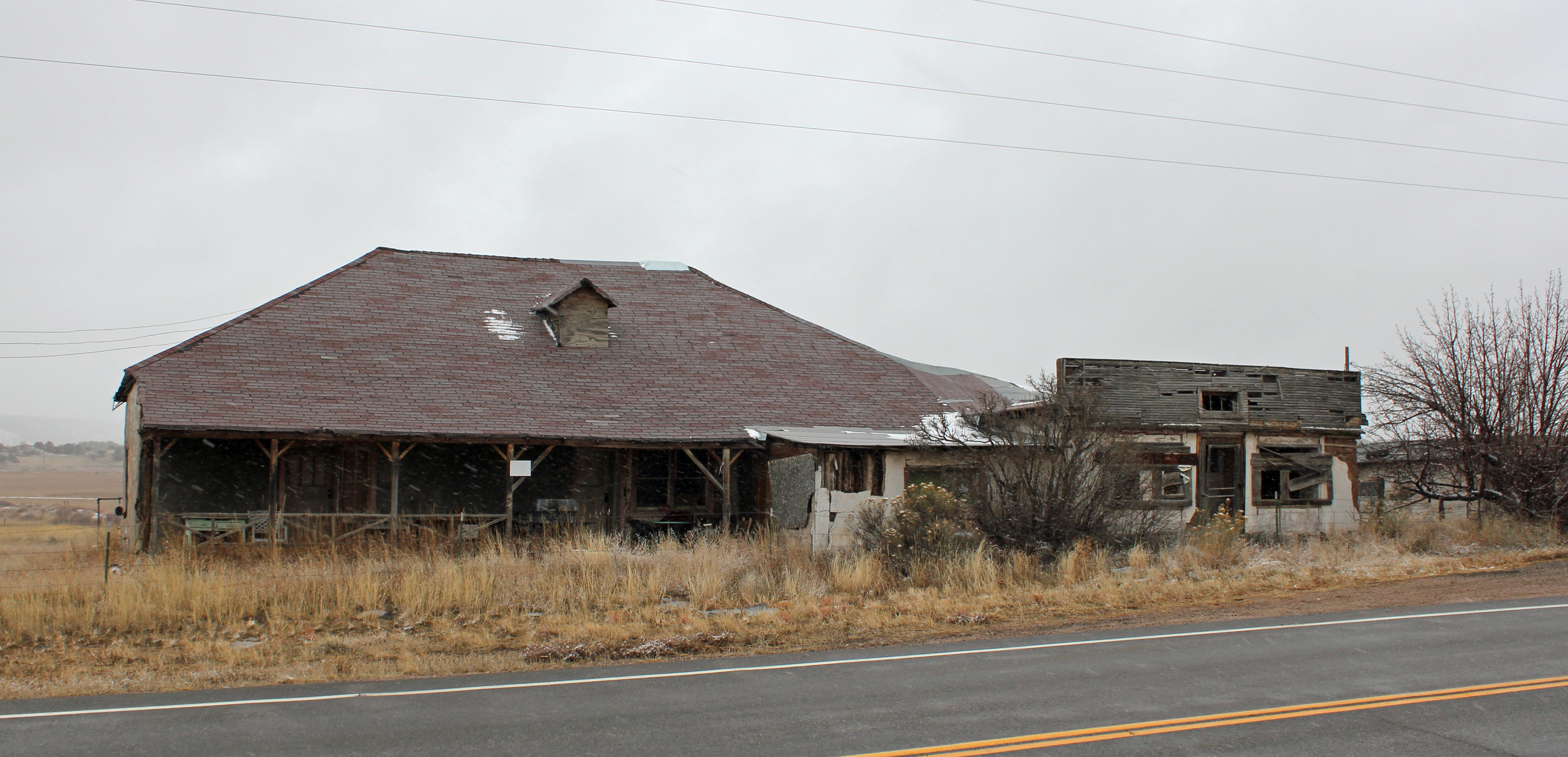

- Location within Colorado
- Location: 19176 State Highway 69, Farisita, Colorado
- Coordinates: 37°44′41.07″N 105°4′16.76″W
- Area: 15 acres (6.1 ha)
- Built: 1910
- Architectural style: Territorial Adobe
- NRHP reference No.: 12000377
- Added to NRHP: July 3, 2012

Montoya Ranch was a ranch in Farisita, Huerfano County, Colorado, United States, along the Huerfano River. It was listed on the National Register of Historic Places in 2012. The ranch house was built in or after 1867 with Spanish Colonial and territorial architectural elements. At that time, there were many New Mexicans moving to Colorado, and many ranched and farmed in the Huerfano valley.

== History ==
In 1874, Juliana and Victor Montoya ran a sheep ranch at the property. They are the namesakes for the ranch and may have also ran a store beginning in the 1870s. The adobe ranch house is the only building in New Mexico or Colorado to have a full adobe basement. The house appears to have been made fort-like. It was large with two-foot thick adobe walls and the large basement. There were also an underground ice house, sheep pens, and irrigation ditches.

It was purchased in 1908 by a family of Lebanese heritage, the Louise Saliba Faris and Asperidon Faris. The newlyweds waited two years until they moved in. They had both been in the mercantile business. The Farises raised sheep, grew produce, and ran a general store and post office. In 1911, they made improvements to the property, which included the additions of a commercial storefront and windows. Louise was the postmaster from 1910 until 1912, when the post office closed. It reopened in 1923, and the name of the town was changed from Talpa to Farisita, a nickname of their daughter Jeanette. Louise and then Jeanette served as postmaster until 1934. They lived at the ranch until 1943.

Since then, the ranch has fallen into disrepair. It was purchased in 2000 by a Taos art dealer. He has made some repairs and sought support for a full renovation. In addition to being listed on the National Register, it is named as one of the Most Endangered Places by the Colorado Preservation Inc.
