= Huerfano =

Huerfano (from huérfano, or "orphan" in Spanish) may refer to:

- Huerfano County, Colorado
- Huerfano, New Mexico
- Huerfano Butte (Arizona)
- Huerfano Butte (Colorado)
- Huerfano River (Colorado)
