= Promontory Divide =

Mountain pass in Colorado, USA

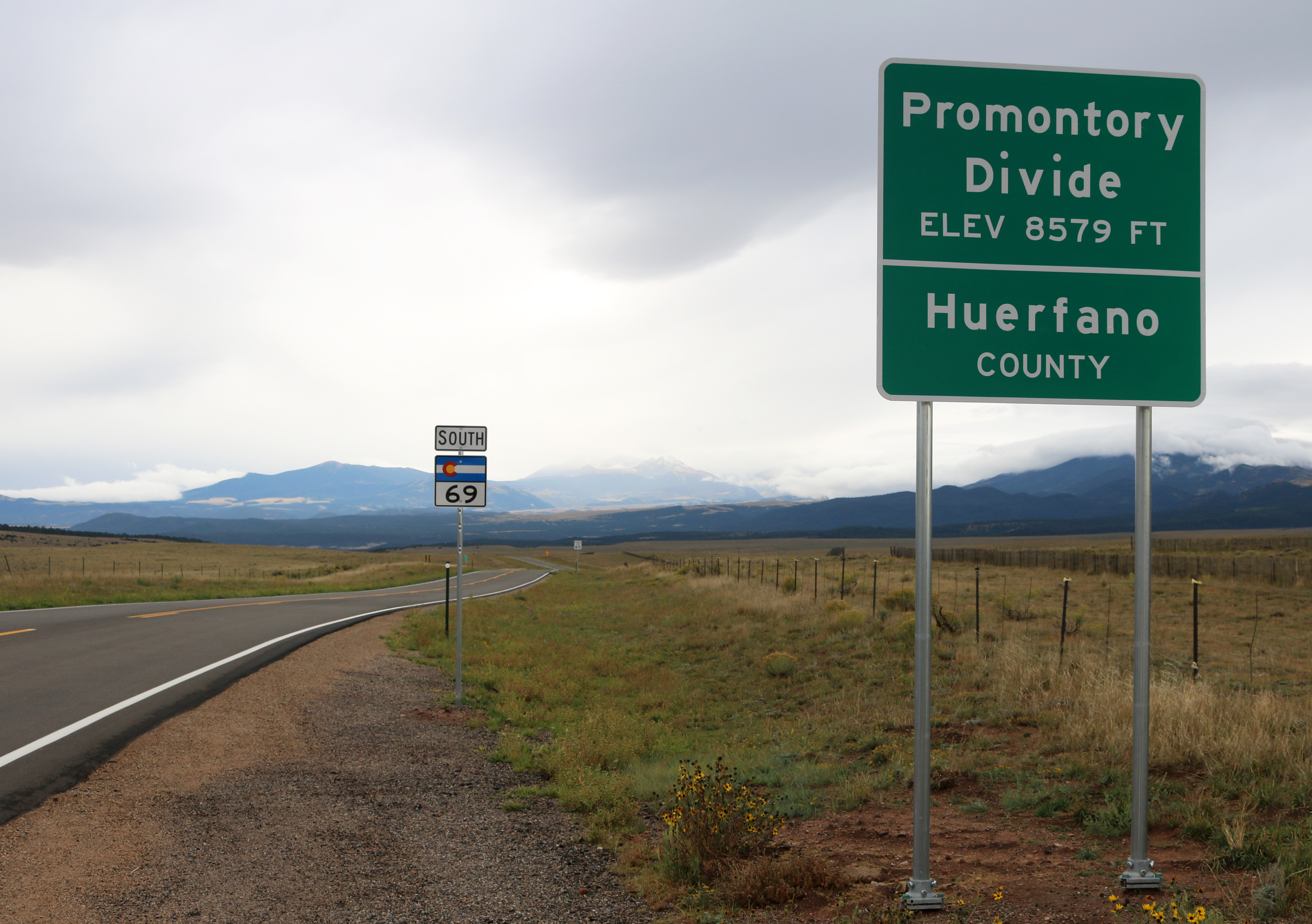
- Looking south from the top of the pass along Colorado State Highway 69

- Location within Colorado
- Elevation: 8,579 feet (2,615 m)
- Traversed by: Colorado State Highway 69

Third Approach
- Location: Custer and Huerfano counties, Colorado
- Coordinates: 37°56′16.26″N 105°19′37.25″W
- Topo map: Devils Gulch

Promontory Divide, elevation 8,579 feet (2,615 meters), is a ridge and mountain pass along the border between Custer and Huerfano counties in southern Colorado, USA. Colorado State Highway 69 traverses the pass, which is in the southern part of the Wet Mountain Valley.

== Watersheds ==
Antelope Creek drains the area to the north of the pass and Muddy Gulch, a tributary of the Huerfano River, drains the area to the south. Water from both sides of the pass eventually drains to the Arkansas River.
