= Chama, Huerfano County, Colorado =

Unincorporated community in Huerfano County, CO, USA

Chama, Colorado
- Unincorporated community
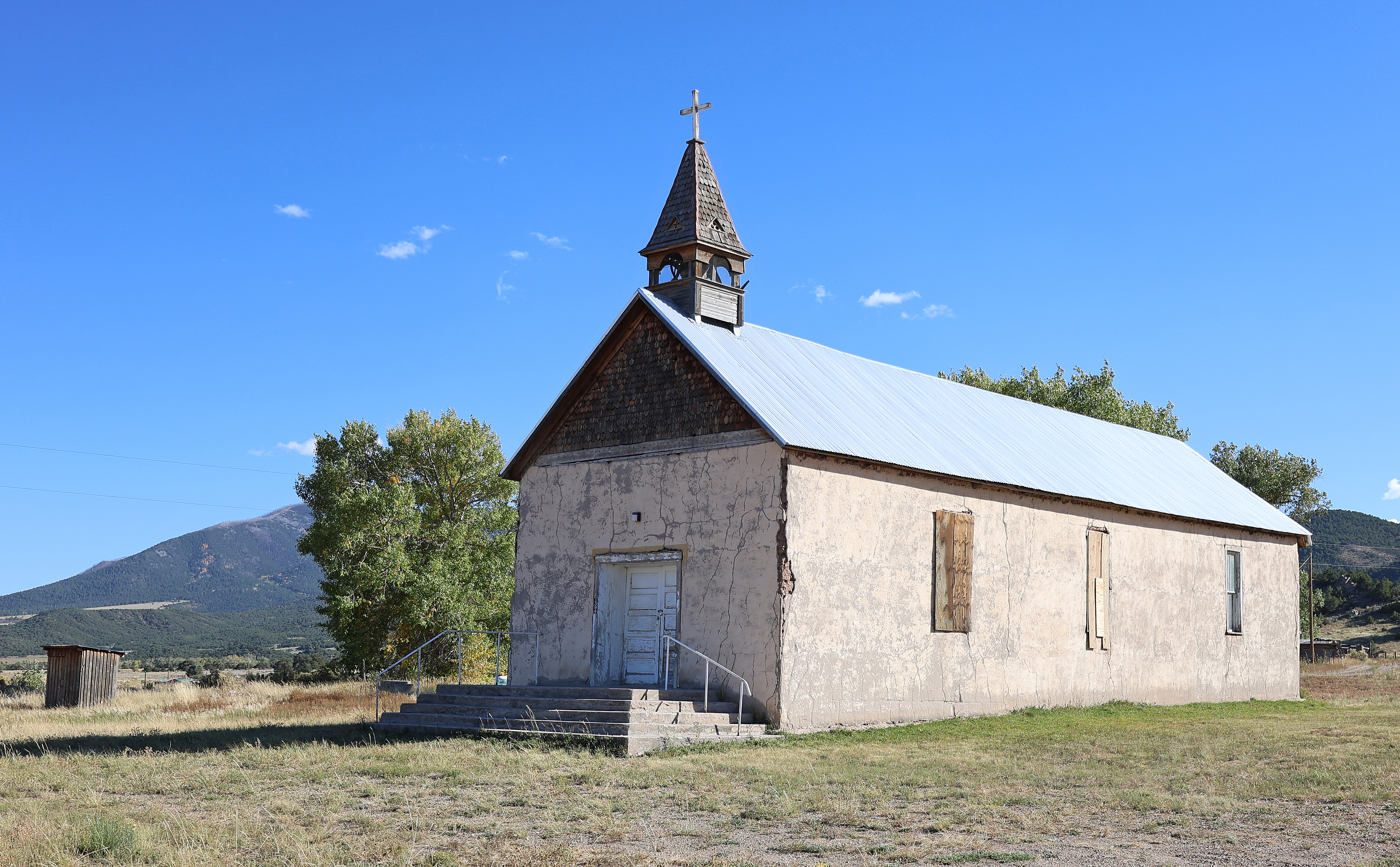
- Our Lady of Guadalupe Church in Chama (2024)

- Location of Chama, Colorado. Chama (Colorado)
- Coordinates: 37°43′08″N 105°17′56″W
- Country: United States
- State: Colorado
- County: Huerfano
- Settled: 1869

Government
  - Type: Unincorporated community
  - Body: Huerfano County
- Elevation: 7,881 ft (2,402 m)
- Time zone: UTC−07:00 (MST)
  - Summer (DST): UTC−06:00 (MDT)
- ZIP code: Gardner 81040
- Area code: 719
- GNIS pop ID: 192667

Chama is an unincorporated community in Huerfano County, Colorado, United States.

== History ==
The community was settled around 1869 and was originally called Crestones. The first settlers were from Chama, New Mexico. An old adobe church, called Our Lady of Guadalupe, still stands in the community.

The unincorporated community has never had its own post office. The Gardner, Colorado, post office (ZIP code 81040) serves the area.

== Geography ==
Chama is located southwest of Gardner, Colorado and on the east side of the Sangre de Cristo Range along County Road 575 in the Upper Huerfano River Valley.

== See also ==
- List of populated places in Colorado
