= Red Wing, Colorado =

Unincorporated community in Huerfano County, CO, USA

Red Wing, Colorado Point of Rocks
- Unincorporated community
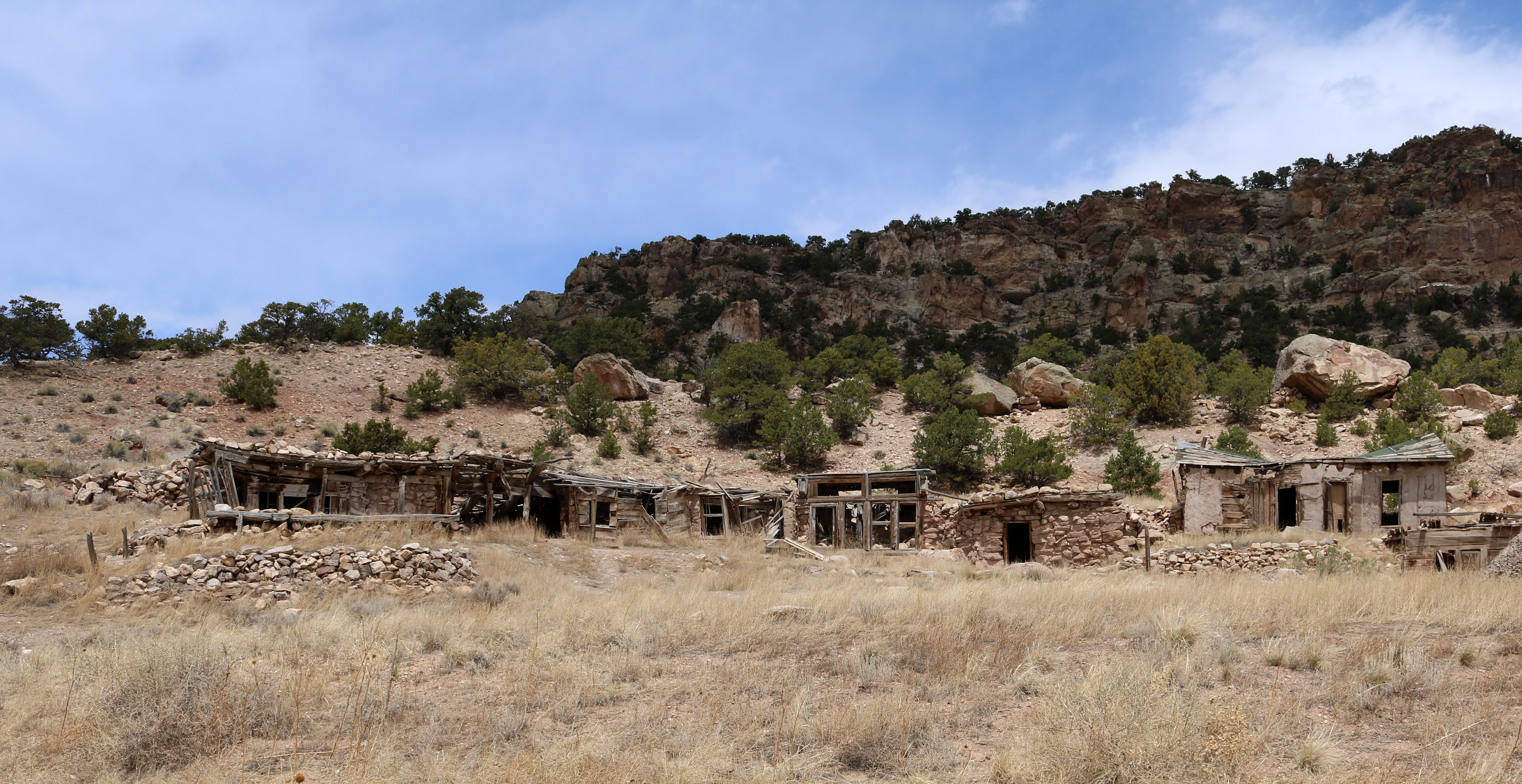
- Some old dwellings in Red Wing

- Location of Red Wing in Huerfano County, Colorado Red Wing (the United States)
- Coordinates: 37°44′10″N 105°17′24″W
- Country: United States
- State: Colorado
- County: Huerfano
- Elevation: 7,727 ft (2,355 m)
- Time zone: UTC-7 (MST)
  - Summer (DST): UTC-6 (MDT)
- GNIS feature ID: 192669

Red Wing is an unincorporated community along the Huerfano River in Huerfano County, Colorado, United States.

== Geography ==
Red Wing is located southwest of Gardner and just east of the Sangre de Cristo Range along County Road 580 in the Huerfano River Valley. The community is agrarian and has many interesting geological features, such as faults, outcrops of Dakota sandstone, and igneous intrusions.
