= Delcarbon, Colorado =

Ghost town in Colorado, US

- Ghost town
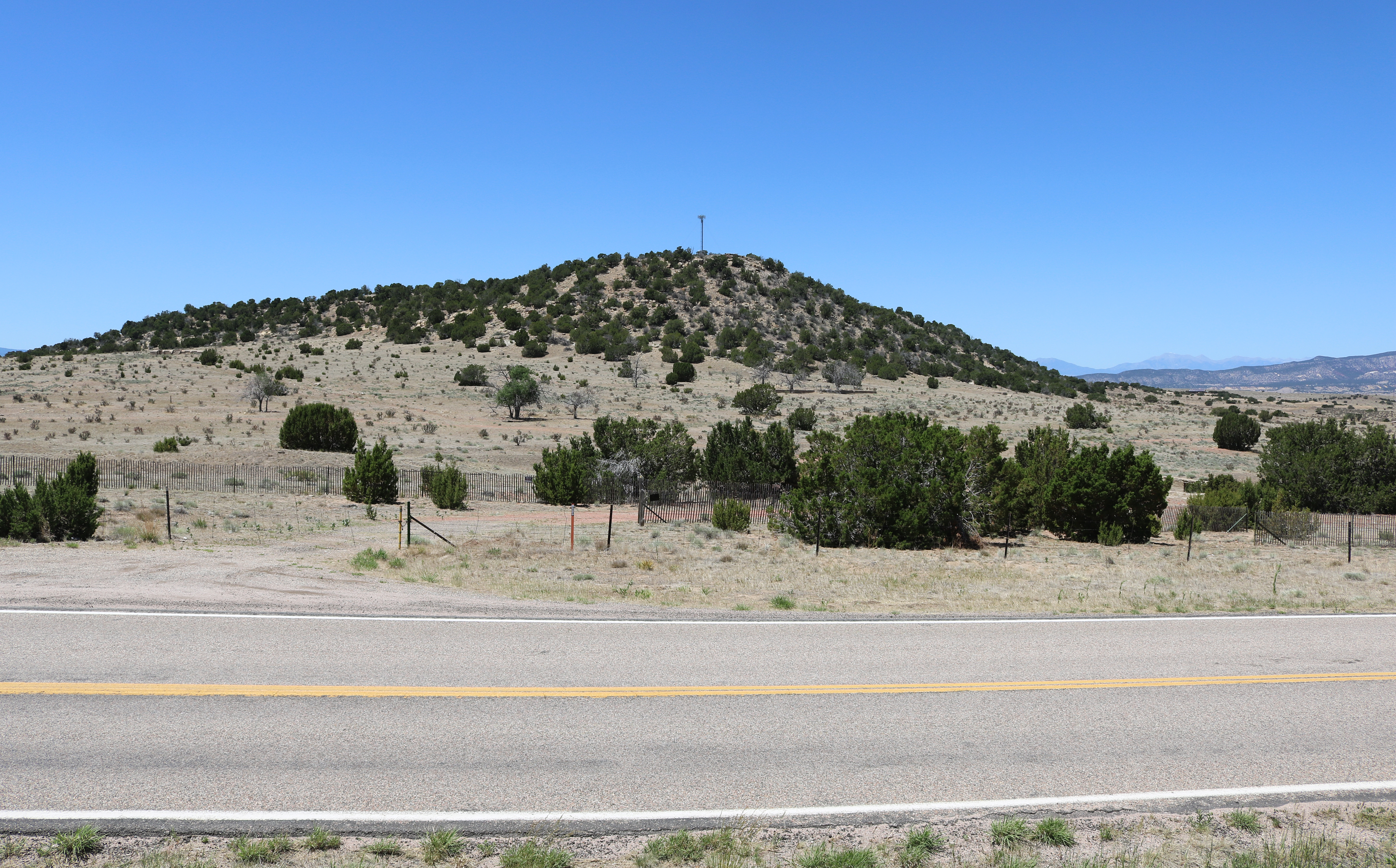
- Part of Delcarbon from across Colorado State Highway 69.

- Location of Delcarbon, Colorado. Delcarbon (Colorado)
- Coordinates: 37.7125°N 104.8769°W
- Country: United States
- State: Colorado
- County: Huerfano
- Elevation: 6,342 ft (1,933 m)
- Time zone: UTC−07:00 (MST)
  - Summer (DST): UTC−06:00 (MDT)
- ZIP code: Walsenburg 81089
- Area code: 719
- GNIS place ID: 194226

Delcarbon is an extinct town in Huerfano County, Colorado, United States.

== History ==
The Delcarbon, Colorado post office operated from November 20, 1915, until December 31, 1953. The Walsenburg, Colorado, post office (ZIP code 81089) now serves the area. Delcarbon is a name derived from Spanish meaning "of the coal".

== See also ==
- List of ghost towns in Colorado
- List of populated places in Colorado
- List of post offices in Colorado
