= Spanish Fort (Colorado) =

- Spanish military fort
- Nickname: Fort Sangre de Cristo
- Location within Colorado
- Coordinates: 37.6180°N 105.1931°W
- Country: United States
- State: Colorado
- County: Costilla / Huerfano
- Area: Sangre de Cristo Pass

A Spanish military fort was constructed and occupied in 1819 near Sangre de Cristo Pass in the present U.S. State of Colorado to protect the Spanish colony of Santa Fe de Nuevo México from a possible invasion from the United States. The fort was the only Spanish settlement in present-day Colorado. The site of this fort is known today as the Spanish Fort.

== Background ==
When René-Robert Cavelier, Sieur de La Salle claimed the Mississippi River and its entire drainage basin for Louis XIV of France in 1682, he was unaware that the southwestern reaches of the basin extended into territory claimed by Charles II of Spain for the New Spain colony of Santa Fe de Nuevo Méjico. French and Spanish traders first encountered one another in 1739 along the Arkansas River. The conflicting claims of France and Spain to the upper Arkansas River basin were resolved in 1762 when Louis XV of France transferred the French colony of La Louisiane to Charles III of Spain with the secret Treaty of Fontainebleau.

The conflict between France and Spain was reignited in 1800 when Napoléon Bonaparte demanded that Charles IV of Spain return the Spanish colony of Luisiana to the French Republic with the secret Third Treaty of San Ildefonso. Napoléon then sold La Louisiane to the United States with the Louisiana Purchase Treaty of 1803. The United States maintained the claim of France to the entire Mississippi basin, while Spain asserted its claim to the southwestern portion of the basin.

In 1806, a U.S. Army reconnaissance expedition led by Captain Zebulon Pike explored the upper Arkansas River. In January 1807, the expedition left the upper Arkansas Valley and crossed the treacherous snow-covered Sangre de Cristo Range into the San Luis Valley, the undisputed territory of Santa Fe de Nuevo México. On February 26, 1807, Pike and his expedition were arrested by Spanish cavalrymen from Santa Fe.

== History ==
In 1819, Spanish Governor Facundo Melgares ordered the construction of a military fort near Sangre de Cristo Pass to block a possible invasion of Santa Fe de Nuevo México from the United States. The Sangre de Cristo Mountains and Sangre de Cristo Pass divide the Rio Grande basin from the Arkansas River basin, a part of the greater Mississippi River basin. The fort was occupied by a detachment of approximately one hundred soldiers who patrolled the area in search of Ute Indians and foreigners. The fort was abandoned in 1821 after the Adams–Onís Treaty took effect redefining the border between Louisiana and New Mexico. The new border was defined as the 100th meridian west from the Red River (the border between Spanish province of Tejas and the U.S. Territory of Arkansaw) north to the Arkansas River, then west along the river to its headwaters (at the Continental Divide of the Americas), thence directly north to the 42nd parallel north, then west along the parallel to the Pacific Ocean. On August 24, 1821, Ferdinand VII of Spain finally recognized the independence of Mexico with the signing of the Treaty of Córdoba. Governor Melgares and other Spanish officials in New Mexico declared their allegiance to the new Mexican government. On January 12, 1828, the United States and Mexico signed the Treaty of Limits affirming the boundaries set by the Adams–Onís Treaty. The region would remain at peace until May 13, 1846, when the United States declared war on Mexico.

== See also ==
- History of Colorado
- History of New Mexico
- Sangre de Cristo Mountains
- Timeline of Colorado history
