= Calumet, Huerfano County, Colorado =

Ghost town in Huerfano County, Colorado, USA

Calumet, Colorado
- Ghost town
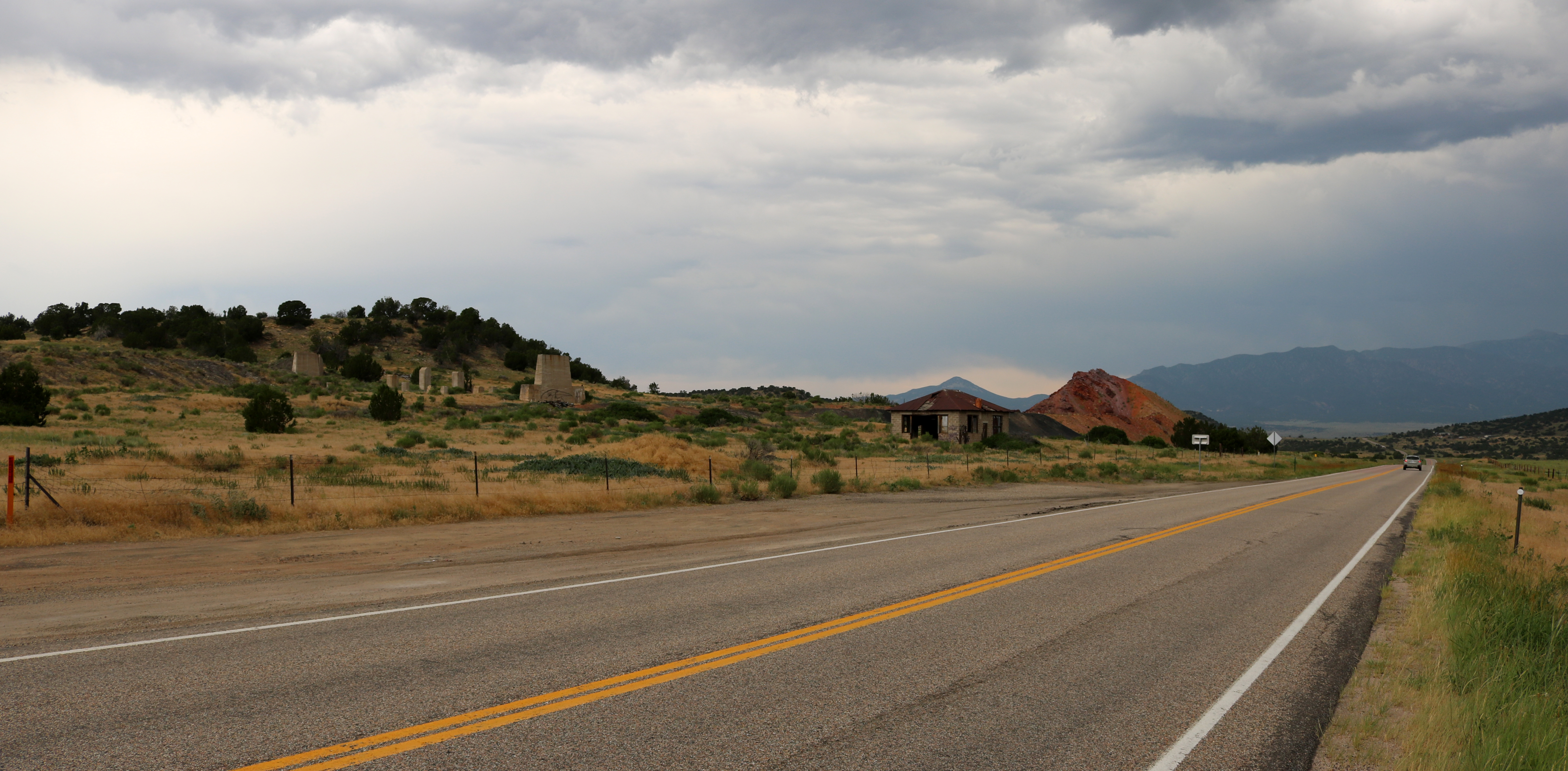
- Contemporary Calumet, and Colorado State Highway 69, July 2017.

- Location of Calumet, Colorado. Calumet (Colorado)
- Coordinates: 37.6928°N 104.8597°W
- Country: United States
- State: Colorado
- County: Huerfano
- Time zone: UTC−07:00 (MST)
  - Summer (DST): UTC−06:00 (MDT)

Calumet is an extinct coal mining town located in Huerfano County, Colorado, United States. The town was founded in 1904 northwest of Walsenburg near the portal of the Calumet Coal Mine complex.

== History ==
One of the mines in the community, Calumet No. 2, was briefly owned by Henry J. Kaiser and maintained by Kaiser Steel between 1924 and 1971. Although small even for an underground coal mine, in 1961, the Calumet Mine was the county's leading producer. The name Calumet refers to a type of ceremonial pipe. The hamlet never did grow large enough to have its own post office and was abandoned by the 1970s.

== Red Dawn ==
A fictionalized version of Calumet, Colorado, not as a tiny ghost town but as a fairly vibrant community with a substantial population, was depicted in the 1984 film Red Dawn. Calumet is the movie's central setting. This created town of Calumet was chosen to be the film's central location so that it could be related to almost anywhere in the U.S., an ambiguous American township with deliberately vague landmarks and names. This town was originally to be Calumet, Michigan, but due to the isolated location of that community, it made more sense to base it in a central state, like Colorado. The choice of Calumet, Michigan was made by a producer who came from the area of that community. Red Dawn was actually filmed in and around the town of Las Vegas, New Mexico, which served as a stand-in for the fictionalized version of Calumet.

== See also ==
- List of ghost towns in Colorado
