= Northlands, Walsenburg, Colorado =

Neighborhood of Walsenburg, Colorado, United States

Northlands formerly Farista, Colorado
- neighborhood of Walsenburg, Colorado
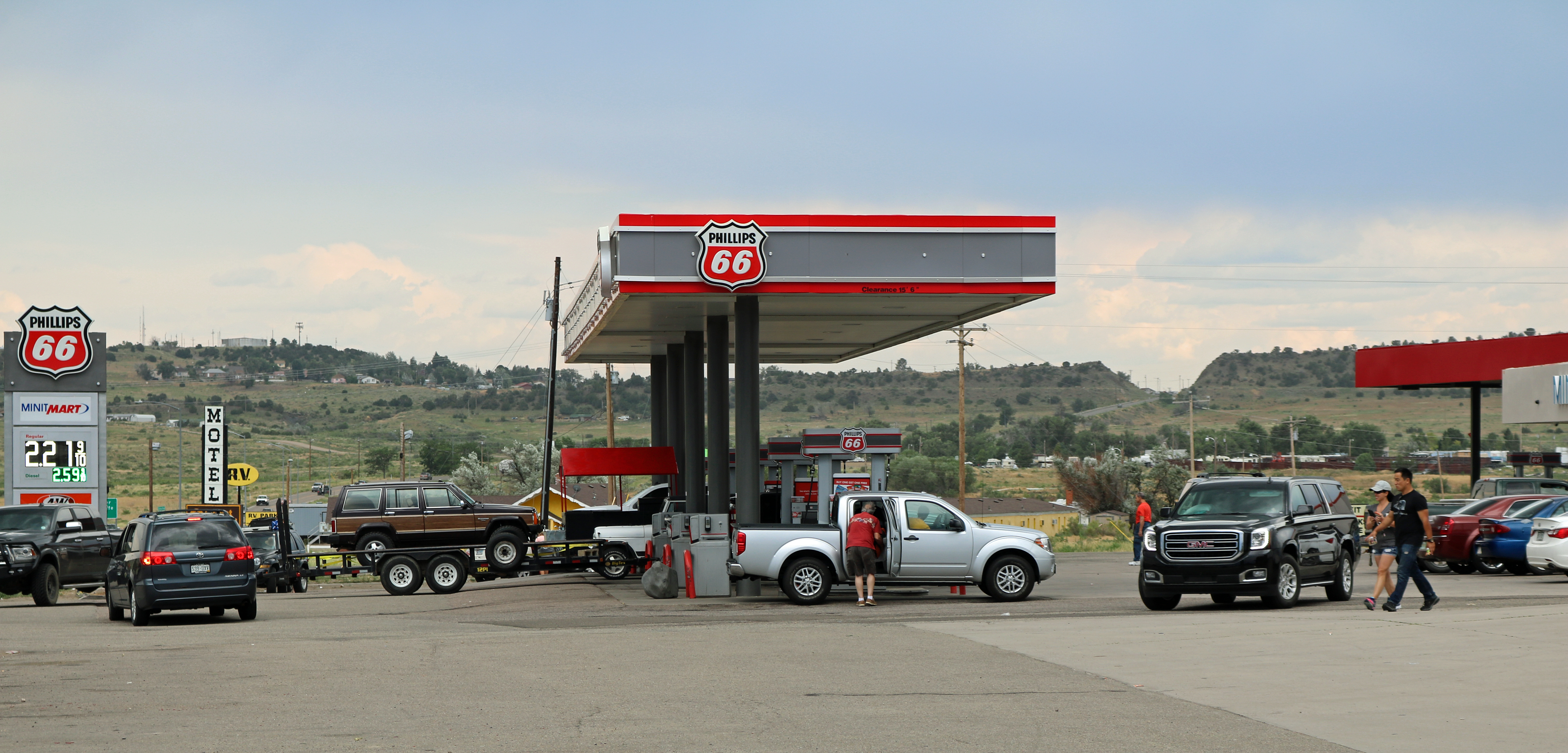
- Northlands is often a very busy place.

- Location of Northlands in the City of Walsenburg, Colorado. Northlands (Colorado)
- Coordinates: 37.6570°N 104.7957°W
- Country: United States
- State: Colorado
- County: Huerfano
- City: Walsenburg
- Elevation: 6,171 ft (1,881 m)
- Time zone: UTC−07:00 (MST)
  - Summer (DST): UTC−06:00 (MDT)
- ZIP code: Walsenburg 81089
- Area code: 719
- GNIS city ID: 2412176
- FIPS code: 08-82350

Northlands is a neighborhood of the City of Walsenburg, Colorado, United States. Northlands was known as the unincorporated community of Farista, Colorado, before its 2008 annexation into the City of Walsenburg.

== History ==
=== Farista ===
The previous name Farista was taken from the Lebanese Faris family of the Faris Land and Cattle Co. who owned much of the land in the area in the early to mid 20th century. References to Farista are often typographical errors concerning the actual town of Farisita, Colorado (named after the same Faris family) which is also in Huerfano county near Gardner. One example is a Colorado State University Werner College of Natural Resources report called Survey of Critical Wetland Resources in Huerfano County from 2017 which interchanges Farista with Farisita frequently.

=== Annexation by Walsenburg ===
The area referred to as Farista on Google maps and other recent online sources was annexed by the City of Walsenburg in 2008 and is considered to be the Northlands neighborhood of the city. The name Farista is not used in any official context by Walsenburg or by Huerfano County (Northlands is used instead), nor do locals refer to the area as Farista.

== Geography ==
Northlands is located in northern Walsenburg at coordinates 37.6570°N 104.7957°W and elevation 6,171 feet (1,881 m).

== See also ==
- Huerfano County, Colorado
- Walsenburg, Colorado
- List of populated places in Colorado
