= Texas Creek =

Texas Creek may refer to:

== Waterways ==
- Texas Creek (Arkansas River), Colorado, United States, a tributary of the Arkansas River
- Texas Creek (Fraser River), British Columbia, Canada
- Texas Creek (Christina Lake), British Columbia, Canada
- Texas Creek (Pennsylvania), a tributary of Little Pine Creek, United States

== Communities ==
- Texas Creek, Colorado, a populated place in Colorado, United States, at the mouth of the above-mentioned river
