= Badito, Colorado =

Ghost town in Huerfano County, Colorado, United States

- ghost town
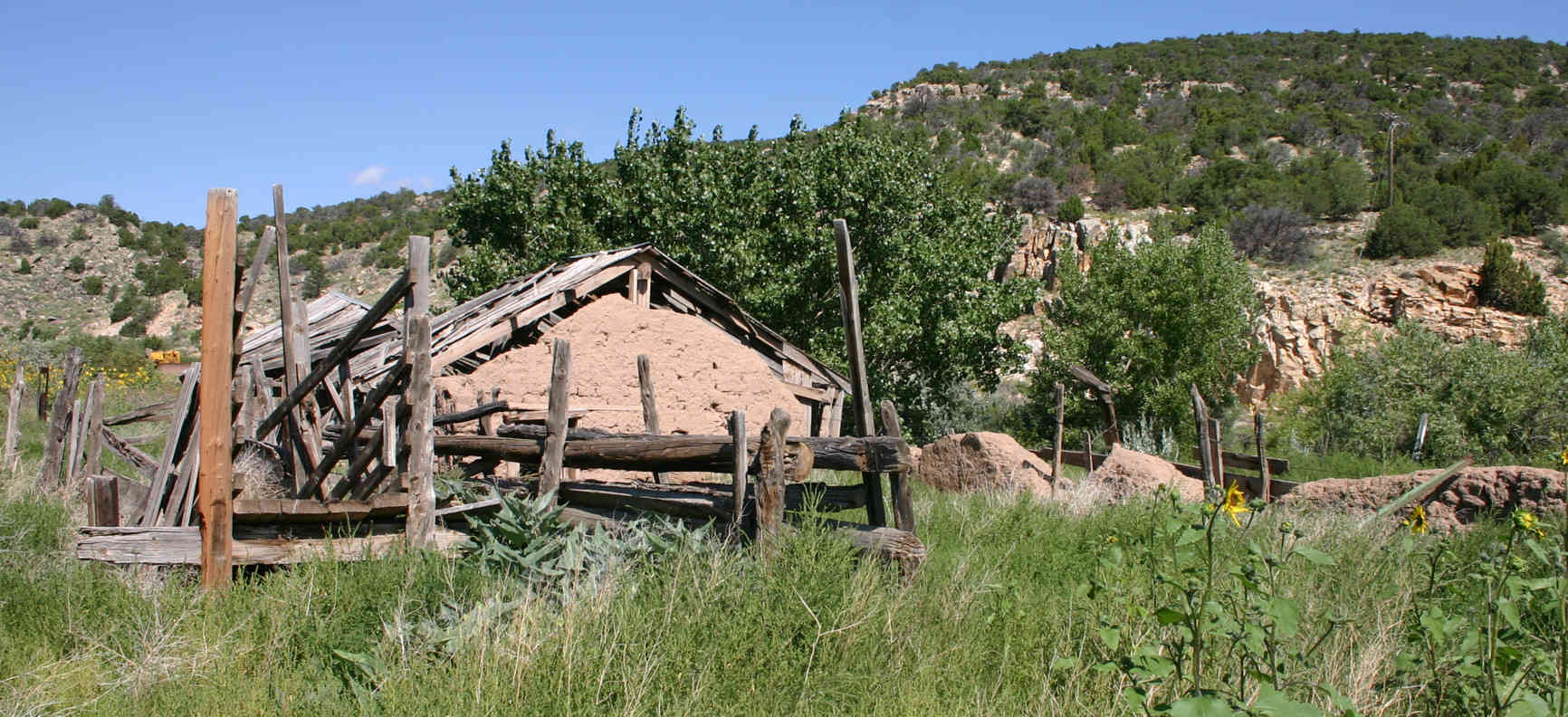
- Ruins in Badito, May 2007

- Location of Badito, Colorado. Badito (Colorado)
- Coordinates: 37.7272°N 105.0142°W
- Country: United States
- State: Colorado
- County: Huerfano
- Elevation: 6,431 ft (1,960 m)
- Time zone: UTC−07:00 (MST)
  - Summer (DST): UTC−06:00 (MDT)
- GNIS pop ID: 192690

Badito is a historic ghost town along the Huerfano River in Huerfano County, Colorado, United States. "Huerfano" is a Spanish language noun meaning "orphan". Badito is located at the intersection of Colorado State Highway 69 and County Road 520.

== History ==
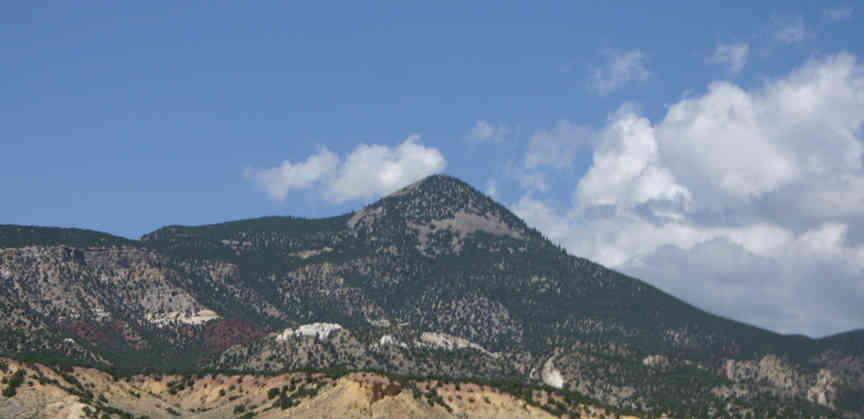
Badito Cone, a prominent peak just north of Badito, May 2007

The long-abandoned community, located at the crossing of the Huerfano River, marks a path used by the Ancestral Puebloans during the Basketmaker era.

A Spanish expedition led by General Juan de Ulibarrí is the first known recorded journey through Badito. He documented the journey through Cuchara Pass, west of the Spanish Peaks in 1706. Juan de Ulibarrí's command reached the Rio de San Juan Baptista (currently named the Huerfano River) at Badito.

In 1819, Jacob Fowler noted an abandoned Spanish adobe fort at the location. Later, the Taos Trappers Trail, joining the Santa Fe Trail with the Cherokee Trail, passed through this location.

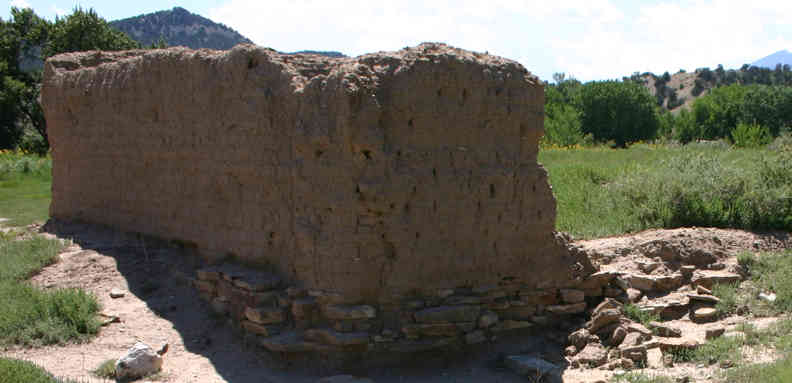
Some ruins in Badito, May 2007

On February 28, 1861, Territory of Colorado was organized. The Little Orphan, Colorado Territory, post office opened on May 1, 1865, but the name was changed to Badito on September 12 of that year. Badito served as the seat of Huerfano County, Colorado Territory, from 1868 until 1874, when the county seat moved to Walsenburgh. Colorado became a state on August 1, 1876. The Badito, Colorado, post office finally closed on November 15, 1910.

== See also ==
- List of county seats in Colorado
- List of ghost towns in Colorado
- List of post offices in Colorado
