= Sangre de Cristo Pass =

Mountain pass in Colorado, USA

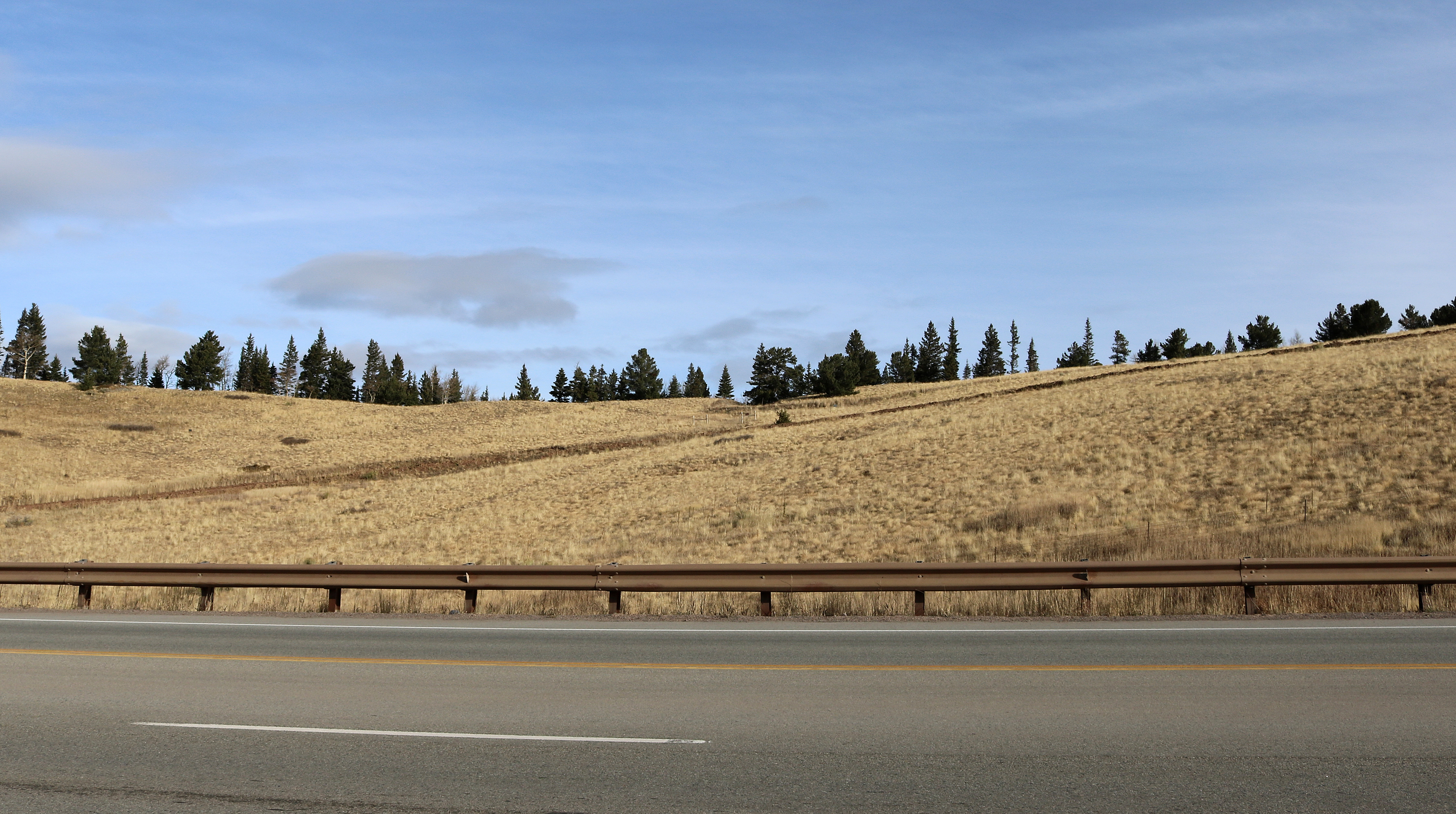
- The pass is the dirt road in the center of the picture.

- Location within Colorado
- Elevation: 9,468 feet (2,886 m)
- Traversed by: Unimproved road

Third Approach
- Location: Costilla / Huerfano counties, Colorado, U.S.
- Range: Sangre de Cristo Mountains
- Coordinates: 37°37′10″N 105°11′42″W
- Topo map: USGS La Veta Pass

Sangre de Cristo Pass, elevation 9,468-foot (2,886 m), is a mountain pass in the Sangre de Cristo Mountains of the U.S. State of Colorado. The pass is located immediately north of U.S. Highway 160 one half mile (800 m) northwest of North La Veta Pass. The pass separates Costilla County from Huerfano County, the Rio Grande drainage basin from the Arkansas River basin, and the headwaters of Sangre de Cristo Creek from those of Oak Creek.

Sangre de Cristo Pass was a popular early route between the Rio Grande and the Arkansas River for native peoples, trappers, and traders. The pass was the site of the Spanish Fort of 1819, the only permanent structure built by the Spanish government in the Mountain West north of the present State of New Mexico.

== See also ==
- Mountain passes of Colorado
