= Farisita, Colorado =

Unincorporated community in Huerfano County, Colorado, United States

- unincorporated community
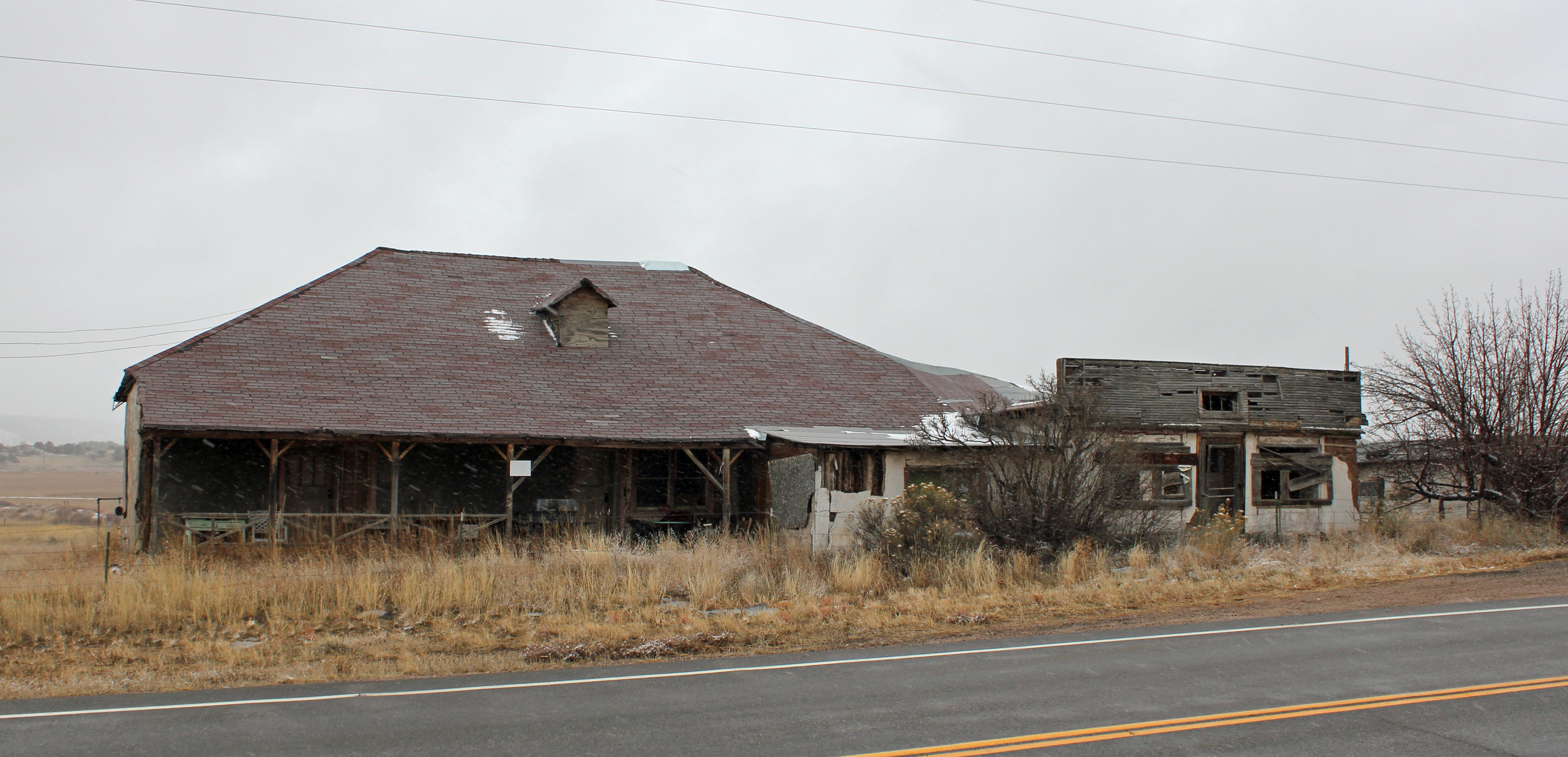
- The Montoya Ranch in Farisita, December 2014.

- Location of Farisita, Colorado. Farisita (Colorado)
- Coordinates: 37°44′41″N 105°04′17″W
- Country: United States
- State: Colorado
- County: Huerfano

Government
  - Type: unincorporated community
  - Body: Huerfano County
- Elevation: 6,651 ft (2,027 m)
- Time zone: UTC−07:00 (MST)
  - Summer (DST): UTC−06:00 (MDT)
- ZIP codes: 81040 (Gardner); 81089 (Walsenburg)
- GNIS place ID: 192689

Farisita is an unincorporated community located in and governed by Huerfano County, Colorado, United States.

== History ==
=== Fort Talpa ===
Fort Talpa, a Spanish adobe post, was built in the 1820s as a means of protection from possible attacks by Native Americans. In the 1870s, the fort was included as part of the town of Huerfano Cañon. In 1941, it was still standing next to the newer town of Farisita's general store.

=== Town ===
The Farisita, Colorado, post office operated from April 24, 1923, until April 7, 1990. The Gardner, Colorado, post office (ZIP code 81040) and the Walsenburg, Colorado, post office (ZIP code 81089) now serve Farisita postal addresses. An early postmaster named the town for his daughter, Jeanette "Farisita" Faris, the nickname being Spanish for little Faris girl. Jeanette would later go on to run the post office and store herself. The Faris family cemetery is located at the town site, and has been in constant use since its creation, with Faris family members buried there as recently as 2010. The town had a morada, or meeting house, for the religious group Los Hermanos Penitentes. It was located across the river and among the trees.

=== Montoya Ranch ===
The Montoya Ranch is located at Farisita and features the only adobe building in Colorado or New Mexico with a full adobe basement. It was originally built in 1869 by the Montoya family and was later occupied by the Lebanese Faris family who used the building as a store and post office.

== See also ==
- List of populated places in Colorado
- List of post offices in Colorado
