= Texas Creek, Colorado =

Unincorporated community in Fremont County, CO, USA

Coordinates: 38°24′47″N 105°34′50″W

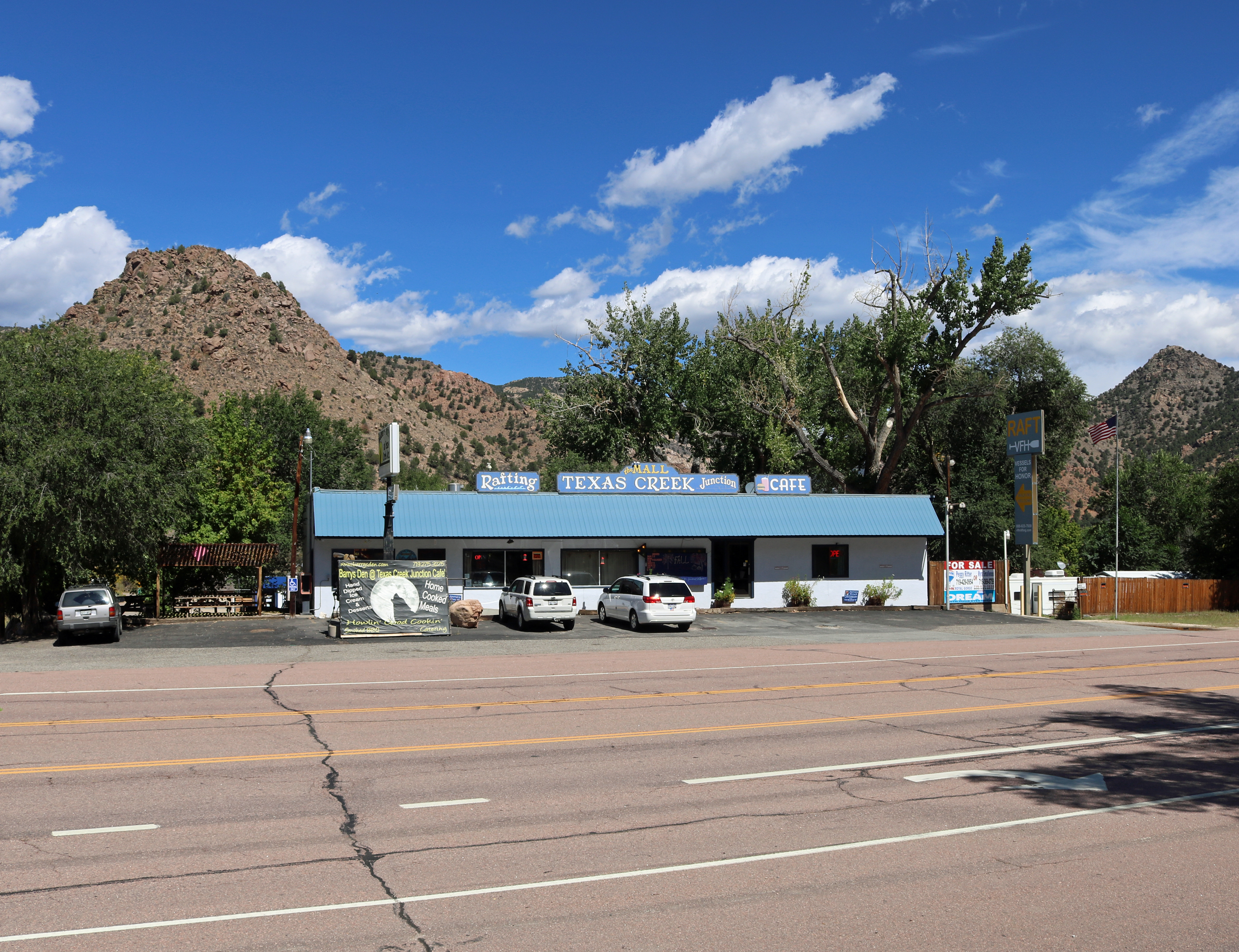
The Texas Creek Cafe in Texas Creek

Texas Creek, Colorado is an unincorporated community at the junction of U.S. Highway 50 and State Highway 69 in Fremont County, Colorado, United States.

== See also ==
- Texas Creek (disambiguation)
- Early history of Fremont County, Colorado
