= Huerfano Butte =

Mountain in Colorado, United States of America

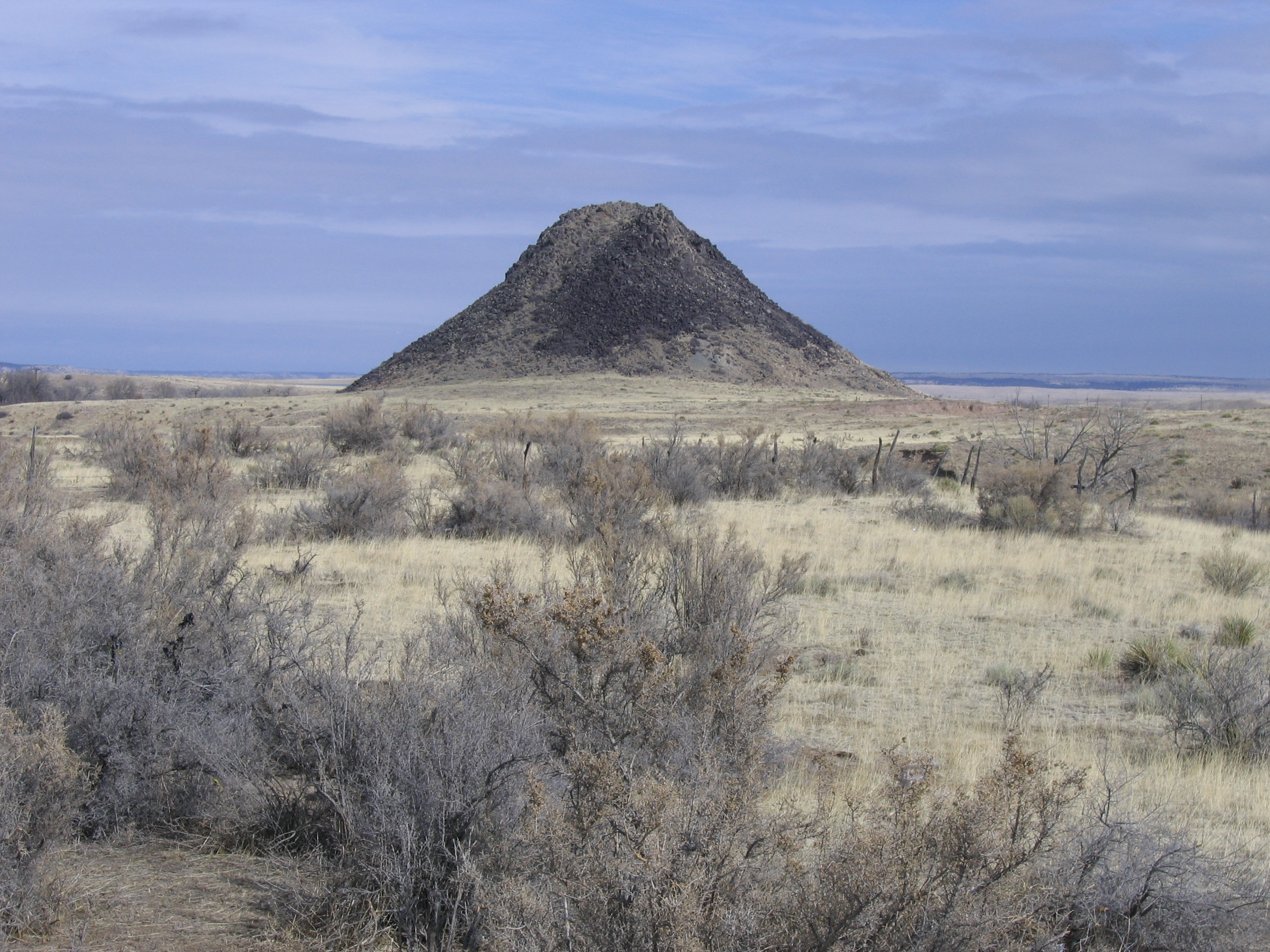

Highest point
- Elevation: 6,174 ft (1,882 m)
- Prominence: 181 ft (55 m)
- Coordinates: 37°45′14″N 104°49′37″W

Geography
- Location within Colorado Location within the United States
- Location: Huerfano County, Colorado, U.S.
- Parent range: Spanish Peaks area
- Topo map(s): USGS 7.5' topographic map Huerfano Butte, Colorado

Geology
- Mountain type: Volcanic plug or hypabyssal plug

Huerfano Butte (/ˈwɛərfənoʊ/; Spanish pronunciation: [ˈweɾfano]) is a volcanic plug or hypabyssal plug located 8.8 miles (14.1 km) north of Walsenburg in Huerfano County, Colorado, United States. Named Huérfano (English: orphan) by early Spanish explorers, it rises above the south side of the Huerfano River with its peak about 200 feet (61 m) above the floodplain.

A historical marker was placed on the east side of Interstate 25 to commemorate its position near the Trapper's Trail to Taos, New Mexico. It was passed by John Williams Gunnison and John C. Frémont during their surveys for the railroads. Places named after the butte include Huerfano County and the Huerfano River.

== See also ==
- List of Colorado mountain ranges
- List of Colorado mountain summits
  - List of Colorado fourteeners
  - List of Colorado 4000 meter prominent summits
  - List of the most prominent summits of Colorado
- List of Colorado county high points
