= Colorado State Highway 69 =

Highway in Colorado

State Highway 69
- SH 69 highlighted in red

Route information
- Maintained by CDOT
- Length: 82.664 mi (133.035 km)

Major junctions
- North end: US 50 in Texas Creek
- South end: I-25 BL near Walsenburg

Location
- Country: United States
- State: Colorado
- Counties: Huerfano, Custer, Fremont

Highway system
- Colorado State Highway System; Interstate; US; State; Scenic
← SH 67	→ I-70

State Highway 69 (SH 69) is an 82.664-mile-long (133.035 km) state highway in the US state of Colorado. SH 69's northern terminus is at U.S. Route 50 (US 50) in Texas Creek, and the southern terminus is at Interstate 25 Business (I-25 Bus.) north of Walsenburg.

== Route description ==
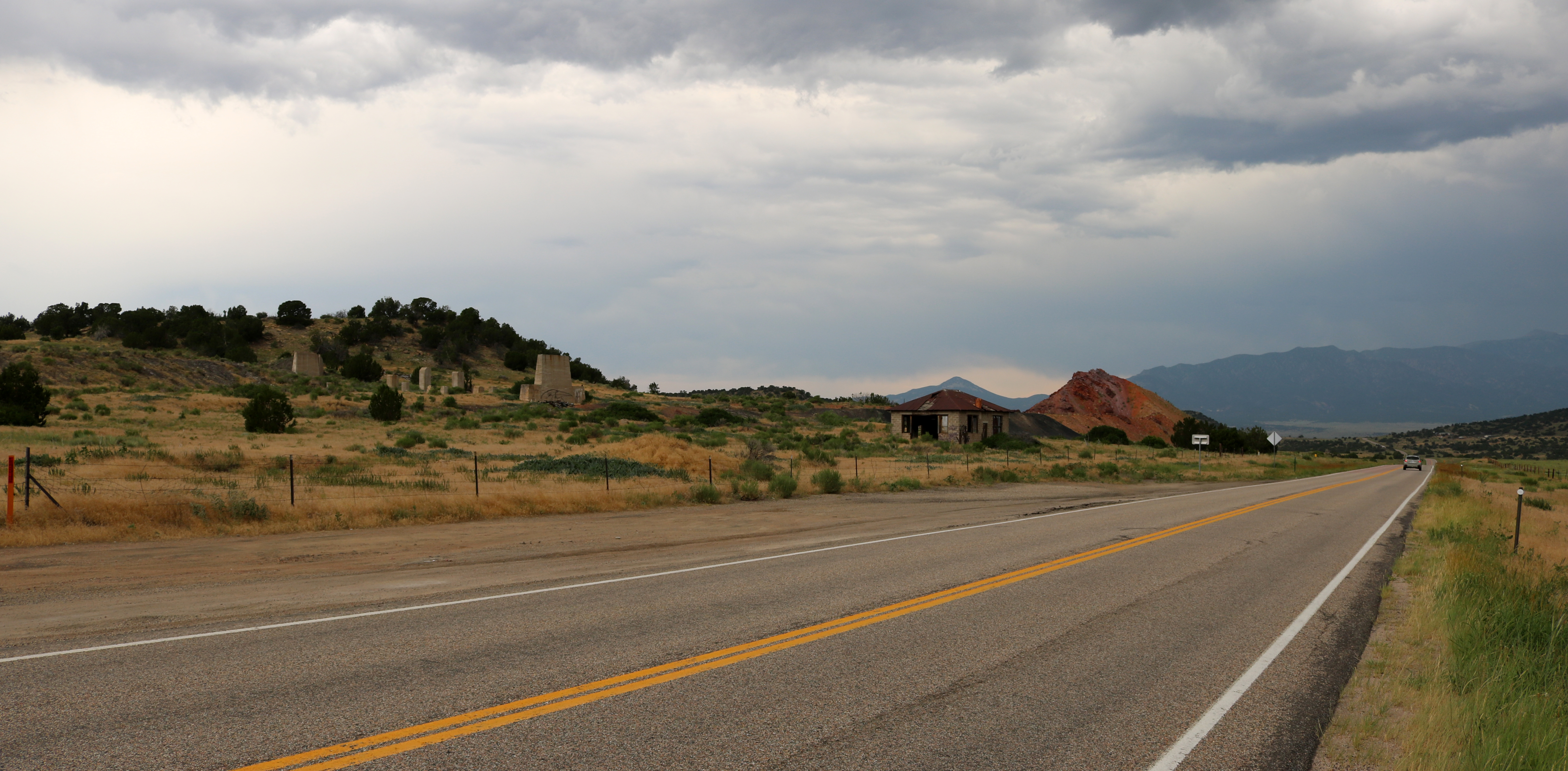
SH 69 with Calumet in the background

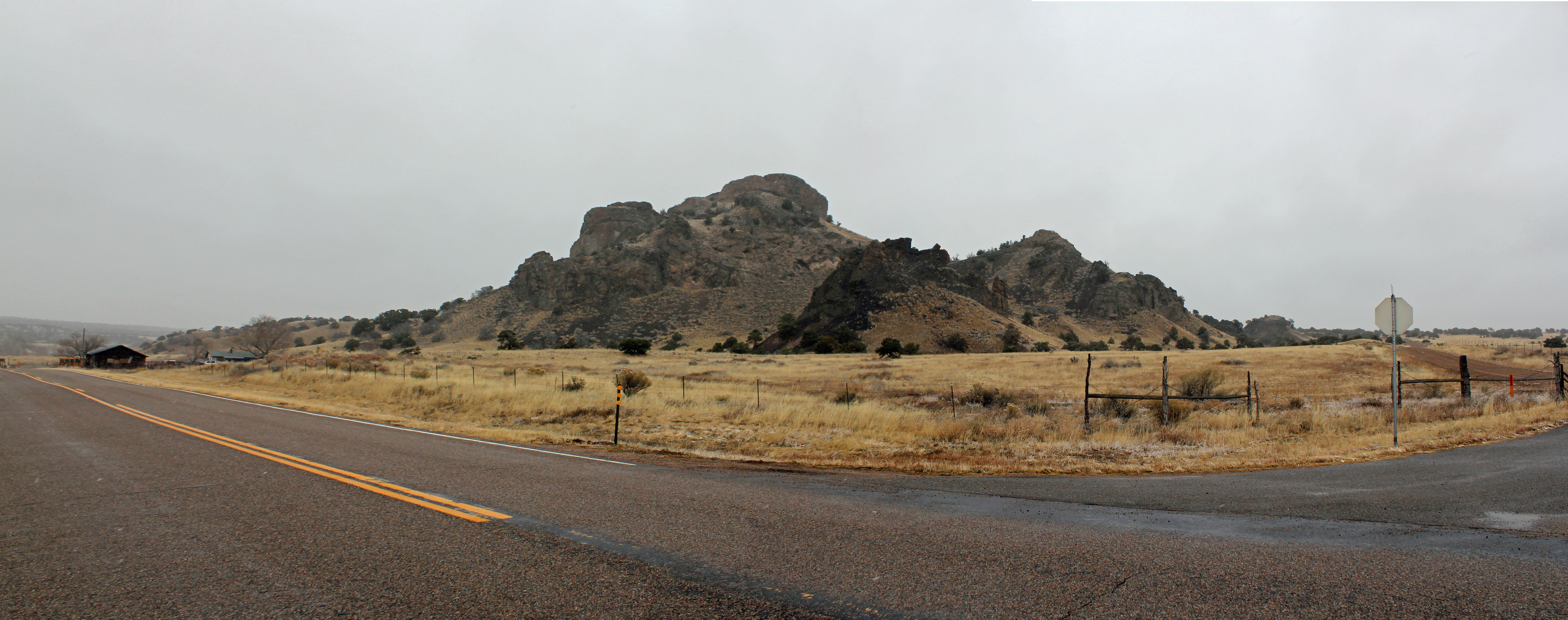
SH 69 with Gardner Butte in the background

SH 69 starts at a junction with I-25 Bus. just north of Walsenburg. The highway heads northwest over Long Saddle Pass and Promontory Divide Pass to Westcliffe and ends at the Texas Creek junction with US 50 between Cañon City and Salida.

== Major intersections ==
County	Location	mi	km	Destinations	Notes
Huerfano	Farista	0.000	0.000	I-25 BL – Walsenburg, Pueblo	Southern terminus
Custer	Westcliffe	58.705	94.477	SH 96 east – Pueblo	Western end of SH 96
Fremont	Texas Creek	82.664	133.035	US 50 – Cañon City, Cotopaxi, Salida	Northern terminus
1.000 mi = 1.609 km; 1.000 km = 0.621 mi
