= Gardner, Colorado =

Census-designated place in Huerfano County, CO, USA

- Census-designated place
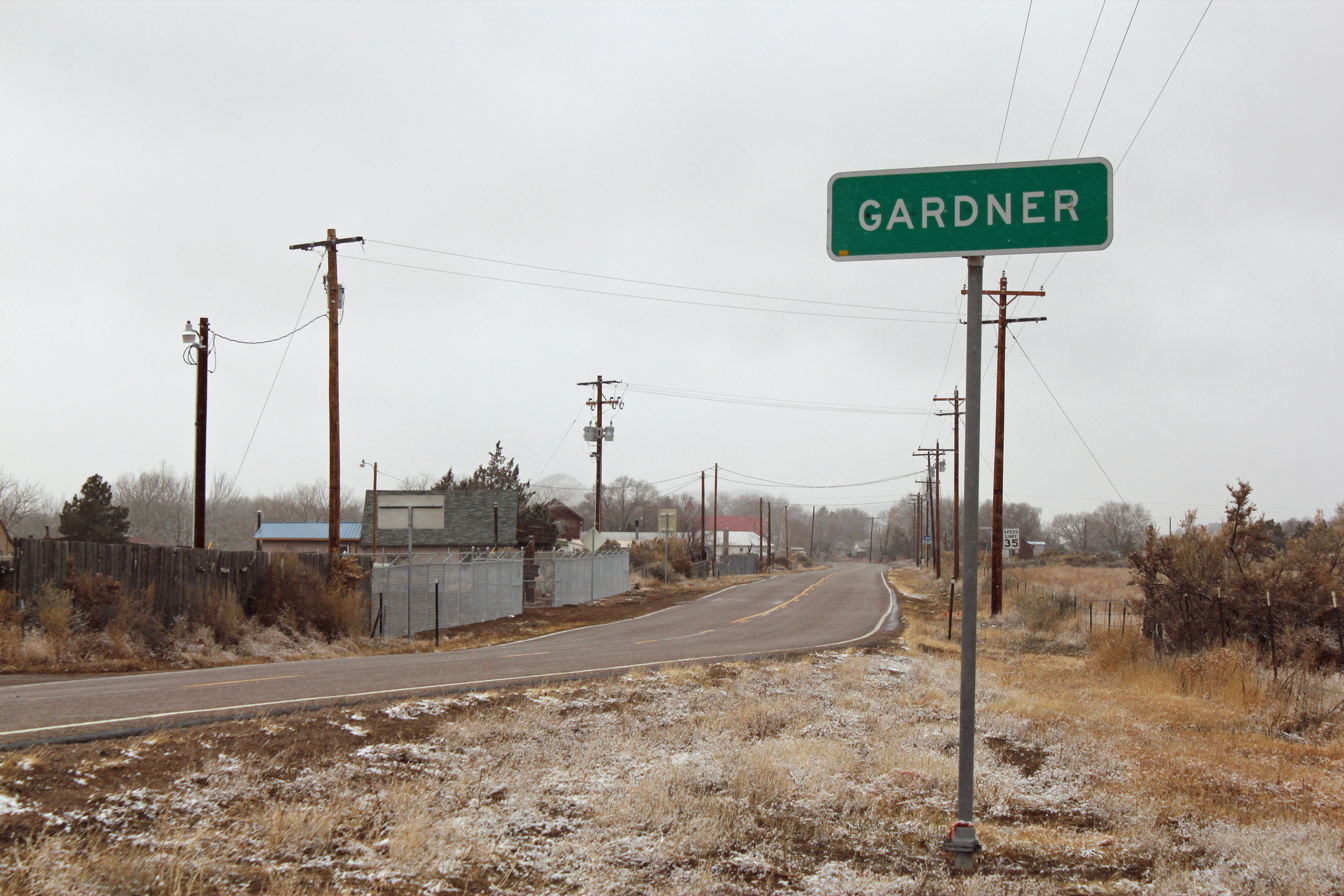
- Gardner on a snowy day in late 2014.

- Location of the Gardner CDP in the State of Colorado.
- Coordinates: 37°47′20″N 105°09′52″W
- Country: United States
- State: Colorado
- County: Huerfano County

Government
  - Type: Unincorporated town

Area
  - Total: 2.472 sq mi (6.403 km^{2})
  - Land: 2.472 sq mi (6.403 km^{2})
  - Water: 0 sq mi (0.000 km^{2})
- Elevation: 7,021 ft (2,140 m)

Population (2020)
  - Total: 106
  - Density: 42.9/sq mi (16.6/km^{2})
- Time zone: UTC-7 (MST)
  - Summer (DST): UTC-6 (MDT)
- ZIP Code: 81040
- Area code: 719
- GNIS feature ID: 2805922

Gardner is a census-designated place (CDP) and post office in and governed by Huerfano County, Colorado, United States. The Gardner post office has the ZIP Code 81040. At the United States Census 2020, the population of the Gardner CDP was 106.

== History ==
The Gardner Post Office has been in operation since 1871. The community has the name of Herbert Gardner, a local pioneer. Herbert was the son of Henry Gardner.

== Geography ==
The Gardner CDP has an area of 1,582 acres (6.403 km^{2}), all land.

== Demographics ==
Historical population
| Census | Pop. | Note | %± |
|---|---|---|---|
| 2020 | 106 | | — |
United States Census Bureau

The United States Census Bureau defined the Gardner CDP for the United States Census 2020.

== Education ==
It is in the Huerfano School District RE-1.

== See also ==
- List of census-designated places in Colorado
