= Huerfano River =

River in Pueblo and Huerfano counties in Colorado, United States

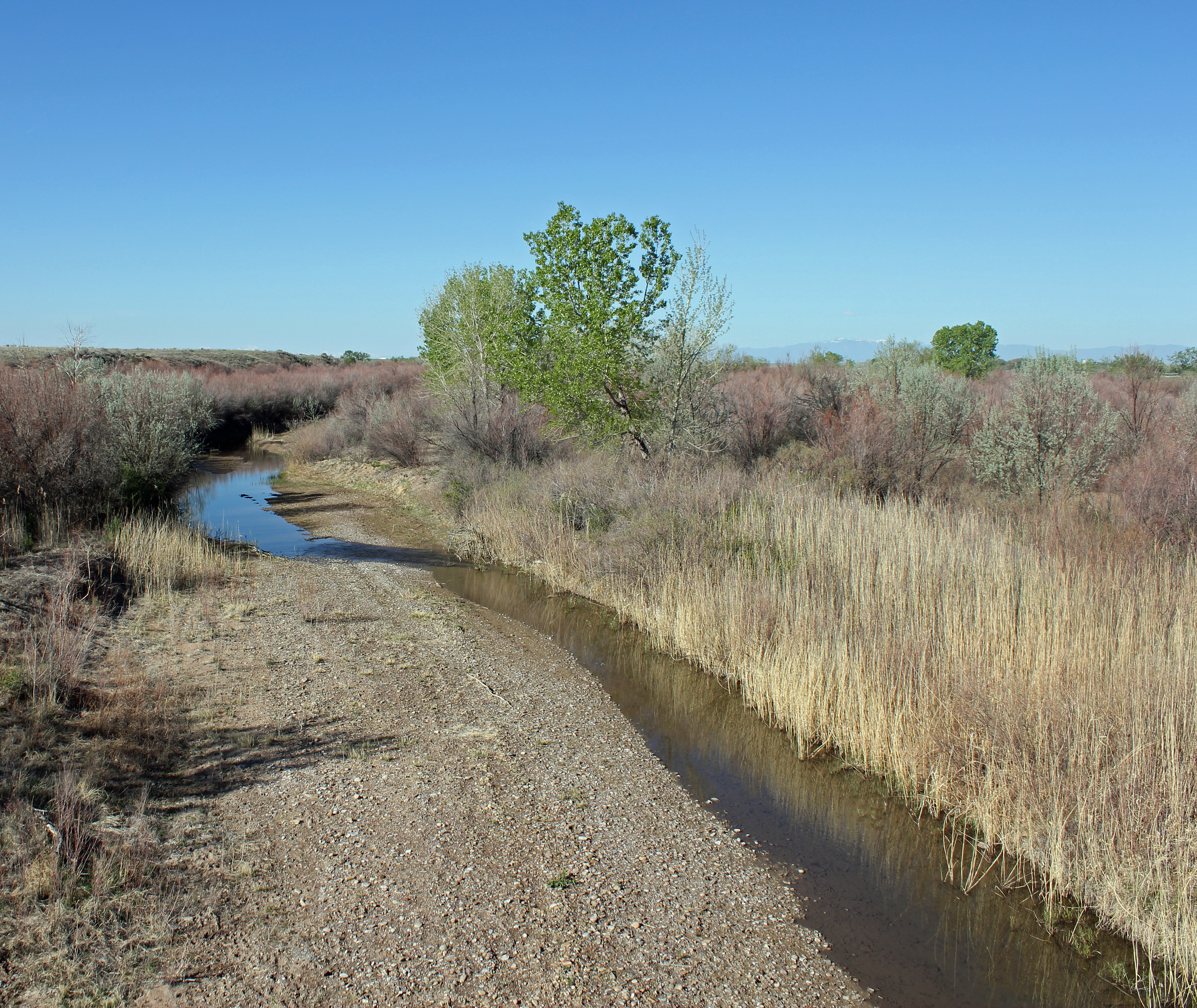
- The river just before it goes under U.S. Highway 50 in Pueblo County.

Physical characteristics
- Source
  - coordinates: 37°35′50″N 105°29′40″W
- Mouth
  - location: Confluence with Arkansas
  - coordinates: 38°13′43″N 104°14′45″W
  - elevation: 4,442 ft (1,354 m)
- Discharge
  - location: Boone, Colorado
  - average: 31 cu/ft. per sec.

Basin features
- Progression: Arkansas—Mississippi

The Huerfano River is a 113-mile-long (182 km) tributary of the Arkansas River in Pueblo and Huerfano counties in Colorado, United States.

== Description ==
The river flows from a source on Blanca Peak in the Sangre de Cristo Mountains of Colorado. It joins the Arkansas in Pueblo County just south of the town of Boone. One major tributary is the Cucharas River.

The Huerfano River was named after the nearby Huerfano Butte. Huerfano is derived from a Spanish name meaning "orphan", so named from the butte's remote location.

== See also ==
- List of rivers of Colorado
