= Huerfano County, Colorado =

County in Colorado, United States

- county
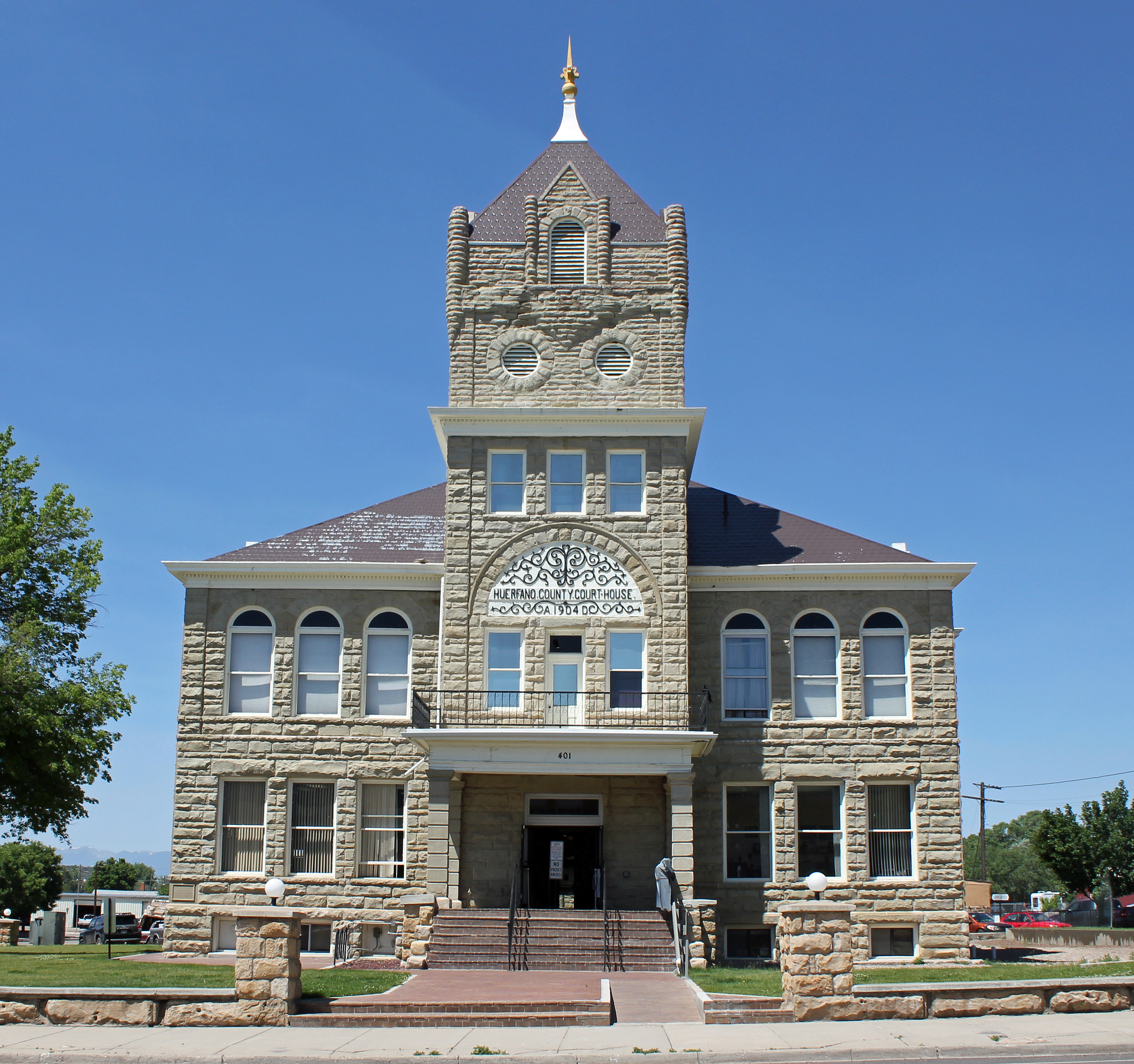
- Huerfano County Courthouse and Jail

- Location within the U.S. state of Colorado
- Coordinates: 37.69°N 104.96°W
- Country: United States
- State: Colorado
- Founded: November 1, 1861
- Named for: Huerfano Butte
- Seat: Walsenburg
- Largest City: Walsenburg
- Other cities: La Veta

Area
  - Total: 1,593.27 sq mi (4,126.6 km^{2})
  - Land: 1,591.03 sq mi (4,120.7 km^{2})
  - Water: 2.24 sq mi (5.8 km^{2}) 0.14%

Population (2020)
  - Total: 6,820
  - Estimate (2025): 7,011 ▲
  - Density: 4.39/sq mi (1.69/km^{2})
- Time zone: UTC−7 (Mountain)
  - Summer (DST): UTC−6 (MDT)
- Area code: 719
- Congressional district: 3rd
- Website: www.huerfano.us

Huerfano County (/ˈwɛərfənoʊ/ WAIR-fə-noh; Spanish pronunciation: [ˈweɾfano]) is a county located in the U.S. state of Colorado. As of the 2020 census, the population was 6,820. The county seat is Walsenburg. The county, whose name comes from the Spanish huérfano meaning "orphan", was named for the Huerfano Butte, a local landmark. The area of Huerfano County boomed early in the 1900s with the discovery of large coal deposits. After large scale World War II coal demand ended in the 1940s Walsenburg and Huerfano saw a steady economic decline through 2015.

== History ==
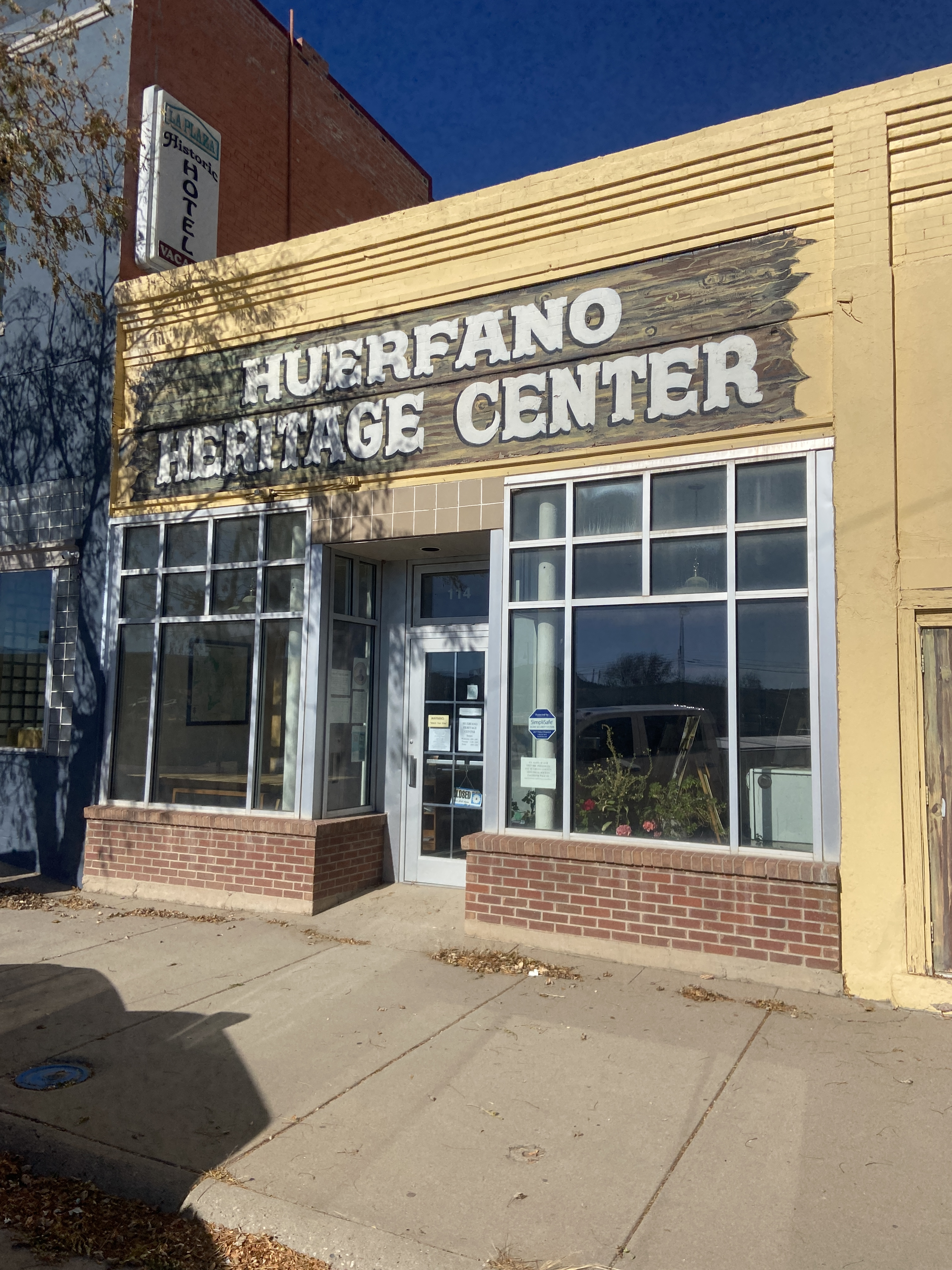
Huerfano Heritage Center in Walsenburg

Huerfano County was one of the original 17 counties created by the Territory of Colorado on November 1, 1861, and was originally larger than its present size. On November 2, 1870, the Colorado General Assembly created Greenwood County from former Cheyenne and Arapaho tribal land and the eastern portion of Huerfano County. There are countless reports of vast New Spain and Native American gold treasures that lay hidden in the hills and mountains of Huerfano County including the Arapahoe Princess Treasure. Two Spanish forts were located in Huerfano County.

=== Colorado Coalfield War ===
Huerfano County and neighboring Las Animas County were the central locations of the 1913-1914 United Mine Workers of America strike against the Rockefeller-owned Colorado Fuel and Iron company, which is now referred to as the Colorado Coalfield War.

Walsenburg and other stops on the Colorado and Southern Railway proved strategically important for both strikers and the Colorado National Guard, resulting in multiple gun-battles in around towns with stops.

== Geography ==
According to the U.S. Census Bureau, the county has a total area of 1,593 square miles (4,130 km^{2}), of which 1,591 square miles (4,120 km^{2}) is land and 2.2 square miles (5.7 km^{2}) (0.1%) is water. The price of property saw an increase of more than 10% after a moratorium on commercial marijuana grows was lifted in July 2015.

=== Adjacent counties ===
- Pueblo County - northeast
- Las Animas County - southeast
- Costilla County - southwest
- Alamosa County - west
- Custer County - northwest
- Saguache County - northwest

=== Major highways ===
- I-25 / US 85 / US 87
  - I-25 BS (Walsenburg)
- US 160
- SH 10
- SH 12
- SH 69

=== Protected areas ===
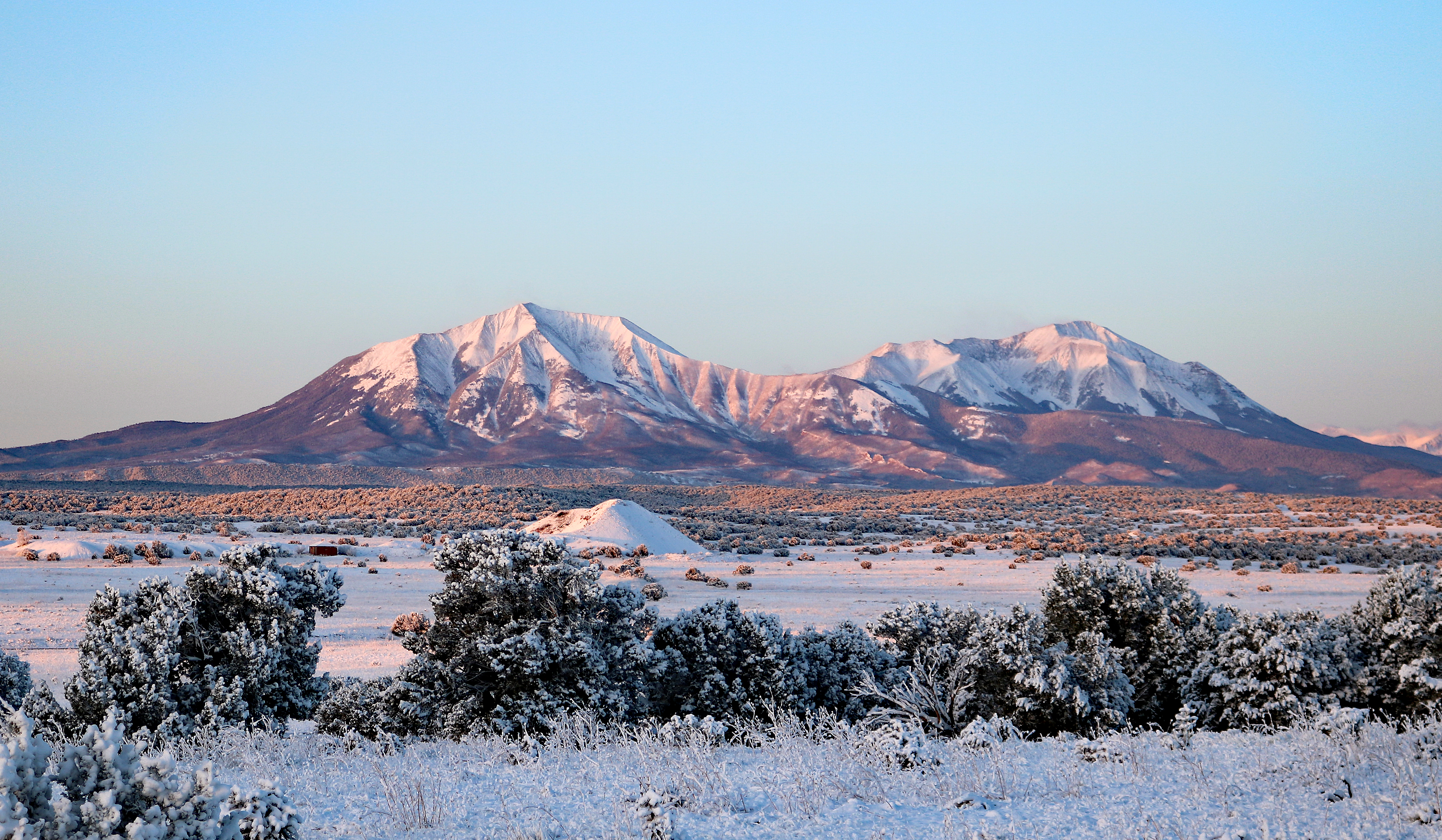
Spanish Peaks at sunrise

- Greenhorn Mountain Wilderness
- Lathrop State Park
- San Isabel National Forest
- Sangre de Cristo Wilderness
- Spanish Peaks Wilderness

=== Scenic byway ===
- Highway of Legends Scenic Byway

== Attractions and recreation ==
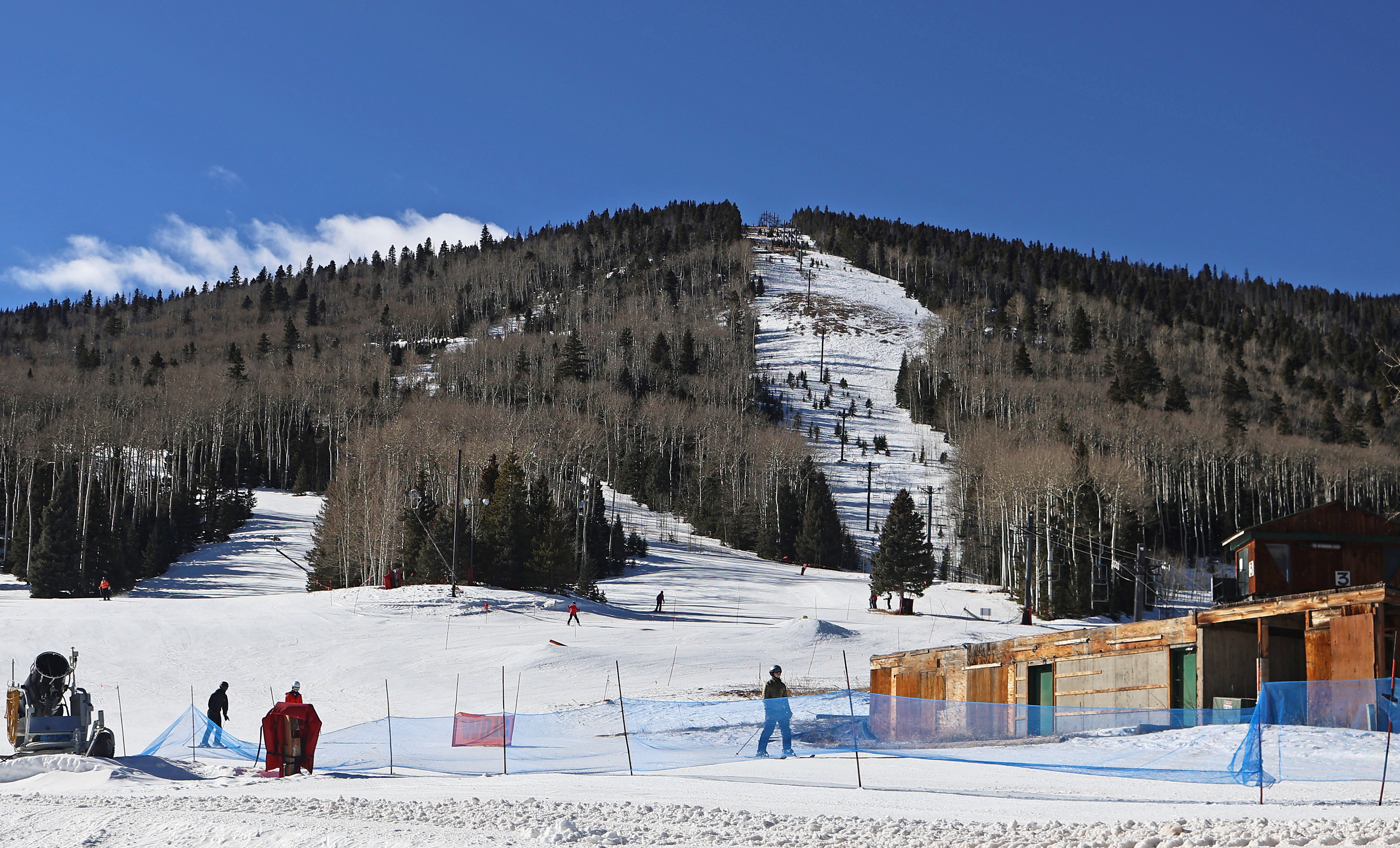
Skiers at Cuchara Mountain Park

The county's tourism board brands the county as "Southern Colorado's Spanish Peaks Country." Visitors are attracted to the Spanish Peaks and the many mountain-related activities they offer, such as mountain climbing, hiking, hunting, and sightseeing. In addition, the western part of the county offers the peaks of the Sangre de Cristo Range, a range that includes several fourteeners.

The towns of La Veta and Cuchara offer art galleries and lodging.

Also in Cuchara, a new county park — the Cuchara Mountain Park — opened in 2017, repurposing property that used to be the former Cuchara Ski Resort. The ski resort had been closed to skiers since 2000, but in the mid-2020s a group of local citizens purchased a 47-acre (19-hectare) parcel of land the old ski resort occupied and formed the non-profit Panadero Ski Corporation. Beginning in 2023, the organization began taking skiers and snowboarders partway up the ski resort's mountain using a snowcat pulling a "ski bus", opening the ski resort for the first time in more than twenty years. Moreover, Panadero Ski Corporation is in the process of repairing one of the old ski lifts at the site, Lift 4, and hopes to open it to visitors soon.

Huerfano County is a geologist's paradise. Over 500 dikes surround the Spanish Peaks. Many other geological formations, such as the Dakota Formation, are visible in the county.

Lathrop State Park offers hiking, camping, picnicking, fishing and 4.5 miles (7.2 kilometers) of mountain bike trails. Adjacent to the park, the city of Walsenburg offers a public, nine-hole golf course.

== Demographics ==
Historical population
Census	Pop.	Note	%±
1870	2,250		—
1880	4,124		83.3%
1890	6,882		66.9%
1900	8,395		22.0%
1910	13,320		58.7%
1920	16,879		26.7%
1930	17,062		1.1%
1940	16,088		−5.7%
1950	10,549		−34.4%
1960	7,867		−25.4%
1970	6,590		−16.2%
1980	6,440		−2.3%
1990	6,009		−6.7%
2000	7,862		30.8%
2010	6,711		−14.6%
2020	6,820		1.6%
2025 (est.)	7,011	▲	2.8%
U.S. Decennial Census; 1790-1960 1900-1990; 1990-2000 2010-2020

=== 2020 census ===
As of the 2020 census, the county had a population of 6,820. Of the residents, 16.1% were under the age of 18 and 31.9% were 65 years of age or older; the median age was 56.0 years. For every 100 females there were 103.9 males, and for every 100 females age 18 and over there were 101.8 males. 0.0% of residents lived in urban areas and 100.0% lived in rural areas.

Huerfano County, Colorado – Racial and ethnic composition Note: the US Census treats Hispanic/Latino as an ethnic category. This table excludes Latinos from the racial categories and assigns them to a separate category. Hispanics/Latinos may be of any race.
Race / Ethnicity (NH = Non-Hispanic)	Pop 2000	Pop 2010	Pop 2020	% 2000	% 2010	% 2020
White alone (NH)	4,590	4,151	4,231	58.38%	61.85%	62.04%
Black or African American alone (NH)	210	22	53	2.67%	0.33%	0.78%
Native American or Alaska Native alone (NH)	106	54	77	1.35%	0.80%	1.13%
Asian alone (NH)	27	19	24	0.34%	0.28%	0.35%
Pacific Islander alone (NH)	5	10	0	0.06%	0.15%	0.00%
Other race alone (NH)	14	8	49	0.18%	0.12%	0.72%
Mixed race or Multiracial (NH)	147	79	256	1.87%	1.18%	3.75%
Hispanic or Latino (any race)	2,763	2,368	2,130	35.14%	35.28%	31.23%
Total	7,862	6,711	6,820	100.00%	100.00%	100.00%

The racial makeup of the county was 73.3% White, 1.0% Black or African American, 2.6% American Indian and Alaska Native, 0.5% Asian, 0.0% Native Hawaiian and Pacific Islander, 7.8% from some other race, and 15.0% from two or more races. Hispanic or Latino residents of any race comprised 31.2% of the population.

There were 3,195 households in the county, of which 19.0% had children under the age of 18 living with them and 26.7% had a female householder with no spouse or partner present. About 35.3% of all households were made up of individuals and 18.5% had someone living alone who was 65 years of age or older.

There were 4,679 housing units, of which 31.7% were vacant. Among occupied housing units, 72.1% were owner-occupied and 27.9% were renter-occupied. The homeowner vacancy rate was 3.4% and the rental vacancy rate was 4.5%.

=== 2000 census ===
As of the census of 2000, there were 7,862 people, 3,082 households, and 1,920 families residing in the county. The population density was 5 people per square mile (1.9 people/km^{2}). There were 4,599 housing units at an average density of 3 units per square mile (1.2 units/km^{2}). The racial makeup of the county was 80.96% White, 2.75% Black or African American, 2.70% Native American, 0.39% Asian, 0.08% Pacific Islander, 9.41% from other races, and 3.71% from two or more races. 35.14% of the population were Hispanic or Latino of any race.

There were 3,082 households, out of which 25.00% had children under the age of 18 living with them, 48.40% were married couples living together, 10.40% had a female householder with no husband present, and 37.70% were non-families. 32.80% of all households were made up of individuals, and 14.10% had someone living alone who was 65 years of age or older. The average household size was 2.25 and the average family size was 2.85.

In the county, the population was spread out, with 20.90% under the age of 18, 7.30% from 18 to 24, 27.40% from 25 to 44, 27.40% from 45 to 64, and 17.00% who were 65 years of age or older. The median age was 42 years. For every 100 females there were 118.80 males. For every 100 females age 18 and over, there were 122.80 males.

The median income for a household in the county was $25,775, and the median income for a family was $32,664. Males had a median income of $24,209 versus $21,048 for females. The per capita income for the county was $15,242. About 14.10% of families and 18.00% of the population were below the poverty line, including 23.70% of those under age 18 and 11.90% of those age 65 or over.

== Politics ==
A Democratic stronghold for much of the 20th century, Huerfano has become a competitive swing county in recent elections. After only backing Al Gore by 29 votes in 2000, the county voted for the winner of each presidential race between 2004 and 2016 before narrowly staying in the Donald Trump column in 2020.

United States presidential election results for Huerfano County, Colorado
Year	Republican		Democratic		Third party(ies)	
Year	No.	%	No.	%	No.	%
1880	466	46.00%	532	52.52%	15	1.48%
1884	435	37.83%	675	58.70%	40	3.48%
1888	750	51.62%	674	46.39%	29	2.00%
1892	750	57.56%	0	0.00%	553	42.44%
1896	929	32.48%	1,929	67.45%	2	0.07%
1900	2,277	68.69%	1,022	30.83%	16	0.48%
1904	2,733	73.69%	958	25.83%	18	0.49%
1908	3,074	78.64%	776	19.85%	59	1.51%
1912	2,814	63.32%	1,277	28.74%	353	7.94%
1916	2,027	42.88%	2,632	55.68%	68	1.44%
1920	2,539	51.42%	2,291	46.40%	108	2.19%
1924	2,784	49.08%	1,219	21.49%	1,669	29.43%
1928	3,260	49.15%	3,343	50.40%	30	0.45%
1932	2,490	36.92%	4,159	61.67%	95	1.41%
1936	2,299	32.22%	4,793	67.17%	44	0.62%
1940	2,738	40.65%	3,974	59.00%	24	0.36%
1944	2,119	39.05%	3,290	60.62%	18	0.33%
1948	1,841	34.03%	3,448	63.73%	121	2.24%
1952	2,178	43.84%	2,773	55.82%	17	0.34%
1956	2,091	47.90%	2,262	51.82%	12	0.27%
1960	1,367	33.73%	2,673	65.95%	13	0.32%
1964	895	24.63%	2,734	75.23%	5	0.14%
1968	1,133	35.14%	1,934	59.99%	157	4.87%
1972	1,620	53.52%	1,341	44.30%	66	2.18%
1976	1,182	37.35%	1,932	61.04%	51	1.61%
1980	1,258	41.49%	1,574	51.91%	200	6.60%
1984	1,581	49.04%	1,602	49.69%	41	1.27%
1988	1,079	36.32%	1,876	63.14%	16	0.54%
1992	685	29.62%	1,224	52.92%	404	17.47%
1996	996	35.88%	1,483	53.42%	297	10.70%
2000	1,466	46.19%	1,495	47.10%	213	6.71%
2004	1,701	50.09%	1,656	48.76%	39	1.15%
2008	1,580	43.37%	1,989	54.60%	74	2.03%
2012	1,646	44.21%	1,953	52.46%	124	3.33%
2016	1,883	49.78%	1,633	43.17%	267	7.06%
2020	2,203	50.00%	2,076	47.12%	127	2.88%
2024	2,346	52.81%	1,965	44.24%	131	2.95%

United States Senate election results for Huerfano County, Colorado2
Year	Republican		Democratic		Third party(ies)	
Year	No.	%	No.	%	No.	%
2020	2,160	49.42%	2,077	47.52%	134	3.07%

United States Senate election results for Huerfano County, Colorado3
Year	Republican		Democratic		Third party(ies)	
Year	No.	%	No.	%	No.	%
2022	1,705	44.29%	2,011	52.23%	134	3.48%

Colorado Gubernatorial election results for Huerfano County
Year	Republican		Democratic		Third party(ies)	
Year	No.	%	No.	%	No.	%
2022	1,656	42.91%	2,102	54.47%	101	2.62%

=== City ===
- Walsenburg

=== Town ===
- La Veta

=== Census-designated places ===
- Cuchara
- Gardner

=== Unincorporated communities ===
- Badito
- Chama
- Farisita
- Farista
- Navajo Ranch
- Red Wing

=== Ghost towns ===
- Alamo
- Calumet
- Delcarbon
- Tioga

== Education ==
There are two school districts that cover sections of the county: Huerfano School District RE-1 and La Veta School District RE-2.

== See also ==
- Bibliography of Colorado
- Geography of Colorado
- History of Colorado
  - National Register of Historic Places listings in Huerfano County, Colorado
- Index of Colorado-related articles
- List of Colorado-related lists
  - List of counties in Colorado
- Outline of Colorado
