= National Register of Historic Places listings in southeast Denver =

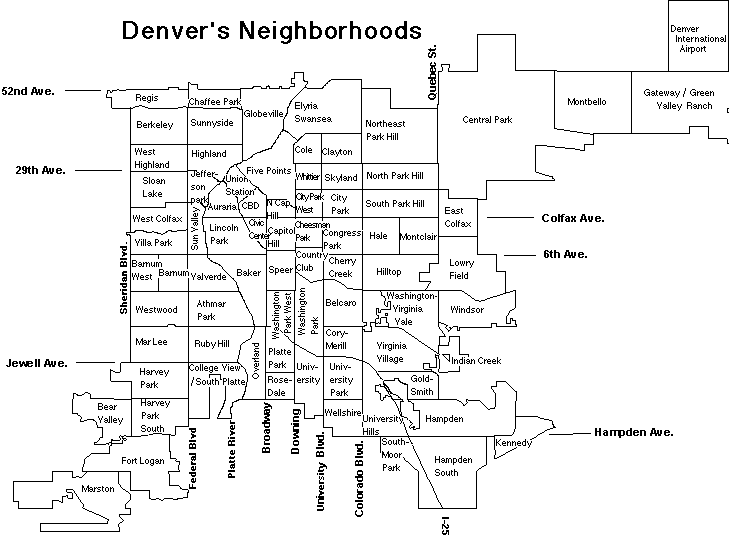
The 78 official neighborhoods of the City and County of Denver.

This is a list of the National Register of Historic Places listings in Southeast Denver, Colorado.

This is intended to be a complete list of the properties and districts on the National Register of Historic Places in southeastern Denver, Colorado, United States. Southeast Denver is defined as being all of the city east of the South Platte River and south of Sixth Avenue. The locations of National Register properties and districts may be seen in an online map.

There are 317 properties and districts listed on the National Register in Denver. Southeast Denver includes 49 of these properties and districts, including 3 that extend into other regions; the city's remaining properties and districts are listed elsewhere. Another 2 properties in Southeast Denver were once listed but have been removed.

This National Park Service list is complete through NPS recent listings posted August 28, 2026.

== Current listings ==
	Name on the Register	Image	Date listed	Location	Neighborhood	Description
1	Alamo Placita Park	Alamo Placita Park	September 17, 1986 (#86002242)	Roughly bounded by Speer Boulevard, 1st Ave., and Clarkson St. 39°43′14″N 104°58′30″W	Speer	
2	Belcaro	Belcaro	February 10, 1975 (#75000505)	3400 Belcaro Dr. 39°42′04″N 104°56′49″W	Belcaro	
3	Buchtel Bungalow	Buchtel Bungalow	November 3, 1988 (#88002383)	2100 S. Columbine St. 39°40′42″N 104°57′20″W	University Park	
4	Chamberlin Observatory	Chamberlin Observatory	March 27, 1980 (#80000887)	2930 E. Warren Ave. 39°40′32″N 104°57′09″W	University Park	
5	Chapel No. 1	Chapel No. 1	May 6, 1982 (#82002292)	Reeves St. on Lowry Air Force Base; 39°43′16″N 104°54′04″W	Lowry Field	
6	Cheesman Park Duplex	Cheesman Park Duplex	May 5, 1983 (#83001306)	1372 S. Pennsylvania St. 39°41′32″N 104°58′50″W	Platt Park	
7	Cheesman Park Esplanade	Cheesman Park Esplanade	September 17, 1986 (#86002218)	Roughly bounded by 8th Ave., High St., the 7th Ave. Parkway, and Williams St. 39°43′42″N 104°57′53″W	Country Club	
8	Clermont Street Parkway	Clermont Street Parkway	September 17, 1986 (#86002215)	Clermont St. Parkway from E. 3rd Ave. to E. 6th Ave. 39°43′23″N 104°56′03″W	Hilltop	
9	Country Club Historic District	Country Club Historic District	July 10, 1979 (#79000579)	Roughly bounded by 1st and 4th Aves., Race and Downing Sts.; also between Downing and University, E. 4th Ave. and north of Alameda Ave. 39°43′13″N 104°58′05″W	Country Club	Second set of addresses represents a boundary increase
10	Cranmer House	Cranmer House	July 27, 2005 (#05000732)	200 Cherry St. 39°43′11″N 104°55′59″W	Hilltop	
11	Cranmer Park	Cranmer Park	September 17, 1986 (#86002216)	Roughly bounded by E. 3rd Ave., Cherry St., E. 1st Ave., and Bellaire St. 39°43′10″N 104°56′06″W	Hilltop	
12	Denver Veterans Administration Medical Center	Denver Veterans Administration Medical Center	March 10, 2025 (#100011504)	1055 North Clermont Street; 39°43′54″N 104°56′11″W		
13	John and Elivera Doud House	John and Elivera Doud House	September 28, 2005 (#05001087)	750 Lafayette St. 39°43′49″N 104°58′13″W	Country Club	
14	Downing Street Parkway	Downing Street Parkway	September 17, 1986 (#86002228)	Downing St. Parkway from E. Bayaud Ave. to E. 3rd Ave. 39°43′03″N 104°58′20″W	Speer	
15	East Fourth Avenue Parkway	East Fourth Avenue Parkway	September 17, 1986 (#86002226)	E. 4th Ave. Parkway from Gilpin St. to Williams St. 39°43′19″N 104°57′57″W	Country Club	
16	East Sixth Avenue Parkway	East Sixth Avenue Parkway	September 17, 1986 (#86002214)	E. 6th Ave. Parkway from Colorado Boulevard to Quebec St. 39°43′07″N 104°55′38″W	Hilltop	Extends into Hale and Montclair in Northeast Denver
17	Eleventh Avenue Hotel	Eleventh Avenue Hotel	July 22, 2021 (#100006741)	1112 Broadway St. 39°44′02″N 104°59′14″W	Capitol Hill	
18	Evans Memorial Chapel	Evans Memorial Chapel	December 27, 1974 (#74000567)	University of Denver campus 39°40′36″N 104°57′46″W	University	
19	Eugene Field House	Eugene Field House	November 1, 1974 (#74000568)	715 S. Franklin St. 39°42′13″N 104°58′07″W	Washington Park	
20	First Avenue Hotel	First Avenue Hotel	November 23, 2020 (#100005800)	101 North Broadway; 39°43′07″N 104°59′15″W		
21	Fitzroy Place	Fitzroy Place	February 20, 1975 (#75000508)	2160 S. Cook St. 39°40′39″N 104°56′47″W	University Park	
22	Four-Mile House	Four-Mile House	December 3, 1969 (#69000042)	715 S. Forest St. 39°42′11″N 104°55′36″W	Washington Virginia Vale	
23	Casper Forman and Nancy Lee Hegner House	Casper Forman and Nancy Lee Hegner House	June 30, 2023 (#100009119)	2323 East Dakota Ave. 39°42′33″N 104°57′35″W	Washington Park	
24	Hungarian Freedom Park	Hungarian Freedom Park	September 17, 1986 (#86002244)	Roughly bounded by Speer Boulevard, 1st Ave., and Clarkson St. 39°43′07″N 104°58′32″W	Speer	
25	Iliff Hall	Iliff Hall	April 19, 2006 (#06000314)	2201 S. University Boulevard; 39°40′34″N 104°57′37″W	University	At Iliff School of Theology
26	Lloyd M. Joshel House	Lloyd M. Joshel House	December 28, 1995 (#95001456)	220 S. Dahlia St. 39°42′45″N 104°55′51″W	Hilltop	
27	Kerr House	Kerr House	February 28, 2002 (#02000125)	1900 E. 7th Ave. Parkway; 39°43′37″N 104°57′50″W	Country Club	
28	Kohn House	Kohn House	July 27, 2005 (#05000733)	770 High St. 39°43′43″N 104°57′50″W	Country Club	
29	Leeman Auto Company Building	Leeman Auto Company Building	September 27, 2001 (#01001054)	550 Broadway; 39°43′31″N 104°59′11″W	Speer	
30	Lowry Field Brick Barracks	Lowry Field Brick Barracks	September 3, 1998 (#98001076)	200 N. Rampart Way; 39°43′19″N 104°53′55″W	Lowry Field	
31	Monaco Street Parkway	Monaco Street Parkway	September 17, 1986 (#86002207)	Monaco St. Parkway from E. 1st Ave. to Montview Boulevard; 39°43′58″N 104°54′43″W	Hilltop	Extends into Montclair and South Park Hill in Northeast Denver
32	Nordlund House	Nordlund House	February 12, 1998 (#98000081)	330 Birch St. 39°43′18″N 104°56′08″W	Hilltop	
33	Norman Apartments	Norman Apartments	December 22, 1983 (#83003509)	99 S. Downing St. 39°42′54″N 104°58′24″W	Speer	
34	Nurses' Home	Nurses' Home	January 22, 2024 (#100009567)	871 N Bellaire St; 39°43′51″N 104°56′13″W		
35	Photography and Armament School Buildings, Lowry Air Force Base	Photography and Armament School Buildings, Lowry Air Force Base	April 2, 2002 (#02000288)	125 and 130 Rampart Way and 7600 E. 1st Place; 39°43′13″N 104°53′53″W	Lowry Field	
36	Ross-Broadway Branch, Denver Public Library	Ross-Broadway Branch, Denver Public Library	December 23, 2016 (#100000655)	33 E. Bayaud Ave. 39°42′53″N 104°59′12″W	Baker	
37	Henry Roth House	Henry Roth House	September 30, 1997 (#97001192)	5, 7, and 9 S. Fox St. 39°43′00″N 104°59′42″W	Baker	
38	Saint Thomas Theological Seminary	Saint Thomas Theological Seminary	July 27, 1989 (#89001007)	1300 S. Steele; 39°41′35″N 104°56′50″W	Cory-Merrill	
39	Sixth Avenue Community Church	Sixth Avenue Community Church	December 17, 2010 (#10001037)	3250 E. Sixth Ave. 39°43′31″N 104°56′56″W	Cherry Creek	
40	Smith's Irrigation Ditch	Smith's Irrigation Ditch	October 8, 1976 (#76000555)	Washington Park; 39°42′01″N 104°58′13″W	Washington Park	
41	South High School	South High School	December 14, 2022 (#100008460)	1700 East Louisiana Ave. 39°41′32″N 104°57′57″W	Washington Park	
42	South Marion Street Parkway	South Marion Street Parkway	September 17, 1986 (#86002239)	S. Marion St. Parkway from E. Virginia Ave. to E. Bayaud Ave. at Downing St. 39°42′42″N 104°58′19″W	Washington Park	
43	South Side-Baker Historic District	South Side-Baker Historic District	October 3, 1985 (#85002932)	Roughly bounded by W. 5th Ave., Broadway, W. Alameda Ave., and W. Fox St. 39°43′05″N 104°59′26″W	Baker	
44	Speer Boulevard	Speer Boulevard	September 17, 1986 (#86002240)	Speer Boulevard from W. Colfax Ave. to Downing St. 39°43′42″N 104°59′09″W	Speer	Extends into Civic Center in Downtown Denver and Lincoln Park in Northeast Denver
45	Temple Emanuel	Temple Emanuel	May 19, 2003 (#03000403)	51 Grape St. 39°43′00″N 104°55′30″W	Hilltop	
46	University Boulevard	University Boulevard	September 17, 1986 (#86002237)	University Boulevard from E. Iowa Ave. to E. Alameda Ave. 39°41′57″N 104°57′31″W	Belcaro, Cory-Merrill, and Washington Park	
47	Washington Park	Washington Park	September 17, 1986 (#86002238)	Roughly bounded by E. Virginia Ave., S. Franklin St., E. Louisiana Ave., and S. Downing St. 39°42′00″N 104°58′13″W	Washington Park	Includes both the park and the neighborhood built around it
48	Weckbaugh House	Weckbaugh House	January 16, 1984 (#84000826)	1701 E. Cedar Ave. 39°42′42″N 104°57′59″W	Washington Park	
49	Williams Street Parkway	Williams Street Parkway	September 17, 1986 (#86002222)	Williams St. Parkway from E. 4th Ave. to E. 8th Ave. 39°43′45″N 104°57′54″W	Country Club	

== Former listings ==
	Name on the Register	Image	Date listed	Date removed	Location	Description
1	Broadway Bridge	Broadway Bridge	February 4, 1985 (#85000203)	February 7, 1995	Broadway Ave.	Demolished in Spring 1988.
2	David H. Moffatt House		June 28, 1971 (#71001082)	1972	808 Grant St.	Demolished in March 1972

== See also ==
- List of National Register of Historic Places in Colorado
- List of National Register of Historic Places in Denver
- List of National Register of Historic Places in downtown Denver
- List of National Register of Historic Places in northeast Denver
- List of National Register of Historic Places in west Denver
- List of National Historic Landmarks in Colorado
- Bibliography of Colorado
- Geography of Colorado
- History of Colorado
- Index of Colorado-related articles
- List of Colorado-related lists
- Outline of Colorado
