= Cranmer =

Cranmer is an English surname.

Notable people with the surname include:

- Barbara Cranmer (1959/60–2019), Canadian First Nation documentary filmmaker
- Bob Cranmer (born 1956), American politician from Pittsburgh, Pennsylvania
- Craig Cranmer (born 1968), Scottish footballer
- Dave Cranmer (born 1944), Canadian football player
- Doug Cranmer (1927–2006), Canadian carver, artist and First Nation chief
- Emma Amelia Cranmer (1858–1937), American reformer, suffragist, writer
- Kyle Cranmer (born 1977), American particle physicist
- Margarete Cranmer (died c.1571), second wife of Thomas Cranmer
- Michael Cranmer (born 1989), South Australian cricketer
- Paul Cranmer (born 1969), Canadian football player
- Peter Cranmer (1914–1994), English cricketer and rugby union player
- Philip Cranmer (1918–2006), English teacher of and composer of classical music
- Scotty Cranmer (born 1987), American BMX rider
- Steffen Cranmer (born 1934), British sports shooter
- Thomas Cranmer (1489–1556), leader of the English Reformation and Archbishop of Canterbury during the reigns of Henry VIII and Edward VI

Other notable people:

- Francis Cranmer Penrose (1817–1903), British architect, archaeologist, and astronomer
- Martha Cranmer Oliver (1834–1880), English actress

== See also ==
- Cranmer Bank, area of Moortown, Leeds, England
- Cranmer House (disambiguation)
- Cranmer Park, Denver, Colorado
