= Watkins Stained Glass Studio =

Watkins Stained Glass studio
- Industry: Design
- Founder: Clarence Watkins
- Owner: Phillip & Jane Watkins

Watkins Stained Glass Studio is a family-owned business that produces stained-glass art in Colorado.

== History ==
Watkins Stained Glass Studio was founded as Clarence Watkins arrived in America. He came from a family of glass artists that stretches back from 17th century England. Clarence settled in Denver and started offering his services to churches, houses and mansions.

Watkins Glass Studio was added to Colorado's business directory in 1881. An estimated 70 percent of traditional stained glass art throughout churches, museums, mausoleums, bungalows, mansions and businesses in Denver are created and restored by the studio.

== Selected works ==
- Molly Brown House Museum
- Castle Marne
- Phipps Mansion
- Colorado Convention Center
- Brown Palace Hotel
- Fairmount Cemetery
