= Pesman =

Pesman is a surname. Notable people with the surname include:

- Jacob Pesman (1888–1950), Dutch military officer
- Jan Pesman (1931–2014), Dutch speed skater
- Michiel Pesman (1887–1962), American engineer, writer, and landscape architect
- Ros Pesman (born 1938), Australian historian
