= Michiel Pesman =

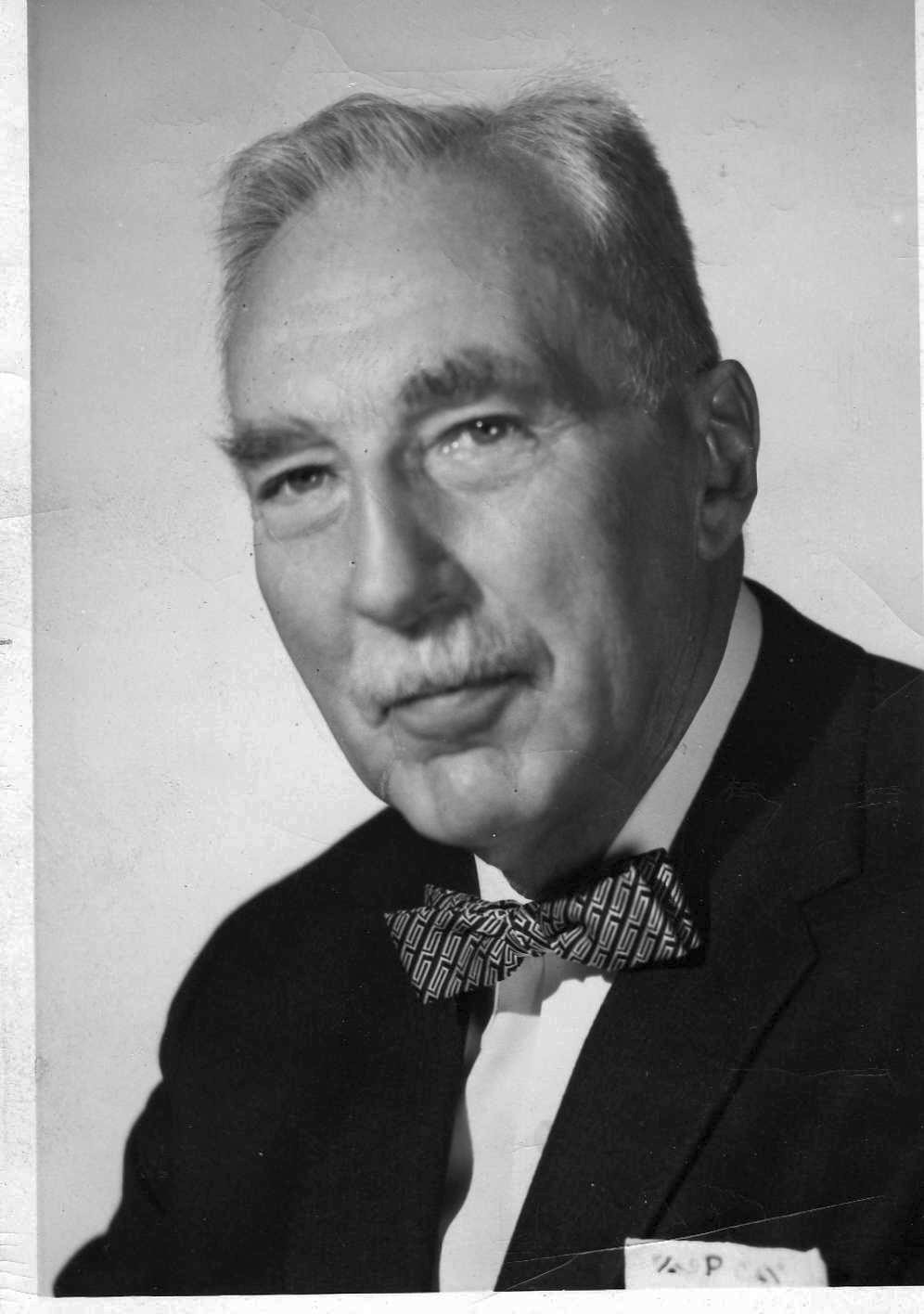
Pesman in 1962

M. Walter Pesman (Thesinge, May 28, 1887 – Denver, September 1962) was an American engineer, writer and landscape architect.

== Early life ==
Pesman was the youngest of seven children born on May 28, 1887, in Thesinge, a small farming village near Groningen, Netherlands. At age eighteen he was diagnosed with tuberculosis and was forced to stay in bed and be overfed for a year, the only cure known at the time. After being pronounced well, he was urged to leave the damp climate, so he followed the lead of his two elder siblings and their spouses, moving to the Western part of the United States to settle in Colorado.

== Development years ==
Because of his excellent schooling in high school, he entered Colorado Agricultural and Mechanics College (now Colorado State University) as a junior in 1908, majored in Botany, and graduated in 1910 with a degree in Landscape Architecture. Since most Americans could not pronounce Michiel correctly, he changed his name to M. Walter when he was naturalized. His first position was with the Chamberlain Landscaping Company in Denver. In 1917 he was made secretary of the Denver Society for Ornamental Horticulture. In 1919, he joined with another Dutchman, Saco Rienk DeBoer Saco Rienk DeBoer who had a Denver landscape architecture firm. During this partnership, he earned a reputation for excellent landscape projects; beautifying both sides of Cherry Creek in Denver, landscaping the prestigious residence of J.J. Hall on Montview Blvd. Pesman and DeBoer also planned the South Denver subdivision Bonnie Brae which incorporated the used of curved streets for the first time.

== Accomplishments ==
In 1924, ending the partnership with DeBoer, he started his own consulting firm out of his home at 372 S. Humboldt St., Denver. He took over the contract with the Denver Public School System, where he designed landscape plans for seventy schools. For Bryant Webster, he used a southwest theme because of the Indian symbols and designs for the building. Lake Junior High School was one of the most beautiful. Situated on a hillside on the shore of West Denver Sloan's Lake and oriented toward a mountain view, the landscape complimented the beautiful building. In 1930, with the help of George Kelly, he developed a garden for the historic Central City Opera House. Starting in 1933, he became the landscape architect for the State Highway Department of Colorado where he beautified many of the highways throughout the state. Earlier he had written his views on highway planning. Among these highways was the deep canyon road leading west to Glenwood Springs. Unfortunately, development of the interstate system destroyed most of his work. Another was the original entrance to Boulder via East Arapahoe Street. Although the rose bushes remain, the road is seldom used because the Denver-Boulder Turnpike bypasses it. After his contract with the state was completed, he designed the Memorial Park at Crown Hill Cemetery, with various themes, including Greek columns, chimes, a fountain, and one of the earliest sprinkler systems. Other projects were Las Casitas, a low-cost housing area and the Cherry Creek Apartments on Downing Street. Many private residences benefited from his expertise including the Joshel House, for which he designed a since-partially implemented landscape plan. In 1940, he landscaped the Country Club Gardens, a large apartment project in Denver with a series of outdoor gardens, creating the illusion that the buildings were placed in a park. He was a city planner as well and worked with Colorado Springs planning. In 1943, he was President of the Colorado State Forestry Association, which later became the Colorado Forestry and Horticulture Association, serving as its first president and member of the Board of Directors. He helped to found the Denver Botanic Gardens and contributed many articles to their publication, the Green Thumb; some were published posthumously. He was a member of the City Club in Denver and president for one year. As a member of the Ben Franklin Club, he presented many papers at their meetings. He taught classes at Colorado State University as well as extension courses for the University of Colorado and the University of Denver. He spoke often at garden club meetings throughout the state. An accomplished linguist, he continued speaking his native Dutch as well as French, German, and Italian. Toward the end of his life, he studied Russian. Because of his interest in Mexican wildflowers, he learned Spanish to converse with botanists and campesinos of Mexico.

Pesman was considered important in the development of Colorado in the 20th Century, being one of the 149 professionals whose biographies appear in "Shaping the American Landscape". In addition to his other activities, he was an amateur botanist. In his first book on native flora of Colorado, "Meet the Natives", he developed an innovative idea of grouping by flower colors in each of the five life zones, and in each season of blooming. It was first published in 1942. The book was willed to the Denver Botanic Gardens and is now in a 2012 edition.

His second book on the native flora of Mexico, "Meet Flora Mexicana", was published in 1961. He used the same innovative techniques for plant identification as he did in the first book. He was given an honorary membership in the Sociedad Botanica del Estado de Jalisco during his research on this book. In 1958, at the fifteenth International Horticultural Conference in Nice, France, he presented a paper and gave out packets of Colorado's native plant, the columbine, to attendees.

Two trails are named in his honor. One is on Mt. Goliath, just below Mount Blue Sky, Colorado. The Denver Botanic Gardens named it the M. Walter Pesman Alpine Nature Trail. A similar one is just outside Grand Junction.

== Close of life ==
Pesman died of cancer in September 1962. Ever the free thinker, he had written his own obituary entitled “Future Address from M. Walter Pesman”. In the obituary, he thanked all of his friends and relatives, writing, “This last chapter of my life should be like the final act of a good play. When the curtain falls the whole play it is then appreciated. It is my hope that something of my life will have been of benefit to individuals and to the general well-being. Will you forget that this is a farewell and keep your memories fresh with all the wonderful times we have had together?” In January 1963, the Colorado Nurseryman's Association chose him as "Man of the Year", posthumously. In 1995, the Green Thumb published an extensive article about his life and accomplishments. In 2012, his book was republished which includes photographs of every flower in Colorado.
