= Lowry, Denver (disambiguation) =

Lowry, Denver is a neighborhood of Denver, Colorado, United States.

Lowry, Denver may also refer to various locations in/near the area:

- Lowry Air Force Base, the last designation of the military installation which spanned an area within the neighborhood
  - Lowry Field, the 1938–1948 installation
- Lowry Bombing and Gunnery Range, the nearby area used for World War II and Cold War ordnance drops/firing
- Lowry Campus, the academic area of the former Air Force Base, now part of Community College of Aurora
- Lowry Field Number 2, an auxiliary field near Lowry Field, also called Buckley Field
