= Cranmer House =

Cranmer House may refer to:

- Cranmer House (Denver, Colorado), listed on the National Register of Historic Places (NRHP)
- Cranmer Theological House, the seminary of the Reformed Episcopal Church's Diocese of Mid-America

== See also ==
- Cranmer Park, Denver, Colorado, NRHP-listed
