= Ureterp =

Ureterp Oerterp
- Village
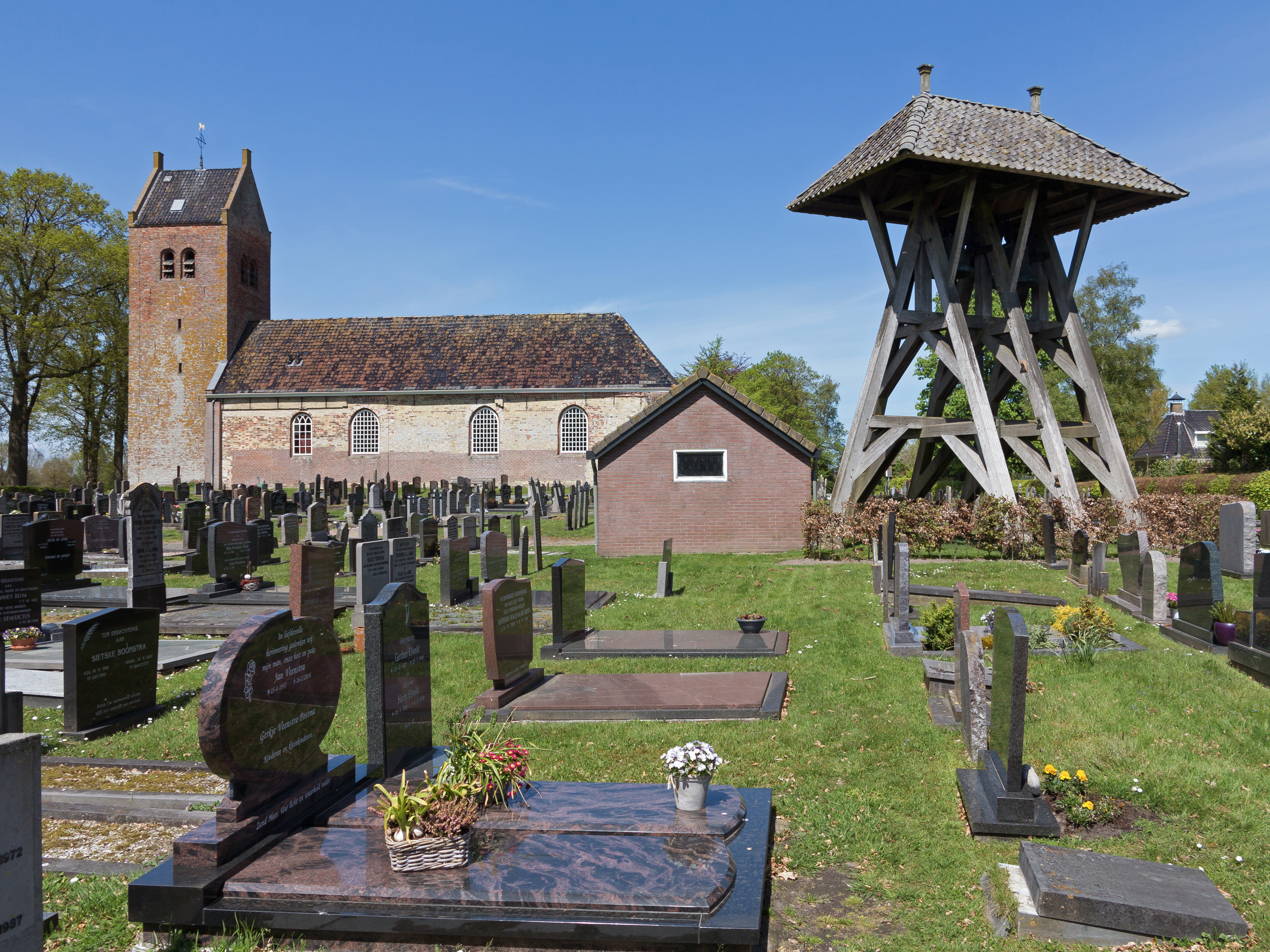
- St Peter's church

- Coat of arms

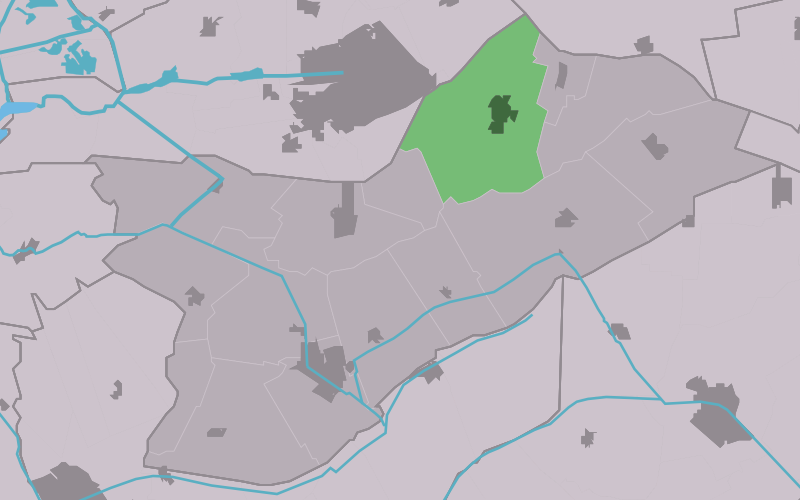
- Location in Opsterland municipality

- Location in the Netherlands Ureterp (Netherlands)
- Country: Netherlands
- Province: Friesland
- Municipality: Opsterland

Area
  - Total: 26.24 km^{2} (10.13 sq mi)
- Elevation: 5 m (16 ft)

Population (2021)
  - Total: 4,860
  - Density: 185/km^{2} (480/sq mi)
- Time zone: UTC+1 (CET)
  - Summer (DST): UTC+2 (CEST)
- Postal code: 9247
- Dialing code: 0512
- Website: Official

Ureterp (West Frisian: Oerterp) is a village in the municipality of Opsterland in the east of Friesland, the Netherlands. After Gorredijk it is the second largest village of the municipality with a population of around 4,785 in January 2017.

== History ==
The village was first mentioned in 1315 as Urathorp, and means "higher settlement". Ura (higher) has been added to distinguish from Olterterp. Ureterp developed in the late middle ages on a sandy ridge. In the 17th century, a second settlement developed at the sluice of the Drachtster Compagnonsvaart. The tower and the north face of Dutch Reformed church are from the 13th century. The church was extensively modified around 1800.

Ureterp was home to 1,512 people in 1840.

== Notable people ==
- Lieuwe de Boer (born 1951), ice speed skater
- Saco Rienk de Boer (1883–1974), landscape architect and city planner
- Grietje Mulder (born 1966), long track speed skater
- Alyda Norbruis (born 1989), Paralympic cyclist
- Jelle Wagenaar (born 1989), footballer

== Gallery ==
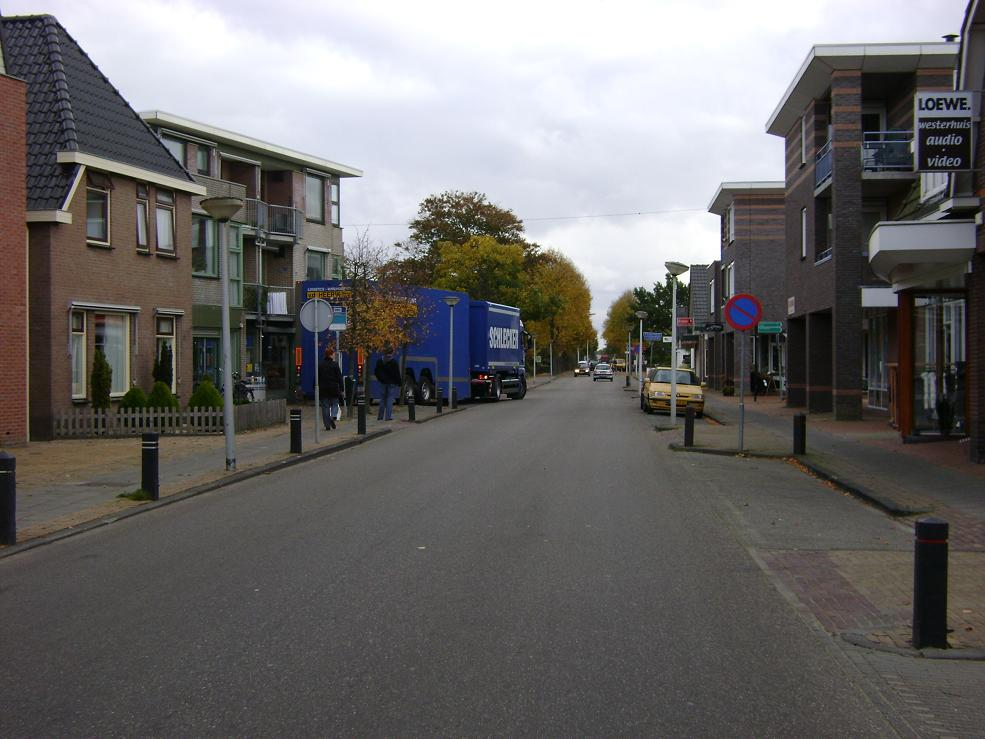
Street of Ureterp

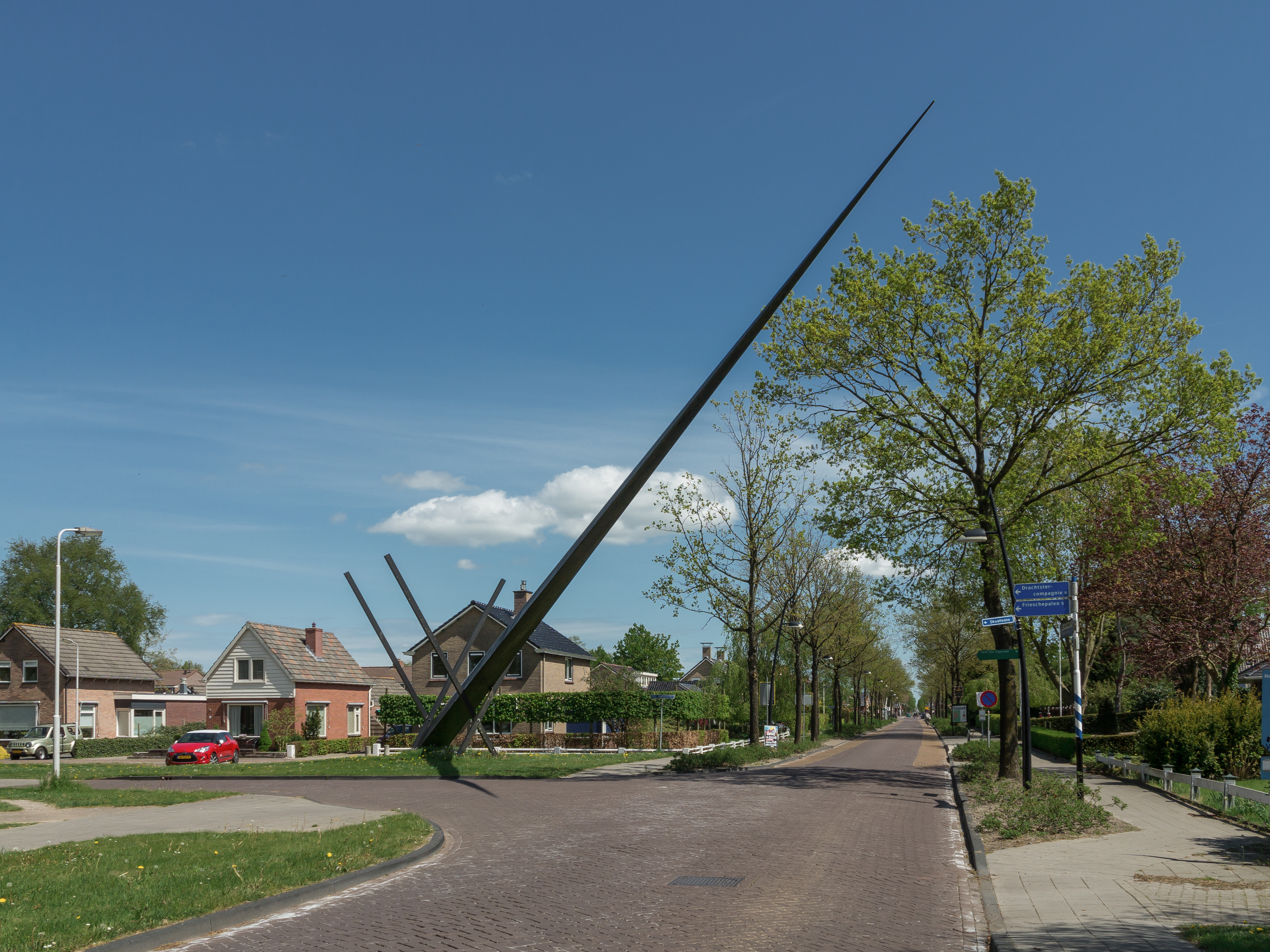
Modern art in the street

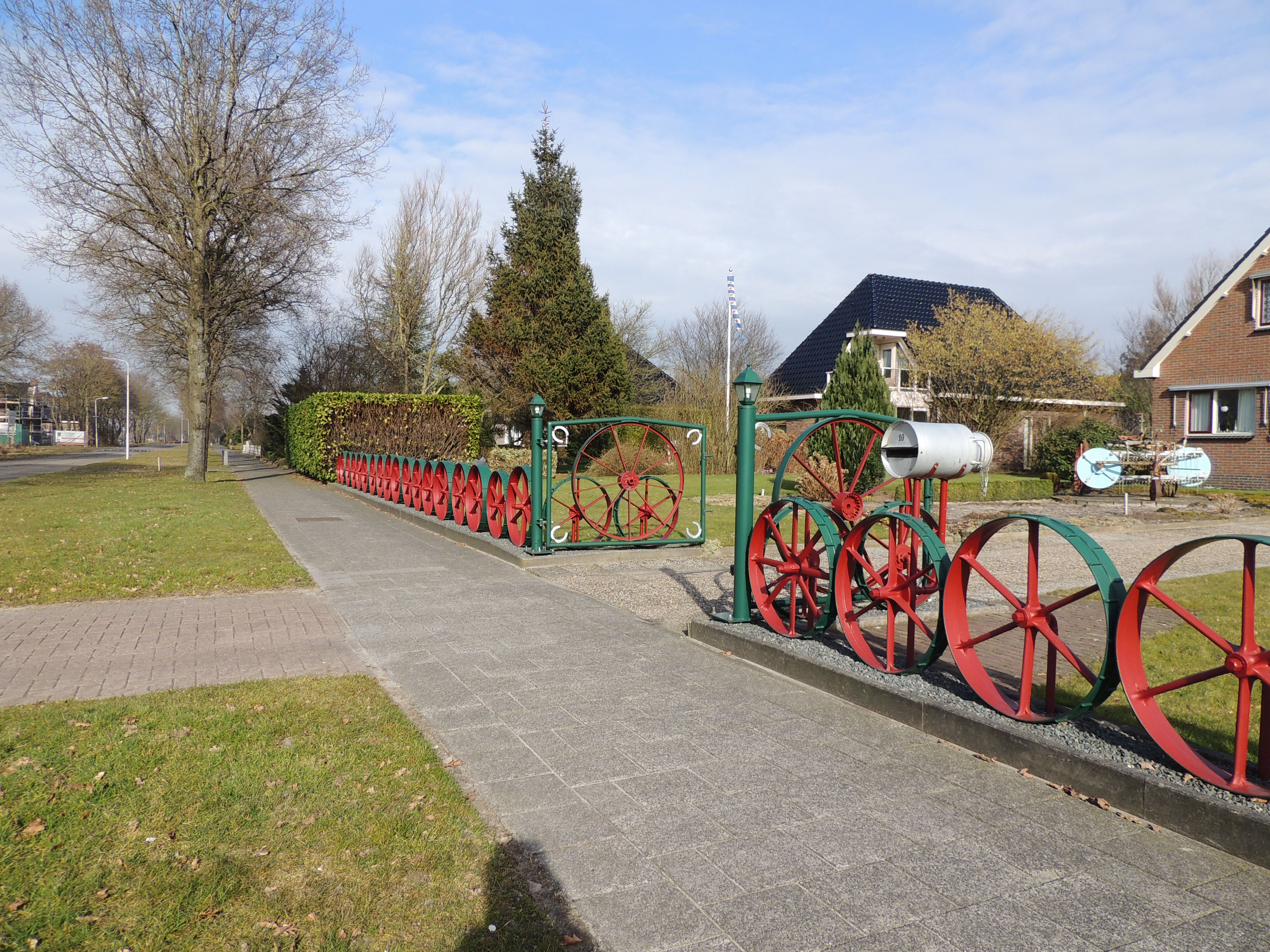
Fantasy gate

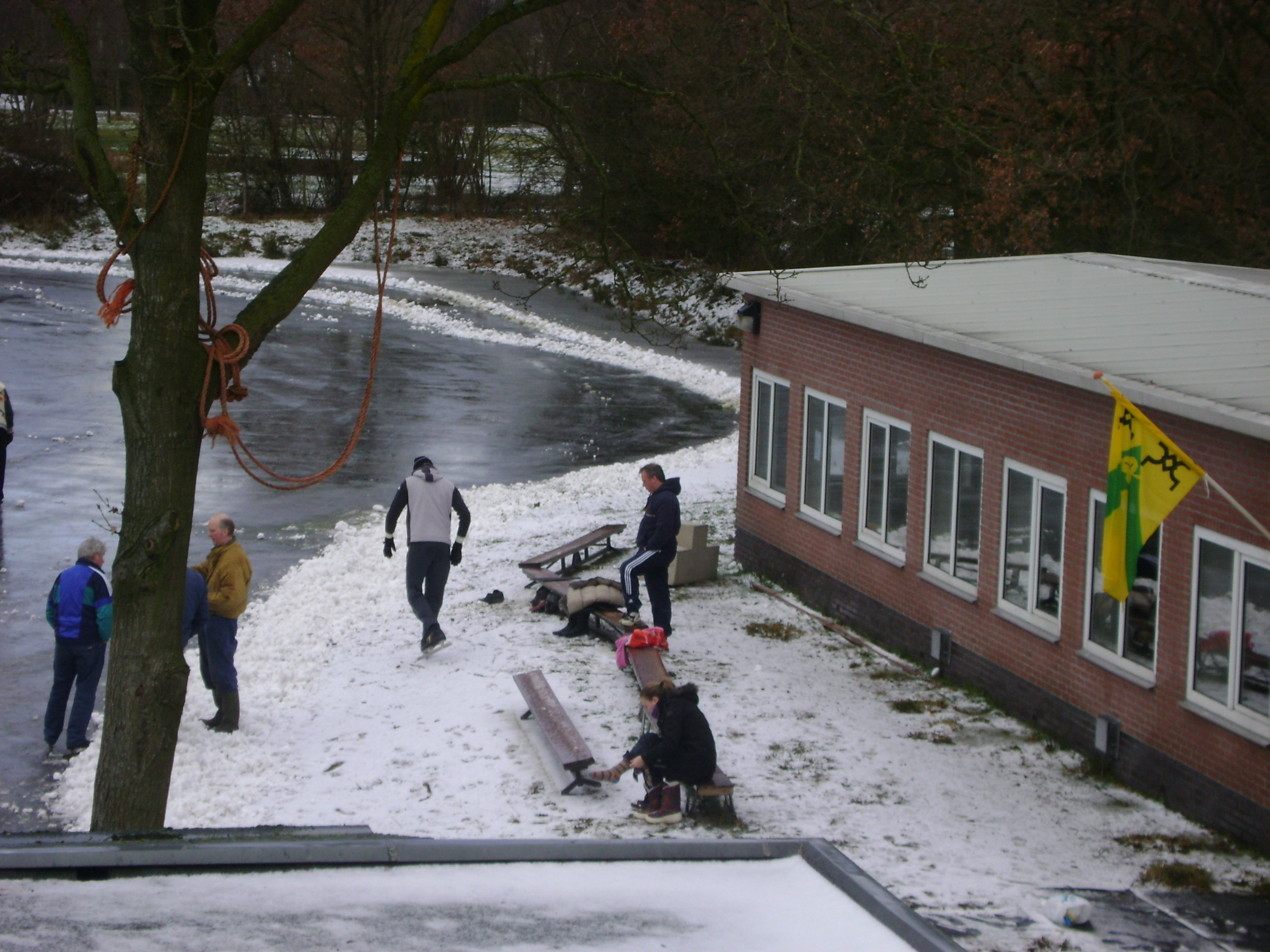
Skating in Ureterp
