= Jelle Wagenaar =

Dutch footballer

Personal information
- Full name: Jelle Wagenaar
- Date of birth: 30 August 1989 (age 37)
- Place of birth: Ureterp, Netherlands
- Height: 1.70 m (5 ft 7 in)
- Position: Left back

Youth career
- Drachtster Boys
- FC Groningen

Senior career*
Years	Team	Apps	(Gls)
2011–2013	SC Veendam	42	(0)
- * Club domestic league appearances and goals as of 19 August 2012 (UTC)

Jelle Wagenaar (born 30 August 1989 in Ureterp) is a Dutch professional footballer who plays as a defender and who is currently without a club. He formerly played for SC Veendam.
