= Speer Boulevard =

- U.S. National Register of Historic Places
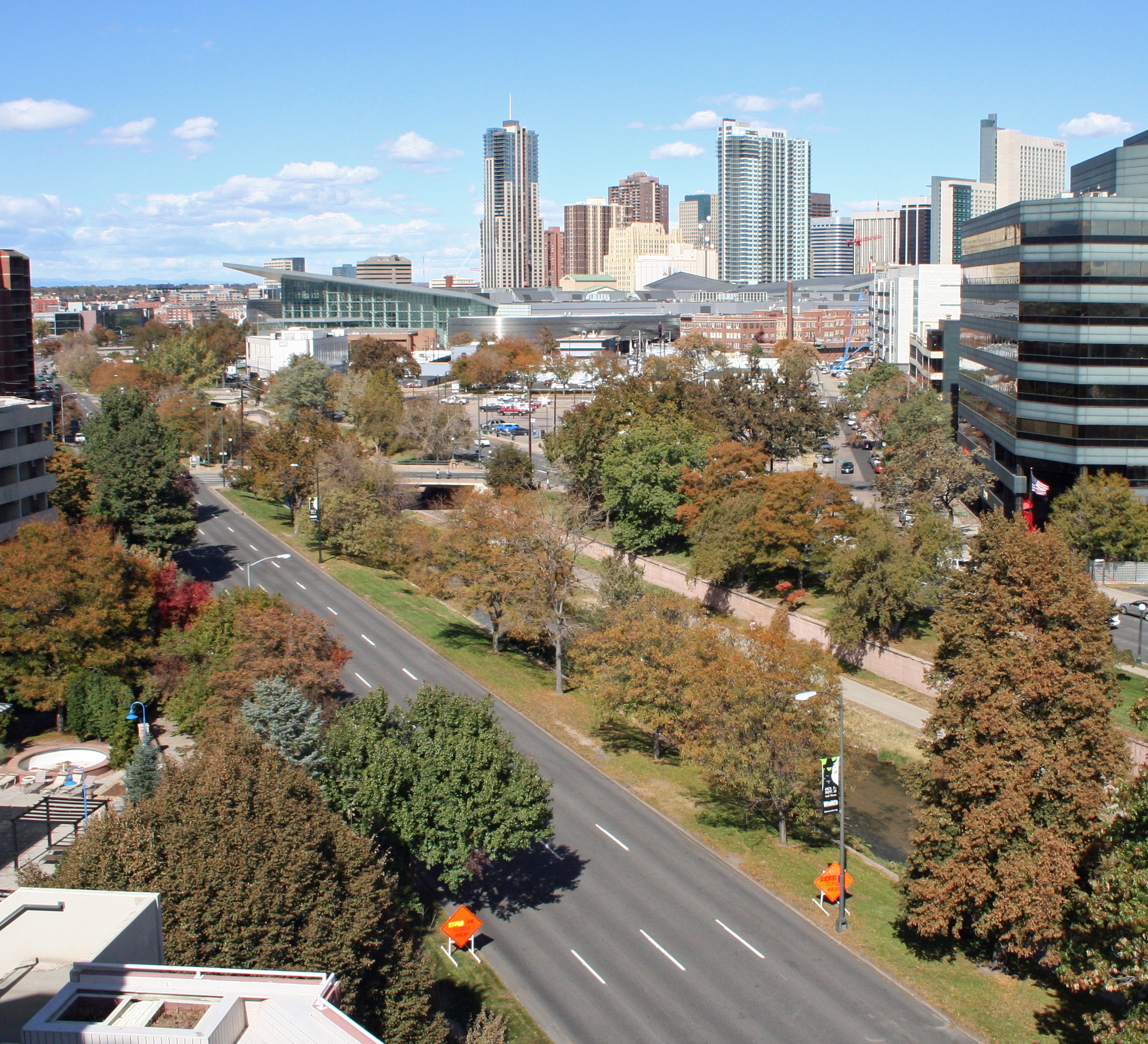
- Speer Boulevard, at 13th St. in Denver
- Location: Speer Blvd. from Irving St. to Downing St., Denver, Colorado
- Area: 59.9 acres (24.2 ha)
- Built: 1906
- Architect: S.R. DeBoer (landscape)
- MPS: Denver Park and Parkway System TR
- NRHP reference No.: 86002240
- Added to NRHP: September 17, 1986

Speer Boulevard, in Denver, Colorado, is a historic parkway. It runs from Irving St. in the West Highland neighborhood to Downing St. in the Country Club neighborhood, was built in 1906, and was listed on the National Register of Historic Places in 1986.

It is part of the Denver Park and Parkway System, which includes 16 parkways and 15 parks. It runs along the channel of Cherry Creek and includes the boulevard and triangles.

Design has been credited to both George Kessler and landscape architect S.R. DeBoer. The National Register Nomination states "Although the basic design was Kessler's, DeBoer's strong hand was involved in much of the planting design ..."

It includes three contributing structures and a contributing object.

The boulevard is named for Robert W. Speer, "who, according to some, single handedly brought the City Beautiful movement to Denver during his terms as mayor (1904-1912 and 1916-1918)."
