= Speer, Denver =

Neighborhood in Denver, Colorado, U.S.

Coordinates: 39.7194°N 104.9826°W

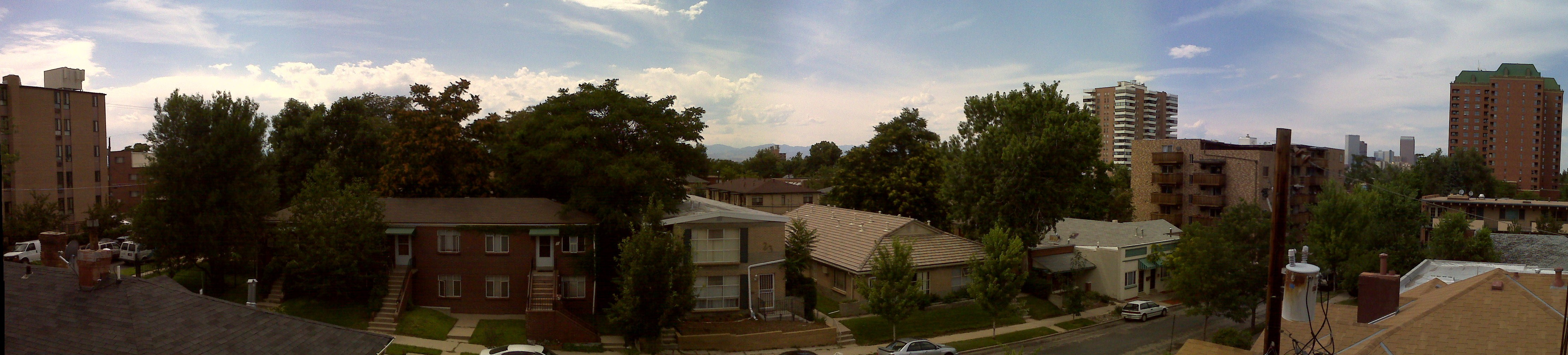
Central view of the Speer Neighborhood near Clarkson and Ellsworth.

Speer is the official name for the Denver neighborhood bounded by 7th Avenue (north), Broadway (West), Alameda Avenue (South) and Downing Street (East). The northeast portion northeast of Speer Boulevard is generally referred to as Alamo Placita due to a local park and historic district of this name.

== Characteristics ==
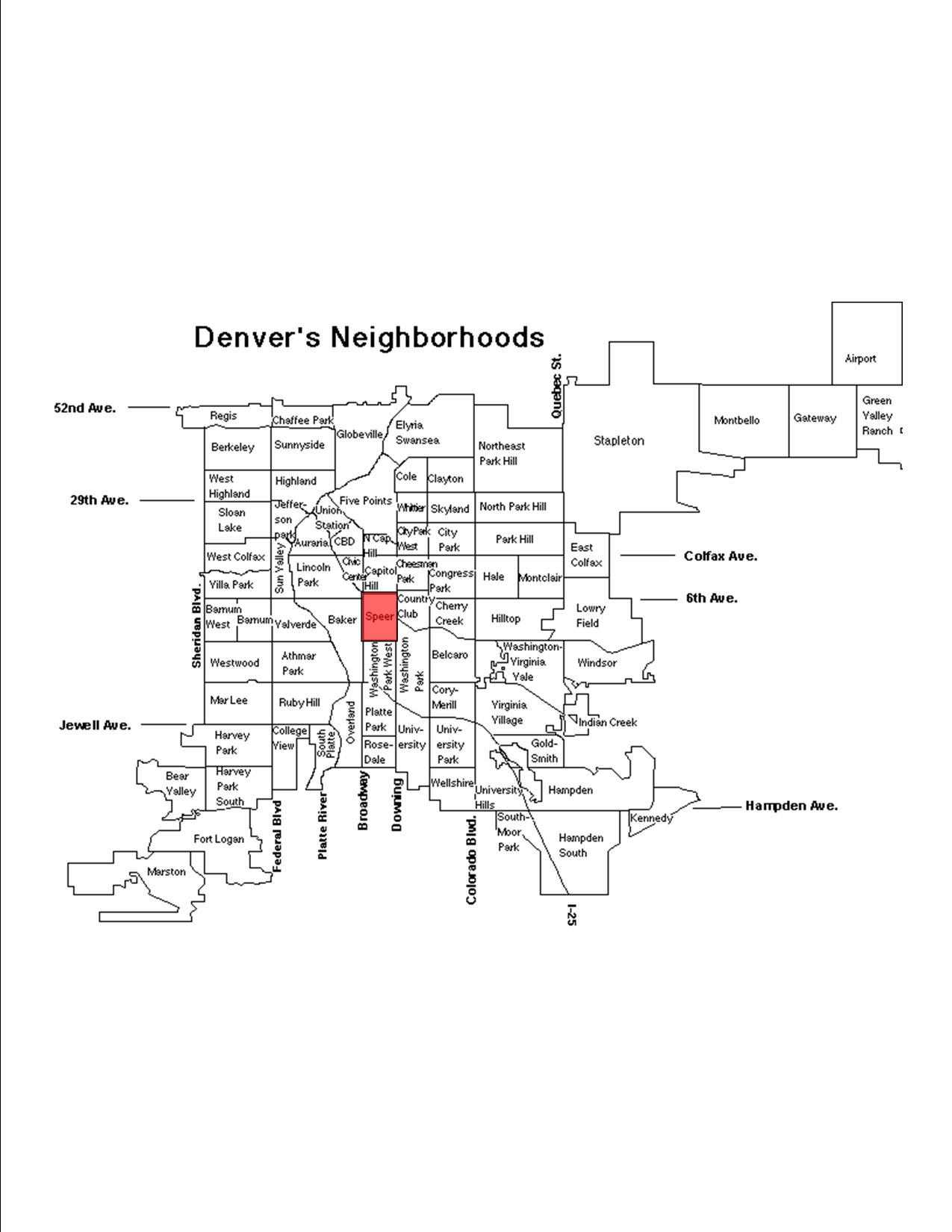
Speer Neighborhood

Generally, the neighborhood character is defined by the Capitol Hill neighborhood to the north, which is a highly dense neighborhood dominated by mid- and high-rise multi-family uses and the Washington Park West and Baker neighborhoods, which are to the south and west of Speer and comprised primarily low-rise multi- and single-family residential units. The Speer neighborhood itself contains both multi- and single-family residences, with the majority of commercial buildings found along primary thoroughfares such as Speer Boulevard, East 6th Avenue, Broadway and Alameda Avenue. The area's zoning is essentially complete and is approximately 98% built, with improvements 30 to 100 years old and ranging from below average to excellent condition. After the passing of Colorado Amendment 64 and the growth of Denver over the last half of 2010, the neighborhood has been undergoing redevelopment with older bungalows being scrapped for new, denser housing and empty lots being developed into condos, apartments, or mixed use developments.

== Recreation ==
Recreational outlets include Governors Park, which is immediately north of Speer, and Alamo Placita Park, which is located in the northeast portion of the neighborhood. Additionally, the Cherry Creek bike/pedestrian path is located along Cherry Creek/Speer Boulevard, and provides residents access to Denver’s trail system. Washington Park, Denver is also within easy biking and walking distance of the neighborhood.

== See also ==
- Bibliography of Colorado
- Geography of Colorado
- History of Colorado
- Index of Colorado-related articles
- List of Colorado-related lists
  - List of neighborhoods in Denver
  - List of populated places in Colorado
- Outline of Colorado
