= Smith's Irrigation Ditch =

Historic canal in Colorado, United States

- U.S. National Register of Historic Places
- U.S. Historic district
- Colorado State Register of Historic Properties
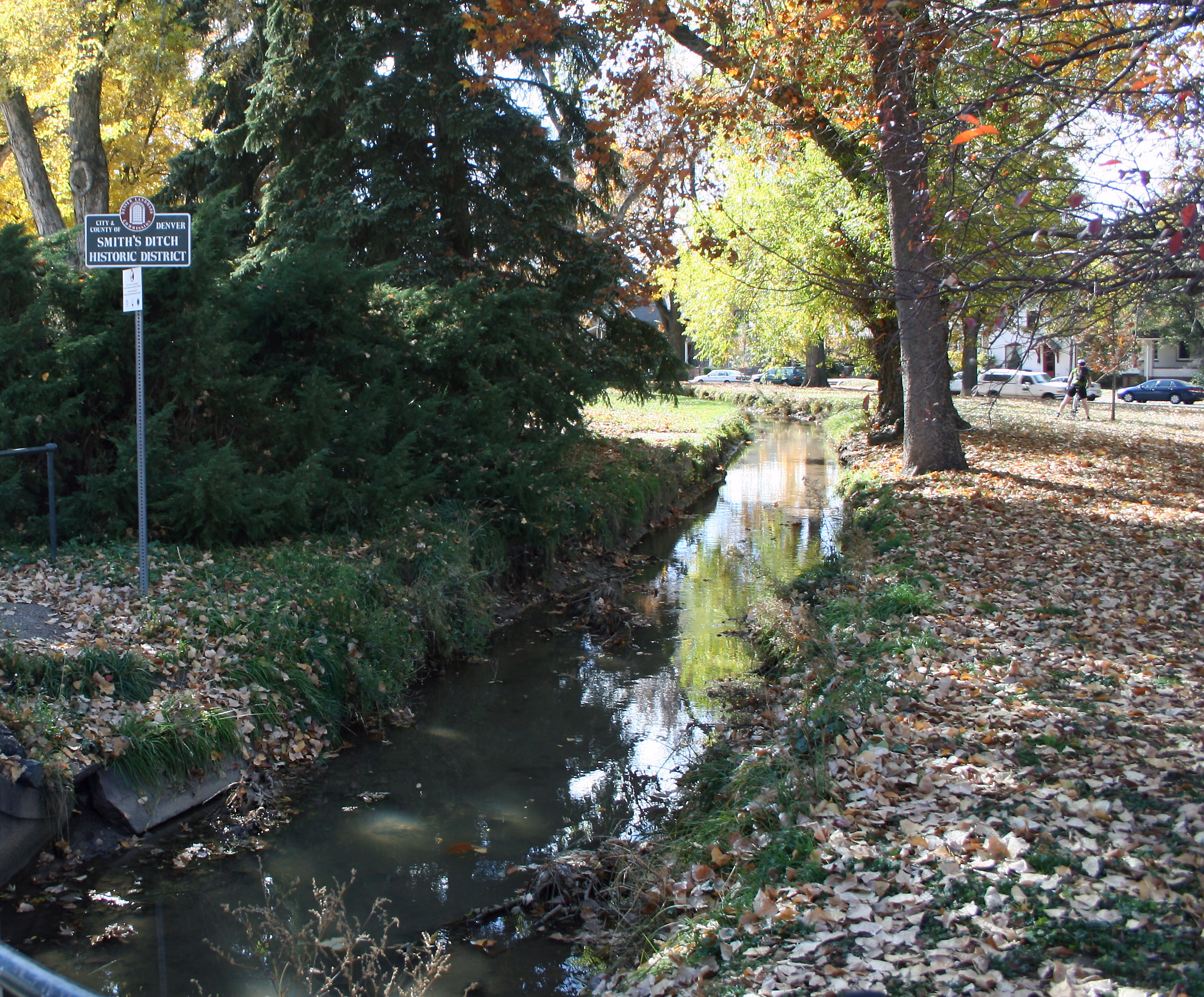
- Smith's Ditch in Washington Park

- Location within Colorado Location within the United States
- Location: Washington Park, Denver, Colorado
- Coordinates: 39°42′1″N 104°58′13″W
- Area: less than one acre
- Built: 1865
- Built by: John W. Smith
- NRHP reference No.: 76000555
- CSRHP No.: 5DV.181.3
- Added to NRHP: October 8, 1976

Smith's Irrigation Ditch, originally the Big Ditch and also known as the City Ditch, is a historic ditch primarily visible in Washington Park, Denver, Colorado. It is listed on the National Register of Historic Places.

Denver's first irrigation canal, it was surveyed and built during 1860 to 1867, as an open unlined ditch 3 feet (0.91 m) wide at its bottom, steep sides, and 7 feet (2.1 m) wide at the top. It was dug using horse-drawn plows and scrapers, in addition to manual labor.

It runs from the Chatfield Dam through 15 miles (24 km) of Englewood, Colorado, with Englewood taking some of its municipal water supply from it. Denver's Water Department takes control at Harvard Gulch near S. Downing St. and East Harvard Avenue and runs it through an enclosed pipeline, now, for about 8 miles (13 km) to Washington Park, where it remains as an open channel. It sustains trees, flowers, grass there.
