= Belcaro, Denver =

Neighborhood of Denver, Colorado, United States

Coordinates: 39.7003°N 104.9500°W

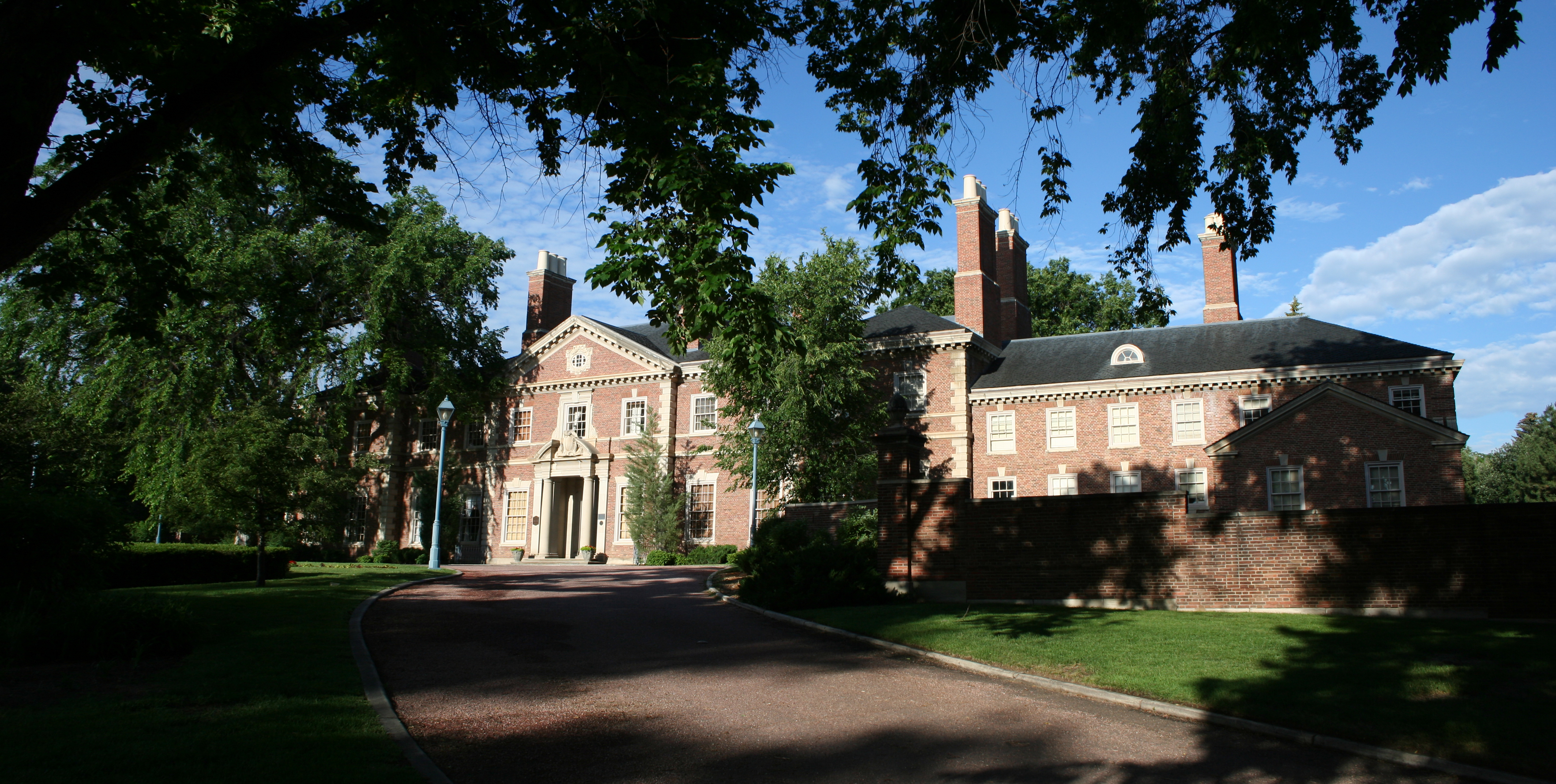
Belcaro, also known as the Phipps Mansion in the Belcaro neighborhood.

Belcaro is a neighborhood of Denver, Colorado. According to the Piton Foundation, in 2007, the population of the neighborhood was 4,394, and there were 2,343 housing units. The neighborhood is a wealthy one, and Piton Foundation data from 2000 indicates the neighborhood's average household income was $163,553.

== Boundaries ==
- North: Cherry Creek East Exposition Avenue
- East: Colorado Boulevard, which is also the border with Glendale
- South: East Tennessee Avenue
- West: South University Boulevard

== History ==
The neighborhood gets its name from the mansion of Lawrence C. Phipps (1862–1958) who was a United States Senator who represented Colorado from 1919 to 1931. Phipps chose “Belcaro” as the name of the mansion, yet today it is more commonly known as the Phipps Mansion. Phipps developed much of the neighborhood, and today it is dominated by many large ranch-style houses on large lots and tree-lined streets. A large gated community called the Polo Grounds occupies a section of the northern part of the neighborhood.

== See also ==
- List of neighborhoods in Denver
- List of populated places in Colorado
