= Barbara Cranmer =

Canadian documentary filmmaker

Barbara Cranmer (1959 or 1960 – May 17, 2019) was a 'Namgis documentary filmmaker. Her works focus on First Nations subjects. Telling real stories experienced by Indigenous people of Alert Bay, British Columbia.

Her 2016 film Our Voices, Our Stories, which won "Best Documentary Short" at the 40th American Indian Film Festival, documents the Canadian Indian residential school system.

Cranmer died of brain cancer.
