= Monaco Street Parkway =

Historic area in Colorado, US

- U.S. National Register of Historic Places
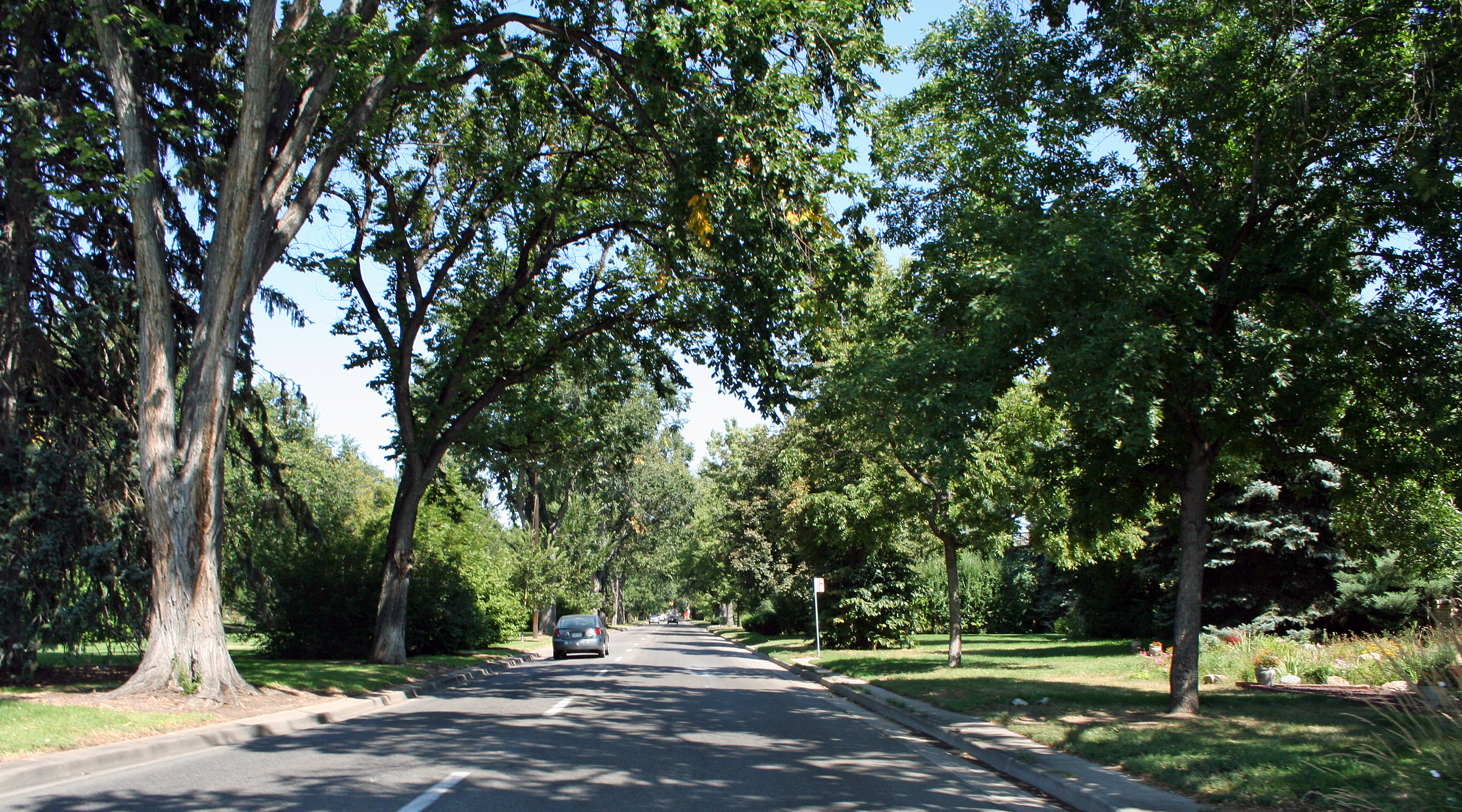
- Location: Monaco St. Pkwy. from E. First Ave. to Montview Blvd., Denver, Colorado
- Area: 28 acres (11 ha)
- Built: 1907
- Architect: S.R. DeBoer
- MPS: Denver Park and Parkway System TR
- NRHP reference No.: 86002207
- Added to NRHP: September 17, 1986

Monaco Street Parkway, in Denver, Colorado, is a parkway, part of the Denver Park and Parkway System, which was designed by architect S.R. DeBoer and was built in 1907. It was listed on the National Register of Historic Places in 1986.

The listed area, 28 acres (11 ha) in size, runs along Monaco Street Parkway from E. First Ave. to Montview Blvd. The listing included one contributing structure.
