= Saco Rienk de Boer =

American architect

- Born: September 7, 1883; Ureterp, Netherlands
- Died: 1974 (aged 90–91); Denver, United States
- Occupations: Landscape Architect and City planner

Saco Rienk DeBoer was a Dutch landscape architect and city planner. He was born on September 7, 1883, in Ureterp, Opsterland, Friesland, Netherlands to architect Rienk Kornelius De Boer and avid gardener Antje Dictus Benedictus. He studied engineering and passed the Junior Engineer (surveyor) exam. He went on to study landscape architecture at The Royal Imperial School of Horticulture in Germany. He was diagnosed with tuberculosis and returned home to Ureterp where he opened an office. His symptoms worsened in the summer of 1908; on the basis of doctor and family advice he emigrated to the United States in October 1908 to be treated at the Dutch operated Bethesda Sanatarium in Maxwell, NM. In 1909 when Bethesda Sanitarium moved to Denver, he moved with it, planning the landscaping for the new building. He became the official Landscape Architect of Denver from 1910 to 1931. He also designed the planned community of Boulder City, Nevada. In 1919, he joined with another Dutchman, M. Walter Pesman, to form a partnership. Together their projects were many, among them the landscaping of both sides of Speer Boulevard in Denver, and two early and innovative Colorado subdivisions, Bonnie Brae in Denver and The Glens in Lakewood, both of which feature winding streets and multiple small "pocket parks."

As a landscape architect, S R DeBoer designed dozens of city parks and hundreds of private gardens. As a city planner, he co-authored Denver's first zoning code, helped devise many of its roadways, and led in the development of mountain parks. He was partially responsible for such signature sites as Denver Botanic Gardens and Red Rocks Amphitheatre.

DeBoer's work extended well beyond Denver. He consulted for cities along the Front Range and on the Western Slope – including Greeley, Boulder, Golden, Longmont, Aurora, Fort Collins, Englewood, and Grand Junction – and far beyond, including Scottsbluff, Nebraska; Brainerd, Minnesota; Ruidoso, New Mexico; Idaho Falls, Idaho; Boulder City, Nevada; and Glendive, Montana. He even worked with National Resources Planning on more comprehensive planning, spending more than a decade devising programs for the states of Utah, New Mexico, and Wyoming.

More globally, Saco DeBoer articulated the content and design of the Rocky Mountain urban landscape, with a legacy revealed not only in the fabric of cities or the design of parks, but also in the hundreds of publications on everything from aesthetic design to soil characteristics in the transmontane West. As one memorial put it, "probably no other person has done as much to make this region a green oasis."

In 1948, he wrote a semi-autobiographical book about his life and landscaping work in Denver entitled "Around the Seasons in Denver Parks and Gardens".

Upon awarding him with the Civis Princeps award in 1972, Regis College noted that "many a good and generous man aspires to put a personal mark on his own city. Few have done so as indelibly – though as unobtrusively – as Saco Rienk DeBoer." More than a talented designer and a practiced aesthete, they asserted that "his was a 'voice before its time,' not only in ecological awareness, but in his concern over the 'modern' tendency towards dehumanization."

Over his lifetime, DeBoer was recognized in many ways: as a Fellow in the American Society of Landscape Architects; as a member of the Colorado State Planning Board, the American Institute of Planners, and the Netherlands Institute for City Planning and Housing. He received an Award of Merit from the Colorado Forestry and Horticulture Association, life membership in the Colorado Society of Engineers, and honorary membership in both the American Institute of Architects and American Society of Planning Officials. He was honored with a Distinguished Service Award from the American Institute of City Planning in 1960, an Outstanding Achievement Award from the Colorado Nurserymen's Association in 1961, a Distinguished Service Award from Americans by Choice in 1966. S R DeBoer Park, located in Denver's University neighborhood, is named in his honor. The Nevada Chapter of the American Planning Association has named its annual awards program, the DeBoer Awards for Excellence in Planning, after him.

== Attributed works ==
- Alamo Placita Park, built in 1927, Roughly bounded by Speer Blvd., First Ave., and Clarkson St., Denver, CO (DeBoer, S.R.), NRHP-listed
- Cheesman Park Esplanade, Roughly bounded by Eighth Ave., High St., Seventh Ave. Pkwy., and Williams St., Denver, CO (DeBoer, S.R.), NRHP-listed
- City Park, Roughly bounded by E. Twenty-third Ave., Colorado Blvd., E. Seventeenth Ave., and York St., Denver, CO (DeBoer, S.R.), NRHP-listed
- East Seventeenth Avenue Parkway, E. Seventeenth Ave. Pkwy. from Colorado Blvd. to Monaco St. Pkwy., Denver, CO (DeBoer, S.R.), NRHP-listed
- East Seventh Avenue Parkway, E. Seventh Ave. Pkwy. from Williams St. to Colorado Blvd., Denver, CO (DeBoer, S.R.), NRHP-listed
- Forest Street Parkway, Forest St. Pkwy. from Seventeenth Ave. to Montview Blvd., Denver, CO (DeBoer, S.R.), NRHP-listed
- Hungarian Freedom Park, Roughly bounded by Speer Blvd., First Ave., and Clarkson St., Denver, CO (DeBoer, S.R.), NRHP-listed
- Lake Guernsey State Park, 1 mi. NW of Guernsey, Guernsey, WY (Deboer, S. R.), NRHP-listed
- Lariat Trail Scenic Mountain Drive, Lookout Mountain Rd. S of US 6 to Golden Reservoir, Golden, CO (DeBoer, S.R.), NRHP-listed
- Melvin School, 4950 S. Laredo St., Aurora, CO (DeBoer, Ron & Henry), NRHP-listed
- Monaco Street Parkway, Monaco St. Pkwy. from E. First Ave. to Montview Blvd., Denver, CO (DeBoer, S.R.), NRHP-listed
- Rocky Mountain Lake Park, Roughly bounded by I-70, Federal Blvd., W. Forty-sixth Ave., and Lowell Blvd., Denver, CO (DeBoer, S.R.), NRHP-listed
- Speer Boulevard, Speer Blvd. from W. Colfax Ave. to Downing St., Denver, CO (DeBoer, S.R.), NRHP-listed
- Sunken Gardens, Roughly bounded by Speer Blvd., W. Eighth Ave., Delaware, and Elati Sts., Denver, CO (DeBoer, S.R.), NRHP-listed
- Bonnie Brae subdivision, bounded by S. University Blvd., E. Exposition Ave., S. Steele St., and E. Mississippi Ave.
- The Glens subdivision, Lakewood CO, bounded by Glen Moor Drive, Glen Ayr Drive, W. Colfax Ave., and W. 20th Ave.
