= Kyle Cranmer =

American physicist and professor

- Born: Little Rock, Arkansas, U.S.
- Education: University of Wisconsin-Madison; Rice University; Arkansas School for Mathematics, Sciences, and the Arts
- Known for: Higgs boson RooFit/RooStats; Data preservation open access e-publishing
- Awards: Presidential Early Career Award for Scientists and Engineers (2006); National Science Foundation's Career Award (2009); Goldhaber Fellow, Brookhaven National Laboratory
- Scientific career
- Fields: Physics
- Workplaces: New York University; Brookhaven National Laboratory
- Doctoral advisor: Sau Lan Wu

Kyle Cranmer is an American physicist and a professor at the University of Wisconsin-Madison, where he heads the Data Science Institute. Previously, he was a professor at New York University at the Center for Cosmology and Particle Physics and Affiliated Faculty member at NYU's Center for Data Science. He is an experimental particle physicist working, primarily, on the Large Hadron Collider, based in Geneva, Switzerland. Cranmer popularized a collaborative statistical modeling approach and developed statistical methodology, which was used extensively for the discovery of the Higgs boson at the LHC in July, 2012.

Cranmer is active in the discussions of data preservation, open access, reproducibility, machine learning, and e-science in the context of particle physics. Cranmer performed a search for exotic Higgs decays in archived data from the ALEPH experiment ten years after the experiment finalized. He serves on the advisory board for INSPIRE, the literature database for high energy physics, and is a member of the Data Preservation in High Energy Physics study group as well as Data and Software Preservation for Open Science.

Since the discovery of the Higgs boson, Cranmer has been a popular choice as a guest on science television programming. In July, 2011, Cranmer appeared in a special episode of Neil deGrasse Tyson's StarTalk Live alongside Bill Nye the Science Guy, Eugene Mirman, and Sarah Vowell. In a special video created for Science Nation, the online magazine of the National Science Foundation, Cranmer was featured discussing the Higgs boson in November, 2012. Cranmer also discussed the discovery of the Higgs boson in a TedxTalk in February, 2013.

Cranmer obtained his Ph.D. in physics from the University of Wisconsin-Madison in 2005 under Sau Lan Wu and his B.A. in mathematics and physics from Rice University. He was a Goldhaber Fellow at Brookhaven National Lab from 2005 to 2007. In 2007, he was awarded the Presidential Early Career Award for Scientists and Engineers from President George W. Bush via the Department of Energy's Office of Science and in 2009 he was awarded the National Science Foundation's Career Award. Cranmer is also a graduate of the Arkansas School for Mathematics, Sciences, and the Arts. He was named a Fellow of the American Physical Society in 2021.
