= Lloyd M. Joshel House =

- U.S. National Register of Historic Places
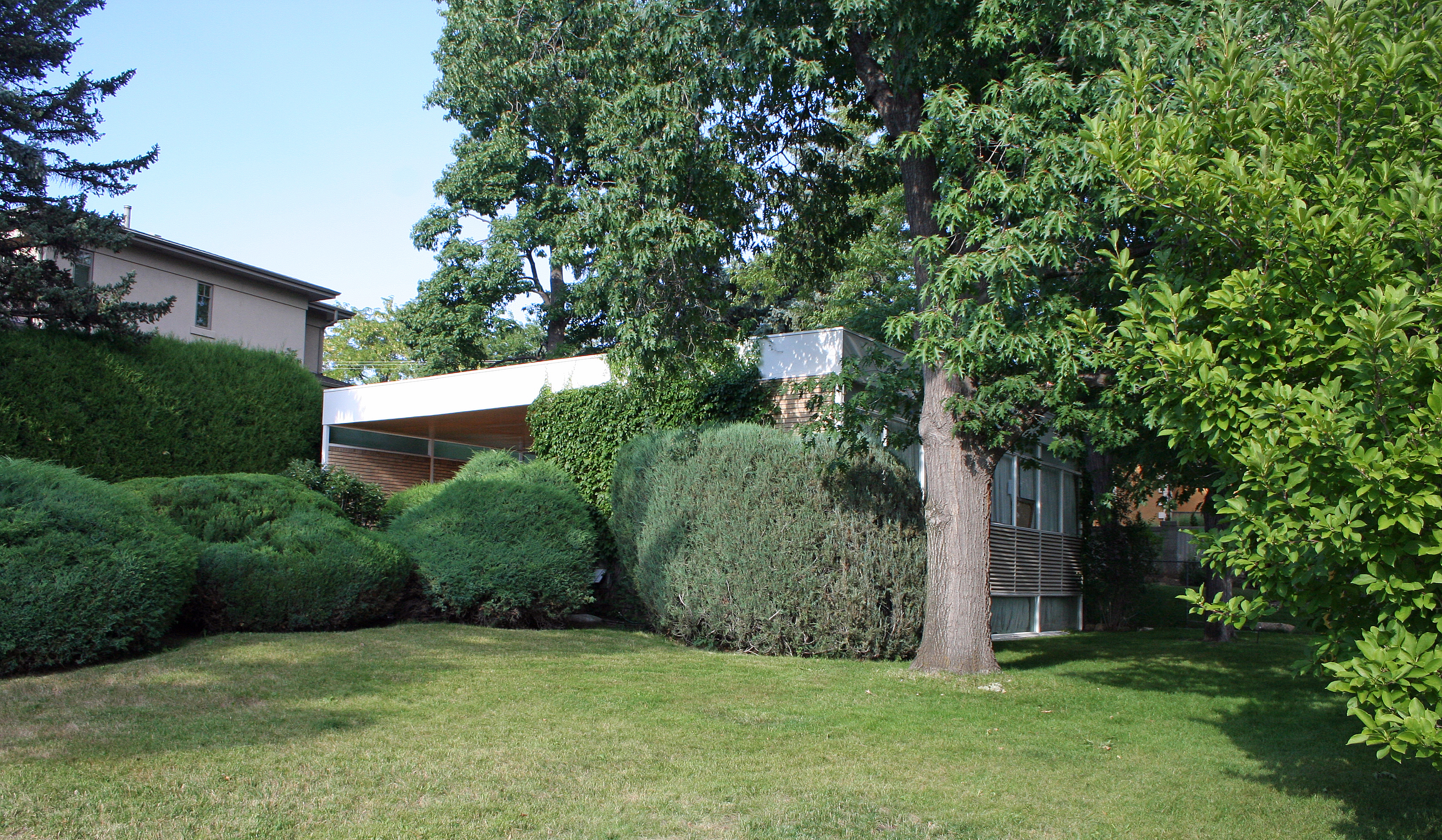

- Location within Colorado Location within the United States
- Interactive map showing the location of Lloyd M. Joshel House
- Location: 220 S. Dahlia St. Denver, Colorado
- Coordinates: 39°42′45″N 104°55′51″W
- Area: less than one acre
- Built: 1951
- Architects: Joseph and Louise Marlow
- Architectural style: International Style
- NRHP reference No.: 95001456
- Added to NRHP: December 28, 1995

The Lloyd M. Joshel House, also known simply as the Joshel House, is a private residence in the Hilltop Neighborhood of Denver, Colorado. Built in 1951, it is known as one of the finest examples of the International Style in residential architecture in Denver. The property is a local City of Denver Landmark and is listed in the National Register of Historic Places.

== International Style ==
The Joshel House is a distinctive example of the International Style. The International Style emphasizes the expression of volume rather than mass, balance rather than symmetry, and the absence of ornament. The philosophy underpinning the International Style also promotes, among other things, logical design to support building function and truth to materials. The International Style is rare in residential buildings in Denver, although contemporary commercial examples, including I.M Pei’s Mile High Center, are not uncommon. The International Style contrasts with Usonian and modern expressionist examples more common in the greater Denver area.

The nomination form for inclusion in the National Register of Historic Places describes the architecture of the house:

The Joshel House embodies the distinctive characteristics of the International Style. The Joshel House is devoid of ornament, relying for visual interest, instead, on the materials and on the building’s volume which has been conceived as a cubist composition. The building, which is essentially a cube, is horizontally oriented with ribbon windows, horizontally linked clerestory windows and glass curtain walls. The exterior walls are eave-less. There is a flat roof.

The house was designed by the husband and wife architecture team of Joseph and Louise Marlow, who designed numerous mid-20th Century structures, including the Far View Visitor's Center at Mesa Verde National Park.

== Lloyd and Suzanne Joshel ==
Lloyd M. Joshel and Suzanne Joshel reflected in their lives the changing cultural and social landscape of post World War II era in the United States. Mr. Joshel was a prominent figure in Colorado's Cold War history. Mr. Joshel was born in Geneva, Ill. in 1914 and died in Denver in 1999 at the age of 84. Educated at the University of Illinois and University of Ohio, and at Harvard University, Mr. Joshel was a chemist before and during World War II and, later, a business executive. He became the general manager of Dow Chemicals' Rocky Flats nuclear weapons plant in 1964. Mr. Joshel was general manager during a major fire that caused significant damage and contamination to the Rocky Flats facility.

South facade of Joshel House with Tony Meagar sculpture (since removed to Burns Park, Denver, Colorado)

Suzanne Joshel was a noted Denver patron of the arts. Ms. Joshel was born in 1921 in Berlin and after attending a year of college in Germany, her family sent her to London to escape the Nazis. Ms. Joshel met Lloyd Joshel in the United States and married him in 1947. They were divorced in 1994. Ms. Joshel was active in numerous causes, including helping pass the Voting Rights Act, and she was president of the Colorado League of Women Voters. Ms. Joshel amassed a large art collection, and the gardens at the Joshel House were dotted with many sculptures collected by her. Ms. Joshel died in 2009.

== Historic Designation ==
The Joshel House was nominated for inclusion on the National Register of Historic Places and was officially entered into the register in on December 28, 1995. The nomination form described the significance of the house as “the best example of a post World War II International Style residence in Denver.” At the time of its entry into the register, it was one of only a very few post World War II residences considered eligible for the National Register. The Joshel House was designated as a City of Denver Landmark on November 10, 1994.
