= Alamo Placita Park =

- U.S. National Register of Historic Places
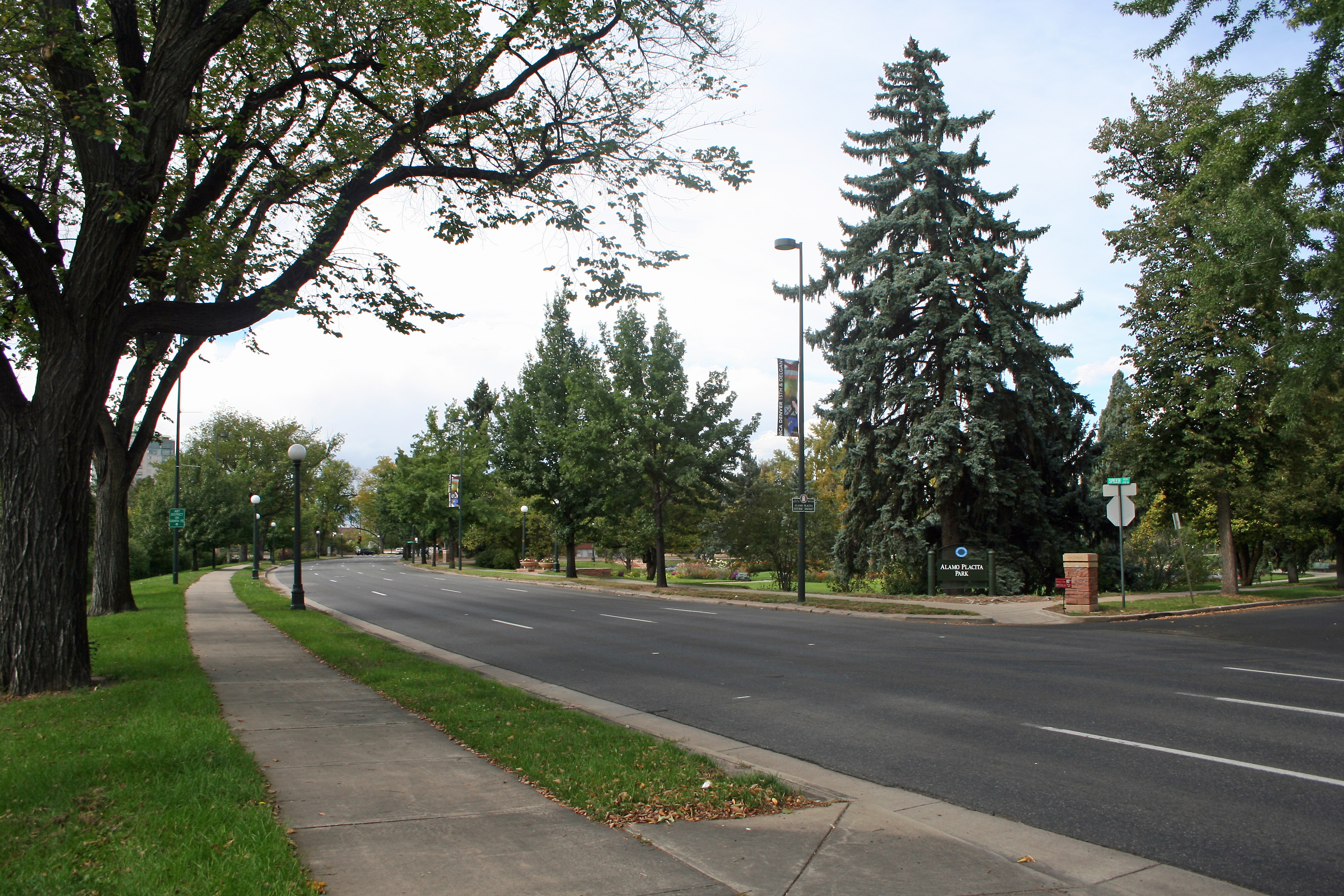

- Location within Colorado Location within the United States
- Location: Roughly bounded by Speer Blvd., Emerson St., 4th Ave., and Ogden St., Denver, Colorado
- Area: 5.4 acres (2.2 ha)
- Built: 1927
- Architects: DeBoer, S.R.
- Architectural style: Moderne
- MPS: Denver Park and Parkway System TR
- NRHP reference No.: 86002242
- Added to NRHP: September 17, 1986

Alamo Placita Park is a city park located in Denver, Colorado that is the namesake of the Alamo Placita, Denver neighborhood.

The park was established in 1911 by condemnation of property owned by Denver mayor Robert W. Speer's Arlington Park Realty Company. Landscape architect and city planner Saco Reink DeBoer, hired by Speer in 1910, eventually designed the park, and landscape work began in 1927.

The park is listed on the Colorado State Register of Historic Properties, and it was listed on the National Register of Historic Places in 1986.
