= John and Elivera Doud House =

Historic house in Colorado, United States

- U.S. National Register of Historic Places
- Colorado State Register of Historic Properties
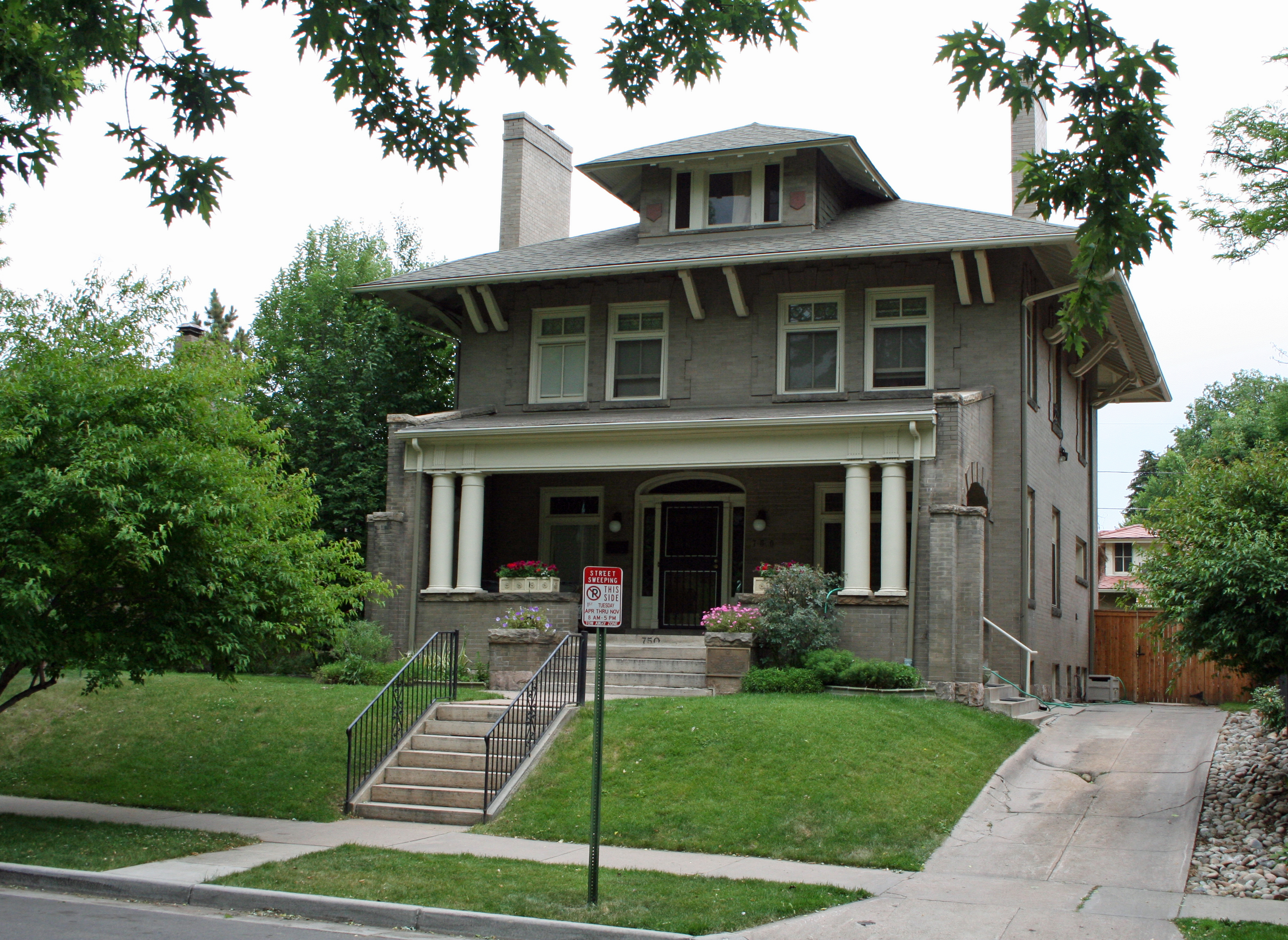

- Location within Colorado Location within the United States
- Location: 750 Lafayette St., Denver, Colorado
- Coordinates: 39°43′49″N 104°58′13″W
- Area: less than one acre
- Built: 1905
- Architect: Moorman, Edwin H.
- Architectural style: Late 19th And Early 20th Century American Movements, Foursquare
- NRHP reference No.: 05001087
- CSRHP No.: 5DV.747
- Added to NRHP: September 28, 2005

The John and Elivera Doud House was the residence of John Doud and Elivera M. Doud, the parents of Mamie Eisenhower, and the in-laws of U.S. President Dwight D. Eisenhower

== History ==
Mamie Eisenhower's father John Doud was born in 1870 in Rome, New York. He moved to Chicago, and then to Boone, Iowa, where Mamie was born in 1896. In 1905, the Douds moved to Denver, and lived at 101 Logan Street. In 1906, John Doud bought a residence at 750 Lafayette Street. This single family home was built at a cost of $6925 in 1905 by Gustave A. Ziegler. The architect was Edwin Moorman.

== Architecture ==
The architectural style of the Doud House is American Foursquare, which is locally called a "Denver Square." The house has a rectangular footprint with external dimensions of 32 feet by 36 feet. At the front of the house, there is a large full-width porch with brick sidewalls. The carriage house, originally used to park a car, was remodeled in the 1950s to accommodate the family's servants. During Eisenhower's presidency, the carriage house was used to house Secret Service agents who guarded the family.

== Famous events ==
The Doud House is most noted for various events connected with Mamie and President Eisenhower. Mamie Eisenhower lived in this house from 1906 until 1916. The Eisenhowers were married in the first floor music room on July 1, 1916. Their son, John Eisenhower was born in Denver on August 3, 1922, while Mamie was living in the house. The Eisenhowers vacationed many times and stayed with their inlaws, so along with Lowry Air Force Base the house came to be known as the Summer White House. President Eisenhower had his heart attack in the house on September 23, 1955, and he was treated at Fitzsimmons Army Hospital in Aurora, Colorado.

== Post Eisenhower ==
Elivera M. Doud died in the house on September 28, 1960. In July 1961, Mamie Eisenhower cleaned out the house. The house was sold in September 1961 to Mae Tiley, a real estate investor from Fort Collins, Colorado. In October 1961, Mamie Eisenhower donated many items from the house to the Colorado Republican Party. These were sold in a fund raising auction. Other items were donated to the Colorado Historical Society. Since then, the house has gone through several owners. It is still in private hands, and is not available for tours.
