= South Marion Street Parkway =

- U.S. National Register of Historic Places
- Colorado State Register of Historic Properties
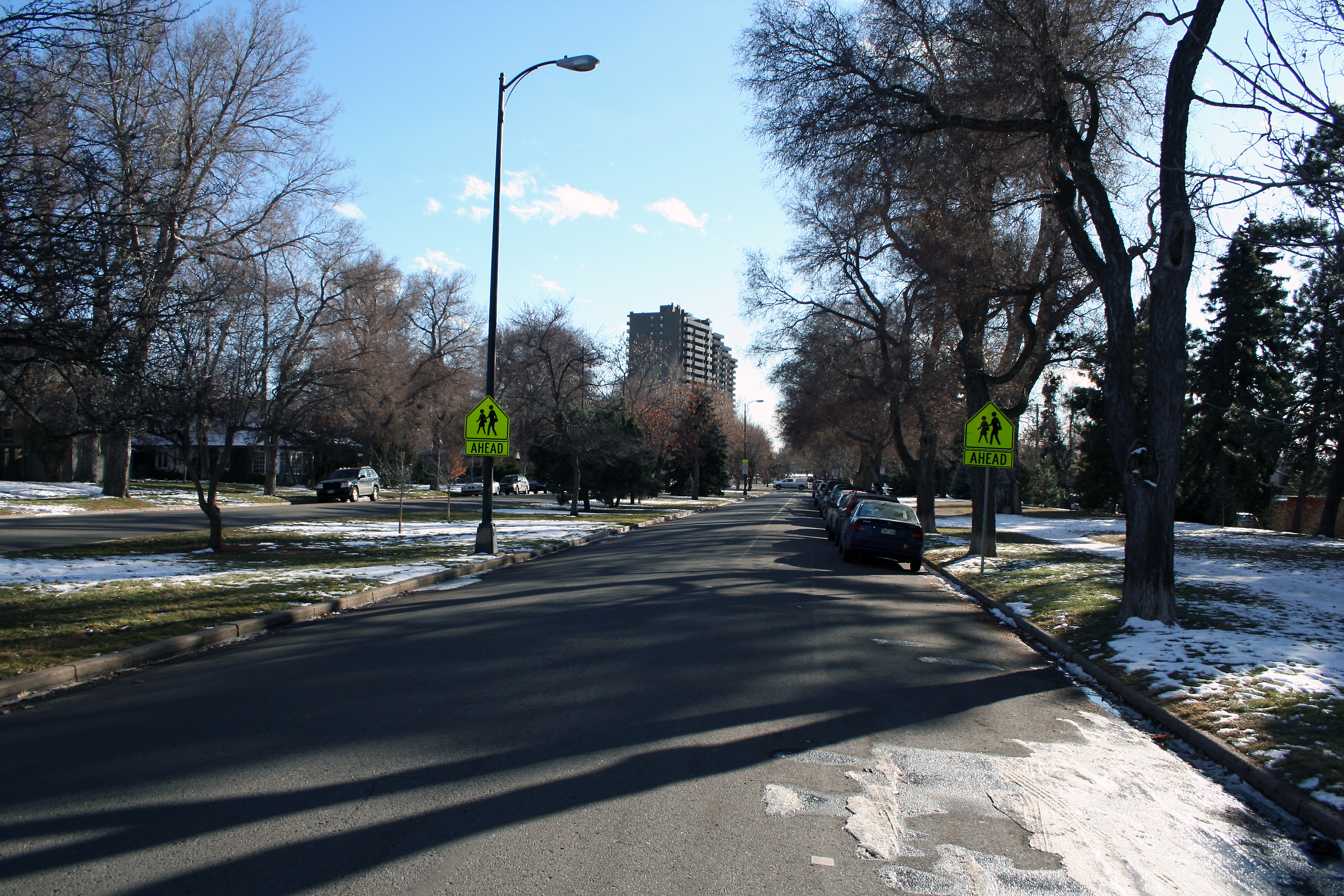
- The South Marion Street Parkway looking south
- Location: S. Marion St. Pkwy. from E. Virginia Ave. to E. Bayaud Ave. at Downing St., Denver, Colorado
- Coordinates: 39°42′47″N 104°58′20″W
- Area: 7.1 acres (2.9 ha)
- Built: 1913
- Architect: Kessler, George E.
- MPS: Denver Park and Parkway System TR
- NRHP reference No.: 86002239
- CSRHP No.: 5DV.5329
- Added to NRHP: September 17, 1986

South Marion Street Parkway is a historic parkway in Denver, Colorado. It was listed on the National Register of Historic Places in 1986 as part of a set of listings commemorating Denver's Park and Parkway System.

It is a four-block section which was completed in 1913.
