= East Sixth Avenue Parkway =

- U.S. National Register of Historic Places
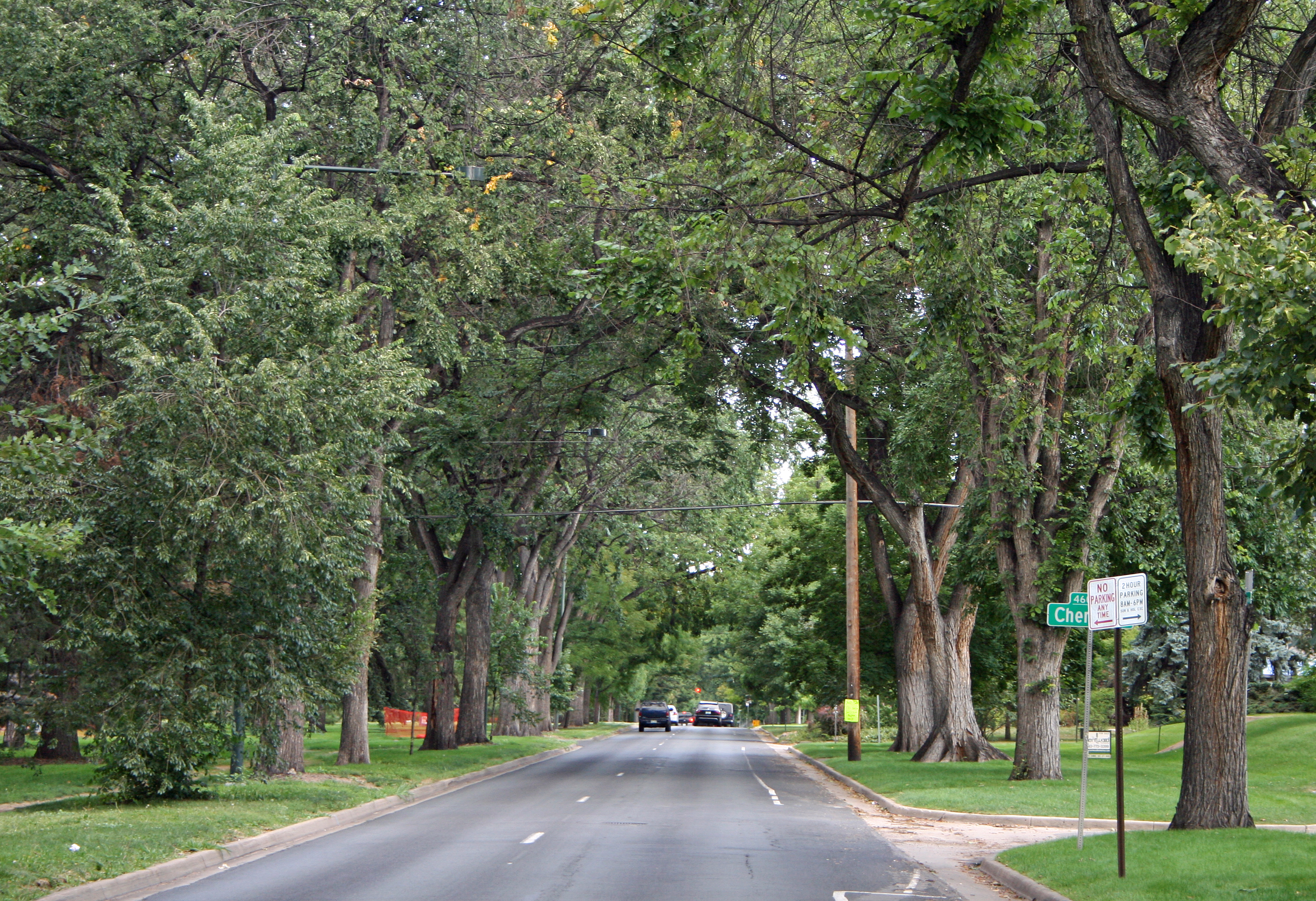

- Location within Colorado
- Location: E. Sixth Ave. Parkway from Colorado Blvd. to Quebec St., Denver, Colorado
- Coordinates: 39.718611°N 104.927222°W
- Area: 70 acres (28 ha)
- Built: 1909
- MPS: Denver Park and Parkway System TR
- NRHP reference No.: 86002214
- Added to NRHP: September 17, 1986

East Sixth Avenue Parkway is a parkway, part of the Denver Park and Parkway System, which was built in 1909. It was listed on the National Register of Historic Places in 1986.

It runs from Colorado Blvd. to Quebec St. in the Hale and Montclair neighborhoods of Denver, Colorado.

The listing included two contributing structures.
