= Phipps Mansion =

Historic mansion in Denver, Colorado, U.S.

- Belcaro
- U.S. National Register of Historic Places
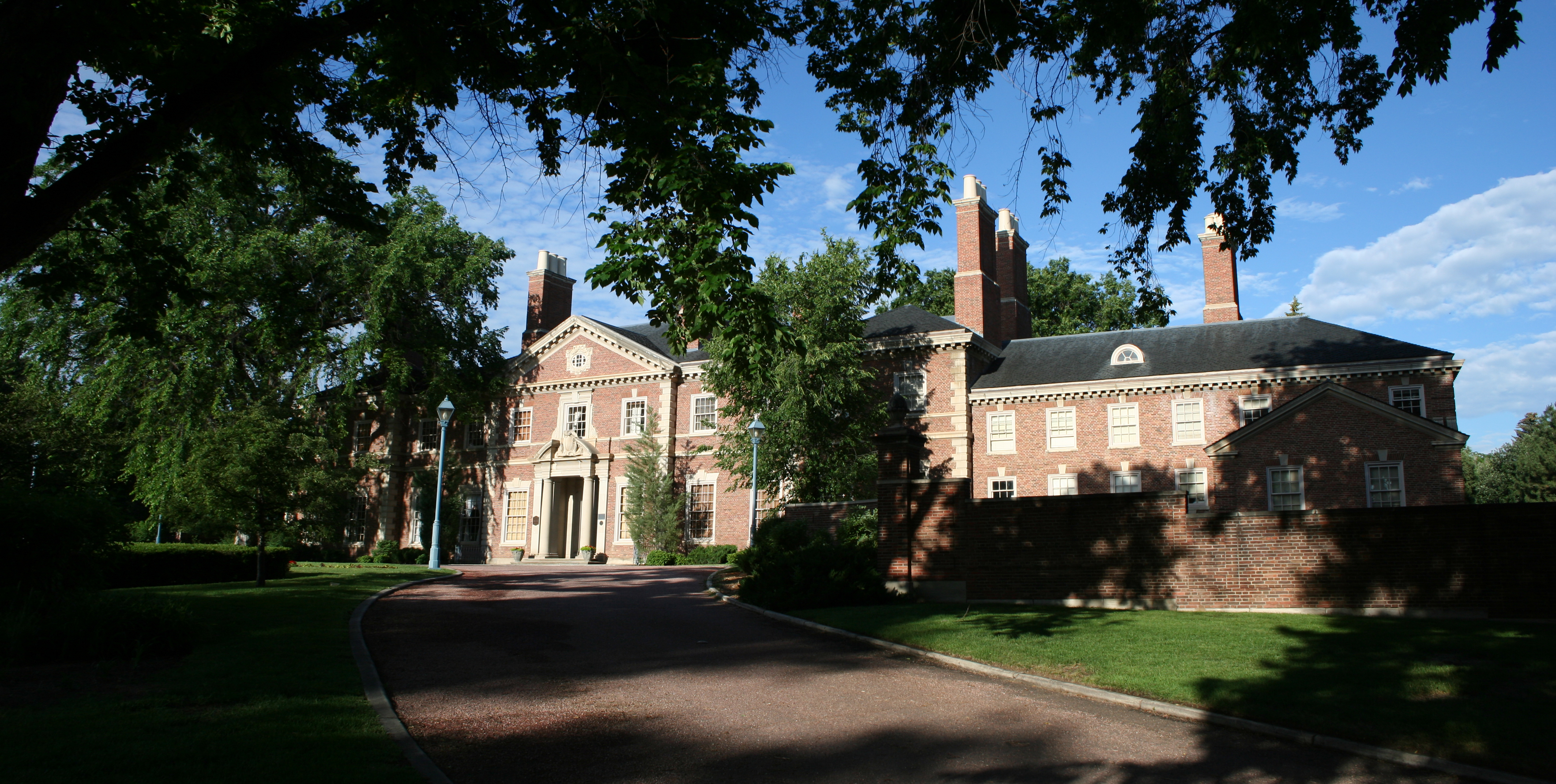

- Location within Colorado
- Location: 3400 Belcaro Dr., Denver, Colorado
- Coordinates: 39°42′04″N 104°56′51″W
- Area: 9 acres (3.6 ha)
- Built: 1932
- Built by: Platt Roger Construction Co.
- Architect: Fisher & Fisher
- Architectural style: Classical Revival, Georgian
- NRHP reference No.: 75000505
- Added to NRHP: February 10, 1975

Belcaro (also commonly known as Phipps Mansion) is a historic mansion and private residence in Denver, Colorado, specifically in the southeast Belcaro, Denver neighborhood at the corner of Madison Street and Belcaro Drive. Built between 1931 and 1933, the 33,000 square feet (3,100 m^{2}) Georgian style Phipps Mansion consists of more than seventy rooms, two of which were imported from England. The facility is decorated in the Chippendale and Queen Anne styles and features European, American, and Asian art.

Lawrence Cowle Phipps commissioned the mansion with his third wife, Margaret Rogers (daughter of Denver mayor Judge Rogers), hoping to provide jobs during the Great Depression. They called the residence Belcaro, which is Italian for "dear one". The neighborhood surrounding the mansion was developed by Phipps' Belcaro Realty and Investment Company and is called Belcaro.

== Return to private use ==
In December 2010, the mansion was sold to Denver philanthropist Tim Gill and his husband Scott Miller. Proceeds from the sale of the Phipps Mansion, valued at more than $9 million, were added to an existing Phipps endowment at the University of Denver.

As of 2025, it remains a private residence.
