= University, Denver =

Neighborhood of Denver, Colorado

Coordinates: 39.6740°N 104.9671°W

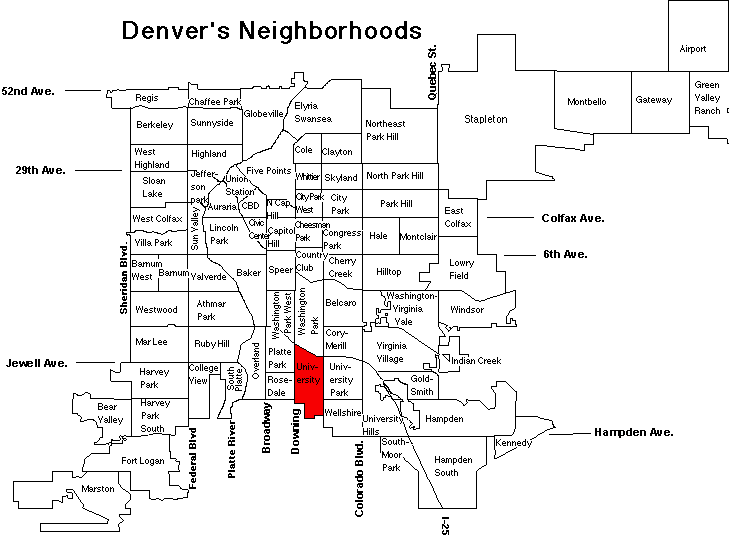
University, highlighted in this map of Denver neighborhoods

University is a neighborhood in Denver, Colorado. It is home to the University of Denver, many university students, and other residents and businesses, including the first Chipotle Mexican Grill.

== Geography ==
University is a neighborhood as defined by the city of Denver. The boundaries of university are the following:

- North – Interstate 25
- West – Downing Street
- East – University Boulevard
- South – Denver/Englewood Boundary

== Gallery ==
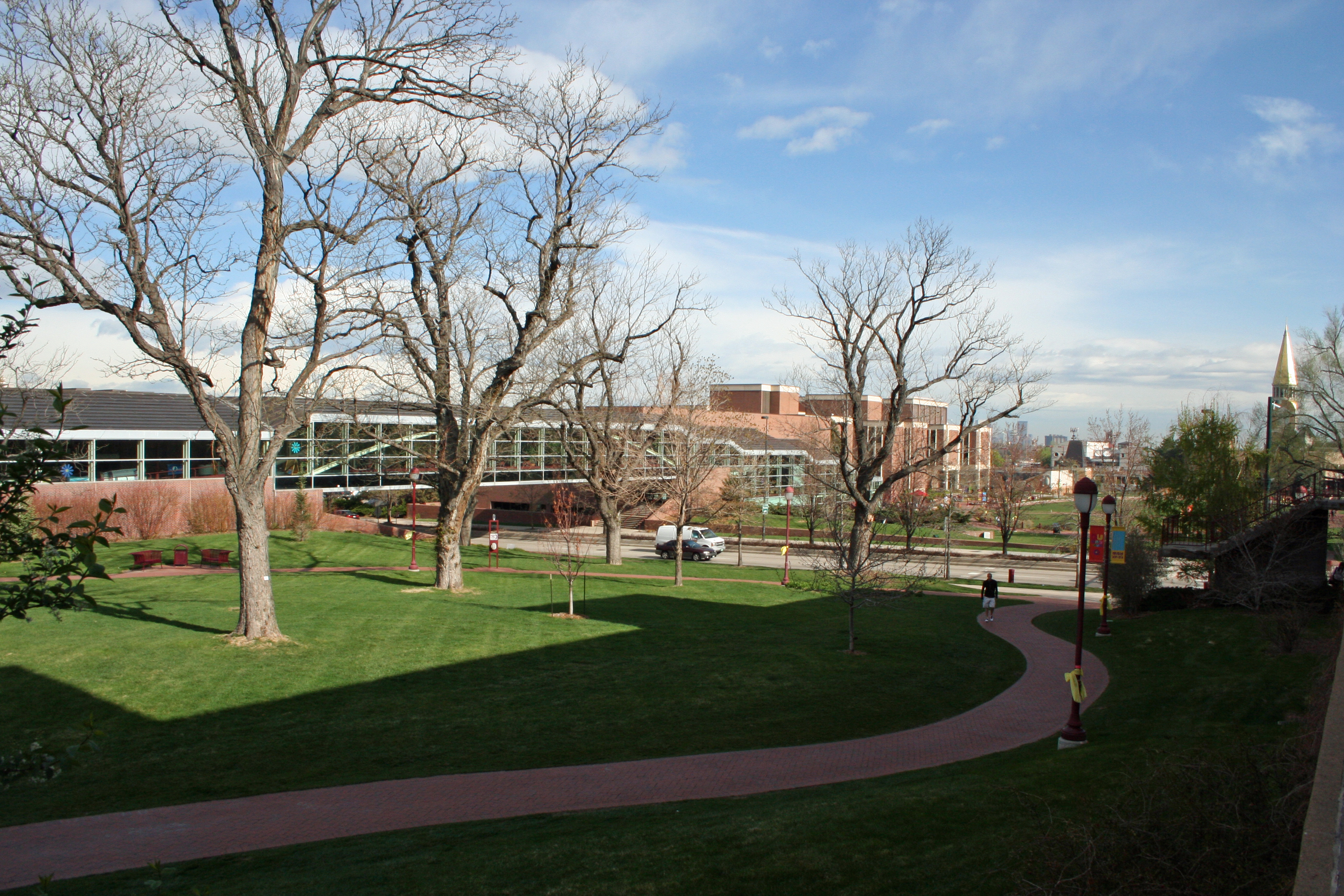
Part of the University of Denver campus in the University Neighborhood in Denver

== See also ==
- Bibliography of Colorado
- Geography of Colorado
- History of Colorado
- Index of Colorado-related articles
- List of Colorado-related lists
  - List of neighborhoods in Denver
  - List of populated places in Colorado
- Outline of Colorado
