= Country Club, Denver =

Coordinates: 39.7183°N 104.9653°W

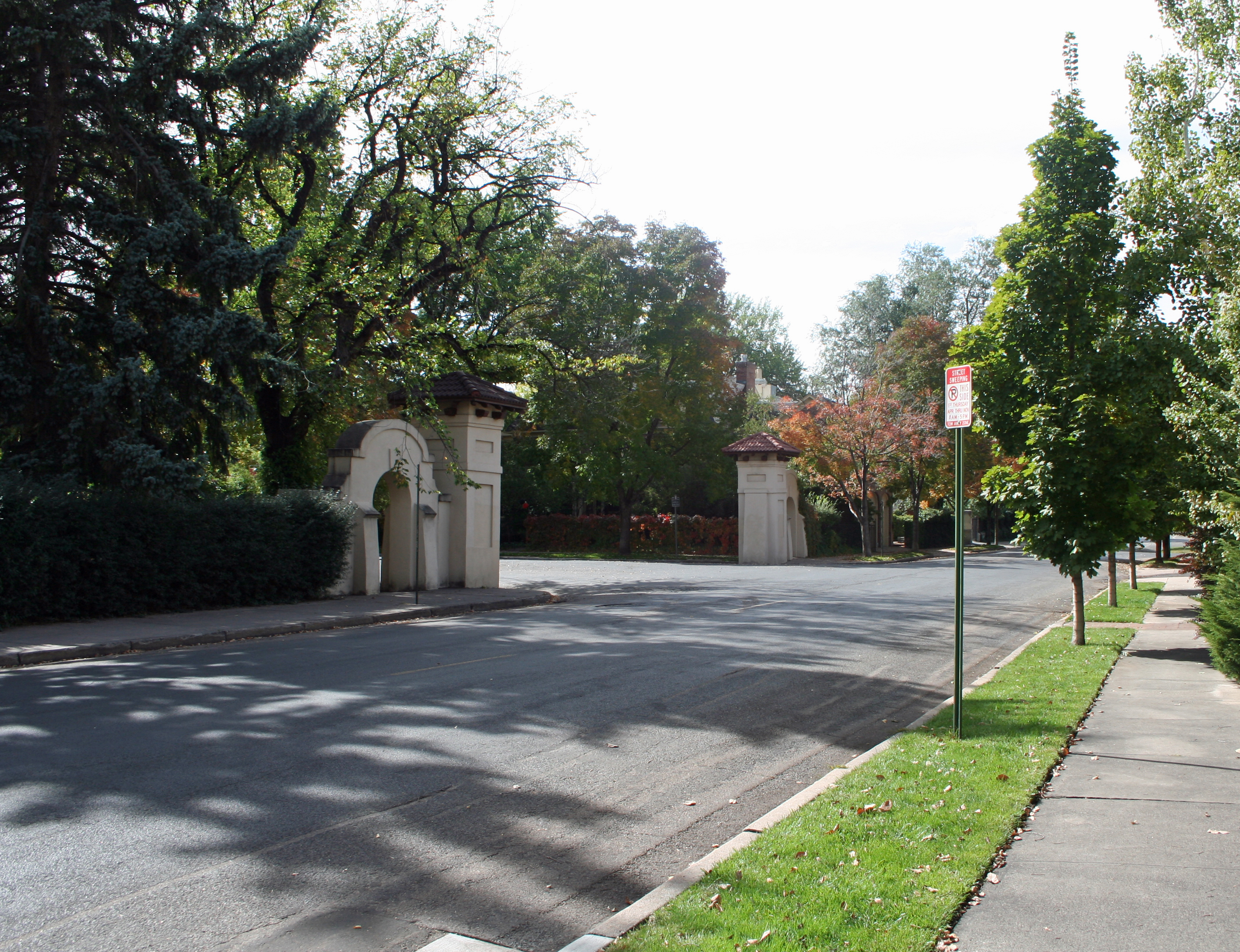
One of the gates to the Country Club Place subdivision in the Country Club Neighborhood along 4th Avenue in Denver.

Country Club is a neighborhood of Denver, Colorado. According to the Piton Foundation, "The Country Club neighborhood is bounded by University Boulevard, Cherry Creek, Downing Street, and 8th Avenue. Two main features of the neighborhood are the Denver Country Club and Country Club Place subdivision, designed by William and Arthur Fisher, working with Frederick Law Olmsted Jr. in 1909."

The neighborhood consists of 380 homes, making it one of Denver's smallest in number of homes. However, most of the lots and houses are large. Part of the neighborhood forms the Country Club Historic District, but the boundaries of the historic district and the neighborhood proper are not the same; the historic district is smaller and goes from 1st Ave. to 4th Ave. and from Downing St. to University Ave. At Race St. the district goes from 1st to 6th Ave.

The Denver Country Club, a private club, is located on the southern boundary of the neighborhood, along Cherry Creek.

== See also ==
- Bibliography of Colorado
- Geography of Colorado
- History of Colorado
- Index of Colorado-related articles
- List of Colorado-related lists
  - List of neighborhoods in Denver
  - List of populated places in Colorado
- Outline of Colorado
