= Washington Park, Denver =

Coordinates: 39°42′0″N 104°58′14″W

- Washington Park
- U.S. National Register of Historic Places
- U.S. Historic district
- Colorado State Register of Historic Properties
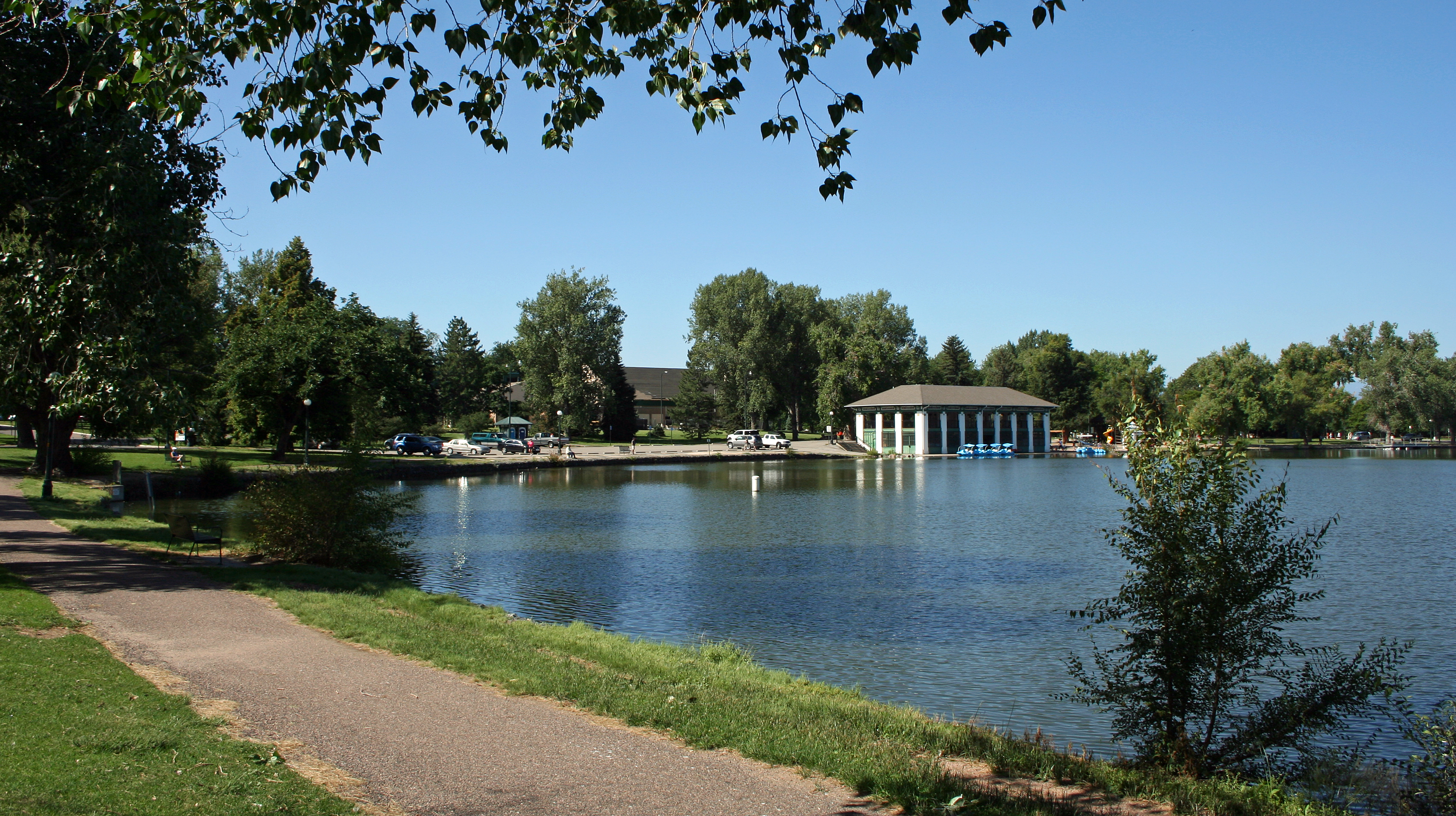
- Smith Lake and the 1913 Boat House in Washington Park in Denver.

- Location within Colorado Location within the United States
- Location: Denver, Colorado
- Built: 1899
- Architect: Reinhard Schuetze, among others
- Architectural style: Prairie School, Bungalow/Craftsman, Italianate
- NRHP reference No.: 86002238
- CSRHP No.: 5DV.5333
- Added to NRHP: September 17, 1986

Washington Park is a neighborhood and public urban park in Denver, Colorado. The Washington Park is a blend of historic and contemporary styles of architecture. The park was first developed by Architect Reinhard Schuetze in 1899. Its design was influenced by city planner Kessler, the Olmsted Brothers and philanthropist Margaret Brown. The park is popular with both tourists and area residents, with some comparing it to New York City's Central Park. Apart from activities such as walking, biking or volleyball, the park serves as a center for community gatherings, such as the annual Furry Scurry. Wedding receptions are often held in the historic boathouse pavilion. In 2012 the American Planning Association designated the park one of its "Great Public Spaces in America".

== Geography ==
The Washington Park neighborhoods highlighted on this map of Denver.

Washington Park is located in south-central Denver. The park is long and rectangular and is bordered by Virginia Avenue on the north, Downing Street on the west, Louisiana Avenue on the south, and Franklin Street on the east. It is one mile long by a quarter-mile wide, covering 165 acres (0.67 km^{2}), making it one of the largest parks in Denver.

The neighborhood generally referred to as "Wash Park" is often broken down into eastern and western sides: not only do both have their own neighborhood organizations and quite-different historical trajectories, but since 1972 official city statistics have tracked Washington Park West as separate from the easterly Washington Park. The eastern Washington Park neighborhood has borders defined by the city of Denver as Downing Street, Cherry Creek, I-25, and University Boulevard. The public park is bounded along its long western edge by Washington Park West, and along all its other edges by eastern Washington Park. The park has two lakes, ten tennis courts, a large meadow used for lawn sports such as volleyball and soccer, a lawn bowling green, two of the city's largest flower gardens, and its busiest recreation center.

== History ==
Washington Park was initially designed by the German landscape architect Reinhard Schuetze between 1899 and 1908. His design remains fairly intact and included Smith and Grasmere lakes and the Lily Pond, all fed with a city ditch that Schuetze had edged with Russian olives and other trees. Other pieces of his design remain intact and include the large meadow edged with a grove of trees to the south of Smith Lake and the carriage ways that meander through the park. Later landscape architects, such as Saco Rienk DeBoer and Frederick Law Olmsted Jr. added their own contributions to the park including a boating pavilion and an evergreen grove on the north side of the park.

Washington Park as a neighborhood started development soon after the founding of Denver though it was still fairly rural in nature. By 1886, there was enough population to create Denver's first suburb, South Denver, which by the silver bust of the 1890s was annexed into Denver due to financial difficulties. Development hastened with the creation of the park in 1899. Most of the houses were built of brick between 1900 and 1940.

The park was designed in French country style with new paths and plantings introduced by city planner George Kessler in 1908. DeBoer architects were responsible for completing the big Perennial Garden at Downing in 1918 and Mt. Vernon Gardens in 1926. The Olmsted Brothers designed rolling Evergreen Hill, enhanced the pedestrian paths, and built the Lily Pond in 1912. The boating pavilion, which was built in 1913, was designed by Jacques Benedict in 1913 following the Italian style of architecture. The bathing beach was installed on Smith Lake in 1911 and the pedestrian and car bridges over City Ditch were installed by architect F.W. Ameter in 1912. The Field House, the residence of poet and journalist Eugene Field, was moved to the park's northeast edge by Titanic survivor and philanthropist Molly Brown in 1930. The modern Recreation center was designed in 1971 by the architectural firm Anderson Barker Rinker.

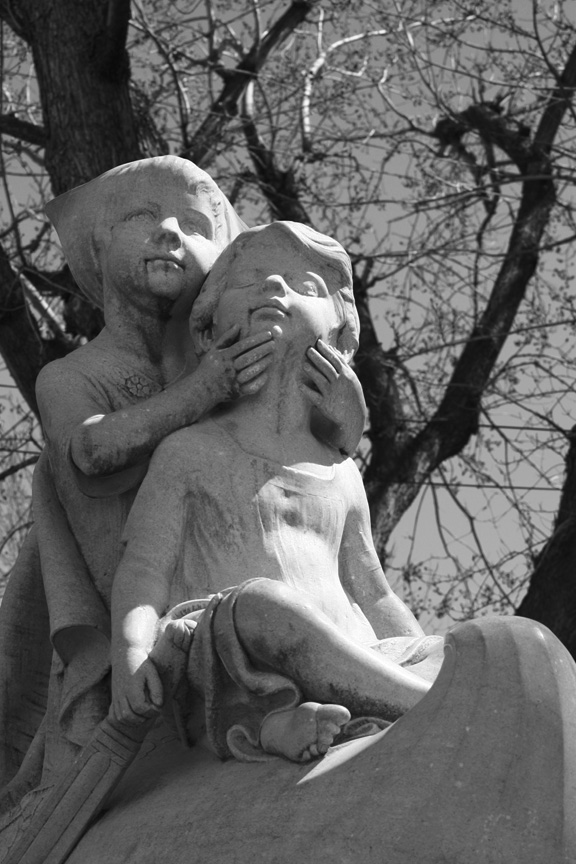
Statue of Wynken, Blynken, and Nod in Washington Park

Eugene Field, a reporter for the Denver Tribune between 1881 and 1883, lived in a small cottage at 315 West Colfax Avenue. Field is best remembered, though, for his children's poems. Years after Field left Denver and the house had been condemned, Molly Brown bought the house and donated it to the city. It was designated a landmark, moved to the east side of Washington Park, at Franklin St. and Exposition Ave., and restored. It served as the Eugene Field Branch of the Denver Public Library for many years. Field is further memorialized by the statue by Mabel Landrum Torrey, illustrating one of his most famous poems, "Wynken, Blynken and Nod". In the 1970s the house became the headquarters of the Park People and the library moved to a new larger building at S University Blvd. and E Ohio Ave.

Since the late 1990s, Washington Park has become a very popular urban neighborhood because of its central location, its proximity to the park, and its access to several commercial business enclaves. This has led to a transformation of the neighborhood, which worries some residents because of an increased density, more traffic, and the propensity of some developers to "pop the top" or altogether "scrape" historic homes.

== Characteristics ==
The park includes several trails, including one that goes around the perimeter of the park, tennis courts, a lawn bowling/croquet field, and two playgrounds. A recreation center with an indoor pool, free weights, and other athletic facilities is also located in the park. Smith Lake has a boathouse that can be rented out for various events.

The park connects to the city via a number of bike trails at Exposition Avenue, Marion St. and Louisiana Avenue. The system of asphalt and gravel paths facilitates diverse uses: bicyclists, pedestrians, roller bladers, skateboarders, strollers, pet walkers, rented surreys, etc. The grove trees planted at intervals allow views of the Front Range mountains west of the park. The park is also known for its flower garden, the largest in Denver. Built in 1917, it was a Victorian-style Perennial Garden that included an elliptical lawn and symmetrical flowerbeds with 15,000 flower varieties.

The flower garden also includes 54 flower beds in an informal arrangement. One garden is an exact replica of Martha Washington's garden at Mt. Vernon.

Some of the artefacts in the park include the sculptor Mabel Torrey's "Wynken, Blynken and Nod", which honors poet Eugene Field (1919); and George Carlson's bronze "Early Day Miner," that depicts local history (1980).

The Washington Park neighborhood is one of the oldest in Denver and includes many early twentieth century brick houses and even some late nineteenth century brick houses in West Washington Park. There are several commercial enclaves in the neighborhood such as South Gaylord Street and Alameda Avenue, as well as several smaller corner store areas located at stops of the former streetcars that ran down the residential streets. The South Pearl Street area, in the neighboring Platt Park neighborhood, is frequently misidentified as being part of the Washington Park neighborhood.

The neighborhood borders I-25, which was expanded in 2006 and includes the RTD light rail. The Louisiana/Pearl station and University of Denver stations connect the southern part of the Washington Park neighborhood with the light rail network, and the Broadway station serves West Washington Park. The south end of the park itself borders South High School.

== Preservation practices ==
A landscape and structure preservation plan was prepared for the park in 2003. This master plan for the park was updated and completed in March 2011. A $1.5 million budget was prepared for the renovation of the park's south entrance, picnic site at Mt. Vernon gardens, and the City Ditch.

The goals for the treatment of the park included the preservation of historic site patterns, site features, structures, site remnants, and vegetation. Other works included the restoration of the definitive edges of the park spaces and the re-establishment of tree groves, paths, and topography defining the open spaces. Preservation of the perimeter road as a significant landscape characteristic, modified to reflect bicycle and pedestrian use of the road, was also one of the recommendations. Landscape features such as meadow areas in the park were to be restored with native grasses and wildflowers to reduce water consumption. The lakeshore restoration was intended to focus on historic lake design and rehabilitation of City Ditch to convey historic flows. Other goals included the reuse of irrigation water through the city ditch system and water-saving measures for swimming pools, showers, and faucets. Most of the conservation practices address the conflicts between pedestrians, bicyclists, and motorists, park plant diversity, and water quality issues.

== See also ==
- Bibliography of Colorado
- Geography of Colorado
- History of Colorado
- Index of Colorado-related articles
- List of Colorado-related lists
  - List of neighborhoods in Denver
  - List of populated places in Colorado
- Outline of Colorado
