= Lowry, Denver =

Coordinates: 39.7199°N 104.8907°W

Lowry is a neighborhood in the City and County of Denver, Colorado. The Lowry neighborhood is located at the site of the former Lowry Air Force Base. The old Lowry Firehouse has been converted into Colorado Free University. The Denver U.S. Post Office (ZIP Code 80230) serves the neighborhood. A satellite campus of the University of Northern Colorado also exists in the area.

== See also ==
- Bibliography of Colorado
- Geography of Colorado
- History of Colorado
- Index of Colorado-related articles
- List of Colorado-related lists
  - List of neighborhoods in Denver
  - List of populated places in Colorado
- Outline of Colorado
