= Hilltop, Denver =

Neighborhood in Denver, Colorado, United States

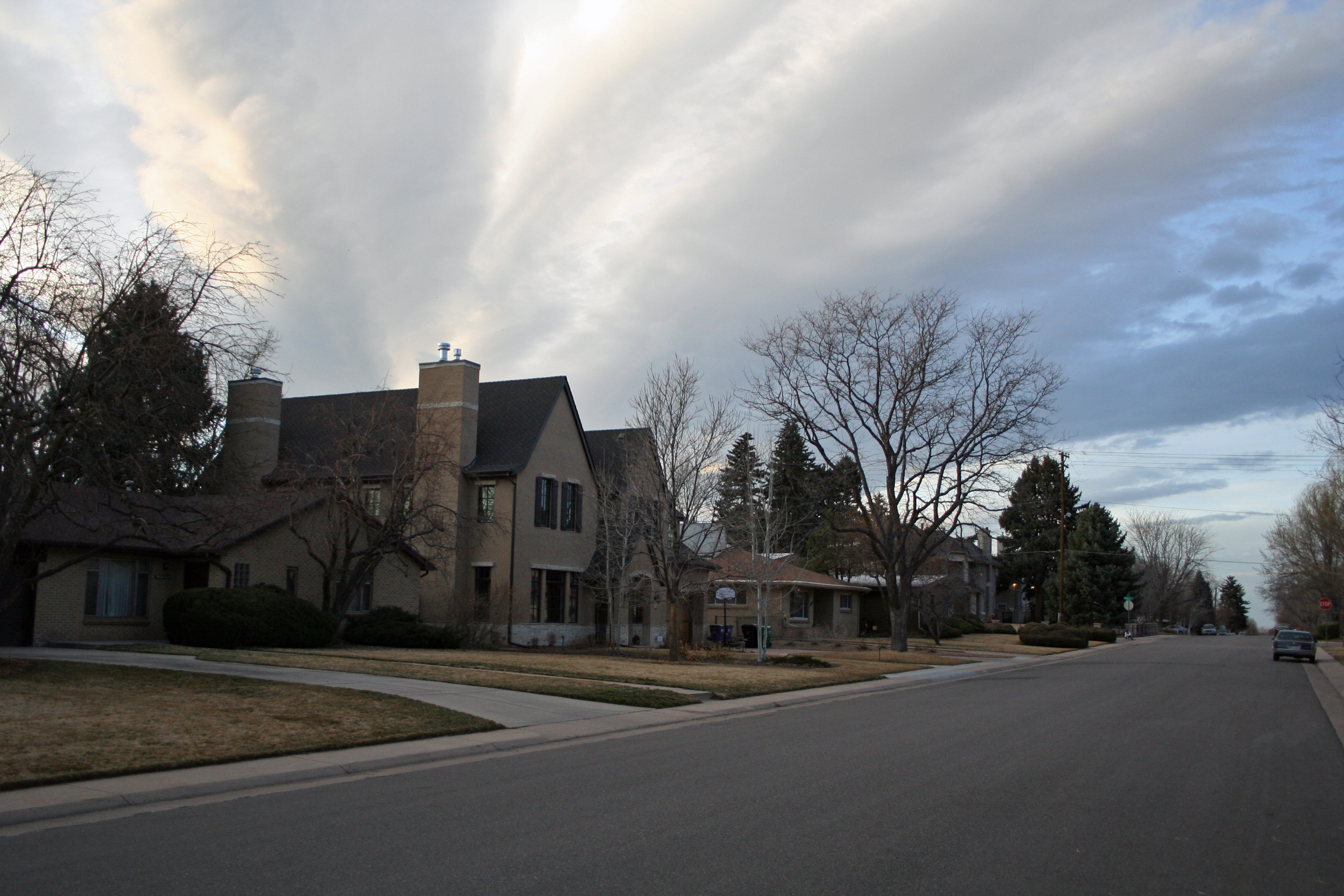
A street in the Hilltop Neighborhood of Denver. Note the juxtaposition of the original construction from the 1950s (the house on the left) and the new construction (2008) exemplified by the large house just left of center.

Hilltop is a neighborhood of Denver, Colorado. According to the Piton Foundation's summary of United States Census data, the 2016 population of the neighborhood was 9,311, average household income was $215,780, and there were 3,973 housing units.

== Boundaries ==
The City of Denver-defined neighborhood of Hilltop is bordered on the west by Colorado Boulevard, on the north by 6th Avenue, and on the south by Alameda Avenue. The eastern boundary is irregular, extending to Quebec Street at the north end, and encompassing properties on both sides of Monaco Parkway at the south end.

== Landmarks ==
The Hilltop neighborhood gets it name from the fact that it is higher in elevation than the surrounding parts of the city. In the center of the neighborhood is Cranmer Park, with a view of the Front Range mountains.

The Graland Country Day School, an independent, co-educational day school for grades K-9 is located in the neighborhood, as is Temple Emanuel, Carson Elementary, Steck Elementary and Hill Campus of Arts and Sciences. On Holly St, on the border between what is Hilltop and the unofficial neighborhood of Cranmer, is a small congregation of shops including Kazumi Sushi, Locanda del Borga, an Italian restaurant and Fierce45, which provides full body workout classes.

== Character ==
Hilltop is one of Denver's wealthiest neighborhoods. It was developed in the 1940s and 1950s, and since the 1990s, many of the original houses have being demolished and replaced with large houses on medium-sized lots.

== See also ==
- Bibliography of Colorado
- Geography of Colorado
- History of Colorado
- Index of Colorado-related articles
- List of Colorado-related lists
  - List of neighborhoods in Denver
  - List of populated places in Colorado
- Outline of Colorado
