= Cranmer Park =

Public park in Denver, United States

- U.S. National Register of Historic Places
- Colorado State Register of Historic Properties
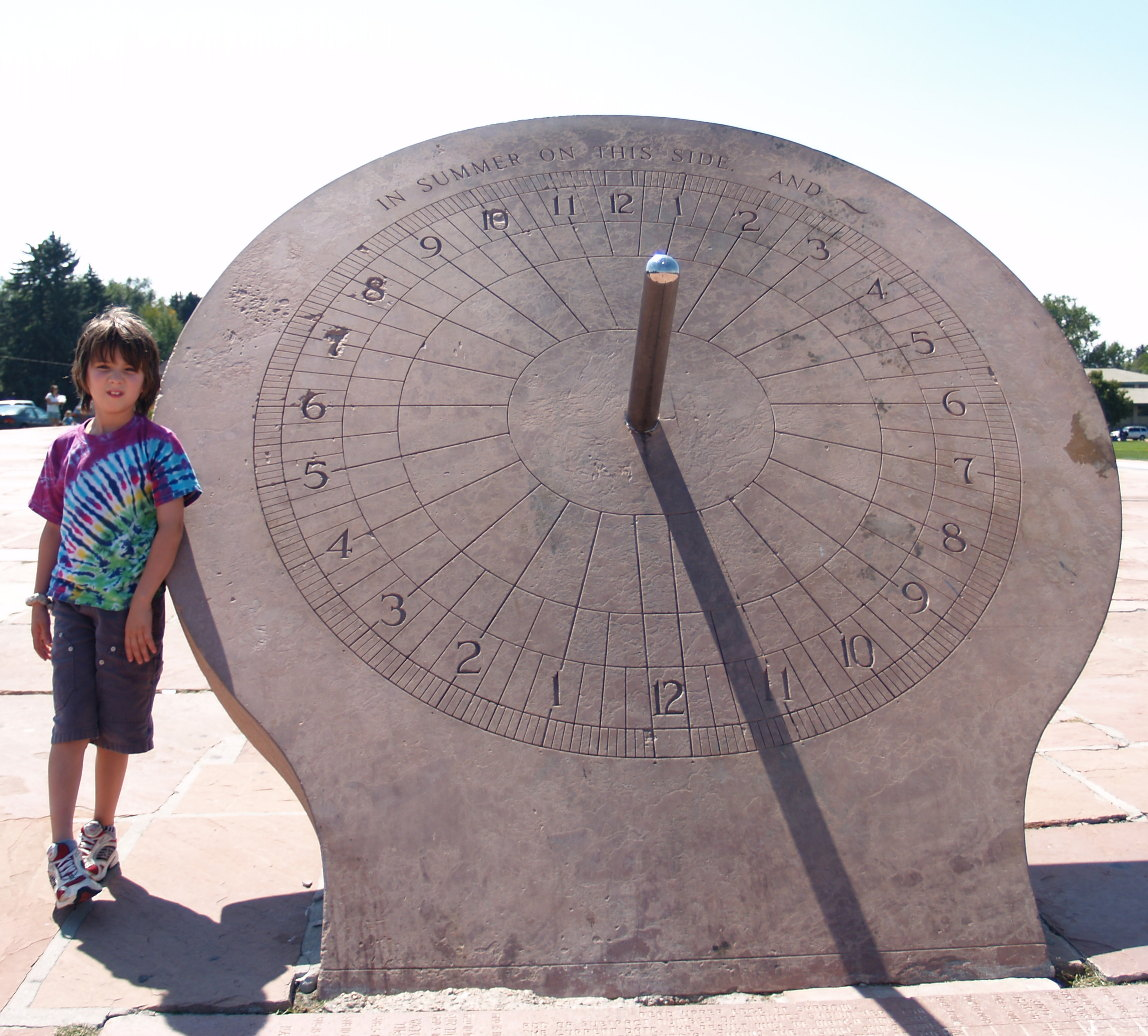
- Sundial at Cranmer Park

- Location within Colorado Location within the United States
- Location: Roughly bounded by E. Third Ave., Cherry St., E. First Ave., and Bellaire St., Denver, Colorado, United States
- Coordinates: 39°43′10″N 104°56′6″W
- Area: 24.3 acres (9.8 ha)
- Built: 1919
- MPS: Denver Park and Parkway System TR
- NRHP reference No.: 86002216
- CSRHP No.: 5DV.5313
- Added to NRHP: September 17, 1986

Cranmer Park is a city park in Denver, United States located in the Hilltop neighborhood off Colorado Boulevard between East 1st and East 3rd Avenue. It is notable for its large sundial.

An inscription at the base describes the axis of the gnomon as elevated 39°43' in the direction of polar north. The stone is perpendicular to the gnomon at 50°17', which makes it parallel to the equator. The south side of the stone is similarly marked for wintertime observation.

A polar chart at the base of the sundial describes the zodiac and degrees of the sun's position, and how to set a clock based on the gnomon's shadow. For winter viewing, the chart continues on the south side of the stone.

== History of the sundial ==
The current sundial is the second one to exist at this location in the park. The first was donated in 1941 by longtime Manager of Denver Parks George E. Cranmer, for whom the park is named. It was destroyed by vandals who exploded dynamite under it in September 1965. The replacement sundial was installed in March, 1966 after a successful citywide fundraising effort led by the Denver Junior Chamber of Commerce. It was restored again in 2018 to repair cracking stones.

The park is on the National Register of Historic Places.
