= List of populated places in Colorado: G–O =

The location of the State of Colorado in the United States of America.

The 64 counties of the U.S. State of Colorado

See also the List of populated places in Colorado by county.

This is a list of more than 3,800 currently, or formerly, inhabited places in the U.S. State of Colorado. (Note: This list includes 1913 Colorado places selectively downloaded from the Geographic Names Information System on October 15, 2023.)
Currently inhabited places in Colorado include the:

- 273 municipalities from the List of municipalities in Colorado
- 210 census-designated places from the List of census-designated places in Colorado
- 64 counties from the List of counties in Colorado.
- 8 military bases from the List of military installations in Colorado
- 2 Native American reservations from the List of Native American reservations in Colorado

This list also includes the current and extinct populated places found in the:

- Geographic Names Information System
- United States Geological Survey historic trail maps
- List of county seats in Colorado
- List of forts in Colorado
- List of ghost towns in Colorado
- List of National Register of Historic Places in Colorado
- List of post offices in Colorado
- List of trading posts in Colorado

- For important dates associated with many of these places, please see the List of municipalities in Colorado and the List of post offices in Colorado.
- For the ZIP Codes for many of these places, please see the List of post offices in Colorado.
- For the telephone area codes for many of these places, please see the List of Colorado telephone area codes.
- For all federally recognized place names in Colorado, please see the Geographic Names Information System.

	County
†	County seat
‡	Former county seat
#	State capital
⁂	Former territorial capital

Colorado populated places: A B C D E F G H I J K L M N O P Q R S T U V W X Y Z

== A–F ==
- List of populated places in Colorado: A through F

== G ==
Select the OpenStreetMap link at the right to view the location of places in this section.

Place	County	Type	Location	Elevation
Gabbert	Ouray	former post office		
Galatea	Kiowa	unincorporated community	38.5044°N 103.0246°W	4,383 feet (1,336 m)
Galena	Fremont	unincorporated community	38.2619°N 105.2778°W	7,946 feet (2,422 m)
Galena City	Hinsdale	see Capitol City		
Galeton	Weld	unincorporated community	40.5208°N 104.5858°W	4,770 feet (1,454 m)
Gantt's Picket Post	Bent	historic trading post		
Garcia	Costilla	unincorporated community	37.0042°N 105.5372°W	7,730 feet (2,356 m)
Garden City	Weld	statutory town	40.3939°N 104.6894°W	4,698 feet (1,432 m)
Gardner	Huerfano	census-designated place	37.7833°N 105.1656°W	6,969 feet (2,124 m)
Garfield	Chaffee	census-designated place	38.5493°N 106.2893°W	9,518 feet (2,901 m)
Garfield County		county	39.6003°N 107.9052°W	
Garibaldi	Saguache	see Villa Grove		
Garland	Costilla	former post office		
Garland City	Costilla	unincorporated community	37.4525°N 105.3422°W	8,127 feet (2,477 m)
Garnett	Alamosa	former post office		
Garo	Park	ghost town	39.1078°N 105.8903°W	9,196 feet (2,803 m)
Garrison	Alamosa	see Hooper		
Gary	Mesa	see Gilsonite		
Gary	Morgan	unincorporated community	40.0739°N 103.5849°W	4,380 feet (1,335 m)
Gaskil	Grand	unincorporated community	40.3305°N 105.8622°W	8,786 feet (2,678 m)
Gateview	Gunnison	unincorporated community	38.2936°N 107.2187°W	7,949 feet (2,423 m)
Gateway	Arapahoe	Aurora neighborhood		
Gateway	Douglas	unincorporated community	39.5492°N 104.9061°W	5,925 feet (1,806 m)
Gateway	Mesa	unincorporated community	38.6825°N 108.9751°W	4,616 feet (1,407 m)
Gateway Park	Adams	Aurora neighborhood	39.7436°N 104.8611°W	5,361 feet (1,634 m)
Gateway/Green Valley Ranch	Denver	Denver neighborhood		
Gato	Archuleta	ghost town	37.0450°N 107.1973°W	6,302 feet (1,921 m)
Gault	Weld	former post office		
Gavin	Mesa	former post office		
Geary	Weld	former post office		
Gebhard	Elbert	see Agate		
Gem	Bent	former post office		
Gem Village	La Plata	unincorporated community	37.2192°N 107.6373°W	6,831 feet (2,082 m)
Gems Park Estates	Jefferson	unincorporated community	39.5956°N 105.2367°W	7,290 feet (2,222 m)
Genesee	Jefferson	census-designated place	39.6858°N 105.2728°W	7,657 feet (2,334 m)
Genesee Ridge	Jefferson	unincorporated community	39.6814°N 105.2722°W	7,500 feet (2,286 m)
Genoa	Lincoln	statutory town	39.2783°N 103.5002°W	5,604 feet (1,708 m)
Georgetown† (Note: In 1867, county voters selected Georgetown as the new seat of Clear Creek County, Colorado Territory, and since statehood on August 1, 1876, the seat of Clear Creek County, Colorado.)	Clear Creek	territorial charter municipality	39.7061°N 105.6975°W	8,520 feet (2,597 m)
Gerbazdale	Pitkin	former post office		
Gerrard	Rio Grande	census-designated place	37.6783°N 106.5752°W	8,123 feet (2,476 m)
Gibson	Saguache	former post office		
Gilcrest	Weld	statutory town	40.2819°N 104.7777°W	4,754 feet (1,449 m)
Gill	Weld	unincorporated community	40.4541°N 104.5422°W	4,685 feet (1,428 m)
Gillespie	Jefferson	former post office		
Gillett	Las Animas	former post office		
Gillett	Teller	ghost town	38.7819°N 105.1228°W	9,938 feet (3,029 m)
Gillette	Teller	see Gillett		
Gilman	Eagle	ghost town	39.5328°N 106.3939°W	8,950 feet (2,728 m)
Gilman	Gunnison	see Doyleville		
Gilman	Jefferson	former post office		
Gilpin	Gilpin	unincorporated community	39.8908°N 105.5081°W	9,039 feet (2,755 m)
Gilpin County		county	39.8575°N 105.5226°W	
Gilson Gulch	Clear Creek	unincorporated community	39.7617°N 105.5081°W	8,950 feet (2,728 m)
Gilsonite	Mesa	unincorporated community	39.1769°N 108.7787°W	4,472 feet (1,363 m)
Girard	Lincoln	former post office		
Glacier	Gunnison	former post office		
Glacier Lake	Boulder	former post office		
Glade Park	Mesa	unincorporated community	38.9936°N 108.7409°W	6,906 feet (2,105 m)
Gladel	San Miguel	see Slick Rock		
Gladstone	San Juan	ghost town	37.8903°N 107.6503°W	10,505 feet (3,202 m)
Gladwyn	Archuleta	former post office		
Glen	Washington	former post office		
Glen Comfort	Larimer	unincorporated community	40.3936°N 105.4403°W	7,172 feet (2,186 m)
Glen Echo	Larimer	unincorporated community	40.6986°N 105.5853°W	7,162 feet (2,183 m)
Glen Eden	Routt	unincorporated community	40.7172°N 106.9150°W	7,274 feet (2,217 m)
Glen Eyrie	El Paso	unincorporated community	38.8917°N 104.8844°W	6,519 feet (1,987 m)
Glen Grove	Douglas	former post office		
Glen Haven	Larimer	unincorporated community	40.4539°N 105.4492°W	7,231 feet (2,204 m)
Glen Park	El Paso	unincorporated community	39.1144°N 104.9203°W	7,297 feet (2,224 m)
Glendale	Arapahoe	home rule city	39.7050°N 104.9336°W	5,351 feet (1,631 m)
Glendale	Boulder	census-designated place	40.0869°N 105.3715°W	7,359 feet (2,243 m)
Glendale	Fremont	see Penrose		
Glendevey	Larimer	unincorporated community	40.8103°N 105.9350°W	8,294 feet (2,528 m)
Gleneagle	El Paso	census-designated place	39.0453°N 104.8244°W	6,926 feet (2,111 m)
Gleneath	El Paso	former post office		
Glenelk	Jefferson	unincorporated community	39.4631°N 105.3564°W	7,808 feet (2,380 m)
Gleneyre	Larimer	former post office		
Glenham	Las Animas	see Barela		
Glenisle	Park	unincorporated community	39.4089°N 105.5097°W	8,054 feet (2,455 m)
Glenn	El Paso	former post office		
Glentivar	Park	unincorporated community	39.0478°N 105.6042°W	8,868 feet (2,703 m)
Glenwood Springs† (Note: On June 25, 1883, Defiance changed its name to Barlow, and several months later, county voters selected Barlow as the new seat of Garfield County, Colorado. On March 28, 1884, Barlow changed its name to Glenwood Springs, and Glenwood Springs continues to serve as county seat.)	Garfield	home rule city	39.5505°N 107.3248°W	5,761 feet (1,756 m)
Globeville (Note: On December 1, 1902, the newly created City and County of Denver annexed the towns of Argo, Berkeley, Elyria, Globeville, Montclair, and Valverde.)	Denver	Denver neighborhood	39.7819°N 104.9823°W	
Glory	Yuma	see Beecher Island		
Godfrey	Elbert	see Beuck		
Godfrey Ranch	Logan	see Fort Wicked		
Goff	Kit Carson	former post office		
Golconda	Montezuma	unincorporated community	37.4575°N 108.1523°W	9,163 feet (2,793 m)
Gold Dirt	Gilpin	former post office		
Gold Hill	Boulder	census-designated place	40.0633°N 105.4096°W	8,248 feet (2,514 m)
Gold Hill	Summit	unincorporated community	39.5453°N 106.0484°W	9,347 feet (2,849 m)
Gold Park	Eagle	ghost town		
Gold Run	Boulder	unincorporated community	40.0542°N 105.4114°W	8,127 feet (2,477 m)
Golddale	Douglas	former post office		
Golden† (Note: On November 6, 1860, the Provisional Government of the Territory of Jefferson designated Golden City as the new seat of Jefferson County, Jefferson Territory, and on November 13, 1860, it designated Golden City as its new territorial capital. On November 1, 1861, the new Territory of Colorado created 17 original counties, with Golden City as the original seat of Jefferson County, Colorado Territory. Golden City served as the third capital of the Colorado Territory from August 14, 1862, until December 9, 1967. On June 27, 1876, Golden City shortened its name to Golden, and since statehood on August 1, 1876, Golden has been the seat of Jefferson County, Colorado.)	Jefferson	home rule city	39.7555°N 105.2211°W	5,673 feet (1,729 m)
Golden City ⁂	Jefferson	see Golden		
Golden Gate	Jefferson	former post office		
Golden Heights	Jefferson	Golden neighborhood	39.7200°N 105.1794°W	5,988 feet (1,825 m)
Golden Meadows	Jefferson	unincorporated community	39.5778°N 105.2267°W	7,405 feet (2,257 m)
Golden Triangle	Denver	Denver neighborhood		
Goldenwest Park	Arapahoe	Littleton neighborhood	39.5858°N 105.0194°W	5,463 feet (1,665 m)
Goldfield	Teller	census-designated place	38.7176°N 105.1253°W	9,931 feet (3,027 m)
Goldhill	Boulder	see Gold Hill		
Goldrock	El Paso	former post office		
Goldsmith	Denver	Denver neighborhood		
Gomers Mil	Elbert	former post office		
Goodell Corner	Larimer	unincorporated community	40.7353°N 105.5811°W	8,156 feet (2,486 m)
Gooding	Boulder	unincorporated community	40.0736°N 105.0830°W	4,993 feet (1,522 m)
Goodnight	Pueblo	unincorporated community	38.2611°N 104.6700°W	4,774 feet (1,455 m)
Goodpasture	Pueblo	unincorporated community	38.0833°N 104.9200°W	6,115 feet (1,864 m)
Goodrich	Morgan	unincorporated community	40.3511°N 104.0616°W	4,383 feet (1,336 m)
Gordon	Huerfano	former post office		
Gorham	Boulder	see Marshall		
Gotera	Las Animas	see Lone Oak		
Gothic	Gunnison	ghost town	38.9592°N 106.9898°W	9,485 feet (2,891 m)
Gould	Jackson	unincorporated community	40.5264°N 106.0267°W	8,921 feet (2,719 m)
Gove	Custer	former post office		
Gowanda	Weld	unincorporated community	40.2047°N 104.9005°W	4,790 feet (1,460 m)
Graceland	Elbert	former post office		
Gradens	Montezuma	former post office		
Graft	Baca	unincorporated community	37.4478°N 102.8924°W	4,783 feet (1,458 m)
Graham	Weld	former post office		
Granada	Prowers	statutory town	38.0639°N 102.3105°W	3,484 feet (1,062 m)
Granada War Relocation Center	Prowers	see Amache National Historic Site		
Granby	Grand	statutory town	40.0861°N 105.9395°W	7,976 feet (2,431 m)
Grand County		county	40.1025°N 106.1181°W	
Grand Island	Boulder	ghost town	39.9708°N 105.6033°W	9,505 feet (2,897 m)
Grand Junction† (Note: On May 26, 1882, Ute changed its name to Grand Junction. Grand Junction has been the seat of Mesa County, Colorado since the county was created on February 11, 1883.)	Mesa	home rule city	39.0639°N 108.5506°W	4,590 feet (1,399 m)
Grand Lake‡ (Note: Grand Lake served as the seat of Grand County, Colorado from 1882 until 1888. On June 30, 1895, Grand Lake changed its name to Grandlake; then changed it back to Grand Lake on April 1, 1938.)	Grand	statutory town	40.2522°N 105.8231°W	8,386 feet (2,556 m)
Grand Valley	Garfield	see Parachute		
Grand View Estates	Douglas	census-designated place	39.5436°N 104.8211°W	5,820 feet (1,774 m)
Grandlake	Grand	see Grand Lake		
Grandview	La Plata	unincorporated community	37.2275°N 107.8270°W	6,785 feet (2,068 m)
Graneros	Pueblo	former post office		
Granger	El Paso	former post office		
Granger	Rio Grande	former post office		
Granite‡ (Note: In 1868, county voters selected Granite as the new seat of Lake County, Colorado Territory, and after statehood on August 1, 1876, the seat of Lake County, Colorado. On February 8, 1879, the state changed the name of Lake County to Carbonate County for just two days. After two days, the state created Chaffee County, Colorado and designated Granite as the original county seat, serving until 1888.)	Chaffee	unincorporated community	39.0436°N 106.2634°W	9,058 feet (2,761 m)
Granite Vale	Park	former post office		
Grant	Park	unincorporated community	39.4597°N 105.6617°W	8,606 feet (2,623 m)
Grant Village	Park	see Grant		
Grape	Fremont	former post office		
Grassy Hill	San Juan	former post office		
Gray	Washington	former post office		
Graycreek	Las Animas	former post office		
Graylin	Logan	former post office		
Graymont	Clear Creek	unincorporated community	39.6944°N 105.8006°W	9,764 feet (2,976 m)
Grays Ranch	Huerfano	former post office		
Great Divide	Moffat	former post office		
Greeley† (Note: Greeley served as the seat of Weld County, Colorado Territory from 1874 until 1875. Greeley has served as the seat of Weld County, Colorado since 1877.)	Weld	home rule city	40.4233°N 104.7091°W	4,675 feet (1,425 m)
Green	El Paso	see Green Mountain Falls		
Green	Saguache	former post office		
Green Canyon	Las Animas	former post office		
Green City	Weld	former post office		
Green Gables	Jefferson	Lakewood neighborhood	39.6783°N 105.0972°W	5,607 feet (1,709 m)
Green Knoll	Lincoln	former post office		
Green Mountain	Jefferson	Lakewood neighborhood	39.6883°N 105.1297°W	5,784 feet (1,763 m)
Green Mountain Falls	El Paso	statutory town	38.9350°N 105.0169°W	7,756 feet (2,364 m)
Green Mountain Falls	Teller	statutory town	38.9350°N 105.0169°W	7,756 feet (2,364 m)
Green Mountain Village	Jefferson	Lakewood neighborhood	39.6980°N 105.1325°W	5,823 feet (1,775 m)
Green Settlement	El Paso	unincorporated community	38.7755°N 104.8925°W	7,146 feet (2,178 m)
Green Valley	Jefferson	Wheat Ridge neighborhood	39.7814°N 105.0942°W	5,331 feet (1,625 m)
Green Valley Acres	Jefferson	unincorporated community	39.5022°N 105.3119°W	8,304 feet (2,531 m)
Green Valley Ranch	Denver	Denver neighborhood		
Greenhorn	Pueblo	unincorporated community	37.9070°N 104.8533°W	6,089 feet (1,856 m)
Greenland	Douglas	unincorporated community	39.1825°N 104.8553°W	6,906 feet (2,105 m)
Greenwood	Custer	unincorporated community	38.2050°N 105.0969°W	6,470 feet (1,972 m)
Greenwood Village	Arapahoe	home rule city	39.6172°N 104.9508°W	5,469 feet (1,667 m)
Grenada	Prowers	see Granada		
Gresham	Boulder	former post office		
Gresham	Garfield	former post office		
Greystone	Moffat	unincorporated community	40.6094°N 108.6740°W	6,660 feet (2,030 m)
Griffth	La Plata	ghost town	37.2144°N 107.7962°W	6,903 feet (2,104 m)
Grimaldi	Pueblo	former post office		
Grinnell	Las Animas	former post office		
Grommet	La Plata	see Oxford		
Grote	Prowers	unincorporated community	38.0872°N 102.4157°W	3,530 feet (1,076 m)
Grotto	Jefferson	former post office		
Grover	Weld	statutory town	40.8714°N 104.2252°W	5,075 feet (1,547 m)
Guadaloupe‡ (Note: On November 1, 1861, the Territory of Colorado created 17 original counties, with Guadaloupe as the original seat of Guadaloupe County, Colorado Territory. After only six days, the territory changed the name of the county to Conejos County, and Guadaloupe continued to serve as county seat until 1863.) (Note: Created by the Territory of Colorado as one of its original 17 counties on November 1, 1861, the name of Guadaloupe County was changed to Conejos County after only six days.)	Conejos	see Guadalupe		
Guadalupe	Conejos	unincorporated community	37.0953°N 106.0256°W	7,900 feet (2,408 m)
Guffey	Park	census-designated place	38.7591°N 105.5024°W	8,891 feet (2,710 m)
Gulch	Boulder	former post office		
Gulch	Pitkin	former post office		
Gulnare	Las Animas	unincorporated community	37.3172°N 104.7519°W	6,982 feet (2,128 m)
Gun Club Estates	Arapahoe	unincorporated community	39.7000°N 104.7117°W	5,610 feet (1,710 m)
Gunbarrel	Boulder	census-designated place	40.0655°N 105.1875°W	5,210 feet (1,588 m)
Gunnison† (Note: Gunnison has been the seat of Gunnison County, Colorado since the county was created on March 9, 1877.)	Gunnison	home rule city	38.5458°N 106.9253°W	7,703 feet (2,348 m)
Gunnison County		county	38.6664°N 107.0319°W	
Gurney	Yuma	former post office		
Guston	Ouray	ghost town	37.9164°N 107.6903°W	10,846 feet (3,306 m)
Gwillimsville	El Paso	ghost town		
Gypsum	Eagle	home rule town	39.6469°N 106.9517°W	6,312 feet (1,924 m)

== H ==
Select the OpenStreetMap link at the right to view the location of places in this section.

Place	County	Type	Location	Elevation
Hackberry Hills	Jefferson	Arvada neighborhood	39.8289°N 105.0781°W	5,505 feet (1,678 m)
Hadley	Otero	unincorporated community	38.0383°N 103.4033°W	3,993 feet (1,217 m)
Hahns Peak‡ (Note: Hahns Peak served as the seat of Routt County, Colorado from 1878 until 1912.)	Routt	see Hahns Peak Village		
Hahns Peak Village‡	Routt	unincorporated community	40.8056°N 106.9442°W	8,132 feet (2,479 m)
Hale	Denver	Denver neighborhood		
Hale	Yuma	unincorporated community	39.6297°N 102.1427°W	3,606 feet (1,099 m)
Hall Valley	Park	see Hallvale		
Hallcrafts Village East	Arapahoe	Aurora neighborhood	39.6931°N 104.8389°W	5,551 feet (1,692 m)
Hallvale	Park	former post office		
Hamilton	Moffat	unincorporated community	40.3672°N 107.6131°W	6,243 feet (1,903 m)
Hamilton	Park	ghost town		
Hammond	Park	former post office		
Hampden	Denver	Denver neighborhood		
Hampden South	Denver	Denver neighborhood		
Hancock	Chaffee	ghost town	38.6397°N 106.3608°W	11,053 feet (3,369 m)
Hang Town	San Miguel	former post office		
Hanover	Kit Carson	former post office		
Hanover	San Miguel	former post office		
Happy Canyon	Douglas	unincorporated community	39.4350°N 104.8705°W	6,407 feet (1,953 m)
Happy Canyon Ranches	Douglas	unincorporated community	39.4416°N 104.8639°W	6,532 feet (1,991 m)
Happy Valley	Boulder	see Eldora		
Happy Valley Gardens	Jefferson	Wheat Ridge neighborhood	39.7767°N 105.1044°W	5,354 feet (1,632 m)
Happyville	Yuma	former post office		
Harbor Pointe	Arapahoe	Aurora neighborhood	39.6367°N 104.8250°W	5,682 feet (1,732 m)
Harbourdale	Bent	former post office		
Hardin	Weld	unincorporated community	40.3511°N 104.4255°W	4,528 feet (1,380 m)
Hardscrabble	Custer	ghost town		
Hardscrabble	Routt	former post office		
Hargisville	Elbert	former post office		
Harlow	Mesa	former post office		
Harman (Note: The City of Denver annexed the Town of Harman on February 20, 1895.)	Denver	former statutory town	39.7226°N 104.9510°W	
Harris	Adams	see Westminster		
Harris Park	Adams	Westminster neighborhood	39.8319°N 105.0383°W	5,331 feet (1,625 m)
Harris Park	Park	unincorporated community	39.5117°N 105.4911°W	8,852 feet (2,698 m)
Harrisburg	Washington	see Lindon		
Harrison	Routt	former post office		
Harry Parker Place	Gunnison	unincorporated community	39.0522°N 107.4692°W	7,487 feet (2,282 m)
Hartman	Prowers	statutory town	38.1203°N 102.2199°W	3,599 feet (1,097 m)
Hartsel	Park	census-designated place	39.0217°N 105.7958°W	8,871 feet (2,704 m)
Harvey Park	Denver	Denver neighborhood		
Harvey Park South	Denver	Denver neighborhood		
Haskill	San Miguel	former post office		
Hastings	Las Animas	former post office		
Hasty	Bent	census-designated place	38.0999°N 102.9639°W	3,924 feet (1,196 m)
Haswell	Kiowa	statutory town	38.4522°N 103.1630°W	4,544 feet (1,385 m)
Hatton	Fremont	former post office		
Hauman	Saguache	see Orient		
Havana Village	Arapahoe	Aurora neighborhood	39.7000°N 104.8597°W	5,479 feet (1,670 m)
Haverly	Gunnison	former post office		
Hawkhurst	Mesa	see Collbran		
Hawkins	Kiowa	unincorporated community	38.4939°N 102.9324°W	4,350 feet (1,326 m)
Hawley	Otero	unincorporated community	37.9828°N 103.7111°W	4,199 feet (1,280 m)
Haworth	Jackson	former post office		
Hawthorne	Boulder	see Eldorado Springs		
Haxtum	Phillips	see Haxtun		
Haxtun	Phillips	statutory town	40.6411°N 102.6269°W	4,029 feet (1,228 m)
Haybro	Routt	ghost town	40.3322°N 106.9595°W	7,297 feet (2,224 m)
Hayden‡ (Note: On January 29, 1877, the state created Routt County, Colorado and designated Hayden as the original county seat. Hayden served as county seat until 1878.)	Routt	home rule town	40.4953°N 107.2573°W	6,348 feet (1,935 m)
Hayden Creek	Fremont	see Coaldale		
Hayman	Park	unincorporated community		
Haynes Ranch	Pueblo	former post office		
Haywood	Summit	former post office		
Hazeltine	Adams	Commerce City neighborhood	39.8967°N 104.8830°W	5,052 feet (1,540 m)
Hazeltine Heights	Adams	unincorporated community	39.8855°N 104.8897°W	5,082 feet (1,549 m)
Heartstrong	Yuma	unincorporated community	39.9475°N 102.5769°W	4,072 feet (1,241 m)
Heather Ridge	Arapahoe	Aurora neighborhood	39.6772°N 104.8408°W	5,584 feet (1,702 m)
Heathton	Fremont	former post office		
Hebron	Jackson	unincorporated community	40.5961°N 106.4070°W	8,143 feet (2,482 m)
Hecla	Garfield	former post office		
Heeney	Summit	census-designated place	39.8740°N 106.3078°W	8,018 feet (2,444 m)
Heiberger	Mesa	unincorporated community	39.2689°N 107.8023°W	7,133 feet (2,174 m)
Helena	Chaffee	former post office		
Henderson	Adams	Commerce City neighborhood	39.9205°N 104.8658°W	5,023 feet (1,531 m)
Henderson	Sedgwick	see Sedgwick		
Henderson Island (Note: Henderson Island is now the Adams County Fairground.)	Adams	ghost town	39.9300°N 104.8687°W	5,010 feet (1,527 m)
Hendricks	Fremont	see Coaldale		
Henry	Alamosa	unincorporated community	37.3983°N 105.9070°W	7,552 feet (2,302 m)
Henry	Lake	former post office		
Henry	Rio Grande	see Monte Vista		
Henry	Washington	former post office		
Henson	Hinsdale	ghost town	38.0208°N 107.3770°W	9,236 feet (2,815 m)
Herad	Saguache	former post office		
Hereford	Weld	unincorporated community	40.9750°N 104.3058°W	5,279 feet (1,609 m)
Heritage	Arapahoe	former post office		
Heritage Dells	Jefferson	Golden neighborhood	39.7194°N 105.2125°W	6,161 feet (1,878 m)
Heritage Hills	Douglas	Lone Tree neighborhood	39.5433°N 104.8789°W	5,915 feet (1,803 m)
Heritage Hills CDP	Douglas	see Heritage Hills		
Hermes	Yuma	former post office		
Hermit	Hinsdale	former post office		
Hermitage	Dolores	former post office		
Hermitage	Grand	former post office		
Hermosa	La Plata	unincorporated community	37.4153°N 107.8353°W	6,644 feet (2,025 m)
Hermosilla	Huerfano	former post office		
Hermosilla	Pueblo	former post office		
Hermosville	Huerfano	former post office		
Herndon	Jefferson	former post office		
Herzman Mesa	Jefferson	unincorporated community	39.6105°N 105.3103°W	7,598 feet (2,316 m)
Hesperus	La Plata	unincorporated community	37.2861°N 108.0395°W	8,091 feet (2,466 m)
Hessie	Boulder	ghost town	39.9550°N 105.6000°W	9,045 feet (2,757 m)
Hester	Crowley	former post office		
Hewit	La Plata	former post office		
Heywood	Chaffee	see Hortense		
Hezron	Huerfano	former post office		
Hiawatha	Moffat	unincorporated community	40.9883°N 108.6204°W	7,149 feet (2,179 m)
Hibbard	El Paso	see Drennan		
Hickman	Custer	former post office		
Hicks	Las Animas	former post office		
Hidden Creek Park	Adams	Westminster neighborhood	39.8381°N 105.0428°W	5,384 feet (1,641 m)
Hidden Lake	Boulder	census-designated place	40.1100°N 105.4786°W	8,757 feet (2,669 m)
Hidden Valley	Jefferson	unincorporated community	39.6947°N 105.3392°W	7,759 feet (2,365 m)
Hidden Village	Douglas	unincorporated community	39.4634°N 104.7074°W	6,368 feet (1,941 m)
Hideaway Park	Grand	Winter Park neighborhood	39.9180°N 105.7856°W	8,802 feet (2,683 m)
Higbee	Otero	unincorporated community	37.7764°N 103.4594°W	4,236 feet (1,291 m)
Higgins	Chaffee	former post office		
Higgins	Las Animas	former post office		
High Mar	Boulder	Longmont neighborhood		
Highland	Denver	Denver neighborhood		
Highland Gardens	Jefferson	Wheat Ridge neighborhood	39.7675°N 105.0628°W	5,433 feet (1,656 m)
Highland Lake	Weld	unincorporated community	40.2478°N 105.0144°W	5,072 feet (1,546 m)
Highland Mary	San Juan	former post office		
Highland Park	Arapahoe	Aurora neighborhood	39.7214°N 104.8600°W	5,430 feet (1,655 m)
Highland Park	Denver	Denver neighborhood	39.7608°N 105.0181°W	5,312 feet (1,619 m)
Highland Park	Mesa	unincorporated community	39.0919°N 108.4815°W	4,718 feet (1,438 m)
Highland Park	Park	unincorporated community	39.4989°N 105.5292°W	8,957 feet (2,730 m)
Highlandlake	Weld	see Highland Lake		
Highlands (Note: The City of Denver annexed the Town of Highlands on July 24, 1896.)	Denver	former statutory town	39.7512°N 105.0252°W	
Highlands Ranch	Douglas	census-designated place	39.5539°N 104.9694°W	5,696 feet (1,736 m)
Highlandtown	Denver	see Highlands		
Highmore	Garfield	former post office		
Higho	Jackson	former post office		
Highpark	Teller	former post office		
Highpoint	Arapahoe	Aurora neighborhood	39.6458°N 104.7647°W	5,738 feet (1,749 m)
Hi-Land Acres	Adams	unincorporated community	39.9883°N 104.8775°W	5,141 feet (1,567 m)
Hill Top	Douglas	see Hilltop		
Hillcrest	Adams	Aurora neighborhood		
Hillcrest Heights	Jefferson	Wheat Ridge neighborhood	39.7789°N 105.0861°W	5,384 feet (1,641 m)
Hillcrest Village	Adams	Aurora neighborhood	39.7461°N 104.8211°W	5,358 feet (1,633 m)
Hillerton	Gunnison	former post office		
Hillrose	Morgan	statutory town	40.3258°N 103.5219°W	4,170 feet (1,271 m)
Hillsboro	Weld	unincorporated community	40.3328°N 104.8644°W	4,744 feet (1,446 m)
Hillsborough	Weld	see Hillsboro		
Hillsdale	Fremont	former post office		
Hillside	Arapahoe	Aurora neighborhood	39.7336°N 104.8669°W	5,381 feet (1,640 m)
Hillside	Fremont	unincorporated community	38.2653°N 105.6117°W	7,490 feet (2,283 m)
Hillside Manor	Arapahoe	Littleton neighborhood	39.6206°N 105.0397°W	5,436 feet (1,657 m)
Hilltop	Denver	Denver neighborhood		
Hilltop	Douglas	unincorporated community	39.4517°N 104.6814°W	6,578 feet (2,005 m)
Hilton	Bent	unincorporated community	38.0703°N 103.0610°W	3,875 feet (1,181 m)
Hiltonville	Weld	former post office		
Hinsdale County		county	37.8208°N 107.3004°W	
Hirst	Alamosa	former post office		
Hiwan Hills	Jefferson	unincorporated community	39.6403°N 105.3300°W	7,343 feet (2,238 m)
Hobart	Teller	former post office		
Hobson	Pueblo	unincorporated community	38.3408°N 104.9344°W	4,941 feet (1,506 m)
Hoehne	Las Animas	census-designated place	37.2814°N 104.3891°W	5,738 feet (1,749 m)
Hoffman Heights	Arapahoe	Aurora neighborhood		
Hogg	Montezuma	former post office		
Holbrook	Otero	former post office		
Holden	Pueblo	former post office		
Holiday Hills Village	Adams	Federal Heights neighborhood	39.8661°N 105.0086°W	5,351 feet (1,631 m)
Holland	Park	former post office		
Holly	Prowers	statutory town	38.0522°N 102.1227°W	3,392 feet (1,034 m)
Holly Hills	Arapahoe	census-designated place	39.6676°N 104.9180°W	5,505 feet (1,678 m)
Hollywood	Teller	unincorporated community	38.7094°N 105.1333°W	9,692 feet (2,954 m)
Holtwold	Elbert	former post office		
Holy Cross	Eagle	see Holy Cross City		
Holy Cross City	Eagle	ghost town	39.4150°N 106.4781°W	11,427 feet (3,483 m)
Holyoke† (Note: Holyoke has been the seat of Phillips County, Colorado since the county was created on March 27, 1889.)	Phillips	home rule city	40.5844°N 102.3024°W	3,737 feet (1,139 m)
Home	Larimer	former post office		
Homelake	Rio Grande	unincorporated community	37.5756°N 106.0970°W	7,638 feet (2,328 m)
Homestead Heights	Adams	unincorporated community	39.8611°N 105.0139°W	5,469 feet (1,667 m)
Homestead Hills	Douglas	unincorporated community	39.5314°N 104.7297°W	6,165 feet (1,879 m)
Homewood Park	Jefferson	unincorporated community	39.5428°N 105.1978°W	6,719 feet (2,048 m)
Honnold	Larimer	former post office		
Hooper	Alamosa	statutory town	37.7428°N 105.8753°W	7,559 feet (2,304 m)
Hoopup	Las Animas	former post office		
Hoovers Corner	Montrose	unincorporated community	38.6069°N 108.0590°W	5,449 feet (1,661 m)
Hope	Lake	see Snowden		
Hope	Mesa	former post office		
Horace	El Paso	former post office		
Horse Shoe	Park	see Horseshoe		
Horsefly	Montrose	see Holy Cross City		
Horseshoe	Park	ghost town	39.2039°N 106.0853°W	10,558 feet (3,218 m)
Horsetooth Heights	Larimer	unincorporated community	40.5044°N 105.1541°W	5,509 feet (1,679 m)
Hortense	Chaffee	former post office		
Hot Spring	Ouray	former post office		
Hot Sulphur Springs† (Note: Hot Sulphur Springs served as the original seat of Grand County, Colorado Territory since the county was created on February 2, 1874, and with statehood on August 1, 1876, the seat of Grand County, Colorado until 1882 and then again from 1888 to present. On June 26, 1894, Hot Sulphur Springs changed its name to Sulphur Springs, then changed it back to Hot Sulphur Springs on February 15, 1912.)	Grand	statutory town	40.0730°N 106.1028°W	7,730 feet (2,356 m)
Hotchkiss	Delta	statutory town	38.7997°N 107.7195°W	5,331 feet (1,625 m)
Houck	Huerfano	former post office		
Houser Cow Camp	Montrose	unincorporated community	38.3294°N 108.3056°W	8,517 feet (2,596 m)
Houston	Weld	unincorporated community	40.2547°N 104.8069°W	4,783 feet (1,458 m)
Howard	Fremont	census-designated place	38.4098°N 105.8424°W	7,405 feet (2,257 m)
Howardsville‡ (Note: Howardsville served as the original seat of La Plata County, Colorado Territory since the county was created on February 10, 1874, until January 31, 1876.)	San Juan	ghost town	37.8356°N 107.5942°W	9,747 feet (2,971 m)
Howbert	Park	former post office		
Howeville	Gunnison	see Jacks Cabin		
Howland	Lake	former post office		
Hoyt	Kit Carson	former post office		
Hoyt	Morgan	unincorporated community	40.0155°N 104.0750°W	4,764 feet (1,452 m)
Hudson	Weld	statutory town	40.0736°N 104.6430°W	5,000 feet (1,524 m)
Huerfano (1862)	Huerfano	former post office		
Huerfano	Huerfano	former post office		
Huerfano	Pueblo	former post office		
Huerfano Cañon	Huerfano	see Farisita		
Huerfano Canyon	Huerfano	see Gardner		
Huerfano County		county	37.6847°N 104.9605°W	
Huggins	Routt	see Pallas		
Hughes	Adams	see Brighton		
Hughes	Yuma	former post office		
Hugo† (Note: Hugo has been the seat of Lincoln County, Colorado since the county was created on April 11, 1889.)	Lincoln	statutory town	39.1361°N 103.4699°W	5,039 feet (1,536 m)
Hukill	Clear Creek	former post office		
Humbar	Las Animas	former post office		
Hummel	Las Animas	former post office		
Huntington Heights	Jefferson	Arvada neighborhood	39.8244°N 105.0931°W	5,614 feet (1,711 m)
Huntsville	Douglas	see Larkspur		
Husted	El Paso	ghost town		
Hutchinson	Jefferson	see Conifer		
Hutchinson Heights	Arapahoe	Aurora neighborhood	39.6628°N 104.7842°W	5,640 feet (1,719 m)
Hydrate	Routt	former post office		
Hydraulic	Montrose	former post office		
Hygiene	Boulder	unincorporated community	40.1886°N 105.1808°W	5,089 feet (1,551 m)
Hynes	La Plata	former post office		

== I ==
Select the OpenStreetMap link at the right to view the location of places in this section.

Place	County	Type	Location	Elevation
Ibex	Lake	former post office		
Idaho‡ (Note: On November 1, 1861, the Territory of Colorado created 17 original counties, with Idaho as the original seat of Clear Creek County, Colorado Territory, serving until 1867. On April 7, 1876, Idaho changed its name to Idaho Springs.)	Clear Creek	see Idaho Springs		
Idaho City	Clear Creek	see Idaho Springs		
Idaho Springs‡	Clear Creek	statutory city	39.7425°N 105.5136°W	7,526 feet (2,294 m)
Idahoe	Clear Creek	see Idaho Springs		
Idalia	Yuma	census-designated place	39.7029°N 102.2938°W	3,967 feet (1,209 m)
Idaville	Park	see Guffey		
Ideal	Huerfano	former post office		
Idledale	Jefferson	census-designated place	39.6689°N 105.2432°W	6,598 feet (2,011 m)
Idylwilde	Larimer	unincorporated community	40.7008°N 105.6547°W	7,533 feet (2,296 m)
Ignacio (Note: Ignacio, Colorado, is the headquarters of the Southern Ute Indian Tribe.)	La Plata	statutory town	37.1150°N 107.6331°W	6,453 feet (1,967 m)
Iles Grove	Moffat	unincorporated community	40.3353°N 107.6873°W	6,309 feet (1,923 m)
Iliff	Logan	statutory town	40.7592°N 103.0666°W	3,835 feet (1,169 m)
Ilium	San Miguel	unincorporated community	37.9297°N 107.8978°W	8,117 feet (2,474 m)
Ilse	Custer	former post office		
Inche	Arapahoe	former post office		
Independence	Pitkin	ghost town	39.1072°N 106.6059°W	10,912 feet (3,326 m)
Independence	Teller	ghost town	38.7322°N 105.1366°W	10,640 feet (3,243 m)
Indian Creek	Denver	Denver neighborhood		
Indian Hills	Jefferson	census-designated place	39.6167°N 105.2372°W	6,850 feet (2,088 m)
Indian Meadows	Larimer	unincorporated community	40.7005°N 105.5519°W	7,034 feet (2,144 m)
Indian Springs Village	Jefferson	unincorporated community	39.4319°N 105.3206°W	7,228 feet (2,203 m)
Indian Tree	Jefferson	Arvada neighborhood		
Indianapolis	Las Animas	former post office		
Indians Hills	Jefferson	unincorporated community		
Insmont	Park	unincorporated community	39.3919°N 105.4531°W	7,710 feet (2,350 m)
Interlaken	Lake	former post office		
Inverness	Arapahoe	census-designated place	39.5774°N 104.8614°W	5,761 feet (1,756 m)
Inverness	Douglas	unincorporated community	39.5623°N 104.8629°W	5,797 feet (1,767 m)
Iola	Gunnison	ghost town	38.4750°N 107.0973°W	7,523 feet (2,293 m)
Ione	Weld	unincorporated community		
Ionia	Mesa	former post office		
Iris	Saguache	unincorporated community	38.4161°N 106.8289°W	8,999 feet (2,743 m)
Iron City	Chaffee	ghost town	38.7086°N 106.3381°W	9,902 feet (3,018 m)
Iron Spring	Otero	see Bloom		
Irondale	Adams	unincorporated community	39.8494°N 104.8972°W	5,138 feet (1,566 m)
Ironhill	Lake	former post office		
Ironsides	Boulder	former post office		
Ironton	Ouray	ghost town	37.9328°N 107.6803°W	9,800 feet (2,987 m)
Irving	Douglas	former post office		
Irwin	Gunnison	unincorporated community	38.8736°N 107.0970°W	10,197 feet (3,108 m)
Irwin Canyon	Las Animas	former post office	37.52801667°N 103.26276944°W	
Island Station	Adams	see Henderson		
Ivanhoe	Pitkin	former post office		
Ivywild	El Paso	Colorado Springs neighborhood	38.8105°N 104.8353°W	6,014 feet (1,833 m)

== J ==
Select the OpenStreetMap link at the right to view the location of places in this section.

Place	County	Type	Location	Elevation
Jack Rabbit	Moffat	former post office		
Jack Springs	Moffat	unincorporated community	40.3511°N 108.7032°W	7,113 feet (2,168 m)
Jacks Cabin	Gunnison	former post office		
Jackson	Gunnison	former post office		
Jackson	Pueblo	former post office		
Jackson County		county	40.6661°N 106.3424°W	
Jackson Diggings	Clear Creek	see Idaho Springs		
Jackson Lake	Morgan	census-designated place	40.3642°N 104.0719°W	4,406 feet (1,343 m)
Jamestown	Boulder	statutory town	40.1155°N 105.3886°W	6,946 feet (2,117 m)
Janeway	Pitkin	former post office		
Jansen	Las Animas	census-designated place	37.1572°N 104.5382°W	6,083 feet (1,854 m)
January	Teller	former post office		
Jaroso	Costilla	unincorporated community	37.0028°N 105.6242°W	7,579 feet (2,310 m)
Jaroso	Las Animas	former post office		
Jasper	Rio Grande	unincorporated community	37.4178°N 106.4625°W	9,108 feet (2,776 m)
Jefferson	Jefferson	see Morrison		
Jefferson	Park	unincorporated community	39.3772°N 105.8006°W	9,501 feet (2,896 m)
Jefferson County		county	39.5859°N 105.2506°W	
Jefferson Park	Denver	Denver neighborhood		
Jennison	San Juan	see Timber Hill		
Jimmy Camp	El Paso	see Jimmy's Camp		
Jimmy's Camp	El Paso	ghost town		
Joes	Yuma	census-designated place	39.6559°N 102.6785°W	4,275 feet (1,303 m)
Johnson Village	Chaffee	census-designated place	38.8108°N 106.1067°W	7,851 feet (2,393 m)
Johnstown	Weld	home rule town	40.3369°N 104.9122°W	4,852 feet (1,479 m)
Johnstown	Larimer	home rule town	40.3369°N 104.9122°W	4,852 feet (1,479 m)
Jones	Mesa	see Arlington, Mesa County		
Josie	Summit	see Naomi		
Joya	Conejos	former post office		
Joycoy	Baca	former post office		
Joylan	Jefferson	see Idledale		
Jual	Dolores	former post office		
Juanita	Archuleta	ghost town	37.0272°N 107.1506°W	6,375 feet (1,943 m)
Juanita	Pueblo	former post office		
Julesburg† (Note: On May 26, 1886, Denver Junction changed its name to Julesburg. Julesburg has been the seat of Sedgwick County, Colorado since the county was created on April 9, 1889.)	Sedgwick	statutory town	40.9883°N 102.2644°W	3,478 feet (1,060 m)
Julesburg (1860)	Sedgwick	former post office		
Julesburg (1864)	Sedgwick	former post office		
Julesburg (1886)	Sedgwick	statutory town		
Junction	Jefferson	former post office		
Junction	Morgan	see Fort Morgan		
Junction City	Routt	see Haybro		
Junction House	Morgan	former post office		
Juniata	Pueblo	former post office		
Juniper	Fremont	former post office		
Juniper	Moffat	see Juniper Hot Springs		
Juniper Hot Springs	Moffat	unincorporated community	40.4672°N 107.9537°W	5,991 feet (1,826 m)
Juniper Springs	Moffat	see Juniper Hot Springs		

== K ==
Select the OpenStreetMap link at the right to view the location of places in this section.

Place	County	Type	Location	Elevation
Kaiserhiem	Park	see Grousemont		
Kalbaugh	Fremont	former post office		
Kalous	Weld	former post office		
Kannah	Gunnison	former post office		
Kant	Las Animas	former post office		
Kanza	Elbert	former post office		
Karval	Lincoln	unincorporated community	38.7333°N 103.5372°W	5,115 feet (1,559 m)
Kassler	Jefferson	unincorporated community	39.4905°N 105.0947°W	5,499 feet (1,676 m)
Katrina	Las Animas	former post office		
Kauffman	Weld	former post office		
Kazan	Las Animas	former post office		
Kearns	Archuleta	unincorporated community	37.1311°N 107.1603°W	6,844 feet (2,086 m)
Keating	Custer	former post office		
Keble	Pueblo	former post office		
Keenesburg	Weld	statutory town	40.1083°N 104.5200°W	4,954 feet (1,510 m)
Kelim	Larimer	unincorporated community	40.4066°N 104.9508°W	4,938 feet (1,505 m)
Kelker	El Paso	Colorado Springs neighborhood	38.7958°N 104.7814°W	5,863 feet (1,787 m)
Keller	Bent	unincorporated community	38.0628°N 103.1463°W	3,871 feet (1,180 m)
Kelleys	Logan	former post office		
Kelly	Logan	former post office		
Kellytown	Douglas	unincorporated community	39.4814°N 104.9936°W	5,676 feet (1,730 m)
Ken Caryl	Jefferson	census-designated place	39.5758°N 105.1122°W	5,761 feet (1,756 m)
Ken Caryl Ranch North	Jefferson	unincorporated community	39.5953°N 105.1725°W	6,181 feet (1,884 m)
Kendrick	Lincoln	former post office		
Kennedy	Denver	Denver neighborhood		
Kenosha	Park	former post office		
Kenwood	Fremont	former post office		
Kenyon Corner	Larimer	unincorporated community	40.6394°N 105.0728°W	5,112 feet (1,558 m)
Keota	Weld	ghost town	40.7028°N 104.0752°W	4,964 feet (1,513 m)
Kerns	Larimer	unincorporated community	40.5075°N 104.9444°W	4,833 feet (1,473 m)
Kerper City	Saguache	unincorporated community	38.2828°N 106.1422°W	9,288 feet (2,831 m)
Kersey	Weld	statutory town	40.3875°N 104.5616°W	4,616 feet (1,407 m)
Kester	Park	former post office		
Keyson	Elbert	former post office		
Keysor	Elbert	former post office		
Keystone	Douglas	former post office		
Keystone	San Miguel	unincorporated community	37.9497°N 107.8776°W	8,681 feet (2,646 m)
Keystone	Summit	former statutory town	39.5991°N 105.9882°W	9,170 feet (2,795 m)
Keystone	Summit	home rule town	39.5994°N 105.9872°W	9,174 feet (2,796 m)
Keystone CDP	Summit	see Town of Keystone		
Keystone Ranch	Douglas	see Keystone, Douglas County		
Kezar	Gunnison	former post office		
Kilburn	Kiowa	former post office		
Kilburn	Larimer	former post office		
Kilroy	Las Animas	former post office		
Kim	Las Animas	statutory town	37.2467°N 103.3522°W	5,692 feet (1,735 m)
Kimberly Hills	Adams	Federal Heights neighborhood	39.8675°N 105.0186°W	5,430 feet (1,655 m)
Kimbrell	Saguache	former post office		
King	Park	former post office		
Kings Canyon	Jackson	ghost town	40.9269°N 106.2270°W	8,396 feet (2,559 m)
Kingsborough	Arapahoe	Aurora neighborhood	39.6708°N 104.7992°W	5,597 feet (1,706 m)
Kinikinik (Note: Kinikinik is a nine-letter palindrome.)	Larimer	unincorporated community	40.7125°N 105.7381°W	7,730 feet (2,356 m)
Kinkel	Pueblo	see Burnt Mill		
Kinsey	Grand	see Kremmling		
Kiowa† (Note: On February 2, 1874, the Territory of Colorado created Elbert County, Colorado Territory, with Kiowa as the county seat, and since statehood on August 1, 1876, the seat of Elbert County, Colorado.)	Elbert	home rule town	39.3472°N 104.4644°W	6,378 feet (1,944 m)
Kiowa County		county	38.4333°N 102.7405°W	
Kirk	Yuma	census-designated place	39.6127°N 102.5920°W	4,203 feet (1,281 m)
Kirkgaard Acres	Arapahoe	Aurora neighborhood	39.7347°N 104.7867°W	5,476 feet (1,669 m)
Kirkwell	Baca	unincorporated community	37.1486°N 102.9410°W	4,905 feet (1,495 m)
Kit Carson‡ (Note: Kit Carson served as the seat of Greenwood County, Colorado Territory for the four years it existed from February 11, 1870, until February 6, 1874.)	Cheyenne	statutory town	38.7611°N 102.7894°W	4,285 feet (1,306 m)
Kit Carson County		county	39.3056°N 102.6029°W	
Kittredge	Jefferson	census-designated place	39.6547°N 105.2997°W	6,916 feet (2,108 m)
Kline	La Plata	unincorporated community	37.1442°N 108.1195°W	6,942 feet (2,116 m)
Knob Hill	El Paso	Colorado Springs neighborhood	38.8400°N 104.7828°W	6,115 feet (1,864 m)
Koen	Prowers	unincorporated community	38.0714°N 102.3469°W	3,510 feet (1,070 m)
Koenig	Weld	former post office		
Kokomo	Summit	ghost town	39.4242°N 106.1897°W	10,696 feet (3,260 m)
Koldeway	Jefferson	Arvada neighborhood	39.8078°N 105.1031°W	5,358 feet (1,633 m)
Konantz	Baca	former post office		
Kraft	Chaffee	see Brown Cañon		
Krain	Chaffee	former post office		
Kremmling	Grand	statutory town	40.0589°N 106.3889°W	7,313 feet (2,229 m)
Kreybill	Bent	unincorporated community	38.1139°N 103.1005°W	3,904 feet (1,190 m)
Kuhns Crossing	Elbert	unincorporated community		
Kukkuk	Kit Carson	former post office		
Kuner	Weld	unincorporated community	40.3761°N 104.4905°W	4,583 feet (1,397 m)
Kutch	Elbert	unincorporated community	38.9105°N 103.8694°W	5,673 feet (1,729 m)

== L ==
Select the OpenStreetMap link at the right to view the location of places in this section.

Place	County	Type	Location	Elevation
L1	Montrose	former post office		
La Boca	La Plata	unincorporated community	37.0111°N 107.6020°W	6,168 feet (1,880 m)
La Foret	El Paso	unincorporated community	39.0094°N 104.7144°W	7,231 feet (2,204 m)
La Garita	Saguache	unincorporated community	37.8408°N 106.2467°W	7,828 feet (2,386 m)
La Isla	Conejos	unincorporated community	37.1054°N 105.9272°W	7,746 feet (2,361 m)
La Jara	Conejos	statutory town	37.2750°N 105.9603°W	7,605 feet (2,318 m)
La Junta† (Note: La Junta has been the seat of Otero County, Colorado since the county was created on March 25, 1889.)	Otero	home rule city	37.9850°N 103.5438°W	4,078 feet (1,243 m)
La Junta Army Air Field	Otero	historic U.S. Army air field	38.0467°N 103.5125°W	4,193 feet (1,278 m)
La Junta Gardens	Otero	census-designated place	37.9995°N 103.5536°W	4,065 feet (1,239 m)
La Plata	La Plata	unincorporated community	37.3972°N 108.0631°W	9,308 feet (2,837 m)
La Plata County		county	37.2864°N 107.8436°W	
La Plaza de los Leones	Huerfano	see Walsenburg		
La Plaza de los Manzanares	Costilla	see Garcia		
La Porte‡ (Note: On November 28, 1859, the Provisional Government of the Territory of Jefferson created 12 counties, with La Porte as the seat of Heele County, Jefferson Territory. On November 1, 1861, the new Territory of Colorado created 17 original counties, with La Porte as the original seat of Larimer County, Colorado Territory, serving until 1868. On December 21, 1894, La Porte changed its name to Laporte.)	Larimer	see Laporte		
La Posta	La Plata	unincorporated community	37.1253°N 107.8951°W	6,178 feet (1,883 m)
La Salle	Weld	see LaSalle		
La Sauses	Conejos	see Lasauses		
La Valley	Costilla	unincorporated community	37.1020°N 105.3478°W	8,543 feet (2,604 m)
La Veta	Huerfano	statutory town	37.5050°N 105.0078°W	7,037 feet (2,145 m)
La Veta Pass	Huerfano	see Veta Pass		
La Veta Pass	Conejos	see Veta Pass		
La Vista	Arapahoe	Aurora neighborhood	39.7300°N 104.8053°W	5,446 feet (1,660 m)
Laboca	La Plata	see La Boca		
Lado	Conejos	former post office		
Ladore	Moffat	see Lodore		
Lafayette	Boulder	home rule city	39.9936°N 105.0897°W	5,210 feet (1,588 m)
Laird	Yuma	census-designated place	40.0818°N 102.1019°W	3,406 feet (1,038 m)
Lake Arbor	Jefferson	Arvada neighborhood	39.8478°N 105.0769°W	5,436 feet (1,657 m)
Lake City† (Note: In 1875, county voters selected Lake City as the new seat of Hinsdale County, Colorado Territory, and since statehood on August 1, 1876, the seat of Hinsdale County, Colorado.)	Hinsdale	statutory town	38.0300°N 107.3153°W	8,661 feet (2,640 m)
Lake County		county	39.2023°N 106.3449°W	
Lake George	Park	unincorporated community	38.9797°N 105.3575°W	7,992 feet (2,436 m)
Lake Shore Park	Boulder	unincorporated community	39.9589°N 105.3669°W	7,605 feet (2,318 m)
Lake Station	Lincoln	former post office		
Lakecrest	Jefferson	Arvada neighborhood	39.8503°N 105.1200°W	5,571 feet (1,698 m)
Lakeshore	Hinsdale	former post office		
Lakeside	Denver	Denver neighborhood	39.7783°N 105.0594°W	5,361 feet (1,634 m)
Lakeside	Jefferson	statutory town	39.7772°N 105.0558°W	5,364 feet (1,635 m)
Lakeside	Summit	former statutory town	39.8525°N 106.2654°W	
Laketon	Elbert	former post office		
Lakeview	Jefferson	Wheat Ridge neighborhood	39.7811°N 105.0756°W	5,374 feet (1,638 m)
Lakeview Estates	Adams	Westminster neighborhood	39.8247°N 105.0481°W	5,299 feet (1,615 m)
Lakeview Meadows	Jefferson	Arvada neighborhood	39.8236°N 105.0764°W	5,486 feet (1,672 m)
Lakevista	Montezuma	former post office		
Lakewood	Boulder	former post office		
Lakewood	Jefferson	home rule city	39.7047°N 105.0814°W	5,518 feet (1,682 m)
Lamar† (Note: Lamar has been the seat of Prowers County, Colorado since the county was created on April 11, 1889.)	Prowers	home rule city	38.0872°N 102.6207°W	3,619 feet (1,103 m)
Lamar	Pueblo	former post office		
Lamar Heights	Jefferson	Arvada neighborhood		
Lamartine	Clear Creek	unincorporated community	39.7294°N 105.6167°W	10,407 feet (3,172 m)
Lamb	Jefferson	former post office		
Lamplighter	Jefferson	Arvada neighborhood	39.8300°N 105.1247°W	5,531 feet (1,686 m)
Lamport	Baca	former post office		
Lanark	Saguache	former post office		
Landsman	Kit Carson	former post office		
Landsman	Yuma	former post office		
Langdon	Teller	see Crystola		
Langford	Boulder	see Marshall		
Lansing	Yuma	former post office		
Laplata	La Plata	see La Plata		
Laporte‡	Larimer	census-designated place	40.6264°N 105.1378°W	5,062 feet (1,543 m)
Larand	Jackson	unincorporated community	40.6225°N 106.2928°W	8,212 feet (2,503 m)
Lariat	Rio Grande	see Monte Vista		
Larimer	Huerfano	see Mustang		
Larimer County		county	40.6662°N 105.4607°W	
Larkspur	Douglas	home rule town	39.2286°N 104.8872°W	6,726 feet (2,050 m)
Las Animas† (Note: On February 11, 1870, the Territory of Colorado created Bent County, Colorado Territory, with Las Animas serving as the original county seat for only a few months. Las Animas served as county seat again from 1872 until 1875, when the county seat was moved to West Las Animas. With statehood on August 1, 1876, West Las Animas became the seat of Bent County, Colorado. On September 4, 1886, West Las Animas changed its name to Las Animas, and Las Animas has served as the county seat since.)	Bent	statutory city	38.0667°N 103.2227°W	3,898 feet (1,188 m)
Las Animas County		county	37.3166°N 104.0391°W	
Las Mesitas	Conejos	unincorporated community	37.0645°N 106.1106°W	8,100 feet (2,469 m)
LaSalle (Note: The La Salle post office serves the Town of LaSalle.) (Note: The Town of La Salle changed the spelling of its name to LaSalle, although the State of Colorado, the United States Postal Service, and the United States Census Bureau continue to use the original spelling.)	Weld	statutory town	40.3489°N 104.7019°W	4,678 feet (1,426 m)
Lasauses	Conejos	unincorporated community	37.2667°N 105.7464°W	7,503 feet (2,287 m)
Lascar	Huerfano	unincorporated community	37.8250°N 104.7486°W	5,692 feet (1,735 m)
Last Chance	Washington	ghost town	39.7408°N 103.5916°W	4,820 feet (1,469 m)
Latham‡ (Note: On November 25, 1863, Cherokee City changed its name to Latham. Latham served as the seat of Weld County, Colorado Territory from 1868 until 1870.)	Weld	see Evans		
Laub	Las Animas	former post office		
Laura	Logan	former post office		
Laurette‡ (Note: On January 7, 1862, county voters selected Laurette as the new seat of Park County, Colorado Territory. On December 21, 1865, Laurette changed its name to Buckskin, commonly known as Buckskin Joe. Buckskin Joe served as county seat until November 7, 1867.)	Park	see Buckskin Joe		
Laurium	Summit	former post office		
Lavalley	Costilla	former post office		
Lavender	Bent	former post office		
Lavender	Dolores	former post office		
Laveta Pass	Costilla	see Veta Pass		
Lawrence	Ouray	former post office		
Lawrence	Teller	former post office		
Lawson	Clear Creek	unincorporated community	39.7658°N 105.6275°W	8,107 feet (2,471 m)
Lay	Moffat	unincorporated community	40.5266°N 107.8820°W	6,181 feet (1,884 m)
Lazear	Delta	census-designated place	38.7800°N 107.7817°W	5,446 feet (1,660 m)
Lazy Acres	Boulder	census-designated place	40.0933°N 105.3328°W	7,028 feet (2,142 m)
Le Roy	Logan	see Leroy		
Leader	Adams	unincorporated community	39.8994°N 104.0563°W	4,862 feet (1,482 m)
Leadville† (Note: Leadville has served as the seat of Lake County, Colorado since it was re-created on February 10, 1879.)	Lake	statutory city	39.2508°N 106.2925°W	10,157 feet (3,096 m)
Leadville Army Air Field	Lake	historic U.S. Army air field	39.2833°N 106.3333°W	9,873 feet (3,009 m)
Leadville North	Lake	census-designated place	39.2600°N 106.3113°W	9,990 feet (3,045 m)
Leal	Grand	unincorporated community	39.8103°N 106.0445°W	8,871 feet (2,704 m)
Leavick	Park	ghost town	39.1950°N 106.1375°W	11,243 feet (3,427 m)
Leawood	Jefferson	unincorporated community	39.6036°N 105.0636°W	5,472 feet (1,668 m)
Lebanon	Montezuma	unincorporated community	37.4572°N 108.5915°W	6,673 feet (2,034 m)
Lebanon	Pueblo	former post office		
Lees	Pueblo	former post office		
Left Hand	Boulder	former post office		
Lehigh	Douglas	former statutory town	39.4346°N 105.1226°W	
Lehman	Grand	former post office		
Lena	Arapahoe	former post office		
Lenado	Pitkin	ghost town	39.2425°N 106.7625°W	8,540 feet (2,603 m)
Leon	Mesa	former post office		
Leonard	San Miguel	ghost town	38.0639°N 108.0270°W	7,749 feet (2,362 m)
Leopard	San Miguel	see Sams		
Leroy	Logan	unincorporated community	40.5261°N 102.9141°W	4,380 feet (1,335 m)
Leslie	Washington	former post office		
Lester	Huerfano	former post office		
Levinson	Weld	former post office		
Lewis	Montezuma	census-designated place	37.5017°N 108.6601°W	6,726 feet (2,050 m)
Leyden	Jefferson	unincorporated community	39.8447°N 105.1842°W	5,656 feet (1,724 m)
Leyden Junction	Jefferson	Arvada neighborhood	39.8461°N 105.1483°W	5,673 feet (1,729 m)
Leyner	Boulder	census-designated place	40.0511°N 105.1074°W	5,033 feet (1,534 m)
Liberty	Baca	unincorporated community	37.3081°N 102.7238°W	4,623 feet (1,409 m)
Liberty	Rio Grande	see Parma		
Liberty	Saguache	ghost town	37.8603°N 105.5958°W	8,274 feet (2,522 m)
Liberty Bell	San Miguel	unincorporated community	37.9353°N 107.7956°W	8,829 feet (2,691 m)
Liggett	Boulder	unincorporated community	40.0450°N 105.1339°W	5,062 feet (1,543 m)
Lillian Springs	Logan	former post office		
Lily	Moffat	former post office		
Lime	Pueblo	former post office		
Limon	Lincoln	statutory town	39.2639°N 103.6922°W	5,377 feet (1,639 m)
Limon Station	Lincoln	see Limon		
Lincoln	Summit	unincorporated community	39.4875°N 105.9856°W	10,236 feet (3,120 m)
Lincoln City	Summit	see Lincoln		
Lincoln County		county	38.9870°N 103.5146°W	
Lincoln Hills	Gilpin	unincorporated community	39.9225°N 105.4583°W	8,186 feet (2,495 m)
Lincoln Park	Denver	Denver neighborhood		
Lincoln Park	Fremont	census-designated place	38.4292°N 105.2200°W	5,390 feet (1,643 m)
Lindon	Washington	unincorporated community	39.7394°N 103.4138°W	4,918 feet (1,499 m)
Link	Las Animas	former post office		
Linwood	Las Animas	former post office		
Littell	Fremont	former post office		
Little Beaver	Rio Blanco	former post office		
Little Orphan (Note: On September 12, 1865, Little Orphan changed its name to Badito. Badito served as the seat of Huerfano County, Colorado Territory from 1868 until 1874.)	Huerfano	see Badito		
Little Thompson	Larimer	see Berthoud		
Littleton† (Note: Voters selected Littleton as the seat of South Arapahoe County, Colorado, which was renamed and re-created on November 15, 1902. Littleton has remained the seat since the county name was changed back to Arapahoe County, Colorado on April 11, 1903.)	Arapahoe	home rule city	39.6133°N 105.0166°W	5,351 feet (1,631 m)
Littleton†	Douglas	home rule city	39.6133°N 105.0166°W	5,351 feet (1,631 m)
Littleton†	Jefferson	home rule city	39.6133°N 105.0166°W	5,351 feet (1,631 m)
Livermore	Larimer	unincorporated community	40.7944°N 105.2172°W	5,896 feet (1,797 m)
Living Springs	Adams	unincorporated community	39.8914°N 104.3005°W	5,072 feet (1,546 m)
Lizard Head	San Miguel	former post office		
Lobatos	Conejos	unincorporated community	37.0795°N 105.9489°W	7,792 feet (2,375 m)
Lochbuie	Weld	statutory town	40.0072°N 104.7161°W	5,020 feet (1,530 m)
Lochbuie	Adams	statutory town	40.0072°N 104.7161°W	5,020 feet (1,530 m)
Lockett	Saguache	former post office		
Loco	Kit Carson	former post office		
LoDo	Denver	Denver neighborhood		
Lodore	Moffat	former post office		
Log Lane Village	Morgan	statutory town	40.2705°N 103.8297°W	4,308 feet (1,313 m)
Logan	Arapahoe	former post office		
Logan	Yuma	former post office		
Logan County		county	40.7246°N 103.1101°W	
Logcabin	Larimer	former post office		
Loghill Village	Ouray	census-designated place	38.1953°N 107.7795°W	7,884 feet (2,403 m)
Logtown	La Plata	ghost town	37.5517°N 107.5914°W	11,562 feet (3,524 m)
Loma	Mesa	census-designated place	39.2075°N 108.8050°W	4,524 feet (1,379 m)
Loma	Rio Grande	former post office		
Loma Linda	La Plata	unincorporated community	37.2242°N 107.7959°W	6,946 feet (2,117 m)
Lombard	Clear Creek	former post office		
Lombard Village	Pueblo	unincorporated community	38.2250°N 104.5450°W	4,803 feet (1,464 m)
London	Park	former post office		
Lone Dome	Montezuma	see Lonedome		
Lone Oak	Las Animas	former post office		
Lone Pine Estates	Jefferson	unincorporated community	39.5950°N 105.2453°W	7,287 feet (2,221 m)
Lone Star	Washington	unincorporated community	40.3519°N 102.8513°W	4,206 feet (1,282 m)
Lone Tree	Douglas	home rule city	39.5314°N 104.8620°W	5,997 feet (1,828 m)
Lonedome	Montezuma	former post office		
Lonetree	Archuleta	unincorporated community	37.1681°N 107.1728°W	7,037 feet (2,145 m)
Longmont	Boulder	home rule city	40.1672°N 105.1019°W	4,980 feet (1,518 m)
Longmont	Weld	home rule city	40.1672°N 105.1019°W	4,980 feet (1,518 m)
Longs Peak	Larimer	former post office		
Longview	Jefferson	unincorporated community	39.4175°N 105.1939°W	6,227 feet (1,898 m)
Loretto	Denver	former post office		
Los Cerritos	Conejos	unincorporated community	37.1483°N 105.9109°W	7,713 feet (2,351 m)
Los Fuertes	Costilla	unincorporated community	37.1345°N 105.3797°W	8,205 feet (2,501 m)
Los Garcias	Costilla	see Garcia		
Los Mogotes	Saguache	former post office		
Los Pinos	La Plata	see Bayfield		
Los Pinos	Saguache	former post office		
Los Sauses	Conejos	see Lasauses		
Lost Trail	Hinsdale	former post office		
Louisville	Boulder	home rule city	39.9778°N 105.1319°W	5,338 feet (1,627 m)
Lourette	Lake	ghost town		
Louviers	Douglas	census-designated place	39.4778°N 105.0072°W	5,669 feet (1,728 m)
Love	Teller	former post office		
Loveland	Larimer	home rule city	40.3978°N 105.0750°W	4,987 feet (1,520 m)
Loveland Heights	Larimer	unincorporated community	40.3897°N 105.4642°W	7,306 feet (2,227 m)
Lowland	El Paso	see Wayne		
Lowry	Denver	Denver neighborhood		
Lowry Air Force Base	Denver	historic U.S. Air Force base		
Loyd	Moffat	unincorporated community	40.3036°N 107.7048°W	6,401 feet (1,951 m)
Loyton	Conejos	see Stunner		
Lubers	Bent	unincorporated community	38.1289°N 102.9244°W	3,875 feet (1,181 m)
Lucerne	Weld	unincorporated community	40.4819°N 104.6997°W	4,751 feet (1,448 m)
Lucky Seven Summer Homes	Mineral	unincorporated community	37.5839°N 106.7398°W	8,560 feet (2,609 m)
Ludlam	Yuma	former post office		
Ludlow	Las Animas	ghost town	37.3333°N 104.5833°W	6,283 feet (1,915 m)
Lujane	Montrose	unincorporated community	38.4872°N 107.7337°W	6,601 feet (2,012 m)
Lulu	Grand	see Lulu City		
Lulu City	Grand	ghost town		
Luslo	Lincoln	former post office		
Lycan	Baca	unincorporated community	37.6153°N 102.2007°W	3,862 feet (1,177 m)
Lyman	Arapahoe	former post office		
Lyndale Park	Jefferson	Arvada neighborhood	39.8164°N 105.0739°W	5,413 feet (1,650 m)
Lynn	Las Animas	census-designated place	37.4219°N 104.6431°W	6,358 feet (1,938 m)
Lyons	Boulder	statutory town	40.2247°N 105.2714°W	5,364 feet (1,635 m)
Lytle	El Paso	ghost town		

== M ==
Select the OpenStreetMap link at the right to view the location of places in this section.

Place	County	Type	Location	Elevation
Mace's Hole	Pueblo	see Beulah		
Mack	Mesa	unincorporated community	39.2239°N 108.8651°W	4,524 feet (1,379 m)
Macon	Teller	see Independence, Teller County		
Mad Creek	Routt	unincorporated community	40.5661°N 106.8884°W	6,732 feet (2,052 m)
Madrid	Las Animas	ghost town	37.1276°N 104.6413°W	6,286 feet (1,916 m)
Magic Mountain	Jefferson	former post office		
Magnolia	Adams	Aurora neighborhood	39.7667°N 104.8317°W	5,341 feet (1,628 m)
Magnolia	Boulder	unincorporated community	39.9939°N 105.3653°W	7,195 feet (2,193 m)
Maher	Montrose	unincorporated community	38.6450°N 107.5848°W	6,808 feet (2,075 m)
Mahonville	Chaffee	former post office		
Mainard	Mesa	see Loma		
Maine Ranch	Bent	former post office		
Maitland	Huerfano	unincorporated community	37.6567°N 104.8339°W	6,263 feet (1,909 m)
Majestic	Las Animas	former post office		
Majors	El Paso	former post office		
Malachite	Huerfano	ghost town	37.7544°N 105.2608°W	7,490 feet (2,283 m)
Maldonado	Las Animas	former post office		
Malta	Lake	ghost town	39.2294°N 106.3509°W	9,590 feet (2,923 m)
Mamre	Bent	former post office		
Manassa	Conejos	statutory town	37.1742°N 105.9375°W	7,687 feet (2,343 m)
Mancos	Montezuma	statutory town	37.3450°N 108.2892°W	7,028 feet (2,142 m)
Mancos Creek	Montezuma	former post office		
Manhattan	Larimer	ghost town	40.7322°N 105.6000°W	8,474 feet (2,583 m)
Manitou	El Paso	see Manitou Springs		
Manitou Park (1887)	Teller	see Woodland Park		
Manitou Park (1890)	El Paso	former post office		
Manitou Springs	El Paso	home rule city	38.8597°N 104.9172°W	6,358 feet (1,938 m)
Manoa	Fremont	former post office		
Manzanares	Costilla	see Garcia		
Manzanola	Otero	statutory town	38.1095°N 103.8661°W	4,255 feet (1,297 m)
Maple Grove	Boulder	unincorporated community	39.9636°N 105.0956°W	5,240 feet (1,597 m)
Maplewood Acres	Jefferson	Arvada neighborhood	39.8247°N 105.1225°W	5,433 feet (1,656 m)
Mar Lee	Denver	Denver neighborhood		
Marble	Gunnison	statutory town	39.0722°N 107.1889°W	7,992 feet (2,436 m)
Margaret	Costilla	former post office		
Mariano	Montezuma	unincorporated community	37.1794°N 108.8734°W	5,591 feet (1,704 m)
Mariano's Crossing	Larimer	see Fort Namaqua		
Marigold	Teller	unincorporated community	38.6611°N 105.2214°W	6,886 feet (2,099 m)
Marion	Garfield	former post office		
Marnel	Pueblo	former post office		
Marnett	Boulder	Longmont neighborhood	40.1683°N 105.1339°W	4,993 feet (1,522 m)
Marshall	Boulder	unincorporated community	39.9555°N 105.2297°W	5,512 feet (1,680 m)
Marshall Park	Clear Creek	former post office		
Marshalltown	Saguache	see Sargents		
Marshdale	Jefferson	unincorporated community	39.5925°N 105.3122°W	7,776 feet (2,370 m)
Marston	Denver	Denver neighborhood		
Martin	Bent	see Able		
Martin	Grand	former post office		
Martinsen	Las Animas	former post office		
Martynia	Prowers	former post office		
Marvel	La Plata	census-designated place	37.1125°N 108.1267°W	6,736 feet (2,053 m)
Marvine	Rio Blanco	former post office		
Maryvale	Grand	unincorporated community	39.9330°N 105.7872°W	8,698 feet (2,651 m)
Mason	Larimer	former post office		
Masontown	Summit	unincorporated community	39.5664°N 106.1003°W	9,334 feet (2,845 m)
Masonville	Larimer	unincorporated community	40.4875°N 105.2108°W	5,390 feet (1,643 m)
Massadona	Moffat	unincorporated community	40.2527°N 108.6404°W	5,794 feet (1,766 m)
Masters	Weld	ghost town	40.3094°N 104.2450°W	4,455 feet (1,358 m)
Matheson	Elbert	census-designated place	39.1717°N 103.9755°W	5,797 feet (1,767 m)
Mattison	Elbert	see Matheson		
Maxey	Baca	former post office		
Maxeyville	Rio Grande	unincorporated community	37.6181°N 106.1495°W	7,677 feet (2,340 m)
Maybell	Moffat	census-designated place	40.5188°N 108.0885°W	5,915 feet (1,803 m)
Mayday	La Plata	ghost town	37.3506°N 108.0767°W	8,734 feet (2,662 m)
Mayne	Huerfano	former post office		
Maysville	Chaffee	census-designated place	38.5386°N 106.1903°W	8,232 feet (2,509 m)
McClave	Bent	census-designated place	38.1375°N 102.8505°W	3,868 feet (1,179 m)
McCollin	Lincoln	former post office		
McCoy	Eagle	census-designated place	39.9161°N 106.7256°W	6,706 feet (2,044 m)
McElmo	Montezuma	former post office		
McFerran	El Paso	former post office		
McGregor	Routt	unincorporated community	40.4794°N 107.0351°W	6,503 feet (1,982 m)
McGuire	Huerfano	see Camp Shumway		
McKay Landing	Broomfield	Broomfield neighborhood	39.9533°N 105.0206°W	5,266 feet (1,605 m)
McMillan	Huerfano	former post office		
McMillan	Prowers	see Toledo		
McPhee (Note: McPhee is now submerged in McPhee Reservoir.)	Montezuma	ghost town		
Mead	Weld	statutory town	40.2333°N 104.9986°W	5,003 feet (1,525 m)
Meadow Hills	Arapahoe	Aurora neighborhood	39.6411°N 104.8172°W	5,709 feet (1,740 m)
Meadow Lake	Jefferson	Arvada neighborhood	39.8069°N 105.1422°W	5,538 feet (1,688 m)
Meadow Wood Farms	Jefferson	unincorporated community	39.8381°N 105.1797°W	5,673 feet (1,729 m)
Meadowbrook Heights	Jefferson	unincorporated community	39.5622°N 105.0883°W	5,571 feet (1,698 m)
Meadowood	Arapahoe	Aurora neighborhood	39.6589°N 104.8039°W	5,673 feet (1,729 m)
Meadows	Bent	former post office		
Mears	Chaffee	former post office		
Medano Springs	Alamosa	former post office		
Medford Springs	Bent	former post office		
Medill	Cheyenne	former post office		
Medina Plaza	Las Animas	unincorporated community	37.1278°N 104.7922°W	6,690 feet (2,039 m)
Medlin	Jefferson	former post office		
Meeker† (Note: Meeker has been the seat of Rio Blanco County, Colorado since the county was created on March 25, 1889.)	Rio Blanco	statutory town	40.0375°N 107.9131°W	6,240 feet (1,902 m)
Meeker Park	Boulder	unincorporated community	40.2339°N 105.5308°W	8,494 feet (2,589 m)
Meekton	Washington	former post office		
Meily	Chaffee	former post office		
Melrose	Jefferson	Wheat Ridge neighborhood	39.7731°N 105.0908°W	5,440 feet (1,658 m)
Melville	Elbert	former post office		
Melvin	Arapahoe	former post office		
Menger	Las Animas	former post office		
Menoken	Montrose	former post office		
Mercer	Logan	see Peetz		
Mercier	Pueblo	former post office		
Meredith	Pitkin	unincorporated community	39.3630°N 106.7300°W	7,772 feet (2,369 m)
Meridian	Douglas	census-designated place	39.5517°N 104.8589°W	5,889 feet (1,795 m)
Meridian Village	Douglas	census-designated place	39.5310°N 104.8261°W	5,909 feet (1,801 m)
Meridith	Crowley	former post office		
Merino	Logan	statutory town	40.4825°N 103.3513°W	4,042 feet (1,232 m)
Mesa (1883)	Mesa	see Fruita		
Mesa	Mesa	unincorporated community	39.1664°N 108.1390°W	5,643 feet (1,720 m)
Mesa County		county	39.0182°N 108.4677°W	
Mesa Heights	Jefferson	Arvada neighborhood	39.8392°N 105.1269°W	5,663 feet (1,726 m)
Mesa Lakes	Mesa	unincorporated community	39.0500°N 108.0923°W	9,800 feet (2,987 m)
Mesa Lakes Resort	Mesa	unincorporated community	39.0491°N 108.0915°W	9,803 feet (2,988 m)
Mesa Verde National Park	Montezuma	post office		
Mesaview	Las Animas	former post office		
Meserole	La Plata	former post office		
Mesita	Costilla	unincorporated community	37.0984°N 105.6020°W	7,674 feet (2,339 m)
Messex	Washington	unincorporated community	40.4294°N 103.4366°W	4,088 feet (1,246 m)
Meyer	Costilla	former post office		
Micanite	Fremont	former post office		
Michigan	Larimer	former post office		
Michigan House	Jefferson	former post office		
Middle Boulder	Boulder	see Nederland		
Middleton	San Juan	ghost town	37.8550°N 107.5723°W	9,793 feet (2,985 m)
Midland	Teller	census-designated place	38.8468°N 105.1579°W	9,406 feet (2,867 m)
Midtown	Pueblo	Pueblo post office		
Midway	Gunnison	ghost town	38.3439°N 107.0539°W	8,556 feet (2,608 m)
Midway	Larimer	unincorporated community	40.4303°N 105.3228°W	6,096 feet (1,858 m)
Midway	Teller	unincorporated community	38.7400°N 105.1428°W	10,433 feet (3,180 m)
Mildred	Montezuma	former post office		
Mildred	Yuma	former post office		
Mile High	Denver	former post office		
Milk Fort	Otero	historic trading post		
Mill City	Clear Creek	see Dumont		
Millard	Montezuma	former post office		
Millbrook	Custer	former post office		
Millet	Washington	see Platner		
Milliken	Weld	statutory town	40.3294°N 104.8553°W	4,751 feet (1,448 m)
Millwood	Montezuma	unincorporated community	37.4217°N 108.3337°W	7,625 feet (2,324 m)
Milner	Routt	unincorporated community	40.4847°N 107.0195°W	6,522 feet (1,988 m)
Minaret	Gunnison	former post office		
Mindeman	Otero	unincorporated community	37.7070°N 103.9166°W	4,718 feet (1,438 m)
Miner	Larimer	former post office		
Mineral County		county	37.6687°N 106.9241°W	
Mineral Hot Springs	Saguache	unincorporated community	38.1689°N 105.9258°W	7,749 feet (2,362 m)
Mineral Point	San Juan	former post office		
Minneapolis	Baca	former post office		
Minnehaha	El Paso	unincorporated community	38.8494°N 104.9594°W	8,346 feet (2,544 m)
Minturn	Eagle	home rule town	39.5864°N 106.4309°W	7,861 feet (2,396 m)
Mirage	Saguache	ghost town	38.1028°N 105.8645°W	7,657 feet (2,334 m)
Miramonte	Boulder	unincorporated community	39.9305°N 105.3728°W	7,822 feet (2,384 m)
Miraville	Larimer	see Fort Namaqua		
Mishawaka	Larimer	unincorporated community	40.6872°N 105.3658°W	5,876 feet (1,791 m)
Mission Viejo	Arapahoe	Aurora neighborhood	39.6464°N 104.8000°W	5,669 feet (1,728 m)
Missouri City	Gilpin	ghost town		
Mitchell	Eagle	unincorporated community	39.3917°N 106.3192°W	9,895 feet (3,016 m)
Mobley	Routt	former post office		
Model	Las Animas	unincorporated community	37.3722°N 104.2450°W	5,617 feet (1,712 m)
Modena's Crossing	Larimer	see Fort Namaqua		
Modoc	Boulder	former post office		
Moffat	Saguache	statutory town	37.9989°N 105.9100°W	7,566 feet (2,306 m)
Moffat County		county	40.6187°N 108.2075°W	
Mogote	Conejos	unincorporated community	37.0595°N 106.0922°W	8,074 feet (2,461 m)
Molding	Dolores	former post office		
Molina	Mesa	unincorporated community	39.1891°N 108.0604°W	5,600 feet (1,707 m)
Monarch	Chaffee	unincorporated community		
Monon	Baca	former post office		
Monson	Huerfano	unincorporated community	37.5161°N 104.7042°W	6,404 feet (1,952 m)
Montana	Denver	see Montana City		
Montana City	Denver	site of historic gold camp		
Montbello	Denver	Denver neighborhood	39.7936°N 104.8336°W	5,295 feet (1,614 m)
Montclair	Denver	Denver neighborhood	39.7356°N 104.9058°W	
Monte Vista	Rio Grande	home rule city	37.5792°N 106.1481°W	7,664 feet (2,336 m)
Monte Vista Estates	Douglas	unincorporated community	39.3653°N 104.9214°W	6,378 feet (1,944 m)
Montezuma	Summit	statutory town	39.5811°N 105.8672°W	10,312 feet (3,143 m)
Montezuma County		county	37.3383°N 108.5970°W	
Montgomery	Park	former post office		
Montgomery City	Park	see Montgomery		
Montrose† (Note: Montrose has been the seat of Montrose County, Colorado since the county was created on February 11, 1883.)	Montrose	home rule city	38.4783°N 107.8762°W	5,807 feet (1,770 m)
Montrose County		county	38.4027°N 108.2702°W	
Montville	Alamosa	former post office		
Monument	El Paso	home rule town	39.0917°N 104.8728°W	6,975 feet (2,126 m)
Monument Park	Las Animas	unincorporated community	37.2070°N 105.0464°W	8,596 feet (2,620 m)
Mooney	Huerfano	former post office		
Moonridge	Douglas	unincorporated community	39.3653°N 105.1175°W	7,484 feet (2,281 m)
Moore	Las Animas	former post office		
Moqui	Montezuma	former post office		
Moraine	Larimer	see Moraine Park		
Moraine Park	Larimer	former post office		
Morapos	Moffat	former post office		
Morgan	Conejos	unincorporated community	37.3278°N 106.0200°W	7,641 feet (2,329 m)
Morgan	Montezuma	former post office		
Morgan	Weld	former post office		
Morgan County		county	40.2626°N 103.8098°W	
Morgan Heights	Morgan	census-designated place	40.2875°N 103.8274°W	4,432 feet (1,351 m)
Morland (Note: Fremont changed its name to Morland on December 9, 1891; then changed it back to Fremont on February 4, 1892; then changed it to Cripple Creek on June 20, 1892. Cripple Creek has been the seat of Teller County, Colorado since the county was created on March 23, 1899.)	Teller	see Cripple Creek		
Morley	Chaffee	former post office		
Morley	Las Animas	ghost town		
Morris	Garfield	former post office		
Morris	Kit Carson	former post office		
Morrison	Jefferson	home rule town	39.6536°N 105.1911°W	5,764 feet (1,757 m)
Mosby	El Paso	former post office		
Mosca	Alamosa	unincorporated community	37.6483°N 105.8739°W	7,559 feet (2,304 m)
Mosco	Alamosa	former post office		
Mound	Teller	see Mound City		
Mound City	Teller	ghost town	38.7246°N 105.1769°W	9,180 feet (2,798 m)
Mount Carbon	Gunnison	former post office		
Mount Crested Butte	Gunnison	home rule town	38.9086°N 106.9695°W	9,498 feet (2,895 m)
Mount Harris	Routt	unincorporated community	40.4836°N 107.1448°W	6,440 feet (1,963 m)
Mount Lincoln	Mesa	unincorporated community	39.1061°N 108.3834°W	4,708 feet (1,435 m)
Mount Massive Lakes	Lake	unincorporated community	39.1522°N 106.3006°W	9,472 feet (2,887 m)
Mount Morrison	Jefferson	see Morrison		
Mount Pearl	Cheyenne	unincorporated community	38.9625°N 102.7894°W	4,557 feet (1,389 m)
Mount Princeton	Chaffee	see Mount Princeton Hot Springs		
Mount Princeton Hot Springs	Chaffee	former post office		
Mount Sneffels	Ouray	see Sneffels		
Mount Streeter	Moffat	former post office		
Mount Vernon Club Place	Jefferson	unincorporated community	39.7228°N 105.2939°W	7,894 feet (2,406 m)
Mount Vernon (Note: Mount Vernon was the home of Territorial Governor Robert Williamson Steele and administrative capital of the Provisional Government of the Territory of Jefferson.)	Jefferson	ghost town		
Mountain City (Note: Located at an elevation of 8,498 feet (2,590 m), the Mountain City, Kansas Territory, post office was the highest elevation U.S. post office when it opened on January 17, 1860. Excavation of gold ore necessitated moving the post office uphill to Central City on October 8, 1869.)	Gilpin	Gilpin	see Central City	
Mountain Meadow Heights	Jefferson	unincorporated community	39.6608°N 105.3092°W	7,060 feet (2,152 m)
Mountain Meadows	Boulder	census-designated place	40.0239°N 105.3805°W	7,224 feet (2,202 m)
Mountain Park	Jefferson	former post office		
Mountain View	Jefferson	home rule town	39.7744°N 105.0555°W	5,387 feet (1,642 m)
Mountain View	Larimer	unincorporated community	40.5925°N 105.1291°W	5,089 feet (1,551 m)
Mountain View Estates	Adams	unincorporated community	39.9694°N 105.0300°W	5,374 feet (1,638 m)
Mountain View Estates	Broomfield	Broomfield neighborhood		
Mountain View Estates	Jefferson	Lakewood neighborhood	39.7275°N 105.1439°W	5,751 feet (1,753 m)
Mountain Village	San Miguel	home rule town	37.9314°N 107.8565°W	9,600 feet (2,926 m)
Mountaindale	Park	former post office		
Mountainvale	Mesa	former post office		
Mountearl	Larimer	former post office		
Mud Creek	Bent	former post office		
Muddy Creek	Pueblo	see Abbey		
Muleshoe	Huerfano	unincorporated community	37.5897°N 105.1825°W	8,793 feet (2,680 m)
Mulford	Garfield	census-designated place	39.4087°N 107.1685°W	6,234 feet (1,900 m)
Mullenville	Park	former post office		
Mulvane	Prowers	former post office		
Mumper Corner	Weld	unincorporated community	40.4519°N 104.6972°W	4,695 feet (1,431 m)
Muriel	Huerfano	former post office		
Murnane	La Plata	former post office		
Murphy's Switch	Chaffee	former post office		
Murray Place	Baca	unincorporated community	37.5161°N 102.9971°W	4,672 feet (1,424 m)
Mustang	Huerfano	former post office		
Myers	El Paso	former post office		
Myrtle	Pueblo	former post office		
Mystic	Routt	ghost town	40.5700°N 106.9959°W	6,900 feet (2,103 m)

== N ==
Select the OpenStreetMap link at the right to view the location of places in this section.

Place	County	Type	Location	Elevation
Namaqua	Larimer	see Loveland		
Namaqua Station	Larimer	see Fort Namaqua		
Nantes	Weld	see Gilcrest		
Nantucket	Arapahoe	Aurora neighborhood	39.7167°N 104.8586°W	5,456 feet (1,663 m)
Naomi	Summit	former statutory town	39.7234°N 106.1278°W	
Nast	Pitkin	unincorporated community	39.2917°N 106.6014°W	8,865 feet (2,702 m)
Nathrop	Chaffee	census-designated place	38.7472°N 106.0756°W	7,687 feet (2,343 m)
Naturita	Montrose	statutory town	38.2183°N 108.5687°W	5,423 feet (1,653 m)
Navajo	Archuleta	former post office		
Navajo Springs	Montezuma	former post office		
Nederland	Boulder	statutory town	39.9614°N 105.5108°W	8,232 feet (2,509 m)
Needleton	San Juan	unincorporated community	37.6406°N 107.6915°W	8,278 feet (2,523 m)
Neeley	Custer	former post office		
Nelson	Morgan	unincorporated community	40.2528°N 103.6608°W	4,252 feet (1,296 m)
Nepesta	Pueblo	unincorporated community	38.1689°N 104.1430°W	4,416 feet (1,346 m)
Neva	Chaffee	former post office		
Nevada	Gilpin	see Nevadaville		
Nevada City	Gilpin	see Nevadaville		
Nevadaville	Gilpin	ghost town	39.7953°N 105.5325°W	9,121 feet (2,780 m)
New Castle	Garfield	home rule town	39.5728°N 107.5364°W	5,597 feet (1,706 m)
New Fort Lyon	Bent	see Fort Lyon (1867)		
New Haven	Logan	unincorporated community	40.4830°N 102.8363°W	4,262 feet (1,299 m)
New Liberty	Saguache	former post office		
New Liberty	Weld	former post office		
New Liberty	Larimer	former post office		
New Memphis	Douglas	former post office		
New Raymer (Note: The Raymer, Colorado, post office closed on May 14, 1895. On November 13, 1909, the New Raymer, Colorado, post office opened near the train station, about 640 feet (200 m) southwest of the original post office. The Town of Raymer, the State of Colorado, and the United States Census Bureau prefer the original name.)	Weld	see Raymer		
New Wattenberg	Weld	see Wattenberg		
New Windsor	Larimer	see Windsor		
Newcastle	Garfield	see New Castle		
Newcomb	Conejos	former post office		
Newett	Chaffee	unincorporated community	38.8667°N 105.9889°W	9,081 feet (2,768 m)
Newfield	El Paso	former post office		
Newmire	San Miguel	former post office		
Newton	Yuma	former post office		
Ni Wot	Boulder	see Niwot		
Niccora	San Juan	former post office		
Nichols	Rio Grande	former post office		
Niegoldstown	San Juan	former post office		
Nighthawk	Douglas	unincorporated community	39.3547°N 105.1694°W	6,312 feet (1,924 m)
Ninaview	Bent	unincorporated community	37.6439°N 103.2408°W	4,432 feet (1,351 m)
Ninemile Corner	Boulder	Erie neighborhood	40.0153°N 105.1036°W	5,262 feet (1,604 m)
Ninetyfour	Clear Creek	ghost town	39.8275°N 105.6364°W	10,538 feet (3,212 m)
Niwot	Boulder	census-designated place	40.1039°N 105.1708°W	5,095 feet (1,553 m)
No Name	Garfield	census-designated place	39.5611°N 107.2931°W	5,906 feet (1,800 m)
Noel	San Miguel	unincorporated community	38.0997°N 107.9128°W	8,796 feet (2,681 m)
Noland	Boulder	unincorporated community	40.2592°N 105.2544°W	6,027 feet (1,837 m)
Norfolk	Larimer	unincorporated community	40.9108°N 104.9697°W	5,899 feet (1,798 m)
Norfolk Glen	Adams	Aurora neighborhood	39.7436°N 104.8000°W	5,453 feet (1,662 m)
Norma	Rio Grande	former post office		
Norman	Costilla	former post office		
Normandy Estates	Jefferson	unincorporated community	39.5875°N 105.0606°W	5,495 feet (1,675 m)
Norrie	Pitkin	census-designated place	39.3281°N 106.6563°W	8,448 feet (2,575 m)
North Avondale	Pueblo	unincorporated community	38.2619°N 104.3461°W	4,518 feet (1,377 m)
North Capitol Hill	Denver	Denver neighborhood		
North Creede	Mineral	Creede neighborhood	37.8642°N 106.9259°W	8,963 feet (2,732 m)
North Delta	Delta	unincorporated community	38.7586°N 108.0692°W	4,938 feet (1,505 m)
North End	El Paso	Colorado Springs neighborhood		
North Green Valley	Jefferson	Wheat Ridge neighborhood	39.7808°N 105.1019°W	5,348 feet (1,630 m)
North La Junta	Otero	census-designated place	37.9985°N 103.5227°W	4,045 feet (1,233 m)
North Park Hill	Denver	Denver neighborhood		
North Pecos	Adams	unincorporated community		
North Pole	El Paso	former post office		
North Star	Gunnison	former post office		
North Veta	Huerfano	former post office		
North Washington	Adams	census-designated place	39.8072°N 104.9789°W	5,190 feet (1,582 m)
Northborough Heights	Adams	Federal Heights neighborhood	39.8792°N 105.0200°W	5,548 feet (1,691 m)
Northdale	Dolores	unincorporated community	37.8094°N 109.0168°W	6,663 feet (2,031 m)
Northeast Park Hill	Denver	Denver neighborhood		
Northgate	Jackson	unincorporated community	40.8858°N 106.2942°W	7,920 feet (2,414 m)
Northglenn	Adams	home rule city	39.8855°N 104.9872°W	5,371 feet (1,637 m)
Northglenn	Weld	home rule city	39.8855°N 104.9872°W	5,371 feet (1,637 m)
Northlands	Huerfano	Walsenburg neighborhood	37.6570°N 104.7957°W	6,171 feet (1,881 m)
Northmoor	Broomfield	Broomfield neighborhood	39.9397°N 105.0561°W	5,377 feet (1,639 m)
Northstar	Gunnison	former post office		
Northway	Prowers	former post office		
Northwood Acres	Jefferson	unincorporated community	39.8361°N 105.1694°W	5,604 feet (1,708 m)
Norton	Prowers	former post office		
Norwood	San Miguel	statutory town	38.1305°N 108.2923°W	7,011 feet (2,137 m)
Nowlinsville	Baca	former post office		
Nucla	Montrose	statutory town	38.2694°N 108.5479°W	5,787 feet (1,764 m)
Nugget	Gilpin	unincorporated community	39.8636°N 105.5883°W	10,262 feet (3,128 m)
Nunda	Huerfano	former post office		
Nunn	Weld	statutory town	40.7036°N 104.7808°W	5,190 feet (1,582 m)
Nutria	Archuleta	unincorporated community	37.2308°N 107.1256°W	7,123 feet (2,171 m)
Nyberg	Pueblo	unincorporated community	38.2683°N 104.3980°W	4,544 feet (1,385 m)

== O ==
Select the OpenStreetMap link at the right to view the location of places in this section.

Place	County	Type	Location	Elevation
O.Z.	El Paso	see Old Zounds		
Oak Creek	Routt	statutory town	40.2750°N 106.9584°W	7,428 feet (2,264 m)
Oak Grove	Montrose	unincorporated community	38.4600°N 107.9281°W	5,928 feet (1,807 m)
Oak Park	Jefferson	Arvada neighborhood	39.8358°N 105.1211°W	5,636 feet (1,718 m)
Oakes	Arapahoe	former post office		
Oakesdale	Arapahoe	former post office		
Oakview	Huerfano	former post office		
Oberon Acres	Jefferson	Arvada neighborhood	39.8392°N 105.1156°W	5,627 feet (1,715 m)
Oehlmann Park	Jefferson	unincorporated community	39.5189°N 105.2592°W	8,448 feet (2,575 m)
Officer	Las Animas	former post office		
Ohio	Gunnison	see Ohio City		
Ohio City	Gunnison	ghost town	38.5667°N 106.6117°W	8,570 feet (2,612 m)
Ojo	Huerfano	former post office		
Oklarado	Baca	former post office		
Olathe	Montrose	statutory town	38.6050°N 107.9823°W	5,358 feet (1,633 m)
Olava	Park	see Grant		
Old Colorado City	El Paso	see Colorado City, El Paso County		
Old Fort Bent	Otero	see Bent's Old Fort National Historic Site		
Old Fort Lyon	Bent	see Fort Lyon (1860-1867)		
Old Fort Vasquez	Weld	see Fort Vasquez		
Old Homestead	Jackson	unincorporated community	40.4403°N 106.1436°W	8,773 feet (2,674 m)
Old Julesburg	Sedgwick	see Fort Julesburg		
Old Mountain View	El Paso	ghost town	38.8339°N 104.9914°W	9,636 feet (2,937 m)
Old Roach	Larimer	ghost town	40.9244°N 106.1172°W	9,380 feet (2,859 m)
Old Snowmass	Pitkin	see Snowmass		
Old Towne	Arapahoe	Aurora neighborhood	39.7128°N 104.8511°W	5,495 feet (1,675 m)
Old Wells	Cheyenne	unincorporated community	38.9000°N 102.3263°W	4,183 feet (1,275 m)
Old Zounds	El Paso	ghost town		
Olde Town Arvada	Jefferson	Arvada neighborhood		
Oleson	Adams	former post office		
Olinger Gardens	Jefferson	Wheat Ridge neighborhood	39.7569°N 105.0569°W	5,404 feet (1,647 m)
Olio	Jefferson	former post office		
Olney	Crowley	see Olney Springs		
Olney Springs	Crowley	statutory town	38.1661°N 103.9447°W	4,383 feet (1,336 m)
Olympus Heights	Larimer	unincorporated community	40.3778°N 105.4839°W	7,487 feet (2,282 m)
Omar	Weld	former post office		
Omer	Otero	former post office		
Oneco	Moffat	former post office		
Onine	Las Animas	former post office		
Opal	Bent	former post office		
Ophir	San Miguel	home rule town	37.8569°N 107.8326°W	9,695 feet (2,955 m)
Ophir Loop	San Miguel	unincorporated community	37.8597°N 107.8684°W	9,278 feet (2,828 m)
Oranola	Kit Carson	former post office		
Orchard	Morgan	census-designated place	40.3320°N 104.1178°W	4,409 feet (1,344 m)
Orchard City	Delta	statutory town	38.8283°N 107.9709°W	5,446 feet (1,660 m)
Orchard Mesa	Mesa	census-designated place	39.0430°N 108.5523°W	4,646 feet (1,416 m)
Orchard Park	Fremont	unincorporated community	38.4722°N 105.2283°W	5,443 feet (1,659 m)
Ordway† (Note: Ordway has been the seat of Crowley County, Colorado since the county was created on May 29, 1911.)	Crowley	statutory town	38.2181°N 103.7561°W	4,311 feet (1,314 m)
Orean	Alamosa	see Montville		
Orient	Saguache	former post office		
Oriental	Saguache	former post office		
Oriska	Kit Carson	former post office		
Oro	Lake	see Oro City		
Oro City‡ (Note: On November 1, 1861, the Territory of Colorado created 17 original counties, with Oro City as the original seat of Lake County, Colorado Territory, serving until 1866.)	Lake	ghost town	39.2353°N 106.2522°W	10,709 feet (3,264 m)
Orodelfan	Boulder	former post office		
Orodell	Boulder	unincorporated community	40.0150°N 105.3253°W	5,725 feet (1,745 m)
Orr	Otero	unincorporated community	38.1075°N 103.5352°W	4,154 feet (1,266 m)
Orr	Weld	see Kersey		
Orsburn	Elbert	former post office		
Orson	Gunnison	former post office		
Orson	Mesa	former post office		
Ortiz	Conejos	unincorporated community	37.0042°N 106.0442°W	7,986 feet (2,434 m)
Osage	Pueblo	former post office		
Osage Avenue	Pueblo	see Osage		
Osborn	Boulder	former post office		
Osborn Avenue	Boulder	see Osborn		
Osgood	Weld	former post office		
Osier	Conejos	unincorporated community	37.0133°N 106.3364°W	9,619 feet (2,932 m)
Otero County		county	37.9026°N 103.7166°W	
Otis	Jackson	former post office		
Otis	Washington	statutory town	40.1489°N 102.9630°W	4,341 feet (1,323 m)
Ouray† (Note: Ouray has been the seat of Ouray County, Colorado since the county was created on January 18, 1877, although the name of the county was changed to Uncompahgre County for the three days from February 27 to March 2, 1883.)	Ouray	home rule city	38.0228°N 107.6714°W	7,792 feet (2,375 m)
Ouray County		county	38.1554°N 107.7691°W	
Overland	Denver	Denver neighborhood		
Oversteg	Gunnison	former post office		
Overton	Pueblo	former post office		
Ovid	Sedgwick	statutory town	40.9605°N 102.3880°W	3,530 feet (1,076 m)
Owen	Lincoln	former post office		
Owl	Jackson	former post office		
Owl Canyon	Larimer	unincorporated community	40.7625°N 105.1755°W	5,741 feet (1,750 m)
Oxford	La Plata	unincorporated community	37.1689°N 107.7142°W	6,601 feet (2,012 m)
Oxford	Otero	see Fowler		
Oxyoke	Jefferson	unincorporated community	39.3030°N 105.1983°W	6,339 feet (1,932 m)

== P–Z ==
- List of populated places in Colorado: P through Z

Colorado populated places: A B C D E F G H I J K L M N O P Q R S T U V W X Y Z

== See also ==
- Bibliography of Colorado
- Geography of Colorado
- History of Colorado
- Index of Colorado-related articles
- List of Colorado-related lists
  - List of adjectivals and demonyms for Colorado cities
  - List of census-designated places in Colorado
  - List of counties in Colorado
  - List of county seats in Colorado
  - List of forts in Colorado
  - List of ghost towns in Colorado
  - List of municipalities in Colorado
  - List of post offices in Colorado
- Outline of Colorado
