= Weld County School District RE-1 =

School district in Colorado, United States

Address
- 14827 Weld County Road 42 Gilcrest, Colorado, 80623; United States
- Coordinates: 40°17′25″N 104°46′35″W

District information
- Type: Unified school district
- Grades: P–12
- Superintendent: Kimberly Bloemen
- School board: 5 members
- Chair of the board: Ben Rainbolt
- Schools: 3 elementary, 2 middle, 1 high
- Budget: $33,758,000
- NCES District ID: 0804200

Students and staff
- Students: 1,768
- Teachers: 153.11 (on an FTE basis)
- Staff: 318.11 (on an FTE basis)
- Student–teacher ratio: 11.55
- District mascot: Viking
- Colors: Black, white, and gold

Other information
- Website: wcsdre1.org

Weld County School District RE-1 is a school district headquartered in Gilcrest, Colorado. In the 2023–24 academic year, the district had 1,768 students. The district also serves LaSalle and Platteville.

In 2012 the district began utilizing EAGLE-Net Alliance, a broadband internet cooperative involving several local governments in the state that is intended to increase the proliferation of broadband internet. One member of the group's board of directors, Jo Barbie, served as the WCSD RE-1 superintendent.

In the 2012–2013 school year the district began holding classes only four days per week instead of five and therefore the district spent 1.7% less of its original budget, meaning it spent $360,000 fewer dollars. Don Rangel became the superintendent in 2015.

After Rangel was fired, Johan van Nieuwenhuizen was hired in 2019.

In the 2020–2021 school year, North Valley Middle School in LaSalle, Colorado earned the US Department of Education's National Blue Ribbon School award, making this school the only Middle School in Colorado to earn this award.

== Schools ==
- Valley High School
- North Valley Middle School
- South Valley Middle School
- Gilcrest Elementary School
- Pete Mirich Elementary School
- Platteville Elementary School
