= Heritage Hills =

Heritage Hills may refer to the following places:

- Heritage Hills, Colorado in Douglas County, Colorado, United States
- Heritage Hills, New York in Westchester County, New York, United States
- Heritage Hills, Alberta in Strathcona County, Alberta, Canada
- Heritage Hills, Oklahoma City, a neighborhood of Oklahoma City, Oklahoma, United States
- Heritage Hills High School in Lincoln City, Indiana, United States

== See also ==
- Heritage Hill Historic District (disambiguation)
