= North Central Colorado Urban Area =

Metropolitan area of Colorado

Coordinates: 38.9972°N 105.5478°W

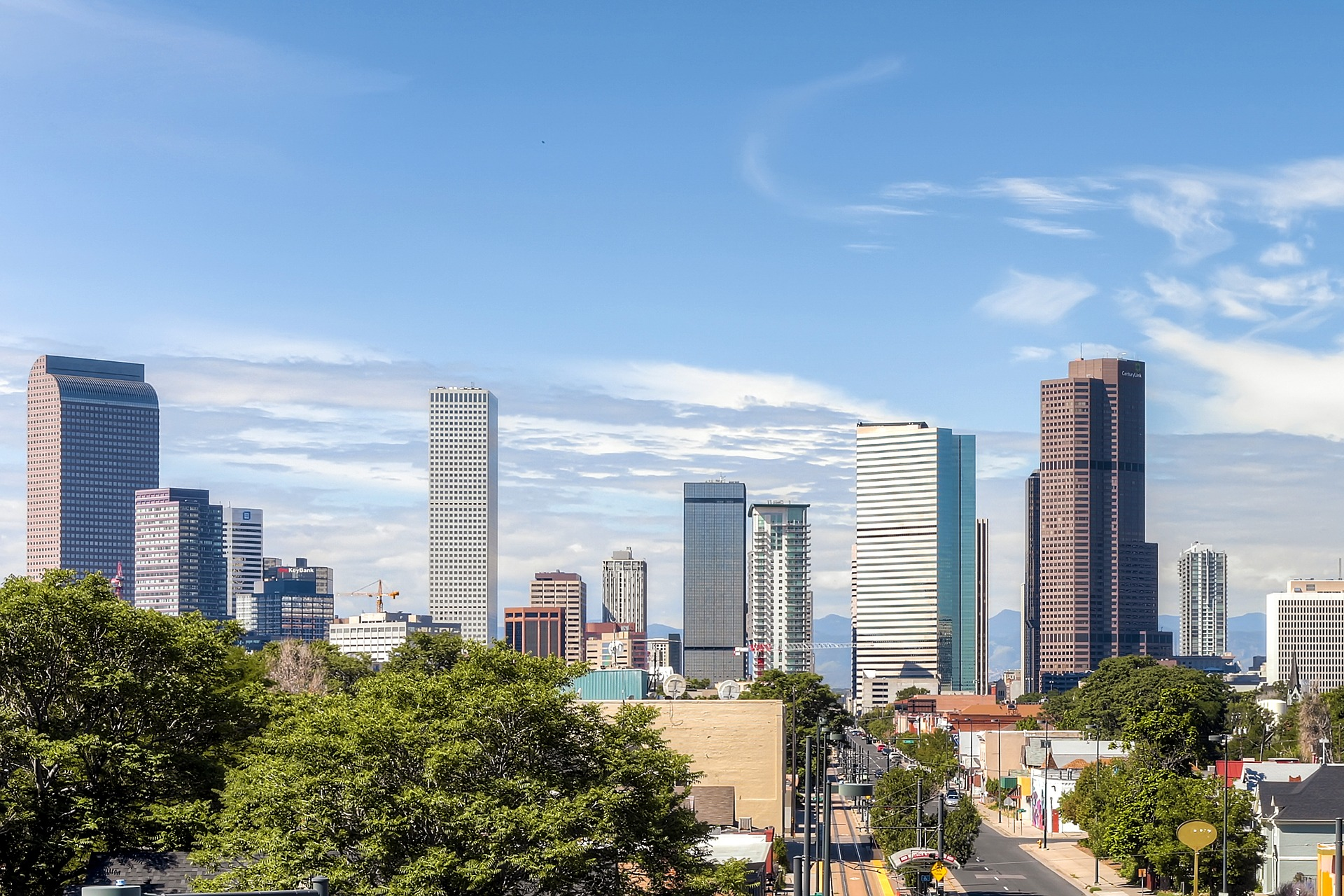
- Skyline of Downtown Denver
Interactive map of the
North Central Colorado Urban Area
City and County of Denver
Denver–Aurora–Centennial, CO MSA
Boulder, CO MSA
Greeley, CO MSA
Fort Collins, CO MSA
Other Counties in the Front Range corridor
- Country: United States
- States: Colorado
- Largest city: Denver
- Other principal cities: - Aurora; - Lakewood; - Thornton; - Arvada; - Westminster; - Centennial; - Highlands Ranch; - Castle Rock; - Broomfield; - Commerce City; - Boulder; - Greeley; - Longmont; - Fort Collins; - Loveland
- Time zone: UTC−7 (MST)
  - Summer (DST): UTC−6 (MDT)

The North Central Colorado Urban Area comprises the four contiguous metropolitan statistical areas in the north central region of the State of Colorado: the Denver–Aurora Metropolitan Statistical Area, the Boulder Metropolitan Statistical Area, the Fort Collins-Loveland Metropolitan Statistical Area, and the Greeley Metropolitan Statistical Area. With the exception of southeastern Elbert County, southeastern Park County, and tiny portions of southern Douglas County, the entire North Central Colorado Urban Area is drained by the South Platte River and its tributaries. The North Central Colorado Urban Area is the central, and the most populous, of the three primary subregions of the Front Range Urban Corridor.

The North Central Colorado Urban Area had a population of 3,390,504 at the 2010 United States census, a 17.67% increase from the 2000 United States census. In 2010, 67.42% of Coloradans lived in the North Central Colorado Urban Area.

== Extent ==
The North Central Colorado Urban Area
Core-based statistical area	2010 Census	County	2010 Census	2000 Census	Pop Change
Denver–Aurora–Broomfield, CO MSA	2,543,482	City and County of Denver, Colorado	600,158	554,636	+8.21%
Denver–Aurora–Broomfield, CO MSA	2,543,482	Arapahoe County, Colorado	572,003	487,967	+17.22%
Denver–Aurora–Broomfield, CO MSA	2,543,482	Jefferson County, Colorado	534,543	527,056	+1.42%
Denver–Aurora–Broomfield, CO MSA	2,543,482	Adams County, Colorado	441,603	363,857	+21.37%
Denver–Aurora–Broomfield, CO MSA	2,543,482	Douglas County, Colorado	285,465	175,766	+62.41%
Denver–Aurora–Broomfield, CO MSA	2,543,482	City and County of Broomfield, Colorado	55,889	0	NA
Denver–Aurora–Broomfield, CO MSA	2,543,482	Elbert County, Colorado	23,086	19,872	+16.17%
Denver–Aurora–Broomfield, CO MSA	2,543,482	Park County, Colorado	16,206	14,523	+11.59%
Denver–Aurora–Broomfield, CO MSA	2,543,482	Clear Creek County, Colorado	9,088	9,322	−2.51%
Denver–Aurora–Broomfield, CO MSA	2,543,482	Gilpin County, Colorado	5,441	4,757	+14.38%
Fort Collins-Loveland, CO MSA	299,630	Larimer County, Colorado	299,630	251,494	+19.14%
Boulder, CO MSA	294,567	Boulder County, Colorado	294,567	291,288	+1.13%
Greeley, CO MSA	252,825	Weld County, Colorado	252,825	180,936	+39.73%
Total			3,390,504	2,881,474	+17.67%

== Constituent jurisdictions ==
The North Central Colorado Urban Area comprises:

- Town of Allenspark
- Town of Alma
- City of Arvada
- Town of Ault
- City of Aurora
- Town of Bennett
- Town of Berthoud
- City of Black Hawk
- Town of Boone
- City of Boulder
- Town of Bow Mar
- City of Brighton
- City and County of Broomfield
- City of Castle Pines North
- Town of Castle Rock
- City of Centennial
- Central City
- City of Cherry Hills Village
- Town of Columbine Valley
- City of Commerce City
- City of Dacono
- Town of Deer Trail
- City and County of Denver
- Town of Eaton
- City of Edgewater
- Town of Elizabeth
- Town of Empire
- City of Englewood
- Town of Erie
- Town of Estes Park
- City of Evans
- Town of Fairplay
- City of Federal Heights
- Town of Firestone
- City of Fort Collins
- City of Fort Lupton
- Town of Foxfield
- Town of Frederick
- Town of Garden City
- Town of Georgetown
- Town of Gilcrest
- City of Glendale
- City of Golden
- City of Greeley
- City of Greenwood Village
- Town of Grover
- Town of Hudson
- City of Idaho Springs
- Town of Jamestown
- Town of Johnstown
- Town of Keenesburg
- Town of Kersey
- Town of Kiowa
- Town of La Salle
- City of Lafayette
- Town of Lakeside
- City of Lakewood
- Town of Larkspur
- City of Littleton
- Town of Lochbuie
- City of Lone Tree
- City of Longmont
- City of Louisville
- City of Loveland
- Town of Lyons
- Town of Mead
- Town of Milliken
- Town of Morrison
- Town of Mountain View
- Town of Nederland
- City of Northglenn
- Town of Nunn
- Town of Parker
- Town of Pierce
- Town of Platteville
- Town of Raymer
- Town of Severance
- City of Sheridan
- Town of Silver Plume
- Town of Simla
- Town of Superior
- City of Thornton
- Town of Timnath
- Town of Ward
- Town of Wellington
- City of Westminster
- City of Wheat Ridge
- Town of Windsor
- unincorporated Adams County
- unincorporated Arapahoe County
- unincorporated Boulder County
- unincorporated Clear Creek County
- unincorporated Douglas County
- unincorporated Elbert County
- unincorporated Gilpin County
- unincorporated Jefferson County
- unincorporated Larimer County
- unincorporated Park County
- unincorporated Weld County.

== See also ==
- Colorado
  - Outline of Colorado
    - Index of Colorado-related articles
  - Bibliography of Colorado
  - Colorado statistical areas
    - Front Range Urban Corridor
      - North Central Colorado Urban Area
      - South Central Colorado Urban Area
  - Geography of Colorado
  - History of Colorado
  - List of counties in Colorado
  - List of places in Colorado
    - List of census-designated places in Colorado
    - List of forts in Colorado
    - List of ghost towns in Colorado
    - List of mountain passes in Colorado
    - List of mountain peaks of Colorado
    - List of municipalities in Colorado
      - List of adjectivals and demonyms for Colorado cities
      - List of city nicknames in Colorado
    - List of post offices in Colorado
  - Protected areas of Colorado
