= Old Mountain View, Colorado =

Old Mountain View
- Location within Colorado
- Coordinates: 38°50′2″N 104°59′29″W
- Country: United States
- State: Colorado
- County: El Paso County, Colorado

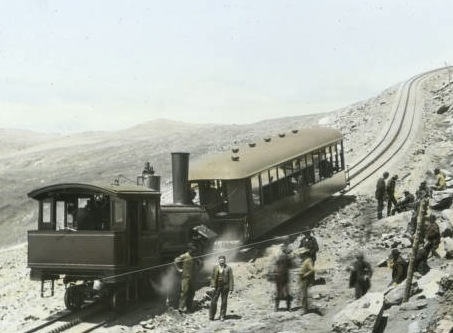
Manitou and Pike's Peak Railway train rounding Windy Point, around 1900.

Old Mountain View, also known as Mountain View, was a railway station in El Paso County, Colorado at 9,636 feet (2,937 m) in altitude. Beginning in 1891, it was a stop on the Manitou and Pike's Peak Railway between Manitou Springs and Pikes Peak. Butterworth Flat, Minnehaha, Half-Way House, Ruxton Park, Windy Point, and Saddle House, were also stops on the line to the summit.

Pike’s Peak Daily News was published at Old Mountain View with the names and addresses of the passengers who traveled the cog railway. At more than 9,600 feet (2,900 m), it was called "The Most Elevated Publication on Earth". It was published from June 1891 to 1922 or later.

== Sources ==
- Brunk, Ivan W. (1989). Pike's Peak pioneers. Colorado Springs, Colorado: Pulpit Rock Press. ISBN 978-0-9624008-0-3.
