= La Posta, Colorado =

Unincorporated community in La Plata County, CO, USA

Coordinates: 37°07′31″N 107°53′42″W

La Posta is an unincorporated community in La Plata County, in the U.S. state of Colorado.

La Posta is a name derived from Spanish meaning "travelers' rest".
