= Heritage Hill Historic District =

Heritage Hill Historic District may refer to:

- Heritage Hill Historic District (Burlington, Iowa), listed on the National Register of Historic Places in Des Moines County, Iowa
- Heritage Hill Historic District (Grand Rapids, Michigan), listed on the National Register of Historic Places in Kent County, Michigan
