= Raymer, Colorado =

Town in Colorado, United States

Town of Raymer, Colorado
- Town
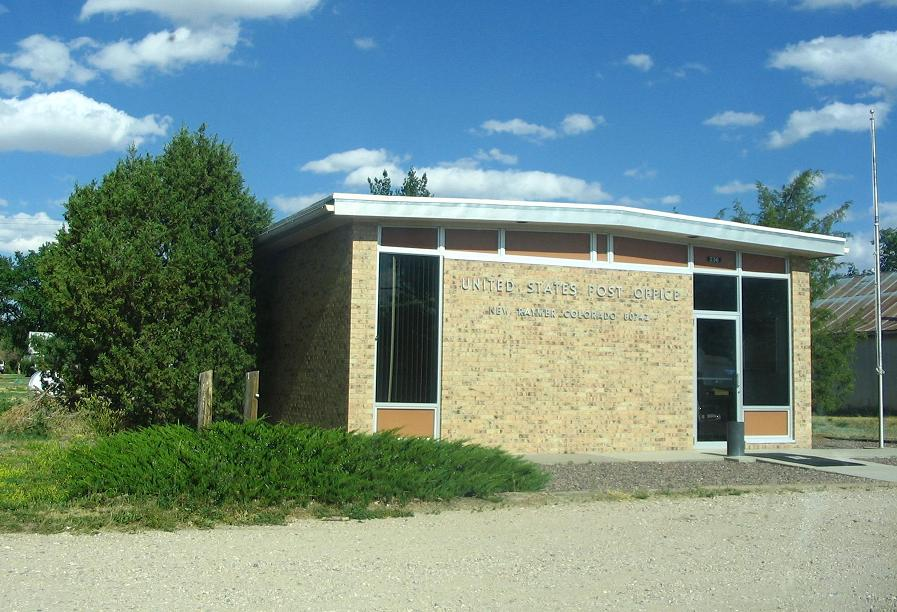
- The New Raymer Post Office in the Town of Raymer, Colorado

- Location of Raymer (New Raymer) in Weld County, Colorado.
- Coordinates: 40°36′31″N 103°50′35″W
- Country: United States
- State: Colorado
- County: Weld County
- Incorporated: 1919
- Named for: George Raymer

Government
  - Type: Statutory Town

Area
  - Total: 0.78 sq mi (2.03 km^{2})
  - Land: 0.78 sq mi (2.03 km^{2})
  - Water: 0 sq mi (0.00 km^{2})
- Elevation: 4,777 ft (1,456 m)

Population (2020)
  - Total: 110
  - Density: 140/sq mi (54/km^{2})
- Time zone: UTC-7 (MST)
  - Summer (DST): UTC-6 (MDT)
- ZIP code: New Raymer 80742
- Area code: 970
- FIPS code: 08-63045
- GNIS feature ID: 2412533

The Town of Raymer is a Statutory Town located in Weld County, Colorado, United States. The population was 110 at the U.S. Census 2020.

The community has two official names:

- Raymer - The legal name of the incorporated Town of Raymer.
- New Raymer - The official United States Postal Service designation.

Raymer hosts a Minuteman III Missile Alert Facility from Warren Air Force Base.

== History ==
The Chicago, Burlington and Quincy Railroad platted the Raymer townsite in Weld County in 1888. The town was named for George Raymer, an assistant chief engineer for the railroad. The Raymer Post Office opened on June 27, 1888. The town flourished for a while, but families eventually moved away and the Post Office closed on May 14, 1895.

The town was given a second life when it was replatted in 1909. On November 13, 1909, the United States Post Office Department open a new post office named New Raymer to distinguish it from the old Raymer post office. The town was incorporated in 1919 under its original name as the Town of Raymer.

The State of Colorado uses the name Raymer for the town, but the United States Postal Service uses the name New Raymer (ZIP code 80742) and refuses to accept the name Raymer for postal delivery. Either name may appear on maps or in gazetteers.

== Geography ==
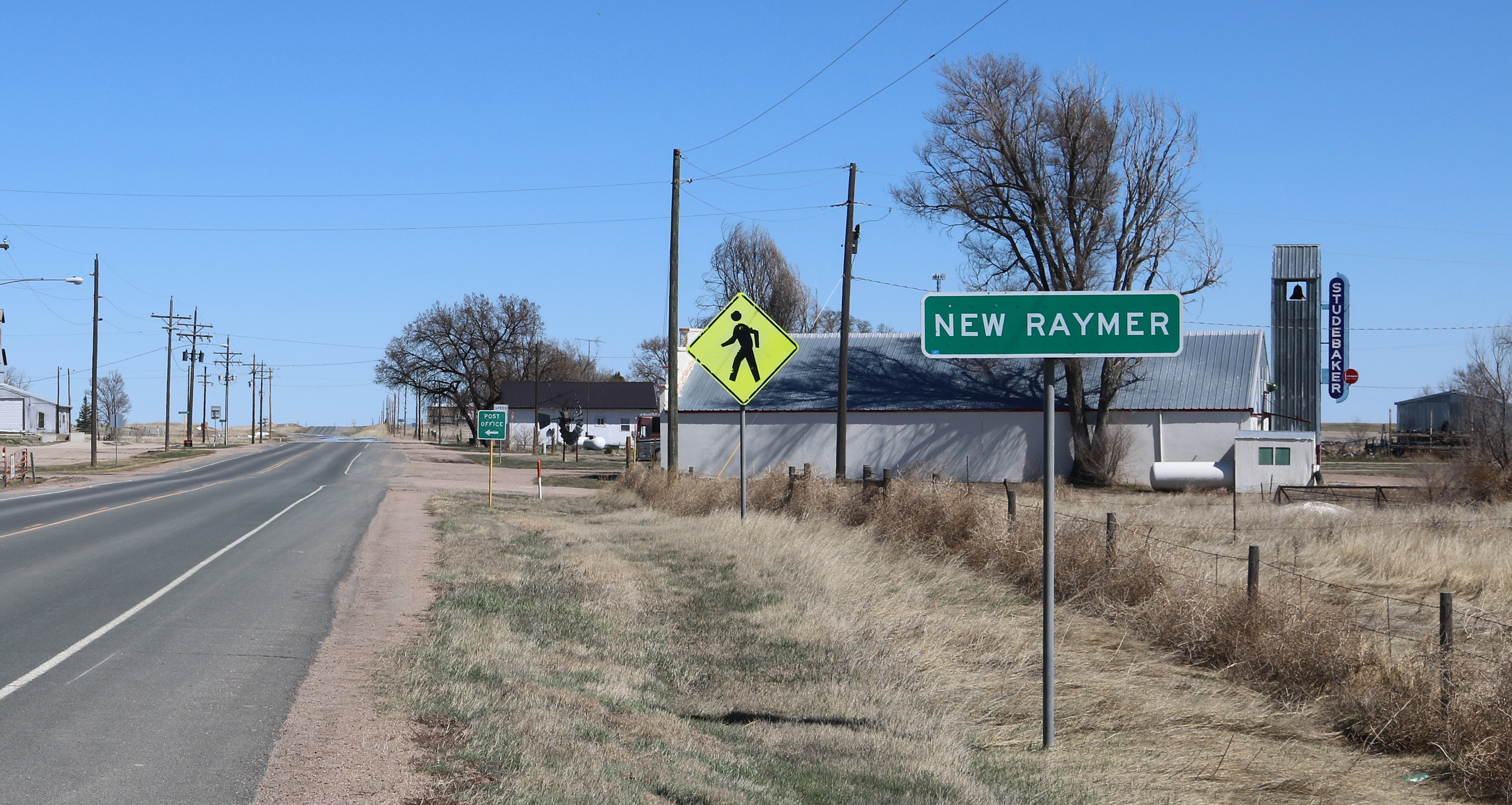
Ramer and Colorado State Highway 14

According to the United States Census Bureau, the town has a total area of 0.7 square miles (1.8 km^{2}), all of it land.

== Climate ==
According to the Köppen Climate Classification system, Raymer has a cold semi-arid climate, abbreviated "BSk" on climate maps. The hottest temperature recorded in Raymer was 104 °F (40 °C) on June 26, 2012, June 27, 2012, and July 17, 2006, while the coldest temperature recorded was −31 °F (−35 °C) on December 22, 1990.

Climate data for New Raymer, Colorado, 1991–2020 normals, extremes 1987–present
Month	Jan	Feb	Mar	Apr	May	Jun	Jul	Aug	Sep	Oct	Nov	Dec	Year
Record high °F (°C)	72 (22)	77 (25)	88 (31)	89 (32)	94 (34)	104 (40)	104 (40)	101 (38)	99 (37)	90 (32)	80 (27)	73 (23)	104 (40)
Mean maximum °F (°C)	59.8 (15.4)	63.1 (17.3)	72.0 (22.2)	78.8 (26.0)	86.8 (30.4)	93.3 (34.1)	97.9 (36.6)	95.9 (35.5)	91.2 (32.9)	81.4 (27.4)	70.2 (21.2)	60.7 (15.9)	98.6 (37.0)
Mean daily maximum °F (°C)	40.7 (4.8)	42.3 (5.7)	51.9 (11.1)	59.0 (15.0)	68.5 (20.3)	80.3 (26.8)	87.5 (30.8)	85.5 (29.7)	76.6 (24.8)	62.4 (16.9)	49.8 (9.9)	40.7 (4.8)	62.1 (16.7)
Daily mean °F (°C)	27.3 (−2.6)	28.7 (−1.8)	37.2 (2.9)	44.1 (6.7)	53.8 (12.1)	64.7 (18.2)	71.5 (21.9)	69.3 (20.7)	60.5 (15.8)	47.1 (8.4)	35.6 (2.0)	27.4 (−2.6)	47.3 (8.5)
Mean daily minimum °F (°C)	13.9 (−10.1)	15.0 (−9.4)	22.6 (−5.2)	29.2 (−1.6)	39.1 (3.9)	49.1 (9.5)	55.4 (13.0)	53.1 (11.7)	44.3 (6.8)	31.8 (−0.1)	21.5 (−5.8)	14.2 (−9.9)	32.4 (0.2)
Mean minimum °F (°C)	−8.0 (−22.2)	−6.1 (−21.2)	3.6 (−15.8)	15.6 (−9.1)	25.1 (−3.8)	37.6 (3.1)	46.2 (7.9)	43.9 (6.6)	30.6 (−0.8)	14.1 (−9.9)	1.2 (−17.1)	−6.0 (−21.1)	−15.1 (−26.2)
Record low °F (°C)	−21 (−29)	−26 (−32)	−20 (−29)	0 (−18)	14 (−10)	22 (−6)	41 (5)	36 (2)	22 (−6)	−2 (−19)	−17 (−27)	−31 (−35)	−31 (−35)
Average precipitation inches (mm)	0.27 (6.9)	0.42 (11)	0.93 (24)	1.87 (47)	2.82 (72)	2.35 (60)	2.40 (61)	2.14 (54)	1.51 (38)	1.26 (32)	0.57 (14)	0.44 (11)	16.98 (430.9)
Average snowfall inches (cm)	4.6 (12)	6.4 (16)	6.3 (16)	5.6 (14)	1.7 (4.3)	0.0 (0.0)	0.0 (0.0)	0.0 (0.0)	0.6 (1.5)	4.2 (11)	6.2 (16)	6.6 (17)	42.2 (107.8)
Average extreme snow depth inches (cm)	3.6 (9.1)	3.5 (8.9)	3.5 (8.9)	2.8 (7.1)	1.2 (3.0)	0.0 (0.0)	0.0 (0.0)	0.0 (0.0)	0.3 (0.76)	2.6 (6.6)	3.4 (8.6)	4.5 (11)	8.2 (21)
Average precipitation days (≥ 0.01 in)	3.9	5.2	6.1	9.2	11.8	10.0	9.9	9.0	7.5	6.5	4.6	3.9	87.6
Average snowy days (≥ 0.1 in)	4.0	5.0	4.1	3.5	0.7	0.0	0.0	0.0	0.3	1.9	3.7	4.2	27.4
Source 1: NOAA
Source 2: National Weather Service

== Demographics ==
Historical population
Census	Pop.	Note	%±
1920	267		—
1930	254		−4.9%
1940	169		−33.5%
1950	130		−23.1%
1960	91		−30.0%
1970	68		−25.3%
1980	80		17.6%
1990	98		22.5%
2000	91		−7.1%
2010	96		5.5%
2020	110		14.6%

== See also ==
- Front Range Urban Corridor
- North Central Colorado Urban Area
- Denver-Aurora-Boulder, CO Combined Statistical Area
- Greeley, CO Metropolitan Statistical Area
