= Kelim, Colorado =

Unincorporated community in Larimer County, CO, USA

Coordinates: 40°24′24″N 104°57′03″W

Kelim is an unincorporated community in Larimer County, in the U.S. state of Colorado.

== History ==
A post office called Kelim was established in 1915, and remained in operation until 1925. The community was named after Lee J. Kelim, an early settler.
