= North Avondale, Colorado =

Unincorporated community in Pueblo County, CO, USA

- Unincorporated community
- Location in Pueblo County and the state of Colorado North Avondale, Colorado (the United States)
- Coordinates: 38°15′43″N 104°20′46″W
- Country: United States
- State: Colorado
- County: Pueblo
- Time zone: UTC-7 (MST)
  - Summer (DST): UTC-6 (MDT)
- ZIP code: 81022 (Avondale)
- Area code: 719
- GNIS feature ID: 193754

North Avondale is an unincorporated community in Pueblo County, Colorado, United States. The U.S. Post Office at Avondale (ZIP Code 81022) now serves North Avondale postal addresses.
