= Nepesta, Colorado =

Unincorporated community in Pueblo County, CO, USA

Coordinates: 38°10′08″N 104°08′35″W

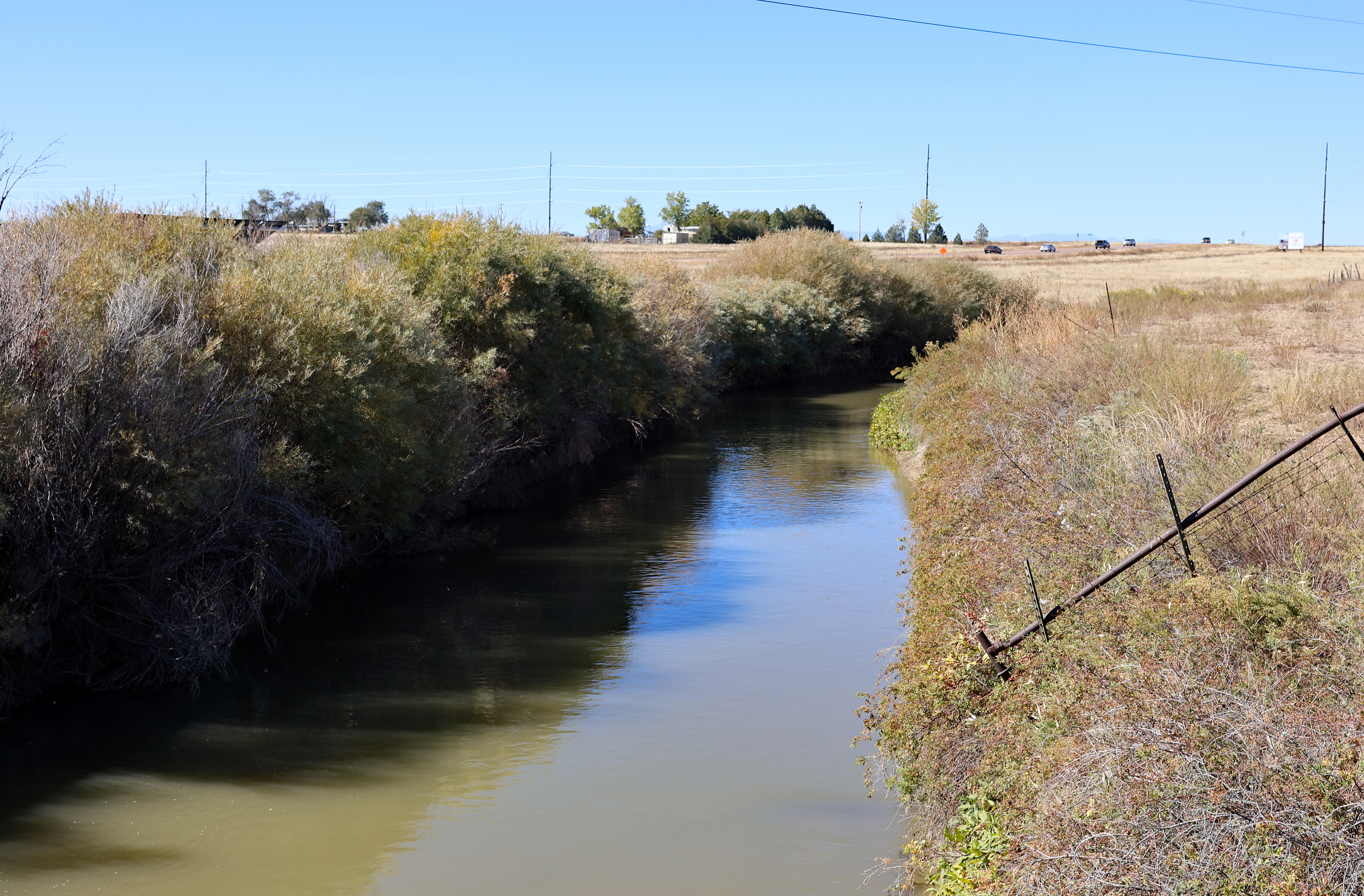
The Rocky Ford Highline Canal at Nepesta. Highway 50 is in the background.

Nepesta is an unincorporated community in Pueblo County, in the U.S. state of Colorado.

== History ==
A post office called Nepesta was established in 1876, and remained in operation until 1929. "Rio Nepesta" is a variant name of the nearby Arkansas River.
