= Heritage Hills, Colorado =

- neighborhood
- Location of Heritage Hills in Douglas County, Colorado.
- Coordinates: 39°32′36″N 104°52′44″W
- Country: United States
- State: Colorado
- County: Douglas County
- City: City of Lone Tree
- Elevation: 5,915 ft (1,803 m)

Population (2000)
  - Total: 658
- Time zone: UTC-7 (MST)
  - Summer (DST): UTC-6 (MDT)
- ZIP code: Lone Tree 80124
- Area codes: 303 & 720
- GNIS feature: Heritage Hills, Colorado

Heritage Hills is a gated residential community in Lone Tree, Colorado, located near I-25 and Lincoln Avenue. The neighborhood features custom and semi-custom homes, many of which are estate-style with spacious lots and modern designs. Homes in Heritage Hills have a median listing price of approximately $1.67 million. The community offers private parks, walking trails, and a quiet, scenic environment while providing convenient access to nearby shopping, dining, and the broader Denver metropolitan area.

== Geography ==
Heritage Hills is located at coordinates 39.543°N 104.879°W.

== See also ==
- Outline of Colorado
  - Index of Colorado-related articles
- State of Colorado
  - Colorado cities and towns
    - Colorado census designated places
  - Colorado counties
    - Douglas County, Colorado
  - List of statistical areas in Colorado
    - Front Range Urban Corridor
    - North Central Colorado Urban Area
    - Denver-Aurora-Boulder, CO Combined Statistical Area
    - Denver-Aurora-Broomfield, CO Metropolitan Statistical Area
