= LaSalle, Colorado =

Town in Colorado, United States

Town of LaSalle, Colorado
- Statutory Town
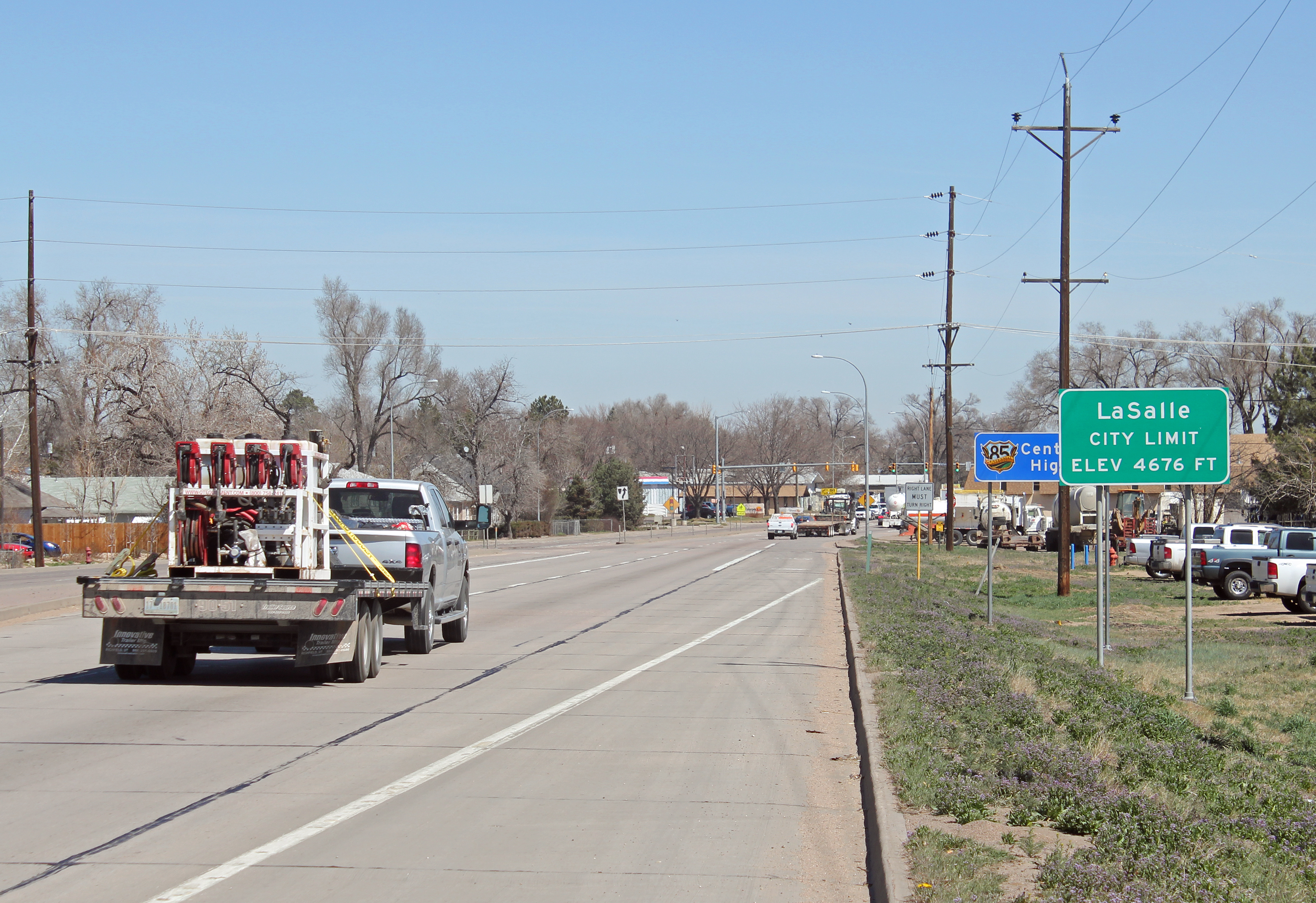
- Entering LaSalle from the south on U.S. Route 85.

- Location of the Town of LaSalle in Weld County, Colorado
- Coordinates: 40°20′55″N 104°42′22″W
- Country: United States
- State: Colorado
- County: Weld
- Incorporated (town): 1910

Government
  - Type: Statutory Town

Area
  - Total: 0.96 sq mi (2.48 km^{2})
  - Land: 0.96 sq mi (2.48 km^{2})
  - Water: 0 sq mi (0.00 km^{2})
- Elevation: 4,679 ft (1,426 m)

Population (2020)
  - Total: 2,359
  - Density: 2,460/sq mi (951/km^{2})
- Time zone: UTC-7 (Mountain (MST))
  - Summer (DST): UTC-6 (MDT)
- ZIP code: 80645
- Area code: 970
- FIPS code: 08-43605
- GNIS feature ID: 2412856
- Website: Town of LaSalle

The Town of LaSalle (incorporated in 1910 as the Town of La Salle) is a Statutory Town in Weld County, Colorado, United States. The town population was 2,359 at the 2020 United States census.

A post office called La Salle has been in operation since 1886. The community was named by railroad officials after LaSalle Street in Chicago.

== Geography ==
According to the United States Census Bureau, the town has a total area of 0.7 square miles (1.8 km^{2}), all of it land.

== Demographics ==
Historical population
Census	Pop.	Note	%±
1920	460		—
1930	564		22.6%
1940	755		33.9%
1950	797		5.6%
1960	1,070		34.3%
1970	1,227		14.7%
1980	1,929		57.2%
1990	1,783		−7.6%
2000	1,849		3.7%
2010	1,955		5.7%
2020	2,359		20.7%

== See also ==
- North Central Colorado Urban Area
- Greeley, CO Metropolitan Statistical Area
