= Minnehaha, Colorado =

Unincorporated community in El Paso County, CO, USA

- Location within Colorado Location within the United States
- Coordinates: 38°50′58″N 104°57′34″W
- Country: United States
- State: Colorado
- County: El Paso
- Elevation: 8,347 ft (2,544 m)
- GNIS feature ID: 193440

Minnehaha is an unincorporated community in El Paso County, Colorado, and a siding of the Pikes Peak Cog Railway. It is named for a character in The Song of Hiawatha.

== History ==
It was once a community of rustic summer homes, and the home of the Pikes Peak Alpine Laboratory, a botanical research station founded by Frederic and Edith Clements.
