= Gilcrest, Colorado =

Town in Colorado, United States

- Statutory Town
- Town of Gilcrest
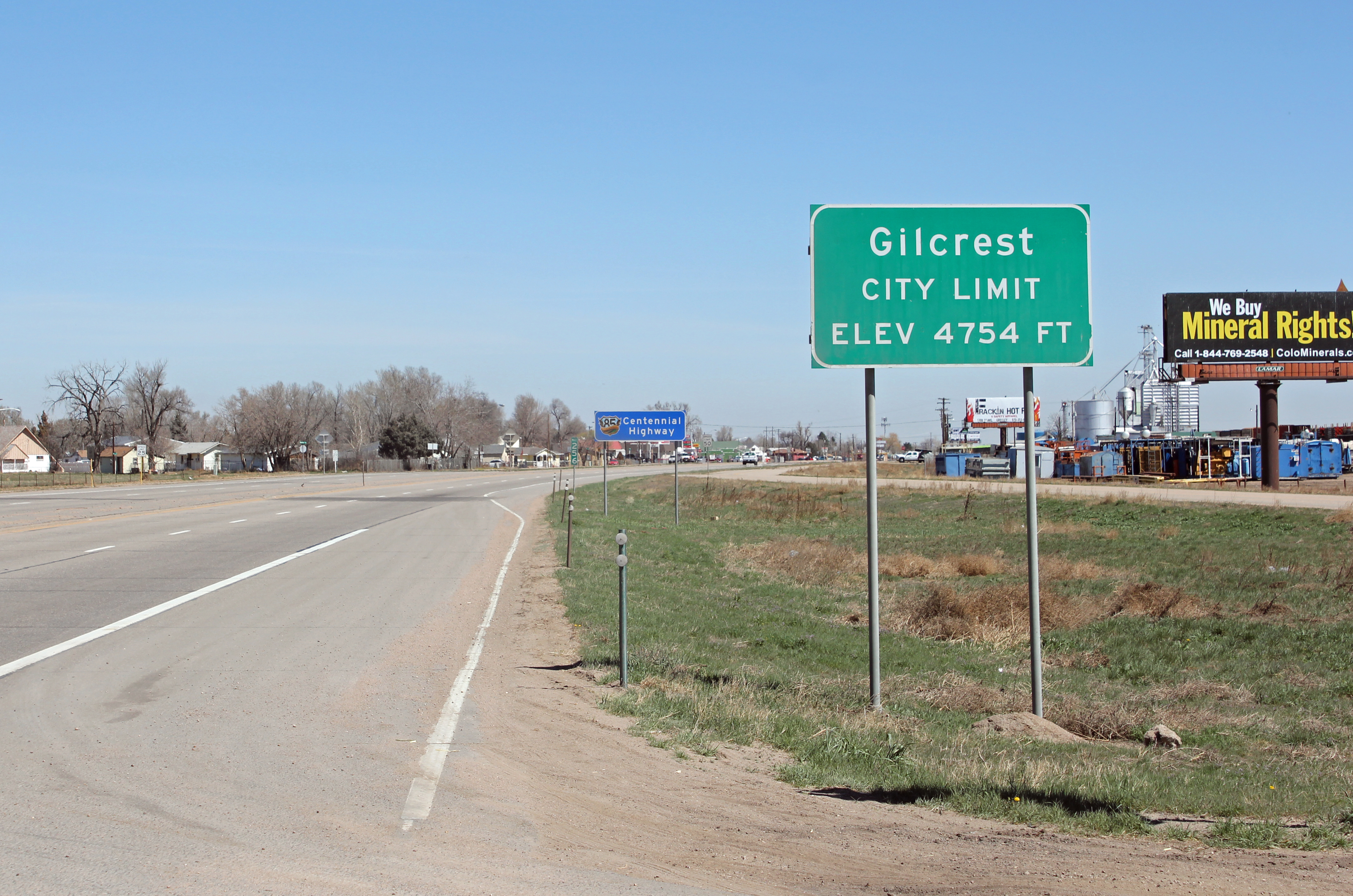
- Entering Gilcrest from the south on U.S. Route 85.

- Location of the Town of Gilcrest in Weld County, Colorado
- Coordinates: 40°17′03″N 104°46′55″W
- Country: United States
- State: Colorado
- County: Weld County
- Incorporated (town): March 18, 1912

Government
  - Type: Statutory Town

Area
  - Total: 0.811 sq mi (2.100 km^{2})
  - Land: 0.811 sq mi (2.100 km^{2})
  - Water: 0 sq mi (0.000 km^{2})
- Elevation: 4,751 ft (1,448 m)

Population (2020)
  - Total: 1,029
  - Density: 1,269/sq mi (490/km^{2})
- Time zone: UTC−07:00 (MST)
  - Summer (DST): UTC−06:00 (MDT)
- ZIP code: 80623 (Post office)
- Area code: 970
- FIPS code: 08-29955
- GNIS feature ID: 2412683
- Website: townofgilcrest.org

The Town of Gilcrest is a Statutory town located in Weld County, Colorado, United States. The town population was 1,029 at the 2020 United States census. Gilcrest is a part of the Greeley, CO Metropolitan Statistical Area and the Front Range Urban Corridor.

== History ==
A post office called Gilcrest has been in operation since 1907. The community has the name of W. K. Gilcrest, a businessperson in the banking industry.

== Geography ==
At the 2020 United States census, the town had a total area of 519 acres (2.100 km^{2}), all of it land.

== Demographics ==
Historical population
Census	Pop.	Note	%±
1920	222		—
1930	324		45.9%
1940	352		8.6%
1950	429		21.9%
1960	357		−16.8%
1970	382		7.0%
1980	1,025		168.3%
1990	1,084		5.8%
2000	1,162		7.2%
2010	1,034		−11.0%
2020	1,029		−0.5%
U.S. Decennial Census

=== 2020 census ===
As of the 2020 census, Gilcrest had a population of 1,029. The median age was 35.7 years. 26.5% of residents were under the age of 18 and 12.3% of residents were 65 years of age or older. For every 100 females there were 107.9 males, and for every 100 females age 18 and over there were 107.1 males age 18 and over.

0.0% of residents lived in urban areas, while 100.0% lived in rural areas.

There were 327 households in Gilcrest, of which 41.3% had children under the age of 18 living in them. Of all households, 57.2% were married-couple households, 14.4% were households with a male householder and no spouse or partner present, and 20.8% were households with a female householder and no spouse or partner present. About 13.8% of all households were made up of individuals and 4.6% had someone living alone who was 65 years of age or older.

There were 348 housing units, of which 6.0% were vacant. The homeowner vacancy rate was 0.8% and the rental vacancy rate was 13.0%.

Racial composition as of the 2020 census
Race	Number	Percent
White	632	61.4%
Black or African American	3	0.3%
American Indian and Alaska Native	10	1.0%
Asian	5	0.5%
Native Hawaiian and Other Pacific Islander	0	0.0%
Some other race	244	23.7%
Two or more races	135	13.1%
Hispanic or Latino (of any race)	539	52.4%

=== 2000 census ===
As of the census of 2000, there were 1,162 people, 329 households, and 271 families residing in the town. The population density was 1,559.9 inhabitants per square mile (602.3/km^{2}). There were 346 housing units at an average density of 464.5 per square mile (179.3/km^{2}). The racial makeup of the town was 62.74% White, 0.34% African American, 1.72% Native American, 0.09% Asian, 32.19% from other races, and 2.93% from two or more races. Hispanic or Latino of any race were 54.91% of the population.

There were 329 households, out of which 52.0% had children under the age of 18 living with them, 68.7% were married couples living together, 9.4% had a female householder with no husband present, and 17.6% were non-families. 14.9% of all households were made up of individuals, and 6.7% had someone living alone who was 65 years of age or older. The average household size was 3.53 and the average family size was 3.86.

In the town, the population was spread out, with 36.1% under the age of 18, 10.2% from 18 to 24, 31.2% from 25 to 44, 17.0% from 45 to 64, and 5.6% who were 65 years of age or older. The median age was 28 years. For every 100 females, there were 109.4 males. For every 100 females age 18 and over, there were 105.5 males.

The median income for a household in the town was $45,625, and the median income for a family was $45,750. Males had a median income of $28,750 versus $21,726 for females. The per capita income for the town was $12,863. About 9.3% of families and 15.5% of the population were below the poverty line, including 20.6% of those under age 18 and 8.9% of those age 65 or over.

== See also ==
- Greeley, CO Metropolitan Statistical Area
- Denver-Aurora-Greeley, CO Combined Statistical Area
- Front Range Urban Corridor
