= Highland Park Historic District =

Highland Park Historic District may refer to:

in the United States

(by state)

- Highland Park Historic District (Denver, Colorado), listed on the NRHP in West Denver, Colorado
- Highland Park (Denver, Colorado), a park that is a historic district listed on the National Register of Historic Places in West Denver, Colorado
- Highland Park Neighborhood Historic District, Lafayette, Indiana, listed on the National Register of Historic Places in Tippecanoe County, Indiana
- Highland Park Historic Business District at Euclid and Sixth Avenues, Des Moines, Iowa, listed on the National Register of Historic Places in Polk County, Iowa
- Highland Park Ford Plant, Highland Park, Michigan
- Highland Park (Meridian, Mississippi), a park that is a historic district listed on the National Register of Historic Places in Mississippi
- Highland Park Historic District (Saranac Lake, New York), listed on the NRHP in Essex County, New York
- Highland Park Residential Historic District, Pittsburgh, Pennsylvania, listed on the National Register of Historic Places in Pittsburgh, Pennsylvania
- Highland Park Shopping Village, Highpark, Texas, a National Historic Landmark
- Highland Park Historic District (Salt Lake City, Utah), listed on the NRHP in Salt Lake City, Utah
- Highland Park Plaza Historic District, Richmond, Virginia, listed on the National Register of Historic Places in Richmond, Virginia
- Highland Park Historic District (Wheeling, West Virginia), listed on the NRHP in Ohio County, West Virginia

== See also ==
- Highland Park (disambiguation)
- Highland Historic District (disambiguation)
