= National Register of Historic Places listings in west Denver =

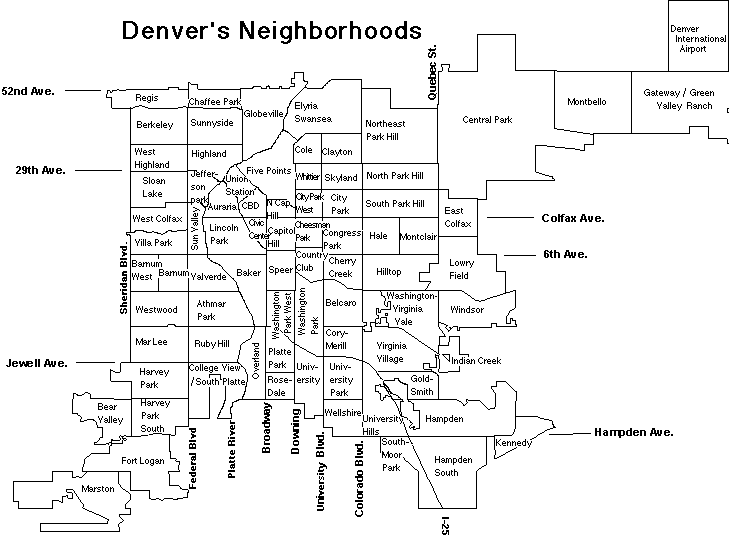
The 78 official neighborhoods of the City and County of Denver.

This is a list of the National Register of Historic Places listings in West Denver, Colorado.

This is intended to be a complete list of the properties and districts on the National Register of Historic Places in western Denver, Colorado, United States. West Denver is defined as being all of the city west of the South Platte River. The locations of National Register properties and districts may be seen in an online map.

There are 324 properties and districts listed on the National Register in Denver. West Denver includes 50 of these properties and districts, including 2 that extend into other regions; the city's remaining properties and districts are listed elsewhere. Another property was once listed but has been removed.

This National Park Service list is complete through NPS recent listings posted October 23, 2026.

== Current listings ==
	Name on the Register	Image	Date listed	Location	Neighborhood	Description
1	19th Street Bridge	19th Street Bridge	February 4, 1985 (#85000201)	19th St. 39°45′36″N 105°00′12″W	Highland	Extends into Union Station in Downtown Denver
2	All Saints Episcopal Church	All Saints Episcopal Church	June 23, 1978 (#78000839)	2222 W. 32nd Ave. 39°45′43″N 105°00′49″W	Highland	
3	Avoca Lodge	Avoca Lodge	January 26, 1990 (#89002373)	2690 S. Wadsworth Boulevard; 39°40′05″N 105°04′50″W	Bear Valley	
4	Berkeley Lake Park	Berkeley Lake Park	September 17, 1986 (#86002255)	Roughly bounded by the northern side of Berkeley Lake, Tennyson St., W. 46th Ave., and Sheridan Boulevard; 39°46′56″N 105°02′52″W	Berkeley	
5	Berkeley School	Berkeley School	November 1, 1996 (#96001237)	5025-5055 Lowell Boulevard; 39°47′19″N 105°02′04″W	Regis	
6	William Norman Bowman House-Yamecila	William Norman Bowman House-Yamecila	March 14, 1991 (#91000295)	325 King St. 39°43′20″N 105°02′03″W	Barnum	Mansion built in 1910, now the Savio House operated by the Denver Lions Club
7	Bryant-Webster Elementary School	Bryant-Webster Elementary School	December 7, 1995 (#95001421)	3635 Quivas St. 39°46′03″N 105°00′28″W	Highland	
8	Building at 1389 Stuart Street	Building at 1389 Stuart Street	July 19, 1982 (#82002287)	1389 Stuart St. 39°44′18″N 105°02′35″W	West Colfax	Queen Anne-style house built in 1890.
9	Building at 1390 Stuart Street	Building at 1390 Stuart Street	July 19, 1982 (#82002288)	1390 Stuart St. 39°44′17″N 105°02′32″W	West Colfax	
10	Building at 1435 Stuart Street	Building at 1435 Stuart Street	July 19, 1982 (#82002289)	1435 Stuart St. 39°44′22″N 105°02′33″W	West Colfax	
11	Building at 1444 Stuart Street	Building at 1444 Stuart Street	July 19, 1982 (#82002290)	1444 Stuart St. 39°44′23″N 105°02′32″W	West Colfax	
12	Building at 1471 Stuart Street	Building at 1471 Stuart Street	July 19, 1982 (#82002291)	1471 Stuart St. 39°44′23″N 105°02′33″W	West Colfax	
13	CB&Q Denver Shops Powerhouse	CB&Q Denver Shops Powerhouse	March 15, 2021 (#100006230)	5151 Bannock St. 39°47′21″N 104°59′33″W		
14	Denver Indian Center		December 29, 2025 (#100012460)	4407 Morrison Road; 39°42′09″N 105°02′43″W		
15	Denver Tramway Powerhouse	Denver Tramway Powerhouse	September 8, 2001 (#01000940)	1416 Platte St. 39°45′18″N 105°00′32″W	Highland	
16	Dickinson Branch Library	Dickinson Branch Library	March 28, 2002 (#02000262)	1545 Hooker St. 39°44′29″N 105°01′41″W	West Colfax	
17	William J. Dunwoody House	William J. Dunwoody House	April 11, 1979 (#79000582)	2637 W. 26th Ave. 39°45′18″N 105°01′11″W	Jefferson Park	
18	Elitch Theatre	Elitch Theatre	March 21, 1978 (#78000844)	W. 38th Ave. and Tennyson St. 39°46′06″N 105°02′46″W	West Highland	
19	Fort Logan National Cemetery	Fort Logan National Cemetery	November 29, 2016 (#16000810)	3698 S. Sheridan Blvd. 39°38′53″N 105°02′52″W		
20	Fourth Church of Christ, Scientist	Fourth Church of Christ, Scientist	April 21, 2004 (#04000336)	3101 W. 31st Ave. 39°45′40″N 105°01′37″W	West Highland	
21	Hanigan-Canino Terrace	Hanigan-Canino Terrace	November 25, 1987 (#87001289)	1421-1435 W. 35th Ave. 39°45′57″N 105°00′12″W	Highland	
22	Highland Park	Highland Park	September 17, 1986 (#86002248)	Roughly bounded by Highland Park Pl., Federal Boulevard, and Fairview Pl. 39°45′47″N 105°01′34″W	West Highland	
23	Highland Park Historic District	Highland Park Historic District	January 18, 1985 (#85000082)	Bounded by Zuni St., Dunkeld Pl., Clay St., and 32nd Ave. 39°45′39″N 105°01′02″W	Highland	
24	Highlands Masonic Lodge	Highlands Masonic Lodge	November 22, 1995 (#95001337)	3220 Federal Boulevard; 39°45′45″N 105°01′27″W	Highland	
25	Inspiration Point	Inspiration Point	September 17, 1986 (#86002259)	Roughly bounded by W. 50th Ave., Sheridan Boulevard, W. 49th Ave., and Fenton St. 39°47′11″N 105°03′22″W	Regis	
26	John and Nettie Kirtley House	John and Nettie Kirtley House	March 18, 2024 (#100010080)	4524 Vrain Street; 39°46′44″N 105°02′46″W	Berkeley	
27	Loretto Heights Academy	Loretto Heights Academy	September 18, 1975 (#75000510)	3001 S. Federal Boulevard; 39°39′42″N 105°01′38″W	Harvey Park South	
28	Machebeuf Hall		November 30, 2023 (#100009576)	3040 South Loretto Way; 39°39′41″N 105°01′45″W		
29	Frederick W. Neef House	Frederick W. Neef House	October 25, 1979 (#79000588)	2143 Grove St. 39°44′59″N 105°01′35″W	Sloan Lake	
30	Niblock-Yacovetta Terrace	Niblock-Yacovetta Terrace	June 27, 1986 (#86001450)	1301-1319 W. 35th Ave. 39°45′57″N 105°00′12″W	Highland	
31	Old Highland Business District	Old Highland Business District	July 17, 1979 (#79000589)	15th and Boulder Sts. 39°45′29″N 105°00′38″W	Highland	
32	Oriental Theater	Oriental Theater	September 26, 1997 (#97001167)	4329-39 W. 44th Ave. 39°46′37″N 105°02′35″W	Berkeley	
33	Our Lady of Mount Carmel Church	Our Lady of Mount Carmel Church	April 3, 2017 (#100000820)	3517-3549 Navajo St. 39°45′59″N 105°00′15″W		
34	Overland Cotton Mill	Overland Cotton Mill	April 3, 2001 (#01000288)	1314 W. Evans Ave. 39°40′36″N 105°00′13″W	College View and South Platte	
35	Potter Highlands Historic District	Potter Highlands Historic District	January 22, 1986 (#86000097)	Roughly bounded by W. 38th Ave., Zuni St., W. 32nd Ave., and Federal Boulevard; 39°45′53″N 105°01′09″W	Highland	
36	Preston House	Preston House	December 29, 2025 (#100012459)	3715 West 32 Ave. 39°45′44″N 105°02′10″W	West Highland	
37	Rocky Mountain Hotel	Rocky Mountain Hotel	April 21, 1983 (#83001314)	2301 7th St. 39°45′08″N 105°00′53″W	Jefferson Park	Surviving portion of historic Zang Brewery complex.
38	Rocky Mountain Lake Park	Rocky Mountain Lake Park	September 17, 1986 (#86002250)	Roughly bounded by Interstate 70, Federal Boulevard, W. 46th Ave., and Lowell Boulevard; 39°46′55″N 105°01′47″W	Berkeley	
39	Romeo Block	Romeo Block	January 4, 1996 (#95001485)	2944 Zuni St. 39°45′33″N 105°00′54″W	Highland	
40	Amos H. Root Building	Amos H. Root Building	March 27, 1980 (#80000894)	1501-1529 Platte St. 39°45′24″N 105°00′32″W	Highland	
41	St. Dominic's Church	St. Dominic's Church	November 1, 1996 (#96001236)	3005 W. 29th Ave. 39°45′32″N 105°01′31″W	West Highland	
42	St. Elizabeth's Retreat Chapel	St. Elizabeth's Retreat Chapel	May 24, 1976 (#76000556)	2825 W. 32nd Ave. 39°45′46″N 105°01′19″W	Highland	
43	St. Joseph's Polish Roman Catholic Church	St. Joseph's Polish Roman Catholic Church	April 21, 1983 (#83001315)	517 E. 46th Ave. 39°46′49″N 104°58′54″W	Globeville	
44	St. Patrick Mission Church	St. Patrick Mission Church	November 14, 1979 (#79000593)	3325 Pecos St. 39°45′49″N 105°00′23″W	Highland	
45	George Schmidt House	George Schmidt House	October 29, 1976 (#76000554)	2345 7th St. 39°45′10″N 105°00′52″W	Jefferson Park	
46	South Platte River Bridges	South Platte River Bridges	October 15, 2002 (#02001128)	Interstate 25 at milepost 210.53; 39°44′36″N 105°00′56″W	Jefferson Park and Sun Valley	Extends into Auraria in Northeast Denver
47	Stonemen's Row Historic District	Stonemen's Row Historic District	January 5, 1984 (#84000824)	Southern side of 28th Ave. between Umatilla and Vallejo Sts. 39°45′26″N 105°00′43″W	Highland	
48	Tallmadge and Boyer Block	Tallmadge and Boyer Block	October 21, 1982 (#82001013)	2926-2942 Zuni St. 39°45′32″N 105°00′54″W	Highland	
49	Tilden School for Teaching Health	Tilden School for Teaching Health	September 7, 1995 (#95001068)	Junction of W. Fairview Pl. and Grove St. 39°45′51″N 105°01′41″W	West Highland	
50	West Forty-sixth Avenue Parkway	West Forty-sixth Avenue Parkway	September 17, 1986 (#86002249)	W. 46th Ave. Parkway from Stuart St. to Grove St. 39°46′49″N 105°01′33″W	Berkeley	

== Former listing ==
	Name on the Register	Image	Date listed	Date removed	Location	Description
1	Wheeler House	Wheeler House	March 1, 2000 (#00000105)	January 14, 2010	1917 W. 32nd Ave. 39°45′44″N 105°00′34″W	Demolished in 2005.

== See also ==
- List of National Register of Historic Places in Colorado
- List of National Register of Historic Places in Denver
- List of National Register of Historic Places in downtown Denver
- List of National Register of Historic Places in northeast Denver
- List of National Register of Historic Places in southeast Denver
- List of National Historic Landmarks in Colorado
- Bibliography of Colorado
- Geography of Colorado
- History of Colorado
- Index of Colorado-related articles
- List of Colorado-related lists
- Outline of Colorado
