= Highland Park =

Highland Park may refer to:

== Places ==
=== Australia ===
- Highland Park, Queensland, a suburb of Gold Coast City

=== Canada ===
- Highland Park, Ottawa, Ontario
- Highland Park, Calgary, Alberta

=== Hong Kong ===
- Highland Park (Hong Kong), a housing estate in Kwai Chung, Hong Kong

=== New Zealand ===
- Highland Park, New Zealand, a suburb of Auckland

=== United States ===
==== Cities and towns ====
- Highland Park, Cochise County, Arizona
- Highland Park, Yavapai County, Arizona
- Highland Park, Florida
- Highland Park, Illinois, city near Chicago
- Highland Park, Michigan, city surrounded by Detroit
- Highland Park, New Jersey, borough adjacent to Edison
- Highland Park, Pennsylvania, in Mifflin County
- Highland Park, Texas, an enclave town surrounded by Dallas
- Highland Park, Wisconsin, an unincorporated community

==== Parks and neighborhoods ====
- Highland Park, Alabama, a neighborhood in Birmingham, south of downtown
- Highland Park, Los Angeles, California
- Highland Park, Oakland, California
- Highland Park (Denver), Colorado, listed on the NRHP in west Denver
- Highland Park, subdivision now part of Virginia–Highland and Poncey–Highland neighborhoods of Atlanta, Georgia
- New Highland Park, a park in Atlanta, Georgia
- Highland Park, Louisville, Kentucky (once an independent city)
- Highland Park (Boston), Massachusetts, a neighborhood and historic district also known as Fort Hill
- Highland Park, Holyoke, Massachusetts, a neighborhood northeast of downtown Holyoke, Massachusetts
- Highland Park, Saint Paul, Minnesota
- Highland Park (Meridian, Mississippi), a National Historic Landmark
- Highland Park (Brooklyn), New York
- Captain Tilly Park, formerly Highland Park, Queens, New York
- Highland Park (Rochester, New York)
- Highland Park (Pittsburgh neighborhood) a neighborhood of Pittsburgh, Pennsylvania
- Highland Park (Pittsburgh park), a park in Pittsburgh, Pennsylvania
- Highland Park, Salt Lake City, Utah
- Highland Park (Richmond), Virginia, a neighborhood in Richmond's Northside
- Highland Park Historic District (disambiguation)

== Facilities and structures ==
- "Highland Park", the nickname for Hilltop Park, a defunct baseball venue in New York City
- Highland Park distillery, a Scotch whisky distillery in Orkney
- Highland Park High School (disambiguation), several high schools in the United States
- Highland Park Junior High School, in Halifax, Nova Scotia

== Other uses ==
- Highland Park, a 2013 film
- Highland Park parade shooting, a mass shooting that occurred during a 4 July parade

== See also ==
- Highland (disambiguation)
