= Chaffee Park, Denver =

Neighborhood in Denver, Colorado, United States

Chaffee Park, Denver, Colorado
- Neighborhood in Denver
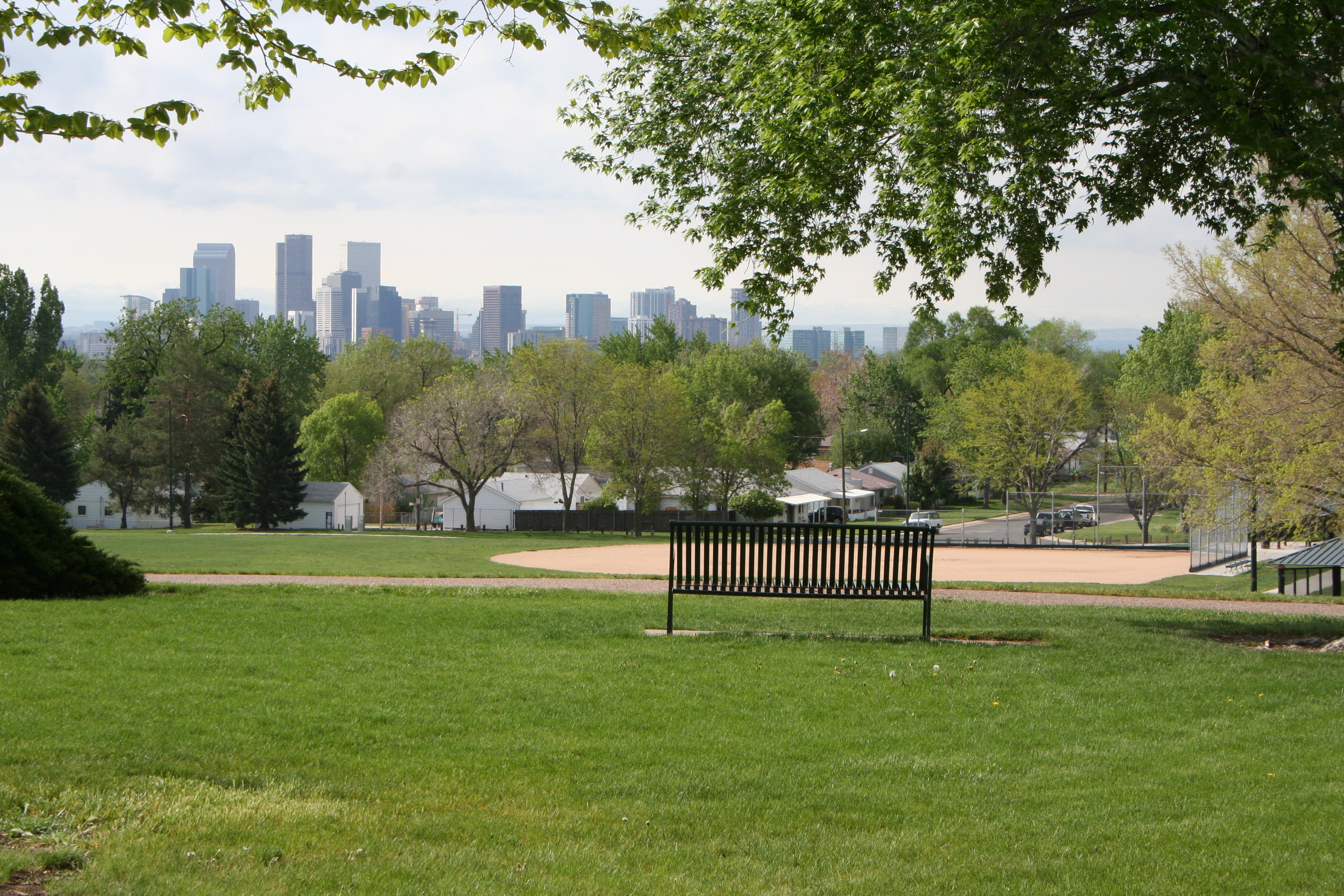
- A view towards downtown Denver from 51st and Zuni Park (Zuni Park) in the Chaffee Park Neighborhood

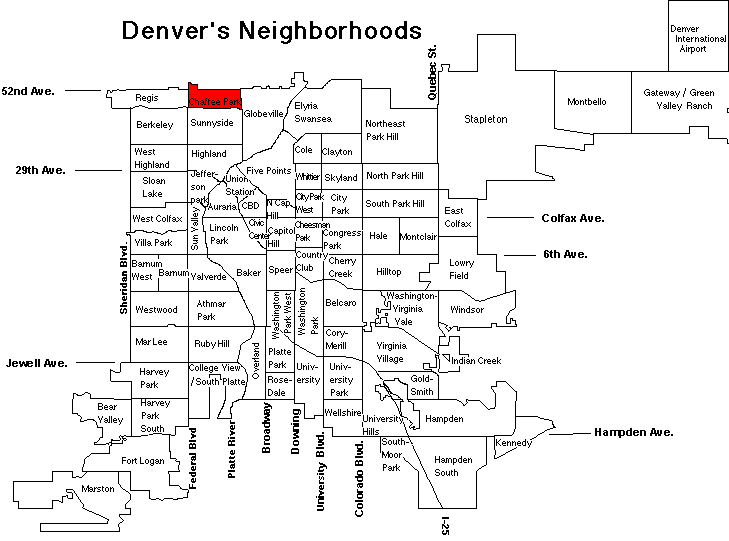
- Location in the City of Denver

- Location of Denver in the state of Colorado
- Coordinates: 39.7874°N 105.0158°W
- Country: United States
- State: Colorado
- County: Denver
- Elevation: 5,319 ft (1,621 m)
- Website: chaffeepark.org

Chaffee Park is a neighborhood in Denver, Colorado, located in the northwest corner of the city. Chaffee Park is north of Sunnyside connected via Zuni Street, and northeast of Berkeley connected through Regis via nearby Lowell Boulevard. Chaffee Park is east of Regis and south of Adams County.

Chaffee Park earned Sustainable Neighborhood designation from the City and County of Denver in February 2014. Residents are represented by the Chaffee Park Neighborhood Association, which is a Registered Neighborhood Organization (RNO) with the city.

There is another Denver city park named Chaffee Park that is located in Sunnyside (south of the Chaffee Park neighborhood). The main park in Chaffee Park is called 51st and Zuni Park, although commonly referred to as Zuni Park.

== Geography ==
=== Boundaries ===
The neighborhood's boundaries are:

- North: 52nd Avenue (including Aria Denver up to Columbine Road)
- South: Interstate 70
- East: Railroad tracks along Kalamath Street
- West: Federal Boulevard

=== Zoning ===
The majority of the neighborhood is zoned as single unit residential properties with allowance for accessory dwelling units (ADUs) (also known as carriage houses, granny flats, or English basements). The average price per square foot in August 2018 was $340 with an average asking price (for new listings) of $439,633. At the heart of the neighborhood is Zuni Park, which is a zoned open space park. There are several smaller zoned commercial corridors on the western and southeastern edges of the neighborhood, one near the neighborhood center at 49th Avenue and Zuni Street, and a commercial/residential mixed use area in the northwest corner of the neighborhood. There is a zoned area of industrial mixed use and industrial commercial properties on the eastern edge of the neighborhood spanning Osage Street to Kalamath Street.

In November 2020, the Denver City Council unanimously approved rezoning the Chaffee Park neighborhood to allow ADUs. The Chaffee Park Neighborhood Association worked with Councilwoman Amanda Sandoval to bring to the full council the measure, which will allow residential property owners to have a smaller home on a lot that is zoned for a single family home. The measure is consistent with the City Council's Blueprint Denver land use and transportation policy document, easing zoning to provide more housing. In Chaffee Park, ADUs are intended to bring down the cost of each unit of housing by increasing the number of housing units on a fixed number of lots. In practice this commonly means providing transitional housing for aging parents and adult children starting their careers.

=== Transportation ===
Chaffee Park has access to major roads and highways that connect the Denver metropolitan area, including: Federal Boulevard, Pecos Street and I-70. The neighborhood has nearby access to I-25 via I-70, I-76 via Federal Boulevard and Pecos Street, and US-36 via Federal Boulevard and Pecos Street.

Denver's Regional Transportation District (RTD) has three local bus routes serving the Chaffee Park neighborhood:

- Route 19: North Pecos
- Route 31: Federal Blvd
- Route 52: W 52nd Avenue/South Bannock

Denver's D-3 Regional Bike Route spans the neighborhood along Zuni Street, from 52nd Avenue south to the adjacent Sunnyside neighborhood, connecting to D-5 at 46th Avenue.

A 3.5 mile "Wellness Loop" pedestrian/bike path connects Chaffee Park with Regis neighborhood to its west, featuring several points of interest, including: Clear Creek Trail, Rocky Mountain Park, and the Sister Gardens at Aria. The Wellness Loop was sponsored by Cultivate Health, The Colorado Health Foundation, WalkDenver and the City of Denver.

== History ==
In the early 20th century, the area now known as Chaffee Park was a semi-rural area of truck farms interspersed with houses. Chaffee Park was then named after Jerome B. Chaffee, one of the founders of the City of Denver and Republican U.S. Senator from November 1876 to March 1879.

In April 1946, the Denver City Council approved the development plan for the Chaffee Park Heights Subdivision submitted by developer Garrett-Bromfield & Co. with initial boundaries between 48th and 52nd Avenues and between Tejon Street and Pecos Street. Chaffee Park was platted over the course of 1945–52, but was mostly completed by 1949. There was so much demand for building supplies in the United States during this period that contractors bartered with other companies around the country for materials during construction. Given the demand for post-war housing, the first 412 homes in the community were only available to U.S. military veterans with children. Numerous residents of the newly developed Chaffee Park neighborhood were second-generation Italian-Americans who were served by the nearby Guardian Angels Catholic Church of Denver that was established in 1953.

The homes were built in the Minimal Traditional-style, loosely based on the Tudor Revival-style of the 1920s and 1930s. These one-story homes are typically boxy in appearance with a simple façade, and often feature front facing gable section or gabled cover entries and a low- or intermediate-pitch roof. Overall, this type of development was common in Denver in the Post-War Period. The five-county Denver region experienced a 146% population increase between 1940 and 1965, from 407,962 residents to over one million.

== Demographics ==
According to the Piton Foundation, in 2007, the population of the neighborhood was 4,401, and there were 1,554 housing units. In the year 2000, the racial breakdown was 31.44% White, 0.91% African American, 64.13% Hispanic or Latino, 0.91% Native American, and 0.94% Asian.

== Landmarks ==
=== Zuni Park ===
Zuni Park is located at the northern edge of Chaffee Park Neighborhood between Zuni Street and Vallejo Street, south of West 52nd Avenue. Zuni Park features: a bike/pedestrian path, multiple picnic areas, a drinking fountain, restrooms, shelter, a basketball court, a playground, mixed-use field space, a baseball/softball field, and an outdoor fitness equipment area (one of The Trust for Public Land's Fitness Zone® program areas). The Fitness Zone was developed as a part of a partnership between nearby Regis University and The Trust for Public Land, who installed the equipment in March 2016 in coordination with Denver Parks and Recreation.

Zuni Park is technically unnamed and referred to as 51st & Zuni Park by the Denver Parks and Recreation Department, however it is colloquially known as Zuni Park.

=== Beach Court Elementary ===
Beach Court Elementary originally opened in 1921 at West 46th Avenue and Alcott Street utilizing three temporary structures, a fourth was added in 1927 however all four temporary buildings were taken down and replaced with a permanent building in 1929. In its first iteration, the school featured three bungalows and one kindergarten room serving approximately 100 students. Rapid enrollment at the school led to the design and construction of a new building at West 46th Avenue and Beach Court in 1929–30, designed by architect G. Meredith Musick, with six classrooms and one kindergarten.

The neighborhood experienced continued growth and Musick oversaw an addition to the school in 1949–51, dedicated on May 21, 1951. At the time of the addition, approximately 600 students attended Beach Court Elementary. In 1951 the school grew to seven classrooms and two kindergarten rooms. Additional facilities were added, including the: library, gymnasium, kitchen, clinic, conference room, office, and teacher's lounge. Educational programming expanded to include audio-visual aids, health programs, film and movie equipment, a band, and orchestra lessons. The school also functioned as a community center, used by organizations like the Boy Scouts, Girl Scouts, and the Red Cross, for sewing, first aid, nutrition, and other classes.

The school grew to twenty-two classrooms in 1993, with an addition designed by architecture firm JH/P Architecture and built by Ward Construction. The school also moved to a student-centered environment with the State of Colorado's student performance standards.

In October 2016, Beach Court Elementary was among the first Denver Public Schools (DPS) to receive a SmartLab, after a competitive application process. This addition to the schools' educational offerings was made possible by a donation from DPS alumni Marco Campus, with the remaining half of matching funds coming from DPS and the DPS Foundation. SmartLabs offer project-based, student-centered curriculum supporting STEM and other core academic content. SmartLabs are a part of DPS CareerConnect's STEMConnect partnership with DPS Curriculum and Instruction with the aim of getting students interested in STEM careers at an early age.

Beach Court Elementary's school colors are blue and white and their mascot is the eagle.

=== Chaffee Park Shopping Center ===
The Chaffee Park Shopping Center, located near West 48th Avenue and Pecos Street, opened in 1947–1949. The development was led by real estate firm Garrett-Bromfield & Co. and originally featured middle-class retail outlets such as a Safeway grocery store and a J.C. Penney department store. Developers were confident that residential real estate construction for veterans returning from World War II would fill in the housing blocks adjacent to the complex, which happened shortly thereafter.

=== Zuni Plaza ===
Zuni Plaza is an upcoming development in the heart of Chaffee Park (49th Avenue and Zuni Street) at a vacant church originally built in 1952. The project is converting the building and parking area into a commercial space for retail, restaurants, and a dedicated artist studio within the former church building. While Chaffee Park grew after the city's streetcar system connecting north Denver was dismantled, Zuni Plaza will serve as an extension of the revitalized former streetcar commercial nodes spanning north Denver along Zuni Street (which connects the Chaffee Park, Sunnyside, Highland, and Jefferson Park neighborhoods). The Zuni Plaza project is led by Denver-based developers Columbia Group and Paul Tamburello (founder of Little Man Ice Cream in LoHi and dubbed the "father of the rejuvenated Highland" by The Denver Post.)

== Skyline Festival ==
Chaffee Park's annual Skyline Festival in Zuni Park is a community event featuring: exercise, games, food trucks, pot luck food share, children's activities, booths from local community organizations and vendors, and live music. Founded in 2017 by residents of the community, the Skyline Festival is one of many events associated with the city of Denver's Denver Days program.

== See also ==
- Bibliography of Colorado
- Geography of Colorado
- History of Colorado
- Index of Colorado-related articles
- List of Colorado-related lists
  - List of neighborhoods in Denver
  - List of populated places in Colorado
- Outline of Colorado
