= Regis, Denver =

Coordinates: 39.7874°N 105.0439°W

Regis is a neighborhood in Denver. Located in North Denver, its boundaries are Harlan Street to the west, Clear Creek (Colorado) to the northwest, 52nd Avenue and the northern border of the Regis University campus to the north, Federal Boulevard to the east, and highway I-70 to the south. The Berkeley neighborhood is adjacent to its south end and the Chaffee Park neighborhood is adjacent to its east end. Located in the neighborhood is Regis University and the Willis Case golf course.

== Geography ==
The neighborhood is located in the extreme northwest part of Denver. The neighborhood includes a well established residential area with commercial centers located along the major traffic route of Federal Blvd. to the east.

== See also ==
- Bibliography of Colorado
- Geography of Colorado
- History of Colorado
- Index of Colorado-related articles
- List of Colorado-related lists
  - List of neighborhoods in Denver
  - List of populated places in Colorado
- Outline of Colorado
