= Highland, Denver =

Neighborhood in Denver, Colorado, United States

Coordinates: 39°45′45.50″N 105°0′42.88″W

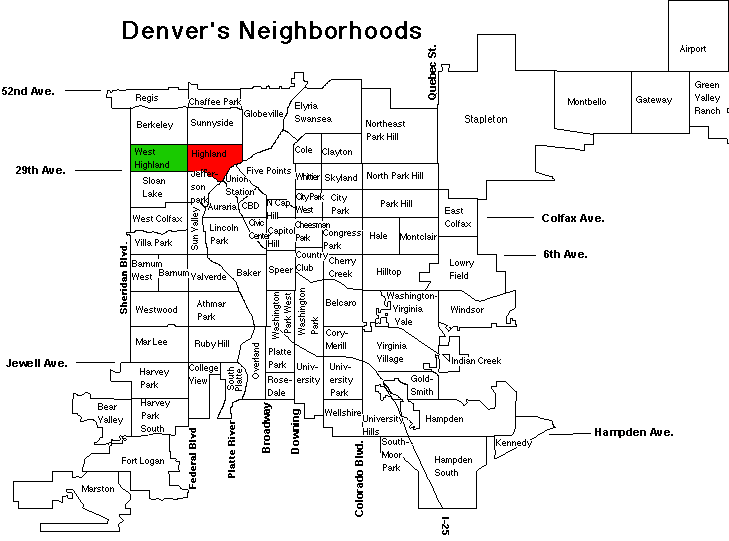
"Highlands" sometimes refers to two distinct but adjacent Denver neighborhoods that are highlighted in this map of Denver's official neighborhoods.

Highland is a distinct city-center neighborhood in Denver, Colorado, United States, bounded by West 38th Avenue to the north, a Union Pacific Railroad line on the east, the South Platte River to the southeast, Speer Boulevard on the south, and Federal Boulevard on the west. The Highlands is sometimes used to refer to two separate city-center neighborhoods in Denver; Highland and West Highland, although the two neighborhoods are distinct. Highland and West Highland are both in the area that is referred to as the Northside. Highland is located immediately northwest of downtown. Note that the Highland neighborhood association has a slightly different definition with the easternmost boundary stopping at I-25. And the West Highland neighborhood to the immediate west of Highland, with the borders of 38th and 29th Avenues on the north and south and Federal and Sheridan Boulevards on the east and west. To distinguish between its immediately adjacent neighbor, West Highland, Highland is sometimes referred to as East Highland, Lower Highland or LoHi. The two together are casually called "the Highlands," a term which often falsely encompasses other Northwest Denver neighborhoods such as Jefferson Park, Sunnyside and Berkeley. Realtors have particularly pushed the inclusion of Berkeley, located directly north of West Highland, as part of the Highlands, sometimes going so far as to refer to Berkeley and parts of Sunnyside as the "Upper Highlands". To add further confusion, within the Highlands neighborhoods there are several historic designations of various degrees, including Potter Highlands, Scottish Highlands and Highlands Park.

West Highland and the Highland neighborhoods (large portions of zip codes 80211 and 80212) currently have a population of about 57,000 people.

== History ==
The townsite of Highland was originally claimed in December 1858 by William Larimer, Jr., who the previous month had founded Denver City, but he did not follow up on this. In 1859 the Highland town company formed, and a Platte River bridge was planned to connect to Auraria and Denver. Henry Allen, a surveyor, helped establish the Highland town company. The Rocky Mountain News noted:

"No more handsome location for residences can be found than on the highlands of Highland, on the opposite side of the river from and overlooking Auraria and Denver, and a vast extent of surrounding territory."

In 1875, Owen LeFevre and other developers petitioned the Arapahoe County Commissioners to establish a village government. After annexing Potter Highland and Highland Park, they formed the Town of Highlands which became a city in 1885.

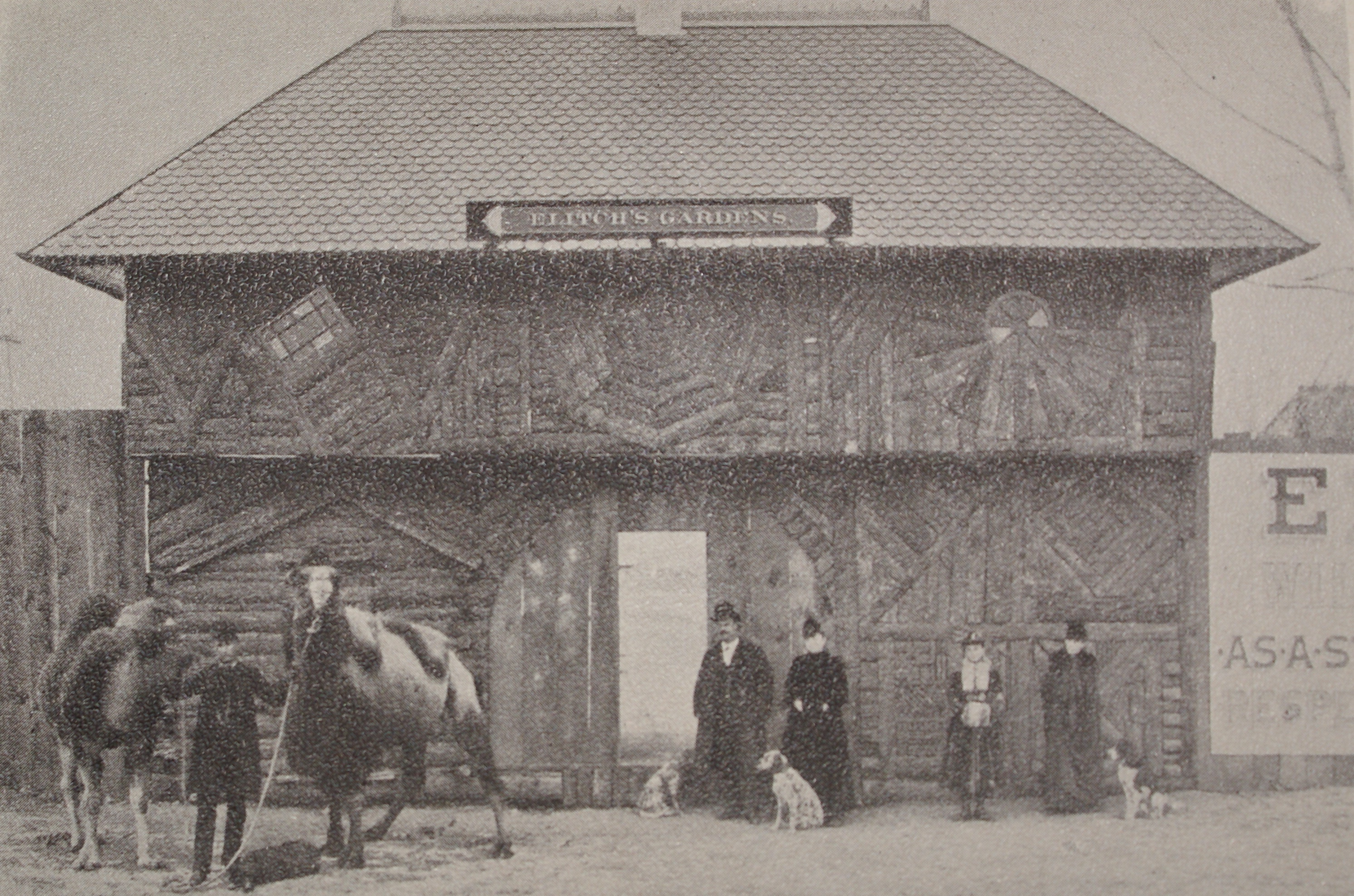
Elitch Zoological Gardens Gate, 1890. Corner of W 38th Ave and Tennyson.

1887, John and Mary Elitch purchased the 16-acre Chilcott Farm (at what would later be 38th Ave and Tennyson.) The farm was lush with vegetables, fruit and shade trees and they used the produce for their Elitch's Palace Dining Room in downtown Denver. Mrs. Elitch was quoted as saying, "The Highlands was something of a wilderness, for few streets were in common use. Mr. Elitch and I would drive from the gates of our ranch diagonally across the plains and down the hill, across the Platte River into Denver. A visit to 'the city' was a day's event to us." On May 1, 1890, the Elitches opened their Zoological Gardens and Grand Pavilion Theatre, which would later be known as Elitch Gardens. While the amusement park would later be relocated to downtown Denver, the Elitch Theatre remains at the original site today and is one of Denver's oldest historic buildings.

The residents also counted on Owen LeFevre's artesian well for clean drinking water and the breezes from the west provided clean air by blowing away any smog. Residents supported bond issues for schools, a library, and other civic improvements because they expected to have those services. The founding fathers eventually found it difficult to maintain such city services. In 1896, after considerable discussion, the residents voted to allow Denver to annex the town.

== Highland today ==
The racial breakdown for the West Highland neighborhood is 75.78% white, 19.17% Hispanic or Latino, 1.1% African American, 1.7% Asian, and 0.64% Native American. The Highland neighborhood's racial makeup is 57.42% white, 37.25% Hispanic or Latino, 1.91% African American, 1.36% Asian, and 0.64% Native American.

Crime in the Highland neighborhoods is on par with the Denver city crime rate, with a rate of 66 incidents per 1,000 people. Property crimes such as burglary, larceny theft, vehicle theft, and robbery are slightly above city and national averages, while violent crimes are slightly below.

The average price per square foot of a home in Highland in May 2023 was $518 psf.

== Gallery ==
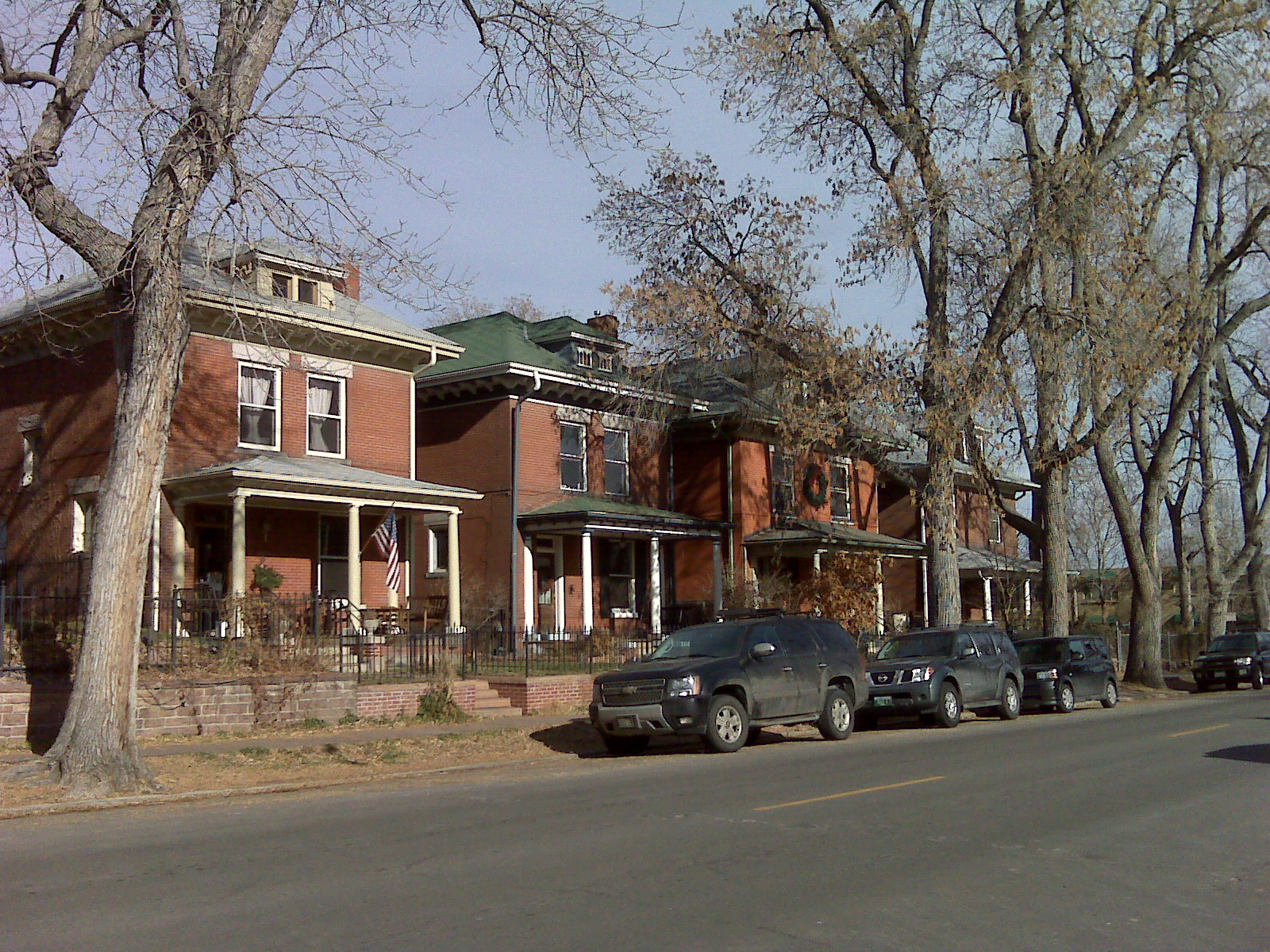
Houses in Lower Highland

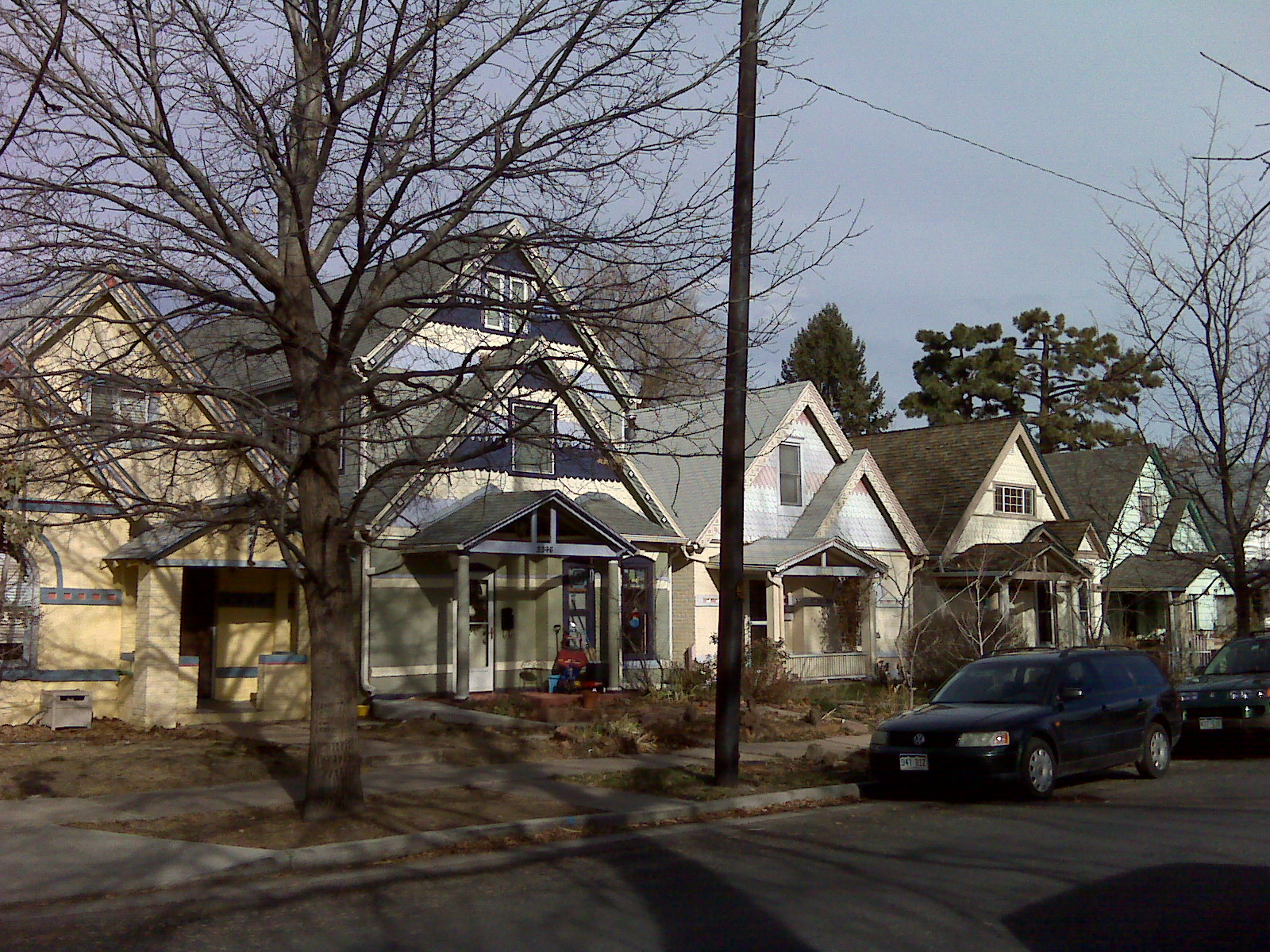
Typical side street, Denver Highland

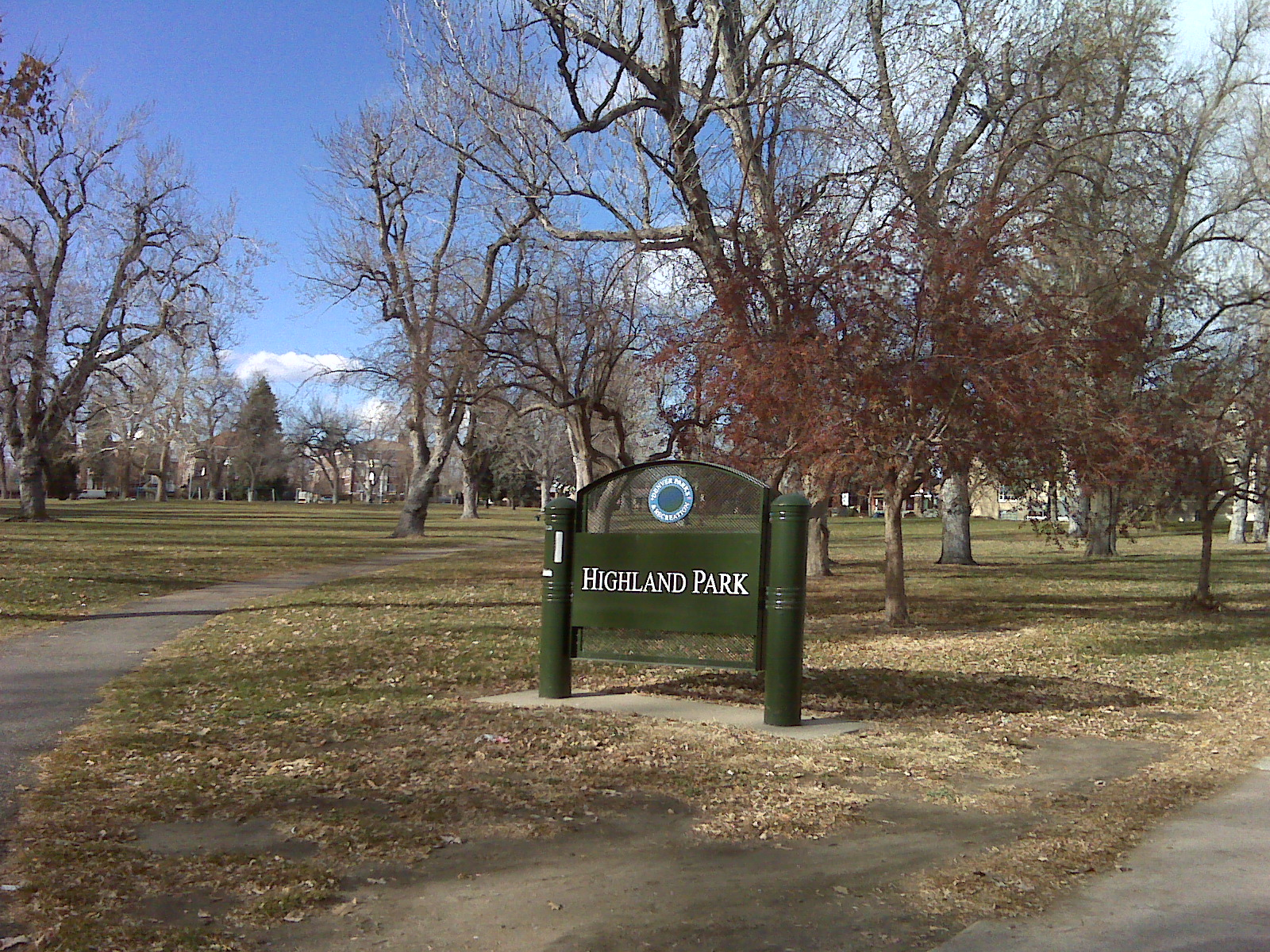
Highland Park

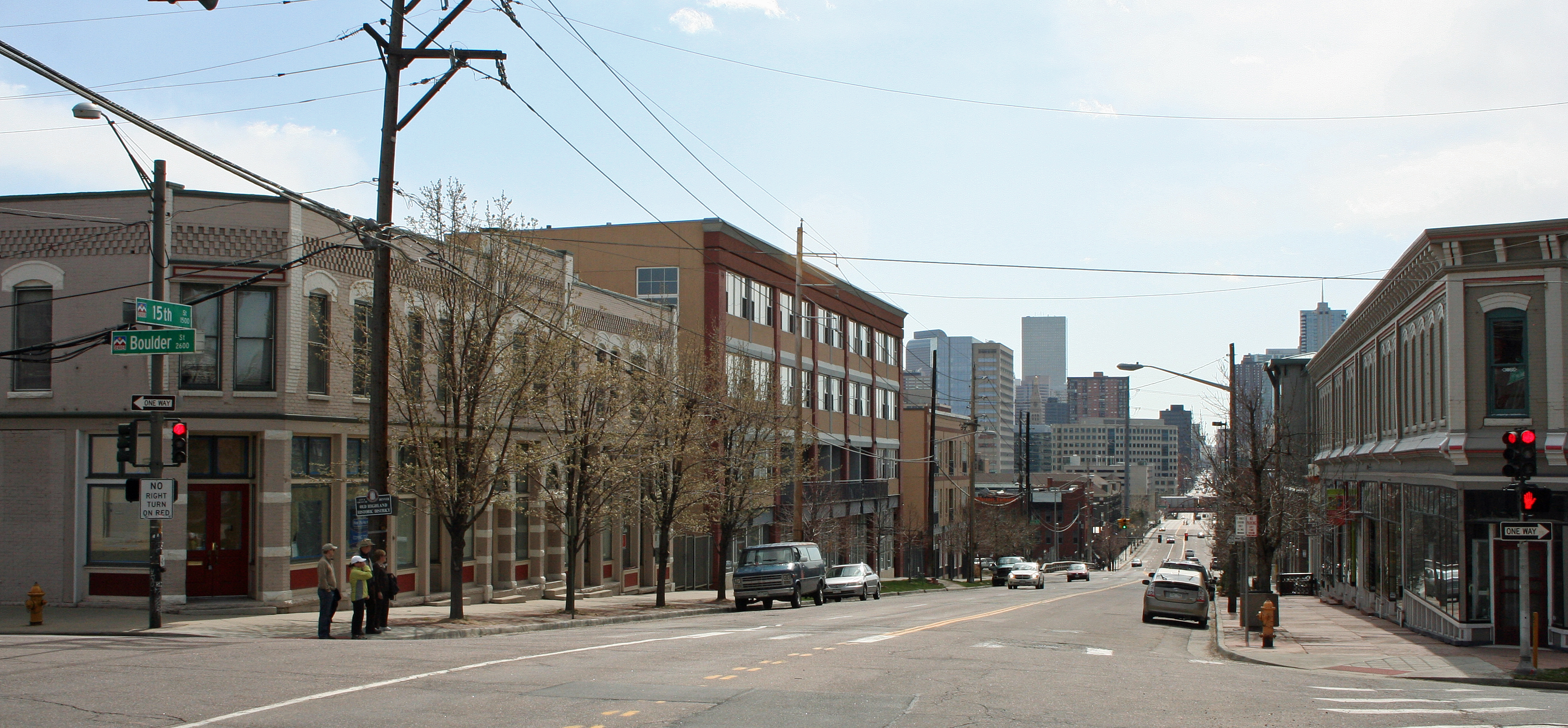
The Old Highland Business District at 15th and Boulder streets

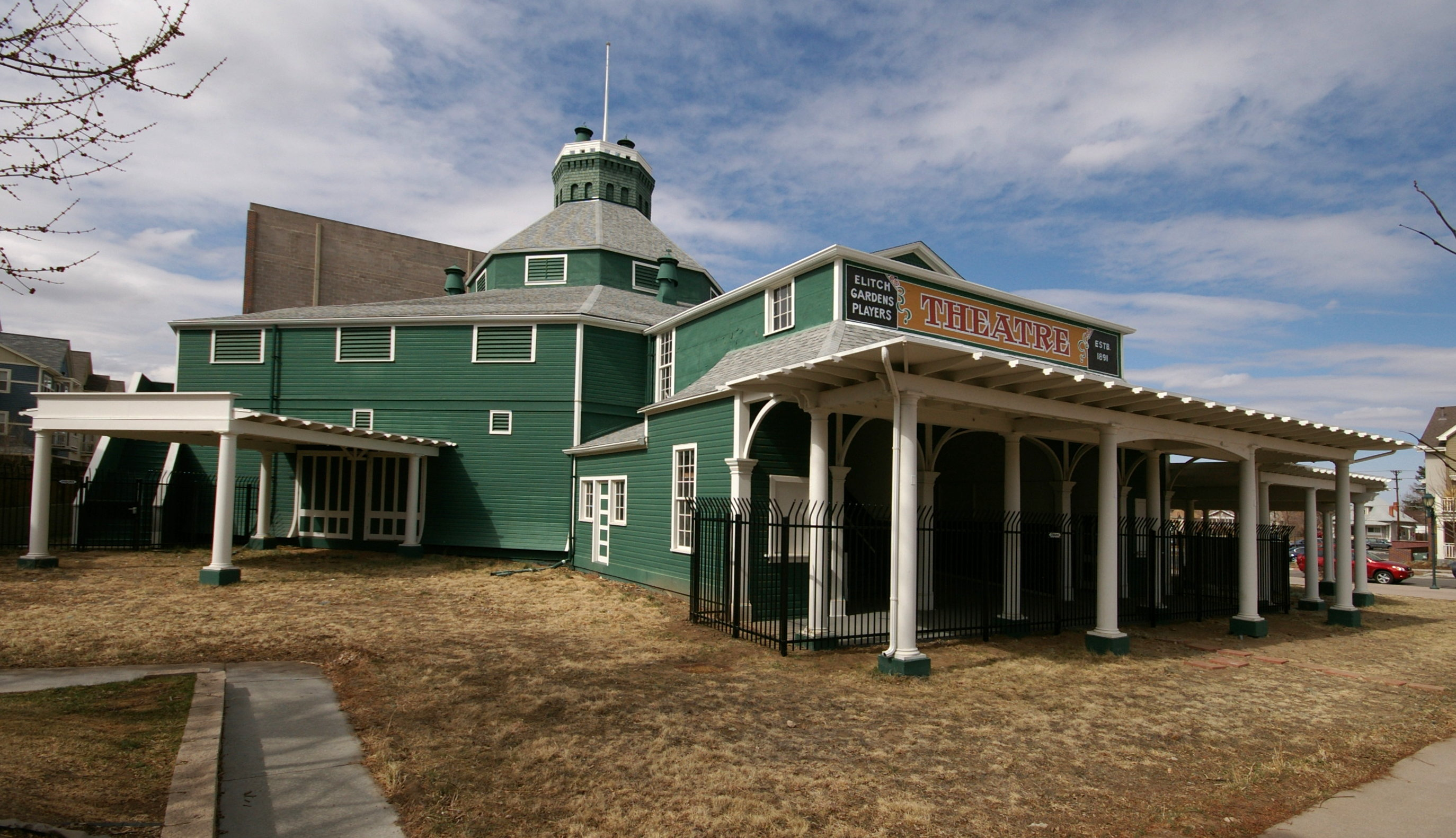
The Historic Elitch Theatre at 38th and Tennyson

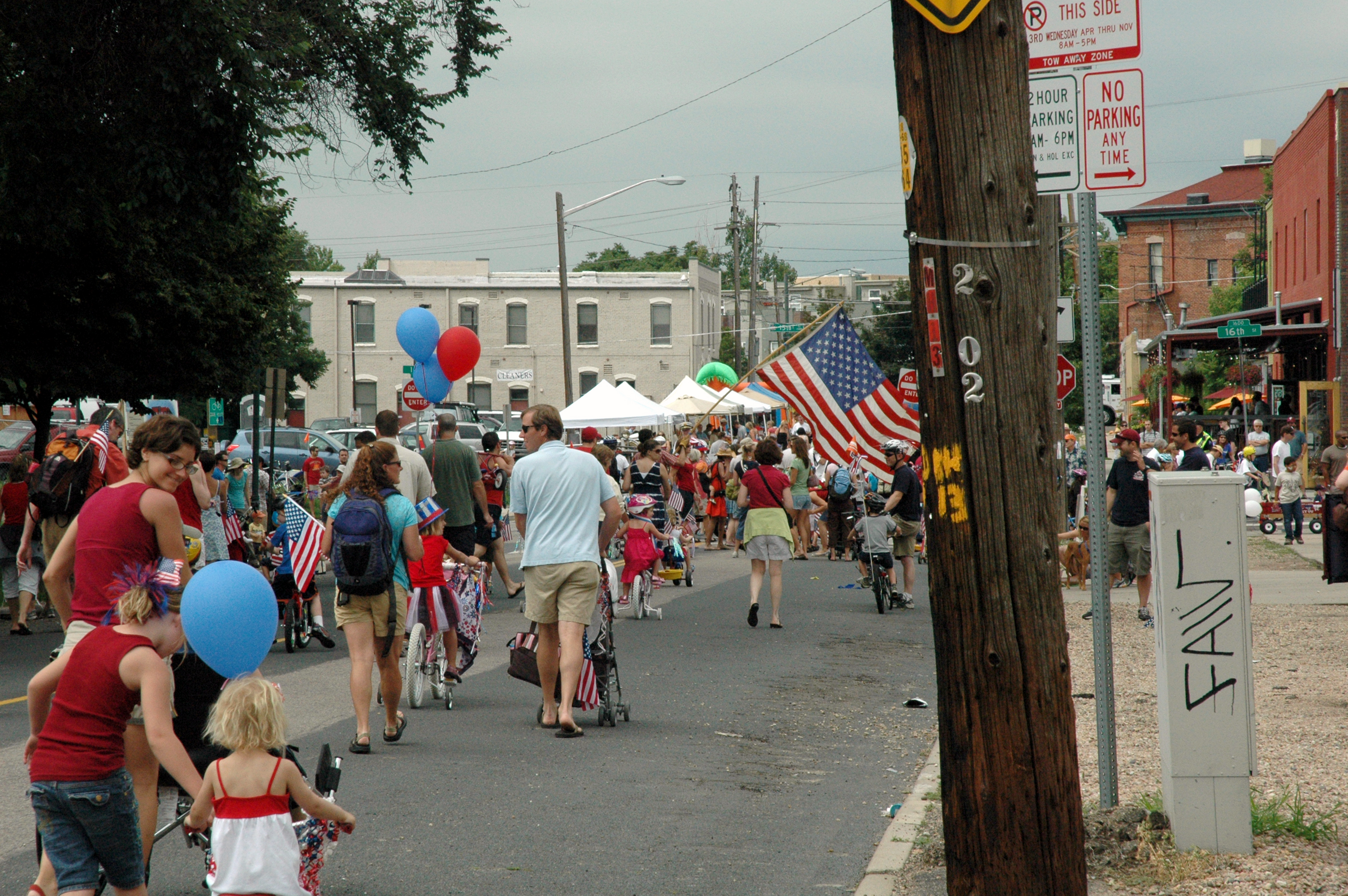
Highland 4 July parade on Boulder Street, 2009

== See also ==
- Bibliography of Colorado
- Geography of Colorado
- History of Colorado
- Index of Colorado-related articles
- List of Colorado-related lists
  - List of neighborhoods in Denver
  - List of populated places in Colorado
- Outline of Colorado
