= Eva French LeFevre =

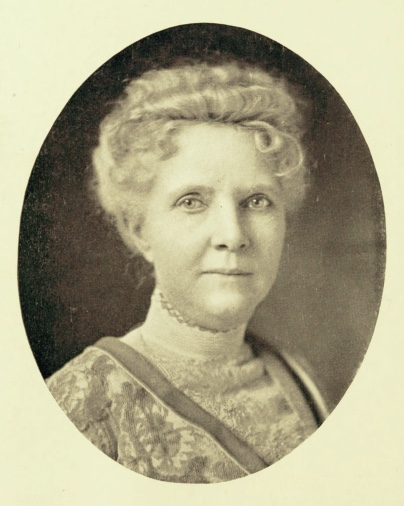
Eva French LeFevre, Representative Women of Colorado, 1914

Eva French LeFevre (October 20, 1851 – June 13, 1948) was a prominent philanthropist and the president of the Denver Orphan's Home. The LeFevres were some of the first pioneers of Denver.

== Early life ==
Eva French was born on October 20, 1851, in Piqua, Ohio, the daughter of Daniel French and Mary P. Heald. She studied at Bryn Mawr College and was a graduate of Ohio Wesleyan University.

== Career ==
LeFevre was active in civic work involving children and education. She was president of the Denver Orphan's Home, secretary of the Wolcott School for Girls, benefactor of the Florence Crittendon Home for Girls and supporter of the Children's Hospital.

She was the original founder of the Charity Organization Society, one of the first charity movements in the country, on the first board of the St. Luke's Hospital and was an active member of the Ladies' Relief Society, an early Denver charity. She was on the board of directors of the Young Women's Christian Association and the oldest member of the Community Chest, which later became the United Way of America.

LeFebvre was director of Art Association and a benefactor of the Denver Art Museum. She was president of the Denver Branch of the American Association of University Women and a member of a number of clubs, including the Denver Women's Club, the Women's Press Club, the Denver Country Club and the Monday Literary Club.

== Personal life ==
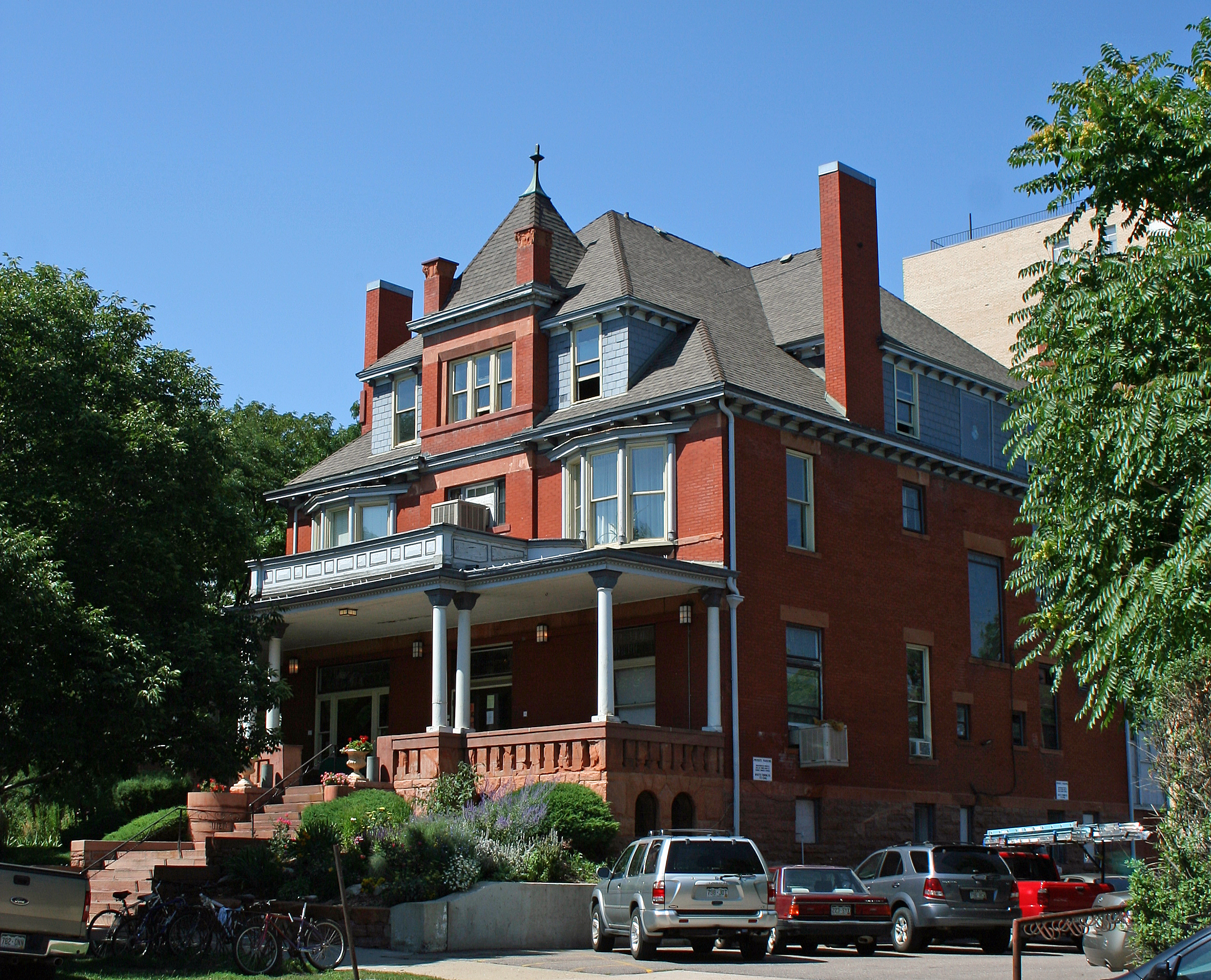
Owen E. LeFevre House, 1311 York Street, Denver, Colorado

On June 28, 1871, she married Owen Edgar LeFevre (1848-1921), a prominent judge in Denver until 1901, and had one daughter, Eva Frederiece LeFevre Bellamy (b. 1884). She moved to Colorado in 1873 and lived at 1311 York St., Denver, Colorado.

Owen E. LeFevre died in 1921, and Eva LeFevre lived at the Owen E. LeFevre House for the rest of her life. She died on June 13, 1948, and is buried at Fairmount Cemetery in Denver.
