= Highlands Historic District =

Highlands Historic District may refer to:

- Original Highlands, Louisville, Kentucky, listed as Highlands Historic District on the NRHP in Kentucky
- Highlands Historic District (Fall River, Massachusetts), listed on the NRHP in Massachusetts
- Highlands Historic District (Meridian, Mississippi), listed on the NRHP in Mississippi
- Highlands Historic District (Moose, Wyoming), listed on the NRHP in Wyoming

== See also ==
- Highland Historic District (disambiguation)
