= Highland Historic District =

Highland Historic District may refer to:

in the United States

- Highland Historic District (Highland, California), listed on the NRHP in California
- Highland Historic District (Middletown, Connecticut), listed on the NRHP in Connecticut
- Highland Historic District (Waterloo, Iowa), listed on the NRHP in Iowa
- Highland Historic District (Shreveport, Louisiana), listed on the NRHP in Louisiana

== See also ==
- Highlands Historic District (disambiguation)
