= Amos H. Root Building =

- U.S. National Register of Historic Places
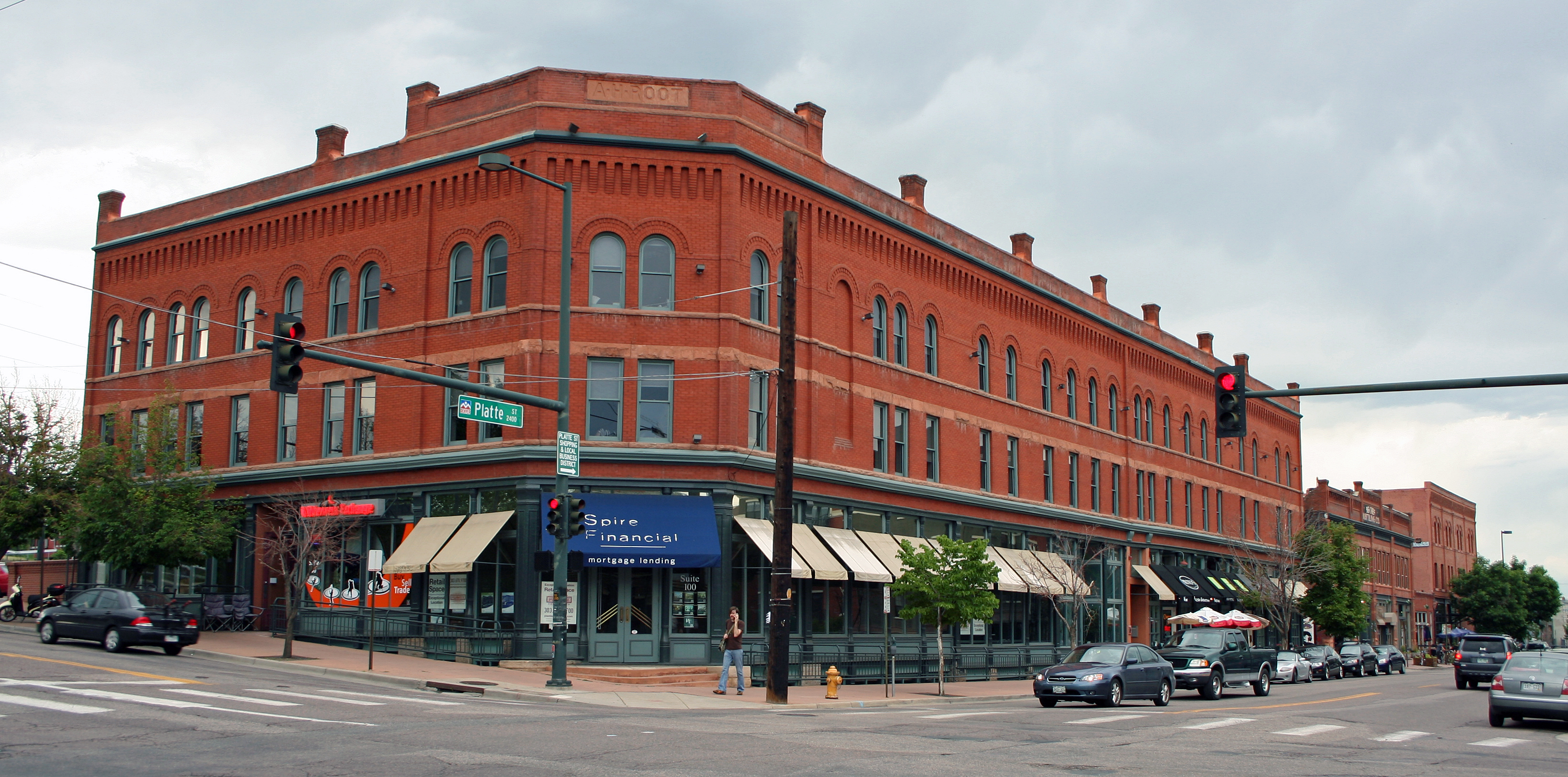
- Building in 2009

- Location within Colorado
- Location: 1501-1529 Platte St., Denver, Colorado
- Coordinates: 39°45′24″N 105°00′32″W
- Area: 0.5 acres (0.20 ha)
- Built: 1884
- NRHP reference No.: 80000894
- Added to NRHP: March 27, 1980

The Amos H. Root Building, or simply the Root Building, at 1501-1529 Platte St. in Denver, Colorado, was built in 1884 for businessman Amos H. Root. It was listed on the National Register of Historic Places in 1980.

The building "displays many elements characteristic of commercial structures of the period."

It was one of the last cast iron structures built in Denver. Its first floor facade is made of cast iron column and beam construction, which supports two stories above of brickwork. Early on, the building served as a drugstore, furniture store, warehouse, and rooming house. Later it became a manufacturing plant for George Washington Olinger's Highland Casket Company, a company which still existed in 1979.

It was deemed "significant for its association with Amos H. Root, an important businessman in Colorado, for its architectural features, and for its role in the commercial development of the downtown Denver."

== Amos H. Root ==
Root was born in 1842 in Schoharie County, New York. After his parents moved him to Ripon, Wisconsin, he began attending Brockway College towards obtaining a law degree. However he enlisted in the 4th Wisconsin Infantry Regiment and served three years in the American Civil War. He was captured in June 1863 by the Confederate Army, but eight days later escaped by way of swimming across the Mississippi River at night. After the war he moved to Greeley, Colorado and began in the hotel business. Later, in Denver, he "became a wholesale dealer in cigars and tobacco, served as a member of the Board of Aldermen, and later entered the banking industry as one of the founders and directors of the North Denver Bank."

== See also ==
- National Register of Historic Places listings in west Denver
