= Sunnyside, Denver =

Neighborhood in Denver, Colorado

Coordinates: 39.7766°N 105.0159°W

Sunnyside on this map of Denver's neighborhoods

Sunnyside is a city-center neighborhood in Denver, Colorado, located in the Northside of Denver, west of Interstate 25.

The neighborhood is bounded by Union Pacific Railroad lines on the east, Interstate 70 on the north, Federal Boulevard on the West and 38th Avenue on the south. It is bordered by the Highland neighborhood on the south and the Chaffee Park neighborhood on the north.

The neighborhood has a community group named Sunnyside United Neighbors, Inc (SUNI).

== See also ==
- Bibliography of Colorado
- Geography of Colorado
- History of Colorado
- Index of Colorado-related articles
- List of Colorado-related lists
  - List of neighborhoods in Denver
  - List of populated places in Colorado
- Outline of Colorado
