= Owen E. LeFevre House =

- U.S. National Register of Historic Places
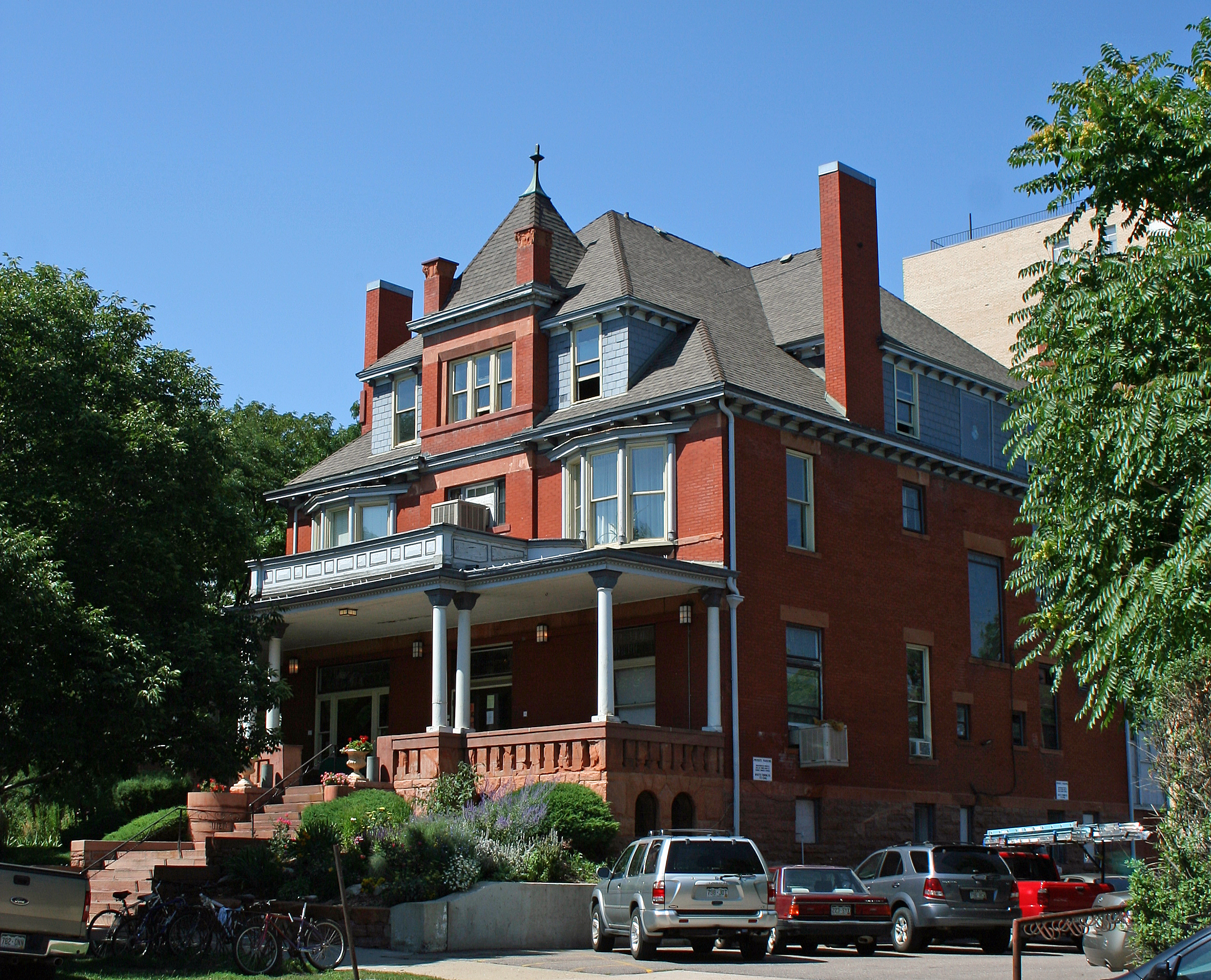

- Location within Colorado Location within the United States
- Location: 1311 York Street, Denver, Colorado
- Coordinates: 39°44′14″N 104°57′35″W
- Area: 0.7 acres (0.28 ha)
- Built: 1896
- Architectural style: Late Victorian, Romanesque
- NRHP reference No.: 76000552
- Added to NRHP: August 13, 1976

The Owen E. LeFevre House is a historic home in Denver, Colorado. It was built prior to 1896, when it became the home of Owen E. LeFevre. At that time it had a carriage entrance gate from 13th Street to the southwest of the house. It was listed on the National Register of Historic Places on August 13, 1976.

== Colonel Charles E. Taylor ==
Built in 1893, architects Kirchner & Kirchner, for Colonel Charles E. Taylor, at a cost of $45,000 (equivalent to $1,741,500 in 2025), the Owen LeFevre House is on the border of the Cheesman Park and Congress Park neighborhoods. It had a wrap-around porch that ran the full length of the south and east sides of the home.

== LeFevre family ==
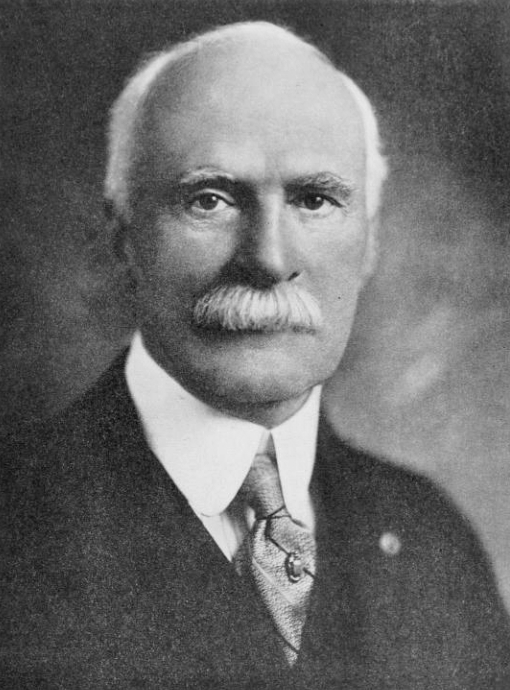
Owen E. LeFevre

Owen E. LeFevre (August 6, 1848 – March 28, 1921) was a lawyer from Dayton, Ohio before coming to Denver in 1873. He was elected the Attorney for Highland in 1875 and 1876 and served two terms as the town's mayor beginning in 1885. He was elected Judge of the county court in 1892 and two years later was elected a Judge of the Second judicial District—Arapahoe County.

LeFevre married Eva French (1852–1948), a graduate of Ohio Wesleyan University, in 1871 and they had a daughter, Fredrica, who was born in 1884. They moved into the York Street house in 1896. It had one of the best libraries in Denver and modern French paintings. It was the "center of art, literature, and music." Eva was on the boards of St. Luke's Hospital, Denver Orphan's Home, and Wolcott School for Girls. She was also a member of artists, literary, and press clubs.

== York Street Club ==
After Eva LeFevre's death the house was sold for $25,000 (equivalent to $335,007 in 2025), a nominal price, to York Street #1, a local group of Alcoholics Anonymous. Over $220,000 from State Historic Funds had been spent to restore it. The LeFevre's house is now the York Street Club.
