= St. Patrick Mission Church =

Historic church in Colorado, United States

- U.S. National Register of Historic Places
- Colorado State Register of Historic Properties
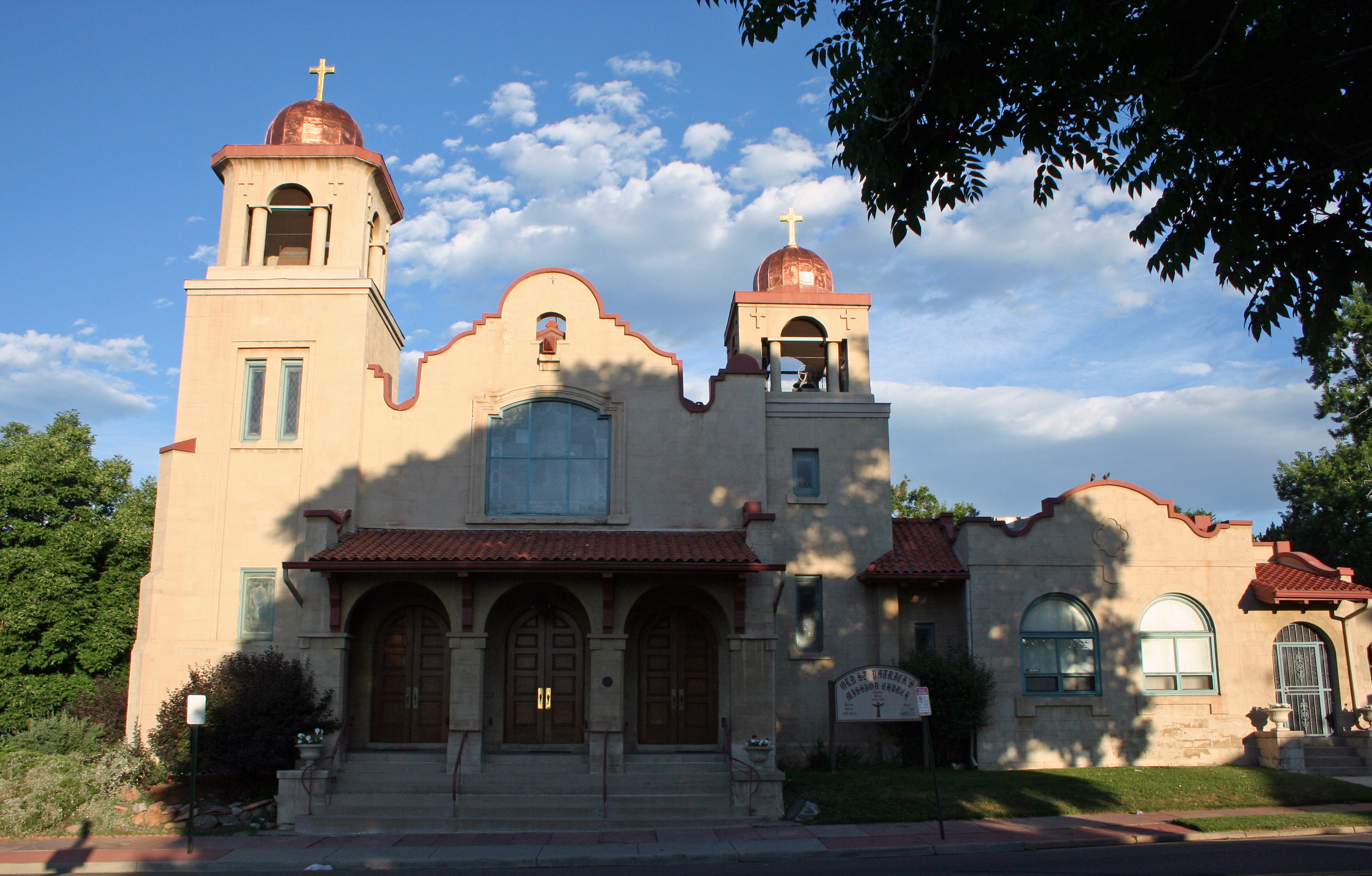

- Location within Colorado Location within the United States
- Location: 3325 Pecos St., Denver, Colorado
- Coordinates: 39°45′49″N 105°0′23″W
- Area: 0.6 acres (0.24 ha)
- Built: 1907
- Architect: Wagner & Manning
- Architectural style: Mission/spanish Revival
- NRHP reference No.: 79000593
- CSRHP No.: 5DV.109
- Added to NRHP: November 14, 1979

The St. Patrick Mission Church in Denver, Colorado, known also as St. Patrick's, is a historic church at 3325 Pecos Street. It was built in 1907 and was added to the National Register of Historic Places in 1979.

The parish was established in 1881.
