= Highland Park (Denver) =

- U.S. National Register of Historic Places
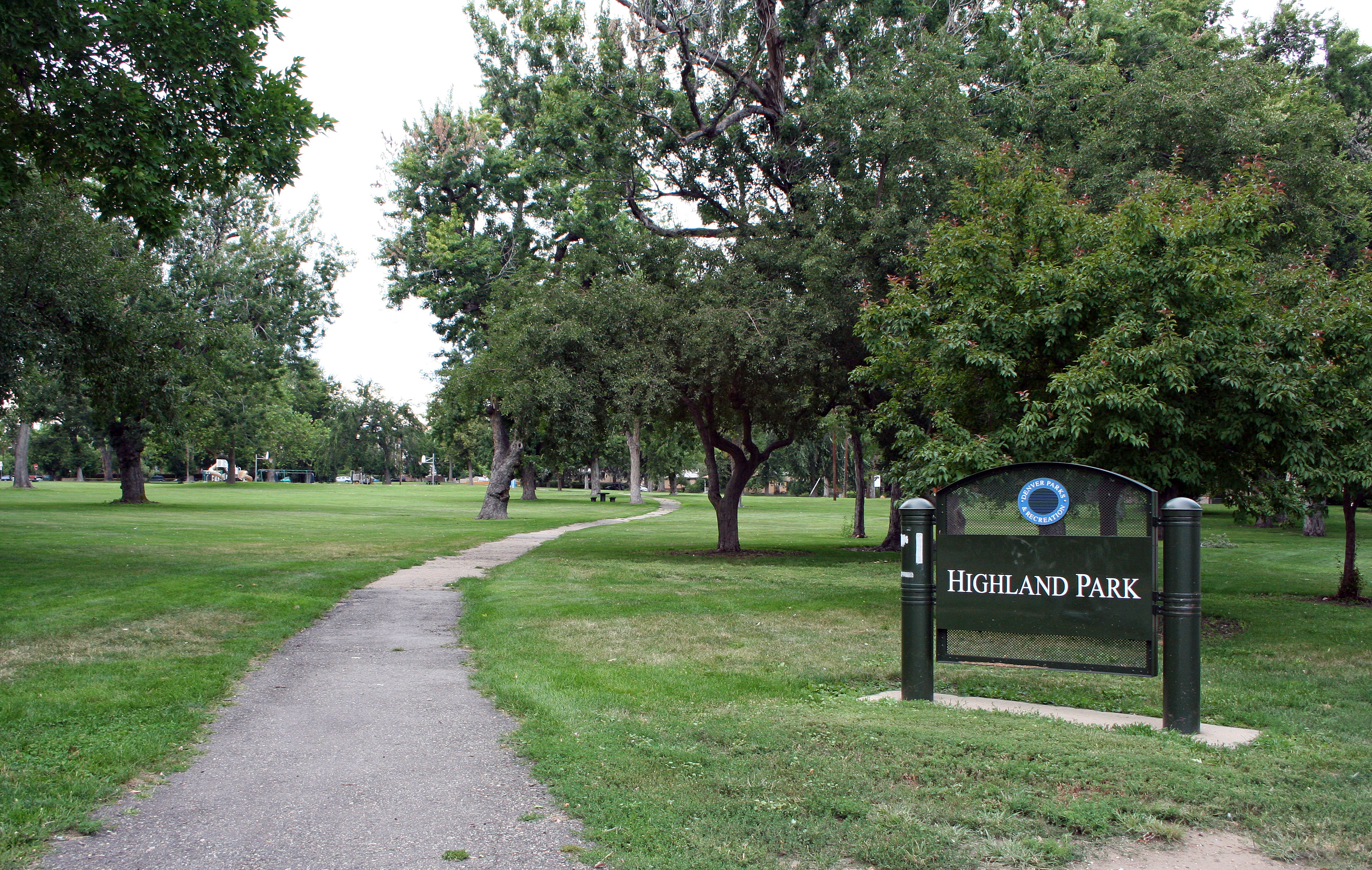

- Location within Colorado
- Location: Roughly bounded by Highland Park Pl., Federal Blvd., and Fairview Pl., Denver, Colorado
- Coordinates: 39°45′47″N 105°01′34″W
- Area: 7 acres (2.8 ha)
- Built: 1907
- Architect: J.B. Benedict
- Architectural style: Florentine
- MPS: Denver Park and Parkway System TR
- NRHP reference No.: 86002248
- Added to NRHP: September 17, 1986

The Highland Park in Denver, Colorado, is a 7-acre (2.8 ha) park area bounded by Highland Park Place, Federal Blvd., and Fairview Place. It was developed as a park in 1907, and since 2013 it has included the Woodbury Branch Library. The park, with the library considered a contributing building, was listed on the National Register of Historic Places in 1986, as part of a Multiple Property Submission of historic resources of Denver's parks and parkways system.

It is a 7-acre (2.8 ha) park which was deemed to have local significance as "a good example of a small multi-use park laid out in the English landscape tradition. The plantings include a sophisticated mix of plant material, including a few Plains Cottonwoods planted as street trees at the turn of the [20th] century." It was developed during 1907-10 by an unknown designer.

The listing included a contributing building (the library) and two contributing structures.

== Woodbury Branch Library ==
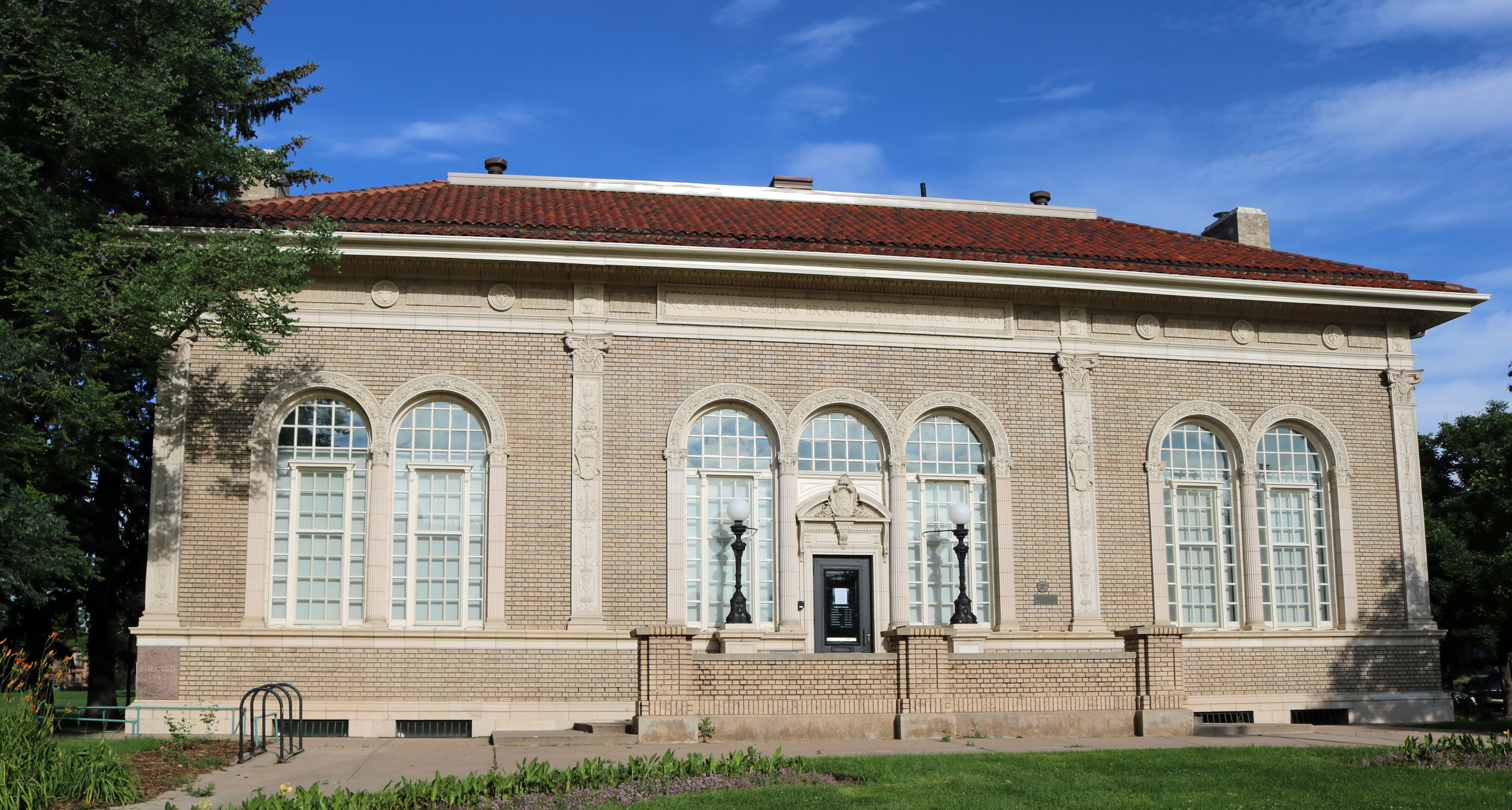
Library in 2016. Its front steps are screened by a brick wall.

The Woodbury Branch Library (or Roger W. Woodbury Branch Library) is a Carnegie library facing Federal Boulevard, at 3265 Federal Blvd. This branch of the Denver Public Library was built in 1913 and "is a significant reminder of the early desire to have the park and parkway system serve as both a setting for other public facilities and a link with surrounding neighborhoods."

The library is named for Roger Williams Woodbury, "a businessman, journalist and banker who served as Denver’s first president of the Chamber of Commerce."

It was funded by the Carnegie Foundation and was designed by architect J.B. Benedict. Its architectural style is termed Renaissance Revival by the Denver Architecture Foundation, although it was described at the time of its construction as Florentine in style. Its facade is symmetrical and is divided into three large bays by two terra cotta pilasters. The bays have two, three, and two arched window openings, each with terra cotta surrounds having cast "Classical and Renaissance motifs". A cartouche over the front entrance gives initials "CCD" for the City and County of Denver. The exterior surface is straw-colored brick; it has a red tile roof. In front of the entrance originally stood "an elegant balustrade" with urns and lamps; at some point this was replaced by a brick wall.

In 1986, the building, "with a not unsympathetic addition to the west," continued to serve as a branch library.

The library has been renovated a number of times. It was renovated again in 2009, by Humphries Poli Architects, of Denver, with funding through the Better Denver Bond of 2007. The renovation focus was "mainly on improving the function, technology, energy-efficiency, building security, comfort and aesthetics of the library." The project cost funded by the bond program was $651,687.

The Denver Architecture Foundation summarizes that the library "features a simple but formal appearance. The Renaissance Revival style of the building is reminiscent of a classical Italian villa with its red clay tile roof, dramatic arched windows and substantial stone pediments."

And it notes that "[p]erhaps the most striking interior features still in use today are the elegantly detailed, exposed wood roof trusses extending the length of the 1913 construction."

The 2009 renovation "was programmed using Denver Public Library's Learning and Language Service style and serves a highly diverse neighborhood population, with a high proportion of teenagers from the nearby North High School. The library includes learning centers in the basement, and exploration, transact and orient focused services on the first and second floors.

In 2022, it further continues as a branch library.

== Other ==
Per the Thematic Resources documentation,

This seven-acre park, which is shaped like a thumb, is flanked by residential streets to the south, west, and north and by Federal Boulevard to the east. The terrain gradually slopes downhill from the west to Federal Boulevard. The site was "reserved" for park use prior to 1893 and was part of the original plan for the Highland Park residential development, but it was not acquired by Denver until 1899.The park lawns were installed in 1907 and by 1910 the park was fully improved with serpentine walkways, flowerbeds along the walkways, and a ring of trees around the perimeter. One of the finest elements of this park is the meticulous use of tree edges to create a clear setting for the park, to integrate the park into the adjoining neighborhood, and to match the design of the then tree lined Federal Boulevard. The experience is both of enclosure within the park and of extension to the outside, and a blend of country and city in a single design. The tree edge is still strong today even with substantial losses in perimeter trees. A number of the stately plains cottonwoods originally planted on the perimeter remain as a reminder of how well adapted that tree is to the High Plains climate. The selection of plant material for this park did not stop with the plains cottonwool. A wide, and, for the time, sophisticated, range of plant material was selected for the site, including sycamore, catalpa, hackberry, honey locust, Kentucky coffeetree, horse chestnut, white and bur oak, Rocky Mountain juniper, cornelian cherry, and larch. The planting of shrubs was, and remains, quite limited. One footpath still extends through the park from southeast to northwest (on an axis parallel to the meadow). The entry of this footpath is flanked by flowering crabapple, but there are none of the footpath flower beds which marked the original design of the park. The grading and layout of this park was as carefully handled as the selection of plant material. The topography falls gently from northwest to southeast as one is led through the course of a meadow, interrupted only by tennis courts first installed in 1911 (as well as a playground and basketball court). The tree planted verges of the meadow are undulating, first confining and then expanding the meadow in the manner so successfully employed by Olmsted and his English predecessors. The result is an illusion of space well beyond the actual acreage of the park."

It was listed as part of a 1986 study of the historic resources of the Denver Park and Parkway System.

== See also ==
- Highland Park Historic District, also NRHP-listed
- National Register of Historic Places listings in west Denver
