= Highland Park Historic District (Wheeling, West Virginia) =

Historic district in West Virginia, United States

- U.S. National Register of Historic Places
- U.S. Historic district
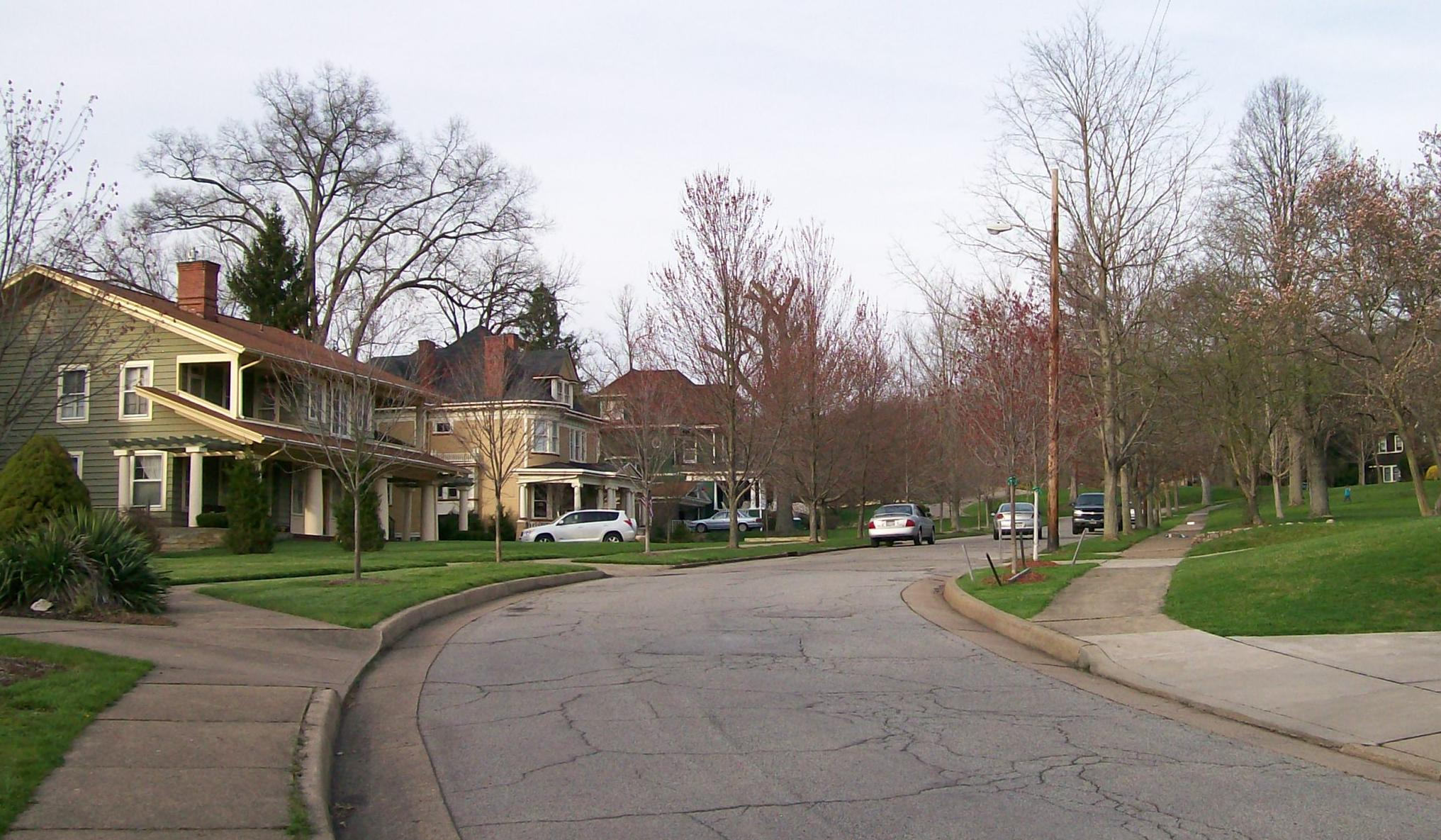
- Highland Park Historic District, April 2010

- Location within West Virginia Location within the United States
- Location: Highland Park, jct. of Lincoln Dr. and National Rd., Wheeling, West Virginia
- Coordinates: 40°3′6″N 80°39′53″W
- Area: 20 acres (8.1 ha)
- Architect: Multiple, including Frederick F. Faris, George S. Mooney
- Architectural style: Late 19th And Early 20th Century American Movements, Late 19th And 20th Century Revivals, Late Victorian
- NRHP reference No.: 93000222
- Added to NRHP: April 7, 1993

Highland Park Historic District is a national historic district located at Wheeling, Ohio County, West Virginia. The residential district includes 12 contributing buildings in the Highland Park subdivision. The houses were built on 18 lots carved from the former farm of Oliver Pryor between 1899 and 1939, and are representative of popular architectural styles during that period. The district includes the original farmhouse, known as the Pryor-Wilson House, built about 1852 with additions and modifications through 1922. The district boundaries encompass an area that once included a stone entrance and two homes designed by noted Wheeling architect Frederick F. Faris (1870–1927). The residents of Highland Park were prominent in the areas of steel, insurance, law, hardware, real estate, and banking.

It was listed on the National Register of Historic Places in 1993.
