= Highland Historic District (Highland, California) =

Historic district in California, United States

- U.S. National Register of Historic Places
- U.S. Historic district
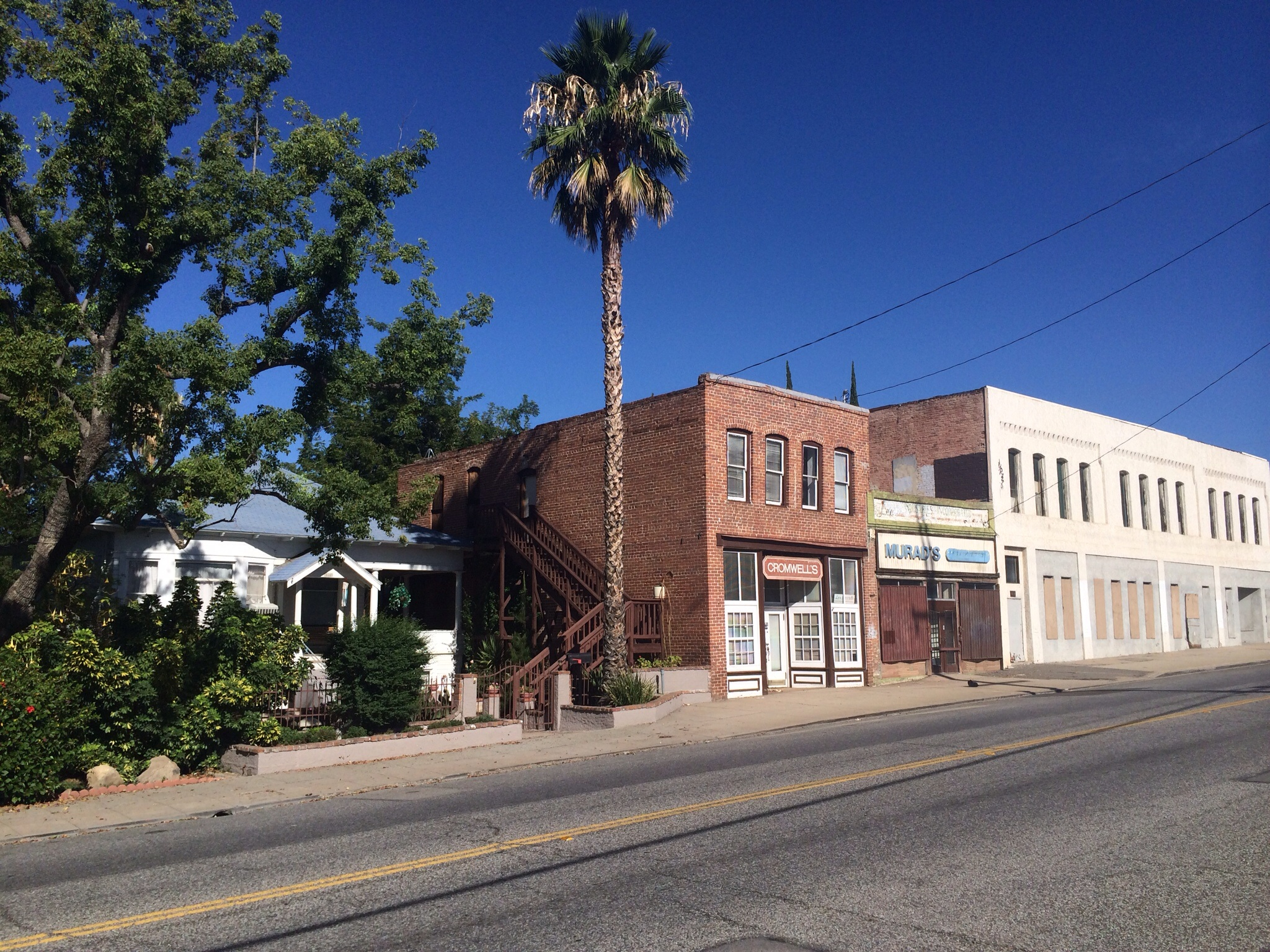
- Businesses on Palm Avenue

- Location within California Location within the United States
- Location: Roughly bounded by Cole and Nona Ave., Pacific and Church Sts., Highland, California
- Coordinates: 34°7′40″N 117°12′29″W
- Area: 29 acres (12 ha)
- NRHP reference No.: 01000333
- Added to NRHP: April 5, 2001

The Highland Historic District is a historic district encompassing some of the oldest parts of Highland, California. The district includes the city's original townsite, which was platted in 1891, and parts of a 1904 addition; significant development in the district continued through 1938. Development in Highland was driven by the citrus industry, Southern California's dominant industry at the time; as Highland was located at the junction of the busy Palm Avenue and the newly completed Santa Fe Railroad, it became a natural industrial center. The district includes the numerous packing houses built along the railroad as well as the city's historic commercial core on Palm Avenue. The houses built in the district also reflect the citrus industry's influence on the city. Wealthy citrus growers lived in the large houses on West Main Street, while citrus workers lived in smaller cottages spread throughout the district.

The district was added to the National Register of Historic Places on April 5, 2001.
