= Highland Park, Oakland, California =

Neighborhood of Oakland, California, US

Coordinates: 37°47′52″N 122°13′39″W

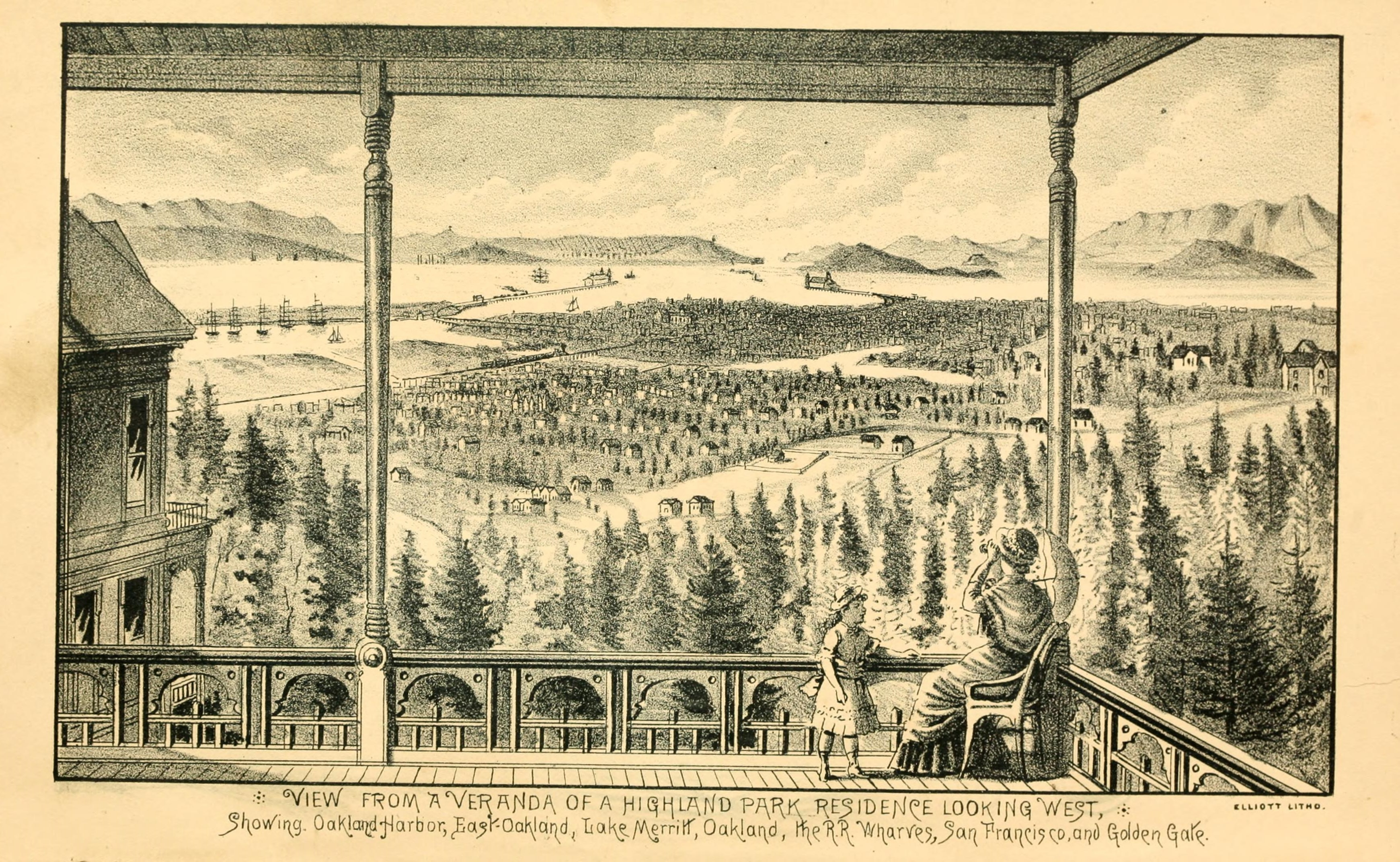
View from a veranda of a Highland Park residence looking west; 1885 illustration

Highland Park is a neighborhood in Oakland in Alameda County, California. It lies at an elevation of 194 feet (59 m).
