= St. Dominic's Church (Denver) =

Historic church in Colorado, United States

- U.S. National Register of Historic Places
- Colorado State Register of Historic Properties
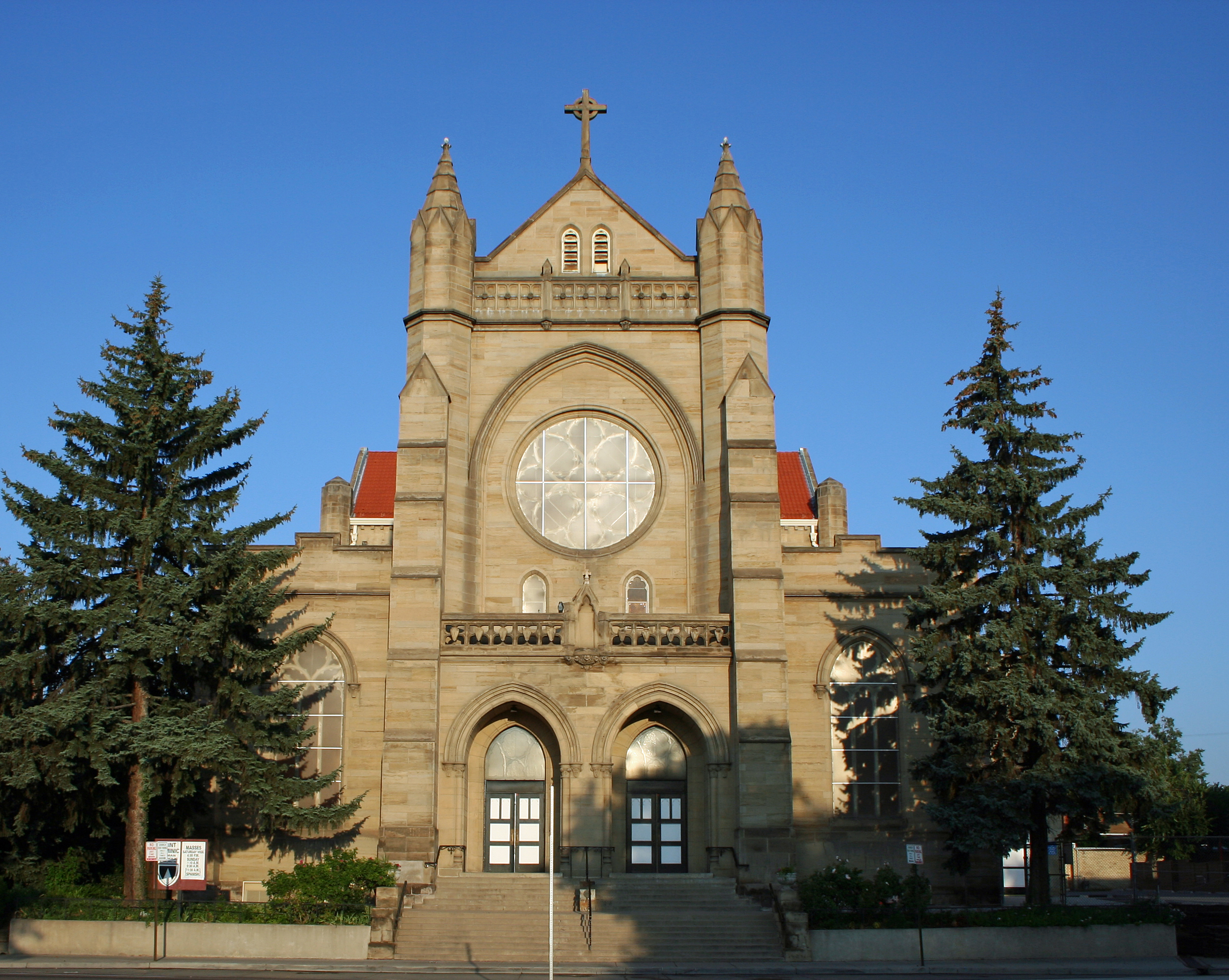

- Location within Colorado Location within the United States
- Location: 3005 W. 29th Ave., Denver, Colorado
- Coordinates: 39°45′32″N 105°1′31″W
- Area: less than one acre
- Built: 1923-26
- Architect: Willison, Robert
- Architectural style: Late Gothic Revival
- NRHP reference No.: 96001236
- CSRHP No.: 5DV.606
- Added to NRHP: November 1, 1996

St. Dominic's Church is a historic church in Denver, Colorado, at 3005 W. 29th Avenue. It was built during 1923 to 1926 and added to the National Register of Historic Places in 1996.

Described as Late Gothic Revival in style overall, it is said to exhibit "characteristics of the middle to late Ravonnant and Flamboyant styles." It has a Latin Cross plan. It is 165 feet (50 m) long, 85 feet (26 m) wide, and 80 feet (24 m) high (rooftop level). It has a rose window in a tall parapeted gable.
