= Jefferson Park, Denver =

Neighborhood in Denver, Colorado, United States

Coordinates: 39.7512°N 105.0205°W

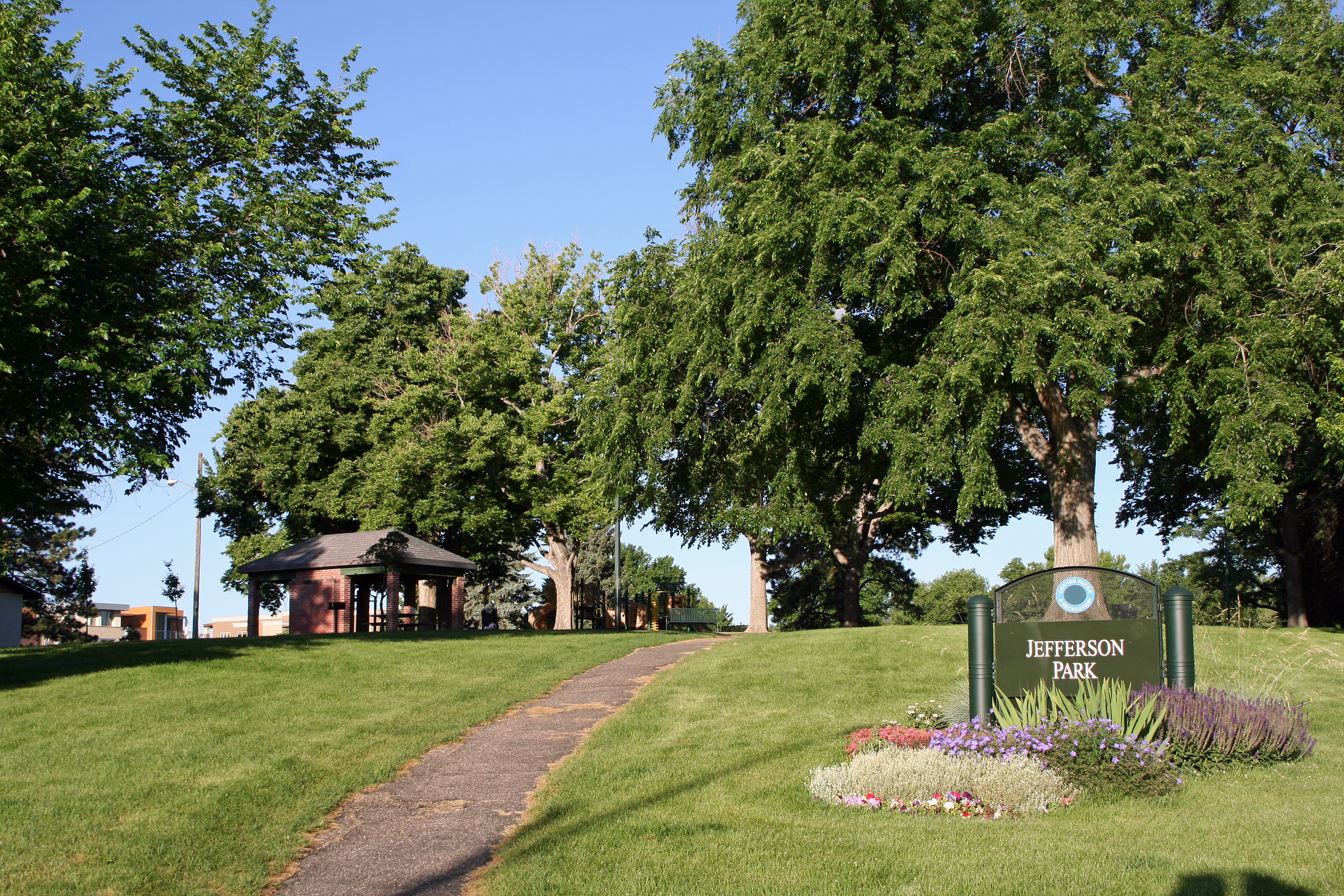
Jefferson Park, the park for which the neighborhood is named.

Jefferson Park is a neighborhood and public park that overlooks Downtown Denver, Colorado from its perch across Interstate 25 (I-25). It is located in the area that is called North Denver. Views east from Jefferson Park take in Elitch Gardens Theme Park, The Children's Museum, Denver's Downtown Aquarium, Pepsi Center, the REI flagship store and other attractions in Downtown's Central Platte Valley. Downtown Denver and the Central Platte Valley are quickly accessed from Jefferson Park, using the 23rd Avenue overpass on I-25 and Water Street. In addition, the Light Rail C-Line is located by Empower Field at Mile High in the southern part of the neighborhood.

== Geography ==
Jefferson Park sits on a bluff just to the northwest of Denver's downtown core, providing it views of Denver's Central Platte Valley. The boundaries of the neighborhood are:

- South - Colfax
- North - Speer Boulevard
- East - Platte River
- West - Federal Boulevard

== History ==
=== Old Highland ===
Although previous claims were made to an area called Highland on the northwest side of the South Platte River, the first recognized by the U.S. Government was included in An Act for the Relief of the Citizens of Denver, on May 28, 1864. A portion of the Jefferson Park neighborhood, today bound Speer Boulevard on the north, Interstate 25 on the West, the South Platte River on the East, and a line extending eastward from West 23rd Avenue, was included in the land grant, part of Range 68W, Section 33, in South Township 3.

=== The Town of Highland ===
The Town of Highland (no "s") was originally platted by Horatio B. Bearce in 1873 which includes the portion of the Jefferson Park neighborhood bound by W. 26th Avenue, Federal Boulevard, W 23rd Avenue, and old Zuni Street, now replaced by Interstate 25. In 1875, the Town of Highlands was incorporated, and included the original Town of Highland together with surrounding subdivisions. Jefferson Park (the park) is located in Crane's Addition to the Town of Highlands. The Town of Highlands was considered Denver's first suburb. In 1890, when the population grew large enough for the area to be considered the City of Highlands, a city hall was constructed at the Southwest corner of West 26th Avenue and Federal Boulevard, now the site of Denver Fire Station 12. Federal was simply referred to as "The Boulevard", becoming Federal after annexation by Denver.

During the late-19th century the political rivalry between Denver and Highlands became very heated. The City of Highlands was intended to be an elite suburb, a residential community with the men earning their living in Denver and retiring in the evening to Highlands. Highlanders were a very proud people, proud of their pure air, pure water (artesian aquifer), fine homes, good schools and high morals. Highlands was a blue law town at a time when Denver was known coast to coast for its gambling, prostitution, and racy life. The problem for Highlands was access to Denver, where the jobs were. Highlands, with its gracious and crime free lifestyle kept thumbing its nose at Denver with its railroad yards, tanneries, mills, and a famous red-light district, inciting the ire of Denver Mayor Wolfe Londoner. Londoner simply told the poorly connected citizens of Highland that the price of a viaduct across the rail yards and the Platte River was annexation.

=== Becoming Jefferson Park ===
In 1896, the City of Highlands was annexed, and thereafter was known as "North Denver". As the city grew larger and the name "North Denver" started to encompass a larger area the new neighborhood was renamed Jefferson Park, from the 6.7-acre (27,000 m^{2}) park located on West 23rd Avenue and Clay Street in the heart of the neighborhood. The park was part of an undeveloped portion of Crane's Addition to the Town of Highlands before annexation, and became part of the Highland Division of the City of Denver Parks, landscaped in the early 20th century and then named after former President Thomas Jefferson.

Highlands was made up of 35 subdivisions with the street names, directions and lot sizes not conforming to the Denver norm. As a general rule, building was permitted on 25-foot (7.6 m) lots, and some builders would put up a row of small gothic cottages, built very close together, and surrounded by acres of vacant lots. Any block, in Jefferson Park today, may have houses representing the architecture of the 1890s, 1910s, 1920s 1940s, and 1950s. After the building boom that occurred following the end of World War II, there was very little vacant property left in North Denver.

By the 1960s, Denver was experiencing its own white flight, as many American cities were, and the neighborhoods in the inner core of the city started feeling the effects. Properties in Jefferson Park were abandoned for the suburbs, and as the recession of the late 1970s and early 1980s hit Denver violence and crime increased throughout the neighborhood.

== Jefferson Park's renaissance ==
By the 1990s Jefferson Park's location, affordable housing, and neighborhood feel brought it back to the attention of the city and home-buyers that were tired of long commutes and wanted an urban lifestyle. Jefferson Park was made a focus neighborhood by the city of Denver and investment in infrastructure and beautification began. Eventually, Jefferson Park United Neighbors (or JPUN) was formed in 2000, after a controversial large-scale development by Sullivan-Hayes was proposed.

The residents of Jefferson Park banded together and formed JPUN after the now defunct Jefferson Park Neighborhood Association (JPNA) failed to act. The neighbors formed JPUN, created by-laws, and fought Sullivan-Hayes by talking to their council people and Mayor Wellington Webb.

The proposed development which would have condemned many 19th Century homes and turned the park into an amphitheater was defeated. It was at this point that the residents turned their attention to improving the neighborhood.

== Today ==
Today, Jefferson Park is marked by a variety of housing styles and architecture from various eras. Single family homes from the late 19th century stand next to apartment complexes built in the 1950s and a current boon of development at the turn of the millennium. Jefferson Park is currently experiencing a renaissance in investment and development due to its proximity to downtown Denver.

In 2010, the neighborhood had 2,522 residents.

The racial breakdown of the neighborhood is 68.7% white, 2.1% African American, 1.5% Asian, 1.9% Native American. Hispanic or Latino of any race is 44.3% of the population. Jefferson Park has one of the higher poverty rates in the city with 30.03% of the population in poverty. The crime rate in Jefferson Park is at 76 incidents per 1,000 people. The average crime rate for Denver neighborhoods is 68 incidents per 1000 people. In 2007, Jefferson Park was one of the top five neighborhoods that saw the greatest decrease in crime, down 29.3%. Between 2009 and 2010, Jefferson Park crimes rates dropped by 2.6%.

The average price per square foot of a residential home in Jefferson Park in May 2017 was $369.49.

== See also ==
- Bibliography of Colorado
- Geography of Colorado
- History of Colorado
- Index of Colorado-related articles
- List of Colorado-related lists
  - List of neighborhoods in Denver
  - List of populated places in Colorado
- Outline of Colorado
