= Highland Park Historic District (Denver) =

Historic district in Colorado, United States

- U.S. National Register of Historic Places
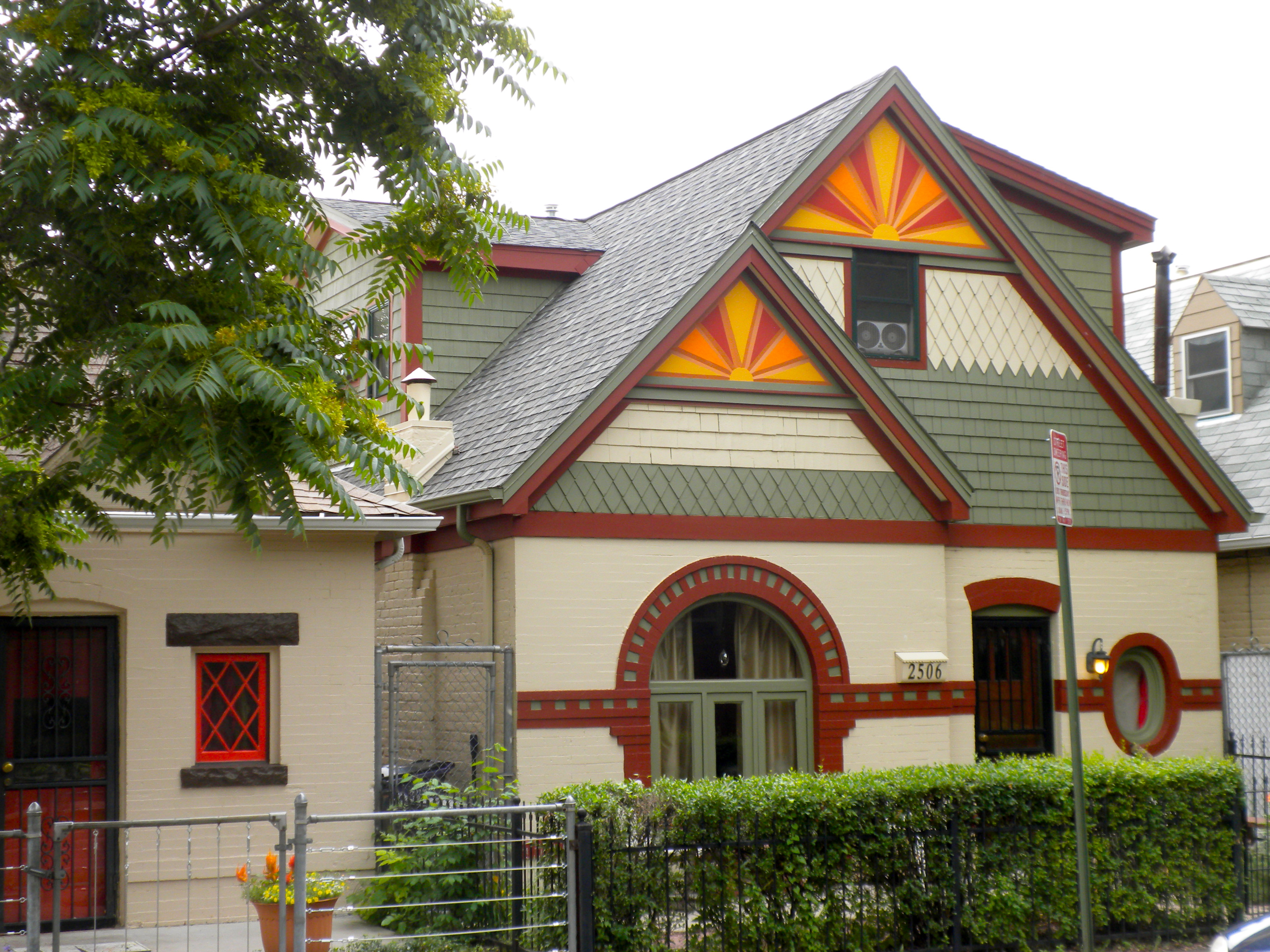
- House near intersection of Fife and Argyle in 2010

- Location within Colorado
- Location: Bounded by Zuni St., Dunkeld Pl., Clay St., and 32nd Ave., Denver, Colorado
- Coordinates: 39°45′39″N 105°01′02″W
- Area: 23.8 acres (9.6 ha)
- Built: 1874
- Architect: General William Jackson Palmer; Dr. William A. Bell
- Architectural style: Gothic, Queen Anne, Classic Cottage, Mission
- NRHP reference No.: 85000082
- Added to NRHP: January 18, 1985

The Highland Park Historic District in Denver, Colorado is a 23.8 acres (9.6 ha) historic district which was listed on the National Register of Historic Places in 1985. It has also been known as Scottish Village.

It includes "the only segment of the original Highland Park subdivision to remain intact", with 133 contributing buildings on 23.8 acres (9.6 ha).

The district is bounded by Zuni St., Dunkeld Pl., Clay St., and 32nd Ave.
