= Berkeley, Denver =

Neighborhood of Denver, Colorado, United States

Coordinates: 39.7767°N 105.0393°W

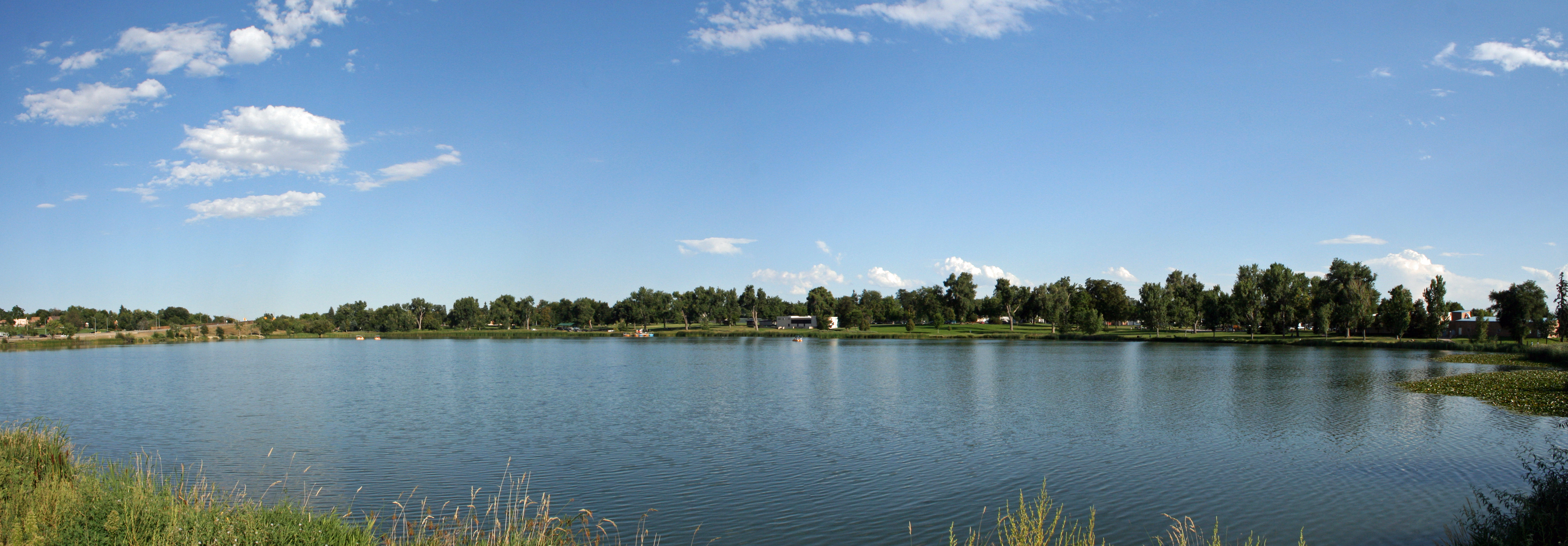
Berkeley Lake Park in Denver's Berkeley Neighborhood

Berkeley is a city-center neighborhood in Denver, Colorado, located in the area traditionally called the "Northside", on the west side of Interstate 25 and just south of Interstate 70.

== History ==
The Berkeley, Colorado, post office operated from October 24, 1890, until May 18, 1896. The Town of Berkeley was officially annexed by the new City and County of Denver on December 1, 1902.

== Neighborhood ==
The neighborhood is bounded by Federal Boulevard on the east, I-70 on the north, Sheridan Boulevard on the West and 38th avenue on the south. It is bordered by the West Highland neighborhood on the south and is often erroneously grouped together with the Highlands. The neighborhood contains two lakes surrounded by parks, one eponymous (stretching from 46th Avenue to I-70 and Sheridan Boulevard to Tennyson Street) and Rocky Mountain Lake Park (stretching from Lowell Boulevard to Grove Street and 46th Avenue to I-70).

Berkeley Park also contains the William Scheitler Recreation Center, run by the City and County of Denver and including both indoor and outdoor public pools. Berkeley has experienced rapid growth and rise in property values in the last 20 years and particularly since the closing of Elitch Gardens Amusement Park in October 1994. Particularly, Tennyson Street has become a commercial and cultural center for Northwest Denver, beginning in the current decade to rival Highland Square in nearby Highland. City Congressman Rick Garcia pushed for the further development of Tennyson Street in the November 2011 election season and succeeded in obtaining the voters' approval for $2.5 million in public works funding. Business owners on Tennyson from 48th Avenue to 38th Avenue currently collaborate in an Art Walk held on the first Friday of every month.

The average price per square foot in June 2019 was $330.

== See also ==
- List of neighborhoods in Denver
- List of populated places in Colorado
