= Ruby Hill =

Ruby Hill may refer to:

- Ruby Hill, Denver
- Ruby Hill, Nevada
- Ruby Hill Terrain Park in Denver
- Ruby Hill Railroad (List of Nevada railroads)
- Ruby Hill Winery in the Livermore Valley AVA
- Ruby Hill (singer) (1922–2004), American singer
- Ruby Hill (bowls), English bowls player
- Ruby Hill, character on the television show Good Girls played by Retta
