= Montbello, Denver =

Neighborhood in Denver, Colorado

Montbello
- Neighborhood
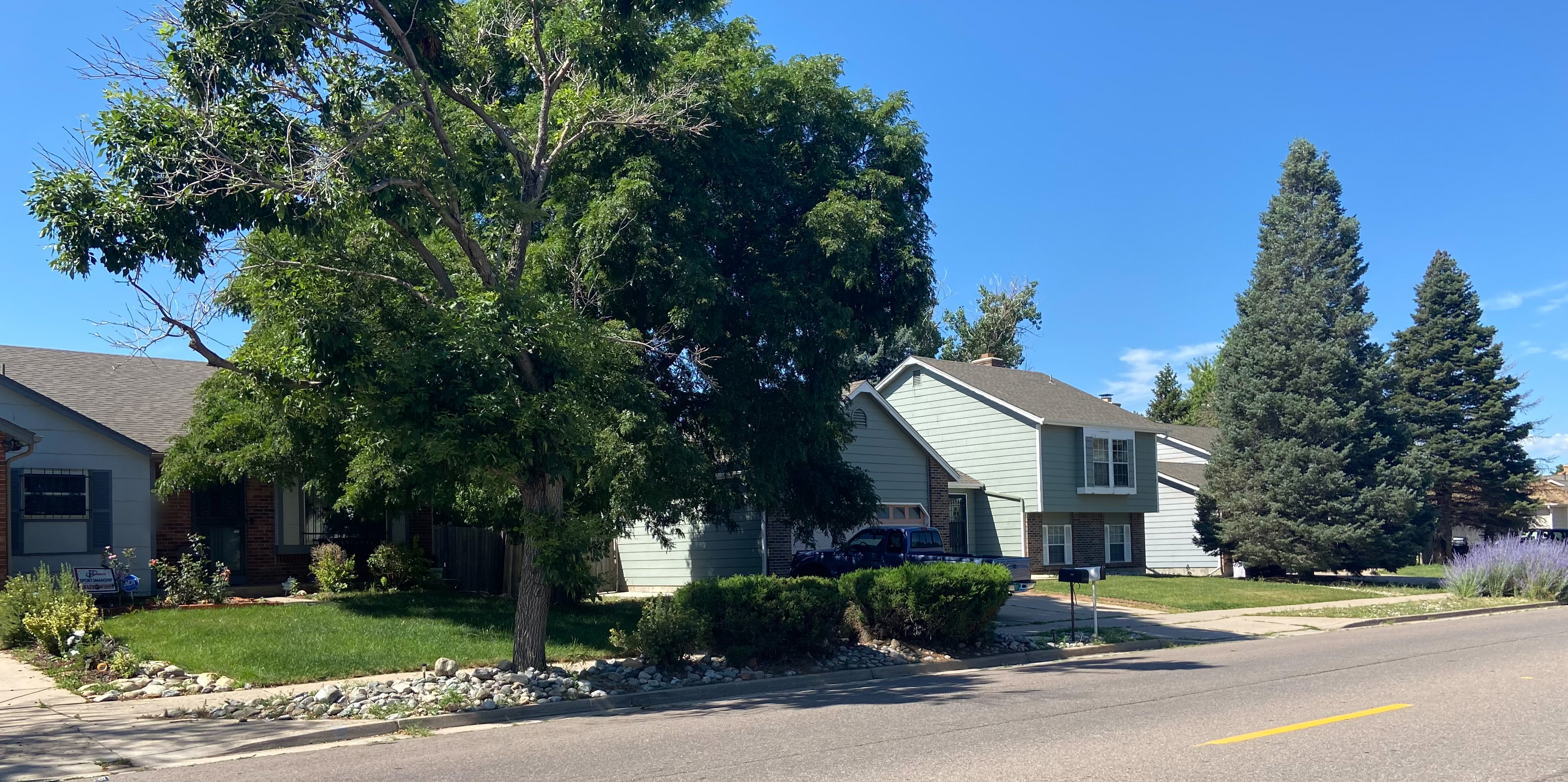
- Montbello street in summer (2023)

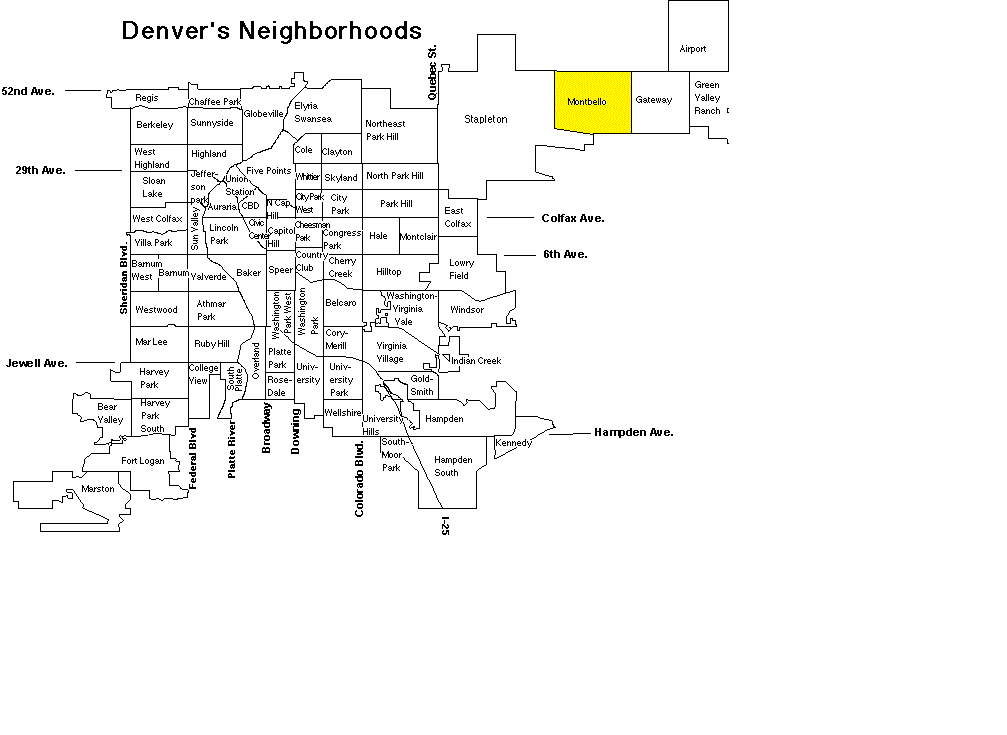
- Map of Denver’s neighborhoods, Montbello is highlighted in yellow.
- Coordinates: 39.7936°N 104.8336°W
- Country: United States
- State: Colorado
- City and County: Denver
- Elevation: 5,295 ft (1,614 m)

Population (2020)
  - Total: 33,121
- ZIP Code: 80238, 80239

Montbello is a neighborhood of Denver, Colorado, located in the far northeast of the city. It is bounded on its north side by E 56th Avenue and the Rocky Mountain Arsenal National Wildlife Refuge, on its south side by the I-70/I-225 junction, by Peoria Street on its western confine and Chambers Road on its east.

It is the most populous neighborhood in all of Denver with over 30,000 inhabitants and around 9,000 housing units but holds a lower density than most, at approximately 6,000 people per square mile.

== History ==
During and after the WWII period, Denver experienced a housing crisis. Black and Hispanic communities typically redlined into areas like Whittier, Five Points and west Denver neighborhoods like Valverde and Athmar Park, and recently returned war veterans were experiencing notably poor housing conditions by the mid-century mark. Military personnel for Fort Logan and Buckley Air Force Base were also lacking housing that had been promised to them in the 40's and 50's. The Stapleton administration in charge at the time was admonished by the press for lack of interest in expanding Denver's settlements. Over the next few decades, solutions to the crisis were tackled by building outward.

In the first half of the 20th century, the land that would eventually become Montbello was initially within Adams County, one piece of a larger section of undeveloped farmland. Several acres were purchased and owned by Miller Enterprises, Inc. in the mid-50's. During the post-World War II housing boom, Perl-Mack Construction Company, founded by Jordan Perlmutter and Sam Primack, were hired privately for design and construction within these allotted subdivisions. The new enclaves were intended to be “self-sufficient” communities and they were supposedly named Montbello, Italian for “beautiful mountain”, due to their “spectacular views of…the Continental Divide”, though some sources state the naming of the settlement had no intended meaning. These early homes broke ground around the same time as other Perl-Mack suburban projects, including Northglenn and North Aurora.

=== Incorporation ===
Montbello was officially purchased, annexed and incorporated into the city of Denver by the Currigan administration in September 1965 and building, overseen by the city, began the following year. The annexation included almost 3,000 acres of land. The planning focused on mixed-use zoning for homes, public parks and schools, and intended to be more “automobile-oriented” than older parts of Denver. Homes of the 60's and 70's were built mostly in the modern soap-box ranch (sometimes split-level) style, often having brick exteriors, attached garages and basements, while later homes were built in multi-level styles. On account of the several thousand acres of empty grassland that came with the purchase, homebuilding in Montbello continued into the early 2000s.

In spite of state fair housing laws put forth in 1959, realtors of the later 20th century were accused of dramatic “racial steering”, discouraging their white clients from buying homes in the more diverse Montbello and, in effect, helping to mold the demographics of the current populace.

=== Current Issues ===
Montbello, along with Gateway-Green Valley Ranch and DIA neighborhoods, lies along the northern end of a geographic phenomenon some city historians call the “inverted L”, used to loosely describe socioeconomic patterns and disparities in Denver's urban planning. Since the start of the 21st century, neighborhoods that sit on the outer edges of I-25 and I-70, further from the city center, tend to be lower income, less white and less environmentally healthy. Montbello has been considered a “food desert” since 2014, with over 33,000 residents being served by only one partial-service grocery store. The nearest full-service stores are in adjacent neighborhoods.

During the boom of the late 1990s and early 2000s, real estate prices in these ZIP codes were high and in sync with the rest of metro Denver. In 2017, The Denver Post named Montbello the "nation’s hottest suburban housing market". As the population of Denver grows, residents have raised concerns about gentrification and being displaced by increasing housing costs and investor interest.

== Education ==
=== Public Schools ===
- Escalante-Biggs Academy (ECE-K)
- Maxwell Elementary
- Barney Ford Elementary
- Monarch Montessori Of Denver (Public Charter Montessori k-5th)
- Oakland Elementary
- John Amesse Elementary
- McGlone Academy (ECE-8)
- Marie L. Greenwood (K-8)
- Farrell B. Howell (ECE-8)
- Montbello High School
- DSST: Elevate Northeast Middle School
- DSST: Elevate Northeast High School

The closing of Montbello High School, voted on in 2010, was controversial and met with pushback from several in the community, some of whom felt that the school was “the heart of Montbello”. The slow phase-out left the neighborhood with no publicly-run, comprehensive high school and the campus was subsequently used by three different, smaller specialized schools, an arrangement termed “co-location”. In 2021, after years of advocacy by some families, educators and alumni, the Denver Public School board voted to reopen Montbello High School and put funding toward campus reconstruction. It welcomed its first returning class in fall 2022.

== Demographics ==
As of the 2020 U.S. census, the total population of Montbello was at 33,121 individuals. 32.9% of the population were under 18 years old.

The approximate racial/ethnic composition of Montbello in the year 2020 was:

- Hispanic or Latino (of any race): 65.4% (residents of Mexican ancestry made up 58.5% of the total population)
- Black or African American (alone): 20.8%
- White (alone, non-Latino): 7.4%
- Asian (alone): 1.97%
- American Indian/Alaska Native (alone or in combination): 1.13%
- Native Hawaiian/Pacific Islander (alone or in combination) 1.17%
- Two or more races (non-Latino): 2.46%

As of 2020, 54.8% of individuals over five years old spoke Spanish at home. Approximately 15.8% of the population of all ages were below the poverty line.

== Neighborhood Organizations ==
- Far Northeast Neighbors
- Montbello 20/20
- Montbello Organizing Committee
- Steps to Success
- Montbello Neighborhood Improvement Association
- Struggle of Love Foundation

The Montbello Organizing Committee, MOC for short, is a CDC non-profit that sprung from grassroots organizing by members of the Montbello community in 2013. Today, they state that their board members and stakeholders are attempting to address the issues of increasing housing costs, the lack of nearby full-service grocery stores, disproportionate unemployment and unstable quality of education. Some of their current funding partners include the Colorado Health Foundation and the City of Denver. They hope to grow affordable housing for current and new residents without causing displacement.

In 2023, the Montbello FreshLo hub, an "$85 million community-led development", broke ground. The FreshLo hub is located at 12444 East Albrook Drive and will include:

- 97 Units of Affordable Housing (1, 2 & 3 bedrooms)
- Daily Table grocery store
- FreshLo/ARTS Cultural Arts Education Center
- WellPower mental health services
- Office, retail and meeting spaces for businesses and nonprofits

== Notable people ==
Jon Platt, music executive, grew up in Montbello

Joy Reid, journalist and political commentator, spent part of childhood in Montbello

Javon Jackson, jazz musician, grew up in Montbello

== See also ==
- Bibliography of Colorado
- Geography of Colorado
- History of Colorado
- Index of Colorado-related articles
- List of Colorado-related lists
  - List of neighborhoods in Denver
  - List of populated places in Colorado
- Outline of Colorado
