= List of neighborhoods in Denver =

Coordinates: 39.7392°N 104.9849°W

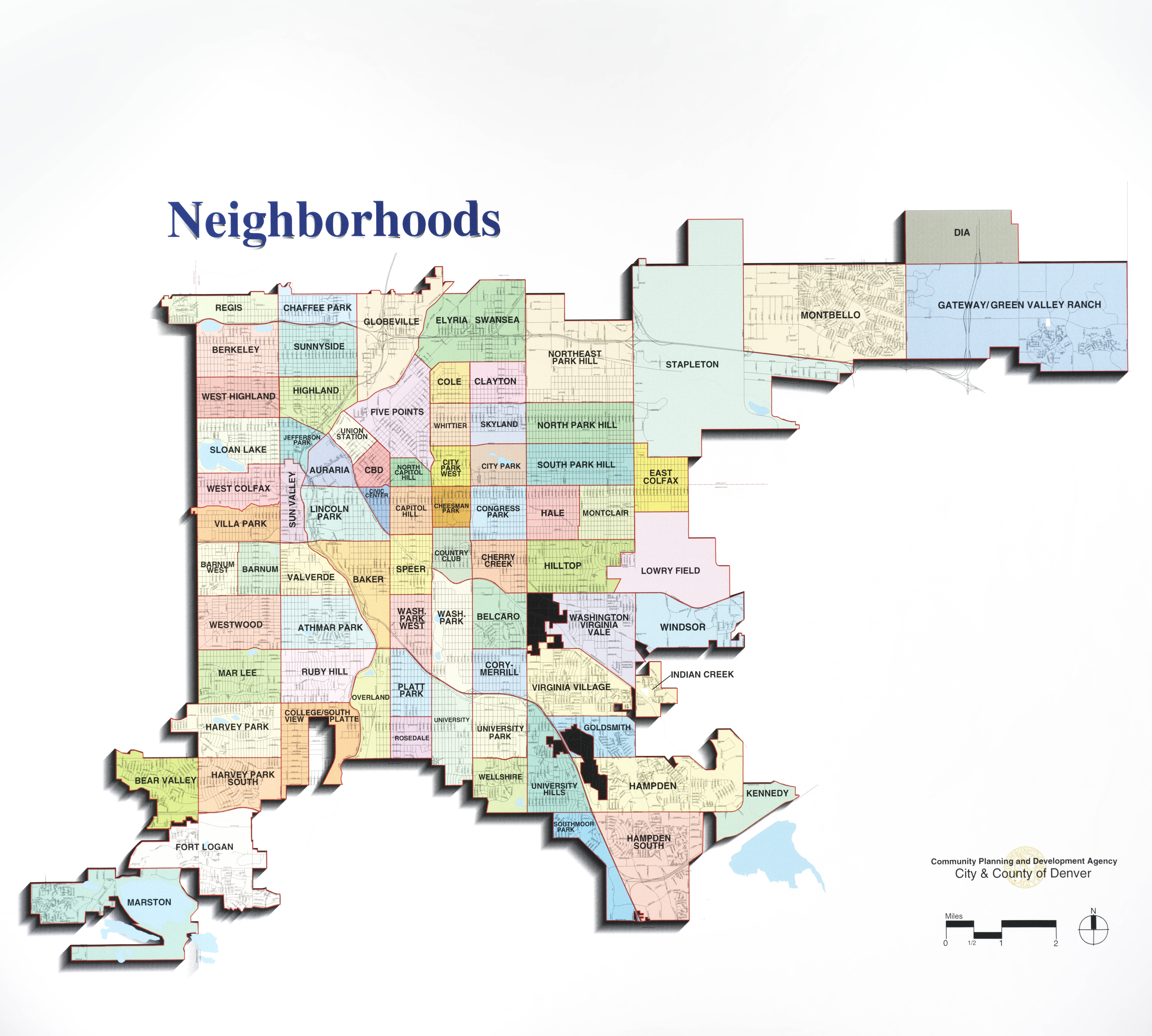
The 78 official neighborhoods of the City and County of Denver.

The City and County of Denver, capital of the U.S. state of Colorado, has 78 official neighborhoods used for planning and administration. The system of neighborhood boundaries and names dates to 1970 when city planners divided the city into 73 groups of one to four census tracts, called "statistical neighborhoods," most of which are unchanged since then.

Unlike some other cities, such as Chicago, Denver does not have official larger area designations. Colloquially, names such as Northside and Westside are still in use, but not well-known. Since 2016, Community planners have used a set of 19 planning areas, all of which are groups of statistical neighborhoods, as part of the Area Planning process.

== Central ==
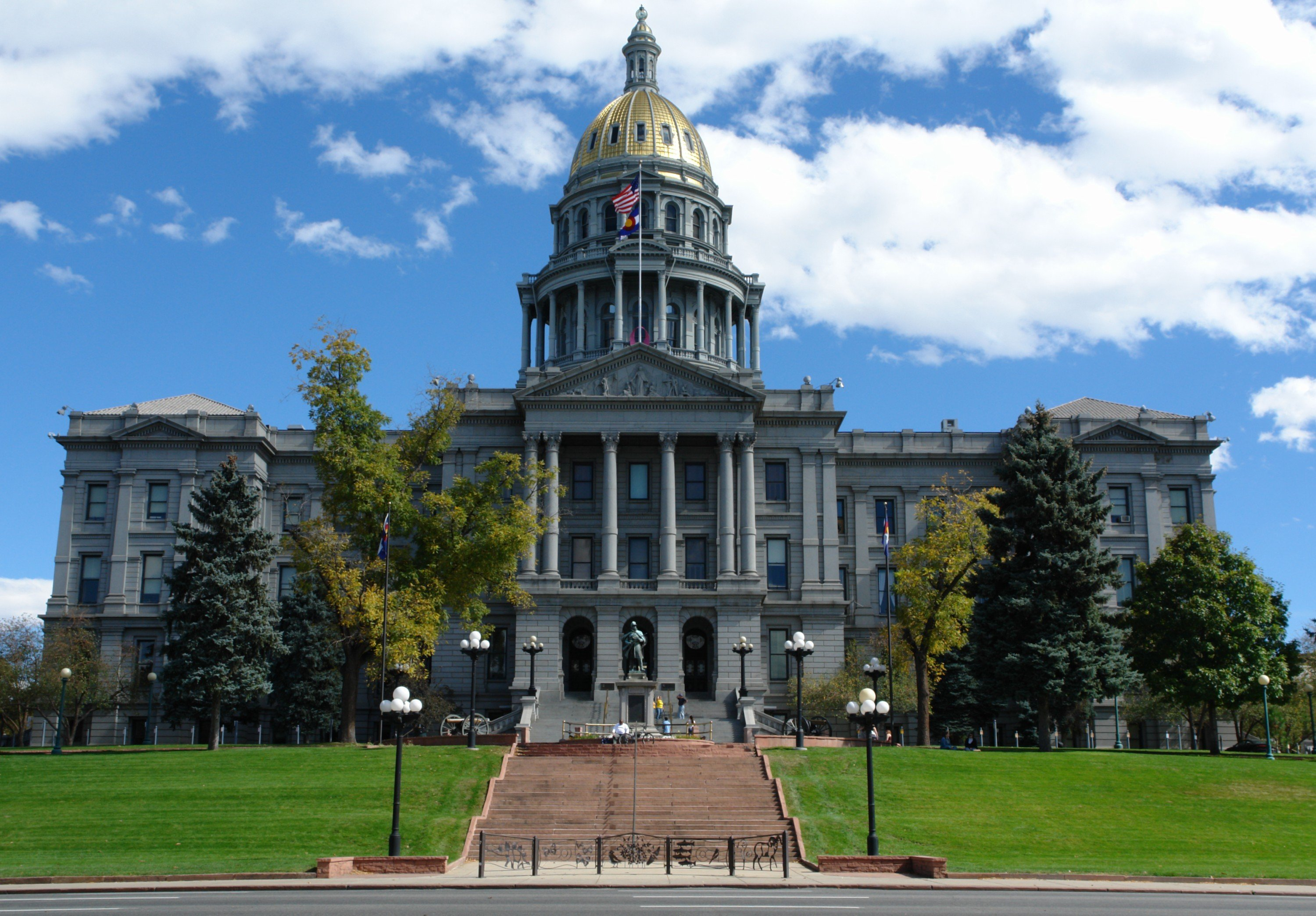
Colorado State Capitol Building, at the western edge of the Capitol Hill neighborhood

- Baker
- Capitol Hill
- Central Business District
- Cheesman Park
- Cherry Creek
- City Park
- City Park West
- Civic Center
- Congress Park
- Country Club
- Lincoln Park
- North Capitol Hill
- Speer
- Union Station

== East ==
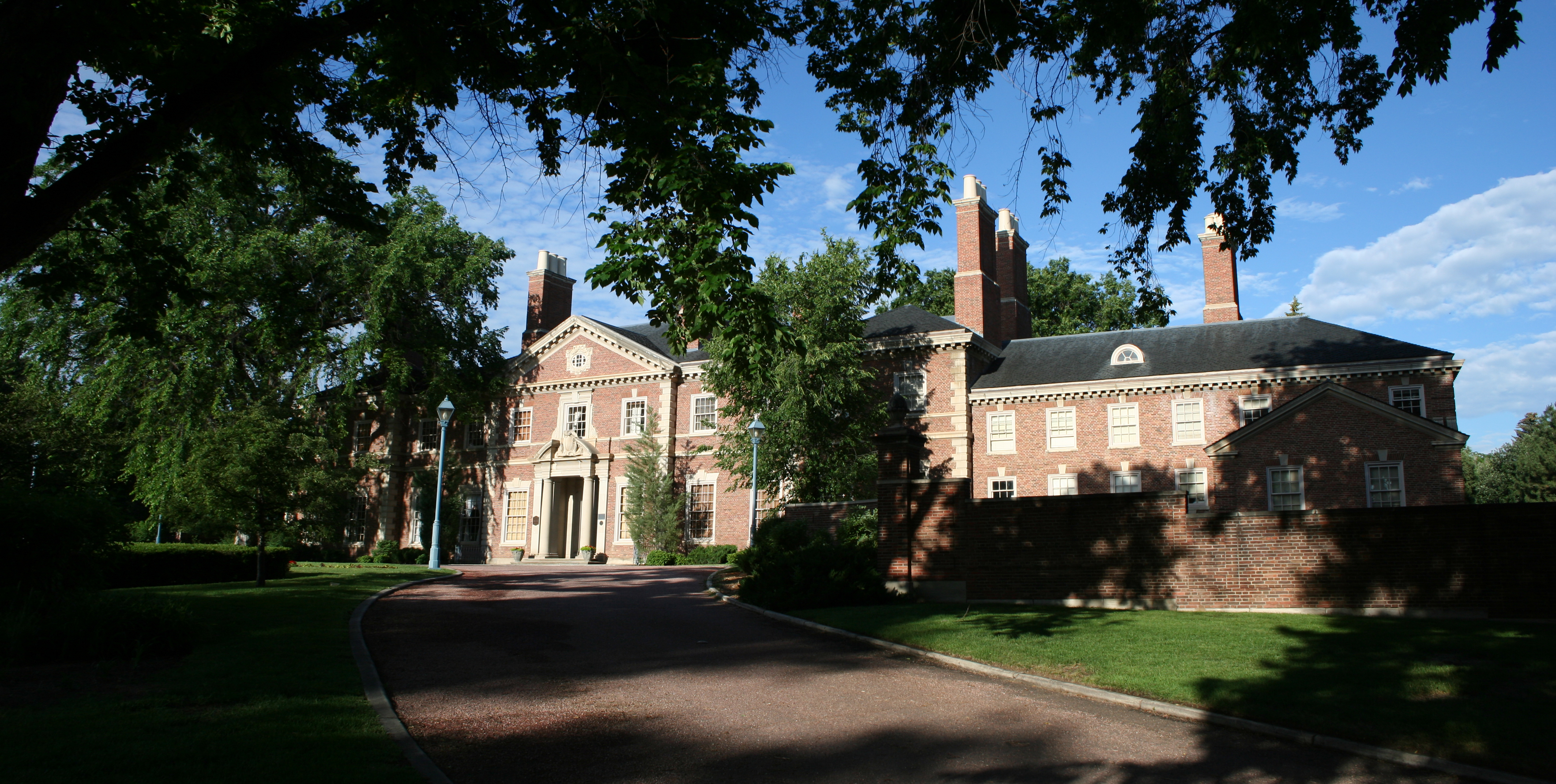
The Phipps Mansion in the Belcaro neighborhood.

- Belcaro
- Cory-Merrill
- East Colfax
- Hale
- Hilltop
- Indian Creek
- Lowry
- Montclair
- Park Hill
- Virginia Village
- Washington Virginia Vale
- Windsor

== North ==
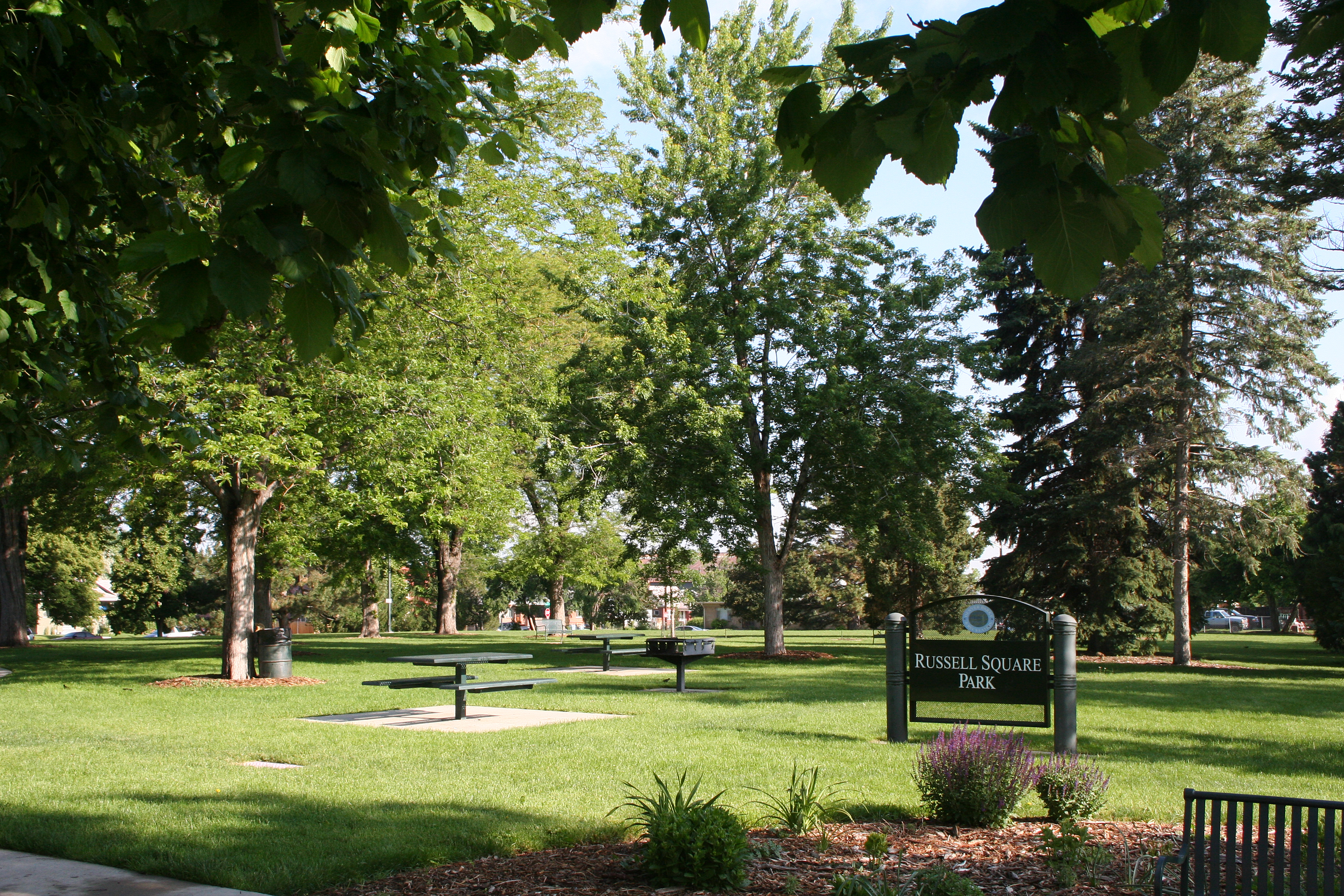
Russell Square Park in the Cole Neighborhood.

- Clayton
- Cole
- Elyria-Swansea
- Five Points
- Globeville
- North Park Hill
- Skyland
- South Park Hill
- Whittier

== Northeast ==
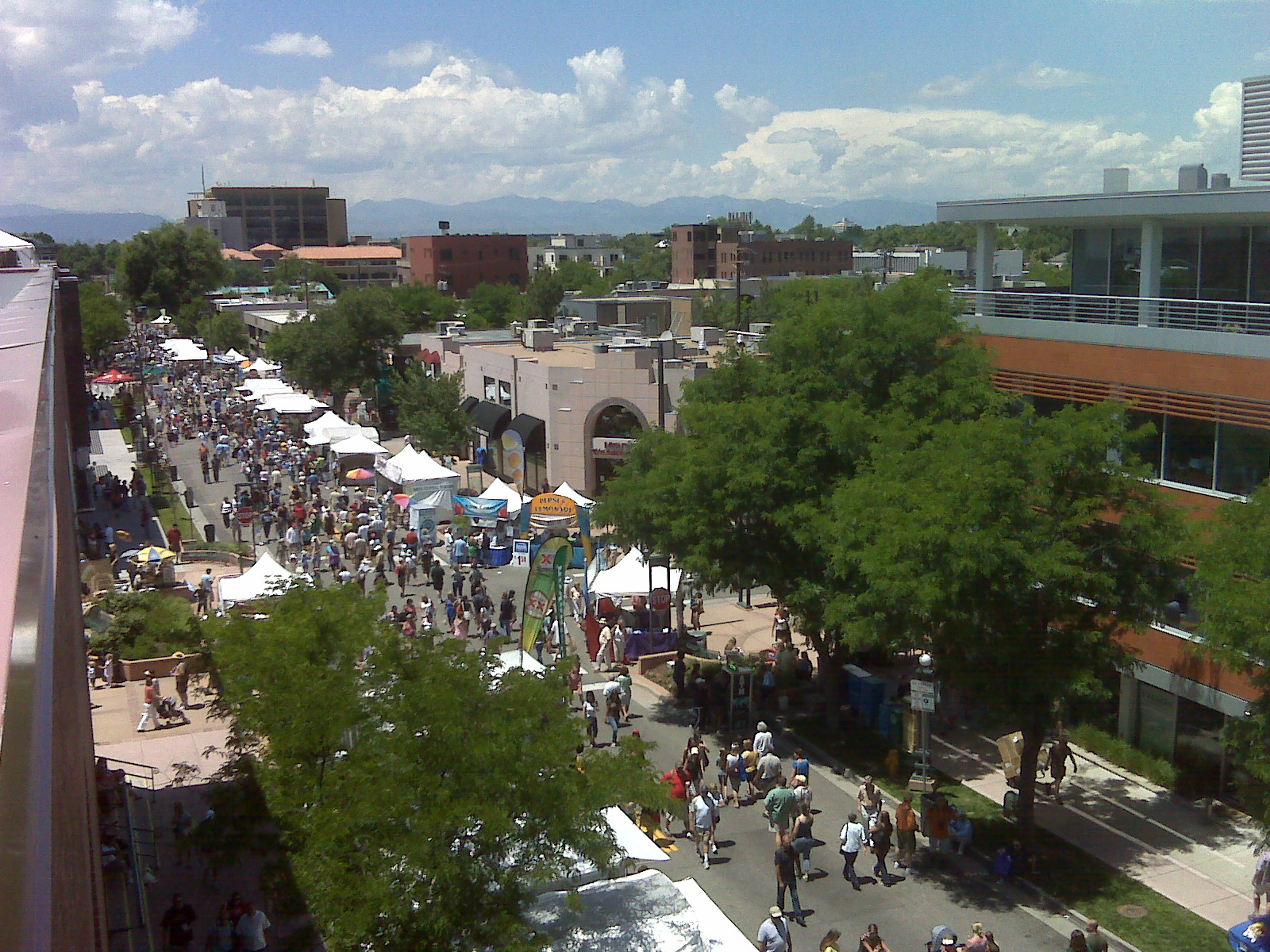
July 4th Arts Festival in the Cherry Creek commercial district

- Central Park
- Denver International Airport
- Gateway/Green Valley Ranch
- Montbello
- Northeast Park Hill

== Northwest ==
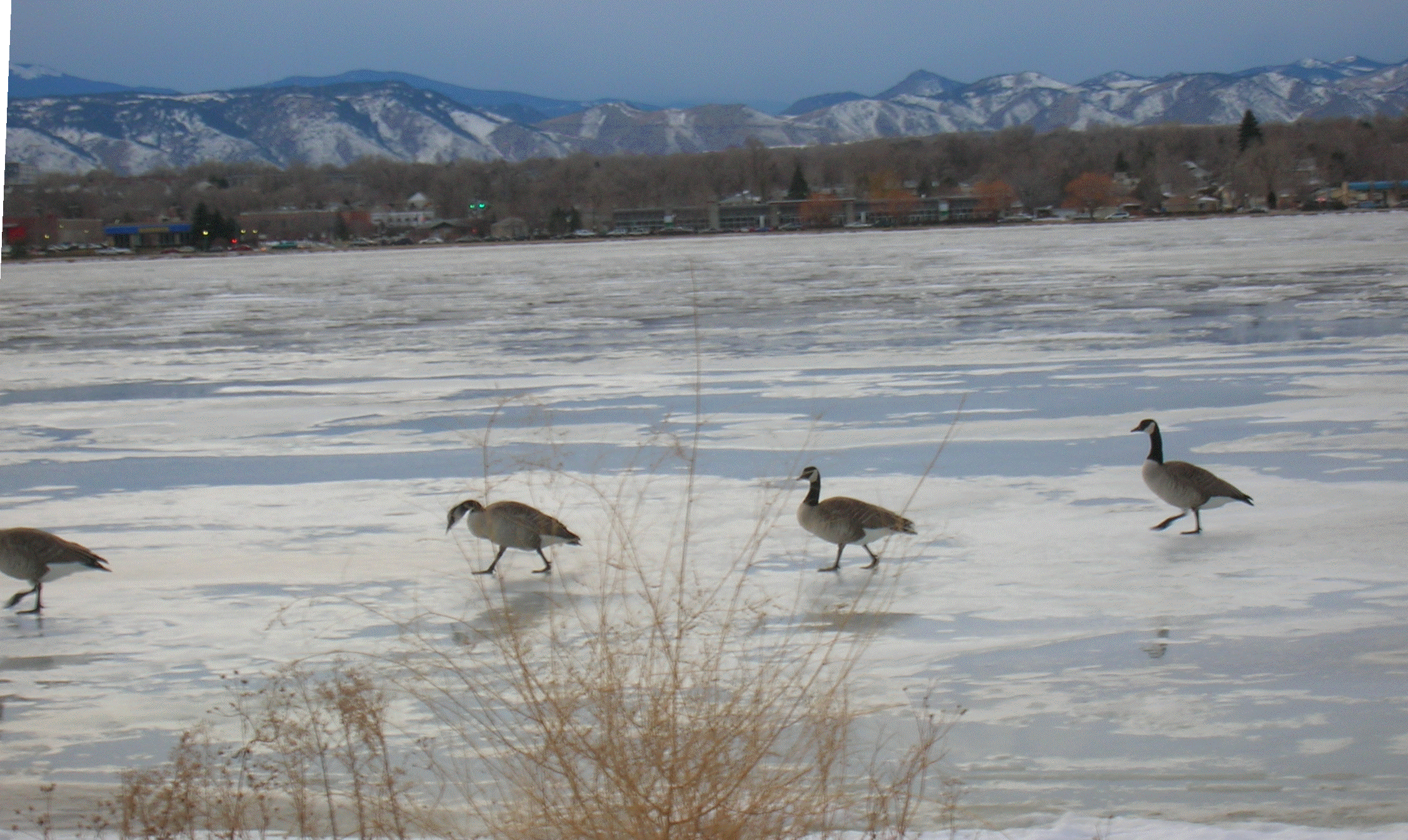
A flock of Canada geese on the frozen surface of Sloan's Lake in winter. Rocky Mountains are in the background.

- Auraria
- Berkeley
- Chaffee Park
- Highland
- Jefferson Park
- Regis
- Sloan Lake
- Sunnyside
- West Highland

== South ==
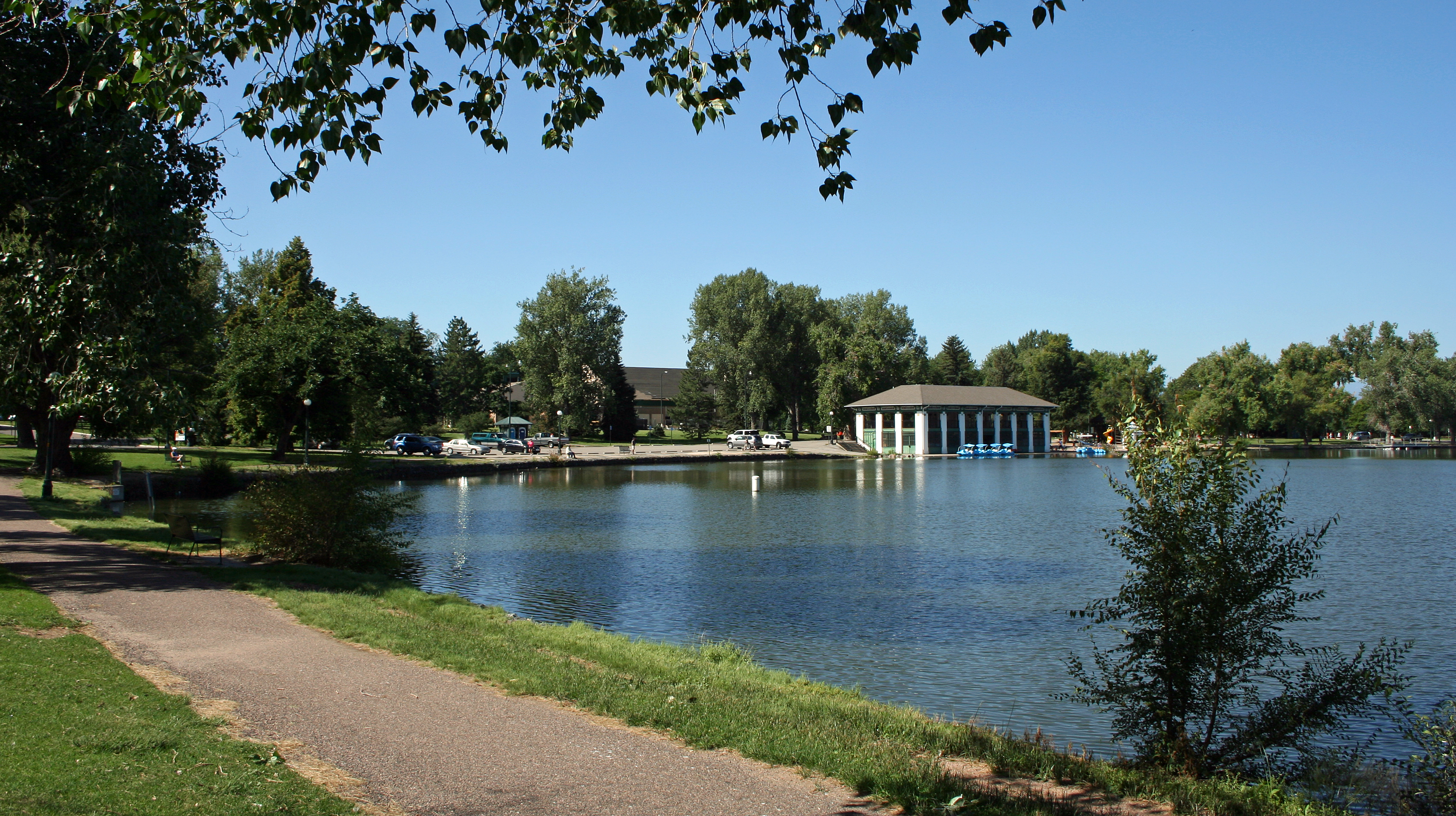
Washington Park

- College View/South Platte
- Overland
- Platt Park
- Rosedale
- University
- University Hills
- University Park
- Washington Park
- Washington Park West
- Wellshire

== Southeast ==
- Goldsmith
- Hampden
- Hampden South
- Kennedy
- Southmoor Park

== Southwest ==
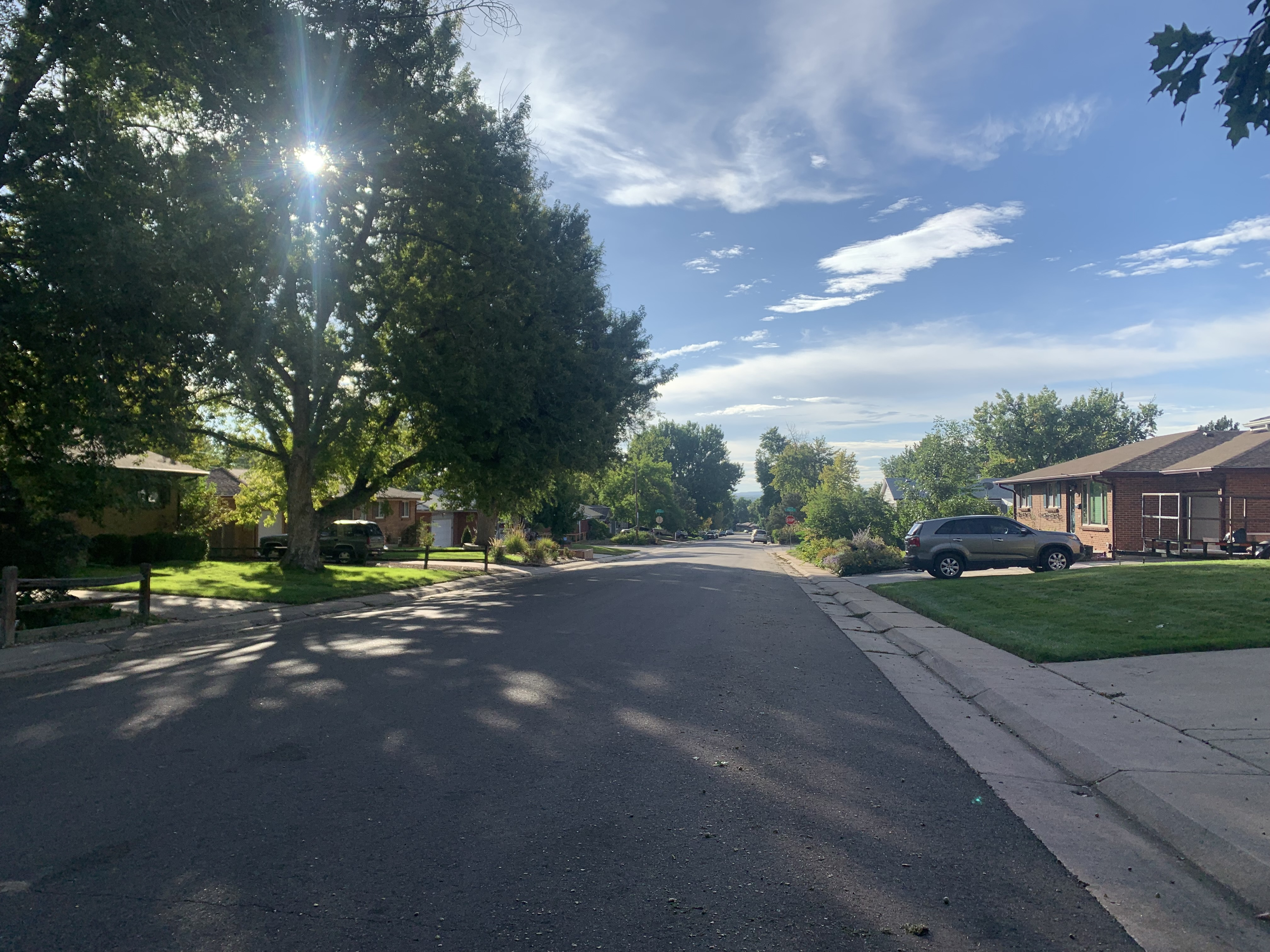
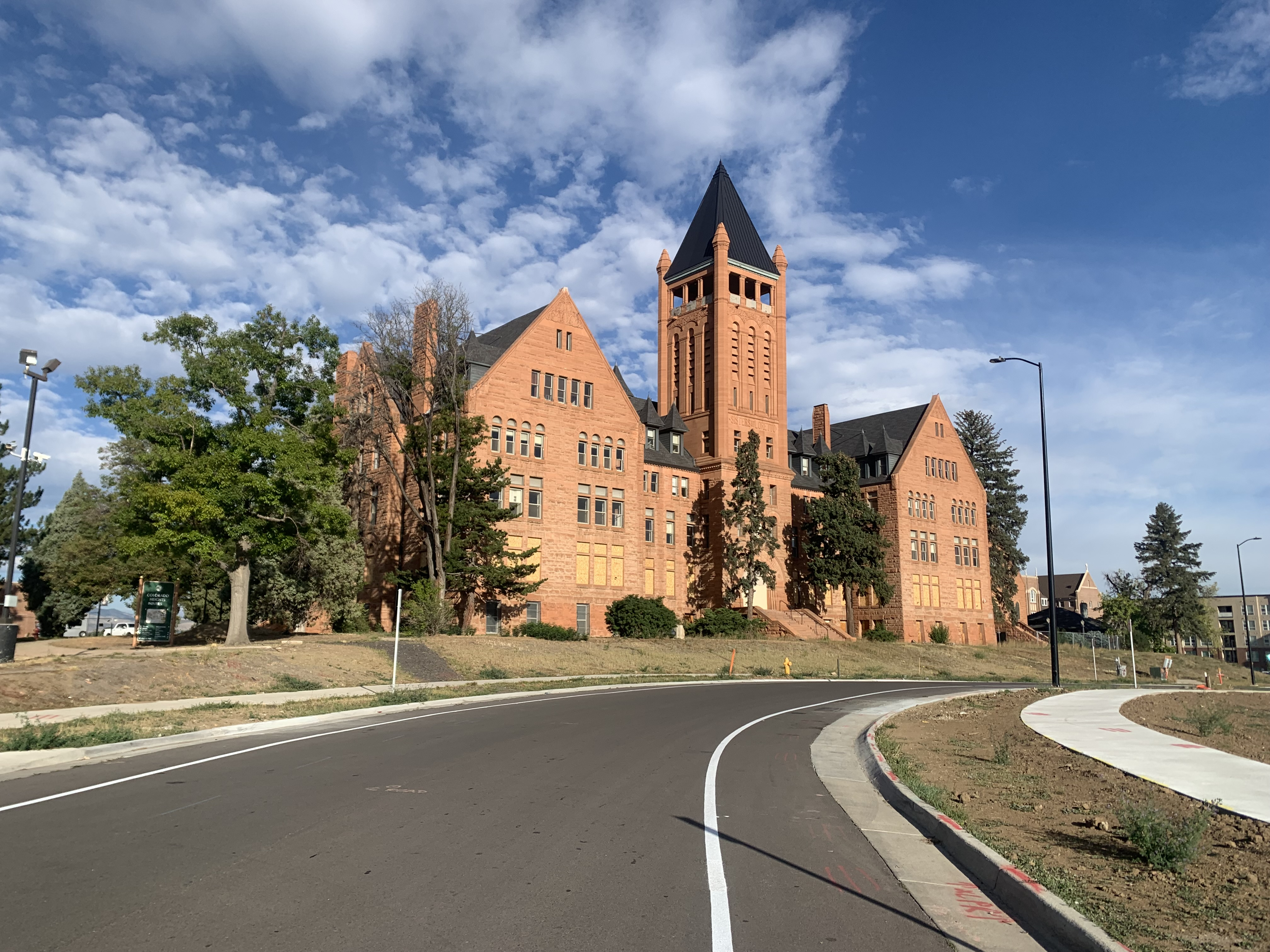
Residential street in Fort Logan and Loretto Heights College building in Harvey Park South.
- Bear Valley
- Fort Logan
- Harvey Park
- Harvey Park South
- Marston

== West ==
- Athmar Park
- Barnum
- Barnum West
- Mar Lee
- Ruby Hill
- Sun Valley
- Valverde
- Villa Park
- West Colfax
- Westwood

== Non-official neighborhoods ==
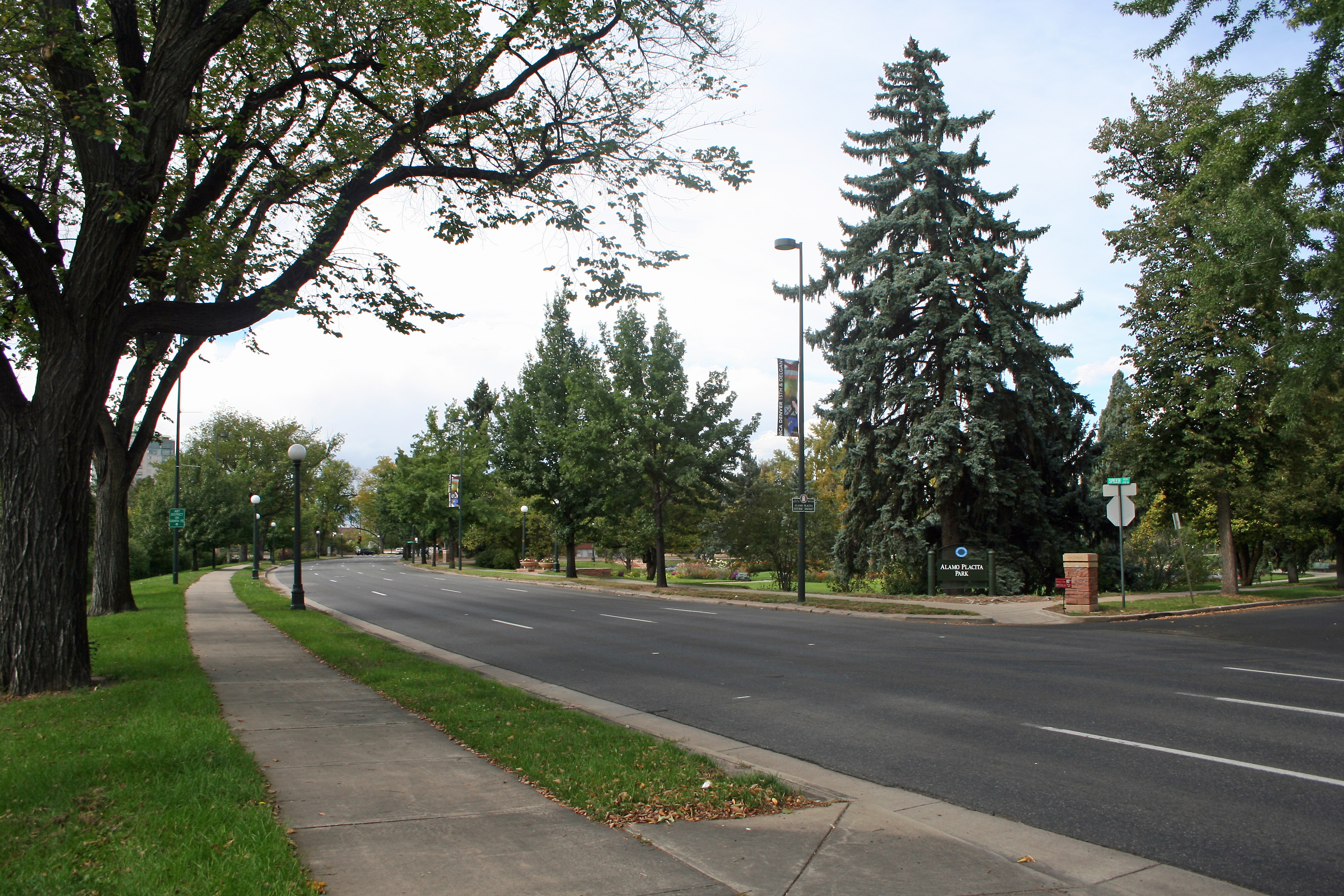
The Alamo Placita neighborhood is named for Alamo Placita Park. The street in the foreground is the northbound part of Speer Boulevard.

- Alamo Placita – the part of the Speer neighborhood north of Speer Blvd., and encompassing the Alamo Placita Historic district and parts of two other Denver historic districts
- Ballpark District – an area that includes Coors Field and several blocks east, part of the Five Points neighborhood, and overlaps with RiNo
- Burns Brentwood – a subdivision in southwest Denver, eastern portion of Harvey Park neighborhood
- Crestmoor – an area near Crestmoor Park in the Hilltop neighborhood
- Curtis Park – a portion of the Five Points neighborhood
- Golden Triangle – an area incorporating many of Denver's civic and cultural institutions, closely corresponds with the Civic Center neighborhood
- Hampden Heights
- LoDo – "Lower Downtown," the original settlement of Denver, with many of its oldest buildings, overlapping parts of the Union Station and Five Points neighborhoods
- LoHi – "Lower Highland," the eastern portion of the Highland neighborhood
- Mayfair
- Parkfield
- RiNo – "River North," part of the Five Points neighborhood
- Northside – a large area of northwest Denver
- South Denver – an area encompassing several neighborhoods south of Alameda Blvd., and the name of municipality annexed into Denver in 1894
- Uptown – an area roughly corresponding with North Capitol Hill neighborhood

== Registered Neighborhood Organizations ==
In 1979 a Denver ordinance created the Registered Neighborhood Organization system intended to improve resident access to city government. Registered Neighborhood Organizations (RNOs) define their own boundaries and must be open to all residents and property owners within those boundaries. Denver requires RNOs to re-register annually, so the complete list is subject to change; as of 2024, 180 RNOs are included in the city's catalog. RNOs often correspond closely to official neighborhood names and boundaries, however names or boundaries may also derive from non-official neighborhoods, community or business interests, or colloquial usage. A few RNOs encompass large areas, and many RNOs overlap.

== See also ==
- Bibliography of Colorado
- Geography of Colorado
- History of Colorado
- Index of Colorado-related articles
- List of Colorado-related lists
- Outline of Colorado
