= Hampden South, Denver =

Neighborhood in Denver, CO

Coordinates: 39.6446°N 104.8999°W

Hampden South is a neighborhood in Denver, Colorado, United States.

== History and development ==
Much of the land was acquired in the 1860s by homesteader Rufus Clark, who amassed his fortune growing and selling potatoes to the influx of miners looking to make fortunes in the regional gold rush. The neighborhood was annexed by the City of Denver in the 1960s and subsequently developed into a suburban neighborhood.

Today the neighborhood consists largely of 1960s-1970s era homes on some of the larger lots found in the city. The neighborhood also has three large parks – Southmoor, Rosamond, and Eastmoor – and nearby Cherry Creek State Park extends just to the east.

== Demographics ==
As of 2017, its population was 15,603 and had a median individual income of $41,650.

== Businesses ==
Sumitomo Corporation operates its Denver office in Suite 720 at 8055 East Tufts Avenue.

== See also ==
- Bibliography of Colorado
- Geography of Colorado
- History of Colorado
- Index of Colorado-related articles
- List of Colorado-related lists
  - List of neighborhoods in Denver
  - List of populated places in Colorado
- Outline of Colorado
