= Harvey Park, Denver =

Neighborhood in Denver, Colorado, United States of America

Coordinates: 39.6772°N 105.0401°W

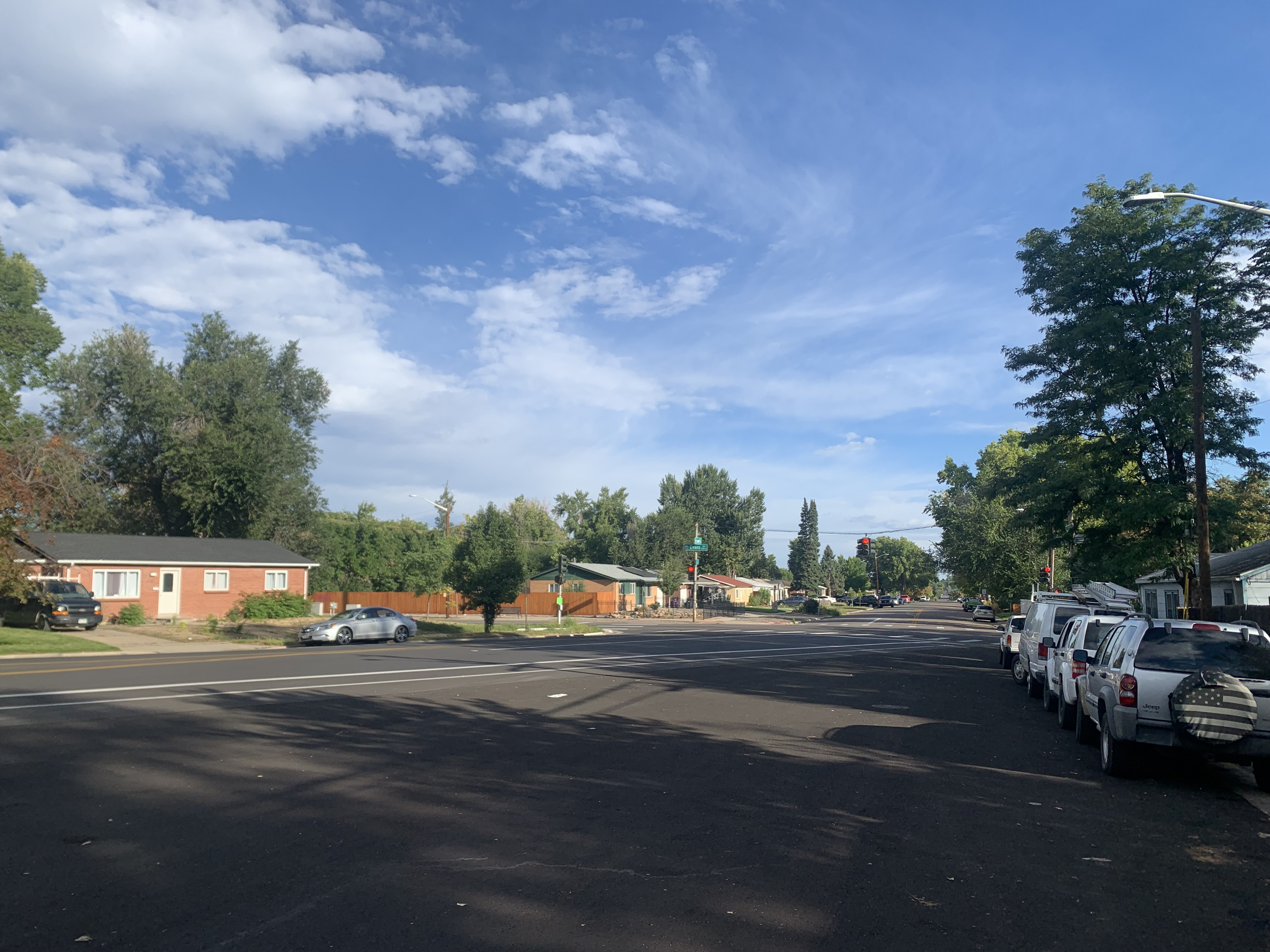
Residential street in Harvey Park neighborhood of Denver, Colorado.

Harvey Park is a neighborhood in Denver, Colorado. As of the 2020 U.S. Census, the population of the neighborhood was 11,496.

== Geography ==
Harvey Park is a neighborhood as defined by the City and County of Denver. There are a number of conflicting maps of the neighborhood. However, the city's Community and Development department lists the official boundaries as follows.

=== East of South Sheridan Boulevard ===
- North – Jewell Avenue
- West – South Sheridan Boulevard
- East – South Lowell Boulevard
- South – Yale Avenue

=== West of South Sheridan Boulevard ===
- North – Jewell Avenue; West Green Meadows Place
- West – South Depew Street; South Harlan Street
- East – South Sheridan Boulevard
- South – West Warren Avenue

There are three lakes in Harvey Park:

- Harvey Park Lake
- Riviera Lake
- Wolcott Lake

The similarly named neighborhood Harvey Park South borders Harvey Park directly to the south.

== History ==
The 160 acres that makes up present-day was part of “Whiteman’s Black and White Ranch,” owned by jazz musician Paul Whiteman. In 1948, American businessman Arthur Harvey purchased the land, along with 320 acres of Arapahoe County, Colorado. In March 1953, homeowners in Harvey Park petitioned the city of Denver for annexation, and the neighborhood was officially annexed in March 1954. The firm C. Burns Realty & Trust constructed a model village of three homes in November 1954 at the intersection of Harvard Avenue and Lowell Boulevard. The builders of the neighborhood were Lou Carey, K.C. Ensor, and Thomas Hutchison. Nearly 4,000 homes were built in Harvey Park between 1954 and 1957.

== Architecture ==
The Harvey Park Neighborhood is primarily residential, with single-family homes built mostly in a Mid-century modern architectural style. There are homes built by noteworthy architects of the period, such as Cliff May and Chris Choate. In Harvey Park, there are 170 homes built by Cliff May alone. The majority of homes in Harvey Park were built between 1954 and 1965. In 2016, Historic Denver piloted its Discover Denver program, a survey of the city's historic homes. The organization later listed the Cliff May homes on its "50 Actions for 50 Places" list for historic preservation.

== Schools ==
- Doull Elementary School (opened 1956)
- Kunsmiller Creative Arts Academy
- Notre Dame Catholic School

== Registered Neighborhood Organization (RNO) ==
The RNO for the Harvey Park Neighborhood is the Harvey Park Community Organization (HPCO) — formerly known as the Harvey Park Improvement Association (HPIA).

== See also ==
- Bibliography of Colorado
- Geography of Colorado
- History of Colorado
- Index of Colorado-related articles
- List of Colorado-related lists
  - List of neighborhoods in Denver
  - List of populated places in Colorado
- Outline of Colorado
