= Virginia Village, Denver =

Neighborhood of Denver, Colorado

Coordinates: 39.6854°N 104.9242°W

Virginia Village is a neighborhood of Denver, Colorado, roughly five miles southeast of downtown. The neighborhood consists of a mixture of town homes, single-family homes, shopping plazas, and mid to high-rise apartment and office buildings. It is served by the Colorado Station on the E, F, and H RTD light rail lines. The neighborhood is bounded on the west by Colorado Boulevard; on the southwest by Interstate 25; on the south by Evans Avenue; on the east by Quebec Street; on the northeast by Cherry Creek; and on the north by Mississippi Avenue. Holly Street divides the Virginia Village neighborhood into two areas, each represented by a neighborhood association. The area west of Holly Street comprises the Virginia Village Ellis Community Association, while the area to the east of Holly comprises the Cook Park Neighborhood Association.

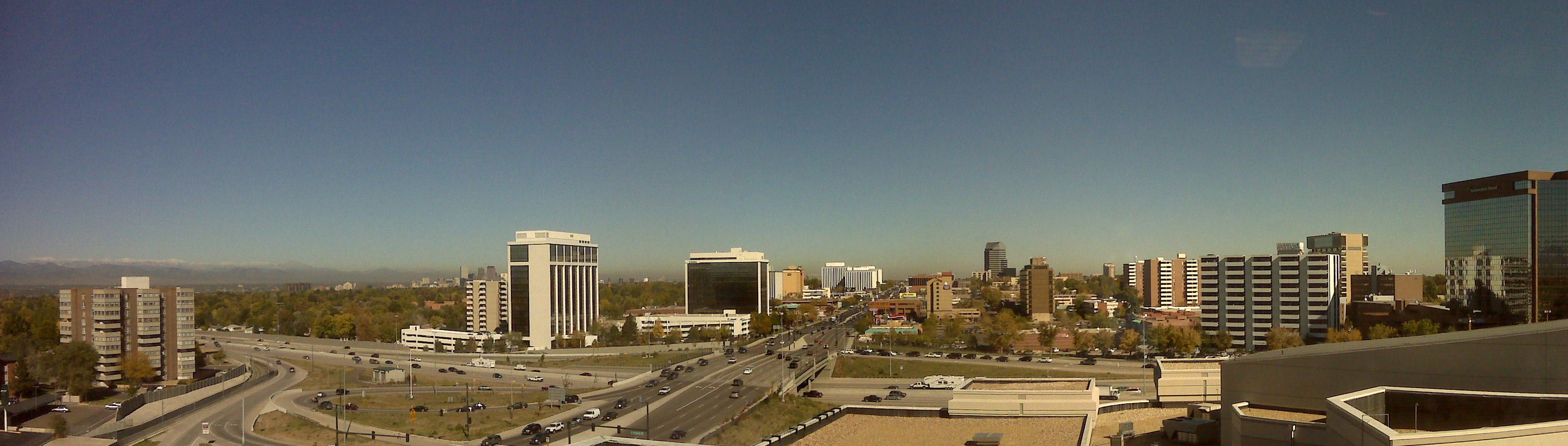
Virginia Village Skyline

== See also ==
- Bibliography of Colorado
- Geography of Colorado
- History of Colorado
- Index of Colorado-related articles
- List of Colorado-related lists
  - List of neighborhoods in Denver
  - List of populated places in Colorado
- Outline of Colorado
