= Arthur Harvey =

American businessman (1895–1976)

- Born: September 26, 1895; Edom, Texas
- Died: March 22, 1976 (aged 80); Corpus Christi, Texas
- Burial place: Denver, Colorado

Arthur Harvey (September 26, 1895 – March 22, 1976) was an American businessman best known as the namesake of the Harvey Park neighborhood of Denver.

== Early life and World War I ==
Harvey was born in Edom, Texas. At age 16 he left school to do manual labor and eventually enlisted in the Fifth Texas Infantry. He worked in the company office until he left for France in 1918 and was transferred to the Second Division of the Regular Army, where he was assigned to the 9th Infantry. Harvey was active from August 5, 1917, until August 18, 1919, receiving battle stars at St. Mihiel, Champagne, and Meuse-Argonne and exiting as a sergeant.

== The IRS and oil ==
After his discharge, Harvey returned to Rusk County and farmed for a year, but the failure of the crop forced him to sell the land. He became a railway postal clerk in 1920. From 1923 to 1926, Harvey worked as chief clerk in San Antonio, Texas, and in 1926 he began working for the Bureau of Internal Revenue Intelligence Unit, handling fraud investigations. In the course of auditing oil business, Harvey became well versed in the then new industry. He invested in a percentage of a 36-acre patch in the East Texas Oil Field. Many of his subsequent prospects failed, but notable successes included patches in the East Long Lake field in Anderson County, Texas, and the Spraberry Trend near Midland, Texas.

== World War II ==
Harvey volunteered for military service in World War II and was commissioned a captain in the Army Air Forces. As an intelligence officer for the 449th Bombardment Group, he served in Italy, France, Yugoslavia, and Romania. He retired as a major.

== Post-war life ==
In 1948 he purchased a 320-acre ranch in Arapahoe County, Colorado, and in 1950 purchased another 160 acres. After several failed ventures including a refrigerated storage business, Harvey was forced to sell most of the land to a private developer. A planned community of 1,662 homes called Harvey Park was created on the land around his remaining two acres. In 1962, Harvey sold his home and returned to Texas. He died on March 22, 1976, and was buried in Fort Logan National Cemetery in Denver, Colorado.
