= Southglenn, Colorado =

- neighborhood
- Location of Southglenn in Arapahoe County, Colorado.
- Coordinates: 39°35′14″N 104°57′10″W
- Country: United States
- State: Colorado
- County: Arapahoe County
- City: City of Centennial
- Elevation: 5,587 ft (1,703 m)

Population (2000)
  - Total: 43,520
- Time zone: UTC-7 (MST)
  - Summer (DST): UTC-6 (MDT)
- Area codes: 303/720/983
- GNIS feature: Southglenn, Colorado

Southglenn is a neighborhood in the City of Centennial, Colorado. A former census-designated place (CDP), the population was 43,520 at the 2000 census.

== History ==
Southglenn was built as a master planned community by Jordon Perlmutter. It has been a part of the City of Centennial since the city's incorporation in 2001.

== Geography ==
Southglenn is located at coordinates 39.587°N 104.953°W.

== Demographics ==
Historical population
Year	Pop.	±%
1970	22,899	—
1980	37,787	+65.0%
1990	43,087	+14.0%
2000	43,520	+1.0%
Source: United States Census Bureau

== See also ==
- Outline of Colorado
  - Index of Colorado-related articles
- State of Colorado
  - Colorado cities and towns
    - Centennial, Colorado
  - Colorado counties
    - Arapahoe County, Colorado
  - List of statistical areas in Colorado
    - Front Range Urban Corridor
    - North Central Colorado Urban Area
    - Denver-Aurora-Boulder, CO Combined Statistical Area
    - Denver-Aurora-Broomfield, CO Metropolitan Statistical Area
