= Jordon Perlmutter =

American real estate developer

- Born: 1931; Denver, Colorado, US
- Died: 2015 (age 84)
- Occupation: Real estate developer
- Spouse: Essie Lou Goldberg
- Children: Lisa Perlmutter, Jay Perlmutter, Vicki Perlmutter, Jonathan Perlmutter

Jordon Perlmutter (1931–2015) was an American real estate developer.

== Biography ==
Perlmutter was born to an Orthodox Jewish family in 1931, the son of Abe and Dora Perlmutter. His father was a general contractor and he was and was raised on the west side of Denver where he graduated from West High School. He attended the University of Denver on an athletic scholarship but was forced to cut his studies short to serve in the U.S. Coast Guard during the Korean War. After his service, Perlmutter and his cousin, Samuel Primack, constructed a single family home in Denver in 1952 on a lot that his father had given him and together founded Perl-Mack Enterprises. His brother-in-law, Bill Morrison, would later join the firm. Perl-Mack introduced the concept of planned communities to Denver with the 1959 construction of the 6,000 home Northglenn development, and later Montbello (1965) and Southglenn (now part of Centennial, Colorado). Perl-Mack Enterprises built over 22,000 single and multi-family homes throughout the Denver metropolitan area as well Northglenn Mall, Southglenn Mall, and Southwest Plaza. In 1983, Perl-Mack was dissolved and he went into business with his sons, Jay, and founded Jordon Perlmutter & Co. Later his son-in-law, Shell D. Cook, and son Jonathan would join the company.

== Philanthropy and boardships ==
In 2009, Perlmutter was inducted into the Colorado Business Hall of Fame for his contributions to the Colorado real estate community. He served as a trustee at the University of Denver from 1991 to 2006. He served on the board of directors on Shalom Cares, a Jewish not-for-profit nursing home and retirement community in Aurora that he had helped to build in 1992. Perlmutter has served on the boards of directors of the Rose Medical Center and the Anti-Defamation League Executive Committee.

== Personal life ==
In 1953, Perlmutter married Essie Lou Goldberg; they had four children: Jay Perlmutter; Jonathan Perlmutter; Lisa Perlmutter Cook; and Vicki Perlmutter Dansky. Services were held at the Hebrew Educational Alliance; he is buried at Rose Hill Cemetery. His nephew is U.S. congressman Ed Perlmutter.
