= Montbello High School =

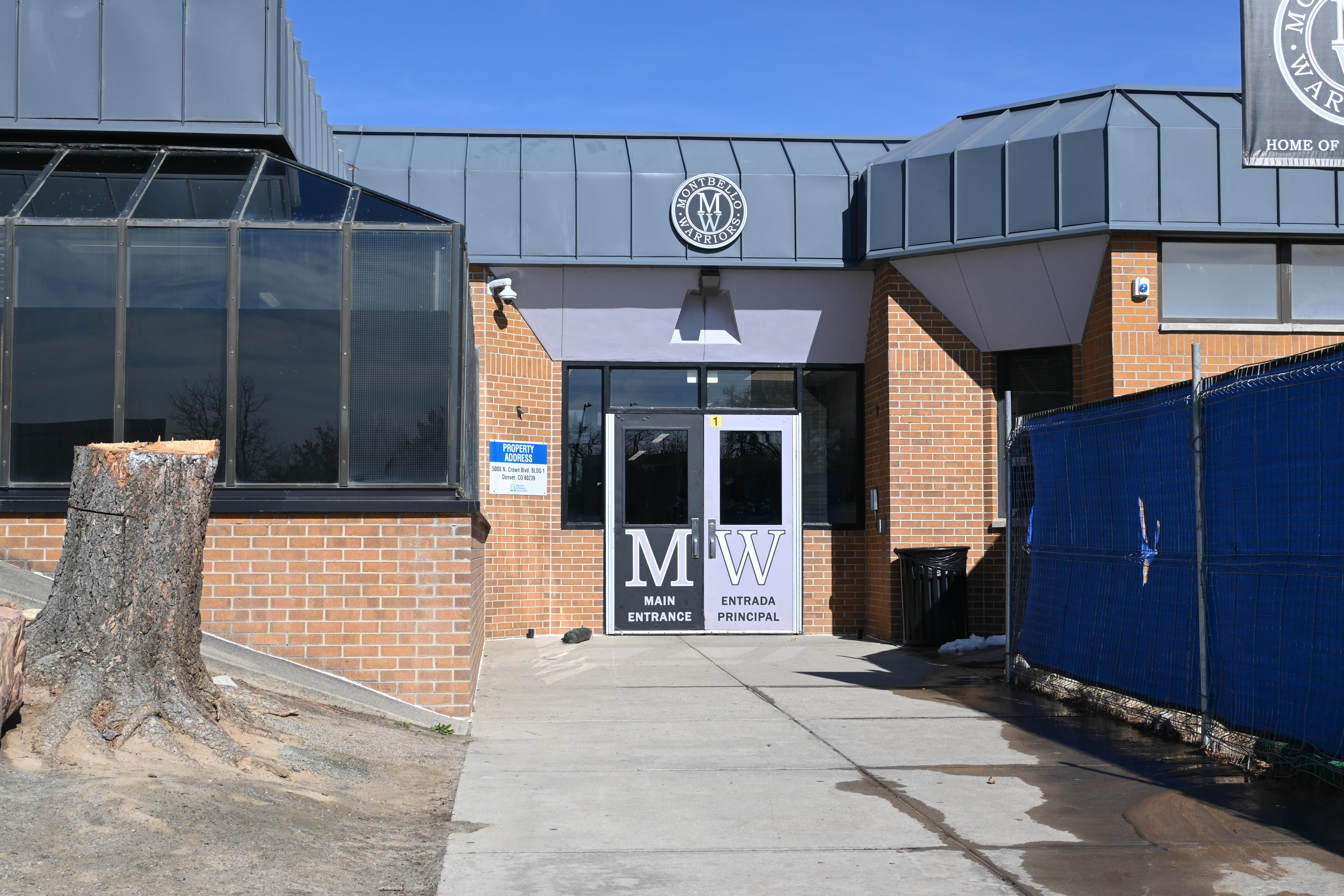
- Montbello High School main entrance

Location
- 5000 Crown Blvd. Denver, Colorado 80239-4329; United States
- 39°47′13″N 104°49′39″W

Information
- Type: Public
- School district: Denver Public Schools
- CEEB code: 060432
- Principal: Neisa Lynch
- Staff: 71.64 (FTE)
- Grades: 9–12
- Enrollment: 1,112 (2024–2025)
- Student to teacher ratio: 15.52
- Colors: Black and silver
- Athletics: 5A
- Athletics conference: Denver
- Mascot: Warrior
- Website: montbellohs.dpsk12.org

Montbello High School is a high school located in Denver, Colorado, United States in the Denver Public Schools system. It is located in the Montbello neighborhood on the northeast side of Denver.

The school opened in fall 1980, the first graduating class being the class of 1981. The school graduated its final class in 2014 before closing.

In 2020, the Denver Public Schools Board of Education committed to re-opening Montbello High School at its current campus, as well as creating a new feeder middle school. Both schools reopened in the 2022–2023 school year. The board formalized the next steps for unifying the existing school communities to reimagine them as a large comprehensive Montbello High School.

== Demographics ==
1,686 students were enrolled in the 2009–2010 school year. The student body's racial demographics were:

- 6% Caucasian
- 30.7% African American
- 60.9% Latino Swerve
- 0.4% Native American
- 2% Asian

Using federal government guidelines, 84.46% of the students were eligible for free or reduced-price lunches.
