= Athmar Park, Denver =

Neighborhood of Denver, Colorado, United States

Athmar Park
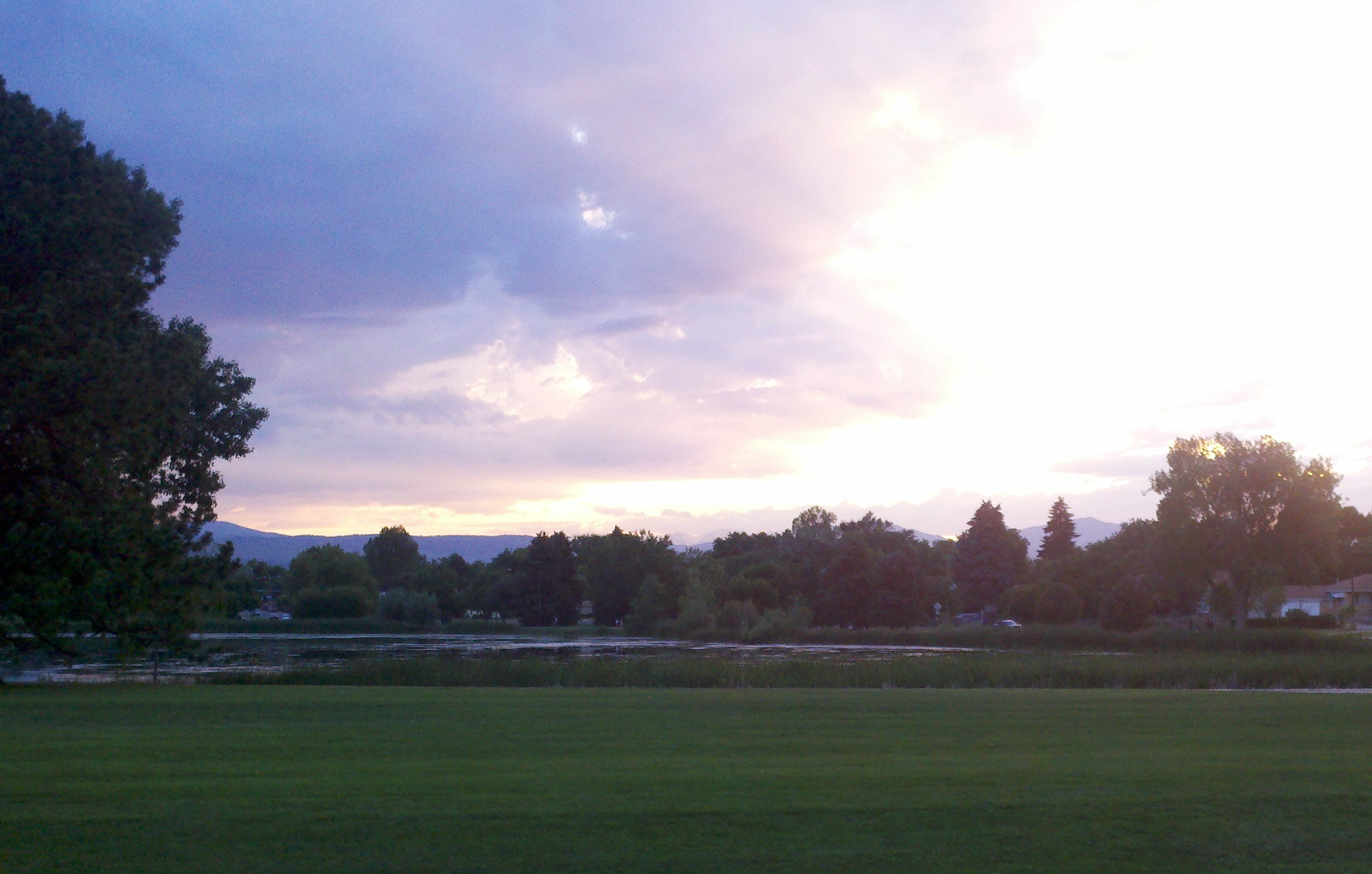
- Athmar Park on the east side of Huston Lake
- Interactive map of Athmar Park
- Coordinates: 39.7040°N 105.0110°W
- Country: United States
- State: Colorado
- City and County: Denver
- Established: 1946

Population (2010)
  - Total: 8,898
- Website: www.athmarpark.com

Athmar Park is a residential neighborhood in southwest Denver, Colorado. It consists mostly of all-brick ranches and bungalow-style homes built in the 1940s and 1950s.

== Geography ==
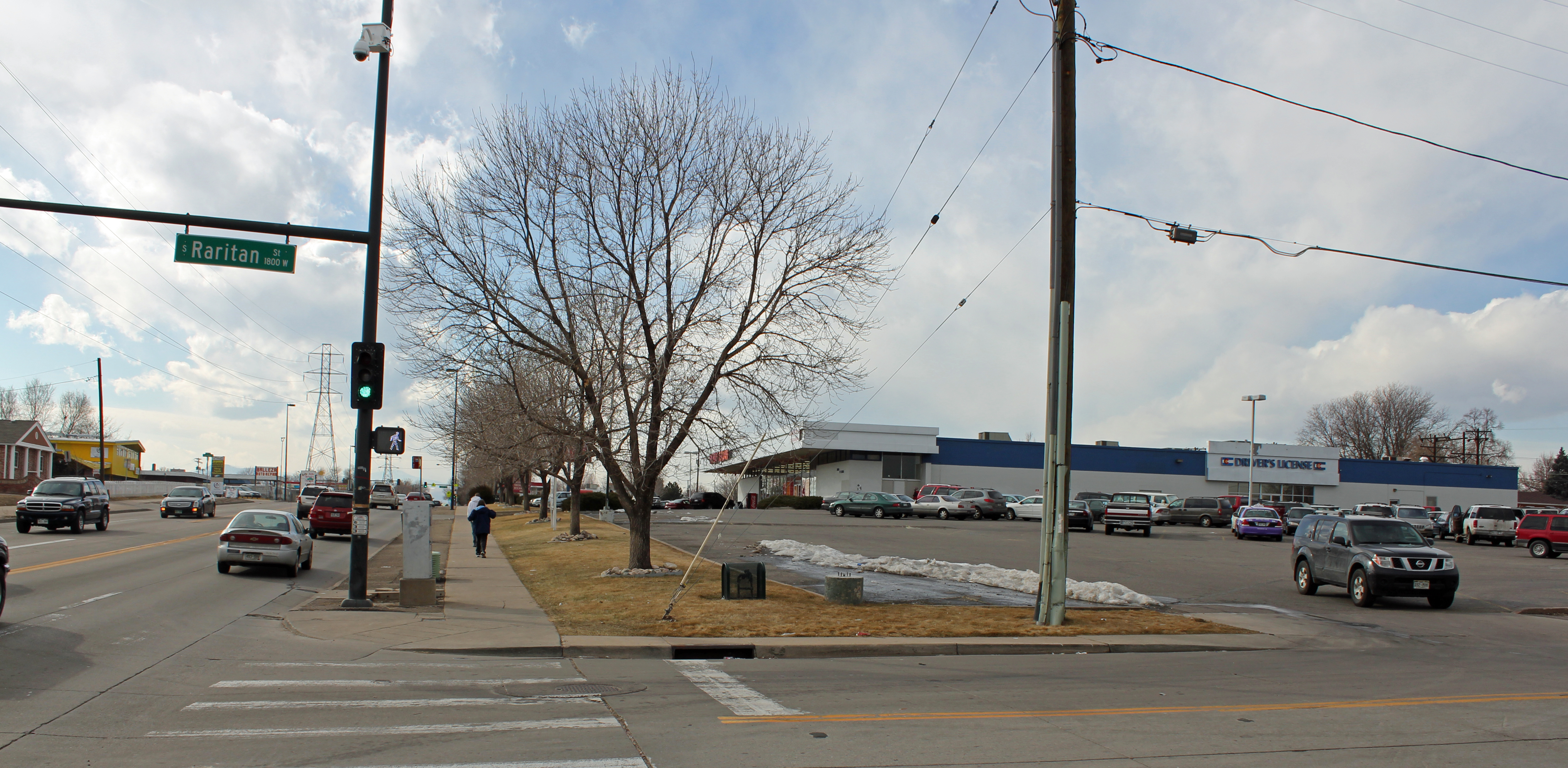
Mississippi Avenue at left marks the southern border of the neighborhood. At right is one of the Colorado driver's license offices.

Athmar Park is bordered by Alameda Avenue on the north, Mississippi Avenue on the south, Federal Boulevard on the west and the South Platte River on the east. Four Denver parks, Aspgren, Huston Lake, Vanderbilt Park and Habitat Park are within the boundaries of Athmar Park. The eastern half of the neighborhood is lower in elevation than the west, with a sharp rise above the river beginning near Pecos Street and continuing the gradual climb in elevation toward the southwest. In contrast to the older grid-type streets found in many neighborhoods, Athmar Park has some streets that have long, flowing curves.

One of Colorado's busiest driver's license offices is located in the neighborhood at 1865-C West Mississippi Avenue.

== Demographics ==
In 2000, the racial breakdown of Athmar Park was 29.52% White, 0.84% African American, 0.43% Native American, 3.15% Asian, and 65.21% Hispanic or Latino.

The publication of the 2010 United States Census, with a total population of 8,898, showed small changes in race and ethnicity with the population at 63% White or Hispanic/Latino, with 73% of that number claiming Hispanic ethnicity and 27% listing non-Hispanic ethnicity. Residents with Asian (3.5%), American Native (2.1%) and African American ethnicity (1.4%) make the remainder of the non-Hispanic population with 30% of them considering themselves "other" or "mixed".

== Parks ==
=== Huston Lake Park ===
Huston Lake Park is located in the center of the Athmar Park neighborhood between the streets of South Clay and South Vallejo, and the avenues of West Ohio and West Kentucky. With a variety of amenities including a bike and walking path, soccer and softball fields, tennis and basketball courts, and a children's play area, Huston Lake park provides many recreational resources for the local community. Named after one of the original land owners in the area, Nathaniel K. Huston, the park was originally the site of a patch of swampland called "Frenchie's Lake" which was used by early residents as a location to ice skate in the winter and swim in the summer.

=== Clifford Aspgren Park ===
Located at the eastern edge of the residential areas of Athmar Park, Clifford Aspgren park was named after a resident who served in the Colorado House of Representatives.

=== Vanderbilt Lake Park ===
Vanderbilt Lake Park contains both Habitat Park and Boy Scout Park and is part of the larger South Platte River Greenway. It contains a sports fields complex and is part of a series of parks connected by the South Platte River biking and walking trail system. Until 2011, Habitat Park was the location of the Denver Municipal Animal shelter, which moved to a site in the Valverde neighborhood to the north of Athmar Park.

== History ==
Historically, Athmar Park was annexed incrementally by the City of Denver. In 1902, the eastern edge of Athmar Park was annexed, along with the town of Valverde, from Zuni to the South Platte River border. In 1943, the area west of Zuni was annexed by the City of Denver. Known as Mountain View Park, it totaled 240 acres and was the first large scale annexation the city had made since 1902. The area west of the town of Valverde, that had originally been in the hands of three different owners, was auctioned and purchased by Thomas and John R. McCusker in 1946. In 1949 and 1950, developer Raymond Erb completed three subdivision plats he named "Athmar Park". According to urban legend, the name "Athmar" originated from the combination of the names of the developers' two wives, Athena and Mary. While subsequent oral histories undertaken with the descendants of Raymond Erb and other local developers of the time confirm a connection to Margaret Erb (Raymond's wife), which lends support to the "mar" part of the name, no connection could be confirmed with any other name that could corroborate the "ath" portion of the name. The developer did name a street for himself. Erb Place is located between South Osage and South Lipan streets, just north of West Kentucky Avenue.

In 1900, the northeast area of the neighborhood was rural and contained celery farms and wheat fields. Several of the original brick country homes still exist on W. Nevada Place, dating from the late 1880s to the early 1900s. 1395 W. Nevada Place dates to the late 1880s, and 1597 W. Nevada Place dates to 1912.

Many of the charming brick bungalows in the Mountain View Park area in the northwest section of the neighborhood have a unique design and date from the 1920s and 1930s when the area was still part of unincorporated Arapahoe County.

After World War II, there was a major housing boom during which a large number of the neighborhood "tract" homes were built.

One of Denver's first McDonald's restaurants was located in the neighborhood, at 2120 W. Alameda Avenue. The building is still there but hosts a different restaurant.

The neighborhood was affected by a destructive flood in June 1965 when the S. Platte River flooded outside its banks. Flood waters reached up to the basketball hoops at St. Rose of Lima Catholic Church school (1345 W. Dakota Ave.). Flood waters engulfed homes and businesses from the river all the way west into the 1400 blocks of the neighborhood. "The flooding along the South Platte River from Plum Creek to North Platte, Nebraska was the most destructive. The flood reached the South Platte River and the metropolitan areas of Denver by about 8 p.m. on June 16. The floodwaters spread to a half-mile or more in width. The peak discharge of the South Platte at Denver was 183 percent of the previous maximum during 67 years of record and historical information indicates that the 1965 discharge was the greatest since at least 1844. Many business, homes, industries, roads and highways were inundated. About 8,000 telephones were put out of service by the flood in the Denver area. More than half of these lines were not restored for several days.

The Denver metropolitan area suffered extensive damage. The flood zone represented 67 percent of the industrial area in the city. While the flood passed rather quickly on the night of June 16, the floodwaters were piled high with debris such as house trailers, lumber and large butane storage tanks. Many of the bridges in the downtown area became plugged with debris and were washed out when they could no longer withstand the pressure. Other bridges held, but sustained excessive erosion damage. The floodwaters left behind several feet of mud and debris all along the South Platte flood plain. In Denver, the cleanup job took several months and cost the city over $1 million. Chatfield Reservoir was built in response to the 1965 flood.

Athmar Park is the site of a branch library. Until 1999, the library was housed in a small storefront in the Athmar Shopping Center (1865 W. Mississippi Avenue). In 1999, the library was relocated into a remodeled stone building, formerly a church, located at the corner of West Mississippi Avenue and South Tejon Street at 1055 South Tejon Street. The Athmar branch library has a Robert Mangold wind sculpture that was formerly located at the Denver Art Museum.

The neighborhood has six mosaic games tables created as a public art project by area residents and school children. The game tables are intended to provide gathering places and encourage interaction between area residents. Three mosaic game tables are located at Huston Lake Park and three in Aspgren Park. The game boards include chess, checkers and backgammon boards. They are surrounded by themed mosaics.

At Huston Lake there are:

A mosaic quilt patch table commemorates the ladies of the Valverde Presbyterian Church who gathered every Tuesday for over 40 years to create quilts for the less fortunate
A mosaic flower table created by Valverde Elementary school children
A mosaic view of the mountains from Huston Lake created by neighborhood residents. The well-known Colorado oil painter and neighborhood resident, Brenda Hendrix, created the overall design of the mountain view table

At Aspgren Park there are:

A mosaic commemorating the 1965 flood
A mosaic all about "love"
A modern design mosaic.

Alameda Square Shopping Center, located at 2200 W. Alameda Avenue, was developed in 1959 as Denver's first outdoor mall. When first constructed, the mall included a Ben Franklin dime store, a bowling alley, a furniture store and doctor offices. The very popular Organ Grinder pizza parlor, with its famous two story organ, was located at the center. By 1990, the center was past its prime and declared a blighted site. The center was redeveloped by Brighton Corporation in 2009-11. A public art installation, "Geese", was created by the Colorado sculptor Fred Lunger as part of the project.

== Education ==
Athmar Park is unique in Denver neighborhoods in that six separate schools serve the community at large:

- Goldrick Elementary (Mississippi & Zuni)
- Valverde Elementary (Alameda & Tejon)
- KIPP Sunshine Peak Academy (375 S. Tejon) - grades 5-8
- St. Rose of Lima Parochial Catholic Academy (1345 W. Dakota)
- Math and Science Leadership Academy (451 S. Tejon)
- KIPP Denver Collegiate High School (451 S. Tejon)

== See also ==
- Denver–Aurora–Lakewood, CO Metropolitan Statistical Area
- Front Range Urban Corridor
- List of neighborhoods in Denver
- List of populated places in Colorado
