= Valverde, Denver =

Neighborhood in Denver, Colorado

Coordinates: 39.7166°N 105.0150°W

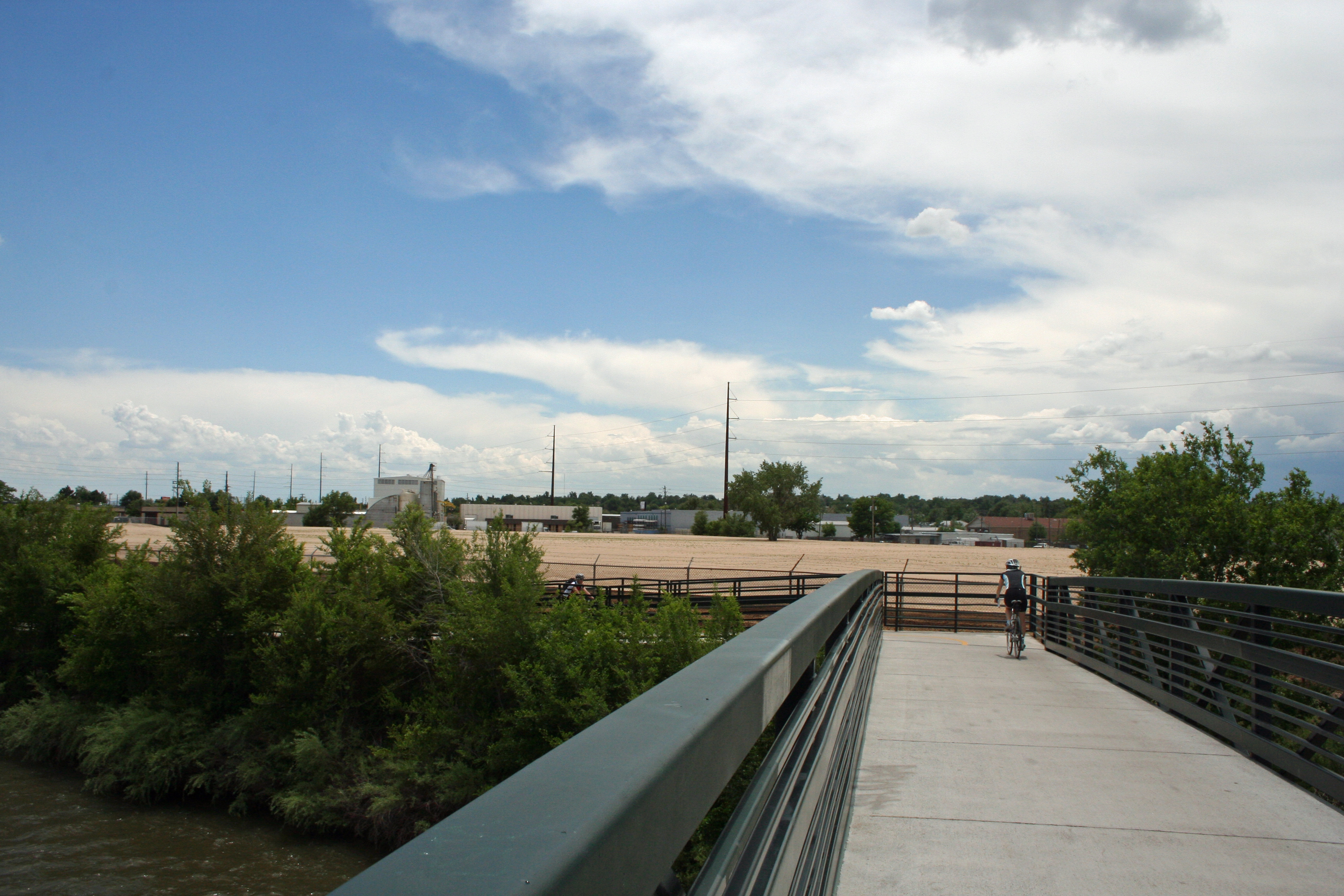
A view from the bike path bridge over the South Platte River looking west over the Valverde Neighborhood.

Valverde is a neighborhood of Denver, Colorado. It is in the area known as West Denver or the "West Side". According to the Piton Foundation, in 2007, the population of the neighborhood was 4,093, and there were 1,276 housing units. Valverde home values are expected to grow substantially, due to the recent population growth in the Denver metro area. The commute to downtown Denver from the Valverde neighborhood is less than 5 minutes since the completion of 6th avenue, which no longer merges with I-25.

== Boundaries ==
According to the Denver Statistical Neighborhood Boundaries map, the neighborhood is bordered on the west by Federal Boulevard, on the north by 6th Avenue, and on the south by West Alameda Avenue. The Eastern border is the South Platte River.

== Landmarks ==
There are several city parks in the neighborhood, and the South Platte River serves as the neighborhood's eastern boundary. Near the river, the neighborhood is mostly industrial, but further to the west it is dominated by single-family homes. Interstate 25 runs alongside the South Platte River to the east, but because the river itself is Valverde's eastern border, the freeway is technically in the Baker Neighborhood.

== History ==
Valverde is one of Denver's oldest neighborhoods. It consists mostly of industrial buildings as well as some single-family homes built in the 1930s and 1940s. Most are bungalow-style or low-profile 2-story homes. It borders the neighborhoods of Baker, Athmar Park, Barnum, and Westwood.

Valverde, from the Spanish for "green valley," was an incorporated town in 1899. It was disincorporated in 1902 and the area was annexed to Denver.

Today, the vast majority of residents are working-class Mexican Americans.

== See also ==
- Bibliography of Colorado
- Geography of Colorado
- History of Colorado
- Index of Colorado-related articles
- List of Colorado-related lists
  - List of neighborhoods in Denver
  - List of populated places in Colorado
- Outline of Colorado
