= Barnum, Denver =

Neighborhood of Denver, Colorado, United States

Barnum
- Neighborhood
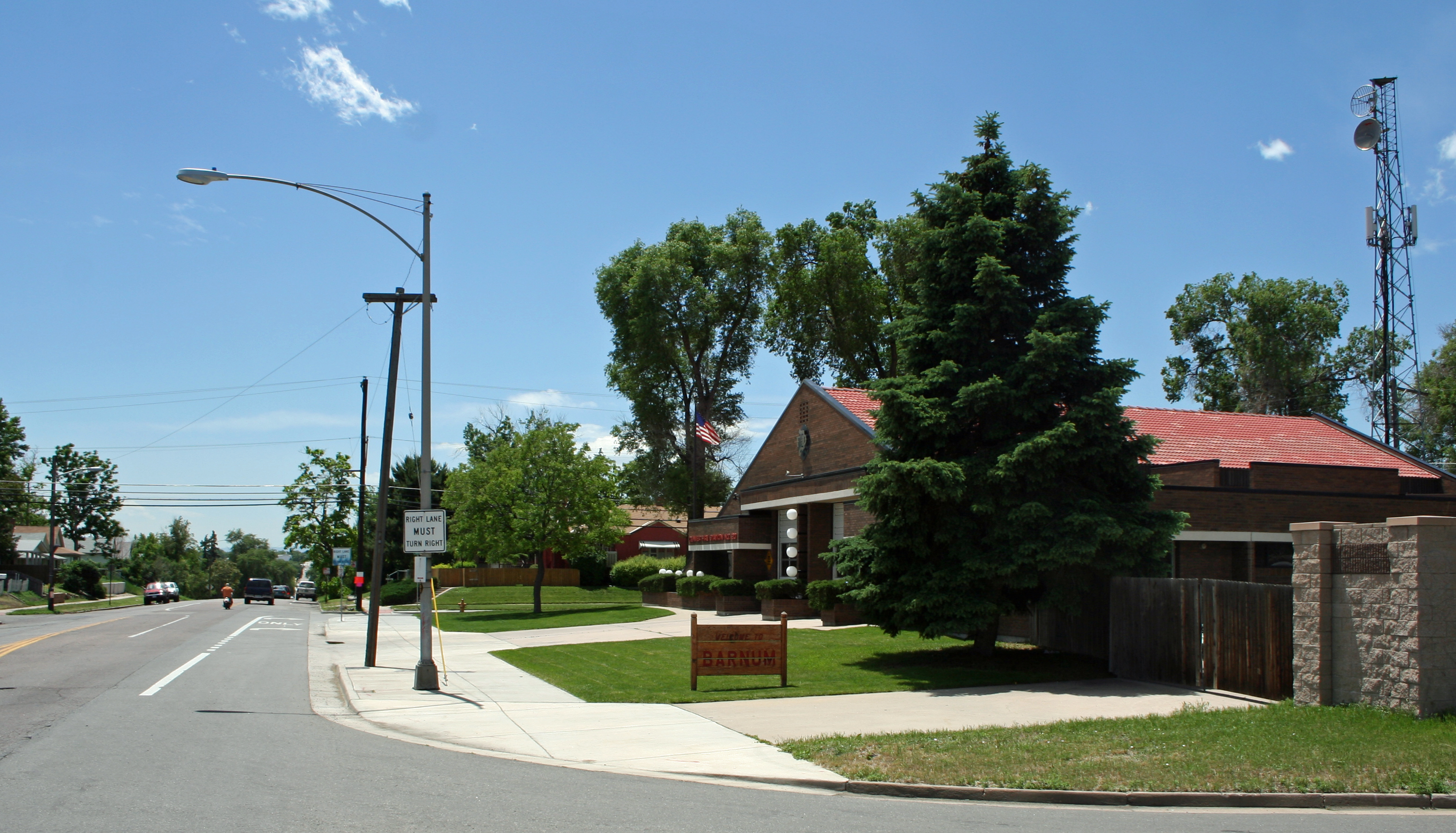
- The “Welcome to Barnum” sign at Denver Fire Station No. 20.
- Interactive map of Barnum
- Coordinates: 39.7182°N 105.0325°W
- Country: United States
- State: Colorado
- City and County: Denver

Barnum is a neighborhood of Denver, Colorado. The neighborhood is located in the area known as West Denver. According to the Piton Foundation, in 2007, the population of the neighborhood was 6,456, and there were 1,924 housing units.

== History ==
In 1865, Daniel Witter bought 160 acres southwest of Denver, the first in a series of land deals in the development and promotion of Villa Park. Envisioned as a vast development with unique features such as curving streets, Witter's dream of a home for Denver's wealthy was never realized. The Denver Villa Park Association raised money for development, but lawsuits followed and the association was soon bankrupt. Lands were placed with a trustee, and on March 11, 1878, offered for sale. Less than two weeks later, on March 21, 1878, the American circus mogul P.T. Barnum of the Barnum and Bailey Circus bought 760 acres (308 ha) for just $11,000, and a few years later, the Barnum subdivision was platted.

Barnum's involvement with his namesake's development has become part of Denver folklore, especially in the durable legend of the showman's plan to establish a winter home for his circus in the city. In fact, Barnum never wintered his animals anywhere other than Connecticut or Florida, and the entertainment entrepreneur made just four documented trips to Colorado. Barnum sold as much of Barnum as possible before disposing of the remainder to his daughter, Helen Buchtel, for the price of one dollar. Ironically, much of Barnum's initial development was a result of efforts by Helen, and her second husband, William Buchtel, who also served as mayor of an independent, incorporated Town of Barnum established in 1887. The Barnum, Colorado, post office operated from February 5, 1892, until June 30, 1901. The Town of Barnum was annexed by the City of Denver on September 3, 1893, and became a part of the City and County of Denver on November 15, 1902.

== Demographics ==
As of the year 2000, the racial makeup of Barnum is 20.73% White non-Hispanic, 0.61% African American, 0.83% Native American, 0.64% Asian, and 75.78% Hispanic or Latino.

== Boundaries ==
The neighborhood's northern boundary is the Sixth Avenue Freeway, its eastern boundary is Federal Boulevard, its southern Boundary is Alameda Avenue, and its western boundary is Perry Street.

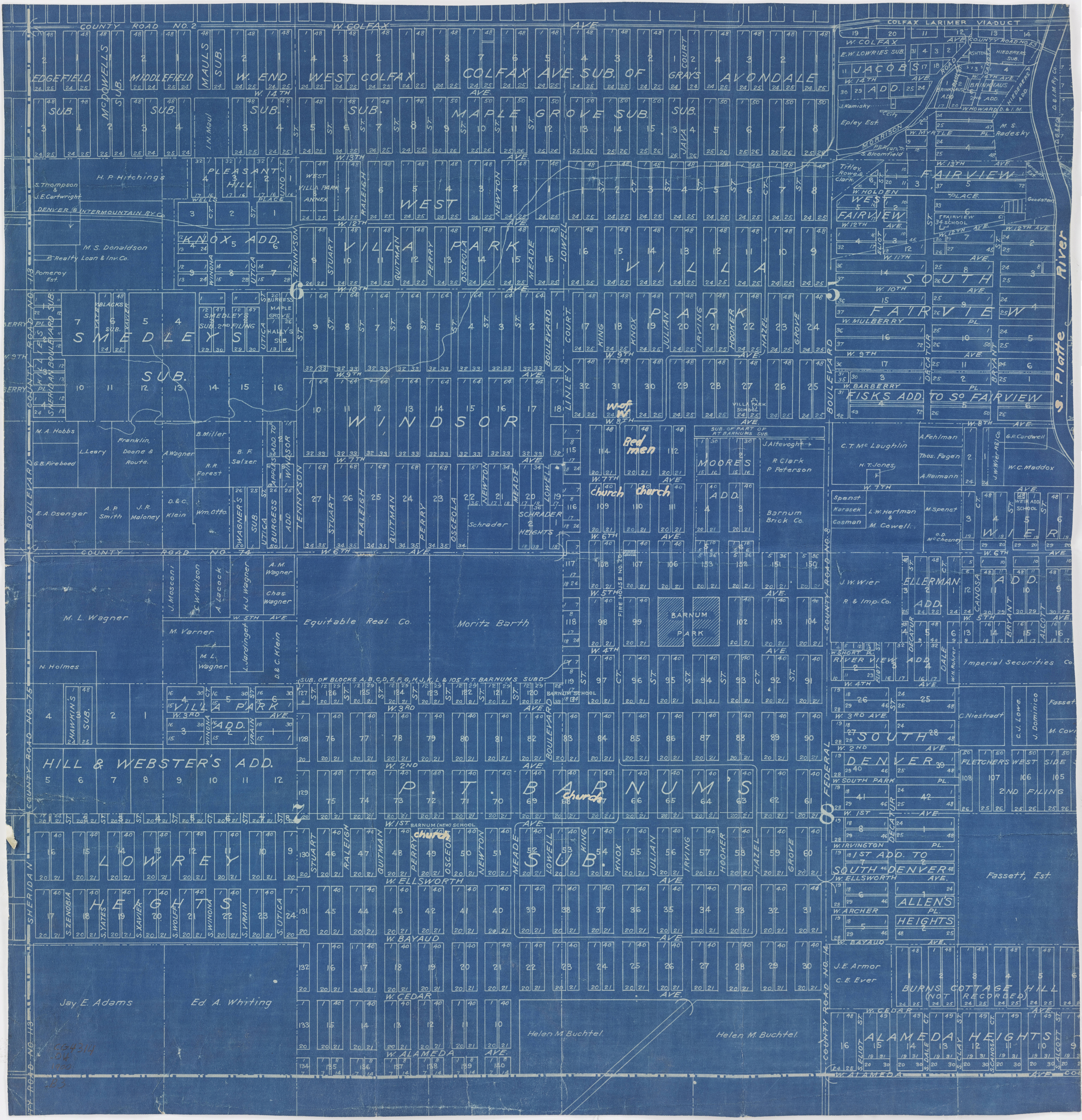
Blueprint map showing boundaries of plots, land owners for larger areas, street names, and neighborhood additions.

== See also ==
- Denver–Aurora–Lakewood, CO Metropolitan Statistical Area
- Front Range Urban Corridor
- List of neighborhoods in Denver
- List of populated places in Colorado
- List of post offices in Colorado
- Villa Park, Denver
