= Ruby Hill, Denver =

Neighborhood of Denver, Colorado, US

Ruby Hill
- Denver neighborhood
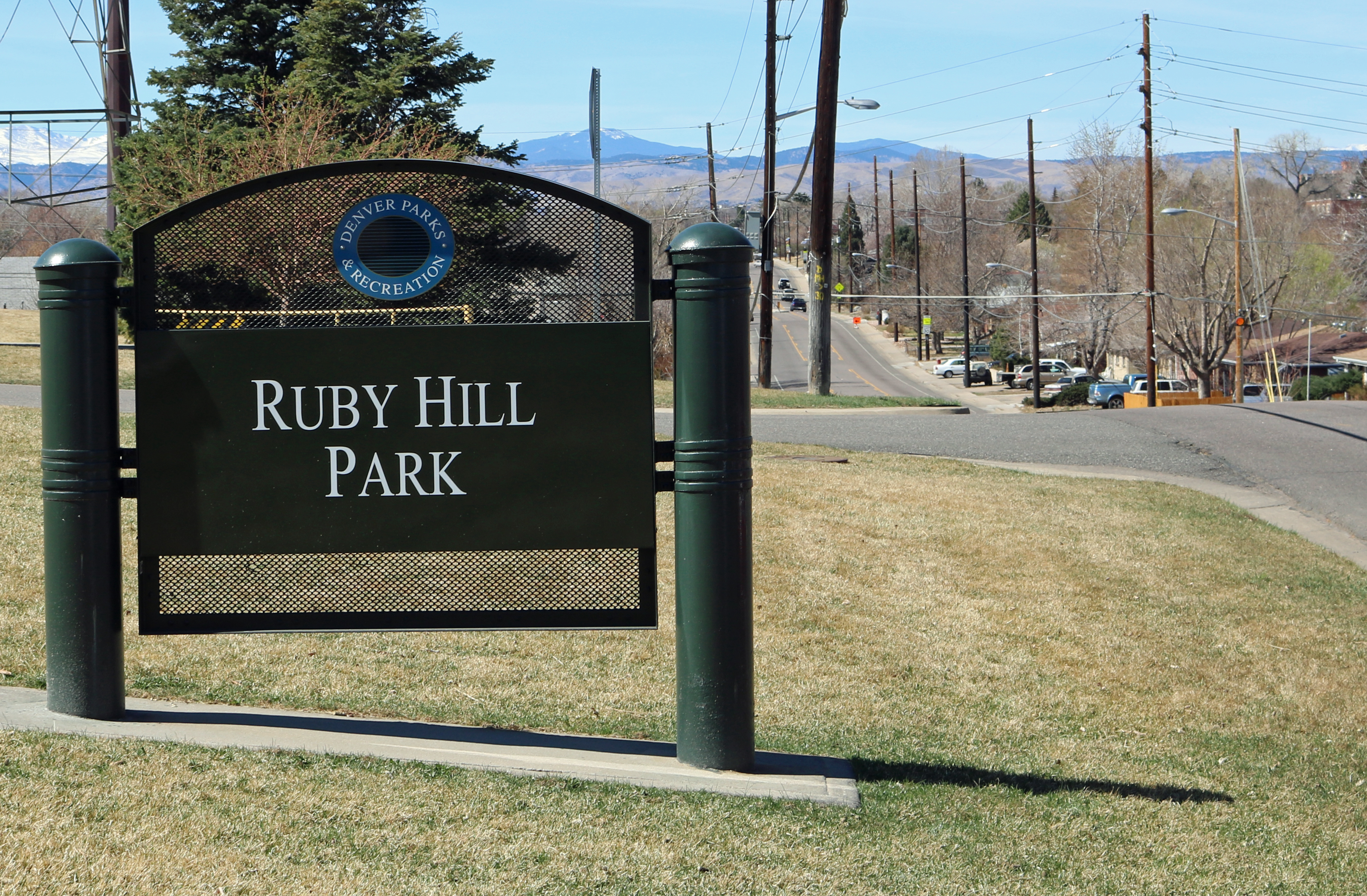
- Ruby Hill Park
- Interactive map of Ruby Hill
- Coordinates: 39.6861°N 105.0114°W
- Country: United States
- State: Colorado
- City and County: Denver
- Elevation: 5,344 ft (1,629 m)

Ruby Hill is a neighborhood in southwest Denver, Colorado. The neighborhood takes its name from Ruby Hill, a 5,390 ft (1,640 m) elevation hill in the neighborhood that overlooks much of South Denver. The hill itself was named for red stones found in the area by early miners, stones that turned out to be garnets.

== Boundaries ==
Ruby Hill is rectangular-shaped neighborhood located in the southwest part of Denver. Its boundaries are:

- North: West Mississippi Avenue
- East: The South Platte River
- South: West Jewell Avenue
- West: South Federal Boulevard

== Notable spots in Ruby Hill ==
- Ruby Hill Park occupies much of the eastern part of the neighborhood.
- The Ruby Hill Terrain Park, a part of Ruby Hill Park used for winter sports such as sledding, skiing and snowboarding.
- Ruby Hill Bike Park, a 7.5 acre mountain bike park that includes a slopestyle course, dirt jumps, pump tracks, and a skills course.
- Levitt Pavilion Denver, an outdoor concert venue with seating for 7,500, opened in mid-2017.
- Sanderson Gulch Park, an open space park and riparian area centered on a creek that empties into the South Platte River. A public trail follows alongside the creek.

== Population ==
In 2015, the population of Ruby Hill was 10,811. Except for the park and the gulch, most of the neighborhood consists of single-family homes and the businesses along South Federal Boulevard.

== See also ==
- Bibliography of Colorado
- Geography of Colorado
- History of Colorado
- Index of Colorado-related articles
- List of Colorado-related lists
  - List of neighborhoods in Denver
  - List of populated places in Colorado
- Outline of Colorado
