= Ruby Hill Terrain Park =

Artificial snow park in Denver, Colorado

Coordinates: 39°41′04″N 105°00′19″W

Ruby Hill Rail Yard is a ski and snowboard terrain park located in Denver, Colorado at the intersection of Platte River Drive and Jewell Avenue, in Ruby Hill Park near downtown Denver. Ruby Hill Rail Yard is made possible by Winter Park Resort, Denver Parks and Recreation, Christy Sports, TechnoAlpin, Denver Water, Choose Outdoors, The North Face, Wahoo's Fish Tacos, Snowboard Outreach Society (SOS), and over 30 volunteers.

== Description ==
Ruby Hill Rail Yard opened in January 2007 and was the USA's first free terrain park in a downtown area. The park was created by Winter Park Resort in an effort to attract urban youth to winter sports. It began as an experimental program and has since seen huge success. It attracted 3,000 youth and adults in its first year and became a model for other ski resort collaborations. The following season, the park attracted over 6,000 visitors. The city of Denver now qualifies the Ruby Hill Rail Yard as an annual park.

== Park History ==
The Ruby Hill Rail Yard is located in Ruby Hill Park, which covers 88 acres and was acquired in 1954. The park is named for the red stones that can be found in the nearby Platte River. Ruby Hill Park holds a high bluff that provides a wide view over Denver’s skyline, and which was used previously as a lookout by Native Americans.

== Logistics ==
In order for the Ruby Hill Rail Yard to exist, artificial snow must be made. Workers produce enough snow to cover about an acre of land. The snow is blown in January in hopes that it will last through the remainder of the winter months, weather permitting. Man-made snow is the most beneficial snow to use for this park because it melts at a slower rate than natural snow. The reason for this is that natural snow has a relatively low level of water content while man-made snow has a much higher level of water. This higher level of water content makes the snow more dense, which in turn makes it less susceptible to the sun. Ruby Hill is set up with Northeastern exposure, which reduces the amount of mid-day sun on the snow and allows the snow to last for weeks.

It takes about one million gallons of water to cover Ruby Hill with 2–3 feet of snow. Once this snow begins to melt, the water simply returns to the surrounding vegetation. The City of Denver has agreed with Denver Water to reduce its summer consumption of water by an amount equal to what it takes to blow snow on Ruby Hill. Hence, no water is being wasted, only transferred.

== Features and Hours ==
Ruby Hill Park is open from 5 a.m. to 11 p.m. The rail yard remains open through the winter months until the artificial snow melts. This is made possible because Ruby Hill has lights that allow the hill to run at night until 9 p.m. Ruby Hill has no lifts or T-bars, so you must hike in order to use the terrain park. There are seven rails that are featured in beginner, intermediate and advanced forms. There are also occasional events and contests that are held to promote Ruby Hill, such as youth programs run by Denver Parks and Recreation. In addition to the terrain park, other areas are designated for winter activities such as sledding.

== Current Activity ==
In a warm December in 2010, Ruby Hill was closed but it opened for the 2011 season through the months of January and February, as weather permits. The terrain park is free, open to the public, and is popular among skiers, snowboarders and people on sleds and inner tubes.

In the summer, the park itself is home to an outdoor swimming pool, baseball fields and a handicap accessible playground, and is a popular site for summer picnicking and kite-flying.

== See also ==
- Echo Mountain Park
- Winter Park Resort
- Keystone Resort
- Monarch Ski Area
- Ruby Hill, Denver
